= 2022 Limerick Premier Intermediate Hurling Championship =

- Dates: 29 July – 29 October 2022
- Teams: 8
- Sponsor: Lyons of Limerick
- Champions: Monaleen (1st title); Lorcan Lyons (captain); Dermot Gleeson (manager)
- Runners-up: Bruff; Seán Finn (captain); Ray Hourigan (manager)
- Relegated: Knockainey

Tournament statistics
- Matches played: 30
- Goals scored: 52 (1.73 per match)
- Points scored: 943 (31.43 per match)

The 2022 Limerick Premier Intermediate Hurling Championship was the ninth staging of the Limerick Premier Intermediate Hurling Championship since its establishment by the Limerick County Board in 2014. The championship ran from 29 July to 29 October 2022.

The final was played on 29 October 2022 at FitzGerald Park in Kilmallock, between Monaleen and Bruff, in what was their first ever meeting in the final. Monaleen won the match by 2–16 to 0–16 to claim their first ever championship title in the grade.

== Team changes ==
=== To Championship ===
Relegated from the Limerick Senior Hurling Championship

- Monaleen

Promoted from the Limerick Intermediate Hurling Championship

- Effin

=== From Championship ===
Promoted to the Limerick Senior Hurling Championship

- Mungret/St. Paul's

Relegated to the Limerick Intermediate Hurling Championship

- Murroe-Boher

== Group stage ==
=== Group table ===
Team	Matches				Score			Pts
Team	Pld	W	D	L	For	Against	Diff	Pts
Monaleen	7	4	1	1	159	129	30	9
Bruff	7	4	1	2	151	129	22	9
Newcastle	7	4	1	2	139	118	21	9
Effin	7	4	0	3	130	127	3	8
Dromin/Athlacca	7	3	1	3	127	133	−6	7
Glenroe	7	3	1	3	144	135	9	7
Cappamore	7	2	0	5	135	153	−18	4
Knockainey	7	0	1	6	104	161	−57	1

== Knockout stage ==
=== Semi-finals ===
15 October 2022 Semi-final	Bruff	3–17 – 1–22	Newcastle West	Ballyagran Grounds

16 October 2022 Semi-final	Monaleen	1–18 – 0–15	Effin	Fedamore Grounds

=== Final ===
29 October 2022 Final	Bruff	0–16 – 2–16	Monaleen	FitzGerald Park, Kilmallock
