= 2026 Limerick Premier Intermediate Hurling Championship =

- Dates: 23 July – 25 October 2026
- Teams: 8
- Sponsor: Lyons of Limerick
- Champions: Dromin/Athlacca (2nd title); David Breen (captain); Shane Scully (captain); James Kennedy (manager)
- Runners-up: Bruff; Paul O'Riordan (captain); Paddy O'Leary (manager)
- Relegated: Glenroe

Tournament statistics
- Matches played: 31
- Goals scored: 71 (2.29 per match)
- Points scored: 1072 (34.58 per match)
- Top scorer: Owen Meaney (0–85)

The 2026 Limerick Premier Intermediate Hurling Championship was the 13th staging of the Limerick Premier Intermediate Hurling Championship since its establishment by the Limerick County Board in 2014. The draw for the group stage placings took place on 21 January 2026. The championship ran from 23 July to 25 October 2026.

The final was played on 25 October 2026 at the TUS Gaelic Grounds in Limerick, between Dromin/Athlacca and Bruff, in what was their first ever meeting in the final. Dromin/Athlacca won the match by 2–18 to 3–11 to claim their second championship title overall and a first title in three years.

Bruff's Owen Meaney was the championship's top scorer with 0–85.

== Team changes ==
=== To Championship ===
Relegated from the Limerick Senior Hurling Championship

- Dromin/Athlacca

Promoted from the Limerick Intermediate Hurling Championship

- Murroe–Boher

=== From Championship ===
Promoted to the Limerick Senior Hurling Championship

- Garryspillane

Relegated to the Limerick Intermediate Hurling Championship

- South Liberties

== Group stage ==
=== Group stage table ===
Knockout stage Relegated

Team	Matches				Score			Pts
Team	Pld	W	D	L	For	Against	Diff	Pts
Murroe–Boher	7	7	0	0	167	120	47	14
Bruff	7	3	3	1	155	132	23	9
Blackrock	7	3	2	2	156	142	14	8
Dromin/Athlacca	7	4	0	3	152	129	23	8
Croagh–Kilfinny	7	1	3	3	137	144	-7	5
Effin	7	1	3	4	138	153	-15	5
Granagh–Ballingarry	7	2	0	5	138	173	-35	4
Glenroe	7	1	1	5	119	169	-50	3

=== Group stage results ===
23 July 2026 Round 1	Murroe–Boher	1-19 - 1-14	Granagh–Ballingarry	Brother Rice Field
	S Tobin 1-7 (1-5f, 1 ‘65), O Holmes 0-3 (1f), J O’Keeffe, D Collopy and Michael Ryan 0-2 each, Mikey Ryan, J Nicholas and D Sheehan 0-1 each;	Report	S O’Connor 1-4, L Flynn (4f) and M Russell 0-4 each, D Condron and D Casey 0-1 each.

25 July 2026 Round 1	Bruff	0-18 - 0-18	Blackrock	Knocklong Sportsfield
	O Meaney 0-9 (8f, 1 ‘65f); J Keating 0-2; D O'Leary, K Bonnar, B Callinan, D Butler, C O'Loughlin, E Daly, P Browne (s/l) 0-1 each.	Report	C O'Keeffe (4f) and J Quilty 0-4 each; S O'Neill and S Flanagan 0-3 each; S Philpott 0-2; C Ensor and J Moloney 0-1 each.

26 July 2026 Round 1	Glenroe	0-16 - 1-25	Dromin/Athlacca	Knocklong Sportsfield
	D Frewen 0-7 (7f), D Dennehy and C Dennehy 0-2, D Murphy, C Kelly and D McCarthy (1f), O Browne, A Frewen 0-1 each.	Report	T Boddy 0-8 (6f, 1 '65), D Reidy 0-7 (1f), D Scully 0-5, S Fitzgibbon 1-0, J Fitzgibbon 0-3, C Scully and S O'Leary 0-1 each;

26 July 2026 Round 1	Croagh–Kilfinny	0-17 - 0-17	Effin	Paddy Carroll Park
	C O’Carroll 0-5 (2f, 1 ‘65, 1 s/l), J Lenihan 0-4, C Lenihan and S Lenihan 0-2 each, S Hickey, J Wall, J Lanigan (1f) and D Lynch (1f) 0-1 each;	Report	P O’Donovan 0-4 (3f), F O’Connor, E Dillon and R O’Connor 0-3 each, C O’Riordan 0-2, F Herr and P O’Kelly 0-1 each.

1 August 2026 Round 2	Dromin/Athlacca	0-22 - 0-18	Croagh–Kilfinny	Ballingarry Grounds
	T Boddy 0-9 (8f), D Scully, J Fitzgibbon, D Reidy (1 ‘65) 0-3 each, D Breen, D Griffin, C Reidy, S Fitzgibbon 0-1 each;	Report	C O'Carroll 0-10 (8f), S Hickey, J Lanigan 0-2 each, J Wall, B Lenihan, D Lynch (free), D O'Carroll 0-1 each.

1 August 2026 Round 2	Effin	1-20 - 1-20	Bruff	FitzGerald Park
	P O'Donovan 0-13 (10f), E Dillon 0-4, R O'Connor 1-1, F O'Connor 0-2.	Report	O Meaney 0-11 (11f), D O'Leary 0-3, D Dennehy 1-0, J Keating 0-2, B Callinan, P O'Riordan, D Butler, C Shanahan 0-1 each;

1 August 2026 Round 2	Blackrock	3-17 - 1-28	Murroe–Boher	Bruff Sportsfield
	S Lyons 2-2, C O’Keeffe 0-8 (6f); S Flanagan 1-2; P Leahy 0-2 (1f); D Moloney (1f), M Farrell, S O’Neill 0-1 each.	Report	S Tobin 0-8 (6f); J Casey 1-2; M Ryan, J O’Keeffe 0-4 each; M Ryan, A Kennedy 0-3 each, M Nicholas 0-2; S Fitzgerald, D Sheehan 0-1 each;

7 August 2026 Round 3	Croagh–Kilfinny	1-19 - 2-17	Granagh–Ballingarry	Seán Finn Park
	C O’Carroll 0-12 (8f); J Lenihan 0-4; D Lenihan 1-0; S Lenihan, J Wall and D O’Carroll 0-1 each.	Report	L Flynn 0-8 (6f); D O’Donoghue 2-0; S O’Connor 0-3 (3f); P Murphy and J Mulcaire Quille 0-2 each; E Horgan and E Herlihy 0-1 each;

7 August 2026 Round 3	Glenroe	1-14 - 1-18	Blackrock	Knocklong Sports Field
	D Frewen 1-9 (4f, 1 ‘65), L Dennehy, K McCarthy, C Dennehy, B O'Connell and A Frewen 0-1 each.	Report	C O'Keeffe 0-8 (5f, 1 '65), S Lyons 1-0, C Ensor, S Flanagan 0-2 each, J Quilty, C Gilligan, F Heffernan, S O'Neill, D Moloney (1f) and P Leahy 0-1 each;

8 August 2026 Round 3	Effin	1-17 - 3-18	Dromin/Athlacca	FitzGerald Park
	P O’Donovan 0-13 (9f); E Dillon 1-1; F O’Connor, F Herr, P O’Kelly 0-1 each.	Report	J Fitzgibbon 2-2; D Reidy 0-8 (5f, 1 ’65); J O’Connor 1-1; D Breen, S Fitzgibbon 0-2 each; C Scully, D Griffin, S O’Leary (1f) 0-1 each.

8 August 2026 Round 3	Bruff	0-17 - 1-15	Murroe–Boher	Fedamore Grounds
	O Meaney 0-10 (10f), C Cronin, P Browne 0-2 each, D Butler, P O'Leary (sideline), J Keating 0-1 each.	Report	S Tobin 0-5 (4f), J Casey 1-0, O Holmes 0-3 (1f), M Nicholas 0-2, K Quaid, A Kennedy (1f), D Sheehan, J Nicholas, M Ryan 0-1 each;

17 August 2026 Round 2	Granagh–Ballingarry	3-18 - 4-16	Glenroe	Knocklong Sportsfield
	L Flynn 1-4 (1f, 2 ‘65s); S O’Connor 0-6 (1f, 1 s/l, 1 ’65); D Condron 1-1; P Murphy 1-1 each; E Horgan 0-2 (1f); M Russell 0-2; D O’Donoghue, C O’Keeffe 0-1 each.	Report	D Frewen 2-5 (1-0 s/l; 3f); C Dennehy 1-4; L Dennehy 1-1; A Frewen 0-3; D McCarthy 0-2 (2f); E Fitzgerald 0-1;

27 August 2026 Round 4	Murroe–Boher	2-20 - 0-10	Glenroe	St John's Park
	S Tobin 1-12, O Holmes 1-1, D Collopy 0-2, J O'Keeffe 0-2, D Sheehan 0-1, J Nicholas 0-1, M Ryan 0-1.		D Frewen 0-6, D McCarthy 0-2, L Dennehy 0-1, S O'Donoghue 0-1.

28 August 2026 Round 4	Dromin/Athlacca	2-14 - 1-18	Bruff	FitzGerald Park
	J Fitzgibbon 1-5 (1f); D Reidy 0-6 (5f); D Breen 1-0; D Scully 0-2; S O’Leary 0-1.	Report	O Meaney 0-11 (11f); J Keating 1-2; P Browne and D O’Leary 0-2 each; B Callinan 0-1;

29 August 2026 Round 4	Blackrock	1-19 - 2-16	Croagh–Kilfinny	Páirc Caoimhín Ó Luing
	C O’Keeffe 0-8 (7f); S Lyons 1-2; P Leahy 0-3; S Flanagan and J Quilty 0-2 each; S O’Neill and N Ryan 0-1 each;	Report	C O’Carroll 1-9 (8f); J Lenihan 1-1; S Hickey and D O’Carroll 0-2 each; G Lenihan and A Shanagher 0-1 each.

3 September 2026 Round 5	Dromin/Athlacca	1-16 - 0-10	Granagh–Ballingarry	Paddy Carroll Park
	D Reidy (5f) and J Fitzgibbon (4f) 0-5 each, D Scully 1-0, C Scully 0-3 (1f), D Breen, M Quaid and J O’Keeffe 0-1 each;	Report	L Flynn 0-7 (6f), E Horgan 0-2 (2f) and S O’Connor 0-1.

4 September 2026 Round 5	Bruff	3-19 - 0-13	Glenroe	Michael Fox Park
	D O'Leary and S Finn 1-2 each; J Keating, B Callinan and O Meaney (4f) 0-4 each; D Butler 1-0; C Cronin 0-2; P Browne 0-1;	Report	A Frewen 0-7 (4f); D McCarthy 0-2 (2f); S O'Donnell, C Kelly, L Dennehy and B Frewen 0-1 each.

4 September 2026 Round 5	Effin	2-14 - 0-16	Blackrock	Knocklong Sports Field
	P O'Donovan 1-6; (4f, 1 ‘65;) T Quaid 1-0; F O’Connor and J Quaid, 0-2 each; N Quaid, R O’Connor, C O’Riordan and E Dillon 0-1 each;	Report	P Leahy 0-6, (4f); S O’Neill 0-4; C O’Keeffe (2f), and J Quilty 0-2 each; K Aherne and S Lyons 0-1 each.

5 September 2026 Round 5	Croagh–Kilfinny	1-16 - 0-25	Murroe–Boher	Mungret Grounds
	C O'Carroll 0-12 (11 frees), D O'Carroll 1-0, B Flynn, G Lenihan, C Lenihan and S Madigan 0-1 each.	Report	S Tobin 0-8 (3f, 1 '65'), D Collopy 0-7, M Ryan and J Nicholas 0-3 each, A Kennedy, J O'Keeffe, D Sheehan and J Casey 0-1 each;

10 September 2026 Round 4	Granagh–Ballingarry	1-23 - 3-15	Effin	Mick Neville Park
	L Flynn 0-11 (5f, 1 ‘65), D O’Donoghue 1-1, M Russell 0-4, S O’Connor 0-3 (1f), P Murphy, M O’Shea, J Mulcaire-Quille and E Horgan 0-1 each;	Report	P O’Donovan 2-7 (4f), F O’Connor 1-0, T Quaid 0-2 (1f), C O’Riordan, J Quaid, N Quaid, B Clifford, P O’Kelly and E Dillon 0-1 each.

16 September 2026 Round 6	Murroe–Boher	0-22 - 1-09	Effin	Doon Grounds
	S Tobin 0-12 (10f), O Holmes 0-3, J Nicholas, M Nicholas, M Ryan 0-2 each, D Collopy 0-1;	Report	P O'Donovan 0-6 (3f), T Quaid 1-0, R O'Connor 0-2, N Quaid 0-1.

16 September 2026 Round 6	Blackrock	1-18 - 2-11	Dromin/Athlacca	Knocklong Sportsfield
	C O'Keeffe 1-7 (6f, 1 ‘65); S O'Neill 0-4; J Quilty 0-3; N Ryan, M Farrell, P Leahy and S Lyons 0-1 each;	Report	D Reidy 0-7 (5f); J Fitzgibbon 1-2 (1f); D Breen 1-1; C Scully 0-1 (1f).

17 September 2026 Round 6	Granagh–Ballingarry	1-15 - 1-23	Bruff	Michael Fox Park
			O Meaney 0-13.

19 September 2026 Round 6	Glenroe	0-13 - 1-14	Croagh–Kilfinny	FitzGerald Park
	C Dennehy 0-6 (3f), K McCarthy 0-2, D McCarthy (1f), D Dennehy, C Kelly, S O'Donoghue, O Browne 0-1 each.	Report	C O'Carroll 1-5 (3f, 1 '65'), S O'Carroll 0-4, S Hickey 0-2, J Wall, D Lynch, S Lenihan 0-1 each;

26 September 2026 Round 7	Effin	1-19 - 1-19	Glenroe	Michael Fox Park
	P O’Donovan 0-7 (5f); T Quaid 1-1; E Dillon 0-3; J Quaid, F O’Connor, C O’Riordan and R O’Connor 0-2 each;	Report	D Frewen 0-10 (6f); C Kelly 1-1; C Dennehy and L Dennehy 0-3 each; D Dennehy and D Murphy 0-1 each.

26 September 2026 Round 7	Bruff	2-16 - 1-19	Croagh–Kilfinny	Paddy Carroll Memorial Park
	O Meaney 0-7 (6f), S Finn, D Dennehy 1-0 each, J Keating, P Browne 0-3 each, B Callinan, C Cronin, P Finn 0-1 each.	Report	C O'Carroll 1-8 (5f, 2 '65's), J Lenihan, D Lynch (3f) 0-3 each, S Hickey, S O'Carroll 0-2 each, J O'Connor 0-1;

26 September 2026 Round 7	Granagh–Ballingarry	0-17 - 5-17	Blackrock	Bruff Grounds
	L Flynn 0-9 (5f); E Horgan 0-3 (2 ‘65s); J Cagney, M Russell 0-2 each; J Mulcaire-Quille 0-1.	Report	J Quilty 2-2; F Heffernan 2-2; C O’Keeffe 0-4 (2f); S O’Neill 1-2; S Flanagan 0-3; P Leahy, S Philpott 0-2 each;

26 September 2026 Round 7	Dromin/Athlacca	0-19 - 2-17	Murroe–Boher	Fedamore Grounds
	D Reidy 0-7 (5f), C Scully 0-4, D Scully, J Fitzgibbon and D Breen 0-2 each, T Boddy and M Reidy 0-1 each.	Report	S Tobin 0-7 (4f), D Collopy and M Ryan 1-2 each, O Holmes and M Nicholas 0-2 each, A Kennedy and J Nicholas 0-1 each;

== Knokcout stage ==
=== Semi-finals ===
10 October 2026 Semi-final	Dromin/Athlacca	0-19 - 0-18	Murroe–Boher	FitzGerald Park
	D Reidy 0-11 (9f); D Breen 0-5; J Fitzgibbon 0-2 and T Boddy 0-1.	Report	S Tobin 0-10 (5f); A Kennedy, M Ryan and M Nicholas 0-2 each; D Sheehan and D Collopy 0-1 each;

10 October 2026 Semi-final	Blackrock	1-17 - 1-18	Bruff	FitzGerald Park
	C O’Keeffe 0-8 (5f); S O’Neill 0-6; F Heffernan 1-1; M Farrell and P Leahy 0-1 each.	Report	O Meaney 0-10 (9f); D Butler 1-2; D O’Leary, P O’Riordan, K Bonnar, B Callinan, P Browne and C Cronin 0-1 each;

=== Final ===
25 October 2026 Final	Dromin/Athlacca	2-18 - 3-11	Bruff	TUS Gaelic Grounds
	D Reidy 0-10 (7f, 1 ‘65); D Breen 1-3; J Fitzgibbon 1-2; D Scully 0-2; D Griffin 0-1.	Report	O Meaney 0-7 (7f); P Browne 2-1; S Finn 1-0; J Keating, C Shanahan and K Bonnar 0-1 each.	Referee: K Guina (Feohanagh-Castlemahon)

== Championship statistics ==
=== Top scorers ===
Rank	Player	Club	Tally	Total	Matches	Average
1	Owen Meaney	Bruff	0-82	82	9	9.11
2	Seánie Tobin	Murroe–Boher	2-69	75	8	9.37
3	Cian O'Carroll	Croagh–Kilfinny	3-61	70	7	10.00
4	Patrick O'Donovan	Effin	3-56	65	7	9.28
5	David Reidy	Dromin/Athlacca	0-64	64	9	7.11
6	Colm O'Keeffe	Blackrock	1-49	52	8	6.50
7	Darren Frewen	Glenroe	3-37	46	5	9.20
7	Luke Flynn	Granagh–Ballingarry	1-43	46	7	6.57
9	Jack Fitzgibbon	Dromin/Athlacca	5-26	41	9	4.55
10	David Breen	Dromin/Athlacca	3-15	24	9	2.66
