= 2023 Limerick Premier Intermediate Hurling Championship =

- Dates: 27 July – October 2023
- Teams: 8
- Sponsor: Lyons of Limerick
- Champions: Dromin/Athlacca (1st title); Peter Ryan (captain); Ger Hickey (manager)
- Runners-up: Blackrock; Paudie Leahy (captain); Peter Finn (manager)

Tournament statistics
- Matches played: 31
- Goals scored: 63 (2.03 per match)
- Points scored: 1028 (33.16 per match)

The 2023 Limerick Premier Intermediate Hurling Championship was the 10th staging of the Limerick Premier Intermediate Hurling Championship since its establishment by the Limerick County Board in 2014. The draws for the group stage took place on 3 February 2023. The championship ran from 27 July to 28 October 2023.

The final was played on 28 October 2023 at the TUS Gaelic Grounds in Limerick, between Dromin/Athlacca and Blackrock, in what was their first ever meeting in the final. Dromin/Athlacca won the match by 2–20 to 3–16 to claim their first ever championship title in the grade.

== Team changes ==
=== To Championship ===
Relegated from the Limerick Senior Hurling Championship

- Blackrock

Promoted from the Limerick Intermediate Hurling Championship

- Na Piarsaigh

=== From Championship ===
Promoted to the Limerick Senior Hurling Championship

- Monaleen

Relegated to the Limerick Intermediate Hurling Championship

- Knockainey

== Group stage ==
=== Group stage table ===
Knockout stage Relegated

Team	Matches				Score			Pts
Team	Pld	W	D	L	For	Against	Diff	Pts
Effin	7	6	0	1	165	129	36	12
Dromin/Athlacca	7	5	0	2	141	121	20	10
Bruff	7	5	0	2	146	138	8	10
Blackrock	7	4	0	3	139	139	0	8
Newcastle West	7	4	0	3	128	122	6	8
Na Piarsaigh	7	2	0	5	123	149	−26	4
Glenroe	7	2	0	5	123	132	−9	2
Cappamore	7	0	0	7	134	169	−35	0

=== Group stage results ===
27 July 2023 Round 1	Glenroe	1–17 – 1–20	Na Piarsaigh	St John's Park
	M O'Connell 0–5, E Walsh 0–5, D McCarthy 1–0, C Kelly 0–3, O Browne 0–2, W Kearns 0–1, B O'Connell 0–1.		P Gleeson 0–12, D Sheppard 1–2, M Hogan 0–2, J Fitzgerald 0–1, J Finn 0–1, W Kearns 0–1, E Sweeney 0–1.

28 July 2023 Round 1	Bruff	2–16 – 1–15	Cappamore	Fr Hayes Memorial Park
	J Keating 1–7, D Browne 1–1, P Browne 0–2, C Browne 0–2, D O'Leary 0–2, B O'Brien 0–1, D Butler 0–1.		L O'Donnell 0–7, S Whelan 0–4, PJ Hogan 1–0, J Lonergan 0–3, T O'Donoghue 0–1.

30 July 2023 Round 1	Dromin-Athlacca	1–12 – 0–16	Blackrock	FitzGerald Park
	D Scully 1–3, D Reidy 0–4, J Lenihan 0–4, P McMahon 0–1.		C O'Keeffe 0–9, P Leahy 0–3, S O'Neill 0–2, M Farrell 0–1, R O'Shaughnessy 0–1.

30 July 2023 Round 1	Effin	0–19 – 0–09	Newcastle West	Ballyagran Grounds
	P O'Donovan 0–10, R O'Connor 0–2, F Herr 0–2, P O'Kelly 0–1, P Carroll 0–1, T Quaid 0–1, F O'Connor 0–1, E Dillon 0–1.		Eoin Hurley 0–3, Ethan Hurley 0–2, C Hayes 0–2, B Hurley 0–1, R O'Connor 0–1.

5 August 2023 Round 2	Newcastle West	0–14 – 0–15	Blackrock	Ballyagran Grounds

5 August 2023 Round 2	Glenroe	0–14 – 0–17	Bruff	Michael Fox Park

5 August 2023 Round 2	Effin	1–18 – 1–22	Dromin-Athlacca	FitzGerald Park

6 August 2023 Round 2	Na Piarsaigh	2–13 – 1–15	Cappamore	Fr Hayes Memorial Park

10 August 2023 Round 3	Dromin-Athlacca	0–16 – 0–24	Newcastle West	Páirc na nGael

11 August 2023 Round 3	Glenroe	0–23 – 0–15	Cappamore	St John's Park

12 August 2023 Round 3	Effin	2–19 – 1–17	Blackrock	FitzGerald Park

13 August 2023 Round 3	Na Piarsaigh	2–13 – 1–23	Bruff	Fedamore Grounds

2 September 2023 Round 4	Cappamore	1–18 – 0–23	Newcastle West	FitzGerald Park

2 September 2023 Round 4	Glenroe	0–17 – 1–21	Effin	Michael Fox Park

2 September 2023 Round 4	Bruff	0–16 – 1–19	Dromin-Athlacca	FitzGerald Park

3 September 2023 Round 4	Na Piarsaigh	0–14 – 0–17	Blackrock	Bruff Grounds

7 September 2023 Round 5	Cappamore	1–17 – 4–14	Dromin-Athlacca	St John's Park

8 September 2023 Round 5	Na Piarsaigh	1–18 – 2–21	Effin	Brother Rice Field

9 September 2023 Round 5	Glenroe	1–17 – 3–15	Newcastle West	Dromcollogher Grounds

9 September 2023 Round 5	Bruff	1–26 – 2–18	Blackrock	FitzGerald Park

23 September 2023 Round 6	Bruff	1–13 – 2–17	Effin	FitzGerald Park

23 September 2023 Round 6	Cappamore	1–18 – 5–15	Blackrock	Moneteen Grounds

24 September 2023 Round 6	Glenroe	1–05 – 1–09	Dromin-Athlacca	Michael Fox Park

24 September 2023 Round 6	Na Piarsaigh	0–11 – 0–16	Newcastle West	Páirc an Chrócaigh

1 October 2023 Round 7	Na Piarsaigh	2–10 – 0–25	Dromin-Athlacca	Frdamore Grounds

1 October 2023 Round 7	Glenroe	2–15 – 0–17	Blackrock	FitzGerald Park

1 October 2023 Round 7	Cappamore	2–15 – 2–20	Effin	Bruff Grounds

1 October 2023 Round 7	Bruff	1–17 – 1–15	Newcastle West	Ballyagran Grounds

== Knockout stage ==
=== Semi-finals ===
14 October 2023 Semi-final	Blackrock	1–17 – 0–15	Effin	Bruff Sportsfield

14 October 2023 Semi-final	Bruff	1–12 – 0–17	Dromin/Athlacca	FitzGerald Park

=== Final ===
28 October 2023 Final	Blackrock	3–16 – 2–20	Dromin/Athlacca	TUS Gaelic Grounds
	P Leahy 1–5 (1–3 frees); C O’Keefe 1–6 (0–6 frees); R O’Shaughnessy 1–3; S O’Neill 0–1; R McCarthy 0–1.	Report	D Reidy 0–7 (0–4 frees); D Breen 1–2; J Fitzgibbon 1–1; D Scully 0–4; P Ryan, M Fitzpatrick 0–2 each; P McMahon, M Reidy 0–1 each.	Referee: É Stapleton (Doon)
