= 2021 Limerick Premier Intermediate Hurling Championship =

- Dates: 3 September – 24 October 2021
- Teams: 8
- Sponsor: Lyons of Limerick
- Champions: Mungret/St. Paul's (1st title); Cian O'Brien (captain); Liam Cronin (manager)
- Runners-up: Cappamore; John Ryan (captain); Declan Deere (manager)
- Relegated: Murroe-Boher

Tournament statistics
- Matches played: 16
- Goals scored: 42 (2.63 per match)
- Points scored: 501 (31.31 per match)
- Top scorer(s): Liam Lynch (2–44)

The 2021 Limerick Premier Intermediate Hurling Championship was the eighth staging of the Limerick Premier Intermediate Hurling Championship since its establishment by the Limerick County Board in 2014. The championship began on 3 September 2021 and ended on 24 October 2021.

The final was played on 24 October 2021 at the TUS Gaelic Grounds in Limerick, between Mungret/St. Paul's and Cappamore, in what was their first ever meeting in a final. Mungret/St. Paul's won the match by 4–17 to 1–12 to claim their first championship title in the grade.

Liam Lynch was the championship's top scorer with 2–44.

== Team changes ==
=== To Championship ===
Relegated from the Limerick Senior Hurling Championship

- Murroe-Boher

Promoted from the Limerick Intermediate Hurling Championship

- Newcastle West

=== From Championship ===
Promoted to the Limerick Senior Hurling Championship

- Kildimo-Pallaskenry

Relegated to the Limerick Intermediate Hurling Championship

- Bruree

== Results ==
=== Group 1 ===
==== Group 1 table ====
Team	Matches				Score			Pts
Team	Pld	W	D	L	For	Against	Diff	Pts
Mungret/St. Paul's	3	3	0	0	80	55	25	6
Cappamore	3	2	0	1	67	61	6	4
Knockainey	3	0	1	2	65	77	−12	1
Murroe-Boher	3	0	1	2	63	82	−19	1

==== Group 1 results ====
3 September 2021 Round 1	Mungret/St. Paul's	6–17 – 1–16	Murroe-Boher	Bruff GAA Grounds
	L Lynch 2–9, N Mulcahy 2–0, C O'Brien 1–1, B O'Meara 0–3, C Lenihan 0–1, B Barry 0–1, K O'Dowd 0–1, E Mulcahy 0–1.		K Clohessy 0–6, Michael Ryan 0–4, Mikey Ryan 1–0, J Casey 0–3, F Hourigan 0–1, M Nicholas 0–1, C Byrnes 0–1.

4 September 2021 Round 1	Knockainey	2–16 – 3–18	Cappamore	Kilteely GAA Grounds
	P Kirby 1–8, K Cleary 1–1, P Reale 0–2, J Lonergan 0–1, D Madden 0–1, E Dorney 0–1, M O'Grady 0–1, P Barron 0–1.		L O'Donnell 1–3, J Lonergan 1–3, E Gleeson 1–0, C Berkery 0–3, PJ Hogan 0–2, B Creamer 0–2, T O'Donoghue 0–2, R Hanley 0–1, C O'Brien 0–1, J Ryan 0–1.

11 September 2021 Round 2	Murroe-Boher	3–17 – 2–20	Knockainey	Fr. Hayes Memorial Park
	K Clohessy 1–8, J Nicholas 1–2, Mikey Ryan 1–1, J Casey 0–2, D Sheehan 0–1, F Hourigan 0–1, M Hanley 0–1, E Hourigan 0–1.		P Kirby 0–7, P Barron 1–3, J Lonergan 1–3, M O'Grady 0–3, K Cleary 0–2, D Madden 0–1, P Reale 0–1.

11 September 2021 Round 2	Cappamore	2–13 – 1–18	Mungret/St. Paul's	Childres Road
	L O'Donnell 0–7, J Lonergan 1–3, B Creamer 1–2, J Ryan 0–1.		L Lynch 0–9, N Mulcahy 1–4, B Barry 0–2, B Duff 0–1, E Mulcahy 0–1, C Lenihan 0–1.

19 September 2021 Round 3	Cappamore	1–18 – 1–15	Murroe-Boher	Fr. Hayes Memorial Park
	L O'Donnell 0–11, (0–8 frees), C Berkery 1–1, J Lonergan 0–4 (0–2 frees), B Creamer 0–2.	Report	K Clohessy 0–7, (0–6 frees), G Ryan 1–1 (frees), M Ryan 0–3, A Kennedy 0–2, C Byrnes, J Nicholas 0–1 each.

19 September 2021 Round 3	Mungret/St. Paul's	1–21 – 1–14	Knockainey	Childers Road
	L Lynch 0–10, N Mulcahy 1–4, B Barry 0–2, E Mulcahy 0–2, B O'Meara 0–2, C Lenihan 0–1.		M O'Grady 1–4, P Kirby 0–6, J Lonergan 0–1, D Walsh 0–1, P Barron 0–1, E Cleary 0–1.

=== Group 2 ===
==== Group 2 table ====
Team	Matches				Score			Pts
Team	Pld	W	D	L	For	Against	Diff	Pts
Newcastle West	3	2	0	1	46	55	−9	4
Glenroe	3	2	0	1	53	46	7	4
Dromin-Athlacca	3	1	0	2	55	60	−5	2
Bruff	3	1	0	2	63	56	7	2

==== Group 2 results ====
3 September 2021 Round 1	Bruff	1–14 – 1–15	Glenroe	FitzGerald Park, Kilmallock
	D O'Leary 0–7, B O'Brien 1–0, C Brown 0–3, P Browne 0–2, P O'Riordan 0–1, C Madden 0–1.		M O'Connell 0–8, E O'Mahony 1–1, S Moloney 0–3, B O'Connell 0–2, S Walsh 0–1.

5 September 2021 Round 1	Newcastle West	1–15 – 0–16	Dromin-Athlacca	Mick Neville Park
	D Kelly 1–8, E Hurley 0–2, B Hurley 0–2, B Nix 0–2, E Hurley 0–1.		D Reidy 0–14, D Breen 0–1, J Kelleher 0–1.

10 September 2021 Round 2	Glenroe	0–16 – 0–17	Newcastle West	Mick Neville Park
	M O'Connell 0–5, D McCarthy 0–4, E O'Mahony 0–3, B O'Connell 0–2, E Walsh 0–1, D McCarthy 0–1.		E Hurley 0–5, D Kelly 0–4, B Hurley 0–3, E Hurley 0–2, M Kelly 0–1, B Nix 0–1, M Quilligan 01-.

12 September 2021 Round 2	Dromin-Athlacca	2–21 – 2–17	Bruff	FitzGerald Park, Kilmallock
	D Reidy 0–17, S O'Leary 1–2, J Lenihan 1–0, M Fitzpatrick 0–1.		D O'Leary 1–9, P O'Riordan 1–2, C Browne 0–3, C Madden 0–2, J Hayes 0–1.

19 September 2021 Round 3	Dromin-Athlacca	1–09 – 2–13	Glenroe	Michael Fox Park
	D Reidy 0–5, A Costello 1–0, D Breen 0–2, J Kelleher 0–1, M Reidy 0–1.		M O’Connell (1–7 all from Frees), E Walsh (0–2), B O’Connell (0–2), S Walsh (0–1), D McCarthy (0–1).

19 September 2021 Round 3	Bruff	0–23 – 0–11	Newcastle West	Páirc an Chrócaigh
	D O'Leary (0–7, 0-6F, 0–1 65), C Madden (0–3), C Browne (0–3), P Browne (0–3), B O'Brien (0–2), J Hayes (0–2, 0-1F), J Keating (0–1), P O'Riordan (0–1), K Bonar (0–1).

=== Relegation section ===
==== Playoff ====
2 October 2021 Playoff	Bruff	0–16 – 0–13	Murroe-Boher	Fr. Hayes Memorial Park
	D O'Leary 0–7, K Dillon 0–3, P O'Riordan 0–2, P Browne 0–2, C Browne 0–1, K Bonar 0–1.		M Ryan 0–4, R Kennedy 0–2, G Ryan 0–2, F Hourigan 0–1, K Clohessy 0–1, J Casey 0–1, M Ryan 0–1, D Kennedy 0–1.

=== Knockout stage ===
==== Semi-finals ====
2 October 2021 Semi-final	Mungret/St. Paul's	1–18 – 0–11	Glenroe	FitzGerald Park, Kilmallock
	L Lynch 0–8, P O'Brien 1–3, B Barry 0–3, B O'Meara 0–1, R Duff 0–1, N Mulcahy 0–1, K O'Dowd 0–1.		M O'Connell 0–3, C Kelly 0–2, Z McCarthy 0–1, David McCarthy 0–1, S Clancy 0–1, Diarmuid McCarthy 0–1, E O'Mahony 0–1, E Walsh 0–1.

3 October 2021 Semi-final	Newcastle West	1–06 – 1–18	Cappamore	FitzGerald Park, Kilmallock
	Ethan Hurley 0–4, M McMahon 1–0, D Kelly 0–1, Eoin Hurley 0–1.		L O'Donnell 0–10, J Lonergan 1–2, B Creamer 0–3, D Lonergan 0–1, C Buckley 0–1, T O'Donoghue 0–1.

==== Final ====
24 October 2021 Final	Mungret/St. Paul's	4–17 – 1–12	Cappamore	TUS Gaelic Grounds
	L Lynch 0–8 (7f), N Mulcahy 2–1, B Barry 1–2, B O’Meara 1–1, N O’Brien 0–4, E O’Doherty 0–1.	Report	L O’Donnell 0–7 (7f), R Hanly 1–0, B Creamer 0–2, S Whelan, J Lonergan and C Berkery 0–1 each.	Referee: M Sexton (Bruree)

== Championship statistics ==
=== Top scorers ===
Overall

Rank	Player	Club	Tally	Total	Matches	Average
1	Liam Lynch	Mungret/St. Paul's	2–44	50	5	10.00
2	Liam O'Donnell	Cappamore	1–38	41	5	8.20
3	David Reidy	Dromin-Athlacca	0–36	36	3	12.00
4	Danny O'Leary	Bruff	1–30	33	4	8.25
5	Niall Mulcahy	Mungret/St. Paul's	7–10	31	5	6.20
6	Mark O'Connell	Glenroe	1–23	26	4	6.50
7	Kevin Clohessy	Murroe-Boher	1–22	25	4	6.25
8	Patrick Kirby	Knockainey	1–21	24	3	8.00

In a single game

Rank	Player	Club	Tally	Total	Opposition
1	David Reidy	Dromin-Athlacca	0–17	17	Bruff
2	Liam Lynch	Mungret/St. Paul's	2–09	15	Murroe-Boher
3	David Reidy	Dromin-Athlacca	0–14	14	Newcastle West
4	Danny O'Leary	Bruff	1–09	12	Dromin-Athlacca
5	Patrick Kirby	Knockainey	1–08	11	Cappamore
5	Kevin Clohessy	Murroe-Boher	1–08	11	Knockainey
5	Jamesie Kelly	Newcastle West	1–08	11	Dromin-Athlacca
5	Liam O'Donnell	Cappamore	0–11	11	Murroe-Boher
9	Mark O'Connell	Glenroe	1–07	10	Dromin-Athlacca
9	Liam Lynch	Mungret/St. Paul's	0–10	10	Knockainey
9	Liam O'Donnell	Cappamore	0–10	10	Newcastle West
