= 2020 Limerick Premier Intermediate Hurling Championship =

- Dates: 24 July – 13 September 2020
- Teams: 8
- Sponsor: Lyons of Limerick
- Champions: Kildimo/Pallaskenry (1st title); Kyle Hayes (captain); Natal O'Grady (manager)
- Runners-up: Mungret/St. Paul's; Cian O'Brien (captain); Seánie Barry (manager)
- Relegated: Bruree

Tournament statistics
- Matches played: 16
- Goals scored: 34 (2.13 per match)
- Points scored: 510 (31.88 per match)
- Top scorer(s): Paul O'Brien (2–49)

The 2020 Limerick Premier Intermediate Hurling Championship was the seventh staging of the Limerick Premier Intermediate Hurling Championship since its establishment by the Limerick County Board in 2014. The championship was scheduled to begin in April 2020, however, it was postponed indefinitely due to the impact of the COVID-19 pandemic on Gaelic games. The championship eventually ran from 24 July to 13 September 2020.

The final was played on 13 September 2020 at the LIT Gaelic Grounds in Limerick, between Kildimo–Pallaskenry and Mungret/St Paul's, in what was their first ever meeting in the final. Kildimo–Pallaskenry won the match by 0–22 to 1–13 to claim their first ever championship title in the grade.

Mungret's Paul O'Brien was the championship's top scorer with 2–49.

== Group 1 ==
=== Group 1 table ===
| Team | Matches | | | | Score | | | Pts |
| Team | Pld | W | D | L | For | Against | Diff | Pts |
|---|---|---|---|---|---|---|---|---|
| Bruff | 3 | 3 | 0 | 0 | 69 | 45 | 24 | 6 |
| Glenroe | 3 | 2 | 0 | 1 | 54 | 60 | −6 | 4 |
| Knockainey | 3 | 1 | 0 | 2 | 58 | 68 | −10 | 2 |
| Dromin-Athlacca | 3 | 0 | 0 | 3 | 59 | 67 | −8 | 0 |

=== Group 1 results ===
| 25 July 2020 Round 1 | Bruff | 2–18 – 2–09 | Knockainey | Fr. John Ryan Memorial Park |
| | D O'Leary 0–6, B O'Brien 1–1, P Browne 0–4, P O'Riordan 1–0, S Bulfin 0–2, S Finn 0–1, J Cooke 0–1, K Bonnar 0–1, C Browne 0–1, B McNamara 0–1. | | P Kirby 1–1, D Walsh 0–4, D Madden 1–0, P Barron 0–2, K Cleary 0–2. |

| 25 July 2020 Round 1 | Glenroe | 1–17 – 2–13 | Dromin-Athlacca | FitzGerald Park, Kilmallock |
| | M O'Connell 0–7, B O'Connell 1–2, C Kelly 0–2, E Walsh 0–2, D McCarthy 0–2, S Walsh 0–1, D McCarthy 0–1. | | D Breen 2–3, D Reidy 0–8, S O'Leary 0–2. |

| 1 August 2020 Round 2 | Knockainey | 2–14 – 1–20 | Glenroe | Michael Fox Memorial Park |
| | P Kirby 1–7, J O'Grady 1–0, D Walsh 0–3, P Reale 0–1, K Cleary 0–1, P Barron 0–1, D Byrne 0–1. | | M O'Connell 0–9, C Kelly 1–4, E O'Mahony 0–2, E Walsh 0–2, David McCarthy 0–1, Darren McCarthy 0–1, B O'Connell 0–1. |

| 1 August 2020 Round 2 | Dromin-Athlacca | 1–16 – 2–18 | Bruff | FitzGerald Park, Kilmallock |
| | D Reidy 0–10, D Breen 1–2, S O'Leary 0–2, J Lenihan 0–2. | | D O'Leary 0–8, P O'Riordan 1–2, B McNamara 1–1, C Browne 0–3, S Finn 0–1, J Hayes 0–1, K Bonnar 0–1, P Browne 0–1. |

| 8 August 2020 Round 3 | Dromin-Athlacca | 1–18 – 1–20 | Knockainey | Bruff Sportsfield |

| 8 August 2020 Round 3 | Bruff | 1–18 – 0–11 | Glenroe | Fr. John Ryan Memorial Park |

== Group 2 ==
=== Group 2 table ===
| Team | Matches | | | | Score | | | Pts |
| Team | Pld | W | D | L | For | Against | Diff | Pts |
|---|---|---|---|---|---|---|---|---|
| Mungret/St Paul's | 3 | 2 | 1 | 0 | 58 | 52 | 6 | 5 |
| Kildimo/Pallaskenry | 3 | 2 | 0 | 1 | 63 | 36 | 27 | 4 |
| Cappamore | 3 | 0 | 2 | 1 | 44 | 54 | −10 | 2 |
| Bruree | 3 | 0 | 1 | 2 | 33 | 56 | −23 | 1 |

==== Group 2 results ====
| 24 July 2020 Round 1 | Mungret/St. Paul's | 1–17 – 1–16 | Kildimo/Pallaskenry | Páirc Uí Riain |
| | P O'Brien 1–8, N Mulcahy 0–3, L Harrington 0–2, R Duff 0–1, E O'Doherty 0–1, B Giltenane 0–1, B O'Meara 0–1. | | K Hayes 0–6, L Griffin 0–6, D O'Connell 1–2, C Downes 0–1, S Barry 0–1. |

| 26 July 2020 Round 1 | Cappamore | 0–14 – 0–14 | Bruree | Childers Road |
| | T O'Donoghue 0–7, J Lonergan 0–3, J Fitzgibbon 0–2, C Berkery 0–2. | | S Williams 0–8, S Connolly 0–3, B Sexton 0–1, M Howard 0–1, J O'Brien 0–1. |

| 1 August 2020 Round 2 | Bruree | 1–09 – 0–17 | Mungret/St. Paul's | Bruff Sportsfield |
| | S Cronnolly 1–3, S Williams 0–3, T Cronnolly 0–1, J Leslie 0–1, R O'Halloran 0–1. | | P O'Brien 0–12, B Giltenane 0–2, C O'Brien 0–1, M Mullins 0–1. |

| 1 August 2020 Round 2 | Kildimo/Pallaskenry | 1–16 – 0–09 | Cappamore | Childers Road |
| | D O'Connell 0–5, L Griffin 0–5, K Hayes 1–1, B O'Connell 0–2, C Staff 0–2, L O'Keeffe 0–1. | | T O'Donoghue 0–8, R Hanley 0–1. |

| 8 August 2020 Round 3 | Mungret/St. Paul's | 1–18 – 3–12 | Cappamore | Childers Road |
| | P O'Brien 1–15, C O'Brien 0–1, B Giltenane 0–1, D Larkin 0–1. | | T O'Donoghue 1–6, E Gleeson 1–0, J Lonergan 1–0, J Walsh 0–2, J Ryan 0–1, C O'Brien 0–1, B Leoanrd 0–1, J Lonegan 0–1. |

| 8 August 2020 Round 3 | Bruree | 0–07 – 2–19 | Kildimo/Pallaskenry | Mick Neville Park |
| | | | D O’Connell (2–4), L Griffin (0–5, frees); B O’Connell (0–3, 0–1 free), C Downes (0–2); J Chawke (0–1, free); P Nash (0–1); S Barry (0–1, free), C Staff (0–1), K Hayes (0–1). |

== Relegation stage ==
=== Playoff ===
| 6 September 2020 Playoff | Bruree | 1–19 – 2–25 | Dromin-Athlacca | LIT Gaelic Grounds |
| | R O'Halloran 0–11, S Cronnolly 0–4, JV O'Brien 1–0, F Barrington 0–2, J Leslie 0–1, K O'Dea 0–1. | | D Reidy 1–14, D Breen 1–2, J Kelleher 0–5, S O'Leary 0–2, M Fitzpatrick 0–1, J Linehan 0–1. |

== Knockout stage ==
=== Semi-finals ===
| 5 September 2020 Semi-final | Glenroe | 1–14 – 0–22 | Mungret/St. Paul's | Bruff Sportsfield |
| | M O'Connell 0–11, B O'Connell 1–1, C Kelly 0–1, E O'Mahony 0–1. | | P O'Brien 0–8, N Mulcahy 0–3, E Mulcahy 0–2, C Linehan 0–2, M Mullins 0–2, L Harrington 0–1, B Barry 0–1, B Giltenane 0–1, R Duff 0–1, C Hellewell 0–1. |

| 5 September 2020 Semi-final | Bruff | 0–15 – 3–20 | Kildimo/Pallaskenry | FitzGerald Park |
| | D O'Leary 0–5, S Finn 0–3, P Browne 0–2, C Browne 0–2, C Madden 0–2, C Bulfin 0–1. | | K Hayes 1–5, D O'Connell 1–4, L Griffin 0–4, P Hartigan 1–0, B O'Connell 0–3, S Barry 0–3, C Staff 0–1. |

=== Final ===
| 13 September 2020 Final | Kildimo/Pallaskenry | 0–22 – 1–13 | Mungret/St. Paul's | LIT Gaelic Grounds |
| | L Griffin (5f) and B O’Connell 0–5 each, S Barry 0–4 (2f), K Hayes 0–3, R Maher, P Hartigan, C Staff, D O’Connell, J O’Keeffe 0–1 each. | Report | P O’Brien 0–6 (6f), P Begley 1–2, B Giltenane 0–2, Cian O’Brien, N Mulcahy, C Linehan 0–1 each. | Referee: J O'Halloran (Bruree) |
