= 2016 Limerick Premier Intermediate Hurling Championship =

- Dates: 9 April – 8 October 2016
- Teams: 8
- Sponsor: LIT
- Champions: Monaleen (1st title); Peter Russell (captain); Jimmy Browne (manager)
- Runners-up: Cappamore; Patrick Doyle (captain); Liam Hammersley (manager)
- Relegated: Granagh–Ballingarry; Croom

The 2016 Limerick Premier Intermediate Hurling Championship was the third staging of the Limerick Premier Intermediate Hurling Championship since its establishment by the Limerick County Board in 2014. The championship ran from 9 April to 8 October 2016.

The final was played on 8 October 2016 at FitzGerald Park in Kilmallock, between Monaleen and Cappamore, in what was their first ever meeting in the final. Monaleen won the match by 1–17 to 2–11 to claim their first ever championship title in the grade.

== Team changes ==
=== To Championship ===
Relegated from the Limerick Senior Hurling Championship

- Croom
- Effin

Promoted from the Limerick Intermediate Hurling Championship

- Cappamore
- Feohanagh

=== From Championship ===
Promoted to the Limerick Senior Hurling Championship

- Bruree
- Knockainey

Relegated to the Limerick Intermediate Hurling Championship

- Dromin/Athlacca
- Pallasgreen

== Group stage ==
=== Group stage table ===
Knockout stage Relegated

Team	Matches				Pts
Team	Pld	W	D	L	Pts
Garryspillane	7	6	0	1	12
Monaleen	7	5	0	2	10
Blackrock	7	4	1	2	9
Cappamore	7	3	2	2	8
Effin	7	2	3	2	7
Feohanagh	7	2	1	3	5
Granagh–Ballingarry	7	1	1	5	3
Croom	7	1	0	6	2

== Knockout stage ==
=== Semi-finals ===
24 September 2016 Semi-final	Monaleen	2-11 - 1-11	Blackrock	FitzGerald Park
	A La Touche Cosgrave 1-6, P Russell 1-1, S Mullane 0-1, S Griffin 0-1, G Collins 0-1, J O'Dwyer 0-1.		P Leahy 0-8, B O'Shaughnessy 1-0, M Farrell 0-1, R McCarthy 0-1, S Palmor 0-1.

24 September 2016 Semi-final	Cappamore	2-10 - 1-08	Garryspillane	FitzGerald Park
	C Sheehan 1-1, T O'Donoghue 0-3, J Campbell 1-0, P O'Brien 0-2, C Sheehan 0-1, A Coleman 0-1, J Lonergan 0-1, B Creamer 0-1.		Donie Ryan 0-4, J Ryan 1-0, D Hayes 0-2, S Meade 0-1, M Bourke 0-1.

=== Final ===
8 October 2016 Final	Monaleen	1–17 – 2–11	Cappamore	FitzGerald Park
	A La Touche Cosgrave 1-7, E Doyle 0-5, G Collins 0-2, P Russell 0-1, L Lyons 0-1.		A Murphy 1-2, J Lonergan 1-1, T O'Donoghue 0-3, C Berkery 0-2, C Sheehan 0-1, A Coleman 0-1, P O'Brien 0-1.
