= 2019 Limerick Senior Hurling Championship =

Annual hurling competition season

- Dates: 12 April – 6 October 2019
- Teams: 12
- Sponsor: Bon Secours Hospital
- Champions: Patrickswell (20th title); Cian Lynch (captain); Ciarán Carey (manager)
- Runners-up: Na Piarsaigh; William O'Donoghue (captain); Michael Ryan (manager)
- Relegated: Knockainey

Tournament statistics
- Matches played: 35
- Goals scored: 82 (2.34 per match)
- Points scored: 1139 (32.54 per match)
- Top scorer(s): Seán Tobin (2–53)

The 2019 Limerick Senior Hurling Championship was the 125th staging of the Limerick Senior Hurling Championship since its establishment by the Limerick County Board in 1887. The championship began on 12 April 2019 and ended on 6 October 2019.

Na Piarsaigh were the defending champions.

On 6 October 2019, Patrickswell won the championship after a 1–17 to 0–15 defeat of Na Piarsaigh in the final at the LIT Gaelic Grounds. This was their 20th championship title overall and their first title since 2016.

Murroe-Boher's Seán Tobin was the championship's top scorer with 2–53.

== Team changes ==
=== To Championship ===
Promoted from the Limerick Premier Intermediate Hurling Championship

- Garryspillane

=== From Championship ===
Relegated to the Limerick Premier Intermediate Hurling Championship

- Cappamore

== Results ==
=== Group 1 ===
==== Table ====
Advance to semi-finals Advance to quarter-finals Relegated

Team	Matches				Score			Pts
Team	Pld	W	D	L	For	Against	Diff	Pts
Patrickswell	5	3	2	0	110	85	25	8
Na Piarsaigh	5	4	0	1	146	88	58	8
Kilmallock	5	2	2	1	91	98	−7	6
Doon	5	2	1	2	94	94	0	5
Adare	5	1	1	3	105	111	−6	3
South Liberties	5	0	0	5	72	142	−70	0

==== Results ====
13 April 2019 Round 1	Kilmallock	0–18 – 0–13	Adare	Bruff
	M Houlihan 0–8, G Mulcahy 0–3, R Hanley 0–2, J Mulcahy 0–2, O O'Reilly 0–1, R Egan 0–1, P O'Brien 0–1.		W Griffin 0–7, J Fitzgibbon 0–2, D Hannon 0–2, J Hannon 0–1, M Mackey 0–1.	Referee: J Murphy (Glenroe)

14 April 2019 Round 1	Patrickswell	1–13 – 0–10	Doon	FitzGerald Park, Kilmallock
	D Byrnes 0–5, J Flynn 1–0, A Gillane 0–3, C Lynch 0–2, P O'Brien 0–1, J Gillane 0–1, M Carmody 0–1.		J Ryan 0–4, B Murphy 0–2, D O'Donovan 0–2, D Coleman 0–1, P Ryan 0–1.	Referee: M Sexton (Bruree)

14 April 2019 Round 1	South Liberties	0–10 – 4–20	Na Piarsaigh	Mungret
	B Ryan 0–7, B Nash 0–1, D O'Neill 0–1, B Garry 0–1.		S Dowling 0–8, K Downes 1–3, C Boylan 1–2, D Dempsey 1–1, P Casey 1–1, A Dempsey 0–3, R Lynch 0–2.	Referee: JP Kiely (Croom)

20 April 2019 Round 2	Doon	0–17 – 1–14	Kilmallock	Bruff
	M Ryan 0–4, B Murphy 0–4, D Coleman 0–2, P Cummins 0–2, J Ryan 0–2, D O'Donovan 0–1, P Ryan 0–1, J Ryan 0–1.		O O'Reilly 1–1, J Mulcahy 0–2, G Mulcahy 0–2, R Egan 0–2, P O'Brien 0–2, G O'Mahony 0–2, M Houlihan 0–1, P O'Loughlin 0–1.	Referee: J O'Mahony (Kildimo-Pallaskenry)

20 April 2019 Round 2	Adare	4–22 – 2–13	South Liberties	Bruff
	W Griffin 2–7, J Fitzgibbon 1–6, M Mackey 1–2, R Connolly 0–3, D O'Mahony 0–2, A O'Connell 0–1, E Ryan 0–1.		B Ryan 1–6, S Garry 1–0, B Nash 0–3, B Garry 0–2, D O'Neill 0–1, E Godfrey 0–1.	Referee: J O'Halloran (Bruree)

21 April 2019 Round 2	Na Piarsaigh	1–15 – 2–17	Patrickswell	FitzGerald Park, Kilmallock
	S Dowling 1–11, K Downes 0–1, A Dempsey 0–1, P Casey 0–1, R Lynch 0–1.		K O'Brien 2–1, A Gillane 0–6, A Carroll 0–2, D Byrnes 0–2, J Gillane 0–2, C Lynch 0–1, J Considine 0–1, J Kelleher 0–1, C Carroll 0–1.	Referee: J Murphy (Glenroe)

8 August 2019 Round 3	Na Piarsaigh	6–15 – 2–11	Kilmallock	LIT Gaelic Grounds, Limerick
	P Casey 2–5, S Dowling 1–6, W Henn 1–0, C Boylan 1–0, K Ryan 1–0, K Downes 0–2, D Dempsey 0–1, M Foley 0–1.		P O'Brien 1–3, O O'Reilly 1–0, K O'Connell 0–3, R Hanley 0–2, G o'Mahony 0–2, P O'Loughlin 0–1.	Referee: J O'Mahony (Kildimo-Pallaskenry)

10 August 2019 Round 3	Doon	1–14 – 0–14	Adare	FitzGerald Park, Kilmallock
	D O'Donovan 1–3, P Ryan 0–5, D Coleman 0–5, J Ryan 0–1.		W Griffin 0–9, J Fitzgibbon 0–4, J Gahan 0–1.	Referee: J O'Halloran (Bruree)

10 August 2019 Round 3	Patrickswell	3–17 – 0–12	South Liberties	Childers Road, Limerick
	K O'Brien 2–2, A Gillane 0–7, J Flynn 1–2, D Byrnes 0–2, J Considine 0–1, J Kelleher 0–1, A Carroll 0–1.		B Ryan 0–9, B Nash 0–2, J Hickey 0–1.	Referee: M Sexton (Bruree)

16 August 2019 Round 4	Patrickswell	0–18 – 0–18	Kilmallock	LIT Gaelic Grounds, Limerick
	A Gillane 0–13, A Carroll 0–2, K O'Brien 0–1, N Foley 0–1, D Byrnes 0–1.		P O'Brien 0–5, M Houlihan 0–4, K O'Donnell 0–3, O O'Reilly 0–2, R Egan 0–2, G O'Mahony 0–1, M O'Loughlin 0–1.	Referee: J Murphy (Glenroe)

16 August 2019 Round 4	South Liberties	1–11 – 4–17	Doon	Caherconlish
	B Ryan 0–7, B Garry 1–0, E Quilty 0–1, B Nash 0–1, J Hickey 0–1, E Godfrey 0–1.		D Coleman 0–7, C McNamara 2–0, D Stapleton 1–1, D O'Donovan 0–4, P Cummins 1–0, J Ryan 0–3, P Ryan 0–1, J Hayes 0–1.	Referee: M Sexton (Doon)

17 August 2019 Round 4	Adare	2–11 – 3–21	Na Piarsaigh	Mungret
	B O'Connor 1–2, W Griffin 0–5, C McCarthy 1–0, D Hannon 0–3, E Ryan 0–1.		K Downes 2–2, S Dowling 0–5, A Breen 1–1, W Henn 0–4, P Casey 0–3, A Dempsey 0–2, M Foley 0–1, D Dempsey 0–1, C Boylan 0–1, R Lynch 0–1.	Referee: E Stapleton (Doon)

31 August 2019 Round 5	Na Piarsaigh	3–24 – 3–12	Doon	FitzGerald Park, Kilmallock
	A Breen 2–5, R Lynch 0–7, W Henn 1–3, P Gleeson 0–4, P Casey 0–2, C Houlihan 0–1, K Downes 0–1, T Grimes 0–1.		D O'Donovan 1–5, D Coleman 0–4, C McNamara 1–0, P Ryan 1–0, J Ryan 0–2, E Kiely 0–1.	Referee: M Sexton (Bruree)

31 August 2019 Round 5	Patrickswell	1–24 – 1–24	Adare	LIT Gaelic Grounds, Limerick
	J Kelleher 0–13, J Considine 1–1, D Byrnes 0–3, C Carroll 0–2, K O'Brien 0–1, J Gillane 0–1, J Flynn 0–1, S O'Brien 0–1, A Carroll 0–1.		W Griffin 1–8, D Hannon 0–5, J Fitzgibbon 0–5, M Connolly 0–2, B O'Connor 0–1, J Gahan 0–1, M Mackey 0–1, E Ryan 0–1.	Referee: É Stapleton (Doon)

31 August 2019 Round 5	South Liberties	1–14 – 1–18	Kilmallock	Bruff
	B Ryan 0–9, J Hickey 1–1, B Nash 0–2, B Geary 0–1, D O'Neill 0–1.		M Houlihan 0–8, J Mulcahy 1–4, G O'Mahony 0–2, O O'Reilly 0–1, B Sheehy 0–1, K Hayes 0–1, K O'Donnell 0–1.	Referee: J Hayes (St. Senan's)

=== Group 2 ===
==== Table ====
Promoted and advance to quarter-finals Advance to quarter-finals Relegated

Team	Matches				Score			Pts
Team	Pld	W	D	L	For	Against	Diff	Pts
Ahane	5	4	0	1	92	89	3	8
Ballybrown	5	3	1	1	121	90	31	7
Monaleen	5	2	2	1	94	101	−7	6
Murroe-Boher	5	0	4	1	95	96	−1	4
Garryspillane	5	1	2	2	90	94	−4	4
Knockainey	5	1	0	4	78	100	−22	2

==== Results ====
12 April 2019 Round 1	Monaleen	1–17 – 0–17	Ahane	Childers Road, Limerick
	M O'Dwyer 0–8, G Collins 1–2, D Moloney 0–4, J Nicolas 0–1, L Lyons 0–1, A La Touch-Cosgrave 0–1.		T Morrissey 0–12, P O'Halloran 0–2, W Brennan 0–2, K Enright 0–1.	Referee: R Moloney (Bruff)

12 April 2019 Round 1	Ballybrown	1–23 – 0–13	Knockainey	Bruff
	A Cliffe 0–5, D Hall 0–4, R Griffin 1–0, S Kenny 0–3, J Adams 0–3, B Griffin 0–2, K Loftus 0–2, K Gavin 0–2, M Kiely 0–1, L Doolan 0–1.		J Lonergan 0–4, K Cleary 0–3, M O'Grady 0–3, P Barron 0–1, D Walsh 0–1, D Madden 0–1.	Referee: M Doherty (Mungret/St. Paul's)

14 April 2019 Round 1	Murroe-Boher	0–18 – 2–12	Garryspillane	Caherconlish
	S Tobin 0–9, J Casey 0–3, F Hourigan 0–2, D Sheehan 0–2, A Kennedy 0–1, M Dee 0–1.		D Ryan 1–4, C Ryan 0–4, J Ryan 1–0, E Sheehan 0–2, D O'Shea 0–1, R Tobin 0–1.	Referee: J O'Mahony

19 April 2019 Round 2	Ballybrown	0–14 – 1–13	Ahane	Cappamore
	A Cliffe 0–8, J Adams 0–2, K Loftus 0–1, K Gavin 0–1, M Kiely 0–1, K Power 0–1.		T Morrissey 0–9, W Brennan 1–0, N Moran 0–2, A Hackett 0–1, D Morrissey 0–1.	Referee: P Lyons (Staker Wallace)

20 April 2019 Round 2	Garryspillane	2–13 – 0–19	Monaleen	Caherconlish
	D Ryan 0–11, J Kerins 2–0, R Tobin 0–1, E Sheehan 0–1.		M O'Dwyer 0–9, G Collins 0–3, L Lyons 0–3, D Golden-O'Mahony 0–2, J Nicholas 0–1, E Doyle 0–1.	Referee: D O'Callaghan (Feohanagh-Castlemahon)

21 April 2019 Round 2	Knockainey	1–13 – 0–16	Murroe-Boher	Caherconlish
	D Walsh 0–5, K Cleary 0–4, K Moloney 1–0, D Madden 0–2, P Barron 0–1, M O'Grady 0–1.		S Tobin 0–12, J Casey 0–2, A Kennedy 0–1, D Dunlea 0–1.

11 August 2019 Round 3	Garryspillane	1–13 – 3–09	Ahane	Cappamore
	D O'Shea 1–5, D Ryan 0–4, J Kerins 0–2, C Sheehan 0–1, C Ryan 0–1.		T Morrissey 0–8, R Fox 1–0, C O'Mara 1–0, D Morrissey 1–0, W Brennan 0–1.	Referee: JP Kiely (Croom)

11 August 2019 Round 3	Murroe-Boher	2–18 – 1–21	Ballybrown	Bruff
	S Tobin 2–11, D Sheehan 0–2, M Ryan 0–2, D Kennedy 0–1, S Hickey 0–1, M Dee 0–1.		A Cliffe 0–12, S Kenny 1–3, S O'Reilly 0–2, M Kiely 0–2, R Kenny 0–1, L Doolan 0–1.	Referee: M Sexton (Bruree)

11 August 2019 Round 3	Knockainey	2–15 – 0–22	Monaleen	Childers Road, Limerick
	P Barron 1–7, D Walsh 0–4, M O'Grady 0–3, K Clancy 1–0, J Lonergan 0–1.		M O'Dwyer 0–9, E Doyle 0–4, L Lyons 0–3, A Nicholas 0–2, G Collins 0–2, D Power 0–1, A La Touch-Cosgrave 0–1.	Referee: D O'Callaghan (Feohanagh/Castlemahon)

16 August 2019 Round 4	Ballybrown	2–22 – 1–16	Garryspillane	Bruff
	A Cliffe 0–11, S Kenny 2–3, B Griffin 0–2, M Kiely 0–2, S O'Reilly 0–1, L Doolan 0–1, K Gavin 0–1, J Adams 0–1.		D O'Shea 1–8, E Sheehan 0–3, C Ryan 0–3, J Kerins 0–2.	Referee: E Stapleton (Doon)

17 August 2019 Round 4	Monaleen	0–15 – 0–15	Murroe-Boher	Cappamore
	M O'Dwyer 0–11, L Lyons 0–4.		S Tobin 0–11, M Ryan 0–2, D Kennedy 0–1, D Sheehan 0–1.	Referee: P Lyons (Staker Wallace)

17 August 2019 Round 4	Ahane	1–15 – 0–17	Knockainey	Caherconlish
	T Morrissey 0–8, D Morrissey 1–2, N Moran 0–3, W Brennan 0–1, R Fox 0–1.		P Barron 0–5, D Walsh 0–3, M O'Grady 0–2, J O'Grady 0–2, K Cleary 0–2, J Lonergan 0–2, R Lonergan 0–1.	Referee: E Phelan (St. Patrick's)

1 September 2019 Round 5	Knockainey	1–08 – 0–18	Garryspillane	FitzGerald Park, Kilmallock
	P Barron 1–3, D Walsh 0–2, M O'Grady 0–1, K Cleary 0–1, R Lonergan 0–1.		D O'Shea 0–8, E Sheehan 0–3, D Ryan 0–2, C Sheehan 0–2, J Ryan 0–2, J Kerins 0–1.	Referee: J O'Halloran (Bruree)

1 September 2019 Round 5	Murroe-Boher	1–19 – 2–17	Ahane	Caherconlish
	S Tobin 0–10, J Casey 1–2, M Dee 0–2, D Sheehan 0–1, D Kennedy 0–1, B Cusack 0–1, M Ryan 0–1, S Hickey 0–1.		T Morrissey 0–9, N Moran 0–7, D Morrissey 2–0, R Fox 0–1.	Referee: J O'Mahony (Kildimo-Pallaskenry)

1 September 2019 Round 5	Ballybrown	1–26 – 2–12	Monaleen	Childers Road, Limerick
	A Cliffe 0–12, S Kenny 1–1, L Doolan 0–3, K Power 0–2, M Kiely 0–2, B Griffin 0–2, R Griffin 0–2, K Gavin 0–1, S O'Reilly 0–1.		M O'Dwyer 1–9, L Murphy 1–0, E Doyle 0–1, G Collins 0–1, L Lyons 0–1.	Referee: D O'Callaghan (Feohanagh-Castlemahon)

=== Knock-out stage ===
==== Quarter-finals ====
15 September 2019 Quarter-final	Ahane	1–14 – 0–22	Kilmallock	LIT Gaelic Grounds, Limerick
	N Moran 1–5, T Morrissey 0–7, R Fox 0–2.		M Houlihan 0–6, J Mulcahy 0–5, G Mulcahy 0–4, K O'Donnell 0–2, R Hanley 0–1, P O'Brien 0–1, P O'Loughlin 0–1, O O'Reilly 0–1, G O'Mahony 0–1.	Referee: J O'Halloran (Bruree)

15 September 2019 Quarter-final	Ballybrown	2–15 – 1–23	Doon	LIT Gaelic Grounds, Limerick
	A Cliffe 0–8, S Kenny 1–0, R Griffin 1–0, K Gavin 0–3, B Griffin 0–2, M Kiely 0–1, J Adams 0–1.		D O'Donovan 0–8, J Ryan 0–4, D Coleman 0–4, C Ryan 1–0, J Ryan 0–3, P Cummins 0–2, D Moloney 0–1, D Stapleton 0–1.	Referee: M Sexton (Bruree)

==== Semi-finals ====
22 September 2019 Semi-final	Patrickswell	2–14 – 0–15	Doon	LIT Gaelic Grounds, Limerick
	K O’Brien (1–3); A Gillane (0–4, frees); D Byrnes (0–3, frees), J Gillane (1–0); C Lynch, J Kelleher, T O’Brien, J Considine (0–1 each).	Report	O’Donovan (0–5)(4 frees, 1 sideline); D Coleman (0–4, frees); P Ryan (0–2); R English, P Cummins, D Stapleton, J Ryan (0–1 each)	Referee: J Murphy (Glenroe)

22 September 2019 Semi-final	Na Piarsaigh	0–23 – 0–18	Kilmallock	LIT Gaelic Grounds, Limerick
	W Henn (0–13, 9 frees, 2 65s); A Breen (0–3); K Downes, D Dempsey, A Dempsey, T Grimes, W O’Donoghue, R Lynch (free), P Kennedy (free)(0–1 each).	Report	M Houlihan (0–9, 8 frees, 1 65); K O’Donnell (0–3); R Hanley, J Mulcahy (1 free)(0–2 each).; G O’Mahony, P O’Brien (0–1 each).	Referee: M Sexton (Bruree)

==== Final ====
6 October 2019 Final	Patrickswell	1–17 – 0–15	Na Piarsaigh	LIT Gaelic Grounds, Limerick
	A Gillane 0–6 (6fs), J Considine 1–2, C Lynch 0–3, D Byrnes (1f), J Kelleher 0–2 each, A Carroll, T O'Brien 0–1 each.	Report	P Casey 0–7 (1f), W Henn 0–3 (3fs), A Breen 0–2, R Lynch, D Dempsey, A Dempsey all 0–1 each.	Referee: J O'Halloran (Bruree)

== Championship statistics ==
=== Top scorers ===
Top scorers overall

Rank	Player	Club	Tally	Total	Matches	Average
1	Seán Tobin	Murroe-Boher	2–53	59	5	11.80
2	Andrew Cliffe	Ballybrown	0–56	56	6	9.33
3	Tom Morrissey	Ahane	0–53	53	6	8.83
4	Mark O'Dwyer	Monaleen	1–46	49	5	9.80
5	Willie Griffin	Adare	3–36	45	5	9.00
6	Brian Ryan	South Liberties	1–38	41	5	8.20
7	Aaron Gillane	Patrickswell	0–39	39	6	6.50
8	Shane Dowling	Na Piarsaigh	2–30	36	4	9.00
8	Micheál Houlihan	Kilmallock	0–36	36	7	5.14
9	Darragh O'Donovan	Doon	2–28	34	7	4.85

Top scorers in a single game

Rank	Player	Club	Tally	Total	Opposition
1	Seán Tobin	Murroe-Boher	2–11	17	Ballybrown
2	Shane Dowling	Na Piarsaigh	1–11	14	Patrickswell
3	Willie Griffin	Adare	2-07	13	South Liberties
3	William Henn	Na Piarsaigh	0–13	13	Kilmallock
3	Aaron Gillane	Patrickswell	0–13	13	Kilmallock
3	Jack Kelleher	Patrickswell	0–13	13	Adare
4	Mark O'Dwyer	Monaleen	1-09	12	Ballybrown
4	Andrew Cliffe	Ballybrown	0–12	12	Monaleen
4	Tom Morrissey	Ahane	0–12	12	Monaleen
4	Seán Tobin	Murroe-Boher	0–12	12	Knockainey
4	Andrew Cliffe	Ballybrown	0–12	12	Murroe-Boher

== Championship statistics ==
=== Miscellaneous ===
- Patrickswell win a record 20th title to go top of the Roll of Honour.
