= 2025 Limerick Premier Intermediate Hurling Championship =

- Dates: 24 July – 19 October 2025
- Teams: 8
- Sponsor: Lyons of Limerick
- Champions: Garryspillane (2nd title); Colin Ryan (captain); Aaron Considine (manager)
- Runners-up: Effin; Tommy Quaid (captain); Adrian Barrett (manager)
- Relegated: South Liberties

Tournament statistics
- Matches played: 32
- Goals scored: 74 (2.31 per match)
- Points scored: 1079 (33.72 per match)
- Top scorer(s): Patrick O'Donovan (4-77)

The 2025 Limerick Premier Intermediate Hurling Championship was the 12th staging of the Limerick Premier Intermediate Hurling Championship since its establishment by the Limerick County Board in 2014. The draws for the group stage pairings took place on 21 January 2025. The championship ran from 24 July to 19 October 2025.

The final was played on 19 October 2025 at the TUS Gaelic Grounds in Limerick, between Garryspillane and Effin, in what was their first ever meeting in the final. Garryspillane won the match after beating Effin 3–0 in a penalty shoot-out following a 4–19 to 2–25 draw at the conclusion of extra time. It was their second championship title overall and a first championship title in seven years.

Effin's Patrick O'Donovan was the championship's top scorer with 4-77.

== Team changes ==
=== To Championship ===
Relegated from the Limerick Senior Hurling Championship

- South Liberties

Promoted from the Limerick Intermediate Hurling Championship

- Croagh-Kilfinny

=== From Championship ===
Promoted to the Limerick Senior Hurling Championship

- Newcastle West

Relegated to the Limerick Intermediate Hurling Championship

- Na Piarsaigh

== Participating teams ==
| Team | Location | Colours | Manager | Captain(s) |
|---|---|---|---|---|
| Blackrock | Kilfinane | Green and white | Jimmy Quilty | |
| Bruff | Bruff | Red and white | Paddy O'Leary | |
| Croagh-Kilfinny | Croagh | Blue and white | James Hall | Denis Lenihan; James Lanigan |
| Effin | Effin | Green and white | Adrian Barrett | Tommy Quaid |
| Garryspillane | Knocklong | Black and amber | Aaron Considine | Colin Ryan |
| Glenroe | Glenroe | Green and black | Danny Murphy | David McCarthy |
| Granagh-Ballingarry | Ballingarry | Green and black | John O'Connor | Damien O'Donovan |
| South Liberties | Raheen | Green and yellow | Albert McSweeney | Eoghan Godfrey |

== Group stage ==
=== Group stage table ===
Knockout stage Relegation stage

| Team | Matches | | | | Score | | | Pts |
| Team | Pld | W | D | L | For | Against | Diff | Pts |
|---|---|---|---|---|---|---|---|---|
| Effin | 7 | 5 | 1 | 1 | 163 | 147 | 16 | 11 |
| Garryspillane | 7 | 5 | 1 | 1 | 159 | 121 | 38 | 11 |
| Croagh-Kilfinny | 7 | 4 | 0 | 3 | 153 | 136 | 17 | 8 |
| Blackrock | 7 | 3 | 0 | 4 | 147 | 136 | 11 | 6 |
| Bruff | 7 | 3 | 0 | 4 | 132 | 138 | −6 | 6 |
| Granagh-Ballingarry | 7 | 3 | 0 | 4 | 126 | 136 | −10 | 6 |
| South Liberties (R) | 7 | 2 | 0 | 5 | 114 | 158 | −44 | 4 |
| Glenroe | 7 | 1 | 2 | 4 | 132 | 154 | −22 | 4 |

=== Group stage results ===
| 24 July 2025 Round 1 | Effin | 0–16 – 1–21 | Croagh-Kilfinny | Mick Neville Park |
| | P O'Donovan (0–6, 0–5 frees), C Doherty, F O'Connor and N Quaid 0–2 each, E Dillon, B Clifford, R O'Connor and C O'Riordan 0–1 each | Report | C O'Carroll (1–12, 1–0 penalty, 0–8 frees, 0–1 sideline cut), S Hickey 0–4, A Meade, A Shanagher, T McMahon, O Dee and J Lanigan 0–1 each |

| 25 July 2025 Round 1 | Granagh-Ballingarry | 1–18 – 0–19 | Glenroe | FitzGerald Park |
| | S O'Connor 1–3, L Flynn 0–6 (0–4 frees), M Russell, D Casey 0–3 each, P Murphy 0–2, J Harnett 0–1. | Report | D Frewen 0–8 (0–4 frees), D McCarthy 0–4 (all frees), A Frewen 0–3, L Dennehy 0–2, B O'Connell, M O'Connell 0–1 each. |

| 26 July 2025 Round 1 | Garryspillane | 1–21 – 0–12 | South Liberties | Bruff Grounds |
| | B Heavey 1–5, H Flanagan 0–7 (5 frees), D O'Shea 0–3 (1 free), C Sheehan 0–2, D Heavey, S Ryan, C Ryan, J English 0–1 each; | Report | K Byrnes 0–7 (4 frees), B Nash 0–2 (1 free), S Holland, J Hickey (sideline cut), S Fitzpatrick 0–1 each. |

| 27 July 2025 Round 1 | Blackrock | 1–19 – 0–15 | Bruff | Knocklong Sportsfield |
| | C O'Keeffe 1–5, J Quilty (2 frees), P Leahy (1 free) 0–3 each, S O'Neill, I O'Brien 0–2 each, K Ahern, S Lyons, S Dwyer, M Farrell (sideline cut) 0–1 each; | Report | O Meaney 0–6 (4 frees), D Butler 0–4, D O'Leary 0–3, B Callinan, K Bonner 0–1 each. |

| 31 July 2025 Round 2 | Glenroe | 1–15 – 0–18 | Effin | Michael Fox Park |
| | D Frewen 0–9 (7 frees, 1 '65'), D McCarthy 0–3 (3 frees), M O'Connell 1–0, L Dennehy 0–2, A Frewen 0–1. | Report | P O'Donovan 0–13 ( 10 frees, 1 '65'), F O'Connor 0–2, E Dillon, C O'Riordan, R O'Connor 0–1 each; |

| 1 August 2025 Round 2 | Bruff | 0–13 – 1–20 | Garryspillane | FitzGerald Park |
| | J Keating 0–3 (3 frees), O Meaney (2 frees), K Bonner, S Finn 0–2 each, D O'Leary, P O'Riordan, P Browne, D Butler 0–1 each. | Report | H Flanagan 0–8 (0–5 frees, 0–1 '65', 0–1 penalty), C Ryan 1–1, D O'Shea 0–3, J Morrissey, B Heavey, M Quinlan 0–2 each, E O'Mahony, R Sampson 0–1 each; |

| 1 August 2025 Round 2 | Croagh-Kilfinny | 1–26 – 2–15 | Blackrock | Paddy Carroll Park |
| | C O’Carroll 0–9 (0–8 frees), S O’Carroll 0–6, J Lanigan 1–2, S Hickey 0–4, S Lenihan 0–2, J Wall, B Flynn, C Lenihan 0–1 each. | Report | P Leahy 2–3 (1–1 frees), M Farrell 0–5 (0–5 frees), J Quilty 0–3 (0–1 free), R O’Shaughnessy 0–2, A Gilligan 0–1. |

| 2 August 2025 Round 2 | South Liberties | 0–14 – 1–19 | Granagh-Ballingarry | Brother Rice Field |
| | K Byrnes (0–10) (7f), B Nash (0–2), S Holland (0–2). | Report | L Flynn (0–10) (7f), S O'Connor (1–2), P Murphy (0–2), D Casey (0–1), D Connor (0–1) (1f), B Sheedy (0–1), M Russell (0–1), T Horgan (0–1). |

| 7 August 2025 Round 3 | Glenroe | 0–17 – 0–20 | South Liberties | Doon Grounds |
| | D Frewen 0–8 ( 4 frees), D McCarthy (3 frees), L Dennehy 0–3 each, O Browne, C Kelly, S O'Donnell 0–1 each. | Report | B Nash, K Byrnes (3 frees, 1 '65') 0–5 each, B Garry 0–4, B Cooney 0–2, S Kilcoyne, J Hickey, E McSweeney, S Fitzpatrick 0–1 each. |

| 8 August 2025 Round 3 | Granagh-Ballingarry | 0–11 – 0–16 | Bruff | Michael Fox Park |
| | L Flynn 0–8, S O'Connor 0–1, M Russell 0–1, B Sheedy 0–1. | Report | O Meaney 0–9, P Browne 0–2, B Callinan 0–1, J Keating 0–1, D O'Leary 0–1, D Butler 0–1, C Cronin 0–1. |

| 8 August 2025 Round 3 | Effin | 3–20 – 4–15 | Blackrock | FitzGerald Park |
| | P O’Donovan 3–11, (0-8frees), R O’Connor 0–4, E Dillon 0–2, S Canning, P O’Kelly and F O’Connor 0–1 each. | Report | P Leahy 3–2 (1–0 pen), J Quilty 0–7 (4frees), C O'Keeffe 0–4 (1free), C Ensor 1–0, K Aherne and S Philpot 0–1 each. |

| 8 August 2025 Round 3 | Garryspillane | 1–20 – 1–19 | Croagh-Kilfinny | Paddy Carroll Park |
| | H Flanagan 0–10 (9 frees), D O’Shea 0–5 (2 frees), C Ryan 1–1, D Heavey and B Heavey 0–2 each. | Report | C O’Carrol 0–12 (8frees, 2 ‘65), S Lenihan 1–0, J Lanigan and B Flynn 0–2 each, S Hickey, B Lenihan and J Lenihan 0–1 each. |

| 21 August 2025 Round 4 | Croagh-Kilfinny | 2–24 – 1–13 | Granagh-Ballingarry | Mick Neville Park |
| | C O'Carroll 0–12 (7 frees, 1 '65'), A Meade, J Lanigan 1–3 each, B Flynn 0–3, S O'Carroll, C Lenihan, N Leahy 0–1 each; | Report | L Flynn 0–6 (5 frees), M Russell 0–3, T Horgan 1–0, P Murphy 0–2, E Horgan, D O'Connor (free) 0–1 each. |

| 22 August 2025 Round 4 | Bruff | 0–23 – 1–25 | Glenroe | Knocklong Sportsfield |
| | O Meaney 0–12 (6f, 2 65), D O’Leary 0–3, D Butler 0–2, J Keating 0–2, C Cronin 0–2, P Browne 0–1. | Report | D Frewen 0–11 (4f, 2 65), D Dennehy 1–2, A Frewen 0–2, D McCarthy 0–3 (3f), C Kelly 0–3, O Browne 0–1, B O’Connell 0–1. |

| 22 August 2025 Round 4 | South Liberties | 1–18 – 2–22 | Effin | Bruff Grounds |
| | K Byrnes 1–10 (0–10 frees), B Nash 0–5 (1 sideline cut, 1 free), B Garry 0–2, J Hickey 0–1. | Report | P O'Donovan 0–14 (14 frees), C O'Riordan 1–2, R O'Connor 1–1, E Dillon 0–2, F O'Connor, E Kelly, N Quaid 0–1 each; |

| 23 August 2025 Round 4 | Blackrock | 0–12 – 4–15 | Garryspillane | FitzGerald Park |
| | C O'Keeffe 0–5 (1 free), J Quilty 0–3 (2 frees), K Ahern, C Ensor, S O'Neill, P Leahy 0–1 each. | Report | H Flanagan 2–6 (0–4 frees), C Ryan 1–1, B Heavey 1–0, D O'Shea, M Donovan 0–2 each, R Tobin, C Sheehan, S Philpot, J English 0–1 each; |

| 28 August 2025 Round 5 | Effin | 1–23 – 0–24 | Garryspillane | FitzGerald Park |
| | P O’Donovan 0–9 (6f, 1s/l), B Clifford 1–5, P O’Kelly 0–3, F O’Connor and C Doherty 0–2 each, C O’Riordan and E Dillon 0–1 each; | Report | C Ryan 0–7 (5f), S Ryan 0–5, D O’Shea 0–4 (1f, 1s/l), R Tobin 0–3, J English, D Heavey, C Sheehan, E O’Mahony and C Sheehan 0–1 each. |

| 28 August 2025 Round 5 | South Liberties | 1–14 – 1–23 | Bruff | Ballybrown Grounds |
| | K Byrnes 0–8 (6 frees), D Godfrey 1–0, B Nash 0–2 (1 free), B Garry, S Holland, E Godfrey (free) 0–1 each. | Report | O Meaney 0–11 (8 frees), J Keating 1–5 (0–1 free), P Browne 0–3, G Bracken 0–2, C Cronin 0–1; |

| 29 August 2025 Round 5 | Glenroe | 1–13 – 1–16 | Croagh-Kilfinny | Bruff Grounds |
| | D Frewen 0–9 (8 frees), D McCarthy 0–3 (3 frees), C Kelly 1–0, J Sheehy 0–1. | Report | C O'Carroll 1–10 (0–8 frees), A Meade 0–2, J Wall, C Lenihan, J Lenihan, S Lenihan 0–1 each; |

| 30 August 2025 Round 5 | Granagh-Ballingarry | 1–21 – 1–18 | Blackrock | Paddy Carroll Park |
| | L Flynn 0–7 (6 frees), D O'Connor 1–2 (0–2 frees, 1–0 penalty), D Casey, J Mulcaire 0–3 each, M Russell 0–2, E Horgan, T Horgan, R Mullane, J Mulqueen 0–1 each; | Report | C O'Keeffe 1–6 (0–4 frees), J Quilty (4 frees), P Leahy (1 free) 0–4 each; C Gilligan, S O'Neill, R O'Shaughnessy, L Walsh 0–1 each. |

| 12 September 2025 Round 6 | Croagh-Kilfinny | 1-14 - 2-13 | South Liberties | Brother Rice Field |
| | C O'Carroll 1-6 (0-4 frees, 0-1 '65'), A Meade 0-3, S O'Carroll 0-2, C Lenihan, J Wall, T McMahon 0-1 each. | Report | K Byrnes 0-7 (7 frees), J Hickey 1-2, B Garry 1-1, S Brosnahan, D Godfrey, E Godfrey 0-1 each; |

| 13 September 2025 Round 6 | Garryspillane | 2-09 - 0-13 | Granagh-Ballingarry | Paddy Carroll Park |
| | H Flanagan 1-5 (0-3 frees), C Sheahan 1-0, M Donovan 0-1, D O’Shea 0-2, C Ryan 0-1. | Report | L Flynn 0-7 (0-5 frees), M Russel 0-2, B Sheedy 0-1, J Mulcaire 0-1, E Horgan 0-1, T Horgan 0-1. |

| 13 September 2025 Round 6 | Bruff | 0-14 - 3-16 | Effin | FitzGerald Park |
| | O Meaney 0-5 (all frees), P Browne 0-2, D O'Leary 0-2, P O'Riordan, K Bonner, D Butler, M O'Riordan, C Cronin 0-1 each. | Report | P O'Donovan 1-4 (0-3 frees), F Herr, C O'Riordan 1-2 each, E Dillon, P O'Kelly 0-2 each, N Quaid (free), S Canning, F O'Connor, C Kearney 0-1 each. |

| 13 September 2025 Round 6 | Blackrock | 5-15 - 1-08 | Glenroe | Knocklong Sportsfield |
| | C O'Keeffe 2-3 (0-2 frees), J Quilty 1-4 (0-3 frees), P Leahy 1-3 (1-0 pen, 0-2 frees), S O'Neill 1-1, S Lyons, C Ensor, S Philpott, R O'Shaughnessy 0-1 each. | Report | D Frewen 0-6, 0-5 frees), A Frewen 1-0, M O'Connell, E Fitzgerald 0-1 each. |

| 20 September 2025 Round 7 | Glenroe | 3-14 - 1-20 | Garryspillane | Michael Fox Park |
| | D Frewen 0-10 (0-7 frees), O Browne 2-0, D Dennehy 1-0, L Dennehy 0-3 and D McCarthy (free) 0-1 each. | Report | H Flanagan 0-11 (0-10 frees), C Sheehan 1-4, B Heavey 0-2, C Ryan, M Donovan and D Heavey 0-1 each; |

| 20 September 2025 Round 7 | Effin | 0-21 - 0-19 | Granagh-Ballingarry | Paddy Carroll Park |
| | F O’Connor, F Herr (0-4 frees) 0-5 each, P O’Donovan 0-4 (0-3 frees), N Quaid, C O’Riordan, B Clifford, E Dillon, P O’Kelly, C Doherty, C Kearney 0-1 each. | Report | L Flynn 0-11 (0-10 frees), S O’Connor 0-3, B Sheedy 0-2, M Russell, E Lynch, J Cagney 0-1 each. |

| 20 September 2025 Round 7 | Bruff | 3-16 - 0-12 | Croagh-Kilfinny | Ballybrown Grounds |
| | S Finn 3-1, J Keating, O Meaney (3 frees, 1 '65'), P Browne 0-4 each, D O'Leary, K Bonner, B O'Brien 0-1 each; | Report | C O'Carroll 0-5 (5 frees), J Lanigan, B Hannon 0-2 each, C Lenihan, D Lynch (free), B Lenihan (free) 0-1 each. |

| 20 September 2025 Round 7 | South Liberties | 0-11 - 2-18 | Blackrock | Mick Neville Park |
| | K Byrnes 0-5 (4f, 1 65), B Nash 0-2 (1f), S Kilcoyne 0-1, B Garry 0-1, J Hickey 0-1, S Holland 0-1. | Report | C O’Keeffe 0-7 (4f), P Leahy 0-4, S O’Neill 1-2, R O’Shaughnessy 1-1, M Farrell 0-2, J Quilty 0-1 (1f), C Considine 0-1. |

== Relegation stage ==
=== Relegation playoff ===
| 4 October 2025 Playoff | Glenroe | 1-18 - 0-11 | South Liberties | Knocklong Sportsfield |
| | D McCarthy 1-6 (1-0 penalty, 0-4 frees), D Frewen 0-6 (5 frees), S O'Donoghue, L Dennehy, B O'Connell, C Kelly, D Dennehy, Z McCarthy 0-1 each; | Report | K Byrnes (3 frees), B Nash (2 frees, 1 '65') 0-3 each, B Garry 0-2, J Hickey, D O'Neill, D Godfrey 0-1 each. |

== Knockout stage ==
=== Semi-finals ===
| 4 October 2025 Semi-final | Croagh-Kilfinny | 1-11 - 1-12 | Garryspillane | Ballyagran Grounds |
| | C O’Carroll 0-8 (4fs, 2’65s) D Lynch 1-1 (1-1f), A Meade and C Lenihan 0-1 each. | Report | H Flanagan 0-5 (2f, 2 ‘65s), C Sheehan 1-1, J English and D O’Shea 0-2 each, R Tobin and C Ryan 0-1 each; |

| 4 October 2025 Semi-final | Blackrock | 1-13 - 4-14 | Effin | FitzGerald Park |
| | P Leahy (1-4, 1-2 frees), C O'Keefe (0-4, 0-4 frees), M Farrell (0-2, 0-1 free), J Quilty 0-2 and C Considine 0-1 | Report | F Herr (2-1, 0-1 free), F O'Connor 0-3, T Quaid (0-5, 0-4 frees, 0-1 65), P O'Kelly and R O'Connor 1-0 each N Quaid (0-2, 0-2 frees), C O'Riordan, C Kearney and E Dillon 0-1 each. |

=== Final ===
| 19 October 2025 Final | Effin | 2-25 - 4-19 (aet); Penalties: 0-3 | Garryspillane | TUS Gaelic Grounds |
| | P O'Donovan (0-16, 0-13 frees, 0-1 65), R O'Connor and C Kearney 1-0, C O'Riordan 0-2, E Dillon 0-3, P O'Kelly, E Kelly, F O'Connor, and A Moffatt 0-1 each. | Report | C Ryan 1-1, C Sheehan 1-3, J English 0-3, H Flanagan (2-6, 0-5 frees), D O'Shea 0-2, D Heavey, R Sampson, M Donovan and J Dineen 0-1 each |

== Championship statistics ==
=== Top scorers ===
| Rank | Player | Club | Tally | Total | Matches | Average |
|---|---|---|---|---|---|---|
| 1 | Patrick O'Donovan | Effin | 4–77 | 89 | 8 | 11.12 |
| 2 | Cian O'Carroll | Croagh-Kilfinny | 3–74 | 83 | 8 | 10.37 |
| 3 | Hugh Flanagan | Garryspillane | 5–58 | 73 | 8 | 9.12 |
| 4 | Darren Frewen | Glenroe | 0–67 | 67 | 8 | 8.37 |
| 5 | Ken Byrnes | South Liberties | 1–55 | 58 | 8 | 7.25 |
| 5 | Luke Flynn | Granagh-Ballingarry | 0–55 | 55 | 7 | 7.85 |
| 7 | Owen Meaney | Bruff | 0–49 | 49 | 7 | 7.00 |
| 8 | Colm O'Keeffe | Blackrock | 4–34 | 46 | 8 | 5.75 |
| 9 | Paudie Leahy | Blackrock | 7–24 | 45 | 8 | 5.62 |
