= 2015 Limerick Premier Intermediate Hurling Championship =

- Dates: 30 April – 24 October 2015
- Teams: 8
- Sponsor: LIT
- Champions: Bruree (1st title); Shane Mullane (captain); Stephen McDonagh (manager)
- Runners-up: Knockainey; Dermot Walsh (captain); Natal O'Grady (manager)
- Relegated: Dromin/Athlacca; Pallasgreen

The 2015 Limerick Premier Intermediate Hurling Championship was the second staging of the Limerick Premier Intermediate Hurling Championship since its establishment by the Limerick County Board in 2014. The championship ran from 30 April to 24 October 2015.

The final was played on 24 October 2015 at FitzGerald Park in Kilmallock, between Bruree and Knockainey, in what was their first ever meeting in the final. Bruree won the match by 3–07 to 0–13 to claim their first ever championship title in the grade.

== Team changes ==
=== To Championship ===
Relegated from the Limerick Senior Hurling Championship

- Granagh-Ballingarry
- Knockainey

Promoted from the Limerick Intermediate Hurling Championship

- Monaleen
- Pallasgreen

=== From Championship ===
Promoted to the Limerick Senior Hurling Championship

- Bruff
- Croom

Relegated to the Limerick Intermediate Hurling Championship

- Hospital–Herbertstown
- Knockaderry

== Group stage ==
=== Group stage table ===
Knockout stage Relegated

Team	Matches				Pts
Team	Pld	W	D	L	Pts
Knockainey	7	5	1	1	11
Bruree	7	4	2	1	10
Monaleen	7	4	0	3	8
Garryspillane	7	4	0	3	8
Blackrock	7	3	1	3	7
Granagh–Ballingarry	7	3	0	4	6
Dromin/Athlacca	7	1	1	5	3
Pallasgreen	7	1	1	5	3

=== Group stage results ===
10 April 2015 Round 1	Monaleen	0-11 - 0-19	Bruree	Clarina Grounds

11 April 2015 Round 1	Blackrock	3-13 - 1-17	Dromin/Athlacca	FitzGerald Park
	P Leahy 1-4, R Murphy 2-0, M Farrell 0-6, R McCarthy 0-2, D Moloney 0-1.		P Neenan 0-5, D Reidy 0-5, D Breen 1-0, J Kelleher 0-2, M Reidy 0-1, P O'Donoghue 0-1, P Ryan 0-1, T Ryan 0-1, J Lenihan 0-1.

11 April 2015 Round 1	Pallasgreen	2-14 - 0-18	Garryspillane	Bruff Grounds
	C Ryan 0-8, O Roche 2-0, R O'Donnell 0-2, K Barry 0-2, L O'Dea 0-2.		Donie Ryan 0-13, M O'Donnell 0-2, C Dineen 0-1, D Hayes 0-1, Davy Ryan 0-1.

12 April 2015 Round 1	Knockainey	1-13 - 0-14	Granagh–Ballingarry	FitzGerald Park

30 April 2015 Round 2	Bruree	1-20 - 0-16	Blackrock	FitzGerald Park
	K O'Dea 0-7, B O'Rourke 0-4, M Lane 0-4, James O'Brien 0-3, John O'Brien 1-0, D Deady 0-1, P Lane 0-1.		M Roche 0-4, R Murphy 0-4, R McCarthy 0-3, P Leahy 0-3, R O'Shaughnessy 0-2.

1 May 2015 Round 2	Garryspillane	2-13 - 1-05	Granagh–Ballingarry	Michael Fox Park
	C Hickey 2-2, Donie Ryan 0-6, C Dineen 0-2, D Hayes 0-2, C Shanahan 0-1.		D O'Connor 0-3, K O'Connor 1-0, E Kennedy 0-1, C O'Keeffe 0-1.

1 May 2015 Round 2	Pallasgreen	2-08 - 1-12	Knockainey	Kilbreedy Grounds
	C Ryan 0-4, D Fanning 1-0, O Roche 1-0, K Barry 0-2, R O'Donnell 0-2.		L O'Shea 0-7, S Lonergan 1-0, D Walsh 0-2, J Lonergan 0-1, P Barron 0-1, K Cleary 0-1.

2 May 2015 Round 2	Monaleen	2-15 - 0-17	Dromin/Athlacca	Michael Fox Park
	A La Touche Cosgrave 1-7, S Mullane 1-1, P Russell 0-2, E Doyle 0-2, J Nicholas 0-1, L Lyons 0-1, G Collins 0-1.		P Neenan 0-11, D Reidy 0-3, T Ryan 0-1, J Lenihan 0-1, E O'Leary 0-1.

28 May 2015 Round 3	Knockainey	1-16 - 1-11	Garryspillane	FitzGerald Park
	D Walsh 0-5, M Cleary 1-0, D Madden 0-3, L O'Shea 0-3, P Kirby 0-3, K Cleary 0-2.		Donie Ryan 0-6, C Hickey 1-0, James Ryan 0-1, D Hayes 0-1, M Burke 0-1, J Kerins 0-1, C Ryan 0-1.

28 May 2015 Round 3	Monaleen	4-17 - 3-10	Blackrock	St John's Park
	A La Touche Cosgrave 1-7, J Nicholas 2-1, L Lyons 1-1, B Geary 0-2, G Collins 0-2, P Russell 0-2, S Mullane 0-2.		D Dawson 2-4, R O'Shaughnessy 1-0, R McCarthy 0-3, K Palmer 0-1, S Hennessy 0-1, P Leahy 0-1.

30 May 2015 Round 3	Pallasgreen	0-10 - 0-13	Granagh–Ballingarry	FitzGerald Park
	C Ryan 0-8, L O'Dwyer 0-1, K Barry 0-1.		D O'Connor 0-8, M Clancy 0-2, D O'Grady 0-1, P Condron 0-1, E Kennedy 0-1.

30 May 2015 Round 3	Bruree	3-08 - 2-11	Dromin/Athlacca	FitzGerald Park
	K O'Dea 2-4, John O'Brien 1-0, James V O'Brien 0-3, P Lane 0-1.		J Lenihan 1-1, P Neenan 0-4, M Lane 1-0, J Kelleher 0-3, D Reidy 0-2, P O'Donoghue 0-1.

25 June 2015 Round 4	Bruree	1-16 - 0-19	Pallasgreen	Childers Road
	K O'Dea 0-9, J O'Brien 1-1, M Lane 0-4, James V O'Brien 0-2.		C Ryan 0-14, K Barry 0-4, C McMahon 0-2.

25 June 2015 Round 4	Blackrock	1-15 - 3-09	Knockainey	Kilbreedy Grounds
	D Dawson 0-6, R McCarthy 0-4, D Moloney 1-0, R O'Shaughnessy 0-2, K Palmer 0-2, B Moloney 0-1.		L O'Shea 1-3, M Cleary 1-2, N Finch 1-0, D Walsh 0-2, D Madden 0-1, P Kirby 0-1.

26 June 2015 Round 4	Dromin/Athlacca	1-14 - 0-20	Garryspillane	Michael Fox Park
	D Reidy 1-8, J Lenihan 0-3, P Ryan 0-3.		Donie Ryan 0-13, C Ryan 0-3, C Dineen 0-2, M Burke 0-1, J Ryan 0-1.

26 June 2015 Round 4	Monaleen	0-14 - 0-17	Granagh–Ballingarry	Bruff Grounds
	A La Touche Cosgrave 0-8, L Lyons 0-1, B Geary 0-1, E Doyle 0-1, P Russell 0-1, S Mullane 0-1, E O'Connell 0-1.		D O'Connor 0-7, D O'Grady 0-5, B Hanley 0-2, D Condron 0-1, K O'Connor 0-1, M Clancy 0-1.

31 July 2015 Round 5	Monaleen	0-16 - 0-15	Pallasgreen	Fr Hayes Memorial Park
	A La Touche Cosgrave 0-7, M O'Dwyer 0-2, E Doyle 0-2, L Lyons 0-2, P Russell 0-1, K Gleeson 0-1, A Nicholas 0-1.		C Ryan 0-9, B Fanning 0-2, L O'Dwyer 0-1, K Barry 0-1, C McMahon 0-1, P Roche 0-1.

1 August 2015 Round 5	Dromin/Athlacca	0-14 - 1-14	Knockainey	Bruff Grounds
	D Reidy 0-8, E O'Leay 0-3, T Ryan 0-2, P Neenan 0-1.		L O'Shea 1-7, J Lonergan 0-2, P Kirby 0-1, D Walsh 0-1, S Lonergan 0-1, D Madden 0-1, K Cleary 0-1.

1 August 2015 Round 5	Bruree	0-14 - 1-17	Garryspillane	FitzGerald Park
	K O'Dea 0-9, M Lane 0-3, S Mullane 0-1, B O'Rourke 0-1.		Donie Ryann 0-11, C Hickey 1-1, C Ryan 0-3, K Hickey 0-2.

8 August 2015 Round 5	Blackrock	3-16 - 2-17	Granagh–Ballingarry	FitzGerald Park
	R O'Shaughnessy 2-3, R McCarthy 1-4, M Farrell 0-6, K Palmer 0-2, D Moloney 0-1.

28 August 2015 Round 6	Pallasgreen	2-14 - 2-16	Blackrock	St John's Park
	C Ryan 0-9, K Barry 1-2, O Roche 1-1, J Deere 0-1, D Hannon 0-1.		M Farrell 0-8, K Palmer 1-1, R O'Shaughnessy 1-0, P Leahy 0-2, E O'Keeffe 0-1, B Hennessy 0-1, R McCarthy 0-1, B O'Shaughnessy 0-1, B Moloney 0-1.

29 August 2015 Round 6	Monaleen	0-17 - 1-13	Garryspillane	Bruff Grounds
	A La Touche Cosgrave 0-9, P Russell 0-3, S Griffin 0-2, G Collins 0-1, L Lyons 0-1, L Murphy 0-1.		Donie Ryan 1-6, C Ryan 0-5, C Shanahan 0-1, M Sheehan 0-1.

30 August 2015 Round 6	Dromin/Athlacca	1-13 - 0-20	Granagh–Ballingarry	FitzGerald Park
	P Neenan 0-7, D Breen 1-0, J Lenihan 0-2, D Reidy 0-1, P Ryan 0-1, D Mullins 0-1, M Reidy 0-1.		C O'Keeffe 0-8, D O'Connor 0-6, D O'Grady 0-4, M Clancy 0-1, N Kennedy 0-1.

30 August 2015 Round 6	Bruree	2-09 - 1-09	Knockainey	Michael Fox Park
	D Deady 2-1, K O'Dea 0-5, B O'Rourke 0-1, James O'Brien 0-1, M Lane 0-1.		D Walsh 1-2, L O'Shea 0-5, J Lonergan 0-1, M Cleary 0-1.

20 September 2015 Round 7	Monaleen	0-16 - 3-16	Knockainey	Fr Hayes Memorial Park
	A La Touche Cosgrave 0-9, J Nicholas 0-2, D Golden 0-1, E Doyle 0-1, G Collins 0-1, P Russell 0-1, S Mullane 0-1.		L O'Shea 1-9, J Lonergan 2-1, D Madden 0-2, D Walsh 0-1, P Kirby 0-1, M Cleary 0-1, P Barron 0-1.

20 September 2015 Round 7	Pallasgreen	1-09 - 6-07	Dromin/Athlacca

20 September 2015 Round 7	Garryspillane	1-21 - 3-14	Blackrock	Kilbreedy Grounds
	Donie Ryan 0-8, J Ryan 0-4, C Ryan 1-1, D Hayes 0-3, K Hickey 0-3, C Dineen 0-1.		M Farrell 0-7, P Leahy 1-2, K Palmer 1-1, R O'Shaughnessy 1-1, E O'Keeffe 0-1, B Moloney 0-1, R McCarthy 0-1.

20 September 2015 Round 7	Bruree	2-14 - 0-08	Granagh–Ballingarry	FitzGerald Park
	K O'Dea 1-5, G O'Dea 1-0, S Mullane 0-3, B O'Rourke 0-2, J O'Brien 0-2, J O'Dea 0-1, James V O'Brien 0-1.		C O'Keeffe 0-2, D O'Grady 0-2, S Lenihan 0-1, M Clancy 0-1, P Carroll 0-1, E Kennedy 0-1.

== Knockout stage ==
=== Semi-finals ===
3 October 2015 Semi-final	Knockainey	1-13 - 0-09	Garryspillane	FitzGerald Park
	L O'Shea 0-4, J Lonergan 1-0, P Kirby 0-2, P Barron 0-2, K Cleary 0-1, M Cleary 0-1, B O'Shea 0-1, D Walsh 0-1, S Lonergan 0-1.		Donie Ryan 0-4, C Ryan 0-1, K Hickey 0-1, C Hickey 0-1, G Power 0-1, M O'Donnell 0-1.

10 October 2015 Semi-final	Monaleen	1-16 - 1-16	Bruree	FitzGerald Park
	A La Touche Cosgrave 1-11, L Lyons 0-2, P Russell 0-1, E Doyle 0-1, J Nicholas 0-1.		K O'Dea 1-5, S Mullane 0-3, B O'Rourke 0-2, J O'Brien 0-2, P Deady 0-1, G O'Brien 0-1, D Deady 0-1, M Lane 0-1.

17 October 2015 Semi-final replay	Monaleen	1-11 - 1-12	Bruree	FitzGerald Park
	A La Touche Cosgrave 0-6, M O'Dwyer 1-0, P Russell 0-2, S Mullane 0-1, D Golden 0-1.		K O'Dea 0-7, J O'Brien 1-1, JV O'Brien 0-3, M Lane 0-1.

=== Final ===
24 October 2015 Final	Bruree	3-07 - 0-13	Knockainey	FitzGerald Park
	D Deady 1-0, M Lane 1-0, J O'Brien 1-0, K O'Dea 0-3, JV O'Brien 0-2, J O'Dea 0-1, S Mullane 0-1.		L O'Shea 0-4, P Barron 0-3, D Walsh 0-3, P Kirby 0-2, K Cleary 0-1.
