= 2017 Limerick Premier Intermediate Hurling Championship =

- Dates: 7 April – 18 October 2017
- Teams: 8
- Sponsor: LIT
- Champions: Murroe–Boher (1st title); William Tobin (captain); Ger Bradley (manager)
- Runners-up: Garryspillane; Davy Ryan (captain); Darren Hayes (manager)
- Relegated: Effin

The 2017 Limerick Premier Intermediate Hurling Championship was the fourth staging of the Limerick Premier Intermediate Hurling Championship since its establishment by the Limerick County Board in 2014. The championship ran from 7 April to 18 October 2017.

The final, a replay, was played on 18 October 2017 at the Gaelic Grounds in Limerick, between Murroe–Boher and Garryspillane, in what was their first ever meeting in the final. Murroe–Boher won the match by 1–21 to 1–15 to claim their first ever championship title in the grade.

== Team changes ==
=== To Championship ===
Relegated from the Limerick Senior Hurling Championship

- Bruree
- Murroe–Boher

Promoted from the Limerick Intermediate Hurling Championship

- Mungret/St Paul's
- Pallasgreen

=== From Championship ===
Promoted to the Limerick Senior Hurling Championship

- Cappamore
- Monaleen

Relegated to the Limerick Intermediate Hurling Championship

- Croom
- Granagh–Ballingarry

== Group stage ==
=== Group stage table ===
Knockout stage Relegation stage

Team	Matches				Pts
Team	Pld	W	D	L	Pts
Murroe–Boher	7	6	0	1	12
Garryspillane	7	5	0	2	10
Pallasgreen	7	3	2	2	8
Feohanagh	7	4	0	3	8
Bruree	7	4	0	3	8
Blackrock	7	2	1	4	5
Mungret/St Paul's	7	2	0	5	4
Effin (R)	7	1	0	6	2

== Relegation stage ==
=== Playoff ===
1 October 2017 Playoff	Mungret/St Paul's	2-13 - 1-08	Effin	Bruff Grounds
	P O'Brien 1-7, B Giltennane 1-0, B Tobin 0-3, N Mulcahy 0-2, R Burke 0-1.		T Quaid 1-5, C Doherty 0-3.

== Knockout stage ==
=== Semi-finals ===
24 September 2017 Semi-final	Garryspillane	3-11 - 2-09	Feohanagh	FitzGerald Park
	E Sheehan 2-0, Donie Ryan 0-5, M O'Donnell 1-0, D Hayes 0-3, C Ryan 0-2, J Morrissey 0-1.		Séamus Flanagan 2-2, M Fitzgibbon 0-2, B Lynch 0-2, J Butler 0-2, Seán Flanagan 0-1.

24 September 2017 Semi-final	Murroe–Boher	0-15 - 0-12	Pallasgreen	Fr Hayes Memorial Park
	S Tobin 0-8, J Casey 0-2, P Tobin 0-2, S Hickey 0-1, C Byrnes 0-1, D O'Connor 0-1.		C Ryan 0-7, J Deere 0-3, C Roche 0-1, T Franklin 0-1.

=== Finals ===
15 October 2017 Final	Murroe–Boher	0-21 - 3-12	Garryspillane	Gaelic Grounds
	S Tobin 0-13, A Kennedy 0-2, C Byrnes 0-2, C Byrnes 0-1, D O'Connor 0-1, J Casey 0-1, S Hickey 0-1.		Donie Ryan 1-7, C Ryan 2-2, J Kerins 0-1, M O'Donnell 0-1, E Sheehan 0-1.

=== Final replay ===
18 October 2017 Final replay	Murroe–Boher	1-21 - 1-15	Garryspillane	Gaelic Grounds
	S Tobin 1-10 (0-8f), P Tobin 0-8, D Sheehan 0-2 (1lineball), M Hanley 0-1.		Donie Ryan 1-9 (0-8f), M O’Donnell and C Ryan 0-2 each, J Ryan and D Hayes 0-1 each.
