= 2019 Limerick Premier Intermediate Hurling Championship =

- Dates: 12 April – 26 October 2019
- Teams: 8
- Sponsor: Lyons of Limerick
- Champions: Blackrock (1st title); Paudie Leahy (captain); Jimmy Quilty (manager)
- Runners-up: Kildimo–Pallaskenry; Chris Sexton (manager)
- Relegated: Pallasgreen

The 2019 Limerick Premier Intermediate Hurling Championship was the sixth staging of the Limerick Premier Intermediate Hurling Championship since its establishment by the Limerick County Board in 2014. The championship ran from 12 April to 26 October 2019

The final, a replay, was played on 26 October 2019 at the LIT Gaelic Grounds in Limerick, between Blackrock and Kildimo–Pallaskenry, in what was their first ever meeting in the final. Blackrock won the match by 1–18 to 0–16 to claim their first ever championship title in the grade.

== Knockout stage ==
=== Semi-finals ===
21 September 2019 Semi-final	Blackrock	3-18 - 2-12	Mungret/St Paul's	FitzGerald Park
	P Leahy 0-10, R O'Shaughnessy 1-3, K Palmer 1-1, A Cooke 1-0, D Dawson 0-3, M Farrell 0-1.		R Bourke 2-1, P O'Brien 0-7, N Mulcahy 0-2, C O'Brien 0-1, E O'Doherty 0-1.

21 September 2019 Semi-final	Kildimo–Pallaskenry	2-10 - 2-09	Bruff	FitzGerald Park
	A Butler 0-11, S Barry 1-4, D Corrigan 1-1, J Chawke 0-2, J O'Keeffe 0-1, K Hayes 0-1.		D O'Leary 1-2, K Dillon 0-3, J Cooke 1-0, S Bulfin 0-1, C Browne 0-1, I Gardiner 0-1, P Browne 0-1.

=== Final ===
6 October 2019 Final	Blackrock	0–18 – 0–18	Kildimo–Pallaskenry	Gaelic Grounds
	P Leahy 0-11, R O'Shaughnessy 0-2, D Heffernan 0-2, D Moloney 0-1, A Cooke 0-1, K Palmer 0-1.	Report	S Barry 0-11, D O'Connell 0-4, J Chawke 0-1, C Hayes 0-1, A Butler 0-1.

=== Final replay ===
26 October 2019 Final replay	Blackrock	1–18 – 0–16	Kildimo–Pallaskenry	Gaelic Grounds
	P Leahy 0–8 (7f); C O’Keeffe 1–0; K Palmer 0–3, R O’Shaughnessy, D Moloney 0–2 each, D Dawson, A Cooke, G O’Loughlin 0–1 each.		S Barry 0–8 (1 ’65, 6 f); K Hayes 0–3; A Butler 0–2 (1f); D O’Connell, L Griffin, J Chawke (f) 0–1 each.
