= Séamus Hickey =

Irish hurler

Personal information
- Native name: Séamus Ó hÍcí (Irish)
- Born: 2 October 1987 (age 39) Boher, County Limerick, Ireland
- Occupation: Program Manager
- Height: 1.85 m (6 ft 1 in)

Sport
- Sport: Hurling
- Position: Left corner-back
Clubs
- Years: Club
- Murroe-Boher 2005-2019; Croagh-Kilfinny 2020-present
Club titles
- Limerick titles: 0
College
- Years: College
- 2006-2011: University of Limerick
College titles
- Fitzgibbon titles: 1
Inter-county*
Years	County	Apps (scores)
2006-2018	Limerick	44 (0-08)
Inter-county titles
- Munster titles: 1
- All-Irelands: 1
- NHL: 0
- All Stars: 1
- *Inter County team apps and scores correct as of 01:48, 20 August 2018.

Séamus Hickey (born 2 October 1987) is an Irish sportsperson. He played hurling with his local club Murroe-Boher from 2005 to 2019 and is now a member of the Croagh-Kilfinny club. Hickey was a member at inter-county level of the Limerick senior team from 2006 until 2018.

== Playing career ==
=== College ===
Hickey first came to prominence as a hurler with St. Flannan's College in Ennis, County Clare. Having played in every grade as a hurler and Gaelic footballer, he was a left wing-back and centre-back on the college's senior hurling teams that won back-to-back Harty Cup titles in 2004 and 2005. On 2 May 2005, Hickey won an All-Ireland medal after a 2–15 to 2–12 defeat of St. Kieran's College from Kilkenny in the final at Semple Stadium.

=== University ===
During his studies at the University of Limerick, Hickey immediately became involved with the university's hurling team stating: "My induction day as a fresher, they were going looking at lecture halls and timetables. I went straight for the GAA office and asked when the Fitzgibbon trials were on! I saw it as an extension of school hurling and representing where you go. For me, I thought it was natural while developing as a hurler." After losing the 2009 Fitzgibbon Cup final at left wing-back to University College Cork in 2009, Hickey was moved to the full-back line with Michael "Brick" Walsh and Paddy Stapleton for UL's 1–17 to 2–11 defeat of the Limerick Institute of Technology in the final on 26 February 2011.

=== Club ===
Hickey joined the Murroe-Boher club at a young age and played in all grades at juvenile and underage levels. He played for the club's Junior B team for the first time at the age of fifteen, before becoming centre-back the following year. Hickey made his first senior appearance at the age of seventeen, marking Brian Geary in a championship game against Monaleen.

Hickey also played Gaelic football with the Monaleen senior team. On 16 October 2011, he won a Limerick Football Championship medal after coming on as a substitute in Monaleen's 1–12 to 1–07 defeat of Newcastle West in the final.

On 18 October 2017, Hickey won a Limerick Premier Intermediate Hurling Championship medal following a 1–21 to 1–15 defeat of Garryspillane in a replay of the final.

On 15 January 2020, it was announced that Hickey had transferred from his native Murroe-Boher to Croagh-Kilfinny.

In June 2021, Hickey added a County Junior medal to his silverware. He lined out at centre back for his new club Croagh-Kilfinny, as they defeated Patrickswell in the Covid-delayed 2020 Junior A County Hurling Final.

=== Inter-county ===
==== Minor and under-21 ====
Hickey first played for Limerick at minor level during the team's unsuccessful 2004 championship. He was eligible for the grade again the following year and, after being defeated by Cork in the Munster final, Limerick qualified for the All-Ireland final on 11 September 2005. Hickey scored two points from midfield in the 3–12 to 0–17 defeat by Galway.

On 7 June 2006, Hickey made his first appearance for the Limerick under-21 hurling team in an 0–11 to 0–10 defeat by Waterford in the Munster Championship. It was the first of three unsuccessful seasons with the team.

==== Senior ====
On 26 March 2006, Hickey made his senior debut for Limerick when he came on as a substitute for Mark O'Riordan in a National League defeat of Laois at O'Moore Park. He later came on as a 62nd-minute substitute in Limerick's league final defeat by Kilkenny. Hickey made his first championship appearance on 14 May 2006 in a 0–22 to 2–12 defeat by Tipperary in the Munster Championship.

Hickey played in his first Munster final on 8 July 2007 in a 3–17 to 1–14 defeat by Waterford. After a subsequent All-Ireland semi-final defeat of Waterford, Hickey lined out in his first All-Ireland final on 2 September 2007. Hickey had a torrid afternoon marking man of the match Eddie Brennan who scored 1-05 from play in Kilkenny's 2–19 to 1–15 victory. Hickey later remarked: "I wouldn’t go OTT on it but I was a boy that day, I really was, playing with real men." He ended the season by being nominated for an All-Star Award and by being named Vodafone Young Hurler of the Year.

After two disappointing seasons, Limerick manager Justin McCarthy dropped several high-profile players from the panel in October 2009. Over the course of the winter, many more players, including Hickey, withdrew from the panel and refused to play while McCarthy and his management team remained in place. The Limerick County Board refused to remove McCarthy and contested the league and championship with a new group of players. Hickey, who spent much of the championship season in Boston, admitted: "It was a difficult decision. My ambition since I was knee high was to wear the green and white. But I stood up for something I believed in. I had stood shoulder to shoulder with many of the great men to wear Limerick jerseys over the last 10 years and I felt the treatment we were getting and the deal we were dealt wasn’t fair."

Hickey made his return to the Limerick team on 13 February 2011 in a National League defeat of Clare. On 30 April 2011, he won a National League Division 2 medal after a 4–12 to 2–13 defeat of Clare in the final.

On 14 July 2013, Hickey scored a point from left wing-forward in Limerick's 0–24 to 0–15 defeat of Cork in the Munster final. In the subsequent All-Ireland semi-final against Clare, he was forced off injured after just 14 minutes with a knee injury. Damage to his cruciate ligament was later diagnosed. Hickey returned to the Limerick team in May 2014.

On 10 August 2014, Hickey was named man of the match in Limerick's 2–13 to 0–17 defeat by Kilkenny in the All-Ireland semi-final. He ended the season by being named in the left corner-back position on the All-Star team.

On 19 August 2018, Hickey was a non-playing substitute when Limerick won their first All-Ireland title in 45 years after a 3–16 to 2–18 defeat of Galway in the final.

On 4 December 2018, Hickey announced his retirement from inter-county hurling.

=== Inter-provincial ===
Hickey made his first appearance for the Munster team in a 2–17 to 1–16 defeat by Connacht on 15 October 2006.

On 27 October 2007, Hickey won a Railway Cup medal following Munster's 2–22 to 2–19 defeat of Connacht in the final at Croke Park.

== Career statistics ==
Hickey working as Program Manager at Ei Electronics, Shannon since February 2025.He was working at Johnson & Johnson as Project Manager for innovation-focused Sensors and IoT Laboratory for 5 years before joining EI. Previously he was Research Projects Coordinator, also with J&J. In 2018 Seamus was awarded a PhD at the Stokes Institute at University of Limerick. He has a First-Class Honours Bachelor of Engineering in Biomedical Engineering from U.L.

=== Inter-county ===
Team	Year	National League			Munster		All-Ireland		Total	
Team	Year	Division	Apps	Score	Apps	Score	Apps	Score	Apps	Score
Limerick	2006	Division 1B	3	0-00	1	0-00	4	0-00	8	0-00
Limerick	2007	Division 1B	4	0-00	4	0-00	3	0-00	11	0-00
Limerick	2008	Division 1B	5	0-00	1	0-00	1	0-00	7	0-00
Limerick	2009	Division 1	7	0-03	2	0-03	4	0-03	13	0-09
Limerick	2010	Division 1	—		—		—		—	
Limerick	2011	Division 2	7	0-02	1	0-00	3	0-00	11	0-02
Limerick	2012	Division 1B	0	0-00	0	0-00	3	0-00	3	0-00
Limerick	2013	Division 1B	5	0-09	2	0-01	1	0-00	8	0-10
Limerick	2014	Division 1B	0	0-00	2	0-01	2	0-00	4	0-01
Limerick	2015	Division 1B	5	0-01	2	0-00	1	0-00	8	0-01
Limerick	2016	Division 1B	5	0-01	1	0-00	1	0-00	7	0-01
Limerick	2017	Division 1B	7	0-02	1	0-00	1	0-00	9	0-02
Limerick	2018	Division 1B	5	0-00	1	0-00	2	0-00	8	0-00
Total			53	0-18	18	0-05	26	0-03	97	0-26

=== Inter-provincial ===
Team	Year	Railway Cup	
Team	Year	Apps	Score
Munster	2006	1	0-00
Munster	2007	1	0-00
Munster	2008	2	0-00
Munster	2009	1	0-00
Total		5	0-00

== Honours ==
St. Flannan's College

- Dr. Croke Cup (1): 2005
- Dr. Harty Cup (2): 2004, 2005

University of Limerick

- Fitzgibbon Cup (1): 2011

Croagh-Kilfinny

- Limerick Junior Hurling Championship (1): 2020

Murroe-Boher

- Limerick Premier Intermediate Hurling Championship (1): 2017

Monaleen

- Limerick Senior Football Championship (1): 2011

Limerick

- All-Ireland Senior Hurling Championship (1): 2018
- Munster Senior Hurling Championship (1): 2013
- National Hurling League Division 2 (1): 2011
- Munster Senior Hurling League (1): 2018
- Waterford Crystal Cup (2): 2006, 2015

Munster

- Railway Cup (1): 2007

Individual

- All Stars Young Hurler of the Year (1): 2007
- GAA GPA All Stars Awards (1): 2014

Sporting positions
Preceded by Donal Óg Cusack	Chairman of the Gaelic Players' Association; 2015-present	Succeeded by Incumbent
Awards
Preceded by James 'Cha' Fitzpatrick)	Vodafone Young Hurler of the Year; 2007	Succeeded by Joe Canning
