= 2018 Limerick Premier Intermediate Hurling Championship =

- Dates: 21 April – 20 October 2018
- Teams: 8
- Sponsor: LIT
- Champions: Garryspillane (1st title); David Ryan (captain); T. J. Ryan (manager)
- Runners-up: Bruff; Bobby O'Brien (captain); Dan Moloney (manager)
- Relegated: Feohanagh

The 2018 Limerick Premier Intermediate Hurling Championship was the fifth staging of the Limerick Premier Intermediate Hurling Championship since its establishment by the Limerick County Board in 2014. The championship ran from 21 April to 20 October 2018.

The final was played on 18 October 2018 at FitzGerald Park in Kilmallock, between Garryspillane and Bruff, in what was their first ever meeting in the final. Garryspillane won the match by 2–12 to 0–12 to claim their first ever championship title in the grade.

== Group stage ==
=== Group stage table ===
Knockout stage Relegation stage

Team	Matches				Pts
Team	Pld	W	D	L	Pts
Mungret/St Paul's	7	5	1	1	11
Kildimo–Pallaskenry	7	5	1	1	11
Garryspillane	7	4	2	1	10
Bruff	7	4	1	2	9
Pallasgreen	7	1	3	3	5
Bruree	7	1	2	4	4
Feohanagh (R)	7	1	1	5	3
Blackrock	7	1	1	5	3

== Relegation stage ==
=== Playoff ===
13 October 2018 Playoff	Blackrock	0-15 - 0-11	Feohanagh	Bruff Grounds
	P Leahy 0-13, D Brazill 0-1, D Moloney 0-1.		A Roche 0-4, S Flanagan 0-3, J Kenny 0-2, JF Reidy 0-1, M Fitzgibbon 0-1.

== Knockout stage ==
=== Semi-finals ===
13 October 2013 Semi-final	Mungret/St Paul's	0-19 - 1-17	Bruff	FitzGerald Park
	P O'Brien 0-10, N Mulcahy 0-3, P Begley 0-2, C O'Brien 0-1, B Giltenane 0-1, D Browne 0-1.		S Bulfin 0-7, K Dillon 1-3, C Browne 0-2, J Hayes 0-2, P O'Riordan 0-1, C Madden 0-1, B O'Brien 0-1.

13 October 2013 Semi-final	Garryspillane	1-14 - 0-13	Kildimo–Pallaskenry	FitzGerald Park
	Donie Ryan 0-8, D O'Shea 1-2, C Ryan 0-2, R Tobin 0-1, M O'Donnell 0-1.		J Chawke 0-4, C Staff 0-2, A Butler 0-2, B O'Connell 0-2, J O'Keeffe 0-2, K Hayes 0-1.

=== Final ===
20 October 2018 Final	Garryspillane	2–12 – 0–12	Bruff	FitzGerald Park
	Donie Ryan (0–8, 0–6 frees), C Sheehan (2–1), C Ryan (0–2), M Bourke (0–1).		S Bulfin (0–6 frees), T Burke (0–2), S Finn, J O’Riordan (free), C Browne and J Bulfin (0–1 each).
