= Limerick Premier Intermediate Hurling Championship =

- Current season or competition: 2026 Limerick Premier Intermediate Hurling Championship
- Code: Hurling
- Founded: 2014; 12 years ago
- Region: Limerick (GAA)
- Trophy: Michael Fox Memorial Cup
- No. of teams: 8
- Title holders: Dromin/Athlacca (2nd title)
- First winner: Bruff
- Most titles: Monaleen, Garryspillane, Dromin/Athlacca (2 titles)
- Sponsors: Lyons of Limerick
- Official website: Official website

The Limerick Premier Intermediate Hurling Championship (known for sponsorship reasons as the Lyons of Limerick County Premier Intermediate Hurling Championship and abbreviated to the Limerick PIHC) is an annual hurling competition organised by the Limerick County Board of the Gaelic Athletic Association and contested by the top-ranking intermediate clubs in the county of Limerick in Ireland. It is the second tier overall in the entire Limerick hurling championship system.

The Limerick Premier Intermediate Championship was introduced in 2014 following a split in the existing Limerick Intermediate Hurling Championship. It was the fourth adult county championship to come into existence in Limerick.

In its present format, the Limerick Premier Intermediate Championship uses a round-robin format with each team playing 7 matches (playing all 7 other teams once). Most games are played on Saturdays and Sundays. The two top-ranking teams proceed to the final match at the LIT Gaelic Grounds. The winner of the Limerick Premier Intermediate Championship, as well as gaining automatic promotion to the Limerick Senior Championship, qualifies for the subsequent Munster Club Championship. In 2020, the intended format was disrupted and slightly amended due to the impact of the COVID-19 pandemic.

The competition has been won by 10 teams, two have won the tournament more than once.

Dromin/Athlacca are the title holders, winning the 2026 final.

== History ==
The Limerick Intermediate Championship was founded in 1910 in an effort to bridge the standard of play between the Limerick Senior Championship and the Limerick Junior Championship. Three separate hurling championships proved difficult to sustain, particularly due to a lack of competitive clubs, and the championship was discontinued and reinstated on a number of occasions before being reinstated permanently in 1988.

At a Special Convention of the Limerick County Board in February 2013 it was decided by 115 votes to 108 to introduce radical new changes for the 2014 championship season. While the structure of the 2013 senior and intermediate hurling championships remained unchanged, the final placings were used to ‘grade’ clubs for the new structures the following season. The changes meant that the 2014 Senior Championship was reduced from 16 to 12 teams, with the four relegated teams forming half of the new eight-team Premier Intermediate Championship for 2014. The remaining four teams for this new tier of championship were the four semi-finalists from the 2013 Intermediate Championship.

The eight teams in the inaugural championship were: Blackrock, Bruff, Bruree, Croom, Dromin-Athlacca, Garryspillane, Hospital-Herbertstown and Knockaderry. The very first match took place on 18 April 2014, with Bruff claiming a 2-19 to 2-13 victory over Bruree in the first round of group games. Bruff went on to win the very first championship after a 2-14 to 0-16 defeat of Croom in the 2014 final.

== Teams ==
=== 2026 teams ===
The 8 teams competing in the 2026 Limerick Premier Intermediate Hurling Championship were:

Team	Location	Division	Colours	Position in 2026	In championship since	Championship titles	Last championship title
Blackrock	Kilfinane	South	Green and white	Semi-finals	2023	1	2019
Bruff	Bruff	South	Red and white	Runners-up	2018	1	2014
Croagh-Kilfinny	Croagh	West	Blue and white		2025	0	—
Dromin/Athlacca	Athlacca	South	Blue and white	Champion	2026	2	2026
Effin	Effin	South	Green and white		2022	0	—
Glenroe	Ballyhoura Mountains	South	Green and black		2020	0	—
Granagh-Ballingarry	Ballingarry	West	Green and black		2024	0	—
Murroe / Boher	Murroe	East	Blue and green	Semi-finals	2026	0	—

== Qualification for subsequent competitions ==
The Limerick Premier Intermediate Hurling Championship winners qualify for the subsequent Munster Intermediate Club Hurling Championship.

== List of finals ==
=== List of Limerick PIHC finals ===
Year	Winners		Runners-up		Venue	#
Year	Club	Score	Club	Score	Venue	#
2026	Dromin/Athlacca	2-18	Bruff	3-11	TUS Gaelic Grounds	
2025	Garryspillane	4-19 (3 penalties)	Effin	2-25 (0 penalties)	TUS Gaelic Grounds	
2024	Newcastle West	2-12	Garryspillane	1-11	TUS Gaelic Grounds	
2023	Dromin/Athlacca	2-20	Blackrock	3-16	FitzGerald Park	
2022	Monaleen	2-16	Bruff	0-16		
2021	Mungret/St. Paul's	4-17	Cappamore	1-12	TUS Gaelic Grounds	
2020	Kildimo-Pallaskenry	0-22	Mungret/St. Paul's	1-13	LIT Gaelic Grounds	
2019	Blackrock	1-18	Kildimo-Pallaskenry	0-16	LIT Gaelic Grounds	
2018	Garryspillane	2-12	Bruff	0-12	FitzGerald Park	
2017	Murroe / Boher	1-21	Garryspillane	1-15	Gaelic Grounds	
2016	Monaleen	1-17	Cappamore	2-11	FitzGerald Park	
2015	Bruree	3-07	Knockainey	0-13	FitzGerald Park	
2014	Bruff	2-14	Croom	0-16	FitzGerald Park	

=== Notes ===
- 2019: The first match ended in a draw. Blackrock 0-18 - 0-18 Kildimo-Pallaskenry.

== Roll of honour ==
=== By club ===
#	Club	Titles	Runners-up	Championships won	Championships runner-up
1	Garryspillane	2	2	2018, 2025	2017, 2024
1	Monaleen	2	0	2016, 2022	—
1	Dromin/Athlacca	2	0	2023, 2026	—
4	Bruff	1	3	2014	2018, 2022, 2026
4	Blackrock	1	1	2019	2023
4	Kildimo-Pallaskenry	1	1	2020	2019
4	Mungret/St. Paul's	1	1	2021	2020
4	Bruree	1	0	2015	—
4	Murroe / Boher	1	0	2017	—
4	Newcastle West	1	0	2024	—
11	Cappamore	0	2	—	2016, 2021
11	Croom	0	1	—	2014
11	Knockainey	0	1	—	2015
11	Effin	0	1	—	2025

== See also ==
- Limerick Senior Hurling Championship (Tier 1)
- Limerick Intermediate Hurling Championship (Tier 3)
- Limerick Premier Junior A Hurling Championship (Tier 4)
- Limerick Junior A Hurling Championship (Tier 5)
