= Seánie Tobin =

Irish hurler

Personal information
- Native name: Seánie Ó Tóibín (Irish)
- Nickname: Seánie
- Born: 18 December 1989 (age 36) Limerick, Ireland
- Occupation: Primary school teacher
- Height: 5 ft 11 in (180 cm)

Sport
- Sport: Hurling
- Position: Right wing-forward
Club
- Years: Club
- 2007–2021: Murroe-Boher
Club titles
- Limerick titles: 0
College
- Years: College
- 2007-2011: Limerick Institute of Technology
College titles
- Fitzgibbon titles: 0
Inter-county*
Years	County	Apps (scores)
2011–2016	Limerick	19 (3-28)
Inter-county titles
- Munster titles: 1
- All-Irelands: 0
- NHL: 0
- All Stars: 0
- *Inter County team apps and scores correct as of 21:37, 9 June 2021.

Seán Tobin (born 18 December 1989) is an Irish hurling coach and former player. In a career that spanned three decades he lined out at club level with Murroe-Boher and at inter-county level with the Limerick senior hurling team.

== Career ==
=== Murroe-Boher ===
After coming to hurling prominence as a student at CBS Sexton Street, Tobin later lined out in the Fitzgibbon Cup with the Limerick Institute of Technology while simultaneously joining Murroe-Boher's top adult club team. In 2017, he won a Premier Intermediate Championship title after top-scoring with 1–10 in a 1–21 to 1-15 replay defeat of Garryspillane. On 9 June 2021, Tobin announced his retirement from the club game at the age of 31 because of injury.

=== Limerick ===
Tobin first played for Limerick as a member of the minor team on 24 June 2007. He was held scoreless in a 0–12 to 3–21 Munster semi-final defeat by Tipperary. Over the following three years he was a regular with the Limerick under-21 team, however, his side enjoyed little success during that period.

Tobin made his senior debut for Limerick in a 2–09 to 0–06 league defeat of Clare on 13 February 2011. He became a regular throughout the group stage games and ended the campaign with a Division 2 winners' medal following a 4–12 to 2–13 defeat of Clare in the final. Tobin contributed 1-01 during that game.

On 12 June 2011, Tobin made his senior championship debut in a 3–15 to 3–14 Munster semi-final defeat by Waterford.

In 2013, Tobin won a Munster Championship medal following a 0–24 to 0–15 victory over Cork.

In March 2016, Tobin left the Limerick senior team citing a lack of game time under manager T. J. Ryan as his primary reason.

== Career statistics ==
Team	Year	National League			Munster		All-Ireland		Total	
Team	Year	Division	Apps	Score	Apps	Score	Apps	Score	Apps	Score
Limerick	2011	Division 2	7	5-10	1	0-00	3	0-04	11	5-14
Limerick	2012	Division 1B	4	2-04	1	0-03	4	2-05	9	4-12
Limerick	2013	Division 1B	4	1-01	2	1-03	1	0-00	7	2-04
Limerick	2014	Division 1B	5	1-03	2	0-00	2	0-04	9	1-07
Limerick	2015	Division 1B	5	0-22	1	0-00	2	0-09	8	0-31
Limerick	2016	Division 1B	3	0-02	0	0-00	0	0-00	3	0-02
Total			28	9-42	7	1-06	12	2-22	47	12-70

== Honours ==
Murroe-Boher

- Limerick Premier Intermediate Hurling Championship: 2017

Limerick

- Munster Senior Hurling Championship: 2013
- National Hurling League Division 2: 2011
