= Murroe / Boher GAA =

Gaelic games club in County Limerick, Ireland

Murroe / Boher
- Maigh Rua / Bóthar
- Founded: 1887
- County: Limerick
- Colours: Blue and Green
- Grounds: Harty Park, Murroe and Boher GAA Pitch, Boher

Playing kits
Standard colours

Senior Club Championships
	All Ireland	Munster champions	Limerick champions
Hurling:	-	-	1

Murroe / Boher GAA (Irish: Maigh Rua/Bóthar) is a Gaelic Athletic Association club based in County Limerick, Ireland. It is based in the parish of Murroe / Boher in the east division of Limerick GAA.

== History ==
The club was founded in 1887, which makes it one of the oldest clubs in County Limerick.

== Notable hurlers ==
- Séamus Hickey 2007 All Stars Young Hurler of the Year, GAA GPA All Stars Awards winner, Fitzgibbon Cup Team of the Century.
- Joe Quaid Two time All-Star winner, 2018 Christy Ring Cup winning manager.
- Kevin Tobin Three time All-Ireland Under-21 Hurling Championship winner.
- Pat Tobin Two time All-Ireland Under-21 Hurling Championship winner.
- Sean Tobin
- Sean O'Neill
- Owen O'Neill

== Honours ==
- Limerick Senior Hurling Championship : 1887
- Limerick Senior B Hurling Championship : 2003
- Limerick Premier Intermediate Hurling Championship : 2017
- Limerick Intermediate Hurling Championship : 1914, 1999, 2025
- Limerick Junior Hurling Championship : 1917, 1973, 1980, 1987
- Limerick Junior B Hurling Championship : 2016
- Limerick Under-21 "A" Hurling Championship : 1997, 2015, 2022, 2024
- Limerick Minor "A" Hurling Championship : 2014, 2021
- East Limerick Senior Hurling Championship: 1982, 1983, 2005, 2008, 2009, 2010, 2024
