= Dromin/Athlacca GAA =

Gaelic games club in County Limerick, Ireland

Domin/Athlacca
- Dromann/Áth Leacaigh
- County: Limerick
- Colours: Blue and white
- Grounds: Athlacca

Playing kits
Standard colours

Senior Club Championships
	All Ireland	Munster champions	Limerick champions
Football:	0	0	0
Hurling:	0	0	0

Dromin/Athlacca is a Gaelic Athletic Association club located in Athlacca, County Limerick, Ireland. The club fields teams in both hurling and Gaelic football.

== History ==
Hurling in the locality dates back to 1887 when a Dromin team fielded a team in one of the first tournaments organised under GAA rules. The club has enjoyed multiple county championship successes in the 21st century, having claimed four County Intermediate Championship titles.

== Honours ==
- Limerick Premier Intermediate Hurling Championship: 2023, 2026
- Limerick Intermediate Hurling Championship: 1977, 2004, 2007, 2013, 2018
- Limerick Junior Hurling Championship: 1995

== Notable players ==
- David Reidy
