= Glenroe GAA =

- CLG Gleann Rua
- County: Limerick
- Colours: Green and Black
- Coordinates: 52°19′26.49″N 8°24′48.19″W

Playing kits
Standard colours

Glenroe Hurling Club is one of the oldest clubs affiliated to the Gaelic Athletic Association. It plays hurling and formerly gaelic football. It plays in competitions organized by Limerick GAA. Located in the Ballyhoura Mountains, County Limerick, Ireland, local parish teams played hurling games from long before the famine of the 1840s and local teams played before the GAA's foundation.

== History ==
Glenroe became an affiliated club in the 1890s after the foundation of the GAA in 1884. Currently the team plays at intermediate grade. The club is twinned with Ballylanders GAA with whom its members play Gaelic Football.

== Honours ==
=== Hurling ===
County Titles

- Limerick Intermediate Hurling Championship (0): (runner-up in 1975, 1976, 1977, 2005, 2017)
- Limerick Junior Hurling Championship (3): 1974, 1992, 2000
- Limerick Under-21 B Hurling Championship (1): 2004
- Limerick Under-21 12-a-side Hurling Championship (2): 2010, 2012

All-County Hurling Titles

- Limerick Intermediate Div 3 (1): 2007

South Limerick Hurling Titles

- Intermediate Hurling Championship (2): 2008, 2012
- Junior Hurling Championship (6): 1947, 1974, 1987, 1988, 1992, 2000
- Junior B Hurling Championship (1): 1983
- Under-21 B Hurling Championship (1): 2003
- Minor A Hurling Championship (1): 1985

=== Football ===
- Limerick Senior Football Championship (0): (runner-up in 1896)
