= Mungret/St. Paul's GAA =

Gaelic sports club in County Limerick, Ireland

Mungret/St. Paul's
- Mungairit/Naomh Pól
- Founded: 1929
- County: Limerick
- Colours: Red and white
- Grounds: Moneteen

Playing kits
Standard colours

Senior Club Championships
	All Ireland	Munster champions	Limerick champions
Football:	0	0	1
Hurling:	0	0	0

Mungret/St. Paul's GAA is a Gaelic Athletic Association club located in Mungret, County Limerick, Ireland. The club fields teams in both hurling and Gaelic football.

== History ==
The original Mungret club was one of the first clubs formed in Limerick after the establishment of the Gaelic Athletic Association in 1884. The club was very much to the fore in the early days of the GAA but, like many other clubs of the time, the Parnell split took its toll on club membership with the result that the club disbanded. The club was eventually reformed under the Mungret/St. Paul's banner in 1929, by the then headmaster of Mungret national school, Mr. P. J. Larkin, who was instrumental in sparking a Gaelic games revival in the parish.

== Honours ==
- Limerick Senior Football Championship: 2025
- Limerick Premier Intermediate Hurling Championship: 2021
- Limerick Intermediate Hurling Championship: 1975, 2016
- Limerick Intermediate Football Championship: 1997, 2004, 2023
- Limerick Junior A Hurling Championship: 1936, 1940, 1945, 1969, 2006, 2023
- Limerick Junior A Football Championship: 1990, 2003, 2023
- Limerick Under-21 Hurling Championship: 2023
- Limerick Under-21 Football Championship: 2023, 2024
- Limerick Minor Hurling Championship: 1935, 1975, 1993
- Limerick Minor Football Championship: 1986, 2021, 2025

== Notable players ==
- Brian Begley: All-Ireland U21HC-winner (2000)
- Dave Bulfin
- Andy McCallin: All-Ireland U21FC-winner (1969)
- Liam O'Donoghue: All-Ireland SHC-winner (1973)
