= Monaleen GAA =

GAA club in County Limerick

Monaleen
- Móinalín
- Founded: 1957
- County: Limerick
- Colours: Red and white

Playing kits
Standard colours

Senior Club Championships
	All Ireland	Munster champions	Limerick champions
Football:	0	0	6

Monaleen GAA club is a Gaelic Athletic Association club located in Castletroy, County Limerick, Ireland. The club was founded in 1957 and fields teams in both Gaelic football and hurling. The club also participates in camogie competitions.

== Honours ==
Football

- Limerick Senior Football Championship (6): 1978, 2002, 2005, 2010, 2011, 2016
- Limerick Intermediate Football Championship (1): 1976

Hurling

- Limerick Premier Intermediate Hurling Championship (2): 2016, 2022
- Munster Intermediate Club Hurling Championship (1): 2022
- All-Ireland Intermediate Club Hurling Championship (1): 2023
- Limerick Intermediate Hurling Championship (1): 1997

Camogie

- Limerick Junior A Camogie championship (1): 2020

== Notable players ==
- Brian Geary
- Lorcan Lyons
- Donnacha Ó Dálaigh
