= Effin GAA =

Effin
- Eimhín
- Founded: 1887
- County: Limerick
- Colours: Green and white
- Grounds: Effin GAA Grounds

Playing kits
Standard colours

Effin GAA is a Gaelic Athletic Association club in Effin, County Limerick, Ireland. The club is primarily concerned with the game of hurling, but also fields teams in Gaelic football.

== History ==
Located in the village of Effin, County Limerick, Effin GAA Club was founded in 1887. The club has spent most of its existence operating in the lower grades, winning the Limerick JAHC title and 2010. Effin gained a second consecutive promotion after winning the Limerick IHC title in 2011. The Munster Club IHC title was later claimed after a defeat of Ballyduff in the final.

== Honours ==
- Munster Intermediate Club Hurling Championship (1): 2011
- Limerick Intermediate Hurling Championship (2): 2011, 2021
- Limerick Junior A Hurling Championship (1): 2010

== Notable players ==
- Patrick O'Donovan: All-Ireland U20HC runner-up (2022)
- Nickie Quaid: All-Ireland SHC-winner (2018, 2020, 2021, 2022, 2023, 2026)
- Tommy Quaid: Munster SHC-winner (1994, 1996)
- Ned Rea: All-Ireland SHC-winner (1973)
