= 2014 Limerick Premier Intermediate Hurling Championship =

- Dates: 18 April – 25 October 2014
- Teams: 8
- Sponsor: Greenhills Hotel
- Champions: Bruff (1st title); Bobby O'Brien (captain); Gary Kirby (manager)
- Runners-up: Croom; Mickey Cahill (captain); Mike Galligan (manager)
- Relegated: Hospital–Herbertstown; Knockaderry

Tournament statistics
- Matches played: 28
- Goals scored: 72 (2.57 per match)
- Points scored: 736 (26.29 per match)

The 2014 Limerick Premier Intermediate Hurling Championship was the inaugural staging of the Limerick Premier Intermediate Hurling Championship since its establishment by the Limerick County Board. The championship ran from 18 April to 25 October 2014.

The final was played on 25 October 2014 at the Gaelic Grounds in Limerick, between Bruff and Croom, in what was their first ever meeting in the final. Bruff won the match by 2–14 to 0–16 to claim their first ever championship title.

== Group stage ==
=== Group stage table ===
Knockout stage Relegated

Team	Matches				Pts
Team	Pld	W	D	L	Pts
Blackrock	7	5	0	2	10
Bruff	7	5	0	2	10
Garryspillane	7	4	1	2	9
Croom	7	4	0	3	8
Dromin/Athlacca	7	3	1	3	7
Bruree	7	2	2	3	6
Knockaderry	7	2	1	4	5
Hospital–Herbertstown	7	0	1	6	1

=== Group stage results ===
18 April 2014 Round 1	Bruree	2-13 - 2-19	Bruff	FitzGerald Park

19 April 2014 Round 1	Knockaderry	1-12 - 2-12	Croom	Páirc Caoimhín Ó Luing

19 April 2014 Round 1	Dromin/Athlacca	2-18 - 0-15	Garryspillane	Bruff Grounds

3 May 2014 Round 2	Hospital–Herbertstown	0-09 - 1-11	Croom	Michael Fox Park

3 May 2014 Round 2	Blackrock	2-15 - 3-11	Knockaderry	FitzGerald Park

3 May 2014 Round 2	Bruree	1-16 - 1-16	Dromin/Athlacca	Bruff Sportsfield

4 May 2014 Round 2	Bruff	1-13 - 1-13	Garryspillane	FitzGerald Park

9 May 2014 Round 3	Blackrock	1-11 - 0-16	Croom	Bruff Sportsfield

9 May 2014 Round 3	Bruree	0-12 - 1-14	Garryspillane	FitzGerald Park

10 May 2014 Round 3	Knockaderry	2-10 - 0-04	Hospital–Herbertstown	Bruff Sportsfield

11 May 2014 Round 3	Bruff	0-15 - 0-10	Dromin/Athlacca	FitzGerald Park

16 May 2014 Round 1	Blackrock	4-18 - 0-10	Hospital–Herbertstown	Kilbreedy Grounds

13 June 2014 Round 4	Bruree	2-13 - 1-20	Blackrock	FitzGerald Park

14 June 2014 Round 4	Bruff	4-14 - 1-12	Croom	FitzGerald Park

14 June 2014 Round 4	Garryspillane	0-16 - 1-13	Hospital–Herbertstown	FitzGerald Park

15 June 2014 Round 4	Dromin/Athlacca	0-16 - 1-18	Knockaderry	Páirc Caoimhín Ó Luing

15 August 2014 Round 5	Dromin/Athlacca	1-15 - 1-13	Croom	Kilbreedy Grounds

16 August 2014 Round 5	Garryspillane	1-11 - 1-10	Knockaderry	FitzGerald Park

16 August 2014 Round 5	Bruree	3-11 - 1-15	Hospital–Herbertstown	Bruff Sportsfield

19 August 2014 Round 5	Bruff	1-19 - 3-16	Blackrock	FitzGerald Park

30 August 2014 Round 6	Bruree	0-17 - 0-17	Knockaderry	Páirc Uí Riain

31 August 2014 Round 6	Croom	2-11 - 1-11	Garryspillane	Bruff Sportsfield

13 September 2014 Round 6	Bruff	5-13 - 1-08	Hospital–Herbertstown	FitzGerald Park

13 September 2014 Round 6	Dromin/Athlacca	1-14 - 2-16	Blackrock	FitzGerald Park

19 September 2014 Round 7	Bruree	2-05 - 0-10	Croom	Mick Neville Park

19 September 2014 Round 7	Bruff	1-17 - 1-11	Knockaderry	Gaelic Grounds

19 September 2014 Round 7	Dromin/Athlacca	116 - 3-06	Hospital–Herbertstown	Knocklong Sportsfield

19 September 2014 Round 7	Blackrock	0-11 - 3-08	Garryspillane	Kilbreedy Grounds

== Knockout stage ==
=== Semi-finals ===
11 October 2014 Semi-final	Bruff	0-21 - 1-09	Garryspillane	FitzGerald Park
	S Bulfin 0-13, P O'Leary 0-2, C Browne 0-2, P Browne 0-1, C Madden 0-1, S Finn 0-1, J Cooke 0-1.		Done Ryan 1-3, David Ryan 0-3, C Ryan 0-2, D Hayes 0-1.

11 October 2014 Semi-final	Blackrock	1-17 - 1-17	Croom	FitzGerald Park
	D Dawson 1-10, K Palmer 0-2, B Hennessy 0-2, P Leahy 0-1, D Moloney 0-1, R O'Shaughnessy 0-1.		T Carmody 0-6, M Reidy 0-4, C Laffan 0-3, 1-0, C Allis 0-1, P Behan 0-1, P Lawlor 0-1, M Cahill 0-1.

18 October 2014 Semi-final replay	Blackrock	0-15 - 0-16	Croom	FitzGerald Park
	D Dawson 0-6, R McCarthy 0-4, R O'Shaughnessy 0-2, D Moloney 0-1, P Leahy 0-1.		T Carmody 0-8, M Reidy 0-2, M Cahill 0-1, C Allis 0-1, E O'Farrell 0-1, S Cahill 0-1, P Lawlor 0-1, R O'Shea 0-1.

=== Final ===
25 October 2014 Final	Bruff	2-14 - 0-16	Croom	FitzGerald Park
	S Bulfin 0–6, S Finn 1–2, J Cooke 1–0, P Browne 0–2, T Burke 0–2, C Browne 0–1, P O'Leary 0–1.		T Carmody 0–9, C Allis 0–3, P Lawlor 0–2, E O'Farrell 0–2.
