= Cappamore GAA =

Gaelic games club in County Limerick, Ireland

- An Cheapach Mhór CLG
- Founded: 1887
- County: Limerick
- Colours: Green and Gold
- Grounds: Portnard, Cappamore
- Coordinates: 52°37′20″N 8°20′20″W

Playing kits
Standard colours

Senior Club Championships
	All Ireland	Munster champions	Limerick champions
Hurling:	-	-	5

Cappamore GAA is a Gaelic Athletic Association club located in the village of Cappamore in County Limerick, Ireland. The club is a member of the East Division of Limerick GAA. The main game played by the club is hurling, which has teams at all grades from under 6 to senior. Football is also played from under 6 to junior level. The club's colours are green and gold.

== History ==
The club was founded in 1887. They were promoted back to senior grade in hurling in 2016, after reaching the Premier Intermediate Final.

== Achievements ==
- Limerick Senior Hurling Championship (5): 1904, 1954, 1956, 1959, 1964
- Limerick Intermediate Hurling Championship (1): 2015
- Limerick Junior Hurling Championship (2): 1952, 2011
- Munster Junior Club Hurling Championship (0): (runners-up in 2011)
- Limerick Under-21 Hurling Championship (2): 2006, 2021
- Limerick Junior Football Championship (2): 2004, 2012

== Notable players ==
- Liam Ryan, winning Limerick captain 1955
- John Hayes
- Pat Mulcahy
