= Knockainey GAA =

Irish Gaelic Athletic Association club

Knockainey
- Cnoc Áine
- Founded: 1936
- County: Limerick
- Colours: Black and white
- Grounds: Ballynalahagh, Knockainey

Playing kits
Standard colours

Knockainey is a Gaelic Athletic Association club located in Knockainey, County Limerick, Ireland. The club, founded in 1936, fields teams in both hurling and Gaelic football. Knockainey's nickname is "All Blacks" which was inspired by New Zealand Rugby team. Knockainey wear black jersey's which were also inspired by The All Blacks.

== Honours ==
- Limerick Junior Hurling Championship (2):1953, 1991
- Limerick Intermediate Hurling Championship (1): 2001
- Limerick Minor A Hurling Championship (1): 2021

== Notable players ==
- Tommy Cooke
