= Blackrock GAA (Limerick) =

Gaelic games club in County Limerick, Ireland

Blackrock
- An Charraig Dhubh
- Founded: 1972
- County: Limerick
- Colours: Green and white
- Grounds: Michael Fox Park, Kilfinane

Playing kits
Standard colours

Senior Club Championships
	All Ireland	Munster champions	Limerick champions
Football:	0	0	0
Hurling:	0	0	0

Blackrock is a Gaelic Athletic Association club based in Kilfinane, County Limerick, Ireland. The club was founded in 1972 as a result of an amalgamation between the Kilfinane and Ardpatrick clubs and is named after the hill overlooking the two parishes. The club fields teams in both hurling and Gaelic football

== Honours ==
- Limerick Premier Intermediate Hurling Championship: (1) 2019
- Limerick Intermediate Hurling Championship: (1) 1993
- All-Ireland Junior Club Hurling Championship: (1) 2010
- Munster Junior Club Hurling Championship: (1): 2009
- Limerick Junior Hurling Championship: (1): 2009

== Notable players ==
- Pat Heffernan
- Richie McCarthy
