= FitzGerald Park, Kilmallock =

Gaelic games stadium in County Limerick, Ireland

John FitzGerald Park
- Páirc Sheáin Mhic Gearailt
- Interactive map of John FitzGerald Park
- Location: Kilmallock, County Limerick, Ireland
- Coordinates: 52°23′53″N 8°34′25″W
- Owner: Kilmallock GAA
- Surface: Grass
- Field size: 81 m × 145 m (89 yd × 159 yd)
- Public transit: Kilmallock bus stop (Post Office)

John FitzGerald Park is a GAA stadium in Kilmallock, County Limerick, Ireland. It is the home of Kilmallock GAA club and is one of the main grounds of Limerick GAA's Gaelic football and hurling teams.

Located on Emmet Street, in the south of the town, Gortboy townland, it was named for John Fitzgerald in 1980; he served as club secretary for many decades up to 1971.

Part of the stand was damaged by Storm Éowyn in January 2025.
