= 1981 Limerick Senior Hurling Championship =

Annual hurling competition season

- Dates: 13 September – 1 November 1981
- Teams: 8
- Champions: South Liberties (7th title); Joe Grimes (captain)
- Runners-up: Kilmallock; Paddy Kelly (captain)

Tournament statistics
- Matches played: 8
- Goals scored: 27 (3.38 per match)
- Points scored: 146 (18.25 per match)
- Top scorer(s): Paddy Kelly (3–25)

The 1981 Limerick Senior Hurling Championship was the 87th staging of the Limerick Senior Hurling Championship since its establishment by the Limerick County Board in 1887. The championship ran from 13 September to 1 November 1981.

Killeedy entered the championship as the defending champions, however, they were beaten by Tournafulla in the West Limerick SHC semi-final.

The final, a replay, was played on 1 November 1981 at the Gaelic Grounds in Limerick, between South Liberties and Kilmallock, in what was their second meeting in the final overall and a first final meeting in 14 years. South Liberties won the match by 4–07 to 2–11 to claim their seventh championship title overall and a first title in three years.

Kilmallock's Paddy Kelly was the championship's Top scorer with 3–25.

== Teams ==
Championship	Champions	Runners-up
Limerick City Senior Hurling Championship	Claughaun	Patrickswell
East Limerick Senior Hurling Championship	South Liberties	Fedamore
South Limerick Senior Hurling Championship	Kilmallock	Bruree
West Limerick Senior Hurling Championship	Tournafulla	Granagh

== Results ==
=== Quarter-finals ===
13 September 1981 Quarter-final	Bruree	2–11 – 2–10	Patrickswell	Bruff Grounds
	P O'Brien 1–2, J Potter 1–2, P Potter 0–2, D Deedy 0–2, M Mullane 0–1, E O'Dea 0–1, D Mullane 0–1.		R Bennis 1–5, J Enright 1–1, F Nolan 0–1, L Considine 0–1, D Punch 0–1, P Foley 0–1.

13 September 1981 Quarter-final	Kilmallock	1–14 – 2–08	Claughaun	Bruff Grounds
	P Kelly 0–7, B Savage 0–4, M Maguire 1–0, D Barry 0–1, D O'Riordan 0–1, M Nelligan 0–1.		D Graham 2–1, E Cregan 0–4, D Fitzgerald 0–2, W Conway 0–1.

13 September 1981 Quarter-final	Fedamore	0–11 – 0–07	Tournafulla	Páirc na nGael

13 September 1981 Quarter-final	South Liberties	4–11 – 2–12	Granagh	Páirc na nGael
	E Grimes 3–4.

=== Semi-finals ===
27 September 1981 Semi-final	South Liberties	2–06 – 2–03	Bruree	Bruff Grounds
	P Portley 2–0, E Grimes 0–3, T Ryan 0–1, L Grimes 0–1, M Shanahan 0–1.		J Potter 2–2, M Mullane 0–1.

Semi-final	Kilmallock	5–08 – 1–09	Fedamore	Bruff Grounds
	P Kelly 1–5, D O'Riordan 2–1, M Maguire 2–0, J Keane 0–2.		W O'Mahony 1–1, J Flavin 0–3, T McNamara 0–3, J Condon 0–2.

=== Final ===
25 October 1981 Final	South Liberties	0–12 – 2–06	Kilmallock	Gaelic Grounds
	J McKenna 0–6, E Grimes 0–2, T Ryan 0–2, M Shanahan 0–1, M Grimes 0–1.		P Kelly 1–5, T Moloney 1–0, M Nelligan 0–1.

=== Final replay ===
1 November 1981 Final replay	South Liberties	4–07 – 2–11	Kilmallock	Gaelic Grounds
	M Butler 2–0, E Grimes 0–5, J McKenna 1–0, T Ryan 1–0, M Shanahan 0–1.		P Kelly 1–8, O Cussen 1–1, D O'Riordan 0–1, T Moloney 0–1.
