= 2022 Limerick Senior Hurling Championship =

Annual hurling competition season

- Dates: 28 July – 30 October 2022
- Teams: 12
- Sponsor: Bon Secours Hospital
- Champions: Na Piarsaigh (7th title); William O'Donoghue (captain); Kieran Berminghanm (manager)
- Runners-up: Kilmallock; Oisín O'Reilly (captain); Fintan O'Connor (manager)

Tournament statistics
- Matches played: 35
- Goals scored: 79 (2.26 per match)
- Points scored: 1255 (35.86 per match)
- Top scorer(s): Tom Morrissey (3–57)

The 2022 Limerick Senior Hurling Championship was the 128th staging of the Limerick Senior Hurling Championship since its establishment by the Limerick County Board in 1887. The draws for the group stage pairings took place on 22 February 2022. The championship ran from 28 July to October 2022.

Kilmallock entered the championship as the defending champions. Blackrock were relegated after three years of top tier hurling.

The final was played on 30 October 2022 at the TUS Gaelic Grounds in Limerick, between Na Piarsaigh and Kilmallock, in what was their third ever meeting in the final and a first meeting in five years. Na Piarsaigh won the match by 3–23 to 2–15 to claim their seventh championship title overall and a first title in three years.

Ahane's Tom Morrissey was the championship's top scorer with 3–57.

== Team changes ==
=== To Championship ===
Promoted from the Limerick Premier Intermediate Hurling Championship

- Mungret/St. Paul's

=== From Championship ===
Relegated to the Limerick Premier Intermediate Hurling Championship

- Monaleen

== Fixtures and results ==
=== Group 1 ===
==== Group 1 table ====
Advance to semi-finals Advance to quarter-finals Relegated

| Team | Matches | | | | Score | | | Pts |
| Team | Pld | W | D | L | For | Against | Diff | Pts |
|---|---|---|---|---|---|---|---|---|
| Na Piarsaigh | 5 | 4 | 1 | 0 | 125 | 92 | 33 | 9 |
| Kilmallock | 5 | 3 | 1 | 1 | 134 | 97 | 37 | 7 |
| Doon | 5 | 3 | 1 | 1 | 122 | 104 | 18 | 7 |
| Patrickswell | 5 | 2 | 0 | 3 | 100 | 118 | −18 | 4 |
| Ahane | 5 | 0 | 2 | 3 | 95 | 122 | −27 | 2 |
| Adare | 5 | 0 | 1 | 4 | 83 | 126 | −43 | 1 |

==== Group 1 fixtures and results ====
| 28 July 2022 Round 1 | Ahane | 1–15 – 1–15 | Adare | Childres Road |
| | T Morrissey 1–9 (4f, 1 ’65), W Brennan 0–2, J Enright, D Minehan, M Donnellan and C Barry 0–1 each. | Report | W Griffin 1–4 (1f), J Fitzgibbon 0–4 (1f, 1 s/;), D O’Mahony 0–3, S Heffernan, J Sweeney, C McCarthy and B Flynn 0–1 each. | Referee: J Murphy (Ballylanders) |

| 30 July 2022 Round 1 | Na Piarsaigh | 2–20 – 1–18 | Doon | Childres Road |
| | K Downes 0–10, D Dempsey 1–1, C Boylan 1–0, A Breen 0–3, P Casey 0–2, R Lynch 0–1, M Foley 0–1, K Dempsey 0–1, W O'Donoghue 0–1. | | D Coleman 1–6, B Murphy 0–6, P Ryan 0–2, D O'Donovan 0–2, C Ryan 0–1, R English 0–1. |

| 30 July 2022 Round 1 | Kilmallock | 2–23 – 2–09 | Patrickswell | Newcastle West Grounds |
| | M Houlihan 0–8, S O'Brien 1–3, C Hanley-Clarke 1–2, O O'Reilly 0–4, G O'Mahony 0–2, P O'Reilly 0–2, G Mulcahy 0–1, R Hanley 0–1. | | T O'Brien 1–0, J Higgins 1–0, A Gillane 0–3, D Byrne 0–2, P Kirby 0–2, J Flynn 0–1, J Kirby 0–1. |

| 5 August 2022 Round 2 | Doon | 1–20 – 1–14 | Adare | Childres Road |
| | P Ryan 1–5, B Murphy 0–4, G Thomas 0–3, K Maher 0–2, D Coleman 0–2, D O'Donovan 0–2, R English 0–2. | | W Griffin 0–13, J Fitzgibbon 1–0, S Heffernan 0–1. |

| 6 August 2022 Round 2 | Ahane | 0–20 – 2–19 | Patrickswell | Fr. Hayes Memorial Park |
| | T Morrissey 0–15, N Moran 0–2, C Carroll 0–2, C Barry 0–1. | | J Higgins 2–2, P Kirby 0–3, M Carmody 0–3, D Byrnes 0–2, J Kelleher 0–2, A Gillane 0–2, S O'Brien 0–2, J Kirby 0–1, D Ahern 0–1, C Carroll 0–1. |

| 6 August 2022 Round 2 | Na Piarsaigh | 1–19 – 1–18 | Kilmallock | Doon GAA Field |
| | K Downes 0–7, D Dempsey 1–2, A Breen 0–2, P Casey 0–2, W Henn 0–2, W O'Donoghue 0–1, K Dempsey 0–1, M Foley 0–1, R Lynch 0–1. | | M Houlihan 0–12, S O'Brien 1–1, P O'Reilly 0–2, R Hanley 0–1, G Mulcahy 0–1, O O'Reilly 0–1. |

| 1 September 2022 Round 3 | Adare | 0–17 – 3–26 | Kilmallock | Ballyagran Grounds |
| | W Griffin 0–10, C McCarthy 0–2, D Hannon 0–1, J Gahan 0–1, S Heffernan 0–1, J Sweeney 0–1, C Sparling 0–1. | | O O'Reilly 2–4, G Mulcahy 0–7, S O'Brien 0–5, K Hayes 1–1, C Hanley-Clarke 0–3, M Houlihan 0–2, R Hanley 0–1, R Egan 0–1, K O'Donnell 0–1, D Woulfe 0–1. |

| 2 September 2022 Round 3 | Doon | 5–14 – 0–13 | Ahane | Cappamore Grounds |
| | B Murphy 1–5, D Coleman 2–1, P Ryan 1–2, D Stapleton 1–1, P Cummins 0–2, J Ryan 0–1, R English 0–1, C O'Donovan 0–1. | | T Morrissey 0–9, C Carroll 0–1, N Moran 0–1, R Fox 0–1, D Minehan 0–1. |

| 3 September 2022 Round 3 | Patrickswell | 0–12 – 1–23 | Na Piarsaigh | FitzGerald Park, Kilmallock |
| | M Carmody 0–4, D Byrnes 0–4, A Gillane 0–3, P Kirby 0–1. | | K Downes 0–7, A Breen 0–6, P Casey 1–2, W Henn 0–3, R Lynch 0–2, D Dempsey 0–2, W O'Donoughue 0–1. |

| 9 September 2022 Round 4 | Kilmallock | 1–22 – 1–16 | Ahane | Doon Grounds |
| | S O'Brien 0–9, O O'Reilly 1–3, A Costello 0–2, G Mulcahy 0–2, R Hanley 0–1, R Egan 0–1, K Hayes 0–1, D Woulfe 0–1, P O'Loughlin 0–1, C Hanley-Clarke 0–1. | | T Morrissey 1–11, R Fox 0–2, C Carroll 0–1, N Moran 0–1, W Brennan 0–1. |

| 10 September 2022 Round 4 | Na Piarsaigh | 2–20 – 0–13 | Adare | Ballybrown Grounds |
| | A Breen 2–3, K Downes 0–7, P Casey 0–3, W Henn 0–2, K Dempsey 0–2, C Boylan 0–1, K Kennedy 0–1, G Synnott 0–1. | | J Fitzgibbon 0–7, W Griffin 0–3, S Connolly 0–1, J McSweeney 0–1, C McCarthy 0–1. |

| 10 September 2022 Round 4 | Patrickswell | 1–21 – 2–19 | Doon | FitzGerald Park, Kilmallock |
| | A Gillane 1–10, M Carmody 0–3, D Byrne 0–3, J Kelleher 0–2, K O'Brien 0–1, T O'Brien 0–1, C Carroll 0–1. | | B Murphy 0–7, P Ryan 1–2, P Cummins 1–1, C Ryan 0–2, Jack Ryan 0–2, D Coleman 0–2, Josh Ryan 0–2, D O'Donovan 0–1. |

| 18 September 2022 Round 5 | Doon | 1–21 – 0–24 | Kilmallock | Fedamore Grounds |
| | D Coleman 0–6, P Ryan 1–2, E Stokes 0–4, D O'Donovan 0–3, C Ryan 0–2, C Thomas 0–1, R English 0–1, K Maher 0–1, J Ryan 0–1. | | C Hanley-Clarke 0–11, K O'Donnell 0–4, D Woulfe 0–3, G Mulahy 0–3, R Egan 0–2, R Hanley 0–1. |

| 18 September 2022 Round 5 | Ahane | 1–22 – 1–22 | Na Piarsaigh | FitzGerald Park, Kilmallock |
| | T Morrissey 1–13, C Barry 0–3, C Carroll 0–2, R Fox 0–2, N Moran 0–1, M Donnelly 0–1. | | K Downes 1–10, P Casey 0–3, A Breen 0–3, C Boylan 0–2, K Dempsey 0–2, D Dempsey 0–1, W Henn 0–1. |

| 18 September 2022 Round 5 | Patrickswell | 1–21 – 2–12 | Adare | FitzGerald Park, Kilmallock |
| | A Gillane 0–8, J Kelleher 0–6, P Kirby 1–1, M Carmody 0–2, K O'Brien 0–1, C Carroll 0–1, D Byrnes 0–1, J Considine 0–1. | | W Griffin 1–7, J Fitzgibbon 1–3, D Hannon 0–1, C McCarthy 0–1. |

=== Group 2 ===
==== Group 2 table ====
Promoted and advance to quarter-finals Advance to quarter-finals Relegated

| Team | Matches | | | | Score | | | Pts |
| Team | Pld | W | D | L | For | Against | Diff | Pts |
|---|---|---|---|---|---|---|---|---|
| Kildimo-Pallaskenry | 5 | 4 | 0 | 1 | 107 | 85 | 22 | 8 |
| South Liberties | 5 | 3 | 0 | 2 | 108 | 110 | −2 | 6 |
| Ballybrown | 5 | 3 | 0 | 2 | 115 | 95 | 20 | 6 |
| Mungret/St. Paul's | 5 | 2 | 1 | 2 | 109 | 123 | −14 | 5 |
| Garryspillane | 5 | 2 | 0 | 3 | 104 | 106 | −2 | 4 |
| Blackrock | 5 | 0 | 1 | 4 | 99 | 123 | −24 | 1 |

==== Group 2 fixtures and results ====
| 29 July 2022 Round 1 | Mungret/St. Paul's | 1–16 – 1–13 | Kildimo-Pallaskenry | Ballybrown Grounds |
| | P O’Bren 1–10 (8f), C O’Halloran 0–2, B Barry, B O’Meara, N Mulcahy and C O’Brien 0–1 each. | | B O’Connell 0–7 (5f, 1’65), K Hayes 1–3, D Fitzgerald, C Downes and J O’Keeffe 0–1 each. | Referee: D Deady (Bruree) |

| 30 July 2022 Round 1 | Garryspillane | 0–20 – 1–18 | South Liberties | Doon GAA Field |
| | | | K Byrnes 0–7, B Nash 1–3, T Ryan 0–2, D O'Neill, B Ryan, A Nash, D Garry, B Cooney, C McSweeney 0–1 each. |

| 30 July 2022 Round 1 | Ballybrown | 1–18 – 0–13 | Blackrock | Ballyagran Grounds |
| | A O'Connor 0–8, R Kenny 1–1, C Coughlan 0–4, K Gavin 0–2, M Gavin 0–1, A Cliffe 0–1, L O'Connor 0–1. | | P Leahy 0–4, J Quilty 0–3, R O'Shaughnessy 0–3, D Dawson 0–2, M Farrell 0–1. |

| 5 August 2022 Round 2 | Blackrock | 1–18 – 2–17 | Garryspillane | FitzGerald Park, Kilmallock |
| | P Leahye 1–8, S O'Neill 0–3, R O'Shaughnessy 0–3, D Dawson 0–3, K Palmer 0–1. | | D O'Shea 0–9, E Sheehan 0–4, P Kennedy 1–0, C Sheehan 1–0, B Heavey 0–2, G Power 0–1, D Barry 0–1. |

| 6 August 2022 Round 2 | South Liberties | 0–11 – 0–18 | Kildimo-Pallaskenry | Ballybrown Grounds |
| | K Byrnes 0–3, B Nash 0–2, B Ryan 0–2, B Cooney 0–2, D Garry 0–1, C McSweeney 0–1. | | B O'Connell 0–7, K Hayes 0–5, J O'Keeffe 0–3, D O'Connell 0–1, L Griffin 0–1, S Barry 0–1. |

| 6 August 2022 Round 2 | Ballybrown | 2–25 – 1–14 | Mungret/St. Paul's | Childers Road |
| | J Adams 1–3, A O'Connor 0–6, C Coughlan 0–6, B Griffin 1–1, L O'Connor 0–4, R Kenny 0–2, M Sheehan 0–1, K Gavin 0–1, D Hall 0–1. | | P O'Brien 0–9, N Mulcahy 1–1, B Barry 0–1, C Linehan 0–1, B Duff 0–1, C O'Halloran 0–1. |

| 3 September 2022 Round 3 | Blackrock | 0–22 – 0–23 | South Liberties | Cappamore Grounds |
| | P Leahy 0–13, S O'Neill 0–4, M Farrell 0–1, K Palmer 0–1, R O'Shaughnessy 0–1, C O'Keeffe 0–1, D Moloney 0–1. | | B Nash 0–10, B Cooney 0–3, T Ryan 0–2, B Garry 0–2, K Byrnes 0–1, D O'Neill 0–1, J Hickey 0–1, C McSweeney 0–1, B Ryan 0–1, E Godfrey 0–1. |

| 3 September 2022 Round 3 | Kildimo-Pallaskenry | 1–17 – 1–16 | Ballybrown | Páirc na nGael |
| | S Barry 0–9, J Chawke 1–0, K Hayes 0–3, B O'Connell 0–2, C Staff 0–1, J O'Keeffe 0–1, D Fitzgerald 0–1. | | R Kenny 1–1, A O'Connor 0–4, C Coughlan 0–4, L O'Connor 0–4, J Adams 0–2, A Cliffe 0–1. |

| 4 September 2022 Round 3 | Garryspillane | 2–18 – 1–17 | Mungret/St. Paul's | Doon Grounds |
| | C Sheehan 2–2, D O'Shea 0–8, B Heavey 0–3, E Sheehan 0–2, D Barry 0–1, M Quinlan 0–1, M Bourke 0–1. | | P O'Brien 0–7, N Mulcahy 1–1, B Giltenane 0–4, B Duff 0–2, R Duff 0–1, B O'Meara 0–1, C Linehan 0–1. |

| 8 September 2022 Round 4 | Ballybrown | 0–21 – 2–12 | Garryspillane | Fr. Hayes Memorial Park |
| | A O'Connor 0–10, C Coughlan 0–4, M Gavin 0–2, B Griffin 0–2, L Doolan 0–1, R Kenny 0–1, L O'Connor 0–1. | | D O'Shea 1–7, C Sheehan 1–0, E Sheehan 0–2, B Heavey 0–1, J English 0–1, D Barry 0–1. |

| 9 September 2022 Round 4 | Mungret/St. Paul's | 1–24 – 2–20 | South Liberties | Childers Road |
| | P O'Brien 0–14, N Mulcahy 1–0, B Barry 0–3, B Duff 0–2, R Duff 0–2, B O'Meara 0–1, B Giltenane 0–1, S Barry 0–1. | | B Nash 0–12, T Ryan 0–5, K Byrnes 1–0, B Ryan 1–0, B Cooney 0–2, C McSweeny 0–1. |

| 10 September 2022 Round 4 | Kildimo-Pallaskenry | 1–27 – 1–14 | Blackrock | Ballyagran Grounds |
| | K Hayes 0–10, S Barry 0–7, J Chawke 1–0, B O'Connell 0–2, C Downes 0–2, L Griffin 0–2, J O'Keeffe 0–1, D Fitzgerald 0–1, C Staff 0–1, R Kelly 0–1. | | J Quilty 1–3, P Leahy 0–2, R O'Shaughnessy 0–2, S O'Neill 0–2, J O'Doherty 0–2, D Moloney 0–1, D Dawson 0–1, K Palmer 0–1. |

| 17 September 2022 Round 5 | Garryspillane | 0–19 – 0–23 | Kildimo-Pallaskenry | Fr. Hayes Memorial Park |
| | D O'Shea 0–5, B Heavey 0–5, E Sheehan 0–3, G Power 0–3, K Hickey 0–1, C Sheehan 0–1, M Bourke 0–1. | | S Barry 0–14, C Downes 0–3, D O'Connell 0–2, J O'Keeffe 0–1, K Hayes 0–1, P Hartigan 0–1, D Corrigan 0–1. |

| 17 September 2022 Round 5 | Blackrock | 3–17 – 2–20 | Mungret/St. Paul's | Ballyagran Grounds |
| | P Leahy 0–9, R O'Shaughnessy 1–1, C Considine 1–1, C O'Keeffe 1–0, J Quilty 0–3, J O'Doherty 0–2, K Palmer 0–1. | | N Mulcahy 2–1, P O'Brien 0–7, R Duff 0–2, B Duff 0–2, S Barry 0–2, C O'Halloran 0–2, B Giltenane 0–2, J McCarthy 0–1, M O'Sullivan 0–1. |

| 17 September 2022 Round 5 | South Liberties | 3–18 – 1–20 | Ballybrown | Fedamore Grounds |
| | A Nash 0–8, T Ryan 2–1, B Nash 0–4, K Byrnes 1–0, B Cooney 0–3, B Ryan 0–2, M Keane 0–1. | | A O'Connor 1–13, A Cliffe 0–1, R Kenny 0–1, B O'Connor 0–1, L O'Connor 0–1, R Griffin 0–1. |

=== Knockout stage ===
==== Quarter-finals ====
| 8 October 2022 Quarter-final | Doon | 1–20 – 0–19 | Kildimo-Pallaskenry | FitzGerald Park, Kilmallock |
| 15:30 | A English 0–6 (5nf), D Coleman 1–1 (1f), P Cummins 0–4, D O’Donovan (1 sideline), E Stokes and C Ryan (1f, 1 ’65) 0–2 each, K Maher, R English and C Thomas 0–1 each. | | S Barry 0–13 (11f, 1 sideline, 1 ’65), K Hayes and D O’Connell 0–2 each, B O’Connell and C Downes 0–1 each. |

| 9 October 2022 Quarter-final | Patrickswell | 0–14 – 1–13 | South Liberties | FitzGerald Park, Kilmallock |
| 14:00 | A Gillane 0–5 (5f), D Byrnes 0–3 (3f), J Kelleher 0–2, J Considine, T O’Brien, S O’Brien and K O’Brien 0–1 each. | Report | Barry Nash 0–8 (6f), B Ryan 1–1, T Ryan 0–2, B Cooney and C McSweeney 0–1 each. | Referee: J O'Halloran (Bruree) |

==== Semi-finals ====
| 15 October 2022 Semi-final | Na Piarsaigh | 1–23 – 0–09 | South Liberties | FitzGerald Park, Kilmallock |
| 15:30 | K Downes 0–8 (8f), A Breen 0–6, D Dempsey 1–1, P Casey, W Henn and M Foley 0–2 each, C Boylan and K Dempsey 0–1 each. | Report | B Nash 0–6 (5f, 1 ’65), D Garry, B Cooney and B Ryan 0–1 each. | Referee: D Deady (Bruree) |

| 16 October 2022 Semi-final | Kilmallock | 1–13 – 2–09 | Doon | Bruff Grounds |
| 15:30 | M Houlihan 0–4 (3f, 1’65), C Hanley Clarke (3f) 0–3, R Egan 1–0, G Mulcahy and S O’Brien 0–2 each, P O’Reilly and O O’Reilly 0–1 each. | Report | D Coleman 1–1, D Stapleton 1–0, B Murphy 0–2, A English (1f), P Ryan, C Ryan (1f), J Cummins, J Ryan, D O’Donovan (1f) 0–1 each. | Referee: J O'Halloran (Bruree) |

==== Final ====
| 30 October 2022 Final | Na Piarsaigh | 3–23 – 2–15 | Kilmallock | TUS Gaelic Grounds |
| | A Breen 2–3; P Casey 0–7, K Downes 0–7 (6 frees) each, D Dempsey 1–1; R Lynch 0–2 (frees), M Foley, K Dempsey, W Henn, 0–1 each. | Report | M Houlihan (frees), G Mulcahy 0–4 each; C Hanley-Clarke (frees) 1–1; K Hayes, D Woulfe, R Hanley 0–2 each. | Referee: J Murphy (Ballylanders) |

== Championship statistics ==
=== Top scorers ===
Overall

| Rank | Player | Club | Tally | Total | Matches | Average |
|---|---|---|---|---|---|---|
| 1 | Tom Morrissey | Ahane | 3–57 | 66 | 5 | 13.20 |
| 2 | Kevin Downes | Na Piarsaigh | 1–56 | 59 | 7 | 8.42 |
| 3 | Paul O'Brien | Mungret/St. Paul's | 1–47 | 50 | 5 | 10.00 |

=== Miscellaneous ===
- Kildimo-Pallaskenry qualified for the knockout stages for the first time since 1937.
- South Liberties qualify for the semi-final for the first time since 1985.
