= 1986 Limerick Senior Hurling Championship =

Annual hurling competition season

- Champions: Claughaun (10th title); Éamonn Cregan (captain)
- Runners-up: Adare

The 1986 Limerick Senior Hurling Championship was the 92nd staging of the Limerick Senior Hurling Championship since its establishment by the Limerick County Board in 1887.

Kilmallock entered the championship as the defending champions, however, they were beaten by Adare in the quarter-finals.

The final was played on 28 September 1986 at the Gaelic Grounds in Limerick, between Claughaun and Adare, in what was their second meeting in the final overall and a first final meeting in 18 years. Claughaun won the match by 1–09 to 0–09 to claim their 10th championship title overall and a first title in 15 years.

== Results ==
=== Quarter-finals ===
12 July 1986 Quarter-final	Claughaun	1–18 – 2–13	Ardagh	FitzGerald Park
	D Fitzgerald 1–4, L O'Connor 0–4, G Ryan 0–3, É Cregan 0–3, M Ryan 0–2, J Rea 0–1, M Rea 0–1.		M O'Connor 1–5, M O'Brien 0–5, R Woulfe 1–1, M Woulfe 0–2.

13 July 1986 Quarter-final	Kilmallock	1–08 – 1–11	Adare	Bruff Grounds
	J Neenan 1–1, P Kelly 0–4, S Carroll 0–2, D Riordan 0–1.		S Fitzgibbon 1–2, M Benson 0–5, B Heffernan 0–1, D Marron 0–1, T Dunne 0–1, PJ Kinnavane 0–1.

13 July 1986 Quarter-final	Garryspillane	1–10 – 2–11	Killeedy	Bruff Grounds
	K Walsh 0–6, B Carroll 1–1, D Barry 0–1, W Burke 0–1, B Stapleton 0–1.		P Fitzmaurice 1–5, K Kiely 1–0, T Mulcahy 0–2, M Scanlan 0–1, J Magner 0–1, W Fitzmaurice 0–1, D O'Connor 0–1.

13 July 1986 Quarter-final	Cappmore	2–11 – 0–07	Fedamore	Fr Hayes Memorial Park
	L O'Brien 1–2, D Mulcahy 0–4, N Sheehan 0–3, I Walsh 0–2.		S O'Dwyer 0–2, M Hedderman 0–2, S Fitzgibbon 0–1, J Condon 0–1, S Prendergast 0–1.

=== Semi-final ===
24 August 1986 Semi-final	Claughaun	6–15 – 4–05	Killeedy	FitzGerald Park
	L O'Connor 2–9, G Ryan 2–0, D Fitzgerald 1–2, M Rea 1–1, M Ryan 0–3.		W Fitzmaurice 2–2, J McGrath 1–0, G Forde 1–0, P Fitzmaurice 0–3.

31 August 1986 Semi-final	Adare	3–12 – 1–05	Cappamore	Bruff Grounds
	M Benson 0–8, Declan Marron 1–0, Donal Marron 1–0, S Fitzgibbon 1–0, M Alfred 0–2, B Heffernan 0–1, T Dunne 0–1.		M Clarke 1–0, D Mulcahy 0–2, G Sheehan 0–1, D McKenna 0–1, N Sheehan 0–1.

=== Final ===
28 September 1986 Final	Claughaun	1–09 – 0–09	Adare	Gaelic Grounds, Limerick
	L O'Connor 0–4, M Rea 1–0, A Maloney 0–2, M Ryan 0–2, M Molyneaux 0–1.		M Benson 0–7, S Fitzgerald 0–2.	Referee: S Burke (Garryspillane)
