= 1976 Limerick Senior Hurling Championship =

Annual hurling competition season

- Dates: 15 August – 3 October 1976
- Teams: 7
- Champions: South Liberties (5th title); Walter Shanahan (captain)
- Runners-up: Killeedy; Con Herbert (captain)

Tournament statistics
- Matches played: 7
- Goals scored: 21 (3 per match)
- Points scored: 127 (18.14 per match)
- Top scorer(s): Willie Fitzmaurice (3–18)

The 1976 Limerick Senior Hurling Championship was the 82nd staging of the Limerick Senior Hurling Championship since its establishment by the Limerick County Board in 1887. The championship ran from 15 August to 3 October 1976.

Kilmallock entered the championship as the defending champions, however, they were beaten by South Liberties in the quarter-finals.

The final was played on 3 October 1976 at the Gaelic Grounds in Limerick, between South Liberties and Killleedy, in what was their first ever meeting in the final. South Liberties won the match by 2–09 to 2–06 to claim their fifth championship title overall and a first title in four years.

Killeedy's Willie Fitzmaurice was the championship's top scorer with 3–18.

== Teams ==
Championship	Champions	Runners-up
Limerick City Senior Hurling Championship	Patrickswell	Claughaun
East Limerick Senior Hurling Championship	South Liberties	n/a
South Limerick Senior Hurling Championship	Bruree	Kilmallock
West Limerick Senior Hurling Championship	Killeedy	Newcastle West

== Results ==
=== Quarter-finals ===
15 August 1976 Quarter-final	Patrickswell	0–13 – 0–06	Newcastle West	Páirc na nGael

22 August 1976 Quarter-final	Claughaun	1–11 – 1–11	Killeedy	Bruff Grounds
	E Tuohy 0–7, D Sheehan 1–0, B Barry 0–2, T Marsh 0–2.		W Fitzmaurice 0–5, G Forde 1–1, M Scanlan 0–2, T Mulcahy 0–2, D Flynn 0–1.

29 August 1976 Quarter-final	South Liberties	4–11 – 2–14	Kilmallock	Gaelic Grounds
	D O'Sullivan 2–2, E Grimes 1–4, L Grimes 1–0, J McKenna 0–3, T Ryan 0–2.		P Kelly 0–11, B Savage 1–0, T Moloney 1–0, D O'Riordan 0–2, D Connolly 0–1.

29 August 1976 Quarter-final replay	Killeedy	5–07 – 2–06	Claughaun	Bruff Grounds
	G Forde 3–1, W Fitzmaurice 2–3, P Fitzmaurice 0–1, T Mulcahy 0–1, W Cronin 0–1.		B Barry 1–1, E Cregan 1–0, E Tuohy 0–1, M Graham 0–1, T Marsh 0–1, D Lehane 0–1, D Sheehan 0–1.

- Bruree received a bye in this round.

=== Semi-finals ===
12 September 1976 Semi-final	Killeedy	1–11 – 1–07	Patrickswell	FitzGerald Park
	W Fitzmaurice 0–7, M Fitzmaurice 1–0, P Fitzmaurice 0–1, T Mulcahy 0–1, W Cronin 0–1, D Flynn 0–1.		R Bennis 0–5, J Lynch 1–1, L Enright 0–1.

19 September 1976 Semi-final	South Liberties	0–08 – 0–07	Bruree	Gaelic Grounds
	E Grimes 0–3, T Ryan 0–3, L Grimes 0–1, J Moynihan 0–1.		P O'Brien 0–4, J Fitzgerald 0–1, P Ryan 0–1, G Moloney 0–1.

=== Final ===
3 October 1976 Final	South Liberties	2–09 – 2–06	Killeedy	Gaelic Grounds
	D O'Sullivan 1–0, J Moynihan 1–0, E Grimes 0–3, M Butler 0–2, J McKenna 0–2, E Dooley 0–1, T Ryan 0–1.		W Fitzmaurice 1–3, G Forde 1–0, T Mulcahy 0–1, M Scanlan 0–1, W Fitzmaurice 0–1.

== Championship statistics ==
=== Top scorers ===
Rank	Player	Club	Tally	Total	Matches	Average
1	Willie Fitzmaurice	Killeedy	3–18	27	4	6.75
2	Gerry Forde	Killeedy	5–02	17	4	4.25
3	Éamonn Grimes	South Liberties	1–10	13	3	4.33
