= 1975 Limerick Senior Hurling Championship =

Annual hurling competition season

- Dates: 10 August – 21 September 1975
- Teams: 8
- Champions: Kilmallock (5th title); Dominic Hayes (captain)
- Runners-up: Patrickswell; Seán Foley (captain)

Tournament statistics
- Matches played: 7
- Goals scored: 26 (3.71 per match)
- Points scored: 155 (22.14 per match)
- Top scorer(s): Paddy Kelly (0–34)

The 1975 Limerick Senior Hurling Championship was the 81st staging of the Limerick Senior Hurling Championship since its establishment by the Limerick County Board in 1887. The championship ran from 10 August to 21 September 1975.

Kilmallock entered the championship as the defending champions.

The final was played on 21 September 1975 at the Gaelic Grounds in Limerick, between Kilmallock and Patrickswell, in what was their third meeting in the final overall and a second consecutive meeting in the final. Kilmallock won the match by 3–14 to 3–07 to claim their fifth championship title overall and a third title in succession.

Kilmallock's Paddy Kelly was the championship's top scorer with 0–34.

== Teams ==
Championship	Champions	Runners-up
Limerick City Senior Hurling Championship	Patrickswell	Claughaun
East Limerick Senior Hurling Championship	South Liberties	Ahane
South Limerick Senior Hurling Championship	Kilmallock	Bruree
West Limerick Senior Hurling Championship	Adare	Killeedy

== Results ==
=== Quarter-finals ===
10 August 1975 Quarter-final	Ahane	4–08 – 3–21	Patrickswell	Bruff Grounds
	M Rainsford 2–3, J Hassett 1–2, F Berkery 1–0, M Ahern 0–1, P Nash 0–1, P Kelly 0–1.		R Bennis 0–15, J Lynch 2–1, P Bennis 1–1, L Enright 0–2, T Murray 0–1, S Foley 0–1.

10 August 1975 Quarter-final	South Liberties	1–06 – 0–11	Claughaun	Bruff Grounds
	E Grimes 0–4, E Dooley 1–0, J McKenna 0–1, D O'Sullivan 0–1.		W Galligan 0–4, T Maher 0–2, D Sheehan 0–2, B Barry 0–2, É Cregan 0–1.

10 August 1975 Quarter-final	Adare	3–02 – 2–16	Bruree	Gaelic Grounds
	T Reidy 1–1, B Flynn 1–0, T Howard 1–0, D Costelloe 0–1.		P O'Brien 1–5, G Moloney 0–4, J Fitzgerald 1–0, PJ Boyce 0–2, L Moloney 0–2, G Mullane 0–2, J McDonagh 0–1.

10 August 1975 Quarter-final	Kilmallock	1–16 – 1–09	Killeedy	Gaelic Grounds
	P Kelly 0–13, D O'Riordan 1–1, T Moloney 0–1, M Finn 0–1.		W Fitzmaurice 0–5, W Cronin 1–0, P Fitzmaurice 0–2, N Herbert 0–1, D Flynn 0–1.

=== Semi-finals ===
24 August 1975 Semi-final	Patrickswell	3–09 – 1–10	Bruree	Gaelic Grounds
	J Lynch 2–4, F Nolan 1–1, R Bennis 0–2, P Bennis 0–2.		C Moloney 1–2, P O'Brien 0–4, G Mullane 0–2, Moloney 0–1, J McDonagh 0–1.

31 August 1975 Semi-final	Kilmallock	0–16 – 1–10	Claughaun	Bruff Grounds
	P Kelly 0–11, B Savage 0–2, T Moloney 0–1, M Dowling 0–1, J O'Riordan 0–1.		B Galligan 0–6, M Cregan 1–1, N O'Gorman 0–1, D Graham 0–1, É Cregan 0–1.

=== Final ===
21 September 1975 Final	Kilmallock	3–14 – 3–07	Patrickswell	Gaelic Grounds
	P Kelly 0–10, M Finn 1–1, D O'Riordan 1–1, B Savage 1–0, M Carroll 0–1, M Dowling 0–1.		W Fenton 2–2, J Lynch 1–0, P Bennis 0–3, S Foley 0–1, R Bennis 0–1.	Referee: N Duggan (Rathkeale)

== Championship statistics ==
=== Top scorers ===
Rank	Player	Club	Tally	Total	Matches	Average
1	Paddy Kelly	Kilmallock	0–34	34	3	11.33
2	Joe Lynch	Patrickswell	5–05	20	3	6.66
3	Richie Bennis	Patrickswell	0–18	18	3	6.00
4	Pat O'Brien	Bruree	1–09	12	2	6.00
5	Billy Galligan	Claughaun	0–10	10	2	5.00
