= 1978 Limerick Senior Hurling Championship =

Annual hurling competition season

- Dates: 22 July – 17 September 1978
- Teams: 8
- Champions: South Liberties (6th title); Denis O'Sullivan (captain)
- Runners-up: Bruree

Tournament statistics
- Matches played: 8
- Goals scored: 29 (3.63 per match)
- Points scored: 130 (16.25 per match)

The 1978 Limerick Senior Hurling Championship was the 84th staging of the Limerick Senior Hurling Championship since its establishment by the Limerick County Board in 1887.

Patrickswell entered the championship as the defending champions.

The final was played on 17 September 1978 at the Gaelic Grounds in Limerick, between South Liberties and Bruree, in what was their first ever meeting in the final. South Liberties won the match by 2–09 to 2–05 to claim their sixth championship title overall and a first title in two years.

== Teams ==
Championship	Champions	Runners-up
Limerick City Senior Hurling Championship	Patrickswell	Claughaun
East Limerick Senior Hurling Championship	South Liberties	Kilteely-Dromkeen
South Limerick Senior Hurling Championship	Bruree	Dromin/Athlacca
West Limerick Senior Hurling Championship	Killeedy	Adare

== Results ==
=== Quarter-finals ===
22 July 1978 Quarter-final	Killeedy	2–08 – 0–08	Kilteely-Dromkeen	Bruff Grounds
	D Flynn 1–2, T Mulcahy 1–0, W Cronin 0–3, W Fitzmaurice 0–2, C Herbert 0–1.		P Murphy 0–2, D Murphy 0–2, P Reddan 0–1, J McCarthy 0–1, G Murphy 0–1, JJ Bermingham 0–1.

23 July 1978 Quarter-final	South Liberties	3–09 – 1–10	Adare	Gaelic Grounds
	M Butler 1–1, E Grimes 0–4, J Moynihan 1–0, D O'Sullivan 1–0, J McKenna 0–3, M Shanahan 0–1.		B Flynn 1–2, T Dunne 0–3, G Hickey 0–2, M Bourke 0–1, E Mackessy 0–1, T Reidy 0–1.

29 July 1978 Quarter-final	Patrickswell	3–16 – 2–04	Dromin/Athlacca	Bruff Grounds
	R Bennis 1–5, J Lynch 1–2, F Nolan 0–5, S Foley 1–0, J Fenton 0–2, D Punch 0–1, L Foley 0–1.		E Hayes 2–1, J Neenan 0–2, B Neenan 0–1.

30 July 1978 Quarter-final	Bruree	3–12 – 2–03	Claughaun	Fr Hayes Memorial Park
	M Moloney 2–1, F McDonagh 0–5, P O'Brien 1–1, G Moloney 0–1, J O'Brien 0–1, L Moloney 0–1, M Mullane 0–1.		E Cregan 1–1, M Graham 1–0, D Brougham 0–1, F Connolly 0–1.

=== Semi-finals ===
13 August 1978 Semi-final	South Liberties	1–08 – 2–05	Patrickswell	Bruff Grounds

20 August 1978 Semi-final	Bruree	3–13 – 2–08	Killeedy	Gaelic Grounds
	F McDonagh 1–5, P O'Brien 1–3, L Moloney 1–2, G Moloney 0–2, J Potter 0–1.		D Flynn 2–2, W Fitzmaurice 0–5, T Mulcahy 0–1.

27 August 1978 Semi-final replay	South Liberties	1–05 – 0–07	Patrickswell	Bruff Grounds
	E Grimes 0–4, J Moynihan 1–0, J McKenna 0–1.		R Bennis 0–5, F Nolan 0–2.

=== Final ===
17 September 1978 Final	South Liberties	2–09 – 2–05	Bruree	Gaelic Grounds
	J Moynihan 1–1, M Grimes 1–1, E Grimes 0–4, T Ryan 0–2, M Butler 0–1.		F McDonagh 1–2, L Moloney 1–0, G Mullane 0–2, P O'Brien 0–1.
