= 1973 Limerick Senior Hurling Championship =

Annual hurling competition season

- Dates: 28 October – 25 November 1973
- Teams: 8
- Champions: Kilmallock (3rd title); Mossie Dowling (captain)
- Runners-up: Killeedy

Tournament statistics
- Matches played: 8
- Goals scored: 29 (3.63 per match)
- Points scored: 122 (15.25 per match)
- Top scorer(s): Paudie Fitzmaurice (0–29)

The 1973 Limerick Senior Hurling Championship was the 79th staging of the Limerick Senior Hurling Championship since its establishment by the Limerick County Board in 1887. The championship ran from 28 October to 25 November 1973.

South Liberties entered the championship as the defending champions, however, they were beaten by Killeedy in the quarter-finals.

The final was played on 25 November 1973 at the Gaelic Grounds in Limerick, between Kilmallock and Killeedy, in what was their first ever meeting in the final. Kilmallock won the match by 2–12 to 2–04 to claim their third championship title overall and a first title in six years.

Killeedy's Paudie Fitzmaurice was the championship's top scorer with 0–29.

== Teams ==
Championship	Champions	Runners-up
Limerick City Senior Hurling Championship	Patrickswell	Ballybrown
East Limerick Senior Hurling Championship	South Liberties	Pallasgreen
South Limerick Senior Hurling Championship	Kilmallock	Bruff
West Limerick Senior Hurling Championship	Tournafulla	Killeedy

== Results ==
=== Quarter-finals ===
28 October 1973 Quarter-final	Killeedy	2–14 – 4–03	South Liberties	Bruff Grounds
	W Fitzmaurice 1–5, P Fitzmaurice 0–7, J Magner 1–0, Moloney 0–1, P O'Connor 0–1.		L Moynihan 2–1, D O'Sullivan 1–1, J McKenna 1–0, T Ryan 0–1.

28 October 1973 Quarter-final	Pallasgreen	3–04 – 1–04	Tournafulla	Bruff Grounds

28 October 1973 Quarter-final	Patrickswell	1–10 – 1–08	Bruff	Gaelic Grounds

28 October 1973 Quarter-final	Kilmallock	1–13 – 2–05	Ballybrown	Gaelic Grounds

=== Semi-finals ===
4 November 1973 Semi-final	Killeedy	0–13 – 3–04	Pallasgreen	FitzGerald Park
	P Fitzmaurice 0–7, W Fitzmaurice 0–5, W Cronin 0–1.		J Howard 2–1, M O'Donoghue 1–0, O Dillon 0–1, P McCarthy 0–1, D O'Dwyer 0–1.

11 November 1973 Semi-final replay	Killeedy	1–09 – 1–03	Pallasgreen	FitzGerald Park
	P Fitzmaurice 0–7, P O'Connor 1–0, PJ Cronin 0–1, M Fitzmaurice 0–1.		L Bowles 1–0, J Howard 0–1, M Power 0–1, O Dillon 0–1.

11 November 1973 Semi-final	Kilmallock	3–10 – 2–06	Patrickswell	Gaelic Grounds
	T Smith 1–3, M Finn 1–2, P Kelly 1–1, M Carroll 0–3, B Savage 0–1.		F Nolan 1–0, L Mann 1–0, S Foley 0–3, R Bennis 0–2, W Fenton 0–1.

=== Final ===
25 November 1973 Final	Kilmallock	2–12 – 2–04	Killeedy	Gaelic Grounds
	T Smith 2–4, M Dowling 0–4, P Kelly 0–3, D Connolly 0–1.		W Fitzmaurice 1–2, B Mullane 1–0, D Fitzmaurice 0–1, P O'Connor 0–1.	Referee: F Murphy (Cork)

== Championship statistics ==
=== Miscellaneous ===
- Cork County Board secretary Frank Murphy was selected as the referee for the final.
