= Jim Hogan (Limerick hurler) =

Irish hurler

Personal information
- Native name: Séamus Ó hÓgáin (Irish)
- Born: 1937 Adare, County Limerick, Ireland
- Died: 7 March 2016 (aged 79) Dooradoyle, Limerick, Ireland
- Occupation: Aer Lingus employee
- Height: 5 ft 10 in (178 cm)

Sport
- Sport: Hurling
- Position: Goalkeeper
Clubs
- Years: Club
- Adare; Sarsfields; Lees; Claughaun
Club titles
- Limerick titles: 2
Inter-county
- Years: County
- 1958-1973: Limerick
Inter-county titles
- Munster titles: 1
- All-Irelands: 1
- NHL: 1

James Hogan (1937 – 7 March 2016) was an Irish hurler who played for club sides Adare, Sarsfields and Claughaun. He was a member of the Limerick senior hurling team at various times over a 15-year period, during which time he usually lined out as a goalkeeper.

== Career ==
Hogan first appeared as a 14-year-old member of the Adare minor team in 1951. He simultaneously lined out with the Adare CBS team and was a member of the school team that was beaten by De La Salle College Waterford in the Dean Ryan Cup final in 1953. Hogan's working life brought him to Cork and it was with the Sarsfields club there that he won a County Championship title in 1957. He also lined out as a Gaelic footballer with Lees and narrowly missed out on completing the double. Hogan returned to Limerick and joined the Claughaun club, with whom he won further County Championship titles. He first appeared for the Limerick senior hurling team in the Rose Cup final in 1958 and quickly established himself as a mainstay of the team. Hogan was sub-goalkeeper on the Limerick team that beat Kilkenny in the 1973 All-Ireland final. His other honours include Munster Championship and National Hurling League medals, while he also earned selection with Munster.

== Death ==
Hogan died at University Hospital Limerick on 7 March 2016.

== Honours ==
Sarsfields

- Cork Senior Hurling Championship: 1957

Claughaun

- Limerick Senior Hurling Championship: 1958, 1968, 1971

Cork

- All-Ireland Senior Hurling Championship: 1973
- Munster Senior Hurling Championship: 1973
- National Hurling League: 1970-71

Sporting positions
Preceded by Tony O'Brien	Limerick Senior Hurling Captain; 1972	Succeeded by Éamonn Grimes
