= Paddy Kelly (hurler) =

Limerick hurler

Personal information
- Native name: Pádraig Ó Ceallaigh (Irish)
- Born: 1955 (age 70–71) Kilmallock, County Limerick, Ireland
- Occupation: Secondary school teacher
- Height: 5 ft 9 in (175 cm)

Sport
- Sport: Hurling
- Position: Left wing-forward
Club
- Years: Club
- 1973–1995: Kilmallock
Club titles
- Limerick titles: 6
- Munster titles: 2
- All-Ireland Titles: 0
College
- Years: College
- National College of PE
College titles
- Fitzgibbon titles: 0
Inter-county
| Years | County | Apps (scores) |
| 1974–1987 | Limerick | 20 (0-50) |
Inter-county titles
- Munster titles: 3
- All-Irelands: 0
- NHL: 2
- All Stars: 1

Patrick Kelly (born 1955) is an Irish hurling coach and former player. At club level, he played with Kilmallock and at inter-county level with the Limerick senior hurling team.

== Playing career ==
Kelly played hurling at all levels as a student at Charleville CBS and won consecutive Munster Colleges U16½HC titles in 1971 and 1972. He was also involved in athletics and won an All-Ireland underage title in the 880yd. Kelly later studied at the National College of Physical Education in Limerick and lined out in various inter-varsities hurling competitions.

At club level, Kelly first played for Kilmallock at juvenile and underage levels and was part of the club's minor team that won consecutive Limerick MHC titles. He was in his final year of the minor grade in 1973 when he joined Kilmallock's senior team and went on to win three consecutive Limerick SHC titles. Kelly won six Limerick SHC titles on total, while he also claimed two Munster Club SHC medals. He captained Kilmallock to a 1-17 to 2-07 defeat by Sarsfields in the 1993 All-Ireland club final.

At inter-county level, Kelly first appeared for Limerick during a two-year tenure with the minor team that lost consecutive Munster MHC finals in 1972 and 1973. He immediately progressed to the under-21 team before making his senior team debut in July 1974. Kelly was later a substitute for Limerick's defeat by Kilkenny in the 1974 All-Ireland final.

Kelly won consecutive Munster SHC medals in 1980 and 1981, while he was again a substitute for Limerick's defeat by Galway in the 1980 All-Ireland final. He was the team's top scorer when Limerick claimed consecutive National Hurling League titles in 1984 and 1985. Kelly was also honoured with an All-Star award in 1984.

Performances at inter-county level for Limerick resulted in Kelly being called up to the Munster inter-provincial team. He won a Railway Cup medal in 1985 when he was part of the Munster team that beat Connacht by 3-06 to 1-11 in the final.

== Coaching career ==
Kelly was involved in coaching at all levels in his role as a teacher at the Abbey CBS in Tipperary. He managed the school's senior team to All-Ireland Colleges SBHC titles in 1992 and 2002.

== Honours ==
=== Player ===
Charleville CBS

- Munster Colleges Under-16½ Hurling Championship: 1971, 1972

Kilmallock

- Munster Senior Club Hurling Championship: 1992 (c), 1994
- Limerick Senior Hurling Championship: 1973, 1974, 1975, 1985, 1992 (c), 1994
- South Limerick Senior Hurling Championship: 1973, 1974, 1975, 1979, 1981 (c), 1987, 1990
- Limerick Minor Hurling Championship: 1972, 1973

Limerick

- Munster Senior Hurling Championship: 1974, 1980, 1981
- National Hurling League: 1983–84, 1984–85

Munster

- Railway Cup: 1985

=== Management ===
Abbey CBS

- All-Ireland Colleges Senior B Hurling Championship: 1992, 2002

Sporting positions
| Preceded by | Limerick minor hurling team captain 1973 | Succeeded by |
| Preceded by Éamonn Grimes | Limerick senior hurling team captain 1976 | Succeeded by Éamonn Grimes |
| Preceded by Leonard Enright | Limerick senior hurling team captain 1986 | Succeeded by Danny Fitzgerald |
