= Séamus Ryan (hurler) =

Irish hurler and priest (1937–2023)

James L. "Séamus" Ryan (1937 – 11 February 2023) was an Irish priest. He was a renowned lecturer and gifted hurler who played at senior level for the Limerick county team, winning the Munster Senior Hurling Championship title in 1955, alongside his older brother Liam (who also became a priest and lecturer in sociology in Maynooth) who captained the side. Their father Willie Ryan had also played inter-county hurling.

From Cappamore, County Limerick, he went to St Patrick's College, Maynooth to study for the priesthood. At Maynooth he earned a doctorate and was ordained a priest in 1961. Fr. Seamus with the benefit of a German Government scholarship to the University of Munster in Westphalia, Germany, studied under young Professor Ratzinger later Pope Benedict.

Returning to Ireland in 1964, Ryan lectured in theology in St. Patrick's College, Thurles up until 1990 when he was appointed parish priest to St Matthews Parish, Ballyfermot Upper in Dublin. He retired as parish priest of St Matthew's in 2016, returning to his native Cappamore.

Ryan died on 11 February 2023.

== Honours ==
St. Flannan's College

- Dr. Harty Cup: 1952, 1954

Cappamore

- Limerick Senior Hurling Championship: 1954, 1956, 1959

Limerick

- Munster Senior Hurling Championship: 1955
