= 1972 Limerick Senior Hurling Championship =

Annual hurling competition season

- Dates: 1 October – 10 December 1972
- Teams: 8
- Champions: South Liberties (4th title); Éamonn Grimes (captain)
- Runners-up: Patrickswell

Tournament statistics
- Matches played: 8
- Goals scored: 47 (5.88 per match)
- Points scored: 123 (15.38 per match)
- Top scorer(s): Richie Bennis (3–10)

The 1972 Limerick Senior Hurling Championship was the 78th staging of the Limerick Senior Hurling Championship since its establishment by the Limerick County Board in 1887. The championship ran from 1 October to 10 December 1972.

Claughaun entered the championship as the defending champions, however, they were beaten by South Liberties in a semi-final replay.

The final was played on 10 December 1972 at the Gaelic Grounds in Limerick, between South Liberties and Patrickswell, in what was their first ever meeting in the final. South Liberties won the match by 4–08 to 1–05 to claim their fourth championship title overall and a first title in 82 years.

Patrickswell's Richie Bennis was the championship's top scorer with 3–10.

== Teams ==
Championship	Champions	Runners-up
Limerick City Senior Hurling Championship	Patrickswell	Claughaun
East Limerick Senior Hurling Championship	South Liberties	Ahane
South Limerick Senior Hurling Championship	Kilmallock	Garryspillane
West Limerick Senior Hurling Championship	Tournafulla	Killeedy

== Results ==
=== Quarter-finals ===
1 October 1972 Quarter-final	Claughaun	4–03 – 2–08	Kilmallock	Fr Hayes Memorial Park
	D Sheehan 1–1, E Cregan 1–0, M Graham 1–0, M Grace 1–0, L O'Sullivan 0–1, B Galligan 0–1.		J Murphy 1–5, B O'Sullivan 1–1, T Moloney 0–1, B Savage 0–1.

1 October 1972 Quarter-final	Patrickswell	3–10 – 2–10	Garryspillane	Fr Hayes Memorial Park
	R Bennis 1–2, M O'Connell 1–1, S Foley 0–4, C Jeffers 1–0, L Foley 0–2, P Bennis 0–1.		J Carroll 1–2, K Walshe 0–5, T BUrke 0–1, DP Bowler 0–1, S Bourke 0–1.

1 October 1972 Quarter-final	South Liberties	7–08 – 4–09	Killeedy	Croom Grounds
	T Ryan 2–4, E Grimes 2–1, W O'Donoghue 1–0, D O'Sullivan 1–0, J McKenna 0–1, L Grimes 0–1, M Butler 0–1.		P Fitzmaurice 2–3, J Magner 1–2, P O'Connor 1–0, W Fitzmaurice 0–2, M Fitzmaurice 0–1, N Herbert 0–1.

1 October 1972 Quarter-final	Tournafulla	4–11 – 4–03	Ahane	Croom Grounds
	P Horgan 3–0, C Brouder 1–2, P Hartnett 0–4, D O'Connor 0–3, M Hartnett 0–1, T Hartnett 0–1.		MJ Aherne 1–2, S Kelly 1–0, T Bradley 1–0, J Hassett 1–0, P Byrnes 0–1.

=== Semi-finals ===
29 October 1972 Semi-final	Patrickswell	3–09 – 2–07 (match abandoned)	Tournafulla	Croom Grounds

12 November 1972 Semi-final	South Liberties	1–07 – 1–07	Claughaun	Bruff Grounds
	E Dooley 1–0, T Ryan 0–2, E Grimes 0–2, M Shanahan 0–2, M Butler 0–1.		M Grace 1–0, E Tuohy 0–3, R Grace 0–3, D Sheehan 0–1.

20 November 1972 Semi-final replay	Patrickswell	7–10 – 0–05	Tournafulla	Gaelic Grounds
	L Mann 2–1, R Bennis 1–4, S Foley 2–0, Peter Bennis 1–2, C Jeffers 1–1, L Foley 0–2.		D O'Connor 0–4, Patsy Hartnett 0–1.

26 November 1972 Semi-final replay	South Liberties	2–11 – 1–08	Claughaun	Bruff Grounds
	E Grimes 0–4, M Shanahan 1–0, W O'Donoghue 1–0, J McKenna 0–3, M Butler 0–3, T Ryan 0–1.		D Sheehan 1–1, M Grace 0–2, R Grace 0–2, L Moloney 0–2, E Touhy 0–1.

=== Final ===
10 December 1972 Final	South Liberties	4–08 – 1–05	Patrickswell	Gaelic Grounds
	J McKenna 1–2, M Shanahan 1–0, W O'Donoghue 1–0, E Dooley 1–0, E Grimes 0–3, T Ryan 0–2, M Butler 0–1.		R Bennis 1–4, L Foley 0–1.

== Championship statistics ==
=== Top scorers ===
Rank	Player	Club	Tally	Total	Matches	Average
1	Richie Bennis	Patrickswell	3–10	19	3	6.33
2	Éamonn Grimes	South Liberties	2–10	16	4	4.00
3	Tom Ryan	South Liberties	2–09	15	4	3.75
4	Seán Foley	Patrickswell	2–04	10	3	3.33
5	Patsy Horgan	Ahane	3–00	9	2	4.50
5	Paudie Fitzmaurice	Killeedy	2–03	9	1	9.00
5	Joe McKenna	South Liberties	1–06	9	4	2.25
