= 2014 Limerick Senior Hurling Championship =

Annual hurling competition season

- Dates: 2 May – 19 October 2014
- Teams: 12
- Sponsor: Q3 Security
- Champions: Kilmallock (11th title); Graeme Mulcahy (captain); Ger O'Loughlin (manager)
- Runners-up: Na Piarsaigh; Mike Casey (captain); Shane O'Neill (manager)
- Relegated: Granagh-Ballingarry; Knockainey

Tournament statistics
- Matches played: 35
- Goals scored: 88 (2.51 per match)
- Points scored: 1049 (29.97 per match)
- Top scorer(s): Niall Moran (1–54)

The 2014 Limerick Senior Hurling Championship was the 120th staging of the Limerick Senior Hurling Championship since its establishment by the Limerick County Board in 1887. The championship ran from 2 May to 19 October 2014.

Na Piarsaigh entered the championship as the defending champions.

The final was played on 19 October 2014 at the Gaelic Grounds in Limerick, between Kilmallock and Na Piarsaigh, in what was their second meeting in the championship that year, having already played each other in the group stage, but their first ever meeting in the final. Kilmallock won the match by 1–15 to 0–14 to claim their 11th championship title overall and a first title in two years.

Ahane's Niall Moran was the championship's top scorer with 1–54.

== Teams ==
=== Overview ===
A major restructuring of the Limerick Senior Hurling Championship at the end of 2013 resulted in the number of participating teams for 2014 being reduced from sixteen to twelve. Because of this Garryspillane, Bruree, Hospital-Herbertstown and Croom regraded to the newly created Limerick Premier Intermediate Hurling Championship for 2014.

== Group 1 ==
=== Group 1 table ===
Pos	Team	Pld	W	D	L	For	Ag.	Diff.	Pts.
1	Doon	5	5	0	0	113	81	32	10
2	Adare	5	3	0	2	108	93	15	6
3	Ahane	5	3	0	2	94	94	0	6
4	Patrickswell	5	2	0	3	99	92	7	4
5	Murroe-Boher	5	1	0	4	90	99	−9	2
6	Knockainey	5	1	0	4	72	117	−45	2

=== Group 1 results ===
2 May 2014 Round 1	Murroe-Boher	1–16 – 1–07	Knockainey	Fr Hayes Memorial Park
	S Tobin 0–9, P Tobin 1–2, M Ryan 0–3, K Tobin 0–1, D Kennedy 0–1.		M Cleary 1–0, K Cleary 0–2, N Finch 0–1, D Walsh 0–1, L O'Shea 0–1, J Lonergan 0–1, P Barron 0–1.

3 May 2014 Round 1	Adare	0–10 – 1–15	Doon	FitzGerald Park
	D Hannon 0–9, D Sexton 0–1.		M Ryan 1–5, C McNamara 0–4, M Fitzgerald 0–2, M Barry 0–2, D O'Donovan 0–1, R Ryan 0–1.

4 May 2014 Round 1	Ahane	1–20 – 1–19	Patrickswell	Bruff Grounds
	N Moran 0–14, R Ryan 1–2, D Morrissey 0–2, T Morrissey 0–2.		J Kelleher 0–6, L Considine 0–5, J Moran 1–0, T O'Brien 0–3, K O'Brien 0–2, E McNamara 0–1, M Carmody 0–1, S O'Brien 0–1.

9 May 2014 Round 1	Adare	1–20 – 1–16	Murroe/Boher	Clarina Grounds
	D Hannon 0–8, W Griffin 1–2, J Fitzgibbon 0–5, D Sexton 0–2, C McCarthy 0–2, L Costello 0–1.		S Tobin 1–12, M Ryan 0–1, P Tobin 0–1, C Byrnes 0–1, D Kennedy 0–1.

10 May 2014 Round 1	Knockainey	1–07 – 1–13	Patrickswell	Childers Road
	K Cleary 0–4, D Madden 1–0, J Lonergan 0–1, N Finch 0–1, L O'Shea 0–1.		J Kelleher 1–2, B Murray 0–4, M Carmody 0–3, S O'Brien 0–1, L Considine 0–1, T O'Brien 0–1, A Gillane 0–1.

11 May 2014 Round 1	Doon	2–13 – 1–10	Ahane	Fr Hayes Memorial Park
	M Ryan 2–3, M Fitzgerald 0–4, N Maher 0–2, C McNamara 0–2, D Coleman 0–1, G McPartland 0–1.		T Morrissey 1–2, N Moran 0–4, P O'Halloran 0–2, D Morrissey 0–1, J Meskell 0–1.

13 June 2014 Round 3	Ahane	1–17 – 0–15	Murroe/Boher	Gaelic Grounds
	N Moran 0–7, R Ryan 1–3, T Morrissey 0–4, D Morrissey 0–1, M Carr 0–1, P O'Halloran 0–1.		S Tobin 0–8, K Tobin 0–3, P Tobin 0–1, D Kennedy 0–1, S Hickey 0–1, D Sheehan 0–1.

13 June 2014 Round 3	Doon	0–21 – 3–11	Patrickswell	Gaelic Grounds
	M Ryan 0–7, C McNamara 0–4, G McPartland 0–3, N Maher 0–2, G Allis 0–2, D Coleman 0–2, R English 0–1.		J Kelleher 0–6, K O'Brien 1–1, C Lynch 1–0, D Byrnes 1–0, L Considine 0–2, E McNamara 0–1, J Mann 0–1.

14 June 2014 Round 3	Adare	3–22 – 1–14	Knockainey	Moneteen Grounds
	W Griffin 2–3, D Hannon 0–9, L O'Brien 1–1, J Fitzgibbon 0–3, D Sexton 0–2, C McCarthy 0–2, P Keane 0–1, M Mackey 0–1.		D Walsh 0–7, P Barron 1–3, J Lonergan 0–2, L O'Shea 0–1, S Lonergan 0–1.

19 August 2014 Round 4	Adare	1–15 – 1–16	Ahane	Gaelic Grounds
	L O'Brien 1–2, W Griffin 0–5, J Fitzgibbon 0–3, D Hannon 0–2, D Sheehan 0–1, M Mackey 0–1, D Sexton 0–1.		N Moran 0–10, P Morrissey 1–0, T Morrissey 0–3, J Meskell 0–1, K Enright 0–1.

19 August 2014 Round 4	Doon	4–18 – 1–12	Knockainey	Fr Hayes Memorial Park
	D O'Donovan 2–6, M Ryan 1–6, G Allis 1–0, D Coleman 0–2, P Ryan 0–1, D Moloney 0–1, N Maher 0–1, G McPartland 0–1.		M Cleary 1–2, D Walsh 0–5, M Ryan 0–3, P Barron 0–2.

19 August 2014 Round 4	Murroe/Boher	0–12 – 2–16	Patrickswell	Gaelic Grounds
	S Tobin 0–7, D Sheehan 0–2, C Byrnes 0–1, D Kennedy 0–1, K Tobin 0–1.		T O'Brien 1–3, K O'Brien 1–0, C Lynch 0–3, L Considine 0–3, D Byrnes 0–3, P Howard 0–2, A Gillane 0–1, J Mann 0–1.

28 August 2014 Round 5	Ahane	2–13 – 2–14	Knockainey	Bruff Grounds
	N Moran 0–8, R Ryan 1–1, P O'Halloran 1–1, S Madden 0–1, M Carr 0–1, K Enright 0–1.		P Kirby 1–4, S Lonergan 1–2, J Lonergan 0–2, D Walsh 0–2, C Madden 0–2, M Ryan 0–1, N Finch 0–1.

12 September 2014 Round 5	Doon	2–18 – 2–17	Murroe-Boher	Cappamore

13 September 2014 Round 5	Adare	2–20 – 3–11	Patrickswell	Gaelic Grounds
	W Griffin 0–8, L O'Brien 1–3, M Mackey 1–0, D Sheehan 0–3, J Fitzgibbon 0–2, D Hannon 0–2, J Hannon 0–1, W McNamara 0–1.		D Byrnes 1–3, T O'Brien 1–3, K O'Brien 1–0, L Considine 0–2, J Kelleher 0–1, E McNamara 0–1, P Howard 0–1.

== Group 2 ==
=== Group 2 table ===
Pos	Team	Pld	W	D	L	For	Ag.	Diff.	Pts.
1	Na Piarsaigh	5	5	0	0	117	83	34	10
2	Kilmallock	5	4	0	1	105	77	28	8
3	South Liberties	5	2	0	3	79	90	−11	4
4	Effin	5	2	0	3	69	82	−13	4
5	Ballybrown	5	1	0	4	78	99	−21	2
6	Granagh-Ballingarry	5	1	0	4	91	108	−17	2

=== Group 2 results ===
2 May 2014 Round 1	Effin	0–08 – 2–15	South Liberties	Fr Hayes Memorial Park
	T Quaid 0–3, T Rea 0–2, N Quaid 0–2, H O'Neill 0–1.		C Carberry 2–2, M Keane 0–6, B Nash 0–3, T Ryan 0–2, W Hickey 0–1, D O'Neill 0–1.

3 May 2014 Round 1	Ballybrown	1–20 – 1–13	Granagh-Ballingarry	Mick Neville Park
	A O'Connor 0–11, D Byrnes 1–1, D Hall 0–4, B Griffin 0–3, P McGrath 0–1.		D O'Connor 0–11, N Kennedy 1–1, D O'Grady 0–1.

4 May 2014 Round 1	Na Piarsaigh	2–20 – 1–11	Kilmallock	Bruff Grounds
	S Dowling 0–7, K Downes 1–3, R Lynch 0–4, K Ryan 1–0, A Dempsey 0–2, W O'Donoghue 0–2, P Gleeson 0–1, A Hennessy 0–1.		E Ryan 0–5, G O'Mahony 1–1, K O'Donnell 0–2, R Egan 0–1, G Mulcahy 0–1, P O'Brien 0–1.

10 May 2014 Round 1	Effin	1–12 – 0–07	Ballybrown	FitzGerald Park
	T Quaid 1–6, N Quaid 0–2, D Sheehy 0–2, P Carroll 0–1, T Rea 0–1.		A O'Connor 0–3, D Kenny 0–1, S Kenny 0–1, D Byrnes 0–1, R Griffin 0–1.

10 May 2014 Round 1	Na Piarsaigh	1–13 – 0–12	South Liberties	Childers Road
	R Lynch 0–9, W O'Donoghue 1–2, S Dowling 0–1, D Dempsey 0–1.		M Keane 0–7, B Nash 0–3, T Ryan 0–1, S Kilcoyne 0–1.

11 May 2014 Round 1	Kilmallock	1–21 – 2–10	Granagh-Ballingarry	Dromcollogher Grounds
	G Mulcahy 1–5, G O'Mahony 0–4, J Mulcahy 0–3, E Ryan 0–3, R Egan 0–2, P O'Brien 0–2, A Costelloe 0–1, L Walsh 0–1.		D O'Connor 0–8, D Condron 1–1, D O'Grady 1–0, T O'Donovan 0–1.

13 June 2014 Round 3	South Liberties	2–13 – 1–18	Granagh-Ballingarry	Bruff Grounds
	M Keane 0–7, C Carberry 1–1, W Hickey 1–0, B Nash 0–2, T Ryan 0–2, S O'Neill 0–1.		D O'Connor 0–10, N Kennedy 1–6, B Hanley 0–1, E Kennedy 0–1.

14 June 2014 Round 3	Na Piarsaigh	2–17 – 2–10	Effin	Bruff Grounds
	S Dowling 0–7, K Downes 1–2, D Dempsey 1–1, A Dempsey 0–2, W O'Donoghue 0–2, P Gleeson 0–1, A Breen 0–1, M Foley 0–1.		T Quaid 2–6, S O'Neill 0–2, T Rea 0–1, J Dillon 0–1.

15 June 2014 Round 3	Ballybrown	0–13 – 0–23	Kilmallock	Newcastle West Grounds
	A O'Connor 0–5, B Griffin 0–3, S Kenny 0–2, D Hall 0–2, R Griffin 0–1.		E Ryan 0–8, P O'Brien 0–4, G O'Mahony 0–3, B O'Sullivan 0–3, R Egan 0–2, G Mulcahy 0–1, J Mulcahy 0–1, B Burke 0–1.

15 August 2014 Round 4	Kilmallock	0–17 – 0–14	Effin	Michael Fox Park
	E Ryan 0–10, R Egan 0–3, P O'Brien 0–1, G O'Mahony 0–1, G Mulcahy 0–1, L Walsh 0–1.		T Quaid 0–8, J Dillon 0–2, J Quaid 0–1, D Sheehy 0–1, H O'Neill 0–1, E Kiely 0–1.

19 August 2014 Round 4	Na Piarsaigh	2–20 – 2–18	Granagh-Ballingarry	Páirc na nGael
	S Dowling 0–8, R Lynch 0–6, K Downes 1–2, D Dempsey 1–1, W O'Donoghue 0–1, A Breen 0–1, A Dempsey 0–1.		D O'Connor 0–10, D O'Donovan 1–2, E Kennedy 1–1, T O'Donovan 0–3, D O'Grady 0–1, D Condron 0–1.

19 August 2014 Round 4	South Liberties	2–13 – 0–18	Ballybrown	Childers Road
	W Hickey 1–3, C Carberry 0–4, S O'Neill 1–0, M Keane 0–2, B Nash 0–2, T Ryan 0–1, D O'Neill 0–1.		A O'Connor 0–14, L Doolan 0–2, B Griffin 0–2.

13 September 2014 Round 5	Granagh-Ballingarry	0–14 – 2–10	Effin	Ballyagran
	D O'Connor 0–3, E Kennedy 0–2, N Kennedy 0–2, D Condron 0–2, E Chawke 0–2, C O'Keeffe 0–1, T Davoren 0–1, D O'Grady 0–1.		H O'Neill 1–1, J O'Leary 1–1, D Sheehy 0–3, N Quaid 0–2, T Rea 0–1, T Quaid 0–1, M Rea 0–1.

13 September 2014 Round 5	Na Piarsaigh	3–17 – 2–11	Ballybrown	Gaelic Grounds
	S Dowling 1–9, K Downes 1–2, A Breen 1–1, A Demspey 0–2, R Lynch 0–2, D Dempsey 0–1.		A O'Connor 2–4, R Kenny 0–2, S O'Reilly 0–1, D Byrnes 0–1, B Griffin 0–1, M Kiely 0–1, S Kenny 0–1.

13 September 2014 Round 5	Kilmallock	1–23 – 0–08	South Liberties	Bruff Grounds
	G Mulcahy 1–3, E Ryan 0–6, P O'Brien 0–4, R Egan 0–4, B Burke 0–2, G O'Mahony 0–2, C Barry 0–1, J Mulcahy 0–1.		C Carberry 0–5, W Hickey 0–1, T Ryan 0–1, D Garry 0–1.

== Knockout stage ==
=== Quarter-finals ===
20 September 2014 Quarter-final	Kilmallock	0–24 – 2–16	Adare	Gaelic Grounds
	E Ryan 0–7, G Mulcahy 0–3, B O'Sullivan 0–3, R Egan 0–3, J Mulcahy 0–2, P O'Brien 0–2, L Walsh 0–2, R Hanley 0–2.		W Griffin 1–6, D Hannon 1–3, D Sexton 0–3, J Fitzgibbon 0–2, J Hannon 0–1, L O'Brien 0–1.

20 September 2014 Quarter-final	Ahane	4–18 – 2–13	South Liberties	Gaelic Grounds
	N Moran 1–9, K Enright 1–4, S Madden 1–1, T Morrissey 1–0, D Morrissey 0–1, M Foley 0–1, R Ryan 0–1, F Ahern 0–1.		B Nash 2–6, W Hickey 0–3, C Carbery 0–2, D Garry 0–1.

=== Semi-final ===
5 October 2014 Semi-final	Doon	0–16 – 0–18	Kilmallock	Gaelic Grounds
13:45	B Murphy 0–3, D Coleman 0–3, D O'Donovan 0–2, N Maher 0–2, C McNamara 0–2, G McParland 0–1, P Ryan 0–1, M Fitzgerald 0–1, M Barry 0–1.		E Ryan 0–7, G Mulcahy 0–3, J Mulcahy 0–3, R Egan 0–2, P O'Brien 0–1, K O'Donnell 0–1, R Hanley 0–1.	Referee: D O'Driscoll

5 October 2014 Semi-final	Na Piarsaigh	4–20 – 0–08	Ahane	Gaelic Grounds
15:30	S Dowling 2–6, A Breen 2–3, J O'Brien 0–3, D Dempsey 0–2, R Lynch 0–2, K Ryan 0–1, P Gleeson 0–1, W O'Donoghue 0–1, A Hennessy 0–1.		T Morrissey 0–2, N Moran 0–2, P O'Halloran 0–1, K Enright 0–1, R Ryan 0–1, F Ahern 0–1.	Referee: R Moloney

=== Final ===
19 October 2014 Final	Kilmallock	1–15 – 0–14	Na Piarsaigh	Gaelic Grounds
15:30	E Ryan 1–4 (0-4f), G Mulcahy 0–4, K O’Donnell & G O’Mahony 0–3 each, R Egan 0–1.	Report	S Dowling 0–4 (2f), R Lynch (1 sl, 1 65), K Downes & A Breen 0–2 each, D Breen, A Dempsey, D Dempsey & W O’Donoghue 0–1 each.	Referee: J Mullins

== Championship statistics ==
=== Top scorers ===
Rank	Player	Club	Tally	Total	Matches	Average
1	Niall Moran	Ahane	1–54	57	7	8.14
2	Eoin Ryan	Kilmallock	1–50	53	8	6.62
3	Shane Dowling	Na Piarsaigh	3–42	51	7	7.28
