= 2015 All-Ireland Senior Club Hurling Championship final =

2015 All-Ireland Senior Club Hurling Championship Final
- Event: 2014–15 All-Ireland Senior Club Hurling Championship
Ballyhale Shamrocks	Kilmallock
1-18	1-6
- Date: 17 March 2015
- Venue: Croke Park, Dublin
- Man of the Match: Joey Holden
- Referee: James Owens (Wexford)
- Attendance: 29,752

The 2015 All-Ireland Senior Club Hurling Championship final was a hurling match played at Croke Park on 17 March 2015 to determine the winners of the 2014–15 All-Ireland Senior Club Hurling Championship, the 45th season of the All-Ireland Senior Club Hurling Championship, a tournament organised by the Gaelic Athletic Association for the champion clubs of the four provinces of Ireland. The final was contested by Ballyhale Shamrocks of Kilkenny and Kilmallock of Limerick, with Ballyhale Shamrocks winning by 1-18 to 1-6.

The All-Ireland final between Ballyhale Shamrocks and Kilmallock was a unique occasion as it was the first ever championship meeting between the two teams. Ballyhale Shamrocks were appearing in their third final in a decade, while Kilmallock were lining out in their second All-Ireland decider ever and their first since 1993.

It was an evenly contested game for most of the first half, but missed opportunities cost Kilmallock dear. They shot 10 first-half wides in total, with Paudie O'Brien, who opened their scoring early on, going on to shoot four wides. Ballyhale were much more efficient when attacking, and Colin Fennelly opened his account before Eoin Reid pointed to put them 0-6 to 0-3 ahead. Fennelly's 27th-minute goal put serious daylight between them for the first time. T. J. Reid added another free on the stroke of half-time to leave the Leinster champions with a healthy 1-7 to 0-4 advantage.

In the second half Kilmallock failed to score a point from play. In contrast, Ballyhale added another 11 points to their tally and corner-back Alan Cuddihy even got on the scoresheet with captain T. J. Reid tallying 0-6 and describing the win as "a dream come true" in his victory speech.

Ballyhale's All-Ireland victory was their first since 2010. The win gave them their sixth All-Ireland title over all and put them as outright leaders on the all-time roll of honour.

Kilmallock's All-Ireland defeat was their second ever. They remain a team who has contested All-Ireland deciders but has never claimed the ultimate prize.

== Match ==
=== Details ===
17 March 2015
14:00

Ballyhale Shamrocks	1-18 - 1-6	Kilmallock
TJ Reid 0-6 (4fs), C Fennelly 1-3, E Reid 0-3, H Shefflin, M Aylward 0-2 each, B Aylward, A Cuddihy 0-1 each.	Report	R Hanley 1-0, E Ryan 0-3 (3fs), R Egan, P O'Brien, G Mulcahy all 0-1 each.

Croke Park, Dublin
Attendance: 29,752
Referee: J Owens (Wexford)

Ballyhale Shamrocks	Kilmallock
