= Aaron Costello =

Irish hurler (born 1992)

Personal information
- Native name: Aron Mac Coisteala (Irish)
- Born: 4 July 1992 (age 34) Kilmallock, County Limerick, Ireland

Sport
- Sport: Hurling
- Position: Left corner-back
Club
- Years: Club
- Kilmallock
Club titles
- Limerick titles: 3
- Munster titles: 1
- All-Ireland Titles: 0
College
- Years: College
- University College Cork
College titles
- Fitzgibbon titles: 0
Inter-county*
Years	County	Apps (scores)
2018-present	Limerick	1 (0-00)
Inter-county titles
- Munster titles: 5
- All-Irelands: 4
- NHL: 3
- All Stars: 0
- *Inter County team apps and scores correct as of 19:56, 23 July 2023.

Aaron Costello (born 4 July 1992) is an Irish hurler who plays for Limerick Senior Championship club Kilmallock and at inter-county level with the Limerick senior hurling team. He usually lines out as a left corner-back.

== Playing career ==
=== University College Cork ===
As a student at University College Cork, Costello also became involved in Gaelic games. On 8 March 2012, he came on as a 16th-minute substitute to win an All-Ireland Freshers Championship medal following a 0–24 to 3–11 defeat of the University of Limerick in the final.

=== Kilmallock ===
Costllo joined the Kilmallock club at a young age and played in all grades at juvenile and underage levels, enjoying championship success in the minor and under-21 grades before eventually joining the club's senior team.

On 7 October 2012, Costello was named on the bench when Kilmallock faced Adare in the Limerick Senior Championship final. He remained on the bench for the entire game but collected a winners' medal following the -15 to 0–15 victory.

On 19 October 2014, Costello won his first championship medal on the field of play following a 1–15 to 0–14 defeat of reigning champions Na Piarsaigh in the final. He later won a Munster Championship medal on 23 November 2014 following a 1–32 to 3-18 extra-time defeat of Cratloe. On 17 March 2015, Costello was at left corner-back when Kilmallock suffered a 1–18 to 1–06 defeat by Ballyhale Shamrocks in the All-Ireland final at Croke Park.

=== Limerick ===
==== Senior ====
On 14 December 2018, Costello was included on John Kiely's first Limerick squad for the 2019 season. He made his first appearance for the team on 20 December 2018 when he came on as a 48th-minute substitute for Lorcan Lyons in Limerick's 4–14 to 0–11 defeat of Kerry in the Munster League. On 9 March 2019, Costello made his first appearance in the National League when he came on as a half-time substitute for Tom Condon in the 2–22 to 0–11 defeat Laois. On 31 March 2019, he was a member of the extended panel when Limerick defeated Waterford by 1–24 to 0–10 to win the National League title. On 30 June 2019, Costello won a Munster Championship medal as a non-playing substitute following Limerick's 2–26 to 2–14 defeat of Tipperary in the final.

== Career statistics ==
As of match played 23 March 2024.

Team	Year	National League			Munster		All-Ireland		Total	
Team	Year	Division	Apps	Score	Apps	Score	Apps	Score	Apps	Score
Limerick	2019	Division 1A	1	0-00	0	0-00	0	0-00	1	0-00
Limerick	2020	Division 1A	4	0-00	0	0-00	0	0-00	4	0-00
Limerick	2021	Division 1A	3	0-00	0	0-00	0	0-00	3	0-00
	2022		1	0-00	0	0-00	0	0-00	1	0-00
	2023		2	0-00	0	0-00	1	0-00	3	0-00
	2024		5	0-00	0	0-00	0	0-00	5	0-00
Career total			16	0-00	0	0-00	1	0-00	17	0-00

== Honours ==
University College Cork

- All-Ireland Freshers' Hurling Championship (1): 2012

Kilmallock

- Munster Senior Club Hurling Championship (1): 2014
- Limerick Senior Hurling Championship (2): 2012, 2014

Limerick

- All-Ireland Senior Hurling Championship (3): 2020, 2021, 2022
- Munster Senior Hurling Championship (5): 2019, 2020, 2021, 2022, 2023
- Munster Senior Hurling League (3): 2019, 2020, 2023
