= Pat Hartigan =

Limerick hurler and Gaelic footballer

Personal information
- Native name: Pádraig Ó hArtagáin (Irish)
- Born: 20 August 1950 (age 76) Drombanna, County Limerick

Sport
- Sport: Hurling
- Position: Full-back
Club
- Years: Club
- South Liberties
Club titles
- Limerick titles: 3
Inter-county
Years	County	Apps (scores)
1968–1981	Limerick	25 (0–00)
Inter-county titles
- Munster titles: 4
- All-Irelands: 1
- All Stars: 5

Pat Hartigan (born 1950) is an Irish former hurler who played for his local club South Liberties and at senior level for the Limerick county team in the 1970s. He is regarded as one of Limerick's greatest-ever players.

== Early and private life ==
Pat Hartigan was born in Drombanna, County Limerick in 1950. He was educated locally and from an early age he showed a great interest in the game of hurling, learning his skills on the roads and in the fields of his local parish where his reputation as a skilful hurler was built. It was only when Hartigan attended the Sexton Street school of the Christian Brothers, where one of his friends was J.P. McManus, that he began to play hurling on a competitive basis. By the age of 15 Hartigan had White Cup (under fifteen and a half) and Dean Ryan Cup (Munster junior colleges) medals to his name and had broken onto the schools Harty Cup panel. In 1966 his school won a third successive Harty Cup and All-Ireland colleges' title, beating St Mary's of Galway. In 1967, after a fourth consecutive Harty Cup title was claimed, a number of the team decided to repeat the school year and attempt to capture an elusive fifth consecutive title. The prospect of making history became an obsession for Hartigan; however, his team were eventually beaten by Coláiste Chríost Rí of Cork.

Hartigan currently works as a nationals sales manager with Grasslands Irl. Ltd.

== Playing career ==
=== Club ===
Hartigan played his club hurling with the famous South Liberties club in Limerick. He enjoyed some success at underage levels before winning a senior county championship title in 1972. It was the club's first county title since 1890. Hartigan won further county victories in 1976 and 1979.

=== Inter-county ===
Hartigan's hurling success in secondary school brought him to the attention of the Limerick inter-county selectors. He made history in 1968 when he played on eight different Limerick teams in the space of six months - minor, under-21 and senior in hurling and Gaelic football, as well as intermediate in hurling and junior in football. Hartigan spent a record six years playing with the Limerick under-21 hurling team before quickly establishing himself on the senior hurling and football teams. In 1971 he first tasted success when he won a National Hurling League medal. It was the first of five successive National League final appearances for Limerick; however, they only ended up successful on one occasion.

In spite of a lack of championship success Hartigan was named in the full-back position on the inaugural All-Star team. It was the first of five successive All-Star awards for him. In the 1970s Limerick also contested five Munster finals, with victory coming first in 1973. That year Hartigan later claimed his first, and only, All-Ireland medal when Limerick had a great victory over Kilkenny. While Hartigan played at full-back his brother, Bernie, played in the half-forward line. In 1974 the Hartigan's won a second Munster title; however, Limerick were later defeated by Kilkenny in the All-Ireland final. The following few years proved frustrating for Limerick as Cork dominated the Munster championship.

In a training session with Limerick in 1979 Hartigan was tragically injured when the sliothar spun awkwardly off a hurley and hit him in the eye. The whole incident left him blind in one eye and effectively ended his inter-county hurling career. He remained on the panel for the All-Ireland final of 1980 and the All-Ireland semi-final of 1981; however, victory went to Galway and Offaly on both occasions.

== Athletics ==
As well as having a successful career at Gaelic games Hartigan had a great shot-putt career for Ireland. Without any specialised training Hartigan captained Limerick AC in 1983 to a national track and field league title, before adding a second in 1985. He later went on to represent Ireland in the European club championships. In the mid-1960s Hartigan was offered a sporting scholarship to Boston; however, he declined in favour of playing Gaelic games with his native-county.

== Retirement ==
In retirement from hurling and athletics Hartigan maintained a keen interest in both. He won the Poc Fada competition in 1981 and 1983 and also spent a period as manager of his local underage teams in the South Liberties club.

In May 2020, the Irish Independent named Hartigan at number twelve in its "Top 20 hurlers in Ireland over the past 50 years".

== Honours ==
CBS Sexton Street

- Dr Croke Cup: 1966
- Dr Harty Cup: 1965, 1966, 1967

South Liberties

- Limerick Senior Hurling Championship: 1972, 1976, 1979

Limerick

- All-Ireland Senior Hurling Championship: 1973
- Munster Senior Hurling Championship: 1973, 1974, 1980, 1981
- National Hurling League: 1970–71

Munster

- Railway Cup: 1976, 1978

Sporting positions
Preceded by Seán Foley	Limerick Senior Hurling Captain; 1979	Succeeded by Seán Foley
