= 1960 Limerick Senior Hurling Championship =

Annual hurling competition season

- Champions: Kilmallock (1st title); Tom O'Donnell (captain)
- Runners-up: Claughaun

The 1960 Limerick Senior Hurling Championship was the 66th staging of the Limerick Senior Hurling Championship since its establishment by the Limerick County Board.

Cappamore were the defending champions.

On 11 September 1960, Kilmallock won the championship after a 4–05 to 0–04 defeat of Claughaun in the final. It was their first ever championship title.

== Results ==
=== Final ===
11 September 1960 Final	Kilmallock	4–05 – 0–04	Claughaun	Gaelic Grounds, Limerick
