= 1974 Limerick Senior Hurling Championship =

Annual hurling competition season

- Dates: 15 September – 17 November 1974
- Teams: 8
- Champions: Kilmallock (4th title); Tony Moloney (captain)
- Runners-up: Patrickswell

Tournament statistics
- Matches played: 8
- Goals scored: 32 (4 per match)
- Points scored: 127 (15.88 per match)

The 1974 Limerick Senior Hurling Championship was the 80th staging of the Limerick Senior Hurling Championship since its establishment by the Limerick County Board in 1887. The championship ran from 5 September to 17 November 1974.

Kilmallock entered the championship as the defending champions.

The final was played on 17 November 1974 at the Gaelic Grounds in Limerick, between Kilmallock and Patrickswell, in what was their second meeting in the final overall and a first meeting in the final in five years. Kilmallock won the match by 2–09 to 3–05 to claim their fourth championship title overall and a second title in succession.

== Teams ==
| Championship | Champions | Runners-up |
|---|---|---|
| Limerick City Senior Hurling Championship | Patrickswell | Old Christians |
| East Limerick Senior Hurling Championship | Doon | Pallasgreen |
| South Limerick Senior Hurling Championship | Kilmallock | Bruff |
| West Limerick Senior Hurling Championship | Killeedy | Adare |

== Results ==
=== Quarter-finals ===
| 15 September 1974 Quarter-final | Kilmallock | 2–14 – 1–08 | Old Christians | Bruff Grounds |
| | T Smith 1–8, D O'Riordan 1–0, M Finn 0–1, J O'Keeffe 0–1, P Kelly 0–1, T Moloney 0–1, M Carroll 0–1, B Savage 0–1. | | D Brougha, 1–1, M Ruth 0–4, M Hennessy 0–1, P Keogh 0–1, S O'Grady 0–1. |

| 6 October 1974 Quarter-final | Patrickswell | 1–14 – 3–02 | Bruff | Páirc na nGael |

| 13 October 1974 Quarter-final | Killeedy | 2–10 – 2–06 | Pallasgreen | Bruff Grounds |
| | P Fitzmaurice 0–9, M Shiels 2–1. | | J Ryan 2–0, P Hayes 0–3, B Carr 0–1, J Franklin 0–1, B Hayes 0–1. |

| 13 October 1974 Quarter-final | Adare | 1–14 – 2–11 | Doon | Bruff Grounds |
| | T Reidy 0–7, T Howard 1–2, B Flynn 0–4, G Reidy 0–1. | | J McLoughlin 2–0, J Quinlan 0–6, R Ryan 0–3, J Cummins 0–1, B Butler 0–1. |

| 20 October 1974 Quarter-final replay | Adare | 2–07 – 2–05 | Doon | Bruff Grounds |

=== Semi-finals ===
| 28 October 1974 Semi-final | Kilmallock | 3–06 – 2–05 | Killeedy | Dromcollogher Grounds |
| | T Smith 1–5, M Dowling 1–0, B Savage 1–0, P Kelly 0–1. | | D Flynn 2–0, P Fitzmaurice 0–3, W Cronin 0–1, J Shiels 0–1. |

| 3 November 1974 Semi-final | Patrickswell | 3–08 – 1–03 | Adare | Fitzgerald Park |
| | R Bennis 1–6, J Shiels 2–0, F Nolan 0–2. | | M Burke 1–0, T Reidy 0–1, T Howard 0–1, G Shire 0–1. |

=== Final ===
| 17 November 1974 Final | Kilmallock | 2–09 – 3–05 | Patrickswell | Gaelic Grounds |
| | T Smith 0–5, B Savage 1–1, J O'Keeffe 1–0, M Carroll 0–1, P Kelly 0–1, T Moloney 0–1. | | R Bennis 2–3, D Punch 1–0, F Nolan 0–1, S Foley 0–1, J Shiels 0–1. |
