= Mike Galligan =

Irish hurler and Gaelic footballer

Personal information
- Native name: Mícheál Ó Gealagáin (Irish)
- Born: 17 January 1968 (age 58) Fairhill, Cork, Ireland
- Occupation: Technical operator
- Height: 5 ft 10 in (178 cm)

Sport
- Sport: Hurling
- Position: Left wing-forward
Club
- Years: Club
- 1986-2010: Claughaun
Club titles
- Limerick titles: 0
Inter-county
- Years: County
- 1989-2000: Limerick
Inter-county titles
- Munster titles: 2
- All-Irelands: 0
- NHL: 2
- All Stars: 0

Michael Galligan (born 17 January 1968) is an Irish hurler who played for club side Claughaun and at inter-county level with the Limerick senior hurling team.

== Career ==
Galligan first played competitive hurling at primary school in Caherdavin before lining out for CBS Sexton Street team in the Dr. Harty Cup. His early club career with CLaughaun yielded county championship titles in every juvenile and underage grade before winning his only County Championship title at senior level in 1986. Galligan's first inter-county experience came during a two-year spell with the Limerick minor team, which was followed by two seasons with the under-21 team. He made his senior debut against Kilkenny during the 1989–90 league. Galligan was a stalwart of the team for much of the following decade and was included on the Limerick teams that lost the All-Ireland finals in 1994 and 1996. His career honours include two Munster Championship medals, two National League titles and a Railway Cup medal with Munster. Galligan retired from inter-county hurling in December 2000.

== Personal life ==
Galligan was born in Cork but was raised in Limerick after his family relocated there shortly after he was born. His father, Billy Galligan, won a Cork County Championship title with Blackrock in 1961 and also lined out with the Cork senior hurling team. Galligan's uncle, Tommy Joy, was a prominent player with London Irish rugby union team.

== Honours ==
Claughaun

- Limerick Senior Hurling Championship: 1986

Limerick

- Munster Senior Hurling Championship: 1994, 1996
- National Hurling League: 1991-92, 1997
