= Willie Ryan (Limerick hurler) =

Irish hurler

Personal information
- Native name: Liam Ó Riain (Irish)
- Born: 11 November 1894 Cappamore, County Limerick, Ireland
- Died: 16 July 1969 (aged 74) Cappamore, County Limerick, Ireland
- Occupation: Farmer

Sport
- Sport: Hurling
- Position: Right wing-forward
Clubs
- Years: Club
- 1909–1930 1917 1926: Cappamore; Murroe; Claughaun
Club titles
- Limerick titles: 1
Inter-county
- Years: County
- 1914–1928: Limerick
Inter-county titles
- Munster titles: 3
- All-Irelands: 2
- NHL: 0

William Ryan (11 November 1894 – 16 July 1969) was an Irish hurler who played for club sides Cappamore, Murroe and Claughaun and at inter-county level with Limerick.

== Career ==
Ryan was just 15-years-old when he made his first appearance for Cappamore in the 1909 championship. Cappamore was not his only club, as he also won a Limerick JHC title with Murroe in 1917. Ryan also played Gaelic football at club level and captained Cappamore to a defeat by Foynes in the 1925 Limerick JFC final. He won a Limerick SHC title with the Claughaun in 1926. Ryan's 21-year club career came to an end with a defeat for Cappamore by Croom in the delayed 1929 Limerick SHC final.

Ryan first appeared on the inter-county scene with Limerick in 1914 and continued to line until his retirement in 1928. He enjoyed his first success when he was part of the Limerick team that beat Wexford in the 1918 All-Ireland final. Ryan claimed a second All-Ireland medal following Limerick's defeat of Dublin in the 1921 All-Ireland final. His other honours include three Munster SHC medal and four Thomond Feis medals.

Ryan's performances at inter-county level resulted in his inclusion on the Ireland team at the Tailteann Games in 1924. He also enjoyed a lengthy career as a referee.

== Personal life and death ==
Ryan, who worked as a farmer in Cappamore, married Nora Power on 21 January 1931 and the couple had four children. His two sons, Séamus and Liam, were part of the Limerick team that won the Munster SHC title in 1955.

Ryan died on 16 July 1969, at the age of 74.

== Honours ==
Murroe

- Limerick Junior Hurling Championship: 1917

Claughaun

- Limerick Senior Hurling Championship: 1926

Limerick

- All-Ireland Senior Hurling Championship: 1918, 1921
- Munster Senior Hurling Championship: 1918, 1921, 1923
- Thomond Feis: 1920, 1922, 1925, 1928
