= 1959 Limerick Senior Hurling Championship =

Annual hurling competition season

- Champions: Cappamore (4th title)
- Runners-up: St Patrick's

The 1959 Limerick Senior Hurling Championship was the 65th staging of the Limerick Senior Hurling Championship since its establishment by the Limerick County Board in 1887.

Claughaun were the defending champions.

The final was played on 30 August 1959 at the Gaelic Grounds in Limerick, between Cappamore and St Patrick's, in what was their first ever meeting in the final. Cappamore won the match by 2–08 to 0–04 to claim their fourth championship title overall and a first title in three years.

== Results ==
=== Final ===
30 August 1950 Final	Cappamore	2-08 - 0-04	St Patrick's	Gaelic Grounds
