= 1968 Limerick Senior Hurling Championship =

Annual hurling competition season

- Champions: Claughaun (8th title); Éamonn Cregan (captain)
- Runners-up: Adare

The 1968 Limerick Senior Hurling Championship was the 74th staging of the Limerick Senior Hurling Championship since its establishment by the Limerick County Board in 1887.

Kilmallock were the defending champions.

On 29 September 1968, Claughaun won the championship after a 2–09 to 2–05 defeat of Adare in the final. It was their eighth championship title overall and their first championship title in ten years.

== Results ==
=== Final ===
29 September 1968 Final	Claughaun	2–09 – 2–05	Adare	Gaelic Grounds, Limerick
	L Moloney 1–1, K Mannion 1–0, É Cregan 0–3, P O'Dwyer 0–2, M Graham 0–2, A Dunworth 0–1.		J Brennan 1–2, W Chawke 1–0, G Shire 0–2, P Flanagan 0–1.	Referee: D Nealon (Tipperary)
