= 1985 Limerick Senior Hurling Championship =

Annual hurling competition season

- Teams: 27
- Champions: Kilmallock (6th title); Mike Carroll (captain); Willie O'Brien (manager)
- Runners-up: South Liberties; Joe McKenna (manager)

The 1985 Limerick Senior Hurling Championship was the 91st staging of the Limerick Senior Hurling Championship since its establishment by the Limerick County Board in 1887.

Patrickswell entered the championship as the defending champions, however, they were beaten by Hospital-Herbertstown in the first round.

On 8 September 1985, Kilmallock won the championship after a 3–12 to 1–13 defeat of South Liberties in the final. It was their sixth championship title overall and their first title in ten championship seasons.

== Results ==
=== Quarter-finals ===
21 July 1985 Quarter-final	Claughaun	1–10 – 1–04	Drom/Athlacca	FitzGerald Park
	J Brown 1–1, G Ryan 0–3, A Walsh 0–2, D Fitzgerald 0–2, J Rea 0–1, M Rea 0–1.		W Neenan 1–1, R Herlihy 0–1, M Moynihan 0–1, G Mulcahy 0–1.

21 July 1985 Quarter-final	Kilmallock	4–09 – 1–04	Ardpatrick	Bruff
	P Kelly 2–5, D O'Riordan 1–1, J Neenan 1–1, E Wylie 0–1, D Barry 0–1.		P Heffernan 1–0, E McGrath 0–2, P McCarthy 0–1, E O'Keeffe 0–1.

28 July 1985 Quarter-final	Feohanagh-Castlemahon	1–21 – 2–03	Old Christians	FitzGerald Park
	T Quaid 0–14, T Quaid 1–0, G Quaid 0–3, J Lenihan 0–2, O Flanagan 0–1, P O'Mahony 0–1.		P Howard 1–1, T Kennedy 1–0, T Sheehan 0–2.

28 July 1985 Quarter-final	South Liberties	2–12 – 2–09	Bruff	FitzGerald Park
	L Dooley 2–4, E Grimes 0–2, J McKenna 0–2, N Nash 0–2, B Finn 0–1, M Nash 0–1.		R O'Leary 0–5, A Gubbins 1–0, P Reale 1–0, P Barrett 0–3, A Madden 0–1.

=== Semi-finals ===
17 August 1985 Semi-final	Kilmallock	3–11 – 2–11	Feohanagh-Castlemahon	Bruff Grounds
	P Kelly 1–5, B Guiney 2–0, L Tobin 0–2, D Barry 0–1, J Neenan 0–1, D Riordan 0–1, M Nelligan 0–1.		T Quaid 1–7, S Quaid 1–1, P O'Mahony 0–1, M McSweeney 0–1, J Lynch 0–1.

18 August 1985 Semi-final	South Liberties	3–08 – 1–10	Claughaun	Bruff Grounds
	J McKenna 2–1, M Nash 1–1, L Dooley 0–3, B Finn 0–2, P Donnelly 0–1.		D Fitzgerald 1–2, G Ryan 0–3, A Walsh 0–2, J Hannon 0–2, M Rea 0–1.

=== Final ===
8 September 1985 Final	Kilmallock	3–12 – 1–13	South Liberties	Gaelic Grounds
	J Neenan 2–4, P Kelly 0–6, G O'Brien 1–0, M Nelligan 0–1, B Savage 0–1.		P Donnelly 1–2, L Dooley 0–5 E Grimes 0–3, J McKenna 0–1, M Nash 0–1, M Grimes 0–1.	Referee: T Murray (Patrickswell)
