= Graeme Mulcahy =

Irish hurler

Personal information
- Native name: Gréacháin Ó Maolchathaigh (Irish)
- Born: 2 June 1990 (age 36) Kilmallock, County Limerick, Ireland
- Occupation: Project engineer
- Height: 5 ft 10 in (178 cm)

Sport
- Sport: Hurling
- Position: Left corner-forward
Club
- Years: Club
- 2007-present: Kilmallock
Club titles
- Limerick titles: 4
- Munster titles: 1
College
- Years: College
- 2008-2011: University College Cork
College titles
- Fitzgibbon titles: 1
Inter-county*
| Years | County | Apps (scores) |
| 2009-2024 | Limerick | 64 (10-83) |
Inter-county titles
- Munster titles: 7
- All-Irelands: 5
- NHL: 3
- All Stars: 1
- *Inter County team apps and scores correct as of 20:04, 09 June 2024.

Graeme Mulcahy (born 2 June 1990) is an Irish hurler who plays as a left corner-forward for club side Kilmallock and previously at inter-county level for the Limerick senior hurling team.

== Playing career ==
=== Kilmallock ===
Mulcahy joined the Kilmallock club at a young age and played in all grades at juvenile and underage levels, enjoying championship success in the minor and under-21 grades. He made his senior championship debut as a seventeen-year-old during the 2007 championship.

On 3 October 2010, Mulcahy lined out in his first Limerick Senior Championship final. He scored 1-01 from play in the 1–16 to 1–12 defeat of divisional side Emmets.

After surrendering their championship crown in 2011, Kilmallock reached the championship decider again on 7 October 2012. Mulcahy was held scoreless, however, his brother, Jake Mulcahy, scored a vital goal to secure a 1–15 to 0–15 victory over Adare.

On 19 October 2014, Mulcahy captained Kilmallock to a third championship victory following a 1–15 to 0–14 defeat of reigning champions Na Piarsaigh. He later won a Munster Championship medal, scoring six points from play, following a 1–32 to 3-18 extra-time defeat of Cratloe in the final. On 17 March 2015, Mulcahy captained Kilmallock in their 1–18 to 1–06 defeat by Ballyhale Shamrocks in the All-Ireland final at Croke Park.

=== Limerick ===
==== Minor and under-21 ====
Mulcahy first played for Limerick at minor level. He made his first appearance for the team on 23 June 2007 in a 3–21 to 0–12 defeat by Tipperary in the Munster Championship. Mulcahy was eligible for the minor grade again in 2008, however, Limerick's season ended with a 0–23 to 0–11 defeat by Cork.

Mulcahy subsequently joined the Limerick under-21 hurling team. On 3 August 2011, he scored 2-01 from play when Limerick defeated Cork by 4–20 to 1–27 in the final of the Munster Championship.

==== Senior ====
On 15 February 2009, Mulcahy made his senior debut as a substitute in a National League defeat by Kilkenny at Nowlan Park. Later that season he made his first championship appearance in a 0–25 to 0–17 defeat by Waterford in the Munster Championship.

Mulcahy claimed his first silverware at senior level on 30 April 2011 when Limerick won the National League Division 2 title after a 4–12 to 2–13 defeat of Clare in the final at Cusack Park.

On 14 July 2013, Mulcahy was at right corner-forward in Limerick's 0–24 to 0–15 defeat of Cork in the Munster final. He ended the season by being nominated for an All-Star award.

On 19 August 2018, Mulcahy scored 1-02 from play when Limerick won their first All-Ireland title in 45 years after a 3–16 to 2–18 defeat of Galway in the final. Later that day he was named on The Sunday Game Team of the Year. Mulcahy ended the season by winning an All-Star Award.

On 31 March 2019, Mulcahy was selected at left corner-forward for Limerick's National League final meeting with Waterford at Croke Park. He collected a winners' medal after scoring three points from play in the 1–24 to 0–19 victory. On 30 June 2019, Mulcahy won his first Munster Championship medal in six years after scoring two points from full-forward in Limerick's 2–26 to 2–14 defeat of Tipperary in the final. He ended the year by receiving his second successive All-Star nomination.

On 21 October 2024, Mulcahy announced his retirement from inter-county hurling.

=== Munster ===
Mulcahy was selected for the Munster inter-provincial team for the first time on 17 February 2013. He later won a Railway Cup medal following a 1–22 to 0–15 defeat of Connacht. Mulcahy was also selected for the Munster team in 2014.

== Career statistics ==
As of match played 09 June 2024.

| Team | Year | National League | | | Munster | | All-Ireland | | Total | |
| Team | Year | Division | Apps | Score | Apps | Score | Apps | Score | Apps | Score |
|---|---|---|---|---|---|---|---|---|---|---|
| Limerick | 2009 | Division 1 | 4 | 0-01 | 1 | 0-00 | 0 | 0-00 | 5 | 0-01 |
| Limerick | 2010 | Division 1 | 7 | 2-07 | 1 | 0-03 | 1 | 0-01 | 9 | 2-11 |
| Limerick | 2011 | Division 2 | 4 | 1-01 | 1 | 0-01 | 2 | 1-04 | 7 | 2-06 |
| Limerick | 2012 | Division 1B | 6 | 0-14 | 1 | 1-02 | 4 | 2-11 | 11 | 3-27 |
| Limerick | 2013 | Division 1B | 6 | 1-11 | 2 | 0-02 | 1 | 0-01 | 9 | 1-14 |
| Limerick | 2014 | Division 1B | 5 | 3-05 | 2 | 0-04 | 2 | 0-05 | 9 | 3-14 |
| Limerick | 2015 | Division 1B | 1 | 0-04 | 2 | 1-03 | 2 | 0-04 | 5 | 1-11 |
| Limerick | 2016 | Division 1B | 6 | 2-04 | 1 | 0-00 | 2 | 1-00 | 9 | 3-04 |
| Limerick | 2017 | Division 1B | 6 | 1-06 | 1 | 0-00 | 0 | 0-00 | 7 | 1-06 |
| Limerick | 2018 | Division 1B | 3 | 2-04 | 4 | 1-06 | 4 | 2-10 | 11 | 5-20 |
| Limerick | 2019 | Division 1A | 6 | 1-07 | 5 | 1-09 | 1 | 0-02 | 12 | 2-18 |
| Limerick | 2020 | Division 1A | 6 | 0-07 | 3 | 0-08 | 2 | 0-00 | 11 | 0-15 |
| Limerick | 2021 | Division 1A | 2 | 0-01 | 2 | 0-01 | 2 | 0-01 | 6 | 0-03 |
| | 2022 | | 4 | 0-05 | 5 | 0-01 | 2 | 0-00 | 11 | 0-06 |
| | 2023 | | 2 | 0-00 | 4 | 0-02 | 2 | 0-01 | 8 | 0-03 |
| | 2024 | | 4 | 0-04 | 2 | 0-00 | 0 | 0-00 | 6 | 0-04 |
| Career total | | | 72 | 13-82 | 36 | 4-42 | 27 | 6-40 | 137 | 23-163 |

== Honours ==
University College Cork

- Fitzgibbon Cup (1): 2009

Kilmallock

- Munster Senior Club Hurling Championship (1): 2014 (c)
- Limerick Senior Hurling Championship (4): 2010, 2012, 2014 (c), 2021

Limerick

- All-Ireland Senior Hurling Championship (5): 2018, 2020, 2021, 2022, 2023
- Munster Senior Hurling Championship (7): 2013, 2019, 2020, 2021, 2022, 2023, 2024
- National Hurling League (3): 2019, 2020, 2023
- Munster Under-21 Hurling Championship (1): 2011

Munster

- Railway Cup (1): 2014

Awards

- GAA GPA All Stars Awards (1): 2018
- The Sunday Game Team of the Year (1): 2018
