= Seán McGrath =

Irish hurler

Personal information
- Native name: Seán Mac Craith (Irish)
- Born: 27 December 1991 (age 34) Dublin, Ireland
- Occupation: Student
- Height: 1.85 m (6 ft 1 in)

Sport
- Sport: Hurling
- Position: Full Forward
Club
- Years: Club
- 2009-: Kilmacud Crokes
Club titles
- Dublin titles: 2
Inter-county
- Years: County
- 2013-: Dublin
Inter-county titles
- Leinster titles: 1

Seán McGrath (born 27 December 1991) is an Irish hurler who plays as a full forward for the Kilmacud Crokes senior team.

McGrath has also lined out for Dublin in both the minor and under-21 grades and has enjoyed some success. He has won one Leinster medal as a member of the Dublin under-21 team.

At club level McGrath is a two-time county club championship medalist with Kilmacud Crokes.

== Playing career ==
=== Club ===
McGrath plays his club hurling with Kilmacud Crokes.

After coming to prominence in various juvenile grades, McGrath was a member of the Kilmacud minor hurling team in 2007. He won his first minor championship medal that year following a comprehensive 1–11 to 0–5 defeat of Na Fianna.

Two years later McGrath secured a second championship medal in the minor grade as Kilmacud defeated St. Vincent's by 2–11 to 2–6.

By 2012 McGrath was a member of the Kilmacud Crokes senior hurling team. That year he won a senior championship medal following a 2–10 to 0–9 defeat of Cuala. It was Kilmacud's first championship title in twenty-seven years.

=== Inter-county ===
McGrath first came to prominence on the inter-county scene as a member of the Dublin minor hurling team. Hen enjoyed little success in this grade before moving onto the county under-21 hurling team.

In 2011 McGrath won a Leinster medal with the under-21 hurlers, following a 1–18 to 0–11 defeat of Wexford. Dublin later qualified for an All-Ireland showdown with Galway. A 3–14 to 1–10 defeat was McGrath's lot on that occasion.

== Honours ==
=== Team ===
Kilmacud Crokes

- Dublin Senior Club Hurling Championship (1): 2012
- Dublin Minor Club Hurling Championship (1): 2007, 2009

Dublin

- Leinster Under-21 Hurling Championship (1): 2011
