= Liam Ryan (Limerick hurler) =

Irish priest, sociologist and hurler

Personal information
- Native name: Liam Ó Riain (Irish)
- Born: 1936 Cappamore, County Limerick, Ireland
- Died: 27 May 2015 (aged 79) Castletroy, Limerick, Ireland
- Occupations: Roman Catholic priest, Professor of Sociology

Sport
- Sport: Hurling
- Position: Left wing-forward
Club
- Years: Club
- 1954–1960: Cappamore
Club titles
- Limerick titles: 3
Inter-county
- Years: County
- 1952–1960: Limerick
Inter-county titles
- Munster titles: 1
- All-Irelands: 0
- NHL: 0

Liam Ryan (1936 – 27 May 2015) was an Irish priest, sociologist and hurler who played as a left wing-forward at senior level for the Limerick county team.

Ryan made his first appearance for the team during the 1955 championship and played intermittently for the team over the course of the next six seasons. During that time he won one Munster winners' medal. He was captain on that occasion and remains the youngest Munster final-winning captain.

At club level, Ryan was a three-time county championship winners' medalist with his local Cappamore club.

== Playing career ==
=== Club ===
Ryan played his club hurling with the Cappamore club and enjoyed much success in a brief club championship career.

He spent four years with the Cappamore minor hurling team, winning two East Limerick championship titles, however, the club narrowly missed out on a county minor title on both occasions.

By this stage Ryan had already lined out for Cappamore's top team. He was barely sixteen when he won a county junior championship winners' medal in 1952. His inclusion on the team was as a result of a shortage of players.

Two years later in 1954 Cappamore had reached the final of the county senior championship. A victory over Western Gaels gave Ryan a county senior championship winners' medal. He added two more senior medals to his collection in 1956 and 1959.

=== Inter-county ===
Ryan first came to prominence on the inter-county scene as a member of the Limerick minor hurling team in 1952. He enjoyed little success in this grade, losing back-to-back Munster finals in 1953 and 1954.

In 1955 Ryan made his debut as captain with the Limerick senior hurling team. After beating Waterford in the opening round of the provincial campaign, Limerick later went into the Munster final as underdogs against Clare. In a shock result Limerick defeated their nearest neighbours by 2-16 to 2-6. Ryan, in collecting the cup, became the youngest Munster final-winning captain. Limerick later played Wexford in the All-Ireland semi-final, however, they were comfortably beaten by 2-12 to 2-3.

Limerick reached the provincial decider again in 1956 with Cork providing the opposition. Ryan's side looked set to retain their title, however, a hat-trick of goals by Christy Ring swung the result in Cork's favour and Limerick were beaten by 5-5 to 3-5.

Ryan's studies for the priesthood impacted on his inter-county career and he missed the next three championship seasons with Limerick.

In 1960 Ryan was back with Limerick, however, as he had already been ordained a priest and was not allowed to play, he adopted the name 'Tom' Ryan and played anyhow. Tipperary easily won that match, bringing an end to Ryan's inter-county career.

== Personal life ==
Ryan was born into a family that had a strong association with hurling. His father, Willie Ryan, was a hurler with the great Limerick team of the 1918-1921 era and won two All-Ireland winners' medals.

He was educated locally in Cappamore before later attending St. Flannan's College in Ennis where he excelled as a hurler. He won a Dr. Harty Cup winners' medal in 1952 and an inter-provincial colleges' title with Munster the following year.

== Academic and Clerical career ==
Liam Ryan
- Born: 1936
- Died: 27 May 2015 (aged 78–79)

Academic background
- Education: Maynooth College; University of Missouri–St. Louis

Academic work
- Discipline: Sociology
- Institutions: University College Cork; Maynooth College; Maynooth University

Ryan, along with his brother Séamus Ryan, who also hurled with Limerick, subsequently studied for the priesthood at Maynooth College where he was ordained in 1960 for the Roman Catholic Archdiocese of Cashel and Emly. Ryan excelled academically earning two masters degrees and doctorates in theology (1962) and in sociology. Following his post-graduate studies (DD) in Maynooth he completed his PhD in Sociology at the University of Missouri–St. Louis.

He lectured in the Department of Sociology in University College Cork. During this time, in 1967, he published his famous Social Dynamite: A study of early school-leavers, which predicted many of the social problems which came to pass in Limerick and suggested solutions.

Rev. Dr. Ryan was appointed Professor of Sociology at Maynooth University in 1969 holding the position until 2000. He was instrumental in the setting up of the Department of Anthropology in 1983, as well as the development of the Department of Adult and Community Education. In the 1980s Ryan pioneered Sociology as part of the Oscail distance learning BA degree with other Irish universities. Ryan also served as vice-president of St Patrick's College, Maynooth from 1974-1976.

== Death and legacy ==
Ryan died on 27 May 2015 and was buried in the grounds of St. Michael’s Church, Cappamore in his native Limerick. A memorial night of appreciation was also held Maynooth later in the year, and a booklet was produced by the sociology department, which had contributions and tributes from President Michael D. Higgins and from his colleagues and former students. Also in his memory, a hardback version of his book Social Dynamite was reproduced by Limerick Regeneration.

Sporting positions
Preceded by	Limerick Senior Hurling Captain; 1955	Succeeded by Tommy Casey
