= Bernie Hartigan =

Irish hurler

Personal information
- Native name: Beircheart Ó hArtagáin (Irish)
- Born: 1943 (age 82–83) Limerick, Ireland
- Height: 5 ft 11 in (180 cm)

Sport
- Sport: Hurling
- Position: Midfield
Club
- Years: Club
- Old Christians
Club titles
	Football	Hurling
Limerick titles	1	0
Inter-county
- Years: County
- 1964-1974: Limerick
Inter-county titles
- Munster titles: 2
- All-Irelands: 1
- NHL: 1
- All Stars: 0

Bernard Hartigan (born 1943) is an Irish retired hurler who played as a midfielder for the Limerick senior team.

Hartigan made his first appearance for the team during the 1964 championship and was a regular member of the starting for the next decade. During that time he won one All-Ireland medal, two Munster medals and one National Hurling League medal.

At club level, Hartigan was a one-time county football championship medalist with Old Christians.

Hartigan's brother, Pat, was also an All-Ireland medalist with Limerick.
