= 2014–15 All-Ireland Senior Club Hurling Championship =

All-Ireland Senior Club Hurling Championship 2014–15
Championship Details
- Dates: 12 October 2014 – 17 March 2015

All Ireland Champions
- Winners: Ballyhale Shamrocks
- Captain: T. J. Reid
- Manager: Andy Moloney

All Ireland Runners-up
- Runners-up: Kilmallock
- Captain: Graeme Mulcahy
- Manager: Ger "Sparrow" O'Loughlin

Provincial Champions
- Munster: Kilmallock
- Leinster: Ballyhale Shamrocks
- Ulster: Portaferry
- Connacht: Not Played

Championship Statistics
- Matches Played: 17
- Top Scorer: T. J. Reid (0–32)

The 2014–15 All-Ireland Senior Club Hurling Championship was the 45th staging of the All-Ireland championship since its establishment in 1970. The championship began on 12 October 2014 and ended on 17 March 2015.

Portumna were the defending champions.

Ballyhale Shamrocks won the title after a 1–18 to 1–6 win against Kilmallock in the final.

== Team summaries ==
=== Participating clubs ===
Team	County	Captain(s)	Manager(s)	Most recent success		
Team	County	Captain(s)	Manager(s)	All-Ireland	Provincial	County
Ballygunner	Waterford	Philip Mahony; Harley Barnes	Fergal Hartley		2001	2011
Ballyhale Shamrocks	Kilkenny	T. J. Reid	Colm Bonnar	2010	2009	2012
Cratloe	Clare	Liam Markham	Joe McGrath			2009
Gort	Galway	Greg Lally	Michael Finn		1983	2011
Kilcormac/Killoughey	Offaly	Dan Currams	Danny Owens		2012	2013
Kilmacud Crokes	Dublin	Seán McGrath	Ollie Baker			2012
Kilmallock	Limerick	Graeme Mulcahy	Ger O'Loughlin		1994	2012
Lisbellaw	Fermanagh		Brian Johnston; Aidy McPhillips			2013
Portaferry	Down	John Convery	Seán Young			2006
Raharney	Westmeath	Conor Jordan	Johnny Greville			2010
Rathdowney-Errill	Laois	Alan Delaney	Conor Gleeson			2012
Ruairí Óg	Antrim	Arron Graffin	Terence McNaughton		2008	2008
Sarsfield's	Cork	Tadhg Óg Murphy	Pat Ryan			2012
Shelmaliers	Wexford	Ciarán O'Shaughnessy	Vinny Parker			
Slaughtneil	Derry	Gareth O'Kane	Mickey Glover			2013
St. Mullin's	Carlow	John Doran	Anthony McCormack			2010
Thurles Sarsfields	Tipperary	Pa Bourke	Tommy Maher		2012	2012

== Fixtures and results ==
=== Leinster Senior Club Hurling Championship ===
2 November 2014 Quarter-final	Kilmacud Crokes	0–23 – 0–22 (AET)	Rathdowney-Errill	Parnell Park
	S McGrath (0–15, 13f, 1 65), C Conway (0-03, 1f), C Clinton (0-01), D Kelly (0-01), Ross O'Carroll (0-01), R O'Dwyer (0-01), B O'Rorke (0-01).	Report	R King (0–13, 10f), T Dowling (0–02), P Purcell (0-02), J Purcell (0-02), E Meagher (0-01), D King (0-01), E Burke (0-01).	Referee: P O'Dwyer (Carlow)

2 November 2014 Quarter-final	Raharney	2–11 – 0–9	St. Mullin's	Cusack Park
	K Doyle 1–4 (all frees), C Doyle 0–3, J Shaw 1–0, B Connaughton 0–2 (2 frees), C Boyle and R Greville 0–1 each.	Report	M Kavanagh 0–8 (0–6 frees) and P Kehoe 0–1.	Referee: G McGrath (Dublin)

2 November 2014 Quarter-final	Shelmaliers	0–18 – 2–13 (AET)	Kilcormac/Killoughey	Wexford Park
	J Kelly (0–10, 8f), E Doyle (0–3), C O'Shaughnessy (0–2), B Doyle (0–1), S Banville (0–1), T Barron (0–1).	Report	Ciaran Slevin (0–5, 4f), Conor Mahon (1–1), C Kiely (0–4), J Gorman (1–0), D Kilmartin (0–1), K Leonard (0–1), P Geraghty (0–1).	Referee: S Cleere

16 November 2014 Semi-final	Raharney	1–08 – 1–13	Kilcormac/Killoughey	Cusack Park
	C Doyle 1–3 (1f); K Doyle 0–3 (1f); J Shaw, J Boyle 0–1 each.	Report	C Slevin 0–9 (5fs); D Currams 1–0; C Kiely 0–2; P Geraghty 0–1 (sideline); B Leonard 0–1.	Referee: D Hughes (Carlow)

23 November 2014 Semi-final	Kilmacud Crokes	0–12 – 2–15	Ballyhale Shamrocks	Parnell Park
	R O’Dwyer (0-05, 4f), C Conway (0-02), S McGrath (0-02, 2f), D Mulligan (0-02).	Report	TJ Reid (1-08, 6f), H Shefflin (1-02), C Fennelly (0-02), M Aylward (0-02), J Fitzpatrick (0-01).	Referee: J Keenan (Wicklow)

7 December 2014 Final	Kilcormac/Killoughey	1–14 – 0–21 (AET)	Ballyhale Shamrocks	O'Moore Park
	Ciaran Slevin (0-07, 5f), D Currams (1-01), C Kiely (0-02), J Gorman (0-02), D Kilmartin (0-01), Conor Mahon (0-01).	Report	TJ Reid (0–10, 7f, 1 65), H Shefflin (0-04), M Aylward (0-02), J Fitzpatrick (0-02), C Walsh (0-01), E Reid (0-01), R Corcoran (0-01).	Referee: P O'Dwyer (Carlow)

=== Munster Senior Club Hurling Championship ===
26 October 2014 Quarter-final	Ballygunner	1–10 – 3–7	Cratloe	Walsh Park
	Pauric Mahoney (0–5, four frees, one 65), C Power (1–0), JJ Hutchinson (0–2), D O’Sullivan (0–2), Barry O’Sullivan (0–1).	Report	C McGrath (2–4, 0–3 frees), C McInerney (1–0), G Considine (0–1), E Boyce (0–1), D Collins (0–1).	Referee: D Kirwan

9 November 2014 Semi-final	Kilmallock	3–22 – 3–20 (AET)	Sarsfield's	FitzGerald Park, Kilmallock
	E. Ryan 0–7 (0–5 fs, 0–1 65); K. Kennelly 1–2; P. O’Loughlin 1–1, G. Mulcahy 0–4; G. O’Mahony 1–0, R. Egan 0–3; C. Barry 0–2; P. O’Brien, J. Mulcahy and B. O’Sullivan 0–1 each.	Report	C. McCarthy 0–12 (0–9 fs, 0–1 65); M. Cussen 1–2; E. Quigley, K. Murphy 1–0 each, D. Kearney 0–3; E. O’Sullivan 0–2, C. Duggan 0–1.	Referee: F Horgan (Tipperary)

9 November 2014 Semi-final	Cratloe	1–18 – 0–14	Thurles Sarsfields	Cusack Park
	C McGrath (0–11, 0–5 frees, 0–1 ’65); P Collins (1–2); L Markham (0–3, 0–1 free); S Collins, C McInerney (0–1 each).	Report	P Bourke (0–8, 0–7 frees); T Doyle (0–2); B McCarthy, M Cahill, S Cahill, C Lanigan (0–1 each).	Referee: C McAllister (Cork)

23 November 2014 Final	Kilmallock	1–32 – 3–18 (AET)	Cratloe	Gaelic Grounds
	J Mulcahy (1-06), B O’Sullivan (0-07), G Mulcahy (0-06), E Ryan (0-05, 4f, 1'65), P O’Brien (0-04), K O’Donnell (0-01), G O’Mahony (0-01), P O’Loughlin (0-01), K Kennelly (0-01).	Report	C McGrath (1-06, 0-03f), C McInerney (1-03), G Considine (1-00), L Markham (0-03, 1f, 1'65), S Collins (0-03), M Ogie Murphy (0-01), P Collins (0-01), D Collins (0-01).	Referee: F Horgan (Tipperary)

=== Ulster Senior Club Hurling Championship ===
12 October 2014 Semi-final	Slaughtneil	0–26 – 3–17 (AET)	Ruairí Óg	Owenbeg
	G O'Kane (0–7, 5f), C McKaigue (0–6, 1f), B Rogers (0–4), S McGuigan (0–3), G Bradley (0–3), M Kearney (0–1), C McKenna (0-1f), C O'Doherty (0-1f).	Report	N McManus (0–9, 6f, 1'65), S McNaughton (1–1), D McNaughton (1–0), A McNaughton (1–0), E Campbell (0–3), C Carson (0–2), P McNaughton (0–1), C McNaughton (0–1).	Referee: J Clarke

12 October 2014 Semi-final	Lisbellaw	1–11 – 2–17	Portaferry	St. Tiernach's Park
	S Corrigan (1–5, 0-5f), J Duffy (0-5f), D Teague (0–1).	Report	R Magee (1–3), P Braniff (0–6, 4f), C Mageean (1–1), C O'Prey (0-2f), A O'Prey (0–2), C Coulter (0–1), A Savage (0–1), S Mageean (0–1).	Referee: O Elliot

26 October 2014 Semi-final replay	Slaughtneil	0–10 – 2–10	Ruairí Óg	Páirc Mac Uílín
	G O’Kane 0–3 (3f), C McKenna 0–2 (2f), B Rodgers 0–2, S McGuigan, O Doherty, C Doherty 0–1 each.	Report	N McManus (1–5, pen, 4f, 1 ‘65’), K McKeegan 1–1, S McNaughton 0–2, P McGill 0–2.	Referee: B Sweeney (Cavan)

2 November 2014 Final	Portaferry	1–16 – 0–11	Ruairí Óg	Owenbeg
	E Sands (1-03, 0–02 lineballs), P Braniff (0-06, 0-05f), A O’Prey (0-03), C Coulter (0-02); K McGarry (0-01), S Mageean (0-01).	Report	N McManus (0-05, 0-04f), E Campbell (0-02), K McKeegan (0-01); D McNaughton (0-01), E Laverty (0-01, 0-01f), C McNaughton (0-01).	Referee: É Hassan

=== All-Ireland Senior Club Hurling Championship ===
7 February 2015 Semi-final	Kilmallock	2–19 – 0–12	Portaferry	Cusack Park, Mullingar
14:00	E Ryan (0–7, 0-4f), G Mulcahy (1–2), B O’Sullivan (0–4), Paddy O’Loughlin (1–0), K O’Donnell (0–2, 0-1f), C Barry (0–1), P O’Brien (0–1), J Mulcahy (0–1), R Egan (0–1).	Report	P Braniff (0–9, 0-6f, 0–1 ’65), E Sands (0–1), C Mageean (0–1), K McGarry (0–1).	Referee: J Keenan (Wicklow)

7 February 2015 Semi-final	Ballyhale Shamrocks	2–17 – 1–15	Gort	O'Connor Park, Tullamore
14:00	TJ Reid (1–2, one free), H Shefflin (0–5), E Reid (1–0), B Aylward (0–3), C Walsh (0–3), P Reid (0–2), P Shefflin (0–1), C Fennelly (0–1).	Report	R Cummins (1–3), W Walsh (0–2), G O’Donoghue (0–2), M Mullins (0–2, one free), G Lally (0–2, one 65), G Quinn (0–2, both frees), J Grealish (0–1), P Killilea (0–1).	Referee: J Ryan (Tipperary)

17 March 2015 Final	Kilmallock	1–6 – 1–18	Ballyhale Shamrocks	Croke Park
	R Hanley 1–0, E Ryan 0–3 (3fs), R Egan, P O'Brien, G Mulcahy all 0–1 each.	Report	TJ Reid 0–6 (4fs), C Fennelly 1–3, E Reid 0–3, H Shefflin, M Aylward 0–2 each, B Aylward, A Cuddihy 0–1 each	Referee: J Owens (Wexford)

== Championship statistics ==
=== Miscellaneous ===
- The Munster quarter-final between Ballygunner and Cratloe is their second ever meeting in the history of the championship. A win for Cratloe results in the club securing their very first provincial championship victory.
- Portaferry win the provincial title for the first time after losing eight previous Ulster deciders.
- Ballyhale Shamrocks win their eighth Leinster title to go one ahead of Birr to lead the all-time provincial roll of honour.

== Top scorers ==
=== Championship ===
#	Player	Club	Tally	Total	Games	Average
1	Conor McGrath	Cratloe	3–21	30	3	10.00
2	T. J. Reid	Ballyhale Shamrocks	2–20	26	3	8.66
3	Neil McManus	Ruairí Óg	1–19	22	3	7.33
3	Eoin Ryan	Kilmallock	0–22	22	4	5.50
4	Ciarán Slevin	Kilcormac/Killoughey	0–21	21	3	7.00
4	Paul Braniff	Portaferry	0–21	21	3	7.00
5	Seán McGrath	Kilmacud Crokes	0–17	17	2	8.00
6	Henry Shefflin	Ballyhale Shamrocks	1–13	16	4	4
7	Ross King	Rathdowney-Errill	0–13	13	1	13.00
8	Bryan O'Sullivan	Kilmallock	0–12	12	4	3.00

=== Single game ===
#	Player	Club	Tally	Total	Opposition
1	Seán McGrath	Kilmacud Crokes	0–15	15	Rathdowney-Errill
2	Ross King	Rathdowney-Errill	0–13	13	Kilmacud Crokes
3	Cian McCarthy	Sarsfields	0–12	12	Kilmallock
4	T. J. Reid	Ballyhale Shamrocks	1-08	11	Kilmacud Crokes
4	Conor McGrath	Cratloe	0–11	11	Thurles Sarsfields
6	Conor McGrath	Cratloe	2-04	10	Ballygunner
6	Joe Kelly	Shelmaliers	0–10	10	Kilcormac/Killoughey
6	T. J. Reid	Ballyhale Shamrocks	0–10	10	Kilcormac/Killoughey
9	Jake Mulcahy	Kilmallock	1-06	9	Cratloe
9	Conor McGrath	Cratloe	1-06	9	Kilmallock
9	Neil McManus	Ruairí Óg	0-09	9	Slaughtneil
9	Paul Braniff	Portaferry	0-09	9	Kilmallock
