= 1967 Limerick Senior Hurling Championship =

Annual hurling competition season

- Champions: Kilmallock (2nd title); Mick Heelan (captain)
- Runners-up: South Liberties; Pat Portley (captain)

The 1967 Limerick Senior Hurling Championship was the 73rd staging of the Limerick Senior Hurling Championship since its establishment by the Limerick County Board.

Patricksell were the defending champions.

On 15 October 1967, Kilmallock won the championship after a 4–07 to 2–07 defeat of South Liberties in a final replay. It was their second championship title overall and their first championship title since 1960.

== Results ==
=== Final ===
1 October 1967 Final	Kilmallock	3–03 – 0–12	South Liberties	Gaelic Grounds, Limerick

15 October 1967 Final	Kilmallock	4–07 – 2–07	South Liberties	Gaelic Grounds, Limerick
