= 1971 Limerick Senior Hurling Championship =

Annual hurling competition season

- Champions: Claughaun (9th title); Mickey Cregan (captain)
- Runners-up: South Liberties

The 1971 Limerick Senior Hurling Championship was the 77th staging of the Limerick Senior Hurling Championship since its establishment by the Limerick County Board in 1887.

Patrickswell were the defending champions.

On 12 December 1971, Claughaun won the championship after a 6–06 to 2–13 defeat of South Liberties in the final. It was their ninth championship title overall and their first championship title in three years.

== Results ==
=== Semi-finals ===
31 October 1971 Semi-final	Claughaun	1-12 - 1-09	Patrickswell	Gaelic Grounds
	A Dunworth 0-7, B Galligan 1-1, R Prendergast 0-1, D Sheehan 0-1, M Graham 0-1, E Cregan 0-1.		R Bennis 0-6, J Enright 1-0, S Foley 0-1, F Nolan 0-1, Peter Bennis 0-1.

14 November 1971 Semi-final	South Liberties	5-10 - 3-03	Garryspillane	Gaelic Grounds
	E Grimes 2-3, D O'Sullivan 2-0, T Ryan 1-1, M Shanahan 0-2, L Grimes 0-2, J Grimes 0-1, M Butler 0-1.		S Bourke 2-0, JJ Creed 1-1, J Carroll 0-2.

=== Final ===
12 December 1971 Final	Claughaun	6–06 – 2–13	South Liberties	Gaelic Grounds, Limerick
	A Dunworth 3–3, L Moloney 1–1, M Cregan 1–0, R Prendergast 1–0, É Cregan 0–1, D Sheehan 0–1.		É Grimes 1–9, E Dooley 1–1, T Ryan 0–1, L Grimes 0–1, W O'Donoghue 0–1.	Referee: T Cronin (Cork)
