= 1956 Limerick Senior Hurling Championship =

Annual hurling competition season

- Champions: Cappamore (3rd title)
- Runners-up: Claughaun

The 1956 Limerick Senior Hurling Championship was the 62nd staging of the Limerick Senior Hurling Championship since its establishment by the Limerick County Board in 1887.

Ahane were the defending champions.

Cappamore won the championship after a 5–04 to 2–07 defeat of Claughaun in the final. It was their third championship title overall and their first title in two years.
