= Mossie Dowling =

Irish hurler

Personal information
- Native name: Muiris Ó Dualaing (Irish)
- Born: Kilmallock, County Limerick

Sport
- Sport: Hurling
- Position: Half-forward
Club
- Years: Club
- 1963-1981: Kilmallock
Inter-county
- Years: County
- 1967-1976: Limerick
Inter-county titles
- Munster titles: 1
- All-Irelands: 1

Mossie Dowling (born 1946) is a former Irish sportsperson. He played hurling with his local club Kilmallock and with the Limerick senior intra-county team in the 1970s.
