= 1993 All-Ireland Senior Club Hurling Championship final =

1993 All-Ireland Senior Club Hurling Championship Final
- Event: 1992–93 All-Ireland Senior Club Hurling Championship
Sarsfields	Kilmallock
1-17	2-7
- Date: 17 March 1993
- Venue: Croke Park, Dublin
- Referee: Pat Horan (Offaly)
- Attendance: 21,714

The 1993 All-Ireland Senior Club Hurling Championship final was a hurling match played at Croke Park on 17 March 1993 to determine the winners of the 1992–93 All-Ireland Senior Club Hurling Championship, the 23rd season of the All-Ireland Senior Club Hurling Championship, a tournament organised by the Gaelic Athletic Association for the champion clubs of the four provinces of Ireland. The final was contested by Sarsfields of Galway and Kilmallock of Limerick, with Sarsfields winning by 1–17 to 2–7.

The All-Ireland final was a unique occasion as it was the first ever championship meeting between Sarsfield's and Kilmallock. It remains their only championship meeting at this level. Both sides were hoping to make history by winning their first All-Ireland title.

Despite conceding goals at the beginning of each half, the Galway champions secured victory in the closing stages. A Joe Cooney free ended up in the net five minutes from the end.

Sarsfields' victory secured their first All-Ireland title. They became the 16th club to win the All-Ireland title, while they were the third Galway representatives to claim the ultimate prize.

== Match ==
=== Details ===
17 March 1993

Sarsfields	1-17 - 2-7	Kilmallock
P Kelly 1-2, A Donohue 0-5 (5f), M McGrath 0-4, Peter Cooney 0-3, P Kelly 0-2, J Cooney 0-1.		P Kelly 1-1 (1f), P Barrett 1-0, M Houlihan 0-3 (1 sideline), D Clarke 0-2, P Tobin 0-1 (1f).

Croke Park, Dublin
Attendance: 21,714
Referee: P Horan (Offaly)

Sarsfields	Kilmallock
