= Kilmallock GAA =

Gaelic games club in County Limerick, Ireland

Kilmallock
- Cill Mocheallóg
- Founded: 1884
- County: Limerick
- Nickname: The Balbec
- Colours: Green and White
- Grounds: FitzGerald Park
- Coordinates: 52°23′52″N 8°34′25″W

Playing kits
Standard colours

Senior Club Championships
	All Ireland	Munster champions	Limerick champions
Football:	0	0	3
Hurling:	0	2	13
Camogie:	0	0	0

Kilmallock GAA is a Gaelic Athletic Association club in Kilmallock, County Limerick, Ireland. The club is primarily concerned with the game of hurling, but has also fielded teams in other Gaelic games.

== History ==
Located in the town of Kilmallock, about 20 miles outside Limerick, Kilmallock GAA Club was founded in 1885. Kilmallock's earliest successes where in Gaelic football, with the club claiming Limerick SFC titles in 1908, 1909 and 1916. Kilmallock made the hurling breakthrough in 1956 when they won the Limerick JHC title and earned promotion to the senior grade.

Four years after that initial junior triumph, Kilmallock won the Limerick SHC title after a defeat of Claughaun in 1960. A second Limerick SHC title followed in 1967, before Kilmallock claimed three successive titles between 1973 and 1975. The club also won Munster Club SHC titles in 1992 and 1994, as well as losing to Sarsfields in the 1993 All-Ireland club final.

The new century saw Kilmallock secure a number of underage titles in the minor and under-21 grades. The club also won three Limerick SHC titles in a five-year period between 2010 and 2014, as well as a third Munster Club SHC title in 2014 Kilmallock also had a 1-18 to 1-06 defeat by Ballyhale Shamrocks in the 2015 All-Ireland club final. The club claimed their 13th Limerick SHC title in 2026.

The club is sometimes called "The Balbec," a nickname derived from the Rev. Thomas Campbell, who in 1777 compared Kilmallock to Baalbek, Lebanon, because of its many picturesque medieval ruins.

== Grounds ==
The club play at FitzGerald Park on Emmet Street, in the south of the town, Gortboy townland. It was named for John Fitzgerald in 1980; he served as club secretary for many decades up to 1971.

== Honours ==
- Munster Senior Club Hurling Championship (2): 1992, 2014
- Limerick Senior Hurling Championship (13): 1960, 1967, 1973, 1974, 1975, 1985, 1992, 1994, 2010, 2012, 2014, 2021, 2026
- Limerick Senior Football Championship (3): 1908, 1909, 1916
- Limerick Junior Hurling Championship (5): 1925, 1939, 1943, 1956, 2019
- Limerick Under-21 Hurling Championship (7): 2002, 2006, 2007, 2008, 2009, 2011, 2018
- Limerick Minor Hurling Championship (15): 1955, 1961, 1964, 1967, 1972, 1973, 1987, 2000, 2001, 2002, 2004, 2005, 2006, 2009, 2010, 2026

== Notable hurlers ==
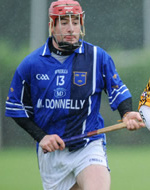
Andrew O'Shaughnessy of Kilmallock, playing for Munster in the Railway Cup, 2008

- Aaron Costello: All-Ireland SHC-winner (2020, 2021, 2022, 2023)
- Mossie Dowling: All-Ireland SHC-winner (1973)
- Barry Hennessy: All-Ireland SHC-winner (2018, 2020, 2021, 2022)
- Mike Houlihan: Munster SHC-winner (1994, 1996)
- Paddy Kelly: National Hurling League-winner (1983–84, 1984–85)
- Graeme Mulcahy: All-Ireland SHC-winner (2018, 2020, 2021, 2022, 2023)
- Shane O'Brien: All-Ireland SHC-winner (2023, 2026)
- Andrew O'Shaughnessy: All-Ireland U21HC-winner (2001, 2002)
- Pádraig Tobin: National Hurling League-winner (1997)
