= South Liberties GAA =

Gaelic games club in County Limerick, Ireland

South Liberties GAA Club
- Saor Theas
- Founded: 1884
- County: Limerick
- Nickname: Liberties/Souths
- Colours: Green and Gold
- Grounds: Dooley Park
- Coordinates: 52°36′00.80″N 8°36′20.56″W

Playing kits
Standard colours

Senior Club Championships
	All Ireland	Munster champions	Limerick champions
Hurling:	-	-	7

South Liberties (Irish: Saor Theas) is a Gaelic Athletic Association club based in County Limerick, Ireland. The club is based in the parish of Donoughmore-Knockea-Roxboro, on the southern outskirts of Limerick City and is affiliated to the East Board of Limerick GAA. It is one of the oldest clubs in the country, founded in 1884, the same year as the GAA. South Liberties' home ground in Ballysheedy is called Dooley Park, in memory of one of the club's greatest players. The club has won many county titles during its history, most notably seven Limerick Senior Hurling Championships; in 1888, 1889, 1890, 1972, 1976, 1978 and 1981. The club currently fields teams in the Senior hurling and Junior Gaelic football championships in Limerick.

== History ==
The club was founded in May 1884 when a group of people in the Ballysheedy area of County Limerick got together to play hurling. The club name reflects its location in the former "south liberties of Limerick"; this was the portion of the county of the city of Limerick outside the municipal boundary and south of the River Shannon, which was transferred to County Limerick in 1842. The boundaries of the liberties were marked with 'Liberty Stones' and the club has incorporated an image of the sole surviving stone into its crest. South Liberties' home ground in Ballysheedy is called Dooley Park, in memory of one of the club's greatest players. Johnny Dooley played for Liberties from the mid-1940s to 1970, when he died suddenly after playing in a county championship match. He was on the Limerick teams that won the All-Ireland Junior Hurling Championships of 1948, 1954 and 1957.

In the early days of the GAA, South Liberties were one of Limerick's greatest teams and contested the first five county finals, winning three of them in successive years, 1888–1890. A remarkable feature about these wins was that two of them were secured by the only score of an hour's hurling – one point in each case; made more remarkable by the fact that these games were played in the days when each side had 21 players and there were point posts at both sides of the goal, covering almost half of the end-line. On both occasions the point was scored by the same player, Con Sheehan, with Liberties defeating Murroe at Croom on 15 May 1888 and Kilfinane at Ráth Luirc on 13 July 1890. He also scored in the 1889 final when Liberties beat Caherline 1–2 to 0–3 at Croom on 13 July. John (Jack) Malone captained the Liberties' teams in all five finals. Many of the players that featured on those teams were forced to emigrate in the early 1890s and this coupled with the devastating effect that the Parnell Split had on GAA clubs meant that South Liberties ceased to be a force in Limerick hurling for another 75 years.

Clubhouse at Dooley Park

The club had very mixed fortunes during that time, with periods of inactivity during which the club barely survived, interspersed with some notable victories such as the 1911 County Intermediate Hurling Championship and the 1946 County Junior Hurling Championship. It was not until 1967 that South Liberties returned to prominence in Limerick senior hurling. The club elected to compete in the county senior hurling championship of that year – something that was permitted at that time. Against the odds, Liberties were beaten in the reply of the county final by Kilmallock after a much disputed draw in which Kilmallock scored a goal from a 21-yard free with the last puck of the game. Despite not winning the title that year, the progress justified the club's decision to compete at senior level and they remained at that grade.

The county championship was divided into four regional divisions in 1971 (City, East, West and South) and this suited South Liberties as they captured the East Limerick Senior Hurling Championship in 10 of the following 11 years. After losing the 1971 county final to Claughan, the club captured the county championships in 1972, 1976, 1978 and 1981, beating Patrickswell, Kileedy, Bruree and Kilmallock respectively. They also lost the 1980 and 1985 county finals to Kileedy and Kilmallock. South Liberties were one of the dominant forces in Limerick hurling over this 20-year period and provided a number of players to the Limerick teams that were competitive in the All-Ireland championships of 1973, 1974, 1980 and 1981.

Although the club endured a mediocre spell following the 1985 county final, they managed to retain senior status before being relegated to the intermediate grade following the 1996 season. They contested seven county finals at the intermediate grade before regaining senior status by beating Ballybrown in the 2009 Limerick Intermediate Hurling Championship final. The club also added the 2009 Munster Intermediate Club Hurling Championship to its honours list, beating Douglas from Cork in the final.

South Liberties won the County Junior A Football Championship in 2001 and competed at the Intermediate grade until 2008.

== Inter-county representation ==
The club has produced many Limerick county players over the years and had 3 members on the Limerick side that last won an All-Ireland Senior Hurling Championship in 1973. That Limerick team was captained by South Liberties' Eamonn Grimes with Pat Hartigan and Joe McKenna also playing. In 1975 these players also shared the rare distinction of three players from the same club being selected on an Allstar Hurling Team. These three players amassed a total of 13 Allstar awards between them with Joe McKenna being honoured six times between 1974 and 1981, Pat Hartigan collecting five in a row from 1971 and Eamon Grimes picking up awards in 1973 and 1975.

Eamon Grimes and his brother Michael featured on the Limerick teams that won Munster titles in 1980 and 1981 and were beaten All-Ireland finalists in 1980. Brothers Declan and Micháel Nash were on the Limerick teams beaten in the 1994 and 1996 All-Ireland finals and won National Hurling League medals in 1992 and 1997.

The following South Liberties' players represented Limerick in the Munster and All-Ireland Senior Hurling championships.

Player	Start	Sub	Total	Goals	Points	Total	Debut	Last Game	AIHC	MHC	NHL	All Stars
Johnny Dooley	1	0	1	0	0	0	08/07/51 v Tipperary	08/07/51 v Tipperary	0	0	0	0
Willie Dooley	1	0	1	1	0	3	22/06/52 v Cork	22/06/52 v Cork	0	0	0	0
Brian Finn	11	2	13	0	3	3	26/05/85 v Waterford	19/06/94 v Waterford	0	0	1	0
Eamonn Grimes	26	4	30	3	29	38	05/06/66 v Tipperary	07/09/80 v Galway	1	3	1	2
Joe Grimes	0	1	1	0	0	0	08/07/79 v Cork	08/07/79 v Cork	0	0	0	0
Michael Grimes	5	1	6	0	5	5	27/07/75 v Cork	13/06/82 v Waterford	0	1	0	0
Bernie Hartigan	22	1	23	1	24	27	09/06/63 v Galway	01/09/74 v Kilkenny	1	2	1	1
Pat Hartigan	25	0	25	0	1	1	22/06/69 v Tipperary	10/06/79 v Clare	1	2	1	5
Mark Keane	6	4	10	0	25	25	04/06/00 v Cork	22/07/06 v Cork	0	0	0	0
Joe McKenna	30	0	30	18	39	93	24/06/73 v Clare	16/06/85 v Cork	1	4	2	6
Barry Nash	16	11	27	0	12	12	19/06/16 v Tipperary	17/07/22 v Kilkenny	4	4	2	2
Declan Nash	23	3	26	0	0	0	22/05/88 v Kerry	30/05/99 v Waterford	0	2	2	0
Micháel Nash	15	0	15	0	0	0	21/05/89 v Kerry	15/07/97 v Tipperary	0	2	2	0
Thomas Ryan	1	8	9	0	5	5	27/05/12 v Tipperary	10/08/14 v Kilkenny	0	1	0	0
Albert Shanahan	3	0	3	0	0	0	25/05/97 v Waterford	30/05/04 v Cork	0	0	1	0
Joe Shanahan	1	1	2	0	0	0	01/06/58 v Tipperary	24/05/59 v Tipperary	0	0	0	0

- AIHC – All-Ireland Hurling Championship
- MHC – Munster Hurling Championship
- NHL – National Hurling League

== Honours ==
- Munster Intermediate Club Hurling Championship: (1) 2009
- Limerick Senior Hurling Championship: (7) 1888, 1889, 1890, 1972, 1976, 1978, 1981
- Limerick Intermediate Hurling Championship: (2) 1911, 2009
- Limerick Junior Hurling Championship: (1) 1946
- Limerick Minor Hurling Championship: (1) 1960
- Limerick Junior Football Championship: (1) 2002
- Limerick Under-21 Football Championship: (2) 1985, 1986
- Limerick Minor Football Championship: (2) 1948, 1982
- Limerick Junior C Football Championship: (1) 2025
