= Bruff GAA =

Gaelic games club in County Limerick, Ireland

Bruff
- Brú na Déise
- Founded: 1887
- County: Limerick
- Colours
- Grounds: Bruff Sportsfield

Playing kits
Standard colours

Senior Club Championships
	All Ireland	Munster champions	Limerick champions
Football:	0	0	0
Hurling:	0	0	0

Bruff GAA is a Gaelic Athletic Association club in Bruff, County Limerick, Ireland. The club is affiliated to the Limerick County Board and fields teams in both hurling and Gaelic football.

== History ==
Located in the village of Bruff, about 15 miles from Limerick, Bruff GAA Club was founded in 1887. The club spent a century without any notable successes at adult level. In spite of this, Bruff appeared in Limerick SHC finals in the early 1920s, however, they were beaten by Young Irelands in 1922 and Newcastle West in 1925. Bruff won the Limerick MHC title for the first time in 1941.

A second Limerick MHC title in 1983 and a first Limerick MFC title in 1984 paved the way for future successes at adult level. Bruff celebrated its centenary by winning the Limerick JAFC title in 1987. This was followed by a Limerick IHC title in 1989 and a return to the top flight. Bruff had one of its most successful seasons ever when, in 2008, the club claimed a treble of Limerick Premier U21FC, Limerick JAFC and Limerick IHC honours. Bruff were later beaten by Skellig Rangers in the 2008 Munster Club JFC final.

Bruff once again returned to the senior ranks of Limerick hurling when they beat Croom by 2–14 to 0–16 to win the Limerick PIHC title in 2014. Bruff won the Munster Club JBHC title in 2022, following a win over Thurles Sarsfields in the final.

== Honours ==
- Limerick Premier Intermediate Hurling Championship (1): 2014
- Limerick Intermediate Hurling Championship (2): 1989, 2008
- Limerick Junior A Football Championship (2): 1987, 2008
- Munster Junior B Club Hurling Championship (1): 2022
- Limerick Junior B Hurling Championship (1): 2022
- Limerick Premier Under-21 Hurling Championship (1): 1992
- Limerick Premier Under-21 Football Championship (1): 2008
- Limerick Premier Minor Hurling Championship (3): 1941, 1983, 2022
- Limerick Premier Minor Football Championship (1): 1984

== Notable players ==
- Paul Browne: All-Ireland SHC-winner (2018)
- Seán Finn: All-Ireland SHC-winner (2018, 2020, 2021, 2022, 2023, 2026)
- Anthony O'Riordan: All-Ireland MHC-winning captain (1984)
