= 1887 Limerick Senior Hurling Championship =

Annual hurling competition season

- Champions: Murroe (1st title)
- Runners-up: South Liberties

The 1887 Limerick Senior Hurling Championship was the inaugural staging of the Limerick Senior Hurling Championship since its establishment by the Limerick County Board.

On 17 July 1887, Murroe won the championship following a 1–00 to 0–01 defeat of South Liberties in the final. This remains the club's only championship title.

== Results ==
=== Final ===
17 July 1887 Final	Murroe	1–00 – 0–01	South Liberties	Grocers Field, Limerick
				Referee: P O'Brien
