= Claughaun GAA =

Gaelic games club in County Limerick, Ireland

- CLG Clochán
- Founded: 1902
- County: Limerick
- Nickname: The Hoops
- Colours: Green and white
- Grounds: Childers Road
- Coordinates: 52°39′34″N 8°35′39″W

Playing kits
Standard colours

Senior Club Championships
	All Ireland	Munster champions	Limerick champions
Football:	0	0	14
Hurling:	0	0	10

Claughaun GAA (Irish: CLG Chlochán) is a Gaelic Athletic Association (GAA) club based in St Brigid's parish on the southside of Limerick City, Ireland. The club was founded in 1902, in the Poulin/Pennywell area of St John's parish. It fields teams in competitions organised by the within Limerick County Board and has won several county titles in both hurling and Gaelic football. The club grounds are located on the Childers Road. The club was relegated to intermediate status in both football and hurling following the 2010 championships. Clauaghaun returned to the Limerick Senior Football Championship after winning the 2020 Limerick Intermediate Football Championship.

== Name ==
The Irish name 'Clochán' is said to mean 'the place of the stepping stones', which referred to a small stream that flowed where the modern day Dublin Road lies, at Clare Street.

== Hurling ==
The club won its first Limerick Senior Hurling Championship in 1914, and went on the claim the title again in 1915, 1916, 1918 and 1926. In all Claughaun have won the SHC on ten occasions, the most recent title coming in 1986. They also won the IHC Final against South Liberties GAA in 2006.

=== Honours ===
- Limerick Senior Hurling Championship (10): 1914, 1915, 1916, 1918, 1926, 1957, 1958, 1968, 1971, 1986
- Limerick Minor Hurling Championship (8): 1946, 1956, 1961, 1962, 1978, 1981, 1986, 1991
- Limerick Under-21 Hurling Championship (3): 1981, 1984, 1987
- Limerick Intermediate Hurling Championship (1): 2006
- Limerick Junior Hurling Championship (4): 1904, 1912, 1918, 1929

=== Notable players ===
- Eamonn Cregan, Limerick senior hurler, won the All-Ireland Senior Hurling Championship with the county in 1973, after a commanding performance at centre half-back.
- Michael Cregan trained the 1973 Limerick team, whose panel also included Claughaun's Andy Dunworth and Mick Graham, the latter of whom missed much of the victorious campaign through injury.
- Mickey Cross, of Claughaun, won All-Ireland Senior Hurling titles in 1934 and 1936 with Limerick.
- Danny Fitzgerald won National Hurling League winner's medals in 1984 and 1985 with Limerick
- Mike Galligan won Munster Senior Hurling Championship medals in 1994 and 1996.
- Gus Ryan captained his county to the All-Ireland Under-21 Hurling Championship in 1987

== Gaelic football ==
Claughaun won the Limerick Senior Football Championship for the first time in 1955, and followed up with another 13 SFC title wins over the following four decades, the last in 1996.

=== Honours ===
- Limerick Senior Football Championship (14): 1955, 1959, 1967, 1969, 1970, 1971, 1982, 1984, 1986, 1988, 1989, 1993, 1995, 1996
- Limerick Minor Football Championship (6): 1946, 1956, 1961, 1962, 1973, 1985
- Limerick Junior Football Championship (2): 1945, 1972
- Limerick Under-21 Football Championship (2): 1980, 1982
- Limerick Intermediate Football Championship (1): 2020

=== Notable players ===
- Danny Fitzgerald represented Munster GAA in the Railway Cup in the 1980s.
- Eamonn Cregan was All Ireland winner 1973, Munster hurling championship winner, Railway Cup Winner and All Star, manager of all Ireland winners.
