= 2008 Limerick Senior Hurling Championship =

Annual hurling competition season

- Dates: 10 May – 19 October 2008
- Teams: 20
- Sponsor: Limerick's Live 95 FM
- Champions: Adare (4th title); Donncha Sheehan (captain); Ger O'Loughlin (manager)
- Runners-up: Ahane; Niall Moran (captain)
- Relegated: Dromin/Athlacca

Tournament statistics
- Matches played: 34
- Top scorer(s): Niall Moran (3–45)

The 2008 Limerick Senior Hurling Championship was the 114th staging of the Limerick Senior Hurling Championship since its establishment by the Limerick County Board in 1887. The draw for the opening round fixtures was made on 12 February 2008. The championship ran from 10 May to 19 October 2008.

Adare entered the championship as the defending champions.

The final was played on 19 October 2007 at the Gaelic Grounds in Limerick, between Adare and Ahane, in what was their second meeting in the final overall and a first final meeting in six years. Adare won the match by 0–13 to 0–08 to claim their fourth championship title overall and a second title in succession.

Ahane's Niall Moran was the championship's top scorer with 3–45.

== Team changes ==
=== To Championship ===
Promoted from the Limerick Intermediate Hurling Championship

- Dromin/Athlacca

=== From Championship ===
Relegated to the Limerick Intermediate Hurling Championship

- Killeedy

== Results ==
=== First round ===
10 May 2008 First round	Garryspillane	1–17 – 1–11	Tournafulla	Ballyagran Grounds
	Donie Ryan 0–10, TJ Ryan 1–1, V O'Connell 0–3, C Hickey 0–1, David Ryan 0–1, S Bourke 0–1.		N Horgan 1–2, JP Sheahan 0–3, P Browne 0–2, N Curtin 0–2, E O'Sullivan 0–1, C Brouder 0–1.

11 May 2008 First round	Western Gaels	2–16 – 3–18	Patrickswell	Bruff Grounds
	S Herlihy 1–6, J McCarthy 1–3, T McLoughlin 0–3, D Hanley 0–1, P Cremin 0–1, T Condon 0–1, D O'Sullivan 0–1.		B Foley 1–9, P O'Reilly 1–3, B Geoghegan 1–1, P Harty 0–2, J McDermott 0–1, W O'Dea 0–1, T O'Brien 0–1.

11 May 2008 First round	Adare	3–13 – 0–04	Claughaun	Bruff Grounds
	B Foley 1–5, D Sexton 2–0, W McNamara 0–3, M Foley 0–2, A O'Connell 0–1, M Clifford 0–1, P Keane 0–1.		M Fitzgerald 0–3, D Loughery 0–1.

16 May 2008 First round	Na Piarsaigh	2–08 – 1–14	Granagh-Ballingarry	FitzGerald Park
	K Downes 1–5, K Ryan 1–1, M Brougham 0–1, D Quigley 0–1.		D O'Connor 1–7, M Clancy 0–2, E Chawke 0–2, E Kennedy 0–1, S Stapleton 0–1, D Clancy 0–1.

17 May 2008 First round	Bruree	1–09 – 0–12	Murroe/Boher	Clarina Grounds
	S O'Halloran 0–4, T O'Brien 1–0, S Mullane 0–1, JC O'Brien 0–1, JV O'Brien 0–1, J O'Dea 0–1, P Kelly 0–1.		K Tobin 0–7, P McNamara 0–2, P Tobin 0–2, S Tobin 0–1.

18 May 2008 First round	Dromin/Athlacca	1–08 – 3–14	Doon	Fr Hayes Memorial Park
	R Ryan 1–1, P Neenan 0–2, E Benson 0–1, E O'Leary 0–1, B Kelleher 0–1, G Kelleher 0–1, J Kelleher 0–1.		M McKenna 2–2, N Maher 0–6, M Fitzgerald 1–1, J Ryan 0–2, D Anderson 0–1, G Allis 0–1, M Ryan 0–1.

18 May 2008 First round	Ahane	2–16 – 3–16	Kilmallock	Bruff Grounds
	N Moran 0–10, S O'Connor 2–0, B Healy 0–2, D Laing 0–2, S Madden 0–1, J Meskell 0–1.		G Mulcahy 1–5, A O'Shaughnessy 0–5, P O'Brien 1–1, S O'Donnell 1–0, B O'Sullivan 0–3, G O'Mahony 0–1, L Walsh 0–1.

18 May 2008 First round	Croom	2–15 – 1–11	Knockainey	Bruff Grounds
	M Cregan 2–1, S Cahill 0–7, J Barry 0–6, P Reidy 0–1.		P Kirby 1–9, B O'Shea 0–1, D Walsh 0–1.

29 May 2008 First round replay	Bruree	1–05 – 1–14	Murroe/Boher	Clarina Grounds
	M O'Brien 1–0, T O'Brien 0–2, JV O'Brien 0–1, S O'Halloran 0–1, M Lane 0–1.		K Tobin 0–5, S Tobin 1–1, P Tobin 0–4, P McNamara 0–2, J Butler 0–1, C Brouder 0–1.

=== Second round ===
==== Winners' round ====
27 June 2008 Winners round	Granagh-Ballingarry	2–15 – 0–15	Croom	FitzGerald Park
	D O'Connor 0–6, M Clancy 1–1, E Chawke 1–0, D O'Grady 0–3, E Kennedy 0–3, K O'Connor 0–1, N McCarthy 0–1.		J Barry 0–9, S Lucey 0–2, N O'Riordan 0–1, M O'Riordan 0–1, M Cregan 0–1, P Cregan 0–1.

27 June 2008 Winners round	Murroe/Boher	0–10 – 1–09	Adare	Gaelic Grounds
	K Tobin 0–7, J Butler 0–1, S Hickey 0–1.		M Foley 1–2, M Noonan 0–3, D Sheehan 0–2, P Keane 0–1, J Fitzgerald 0–1.

28 June 2008 Winners round	Kilmallock	3–13 – 0–20	Garryspillane	Bruff Grounds
	E Ryan 1–8, B O'Sullivan 1–1, P O'Dwyer 1–0, A O'Shaughnessy 0–2, B O'Sullivan 0–1, G Mulcahy 0–1.		TJ Ryan 0–11, Donie Ryan 0–2, J Ryan 0–2, M O'Brien 0–1, C Hickey 0–1, V O'Connell 0–1, B O'Connell 0–1, E Bourke 0–1.

28 June 2008 Winners round	Doon	1–16 – 0–15	Patrickswell	Bruff Grounds
	N Maher 0–10, M Ryan 1–0, D Moloney 0–2, G Allis 0–2, M McKenna 0–1, M Fitzgerald 0–1.		B Foley 0–7, D Foley 0–4, L Considine 0–1, Peter O'Reilly 0–1, Paul O'Reilly 0–1.

==== Losers' round ====
28 June 2008 Losers round	Dromin/Athlacca	0–10 – 1–17	Ahane	Fr Hayes Memorial Park
	P Neenan 0–5, G Costello 0–2, J Kelleher 0–2, T Ryan 0–1.		N Moran 0–7, P O'Connor 1–2, D Laing 0–5, S Madden 0–2, S O'Connor 0–1, J Meskell 0–1.

29 June 2008 Losers round	Tournafulla	3–13 – 2–13	Claughaun	FitzGerald Park
	E Moroney 0–6, P Ahern 1–1, N Curtin 0–4, N Horgan 1–0, C O'Connor 1–0, P Sheehan 0–1, JP Sheahan 0–1.		M Fitzgerald 0–8, D Lavery 1–1, P Judge 1–0, D Loughery 0–3, B Crofton 0–1.

29 June 2008 Losers round	Bruree	1–08 – 1–16	Na Piarsaigh	Bruff Grounds
	S O'Halloran 0–6, M O'Brien 1–0, T O'Brien 0–2.		K Downes 0–10, D Quigley 1–2, K Breen 0–1, P Kennedy 0–1, F McNamara 0–1, M Brougham 0–1.

29 June 2008 Losers round	Western Gaels	0–14 – 0–12	Knockainey	FitzGerald Park
	J McCarthy 0–4, S Herlihy 0–2, C Mullane 0–2, D O'Sullivan 0–1, T McLoughlin 0–1, D Quaid 0–1, J Riordan 0–1, D Cremin 0–1, D O'Callaghan 0–1.		P Kirby 0–9, B O'Shea 0–3.

=== Third round ===
9 August 2008 Third round	Ahane	2–21 – 0–19	Murroe/Boher	Childers Road
	N Moran 2–9, J Meskell 0–5, S O'Connor 0–3, D Laing 0–2, C Quirke 0–1, B Healy 0–1.		K Tobin 0–7, P Tobin 0–4, K McNamara 0–3, S Hickey 0–2, S Tobin 0–1, T O'Brien 0–1, D Brouder 0–1.

10 August 2008 Third round	Western Gaels	0–21 – 1–14	Croom	Ballyagran Grounds
	C Mullane 0–9, D Hanley 0–5, D Cremin 0–3, S Herlihy 0–2, R Hayes 0–1, D O'Sullivan 0–1.		M Cregan 0–4, N O'Riordan 1–0, J Barry 0–3, P Lawlor 0–2, P Cregan 0–2, M Cahill 0–1, P Cahill 0–1, C Allis 0–1.

10 August 2008 Third round	Patrickswell	2–22 – 0–11	Tournafulla	FitzGerald Park
	J McDermott 1–4, B Foley 0–7, Peter O'Reilly 1–3, T O'Brien 0–3, P O'Grady 0–3, L Considine 0–2.		E Moroney 0–4, E Sullivan 0–3, N Curtin 0–3, N Horgan 0–1.

10 August 2008 Third round	Garryspillane	1–16 – 1–12	Na Piarsaigh	FitzGerald Park
	TJ Ryan 1–10, S Bourke 0–2, Donie Ryan 0–1, Darren Hayes 0–1, David Ryan 0–1, Danny Hayes 0–1.		D Breen 0–7, K Ryan 1–1, D Quigley 0–3, M Brougham 0–1.

=== Relegation playoffs ===
10 August 2008 Semi-final	Claughaun	1–11 – 1–08	Bruree	Bruff Grounds
	I McNamara 1–1, D Loughery 0–4, S Mullally 0–3, M Fitzgerald 0–2, P McGarry 0–1.		S O'Halloran 0–5, P Kelly 1–1, B Hogan 0–1, JV O'Brien 0–1.

10 August 2008 Semi-final	Knockainey	2–14 – 1–06	Dromin/Athlacca	Bruff Grounds
	P McNamara 2–2, P Kirby 0–7, M Ryan 0–3, B O'Shea 0–1, N Finch 0–1, D Madden 0–1.		P Neenan 0–6, T Ryan 1–0.

14 September 2008 Final	Bruree	1–13 – 0–14	Dromin/Athlacca	Bruff Grounds
	T O'Brien 1–2, S O'Halloran 0–4, B Hogan 0–2, S Mullane 0–2, G O'Brien 0–1, P Kelly 0–1, JV O'Brien 0–1.		P Neenan 0–9, T Ryan 0–3, G O'Leary 0–1, E O'Leary 0–1.

=== Quarter-finals ===
13 September 2008 Quarter-final	Adare	1–11 – 0–13	Western Gaels	Newcastle West Grounds
	C Fitzgerald 0–6, D Sheehan 1–0, M Noonan 0–3, R Kennedy 0–1, W McNamara 0–1.		C Mullane 0–7, J McCarthy 0–3, T McLoughlin 0–1, D Sullivan 0–1, R Hayes 0–1.

13 September 2008 Quarter-final	Ahane	2–16 – 1–09	Doon	Fr Hayes Memorial Park
	N Moran 1–5, S Madden 1–4, D Laing 0–3, B Healy 0–2, P O'Connor 0–1, S O'Connor 0–1.		N Maher 0–6, M Ryan 1–0, M McKenna 0–2, R Ryan 0–1.

14 September 2008 Quarter-final	Kilmallock	3–12 – 1–12	Patrickswell	FitzGerald Park
	A O'Shaughnessy 0–7, G Mulcahy 2–0, G O'Sullivan 1–0, J Kelly 0–2, P O'Dwyer 0–1, B O'Sullivan 0–1, P O'Brien 0–1.		B Foley 1–10, W O'Dea 0–1, P O'Reilly 0–1.

14 September 2008 Quarter-final	Garryspillane	2–09 – 1–10	Granagh-Ballingarry	FitzGerald Park
	Donie Ryan 1–2, C Hickey 1–1, TJ Ryan 0–4, S Bourke 0–1, P Tobin 0–1		E Chawke 0–7, D Clancy 1–0, D O'Grady 0–2, E Kennedy 0–1.

=== Semi-finals ===
28 September 2008 Semi-final	Ahane	1–17 – 0–17	Garryspillane	Gaelic Grounds
	N Moran 0–9, S O'Connor 1–1, P O'Connor 0–3, F Aherne 0–1, D Laing 0–1, S Madden 0–1, C Joyce-Power 0–1.		TJ Ryan 0–7, David Ryan 0–2, T Ryan 0–2, P Tobin 0–2, C Hickey 0–1, T O'Donnell 0–1, E Bourke 0–1, B O'Donnell 0–1.

28 September 2008 Semi-final	Adare	1–12 – 2–08	Kilmallock	Gaelic Grounds
	C Fitzgerald 0–5, B Foley 1–0, M Noonan 0–2, P Keane 0–1, A O'Rahilly 0–1, W McNamara 0–1, D Sheehan 0–1, A O'Connell 0–1.		J Kelly 1–0, B O'Sullivan 1–0, E Ryan 0–3, A O'Shaughnessy 0–3, G Mulcahy 0–1, C O'Dwyer 0–1.

=== Final ===
19 October 2008 Final	Adare	0–13 – 0–08	Ahane	Gaelic Grounds
	C Fitzgerald 0–7 (0–5 frees); D Sheehan 0–3; L Costello 0–2; M Noonan 0–1.	Report	N Moran 0–5 (0–3 frees, 0–2 65’s); P O’Connor, S Madden, B Healy, 0–1 each.	Referee: D Enright (Dromin-Athlacca)

== Championship statistics ==
=== Top scorers ===
Overall

Rank	Player	Club	Tally	Total	Matches	Average
1	Niall Moran	Ahane	3–45	54	6	9.00
2	Barry Foley	Patrickswell	2–33	39	4	9.75
2	T. J. Ryan	Garryspillane	2–33	39	5	7.80
4	Patrick Kirby	Knockainey	1–25	28	3	9.33
5	Kevin Tobin	Murroe/Boher	0–26	26	4	6.50
6	Niall Maher	Doon	0–22	22	3	7.33
7	Paul Neenan	Dromin/Athlacca	0–22	22	4	5.50
8	Stephen O'Halloran	Bruree	0–20	20	5	4.00
9	Donie Ryan	Garryspillane	1–15	18	4	4.50
9	Kevin Downes	Na Piarsaigh	1–15	18	2	9.00
9	Conor Fitzgerald	Adare	0–18	18	3	6.00
9	Cathal Mullane	Western Gaels	0–18	18	3	6.00
9	John Barry	Croom	0–18	18	3	6.00

Single game

Rank	Player	Club	Tally	Total	Opposition
1	Niall Moran	Ahane	2–09	15	Murroe/Boher
2	T. J. Ryan	Garryspillane	1–10	13	Na Piarsaigh
2	Barry Foley	Patrickswell	1–10	13	Kilmallock
4	Barry Foley	Patrickswell	1–09	12	Western Gaels
4	Patrick Kirby	Knockainey	1–09	12	Croom
6	Eoin Ryan	Kilmallock	1–08	11	Garryspillane
6	T. J. Ryan	Garryspillane	0–11	11	Kilmallock
8	Denis O'Connor	Granagh-Ballingarry	1–07	10	Na Piarsaigh
8	Niall Maher	Doon	0–10	10	Dromin/Athlacca
8	Kevin Downes	Na Piarsaigh	0–10	10	Bruree
8	Niall Moran	Ahane	0–10	10	Kilmallock
8	Donie Ryan	Garryspillane	0–10	10	Tournafulla

=== Miscellaneous ===
- Doon recorded their first ever championship win over Patrickswell.
