= 2007 Limerick Senior Hurling Championship =

Annual hurling competition season

- Dates: 20 May – 11 November 2007
- Teams: 16
- Sponsor: Limerick's Live 95 FM
- Champions: Adare (3rd title); Donncha Sheehan (captain); Ger O'Loughlin (manager)
- Runners-up: Croom; Hugh Flavin (captain); Liam O'Donoghue (manager)
- Relegated: Killeedy

Tournament statistics
- Matches played: 31
- Goals scored: 75 (2.42 per match)
- Points scored: 830 (26.77 per match)
- Top scorer: Andrew O'Shaughnessy (3–32)

The 2007 Limerick Senior Hurling Championship was the 113th staging of the Limerick Senior Hurling Championship since its establishment by the Limerick County Board in 1887. The championship ran from 20 May to 11 November 2007.

Bruree entered the championship as the defending champions, however, they were beaten by Claughaun in the third round. Killeedy were relegated.

The final was played on 11 November 2007 at the Gaelic Grounds in Limerick, between Adare and Croom, in what was their first ever meeting in the final. Adare won the match by 0–14 to 0–05 to claim their third championship title overall and a first title in five years.

Kilmallock's Andrew O'Shaughnessy was the championship's top scorer with 3–32.

== Results ==
=== First round ===
20 May 2007 First round	Murroe/Boher	2–18 – 1–17	Patrickswell	Bruff Grounds
	K Tobin 0–9, S Tobin 2–2, P Tobin 0–3, D Kett 0–1, P McNamara 0–1.		B Foley 0–7, B Murray 1–1, B Geoghegan 0–3, W O'Dea 0–2, P O'Reilly 0–2, P O'Grady 0–1, T O'Brien 0–1.

20 May 2007 First round	Claughaun	4–08 – 1–13	Knockainey	FitzGerald Park
	D Loughrey 1–4, S Mullally 1–1, P Judge 1–0, A Kerley 1–0, A Healy 0–1, E Harty 0–1, K Holmes 0–1.		P Kirby 0–7, B O'Shea 1–1, M Ryan 1–1, P Davern 0–2, K Madden 0–1, N Finch 0–1.

20 May 2007 First round	Ahane	2–11 – 2–10	Doon	Cappamore Grounds
	J Moran 1–1, J Meskell 0–4, T Flynn 1–0, C Quirke 0–3, D Lang 0–2, O Moran 0–1.		M Ryan 1–1, M Fitzgerald 0–4, M McKenna 0–4, P Coleman 1–0, T Treacy 0–1.

20 May 2007 First round	Croom	1–17 – 1–12	Killeedy	Newcastle West
	J Barry 0–5, H Flavin 0–4, M Cregan 0–4, N Cregan 1–0, P Lawlor 0–3, P Cregan 0–1.		J Kelleher 1–8, D Cremin 0–1, C Deely 0–1, C Mullane 0–1,

27 May 2007 First round	Granagh-Ballingarry	0–14 – 1–09	Bruree	FitzGerald Park
	D O'Connor 0–6, E Chawke 0–4, E Kennedy 0–3, M Clancy 0–1.		M Lane 1–1, S O'Halloran 0–3, T O'Brien 0–2, J V O'Brien 0–1, S Mullane 0–1, J C O'Brien 0–1.

27 May 2007 First round	Adare	2–16 – 1–07	Na Piarsaigh	Mugret Grounds
	C Fitzgerald 0–9, W McNamara 1–2, L Costello 1–2, D Sexton 0–2, N Mulvihill 0–1.		K Ryan 1–3, C Sherlock 0–2, B Hartnett 0–1, D Quigley 0–1.

27 May 2007 First round	Kilmallock	1–17 – 1–12	Garryspillane	Bruff Grounds
	A O'Shaughnessy 1–7, E Ryan 0–4, K Kennelly 0–2, K O'Dwyer 0–2, P O'Dwyer 0–1, G O'Mahony 0–1.		TJ Ryan 1–8, D Ryan 0–2, E Bourke 0–2.

27 May 2007 First round	Tournafulla	1–08 – 0–11	Geraldines	FitzGerald Park
	N Curtin 1–5, P Ahern 0–1, C O'Connor 0–1, O O'Sullivan 0–1.		M Keane 0–10, M Ryan 0–1.

7 June 2007 First round replay	Geraldines	2–17 – 3–09	Tournafulla	FitzGerald Park
	R O'Neill 1–4, M Keane 0–5, M McCarthy 1–1, A Brennan 0–2, S O'Neill 0–2, D O'Neill 0–1, M Wilkinson 0–1, G Murphy 0–1.		JP Sheehan 1–7, P Browne 1–1, G O'Connor 1–0.

=== Second round ===
==== Winners Group ====
15 September 2007 Winners group	Adare	4–15 – 1–14	Geraldines	Gaelic Grounds
	C Fitzgerald 1–8, D Sheehan 1–2, D Sexton 1–2, B Foley 1–1, N Mulvihill 0–1, A O'Connell 0–1.		M Keane 1–9, D O'Neill 0–2, L Cronin 0–1, M McCarthy 0–1, R O'Neill 0–1.

15 September 2007 Winners group	Croom	1–12 – 0–14	Ahane	Gaelic Grounds
	M Cregan 1–3, N Cregan 0–3, H Flavin 0–1, J Cahill 0–1, J Barry 0–1, P Cregan 0–1, P Lawlor 0–1, S Cahill 0–1.		D Laing 0–4, J Moran 0–3, S O'Connor 0–3, N Moran 0–3, J Meskell 0–1.

16 September 2007 Winners group	Granagh-Ballingarry	1–11 – 0–08	Claughaun	Bruff Grounds
	E Chawke 1–2, D O'Connor 0–4, B Hanley 0–2, P Kennedy 0–1, E Kennedy 0–1, M Clancy 0–1.		D Loughrey 0–4, J O'Reilly 0–1, S Mullally 9–1, D Geary 0–1, K Holmes 0–1.

16 September 2007 Winners group	Murroe/Boher	1–14 – 0–14	Kilmallock	Gaelic Grounds
	K Tobin 0–8, S Tobin 1–3, D Kett 0–1, P McNamara 0–1, A Kirby 0–1.		A O'Shaughnessy 0–7, P O'Brien 0–2, L Walsh 0–2, E Ryan 0–1, G Mulcahy 0-, P O'Dwyer 0–1.

==== Losers Group ====
11 August 2007 Winners group	Na Piarsaigh	2–15 – 1–10	Killeedy	FitzGerald Park
	D Quigley 2–2, K Ryan 0–8, S O'Neill 0–2, C King 0–1, G Leonard 0–1, M Brougham 0–1.

16 September 2007 Winners group	Patrickswell	3–15 – 1–16	Garryspillane	Bruff Grounds
	B Geoghegan 2–2, J McDermott 1–2, B Foley 0–5, T O'Brien 0–3, T Sheehan 0–1, P O'Grady 0–1, P O'Reilly 0–1.		TJ Ryan 1–10, D Ryan 0–2, C Hickey 0–1, T O'Donnell 0–1, B O'Donnell 0–1, P Hyland 0–1.

16 September 2007 Winners group	Knockainey	1–18 – 1–10	Doon	Gaelic Grounds
	P Kirby 0–12, C Madden 1–0, D Walsh 0–3, P Davern 0–2, M Ryan 0–1.		M Fitzgerald 0–6, P Coleman 1–0, J Ryan 0–1, B Crowe 0–1, D Anderson 0–1, N Maher 0–1.

16 September 2007 Winners group	Bruree	5–12 – 1–06	Tournafulla	Dromcollogher Grounds
	M Lane 3–5, J O'Dea 2–1, G O'Brien 0–3, S O'Halloran 0–2, C O'Brien 0–1.		JP Sheahan 0–4, E Lenihan 1–0, N Collins 0–2.

=== Relegation playoffs ===
22 September 2007 Semi-final	Tournafulla	1–17 – 3–09	Killeedy	Newcastle West Grounds

23 September 2007 Semi-final	Doon	0–13 – 0–13	Garryspillane	Gaelic Grounds

4 November 2007 Semi-final replay	Garryspillane	2–09 – 1–11	Doon	Bruff Grounds
	TJ Ryan 1–7, J Sheehan 1–1, P Hyland 0–1.		M Fitzgerald 0–4, N Maher 1–0, M McKenna 0–2, G Allis 0–2, R Ryan 0–2, D Anderson 0–1.

11 November 2007 Final	Killeedy	1–04 – 0–17	Doon	FitzGerald Park
	J Kelleher 1–1, C Deely 0–1, S Kelly 0–1, R Hayes 0–1.		M Fitzgerald 0–9, G Allis 0–2, D Anderson 0–2, R Ryan 0–1, J O'Brien 0–1, M McKenna 0–1, N Maher 0–1.

=== Third round ===
22 September 2007 Third round	Ahane	2–20 – 0–07	Knockainey	Gaelic Grounds
	N Moran 0–10, S O'Connor 1–4, B Healy 1–1, D Lang 0–2, P O'Connor 0–1, J Moran 0–1, S Madden 0–1.		P Kirby 0–6, T Moloney 0–1.

23 September 2007 Third round	Geraldines	1–22 – 1–17	Na Piarsaigh	Bruff Grounds
	M Keane 0–7, A Brennan 1–2, J Deere 0–4, L O'Dwyer 0–2, M McCarthy 0–2, D O'Neill 0–2, A Shanahan 0–1, M Wilkinson 0–1, L Cronin 0–1.		K Ryan 1–9, D Breen 0–3, S O'Neill 0–3, J Fitzgerald 0–1, K Breen 0–1.

23 September 2007 Third round	Claughaun	0–11 – 0–08	Bruree	Bruff Grounds
	D Loughrey 0–5, I McNamara 0–1, E Harty 0–1, K Holmes 0–1, P Judge 0–1, S Mullally 0–1.		S O'Halloran 0–4, G O'Brien 0–1, J C O'Brien 0–1, B Hogan 0–1, J V O'Brien 0–1.

23 September 2007 Third round	Kilmallock	2–16 – 1–11	Patrickswell	Gaelic Grounds
	A O'Shaughnessy 0–9, G O'Mahony 1–2, P Connery 1–2, L Walsh 0–2, E Ryan 0–1.		B Foley 0–6, B Geoghegan 1–0, D Foley 0–2, T Sheehan 0–1, J McDermott 0–1, W O'Dea 0–1.

=== Quarter finals ===
6 October 2007 Quarter-final	Adare	1–16 – 1–15	Ahane	Gaelic Grounds
	D Sheehan 1–2, C Fitzgerald 0–5, A O'Connell 0–3, B Foley 0–2, L Costello 0–1, W McNamara 0–1, M Noonan 0–1, D Sexton 0–1.		N Moran 0–9, S O'Connor 0–4, B Healy 1–0, S Madden 0–1, K Berkery 0–1.

7 October 2007 Quarter-final	Murroe/Boher	1–13 – 0–11	Claughaun	FitzGerald Park
	J Butler 1–2, S Tobin 0–3, P McNamara 0–2, K Tobin 0–2, P Tobin 0–2, P Laffan 0–1, C Brouder 0–1.		D Loughrey 0–3, P McGarry 0–2, B Crofton 0–2, I McNamara 0–1, S Mullally 0–1, P Judge 0–1, E Harty 0–1.

7 October 2007 Quarter-final	Croom	0–20 – 1–11	Geraldines	FitzGerald Park
	M Cregan 0–9, S Cahill 0–3, S Moore 0–2, J Cahill 0–2, P Cregan 0–1, H Flavin 0–1, M O'Riordan 0–1, J Barry 0–1.		M Keane 0–8, J Deere 1–2, D O'Neill 0–1.

7 October 2007 Quarter-final	Kilmallock	3–22 – 0–15	Grangh-Ballingarry	Gaelic Grounds
	P Connery 2–1, A O'Shaughnessy 1–3, L Walsh 0–5, P O'Brien 0–3, E Ryan 0–3, G O'Mahoney 0–2, G Mulcahy 0–2, R Murphy 0–1, G O'Sullivan 0–1, K O'Dwyer 0–1.		D O'Connor 0–6, D O'Grady 0–2, E Chawke 0–2, D Clancy 0–1, E Kennedy 0–1, S Stapleton 0–1, P Carroll 0–1, P Kennedy 0–1.

=== Semi finals ===
Semi-final	Adare	0–24 – 2–08	Murroe/Boher	Gaelic Grounds
	C Fitzgerald 0–9, W McNamara 0–4, B Foley 0–3, A Rahilly 0–2, L Costello 0–2, M Noonan 0–2, D Sheehan 0–1, M Lyons 0–1.		K Tobin 1–4, S Tobin 1–1, P Tobin 0–2, S Hickey 0–1.

21 October 2007 Semi-final	Croom	1–13 – 1–08	Kilmallock	Gaelic Grounds
	M Cregan 0–6, S Moore 1–1, H Flavin 0–2, J Barry 0–2, S Cahill 0–1, P Cregan 0–1.		A O'Shaughnessy 1–6, L Walsh 0–1, E Ryan 0–1.

=== Final ===
11 November 2007 Final	Adare	0–14 – 0–05	Croom	Gaelic Grounds
	D Sheehan, 0–5 (0-1f), L Costello, 0–3, M Noonan, 0–2, M Foley (f) C Fitzgerald, B Foley, A O'Connell, 0–1 each.	Report	M Riordan, P Lawlor, S Cahill, S Moore, J. Barry (f) all 0–1.	Referee: M O'Connor (Na Piarsaigh)
