= 2006 Limerick Senior Hurling Championship =

Annual hurling competition season

- Dates: 25 May – 15 October 2006
- Teams: 16
- Sponsor: Limerick's Live 95 FM
- Champions: Bruree (2nd title); Stephen McDonagh (captain); John Tuohy (manager)
- Runners-up: Patrickswell; Barry Foley (captain); John O'Brien (manager)
- Relegated: Dromin/Athlacca; Monaleen

Tournament statistics
- Matches played: 31
- Top scorer(s): Kevin Tobin (3–37)

The 2006 Limerick Senior Hurling Championship was the 112th staging of the Limerick Senior Hurling Championship since its establishment by the Limerick County Board in 1887. The championship ran from 25 May to 15 October 2006.

Garryspillane entered the championship as the defending champions, however, they were beaten by Granagh-Ballingarry in the third round. Dromin/Athlacca and Monaleen were relegated.

The final was played on 15 October 2006 at the Gaelic Grounds in Limerick, between Bruree and Patrickswell, in what was their second meeting in the final overall and a first final meeting in 24 years. Bruree won the match by 1–16 to 1–15 to claim their second championship title overall and a first title in 113 years.

Murroe-Boher's Kevin Tobin was the championship's top scorer with 3–37.

== Format change ==
For the third year in succession, a new format was introduced. The group stages were abolished in favour of a double-elimination format.

- First round: The 16 teams were drawn against each other. The eight winning teams progressed to the second round winners group. The eight losing teams progressed to the second round losers group.
- Second round (winners group): The eight teams were drawn against each other. The four winning teams progressed to the quarter-finals. The four losing teams progressed to the third round.
- Second round (losers group): The eight teams were drawn against each other. The four winning teams progressed to the third round. The four losing teams progressed to the relegation playoffs.
- Relegation playoffs: The four teams were drawn against each other. The two losing teams were relegated from the championship.
- Third round: The eight teams were drawn against each other. The four winning teams progressed to the quarter-finals. The four losing teams were eliminated from the championship.
- Quarter-finals: The eight teams were drawn against each other. The four winning teams progressed to the semi-finals. The four losing teams were eliminated from the championship.
- Semi-finals: The four teams were drawn against each other. The two winning teams progressed to the semi-finals. The two losing teams were eliminated from the championship.
- Final: The two teams played each other to determine the champions.

== Team changes ==
=== To Championship ===
Promoted from the Limerick Intermediate Hurling Championship:

- Granagh-Ballingarry

=== From Championship ===
Relegated to the Limerick Intermediate Hurling Championship:

- Ballybrown

== Results ==
=== First round ===
25 May 2006 First round	Doon	1–08 – 2–14	Bruree	Gaelic Grounds
	M Fitzgerald 1–5, D Ryan 0–1, R Ryan 0–1, D Anderson 0–1.		G O'Brien 1–8, JV O'Brien 1–0, M Lane 0–3, D Lenihan 0–2, S O'Halloran 0–1.

28 May 2006 First round	Croom	2–16 – 2–11	Granagh-Ballingarry	FitzGerald Park
	M Lenihan 2–2, M Flavin 0–4, P Lawlor 0–3, S Lucey 0–2, N Riordan 0–2, T Carmody 0–2, N Cregan 0–1.		Stephen Stapleton 1–1, M Clancy 1–1, D O'Grady 0–3, K O'Connor 0–2, P Kennedy 0–1, O Chawke 0–1, B Hanley 0–1, Séamus Stapleton 0–1.

28 May 2006 First round	Ahane	1–15 – 1–12	Adare	Gaelic Grounds
	S O'Connor 1–2, N Moran 0–5, B Healy 0–3, J Meskell 0–2, D Laing 0–2, M Ahern 0–1.		C Fitzgerald 0–8, S O'Connell 1–0, M Foley 0–3, M Noonan 0–1.

28 May 2006 First round	Garryspillane	1–16 – 1–08	Dromin/Athlacca	Bruff Grounds
	Donie Ryan 1–4, F Carroll 0–6, C Hickey 0–3, M O'Brien 0–1, TJ Ryan 0–1, P Hyland 0–1.		P Neenan 1–8, J Kelleher 0–1, D Moynihan 0–1, M Cunneen 0–1.

28 May 2006 First round	Patrickswell	3–16 – 1–08	Killeedy	FitzGerald Park
	W O'Dea 1–3, B Foley 0–5, P O'Grady 1–1, P O'Reilly 1–1, D O'Grady 0–3, E Foley 0–1, J McDermott 0–1, T Sheehan 0–1.		C Mullane 0–6, J Hayes 1–0, P Dore 0–1, DJ Hayes 0–1.

28 May 2006 First round	Na Piarsaigh	1–11 – 0–12	Tournafulla	Páirc na nGael
	D Breen 1–9, K Bermingham 0–1, K Ryan 0–1.		N Curtin 0–8, N Collins 0–2, M Hogan 0–1, JP Sheahan 0–1.

28 May 2006 First round	Murroe-Boher	3–16 – 1–09	Monaleen	St Patrick's Grounds
	K Tobin 0–10, J Butler 1–3, P Tobin 1–2, T O'Brien 1–0, D Kitt 0–1.		P Russell 0–8, A Kitson 1–0, B Geary 0–1.

28 May 2006 First round	Kilmallock	1–11 – 0–14	Knockainey	Bruff Grounds
	K O'Dwyer 0–7, E Ryan 1–0, A O'Shaughnessy 0–2, S Burchill 0–1, P O'Dwyer 0–1.		P Kirby 0–4, M Ryan 0–3, P Davoren 0–2, E Mulcahy 0–2, B O'Shea 0–1, K Madden 0–1, M Cleary 0–1.

3 June 2006 First round replay	Kilmallock	2–18 – 1–15	Knockainey	Bruff Grounds
	A O'Shaughnessy 1–4, G O'Mahony 1–3, K O'Dwyer 0–3, P O'Dwyer 0–3, E Ryan 0–2, D O'Mahony 0–1, P Connery 0–1, S Burchill 0–1.		P Kirby 0–12, W O'Brien 1–0, E Mulcahy 0–1, D Madden 0–1, M Ryan 0–1.

=== Second round winners group ===
30 July 2006 Winners group	Ahane	4–14 – 1–05	Na Piarsaigh	Gaelic Grounds
	N Moran 2–5, J Moran 1–3, C Quirke 1–1, J Meskell 0–2, D Laing 0–1, S O'Connor 0–1, B Healy 0–1.		D Hennessy 1–2, K Ryan 0–1, D Breen 0–1, S O'Neill 0–1.

30 July 2006 Winners group	Croom	2–18 – 3–08	Murroe-Boher	FitzGerald Park
	H Flavin 1–4, P Cregan 0–6, T Carmody 0–4, P Cahill 1–0, P Lawlor 0–2, S Lucey 0–1, N Cregan 0–1.		K Tobin 2–6, T O'Brien 1–0, P Tobin 0–2.

30 July 2006 Winners group	Kilmallock	2–10 – 1–11	Bruree	Bruff Grounds
	A O'Shaughnessy 2–2, P O'Dwyer 0–4, P Connolly 0–2, G O'Mahony 0–1, E Ryan 0–1.		B Hogan 1–2, JV O'Brien 0–3, G O'Brien 0–2, S O'Halloran 0–1, D Lenihan 0–1, E Morrissey 0–1, S Mullane 0–1.

30 July 2006 Winners group	Garryspillane	1–10 – 3–10	Patrickswell	Bruff Grounds
	Donie Ryan 1–3, Dave Ryan 0–3, B O'Donnell 0–1, M O'Brien 0–1, F Nolan 0–1, P Hyland 0–1.		B Foley 2–5, J McDermott 1–0, D O'Grady 0–2, P O'Reilly 0–1, E Foley 0–1, C Carey 0–1.

=== Second round losers group ===
28 July 2006 Losers group	Doon	2–14 – 3–09	Adare	Gaelic Grounds
	M Fitzgerald 2–8, M McKenna 0–4, J Ryan 0–1, P Coleman 0–1.		C Fitzgerald 1–6, D Butler 1–0, M Foley 1–0, S Lavin 0–2, B Foley 0–1.

28 July 2006 Losers group	Granagh-Ballingarry	0–16 – 0–12	Dromin/Athlacca	Páirc Caoimhín Ó Luing
	D O'Connor 0–7, S Stapleton 0–3, M Clancy 0–1, P Kennedy 0–1.		P Neenan 0–7, T Ryan 0–3, M Cunneen 0–1, G Costello 0–1.

28 July 2006 Losers group	Tournafulla	5–12 – 1–18	Monaleen	Ballyagran Grounds
	P Browne 3–2, N Curtin 0–7, M Horgan 1–1, J Moroney 1–0, JP Sheehan 0–2.		P Russell 0–9, A Kitson 1–1, D Cosgrave 0–2, N Macken 0–2, J Cormican 0–1, M Doyle 0–1, F Kenzie 0–1, D Foley 0–1.

28 July 2006 Losers group	Killeedy	3–13 – 0–11	Knockainey	FitzGerald Park
	J Kelleher 2–2, C Mullane 0–4, M Barry 1–0, J Fitzmaurice 0–2, L McEnery 0–2, E O'Connor 0–2, D Cronin 0–1.		D Walsh 0–4, P Davoren 0–3, M Ryan 0–2, B O'Shea 0–1, K Madden 0–1.

=== Relegation playoffs ===
11 August 2006 Playoff	Adare	2–19 – 0–04	Monaleen	Mungret Grounds
	C Fitzgerald 1–8, D Butler 1–1, D Sheehan 0–2, S Lavin 0–2, B Foley 0–2, M Noonan 0–1, W McNamara 0–1, M Foley 0–1, A O'Connell 0–1.		F Kenzie 0–1, P Russell 0–1, D Foley 0–1, S Mullane 0–1.

1 September 2006 Playoff	Knockainey	3–12 – 0–14	Dromin/Athlacca	Bruff Grounds
	P Davoren 0–7, M Ryan 1–2, D O'Brien 1–0, B O'Shea 1–0, P Kirby 0–2, K Madden 0–1.		P Neenan 0–9, J Kelleher 0–3, O Benson 0–1, M Walsh 0–1.

=== Third round ===
11 August 2006 Third round	Doon	1–16 – 1–13	Na Piarsaigh	Gaelic Grounds
	M Fitzgerald 1–10, D Anderson 0–3, J Bradshaw 0–2, R Maher 0–1.		D Breen 0–7, C Minihane 1–1, C Sherlock 0–3, S O'Neill 0–1, D Hennessy 0–1.

12 August 2006 Third round	Murroe-Boher	2–16 – 0–07	Killeedy	FitzGerald Park
	P Tobin 1–4, K Tobin 0–6, P Laffan 1–1, S Hickey 0–2, M Butler 0–2, J O'Brien 0–1.		C Mullane 0–4, J Kelleher 0–2, P Cremins 0–1.

13 August 2006 Third round	Bruree	2–12 – 2–08	Tournafulla	Páirc Caoimhín Ó Luing
	J O'Brien 1–2, G O'Brien 1–1, S O'Halloran 0–4, E Morrissey 0–2, M Lane 0–2, B Hogan 0–1.		P Browne 1–2, JP Sheehan 1–1, N Curtin 0–3, P Sheehan 0–1, M Horgan 0–1.

13 August 2006 Third round	Granagh-Ballingarry	3–11 – 2–13	Garryspillane	FittzGerald Park
	D O'Connor 3–7, M Clancy 0–3, O Kennedy 0–1.		D Ryan 2–3, F Carroll 0–4, P Tobin 0–2, O Burke 0–2, J Ryan 0–1, P Hyland 0–1.

=== Quarter-finals ===
2 September 2006 Quarter-final	Bruree	2–11 – 0–11	Granagh-Ballingarry	Páirc Caoimhín Ó Luing
	G O'Brien 1–2, S O'Halloran 0–5, JV O'Brien 1–0, T O'Brien 0–2, M Lane 0–1, D Sexton 0–1.		P Kennedy 0–5, D O'Connor 0–3, D O'Grady 0–1, M Clancy 0–1, E Kennedy 0–1.

9 September 2006 Quarter-final	Croom	0–13 – 1–10	Murroe-Boher	Gaelic Grounds
	{ Cregan 0–4, J cahill 0–3, P Cahill 0–2, P Lawlor 0–1, M Cregan 0–1, H Flavin 0–1, T Carmody 0–1.		K Tobin 0–8, T O'Brien 1–0, P Laffan 0–1, J Butler 0–1.

10 September 2006 Quarter-final	Patrickswell	2–12 – 0–17	Kilmallock	Gaelic Grounds
	B Foley 0–6, Peter O'Reilly 1–2, P O'Grady 1–0, E Geary 0–3, D O'Grady 0–1.		A O'Shaughnessy 0–10, P O'Brien 0–3, E Ryan 0–2, B O'Sullivan 0–1, P O'Dwyer 0–1.

10 September 2006 Quarter-final	Doon	1–16 – 1–12	Ahane	Gaelic Grounds
	M McKenna 0–9, P Coleman 1–0, R Ryan 0–2, D Ryan 0–1, J Bradshaw 0–1, D Anderson 0–1, T Ryan 0–1, B Crowe 0–1.		N Moran 1–8, J Moran 0–2, O Moran 0–1, D Laing 0–1.

16 September 2006 Quarter-final replay	Croom	1–15 – 2–10	Murroe-Boher	Gaelic Grounds
	N Cregan 1–3, P Cregan 0–5, H Flavin 0–3, P Lawlor 0–2, M Lenihan 0–1, M Mangan 0–1.		K Tobin 1–7, P McNamara 1–1, P Tobin 0–1, T O'Brien 0–1.

=== Semi-finals ===
24 September 2006 Semi-final	Bruree	1–14 – 0–14	Doon	Gaelic Grounds
	S O'Halloran 1–9, JV O'Brien 0–4, JC O'Brien 0–1.		M McKenna 0–6, T Hayes 0–2, P Coleman 0–2, R Ryan 0–2, B Crowe 0–1, T Treacy 0–1.

24 September 2006 Semi-final	Patrickswell	3–11 – 1–16	Croom	Gaelic Grounds
	B Foley 0–6, T Sheehan 1–0, D O'Grady 1–0, W O'Dea 1–0, E Foley 0–3, Peter O'Reilly 0–1, P O'Grady 0–1.		H Flavin 1–5, T Carmody 0–3, P Lawlor 0–3, P Cregan 0–3, S Lucey 0–1, N Cregan 0–1.

=== Final ===
15 October 2006 Final	Bruree	1–16 – 1–15	Patrickswell	Gaelic Grounds
	S O’Halloran 0–11 (0–7 frees, 0–2 65’s); T O’Brien 1–0; G O’Brien 0–2; M Lane, JV O’Brien, M O’Brien, 0–1 each.	Report	B Foley 1–7 (0–4 frees); J McDermott 0–3; D O’Grady 0–2; E Foley, Paul O’Reilly, P O’Grady, 0–1 each.	Referee: D Richardson (Murroe-Boher)

== Championship statistics ==
=== Top scorers ===
Rank	Player	Club	Tally	Total	Matches	Average
1	Kevin Tobin	Murroe-Boher	3–37	46	5	9.20
2	Barry Foley	Patrickswell	3–29	38	5	7.60
3	Mike FitzGerald	Doon	4–23	35	3	11.66
4	Stephen O'Halloran	Bruree	1–31	34	6	5.66
5	Conor Fitzgerald	Adare	2–22	28	3	9.33
6	Niall Moran	Ahane	3–18	27	3	9.00
6	Andrew O'Shaughnessy	Kilmallock	3–18	27	4	6.75
8	Paul Neenan	Dromin/Athlacca	1–24	27	3	9.00
9	Denis O'Connor	Granagh-Ballingarry	3–37	26	3	8.66
10	Gerard O'Brien	Bruree	3–15	24	5	4.80

=== Miscellaneous ===
- Knockainey hurler, Willie O'Brien, died suddenly on the day before the club's relegation playoff with Dromin/Athlacca.
