= 2009 Limerick Senior Hurling Championship =

Annual hurling competition season

- Dates: 28 May – 18 October 2009
- Teams: 16
- Sponsor: Live 95fm
- Champions: Adare (5th title); Donncha Sheehan (captain); Ger O'Loughlin (manager)
- Runners-up: Na Piarsaigh; Pa Guinane (captain); Timmy O'Connor (manager)

The 2009 Limerick Senior Hurling Championship was the 115th staging of the Limerick Senior Hurling Championship since its establishment by the Limerick County Board in 1887. The draw for the opening round fixtures took place on 10 February 2009.

Adare entered the championship as the defending champions.

On 18 October 2009, Adare won the championship after a 1–17 to 0–03 defeat of Na Piarsaigh in the final. It was their fifth championship title overall and their third title in succession. It remains their last championship triumph.

== Team changes ==
=== To Championship ===
Promoted from the Limerick Intermediate Hurling Championship

- Bruff

=== From Championship ===
Relegated to the Limerick Intermediate Hurling Championship

- Dromin/Athlacca

== Results ==
=== Quarter-finals ===
13 September 2009 Quarter-final	Adare	2–16 – 2–11	Doon	Gaelic Grounds

13 September 2009 Quarter-final	Murroe/Boher	1–17 – 0–11	Patrickswell	Gaelic Grounds

19 September 2009 Quarter-final	Na Piarsaigh	1–14 – 1–05	Croom	Gaelic Grounds

24 September 2009 Quarter-final	Emmets	3–17 – 1–16	Ahane	Gaelic Grounds

=== Semi-finals ===
4 October 2009 Semi-final	Adare	1–14 – 1–10	Murroe/Boher	Gaelic Grounds
	D Hannon 0–6 (0–5 frees, 0–1 ‘65); D Sheehan 1–1; D Sexton 0–3; C Fitzgerald 0–2; L Costello and A O’Connell 0–1 each.	Report	K Tobin 0–6 frees; S Tobin 1–1; S Hickey 0–2; J Butler 0–1.

4 October 2009 Semi-final	Na Piarsaigh	4–16 – 2–20	Emmets	Gaelic Grounds
	D Breen 2–3, K Downes 1–6, K Ryan 1–4, S O'Neill 0–2, D Lynch 0–1.	Report	A McAuliffe 1–7, Donie Reale 1–3, Damien Moloney 0–5, R mcCarthy 0–1, B Moloney 0–1, E O'Leary 0–1, N Quaid 0–1, S Walsh 0–1.

=== Final ===
18 October 2009 Final	Adare	1–17 – 0–03	Na Piarsaigh	Gaelic Grounds
	D Sexton 1–3, D Sheehan 0–4, D Hannon 0–3 (0-1f), M Foley 0–2 (0-2f), B Foley, L Costello, W McNamara, J Fitzgibbon, A O'Connell 0–1 each	Report	K Downes 0–3 (0-2f)	Referee: P Coffey (Cappamore)
