= 2005 Limerick Senior Hurling Championship =

Annual hurling competition season

- Dates: 29 May – 16 October 2005
- Teams: 16
- Sponsor: Limerick's Live 95 FM
- Champions: Garryspillane (1st title); Davy Ryan (captain); Tony Considine (manager)
- Runners-up: Kilmallock; Ciarán O'Dwyer (captain); Phil Noonan (manager)
- Relegated: Ballybrown

Tournament statistics
- Matches played: 36
- Goals scored: 118 (3.28 per match)
- Points scored: 863 (23.97 per match)
- Top scorer(s): Andrew O'Shaughnessy (8–26)

The 2005 Limerick Senior Hurling Championship was the 111th staging of the Limerick Senior Hurling Championship since its establishment by the Limerick County Board in 1887. The championship ran from 29 May to 16 October 2005.

Ahane entered the championship as the defending champions, however, they surrendered their title after failing to qualify from the group stage. Ballybrown's relegation brought an end to 38 years of top tier hurling for the club.

The final was played on 16 October 2005 at the Gaelic Grounds in Limerick, between Garryspillane and Kilmallock, in what was their first ever meeting in the final. Garryspillane won the match by 2–15 to 2–12 to claim their first ever championship title.

Kilmallock's Andrew O'Shaughnessy was the championship's top scorer with 8–26.

== Format change ==
A new format was introduced which resulted in the abolition of the Limerick Senior B Hurling Championship after two years in existence. All 16 senior clubs now contested the A-grade competition. These teams were divided into four groups of four. After the group stage the top two teams in each group qualified for the quarter-finals. The bottom team in each group played off in a series of relegation matches.

== Group 1 ==
=== Group 1 table ===
Quarter-finalists

Team	Matches				Score			Pts
Team	Pld	W	D	L	For	Against	Diff	Pts
Murroe/Boher	3	3	0	0	69	39	30	6
Na Piarsaigh	3	1	1	1	47	47	0	3
Monaleen	3	0	2	0	47	57	−10	2
Killeedy	3	0	1	2	39	59	−20	1

=== Group 1 results ===
29 May 2005 Round 1	Murroe/Boher	2–14 – 1–07	Na Piarsaigh	FitzGerald Park
	K Tobin 1–8, P Tobin 1–1, P McNamara 0–3, J Butler 0–1, T O'Brien 0–1.		T Millea 1–0, D Breen 0–3, S O'Neill 0–2, D Hennessy 0–2.

3 June 2005 Round 1	Monaleen	2–09 – 2–09	Killeedy	Ballingarry Grounds
	P Russell 0–4, A Kitson 2–0, J Cormican 0–3, D Foley 0–1, S Mullane 0–1.		C Mullane 0–4, J Kelleher 1–0, T Magner 1–0, D Cremin 0–2, P Cremin 0–1, R Hayes 0–1, C Deely 0–1.

17 July 2005 Round 2	Murroe/Boher	3–13 – 1–09	Killeedy	Bruff Grounds
	K Tobin 0–6, J Butler 1–2, O O'Neill 1–1, P Tobin 1–1, D Brouder 0–2, P McNamara 0–1.		C Mullane 0–4, P Cremin 1–0, R Hayes 0–2, T Magnier 0–1, T McEnery 0–1, C Delee 0–1.

17 July 2005 Round 2	Monaleen	1–12 – 1–12	Na Piarsaigh	Gaelic Grounds
	P Russell 0–7, P O'Halloran 1–1, J Cormican 0–2, S Mullane 0–1, D Cosgrave 0–1.		D Breen 1–2, K Ryan 0–4, K Bermingham 0–2, S O'Neill 0–2, B Hartnett 0–1, D Hennessy 0–1.

13 August 2005 Round 3	Na Piarsaigh	1–19 – 0–12	Killeedy	Páirc na nGael
	D Hennessy 1–6.

14 August 2005 Round 3	Murroe/Boher	3–18 – 1–14	Monaleen	Fr Hayes Memorial Park
	P Tobin 2–4, E O'Neill 1–2, J Butler 0–4, T O'Brien 0–2, K Tobin 0–2, P Laffan 0–1, P McNamara 0–1, D Brouder 0–1, J O'Connor 0–1.		P Russell 0–6, M Gavin 1–0, J Cormican 0–3, S Mullane 0–3, P O'Halloran 0–1, D Foley 0–1.

== Group 2 ==
=== Group 2 table ===
Quarter-finalists

Team	Matches				Score			Pts
Team	Pld	W	D	L	For	Against	Diff	Pts
Kilmallock	3	3	0	0	70	46	24	6
Croom	3	1	0	2	42	44	−2	2
Bruree	3	1	0	2	44	47	−3	2
Knockainey	3	1	0	2	36	55	−19	2

=== Group 2 results ===
3 June 2005 Round 1	Kilmallock	3–10 – 2–10	Croom	Bruff Grounds
	A O'Shaughnessy 2–0, E Ryan 0–5, P Connery 1–0, D O'Mahony 0–3, D O'Shaughnessy 0–1, C O'Dwyer 0–1.		M Cregan 2–3, J Barry 0–4, M Cahill 0–1, P Lawlor 0–1, P Cregan 0–1.

14 June 2005 Round 1	Bruree	0–11 – 1–11	Knockainey	Ballyagran Grounds
	JV O’Brien 0–4, S O’ Connell 0–4, J O’ Brien, D Sexton and S O’ Halloran 0–1 each.		P Kirby 0–7, D O’ Brien 1–0, M Ryan, M Cleary, P Davern and P McNamara 0–1 each.

17 July 2005 Round 2	Kilmallock	5–15 – 1–08	Knockainey	Bruff Grounds
	A O'Shaughnessy 3–6, C O'Dwyer 1–2, M Houlihan 1–0, P O'Dwyer 0–2, E Ryan 0–2, P Connery 0–1, L Walsh 0–1, D O'Mahony 0–1.		D O'Brien 0–4, M Cleary 1–0, P Kirby 0–3, P Davern 0–1.

7 August 2005 Round 2	Bruree	2–08 – 2–06	Croom	Bruff Grounds
	S O'Connell 0–7, John O'Brien 1–0, JC O'Brien 1–0, JV O'Brien 0–1.		J Barry 1–1, M Cregan 1–1, P Cregan 0–1, H Flavin 0–1, N Cregan 0–1, P Brennan 0–1.

14 August 2005 Round 3	Croom	0–14 – 1–08	Knockainey	FitzGerald Park
	M Cregan 0–5, A McNamara 0–2, H Flavin 0–2, M Lenihan 0–2, N O'Riordan 0–1, K Cregan 0–1, P Cregan 0–1.		D O'Brien 1–2, P Kirby 0–5, M Cleary 0–1.

14 August 2005 Round 3	Kilmallock	2–15 – 3–10	Bruree	Bruff Grounds
	M Houlihan 1–3, A O'Shaughnessy 0–5, P O'Dwyer 1–1, E Ryan 0–2, G O'Mahony 0–2, K O'Dwyer 0–1, P Connery 0–1.		JV O'Brien 0–5, S O'Connell 0–4, JC O'Brien 1–0, M Lane 1–0, E Morrissey 1–0, S O'Halloran 0–1.

=== Group 2 playoffs ===
24 August 2005 Playoff	Bruree	1–09 – 1–07	Knockainey	Bruff Grounds
	James O'Brien 1–3, S O'Connell 0–2, C O'Brien 0–2, E Morrissey 0–1, A Sexton 0–1.		D O'Brien 0–6, P Kirby 1–0, M Ryan 0–1.

28 August 2005 Playoff	Croom	3–14 – 1–09	Bruree	FitzGerald Park
	P Cregan 0–5, M Lenihan 1–1, T Carmody 1–1, A McNamara 1–0, J Cahill 0–2, K Cregan 0–2, H Flavin 0–1, N O'Riordan 0–1,		John O'Brien 1–0, James O'Brien 0–3, C O'Brien 0–2, E Morrissey 0–2, James C O'Brien 0–1, D Sexton 0–1.

== Group 3 ==
=== Group 3 table ===
Quarter-finalists

Team	Matches				Score			Pts
Team	Pld	W	D	L	For	Against	Diff	Pts
Garryspillane	3	3	0	0	54	42	8	6
Patrickswell	3	2	0	1	54	40	14	4
Ahane	3	1	0	2	52	48	4	2
Ballybrown	3	0	0	3	43	73	−30	0

== Group 3 ==
=== Group 3 results ===
27 May 2005 Round 1	Patrickswell	4–12 – 1–09	Ballybrown	Gaelic Grounds
	B Foley 2–5, P. O’Grady 0–4, V O’Doherty, W Morrissey 1–0 each, D O’Grady 0–2, Peter O’Reilly 0–1.		A O’Connor 1–7, R Kennedy 0–2.

3 June 2005 Round 1	Ahane	1–11 – 2–09	Garryspillane	Gaelic Grounds
	J Meskell 0–5, S O'Connor 1–0, N Moran 0–3, O Moran 0–2, C Smith 0–1.		TJ Ryan 1–3, P Tobin 1–1, D Ryan 0–2, F Carroll 0–2, J Ryan 0–1.

15 July 2005 Round 2	Patrickswell	1–13 – 0–09	Ahane	Gaelic Grounds
	B Foley 1–3, P O'Grady 0–4, J McDermott 0–3, D O'Grady 0–1, K Carey 0–1, M Foley 0–1.		J Meskell 0–7, N Moran 0–1, C O'Reilly 0–1.

15 July 2005 Round 2	Garryspillane	3–11 – 1–11	Ballybrown	Bruff Grounds
	TJ Ryan 2–3, V O'Connell 1–0, F Carroll 0–3, Donie Ryan 0–2, D Ryan 0–1, C Hickey 0–1, P Hyland 0–1.		A O'Connor 1–9, I Burke 0–1, B Hartigan 0–1.

10 August 2005 Round 3	Ahane	2–23 – 2–11	Ballybrown	Gaelic Grounds
	J Meskall 1–8, P Ryan 1–1, N Moran 0–5, F Ahern, S O’Connor, O Moran 0–2 each, D O’Sullivan, C Riely, K Berkery 0–1 each.		A O’Connor 1–7, N Doolin 1–2, I Burke, B Hartigan 0–1 each.

14 August 2005 Round 3	Garryspillane	1–16 – 0–14	Patrickswell	Gaelic Grounds
	F Carroll 0–9, D Ryan 1–1, TJ Ryan 0–3, J Ryan 0–2, P Tobin 0–1.		B Foley 0–5, Peter O’Reilly, E Foley 0–3 each, V Doherty, P O’Grady 0–1 each.

== Group 4 ==
=== Group 4 table ===
Quarter-finalists

Team	Matches				Score			Pts
Team	Pld	W	D	L	For	Against	Diff	Pts
Adare	3	3	0	0	64	40	24	6
Tournafulla	3	2	0	1	50	58	−8	4
Doon	3	1	0	2	49	52	−3	2
Dromin/Athlacca	3	0	0	3	47	60	−13	0

=== Group 4 results ===
29 May 2005 Round 1	Doon	3–07 – 1–09	Dromin/Athlacca	Gaelic Grounds
	R Ryan 2–0, M Fitzgerald 0–4, D Stapleton 1–0, J Fox 0–1, D Moloney 0–1, G Allis 0–1.		G Costelloe 1–1, P Neenan 0–4, T Ryan 0–3 E O'Leary 0–1.

2 June 2005 Round 1	Adare	2–16 – 0–08	Tournafulla	Newcastle West
	D Sheehan 0–5, A O'Connell 1–1, B Foley 1–0, M Noonan 0–3, C Fitzgerald 0–3, B Sexton 0–3, S O'Connell 0–1.		N Curtin0-5, B Mulcahy 0–1, JP Sheahan 0–1, P Keogh 0–1.

24 July 2005 Round 2	Dromin/Athlacca	2–12 – 2–15	Tournafulla	Ballyagran Grounds
	P Neenan 0–7, D Walsh 1–0, E O'Leary 1–0, T Ryan 0–2, G O'Leary 0–1, G Kelleher 0–1, J Kelleher 0–1.		N Curtin 0–8, P Browne 1–1, P Keogh 1–0, JP Sheehan 0–2, M Horgan 0–2, P Sheehan 0–1, N Collins 0–1.

11 August 2005 Round 2	Adare	2–13 – 2–09	Doon	Gaelic Grounds
	D Sheehan 1–2, M Foley 0–5, A O'Rahilly 1–1, C Fitzgerald 0–3, B Foley 0–1, M Noonan 0–1.		M Fitzgerald 1–11, B Crowe 1–0.

14 August 2005 Round 3	Dromin/Athlacca	2–11 – 1–20	Adare	Ballingarry Grounds
	P Neenan 1–6, D Moynihan 1–0, O O'Leary 0–3, G Costello 0–1, D Walsh 0–1.		M Noonan 0–8, B Sexton 1–4, M Foley 0–5, D Sheehan 0–2, A O'Connell 0–1.

21 August 2005 Round 3	Doon	1–15 – 3–12	Tournafulla	FitzGerald Park
	M Fitzgerald 1–7, R Ryan 0–2, E Kiely 0–2, D Moloney 0–2, D Stapleton 0–1, J Ryan 0–1.		N Curtin 1–5, P Browne 1–2, A Fitzgerald 1–0 (og), P Sheahan 0–3, N Collins 0–1, P Keogh 0–1.

== Relegation playoffs ==
=== Relegation semi-finals ===
4 September 2005 Semi-final	Dromin/Athlacca	1–15 – 0–09	Ballybrown	FitzGerald Park
	P Neenan 0–9, J Kelleher 1–3, G Kelleher 0–2, D Moynihan 0–1.		A O'Connor 0–4, N Doolin 0–2, B Hartigan 0–1, I Burke 0–1, R Kenny 0–1.

8 September 2005 Semi-final	Killeedy	3–12 – 1–10	Knockainey	Ballyagran
	P McInerney 1–3, J Hayes 1–1, P Cremin 1–1, C Mullane 0–3, E O'Connor 0–3, D Flynn 0–1, T McInerney 0–1.		P Kirby 1–3, D O'Brien 0–4, P Davoren 0–1, C Mullane 0–1, P McInerney 0–1.

=== Relegation final ===
8 October 2005 Final	Knockainey	5–10 – 1–06	Ballybrown	Bruff Grounds
	P Kirby 1–5, D O'Brien 2–0, D Walsh 1–0, M Ryan 1–0, P Davern 0–2, K Madden 0–1, J Leo 0–1, P McNamara 0–1.		A O'Connor 1–3, N Doolin 0–2, J O'Connor 0–1.

== Knockout stage ==
=== Quarter-finals ===
28 August 2005 Quarter-final	Kilmallock	2–16 – 1–09	Na Piarsaigh	Gaelic Grounds
	A O'Shaughnessy 1–6, K O'Dwyer 1–1, M Houlihan 0–2, P O'Dwyer 0–2, E Ryan 0–2, P Connery 0–1, G O'Mahony 0–1, L Walsh 0–1.		K Ryan 1–3, D Hennessy 0–2, C Sherlock 0–2, S O'Neill 0–1, T Millea 0–1.

28 August 2005 Quarter-final	Garryspillane	1–20 – 2–10	Tournafulla	Ballyagran Grounds
	F Carroll 1–5, Donie Ryan 0–5, David Ryan 0–4, TJ Ryan 0–3, C Hickey 0–2, V O'Connell 0–1.		JP Sheehan 0–5, P Sheehan 1–1, N Curtin 0–4, N Horgan 1–0.

4 September 2005 Quarter-final	Croom	3–10 – 1–08	Murroe/Boher	Bruff Grounds
	M Lenihan 2–0, H Flavin 1–1, P Lawlor 0–2, J Carroll 0–2, P Cregan 0–2, T Carmody 0–2, B Crofton 0–1.		B Nolan 1–0, K Tobin 0–3, P McNamara 0–2, P Laffan 0–1, T O'Brien 0–1, E O'Neill 0–1.

4 September 2005 Quarter-final	Patrickswell	0–15 – 0–10	Adare	Gaelic Grounds
	B Foley 0–8, P O'Reilly 0–4, D O'Grady 0–1, T O'Brien 0–1, E Foley 0–1.		C Fitzgerald 0–7, M Foley 0–1, A O'Connell 0–1, C Cribben 0–1.

=== Semi-finals ===
18 September 2005 Semi-final	Garryspillane	4–16 – 1–20	Croom	Gaelic Grounds
	Donie Ryan 2–1, TJ yan 1–3, F Carroll 0–5, M O'Brien 1–0, David Ryan 0–3, P Tobin 0–2, J Ryan 0–1, V O'Connell 0–1.		P Cregan 0–9, T Carmody 1–1, H Flavin 0–4, J Carroll 0–3, J Barry 0–1, N O'Riordan 0–1, M Cregan 0–1.

18 September 2005 Semi-final	Kilmallock	2–15 – 1–16	Patrickswell	Gaelic Grounds
	A O'Shaughnessy 1–5, E Ryan 1–0, P Connery 0–3, M Houlihan 0–3, P O'Dwyer 0–2, K O'Dwyer 0–1, B O'Sullivan 0–1.		B Foley 0–8, J McDermott 1–1, P O'Reilly 0–3, E Foley 0–2, P O'Grady 0–1, T Sheehan 0–1.

=== Final ===
16 October 2005 Final	Garryspillane	2–15 – 2–12	Kilmallock	Gaelic Grounds
	Donie Ryan 1–3; F Carroll 0–6 (0–5 frees); P Tobin 1–0; David Ryan 0–3 (frees); J Ryan 0–2; E Burke 0–1.	Report	A O’Shaughnessy 1–4 (0–4 frees); M Houlihan 1–0; P O’Dwyer 0–3 (0–2 frees, 0–1 65); G O’Mahony 0–2; E Ryan 0–2; L Walshe 0–1.

== Championship statistics ==
=== Top scorers ===
Rank	Player	Club	Tally	Total	Matches	Average
1	Andrew O'Shaughnessy	Kilmallock	8–26	50	6	6.40
2	Alan O'Connor	Ballybrown	4–30	42	5	8.40
3	Barry Foley	Patrickswell	3–29	38	5	7.60
4	Frankie Carroll	Garryspillane	1–30	33	6	5.50
5	Patrick Kirby	Knockainey	3–23	32	6	5.33
6	Paul Neenan	Dromin/Athlacca	1–26	29	4	7.25
7	Michael Fitzgerald	Doon	2–22	28	3	9.33
8	John Meskell	Ahane	1–20	23	3	7.66
9	Kevin Tobin	Murroe/ Boher	1–19	22	4	5.50
10	Marcus Cregan	Croom	3–10	19	4	4.75
10	Peter Cregan	Croom	0–19	19	4	4.75
