= 2004 Limerick Senior Hurling Championship =

Annual hurling competition season

- Dates: 4 June – 10 October 2004
- Teams: 10
- Sponsor: Limerick's Live 95 FM
- Champions: Ahane (19th title); Cathal O'Reilly (captain); Eamon Meskall (manager)
- Runners-up: Garryspillane; David Ryan (captain); Tony Considine (manager)
- Relegated: Doon

Tournament statistics
- Matches played: 22
- Goals scored: 50 (2.27 per match)
- Points scored: 550 (25 per match)
- Top scorer(s): Conor Fitzgerald (0–33)

The 2004 Limerick Senior Hurling Championship was the 110th staging of the Limerick Senior Hurling Championship since its establishment by the Limerick County Board in 1887. The championship ran from 4 June to 10 October 2004.

Patrickswell entered the championship as the defending champions, however, they were beaten by Knockainey in the quarter-finals.

The final was played on 10 October 2004 at the Gaelic Grounds in Limerick, between Ahane and Garryspillane, in what was their first ever meeting in the final. Ahane won the match by 1–11 to 0–13 to claim their 19th championship title overall and a first title in five years. It remains their last championship title.

Adare's Conor Fitzgerald was the championship's top scorer with 0–33.

== Team changes ==
=== To Championship ===
Promoted from the Limerick Senior B Hurling Championship

- Murroe/Boher

=== From Championship ===
Relegated to the Limerick Senior B Hurling Championship

- Garryspillane

== Group 1 ==
=== Group 1 table ===
Quarter-finalists

Team	Matches				Score			Pts
Team	Pld	W	D	L	For	Against	Diff	Pts
Patrickswell	3	2	1	0	62	53	9	5
Ahane	3	2	0	1	52	44	8	4
Kilmallock	3	1	1	1	64	64	0	3
Murroe/Boher	3	0	0	3	54	71	−17	0

=== Group 1 results ===
4 June 2004 Round 1	Patrickswell	1–20 – 2–11	Murroe/Boher	Bruff Grounds
	P O'Grady 0–7, P O'Reilly 1–3, D O'Grady 0–3, J McDermott 0–3, B Geoghegan 0–1, B Murray 0–1, K Carey 0–1, B Foley 0–1.		E O'Neill 1–6, D Brouder 1–0, P Tobin 0–2, P McNamara 0–1, J Butler 0–1, W Walsh 0–1.

5 June 2004 Round 1	Kilmallock	2–07 – 1–16	Ahane	Fr Hayes Memorial Park
	E Ryan 1–0, M Cronin 1–0, A O'Shaughnessy 0–3, G O'Sullivan 0–2, B Carroll 0–1, P Tobin 0–1.		J Meskell 0–6, S O'Connor 0–4, B Healy 1–0, N Moran 0–2, A Doherty 0–2, D Laing 0–1, A Smith 0–1.

16 July 2004 Round 2	Kilmallock	2–18 – 3–15	Patrickswell	Bruff Grounds
	A O'Shaughnessy 1–3, C O'Dwyer 0–5, E Ryan 0–5, M Cronin 1–1, D O'Mahony 0–2, K O'Mahony 0–1, P Tobin 0–1.		P O'Grady 0–6, B Murray 1–2, B Geoghegan 1–2, B Mann 1–0, P O'Reilly 0–2, B Foley 0–2, E Foley 0–1.

16 July 2004 Round 2	Ahane	2–15 – 1–13	Murroe/Boher	Fr Hayes Memorial Park
	S O'Connor 1–3, J Meskell 0–4, B Healy 1–0, J Moran 0–3, N Moran 0–2, O Moran 0–1, J Doheny 0–1, A Smith 0–1.		E O'Neill 1–8, P McNamara 0–2, C Brouder 0–1, P Laffan 0–1, K Tobin 0–1.

14 August 2004 Round 3	Kilmallock	3–18 – 2–15	Murroe/Boher	Bruff Grounds
	A O'Shaughnessy 3–3, C O'Dwyer 0–7, L Walsh 0–3, D O'Mahony 0–1, G O'Mahony 0–1, G O'Sullivan 0–1, P Tobin 0–1, E Ryan 0–1.		E O'Neill 1–7, K Tobin 0–4, C Brouder 1–0, P Tobin 0–2, M Butler 0–1, J Butler 0–1.

14 August 2004 Round 3	Patrickswell	2–09 – 1–09	Ahane	Gaelic Grounds
	B Murray 1–2, B Foley 1–1, P O'Grady 0–3, D O'Grady 0–2, B Geoghegan 0–1.		J Meskell 1–5, O Moran 0–2, J Moran 0–1, D Laing 0–1.

== Group 2 ==
=== Group 2 table ===
Quarter-finalists Relegated

Team	Matches				Score			Pts
Team	Pld	W	D	L	For	Against	Diff	Pts
Adare	3	3	0	0	54	25	29	6
Croom	3	1	0	2	35	42	−7	2
Na Piarsaigh	3	1	0	2	42	50	−8	2
Doon	3	1	0	2	34	48	−14	2

=== Group 2 results ===
4 June 2004 Round 1	Na Piarsaigh	0–08 – 2–20	Adare	Mungret Grounds
	B Hartnett 0–3, C Sherlock 0–1, F McNamara 0–1, E Kelly 0–1, S O'Neill 0–1, D Ahern 0–1.		C Fitzgerald 0–10, M Noonan 2–1, D Sheehan 0–3, S Lavin 0–3, D Lavin 0–2, M Foley 0–1.

4 June 2004 Round 1	Croom	0–13 – 2–09	Doon	Gaelic Grounds
	P Cregan 0–5, T Carmody 0–2, H Flavin 0–2, S Moore 0–1, M Cregan 0–1, N Riordan 0–1, J Cahill 0–1.		M McKenna 1–5, J Ryan 1–0, D Stapelton 0–2, J Stokes 0–1, T Hayes 0–1.

16 July 2004 Round 2	Na Piarsaigh	3–12 – 1–06	Doon	Gaelic Grounds
	D Breen 3–1, B Hartnett 0–6, S O'Neill 0–2, R Marsh 0–1, A Ryan 0–1, C Minihan 0–1.		J Ryan 1–0, M McKenna 0–3, P Coleman 0–2, D Anderson 0–1.

3 August 2004 Round 2	Adare	0–14 – 0–07	Croom	FitzGerald Park
	C Fitzgerald 0–6, S Lavin 0–3, M Noonan 0–2, P Keane 0–1, T Houlihan 0–1, A O'Connell 0–1.		M Cregan 0–3, M O'Riordan 0–1, N O'Riordan 0–1, J Cahill 0–1, L Ryan 0–1.

14 August 2004 Round 3	Doon	0–10 – 0–14	Adare	FitzGerald Park
	M McKenna 0–5, D Anderson 0–2, T Hayes 0–1, D Ryan 0–1, R Ryan 0–1.		C Fitzgerald 0–8, S Lavin 0–2, M Noonan 0–1, J Foley 0–1, A O'Connell 0–1, S O'Connell 0–1.

14 August 2004 Round 3	Croom	0–15 – 1–10	Na Piarsaigh	Mungret Grounds
	M Cregan 0–6, J Cahill 0–3, S Moore 0–2, N O'Riordan 0–1, P Cregan 0–1, M O'Riordan 0–1, T Carmody 0–1.		B Hartnett 1–3, S O'Neill 0–3, D Breen 0–2, K Ryan 0–2.

=== Group 2 playoff ===
29 August 2004 Playoff	Na Piarsaigh	3–12 – 0–11	Croom	Mungret Grounds
	D Breen 1–4, S O'Neill 1–1, B Hartnett 0–3, C Sherlock 0–3, K Ryan 0–1.		M Cregan 0–7, J Cahill 0–2, P Cregan 0–2.

4 September 2004 Playoff	Croom	1–15 – 1–14	Doon	Fr Hayes Memorial Park
	M Cregan 0–8, L Ryan 1–1, N Riordan 0–3, J Cahill 0–2, N Lenihan 0–1.		M McKenna 0–9, P Coleman 1–1, T Hayes 0–2, D Stapleton 0–1, D Anderson 0–1.

== Knockout stage ==
=== Quarter-finals ===
4 September 2004 Quarter-final	Knockainey	4–10 – 1–12	Patrickswell	Bruff Grounds
	P Kirby 2–1, J Leo 1–2, D O'Brien 0–5, M Ryan 1–0, B O'Shea 0–1, E Mulcahy 0–1.		B Murray 0–6, E Foley 1–0, P O'Grady 0–3, B Geoghegan 0–2, B Mann 0–1.

5 September 2004 Quarter-final	Kilmallock	1–16 – 0–10	Na Piarsaigh	Gaelic Grounds
	A O'Shaughnessy 0–5, M Cronin 1–1, D O'Mahony 0–4, E Ryan 0–3, M Houlihan 0–2, B O'Sullivan 0–1.		S O'Neill 0–3, C Sherlock 0–3, D Breen 0–1, B Hartnett 0–1, K Bermingham 0–1, K Ryan 0–1.

5 September 2004 Quarter-final	Adare	1–12 – 1–12	Garryspillane	Gaelic Grounds
	C Fitzgerald 0–5, A O'Connell 1–0, B Foley 0–2, C Murphy 0–2, S Lavin 0–1, M Foley 0–1, D Sheehan 0–1.		Donie Ryan 1–3 F Carroll 0–4, David Ryan 0–2, C Hickey 0–1, TJ Ryan 0–1, M O'Brien 0–1.

12 September 2004 Quarter-final	Ahane	0–18 – 0–13	Croom	Gaelic Grounds
	N Moran 0–6, J Moran 0–3, O Moran 0–3, B Healy 0–3, J Meskell 0–1, D Laing 0–1, S O'Connor 0–1.		N O'Riordan 0–5, M Cregan 0–4, P Cahill 0–2, J Cahill 0–1, L Ryan 0–1.

12 September 2004 Quarter-final replay	Garryspillane	0–17 – 1–07	Adare	Gaelic Grounds
	Donie Ryan 0–5, M O'Donnell 0–4, TJ Ryan 0–2, M O'Brien 0–2, David Ryan 0–2, F Carroll 0–2.		M Foley 1–2, C Fitzgerald 0–4, D Sheehan 0–1.

=== Semi-finals ===
19 September 2004 Semi-final	Garryspillane	1–13 – 2–07	Kilmallock	Gaelic Grounds
	F Carroll 1–6, David Ryan 0–2, D O'Dea 0–1, E Burke 0–1, C Hickey 0–1, TJ Ryan 0–1, T O'Donnell 0–1.		M Houlihan 1–1, M Cronin 1–0, E Ryan 0–3, P Connery 0–1, A O'Shaughnessy 0–1, D O'Mahony 0–1.

19 September 2004 Semi-final	Ahane	1–12 – 0–05	Knockainey	Gaelic Grounds
	N Moran 0–6, J Meskell 1–0, P Ryan 0–2, A Doherty 0–1, O Moran 0–1, J Moran 0–1, B Healy 0–1.		D O'Brien 0–3, E Mulcahy 0–1, P McNamara 0–1.

=== Final ===
10 October 2004 Final	Ahane	1–11 – 0–13	Garryspillane	Gaelic Grounds
	N Moran 0–6 (0-5f), B Healy 1–1, J Meskell 0–2 (0-1f), D Laing, J Moran 0–1 each.		F Carroll 0–6 (all frees), Donie Ryan 0–3, TJ Ryan 0–2 (0-1f), David Ryan 0–2 (0–2 frees).	Referee: M Mann (Ballybrown)

== Championship statistics ==
=== Top scorers ===
Rank	Player	Club	Tally	Total	Matches	Average
1	Conor Fitzgerald	Adare	0–33	33	5	6.50
2	Eoin O'Neill	Murroe/Boher	3–21	30	3	10.00
3	Marcus Cregan	Croom	0–29	29	6	4.83#
4	Andrew O'Shaughnessy	Kilmallock	4–15	27	5	5.40
5	Mike McKenna	Doon	1–22	25	4	6.25
