= 1893 Limerick Senior Hurling Championship =

Annual hurling competition season

- Champions: Bruree (1st title)
- Runners-up: St. Michael's

The 1893 Limerick Senior Hurling Championship was the sixth staging of the Limerick Senior Hurling Championship since its establishment by the Limerick County Board in 1887.

Treaty Stones were the defending champions.

On 29 October 1893, Bruree won the championship after a 9–01 to 0–01 defeat of St. Michael's in the final. It was their first championship title.

== Results ==
=== Final ===
29 October 1893 Final	Bruree	9–01 to 0–01	St. Michael's	Croom Sportsfield, Croom

== Championship statistics ==
=== Miscellaneous ===
- Bruree win their first title and wouldn't do so again until 2006.
