= Conor Fitzgerald =

Conor Fitzgerald may refer to:

- Conor Fitzgerald (hurler)
- Conor Fitzgerald (rugby union)
