= T. J. Ryan (hurler) =

Irish hurler and selector

T.J. Ryan
Personal information
- Native name: T. S. Ó Riain (Irish)
- Born: 9 May 1974 (age 52) Knocklong, County Limerick, Ireland
- Occupation: Sales director
- Height: 1.78 m (5 ft 10 in)

Sport
- Sport: Hurling
- Position: Left Corner Forward
Club
- Years: Club
- 1991–2009: Garryspillane
Club titles
- Limerick titles: 1
College
- Years: College
- University College Galway
College titles
- Fitzgibbon titles: 0
Inter-county
Years	County	Apps (scores)
1994–2006	Limerick	40 (5-59)
Inter-county titles
- Munster titles: 2
- All-Irelands: 0
- NHL: 1
- All Stars: 0

T. J. Ryan (born 12 November 1974) is an Irish hurling manager, selector and former player. At club level, he played with Garryspillane and at inter-county level with the Limerick senior hurling team.

== Early life ==
Born and raised in Knocklong, County Limerick, Ryan attended the local national school. He later attended the Presentation De La Salle Secondary School in Hospital and played hurling in all grades during his time there, including in the Dr Harty Cup. Ryan later studied agricultural science at University College Galway and played on the university's Fitzgibbon Cup team, however, he left after two years without taking his degree.

== Club career ==
Ryan began his club career at juvenile and underage levels with the Garryspillane club. He won a Limerick U21BHC medal in 1995, when he and his brother Donie Ryan scored 2–09 in the 5–13 to 0–07 win over Monaleen in the final.

By that stage, Ryan had already lined out at adult level. He was in goal when Garryspillane beat Ardagh by 4–12 to 2–07 in a replay to win the Limerick IHC title in 1990. Ryan claimed a second Limerick IHC medal after a 1–10 to 0–11 win over Mungret/St Paul's in 1996.

After winning the Limerick SBHC title after an extra-time defeat of Knockainey in 2004, Ryan was at wing-forward when Garryspillane won their first ever Limerick SHC in 2005, after a 2–15 to 2–12 win over Kilmallock in the final. He played his last senior club game in September 2009 in a 1-15 to 1-09 relegation play-off defeat of Tournafulla.

== Inter-county career ==
Ryan first played for Limerick during a two-year stint with the minor team. He was wing-forward when the team was beaten by Tipperary in the 1991 Munster MHC final. Ryan later spent three consecutive years with the under-21 team, but ended his underage career without silverware.

Ryan was just 18-years-old when he made his senior team debut in a National Hurling League game against Cork in October 1993. He made his Munster SHC debut against the same opposition in June 1994. Ryan won his first Munster SHC later that year, following a 0–25 to 2–10 win over Clare. He lined out at corner-forward in Limerick's 3–16 to 2–13 defeat by Offaly in the 1994 All-Ireland SHC final.

Two years later, Ryan won a second Munster SHC medal after beating Tipperary by 4–07 to 0–16 in a replay. Limerick later qualified for the 1996 All-Ireland SHC final, with Ryan once again lining out at corner-forward, however, Wexford won the game by 1–13 to 0–14. He added a National League medal to his collection in 1997.

Ryan continued to line out with Limerick for much of the following decade. He served as team captain in 2004 and 2006. Ryan announced his retirement from inter-county hurling in July 2006.

== Inter-provincial career ==
Ryan's performances at inter-county level resulted in him being selected for the Munster inter-provincial team. He won his first Railway Cup medal as a non-playing substitute in 2000, before claiming a second successive title in 2001, after lining out at corner-back in the 1-21 to 1-15 win over Connacht in the final.

== Management career ==
Ryan was an unsuccessful candidate for the Limerick senior team's manager post in September 2010, however, he became a selector, alongside former teammates Ciarán Carey and Pat Heffernan, under Dónal O'Grady. The new management sought to restore order to the team, following on from a year in which the players went on strike and refused to play. Limerick went on to win the National Hurling League Division 2 title in 2011, following a 4–12 to 2–13 defeat of Clare in the final.

The Limerick management team broke up after one year and Ryan moved to the club scene as manager of Kilworth. He guided the team to the Cork IHC title in October 2012, after a 2-15 to 2-13 win over Kanturk.

Ryan was appointed manager of the Limerick under-21 team in November 2012 and spent one season in charge. In November 2013, Ryan was named as the joint-manager of the Limerick senior hurling team, alongside former boss Dónal O'Grady. He took over as manager in his own right in April 2014, when O'Grady stepped away when the Limerick County Board falsely claimed at a meeting that the co-managers had "apologised for the abysmal" displays of the team during the National League. Ryan stepped down as manager in July 2016.

Ryan returned to club management with Garryspillane. He guided the team to the Limerick PIHC title in October 2018, after a 2–12 to 0–12 win over Bruff in the final. Ryan later served as trainer of the St Thomas' team that won three consecutive Galway SHC titles between 2018 and 2020.

== Honours ==
=== Player ===
Garryspillane

- Limerick Senior Hurling Championship (1): 2005
- Limerick Senior B Hurling Championship (1): 2004
- Limerick Intermediate Hurling Championship (2): 1990, 1996
- Limerick Under-21 Hurling Championship (1): 1995
- Limerick Under-12 Hurling Championship (1): 1986

Limerick

- Munster Senior Hurling Championship (2): 1994, 1996
- National Hurling League (1): 1997

Munster

- Railway Cup (2): 2000, 2001

=== Management ===
Kilworth

- Cork Intermediate Hurling Championship (1): 2012

Garryspillane

- Limerick Premier Intermediate Hurling Championship (1): 2018

St Thomas'

- Galway Senior Hurling Championship (3): 2018, 2019, 2020

Limerick

- National Hurling League Division 2 (1): 2011

Sporting positions
Preceded by Ciarán Carey	Limerick senior hurling team captain 2004	Succeeded by Ollie Moran
Preceded by Ollie Moran	Limerick senior hurling team captain 2006	Succeeded by Damian Reale
Preceded by John Fitzgerald	Limerick under-21 hurling team manager 2012-2013	Succeeded by Ciarán Carey
Preceded by John Allen	Limerick senior hurling team manager (jointly with Dónal O'Grady (2013-2014)); 2013-2016	Succeeded by John Kiely
