= Turlough Herbert =

Irish hurler

Personal information
- Native name: Toirealach Hoireabard (Irish)
- Born: 1968 (age 57–58) Castleconnell, County Limerick, Ireland
- Occupation: Solicitor

Sport
- Sport: Hurling
- Position: Left wing-forward
Club
- Years: Club
- 1980s-2000s: Ahane
Inter-county
- Years: County
- 1993-1996: Limerick
Inter-county titles
- Munster titles: 0
- All-Irelands: 0
- NHL: 0
- All Stars: 0

Turlough Herbert (born 1968 in Castleconnell, County Limerick, Ireland) is an Irish retired sportsperson. He played hurling with his local club Ahane and was a member of the Limerick senior inter-county team from 1993 until 1996.
