= Donncha Sheehan =

Irish hurler

Personal information
- Native name: Donncha Ó Síocháin (Irish)
- Born: 24 August 1979 (age 47) Adare, County Limerick, Ireland
- Occupation: Biochemist
- Height: 5 ft 7 in (170 cm)

Sport
- Sport: Hurling
- Position: Left corner-forward
Club
- Years: Club
- Adare
Club titles
- Limerick titles: 5
College(s)
- Years: College
- University College Cork; University of Limerick
College titles
- Fitzgibbon titles: 1
Inter-county
Years	County	Apps (scores)
2003-2009	Limerick	15 (1-11)
Inter-county titles
- Munster titles: 0
- All-Irelands: 0
- NHL: 0
- All Stars: 0

Donncha Sheehan (born 24 August 1979) is an Irish former hurler. At club level, he played with Adare and at inter-county level with the Limerick senior hurling team.

== Career ==
Sheehan played hurling at all grades as a student at Ardscoil Rís in Limerick. He later studied at University of Limerick and was part of the UL team that beat Waterford Institute of Technology by 2-14 to 2-11 to claim the Fitzgibbon Cup title in 2002.

At club level, Sheehan first played for Adare at juvenile and underage levels, and was part of the club's under-21 team that won consecutive Limerick U21AHC titles in 1999 and 2000. He progressed to the club's senior side and was involved in five Limerick SHC-winning teams. Sheehan captained Adare to three successive title wins between 2007 and 2009.

At inter-county level, Sheehan first played for Limerick as part of the under-21 team. He won a Munster U21HC medal before later captaining the team to a 1-13 to 0-13 win over Galway in the 2000 All-Ireland under-21 final. Sheehan made his senior team debut in 2003. He was an unused substitute when Limerick had a 2-17 to 1-15 defeat by Kilkenny in the 2007 All-Ireland final.

== Honours ==
University of Limerick

- Fitzgibbon Cup: 2002

Adare

- Limerick Senior Hurling Championship: 2001, 2002, 2007 (c), 2008 (c), 2009 (c)
- Limerick Intermediate Football Championship: 2000
- Limerick Under-21 Hurling Championship: 1999, 2000

Limerick

- All-Ireland Under-21 Hurling Championship: 2000
- Munster Under-21 Hurling Championship: 2000

Sporting positions
Preceded by	Limerick under-21 hurling team captain 2000	Succeeded by Timmy Houlihan
Achievements
Preceded by Ger Fennelly	All-Ireland Under-21 Hurling Final winning captain 2000	Succeeded by Timmy Houlihan
