= Limerick Senior Hurling Championship =

Annual hurling competition

- Current season or competition: 2026 Limerick Senior Hurling Championship
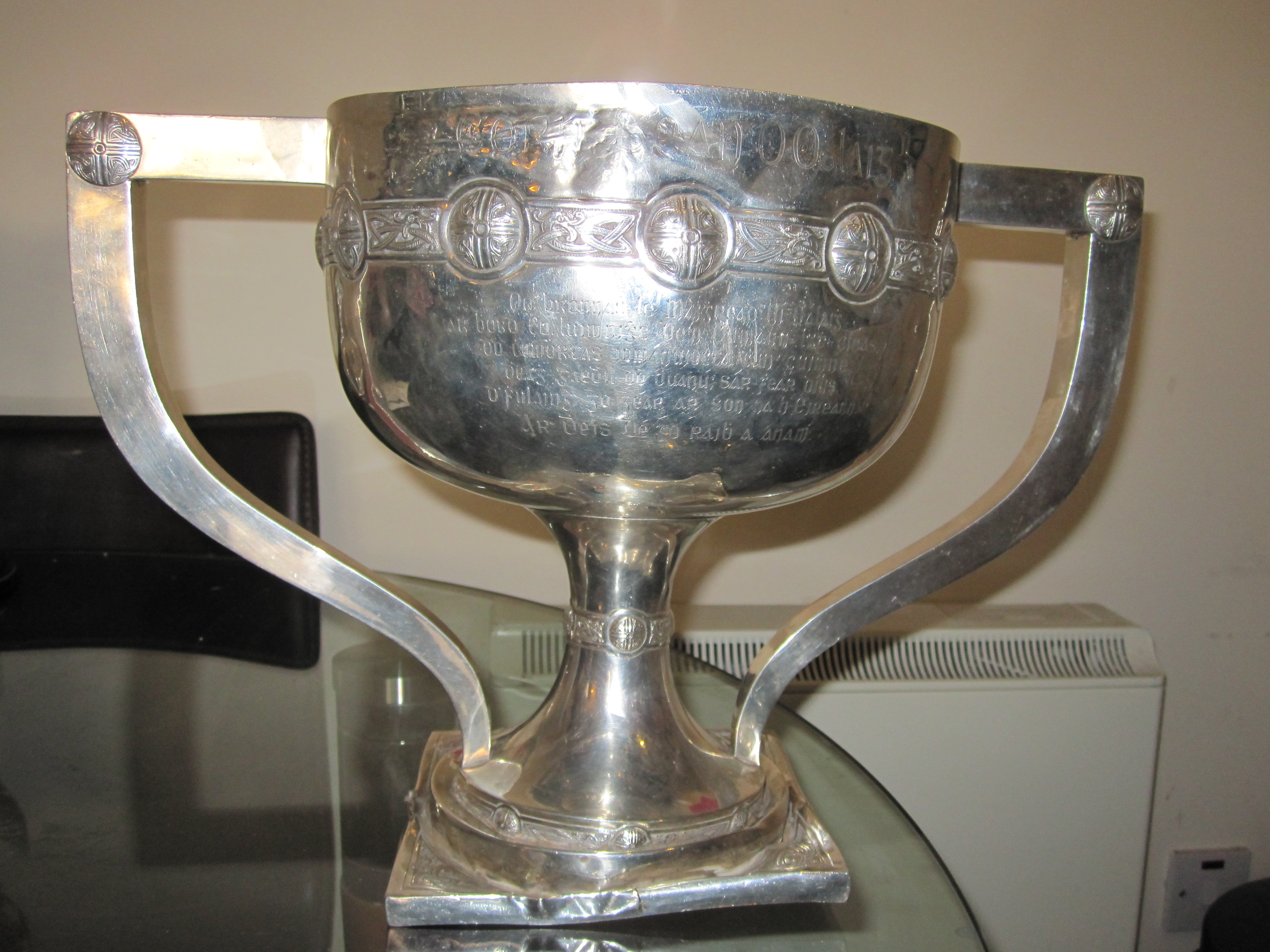
- John Daly Cup
- Irish: Craobh Iomána Sinsear Contae Luimní
- Code: Hurling
- Founded: 1887; 139 years ago
- Region: Limerick (GAA)
- Trophy: John Daly Cup
- No. of teams: 12
- Title holders: Kilmallock (13th title)
- Most titles: Patrickswell (20 titles)
- Sponsors: Whitebox Developments
- TV partner(s): RTÉ, TG4
- Official website: Limerick GAA

The Limerick Senior Hurling Championship (known for sponsorship reasons as the Bon Secours Hospital County Senior Hurling Championship and abbreviated to the Limerick SHC) is an annual hurling competition organised by the Limerick County Board of the Gaelic Athletic Association and contested by the top-ranking senior clubs in the county of Limerick in Ireland. It is the most prestigious competition in Limerick hurling.

The series of games are played during the summer and autumn months with the county final currently being played at the Gaelic Grounds in October. The prize for the winning team is the John Daly Cup. Initially played as a knock-out competition, the championship currently uses a round robin format followed by a knock-out stage.

The Limerick County Championship is an integral part of the wider Munster Senior Club Hurling Championship. The winners of the Limerick county final join the champions of the other four hurling counties to contest the provincial championship.

Twelve teams currently participate in the Limerick County Championship. The title has been won at least once by 29 different teams. The all-time record-holders are Patrickswell, who have won a total of 20 titles.

The current holders are Kilmallock after beating Na Piarsaigh in the 2026 final.

== Format ==
=== Overview ===
The Limerick County Championship features a group stage followed by a knock-out stage. Each team in the championship is guaranteed at least five games. Relegation also takes place with the Limerick Premier Intermediate Hurling Championship.

=== Group stage ===
For the group stage there are two groups of six teams. In 2018 the teams have been ranked based on their recent performances. Group 1 consists of what are regarded as the "strongest" teams. All six of these teams qualified for the knock-out stage in 2017. Group 2 is the "weaker" teams.

Teams play the other five teams in the group once, and match points are awarded depending on the result of each game, with teams receiving two points for a win, and one for a draw.

Following the completion of the group stage, the top four-ranking teams in Group 1 and the top two-ranking teams in Group 2 qualify for the knock-out stage of the championship.

=== Knockout stage ===
The two quarter-finals consist of the third and fourth-ranked teams from Group 1 and the top two-ranked teams from Group 2. The winners of the quarter-finals advance to the semi-finals where they join the top two-ranked teams from Group 1 who received a bye to this stage.

== Teams ==
=== 2026 teams ===
The 12 teams competing in the 2026 Limerick Senior Hurling Championship were:

Team	Location	Division	Colours	Position in 2026	In championship since	Championship titles	Last championship title
Adare	Adare	West	Red and black	Quarter-finals	?	5	2009
Ahane	Castleconnell	East	Green and gold	Relegated to group 2	?	19	2004
Ballybrown	Clarina	City	White and green	Group 1	2013	2	1991
Doon	Doon	East	Red and white	Semi-finals	?	1	2024
Garryspillane	Knocklong	South	Black and amber	Group 2	2026	1	2005
Kildimo-Pallaskenry	Pallaskenry	City	Blue and white	Relegated to PIHC	2021	0	—
Kilmallock	Kilmallock	South	Green and white	Champion	?	13	2026
Monaleen	Castletroy	City	Red and white	Semi-finals	2023	0	—
Mungret/St. Paul's	Mungret	City	Red and white	Quarter-finals	2022	0	—
Na Piarsaigh	Caherdavin	City	Blue and white	Runners-up	1995	8	2023
Newcastle West	Newcastle West	West	Black and white	Group 2	2025	2	1925
Patrickswell	Patrickswell	City	Blue and gold	Group 2	?	20	2019

== Sponsorship ==
Between 2016 and 2018 the Limerick County Championship was sponsored by the Credit Union. The championship was previously sponsored by the Limerick Motor Centre. Between 2019 and 2024 the Bon Secours Hospital were the primary sponsors. Property development company Whitebox Developments agreed to a three-year sponsorship deal in July 2025.

== Qualification for subsequent competitions ==
The Limerick Senior Hurling Championship winners qualify for the subsequent Munster Senior Club Hurling Championship. This place is reserved for club teams only as divisional and amalgamated teams are not allowed in the provincial championship.

== Venues ==
=== Group stage ===
Fixtures in the group stage of the championship are usually played at a neutral venue that is deemed halfway between the participating teams. Some of the more common venues include Fr. Hayes Memorial Park and FitzGerald Park, while the Gaelic Grounds also hosts a number of double-headers. Quarter-finals and semi-finals are also held at the Gaelic Grounds.

=== Final ===
The final has been played at the Gaelic Grounds since it opened in the late 1920s. Prior to this the Markets Field regularly hosted the county final.

== Trophy ==
The winning team is presented with the John Daly Cup. A native of Limerick, John Daly (1845-1916) was a leading member of the Irish Republican Brotherhood. In 1928, Madge Daly who was a niece of John Daly, presented the Limerick County Board with a cup for the county senior hurling championship. The first captain to accept the cup was Bob McConkey.

== Managers ==
Managers in the Limerick Championship are involved in the day-to-day running of the team, including the training, team selection, and sourcing of players. Their influence varies from club-to-club and is related to the individual club committees. The manager is assisted by a team of two or three selectors and a backroom team consisting of various coaches.

Winning managers (1982–present)
Manager	Team	Wins	Winning years
Phil Bennis	Patrickswell	9	1982, 1983, 1984, 1987, 1988, 1990, 1995, 1996, 1997
Ger O'Loughlin	Adare; Kilmallock	4	2007, 2008, 2009, 2014
Tony Considine	Garryspillane; Kilmallock	4	2005, 2010, 2012, 2021
Shane O'Neill	Na Piarsaigh	4	2015, 2017, 2023, 2025
P. J. O'Grady	Patrickswell	1	1993, 2000
Éamonn Meskell	Ahane	2	1998, 1999
Dave Keane	Adare	2	2001, 2002
Seán Stack	Na Piarsaigh	2	2011, 2013
Kieran Bermingham	Na Piarsaigh	2	2020, 2022
Willie O'Brien	Kilmallock	1	1985
Tom Ryan	Ballybrown	1	1989
John Loftus	Ballybrown	1	1992
Tony Moloney	Kilmallock	1	1992
Neil Ronan	Kilmallock	1	1994
Jim Fawl	Patrickswell	1	2003
Eamon Meskell	Ahane	1	2004
John Tuohy	Bruree	1	2006
Gary Kirby	Patrickswell	1	2016
Paul Beary	Na Piarsaigh	1	2018
Ciaran Carey	Patrickswell	1	2019
Derek McGrath	Doon	1	2024

== List of finals ==
=== Legend ===
- Gold – Munster senior club champions
- Silver – Munster senior club runners-up

=== List of Limerick SHC finals ===
Year	Winners		Runners-up	
Year	Club	Score	Club	Score
2026	Kilmallock	3-19	Na Piarsaigh	1-22
2025	Na Piarsaigh	2-25	Doon	2-18 (aet)
2024	Doon	0-16	Na Piarsaigh	2-09
2023	Na Piarsaigh	1-20	Patrickswell	0-19
2022	Na Piarsaigh	3-23	Kilmallock	2-15
2021	Kilmallock	1-24	Patrickswell	0-19
2020	Na Piarsaigh	5-27	Doon	1-12
2019	Patrickswell	1-17	Na Piarsaigh	0-15
2018	Na Piarsaigh	2-22	Doon	3-10
2017	Na Piarsaigh	1-22	Kilmallock	2-14
2016	Patrickswell	1-26	Ballybrown	1-07
2015	Na Piarsaigh	1-22	Patrickswell	4-12
2014	Kilmallock	1-15	Na Piarsaigh	0-14
2013	Na Piarsaigh	0-14	Adare	0-12
2012	Kilmallock	1-15	Adare	0-15
2011	Na Piarsaigh	2-18	Ahane	0-13
2010	Kilmallock	1-16	Emmets	1-12
2009	Adare	1-17	Na Piarsaigh	0-03
2008	Adare	0-13	Ahane	0-08
2007	Adare	0-14	Croom	0-05
2006	Bruree	1-16	Patrickswell	1-15
2005	Garryspillane	2-15	Kilmallock	2-12
2004	Ahane	1-11	Garryspillane	0-13
2003	Patrickswell	1-13	Adare	0-14
2002	Adare	0-14	Ahane	0-12
2001	Adare	2-17	Patrickswell	2-08
2000	Patrickswell	0-16	Doon	0-15
1999	Ahane	0-14	Kilmallock	2-05
1998	Ahane	1-11	Patrickswell	0-09
1997	Patrickswell	1-12	Garryspillane	0-09
1996	Patrickswell	1-12	Adare	0-06
1995	Patrickswell	2-19	Ballybrown	0-08
1994	Kilmallock	2-09, 1-12	Bruree	1-08, 1-12
1993	Patrickswell	0-17	Adare	0-07
1992	Kilmallock	1-12	Patrickswell	0-12
1991	Ballybrown	1-11	Kilmallock	1-10
1990	Patrickswell	1-15	Adare	1-12
1989	Ballybrown	4-10	Doon	2-09
1988	Patrickswell	4-10	Cappamore	2-06
1987	Patrickswell	1-17	Ballybrown	3-10
1986	Claughaun	1-09	Adare	0-09
1985	Kilmallock	3-12	South Liberties	1-13
1984	Patrickswell	4-13	Cappamore	3-05
1983	Patrickswell	1-13	Ballybrown	1-07
1982	Patrickswell	0-17	Bruree	0-15
1981	South Liberties	4-07	Kilmallock	2-11
1980	Killeedy	2-07	South Liberties	1-07
1979	Patrickswell	2-16	Tournafulla	0-16
1978	South Liberties	2-09	Bruree	2-05
1977	Patrickswell	3-07	Killeedy	0-07
1976	South Liberties	2-09	Killeedy	2-06
1975	Kilmallock	3-14	Patrickswell	3-07
1974	Kilmallock	2-09	Patrickswell	3-05
1973	Kilmallock	2-12	Killeedy	2-04
1972	South Liberties	4-08	Patrickswell	1-05
1971	Claughaun	6-06	South Liberties	2-13
1970	Patrickswell	2-14	Kilmallock	0-02
1969	Patrickswell	0-17	Pallasgreen	2-02
1968	Claughaun	2-09	Adare	2-05
1967	Kilmallock	4-07	South Liberties	2-07
1966	Patrickswell	5-11	St. Patrick's	3-07
1965	Patrickswell		St. Kieran's	
1964	Cappamore	5-05	Drumcollogher	1-04
1963	Feenagh–Kilmeedy	3-06	Emmets	3-01
1962	Western Gaels	4-05	Kilmallock	4-03
1961	Western Gaels	7-04	Treaty Sarsfields	0-09
1960	Kilmallock	4-05	Claughaun	0-04
1959	Cappamore	2-08	St. Patrick's	0-04
1958	Claughaun	2-09	Cappamore	1-04
1957	Claughaun	7-07	St. Patrick's	3-02
1956	Cappamore	5-04	Claughaun	2-07
1955	Ahane	2-05	Geraldines	0-05
1954	Cappamore	2-11	Western Gaels	3-05
1953	Treaty Sarsfields	2-05	Ahane	0-05
1952	Treaty Sarsfields	6-10	St. Patrick's	1-02
1951	Treaty Sarsfields	1-06	Geraldines	1-02
1950	St. Patrick's	4-05	City Gaels	3-05
1949	St. Patrick's	1-07	Geraldines	1-03
1948	Ahane	2-03	Croom	0-01
1947	Ahane	5-06	St. Patrick's	1-05
1946	Ahane	6-07	Rathkeale	1-01
1945	Ahane	5-09	Granagh-Ballingarry	3-02
1944	Ahane	4-02	Rathkeale	1-08
1943	Ahane	7-07	Croom	1-02
1942	Ahane	7-08	Rathkeale	1-00
1941	Croom	4-02	Ahane	4-01
1940	Croom	4-02	Ahane	3-01
1939	Ahane	5-08	Croom	2-04
1938	Ahane	4-05	Croom	2-02
1937	Ahane	9-05	Croom	1-02
1936	Ahane	7-08	Croom	0-03
1935	Ahane	6-08	Kildimo	2-03
1934	Ahane	6-06	Kildimo	3-03
1933	Ahane	1-07	Croom	1-01
1932	Young Irelands	2-06	Newcastle West	1-03
1931	Ahane	5-05	Croom	1-04
1930	Young Irelands	4-02	Newcastle West	1-04
1929	Croom	7-04	Cappamore	2-02
1928	Young Irelands	5-07	Rathkeale	2-01
1927	Fedamore	5-01	Young Irelands	1-03
1926	Claughaun	5-03	Newcastle West	1-04
1925	Newcastle West	3-02	Bruff	1-02
1924	Croom	6-03	Fedamore	2-01
1923	Championship not held			
1922	Young Irelands	10-06	Bruff	2-02
1921	Championship not held			
1920	Young Irelands	5-04	Newcastle West	0-01
1919	Croom	1-01	Fedamore	1-00
1918	Claughaun	W/O	Newcastle West	
1917	Newcastle West	3-04	Young Irelands	3-01
1916	Claughaun	8-03	Caherline	3-01
1915	Claughaun	W/O	Fedamore	
1914	Claughaun	6-00	Castleconnell	1-00
1913	Championship not held			
1912	Fedamore	4-04	Ballingarry	2-02
1911	Ballingarry	4-02	Fedamore	1-02
1910	Young Irelands	4-02	Castleconnell	4-01
1909	Castleconnell	9-12	Croom	3-10
1908	Croom	2-06	Caherline	0-04
1907	Caherline	3-08	Ballyagran	0-01
1906	Championship not held			
1905	Caherline	3-05	Rathkeale	2-02
1904	Cappamore	3-07	Ballingarry	1-05
1903	Championship not held			
1902	Young Irelands	2-09	Monagea	0-05
1901	Championship not held			
1900	Sallymount	7-01	Rathkeale	2-04
1899	Kilfinane	2-09	Lough Gur	0-00
1898	Shamrocks	1-06	Caherline	1-02
1897	Kilfinane	4-09	Cappamore	4-08
1896	Caherline	2-06	Ballingarry	2-01
1895	St Michael's	2-03	Boher	0-01
1894	Championship not held			
1893	Bruree	9-01	St. Michael's	0-01
1892	Championship not held			
1891	Treaty Stones	2-01	South Liberties	0-01
1890	South Liberties	0-01	Kilfinane	0-00
1889	South Liberties	1-02	Caherline	0-03
1888	South Liberties	0-01	Murroe	0-00
1887	Murroe	1-00 (R)	South Liberties	0-01 (R)

No championship was held in the following years: 1892, 1894, 1901, 1903, 1906, 1913, 1921, 1923.

== Roll of honour ==
=== By club ===
#	Club	Titles	Runners-up	Championships won	Championships runner-up
1	Patrickswell	20	10	1965, 1966, 1969, 1970, 1977, 1979, 1982, 1983, 1984, 1987, 1988, 1990, 1993, 1995, 1996, 1997, 2000, 2003, 2016, 2019	1972, 1974, 1975, 1992, 1998, 2001, 2006, 2015, 2021, 2023
2	Ahane	19	6	1931, 1933, 1934, 1935, 1936, 1937, 1938, 1939, 1942, 1943, 1944, 1945, 1946, 1947, 1948, 1955, 1998, 1999, 2004	1940, 1941, 1953, 2002, 2008, 2011
3	Kilmallock	13	8	1960, 1967, 1973, 1974, 1975, 1985, 1992, 1994, 2010, 2012, 2014, 2021, 2026	1962, 1970, 1981, 1991, 1999, 2005, 2017, 2022
4	Claughaun	10	2	1914, 1915, 1916, 1918, 1926, 1957, 1958, 1968, 1971, 1986	1956, 1960
5	Na Piarsaigh	9	5	2011, 2013, 2015, 2017, 2018, 2020, 2022, 2023, 2025	2009, 2014, 2019, 2024, 2026
6	South Liberties	7	6	1888, 1889, 1890, 1972, 1976, 1978, 1981	1887, 1891, 1967, 1971, 1980, 1985
6	Young Irelands	7	2	1902, 1910, 1920, 1922, 1928, 1930, 1932	1917, 1927
8	Croom	6	10	1908, 1919, 1924, 1929, 1940, 1941	1909, 1931, 1933, 1936, 1937, 1938, 1939, 1943, 1948, 2007
8	Adare	5	8	2001, 2002, 2007, 2008, 2009	1968, 1986, 1990, 1993, 1996, 2003, 2012, 2013
8	Cappamore	5	5	1904, 1954, 1956, 1959, 1964	1897, 1929, 1958, 1984, 1988
11	Caherline	3	4	1896, 1905, 1907	1889, 1898, 1908, 1916
11	Treaty Sarsfields	3	1	1951, 1952, 1953	1961
13	Ballybrown	2	4	1989, 1991	1983, 1987, 1995, 2016
13	St Patrick's	2	5	1949, 1950	1947, 1952, 1957, 1959, 1966
13	Newcastle West	2	5	1917, 1925	1918, 1920, 1926, 1930, 1932
13	Fedamore	2	4	1912, 1927	1911, 1915, 1919, 1924
13	Bruree	2	3	1893, 2006	1978, 1982, 1994
13	Kilfinnane	2	1	1897, 1899	1890
13	Western Gaels	2	1	1961, 1962	1954
20	Doon	1	5	2024	1989, 2000, 2018, 2020, 2025
20	Killeedy	1	3	1980	1973, 1976, 1977
20	Ballingarry	1	3	1911	1896, 1904, 1912
20	Castleconnell	1	2	1950	1910, 1914
20	Garryspillane	1	2	2005	1997, 2004
20	Murroe / Boher	1	1	1897	1888
20	St Michael's	1	1	1895	1893
20	Treaty Stones	1	0	1891	—
20	Sallymount	1	0	1900	—
20	Shamrocks	1	0	1898	—
20	Feenagh–Kilmeedy	1	0	1963	—
30	Rathkeale	0	6	—	1900, 1905, 1928, 1942, 1944, 1946
30	Geraldines	0	3	—	1949, 1951, 1955
30	Bruff	0	2	—	1922, 1925
30	Kildimo	0	2	—	1934, 1935
30	Emmets	0	2	—	1963, 2010
30	Boher	0	1	—	1895
30	Lough Gur	0	1	—	1899
30	Monagea	0	1	—	1902
30	Ballyagran	0	1	—	1907
30	Granagh-Ballingarry	0	1	—	1945
30	City Gaels	0	1	—	1950
30	Dromcollogher	0	1	—	1964
30	St Kierans	0	1	—	1965
30	Pallasgreen	0	1	—	1969
30	Tournafulla	0	1	—	1979

=== By division ===
Club	Titles	Runners-up	Most recent title
City	52	30	2023
East	40	37	2024
South	23	29	2021
West	11	29	2009
Killeedy	1	3	
St Michael's	1	1	
Treaty Stones	1	0	
Shamrocks	1	0	
St Kierans	0	1	

=== Roll of honour summary ===
#	Club	Wins	Last win	Runner-up	Last losing final
1	Patrickswell	20	2019	10	2023
2	Ahane	19	2004	6	2011
3	Kilmallock	12	2021	8	2022
4	Claughaun	10	1986	2	1986
5	Na Piarsaigh	9	2025	4	2024
6	South Liberties	7	1981	6	1985
6	Young Irelands	7	1932	2	1927
8	Croom	6	1941	10	2007
8	Adare	5	2009	8	2013
8	Cappamore	5	1964	5	1988
11	Caherline	3	1907	4	1916
11	Treaty Sarsfields	3	1951	1	1961
13	Newcastlewest	2	1925	5	1932
13	St. Patrick's	2	1950	5	1966
13	Fedamore	2	1927	4	1924
13	Ballybrown	2	1991	4	2016
13	Bruree	2	2006	3	1994
13	Western Gaels	2	1962	1	1954
13	Kilfinnane	2	1899	1	1890
20	Doon	1	2024	5	2025
20	Ballingarry	1	1911	3	1912
20	Killeedy	1	1980	3	1977
20	Castleconnell	1	1909	2	1914
20	Garryspillane	1	2005	2	2004
20	Murroe	1	1887	1	1888
20	St Michaels	1	1895	1	1893
20	Treaty Stones	1	1891	0	—
20	Shamrocks	1	1898	0	—
20	Sallymount	1	1900	0	—
20	Feenagh–Kilmeedy	1	1963	0	—
30	Rathkeale	0	—	6	1946
30	Geraldines	0	—	3	1955
30	Bruff	0	—	2	1925
30	Kildimo	0	—	2	1935
30	Emmets	0	—	2	2010
30	Boher	0	—	1	1895
30	Lough Gur	0	—	1	1899
30	Monagea	0	—	1	1902
30	Ballyagran	0	—	1	1907
30	Granagh-Ballingarry	0	—	1	1945
30	City Gaels	0	—	1	1950
30	Dromcollogher	0	—	1	1964
30	Saint Kieran's	0	—	1	1965
30	Pallasgreen	0	—	1	1969
30	Tournafulla	0	—	1	1979

== Records and statistics ==
=== Team ===
==== By decade ====
The most successful team of each decade, judged by number of Limerick Senior Hurling Championship titles, is as follows:

- 1880s: 2 for South Liberties (1888-89)
- 1890s: 2 for Kilfinane (1897-99)
- 1900s: 2 for Caherline (1905-07)
- 1910s: 4 for Claughaun (1914-15-16-18)
- 1920s: 3 for Young Irelands (1920-22-28)
- 1930s: 8 for Ahane (1931-33-34-35-36-37-38-39)
- 1940s: 7 for Ahane (1942-43-44-45-46-47-48)
- 1950s: 3 each for Treaty Sarsfields (1951-52-53) and Cappamore (1954-56-59)
- 1960s: 3 for Patrickswell (1965-66-69)
- 1970s: 3 each for Patrickswell (1970-77-79), South Liberties (1972-76-78) and Kilmallock (1973-74-75)
- 1980s: 5 for Patrickswell (1982-83-84-87-88)
- 1990s: 5 for Patrickswell (1990-93-95-96-97)
- 2000s: 5 for Adare (2001-02-07-08-09)
- 2010s: 5 for Na Piarsaigh (2011-13-15-17-18)
- 2020s: 3 for Na Piarsaigh (2020-22-23)

==== Gaps ====
Top ten longest gaps between successive championship titles:

- 113 years: Bruree (1893-2006)
- 82 years: South Liberties (1890-1972)
- 50 years: Cappamore (1904-1954)
- 43 years: Ahane (1955-1998)
- 31 years: Claughaun (1926-1957)
- 16 years: Kilmallock (1994-2010)
- 15 years: Claughaun (1971-1986)
- 13 years: Patrickswell (2003-2016)
- 11 years: Croom (1908-1919)
- 11 years: Croom (1929-1940)

=== Top scorers ===
==== Finals ====
Final	Top scorer	Team	Score	Total
1979	Richie Bennis	Patrickswell	0-07	7
1980	Éamonn Grimes	South Liberties	0-06	6
1981	Paddy Kelly	Kilmallock	1-05	8
1981	Paddy Kelly	Kilmallock	1-08	11
1982	Richie Bennis	Patrickswell	0-05	5
1983	Séamus Kirby	Patrickswell	1-05	8
1984	Liam O'Brien	Cappamore	1-05	8
1985	Johnny Neenan	Kilmallock	2-04	10
1986	Leo O'Connor	Claughaun	0-04	4
1987	Christy Keyes	Ballybrown	1-06	9
1988	Liam O'Brien (D)	Cappamore	2-04	10
1988	Gary Kirby (R)	Patrickswell	1-02	5
1988	Ciarán Carey (R)	Patrickswell	1-02	5
1989	Richard Walsh	Doon	2-05	11
1990	Gary Kirby	Patrickswell	0-09	9
1991	Pat Davoren	Ballybrown	0-07	7
1992	Gary Kirby	Patrickswell	0-06	6
1992	Paddy Kelly	Kilmallock	0-06	6
1993	Gary Kirby	Patrickswell	0-08	8
1994	Séamus O'Connell (D)	Bruree	0-07	7
1994	Séamus O'Connell (R)	Bruree	1-05	8
1995	Gary Kirby	Patrickswell	0-12	12
1996	Gary Kirby (D)	Patrickswell	3-08	17
1996	Gary Kirby (R)	Patrickswell	1-06	9
1997	Gary Kirby	Patrickswell	1-08	11
1998	Gary Kirby	Patrickswell	0-06	6
1998	Turlough Herbert	Ahane	0-06	6
1999	Turlough Herbert (D)	Ahane	0-06	6
1999	Turlough Herbert (R)	Ahane	0-06	6
2000	Gary Kirby	Patrickswell	0-12	12
2001	Conor Fitzgerald	Adare	0-07	7
2002	Conor Fitzgerald	Adare	0-05	5
2003	Conor Fitzgerald	Adare	0-10	10
2004	Niall Moran	Ahane	0-06	6
2004	Frankie Carroll	Garryspillane	0-06	6
2005	Andrew O'Shaughnessy	Kilmallock	1-04	7
2006	Stephen O'Halloran	Bruree	0-11	11
2007	Donncha Sheehan	Adare	0--5	5
2008	Conor Fitzgerald	Adare	0-07	7
2009	Diarmuid Sexton	Adare	1-03	6
2010	Donie Reale	Emmets	1-04	7
2011	Shane Dowling	Na Piarsaigh	1-10	13
2012	Declan Hannon	Adare	0-11	11
2013	Declan Hannon	Adare	0-07	7
2014	Eoin Ryan	Kilmallock	1-04	7
2015	Diarmaid Byrnes	Patrickswell	2-02	8
2015	Kevin Downes	Na Piarsaigh	1-05	8
2016	Aaron Gillane	Patrickswell	0-07	7
2017	Graeme Mulcahy	Kilmallock	1-04	7
2018	Shane Dowling	Na Piarsaigh	0-12	12
2020	Peter Casey	Na Piarsaigh	2-4	10

== See also ==
- Limerick Premier Intermediate Hurling Championship (Tier 2)
- Limerick Intermediate Hurling Championship (Tier 3)
- Limerick Premier Junior A Hurling Championship (Tier 4)
- Limerick Junior A Hurling Championship (Tier 5)
- Limerick Junior B Hurling Championship (Tier 6)
