= Ger O'Loughlin =

Irish hurler and manager

Gerard 'Sparrow' O'Loughlin
Personal information
- Native name: Gearóid Ó Lochlainn (Irish)
- Nickname: Sparrow
- Born: 5 September 1967 (age 59) Clarecastle, County Clare, Ireland
- Height: 5 ft 11 in (180 cm)

Sport
- Sport: Hurling
- Position: Full-forward
Club
- Years: Club
- 1980s–1990s: Clarecastle
Club titles
- Clare titles: 5
- Munster titles: 1
- All-Ireland Titles: 0
Inter-county
Years	County	Apps (scores)
1987–1999	Clare	28 (5–43)
Inter-county titles
- Munster titles: 3
- All-Irelands: 2
- NHL: 0
- All Stars: 2

Ger 'Sparrow' O'Loughlin (born 5 September 1967 in Clarecastle, County Clare, Ireland) is an Irish former hurling manager and former player.

An effective forward, O'Loughlin enjoyed a successful playing career at club level with Clarecastle and at inter-county level with Clare. He was a key member of the latter team during the 'golden age' of the 1990s and collected two All-Ireland titles and three Munster titles in the space of four years.

After a successful spell as manager of his native club Clarecastle, O'Loughlin took charge of the Adare club in Limerick. During his term the club captured three club championship titles in-a-row. O'Loughlin's tenure as manager of the Clare senior team last from 2009 until 2011 and ended without any success.

== Playing career ==
=== Club ===
O'Loughlin played his club hurling with his local team in Clarecastle and enjoyed much success during a golden age for the club. In 1986 he lined out in his first final of the county senior championship. O'Callaghan's Mills provided the opposition on that occasion, however, Clarecastle emerged as the winners. It was O'Loughlin's first county title.

In 1986 Clarecastle were back in a second consecutive county championship final. Feakle were the opponents on this occasion, however, Clarecastle made history by retaining the title for the first time. It was O'Loughlin's second county title. The club later represented Clare in the Munster and even reached the final of the competition. Borrisoleigh of Tipperary provided the opposition, however, O'Loughlin's side were defeated by 1–13 to 1–9.

Three-in-a-row proved beyond O'Loughlin's side, while Clarecastle were beaten by Sixmilebridge in the county final of 1989.

In 1991 O'Loughlin lined out in a fourth county championship decider. Scariff were the opponents, however, the title went to Clarecastle.

Three years later in 1994 Clarecastle were back in yet another county final. Up-and-coming club side St. Joseph's Doora-Barefield provided the opposition, however, they were no match for Clarecastle. O'Loughlin added a fourth county title to his collection inside of nine championship seasons.

Defeat in the county final of 1996 gave Clarecasle the impetus to make amends in 1997. St. Joseph's Doora-Barefield lined out in opposition, however, Clarecastle had too much and won the game. It was O'Loughlin's fifth county championship winners' medal. Clarecastle subsequently represented the county in the provincial club series of games and even reached the final. Limerick champions Patrickswell provided the opposition, however, a 2–11 to 0–15 score line gave Clarecastle the title and gave O'Loughlin a Munster club winners' medal. A defeat of St. Gabriel's of London in the All-Ireland quarter-final saw O'Loughlin's side advance to a semi-final meeting with Birr. A thrilling 1–15 to 3–9 draw was followed by an even more exciting replay with extra-time. A narrow 0–12 to 0–11 score line gave Birr the win and saw Clarecastle exit the championship.

This was O'Loughlin's last major occasion with Clarecastle. He retired from club hurling in 1999.

=== Inter-county ===
After enjoying little success with the Clare minor and under-21 hurlers, O'Loughlin quickly joined the senior hurling team for the 1986–87 National Hurling League. Clare reached the final of the competition that year and lined out against Galway. O'Loughlin's side just fell short that day and lost the game by 3–12 to 3–10.

The next few years proved to be an unhappy time for the Clare hurling team as they struggled against the traditional hurling powers in the provincial championship. O'Loughlin lined out in his first Munster final in 1993. Tipperary were the opponents on that occasion, however, the game turned out to be a complete disaster for Clare. A final score line of 3–27 to 2–12, in favour of Tipp, resulted in a humiliating trouncing for Clare.

In 1994 Clare were back in the Munster final for a second consecutive year. Limerick provided the opposition in O'Loughlin's second provincial decider; however, the result was a familiar one. Clare were completely overwhelmed and were trounced yet again by 0–25 to 2–10.

In 1995 Ger Loughnane took over as manager of the Clare senior hurling team and made sweeping changes. New fitness regimes and new personalised diets and, above all, a new psychological approach, resulted in the fittest and most prepared Clare team ever taking to the field for a third consecutive Munster final. Limerick were the opponents for a second consecutive year and took an early lead. Clare never surrendered and, thanks to an inspirational penalty by goalkeeper Davy FitzGerald, fought back to win by 1–17 to 0–11. It was O'Loughlin's first Munster title and Clare's first since 1932. A subsequent defeat of Galway gave Clare the right to line out in Croke Park for the All-Ireland final. Reigning champions Offaly provided the opposition on that occasion in what was the first ever meeting of these two sides in the championship. The game developed into a close affair with Offaly taking a half-time lead. Four minutes from the end substitute Éamonn Taaffe first timed a long range free straight into the net to give Clare a one-point lead. After a quick equaliser captain Anthony Daly calmly sent over a 65-metre free to give his team the lead again. Jamesie O'Connor pointed soon afterwards and at the full-time whistle Clare were the 1–13 to 2–8 winners. O'Loughlin had just won his first All-Ireland medal. He was later presented with an All-Star award.

In 1996 Clare dramatically lost their Munster and All-Ireland titles in a first-round meeting with Limerick. The winning point by Ciarán Carey has been described as one of the greatest match-winners of all time.

In 1997 Clare were back on form and reached the Munster final once again. Tipperary, a team regarded as one of the aristocrats of hurling, provided the opposition on that occasion. It was an occasion to savour for O'Loughlin as Clare won a close and exciting game by 1–18 to 0–18. It was his second Munster winners' medal. The introduction of the new 'back-door' system resulted in both Clare and Tipperary meeting for the second time in the first all-Munster All-Ireland final. The game itself was one of the best of the decade. Clare were well on top for much of the game, however, Liam Cahill and Eugene O'Neill scored twice for Tipp in the last ten minutes. John Leahy missed a goal chance in the last minute while another Tipp point was controversially ruled wide. At the full-time whistle Clare won by a single point – 0–20 to 2–13. In winning the 1997 All-Ireland final Clare defeated Cork, Kilkenny and Tipperary – the big three of hurling. In doing so they became only the second team ever, along with Waterford in 1959, to achieve this.

In 1998 Clare were once again the favourites to take a third All-Ireland title in four years. The Munster final victory over Waterford in a replay was an ill-tempered affair, with many citing it as the beginning of the end for Clare's great run of success. It was O'Loughlin's third Munster winners' medal. Clare's next game was an All-Ireland semi-final meeting with Offaly. Clare were the red-hot favourites, however, it took a late equaliser by Jamesie O'Connor to secure a draw. The replay was a bizarre affair. With two minutes left to play Clare were 1–16 to 2–10 ahead and looked destined for victory, however, referee Jimmy Cooney blew the full-time whistle. The Offaly supporters launched a sit-down protest on the pitch at Croke Park and a second replay was granted. By this stage O'Loughlin's side were exhausted and lost the game by 0–16 to 0–13.

O'Loughlin retired from hurling at the end of the 1999 championship.

== Managerial career ==
=== Early experience ===
Shortly after his retirement from hurling in 1999, O'Loughlin became involved as a selector with the Clarecastle senior hurling team. He spent three years with the club, however, he enjoyed little success during his first stint as a member of a managerial team.

In 2003 O'Loughlin became a selector under Cyril Lyons on the Clare senior hurling team. It was an unsuccessful year for 'the banner county'. After defeating Tipperary in the opening round of the Munster championship, Clare were subsequently defeated by Cork in the semi-final. A defeat by Galway in the All-Ireland qualifiers saw Clare exit the championship and brought an end to the county's managerial team.

=== Clarecastle ===
By 2005 O'Loughlin was back with Clarecastle, this time as manager of the club's senior hurling team. That year he guided his own native club to the county title following a 0–9 to 0–7 victory over Wolfe Tones. This victory gave him a unique distinction of winning club titles with Clarecastle as a player and as a manager.

=== Adare ===
O'Loughlin crossed the border from Clare to Limerick and took charge of club side Adare in time for the 2007 championship season. His first year in charge was a huge success as Adare qualified for their first county final since 2003. Nearby rivals Croom provided the opposition, however, the game was a largely one-sided affair. A 0–14 to 0–5 victory gave Adare the title and gave O'Loughlin his first success with the Limerick club.

A second consecutive appearance in the final of the county championship saw Adare take on hurling kingpins Ahane. O'Loughlin's side were supremely confident going into the game and easily won the game by 0–13 to 0–8.

In 2009 Adare set out to make history by winning a third county title in succession. O'Loughlin was expected to remain as manager, however, he announced his surprise intention to step down as manager at the club's annual dinner dance in March. He later reversed his decision and guided the club to their third consecutive appearance in the final of the county championship. Na Piarsaigh provided the opposition on that occasion, however, the game was a complete mismatch. A 1–17 to 0–3 trouncing gave Adare their third title in-a-row under O'Loughlin's management.

=== Clare ===
In 2009 the Clare senior hurling team was in crisis. After a disastrous showing in the National League and near relegation from the championship, a majority of the players retired from inter-county activity as they believed that it was time for team manager Mike McNamara to resign. This saga continued for many weeks. As the pressure mounted on McNamara to go, O'Loughlin was touted as a possible successor. Another contender for the yet to be vacated post was John Minogue, manager of the All-Ireland-winning Clare under-21 team.

On 17 December 2009, O'Loughlin was ratified by the Clare county board to succeed McNamara as manager of the county's senior hurling team. He was the only nominee for the position.

Clare started the year in Division 2 of the National Hurling League. They made it to the final where they faced Wexford but lost out 1–16 to 2–09. On 7 June 2010, he made his Championship debut as manager against Waterford in the 2010 Munster Senior Hurling Championship, where Clare lost by 1–15 to 0–22. Clare then entered the All-Ireland Qualifiers where they played Dublin, it was not a good day as Dublin ran out 2–22 to 0–15 winners ended Clare's year.

In 2011 Clare once more started the year in Division 2 of the league and for the second year in a row made the final. This time they faced fellow Munster side Limerick however they were on the losing side once more on a 4–12 to 2–13 scoreline. Clare started there Championship with a Munster Semi-final with All-Ireland Champions Tipperary, despite a brave showing four Tipperary goals proved the difference as they ran out 4–19 to 1–19 winners. Once again Clare entered the Qualifiers this time they took on Galway however they once again fell to a heavy loss 4–25 to 0–20. Following the loss O'Loughlin stepped down as manager on 7 July 2011.

=== Newtownshandrum ===
In 2013 O'Loughlin was appointed manager of the Newtownshandrum senior hurling team and beat Ballymartle in the first round of the cork championship.

== Playing honours ==
=== Clarecastle ===
- Munster Senior Club Hurling Championship:
  - Winner (1): 1997
- Clare Senior Hurling Championship:
  - Winner (5): 1986, 1987, 1991, 1994, 1997
  - Runner-up (2): 1989, 1996

=== Clare ===
- All-Ireland Senior Hurling Championship:
  - Winner (2): 1995, 1997
- Munster Senior Hurling Championship:
  - Winner (3): 1995, 1997, 1998
  - Runner-up (2): 1993, 1994
- National Hurling League:
  - Winner (0):
  - Runner-up (2): 1986–87, 1994–95

== Managerial honours ==
=== Kilmallock ===
- Limerick Senior Hurling Championship:
  - Winner (1): 2014

=== Adare ===
- Limerick Senior Hurling Championship:
  - Winner (3): 2007, 2008, 2009

=== Clarecastle ===
- Clare Senior Hurling Championship:
  - Winner (1): 2005

Sporting positions
Preceded by Mike McNamara	Clare Senior Hurling Manager; 2009–2011	Succeeded by Davy FitzGerald
