= Andrew O'Shaughnessy (hurler) =

Irish hurler

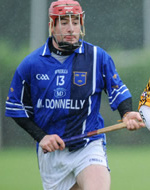
- O'Shaughnessy representing Munster in the 2008 Railway Cup hurling semi-final

Personal information
- Native name: Aindrias Ó Seachnasaigh (Irish)
- Born: 30 November 1984 (age 41) Limerick, Ireland
- Height: 1.78 m (5 ft 10 in)

Sport
- Sport: Hurling
- Position: Right corner forward
Club
- Years: Club
- 2001–: Kilmallock
Club titles
- Limerick titles: 3
Inter-county
Years	County	Apps (scores)
2002–2011	Limerick	33 (8–102)
Inter-county titles
- All Stars: 1

Andrew O'Shaughnessy (born 30 November 1984 in Kilmallock, County Limerick) is an Irish sportsperson. He plays hurling with his local club Kilmallock and was a member of the Limerick senior inter-county team from 2002 to 2011.

== Biography ==
Andrew O'Shaughnessy was born in Kilmallock, County Limerick in 1984. He was educated at his local primary school and later attended the famous St. Colman's College, Fermoy in Fermoy, County Cork, a virtual nursery for young hurling talent.

Here his hurling skills were first developed and he became a star on the college's various hurling teams. O'Shaughnessy enjoyed a very successful hurling career, beginning by capturing three Dean Ryan Cup titles in-a-row in 2000, 2001 and 2002. By this stage he was also a star on the St. Colman's senior hurling team. O'Shaughnessy won his first Dr. Harty Cup winners' medal in 2001. He later collected his first All-Ireland colleges' title when St. Colman's defeated Dublin Colleges in the final of that competition. O'Shaughnessy captured a second Harty Cup title in 2002 before later lining out in a second All-Ireland colleges' final. His scoring exploits in that game were spectacular. Gort CBS provided the opposition, however, O'Shaughnessy scored 2–8 of a total score of 2–10. It was his second All-Ireland winners' medal. 2003 saw O'Shaughnessy win a third consecutive Harty Cup winners' medal. The subsequent All-Ireland final saw St. Colman's take on St. Kieran's, however, victory went to the Kilkenny team on that occasion.

After completing a successful Leaving Certificate at St. Colman's O'Shaughnessy became a cadet in the Irish Army. He was commissioned as an army lieutenant and currently holds the rank of Commandant.

== Playing career ==
=== Club ===
O'Shaughnessy plays his club hurling with his local Kilmallock club and has enjoyed success. As a member of the club's minor hurling team he captured three consecutive county titles in 2000, 2001 and 2002. The latter final saw O'Shaughnessy give a scoring exhibition once again. In that game they beat Na Piarsaigh by 4–11 to 2–11. Three of their 11 points were scored in a gripping last 10 minutes, the previous 4–9 had come from the hurley of Andrew O'Shaughnessy in a glorious 50-minute spell of individual brilliance.

O'Shaughnessy later joined the club's under-21 team, however, he enjoyed little success in this grade. Around the same time he joined the Kilmallock senior team. He lined out in the senior county final in 2005, however, Garryspillane were victorious on that occasion by 2–15 to 2–12.

=== Minor and under-21 ===
O'Shaughnessy first came to prominence on the inter-county scene as a member of the Limerick minor hurling team in the early 2000s. He had little success in this grade and later joined the county's under-21 team where he first tasted inter-county glory. 2002 saw Limerick reach the provincial decider for the third year in-a-row, however, it was O'Shaughnessy's first year as full member of the team. After an exciting contest with Tipperary, which included extra-time, Limerick won the game by 1–20 to 2–14. It was his O'Shaughnessy's first Munster under-21 winners' medal. For the third year in-a-row Limerick lined out in the All-Ireland final with Galway providing the opposition. O'Shaughnessy's side powered to a 3–17 to 0–8 victory. It was his first, and only, All-Ireland under-21 winners' medal.

=== Senior ===
In 2003 O'Shaughnessy made his senior championship debut in a Munster semi-final against Waterford. Both sides drew level on that occasion, however, Limerick lost the replay and continued their streak of bad luck that had lasted since 2001 when they were dumped out of the championship in the All-Ireland qualifiers. The next few years proved difficult for both O'Shaughnessy and for Limerick. In spite of coming close to creating some hurling upsets, defeat seemed to be Limerick's lot.

In 2006 Limerick remained unbeaten throughout the entire National Hurling League campaign and qualified for the final against Kilkenny. It was an unhappy day for Limerick as 'the Cats' won the game by 3–11 0–14. In spite of some success in the league, Limerick's championship form was still below par.

All this changed in 2007 when Limerick had one of their best seasons. That year Limerick faced near neighbours Tipperary in the semi-final of the Munster championship. That game ended in a draw with both sides scoring 1–19. The replay saw Limerick in arrears by ten points at half-time, however, Limerick rallied to level the game at the end of normal time. A period of extra time had to be played and O'Shaughnessy turned out to be the hero as he scored the equalising point which meant that the sides had to play for a third time. Once again, Limerick looked vulnerable at times during the game, however, they grinded out a victory with a score line of 0–22 to 2–13. It was Limerick's first win in the Munster championship since 2001. O'Shaughnessy later lined out against Waterford in the Munster final, however, they were defeated on a score line of 3–17 to 1–14. These two sides later met again in the All-Ireland semi-final, however, manager Richie Bennis had done his homework and masterminded a magnificent 5–11 to 2–15 victory over the Munster champions. This victory allowed O'shaughnessy's side to play Kilkenny in the championship decider. Unfortunately, Limerick got off to a bad start with goalkeeper Brian Murray letting in two goals by Eddie Brennan and Henry Shefflin in the first ten minutes. Limerick fought back, however 'the Cats' went on to win the game by seven points. In spite of this loss O'Shaughnessy was later presented with his first All-Star award, marking him out as one of the best players of the championship.

After the highs of the previous year, 2008 proved to be a difficult year for the Limerick hurlers. The team were beaten by 4–12 to 1–16 in opening game of the championship by Clare. The newly structured qualifier system pitted O'Shaughnessy's side against Offaly in a must-win game. Limerick, however, were out of sorts as they suffered a surprising 3–19 to 0–18 defeat. Limerick's involvement in the championship came to an end following this defeat. In late 2009 O'Shaughnessy was diagnosed with sclerosis but remained to feature during the league. In April 2011 just three days before the National Hurling League Division 2 final, O'Shaughnessy announced his retirement from Inter-County hurling.

=== Provincial ===
O'Shaughnessy has also lined out with Munster in the Railway Cup inter-provincial competition. He first lined out with his province in 2002, however, Munster were defeated by arch-rivals Leinster in the final. His inclusion on the team that year marks him out as the youngest Munster man to ever play for his province. It was 2006 before O'Shaughnessy played with Munster again. On that occasion Connacht were the victors in the semi-final of the competition. After an absence the following year O'Shaughnessy was back on the team in 2008. Once again Munster reached the final, however, Leinster were the winners on that occasion.

== Honours ==
- Dr. Harty Cup (3): 2001, 2002, 2003 (c)
- Dr. Croke Cup (2): 2001, 2002
- Munster Under-21 Hurling Championship (2): 2001, 2002
- All-Ireland Under-21 Hurling Championship (2): 2001, 2002
- Limerick Senior Hurling Championsphip (3): 2010, 2012, 2014
- Munster Senior Club Hurling Championship (1): 2014
- Limerick Minor Hurling Championship (3) 2000, 2001, 2002 (c)
- Limerick Under-21 Hurling Championship (1) 2002

== Championship appearances ==
#	Date	Venue	Opponent	Score	Result	Competition	Match report
1	29 June 2002	Semple Stadium, Thurles	Cork	0–0	1–15 : 1–16	Group stage Qualifier	Irish Examiner
2	1 June 2003	Semple Stadium, Thurles	Waterford	1–1	4–13 : 4–13	Munster Semi-final	Irish Examiner
3	28 June 2003	Austin Stack Park, Tralee	Kerry	0–1	0–24 : 1–14	Group stage Qualifier	Breaking News
4	17 July 2003	Semple Stadium, Thurles	Offaly	0–1	0–14 : 1–18	Group stage Qualifier	Irish Examiner
5	30 May 2004	Gaelic Grounds, Limerick	Cork	0–0	2–12 : 1–18	Munster Semi-final	Irish Examiner
6	26 June 2004	Gaelic Grounds, Limerick	Tipperary	2–1	2–12 : 3–10	3rd round Qualifier	Irish Examiner
7	15 May 2005	Semple Stadium, Thurles	Tipperary	0–0	2–14 : 2–14	Munster Quarter-Final
8	21 May 2005	Gaelic Grounds, Limerick	Tipperary	0–1	0–18 : 2–13	Munster Quarter-Final Replay
9	25 June 2005	Casement Park, Belfast	Antrim	1–1	4–25 : 1–9	Group stage Qualifier
10	1 July 2005	O'Moore Park, Portlaoise	Laois	0–2	2–15 : 1–9	Group stage Qualifier
11	9 July 2005	Gaelic Grounds, Limerick	Galway	0–0	1–18 : 2–14	Group stage Qualifier
12	31 July 2005	Croke Park, Dublin	Kilkenny	0–1	0–13 : 0–18	All-Ireland Quarter-Final	www.hoganstand.com
13	14 May 2006	Semple Stadium, Thurles	Tipperary	1–1	2–12 : 0–22	Munster Quarter-Final	www.hoganstand.com
14	18 June 2006	Cusack Park, Ennis	Clare	0–0	0–10 : 2–21	Group stage Qualifier	www.hoganstand.com
15	1 July 2006	O'Connor Park, Tullamore	Offaly	0–7	2–29 : 2–19	Group stage Qualifier	www.hoganstand.com
16	9 July 2006	Gaelic Grounds, Limerick	Dublin	0–4	2–16 : 1–13	Group stage Qualifier	www.hoganstand.com
17	22 July 2006	Semple Stadium, Thurles	Cork	0–5	0–18 : 0–19	All-Ireland Quarter-Final	www.hoganstand.com
18	10 June 2007	Gaelic Grounds, Limerick	Tipperary	0–6	1–19 : 1–19	Munster Semi-final	www.hoganstand.com
19	16 June 2007	Semple Stadium, Thurles	Tipperary	0–6	0–24 : 1–21	Munster Semi-final Replay
20	24 June 2007	Gaelic Grounds, Limerick	Tipperary	0–6	0–22 : 2–13	Munster Semi-final 2nd Replay	www.hoganstand.com
21	8 July 2007	Semple Stadium, Thurles	Waterford	0–3	1–14 : 3–17	Munster Final	www.hoganstand.com
22	29 July 2007	Croke Park, Dublin	Clare	0–11	1–23 : 1–15	All-Ireland Quarter-Final	www.hoganstand.com
23	12 August 2007	Croke Park, Dublin	Waterford	2–7	5–11 : 2–15	All-Ireland Semi-final	www.hoganstand.com
24	2 September 2007	Croke Park, Dublin	Kilkenny	0–7	1–15 : 2–19	All-Ireland Final	www.hoganstand.com
25	22 June 2008	Semple Stadium, Thurles	Clare	0–6	1–16 : 4–12	Munster Semi-final	www.hoganstand.com
26	12 July 2008	Gaelic Grounds, Limerick	Offaly	0–4	0–18 : 3–19	3rd round Qualifier	www.hoganstand.com
27	14 June 2009	Semple Stadium, Thurles	0–1	1-08 : 0–11	Munster Senior Hurling Championship
