= Conor Fitzgerald (hurler) =

Irish sportsperson

Personal information
- Native name: Conchur Mac Gearailt (Irish)
- Born: 1981 (age 44–45) Adare, County Limerick, Ireland
- Occupation: Hotel manager

Sport
- Sport: Hurling.
- Position: Left wing-forward
Club
- Years: Club
- Adare
Club titles
- Limerick titles: 5
Inter-county
Years	County	Apps (scores)
2003-2006	Limerick	14 (1-34)
Inter-county titles
- Munster titles: 0
- All-Irelands: 0
- NHL: 0
- All Stars: 0

Conor Fitzgerald (born 1981 in Adare, County Limerick, Ireland) is an Irish sportsperson. He plays hurling with his local club Adare and was a member of the Limerick senior inter-county team from 2003 until 2006.
