= Bruree GAA =

Sports club in County Limerick, Ireland

Bruree
- Brú Rí
- Founded: 1893
- County: Limerick
- Colours: Blue and white
- Grounds: Bruree

Playing kits
Standard colours

Senior Club Championships
	All Ireland	Munster champions	Limerick champions
Hurling:	0	0	2

Bruree GAA club is a Gaelic Athletic Association club located in Bruree, County Limerick, Ireland. The club fields teams in both hurling and Gaelic football.

== Honours ==
- Limerick Senior Hurling Championship (2): 1893, 2006
- Limerick Junior Football Championship: 2010

== Notable players ==
- Stephen McDonagh
- Jim O' Brien
- James O'Brien
