= Garryspillane GAA =

Gaelic games club in County Limerick, Ireland

Garryspillane
- Garrdha Uí Spiolláin
- Founded: 1952
- County: Limerick
- Nickname: The Bouncers
- Colours: Black and amber
- Grounds: Knocklong Sports Field

Playing kits
Standard colours

Senior Club Championships
	All Ireland	Munster champions	Limerick champions
Hurling:	0	0	1

Garryspillane GAA club is a Gaelic Athletic Association club located in the parish of Knocklong/Glenbrohane, County Limerick, Ireland. The club was founded in 1952 and is almost exclusively concerned with hurling with footballers catered for by neighbouring Galbally.

== Location ==
The club is located in the parish of Knocklong/Glenbrohane in south east County Limerick on the border with County Tipperary. The parish is situated 35 km south of Limerick City between the Galtee and Ballyhoura Mountains. The neighbouring clubs are Galbally, with whom Garryspillane members play Gaelic Football, Ballylanders, Glenroe, Blackrock, Staker Wallace, Knockainey, Hospital Herbertstown and Emly in Tipperary. The club is a member of the south division of Limerick GAA.

== Notable hurlers ==
- T.J Ryan-played intercounty hurling for Limerick and captained the side on 2 different occasions in 2004 and 2006,
- Frankie Carroll-Played intercounty hurling for Limerick,
- Mossie Carroll-Played intercounty hurling for Limerick,
- Brian Carroll-Played intercounty hurling for Limerick,
- Ray Sampson-Played intercounty hurling for Limerick,
- John Kiely-Played intercounty hurling for Limerick and manager of Senior Hurling team

== Honours ==
- All Ireland Sevens (1): 2003
- Limerick Senior Hurling Championship (1): 2005
- Limerick Senior B Hurling Championship (1): 2004
- Limerick Premier Intermediate Hurling Championship (2): 2018, 2025
- Limerick Under-21 County Hurling Championship (3): 1969, 1995, 2003
- Limerick Senior All County League (2) 2001, 2002
- Limerick Intermediate Hurling Championship (2) 1990, 1996
- Limerick Junior Hurling Championship (4) 1960, 1970, 1978, 1984
- Limerick Senior All County Hurling League (2) 2001, 2002
- Limerick Junior Football Championship (3) 1976, 1980, 1993
- Limerick Minor Football Championship (1) 1994
- Limerick Premier Minor Hurling Championship (2) 2017, 2018
