= Na Piarsaigh GAA (Limerick) =

Gaelic games club in County Limerick, Ireland

- Na Piarsaigh
- Founded: 1968
- County: Limerick
- Colours
- Grounds: Páirc Uí Dromgúil, Elm Drive, Caherdavin, Limerick
- Coordinates: 52°40′15.43″N 8°40′7.01″W

Playing kits
Standard colours

Senior Club Championships
	All Ireland	Munster champions	Limerick champions
Hurling:	1	4	8

Na Piarsaigh (Irish pronunciation: [n̪ˠə ˈpʲiəɾˠsˠiː], na PEER-see) is a Gaelic Athletic Association club situated on the north side of Limerick City, Ireland. It was founded in 1968. Following their 2-8 to 2-6 victory in the 2022 Limerick Intermediate Football Championship over Dromcollogher Broadford, Na Piarsaigh are one of four dual senior clubs in hurling and Gaelic football in Limerick. As of 2024, the club fields five adult teams three in hurling (senior, Intermediate & Junior) and two in football (Senior & Junior), the most of any club in Limerick.

== History ==
=== Formation ===
Na Piarsaigh GAA Club was formed in early 1968. Its formation was initiated in the industrial boom time of the 1960s and the inaugural meeting was held in the Ardhú House Hotel on Tuesday 16 January 1968 when the attendance included Rev.Fr.J.Browne C.C and three officials of the Limerick County Board – Jackie O'Connell, chairman; Tom Boland, secretary and Mick O'Brien, treasurer.

Opening the meeting, Noel Drumgoole said that the attendance levels were heartening and an indication of the interest in the formation of the GAA club in the parish. He paid tribute to Treaty Sarsfields for their work in promoting Gaelic games on the north side of the city, but stressed that in view of the considerable housing development in areas such as Greystones, Highfield, Mayorstone, Clareview and Caherdavin a new club, which initially would cater solely for underage players, was a necessity.

Jackie O'Connell expressed his "delight" at the formation of the club and promised the full support of the county board. He outlined details of the various grants which were available for the purchase and development of a playing field and mentioned that consideration was given by the Central Council of the GAA, by way of additional grants to clubs in city areas.

Fr. Browne spoke at length on the importance of providing recreational facilities for the youth of the parish.

After several suggestions were made, it was unanimously agreed that the club would be called "Cumann Na Piarsaigh". It was agreed that, for 1968, the Na Piarsaigh club would enter teams in the City Bord na nÓg competitions in the under 14, 15 and 16 grades in both hurling and football. Street leagues and challenge games were also arranged.

Pending the purchase of land, the club decided to avail of the offer of a playing pitch in Caherdavin. In accordance with top level GAA policy, the meeting decided that Na Piarsaigh would emphasise social activities for the members and it was envisaged that a pavilion and Pitch and Putt course would also be included in their proposed pitch and complex.

=== Underage development ===
Na Piarsaigh's underage teams have had some successes at both divisional and county level. These include winning the U14 All Ireland Féile na nGeal Hurling Championship in 1984. The club's underage development program involves links with the local schools. Many of Na Piarsaigh's younger players attend Scoil Chríost Rí Caherdavin or John F. Kennedy memorial school. There is also a link to the local secondary school, Ardscoil Rís, with Na Piarsaigh players making contributions to the successful Dr. Harty Cup panels of 2010, 2011 and 2014.

=== 21st century ===
In 2011, Na Piarsaigh won their first ever Munster Senior Club Hurling Championship. In November 2015, Na Piarsaigh won their third Munster Senior Club Hurling Championship after a 2–18 to 2–11 win against Ballygunner in the final. On St Patrick's Day, 2016 Na Piarsaigh won their first ever All-Ireland Senior Club Hurling Championship beating Ruairí Óg, Cushendall 2–25 to 2–14 in Croke Park, becoming the first ever Limerick club to do so. In December 2022 Na Piarsaigh won the Limerick Intermediate Hurling Championship beating Croagh-Kilfinny 1-19 to 0-14, earning promotion to the Limerick Premier Intermediate Hurling Championship for 2023 and are the only club in Limerick to field teams in both the Limerick Senior Hurling Championship & Limerick Premier Intermediate Hurling Championship.

== Honours ==
Hurling

- All-Ireland Senior Club Hurling Championship (1) – 2016
- Munster Senior Club Hurling Championship (4) – 2011, 2013, 2015, 2017
- Limerick Senior Hurling Championship (9) – 2011, 2013, 2015., 2017, 2018, 2020, 2022, 2023, 2025
- Limerick Intermediate Hurling Championship (1) – 1994, 2022
- Limerick Junior Hurling Championship (2) – 1990, 2016
- Limerick Junior B Hurling Championship (1) – 1991
- Limerick Under-21 Hurling Championship (12) – 1989, 1990, 1993, 1995, 2004, 2010, 2012, 2013, 2014, 2015, 2016, 2017
- Limerick Minor Hurling Championship (4) – 1989, 1992, 2011, 2016
- All Ireland Féile na nGael Championship (1) – 1984

Football

- Limerick Intermediate Football Championship (3) – 1975, 2014, 2022
- Limerick Junior A Football Championship (1) – 2006
- Limerick Under-21 B Football championship (1) – 2011
- Limerick Under-21 Football Championship (2) – 1973, 1997
- Limerick Minor Football Championship (2) – 1981, 1994

== Notable players ==
=== Inter-county hurlers ===
- Damien Quigley, GAA hurling All-Star recipient 1994
- Shane O'Neill, former Na Piarsaigh hurling manager
- Mike Casey
- Cathal King, former club hurling captain
- William O'Donoghue, club hurling captain and 2021 hurling All-Star
- Shane Dowling, GAA hurling All-Star recipient 2014
- David Breen
- Adrian Breen
- Kevin Downes
- Peter Casey, 2021 hurling All-Star
- Ronan Lynch
- Conor Boylan
- Jerome Boylan

=== Inter-county footballers ===
- Maurice Horan, former Limerick senior football team manager
