= Ahane GAA =

Gaelic games club in County Limerick, Ireland

Ahane
- Áthán
- Founded: 1926
- County: Limerick
- Colours
- Grounds: Mackey Park
- Coordinates: 52°41′29.69″N 8°30′57.59″W

Playing kits
Standard colours

Senior Club Championships
	All Ireland	Munster champions	Limerick champions
Football:	0	0	5
Hurling:	0	0	19
Camogie:	0	4	10

Ahane GAA Club is a Gaelic Athletic Association club in Lisnagry, County Limerick, Ireland. The club is affiliated to the Limerick County Board and fields teams in both hurling and Gaelic football.

== History ==
Located in the Ahane, Castleconnell and Montpelier areas of East Limerick, Ahane GAA Club was founded on 22 November 1926. The new club played its first ever match three weeks later, but lost out to Newport. The Ahane GAA Club committee affiliated both junior and senior teams for the respective championships in 1927.

The Ahane club was in its infancy when it made the breakthrough by winning the Limerick SHC title after a defeat of Croom in 1931. This victory ushered in an unprecedented 25-year period of success. Ahane won seven successive Limerick SHC titles between 1933 and 1939. Defeat by Croom in successive finals was followed by Ahane claiming another seven successive titles between 1942 and 1948. The club also won five successive Limerick SFC titles between 1935 and 1939.

Ahane won their 16th Limerick SHC title in 1955, a victory which put them at the top of the all-time roll of honour. After dominating the championship since their foundation, Ahane failed to win another title until 1998. The club retained the title in 1999, before winning a record-setting 19th Limerick SHC in 2004.

Founded: 1926

County: Limerick

Colours: Green and Gold

Grounds: Mackey Park, Newgarden,Lisnagry, Co. Limerick V94 EK59

== Honours ==
- Limerick Senior Hurling Championship (19): 1931, 1933, 1934, 1935, 1936, 1937, 1938, 1939, 1942, 1943, 1944, 1945, 1946, 1947, 1948, 1955, 1998, 1999, 2004
- Limerick Senior Football Championship (5): 1935, 1936, 1937, 1938, 1939
- Limerick Junior Hurling Championship (2): 1928, 1930
- Limerick Minor Hurling Championship (4): 1930, 1940, 1991, 2014
- Munster Senior Club Camogie Championship (4): 1968, 1969, 1972, 1976
- Limerick Senior Camogie Championship (10): 1967, 1968, 1969, 1970, 1971, 1972, 1973, 1976, 2018, 2022

== Notable players ==
- Mick Mackey: All-Ireland SHC-winner (1934, 1936, 1940)
- John Mackey: All-Ireland SHC-winner (1934, 1936, 1940)
- Dan Morrissey: All-Ireland SHC-winner (2018, 2020, 2021, 2022, 2023, 2026)
- Tom Morrissey: All-Ireland SHC-winner (2018, 2020, 2021, 2022, 2023, 2026)
- Ollie Moran: National Hurling League-winner (1997)
- Niall Moran: Munster Senior Hurling Championship winner (2013)
- Timmy Ryan: All-Ireland SHC-winner (1934, 1936, 1940)
