= 1993 Limerick Senior Hurling Championship =

Annual hurling competition season

- Dates: 27 June – 26 September 1993
- Teams: 18
- Champions: Patrickswell (13th title); Paul Foley (captain); P. J. O'Grady (manager)
- Runners-up: Adare; Dave Keane (manager)

Tournament statistics
- Matches played: 17
- Goals scored: 57 (3.35 per match)
- Points scored: 380 (22.35 per match)
- Top scorer(s): Gary Kirby (1–32)

The 1993 Limerick Senior Hurling Championship was the 99th staging of the Limerick Senior Hurling Championship since its establishment by the Limerick County Board in 1888. The draw for the preliminary and first round pairings took place on 16 February 1993. The championship ran from 27 June to 26 September 1993.

Kilmallock were the defending champions, however, they were beaten by Doon in the quarter-finals.

On 26 September 1993, Patrickswell won the championship after a 0–17 to 0–07 defeat of Adare in the final. It was their 13th championship title overall and their first title in three championship seasons.

Patrickswell's Gary Kirby was the championship's top scorer with 1–32.

== Results ==
=== Preliminary round ===
27 June 1993 Preliminary round	Cappamore	0–15 – 2–11	Hospital-Herbertstown	Bruff Sportsfield
	L O'Brien 0–7, D McKenna 0–2, N Sheehan 0–2, J McCarthy 0–1, D McCarthy 0–1, M Gleeson 0–1, P Gleeson 0–1.		A Garvey 1–5, L Garvey 1–2, J Allen 0–2, PJ Garvey 0–2.

27 June 1993 Preliminary round	Bruree	0–07 – 1–10	Ballybrown	Bruff Sportsfield
	M Mullane 0–4, D Deady 0–3.		C Keyes 1–4, P Davoren 0–4, T Hall 0–2.

=== First round ===
4 July 1993 First round	Claughaun	4–16 – 3–09	Feohanagh	FitzGerald Park
	M Galligan 2–3, D Holmes 1–2, L O'Connor 0–5, M Ryan 1–1, G Ryan 0–2, P Galligan 0–1, A Browne 0–1, V Browne 0–1.		T Quaid 1–5, P Quaid 1–2, S Roche 1–0, P Hough 0–1, C Phillips 0–1

4 July 1993 First round	Ahane	2–12 – 4–09	Adare	Fr Hayes Memorial Park
	G Mulcahy 0–6, T Herbert 1–1, T Mescall 1–0, J O'Grady 0–1, T Collins 0–1, M Fitzgerald 0–1, J Foley 0–1, J Moran 0–1, J O'Grady 0–1.		M Foley 2–0, K Costello 1–2, S Fitzgibbon 1–1, A Howard 0–3, D Marron 0–2, B Heffernan 0–1.

11 July 1993 First round	Doon	1–11 – 0–07	Old Christians	Fr Hayes Memorial Park
	P Coleman 0–7, M Ryan 1–0, K McGrath 0–2, V McGrath 0–2.		J Howard 0–3, R McCarthy 0–2, A Maher 0–1, J Hegarty 0–1.

11 July 1993 First round	Bruff	1–14 – 2–04	Geraldines	Gaelic Grounds
	JA Moran 0–7, J Fitzgerald 1–1, M Reale 0–3, A Madden 0–1, J Hogan 0–1, T Coleman 0–1.		A Ryan 1–1, M Murnane 1–1, N O'Connor 0–2.

11 July 1993 First round	KIlmallock	1–11 – 0–08	South Liberties	Gaelic Grounds
	M Cronin 1–2, P Kelly 0–5, M Houlihan 0–2, D Barry 0–1, P Tobin 0–1.		P Donnellan 0–3, N Godfrey 0–2, B Finn 0–1, N Nash 0–1, A Godfrey 0–1.

18 July 1993 First round	Western Gaels	2–12 – 2–09	Hospital-Herbertstown	FitzGerald Park
	M Downes 1–2, G Galvin 0–5, P O'Connor 1–0, S O'Sullivan 0–1, C O'Connor 0–1, S Stapleton 0–1, D McMahon 0–1, T Doyle 0–1.		L Garvey 1–2, D McAuliffe 1–0, PJ Garvey 0–3, J Allen 0–2, A Garvey 0–1, P O'Connor 0–1.

18 July 1993 First round	Patrickswell	2–16 – 2–08	Ballybrown	Gaelic Grounds
	G Kirby 0–8, C Carey 1–3, P Buston 1–1, S Kirby 0–2, S Carey 0–1, D O'Grady 0–1.		J Mann 1–1, P Mulqueen 1–0, P Davoren 0–2, O O'Connor 0–2, T Kenny 0–2, C Keyes 0–1.

18 July 1993 First round	Emmets	2–16 – 4–08	Killeedy	FitzGerald Park
	F Carroll 0–10, M Wallace 2–1, TJ Ryan 0–3, J Bresnihan 0–1, P Davern 0–1.		T Magner 1–3, D Flynn 1–1, M Kelly 1–0, P Fitzmaurice 1–0, J Fitzgibbon 0–2, G Kelly 0–1, M Magner 0–1.

=== Quarter-finals ===
25 July 1993 Quarter-final	Adare	1–13 – 0–12	Bruff	Gaelic Grounds
	A Howard 1–3, S Fitzgibbon 0–5, B Heffernan 0–3, B Kennedy 0–1, D Marron 0–1.		JA Moran 0–5, J Mulqueen 0–3, J Riordan 0–2, T Madden 0–2.

25 July 1993 Quarter-final	Doon	3–11 – 2–12	Kilmallock	Gaelic Grounds
	P Coleman 0–7, V McGrath 1–1, J O'Donovan 1–1, P Moloney 1–0, G McGrath 0–1, L Ryan 0–1.		M Houlihan 2–3, P Kelly 0–4, B Hanley 0–1, D Clarke 0–1, P Tobin 0–1, P Dowling 0–1, T Nelligan 0–1.

15 August 1993 Quarter-final	Patrickswell	0–20 – 2–09	Western Gaels	FitzGerald Park
	G Kirby 0–10, S Kirby 0–4, N Carey 0–2, C Carey 0–2, D O'Grady 0–1, R Fitzgerald 0–1.		G Galvin 1–2, D Wolfe 1–1, P O'Connor 0–2, M Downes 0–2.

15 August 1993 Quarter-final	Claughaun	3–15 – 3–08	Emmets	Bruff SPortsfield
	M Galligan 1–9, I O'Brien 1–0, M Ryan 1–0, G Ryan 0–3, P Galligan 0–1, A Browne 0–1, L O'Connor 0–1.		R Sampson 2–0, F Carroll 0–4, R Fenton 1–0, J Fitzgerald 0–1, TJ Ryan 0–1, M Meade 0–1, M Wallace 0–1.

=== Semi-finals ===
22 August 1993 Semi-final	Adare	4–13 – 1–09	Doon	Bruff SPortsfield
	S Fitzgibbon 1–4, K Costello 1–2, A Howard 1–2, M Foley 1–2, B Heffernan 0–2, M Alfred 0–1.		M Ryan 1–2, P Coleman 0–4, V McGrath 0–1, B McLoughlin 0–1, J Stokes 0–1.

12 September 1993 Semi-final	Patrickswell	3–15 – 0–09	Claughaun	Gaelic Grounds
	G Kirby 1–6, D O'Grady 1–1, R Fitzgerald 1–0, N Carey 0–3, S Kirby 0–3, A Carmody 0–1, C Carey 0–1.		M Galligan 0–4, D Fitzgerald 0–2, G Ryan 0–1, A Browne 0–1, L O'Connor 0–1.

=== Final ===
26 September 1993 Final	Patrickswell	0–17 – 0–07	Adare	Gaelic Grounds
	G Kirby 0–8, C Carey 0–3, D O'Grady 0–2, S Carey 0–2, R Fitzgerald 0–1, A Carmody 0–1.		S Fitzgibbon 0–3, A Howard 0–2, M Foley 0–1, T Houlihan 0–1.	Referee: P O'Connor (Ahane)

== Championship statistics ==
=== Top scorers ===
Overall

Rank	Player	Club	Tally	Total	Matches	Average
1	Gary Kirby	Patrickswell	1–32	35	4	8.75
2	Mike Galligan	Claughaun	3–16	25	3	8.33
3	Shane Fitzgibbon	Adare	2–13	19	4	4.75
4	Pat Coleman	Doon	0–18	18	3	6.00
5	Tony Howard	Adare	2–10	16	4	4.00
6	Frankie Carroll	Emmets	0–14	14	2	7.00
7	Mark Foley	Adare	3-03	12	4	3.00
7	Ciarán Carey	Patrickswell	1–09	12	4	3.00
7	John A. Moran	Bruff	0–12	12	2	6.00
10	Mike Houlihan	Kilmallock	2–05	11	2	5.50

Single game

Rank	Player	Club	Tally	Total	Opposition
1	Mike Galligan	Claughaun	1–09	12	Emmets
2	Gary Kirby	Patrickswell	0–10	10	Western Gaels
2	Frankie Carroll	Emmets	1–09	12	Killeedy
4	Mike Houlihan	Kilmallock	2–03	9	Doon
4	Mike Galligan	Claughaun	2–03	9	Feohanagh
4	Gary Kirby	Patrickswell	1–06	9	Claughaun
7	Andy Garvey	Hospital-Herbertstown	1–05	8	Cappamore
7	Tommy Quaid	Feohanagh	1–05	8	Claughaun
7	Gary Kirby	Patrickswell	0–08	8	Adare
7	Gary Kirby	Patrickswell	0–08	8	Ballybrown
