= 2012 Limerick Senior Hurling Championship =

Annual hurling competition season

- Dates: 11 May – 7 October 2012
- Teams: 16
- Sponsor: Live95fm
- Champions: Kilmallock (9th title); Paudie O'Brien (captain); Tony Considine (manager)
- Runners-up: Adare; Paul Keane (captain); Ger O'Loughlin (manager)
- Relegated: Granagh-Ballingarry

Tournament statistics
- Matches played: 34
- Goals scored: 95 (2.79 per match)
- Points scored: 897 (26.38 per match)
- Top scorer(s): Shane Dowling (3–37)

The 2012 Limerick Senior Hurling Championship was the 118th staging of the Limerick Senior Hurling Championship since its establishment by the Limerick County Board in 1887. The championship ran from 11 May to 7 October 2012.

Na Piarsaigh entered the championship as the defending champions, however, they were beaten by Kilmallock in the semi-finals.

The final was played on 7 October 2012 at the Gaelic Grounds in Limerick, between Kilmallock and Adare, in what was their first ever meeting in the final. Kilmallock won the match by 1–15 to 0–15 to claim their ninth championship title overall and a first title in two years.

Na Piarsaigh's Shane Dowling was the championship's top scorer with 3–37.

== Participating teams ==
Team	Colours	Manager	Captain
Adare	Red and black	Ger O'Loughlin	Paul Keane
Ahane	Green and yellow	John Meskell	Johnny Meskell
Bruree	Blue and white	Pat Bennett	
Croom	Blue and white	Seán Treacy	Thomas Carmody
Doon	Red and white	Niall Maher	Roger Maher
Effin	Green and white	Ger Power	Nickie Quaid
Emmets	Blue and yellow	Fintan Leahy	Brian Moloney
Garryspillane	Black and amber	Anthony O'Brien	Donie Ryan
Granagh-Ballingarry	Green and black	Gerry O'Donovan	Denis O'Connor
Hospital-Herbertstown	Maroon and black	Liam Garvey	Mike Fitzgerald
Kilmallock	Green and white	Tony Considine	Paudie O'Brien
Knockainey	Black and white	Val Murnane	Ger O'Shea
Murroe/Boher	Blue and green	Ger Hegarty	
Na Piarsaigh	Blue and navy	Seán Stack	
Patrickswell	Blue and yellow	Brian Lohan	Eoin Foley
South Liberties	Green and yellow	Seán Hehir	Shane O'Neill

== Group 1 ==
=== Group 1 table ===
Knockout stage Relegation stage

Team	Matches				Score			Pts
Team	Pld	W	D	L	For	Against	Diff	Pts
Emmets	3	2	0	1	45	63	−18	4
Adare	3	1	1	1	62	36	26	3
Bruree	3	1	1	1	44	47	−3	3
Granagh-Ballingarry	3	1	0	2	51	56	−5	2

=== Group 1 results ===
12 May 2012 Round 1	Adare	1–14 – 3–10	Granagh-Ballingarry	Newcastle West Grounds
	W Griffin 0–8, J Fitzgibbon 1–4, D Sheehan 0–1, J Hannon 0–1.		D O'Connor 1–7, N Kennedy 1–1, K O'Connor 1–0, B Hanley 0–1, E Chawke 0–1.

13 May 2012 Round 1	Emmets	3–10 – 1–11	Bruree	FitzGerald Park
	E Walsh 2–4, R McCarthy 1–0, P O'Leary 0–2, P Leahy 0–1, S Walsh 0–1, D Moloney 0–1, D Reidy 0–1.		K O'Dea 0–6, M Lane 1–1, G O'Brien 0–2, JV O'Brien 0–1, T O'Brien 0–1.

3 June 2012 Round 2	Granagh-Ballingarry	1–12 – 0–20	Emmets	Ballyagran Grounds
	D O'Connor 1–5, E Chawke 0–3, K O'Connor 0–2, K Carroll 0–1, D Condron 0–1.		P Leahy 0–6, P O'Leary 0–3, D McCarthy 0–3, E Walsh 0–3, P Neenan 0–2, R McCarthy 0–1, B Kelleher 0–1, D Moloney 0–1.

2 June 2012 Round 2	Bruree	1–08 – 0–11	Adare	Ballingarry Grounds
	K O'Dea 0–4, G O'Dea 1–0, T O'Brien 0–2, G O'Brien 0–1, S Mullane 0–1.		W Griffin 0–5, J Fitzgibbon 0–2, D Hannon 0–1, W McNamara 0–1, N Mulvihill 0–1, P Keane 0–1.

5 August 2012 Round 3	Emmets	0–06 – 5–19	Adare	Ballyagran Grounds
	M O'Connell 0–2, D McCarthy 0–1, P Neenan 0–1, T Crawford 0–1, D Moloney 0–1.		J Fitzgibbon 3–1, W Griffin 0–10, P Keane 2–2, PJ Hall 0–2, D Hannon 0–2, D Sheehan 0–2.

5 August 2012 Round 3	Bruree	3–10 – 1–14	Granagh-Ballingarry	FitzGerald Park
	K O'Dea 1–6, M Lane 1–0, C O'Brien 1–0, S Riordan 0–2, G O'Brien 0–1, T O'Brien 0–1.		D O'Connor 0–8, D Condron 1–3, D O'Grady 0–1, N Kenned 0–1, E Chawke 0–1.

== Group 2 ==
=== Group 2 table ===
Knockout stage Relegation stage

Team	Matches				Score			Pts
Team	Pld	W	D	L	For	Against	Diff	Pts
Patrickswell	3	2	1	0	48	41	7	5
Garryspillane	3	1	1	1	59	62	−3	3
Doon	3	1	1	1	42	44	−2	3
Effin	3	0	1	2	54	56	−2	1

=== Group 2 results ===
11 May 2012 Round 1	Garryspillane	1–17 – 2–11	Doon	Fr Hayes Memorial Park
	D Ryan 0–11, D Hayes 1–1, C Hickey 0–3, V Sheehan 0–1, E Corbett 0–1.		M Fitzgerald 1–2, N Maher 1–1, M Barry 0–2, G McParland 0–1, M Ryan 0–1, B Crowe 0–1, M McKenna 0–1, C McNamara 0–1.

12 May 2012 Round 1	Patrickswell	1–14 – 1–13	Effin	Bruree Grounds
	T O'Brien 0–7, K O'Brien 1–1, M Carmody 0–3, S O'Brien 0–1, E Foley 0–1, B Foley 0–1.		D Moloney 1–4, H O'Neill 0–4, D Sheehy 0–2, C Kearney 0–2, S O'Neill 0–1.

1 June 2012 Round 2	Effin	3–17 – 5–11	Garryspillane	Michael Fox Park
	D Moloney 2–5, T Quaid 1–5, C Kearney 0–3, S O'Neill 0–2, H O'Neill 0–1, N Quaid 0–1.		D Ryan 1–9, C Hickey 2–1, D Hayes 2–0, T Harty 0–1.

3 June 2012 Round 2	Doon	0–12 – 0–12	Patrickswell	Bruff Grounds
	M Fitzgerald 0–3, C McNamara 0–3, M Barry 0–2, N Maher 0–2, G McPartland 0–1, M Ryan 0–1.		T O'Brien 0–5, M Carmody 0–2, S O'Brien 0–2, D Byrnes 0–2, E Foley 0–1.

5 August 2012 Round 3	Patrickswell	1–16 – 0–13	Garryspillane	FitzGerald Park
	L Considine 1–4, M Carmody 0–7, K O'Brien 0–2, P Howard 0–1, P O'Reilly 0–1, S O'Brien 0–1.		D Ryan 0–9, C Hickey 0–1, G Power 0–1, K Hickey 0–1, R Sheehan 0–1.

5 August 2012 Round 3	Doon	0–13 – 0–12	Effin	Bruff Grounds
	C McNamara 0–3, M Barry 0–3, N Maher 0–3, R English 0–1, M McKenna 0–1, P Ryan 0–1, D O'Donovan 0–1.		T Quaid 0–7, N Quaid 0–3, H O'Neill 0–1, D Sheehy 0–1.

== Group 3 ==
=== Group 3 table ===
Knockout stage Relegation stage

Team	Matches				Score			Pts
Team	Pld	W	D	L	For	Against	Diff	Pts
Kilmallock	3	2	0	1	73	43	30	4
Ahane	3	2	0	1	53	52	1	4
Murroe/Boher	3	2	0	1	57	67	−10	4
Knockainey	3	0	0	3	38	57	−19	0

=== Group 3 results ===
12 May 2012 Round 1	Kilmallock	2–16 – 0–08	Knockainey	Bruff Grounds
	P O'Dwyer 1–2, K O'Donnell 1–1, E Ryan 0–4, P O'Brien 0–3, S O'Donnell 0–2, J Kelly 0–2, G Mulcahy 0–1, J Mulcahy 0–1.		P Kirby 0–4, B Cleary 0–2, P Barron 0–1, D Walsh 0–1.

12 May 2012 Round 1	Ahane	1–14 – 2–15	Murroe/Boher	Cappamore Grounds
	K Enright 1–0, N Moran 0–3, J Meskell 0–3, R Ryan 0–3, D Laing 0–2, F Ahern 0–2, M Carr 0–1.		S Tobin 2–4, K Tobin 0–3, T O'Brien 0–3, M Ryan 0–3, P Tobin 0–1, D Kett 0–1.

2 June 2012 Round 2	Knockainey	0–09 – 1–10	Ahane	Fr Hayes Memorial Park
	L O'Shea 0–5, P Kirby 0–2, D Walsh 0–1, J Lonergan 0–1.		F Ahern 1–0, M Moran 0–2, R Ryan 0–2, J Meskell 0–2, D Morrissey 0–2, M Carr 0–1, D Laing 0–1.

3 June 2012 Round 2	Murroe/Boher	1–10 – 1–26	Kilmallock	Bruff Grounds
	S Tobin 0–6, M Ryan 1–0, P Tobin 0–2, K Tobin 0–2.		P O'Brien 0–6, E Ryan 0–6, J Mulcahy 0–5, G Mulcahy 1–0, R Egan 0–3, J Kelly 0–2, K O'Donnell 0–2, A O'Shaughnessy 0–1, S O'Donnell 0–1.

4 August 2012 Round 3	Ahane	4–11 – 2–16	Kilmallock	Gaelic Grounds
	D Laing 1–4, M Butler 2–0, R Ryan 1–1, N Moran 0–3, J Meskell 0–2, S Madden 0–1.		E Ryan 0–7, G Mulcahy 1–3, K O'Donnell 1–2, S O'Donnell 0–1, K O'Mahony 0–1, J Mulcahy 0–1, G O'Mahony 0–1.

4 August 2012 Round 3	KNockainey	3–12 – 0–23	Murroe/Boher	Caherelly Grounds
	P Barron 1–3, M Cleary 1–2, B O'Shea 1–0, L O'Shea 0–2, K Cleary 0–2, D Madden 0–1, J Lonergan 0–1, D Walsh 0–1.		S Tobin 0–16, T O'Brien 0–2, K Tobin 0–2, D Dunlea 0–1, P Tobin 0–1, S Hickey 0–1.

== Group 4 ==
=== Group 4 table ===
Knockout stage Relegation stage

Team	Matches				Score			Pts
Team	Pld	W	D	L	For	Against	Diff	Pts
Na Piarsaigh	3	2	1	0	67	40	27	5
Croom	3	1	1	1	55	63	−8	3
South Liberties	3	1	1	1	47	56	−9	3
Hospital-Herbertstown	3	0	1	2	33	43	−10	1

=== Group 4 results ===
11 May 2012 Round 1	Croom	1–12 – 3–06	Hospital-Herbertstown	FitzGerald Park
	T Carmody 0–9, E O'Farrell 1–0, C Allis 0–1, P Reidy 0–1, S Moore 0–1.		B Ryan 2–0, A Murphy 1–0, M Deegan 0–3, J Fitzgerald 0–3.

11 May 2012 Round 1	Na Piarsaigh	2–13 – 1–16	South Liberties	Childers Road
	S Dowling 0–10, A Breen 1–2, D Sheppard 1–0, K Downes 0–1.		M Keane 1–10, S O'Neill 0–1, W Hickey 0–1, B Slattery 0–1, D O'Neill 0–1, T Ryan 0–1, M Keane 0–1.

1 June 2012 Round 2	South Liberties	2–06 – 4–14	Croom	Clarina Grounds
	M Keane 1–5, S O'Neill 1–1.		S Cahill 2–2, T Carmody 0–7, M Cregan 1–0, C Laffan 1–0, C Allis 0–2, S Moore 0–1, P Lalwor 0–1, P Brennan 0–1.

2 June 2012 Round 2	Hospital-Herbertstown	0–07 – 1–09	Na Piarsaigh	Caherelly Grounds
	M Deegan 0–2, P Jones 0–1, J Fitzgerald 0–1, DR O'Sullivan 0–1, M O'Neill 0–1, A Murphy 0–1.		K Ryan 1–1, S Dowling 0–4, A Breen 0–3, D Breen 0–1.

4 August 2012 Round 3	Na Piarsaigh	3–27 – 0–14	Croom	Gaelic Grounds
	S Dowling 1–9, A Breen 1–6, D Breen 1–1, K Ryan 0–3, K Downes 0–3, D Sheppard 0–2, A Hennessy 0–2, E Keogh 0–1.		S Moore 0–3, T Carmody 0–3, M Cregan 0–3, S Cahill 0–2, P Lawlor 0–1, A Morrissey 0–1, C Allis 0–1.

4 August 2012 Round 3	South Liberties	1–13 – 1–08	Hospital-Herbertstown	Childers Road
	M Keane 0–5, M Moynihan 1–0, R O'Neill 0–2, D Clifford 0–2, S Garry 0–1, W Hickey 0–1, B Slattery 0–1, T Ryan 0–1.		M Deegan 1–4, J Fitzgerald 0–2, A Murphy 0–2.

== Relegation stage ==
=== Relegation semi-finals ===
26 August 2012 Semi-final	Hospital-Herbertstown	0–11 – 0–10	Knockainey	Miichael Fox Park

26 August 2012 Semi-final	Effin	2–11 – 1–12	Granagh-Ballingarry	Ballyagran Grounds

=== Relegation final ===
16 September 2012 Final	Knockainey	3–11 – 2–11	Granagh-Ballingarry	FitzGerald Park
	P Kirby 1–8, D O'Brien 1–1, L O'Shea 1–0, B Cleary 0–1, J Lonergan 0–1.		D O'Grady 2–1, D O'Connor 0–7, N Kennedy 0–2, D Condron 0–1.

== Knockout stage ==
=== Quarter-finals ===
25 August 2012 Quarter-final	Kilmallock	1–19 – 0–09	Croom	Bruff Grounds
	G Mulcahy 1–3, J Mulcahy 0–5 (2 frees), E Ryan (2 frees, 1 ‘65’), K O’Donnell, P O’Dwyer 0–3 each, P O’Brien 0–2;	Report	T Carmody 0–4 (4 frees), C Allis (2 ‘65’s), S Moore 0–2 each, E O’Farrell 0–1.

26 August 2012 Quarter-final	Patrickswell	1–11 – 0–15	Adare	Gaelic Grounds
	K O’Brien 1–2, P Howard 0–3, L Considine, M Carmody (2 frees) 0–2 each, P O’Reilly, T O’Brien (1 free) 0–1 each.	Report	W Griffin 0–6 (2 frees), D Hannon 0–5 (1 free), D Sheehan, W McNamara 0–2 each;

26 August 2012 Quarter-final	Na Piarsaigh	5–14 – 0–14	Ahane	Gaelic Grounds
	S Dowling 1–7 (1–5 frees), A Breen 1–3, K Downes 1–2, D Sheppard 1–1 (1 free), D Breen 1–0, S O’Neill 0–1;	Report	J Meskell (4 frees), N Moran (2 frees) 0–4 each, D Laing, S Madden 0–2 each, F Ahern, P Meskell 0–1 each.

26 August 2012 Quarter-final	Emmets	0–16 – 1–14	Garryspillane	FitzGerald Park
	E Walsh 0–5, D Reidy 0–3, D McCarthy 0–2, D Moloney 0–2, M O'Connell 0–1, P O'Leary 0–1, P Leahy 0–1, T Ryan 0–1.	Report	D Ryan 0–6, D Barry 1–0, S Meade 0–2, J Ryan 0–2, D Hayes 0–2, L Power 0–1, K Hickey 0–1.

=== Semi-finals ===
16 September 2012 Semi-final	Kilmallock	4–24 – 4–13	Na Piarsaigh	Gaelic Grounds
	G Mulcahy 3–3, E Ryan 0–8 (5f), K O’Donnell 1–3, S O’Donnell 0–4, P O’Brien, R Egan 0–2 each, P O’Dwyer, J Mulcahy 0–1 each.	Report	S Dowling 1–7 (1-5f, ’65), A Breen 2–3, K Ryan 1–0, K Downes 0–2, D Breen 0–1.

16 September 2012 Semi-final	Adare	1–19 – 0–12	Garryspillane	Gaelic Grounds
	W Griffin 0–8 (3frees), J Fitzgibbon 0–5, D Sheehan 1–0, J Hannon 0–2, A O’Rahilly, A O’Connell, PJ Hall, D Sexton 0–1 each.	Report	D Ryan 0–7 (6frees), J Ryan 0–2, D Barry, G Power, K Hickey 0–1 each.

=== Final ===
7 October 2012 Final	Kilmallock	1–15 – 0–15	Adare	Gaelic Grounds
	J Mulcahy 1–1, P O'Brien, P O'Dwyer, E Ryan (1f) 0–3 each, R Egan 0–2, S O'Donnell, K O'Donnell, K Kennelly, 0–1 each.		D Hannon 0–11 (5f, 2 '65's); D Sheehan (f), J Fitzgibbon, J Hannon, W McNamara 0–1 each.

== Championship statistics ==
=== Top scorers ===
Rank	Player	Club	Tally	Total	Matches	Average
1	Shane Dowling	Na Piarsaigh	3–37	46	5	9.20
2	Donie Ryan	Garryspillane	1–42	45	5	9.00
3	Willie Griffin	Adare	0–37	37	6	6.16
4	Adrian Breen	Na Piarsaigh	5–17	32	5	6.40
4	Seánie Tobin	Murroe/Boher	2–26	32	3	10.66
6	Eoin Ryan	Kilmallock	0–31	31	6	5.16
7	Graeme Mulcahy	Kilmallock	6–10	28	6	4.66
8	Mark Keane	South Liberties	2–20	26	3	8.66
8	Denis O'Connor	Granagh-Ballingarry	2–20	26	3	8.66
10	John Fitzgibbon	Adare	4–13	25	6	4.16
