= 1991 Limerick Senior Hurling Championship =

Annual hurling competition season

- Dates: 21 June – 6 October 1991
- Teams: 16
- Champions: Ballybrown (2nd title); Joe O'Connor (captain); John Loftus (manager)
- Runners-up: Kilmallock; Shane O'Grady (captain); Tony Moloney (manager)

Tournament statistics
- Matches played: 18
- Goals scored: 63 (3.5 per match)
- Points scored: 374 (20.78 per match)
- Top scorer(s): Paddy Kelly (4–35)

The 1991 Limerick Senior Hurling Championship was the 97th staging of the Limerick Senior Hurling Championship since its establishment by the Limerick County Board in 1887. The championship ran from 21 June to 6 October 1991.

Patrickswell were the defending champions, however, they were beaten by Ballybrown in the quarter-finals.

On 6 October 1991, Ballybrown won the championship after a 1–11 to 1–10 defeat of Kilmallock in the final. It was their second championship title overall and their second title in two championship seasons.

Kilmallock's Paddy Kelly was the championship's top scorer with 4–35.

== Results ==
=== First round ===
21 June 1991 First round	Bruff	3–09 – 3–09	Cappamore	Bruff Sportsfield
	M Rea 2–0, J Mulqueen 1–1, T Coleman 0–3, M Reale 0–2, V O'Donovan 0–2, R O'Leary 0–1.		L O'Brien 1–5, P Creamer 2–0, M Hammersley 0–2, M Mulcahy 0–2.

23 June 1991 First round	Emmets	1–15 – 2–11	Hospital-Herbertstown	Bruff Sportsfield
	F Carroll 0–8, P Heffernan 1–1, J Bresnihan 0–2, M Meade 0–2, B Carroll 0–1, M Walsh 0–1.		A Garvey 0–8, M Durkan 1–0, J Moran 1–0, D Carroll 0–1, P Carroll 0–1, PJ Garvey 0–1.

23 June 1991 First round	Patrickswell	2–23 – 0–09	Killeedy	Fr Hayes Memorial Park
	G Kirby 1–7, R Fitzgerald 1–1, D O'Grady 0–4, C Carey 0–4, S Kirby 0–3, N Carey 0–2, L Enright 0–2.		K Kelly 0–5, J Fitzgibbon 0–2, D Flynn 0–1, W Fitzmaurice 0–1.

23 June 1991 First round	Ballybrown	1–13 – 1–11	Western Gaels	FitzGerald Park
	P Davoren 0–8, C Coughlan Snr 1–1, T Hall 0–1, C Coughlan Jnr 0–1, J Mann 0–1, T Kenny 0–1.		S O'Sullivan 0–4, M Larkin 1–0, G Galvin 0–3, M Curtin 0–1, D Woulfe 0–1, S Stapleton 0–1, C Brouder 0–1.

30 June 1991 First round	Kilmallock	3–10 – 2–13	Ahane	Fr Hayes Memorial Park
	P Kelly 2–6, M Leahy 1–0, M Houlihan 0–2, D Clarke 0–1, T Nelligan 0–1.		TJ Keane 1–1, J O'Grady 0–4, G Mulcahy 0–4, J Herbert 1–0, T Burns 0–2, T Murnane 0–1, N Burns 0–1.

30 June 1991 First round	Adare	3–08 – 3–06	City Gaels	FitzGerald Park
	T Howard 1–1, M Alfred 0–4, A Keane 1–0, C Murphy 1–0, B Kennedy 0–3.		P Howard 2–0, G Hegarty 0–5, T Sheehan 1–0, D Quigley 0–1.

30 June 1991 First round	Claughaun	3–13 – 2–07	Feohanagh	FitzGerald Park
	L O'Connor 1–5, M Galligan 0–4, P Loughnane 1–0, D O'Driscoll 1–0, A Moloney 0–1, G Ryan 0–1, V Browne 0–1, M Ryan 0–1.		T Quaid 0–6, P Hough 1–0, P Quaid 1–0, C Phillips 0–1.

30 June 1991 First round	Geraldines	1–10 – 2–04	Doon	Fr Hayes Memorial Park
	M Hickey 0–4, N Nash 1–0, G O'Connell 0–2, M Ryan 0–1, N Godfrey 0–1, M Nash 0–1, N Gammell 0–1.		G McGrath 1–0, B McGrath 1–0, R Walsh 0–3, M Ryan 0–1.

30 June 1991 First round replay	Bruff	2–08 – 0–05	Cappamore	Fr Hayes Memorial Park
	P Barrett 2–3, M Reale 0–3, R O'Leary 0–1, T Coleman 0–1.		L O'Brien 0–2, R Hammersley 0–2, N Sheehan 0–1.

11 August 1991 First round replay	Kilmallock	1–16 – 0–05	Ahane	Gaelic Grounds
	P Kelly 1–8, D Clarke 0–3, M Houlihan 0–2, D Barry 0–1, P Tobin 0–1, P Dowling 0–1.		J O'Grady 0–3, P O'Sullivan 0–1, G Mulcahy 0–1.

=== Quarter-finals ===
11 August 1991 Quarter-final	Claughaun	4–11 – 2–07	Geraldines	Bruff Sportsfield
	L O'Connor 1–5, M Ryan 1–2, A Fitzgerald 1–1, A Moloney 1–0, M Ryan 0–3.		M Ryan 1–1, G O'Connell 0–4, N Gammell 1–0, T Ryan 0–1, L Dooley 0–1.

11 August 1991 Quarter-final	Ballybrown	1–11 – 0–09	Patrickswell	Gaelic Grounds
	P Davoren 0–8, C Coughlan Jnr 1–0, N Doolan 0–1, O O'Connor 0–1, J Mann 0–1.		G Kirby 0–5, C Carey 0–1, A Carmody 0–1, P Foley 0–1, D Punch 0–1.

18 August 1991 Quarter-final	Emmets	2–19 – 0–08	Bruff	FitzGerald Park
	F Carroll 1–10, M Meade 1–0, J Bresnihan 0–3, P McGrath 0–3, E Potter 0–2, P Heffernan 0–1.		T Madden 0–2, P Barrett 0–2, J Moran 0–2, R O'Leary 0–1, M Reale 0–1.

25 August 1991 Quarter-final	Kilmallock	1–10 – 1–06	Adare	Gaelic Grounds
	P Kelly 1–4, M Houlihan 0–3, D Clarke 0–2, P Tobin 0–1.		A Howard 1–3, S Fitzgibbon 0–2, M Alfred 0–1.

=== Semi-finals ===
25 August 1991 Semi-final	Ballybrown	3–09 – 1–15	Claughaun	Gaelic Grounds
	C Coughlan Jnr 2–0, P Davoren 0–6, P Mulqueen 1–0, T Kenny 0–1, T Hall 0–1, S Hayes 0–1.		L O'Connor 0–5, M Galligan 0–4, V Browne 1–0, D Fitzgerald 0–2, M Ryan 0–2, G Ryan 0–1, A Fitzgerald 0–1.

8 September 1991 Semi-final	Kilmallock	1–17 – 1–12	Emmets	Bruff Sportsfield
	P Kelly 0–12, S Barrett 1–0, D Clarke 0–3, M Nelligan 0–1, P Dowling 0–1.		F Carroll 1–6, M Meade 0–2, W Burke 0–1, J Bresnihan 0–1, M Mullane 0–1, D Ryan 0–1.

22 September 1991 Semi-final replay	Ballybrown	5–07 – 4–07	Claughaun	Gaelic Grounds
	P Mulqueen 3–0, O O'Connor 1–1, C Keyes 0–4, C Coughlan Jnr 1–0, T Kenny 0–1, P Davoren 0–1.		L O'Connor 3–1, A Moloney 1–2, P Galligan 0–2, M Galligan 0–1, J Ryan 0–1.

=== Final ===
6 October 1991 Final	Ballybrown	1–11 – 1–10	Kilmallock	Gaelic Grounds, Limerick
	P Davoren 0–7, N Doolan 1–0, C Coughlan Jnr 0–2, T Hall 0–2.		P Kelly 0–5, T Nelligan 1–0, P Tobin 0–2, M Houlihan 0–2, D Clarke 0–1.	Referee: P McNamara (Limerick)

== Championship statistics ==
=== To scorers ===
Overall

Rank	Player	Club	Tally	Total	Matches	Average
1	Paddy Kelly	Kilmallock	4–35	47	5	9.40
2	Leo O'Connor	Claughaun	5–16	31	4	7.75
3	Frankie Carroll	Emmets	2–24	30	3	10.00
3	Pat Davoren	Ballybrown	0–30	30	5	6.00
5	Colm Coughlan Jnr	Ballybrown	4–03	15	5	3.00
5	Gary Kirby	Patrickswell	1–12	15	2	7.50
7	Peter Mulqueen	Ballybrown	4–03	15	5	3.00
8	Pat Barrett	Bruff	2–05	11	3	3.66
9	Tony Howard	Adare	2–04	10	2	5.00
9	Liam O'Brien	Cappamore	1–07	10	2	5.00
9	Dave Clarke	Kilmallock	0–10	10	5	2.00

Single game

Rank	Player	Club	Tally	Total	Opposition
1	Frankie Carroll	Emmets	1–10	13	Bruff
2	Paddy Kelly	Kilmallock	2–06	12	Ahane
3	Paddy Kelly	Kilmallock	1–08	11	Ahane
4	Leo O'Connor	Claughaun	3–01	10	Ballybrown
4	Gary Kirby	Patrickswell	1–07	10	Killeedy
6	Peter Mulqueen	Claughaun	3–00	9	Ballybrown
6	Pat Barrett	Bruff	2–03	9	Cappamore
6	Frankie Carroll	Emmets	1–06	9	Kilmallock
9	Liam O'Brien	Cappamore	1–05	8	Bruff
9	Leo O'Connor	Claughaun	1–05	8	Feohanagh
9	Leo O'Connor	Claughaun	1–05	8	Geraldines
9	Frankie Carroll	Emmets	0–08	8	Hospital-Herbertstown
9	Andy Garvey	Hospital-Herbertstown	0–08	8	Emmets
9	Pat Davoren	Ballybrown	0–08	8	Patrickswell
9	Pat Davoren	Ballybrown	0–08	8	Western Gaels
