= Barry Hennessy =

Limerick hurling goalkeeper

Personal information
- Native name: Barra Ó hAonghusa (Irish)
- Born: 14 October 1989 (age 37) Kilmallock, County Limerick, Ireland
- Occupation: Business Development Manager
- Height: 5 ft 11 in (180 cm)

Sport
- Sport: Hurling
- Position: Goalkeeper
Club
- Years: Club
- Kilmallock
Club titles
- Limerick titles: 4
- Munster titles: 1
- All-Ireland Titles: 0
Inter-county*
Years	County	Apps (scores)
2010–2022	Limerick	2 (0–00)
Inter-county titles
- Munster titles: 4
- All-Irelands: 4
- NHL: 2
- All Stars: 0
- *Inter County team apps and scores correct as of 16:30, 21 July 2022.

Barry Hennessy (born 14 October 1989) is an Irish hurler who plays as a goalkeeper for club side Kilmallock and at senior level for the Limerick county team.

== Playing career ==
=== College ===
Hennessy first came to prominence as a hurler with Ardscoil Rís in Limerick. Having played in every grade, he was in goal on the college's senior team that reached the semi-finals of the Harty Cup for the first time.

=== Club ===
Hennessy joined the Kilmallock club at a young age and played in all grades at juvenile and underage levels, enjoying championship success in the minor and under-21 grades.

On 3 October 2010, Hennessy lined out in his first Limerick Senior Championship final. A 1–16 to 1–12 defeat of divisional side Emmets gave him his first championship medal.

After surrendering their championship crown in 2011, Kilmallock reached the championship decider again on 7 October 2012. Jake Mulcahy scored a vital goal to secure a 1–15 to 0–15 victory over Adare and a second championship medal for Hennessy.

On 19 October 2014, Hennessy won a third championship medal following a 1–15 to 0–14 defeat of reigning champions Na Piarsaigh. He later won a Munster Championship medal following a 1–32 to 3-18 extra-time defeat of Cratloe in the final. On 17 March 2015, Hennessy was in goal for Kilmallock in their 1–18 to 1–06 defeat by Ballyhale Shamrocks in the All-Ireland final at Croke Park.

=== Inter-county ===
==== Minor and under-21 ====
Hennessy first played for the Limerick minor hurling team at the age of seventeen. He made his only appearance in that grade on 23 June 2007 in a 3–21 to 0-12 Munster Championship defeat by Tipperary.

On 15 July 2009, Hennessy made his first appearance with the Limerick under-21 hurling team in a 4–22 to 2–13 defeat by Clare in the Munster Championship. His tenure with the under-21 team ended with a three-point defeat by Clare the following season.

==== Intermediate ====
Hennessy made his first appearance in goal for the Limerick intermediate hurling team in a 1–16 to 0-15 Munster Championship defeat of Clare on 22 June 2008. He later won a Munster Championship medal following a 2–16 to 2–12 victory over Tipperary in the final at Semple Stadium. On 30 August 2008, Hennessy was in goal when Limerick were defeated by six points by Kilkenny in the All-Ireland final.

==== Senior ====
Hennessy made his senior debut in goal for Limerick in a 0–19 to 2–09 defeat by University College Cork in the pre-season Waterford Crystal Cup on 23 January 2010. He made no further appearances that season as Tadhg Flynn became Limerick's first-choice goalkeeper. Hennessy was dropped from the panel the following season.

Hennessy returned to the Limerick senior panel under manager T. J. Ryan for the 2014 season. He was an unused substitute for the entire season. On 24 May 2015, Hennessy made his first Munster Championship appearance in a 1–19 to 2–15 defeat of Clare.

On 19 August 2018, Hennessy was a non-playing substitute when Limerick won their first All-Ireland title in 45 years after a 3–16 to 2–18 defeat of Galway in the final.

On 31 March 2019, Hennessy was named on the bench for Limerick's National League final meeting with Waterford at Croke Park. He collected a winners' medal as a non-playing substitute in the 1–24 to 0–19 victory. On 30 June 2019, Hennessy won a Munster Championship medal as a non-playing substitute following Limerick's 2–26 to 2–14 defeat of Tipperary in the final.

== Personal life ==
Hennessy has spoken about his struggles with an eating disorder.

== Career statistics ==
Team	Year	National League			Munster		All-Ireland		Total	
Team	Year	Division	Apps	Score	Apps	Score	Apps	Score	Apps	Score
Limerick	2010	Division 1	1	0-00	0	0-00	0	0-00	1	0-00
Limerick	2011	Division 2	—		—		—		—	
Limerick	2012	Division 1B	—		—		—		—	
Limerick	2013	Division 1B	—		—		—		—	
Limerick	2014	Division 1B	0	0-00	0	0-00	0	0-00	0	0-00
Limerick	2015	Division 1B	0	0-00	2	0-00	0	0-00	2	0-00
Limerick	2016	Division 1B	1	0-00	0	0-00	0	0-00	1	0-00
Limerick	2017	Division 1B	1	0-00	0	0-00	0	0-00	1	0-00
Limerick	2018	Division 1B	1	0-00	0	0-00	0	0-00	1	0-00
Limerick	2019	Division 1A	1	0-00	0	0-00	0	0-00	1	0-00
Limerick	2020	Division 1A	2	0-00	0	0-00	0	0-00	2	0-00
Limerick	2021	Division 1A	1	0-00	0	0-00	0	0-00	1	0-00
	2022	Division 1A	1	0-00	0	0-00	0	0-00	1	0-00
Career total			9	0-00	2	0-00	0	0-00	11	0-00

== Honours ==
Kilmallock

- Munster Senior Club Hurling Championship: 2014
- Limerick Senior Hurling Championship: 2010, 2012, 2014, 2021
- Limerick Under-21 Hurling Championships: 2007, 2008, 2009
- Limerick Minor Hurling Championships: 2005, 2006

Limerick

- All-Ireland Senior Hurling Championship: 2018, 2020, 2021, 2022
- Munster Senior Hurling Championship: 2019, 2020, 2021, 2022
- National Hurling League: 2019, 2020
- Munster Intermediate Hurling Championship: 2008
