= 2011 Limerick Senior Hurling Championship =

Annual hurling competition season

- Dates: 12 May – 2 October 2011
- Teams: 16
- Sponsor: Limerick's Live 95fm
- Champions: Na Piarsaigh (1st title); Kieran Bermingham (captain); Seán Stack (manager)
- Runners-up: Ahane; Ollie Moran (captain); John Meskell (manager)
- Relegated: Bruff

Tournament statistics
- Matches played: 36
- Goals scored: 73 (2.03 per match)
- Points scored: 858 (23.83 per match)
- Top scorer(s): Shane Dowling (1-31)

The 2011 Limerick Senior Hurling Championship was the 117th staging of the Limerick Senior Hurling Championship since its establishment by the Limerick County Board. The championship ran from 2 May to 2 October 2011.

Kilmallock entered the championship as the defending champions, however, they were beaten by Patrickswell in the quarter-finals.

On 2 October 2011, Na Piarsaigh won the championship after a 2–18 to 0–13 defeat of Ahane in the final. It was their first ever championship title.

Na Piarsaigh's Shane Dowling was the championship's top scorer with 1–31.

== Group A ==
=== Group A table ===
Knockout stage

Team	Matches				Score			Pts
Team	Pld	W	D	L	For	Against	Diff	Pts
Kilmallock	3	3	0	0	70	34	36	6
Hospital–Herbertstown	3	1	0	2	45	50	-5	2
South Liberties	3	1	0	2	35	48	-13	2
Garryspillane	3	1	0	2	44	62	-18	2

=== Group A results ===
12 May 2011 Round 1	Hospital–Herbertstown	0-14 - 1-13	Garryspillane	FitzGerald Park
	J Fitzgerald 0-6, D Reale 0-3, M Deegan 0-2, K O'Connor 0-1, M Fitzgerald 0-1, D Reale 0-1.		Donie Ryan 0-8, J Ryan 0-3, V Sheehan 1-0, G Power 0-2.

13 May 2011 Round 1	Kilmallock	0-16 - 0-07	South Liberties	Bruff Grounds
	E Ryan 0-4, P O'Brien 0-3, S O'Brien 0-3, K O'Donnell 0-2, G Mulcahy 0-2, A O'Shaughnessy 0-1, N Moloney 0-1.		M Keane 0-4, T Ryan 0-1, C O'Neill 0-1, B Gregg 0-1.

17 June 2011 Round 2	Kilmallock	5-15 - 0-14	Garryspillane	Bruff Grounds
	G Mulcahy 2-3, A O'Shaughnessy 1-3, K O'Donnell 1-1, E Ryan 0-4, P Connery 1-0, S O'Donnell 0-2, P O'Brien 0-2.		Donie Ryan 0-6, J Ryan 0-2, D Hayes 0-2, K Hickey 0-1, Davy Ryan 0-1, M O'Donnell 0-1, G Power 0-1.

18 June 2011 Round 2	South Liberties	0-10 - 1-15	Hospital–Herbertstown	FitzGerald Park
	M Keane 0-7, J Butler 0-1, M Ryan 0-1, D O'Neill 0-1.		J Fitzgerald 0-4, C Wallace 1-1, K O'Loughlin 0-3, M Deegan 0-2, K O'Donoghue 0-2, J Fogarty 0-1, D Reale 0-1, K O'Connor 0-1.

6 August 2011 Round 3	Kilmallock	3-15 - 2-07	Hospital–Herbertstown	Bruff Grounds
	K O'Donnell 1-4, C MOloney 1-2, S O'Donnell 1-1, P O'Brien 0-2, G O'Mahony 0-1, B O'Sullivan 0-1, E Ryan 0-1, A O'Shaughnessy 0-1, P Connery 0-1, N McInerney 0-1.		J Fitzgerald 0-5, K O'Loughin 1-0, B Ryan 1-0, M Deegan 0-1, C Wallace 0-1.

6 August 2011 Round 3	South Liberties	2-12 - 2-08	Garryspillane	Childers Road
	M Keane 0-5, D O'Neill 1-1, W Hickey 1-0, S O'Neill 0-2, T Ryan 0-2, M Keane 0-1, D Grimes 0-1.		C Hickey 1-1, Donie Ryan 0-4, L Power 1-0, Davy Ryan 0-2, D Hayes 0-1.

== Group B ==
=== Group B table ===
Knockout stage

Team	Matches				Score			Pts
Team	Pld	W	D	L	For	Against	Diff	Pts
Emmets	3	3	0	0	57	41	16	6
Patrickswell	3	2	0	1	59	62	-3	4
Bruff	3	1	0	2	56	56	0	2
Granagh–Ballingarry	3	0	0	3	32	45	-13	0

=== Group B results ===
13 May 2011 Round 1	Bruff	3-15 - 4-14	Patrickswell	Childers Road
	P O'Leary 2-1, S Bulfin 0-7, T Burke 1-2, J Hayes 0-2, P Browne 0-1.		E Foley 2-2, B Foley 0-5, S O'Brien 1-1, M Carmody 0-3, P Harty 1-0, L Considine 0-2, P O'Neill 0-1.

15 May 2011 Round 1	Emmets	0-12 - 0-09	Granagh–Ballingarry	Ballyagran Grounds
	R McCarthy 0-5, E Walsh 0-2, S Walsh 0-1, N Quaid 0-1, T Crawford 0-1, D Moloney 0-1, T Ryan 0-1.		D O'Connor 0-6, D Clancy 0-1, P Carroll 0-1, M Clancy 0-1.

18 June 2011 Round 2	Granagh–Ballingarry	1-10 - 2-12	Bruff	Ballyagran Grounds
	P Kennedy 0-4, E Kennedy 1-0, M Clancy 0-2, C Hogan 0-2, D O'Grady 0-2.		P O'Leary 2-3, S Bulfin 0-6, P Browne 0-1, M O'Hara 0-1, C Madden 0-1.

19 June 2011 Round 2	Patrickswell	2-12 - 1-25	Emmets	Ballingarry Grounds
	M Carmody 1-2, E Foley 1-0, S O'Brien 0-3, B Geoghegan 0-2, T O'Brien 0-2, B Foley 0-1, P Harty 0-1, L Considine 0-1.		P Neenan 0-7, P Leahy 1-4, E Walsh 0-4, D Moloney 0-3, N Quaid 0-3, D McCarthy 0-2, E O'Leary 0-1, S Walsh 0-1.

7 August 2011 Round 3	Patrickswell	0-15 - 0-10	Granagh–Ballingarry	FitzGerald Park
	M Carmody 0-6, T O'Brien 0-4, B Geoghegan 0-2, S O'Brien 0-1, L Considine 0-1, E Kelly 0-1.		D O'Connor 0-9, N Kennedy 0-1.

7 August 2011 Round 3	Emmets	1-14 - 0-14	Bruff	Ballyagran Grounds
	S Walsh 0-4, P Neenan 0-3, D McCarthy 1-0, P Leahy 0-2, N Quaid 0-2, E O'Leary 0-1, P Ryan 0-1, D Moloney 0-1.		S Bulfin 0-9, T Burke 0-2, P Browne 0-1, C McEniry 0-1, J Moloney 0-1.

== Group C ==
=== Group C table ===
Knockout stage

Team	Matches				Score			Pts
Team	Pld	W	D	L	For	Against	Diff	Pts
Adare	3	2	1	0	64	36	28	5
Na Piarsaigh	3	2	1	0	55	45	10	5
Croom	3	1	0	2	43	62	-19	2
Bruree	3	0	0	3	34	53	-19	0

=== Group C results ===
13 May 2011 Round 1	Bruree	0-08 - 1-14	Adare	Mungret Grounds
	T O'Brien 0-3, G O'Dea 0-2, JV O'Brien 0-2, M Lane 0-1.		D Hannon 1-4, J Fitzgibbon 0-3, D Sexton 0-2, M Noonan 0-1, C Fitzgerald 0-1, M Foley 0-1, W Griffin 0-1, N Mulvihill 0-1.

14 May 2011 Round 1	Na Piarsaigh	1-15 - 0-16	Croom	Mick Neville Park
	K Downes 0-6, D Breen 0-5, A Breen 1-0, K Bermingham 0-2, A Dempsey 0-1, K Ryan 0-1.		T Carmody 0-7, C Alliss 0-5, E O'Farrell 0-2, S Cahill 0-1, D Sexton 0-1.

18 June 2011 Round 2	Na Piarsaigh	0-16 - 2-10	Adare	Fitzerald Park
	A Dempsey 0-3, D Breen 0-3, S Dowling 0-2, R Sheehan 0-2, K Ryan 0-2, K Downes 0-2, S O'Neill 0-1, A Breen 0-1.		B Foley 2-0, D Hannon 0-3, W McNamara 0-2, C Fitzgerald 0-2, D Sexton 0-2, D Sheehan 0-1.

19 June 2011 Round 2	Croom	1-12 - 0-13	Bruree	Bruff Grounds
	C Allis 1-9, M Cregan 0-2, P Lawlor 0-1.		G O'Dea 0-3, JV O'Brien 0-2, J O'Dea 0-2, M Lane 0-2, S O'Halloran 0-2, JC O'Brien 0-1, G O'Brien 0-1.

5 August 2011 Round 3	Adare	4-19 - 1-09	Croom	Páirc an Chrócaigh
	J Fitzgibbon 4-2, D Hannon 0-7, W Griffin 0-3, C Fitzgerald 0-2, D Sexton 0-2, D Sheehan 0-2, P Keane 0-1.		T Carmody 0-7, M Cregan 1-1, S Cahill 0-1.

5 August 2011 Round 3	Na Piarsaigh	3-12 - 0-13	Bruree	Clarina Grounds
	S Dowling 0-5, K Ryan 1-2, D Breen 1-1, S O'Neill 1-0, R Sheehan 0-2, K Downes 0-1, K Bermingham 0-1.		P Kelly 0-3, G O'Dea 0-3, S O'Halloran 0-1, G O'Brien 0-1, D Lenihan 0-1, M Lane 0-1, JV O'Brien 0-1, J O'Dea 0-1, K O'Dea 0-1.

== Group D ==
=== Group D table ===
Knockout stage

Team	Matches				Score			Pts
Team	Pld	W	D	L	For	Against	Diff	Pts
Doon	3	3	0	0	52	39	13	6
Ahane	3	1	1	1	44	40	4	3
Murroe/Boher	3	1	1	1	52	54	-2	3
Knockainey	3	0	0	3	40	55	-15	0

=== Group D results ===
14 May 2011 Round 1	Knockainey	1-11 - 1-18	Murroe/Boher	Childers Road
				Referee: B Stack (Newcastle West)

14 May 2011 Round 1	Doon	1-09 - 0-10	Ahane	Fr Hayes Memorial Park
	N Maher 0-5, M Ryan 1-1, G McPartland 0-1, E Fitzgibbon 0-1, D Stapleton 0-1.		J Meskell 0-6, P O'Connor 0-2, O Moran 0-1, N Moran 0-1.

17 June 2011 Round 2	Ahane	1-15 - 1-09	Knockainey	Childers Road
	N Moran 0-8, R Ryan 1-0, O Moran 0-3, S Madden 0-3, F Ahern 0-1.		P Kirby 0-4, M Cleary 1-0, B O'Shea 0-2, D Walsh 0-1, B Cleary 0-1, L O'Shea 0-1.

19 June 2011 Round 2	Murroe/Boher	1-12 - 3-15	Doon	Fr Hayes Memorial Park
	S Tobin 0-6, P Tobin 1-2, K Tobin 0-3, M Ryan 0-1.		N Maher 2-3, M Ryan 0-8, M Barry 1-2, D Stapleton 0-1, D Moloney 0-1.

6 August 2011 Round 3	Ahane	1-13 - 1-13	Murroe/Boher	Fr Hayes Memorial Park
	O Moran 0-5, J Meskell 0-4, N Moran 1-0, S O'Connoor 0-2, S Madden 0-1, D Morrissey 0-1.		P McNamara 0-5, S Tobin 0-4, M Ryan 1-1, P Tobin 0-1, K Tobin 0-1, J Butler 0-1.

6 August 2011 Round 3	Doon	0-16 - 1-11	Knockainey	Childers Road
	M Ryan 0-9, M McKenna 0-4, M Barry 0-1, J Ryan 0-1, C McNamara 0-1.		P Kirby 1-4, D Madden 0-4, M Cleary 0-2, C Madden 0-1.

== Relegation stage ==
=== Relegation semi-finals ===
10 September 2011 Semi-final	Bruff	1-06 - 2-06	Bruree	FitzGerald Park

11 September 2011 Semi-final	Granagh–Ballingarry	1-08 - 1-08	Knockainey	FitzGerald Park

18 September 2011 Semi-final relegation	Granagh–Ballingarry	1-11 - 0-11	Knockainey	FitzGerald Park

=== Relegation final ===
24 September 2011 Final	Bruff	1-06 - 1-08	Knockainey	FitzGerald Park
	S Bulfin 1-3, P Browne 0-2, N O'Riordan 0-1.		P Kirby 1-2, M Cleary 0-2, S Lonergan 0-1, D O'Brien 0-1, L O'Shea 0-1, K Cleary 0-1.

== Knockout stage ==
=== Quarter-finals ===
27 August 2011 Quarter-final	Ahane	2–16 – 0–18	Adare	Gaelic Grounds
	N Moran 0-6, J Meskell 0-5, O Moran 1-2, S Madden 1-0, D Morrissey 0-2, R Ryan 0-1.	Report	W Griffin 0-5, D Hannon 0-3, D Sheehan 0-2, C Fitzgerald 0-2, A O'Rahilly 0-1, P Keane 0-1, D Sexton 0-1, J Fitzgibbon 0-1, B Foley 0-1, W McNamara 0-1.

28 August 2011 Quarter-final	Patrickswell	1–15 – 0–17	Kilmallock	Bruff Grounds
	M Carmody 0-7, T O'Brien 1-1, L Considine 0-2, B Geoghegan 0-2, S O'Brien 0-2, B Foley 0-1.	Report	E Ryan 0-4, P O'Brien 0-3, A O'Shughnessy 0-3, G Mulcahy 0-3, P O'Dwyer 0-2, K O'Donnell 0-1, J Mulcahy 0-1.

28 August 2011 Quarter-final	Na Piarsaigh	4–14 – 0–16	Doon	FitzGerald Park
	D Breen 1-5, S O'Neill 2-0, S Dowling 0-6, K Kennedy 1-1, P Gleeson 0-1, R Sheehan 0-1.	Report	M Ryan 0-8, N Maher 0-5, J Ryan 0-1, D Stapleton 0-1, M Barry 0-1.

28 August 2011 Quarter-final	Emmets	1–23 – 1–14	Hospital-Herbertstwon	FitzGerald Park
	E Walsh 1-5, P Neenan 0-6, D McCarthy 0-6, S Walsh 0-2, P Leahy 0-2, N Quaid 0-1, D Molooney 0-1.	Report	M Deegan 0-10, D Reale 1-0, R O'Donovan 0-1, A Murphy 0-1, B O'Donoghue 0-1, K O'Loughlin 0-1.

=== Semi-finals ===
11 September 2011 Semi-final	Ahane	1–10 – 2–07	Emmets	Gaelic Grounds
	B Healy 1-2, O Moran 0-4, J Meskell 0-3, D Morrissey 0-1.	Report	P Neenan 0-4, D McCarthy 1-1, E Walsh 1-0, P Leahy 0-1, M Keane 0-1.

11 September 2011 Semi-final	Na Piarsaigh	0–20 – 0–15	Patrickswell	Gaelic Grounds
	S Dowling 0–8 (6fs, 2 65s), K Downes 0–5, K Ryan 0–3, C King 0–2, S O’Neill, D Breen 0–1 each.	Report	M Carmody (f), S O’Brien 0–3 each, B Murray (0-2fs), T O’Brien (1f), L Considine 0–2 each, P O’Grady, B Foley, E Foley 0–1 each.

18 September 2011 Semi-final replay	Ahane	3–13 – 1–12	Emmets	Gaelic Grounds
	N Moran 2-2, O Moran 1-2, J Meskell 0-3, D Laing 0-2, R Ryan 0-2, S O'Connor 0-1, S Madden 0-1.	Report	E O'Leary 1-1, P Neenan 0-4, M O'Brien 0-1, P Ryan 0-1, B Kelleher 0-1, E Walsh 0-1, S Walsh 0-1, D McCarthy 0-1, P Leahy 0-1.

=== Final ===
2 October 2011 Final	Na Piarsaigh	2–18 – 0–13	Ahane	Gaelic Grounds
	S Dowling 1–10 (1–0 pen, 7f), K Downes 1–1, P Gleeson, D Breen, A Breen all 0–2 each, S O'Neill 0–1.		N Moran 0–5 (3f), S Madden, J Meskell(1f) 0–2 each, D Morrissey, O Moran, P O'Connor, F Ahern all 0–1 each.

== Championship statistics ==
=== Miscellaneous ===
- Na Piarsaigh win their first senior title.
