= 1994 Limerick Senior Hurling Championship =

Annual hurling competition season

- Dates: 17 June – 23 October 1994
- Teams: 16
- Champions: Kilmallock (8th title); Mike Houlihan (captain); Neil Ronan (manager)
- Runners-up: Bruree; Peter Finn (captain); Hugh Hogan (manager)
- Relegated: Hospital-Herbertstown

Tournament statistics
- Matches played: 45
- Goals scored: 139 (3.09 per match)
- Points scored: 951 (21.13 per match)
- Top scorer(s): Séamus O'Connell (2–55)

The 1994 Limerick Senior Hurling Championship was the 100th staging of the Limerick Senior Hurling Championship since its establishment by the Limerick County Board in 1887. The championship ran from 17 June to 23 October 1994.

Patrickswell entered the championship as the defending champions, however, they were beaten by Kilmallock in the quarter-finals. Hospital-Herbertstown were relegated.

The final, a replay, was played on 23 October 1994 at the Gaelic Grounds in Limerick, between Kilmallock and Bruree, in what was their first ever meeting in the final. Kilmallock won the match by 1–12 to 0–12 to claim their eighth championship title overall and a first title in two years.

Bruree's Séamus O'Connell was the championship's top scorer with 2–55.

== Format change ==
Proposals by a review committee in relation to the structure of the championship were adopted by the Limerick County Board. These proposals introduced a group stage phase, guaranteeing each team three games, before progressing to a knockout phase. The new championship structure was confined to club teams. This meant that the three divisional sides – Emmets, Geraldines and Western Gaels – did not field teams.

== Team changes ==
=== To Championship ===
Promoted from the Limerick Intermediate Hurling Championship

- Blackrock

== Group 1 ==
=== Group 1 table ===
Knockout stage Relegation stage

Team	Matches				Score			Pts
Team	Pld	W	D	L	For	Against	Diff	Pts
Adare	3	3	0	0	57	37	20	6
Patrickswell	3	2	0	1	63	41	18	4
Killeedy	3	1	0	2	42	59	−17	2
Hospital-Herbertstown	3	0	0	3	41	66	−25	2

=== Group 1 results ===
24 June 1994 Round 1	Adare	3–08 – 2–09	Patrickswell	Bruff Grounds
	S Fitzgibon 1–3, T Houlihan 1–1, A Howard 0–4, N Foley 1–0.		G Kirby 0–6, D O'Grady 1–1, B Cauley 1–0, C Carey 0–1, B Foley 0–1.

26 June 1994 Round 1	Hospital-Herbertstown	3–08 – 1–17	Killeedy	Ballyagran Grounds
	A Garvey 1–2, P Lynch 1–0, D Carroll 1–0, PJ Garvey 0–2, L Garvey 0–2, J Carroll 0–1, J O'Shea 0–1.		K Kelly 0–10, J Magner 0–4, D Flynn 0–2, T Magner 0–1.

17 July 1994 Round 2	Patrickswell	1–19 – 2–06	Hospital-Herbertstown	FitzGerald Park
	G Kirby 1–9, N Carey 0–3, S Carey 0–2, B Foley 0–2, D O'Grady 0–1, R Fitzgerald 0–1, S Kirby 0–1.		L Garvey 1–2, A Garvey 0–4, P O'Connell 1–0.

17 July 1994 Round 2	Killeedy	1–07 – 1–13	Adare	Ballingarry Grounds
	K Kelly 0–6, G Forde 1–0, T Magner 0–1.		T Houlihan 1–3, M Foley 0–4, A Howard 0–2, B Heffernan 0–2, S Fitzgibbon 0–1, J Foley 0–1.

24 July 1994 Round 3	Adare	4–12 – 3–03	Hospital-Herbertstown	FitzGerald Park
	T Dunne 2–1, M Foley 1–2, S Fitzgibbon 0–4, B Heffernan 1–0, T Murphy 0–2, J Foley 0–1, T Howard 0–1, T Houlihan 0–1.		PJ Garvey 2–0, A Garvey 1–3.

24 July 1994 Round 3	Patrickswell	4–14 – 3–03	Killeedy	Bruff Grounds
	G Kirby 1–7, B Foley 2–0, A Carmody 1–1, A Purcell 0–2, R Fitzgerald 0–2, D O'Grady 0–2.		T Magner 1–1, J Hayes 1–0, R Hayes 1–0, J Kelleher 0–1, D Flynn 0–1.

== Group 2 ==
=== Group 2 table ===
Knockout stage Relegation stage

Team	Matches				Score			Pts
Team	Pld	W	D	L	For	Against	Diff	Pts
Kilmallock	3	3	0	0	80	33	47	6
Ahane	3	1	0	2	36	51	−15	2
Cappamore	3	1	0	2	39	68	−29	2
Doon	3	1	0	2	45	48	−3	2

=== Group 2 results ===
17 June 1994 Round 1	Doon	1–15 – 1–06	Cappamore	Fr Hayes Memorial Park
	G McGrath 0–4, J O'Donovan 0–4, D Ryan 1–0, T Hayes 0–3, M Nolan 0–2, L Ryan 0–1, N Maher 0–1.		L Hammersley 1–2, P Gleeson 0–2, G Sheehan 0–1, D O'Donnell 0–1.

24 June 1994 Round 1	Ahane	0–07 – 3–11	Kilmallock	Gaelic Grounds
	T Herbert 0–2, G Mulcahy 0–2, J Moran 0–1, J Brady 0–1, A Smith 0–1.		L Neenan 2–1, P Tobin 1–3, P Kelly 0–5, P Barrett 0–1, D Clarke 0–1.

16 July 1994 Round 2	Kilmallock	3–18 – 3–07	Doon	Gaelic Grounds
	P Kelly 1–8, L Neenan 0–5, P Tobin 1–1, B Hanley 1–0, D Clarke 0–2, M Houlihan 0–2.		M Ryan 1–1, L Ryan 1–0, J O'Dwyer 1–0, J O'Donovan 0–2, G McGrath 0–1, K McGrath 0–1, V McGrath 0–1, P Coleman 0–1.

17 July 1994 Round 2	Cappamore	3–11 – 1–14	Ahane	Fr Hayes Mmeorial Park
	L Hammersley 0–7, S O'Dwyer 2–0, M Gleeson 1–1, T Mulcahy 0–2, P Gleeson 0–1.		C Smith 1–3, T Herbert 0–5, O Moran 0–2, J O'Grady 0–1, G Mulcahy 0–1, J Moran 0–1.

24 July 1994 Round 3	Doon	1–08 – 1–09	Ahane	Cappamore Grounds
	J O'Donovan 1–2, L Ryan 0–1, M Ryan 0–1, V McGrath 0–1, P Coleman 0–1, M Nolan 0–1, B McLoughlin 0–1.		C Smith 1–2, J O'Grady 0–2, TJ Collins 0–1, G Mulcahy 0–1, P Smith 0–1, O Hurley 0–1.

24 July 1994 Round 3	Cappamore	1–07 – 5–18	Kilmallock	Gaelic Grounds
	G Sheehan 1–0, T Mulcahy 0–3, D O'Donnell 0–2, M Gleeson 0–1, P Gleeson 0–1.		P Kelly 1–8, L Neenan 2–4, P Tobin 1–2, B Hanley 1–0, M Nelligan 0–3, M Houlihan 0–1.

=== Group 2 playoffs ===
31 July 1994 Playoff	Ahane	0–16 – 1–10	Doon	Cappamore Grounds
	M Fitzgerald 0–3, G Mulcahy 0–3, J O'Grady 0–3, J Moran 0–2, M Hurley 0–2, G Murphy 0–2, TJ Collins 0–1.		J O'Donovan 1–5, J McGrath 0–2, L Ryan 0–1, M Hayes 0–1, M Nolan 0–1.

9 August 1994 Playoff	Cappamore	2–12 – 1–17 (aet)	Ahane	Fr Hayes Memorial Park
	T Mulcahy 1–6, M Gleeson 1–0, S Ryan 0–2, G Sheehan 0–1, P Gleeson 0–1, P Creamer 0–1.		C Smith 1–3, J O'Grady 0–4, G Mulcahy 0–4, M Fitzgerald 0–2, D O'Neill 0–2, G Murphy 0–1, J Moran 0–1.

== Group 3 ==
=== Group 3 table ===
Knockout stage Relegation stage

Team	Matches				Score			Pts
Team	Pld	W	D	L	For	Against	Diff	Pts
Bruree	3	2	0	1	50	37	13	4
Claughaun	3	2	0	1	48	44	4	4
Bruff	3	2	0	1	43	46	−3	4
Ballybrown	3	0	0	3	35	49	−14	0

=== Group 3 results ===
24 June 1994 Round 1	Bruff	2–09 – 0–12	Bruree	FitzGerald Park
	JA Moran 0–6, J Wallace 1–0, J Sheehan 1–0, P Moloney 0–1, J Hogan 0–1, A Madden 0–1.		S O'Connell 0–5, P Cullinane 0–3, E Potter 0–3, M Mullane 0–1.

24 June 1994 Round 1	Claughaun	2–11 – 0–10	Ballybrown	Gaelic Grounds
	M Galligan 0–6, A Browne 1–1, G Ryan 1–0, D Mulcahy 0–2, T Fitzgerald 0–1, L O'Connor 0–1.		C Keyes 0–6, T Kenny 0–1, C Coughlan Jnr 0–1, J Roche 0–1, P Mulqueen 0–1.

17 July 1994 Round 2	Bruree	1–17 – 1–07	Claughaun	Bruff Grounds
	S O'Connell 1–10, E Potter 0–2, S McDonagh 0–2, P Cullinane 0–1, M Sexton 0–1, M Mullane 0–1.		M Galligan 0–4, L O'Connor 1–0, V Reddy 0–1, G Ryan 0–1, A Fitzgerald 0–1.

17 July 1994 Round 2	Ballybrown	1–10 – 2–08	Bruff	FitzGerald Park
	C Keyes 1–5, J O'Connor 0–1, N Doolin 0–1, T Hall 0–1, P Mulqueen 0–1, C Coughlan Jnr 0–1.		JA Moran 1–6, T Coleman 1–0, B Finn 0–1, J Hogan 0–1.

24 July 1994 Round 3	Bruff	1–11 – 2–15	Claughaun	FitzGerald Park
	JA Moran 1–6, M Reale 0–4, J Hogan 0–1.		M Galligan 0–7, L O'Connor 1–3, D Mulcahy 1–0, M Molyneaux 0–2, I O'Brien 0–1, V Reddy 0–1, G Ryan 0–1.

24 July 1994 Round 3	Bruree	1–15 – 0–12	Ballybrown	Bruff Grounds
	S McDonagh 0–4, S O'Connell 0–4, E Potter 1–0, P Cullinane 0–3, M Mullane 0–2, S Murphy 0–1, P Potter 0–1.		C Keyes 0–8, O O'Connor 0–2, P Davoren 0–1, S Hayes 0–1.

=== Group 3 playoffs ===
11 September 1994 Playoff	Bruree	0–13 – 1–07	Bruff	FitzGerald Park
	S O'Connell 0–7, E Potter 0–3, P Cullinane 0–1, A O'Shea 0–1, M Sexton 0–1.		JA Moran 1–4, B Finn 0–1, P Moloney 0–1, R O'Leary 0–1.

18 September 1994 Playoff	Claughaun	1–10 – 0–08	Bruff	Fr Hayes Memorial Park
	I O'Brien 1–0, M Galligan 0–2, A Fitzgerald 0–2, M Molyneaux 0–2, P Burke 0–1, D Mulcahy 0–1, G Ryan 0–1.		JA Moran 0–4, B Finn 0–2, P Moloney 0–1, A Madden 0–1.

== Group 4 ==
=== Group 4 table ===
Knockout stage Relegation stage

Team	Matches				Score			Pts
Team	Pld	W	D	L	For	Against	Diff	Pts
Feohanagh	3	3	0	0	61	39	22	6
South Liberties	3	1	1	1	43	42	1	3
Old Christians	3	1	0	2	43	45	−2	2
Blackrock	3	0	1	2	34	55	−21	1

=== Group 4 results ===
24 June 1994 Round 1	South Liberties	1–08 – 1–08	Blackrock	Kilteely Grounds
	G Nash 1–1, P Fenn 0–4, N Nash 0–1, D Godfrey 0–1, J Enright 0–1.		P McCarthy 1–2, P Heffernan 0–4, A Roche 0–1, D Lee 0–1.

26 June 1994 Round 1	Old Christians	0–09 – 4–08	Feohanagh	FitzGerald Park
	G Hegarty 0–4, A Maher 0–2, P Butler 0–2, T Sheehan 0–1.	P Finn	P Quaid 2–1, J Greaney 1–1, C Philips 0–4, P Hough 1–0, J Qauid 0–1, S Roche 0–1.

16 July 1994 Round 2	Feohanagh	3–06 – 1–10	South Liberties	Bruff Grounds
	P Quaid 1–2, C Philips 1–0, S O'Keeffe 1–0, T Quaid 0–3, J Greaney 0–1.		M Nash 0–5, L Dooley 1–0, P Finn 0–2, N Nash 0–1, N Godfrey 0–1, S Godfrey 0–1.

17 July 1994 Round 2	Blackrock	0–06 – 3–09	Old Christians	Fr Hayes Memorial Park
	P McGrath 0–5, A Fitzgerald 0–1.		M Timmons 1–3, P Howard 1–2, P Butler 1–2, G Hegarty 0–1, D Costello 0–1.

24 July 1994 Round 3	Old Christians	0–16 – 3–10	South Liberties	Bruff Grounds
	P Howard 0–5, J Brosnahan 0–4, P Butler 0–3, G Hegarty 0–2, M Timmons 0–1, A Maher 0–1.		N Nash 3–1, M Nash 0–5, L Dooley 0–2, B Finn 0–1, D Nash 0–1.

24 July 1994 Round 3	Feohanagh	3–17 – 3–08	Blackrock	Ballyagran Grounds
	P Quaid 2–2, J Greaney 0–5, J Madigan 1–1, T Quaid 0–4, S O'Keeffe 0–3, M Sweeney 0–1, S Roche 0–1.		P O'Dea 1–2, J O'Neill 1–0, D Lee 1–0, T Quilty 0–2, T Coughlan 0–2, P McGrath 0–2.

== Relegation stage ==
=== Relegation quarter-finals ===
14 August 1994 Quarter-final	Cappamore	2–11 – 0–07	Hospital-Herbertstown	Fr Hayes Memorial Park

25 September 1994 Quarter-final	Doon	1–11 – 3–07	Killeedy	Bruff Grounds

25 September 1994 Quarter-final	Ballybrown	3–14 – 2–07	Old Christians	Gaelic Grounds

25 September 1994 Quarter-final	Bruff	1–14 – 1–09	Blackrock	FitzGerald Park
	T Colman 1–3, J Hogan 0–4, A Moran 0–4, S Fitzgerald 0–1, M Reale 0–1, J Wallace 0–1.		P Heffernan 1–3, E O'Sullivan 0–2, A Fitzgerald 0–2, J O'Neill 0–1, J Quilty 0–1.

=== Relegation semi-finals ===
2 October 1994 Semi-final	Old Christians	w/o – scr.	Hospital-Herbertstown	Fr Hayes Memorial Park

9 October 1994 Semi-final	Blackrock	2–10 – 1–13	Doon	Fr Hayes Memorial Park
			P Coleman 0–5, K McGrath 1–1, V McGrath 0–3, I Ryan 0–2, G McGrath 0–2.

15 October 1994 Semi-final replay	Blackrock	3–12 – 3–09 (aet)	Doon	Fr Hayes Memorial Park

=== Relegation final ===
6 November 1994 Final	Doon	4–09 – 1–09	Hospital-Herbertstown	Gaelic Grounds

== Knockout stage ==
=== Quarter-finals ===
11 September 1994 Quarter-final	Adare	1–13 – 1–14	Ahane	FitzGerald Park
	S Fitzgibbon 0–7, A Howard 1–1, M Foley 0–2, B Heffernan 0–1, C Murphy 0–1, B Kennedy 0–1.		G Mulcahy 1–4, T Herbert 0–4, J O'Grady 0–2, J Moran 0–2, TJ Collins 0–1, C Smith 0–1.

18 September 1994 Quarter-final	South Liberties	1–08 – 1–09	Bruree	FitzGerald Park
	S Ryan 1–0, M Nash 0–3, K McAuliffe 0–3, N Nash 0–1, J Nash 0–1.		M Mullane 1–0, S McDonagh 0–3, P Mullane 0–3, S O'Connell 0–2, P Sexton 0–1.

25 September 1994 Quarter-final	Feohanagh	0–10 – 1–09	Claughaun	Gaelic Grounds
	T Quaid 0–6, M Sweeney 0–2, S O'Keeffe 0–1, S Roche 0–1.		A Fitzgerald 1–1, L O'Connor 0–4, M Ryan 0–2, M Galligan 0–1, P Burke 0–1.

25 September 1994 Quarter-final	Kilmallock	2–11 – 0–15	Patrickswell	Gaelic Grounds
	P Kelly 2–2, L Neenan 0–2, P Barrett 0–2, D Clarke 0–1, M Houlihan 0–1, M Nelligan 0–1, P Tobin 0–1, B Hanley 0–1.		G Kirby 0–7, A Carmody 0–2, D O'Grady 0–2, A Purcell 0–2, S Kirby 0–2.

=== Semi-finals ===
2 October 1994 Semi-final	Bruree	0–11 – 0–11	Ahane	Gaelic Grounds
	S O'Connell 0–8, S McDonagh 0–2, A O'Shea 0–1.		T Herbert 0–4, M Fitzgerald 0–3, J Moran 0–1, D Harrison 0–1, J O'Grady 0–1, C Smith 0–1.

2 October 1994 Semi-final	Kilmallock	1–09 – 1–09	Claughaun	Gaelic Grounds
	L Neenan 1–1, P Barrett 0–3, P Kelly 0–2, D Clarke 0–1, M Nelligan 0–1, P Tobin 0–1.		V Reddy 1–0, M Ryan 0–2, M Galligan 0–2, L O'Connor 0–2, G Ryan 0–2, D Mulcahy 0–1.

9 October 1994 Semi-final replay	Bruree	2–13 – 1–09	Ahane	Gaelic Grounds
	S O'Connell 0–7, M Sexton 1–1, M Mullane 1–0, D McCarthy 0–1, S McDonagh 0–1, P Cullinane 0–1, A O'Shea 0–1, E Potter 0–1.		G Mulcahy 0–5, M Fitzgerald 1–0, J Moran 0–1, C Smith 0–1, D O'Neill 0–1, J O'Grady 0–1.

9 October 1994 Semi-final replay	Kilmallock	2–12 – 1–10	Claughaun	Gaelic Grounds
	P Kelly 0–8, M Houlihan 1–2, L Neenan 1–0, P Barrett 0–1, P Tobin 0–1.		M Galligan 0–6, L O'Connor 1–1, A Fitzgerald 0–2, M Ryan 0–1.

=== Final ===
16 October 1994 Final	Kilmallock	1–12 – 1–12	Bruree	Gaelic Grounds
	P Kelly 0–5, P Dowling 0–4, P Tobin 1–0, D Clarke 0–1, P Barrett 0–1, L Neenan 0–1.		S O'Connell 0–7, M Mullane 1–1, A O'Shea 0–2, P Cullinane 0–1, E Potter 0–1.	Referee: T Murray (Patrickswell)

=== Final replay ===
23 October 1994 Final replay	Kilmallock	2–09 – 1–08	Bruree	Gaelic Grounds
	L Neenan 1–1, P Tobin 1–1, P Barrett 0–3, P Dowling 0–2, P Kelly 0–1, M Houlihan 0–1.		S O'Connell 1–5, E Potter 0–2, M Sexton 0–1	Referee: T Murray (Patrickswell)

== Championship statistics ==
=== Top scorers ===
Rank	Player	Club	Tally	Total	Matches	Average
1	Séamus O'Connell	Bruree	2–55	61	9	6.77
2	Paddy Kelly	Kilmallock	4–39	51	8	6.37
3	Liam Neenan	Kilmallock	7–15	36	8	4.50
4	John Anthony Moran	Bruff	3–26	35	5	7.00
4	Gary Kirby	Patrickswell	2–28	35	4	8.75
