= 1992 Limerick Senior Hurling Championship =

Annual hurling competition season

- Dates: 12 July – 27 September 1992
- Teams: 16
- Champions: Kilmallock (7th title); Paddy Kelly (captain); Tony Moloney (manager)
- Runners-up: Patrickswell; P. J. O'Grady (manager)

Tournament statistics
- Matches played: 18
- Goals scored: 59 (3.28 per match)
- Points scored: 390 (21.67 per match)
- Top scorer(s): Gary Kirby (0–38)

The 1992 Limerick Senior Hurling Championship was the 98th staging of the Limerick Senior Hurling Championship since its establishment by the Limerick County Board in 1887. The championship ran from 12 July to 27 September 1992.

Ballybrown were the defending champions, however, they were beaten by Kilmallock in the semi-finals.

On 27 September 1992, Kilmallock won the championship after a 1–12 to 0–12 defeat of Patrickswell in the final. It was their seventh championship title overall and their first title since 1985.

Patrickswell's Gary Kirby was the championship's top scorer with 0–38.

== Results ==
=== First round ===
12 July 1992 First round	Feohanagh	3–11 – 1–10	Western Gaels	Newcastle West Grounds
	T Quaid 1–10, P Quaid 2–0, P Hough 0–1.		J Fitzgibbon 1–2, D Flynn 0–4, S Stapleton 0–2, J Magner 0–1, J Broderick 0–1.

12 July 1992 First round	Patrickswell	0–12 – 1–09	Bruree	Bruff Sportsfield
	G Kirby 0–8, D O'Grady 0–2, S Kirby 0–1, S Carey 0–1.		D Deady 0–4, M Sexton 1–0, E Potter 0–2, M Mullane 0–2, P Potter 0–1.

12 July 1992 First round	Emmets	0–15 – 1–11	Claughaun	Bruff Sportsfield
	F Carroll 0–11, M Wallace 0–1, M Meade 0–1, M Cunningham 0–1, M O'Brien 0–1.		M Galligan 1–7, M Ryan 0–3, A Browne 0–1.

12 July 1992 First round	Ballybrown	0–17 – 1–06	Old Christian	Gaelic Grounds
	P Davoren 0–11, N Doolan 0–2, C Coughlan 0–2, D Stanners 0–1, O O'Connor 0–1.		G Hegarty 0–5, J Hegarty 1–1.

12 July 1992 First round	Doon	3–09 – 3–08	Geraldines	Cappamore Grounds
	M Ryan 2–1, V McGrath 1–2, J O'Donovan 0–3, G McGrath 0–2, R Walshe 0–1.		S O'Neill 2–1, G O'Connell 1–0, N Gammell 0–3, N Nash 0–2, M Murnane 0–1, M Hickey 0–1.

19 July 1992 First round replay	Patrickswell	2–14 – 0–09	Bruree	Bruff Sportsfield
	G Kirby 0–9, S Kirby 2–1, G Hayes 0–1, D O'Grady 0–1, P Foley 0–1, S Carey 0–1.		D Deady 0–6, P Potter 0–1, M Sexton 0–1, E Potter 0–1.

19 July 1992 First round	Ahane	1–14 – 2–09	Hospital-Herbertstown	Cappamore Grounds
	G Mulcahy 1–5, S Moran 0–3, J O'Grady 0–2, M Fitzgerald 0–1, D Harrison 0–1, K Harrison 0–1, P Smith 0–1.		A Garvey 0–7, PJ Garvey 1–2, S Kiely 1–0.

24 July 1991 First round	Adare	2–06 – 1–08	Bruff	Gaelic Grounds
	S Fitzgibbon 1–1, C Murphy 1–0, B Kennedy 0–3, B Heffernan 0–1, T Howard 0–1.		A Moran 1–2, P Barrett 0–4, P Moloney 0–1, T Madden 0–1.

26 July 1992 First round	Kilmallock	2–14 – 2–12	Cappamore	Gaelic Grounds
	P Kelly 0–7, P Tobin 1–2, D Hanley 1–0, S Barrett 0–1, M Houlihan 0–1, P Barrett 0–1, D Clarke 0–1, M Nelligan 0–1.		L O'Brien 0–8, P Gleeson 2–0, J McCarthy 0–2, D Keating 0–1, M Gleeson 0–1.

=== Quarter-finals ===
24 July 1992 Quarter-final	Emmets	1–13 – 1–13	Feohanagh	Ballyagran Grounds
	F Carroll 0–6, M Wallace 1–1, M O'Brien 0–2, W Burke 0–1, M Burke 0–1, M Meade 0–1, N Farrell 0–1.		T Quaid 1–6, P Quaid 0–2, M Sweeney 0–1, J Quaid 0–1, S O'Keeffe 0–1, B Butler 0–1, D O'Sullivan 0–1.

26 July 1992 Quarter-final	Patrickswell	1–16 – 1–09	Doon	FitzGerald Park
	G Kirby 0–4, S Kirby 0–4, R Fitzgerald 1–0, P Carey 0–3, N Carey 0–2, D O'Grady 0–2, A Carmody 0–1.		G McGrath 1–1, R Walsh 0–3, J O'Donovan 0–2, K McGrath 0–1, M Thompson 0–1, G McLoughlin 0–1.

31 July 1991 Quarter-final replay	Emmets	1–16 – 2–04	Feohanagh	Ballyagran Grounds
	F Carroll 0–7, J Bresnihan 1–1, M Wallace 0–2, E Farrell 0–2, M Meade 0–1, J Fitzgerald 0–1, M Burke 0–1, M Wallace 0–1.		T Quaid 1–4, G McAuliffe 1–0.

16 August 1992 Quarter-final	Ballybrown	3–12 – 4–09	Ahane	Gaelic Grounds
	P Davoren 1–2, D Stanners 1–1, P Mulqueen 1–1, C Keyes 0–3, O O'Connor 0–3, N Doolin 0–1, T Hall 0–1.		G Mulcahy 2–3, T Herbert 2–1, T Mescall 0–2, J Moran 0–1, J O'Grady 0–1, D Harrison 0–1.

16 August 1992 Quarter-final	Kilmallock	4–15 – 4–06	Adare	Gaelic Grounds
	P Kelly 2–6, M Houlihan 1–1, D Hanley 1–0, P Tobin 0–3, P Barrett 0–2, M Nelligan 0–2, T Nelligan 0–1.		S Fitzgibbon 3–1, T Howard 1–2, B O'Keeffe 0–1, B Heffernan 0–1, G Kinnivane 0–1.

22 August 1992 Quarter-final replay	Ballybrown	2–12 – 2–09	Ahane	Gaelic Grounds
	P Davoren 0–8, P Mulqueen 1–0, N Doolin 1–0, C Coughlan 0–1, J Mann 0–1, O O'Connor 0–1, J Roche 0–1.		G Mulcahy 2–3, J O'Grady 0–2, J Moran 0–1, T Herbert 0–1, E Meskell 0–1, M Murnane 0–1.

=== Semi-finals ===
23 August 1992 Semi-final	Patrickswell	3–15 – 1–08	Emmets	FitzGerald Park
	G Kirby 0–11, R Fitzgerald 2–0, J Hayes 1–0, D Punch 0–1, D O'Grady 0–1, P O'Grady 0–1, S Kirby 0–1.		F Carroll 1–4, M Wallace 0–2, M Meade 0–1, J Fitzgerald 0–1.

13 September 1992 Semi-final	Kilmallock	2–10 – 1–05	Ballybrown	Gaelic Grounds
	P Kelly 1–5, P Tobin 1–1, M Houlihan 0–3, P Barrett 0–1.		P Davoren 0–4, N Doolin 1–0, C Coughlan 0–1.

=== Final ===
27 September 1992 Final	Kilmallock	1–12 – 0–12	Patrickswell	Gaelic Grounds
	P Kelly 0–6, T Nelligan 1–1, P Tobin 0–2, P Barrett 0–1, S Barrett 0–1, M Nelligan 0–1.		G Kirby 0–6, D O'Grady 0–3, D Punch 0–1, N Carey 0–1, R Fitzgerald 0–1.	Referee: P O'Connor

== Championship statistics ==
=== Top scorers ===
Overall

Rank	Player	Club	Tally	Total	Matches	Average
1	Gary Kirby	Patrickswell	0–38	38	5	7.60
2	Paddy Kelly	Kimallock	3–24	33	4	8.25
3	Frankie Carroll	Emmets	1–28	31	4	7.75
4	Tommy Quaid	Feohanagh	3–20	39	3	9.66
5	Pat Davoren	Ballybrown	1–25	28	4	7.00
6	Ger Mulcahy	Ahane	5–11	26	3	8.66
7	Shane Fitzgibbon	Adare	4–02	14	2	7.00
7	Pádraig Tobin	Kimallock	2–08	14	4	3.50
9	Séamus Kirby	Patrickswell	2–07	13	5	2.60
10	Ray Fitzgerald	Patrickswell	3–01	10	5	2.00
10	Mike Galligan	Claughaun	1–07	10	1	10.00
10	Dan Deady	Bruree	0–10	10	2	5.00

Single game

Rank	Player	Club	Tally	Total	Opposition
1	Tommy Quaid	Feohanagh	1–10	13	Western Gaels
2	Paddy Kelly	Kimallock	2–06	12	Adare
3	Frankie Carroll	Emmets	0–11	11	Claughaun
3	Gary Kirby	Patrickswell	0–11	11	Emmets
3	Pat Davoren	Ballybrown	0–11	11	Old Christians
6	Shane Fitzgibbon	Adare	3–01	10	Kilmallock
6	Mike Galligan	Claughaun	1–07	10	Emmets
8	Ger Mulcahy	Ahane	2–03	9	Ballybrown
8	Ger Mulcahy	Ahane	2–03	9	Ballybrown
8	Tommy Quaid	Feohanagh	1–06	9	Emmets
8	Gary Kirby	Patrickswell	0–09	9	Bruree
