= 1963 Limerick Senior Hurling Championship =

Annual hurling competition season

- Champions: Feenagh-Kilmeedy (1st title)
- Runners-up: Emmets

The 1963 Limerick Senior Hurling Championship was the 69th staging of the Limerick Senior Hurling Championship since its establishment by the Limerick County Board.

Western Gaels were the defending champions.

Feenagh-Kilmeedy won the championship after a 3–06 to 3–01 defeat of Emmets in the final. It was remains their only championship triumph.
