= 1891 Limerick Senior Hurling Championship =

Annual hurling competition season

- Champions: Treaty Stones (1st title)
- Runners-up: South Liberties

The 1891 Limerick Senior Hurling Championship was the fifth staging of the Limerick Senior Hurling Championship since its establishment by the Limerick County Board in 1887.

South Liberties were the defending champions.

Treaty Stones won the championship after a 2–01 to 0–01 defeat of South Liberties in the final. It was their first championship title.

== Results ==
=== Final ===
Final	Treaty Stones	2–01 to 0–01	South Liberties

== Championship statistics ==
=== Miscellaneous ===
- Treaty Stones win their first title and only title.
