= Damien Quigley =

Irish hurler

Personal information
- Native name: Damien Ó Coigligh (Irish)
- Nickname: Squiddie
- Born: 1971 (age 54–55) Limerick, Ireland
- Occupation: Business relationship manager
- Height: 5 ft 10 in (178 cm)

Sport
- Sport: Hurling
- Position: Full-forward
Club
- Years: Club
- 1988–2014: Na Piarsaigh
Club titles
- Limerick titles: 2
- Munster titles: 2
- All-Ireland Titles: 0
College
- Years: College
- 1989–1993: University College Cork
College titles
- Fitzgibbon titles: 1
Inter-county*
Years	County	Apps (scores)
1994–1999	Limerick	13 (2-15)
Inter-county titles
- Munster titles: 2
- All-Irelands: 0
- NHL: 1
- All Stars: 1
- *Inter County team apps and scores correct as of 18:07, 12 April 2018.

Damien Quigley (born 1971) is an Irish hurling selector and former player. At club level, he played with Na Piarsaigh and at inter-county level with the Limerick senior hurling team.

== Playing career ==
Quigley was educated at Crescent College in Limerick before later studying at University College Cork (UCC). He lined with the senior hurling team during his time there, and was part of UCC's Fitzgibbon Cup-winning panel in 1991.

At club level, Quigley began his career with Na Piarsaigh at juvenile and underage levels. He won several Limerick MAHC and U21AHC titles between 1989 and 1990, by which time he had progressed to adult level with the club. Quigley claimed a Limerick JAHC medal in 1990, after scoring three points in the defeat of Drom/Broadford.

Quigley added a Limerick IHC medal to his collection in 1994, after a 1-14 to 0-04 win over Tournafulla. He was in the twilight of his career when he claimed Limerick SHC medals in 2011 and 2013. Quigley also won Munster Club SHC medals following those county victories.

At inter-county level, Quigley first played for Limerick during an unsuccessful two-year tenure with the under-21 team. He later progressed to the senior team and won Munster SHC medals in 1994 and 1996, however, Limerick faced subsequent All-Ireland final defeats by Offaly and Wexford respectively. Quigley was also an All-Star award-winner in 1994. He added a National Hurling League medal to his collection in 1997.

Performances at inter-county level for Limerick resulted in Quigley being called up to the Munster inter-provincial team. He won consecutive Railway Cup medals in 1995 and 1996.

== Management career ==
Quigley served as a selector during Pad Joe Whelehan's term as manager of the Limerick senior hurling team. He was later part of a three-man committee which recommended the appointments of Dónal O'Grady and John Allen as Limerick senior hurling team managers.

== Honours ==
University College Cork

- Fitzgibbon Cup: 1991

Na Piarsaigh

- Munster Senior Club Hurling Championship: 2011, 2013
- Limerick Senior Hurling Championship: 2011, 2013
- Limerick Intermediate Hurling Championship: 1994
- Limerick Junior A Hurling Championship: 1990
- Limerick Under-21 A Hurling Championship: 1990
- Limerick Minor A Hurling Championship: 1989
- Féile na nGael: 1984

Limerick

- Munster Senior Hurling Championship: 1994, 1996
- National Hurling League: 1997

Munster

- Railway Cup: 1995, 1996
