= Dave Clarke (hurler) =

Irish hurler

Personal information
- Native name: Daithí Ó Cléireacháin (Irish)
- Nickname: Davy
- Born: 1972 (age 53–54) Kilmallock, County Limerick, Ireland
- Occupation: Publican
- Height: 5 ft 7 in (170 cm)

Sport
- Sport: Hurling
- Position: Right wing-back
Club
- Years: Club
- Kilmallock
Club titles
- Limerick titles: 2
- Munster titles: 2
- All-Ireland Titles: 0
Inter-county
- Years: County
- 1990-2000: Limerick
Inter-county titles
- Munster titles: 2
- All-Irelands: 0
- NHL: 1
- All Stars: 1

Dave Clarke (born 1972) is an Irish hurling coach and former player. At club level, he played with Kilmallock and at inter-county level with the Limerick senior hurling team.

== Playing career ==
Clarke attended Limerick CBS and played hurling at all grades during his time there, including in the Dr Harty Cup.

At club level, Clarke first played for Kilmallock at juvenile and underage levels, and was part of the club's minor team that won the Limerick MAHC title in 1987. He progressed to adult level and won Limerick SHC medals in 1992 and 1994. Both of these titles were subsequently followed by Munster Club SHC titles. Clarke also lined out in Kilmallock's 1-17 to 2-07 defeat by Sarsfields in the 1993 All-Ireland club final.

At inter-county level, Clarke first played for Limerick during a two-year tenure with the minor team in 1989 and 1990. He immediately progressed to the under-21 team.

Clarke joined the senior team on a permanent basis in 1993, however, he had already lined out with the team in a tournament game in 1990. He won Munster SHC medals in 1994 and 1996, however, Limerick faced subsequent All-Ireland final defeats by Offaly and Wexford respectively. Clarke also collected an All-Star in 1994. He added a National Hurling League medal to his collection in 1997.

Performances at inter-county level for Limerick resulted in Clarke being called up to the Munster inter-provincial team. He won Railway Cup medals in 1995 and 1997.

== Management career ==
Even during his playing days, Clarke became involved in team management and coaching. He had title successes in various grades with Cappamore, Knockainey, Kilmallock and Pallasgreen, while also serving as coach of the University of Limerick team in the Fitzgibbon Cup. Clarke also served as trainer with Limerick's under-21 team in 2003. He was a senior team selector in 2014.

== Honours ==
=== Player ===
Kilmallock

- Munster Senior Club Hurling Championship: 1992, 1994
- Limerick Senior Hurling Championship: 1992, 1994
- Limerick Minor A Hurling Championship: 1987

Limerick

- Munster Senior Hurling Championship: 1994, 1996
- National Hurling League: 1997

Munster

- Railway Cup: 1995, 1997

=== Management ===
Cappamore

- Limerick Junior B Hurling Championship: 1998

Knockainey

Limerick Under-21 A Hurling Championship: 1998

Kilmallock

Limerick Under-21 A Hurling Championship: 2002

Pallasgreen

- Limerick Intermediate Hurling Championship: 2002
