= Pádraig Tobin =

Irish hurler

Personal information
- Native name: Pádraig Ó Tóibín (Irish)
- Nickname: Podge
- Born: 1970 (age 55–56) Kilmallock, County Limerick, Ireland
- Occupation: Garda Síochána
- Height: 6 ft 0 in (183 cm)

Sport
- Sport: Hurling
- Position: Right corner-forward
Club
- Years: Club
- Kilmallock
Club titles
- Limerick titles: 2
- Munster titles: 2
- All-Ireland Titles: 0
College
- Years: College
- Garda College
College titles
- Fitzgibbon titles: 0
Inter-county
- Years: County
- 1993; 1996-1998: Limerick
Inter-county titles
- Munster titles: 1
- All-Irelands: 0
- NHL: 1
- All Stars: 0

Pádraig Tobin (born 1970) is an Irish former hurler. At club level, he played with Kilmallock and at inter-county level with the Limerick senior hurling team.

== Career ==
At club level, Tobin first played for Kilmallock at juvenile and underage levels, and was part of the club's minor team that won the Limerick MAHC title in 1987. He progressed to adult level and won Limerick SHC medals in 1992 and 1994. Both of these titles were subsequently followed by Munster Club SHC titles. Tobin also lined out in Kilmallock's 1–17 to 2–07 defeat by Sarsfields in the 1993 All-Ireland club final.

At inter-county level, Tobin first played for Limerick as a member of the under-21 team in 1991. He first played for the senior team in 1993, but only became a regular panel member in 1996. Tobin won a Munster SHC medal that year, however, Limerick faced a subsequent All-Ireland final defeat by Wexford respectively. He added a National Hurling League medal to his collection in 1997.

== Honours ==
Kilmallock

- Munster Senior Club Hurling Championship: 1992, 1994
- Limerick Senior Hurling Championship: 1992, 1994
- Limerick Minor A Hurling Championship: 1987

Limerick

- Munster Senior Hurling Championship: 1996
- National Hurling League: 1997
