= 1889 Limerick Senior Hurling Championship =

Annual hurling competition season

- Champions: South Liberties (2nd title)
- Runners-up: Caherline

The 1889 Limerick Senior Hurling Championship was the third staging of the Limerick Senior Hurling Championship since its establishment by the Limerick County Board in 1887.

South Liberties were the defending champions.

South Liberties won the championship after a 1–02 to 0–03 defeat of Caherline in the final. It was their second championship title overall and their second title in succession.

== Results ==
=== Final ===
Final	South Liberties	1–02 – 0–03	Caherline

== Championship statistics ==
=== Miscellaneous ===
- South Liberties become the first side to successfully defend their title.
