= Paudie O'Brien =

Irish hurler

Personal information
- Native name: Páidí Ó Briain (Irish)
- Born: 5 September 1989 (age 37) Killmallock, County Limerick, Ireland
- Occupation: Engineer
- Height: 6 ft 0 in (183 cm)

Sport
- Sport: Hurling
- Position: Right wing-back
Club
- Years: Club
- 2006-present: Kilmallock
Club titles
- Limerick titles: 4
- Munster titles: 1
- All-Ireland Titles: 0
College
- Years: College
- 2007-2011: Limerick Institute of Technology
College titles
- Fitzgibbon titles: 0
Inter-county*
Years	County	Apps (scores)
2011-2016	Limerick	17 (0-06)
Inter-county titles
- Munster titles: 1
- All-Irelands: 0
- NHL: 0
- All Stars: 0
- *Inter County team apps and scores correct as of 15:41, 30 June 2025.

Paudie O'Brien (born 5 September 1989) is an Irish hurling coach and player. At club level, he plays with Kilmallock and at inter-county level is a former member of the Limerick senior hurling team.

== Playing career ==
O'Brien played various grades of hurling, including in the Harty Cup, during his time as a secondary school student at Coláiste Iosaef in Kilmallock. He later studied at the Limerick Institute of Technology and joined the institute's Fitzgibbon Cup team. O'Brien lined out at wing-forward in the 1–17 to 2–11 defeat by University of Limerick in the 2011 final.

At club level, O'Brien first played for Kilmallock during a successful period for the club's juvenile and underage teams. He won three consecutive Limerick MHC titles between 2004 and 2006 and followed this by winning four consecutive Limerick U21HC titles between 2006 and 2009. O'Brien made his senior team debut in 2006 and went on to win four Limerick SHC medals between 2010 and 2021. He also claimed a Munster Club SHC medal and lined out at midfield in the 1–18 to 1–06 defeat by Ballyhale Shamrocks in the 2015 All-Ireland club final.

At inter-county level, O'Brien first appeared for Limerick during a two-year tenure with the minor team. He later spent three seasons with the under-21 team, but ended his underage career without silverware. O'Brien was also selected for the intermediate team beaten by Kilkenny in the 2008 All-Ireland IHC final.

O'Brien joined the senior team in advance of the 2011 season. He ended his debut season with a National Hurling League Division 2 medal. O'Brien was later appointed vice-captain of the team and won a Munster SHC medal in 2013, after a 0–24 to 0–15 defeat of Cork. His inter-county career ended after being dropped by new team manager John Kiely in October 2016.

== Coaching career ==
O'Brien first became involved in inter-county coaching when he took a role with the Limerick under-20 team in 2020. He later joined the Kerry senior hurling team as a defensive coach under the management of Stephen Molumphy.

== Honours ==
Kilmallock

- Munster Senior Club Hurling Championship: 2014
- Limerick Senior Hurling Championship: 2010, 2012 (c), 2014, 2021
- Limerick Under-21 Hurling Championship: 2006, 2007, 2008, 2009
- Limerick Minor Hurling Championship: 2004, 2005, 2006

Limerick

- Munster Senior Hurling Championship: 2013
- National Hurling League Division 2: 2011
- Munster Intermediate Hurling Championship: 2008
