= 1962 Limerick Senior Hurling Championship =

Annual hurling competition season

- Champions: Western Gaels (2nd title)
- Runners-up: Kilmallock

The 1962 Limerick Senior Hurling Championship was the 68th staging of the Limerick Senior Hurling Championship since its establishment by the Limerick County Board.

Western Gaels were the defending champions.

Western Gaels won the championship after a 4–05 to 4–03 defeat of Kilmallock in the final. It was their second championship overall and their second title in succession. It remains their last championship triumph.
