= Stephen Lavin =

Irish hurler and Gaelic footballer

Personal information
- Native name: Stiofain O Liobhain (Irish)
- Born: San Diego, CA
- Height: 5 in (13 cm)

Sport
- Football Position: Half back
- Hurling Position: Wing Forward
Club
- Years: Club
- Adare
Club titles
	Football	Hurling
titles	0	5
Inter-county
- Years: County
- 2008 2000's-present: Limerick (H); Limerick (F)
Inter-county titles
	Football	Hurling
Titles	0	
All-Ireland Titles	0	0
League titles	0	0
All-Stars	0	0

Stephen Lavin is a dual player from Co. Limerick. He has played with the Limerick team men's during the 2000s.

He won a Railway Cup with Munster in 2008.
