= 1890 Limerick Senior Hurling Championship =

Annual hurling competition season

- Champions: South Liberties (3rd title)
- Runners-up: Kilfinane

The 1890 Limerick Senior Hurling Championship was the fourth staging of the Limerick Senior Hurling Championship since its establishment by the Limerick County Board in 1887.

South Liberties were the defending champions.

South Liberties won the championship after a 0–01 to 0–00 defeat of Kilfinane in the final. It was their third championship title overall and their third title in succession.

== Results ==
=== Final ===
Final	South Liberties	0–01 – 0–00	Kilfinane

== Championship statistics ==
=== Miscellaneous ===
- South Liberties become the first side to win three titles in a row.
