= 2010 Limerick Senior Hurling Championship =

Annual hurling competition season

- Sponsor: Live 95FM
- Champions: Kilmallock (9th title); Gavin O'Mahony (captain); Tony Considine (manager)
- Runners-up: Emmets; Brian Moloney (captain); Jimmy Carroll (manager)

The 2010 Limerick Senior Hurling Championship was the 116th staging of the Limerick Senior Hurling Championship since its establishment by the Limerick County Board.

Adare were the defending champions.

On 3 October 2010, Kilmallock won the championship after a 1–16 to 1–12 defeat of Emmets in the final. It was their ninth championship title overall and their first title since 1994.

== Results ==
=== Quarter-finals ===
8 August 2010 Quarter-final	Kilmallock	4–18 – 0–08	Granagh-Ballingarry	Gaelic Grounds
	G Mulcahy 2-4, J Mulcahy 2-2, E Ryan 0-6, A O'Shaughnessy 0-2, G O'Mahony 0-1, L Walsh 0-1, P O'Brien 0-1, G O'Sullivan 0-1.		E Chawke 0-5, E Kenneyd 0-1, D O'Connor 0-1, N Kennedy 0-1.

8 August 2010 Quarter-final	Knockainey	2–15 – 1–13	Patrickswell	Gaelic Grounds
	P Kirby 2-5, P Barron 0-4, L O'Shea 0-3, D Madden 0-1, M Cleary 0-1, B O'Shea 0-1.		B Murray 1-9, B Geoghegan 0-3, T O'Brien 0-1.

15 August 2010 Quarter-final	Adare	2–15 – 4–12	Na Piarsaigh	Gaelic Grounds
	D Hannon 0-7, D Sheehan 1-3, W Griffin 1-2, M Noonan 0-2, C Fitzgerald 0-1.		S Dowling 1-8, K Downes 1-2, A Breen 1-1, K Ryan 1-1.

15 August 2010 Quarter-final	Emmets	2–23 – 3–13	Murroe-Boher	Gaelic Grounds
	D Moloney 2-2, P Neenan 0-8, M O'Brien 0-3, S Walsh 0-2, N Quaid 0-2, D Reale 0-2, A McAuliffe 0-1, D McCarthy 0-1, P Leahy 0-1, J Kelleher 0-1.		S Tobin 0-7, P Tobin 1-2, M Ryan 1-1, S Mackey 1-0, K Tobin 0-1, D Dunlea 0-1, P Walsh 0-1.

=== Semi-finals ===
12 September 2010 Semi-final	Kilmallock	2–18 – 1–08	Na Piarsaigh	Gaelic Grounds
	E Ryan 0-6, P O'Brien 1-3, P O'Dwyer 1-1, G Mulcahy 0-3, A O'Shaughnessy 0-2, G O'Sullivan 0-1, S O'Donnell 0-1, P Connery 0-1.		S Dowling 1-6, P Gleeson 0-1, A Breen 0-1.

12 September 2010 Semi-final	Emmets	1–16 – 0–09	Knockainey	Gaelic Grounds
	P Neenan 0-6, Damian Moloney 1-1, A McAuliffe 0-3, J Kelleher 0-2, S Walsh 0-1, N Quaid 0-1, P Leahy 0-1, E O'Leary 0-1.		P Kirby 0-7, M Cleary 0-1, P Barron 0-1.

=== Final ===
3 October 2010 Final	Kilmallock	1–16 – 1–12	Emmets	Gaelic Grounds
	A O'Shaughnessy (0–6, frees), G Mulcahy (1–1), P O'Brien (0–3); J Mulcahy (0–2), P O'Dwyer (0–2), E Ryan (0–2, two frees).		D Reale (1–4, 1–1 frees), P Neenan (0–4, frees), A McAuliffe (0–2, 0–1 sideline), S Walsh, (0–1, free), M O'Brien (0–1).

== Championship statistics ==
=== Miscellaneous ===
- Kilmallock win their first title since 1994.
