= Mike Houlihan =

Irish hurler

Personal information
- Native name: Mícheál Ó hUallacháin (Irish)
- Nickname: Houla
- Born: February 1969 (age 57) Kilmallock, County Limerick, Ireland
- Occupations: Publican, politician
- Height: 5 ft 10 in (178 cm)

Sport
- Sport: Hurling
- Position: Midfield
Club
- Years: Club
- 1985-2006: Kilmallock
Club titles
- Limerick titles: 2
- Munster titles: 2
- All-Ireland Titles: 0
Inter-county
- Years: County
- 1988-1999: Limerick
Inter-county titles
- Munster titles: 2
- All-Irelands: 0
- NHL: 2
- All Stars: 2

Michael Houlihan (born February 1969) is an Irish politician, hurling coach and former player. At club level, he played with Kilmallock and at inter-county level with the Limerick senior hurling team.

== Playing career ==
Houlihan first played hurling at juvenile and underage levels with the Kilmallock club, and was part of the club's minor team that won the Limerick MAHC title in 1987. He progressed to adult level and won Limerick SHC medals in 1992 and 1994, when he captained the team. Both of these titles were subsequently followed by Munster Club SHC titles. Houlihan also lined out in Kilmallock's 1-17 to 2-07 defeat by Sarsfields in the 1993 All-Ireland club final.

At inter-county level, Houlihan first played for Limerick during a two-year tenure with the minor team in 1986 and 1987. He immediately progressed to the under-21 team, but ended his underage inter-county career without silverware.

Houlihan joined the senior team during the 1987–88 National League. It was in that competition that he collected his first silverware when Limerick claimed the league title in 1992. Houlihan won Munster SHC medals in 1994 and 1996, however, Limerick faced subsequent All-Ireland final defeats by Offaly and Wexford respectively. He also claimed All-Star awards in both of those seasons. Houlihan added a second National League medal to his collection in 1997.

Performances at inter-county level for Limerick resulted in Nash being called up to the Munster inter-provincial team. He won a Railway Cup medal in 1992 after a defeat of Ulster in the final.

== Management career ==
In retirement from playing, Houlihan became involved in team management and coaching at club level with Kilmallock. He has coached all levels at juvenile and underage, from under-14 to under-16, as well as training the club's senior team in 2007.

== Political career ==
Houlihan was elected to Limerick County Council as a Fine Gael candidate in the 2009 local elections. He failed to be re-elected at the following election in 2014.

== Personal life ==
His son, Micheál Houlihan, has also played for Kilmallock and the Limerick senior hurling team.

== Honours ==
Kilmallock

- Munster Senior Club Hurling Championship: 1992, 1994 (c)
- Limerick Senior Hurling Championship: 1992, 1994 (c)
- Limerick Minor A Hurling Championship: 1987

Limerick

- Munster Senior Hurling Championship: 1994, 1996
- National Hurling League: 1991–92, 1997

Munster

- Railway Cup: 1992
