= Damien Reale =

Irish hurler

Personal information
- Native name: Damien Ó Roghail (Irish)
- Born: 17 May 1981 (age 45) Hospital, County Limerick, Ireland
- Occupations: Health and safety officer
- Height: 5 ft 9 in (175 cm)

Sport
- Sport: Hurling
- Position: Left corner-back
Clubs
- Years: Club
- Hospital-Herbertstown → Emmets
Club titles
- Limerick titles: 0
Inter-county*
Years	County	Apps (scores)
2001-2011	Limerick	37 (0-2)
Inter-county titles
- Munster titles: 0
- All-Irelands: 0
- NHL: 0
- All Stars: 0
- *Inter County team apps and scores correct as of 18:04, 4 November 2012.

Damien Reale (born 17 May 1981) is an Irish former hurler. At club level, he played with Hospital-Herbertstown, divisional side Emmets and at inter-county level with the Limerick senior hurling team.

== Career ==
At club level, Reale first played for Hospital-Herbertstown at juvenile and underage levels before progressing to adult level. He claimed his first Limerick IHC medal in 2000 following a 2–11 to 1–05 win over South Liberties in the final. He added a Limerick JAHC medal to his collection in 2005. Reale won a second Limerick IHC medal after a 2–11 to 0–15 win over Dromin/Athlacca.

At inter-county level, Reale first appeared for Limerick as a member of the minor team in 1999. He immediately progressed to the under-21 team and won three successive All-Ireland U21HC medals between 2000 and 2002.

Reale made his senior team debut in the National Hurling League in 2001. He was appointed team captain in 2007, in the absence of the nominated James O'Brien. Reale captained the team when Limerick had a 2–17 to 1–15 defeat by Kilkenny in the 2007 All-Ireland final. He retired from inter-county hurling in November 2009 in protest over changes made in the Limerick hurling panel by team manager Justin McCarthy, but returned almost a year later. Reale won a National Hurling League Division 2 medal in 2011 following a 4–12 to 2–13 defeat of Clare in the final. He retired from inter-county hurling at the end of that season.

Performances at inter-county level for Limerick resulted in Reale being called up to the Munster inter-provincial team. He won his sole Railway Cup medal in 2001 following a defeat of Connacht in the final.

== Honours ==
Hospital-Herbertstown

- Limerick Intermediate Hurling Championship: 2000, 2010
- Limerick Junior A Hurling Championship: 2005

Limerick

- National Hurling League Division 2: 2011
- All-Ireland Under-21 Hurling Championship: 2000, 2001, 2002
- Munster Under-21 Hurling Championship: 2000, 2001, 2002
- Waterford Crystal Cup: 2006

Munster

- Railway Cup: 2001
