= Jim Flood =

Irish hurler

Personal information
- Native name: Séamus Ó Maoltuile (Irish)
- Born: 8 October 1875 Caherline, County Limerick, Ireland
- Died: 30 November 1918 (aged 43) Caherline, County Limerick, Ireland

Sport
- Sport: Hurling
- Position: Right corner-back
Club
- Years: Club
- Caherline
Club titles
- Limerick titles: 3
Inter-county
- Years: County
- Limerick
Inter-county titles
- Munster titles: 1
- All-Irelands: 1

James Flood (8 October 1875 – 30 November 1918) was an Irish hurler who played with the Limerick senior team.

Born in Caherline, County Limerick, Flood first played competitive hurling in his youth. He quickly established himself on the Caherline team and won county senior championship medals in 1896, 1905 and 1907.

After success at club level, Flood joined the Limerick senior team. He was part of the team that won All-Ireland, Munster and Croke Cup titles in 1897.

Flood was also the Great Great Grandfather of English footballer Harry Kane. Flood was Kane’s Father’s Mother’s Grandfather.

Flood died on 30 November 1918 as a result of the 1918 flu pandemic.

== Honours ==
Caherline

- Limerick Senior Hurling Championship (3): 1896, 1905, 1907

Limerick

- All-Ireland Senior Hurling Championship (1): 1897
- Munster Senior Hurling Championship (1): 1897
- Croke Cup (1): 1897
