= Eoin Foley =

Irish hurler

Personal information
- Native name: Eoin Ó Foghlú (Irish)
- Born: 1981 (age 44–45) Patrickswell, County Limerick, Ireland

Sport
- Sport: Hurling
- Position: Centre-back
Club
- Years: Club
- Patrickswell
Club titles
- Limerick titles: 5
Inter-county*
Years	County	Apps (scores)
2001-2009	Limerick	8 (0-4)
Inter-county titles
- Munster titles: 0
- All-Irelands: 0
- NHL: 0
- All Stars: 0
- *Inter County team apps and scores correct as of 16:10, 30 October 2012.

Eoin Foley (born 1981) is an Irish hurler who played as a centre-back for the Limerick senior team.

Foley made his first appearance for the team during the 2001 championship and was a regular member of the panel for a number of seasons until his retirement after the 2009 championship . A two-time All-Ireland medalist in the under-21 grade, he enjoyed little success as a member of the county senior team. Foley ended up an All-Ireland runner-up as a substitute on one occasion.

At club level Foley is a two-time county club championship medalist with Patrickswell.Limerick City All star player at all underage levels

== Playing career ==
=== Club ===
Foley played his club hurling with Patrickswell and has enjoyed much success.

In 2000 he lined out in his first championship decider when he came on as a substitute. Doon provided the opposition, however, a narrow 0–16 to 0–15 victory gave Foley his first championship medal.

After surrendering their title in 2001, Patrickswell were back in the championship decider again in 2003. A 1–13 to 0–14 defeat of Adare saw Foley add a second championship medal to his collection.

=== Inter-county ===
Foley first came to prominence on the inter-county scene as a member of the Limerick under-21 hurling team in 2001. He won his first Munster medal that year as Limerick retained their provincial title following a 3–14 to 2–16 defeat of Tipperary. Limerick later went on to defeat Wexford by just a single point to retain their All-Ireland title. It was Foley's first All-Ireland medal.

Limerick retained the provincial title again in 2002 with Foley winning his second Munster medal following a 1–20 to 2–14 defeat of Tipperary. A subsequent 3–17 to 0-8 trouncing of Galway gave Foley a second consecutive All-Ireland medal.

By this stage Foley had joined the Limerick senior hurling team. He made his senior championship debut as a substitute in an All-Ireland quarter-final defeat by Wexford in 2001.

Foley was a regular in the National League and championship over the next few seasons, however, Limerick hurling went onto decline and he played no part in the 2004 and 2005 campaigns.

In 2006 Foley returned to the Limerick panel. He was an unused substitute the following year as Limerick faced a 2–19 to 1–15 defeat by Kilkenny in the All-Ireland final.

Foley played his last game for Limerick in a 0–25 to 0-17 Munster semi-final defeat by Waterford in 2009.
