= 1961 Limerick Senior Hurling Championship =

Annual hurling competition season

- Champions: Western Gaels (1st title)
- Runners-up: Treaty Sarsfields

The 1961 Limerick Senior Hurling Championship was the 67th staging of the Limerick Senior Hurling Championship since its establishment by the Limerick County Board.

Kilmallock were the defending champions.

Western Gaels won the championship after a 7–04 to 0–09 defeat of Treaty Sarsfields in the final. It was their first ever championship title.
