= Shane Fitzgibbon =

Irish hurler

Personal information
- Native name: Seán Mac Giobúin (Irish)
- Born: April 1963 (age 63) Adare; County Limerick, Ireland
- Occupation: Bank official

Sport
- Sport: Hurling
- Position: Midfield
Club
- Years: Club
- Adare
Club titles
- Limerick titles: 0
College
- Years: College
- NIHE Limerick
College titles
- Fitzgibbon titles: 0
Inter-county
Years	County	Apps (scores)
1984-1993	Limerick	(9-17)
Inter-county titles
- Munster titles: 2
- All-Irelands: 0
- NHL: 2
- All Stars: 0

Shane Fitzgibbon (born April 1963) is an Irish hurling coach and former player. At club level, he played with Adare and at inter-county level with the Limerick senior hurling team.

== Playing career ==
Fitzgibbon attended St Clement's College in Limerick, however, his hurling there was limited to the lower grades as the school's primary sport was rugby union. He later attended NIHE Limerick and lined out in the Fitzgibbon Cup.

At club level, Fitzgibbon first played for Adare at juvenile and underage levels. He was part of the club's under-21 team that claimed the Limerick U21HC title after a defeat of Ardagh in 1983. Fitzgibbon had already joined the Adare senior team by that stage and lost four Limerick SHC finals in a ten-year period between 1986 and 1996.

Fitzgibbon first played for Limerick during a two-year tenure with the under-21 team. He progressed to the senior team and won a National Hurling League medal in his debut season in 1985. Fitzgibbon added a second National League medal to his collection in 1992.

Performances at inter-county level for Limerick resulted in Fitzgibbon being called up to the Munster inter-provincial team. He lined out for the province on four occasions but ended his career without a Railway Cup medal.

== Coaching career ==
Fitzgibbon was still a player when he began his coaching career at club level with Adare. He coached the club's minor team to the Limerick MHC title in 1990. Fitzgibbon continued his involvement at club level and also with Limerick's underage academy.

== Honours ==
=== Player ===
Adare

- Limerick Under-21 Hurling Championship: 1983

Limerick

- National Hurling League: 1984–85, 1991–92

=== Management ===
Adare

- Limerick Minor Hurling Championship: 1990
