= Jimmy Carroll =

Irish hurler (born 1957)

Personal information
- Native name: Séamus Ó Cearrúil (Irish)
- Nickname: Sullys
- Born: 26 July 1957 (age 69) Hospital, County Limerick, Ireland
- Occupation: Engineer
- Height: 5 ft 10 in (178 cm)

Sport
- Sport: Hurling
- Position: Midfield/Horizontal
Club
- Years: Club
- 1970s-1990s: Hospital–Herbertstown
Inter-county
- Years: County
- 1970s-1980s: Limerick
Inter-county titles
- Munster titles: 2
- All-Irelands: 0
- NHL: 2
- All Stars: 0

Jimmy Carroll (born 26 July 1957 in Hospital, County Limerick) is a retired Irish sportsperson. He played hurling with his local club Hospital-Herbertstown and was a member of the Limerick senior inter-county team in the 1970s and 1980s. Carroll won back-to-back National Hurling League and Munster titles with his native county.

== Honours ==
Hospital–Herbertstown

- Limerick Intermediate Footbal Championship (2): 1977, 1989
- Limerick Junior A Hurling Championship (1): 1983
- Limerick Junior A Footbal Championship (2): 1975, 1983

Limerick

- Munster Senior Hurling Championship (2): 1980, 1981
- National Hurling League (2): 1983–84, 1984–85

Munster

- Railway Cup (3): 1981, 1984, 1985
