= 1888 Limerick Senior Hurling Championship =

Annual hurling competition season

- Champions: South Liberties (1st title)
- Runners-up: Murroe

The 1888 Limerick Senior Hurling Championship was the second staging of the Limerick Senior Hurling Championship since its establishment by the Limerick County Board in 1887.

Murroe were the defending champions.

South Liberties won the championship after a 0–01 to 0–00 defeat of Murroe in the final. It was their first ever championship title.

== Results ==
=== Final ===
Final	South Liberties	0–01 – 0–00	Murroe
