= Frankie Carroll =

Irish hurler

Personal information
- Native name: Pronsias Ó Cearrúil (Irish)
- Born: 1970 (age 55–56) Garryspillane, County Limerick, Ireland
- Occupation: Sales rep
- Height: 6 ft 2 in (188 cm)

Sport
- Sport: Hurling
- Position: Centre-forward
Clubs
- Years: Club
- Garryspillane → Emmets
Club titles
- Limerick titles: 1
Inter-county
- Years: County
- 1991-1997: Limerick
Inter-county titles
- Munster titles: 2
- All-Irelands: 0
- NHL: 2
- All Stars: 0

Francis Carroll (born 1970) is an Irish former hurler. At club level, he played with Garryspillane and at inter-county level with the Limerick senior hurling team.

== Career ==
Carroll first played for the Garryspillane club at juvenile and underage levels, before eventually progressing to adult level. He won a Limerick IHC medal in 1990, after scoring 1-03 in the final replay against Ardagh. He collected a second Limerick IHC title in 1996 when he also served as team captain. Carroll also won a Limerick SHC medal in 2005, when Garryspillane beat Kilmallock to claim their very first title.

At inter-county level, Clarke first played for Limerick as a member of the minor team in 1988. He immediately progressed to the under-21 team and spent three consecutive years in that grade.

Carroll joined the senior team in 1991 and quickly claimed his first silverware when Limerick claimed the National Hurling League title in 1992. He won Munster SHC medals in 1994 and 1996, however, Limerick faced subsequent All-Ireland final defeats by Offaly and Wexford respectively. Carroll added a second National League medal to his collection in 1997.

Performances at inter-county level for Limerick resulted in Carroll being called up to the Munster inter-provincial team. He made his only appearance in 1994 but failed to win a Railway Cup medal.

== Personal life ==
His brothers, Mossie and Brian, played with Limerick in the defeat by Galway in the 1980 All-Ireland final.

== Honours ==
Garryspillane

- Limerick Senior Hurling Championship: 2005
- Limerick Intermediate Hurling Championship: 1990, 1996 (c)

Limerick

- Munster Senior Hurling Championship: 1994, 1996
- National Hurling League: 1991–92, 1997
