= Live 95 =

Radio station in Limerick, Ireland

Live95
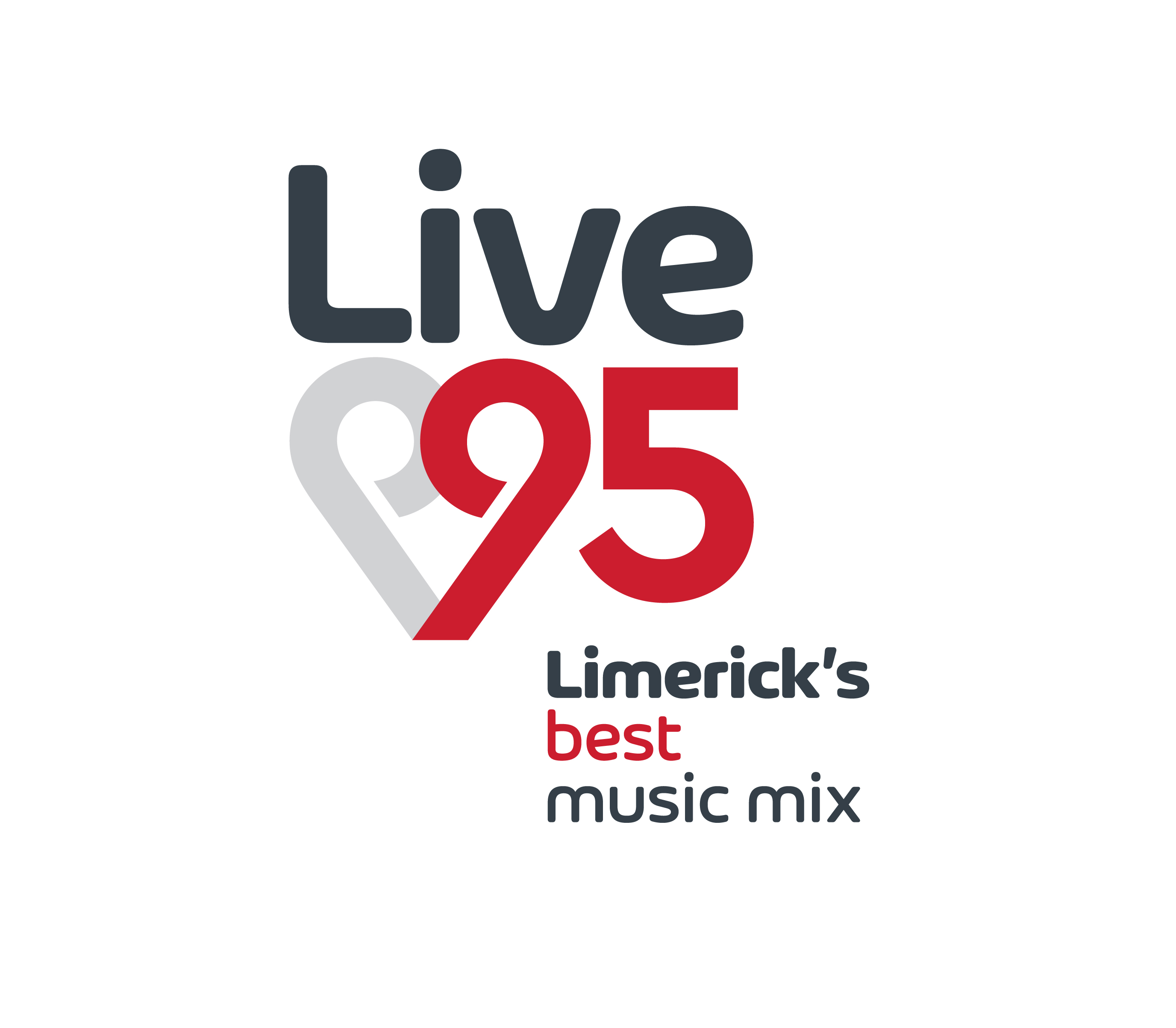

Limerick, Ireland; Ireland
- Broadcast area: Limerick and Munster
- Frequency: FM: 95.0, 95.3 MHz

Programming
- Format: AC/talk

Ownership
- Owner: News UK Broadcasting Ltd; (News UK)

History
- First air date: 6 November 1997

Links
- Website: live95fm.ie

Live95 is a radio station in Ireland owned by Onic, the Irish branch of News Broadcasting, broadcasting mainly to Limerick city and county, in Ireland.

== History ==
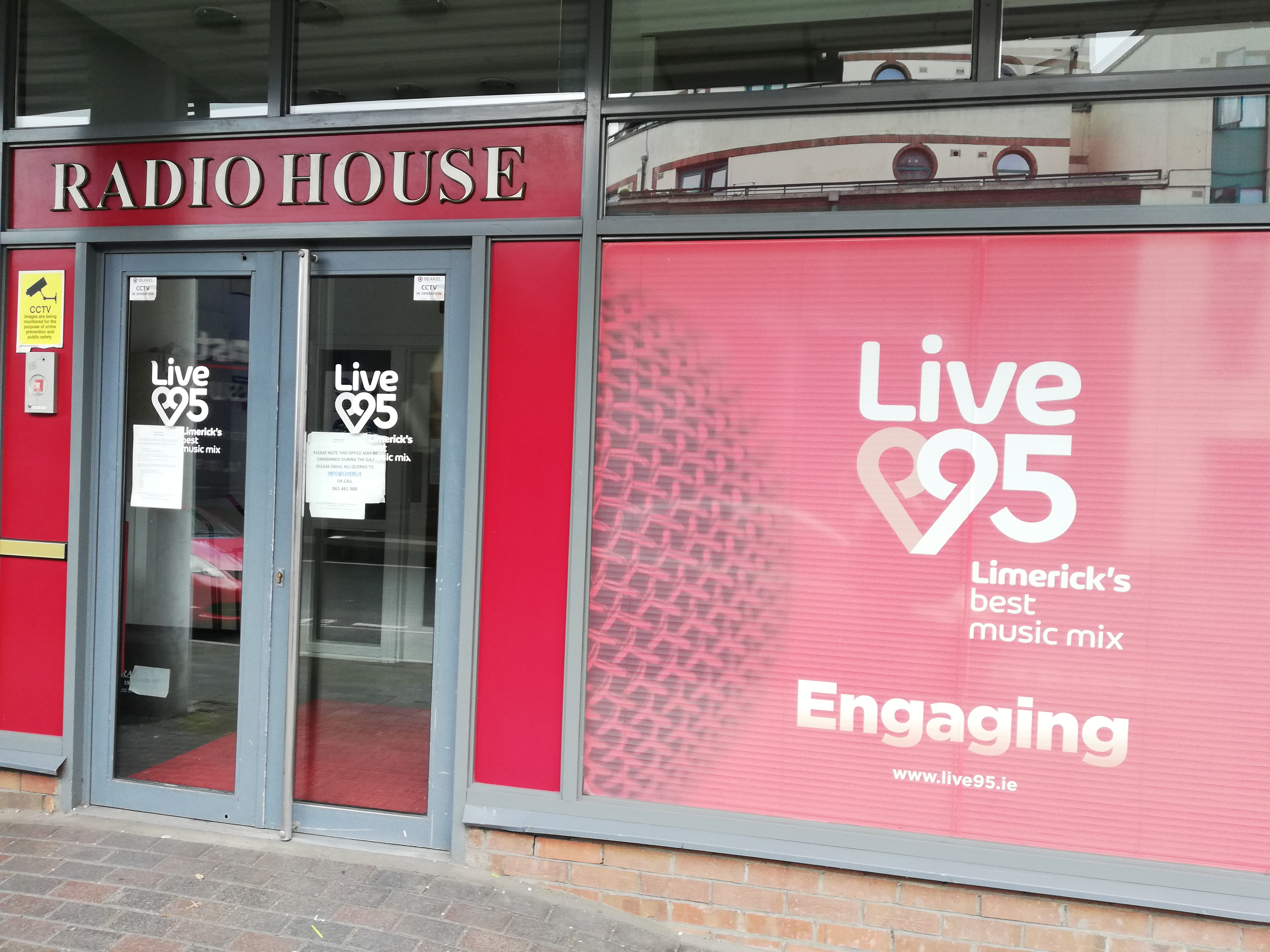
Live 95 headquarters at Radio House, Limerick

The station was launched from O'Connell Street in Limerick as "New 95fm" in November 1997, replacing Limerick 95, after Limerick 95 lost its license to broadcast. The 95FM frequency was on the test tone before "New 95fm" took over. "Dreams", by Limerick band The Cranberries, was the first song to be aired on the station. In the 1990s, the station began to increase in listeners. In the year 2000, the radio station moved to a new base in Radio House on the Dock Road in Limerick and changed its name from "New 95fm" to "Limerick's Live 95fm".

== Rebrand ==
In February 2019, the station rebranded from "Limerick's Live 95fm" to "Live95", with an updated tagline of 'Limerick's Best Music Mix'.

Live95 was listened to by almost 50% of adults in Limerick weekly in 2025. Over 88,000 listeners tuned in to Live 95 weekly, according to Ipsos/MRBI JNLR radio listenership figures covering the 12 months up to September 2025.

As of 2026, the station's schedule included Breakfast with Mark and Catriona, the Limerick Today Show with Joe Nash, Afternoons with JP Dillon, Live Drive with Gary Connor and Live95's Hit Mix with Brian McEvoy.

== Frequencies ==
Frequency (MHz)	Transmitter	Service area
95.0	Woodcock Hill	Limerick city and county
95.3	Barnagh	Newcastlewest
