= Western Gaels (Limerick) GAA =

Former Gaelic games division in County Limerick, Ireland

Western Gaels
- Gaeil an Iarthar
- Founded: 1902
- County: Limerick
- Nickname: The Gaels
- Colours: Green and red

Playing kits
Standard colours

Senior Club Championships
	All Ireland	Munster champions	Limerick champions
Football:	0	0	2
Hurling:	0	0	2

Western Gaels GAA was a Gaelic Athletic Association division located in west County Limerick, Ireland. The division fielded teams in both Gaelic football and hurling.

== History ==
Divisional Boards in Limerick were created at the start of the 20th century, with the West Board being formed in 1902. The notion of divisional teams taking part in the SHC and SFC is believed to have first been suggested in the late 1940s. These divisional teams would be composed of players from the various juvenile and intermediate clubs within the division. The divisional system had been operated by Cork GAA in their competitions since the 1930s.

Western Gaels, as the division became known as, had a successful period between 1953 and 1962. During that time the team contested six senior finals in Gaelic football and hurling. Western Gaels won SFC titles in 1953 and 1954, before claiming consecutive SHC titles in 1961 and 1962. They also narrowly missed out on completing the double in 1961.

== Honours ==
- Limerick Senior Hurling Championship (2): 1961, 1962
- Limerick Senior Football Championship (2): 1953, 1960
