= Emmets GAA =

Former Gaelic games division in County Limerick, Ireland

Emmets
- Emmití
- Founded: 1924
- County: Limerick
- Nickname: The Emmets
- Colours: Blue and yellow

Playing kits
Standard colours

Senior Club Championships
	All Ireland	Munster champions	Limerick champions
Hurling:	0	0	0

Emmets GAA was a Gaelic Athletic Association division located in south County Limerick, Ireland. The division was primarily concerned with the game of hurling.

== History ==
Divisional Boards in Limerick were created at the start of the 20th century, with the South Board being formed in 1924. The notion of divisional teams taking part in the SHC and SFC is believed to have first been suggested in the late 1940s. These divisional teams would be composed of players from the various juvenile and intermediate clubs within the division. The divisional system had been operated by Cork GAA in their competitions since the 1930s.

Emmets, as the division became known as, reached the SHC final for the first time in 1963, but were beaten by 3-06 to 3-01 by Feenagh-Kilmeedy. Emmets reached a second final in 2010, but lost after a 1–16 to 1–12 defeat by Kilmallock.

== Honours ==
- Limerick Senior Hurling Championship (0):
  - (Runners-up) 1963, 2010

== Notable players ==
- Frankie Carroll (Garryspillane): Munster SHC-winner (1994, 1996)
- Pat Heffernan (Blackrock): Munster SHC-winner (1994)
- Richie McCarthy (Blackrock): All-Ireland SHC-winner (2018)
- Nickie Quaid (Effin): All-Ireland SHC-winner (2018, 2020, 2021, 2022, 2023)
- Damien Reale (Hospital-Herbertstown): All-Ireland U21HC-winner (2000, 2001, 2002)
