= Caherline GAA =

Hurling club in County Limerick, Ireland

Caherline
- Cathair Laighin
- Founded: 1884
- County: Limerick
- Nickname: The Steeplemen
- Colours: Blue and White
- Grounds: Fr. Hayes Memorial Park, Caherconlish
- Coordinates: 52°35′17.59″N 8°27′57.21″W

Playing kits
Standard colours

Senior Club Championships
	All Ireland	Munster champions	Limerick champions
Hurling:	-	-	3

Caherline GAA (Irish: Cathair Laighin) is a Gaelic Athletic Association club based in County Limerick, Ireland. It is based in the parish of Caherline/Caherconlish in the east division of Limerick GAA.

== History ==
The club was founded in 1884, making it one of the oldest clubs in county Limerick. The early years of the club were its most successful, winning the Limerick Senior Hurling Championship on three occasions; 1896, 1905 and 1907. Caherline also lost four county finals in this period; 1889, 1898 (when a lack of crowd control caused the match to be abandoned), 1908 and 1916.

By the 1920s, Caherline had slipped back to the junior ranks but returned to the higher grades in 1927 when winning their first Limerick Junior Hurling Championship by beating Kilmallock in the county final. This was followed by a second junior title in 1931, when once again Kilmallock were beaten in the final.

The club went through lean times after this and were not to appear in another county final until 1974 when Glenroe were the victors in the county junior hurling final. Caherline were defeated again in the 2001 county junior hurling final, losing out to Newcastle West. In 2007, however, Caherline bridged a 76-year gap and claimed their third junior hurling championship title defeating Effin on a 3-12 to 1-9 score line in the county final.

In 2008, the club played in the Limerick Intermediate Hurling Championship for the first time and reached the county final. However, Bruff were to be the victors on this occasion, winning on a score line of 3-14 to 0-15 in Ballyagran on 12 October 2008.

By 2016 Caherline were back in the junior ranks but in that year they had a long season in the Limerick junior hurling championship. In the Limerick East division, the club were crowned east junior hurling champions for the first time since 2007 with a 0-14 to 0-11 win over Ballybricken-Bohermore. After defeating Castletown-Ballyagran in the county quarter finals, the club eventually lost out after several replayed games against St. Patrick's in the semi-finals. This series of games (the original semi-final and two replays) involved last gasp equalisers, extra time, abandonments, red cards over-turned and hard-fought comebacks.Eventually, Caherline lost out after extra time in the second replay on a 1-23 to 3-14 score line on 22 October 2016.

Caherline won their fourth Limerick junior hurling title in 2021. They progressed from their group of six teams (divisional championships no longer formed part of the county championship after a restructure in 2020) to reach the county quarter finals. In their quarter final, Caherline had a victory over Ballybrown and this was followed by a semi-final win over St. Patrick's. St. Kieran's were the opposition in the final, with Caherline winning on a score line of 1-13 to 0-10 in Kilmallock on 13 November 2021.

== Honours ==
Hurling

- Limerick Senior Hurling Championship (3): 1896, 1905, 1907
- Limerick Junior A Hurling Championship (4): 1927, 1931, 2007, 2021
- Limerick Under 21 B Hurling Championship (1): 1990
- Limerick Minor B Hurling Championship (1): 2004
- East Limerick Junior A Hurling Championship (14): 1971, 1974, 1992, 1997, 2000, 2001, 2002, 2004, 2005, 2006, 2007, 2016, 2019, 2026
- East Limerick Intermediate Hurling Championship (2): 2013, 2018
- East Limerick Under 21 Hurling Championship (1): 1965
- East Limerick Under 21 B Hurling Championship (8): 1990, 1993, 2000, 2002, 2004, 2005, 2007, 2008
- East Limerick Minor Hurling Championship (1): 1997
- East/City-East Limerick Minor B Hurling Championship (6): 1989, 1991, 1999, 2004, 2005, 2018

Football

- East Limerick Under 21 Football Championship (1): 1965
- East Limerick Minor Football Championship (2): 1961, 1963

== Notable players ==
- Jim Flood
- Andrew Brennan
