= Hospital-Herbertstown GAA =

Gaelic Athletic Association club in County Limerick, Ireland

Hospital-Herbertstown
- An tOspidéal/Cathair Fuiseog
- Founded: 1885
- County: Limerick
- Colours: Maroon and Black
- Grounds: St. John's Park, Hospital
- Coordinates: 52°30′57.19″N 8°28′01.92″W

Playing kits
Standard colours

Hospital-Herbertstown is a Gaelic Athletic Association (GAA) club in County Limerick, Ireland. The club, which fields both hurling and Gaelic football teams, is based in the South Division close to the border with County Tipperary. As of 2027, Hospital-Herbertstown will compete in the Limerick Intermediate Hurling Championship and the Limerick Junior A Football Championship.

== History ==
Founded in 1885, Hospital-Herbertstown is the only club in the history of Limerick GAA to have won the Junior A Football & Hurling double. This was achieved in 1983 with promotion to the Senior ranks in both beating Ardagh in the hurling final and Glin in the football final playing 18 weekends in a row.

The club reached four County Senior Football finals in the 1990s. The club has also played Senior Hurling on numerous occasions. The clubs greatest achievements, outside of the Junior double, was winning the County Intermediate Hurling Championships in 2000 beating South Liberties in the final and in 2010 beating Dromin/Athlacca in the final to get promoted to Senior.

Hospital-Herbertstown players to have represented Limerick include 2007 All Ireland Final Captain Damien Reale as well as Jimmy Carroll, Donie Carroll, Liam Garvey, Andy Garvey, PJ Garvey, Aaron Murphy and Paudie Reale.

== Honours ==
- Limerick Intermediate Hurling Championship (3) Winners 1929, 2000, 2010
- Limerick Intermediate Football Championship (2) 1977, 1989
- Limerick Junior A Hurling Championship (2) 1983, 2005
- Limerick Junior C Hurling Championship (1) 2024
- Limerick Junior A Football Championship (2) 1975, 1983
- Limerick Under-21 A Football Championship (2) 1976, 1977,
- Limerick Under-21 B Football Championship (1) 2005
- Limerick Under-21 B Hurling Championship (4) 2006, 2009, 2010, 2018
- Limerick Minor A Hurling Championship (2) 1933, 2011
- Limerick Minor A Football Championship (3) 1988, 1989, 1993
- Limerick Minor B Football Championship (1) 2025
- Limerick Under-19 A Hurling Championship (1) 2021
- Limerick Junior A Hurling League (1) 1983
- Limerick Senior Football League (1) 1992
- Limerick Intermediate Hurling League (2) 1990, 2022
