= Adare GAA =

Gaelic games club in County Limerick, Ireland

Adare
- Áth Dara
- Founded: 1929
- County: Limerick
- Colours
- Grounds: Brother Rice Field
- Coordinates: 52°33′50″N 8°48′25″W

Playing kits
Standard colours

Senior Club Championships
	All Ireland	Munster champions	Limerick champions
Football:	0	0	4
Hurling:	0	0	5

Adare GAA is a Gaelic Athletic Association (GAA) club based in Adare, County Limerick, Ireland. The club fields teams in both hurling and football and has a strong record in county and provincial competitions.

Adare have reached the County Senior Hurling Final on 12 occasions. After losing the finals of 1968, 1986, 1990, 1993 and 1996, they finally won their first championship in 2001 and successfully defended it in 2002. In 2003, they narrowly missed out on winning three county titles in a row after losing out to Patrickswell in the final. However, Adare managed to complete a historic 3-in-a-row in 2007 and 2008 and 2009. 2008 marked their first win in the Munster Senior Club Hurling Championship when they overcame Toomevara. They were subsequently defeated in the Munster Final by De La Salle on a scoreline of 0–10 to 1-09.

Adare saw a sharp rise in Limerick football prominence winning consecutive promotion through the Junior B, Junior A and Intermediate ranks from 1999, 2000, 2001 respectively. Adare were defeated by Monaleen after a replay in the 2002 Limerick Senior Football Championship. Adare's second Senior Final appearance was in 2010, where they were again defeated by Monaleen. In 2016, Adare won the Limerick Intermediate Football Championship and subsequently gained promotion back to Limerick Senior Football Championship. In the same year, Adare then became the first Limerick club to beat Cork opposition in the Munster Intermediate Club Football Championship overcoming Kiskeam in the Munster Semi-Final. Adare were defeated by a formidable Kenmare Shamrocks team in the Munster Club Final. In 2017, the club won the County Senior Championship for the first time, beating Newcastle West in the Final. In 2018, the club went on to retain the title, becoming the first team in history to win 2 Senior titles immediately following success at Intermediate level. In 2020, Adare then secured a third Senior Championship title beating Ballylanders in the final.

== Notable players ==
Declan Hannon and Ronan Connolly are current members of the Limerick senior hurling team and in 2020 were part of the Limerick team that won the Liam MacCarthy. Declan Hannon is the current Limerick Senior Hurling Captain and has led them to All-Ireland glory in 2018, 2020, 2021, 2022. Mark Foley has played in 2 all Ireland finals and won 2 all-stars in 1996 and 2001. In 1996 Foley won young player of the year. He was captain of the Limerick senior team in 2002, 2003, 2008 and 2009. In 2009, he became Limerick's most "capped" ever player when he reached a record 47 senior championship appearances for the county. Other players to have represented Limerick at Senior level include: Timmy Houlihan, Conor Fitzgerald, Jack Foley, Donncha Sheehan, Michael Clifford and Wayne McNamara.

Hugh Bourke, Robbie Bourke, Paul Maher and David Connolly are current members of the Limerick Senior Football panel. Other players to have represented Limerick at Senior level include: Stephen Lavin, Aidan O'Rahilly, Neil Mulvihill, Mikey Lyons and Conor Fitzgerald.

== County champions ==
2001 Hurling Team: Adare 2-17 Patrickswell 2-08 Timmy Houlihan, J O'Brien, JP Healy, P Lavin, M Alfred, Mark Foley (Capt), E Fitzgerald, T Healy, J Foley, Stephen Lavin, C Murphy, Conor Fitzgerald, Donncha Sheehan, B Foley, B Heffernan. Subs: Tony Houlihan for T Healy, M Twomey for Heffernan, D Butler for B Foley.

2002 Hurling Team: Adare 0-14 Ahane 0-12 Timmy Houlihan, J O'Brien, JP Healy, P Lavin, M Clifford, Mark Foley (Capt), E Fitzgerald, J Foley, Aidan O'Rahilly, Stephen Lavin, C Murphy, Conor Fitzgerald, B Sexton, B Foley, Donncha Sheehan. Subs: B Heffernan for B Sexton.

2007 Hurling Team: Adare 0-14 Croom 0-05 S O'Donoghue, S O'Connell, JP Healy, Stephen Lavin, R Kennedy, Mark Foley, M Clifford, Wayne McNamara, M Noonan, Aidan O'Rahilly, Brian Foley, D Sexton, Donncha Sheehan (Capt), L Costello, Andy O'Connell. Subs: P Lavin for D Sexton, N Mulvihill for R Kennedy, Mikey Lyons for L Costello.

2008 Hurling Team: Adare 0-13 Ahane 0-08 Timmy Houlihan, S O’Connell, JP Healy, Stephen Lavin, R Kennedy, Mark Foley, P Keane, Aidan O’Rahilly, Wayne McNamara, M Noonan, B Foley, Conor Fitzgerald, Andy O’Connell, L Costello, Donncha Sheehan (Capt). Subs: D Sexton for B Foley.

2009 Hurling Team: Adare 1-17 Na Piarsaigh 0-03 Timmy Houlihan, S O'Connell, JP Healy, Stephen Lavin, R Kennedy, Mark Foley, P Keane, Wayne McNamara, Aidan O’Rahilly, Declan Hannon, B Foley, D Sexton, L Costello, Andy O’Connell, Donncha Sheehan (Capt). Subs: Neil Mulvihill for A O'Connell, M Clifford for A O'Rahilly.

2017 Football Team: Adare 2-10 Newcastle West 1-10 J Hickey, O Collins, A O’Connor, E Costelloe, E Ryan, David Connolly, Paul Maher, Shane Doherty (Capt), Stephen Keeley, Neil Mulvihill, Jack English, Mikey Lyons, Mark Connolly, Robbie Bourke, Hugh Bourke. Subs: Shane O’Connor for E Costelloe, Andy O’Connell for Paul Maher, Charles McCarthy for Mikey Lyons.

2018 Football Team: Adare 1-13 Ballylanders 0-12 B Carmody, J Fitzgerald, A O’Connor, David Connolly, O Collins, E Ryan, Paul Maher, Stephen Keeley, Jack English, Davy Lyons, Hugh Bourke, Mikey Lyons, Mark Connolly, Robbie Bourke, Shane O’Connor. Subs: Shane Doherty (Capt) for Jack English, Charles McCarthy for Shane O’Connor, Andy O’Connell for Mark Connolly.

2020 Football Team: Adare 4-07 Ballylanders 0-04 B Carmody, Oran Collins, David Connolly, E Costelloe, Shane Doherty (Capt), E Ryan, Ronan Connolly, Robbie Bourke, Paul Maher, Davy Lyons, Shane Costelloe, Hugh Bourke, Mark Connolly, Shane O’Connor, Mikey Lyons. Subs: Jack English for Mikey Lyons, J Fitzgerald for E Costelloe, Mikey Lyons for Shane O’Connor, Roy Gleeson for Shane Costelloe, A O’Connor for H Bourke.

2024 Football Team: Adare 1-10 Fr Caseys 0-8 Jeffrey Alfred; Shane Doherty, David Connolly, Darragh Lane; Paul Maher, Eoghan Costelloe (Capt), Oran Collins; Roy Glesson, Davy Lyons, Shane Costelloe, Robbie Bourke, Ronan Connolly; Shane O’Connor, Joe Sweeney, Hugh Bourke. Subs: Cian Sparling for Darragh Lane; Mikey Lyons for S Costelloe; Mike Keane for Roy Gleeson; Jack Fitzgerald for Oran Collins; Michael Southgate for Shane O’Connor.

== Adare Camogie Club ==
Adare Camogie Club was formed by a fantastic group of parents spearheaded by Lizzie O’Dea, Fr. Duggan and Fr. Moriarty in 1993. Adare earned promotion after defeating Galbally in Junior a Camogie Championship final in 2021. The following year Adare won the intermediate title beating near neighbours Croagh Kilfinny in the 2022 County Final to proceed to Senior ranks.

Adult Team Success: 2007 Runner Up - Senior B Championship (Promoted to Senior A) 2010 Junior A League Runners Up 2010 Junior A Champions 2012 Intermediate League 2012 Intermediate Champions 2012 Represented Limerick in Munster Junior Club Championship V An Rinn (Waterford) 2018 Junior A League (v Templeglantine) 2021 Junior A County Champions (v Galbally) – earning Intermediate promotion 2022 Intermediate County Champions (v Croagh-Kilfinny) - earning Senior promotion 2022 Munster Junior A Champions - Munster Junior A Champions V Brickey Rangers (Waterford) 2022 All-Ireland Junior Runners Up

== Adare Ladies Gaelic Football Club ==
Adare Ladies Gaelic Football Club was founded in 2005. Initially fielding U10 & U12 sides, the club has since grown and, as of 2019, was fielding teams at U8 up to Adult grades. In 2019, Adare LGFC commenced a "Gaelic For Mothers and Others" program, with up to 32 players participating. The club trains and plays most of its underage matches in The Manor Fields.

Adare LGFC has gone on to win county titles at several different ages and grades, including U18A Shield 2017, Junior Adult League 2017, U18 B Shield 2018, U16 A Championship 2016, various U12 and U14 titles. Junior A finalists 2019 & 2020. Members of the club have represented Limerick at U14/16/17/Minor and Adult grades. Adare captured their first Adult title when winning the Limerick Junior A championship in 2021 beating favoured Athea comprehensively in the County Final. It would complete a remarkable double with the camogie team winning the Junior championship the previous week.

== Honours ==
- Munster Club of the Year; 2001.
- Limerick Senior Hurling Championship (5) 2001, 2002, 2007, 2008, 2009.
- Limerick Senior Football Championship (4) 2017, 2018, 2020, 2024
- County Intermediate Football; 2001, 2016.
- County Junior Hurling; 1964.
- County Junior A Football; 1985, 2000.
- County Junior B Football; 1999.
- County U-21 Football; 2015, 2017.
- County Under-21 Hurling; 1979, 1983, 1999, 2000.
- County Minor Hurling; 1990, 1998, 1999, 2019.
- County Minor Football; 2015, 2020.
