= 1972 All-Ireland Senior Hurling Championship final =

1972 All-Ireland Senior Hurling Final
- Event: 1972 All-Ireland Senior Hurling Championship
Kilkenny	Cork
3-24	5-11
- Date: 3 September 1972
- Venue: Croke Park, Dublin
- Man of the Match: Noel Skehan
- Referee: Mick Spain (Offaly)
- Attendance: 66,137
- Weather: Dry and Sunny

The 1972 All-Ireland Senior Hurling Championship Final was the 85th All-Ireland Final and the culmination of the 1972 All-Ireland Senior Hurling Championship, an inter-county hurling tournament for the top teams in Ireland. The match was held at Croke Park, Dublin on 3 September 1972. The match was contested by 1970 winners Cork and 1971 runners-up Kilkenny, and it was refereed by Mick Spain from Offaly.

== Background ==
The All-Ireland final was the twelfth meeting of Cork and Kilkenny in a championship decider. Kilkenny held the balance of power in all previous meetings between the two, having recorded seven All-Ireland victories to Cork's five. Cork, however, also defeated Kilkenny in the 1903 All-Ireland 'home' final before putting London to the sword in the 'proper' final. Both sides last met in the All-Ireland final of 1969 when Kilkenny recorded their first championship victory over Cork since 1947. Kilkenny enjoyed a very successful decade in the sixties, claiming championship titles in 1963, 1967 and 1969. Cork's sole All-Ireland title of the decade came in 1966, a full twelve years after their previous All-Ireland triumph. Moreover, Cork had lost the All-Ireland final of 1969 to Kilkenny. The thought of losing a second championship decider in succession to one of their biggest rivals proved a great motivation.

In 1970 Cork triumphed over Wexford in the All-Ireland final to claim their 21st title and draw level with Tipperary at the top of hurling's roll of honour. The following year Tipperary defeated Kilkenny to reclaim the top spot with their 22nd championship. A victory for Cork would put them level with Tipp once again, while a victory for Kilkenny would give them their 18th All-Ireland title and would narrow the gap between them and the other two big teams in hurling's trinity.

== Pre-match ==
=== Referee ===
Offaly-based referee Mick Spain was named as the referee for the 1972 All-Ireland final on 25 August 1972. It was his first time refereeing an All-Ireland final; however, he was a regular 'man in the middle' for National Hurling League and Leinster championship games over the previous two years.

=== Build-up ===
There was much excitement in the buildup to the game with the press extolling the unique glamour of Cork and Kilkenny teams on All-Ireland final day. Everything from the style of hurling to the colour of the team jerseys was analysed.

== Road to Croker ==
Kilkenny		Round	Cork
Opponent	Result	Provincial stage	Opponent	Result
Bye		Quarter-final	Waterford	3-16 - 4-6
Laois	5-15 - 5-7	Semi-final	Tipperary	3-8 - 3-8; 3-10 - 2-7
Wexford	6-13 - 6-13; 3-16 - 1-14	Final	Clare	6-18 - 2-8
Opponent	Result	All-Ireland stage	Opponent	Result
Galway	5-28 - 3-7	Semi-finals	Antrim	7-20 - 1-12

== Match ==
=== First half ===
The weather on the day of the final was fine and sunny with the elements combining to provide excellent conditions for hurling. The opening minutes of the game lived up to the expectation that the game was going to be a classic. The opening score of the day came after two minutes for Kilkenny when Mick Crotty sent his shot straight over the bar. Two minutes later Ray Cummins, Cork's Gaelic footballer-cum-hurler, gathered a cross from Justin McCarthy and responded for his team with a superbly executed goal sent low into the Hill 16 net. Two minutes later Kilkenny were back on level terms, courtesy of a huge Pat Henderson free from his own half of the field and the equalizer from Liam 'Chunky' O’Brien. O'Brien gave Kilkenny the lead with another perfect point before Eddie Keher stretched the lead with a 21-yards free. Cork's Charlie McCarthy brought the teams back level with two more points, however, this period of parity was short-lived as Kieran Purcell put Kilkenny ahead once again with a point from play after a quarter-of-an-hour. Three minutes later Kilkenny 'keeper Noel Skehan brought off a great save from a Charlie McCarthy shot, however, Ray Cummins was standing by to put the ball over the bar. With just over a quarter of the match played Charlie McCarthy found the range with a free and brought the sides level yet again before Ray Cummins put Cork ahead. 'Chunky' O'Brien restored equality with a point, however, Cork soon went to points clear thanks to scores from Mick Malone and Con Roche. After half-an-hour of play O'Brien landed his fourth of the day to narrow the deficit to just a single point. Two minutes later Cork got a massive boost when a long speculative shot from the wing by Mick Malone deceived Noel Skehan and ended up in the Kilkenny net. Cork's lead was eaten into immediately after the restart when John Kinsella scored his first point of the day to steal one back for 'the Cats'. Eddie Keher, who had a relatively quiet opening half by his own standards thanks to the close marking of Tony Maher, registered another score for Kilkenny soon afterwards courtesy of a free. Charlie McCarthy replied for Cork, however, Mick Crotty, the man who captured the first score of the half, also captured the last score of the half. Unfortunately, the Cork captain Frank Norberg had to retire injured just before the interval. In spite of this Cork still led by 2–8 to 0–12 at the short whistle.

=== Second half ===
While the first half served up an exciting feast of hurling, the second half truly enshrined the game as one of the classics of the modern era. Three minutes into the second period Eddie Keher opened the scoring when he pointed a free for Kilkenny. Less than two minutes later O'Brien chalked up another score for Kilkenny when he sent over a spectacular point, his fifth of the day. While Kilkenny started better, Cork soon found their way. A great save by 'keeper Noel Skehan was not cleared by the other defenders and Mick Malone came thundering in for his second goal. Soon after Seánie O'Leary stretched Cork's lead to four when he pointed from play. By this stage everything was going Cork's way as Cummins tapped over another neat point to increase Cork's lead to five. Eddie Keher reduced the arrears when he captured his first point from play after fifty-three minutes. Just a minute later Keher was moved to the half-forward line where he availed of his new-found freedom. It was here that he did most of the damage and secured one of the greatest goals of all time. Keher grabbed the sliotar out of the sky after a puck-out from Skehan and raced up the wing in the shadow of the Hogan Stand. From that sideline position Keher pucked the sliotar as if going for a point, however, the sliotar dropped short, deceiving Cork goalkeeper Paddy Barry, and ending up in the net. After scoring that goal an almost emotionless Keher simply turned around to go back to his normal playing position with blood pouring out of a cut over his eye. Kilkenny were now only a point behind, however, Cork's reply was instant when Ray Cummins palmed the ball into the Kilkenny net a mere thirty seconds later. Another thirty seconds passed before Seánie O'Leary sent the ball into the Kilkenny net for a third goal in two minutes. Straight from the puck-out Con Roche fielded the ball and sent over a magnificent 80-yard shot that had the Cork supporters celebrating. With thirteen minutes left in the game Cork had an eight-point lead, 5–11 to 1-15. Keher responded immediately when he sent a 21-yards free crashing into the Cork net and the comeback was on. From then until the end it was all one-way traffic in favour of Kilkenny. A brace of points brought Cork's lead back to just three before a Frank Cummins solo-run from the heart of midfield resulted in a goal which brought the sides level again. In just eight minutes of play Cork had surrendered their eight-point lead. Worse was to follow for Cork as Kilkenny took the lead with a Keher point from play. Six more unanswered points were scored by a host of Kilkenny forwards before Mick Spain brought the game to an end. In spite of having a quiet opening half Eddie Keher scored 2–9 in all as ‘the Cats’ reversed an eight-point deficit to win by a comfortable margin of seven. It was one of the greatest comebacks in the history of All-Ireland deciders. The final score was Kilkenny 3-24, Cork 5-11.

=== Details ===
3 September
15:15 IST

Kilkenny	3-24 – 5-11	Cork
E. Keher (2-9), L. O'Brien (0-5), F. Cummins (1-0), P. Delaney (0-3), K. Purcell (0-2), M. Crotty (0-2), P. Henderson (0-1), J. Kinsella (0-1), M. Murphy (0-1).	Report	R. Cummins (2-3), M. Malone (2-1), S. O'Leary (1-1), C. McCarthy (0-4), C. Roche (0-2).

Croke Park, Dublin
Attendance: 66,137
Referee: M. Spain (Offaly)

KILKENNY:
GK	1	Noel Skehan (c)
RCB	2	Phil 'Fan' Larkin	(substituted off) 49'
FB	3	Pa Dillon
LCB	4	Jim Treacy
RWB	5	Pat Lawlor
CB	6	Pat Henderson
LWB	7	Éamonn Morrissey
M	8	Frank Cummins
M	9	Liam 'Chunky' O’Brien
RWF	10	Mick Crotty
CF	11	Pat Delaney
LWF	12	John Kinsella	(substituted off) 75'
RCF	13	Ned Byrne	(substituted off) 40'
FF	14	Kieran Purcell
LCF	15	Eddie Keher
Substitutes:
		Ollie Walsh
		Nicky Orr
		Willie Murphy
		Martin Coogan	(substituted in) 49'
		Paddy Moran	(substituted in) 75'
		Senan Cooke
		Mossy Murphy	(substituted in) 40'

CORK:
GK	1	Paddy Barry
RCB	2	Tony Maher
FB	3	Pat McDonnell
LCB	4	Brian Murphy
RWB	5	Frank Norberg (c)	(substituted off) 36'
CB	6	Séamus Looney
LWB	7	Con Roche
M	8	Justin McCarthy
M	9	Denis Coughlan
RWF	10	Gerald McCarthy
CF	11	Mick Malone
LWF	12	Pat Hegarty	(substituted off) 69'
RCF	13	Charlie McCarthy
FF	14	Ray Cummins
LCF	15	Seánie O'Leary
Substitutes:
		Martin Coleman
		John Rothwell
		Paddy Crowley
		Teddy O'Brien	(substituted in) 36'
		Donie Collins	(substituted in) 69'
		Brendan Cummins

MATCH RULES

- 80 minutes.
- Replay if scores level.
- Three named substitutes
