= Liam O'Brien (hurler) =

Irish hurler (1949–2021)

Personal information
- Native name: Liam Ó Briain (Irish)
- Nickname: Chunky
- Born: 27 July 1949 Kilkenny, Ireland
- Died: 23 August 2021 (aged 72) Kilkenny, Ireland
- Occupation: Barman
- Height: 5 ft 10 in (178 cm)

Sport
- Sport: Hurling
- Position: Midfield
Clubs
- Years: Club
- Newpark Sarsfields; James Stephens
Club titles
- Kilkenny titles: 2
- Leinster titles: 1
- All-Ireland Titles: 1
Inter-county
Years	County	Apps (scores)
1969–1980	Kilkenny	26 (4–73)
Inter-county titles
- Leinster titles: 7
- All-Irelands: 4
- NHL: 1
- All Stars: 4

Liam 'Chunky' O'Brien (27 July 1949 – 23 August 2021) was a former Irish sportsperson. He played senior hurling with the Kilkenny inter-county team in the 1970s.

== Early life ==
Liam 'Chunky' O'Brien was born in Kilkenny in 1949. He was educated locally at St. John's De La Salle, a school associated with the O'Loughlin Gaels hurling club. In spite of this, O'Brien would later become a star with the famous James Stephens club.

== Playing career ==
=== Club ===
O'Brien had much success with the James Stephens club and won his first Kilkenny Senior Hurling Championship medal in 1975 before later winning a Leinster club title. This was subsequently converted into an All-Ireland club medal. In 1976 O'Brien won his second county senior medal to complete his collection.

=== Inter-county ===
Although never winning All-Ireland medals at minor or under-21 levels O'Brien established himself as one of the great players on the great Kilkenny senior hurling team of the 1970s. In 1971 he won his first Leinster title, however, in spite of an outstanding display by Eddie Keher, Kilkenny lost to Tipperary in the All-Ireland final. In 1972 he won a second Leinster title before helping Kilkenny to defeat Cork in the subsequent final to win his first All-Ireland medal. 1973 saw O'Brien win another Leinster medal, however, Kilkenny were defeated by Limerick in the All-Ireland final. He won his first All-Star award in 1973.

The Kilkenny team quickly regrouped to win back-to-back Leinster and All-Ireland titles in 1974 and 1975, with O'Brien winning back-to-back All-Star awards also. The 1975 championship saw him produce what many believe to have been his best ever display for Kilkenny, and he was subsequently presented with the 'Hurler of the Year' award. In 1976 O'Brien helped Kilkenny to a National Hurling League title, however, the side later lost their provincial crown to Wexford. In 1978 Kilkenny were back as Leinster champions with 'Chunky' winning his sixth provincial medal. Unfortunately for Kilkenny, Cork completed a three-in-a-row, winning the All-Ireland final by 1–15 to 2–8. In 1979 he won another provincial championship, before going on to claim his fourth All-Ireland medal. It was his last big occasion at Croke Park as he retired from inter-county hurling shortly afterwards.

== Death ==
O'Brien died on 23 August 2021, aged 72.

== Honours ==
James Stephens

- All-Ireland Senior Club Hurling Championship: 1976
- Leinster Senior Club Hurling Championship: 1975,
- Kilkenny Senior Hurling Championship: 1975, 1976

Kilkenny

- All-Ireland Senior Hurling Championship: 1972, 1974, 1975, 1979
- Leinster Senior Hurling Championship: 1971, 1972, 1973, 1974, 1975, 1978, 1979
- National Hurling League: 1975–76

Leinster

- Railway Cup: 1973, 1974, 1975, 1977

Individual

- Texaco Hurler of the Year: 1975
- All-Stars: 1973, 1974, 1975, 1979
- All-Ireland Senior Hurling Championship Final Man of the Match: 1975, 1979
- All-Ireland Senior Hurling Championship Top Scorer: 1978

Awards
Preceded by Pat Henderson	Texaco Hurler of the Year; 1975	Succeeded by Tony Doran
Sporting positions
Preceded by Phil Larkin	Kilkenny Senior Hurling Captain; 1977	Succeeded by Ger Henderson
