= Pat Lawlor (hurler) =

Irish hurler (born 1947)

Personal information
- Native name: Pádraig Ó Leathlobhair (Irish)
- Born: 23 September 1947 (age 79) Bennettsbridge, County Kilkenny, Ireland
- Occupation: Carpenter
- Height: 5 ft 8 in (173 cm)

Sport
- Sport: Hurling
- Position: Right wing-back
Club
- Years: Club
- Bennettsbridge
Club titles
- Kilkenny titles: 2
Inter-county
- Years: County
- 1968-1977: Kilkenny
Inter-county titles
- Leinster titles: 6
- All-Irelands: 3
- NHL: 1
- All Stars: 1

Pat Lawlor (born 23 September 1947) is a retired Irish hurler. He played for his local club Bennettsbridge club and was a member of the Kilkenny senior inter-county team in the early 1970s.

== Career ==
Born in Bennettsbridge, County Kilkenny, Lawlor earned selection to the Kilkenny vocational schools' team during his school days. He won a Leinster Vocational Schools' SHC medal in 1965, after coming on as a substitute in the 6–03 to 4–00 win over Dublin City in the final.

Lawlor first played for Bennettsbridge at juvenile and underage levels before progressing to adult level with the club. He was a substitute when Bennettsbridge won the Kilkenny SHC title in 1967. Lawlor claimed a second winners' medal following a 3–10 to 1–07 win over Fenians in the 1971 final.

At inter-county level, Lawlor first played for Kilkenny as part of the under-21 team beaten by Cork in the 1968 All-Ireland U21HC final. He also made his senior team debut in a National Hurling League game against Laois that year. Lawlor won his first Leinster SHC medal in 1969.

Lawlor won a further five consecutive Leinster SHC medals between 1971 and 1975. He won a first All-Ireland SHC medal after a 3–24 to 5–11 win over Cork in 1972, before ending the season with an All-Star. Lawlor claimed further winners' medals after defeats of Limerick in 1974 and Galway in 1975. He ended his career with a National League title in 1976.

Performances at inter-county level resulted in Lawlor's inclusion on the Leinster inter-provincial team on a number of occasions. He won a total of four Railway Cup medals between 1973 and 1977.

== Honours ==
Bennettsbridge

- Kilkenny Senior Hurling Championship: 1967, 1971

Kilkenny

- All-Ireland Senior Hurling Championship: 1972, 1974, 1975
- Leinster Senior Hurling Championship: 1969, 1971, 1972, 1973, 1974, 1975
- National Hurling League: 1975–76
- Leinster Under-21 Hurling Championship: 1968

Leinster

- Railway Cup: 1973, 1974, 1975, 1977
