= Frank Cummins (Kilkenny hurler) =

Irish hurler (born 1947)

Personal information
- Native name: Prionsias Ó Coimín (Irish)
- Born: 9 November 1947 (age 78) Knocktopher, County Kilkenny
- Occupation: Building contractor
- Height: 6 ft 0 in (183 cm)

Sport
- Sport: Hurling
- Position: Midfield
Clubs
- Years: Club
- Knocktopher; Blackrock
Club titles
- Cork titles: 6
- Munster titles: 5
- All-Ireland Titles: 3
Inter-county*
Years	County	Apps (scores)
1966–1985	Kilkenny	49 (3–18)
Inter-county titles
- Leinster titles: 11
- All-Irelands: 8
- NHL: 3
- All Stars: 4
- *Inter County team apps and scores correct as of 22:14, 6 August 2024.

Frank Cummins (born 9 November 1947) is an Irish former hurler who played as a midfielder at senior level for the Kilkenny county team.

Born in Knocktopher, County Kilkenny, Cummins first played competitive Gaelic games whilst at school in Belcamp College. He arrived on the inter-county scene at the age of seventeen when he first linked up with the Kilkenny minor team, before later joining the under-21 side. He made his senior debut in the 1966 Oireachtas Cup. Cummins went on to play a key part for Kilkenny for almost two decades and won eight All-Ireland medals, nine Leinster medals and three National Hurling League medals. He was an All-Ireland runner-up on three occasions.

As a member of the Leinster inter-provincial team at various times throughout his career, Cummins won six Railway Cup medals. At club level, he began his career with Knocktoper before later joining Blackrock with whom he won three All-Ireland medals, five Munster medals and six championship medals.

Throughout his career, Cummins made 49 championship appearances. His retirement came following Kilkenny's defeat in the 1985 championship.

Cummins is widely regarded as one of the greatest hurlers in the history of the game. Throughout his career he won four All-Star awards as well as Texaco Hurler of the Year in 1983. He has been repeatedly voted onto teams made up of the sport's greats, including at midfield on the Kilkenny Hurling Team of the Century in 2000.

== Early life ==
Frank Cummins was born in Knocktopher, County Kilkenny in 1947. He was educated locally at Stoneyford national school where he first started playing hurling at the age of five. He later attended Belcamp College in Dublin where he played both hurling and football. The football team reached the All-Ireland Colleges final in 1965, however, Cummins’ side lost out.

== Playing career ==
=== Club ===
Cummins first played hurling at junior level with his local club in Knocktopher, the forerunner to the famous Ballyhale Shamrocks club. He later moved to Cork where he joined the famous Blackrock. It was with ‘the Rockies’ that Cummins enjoyed huge success throughout the 1970s and 1980s. He won his first senior county title in 1971 before later winning his first Munster club title that same year. Blackrock later defeated Rathnure in the club championship decider, giving Cummins his first All-Ireland club title.

In 1973 he won a second county title before later adding a second Munster club title to his collection. Once again Rathnure fell to Blackrock in the final of the competition, giving Cummins a second All-Ireland club medal. Two years later in 1975, he won a third county medal before adding a third Munster title to his collection. Blackrock, however, were later defeated by Kilkenny's James Stephens club in the All-Ireland final. Cummins captured a fourth county title in 1978 and, once again, this was later converted into a fourth Munster club medal. Ballyhale Shamrocks, the club from Cummins’ former parish in his native Kilkenny, provided the opposition, however, it was Blackrock who emerged on top giving Cummins a third All-Ireland club medal. The following year he won a fifth county title before adding a fifth Munster club medal to his collection. Blackrock were later defeated in the All-Ireland semi-final. It was the end of Cummins’ All-Ireland club success, however, he did win a sixth county title in 1985.

=== Inter-county ===
Cummins first came to prominence on the inter-county scene as a member of the Kilkenny minor hurling team in the early 1960s. He had little success at this level and later moved onto the county's under-21 team. Here he won a Leinster title in 1968, however, Kilkenny were later defeated by Cork in the All-Ireland final.

By this stage he had already joined the Kilkenny senior hurling team, making his debut in an Oireachtas game in 1966. The following year he was a non-playing substitute as Kilkenny captured both Leinster and All-Ireland honours, however, it wasn't until 1969 that Cummins found a regular place on the team at midfield. That year he missed 'the Cats' Leinster final triumph over Offaly, however, he later lined out in his first All-Ireland final appearance. Cork faced Kilkenny in that game and revenge for the defeat in 1966 was foremost in the minds of the Kilkenny team. For a while it looked as if the Leesiders would triumph over their great rivals once again, however, five points from Kilkenny in the last seven minutes gave the Noresiders the victory and gave Cummins a first All-Ireland medal.

While Cummins had already captured an All-Ireland medal the best was yet to come for the Kilkenny team in the 1970s. 1971 saw Cummins capture a second provincial medal as Kilkenny began to assert their dominance over near rivals Wexford. The Leinster champions subsequently played Tipperary in the only eighty-minute final between these great rivals. The game has gone down in All-Ireland final folklore for a number of reasons. As the first All-Ireland final to be broadcast by RTÉ in colour, the nation saw Kilkenny's Eddie Keher score a remarkable 2 goals and 11 points and still end up on the losing side. The county's ever-dependable goalkeeper, Ollie Walsh, had a nightmare of a game in which he conceded five goals, one of which passed through his legs, while that year's Hurler of the Year, Michael 'Babs' Keating, played out the closing stages of the game in his bare feet. After a thrilling game, Tipp emerged the victors on a score line of 5-17 to 5-14. In spite of this defeat, Cummins’ brilliance at midfield was recognised when he was named on the inaugural All-Stars team.

In 1972 Cummins won a third Leinster title following a victory over Wexford in a replay of the provincial final. Once again, fierce rivals Cork provided the opposition in the All-Ireland final, a game which is often considered to be one of the greatest games of the modern era. Halfway through the second-half Cork were on form and stretched their lead to eight points. Drastic action was required for Kilkenny. One of the most abiding memories of that game is of Cummins collecting the sliothar in his own midfield area before making a magnificent solo-run all the way towards the Cork goal before firing a shot past goalkeeper Paddy Barry. The goal levelled the score and gave Kilkenny the impetus to go on and win the match, giving Cummins a second All-Ireland medal.

In 1973 the Leinster Championship posed little difficulty for Kilkenny and Cummins collected a fourth provincial medal before making his fourth All-Ireland final appearance. For the first time since 1940 Kilkenny would play Limerick in the championship decider. Cummins’ side, as the reigning champions, were credited as the favourites to win, however, a goal from Mossie Dowling and a rampant attack spearheaded by Richie Bennis saw victory go to Limerick on a scoreline of 1-21 to 1-14. Wexford were once again narrowly defeated by Kilkenny in the 1974 Leinster final, giving Cummins a fifth provincial title. In a repeat of the previous year Limerick provided the opposition, however, revenge was foremost in the minds of Kilkenny supporters. The Munster champions stormed to a five-point lead in the first 11 minutes, however, a converted penalty by Eddie Keher, supplemented by two further goals gave Kilkenny a twelve-point win and gave Cummins a third All-Ireland medal. In 1975 Kilkenny defeated Wexford for the fifth consecutive year in the provincial final, giving Cummins a fifth Leinster medal in a row. It was his sixth Leinster title overall. Cummins later lined out in yet another All-Ireland final with surprise semi-final winners Galway providing the opposition on this occasion. The men from the West led by three points at half-time, however, Eddie Keher's huge tally of 2 goals and 7 points kept Galway at bay giving Kilkenny a 2-22 to 2-10 victory and giving Cummins a fourth All-Ireland medal. The following year he won his first National Hurling League title, however, Wexford finally triumphed over their Leinster rivals in the provincial finals of 1976 and 1977. Kilkenny bounced back in 1978 with Cummins adding a seventh Leinster medal to his ever-growing collection. ‘The Cats’ later faced Cork in the All-Ireland final, however, Cummins ended up on the losing side that day as Cork completed the final leg of a famous three-in-a-row of All-Ireland titles. The following year Cummins won an eighth Leinster title before lining out in his eighth All-Ireland final appearance. For the second time in five years, Galway provided the opposition in the championship decider, however, Cummins collected a fifth winners’ medal that day as victory went to Kilkenny in the worst All-Ireland final of the decade.

Offaly emerged as the new Leinster champions in 1980 and 1981, however, by 1982 Kilkenny were back with a bang. Cummins started the year by collecting his second National League medal before later winning a ninth Leinster title. Once again, the age-old rivals of Cork and Kilkenny squared up to each other in the championship decider. The game turned out to be a letdown as Cork were completely overpowered by Kilkenny on that occasion. The final score was 3-18 to 1-15, meaning that Cummins had captured a sixth All-Ireland medal. In 1983 he added a third National League medal to his collection before winning his tenth, and final, Leinster title. The subsequent All-Ireland final was a repeat of the previous year with the result remaining the same. Kilkenny defeated Cork once again, albeit in a much closer game. The victory gave Cummins a seventh All-Ireland medal, and a record eighth overall. It is a record he shares with John Doyle and Christy Ring, however, all of their medals were won on the field of play. In spite of this, no other player except Cummins has won seven All-Ireland medals in one single position on the field of play. His performance in 1983 also earned him the Texaco Hurler of the Year award. Wexford put an end to Kilkenny's hopes of capturing a third All-Ireland title in a row in 1984, a defeat which led to Cummins’ retirement from inter-county hurling.

=== Province ===
Cummins was also a regular player with the Leinster hurling team in the Railway Cup inter-provincial competition. He first lined out with his province in 1970, however, Munster emerged as the victors in the final on St. Patrick's Day. In spite of this loss, Cummins went on to collect five Railway Cup titles in a row in 1971, 1972, 1973, 1974 and 1975. He won a sixth and final inter-provincial title in 1977.

== Honours ==
Kilkenny

- All-Ireland Senior Hurling Championship (8): 1967 (sub), 1969, 1972, 1974, 1975, 1979, 1982, 1983
- Leinster Senior Hurling Championship (11): 1967, 1969, 1971, 1972, 1973, 1974, 1975, 1978, 1979, 1982, 1983
- National Hurling League (3): 1975–76, 1981–82, 1982–83

Blackrock

- All-Ireland Senior Club Hurling Championship (3): 1972, 1974, 1979
- Munster Senior Club Hurling Championship (5): 1971, 1973, 1975, 1978, 1979
- Cork Senior Hurling Championship (6): 1971, 1973, 1975, 1978, 1979, 1985

Leinster

- Railway Cup (6): 1971, 1972, 1973, 1974, 1975, 1979

=== Individual ===
Honours

- The 125 greatest stars of the GAA: No. 26
- Supreme All-Stars Team: Midfielder
- Texaco Hurler of the Year (1): 1983
- All-Star (4): 1971, 1972, 1982, 1983

== Sources ==
- Corry, Eoghan, The GAA Book of Lists (2005)
- Donegan, Des, The Complete Handbook of Gaelic Games (2005)

Awards
Preceded by Noel Skehan (Kilkenny)	Texaco Hurler of the Year; 1983	Succeeded by John Fenton (Cork)
