= Tony Maher =

Irish hurler (born 1945)

Personal information
- Native name: Antoin Ó Meachair (Irish)
- Born: 12 January 1945 (age 81) Cork, Ireland
- Occupation: Office of Public Works employee
- Height: 5 ft 10 in (178 cm)

Sport
- Sport: Hurling
- Position: Right corner-back
Club
- Years: Club
- 1964–1982: St Finbarr's
Club titles
- Cork titles: 7
- Munster titles: 4
- All-Ireland Titles: 2
Inter-county
Years	County	Apps (scores)
1969–1975	Cork	20 (0-00)
Inter-county titles
- Munster titles: 4
- All-Irelands: 1
- NHL: 3
- All Stars: 2

Tony Maher (born 12 January 1945) is an Irish former hurler who played as a right corner-back at senior level for the Cork county team.

Maher made his first appearance for the team during the 1968–69 National League and was a regular member of the starting fifteen until his retirement after the 1975 championship. During that time he won one All-Ireland medal, four Munster medals, three National League medals and two All-Star awards. Maher was an All-Ireland runner-up on two occasions.

At club level Maher is a two-time All-Ireland medalist with St Finbarr's. In addition to this he has also won four Munster medals and seven county club championship medals.

== Playing career ==
=== Club ===
Maher played his club hurling with St Finbarr's in a club career that spanned three decades.

He made his senior debut just out of the minor ranks in 1964 and became a regular at corner-forward. After losing the championship decider to Glen Rovers that year, "the Barr's" were back for a second successive final the following year. University College Cork provided the opposition, with St Finbarr's winning to a 6–8 to 2–6 scoreline. It was Maher's first championship medal. A subsequent 3–12 to 2–3 win over Waterford's Mount Sion gave him a Munster medal.

After surrendering their titles the following year and losing the final to Glen Rovers in 1967, St Finbarr's bounced back in 1968. Maher collected a second championship medal following a narrow 5–9 to 1–19 defeat of Imokilly.

After an absence of six years St Finbarr's returned to the top table of Cork hurling once again in 1974. In spite of being regarded as underdogs against Blackrock, Con Roche helped "the Barr's" to a 2–17 to 2–14 victory. It was Maher's third championship medal. Newmarket-on-Fergus were the opponents in the subsequent provincial decider A low-scoring 0–7 to 0–3 victory gave Maher his second Munster medal; however, during the game a shin-bone injury brought Bernie Scully's career to an end. The All-Ireland final on St Patrick's weekend saw St Finbarr's take on the Fenians of Kilkenny. St Finbarr's won with a 3–8 to 1–6 victory. It was Maher's first All-Ireland medal.

In 1977 a 1–17 to 1–5 win over north side rivals gave Maher his fourth championship medal. A 2–8 to 0–6 defeat of Sixmilebridge in a replay saw him win his third Munster medal. He later lined out in the All-Ireland final with Rathnure, the Wexford and Leinster champions, providing the opposition. Jimmy Barry-Murphy scored the deciding goal, and a 2–7 to 0–9 victory gave Maher a second All-Ireland medal.

1980 saw Maher add a fifth championship medal to his collection as Glen Rovers were accounted for on a 1–9 to 2–4 score line. He later picked up a fourth Munster medal as Roscrea fell narrowly by 2–12 to 1–14. A record-equaling third All-Ireland medal proved beyond St Finbarr's who were beaten by Ballyhale Shamrocks in the decider.

County championship final defeats of Glen Rovers in 1981 and Blackrock in 1982 brought Maher's championship medal tally to seven. He retired from club hurling shortly after the latter victory.

In retirement from the game, Maher became chairman of the club between 1987 and 1996. He later served as secretary of the club.

=== Minor and under-21 ===
Maher first came to prominence on the inter-county scene as a member of the minor hurling team during Cork's unsuccessful championship campaign that year.

By 1966 Maher had joined the Cork under-21 team. He won a Munster medal that year as Cork beat Limerick by 5–12 to 2–6 in the provincial decider. The subsequent All-Ireland final ended in a draw as Wexford recorded 5–6 to Cork's 3–12. The replay also ended all square – 4–9 apiece. At the third time of asking Cork emerged victorious with a tally of 9–9 to 5–9. This victory gave Cork their first All-Ireland title in this grade and gave Maher, who was introduced as a substitute, an All-Ireland Under-21 Hurling Championship medal.

=== Senior ===
Maher joined the Cork senior hurling team during the 1968–69 National League campaign. A 3–12 to 1–14 defeat of Wexford in the decider gave him his first National Hurling League medal. The subsequent provincial decider pitted Cork against reigning champions Tipperary. A 4–6 to 0–9 victory gave Cork a first defeat of Tipp since 1957 while it also gave Maher a first Munster medal. This victory paved the way for an All-Ireland showdown with Kilkenny, however, the team suffered a setback before the game when midfielder Justin McCarthy broke his leg in a motorcycle accident. In spite of this Cork led at the interval, and Kilkenny forward Pat Delaney left the field on a stretcher. Ultimately, Kilkenny scored five unanswered points in the last seven minutes to win by 2–15 to 2–9.

Cork regrouped during the 1969–70 National League, and an aggregate 5–21 to 6–16 defeat of New York gave Maher his second National Hurling League medal. The subsequent championship campaign saw Maher win his second Munster medal as Tipperary were beaten 3–10 to 3–8. Cork later qualified for the All-Ireland final with Wexford providing the opposition in the very first eighty-minute championship decider. The game saw a record 64-point score line for both teams as Cork's Eddie O'Brien scored a hat-trick of goals to give Cork a considerable lead. At the full-time whistle Cork were the winners by 6–21 to 5–10, giving Maher an All-Ireland medal.

In 1971 Maher became Cork's first All-Star recipient when he was named on the inaugural team of the year selection.

Maher won a third Munster medal in 1972 following a 6–18 to 2–8 win over Clare. The subsequent All-Ireland decider saw Cork face Kilkenny. The Rebels went eight points clear after a long-range score from wing-back Con Roche in the 17th minute of the second half. However, they didn't score again. Kilkenny took control with Pat Henderson a key figure at centre-back and Eddie Keher up front. They were level after a Frank Cummins goal and went on to win by eight points. Maher finished off the year by collecting a second All-Star award.

Two years later in 1974 Maher won a third National League medal as Cork defeated Limerick on a score line of 6–15 to 1–12.

The following year Maher won his fourth and final Munster medal following a 3–14 to 0–12 defeat of reigning provincial champions Limerick. Cork were later defeated by Galway in the All-Ireland semi-final in what was Maher's last appearance for Cork.

=== Inter-provincial ===
Maher was selected for Munster in the inter-provincial series of games. He made his debut with the province in 1970 and was a regular until his retirement in 1974. He enjoyed little success in this competition as Leinster dominated at the time.

In 1970 Maher won his sole Railway Cup medal following a 2–15 to 0–9 defeat of arch-rivals Leinster.

== Personal life ==
Born in Cork in 1945, Maher was educated at Coláiste Chríost Rí where he developed a talent for hurling. Maher lives in Turners Cross with his wife Veronica. Maher has four sons Alan, Brian, Mark, and Colin.

== Honours ==
St Finbarr's

- All-Ireland Senior Club Hurling Championship (2): 1975, 1978
- Munster Senior Club Hurling Championship (4): 1965, 1974, 1977, 1980
- Cork Senior Club Hurling Championship (7): 1965, 1968, 1974, 1977, 1980, 1981, 1982

Cork

- All-Ireland Senior Hurling Championship (1): 1970
- Munster Senior Hurling Championship (4): 1969, 1970, 1972, 1975
- National Hurling League (3): 1968–69, 1969–70, 1973–74
- All-Ireland Under-21 Hurling Championship (1): 1966
- Munster Under-21 Hurling Championship (1): 1966

Munster

- Railway Cup (1): 1970
