= Pat Hegarty =

Irish hurler

Personal information
- Native name: Pádraig Ó hÉigeartaigh (Irish)
- Born: 1947 (age 78–79) Youghal, County Cork, Ireland
- Occupation: Building firm clerk
- Height: 5 ft 11 in (180 cm)

Sport
- Sport: Hurling
- Position: Half-back
Club
- Years: Club
- Youghal
Club titles
- Cork titles: 0
Inter-county
Years	County	Apps (scores)
1968-1975	Cork	19 (3-14)
Inter-county titles
- Munster titles: 4
- All-Irelands: 1
- NHL: 4
- All Stars: 0

Pat Hegarty (born 1947) is an Irish retired hurler who played as a left corner-back for the Cork senior team.

Hegarty joined the team during the 1968-69 National League and was a regular member of the starting fifteen until his retirement after the 1975 championship. During that time he won one All-Ireland medal, four Munster medals and four National League medals. Hegarty was an All-Ireland runner-up on two occasions.

At club level Hegarty was a one-time intermediate championship medalist with Youghal.

== Playing career ==
=== Club ===
Hegarty played his club hurling with Youghal. In 1969, he was a member of the team that reached the final of the intermediate championship. Cobh provided the opposition on that occasion. A 3-9 to 0-13 win gave Hegarty a Cork Intermediate Hurling Championship medal.

=== Inter-county ===
Hegarty first came to prominence on the inter-county scene as a member of the Cork under-21 hurling tea in 1966. He made his debut as a substitute in a Munster semi-final defeat of Galway in 1966, however, he played no part in Cork's subsequent Munster and All-Ireland victories.

Two years later Hegarty was captain of the under-21 team. He won a Munster Under-21 Hurling Championship medal that year following a 4-10 to 1-13 defeat of Tipperary. Cork later faced Kilkenny in the All-Ireland decider and Hegarty was moved from centre-back to the half-forward line. A 2-18 to 3-9 victory gave Hegarty an All-Ireland Under-21 Hurling Championship medal.

Hegarty made his senior debut during the 1968-69 National League campaign for Cork. A 3-12 to 1-14 defeat of Wexford in the decider gave him his first National Hurling League medal. The subsequent provincial decider pitted Cork against reigning champions Tipperary. A 4-6 to 0-9 victory gave Cork a first defeat of Tipp since 1957 while it also gave Hegarty a first Munster Senior Hurling Championship medal. This victory paved the way for an All-Ireland showdown with Kilkenny. While Cork were leading coming into the last quarter, Kilkenny scored five unanswered points in the last seven minutes to win by 2-15 to 2-9.

During the 1969-70 National League, an aggregate 5-21 to 6-16 defeat of New York by Cork gave Hegarty his second National Hurling League medal. The subsequent championship campaign saw him win his third Munster medal as Tipperary were accounted for by 3-10 to 3-8. Cork later qualified for the All-Ireland final with Wexford providing the opposition in the very first eighty-minute championship decider. The game saw a record 64-point score line for both teams as Cork's Eddie O'Brien scored a hat-trick of goals to give Cork a considerable lead. At the full-time whistle Cork were the winners by 6-21 to 5-10, giving Hegarty his first All-Ireland medal.

After collecting a third National League medal following a victory over Limerick in 1972, Hegarty later won a third Munster medal following a 6-18 to 2-8 win over Clare. The subsequent All-Ireland decider saw Cork face Kilkenny. Cork dominated the early exchanges and went eight points clear after a long-range score from wing-back Con Roche in the 17th minute of the second half. Remarkably they didn’t score again. Kilkenny took control with Pat Henderson a key figure at centre-back and Eddie Keher cutting loose up front. They were level after a Frank Cummins goal and went on to win by eight points.

Hegarty won his fourth and final National League medal as Cork defeated Limerick on a huge score line of 6-15 to 1-12.

The following year Hegarty won his fourth Munster medal following a 3-14 to 0-12 defeat of reigning provincial champions Limerick. Cork were later defeated by Galway in the All-Ireland semi-final.

=== Inter-provincial ===
Hegarty also had the honour of being selected for Munster in the inter-provincial series of games. He made his debut with the province in 1971 and was a regular for just two seasons. He enjoyed little success as Munster were defeated by Leinster on both occasions.

== Honours ==
=== Team ===
Youghal

- Cork Intermediate Hurling Championship: 1969

Cork

- All-Ireland Senior Hurling Championship: 1970
- Munster Senior Hurling Championship: 1969, 1970, 1972, 1975
- National Hurling League: 1968-69, 1969-70, 1971-72, 1973-74
- All-Ireland Under-21 Hurling Championship: 1968 (c)
- Munster Under-21 Hurling Championship: 1968 (c)

Sporting positions
Preceded by	Cork Under-21 Hurling Team Captain; 1968	Succeeded by Michael McCarthy
Achievements
Preceded by P. J. Ryan	All-Ireland Under-21 Hurling Final winning captain 1968	Succeeded by Michael McCarthy
