= 1976 Railway Cup Hurling Championship =

Irish hurling competition

- Dates: 15 February 1976 - 17 March 1976
- Teams: 4
- Champions: Munster (33rd title)
- Runners-up: Leinster

Tournament statistics
- Matches played: 3
- Goals scored: 19 (6.33 per match)
- Points scored: 60 (20 per match)
- Top scorer(s): Eddie Keher (4-06)

The 1976 Railway Cup Hurling Championship was the 50th staging of the Railway Cup since its establishment by the Gaelic Athletic Association in 1927. The cup began on 15 February 1976 and ended on 17 March 1976.

Leinster were the defending champions.

On 17 March 1976, Munster won the cup following a 4-09 to 4–08 defeat of Leinster in the final. This was their 33rd Railway Cup title overall and their first title since 1970.

== Results ==
Semifinals

15 February 1976 Semi-final	Leinster	6-15 - 0-12	Ulster	Croke Park, Dublin
	E Keher 2-4, T Doran 2-1, M Crotty 1-3, L O'Brien 0-5, P Delaney 1-1, M Quigley 0-1.		E Dornan 0-5, E Donnelly 0-4, R McDonnell 0-1, G McGrattan 0-1, B Mullen 0-1.	Referee: P Byrne (Britain)

15 February 1976 Semi-final	Connacht	3-06 - 2-10	Munster	Duggan Park, Ballinasloe
	J Connolly 2-3, F Burke 1-0, F Spellman 0-2, I Clarke 0-1.		F Loughnane 1-3, R Cummins 1-0, É O'Donoghue 0-2, G McCarthy 0-2, E Grimes 0-1, L O'Donoghue 0-1, T O'Connor 0-1.

Final

17 March 1976 Final	Munster	4-09 - 4-08	Leinster	Croke Park, Dublin
	L O'Donoghue 1-3, R Cummins 2-0, E O'Donoghue 1-1, J Callinan 0-2, F Loughnane 0-2, M Hickey 0-1.		E Keher 2-2, M Crotty 1-2, M Quigley 1-0, M Ruth 0-2, P Henderson 0-2.	Referee: J Rankins (Laois)

== Scoring statistics ==
Top scorers overall

Rank	Player	Club	Tally	Total	Matches	Average
1	Eddie Keher	Leinster	4-06	18	2	9.00
2	Mick Crotty	Leinster	2-05	11	2	5.50
3	Ray Cummins	Munster	3-00	9	2	4.50
3	John Connolly	Connacht	2-03	9	1	9.00

Top scorers in a single game

Rank	Player	Club	Tally	Total	Opposition
1	Eddie Keher	Leinster	2-04	10	Ulster
2	John Connolly	Connacht	2-03	9	Munster
3	Eddie Keher	Leinster	0-08	8	Munster
4	Tony Doran	Leinster	2-01	7	Ulster
5	Mick Crotty	Leinster	1-03	6	Ulster
5	Francis Loughnane	Munster	1-03	6	Connacht
5	Liam O'Donoghue	Munster	1-03	6	Leinster

== Bibliography ==
- Donegan, Des, The Complete Handbook of Gaelic Games (DBA Publications Limited, 2005).
