= Mick Crotty =

Irish hurler (1945–2024)

Personal information
- Native name: Mícheál Ó Crotaigh (Irish)
- Born: 29 September 1946 Kilkenny, Ireland
- Died: 11 October 2024 (aged 78) Kilkenny, Ireland
- Occupation: Businessman
- Height: 6 ft 0 in (183 cm)

Sport
- Sport: Hurling
- Position: Half-forward
Club
- Years: Club
- James Stephens
Club titles
- Kilkenny titles: 4
- Leinster titles: 2
- All-Ireland Titles: 2
College
- Years: College
- University College Cork
College titles
- Fitzgibbon titles: 2
Inter-county*
| Years | County | Apps (scores) |
| 1969-1980 | Kilkenny | 28 (9-36) |
Inter-county titles
- Leinster titles: 6
- All-Irelands: 4
- NHL: 1
- All Stars: 1
- *Inter County team apps and scores correct as of 11:38, 20 June 2015.

Michael Crotty (29 September 1946 – 11 October 2024) was an Irish hurling selector and player. At club level he played with James Stephens, and was also a member of the Kilkenny senior hurling team.

== Early life ==
Born and raised in Kilkenny, Crotty was the son of Patrick Crotty, who served as a Fine Gael TD for Carlow–Kilkenny between 1948 and 1969. His brother, Kieran Crotty, succeeded their father as a TD following his retirement, and remained in that role until 1989.

Crotty first played hurling to a high standard as a student at St Kieran's College, however, his tenure ended without silverware. He later studied at University College Cork and won back-to-back Fitzgibbon Cup medals in 1971 and 1972.

== Club career ==
While his brother had enjoyed success with Dicksboro, a period of decline in the 1960s resulted in Crotty joining the nearby James Stephens club. He had his first club success when James Stephens beat Fenians by 8-05 to 2-07 in the delayed 1969 Kilkenny SHC final. Crotty simultaneously lined out with University College Cork in the Cork SHC and claimed a winners' medal in 1970 after scoring a goal in the 2-12 to 0-15 defeat of Muskerry in the final.

After losing SHC finals in 1970 and 1973, James Stephens claimed the SHC title once again in 1975, with Crotty collecting his second winners' medal. A successful Leinster Club SHC campaign was followed by a 2-10 to 2-04 defeat of Blackrock in the 1976 All-Ireland club final. Crotty won a third Kilkenny SHC in 1976 when James Stephens retained the title after a seven-point defeat of Rower–Inistioge.

Crotty added a fourth and final Kilkenny SHC medal to his collection following a 2-10 to 0-08 win over Fenians in the 1981 final. A subsequent defeat of Faythe Harriers secured his second Leinster Club SHC medal. Crotty added a second All-Ireland Club SHC winners' medal to his collection after a 3-13 to 3-08 defeat of Mount Sion in the 1982 All-Ireland club final. He brought his club career to an end after captaining James Stephens to a 2-14 to 1-08 defeat by Ballyhale Shamrocks in the 1983 Kilkenny SHC final.

== Inter-county career ==
Crotty began his inter-county career with Kilkenny as a member of the minor team that lost the 1963 Leinster MHC final to Wexford. His inter-county career stalled for a period following this, and it was 1969 before he earned a call-up to the senior team. Crotty's debut was a winning one as Kilkenny claimed the Oireachtas Cup after a defeat of Cork. He became a regular member of the team during the 1969-70 National League and was captain for the 1970 Leinster final defeat by Wexford.

Crotty was dropped from the team in 1971 but spent a period of time playing Gaelic football with the Kilkenny senior football team. He was recalled to Kilkenny's senior hurling team in 1972 and won the first of four consecutive Leinster SHC medals before claiming an All-Ireland SHC medal after a 3-24 to 5-11 defeat of Cork in the 1972 All-Ireland final. An All-Ireland final defeat by Limerick in 1973 was reversed a year later, with Crotty claimed a third All-Ireland winners' medal in four seasons after Galway were beaten in the 1975 All-Ireland final. His performances during th 1974 season earned him an All Star.

Kilkenny's sequence of championship success was broken in 1976, however, Crotty added a National Hurling League medal to his collection. He claimed a fifth Leinster SHC winners' medal in 1978, however, Kilkenny lost out to Cork in the subsequent All-Ireland final. Crotty won a sixth and final provincial medal when Kilkenny retained the title a year later. A 2-12 to 1-08 defeat of Galway in the 1979 All-Ireland final gave him a fourth winners' medal in that competition. Crotty brought his inter-county career to an end after a defeat by Offaly in the 1980 Leinster final.

== Inter-provincial career ==
Crotty's performances at inter-county level during his All Star-winning season resulted in his selection for the Leinster team. Be was a substitute when they claimed a record fifth successive title after a 2-09 to 1-11 defeat of Munster in the 1975 Railway Cup final.

== Coaching career ==
Crotty first became involved in inter-county coaching in November 1982 when he became a selector with the Kilkenny senior hurling team. Success was immediate with Kilkenny retaining their National Hurling League title. Championship successes followed with Kilkenny claiming the Leinster SHC title before beating Cork in the 1983 All-Ireland final. Crotty's services as a selector were retained for a further two years without success.

== Death ==
Crotty died at home in Kilkenny on 11 October 2024, at the age of 78.

== Honours ==
=== Player ===
University College Cork

- Fitzgibbon Cup: 1971, 1972
- Cork Senior Hurling Championship: 1970

James Stephens

- All-Ireland Senior Club Hurling Championship: 1976, 1982
- Leinster Senior Club Hurling Championship: 1975, 1981
- Kilkenny Senior Hurling Championship: 1969, 1975, 1976, 1981

Kilkenny

- All-Ireland Senior Hurling Championship: 1972, 1974, 1975, 1979
- Leinster Senior Hurling Championship: 1972, 1973, 1974, 1975, 1978, 1979
- National Hurling League: 1975-76

Leinster

- Railway Cup: 1975

=== Management ===
Kilkenny

- All-Ireland Senior Hurling Championship: 1983
- Leinster Senior Hurling Championship: 1983
- National Hurling League: 1982-83

Sporting positions
| Preceded by Eddie Keher | Kilkenny Senior Hurling Captain; 1970 | Succeeded by Pat Henderson |
