= Con Roche =

Irish hurler, manager and selector

Personal information
- Native name: Conchúr de Róiste (Irish)
- Born: 1946 (age 79–80) Cork, Ireland
- Occupation: Factory worker
- Height: 5 ft 8 in (173 cm)

Sport
- Sport: Hurling
- Position: Left wing-back
Club
- Years: Club
- St Finbarr's
Club titles
- Cork titles: 4
- Munster titles: 3
- All-Ireland Titles: 2
Inter-county
Years	County	Apps (scores)
1965–1976	Cork	23 (1–16)
Inter-county titles
- Munster titles: 4
- All-Irelands: 2
- NHL: 4
- All Stars: 2

Cornelius Roche (born 1946) is an Irish former hurler, manager and selector. He played for Cork Senior Championship club St Finbarr's and was a member of the Cork senior hurling team for ten years, during which time he usually lined out as a left wing-back.

Roche began his hurling career at club level with St Finbarr's. He broke onto the club's top adult team as a 17-year-old in 1963 and had his first success two years later when the club won the 1965 Cork Championship, before claiming further titles in 1968, 1974 and 1977. The highlight of Roche's club career came in 1975 when he was at midfield on the All-Ireland Championship-winning team.

At inter-county level, Roche was part of the successful Cork minor team that won the All-Ireland Championship in 1964 before later winning an All-Ireland Championship with the under-21 team in 1966. He joined the Cork senior team in 1965. From his debut, Roche was ever-present in the half-back line and made 23 Championship appearances in a career that ended with his last game in 1976. During that time he was part of two All-Ireland Championship-winning teams – in 1966 as a substitute and 1970. Roche also secured four Munster Championship medals and four National Hurling League medals. He played his last game for Cork on 8 February 1976.

Roche won his first All-Star in 1972, before claiming a further All-Star in 1974. At inter-provincial level, he was selected to play in four championship campaigns with Munster in the Railway Cup.

After retiring as a player, Roche transitioned into coaching. He was involved as coach with three championship-winning team with St Finbarr's. Roche later served as a Cork senior hurling team selector for their 1985 Munster Championship-winning success. He also had stints as coach with the Kerry and Cork senior hurling teams.

== Playing career ==
=== Club ===
Roche played his club hurling with St Finbarr's and had much success during a golden age for the club.

He made his senior debut while still a minor in 1963 and immediately became a regular fixture on the team. After losing the championship decider to Glen Rovers in 1964, Roche was subsequently suspended for breach of "the ban" on the playing of foreign sports. "The Barr's" were back for a second successive final the following year. University College Cork provided the opposition; however, a youthful St Finbarr's team powered to a 6–8 to 2–6 victory. It was Roche's first championship medal. A subsequent 3–12 to 2–3 trouncing of Waterford's Mount Sion gave him a Munster medal.

After surrendering their titles the following year and losing the final to Glen Rovers in 1967, St Finbarr's recovered in 1968. Roche collected a second championship medal following a narrow 5–9 to 1–19 defeat of Imokilly.

After an absence of six years, a period which also saw Roche being suspended for playing soccer, St Finbarr's returned to the top table of Cork hurling once again. In spite of being regarded as underdogs against Blackrock, Roche gave a masterful display in helping the Barr's to a 2–17 to 2–14 victory. It was his third championship medal. Newmarket-on-Fergus were the opponents in the subsequent provincial decider. A low-scoring 0–7 to 0–3 victory gave Roche his second Munster medal; however, the game was tinged with sadness for St Finbarr's as an horrific shine-bone injury brought Bernie Scully's career to an end. The All-Ireland final on St Patrick's weekend saw St Finbarr's take on the Fenians of Kilkenny. St Finbarr's ability to get goals at crucial times proved to be the difference in the 3–8 to 1–6 victory. It was Roche's first All-Ireland medal.

=== Minor and under-21 ===
Roche first came to prominence on the inter-county scene as a member of the Cork minor hurling team and in 1964 experienced the ultimate success in that grade. A 2–14 to 2–9 defeat of Tipperary gave him a Munster. Cork later overwhelmed Laois in a unique All-Ireland decider. A remarkable 10–7 to 1–4 score line gave Cork the title and gave Roche an All-Ireland medal in what was his last game in that grade.

By 1966 Roche was a key member of the Cork under-21 team. He won a Munster medal that year as Cork trounced Limerick by 5–12 to 2–6 in the provincial decider. The subsequent All-Ireland final ended in a draw as Wexford recorded 5–6 to Cork's 3–12. The replay also ended all square – 4–9 apiece. At the third time of asking Cork emerged victorious with a huge tally of 9–9 to 5–9. This victory gave Cork their first All-Ireland title in this grade and gave Roche an All-Ireland Under-21 Hurling Championship medal.

=== Senior ===
Roche made his senior championship debut in a Munster quarter-final clash with Waterford in 1966. He also played in the semi-final defeat of Limerick, however, he was later dropped from the panel for Cork's subsequent Munster and All-Ireland victories.

By 1969 Roche was back on the team. A 3–12 to 1–14 defeat of Wexford in the decider gave him his first National Hurling League medal. He later lined out with Cork in the championship, however, he was dropped once again for Cork's Munster victory and All-Ireland final defeat.

Cork regrouped during the 1969–70 National League and Roche was back on the team once again. It was a successful campaign for the Rebels as an aggregate 5–21 to 6–16 defeat of New York gave him his second National Hurling League medal. The subsequent championship campaign saw Roche win his first [Munster medal as Tipperary were accounted for by 3–10 to 3–8. Cork later qualified for the All-Ireland final with Wexford providing the opposition in the very first eighty-minute championship decider. The game saw a record 64-point score line for both teams as Cork's Eddie O'Brien scored a hat-trick of goals to give Cork a considerable lead. At the full-time whistle Cork were the winners by 6–21 to 5–10, giving Roche an All-Ireland medal.

After winning a third National League medal following a victory over Limerick in 1972, Roche later won a second Munster medal following a 6–18 to 2–8 thrashing of Clare. The subsequent All-Ireland decider saw Cork face Kilkenny. The Rebels dominated the early exchanges and went eight points clear after a long-range score from wing-back Roche in the 17th minute of the second half. Remarkably they didn't score again. Kilkenny took control with Pat Henderson a key figure at centre-back and Eddie Keher cutting loose up front. They were level after a Frank Cummins goal and went on to win by eight points. Roche finished off the year by collecting his first All-Star award.

Two years later in 1974 Roche won a fourth National League medal as Cork defeated Limerick on a huge score line of 6–15 to 1–12.

The following year Roche won his third Munster medal following a 3–14 to 0–12 defeat of reigning provincial champions Limerick. Cork were later defeated by Galway in the All-Ireland semi-final in what was Roche's last appearance for Cork.

=== Inter-provincial ===
Roche also had the honour of being selected for Munster in the inter-provincial series of games. He made his debut with the province in 1971 and was a regular until his retirement in 1974. He enjoyed little success in this competition as Leinster dominated at the time.

== Coaching career ==
=== Kerry ===
In 1987 Roche took over as coach of the Kerry senior hurling team. A mid-table finish in Division 2 of the National League was followed by a 6–14 to 1–9 Munster quarter-final trouncing by Limerick.

=== Cork ===
Charlie McCarthy's departure as coach of the Cork senior hurling team in 1988 saw Roche cross the border from Kerry to take charge. After securing promotion from Division 2 of the National League to the top flight, Roche's side later fell to Waterford by 5–16 to 4–17 in a replay of the Munster semi-final.

== Honours ==
=== Team ===
St Finbarr's

- All-Ireland Senior Club Hurling Championship (1): 1975
- Munster Senior Club Hurling Championship (2): 1965, 1974
- Cork Senior Club Hurling Championship (3): 1965, 1968, 1974

Cork

- All-Ireland Senior Hurling Championship (1): 1970
- Munster Senior Hurling Championship (2): 1970, 1972, 1975
- National Hurling League (4): 1968–69, 1969–70, 1971–72, 1973–74
- All-Ireland Under-21 Hurling Championship (1): 1966
- Munster Under-21 Hurling Championship (1): 1966
- All-Ireland Minor Hurling Championship (1): 1964
- Munster Minor Hurling Championship (1): 1964

Sporting positions
Preceded by Maurice Leahy	Kerry Senior Hurling Manager; 1987–1988	Succeeded by Maurice Leahy
Preceded by Charlie McCarthy	Cork Senior Hurling Manager; 1988–1989	Succeeded by Michael O'Brien
