= Eamon Morrissey =

Eamon Morrissey may refer to:

- Eamon Morrissey (actor) (born 1943), Irish actor
- Eamon Morrissey (hurler) (born 1966), former Kilkenny hurler
- Éamonn Morrissey (born 1949), hurler
