= Patrick Lawlor =

Patrick or Pat Lawlor may refer to:

- Patrick Lawlor (politician) (1923–1993), Canadian provincial politician
- Patrick Lawlor (rugby union), Irish international rugby union player
- Pat Lawlor (hurler) (born 1948), Irish hurler
- Pat Lawlor (born 1951), American game designer
- Pat Lawlor (writer) (1893–1979), New Zealand writer

== See also ==
- Patrick Lawler (disambiguation)
