= Patrick Lawler =

Patrick Lawler may refer to:

- Patrick Lawler (racing driver), 2000 NASCAR Craftsman Truck Series
- Patrick Lawler of Lawlers, Western Australia and Lawlers Gold Mine
- Patrick Lawler (rugby union), see 1952 Ireland rugby union tour of South America

== See also ==
- Patrick Lawlor (disambiguation)
- Pat Lawler, American model
