= Senan Cooke =

Irish hurler

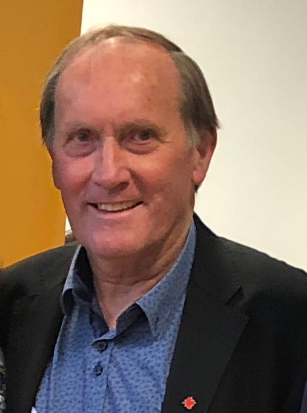

Personal information
- Native name: Senan Mac Dhabhóc (Irish)
- Born: 1945 (age 80–81) Kilmacow, County Kilkenny, Ireland
- Occupation: University lecturer

Sport
- Sport: Hurling
- Position: half-forward
Clubs
- Years: Club
- St Senan's Kilmacow; Dunhill
Club titles
	Football	Hurling
Waterford titles	1	2
Inter-county
- Years: County
- 1972–1973: Kilkenny
Inter-county titles
- Leinster titles: 0
- All-Irelands: 0
- NHL: 0
- All Stars: 0

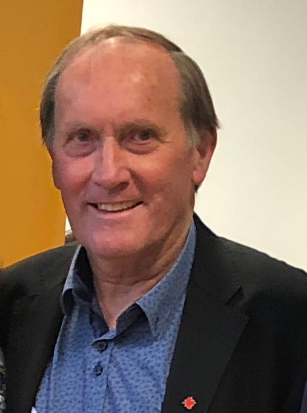
Dr. Senan Cooke profile photo

Dr. Senan Cooke – hurler, author, champion social entrepreneur.

Dr. Senan Cooke (born 1945) is an Irish retired hurler who played as a half-forward for the Kilkenny senior team.

Cooke was born in Kilmacow, County Kilkenny and lives in Dunhill County Waterford.

Whilst working Cooke studied part-time, completing Leaving Certificate, followed by Diplomas in Social Studies, Industrial Engineering and Accountancy & Finance. After DCU Masters in Education and Training (Leadership Strand) and a Doctorate by research on "The Challenge of Educational Disadvantage in a Knowledge Economy – Case Study on Waterford Crystal (1990–2006)” which was completed in 2006. He left Waterford Crystal and joined DCU as a full-time lecturer on Taught Doctorate Programme, until semi-retirement in 2010. He remains a part-time lecturer with DCU.

GAA:

Cooke is an Irish retired hurler who played as a half-forward for the Kilkenny senior team.

At club level Cooke began his career with Kilmacow in Kilkenny, he represented Kilkenny in Senior, U21 and Minor Hurling. He won an All-Ireland medal in 1962 minor grade at right half-forward and an All-Ireland Senior medal in 1972 championship. He was a regular senior panelist for two seasons and was a non-playing substitute. Later he won two county club championship medals in 1978 and 1979 with Dunhill in Waterford.

He filled roles of chairman, secretary and under age hurling coach with St Senan's Kilmacow, County Kilkenny and with Dunhill GAA Club, County Waterford. Currently trustee and Deise Draw promoter with Dunhill

In 2010 Cooke published his first book 'History of GAA in Kilmacow 1884–2010" based on his home GAA club.

Government Appointments included Expert Group in Future Skills Needs (EGFSN) (2000–2004), Futures Ireland (2006–2007), Social Enterprise Task Group (SETF) in Dublin in 2009 and Commission for Economic Development of Rural Areas (CEDRA) (2014–2016)

Author

- The Enterprising Community; A Bottom up Perspective on the Capacity Within Communities to Regenerate (2018).
- The History of the GAA in Kilmacow, 1884–2010 (2010) http://catalogue.nli.ie/Record/vtls000297306
- Action Research in Ireland. McNiff J, McNamara, G & Leonard D (Editors) (2000) Chapter 10. Action Research in an Industrial Setting, Cooke S. http://www.jeanmcniff.com/books.asp
- Social Enterprise in Ireland – A People's Economy, Doyle G & Lalor T (2012) https://www.amazon.com/Social-Enterprise-Ireland-Peoples-Economy/dp/1781190704 Chapter 9. The Private Sector and Social Enterprise- A Case Study of Waterford, Cooke, S & Kavanagh H.
- "Commission for the Economic Development of Rural Areas" CEDRA (2014–2016) https://www.teagasc.ie/media/website/rural-economy/CEDRA_Research_Report.pdf
- Building a Network of Micro Economies With Imaginative Training and Job Creation Programmes https://www.dcu.ie/sites/default/files/cwlel/docs/Dr-S-Cooke-2013-cwlel-centrepaper.docx
