= Paddy Barry (St Vincent's hurler) =

Irish hurler

Personal information
- Native name: Pádraig de Barra (Irish)
- Born: 27 August 1941 (age 85) The Lough, Cork, Ireland
- Occupation: Lab technician
- Height: 5 ft 7 in (170 cm)

Sport
- Sport: Hurling
- Position: Goalkeeper
Clubs
- Years: Club
- St Vincent's; Seandún
Club titles
- Cork titles: 0
Inter-county*
Years	County	Apps (scores)
1962–1974	Cork	31 (0-00)
Inter-county titles
- Munster titles: 4
- All-Irelands: 2
- NHL: 4
- All Stars: 0
- *Inter County team apps and scores correct as of 23:02, 8 April 2015.

Patrick Barry (born 27 August 1941) is an Irish former hurler who played as a goalkeeper for the Cork senior team.

Born in The Lough area of Cork, Barry first arrived on the inter-county scene at the age of seventeen when he first linked up with the Cork minor team, before later joining the junior side. He made his senior debut during the 1963 championship. Barry immediately became a regular member of the starting fifteen and won two All-Ireland medals, four Munster medals and four National Hurling League medals. The All-Ireland-winning captain of 1970, he was an All-Ireland runner-up on two occasions.

Barry was a member of the Munster inter-provincial team on a number of occasions, however, he never won a Railway Cup medal. At club level he is a one-time championship medallist in the intermediate grade with St. Vincent's.

Throughout his career Barry made 31 championship appearances. His retirement came following the conclusion of the 1974 championship.

In retirement from playing Barry became involved in team management and coaching. He was a selector with Cork's All-Ireland-winning under-21 team in 1988.

== Playing career ==
=== St Vincent's ===
Barry came to prominence as a hurler with the North Monastery, while simultaneously lining out at underage levels with the St Vincent's club. He was just 15-years-old when he was drafted onto the club's minor team in 1957 and enjoyed his first success that year when St Vincent's defeated Cú Chulainn's to claim the minor championship title. Barry played in the half-forward line until 1959 when he was persuaded to take over the goalkeeping position. He lined out in goal when the club lost back-to-back Intermediate Championship finals to Mallow and Passage in 1959 and 1960 respectively. Almost a decade after these defeats, Barry secured his only championship silverware at adult level when St Vincent's had a 2-11 to 1-12 victory over Youghal to secure the intermediate title in 1968. He also lined out with divisional side Seandún in the Cork Senior Championship.

=== Cork ===
Barry first played for Cork as a 16-year-old when he was drafted onto the minor team for the 1958 Munster Minor Championship, but was an unused substitute for the unsuccessful campaign. He broke onto the starting fifteen as first-choice goalkeeper the following year, however, he ended his minor career without any silverware. Barry progressed onto the Cork junior team in advance of the 1960 Munster Junior Championship and claimed a winners' medal after Cork's 4-05 to 3-04 victory over Kerry in the provincial decider. He later lined out in goal when Cork suffered a 2-15 to 3-05 defeat by Carlow in the 1960 All-Ireland home final. Barry became goalkeeper on Cork's inaugural intermediate team in 1961, however, Cork suffered a one-point defeat by Tipperary in the Munster final.

Barry first made the Cork senior team in 1962 as a replacement for the injured Mick Cashman. A spell in hospital cost him his place on the team, however, he became Cork's first-choice goalkeeper for the 1963 Munster Championship and made his debut on 26 May 1963 in a 4-15 to 2-11 defeat of Clare. The following year, Barry lined out in his first Munster final, however, he ended the game on the losing side after a 3-13 to 1-05 defeat by Tipperary.

After being dropped from the starting fifteen in favour of Finbarr O'Neill midway through the 1965 Munster Championship, Barry was reinstated as first-choice goalkeeper the following year when O'Neill was forced off the team as a result of severe side effects after a vaccination. He claimed his first Munster Championship medal that year after a 4-09 to 2-09 victory over Waterford in the final. Barry ended the season by winning his first All-Ireland Championship medal after a 3-09 to 1-10 All-Ireland final defeat of Kilkenny. He was later honoured by being named in the goalkeeping position on the 1966 Gaelic Weekly Team of the Year.

Cork lost the 1968 Munster final to Tipperary by nine points, however, Barry claimed further silverware when Cork defeated Wexford to win the 1968-69 National League. He collected a second provincial winners' medal later that season when Cork secured the title after a 4-09 to 0-09 victory over Tipperary in the 1969 Munster final. Barry ended the season by lining out in a second All-Ireland final, however, Kilkenny claimed a 2-15 to 2-09 victory.

Barry won a second National League medal in 1970 after Cork secured the title after a defeat of Limerick. He took over the captaincy of the team shortly after this and claimed a second successive Munster Championship medal - his third overall - after a two-point win over Tipperary. Barry later led Cork to the 1970 All-Ireland final and claimed a second winners' medal as well as having the honour of lifting the Liam MacCarthy Cup after the 6-21 to 5-10 defeat of Wexford in the first 80-minute decider.

After claiming a third National League medal after a 3–14 to 2–14 defeat of Limerick, Barry won a fourth Munster Championship medal following a 6-18 to 2-08 win over Clare in the 1972 Munster final. He later made his fourth All-Ireland final appearance, with Kilkenny providing the opposition for the third time in his career, however, he ended the game on the losing side after a 3-24 to 5-11 defeat.

Barry won a fourth National League medal in 1974 after a 6-15 to 1-12 defeat of Limerick, however, he became embroiled in controversy in Cork's opening game against Waterford in the 1974 Munster Championship. Just before half-time, with Cork struggling, Martin Geary of Waterford pulled a ball to the Cork net. Barry broke his stick in the exchanges and as the umpire, Jim Kirby of Limerick, stepped up to wave the green flag, Barry flung away the heavy end of his goalie hurley in disgust and caught the umpire high on the thigh. He received a red card and was sent off the field, with Cork going on to lose the game by 4-09 to 3-08 and Barry receiving a two-month suspension. He was again included on the Cork team for the 1974-75 National League, however, he was dropped from the starting fifteen in favour of Martin Coleman and was later released from the panel.

=== Munster ===
Barry also had the honour of being selected for Munster in the inter-provincial series of games.

== Post-playing career ==
In retirement from play Barry maintained a keen interest in the game. He served as a selector with the Cork under-21 hurling team in 1988. It was a successful year as Cork captured both the Munster and All-Ireland titles in that grade.

== Biography ==
Paddy Barry was born in the Bandon Road area of Cork in 1941. At a young age the family moved to Blarney Street on the northside of the city. He was educated locally and later spent over thirty years working as a laboratory technician at University College Cork.

== Honours ==
=== Team ===
St Vincent's

- Cork Intermediate Hurling Championship (4): 1968
- Cork Minor Club Hurling Championship (1): 1957

Cork

- All-Ireland Senior Hurling Championship (2): 1966, 1970 (c)
- Munster Senior Hurling Championship (4): 1966, 1969, 1970 (c), 1972
- National Hurling League (4): 1968–69, 1969–70, 1971–72, 1973–74
- Munster Junior Hurling Championship (1): 1960

Sporting positions
Preceded by Denis Murphy	Cork Senior Hurling Captain; 1970	Succeeded by Pat McDonnell
Achievements
Preceded by Eddie Keher	All-Ireland Senior Hurling Final winning captain 1970	Succeeded by Tadhg O'Connor
