= Éamonn Morrissey =

Irish hurler (born 1949)

Personal information
- Native name: Éamonn Mac Muireasa (Irish)
- Born: 1949 (age 76–77) Kilkenny, Ireland
- Occupation: Carpenter
- Height: 5 ft 10 in (178 cm)

Sport
- Sport: Hurling
- Position: Left wing-back
Club
- Years: Club
- James Stephens
Inter-county
- Years: County
- 1970-1973: Kilkenny
Inter-county titles
- Leinster titles: 2
- All-Irelands: 1
- NHL: 0
- All Stars: 0

Éamonn Morrissey (born 1949) is an Irish retired sportsperson. Born in Kilkeny, Ireland, he played hurling with his local club James Stephens and was a member of the Kilkenny senior inter-county team from 1972 until 1973.

== Career ==
Born in Kilkenny, Morrissey first played hurling as a schoolboy. He won a Rice Cup medal with Kilkenny CBS before later attending Kilkenny Vocational School. Morrissey earned selection to the Kilkenny vocational schools' team in 1965, but lost the All-Ireland VS SHC final to North Tipperary having earlier claimed provincial honours.

At club level, Morrissey first played at juvenile and underage levels with the James Stephens club in Kilkenny. He won a Kilkenny MHC title in 1966 and consecutive Kilkenny U21HC medals in 1969 and 1970, by which time he had joined the club's senior team. Morrissey won a Kilkenny SHC medal in 1969, following an 8–05 to 2–07 win over Fenians in the final.

Morrissey first appeared on the inter-county scene with Kilkenny as a member of the minor team. He progressed to the under-21 team but ended his underage career without silverware. Morrissey made his first appearance for the senior team in a game against Cork in 1970, however, it took two seasons for him to establish himself. He won a Leinster SHC medal before claiming an All-Ireland SHC medal after a 3–24 to 5–11 win over Cork in the 1972 All-Ireland SHC final.

Morrissey added a second consecutive Leinster SHC medal to his collection the following year, however, in the period between the provincial final and the 1973 All-Ireland SHC final against Limerick, Morrissey was forced to leave the panel due to his emigration to Australia.

== Honours ==
Kilkenny Vocational School

- Leinster Vocational Schools' Senior Hurling Championship: 1965

James Stephens

- Kilkenny Senior Hurling Championship: 1969
- Kilkenny Under-21 Hurling Championship: 1969, 1979
- Kilkenny Minor Hurling Championship: 1966

Kilkenny

- All-Ireland Senior Hurling Championship: 1972
- Leinster Senior Hurling Championship: 1972, 1973
