= 1979 Railway Cup Hurling Championship =

Irish hurling competition

- Dates: 11 March 1979 - 1 April 1979
- Teams: 4
- Champions: Leinster (18th title); Fan Larkin (captain)
- Runners-up: Connacht; Joe McDonagh (captain)

Tournament statistics
- Matches played: 3
- Goals scored: 9 (3 per match)
- Points scored: 68 (22.67 per match)
- Top scorer(s): Ned Buggy (0-21)

The 1979 Railway Cup Hurling Championship was the 53rd staging of the Railway Cup since its establishment by the Gaelic Athletic Association in 1927. The cup began on 11 March 1979 and ended on 1 April 1979.

Munster were the defending champions, however, they were defeated by Connacht in the semi-final.

On 1 April 1979, Leinster won the cup following a 1-13 to 1-09 defeat of Connacht in the final. This was their 18th Railway Cup title overall and their first title since 1977.

== Results ==
Semi-finals

11 March 1979 Semi-final	Connacht	4-09 - 2-07	Munster	Duggan Park, Ballinasloe
	Joe Connolly 2-1, John Connolly 1-3, F Gantley 1-0, PJ Molloy 0-3, N Lane 0-1, J Henry 0-1.		J McKenna 1-2, J Greene 1-0, T Cashman 0-2, J Callinan 0-1, L O'Donoghue 0-1, P O'Neill 0-1.	Referee: G Kirwan (Offaly)

11 March 1979 Semi-final	Leinster	1-19 - 0-11	Ulster	Croke Park, Dublin
	N Buggy 0-15, J Kelly 1-0, B Fitzpatrick 0-2, M Quigley 0-1, P Quirke 0-1.		E Donnelly 0-4, B Mullan 0-3, J Hughes 0-2, J Crossey 0-1, S Boyle 0-1.	Referee: J Brennan (Galway)

Final

1 April 1979 Final	Leinster	1-13 - 1-09	Connacht	Semple Stadium, Thurles
	N Buggy 0-6, T Doran 1-0, B Fitzpatrick 0-3, M Walsh 0-2, J Kelly 0-1, P Quirke 0-1.		John Connolly 1-4, J Henry 0-3, J Greaney 0-1, F Burke 0-1.	Referee: N O'Donoghue (Dublin)

== Scoring statistics ==
Top scorers overall

Rank	Player	Club	Tally	Total	Matches	Average
1	Ned Buggy	Leinster	0-21	21	2	10.50
2	John Connolly	Connacht	2-07	13	2	6.50
3	Joe Connolly	Connacht	2-01	7	2	3.50

== Bibliography ==
- Donegan, Des, The Complete Handbook of Gaelic Games (DBA Publications Limited, 2005).
