= 1977 Railway Cup Hurling Championship =

Irish hurling competition

- Dates: 13 February 1977 - 17 March 1977
- Teams: 4
- Champions: Leinster (17th title)
- Runners-up: Munster

Tournament statistics
- Matches played: 3
- Top scorer(s): Pat Moylan (0-13)

The 1977 Railway Cup Hurling Championship was the 51st staging of the Railway Cup since its establishment by the Gaelic Athletic Association in 1927. The cup began on 13 February 1977 and ended on 17 March 1977.

Munster were the defending champions.

On 17 March 1977, Leinster won the cup following a 2-17 to 1–13 defeat of Munster in the final. This was their 17th Railway Cup title overall and their first title since 1975.

== Results ==
Semifinals

13 February 1977 Semi-final	Leinster	1-12 - 2-05	Connacht	Enniscorthy
	E Keher 0-5, M Quigley 1-0, M Jacob 0-2, L O'Brien 0-2, M Brennan 0-2, M Ruth 0-1.		PJ Molloy 1-1, G Holland 1-0, Joe Connolly 0-2, M Connolly 0-1, V Mullins 0-1.	Referee: S O'Meara (Tipperary)

13 February 1977 Semi-final	Munster	3-17 - 3-06	Ulster	Croke Park, Dublin
	P Moylan 0-9, J Kehoe 1-3, P Moriarty 1-1, E Cregan 1-1, J Cullinan 0-2, L O'Donoghue 0-1.		E Donnelly 2-2, B Mullan 1-1, E Dornan 0-1, J Fagan 0-1, J McCormick 0-1.

Final

17 March 1977 Semi-final	Leinster	2-17 - 1-13	Munster	Croke Park, Dublin
	T Doran 1-3, E Keher 0-6, M Brennan 1-2, M Quigley 0-2, L O'Brien 0-1, M Ruth 0-1, C Doran 0-1, N Buggy 0-1.		N Casey 1-1, P Moylan 0-4, J Kehoe 0-3, J Horgan 0-2, D Coughlan 0-1, E O'Connor 0-1, J Cullinan 0-1.	Referee: G Kirwan (Offaly)

== Scoring statistics ==
Top scorers overall

Rank	Player	Club	Tally	Total	Matches	Average
1	Pat Moylan	Munster	0-13	13	2	6.50
2	Eddie Keher	Leinster	0-11	11	2	5.50
3	Jim Kehoe	Munster	1-06	9	2	4.50

== Bibliography ==
- Donegan, Des, The Complete Handbook of Gaelic Games (DBA Publications Limited, 2005).
