= Mick Spain =

Irish hurler and referee

Personal information
- Native name: Mícheál de Spáinn (Irish)
- Born: 1932 Kilcormac, County Offaly, Ireland
- Died: 5 February 2011 (aged 78) Kilcormac, County Offaly, Ireland
- Occupation: ESB employee

Sport
- Sport: Hurling
Club
- Years: Club
- Kilcormac–Killoughey
Club titles
- Offaly titles: 0
Inter-county*
| Years | County | Apps (scores) |
| 1954–1963 | Offaly | 8 (0–00) |
Inter-county titles
- Leinster titles: 0
- All-Irelands: 0
- NHL: 0
- *Inter County team apps and scores correct as of 23:15, 14 September 2014.

Mick Spain (1932 – 5 February 2011) was an Irish hurler who played at senior level for the Offaly county team.

Born in Kilcormac, County Offaly, Spain first arrived on the inter-county scene at the age of sixteen when he first linked up with the Offaly minor team before later joining the junior side. He made his senior debut during the 1954 championship. Spain went on to play a key role for Offaly but enjoyed little success.

At club level Spain had a lengthy career with Kilcormac–Killoughey.

Throughout his career Spain made 8 championship appearances for Offaly. His retirement came following the conclusion of the 1963 championship.

In retirement from playing Spain became involved in refereeing at club and inter-county levels.

Achievements
| Preceded by Clem Foley (Dublin) | All-Ireland MHC Final referee 1971 | Succeeded by John Moloney (Tipperary) |
| Preceded by Frank Murphy (Cork) | All-Ireland SHC Final referee 1972 | Succeeded by Mick Slattery (Clare) |
| Preceded by D. Guerin (Dublin) | All-Ireland Club SFC Final referee 1973-1974 | Succeeded by P. J. McGrath (Mayo) |
| Preceded by Dick Barry (Meath) | All-Ireland Under-21 FC Final referee 1973 | Succeeded by Gerry Hoey (Louth) |
| Preceded by Seán O'Connor (Limerick) | All-Ireland MHC Final referee 1974 | Succeeded by Jimmy Rankins (Laois) |
| Preceded by Paddy Johnston (Kilkenny) | All-Ireland Club SHC Final referee 1975 | Succeeded by Jimmy Rankins (Laois) |
