= Frank Norberg =

Irish hurler

Personal information
- Native name: Prionsias Norberg (Irish)
- Born: 1948 Blackrock Cork, Ireland
- Died: 20 February 2018 (aged 69–70) Passage West County Cork, Ireland
- Height: 5 ft 8 in (173 cm)

Sport
- Sport: Hurling
- Position: Right wing-back
Club
- Years: Club
- Blackrock
Club titles
- Cork titles: 5
- Munster titles: 4
- All-Ireland Titles: 3
Inter-county*
Years	County	Apps (scores)
1969–1973	Cork	5 (0–0)
Inter-county titles
- Munster titles: 1
- All-Irelands: 0
- NHL: 1
- All Stars: 0
- *Inter County team apps and scores correct as of 12:43, 8 April 2018 (aged 69).

Jeremiah Francis Norberg (1948 – 20 February 2018), known as Frank Norberg, was an Irish hurler. His league and championship career with the Cork senior team lasted four seasons from 1969 to 1973.

Born in Blackrock Cork, Norberg was raised in a strong hurling family. His grandfather, Jer Norberg, won an All-Ireland Senior Hurling Championship (SHC) medal with Cork in 1893.

Norberg first appeared for the Blackrock club at juvenile and underage levels, before eventually joining the club's senior team. In his career he won All-Ireland Club SHC medals in 1972, 1974 and 1979. Norberg also won four Munster Club SHC medal and five county championship medals.

Norberg made his debut on the inter-county scene when he was selected for the Cork minor team in 1966. He had one championship season with the minor team, in which he was an All-Ireland MHC runner-up. He subsequently joined the under-21 team, winning back-to-back All-Ireland U21HC medals in 1968 and 1969. By this stage Norberg was close to the Cork senior team, and he made his debut during the 1969 Oireachtas Cup. Over the course of the following four seasons he won one Munster SHC medal and one National League medal.

== Biography ==
Frank Norberg was born in Blackrock County Cork in 1948. The possessor of a most unusual surname, his ancestors settled in Ireland after leaving Sweden. Norberg was born into a family deeply associated with Cork hurling. His grandfather, Jer Norberg, won an All-Ireland SHC title with Cork in 1893.

== Playing career ==
=== Club ===
Norberg played his club hurling with Blackrock in Cork. He had some success at underage levels before winning his first senior county championship title in 1971. This started a great run of success for the club, as ‘the Rockies’ later added to this county win with a Munster Club SHC club title, as well as an All-Ireland Club SHC title. In 1973, Norberg won his second county medal with Blackrock. Again this win was converted into subsequent Munster and All-Ireland Club SHC honours. The success continued in 1975, with Norberg winning a third set of county and provincial honours with his club. 'The Rockies' narrowly missed out on a third All-Ireland Club SHC title after a defeat by James Stephens of Kilkenny. A fourth county medal followed for Norberg in 1978; however, he missed the club’s Munster and All-Ireland Club SHC victories. He won a fifth county medal in 1979 and later collected his fourth Munster Club SHC title.

=== Minor & under-21 ===
Norberg first came to prominence on the inter-county scene as a member of the Cork minor team in 1966. That year he had his first success when he secured a Munster MHC title following a 6–7 to 2–8 defeat of Galway. Cork later faced Wexford in the All-Ireland MHC final. After a thrilling 6–7 apiece draw, Norberg's side were narrowly defeated in the replay by 4–1 to 1–8.

Two years later in 1968, Norberg was a small member of the Cork under-21 team. He secured a Munster U21HC title in that grade following a 4–10 to 1–13 defeat of Tipperary. An All-Ireland U21HC final appearance soon followed, with Kilkenny providing the opposition. An entertaining followed which eventually saw Cork triumph by 1–18 to 5–9. The result provided Norberg with an All-Ireland U21HC title.

In 1969, Norberg was still eligible for the under-21 grade. He added a second Munster U21HC title to his collection that year, before lining out in a second consecutive All-Ireland U21HC final. Wexford were the opponent, and, after a high-scoring game, Cork emerged as the winner by 5–13 to 4–7. This was Norberg's second consecutive All-Ireland U21HC title.

=== Senior ===
Following his performances in the minor and under-21 grades Norberg joined the Cork senior hurling team in 1971. He was a non-playing substitute that year; however, Cork had little success in the championship.

In 1972, Norberg was appointed captain of Cork. After guiding his team to the National Hurling League title, Norberg later lined out in his first Munster SHC final. Clare were the opponent, and a rout took place as Cork recorded a huge 6–18 to 2–8 victory. It was Norberg's first Munster SHC winners’ medal. The game was not without incident as Norberg picked up a groin injury in that game and, for a time, it looked likely that his season was over. He missed Cork's subsequent victory over London in the All-Ireland SHC semi-final; however, he recovered in time to lead out his team against Kilkenny in the All-Ireland SHC final. With time running out, Cork were cruising to victory and led ‘the Cats’ by eight points. Norberg had to be substituted during the game due to injury; however, a victory seemed certain. A Kilkenny fight-back saw the team draw level with Cork and score a further seven points without reply to capture a 3–24 to 5–11 victory. It was a huge blow to a Cork team that seemed destined for victory.

The loss was a double blow as, on the same day, Kilkenny had also defeated the Cork minor team, where another Norberg – Frank's younger brother John – also represented Cork.

Norberg was relegated to the substitutes' bench again in 1973, before leaving the inter-county set-up at the end of the year.

Sporting positions
Preceded by Pat McDonnell	Cork Senior Hurling Captain; 1972	Succeeded by Denis Coughlan
