= 1970 Railway Cup Hurling Championship =

Irish hurling competition

1970 Railway Cup
- Dates: 8 February – 17 March 1970
- Teams: Connacht; Leinster; Munster; Ulster
- Champions: Munster (32nd title)

Tournament statistics
- Matches played: 3

The 1970 Railway Cup Hurling Championship was the 44th series of the hurling Railway Cup. ree matches were played between 8 February and 17 March 1970. It was contested by Connacht, Leinster, Munster and Ulster.

Munster were the winners for the third year in-a-row and for the 32nd occasion overall.

== Format ==
Preliminary round: (1 match) This was a single match between Connacht and Ulster, generally regarded as the two 'weakest' teams in the championship. One team was eliminated at this stage while the winning team advanced to the semi-final.

Semi-final: (1 match) This was a single match between the winners of the preliminary round and Munster. One team was eliminated at this stage while the winning team advanced to the final.

Final: (1 match) This winners of the semi-final and Leinster, who received a bye to this stage, contested this game.

== Results ==
=== Railway Cup ===
February 23
Preliminary round

| Connacht | 2–6 – 3–6 | Ulster |
|---|---|---|
| D. Coen (1–4), B. O'Connor (1–0), J. Connolly (0–1), P. Fahy (0–1). | | S. Richmond (2–1), P. McShane (1–0), B. Burns (0–3), E. Donnelly (0–1), A. McCallin (0–1). |

St. Jarlath's Park, Galway
Referee: M. Slattery (Clare)

February 22
Semi-final

| Munster | 6–14 – 3–6 | Ulster |
|---|---|---|
| W. Walsh (2–2), J. Doyle (1–5), P. Enright (1–3), R. Cummins (1–0), M. Keating (1–0), M. Roche (0–2), J. Cullinane (0–1), N. O'Dwyer (0–1). | | P. Braniff (1–1), E. Donnelly (1–1), P. Faloona (1–0), S. Burns (0–2), P. McShane (0–1), A. McAllin (0–1). |

Croke Park, Dublin
Referee: C. Foley (Dublin)

March 17
Final

| Munster | 2–15 – 0–9 | Leinster |
|---|---|---|
| J. Doyle (0–5), R. Cummins (1–1), N. O'Dwyer (1–1), M. Roche (0–3), M. Keating (0–2), W. Walsh (0–1), G. McCarthy (0–1), D. Clifford (0–1). | | E. Keher (0–7), P. Molloy (0–1), D. Hanniffy (0–1). |

Croke Park, Dublin
Referee: J. Moloney (Tipperary)

== Sources ==
- Donegan, Des, The Complete Handbook of Gaelic Games (DBA Publications Limited, 2005).
