= 1974 Railway Cup Hurling Championship =

Irish hurling competition

- Dates: 27 January 1974 - 18 March 1974
- Teams: 5
- Champions: Leinster (15th title)
- Runners-up: Munster

Tournament statistics
- Matches played: 4
- Goals scored: 22 (5.5 per match)
- Points scored: 80 (20 per match)

The 1974 Railway Cup Hurling Championship was the 48th staging of the Railway Cup since its establishment by the Gaelic Athletic Association in 1927. The cup began on 27 January 1974 and ended on 18 March 1974.

Leinster were the defending champions.

On 18 March 1974, Leinster won the cup following a 2-15 to 1-11 defeat of Munster in the final. This was their 15th Railway Cup title overall and their fourth title in succession.

== Results ==
Preliminary round

27 January 1974 Preliminary round	Combined Universities	4-10 - 2-07	Ulster	Croke Park, Dublin
	G O'Driscoll 1-1, J Spooner 1-1, N McInerney 0-3, S Ryan 1-0, P Quigley 1-0, P Fitzmaurice 0-2, J Callinan 0-2, J Buckley 0-1.		E Donnelly 1-3, W Richmond 1-1, M McKillop 0-2, P Barnniff 0-1.	Referee: C Foley (Dublin)

Semi-finals

17 February 1974 Semi-final	Munster	5-11 - 2-07	Combined Universities	Gaelic Grounds, Limerick
	N Rea 2-1, C McCarthy 1-3, F Nolan 1-1, É Grimes 1-1, F Loughnane 0-2, A Heffernan 0-1, S Foley 0-1, PJ Ryan 0-1.		P Fitzmaurice 1-3, S Ryan 1-0, H Dolan 0-3, J Callinan 0-1.	Referee: T Kelly (Galway)

17 February 1974 Semi-final	Leinster	3-13 - 3-06	Connacht	Nowlan Park, Kilkenny
	P Quigley 1-4, M Brennan 1-3, K Purcell 1-3, T Doran 0-1, L O'Brien 0-1, M Quigley 0-1.		J Connolly 1-3, J McDonagh 1-2, PJ Qualter 1-0, S Grealish 0-1, G Holland 0-1.	Referee: N Dalton (Waterford)

Final

18 March 1974 Final	Leinster	2-15 - 1-11	Munster	Croke Park, Dublin
	E Keher 1-7, K Purcell 0-4, P Quigley 1-0, M Quigley 0-2, C Kehoe 0-1, T Doran 0-1.		F Loughnane 1-4, É Grimes 0-3, G McCarthy 0-2, S Hogan 0-1, N Rea 0-1.	Referee: T Kelly (Galway)

== Scoring statistics ==
Top scorers in a single game

Rank	Player	Club	Tally	Total	Opposition
1	Eddie Keher	Leinster	1-07	10	Munster
2	Ned Rea	Munster	2-01	7	Universities
2	Pat Quigley	Leinster	1-04	7	Connacht
2	Francis Loughnane	Munster	1-04	7	Leinster
3	Eddie Donnelly	Ulster	1-03	6	Universities
3	Charlie McCarthy	Munster	1-03	6	Universities
3	Paudie Fitzmaurice	Universities	1-03	6	Munster
3	Mick Brennan	Leinster	1-03	6	Connacht
3	Kieran Purcell	Leinster	1-03	6	Connacht
3	John Connolly	Connacht	1-03	6	Leinster

== Bibliography ==
- Donegan, Des, The Complete Handbook of Gaelic Games (DBA Publications Limited, 2005).
