= Eddie Keher =

Irish hurler (born 1941)

Personal information
- Native name: Éamonn Ó Cathaoir (Irish)
- Born: 14 October 1941 (age 85) Inistioge, County Kilkenny, Ireland
- Occupation: Bank official
- Height: 6 ft 0 in (183 cm)

Sport
- Sport: Hurling
- Position: Corner-forward
Club
- Years: Club
- Rower–Inistioge
Club titles
- Kilkenny titles: 1
Inter-county*
Years	County	Apps (scores)
1959–1977	Kilkenny	50 (35–336)
Inter-county titles
- Leinster titles: 10
- All-Irelands: 6
- NHL: 3
- All Stars: 5
- *Inter County team apps and scores correct as of 05:55, 31 May 2017.

Edward Peter Keher (/ˈkɛər/; born 14 October 1941) is an Irish former hurler who played as a half-forward for the Kilkenny county team from 1959 to 1977.

Born in Inistioge, County Kilkenny, Keher first played competitive hurling whilst at school in St. Kieran's College. Aged 15, he represented the county minor team before making his senior debut in the 1959 championship. At senior level Keher won six All-Ireland medals, ten Leinster medals and three National Hurling League medals. He captained the team to All-Ireland victory in 1969 and was an All-Ireland runner-up on four occasions. As a member of the Leinster inter-provincial team for sixteen years, Keher won nine Railway Cup medals, a record for a Leinster player. At club level he won one championship medal with Rower–Inistioge.

Keher was voted on to teams made up of the sport's greats, including at corner-forward on the Hurling Team of the Century in 1984 and the Hurling Team of the Millennium in 2000. He won four Cú Chulainn awards and five successive All-Star awards, as well as being named Texaco Hurler of the Year in 1972. In 1972, he met and tutored Muhammad Ali in hurling during the latter's visit to Dublin. Keher made 50 championship appearances, a Kilkenny record which stood until July 2004. His retirement came following the conclusion of the 1977 championship. Keher's career record of 35 goals and 336 points stood until 20 June 2010.

In retirement from playing, Keher became involved in team management and coaching. As joint-coach to the Kilkenny senior team, he helped guide it to the All-Ireland title in 1979.

== Early life ==
Keher was born in Inistioge, County Kilkenny, a village he always wanted to return to in later life. His mother Noreen (née Browne) ran a newsagent's and general shop in the village square, while his father Stephen, from Donamon in County Roscommon, was a police sergeant stationed in nearby Ballyhale. He had an older sister, Eileen. While his father had played Gaelic football for Roscommon, there was no tradition of hurling in the family: as a very young boy Keher persuaded his mother to buy his first hurley after watching neighbouring boys playing out the back of their house. With other younger lads he played matches in the square between the "up streets" and "down streets" or between children from the village and the surrounding countryside, and learnt from older boys. Keher also played a little Gaelic football for a period and was a big fan of boxing through his father with whom he listened to radio broadcasts from America at all hours.

He attended the local national school in Inistioge. In 1952, 11-year-old Keher played for the school when it won the under-14 Roinn B championship. He added a second medal to his collection in 1955, when he was also named player of the match. Aged 12, Keher was sent as a boarder to St. Kieran's College, Kilkenny. After completing his Leaving Certificate, he went to Ross's College in Dublin where he studied to be a bank official. He subsequently worked in the Allied Irish Bank branches in St. Stephen's Green and Capel Street in Dublin. Keher trained with a few other Dublin-based Kilkenny panel members before big matches. He was later transferred to Kilkenny before becoming manager of the AIB branch in Callan, County Kilkenny.

== Playing career ==
=== Colleges ===
During his time at St. Kieran's the school came to the fore in underage hurling, twice winning the All-Ireland title and lifting the Leinster championship on three occasions. At that time his hero was Jim Langton of the 1947 All-Ireland team, with Sean Clohessy later earning his admiration.

In 1957, aged 15, he played in the college's 6–3 to 3–0 defeat of Patrician College, Ballyfin, in the provincial championship final, his first Leinster medal. On 28 April 1957, Keher scored three second-half goals and set up a fourth in a narrow 4–2 to 2–7 victory over St. Flannan's College, Ennis, in the All-Ireland decider to earn a first All-Ireland medal.

Keher added a second Leinster schools' medal in 1958 against Cistercian College, Roscrea.

In 1959 he was captain of the team and won a third Leinster medal after a walkover in the final. On 19 April 1959, a 2–13 to 4–2 victory over Abbey CBS, Tipperary, gave him a second All-Ireland medal.

=== Club ===
Keher played his club hurling with Rower–Inistioge. 1968 was his first senior championship final, against three-in-a-row hopefuls Bennettsbridge. A narrow 3–9 to 3–7 success earned Keher a Kilkenny Senior Hurling Championship medal. Keher regards this achievement as another career highlight, particularly since his club nominated him to be captain of the county team the following season. This "huge honour", as he called it, was made all the more special when he received the Liam MacCarthy Cup after Kilkenny's All-Ireland success the following September.

=== Minor ===
Keher was fifteen years old when called up to the Kilkenny minor team in 1956. He won a Leinster medal as an unused substitute that year, following a 4–7 to 3–7 defeat of Wexford.

In 1957 Keher added a second Leinster medal to his collection, as Offaly were defeated by 5–10 to 4–2. In the All-Ireland final against Tipperary, a replay of the previous year, Kilkenny lost again by 4–7 to 3–7.

Kilkenny retained their provincial crown in 1958, with Keher collecting a third Leinster medal following a 5–11 to 1–7 defeat of Laois.

1959 was his final year as a minor. A 7–9 to 3–4 defeat of Wexford gave Keher a fourth successive Leinster medal. For the third year in a row old rivals Tipperary provided the opposition in the All-Ireland final and prevailed narrowly by 2–8 to 2–7.

=== Senior ===
==== 1959–1964 ====
After impressing against Dublin in the Oireachtas Cup and Wexford in the Walsh Cup, Keher was picked for the senior panel in the All-Ireland final replay against Waterford on 4 October 1959. He came on after fifteen minutes for Johnny McGovern who was forced off with injury. Behind at half-time, Kilkenny scored only two points in the second half, from Keher, and lost 3–12 to 1–10.

In 1962 Keher captured his first silverware when Kilkenny defeated Cork to take their first National Hurling League in almost thirty years.

The following year Keher won his first Leinster medal following a 2–10 to 0–9 defeat of Dublin. In the All-Ireland final against Waterford on 1 September 1963, Keher scored no fewer than fourteen points and Kilkenny secured a 4–17 to 6–8 victory. This was his first All-Ireland medal, a win he considers "a magical moment to look back on". He later won his first Cú Chulainn award in the inaugural year of the scheme.

Keher won a second Leinster medal in 1964 when Dublin were defeated by 4–11 to 1–8 but on 6 September Kilkenny lost the All-Ireland final heavily to Tipperary (5–13 to 2–8). Keher later collected a second Cú Chulainn award that year.

==== 1965–1970 ====
After surrendering the provincial crown in 1965, Kilkenny reached the National league decider in 1966. An aggregate 10–15 to 2–15 defeat of New York gave Keher a second league medal. He later won a third Leinster title with a 1–15 to 2–6 defeat of Wexford. On 4 September 1966 Kilkenny faced Cork for the first time in nineteen years in an All-Ireland decider but lost by 3–9 to 1–10 victory. Keher later won a third Cú Chulainn award.

Keher's fourth Leinster medal came in 1967 following a 4–10 to 1–12 defeat of Wexford. On 3 September of that year, Keher was injured in the second half of the All-Ireland final but Kilkenny won by 3–8 to 2–7 to end a hoodoo against Tipperary dating back to 1922. This was Keher's second All-Ireland medal. He later won a fourth Cú Chulainn award.

While Wexford ended Kilkenny's hopes of retaining the provincial title in 1968, the latter won it back the following year with Keher, the team captain, lifting a fifth Leinster medal following a 3–9 to 0–16 defeat of Offaly in the final. On 7 September 1969, Kilkenny defeated Cork in the final by 2–15 to 2–9 to give Keher a third All-Ireland medal. The victory gave Keher a third All-Ireland medal.

==== 1971–1977 ====
Kilkenny won the Leinster title in 1971 with a 6–16 to 3–16 defeat of Wexford, Keher's sixth provincial medal. On 5 September 1971, Kilkenny faced Tipperary in the All-Ireland final, the first to be broadcast in colour by Telefís Éireann and the only eighty-minute meeting between the two sides. Keher set a new record by scoring 2–11 but the opposition prevailed by 5–17 to 5–14. Keher was later chosen on the inaugural All-Stars team of the year.

In 1972 Keher won a seventh Leinster medal following a replay victory over Wexford. Cork provided the opposition in the All-Ireland final on 3 September 1972 and led by eight points midway through the second half. From a sideline position, Keher pucked the sliotar as if going for a point but the ball dropped short, deceiving the Cork goalkeeper, and ended up in the back of the net. After scoring that goal Keher returned to his position with blood pouring out of a cut over his eye, having been hit by an opponent's hurley. Keher finished the game with a tally of 2–9 and collected his fourth All-Ireland medal following a 3–24 to 5–11 victory. For Keher, overhauling Cork in an "unbelievable" game during which the latter were well on top until near the end was another great memory. As well as collecting a second All-Star award, Keher was chosen as Texaco Hurler of the Year.

Keher added an eighth Leinster medal to his collection the following year after a 4–22 to 3–15 defeat of Wexford. Due to injury he missed Kilkenny's All-Ireland defeat by Limerick but collected a third All-Star award.

Kilkenny narrowly defeated by Kilkenny in the 1974 provincial decider with a high-scoring 6–13 to 2–24 victory, Keher's ninth Leinster medal. Limerick were the opponent's in the All-Ireland final on 1 September 1974 and led early on. A penalty by Keher helped his county to a 3–19 to 1–13 victory and earned him a fifth All-Ireland medal. He later won a fourth All-Star award.

Kilkenny made it five successive provincial titles in a row in 1975 with a 2–20 to 2–14 defeat of Wexford; this was Keher his tenth and final Leinster medal. On 7 September 1975, Keher lined out for a tenth All-Ireland final. Galway provided the opposition but were no match for Kilkenny, with Keher's tally of 2–7 helping his county to a 2–22 to 2–10 victory and earning him a sixth Celtic Cross. Keher later added a fifth successive All-Star award to his collection.

In 1976 Keher won a third National League medal after a heavy 6–14 to 1–14 defeat of Clare in a replay but Kilkenny conceded the provincial crown after a clear defeat by Wexford (2–20 to 1–6).

Aged 35, Keher played his last inter-county championship game on 24 July 1977, a narrow 3–17 to 3–14 defeat by Wexford.

=== Interprovincial ===
Keher represented Leinster in the Railway Cup over a seventeen-year span from 1961 to 1977. In 1964 he was part of the Leinster team that defeated Munster by 3–7 to 2–9 to gave him a Railway Cup medal. Keher collected a second Railway Cup medal the following year after a 3–11 to 0–9 defeat of Munster. He won a third Railway Cup medal in 1967, following a 2–14 to 3–5 defeat of Munster once again. From 1971 to 1975 Leinster secured five consecutive Railway Cup victories over Munster. A seventh win in 1977 took Keher's total to nine Railway Cup medals, a record for a Leinster player.

== Managerial career ==
Keher teamed up with Pat Henderson to take charge of the Kilkenny senior hurling team in 1979. In the provincial decider, Wexford were defeated by 2–21 to 2–17. In the All-Ireland final against Galway on 2 September 1979, Kilkenny secured a 2–12 to 1–8 victory to give Keher and Henderson All-Ireland victories as both player and coach.

In 1987 Keher took charge of Kilkenny team for one season. The county were exited the provincial championship at an early stage.

== Legacy ==
Fr. Tommy Maher, trainer of seven All-Ireland-winning Kilkenny teams, said of Keher in 1975: "At this stage, I must say Eddie Keher is the greatest I've seen. The second greatest was Christy Ring. Up until last year, perhaps, I would have reversed that order. But I have no doubt at all now, because Keher has done so much for the game, has played it so brilliantly, scores so brilliantly and at all times then a thorough gentleman – a credit to the game".

In 1984, the centenary year of the GAA, Keher received the high honour of being chosen at left corner-forward on the Hurling Team of the Century. Keher was selected as right corner-forward on the Hurling Team of the Millennium in 2000, while he was also named on a special Kilkenny Team of the Century.

In 2005 Keher was inducted into the Irish Independent/Jury's Ballsbridge Hotel Hall of Fame.

The following year Keher received an honorary degree of doctor of science from the University of Limerick. The university marked "the achievement of this remarkable hurling legend who is also well-known for his work with young people and in humanitarian causes".

Keher was the recipient of the 2009 Texaco Sportstars Hall of Fame Award.

In May 2020, the Irish Independent named Keher at number four in its "Top 20 hurlers in Ireland over the past 50 years".

Keher was the recipient of a lifetime achievement award from the Gaelic Players Association in 2017. He was awarded the Freedom of the City by Kilkenny County Council in 2018, of which he is very proud.

As of summer 2026 the people of Inistigue were arranging for a bronze statue of Keher to be erected at the local GAA pitch.

=== Views on hurling ===
Recalling great players beyond his native county, Keher once played against Christy Ring and spoke of his admiration for Nicky Rackard of Wexford and Jimmy Doyle of Tipperary. He also recalled Jimmy Barry-Murphy and Gerald McCarthy of the strong Cork teams of the 1960s and 1970s, as well as Éamonn Cregan and Pat Hartigan of Limerick.

Keher feels that moving the All-Ireland senior final to July has been a "big mistake" by taking hurling away from the prime parts of the year instead of showcasing it. For him, young people seeing their heroes in person or on TV is far more important than any form of coaching. He believes there is room for club hurling to take place during the summer months and not in late autumn or winter time.

In 2010 Keher was critical of Cork goalkeeper Donal Óg Cusack's autobiography, Come What May. After taking umbrage to the description of the Kilkenny team as the Stepford Wives of hurling, Keher insisted that if he had received the book as a Christmas present, it would have gone "straight in the bin".

Following the drawn All-Ireland final between Kilkenny and Galway in 2012, Keher became involved in a war-of-words with Joe Canning following the latter's comments about a lack of sportsmanship by Kilkenny player Henry Shefflin: "I think that's a very disappointing comment to make about probably one of the greatest hurlers to ever play the game, and a thorough gentleman at that. We'd hate in Kilkenny to have someone of the stature of Joe Canning making a remark like that".

'Scoring achievements'

Career scoring record: 211 goals, 1426 points (2059 points) in 298 games.

All-Ireland final: 7 goals and 74 points (95 points) in 10 games.

Leading annual scorer for 11 years between 1963 and 1976.

Personal best score in an All-Ireland final: 2-11 v Tipperary, 1971.

Best points tally in All-Ireland final: 14 points v Waterford, 1963.

== Personal life ==
Keher married his wife Kay in 1966. They have five children, 12 grandchildren (one of whom, Caoimhe Keher-Murtagh, plays camogie for Kilkenny; Keher's son Eamonn lives in Australia. Keher plays golf and considers family the greatest thing ever in his life.

He was a founder-member of the No Name Club, an organisation established in 1978 and devoted to providing alternative venues to public houses. Keher does not drink alcohol.

== Career statistics ==
=== Inter-county ===
Team	Year	National League			Leinster		All-Ireland		Total	
Team	Year	Division	Apps	Score	Apps	Score	Apps	Score	Apps	Score
Kilkenny	1958-59	Division 1A	—		—		1	0-02	1	0-02
Kilkenny	1959-60	Division 1A	5	5-10	2	1-09	—		7	6-19
Kilkenny	1960-61	Division 1A	3	4-04	1	1-03	—		4	5-07
Kilkenny	1961-62	Division 1B	4	2-23	2	1-07	—		6	3-30
Kilkenny	1962-63	Division 1B	4	2-17	2	2-11	1	0-14	7	4-42
Kilkenny	1963-64	Division 1A	4	3-25	2	0-05	1	0-02	7	3-32
Kilkenny	1964-65	Division 1A	6	3-17	2	1-09	—		8	4-26
Kilkenny	1965-66	Division 1A	4	3-20	2	0-15	1	0-07	7	3-42
Kilkenny	1966-67	Division 1A	7	6-48	2	3-12	1	0-03	10	9-63
Kilkenny	1967-68	Division 1A	6	2-34	2	1-10	—		8	3-44
Kilkenny	1968-69	Division 1A	5	5-13	2	1-15	2	0-20	9	6-48
Kilkenny	1969-70	Division 1A	5	4-30	2	1-11	—		7	5-41
Kilkenny	1970-71	Division 1A	8	2-55	2	2-18	2	2-25	12	6-98
Kilkenny	1971-72	Division 1A	9	5-56	3	4-21	2	2-26	14	11-103
Kilkenny	1972-73	Division 1A	5	3-33	2	2-21	0	0-00	7	5-54
Kilkenny	1973-74	Division 1A	6	1-27	2	4-11	2	1-24	10	6-62
Kilkenny	1974-75	Division 1A	6	3-32	2	2-16	1	2-07	9	7-55
Kilkenny	1975-76	Division 1A	11	11-59	2	2-05	—		13	13-64
Kilkenny	1976-77	Division 1A	4	1-15	2	2-06	—		6	3-21
Total			102	65-518	36	30-205	14	7-130	152	102-853

=== Inter-provincial ===
Team	Year	Railway Cup	
Team	Year	Apps	Score
Leinster	1961	1	0-02
Leinster	1962	—	
Leinster	1963	2	0-07
Leinster	1964	2	2-09
Leinster	1965	2	3-04
Leinster	1966	2	2-05
Leinster	1967	2	4-10
Leinster	1968	2	1-04
Leinster	1969	1	0-02
Leinster	1970	1	0-07
Leinster	1971	2	0-18
Leinster	1972	2	1-10
Leinster	1973	2	1-15
Leinster	1974	1	1-07
Leinster	1975	1	0-07
Leinster	1976	2	4-06
Leinster	1977	2	0-11
Total		27	19-124

== Honours ==
=== Team ===
==== Player ====
St. Kieran's College

- All-Ireland Colleges' Senior Hurling Championship (2): 1957, 1959 (c)
- Leinster Colleges' Senior Hurling Championship (3): 1957, 1958, 1959 (c)

Rower–Inistioge

- Kilkenny Senior Hurling Championship (1): 1968

Kilkenny

- All-Ireland Senior Hurling Championship (6): 1963, 1967, 1969 (c), 1972, 1974, 1975
- Leinster Senior Hurling Championship (10): 1963, 1964, 1966, 1967, 1969 (c), 1971, 1972, 1973, 1974, 1975
- National Hurling League (3): 1961–62, 1965–66, 1975–76
- Leinster Minor Hurling Championship (4): 1956 (sub), 1957, 1958, 1959

Leinster

- Railway Cup (9): 1964, 1965, 1967, 1971, 1972, 1973, 1974, 1975, 1977

==== Coach ====
Kilkenny

- All-Ireland Senior Hurling Championship (1): 1979
- Leinster Senior Hurling Championship (1): 1979

=== Individual ===
Honours

- Hurling Team of the Millennium: left corner-forward
- Hurling Team of the Century: right corner-forward
- Kilkenny Hurling Team of the Century: left corner-forward
- The 125 greatest stars of the GAA: no. 5
- Texaco Hurler of the Year: 1972
- All-Star Awards (5): 1971, 1972, 1973, 1974, 1975
- Cú Chulainn Awards (4): 1963, 1964, 1966, 1967
- GAA Hall of Fame inductee: 2013
- Scoring record: 211 goals 1426 points (2059 points) in 298 matches
- Leading annual scorer for 11 years, 1963 to 1976
- Awarded an Honorary Doctorate from the University of Limerick, 2006
- GPA Lifetime Achievement Award, 2017
- Freedom of the City by Kilkenny County Council, 2018

Sporting positions
Preceded by Jim Bennett	Kilkenny Senior Hurling Captain; 1969	Succeeded by Mick Crotty
Preceded by Pat Henderson	Kilkenny Senior Hurling Manager; 1987–1988	Succeeded by Dermot Healy
Achievements
Preceded by Dan Quigley (Wexford)	All-Ireland Senior Hurling Final winning captain 1969	Succeeded by Paddy Barry (Cork)
Preceded by Fr. Bertie Troy (Cork)	All-Ireland Senior Hurling Final winning coach (jointly with Pat Henderson); 1979	Succeeded by Cyril Farrell (Galway)
Awards
Preceded by Michael 'Babs' Keating (Tipperary)	Texaco Hurler of the Year; 1972	Succeeded by Éamonn Grimes (Limerick)
