= 1973 Railway Cup Hurling Championship =

Irish hurling competition

- Dates: 28 January 1973 - 17 March 1973
- Teams: 5
- Champions: Leinster (14th title)
- Runners-up: Munster

Tournament statistics
- Matches played: 4
- Goals scored: 19 (4.75 per match)
- Points scored: 80 (20 per match)
- Top scorer(s): Eddie Keher (1-15)

The 1973 Railway Cup Hurling Championship was the 47th staging of the Railway Cup since its establishment by the Gaelic Athletic Association in 1927. The cup began on 28 January 1973 and ended on 17 March 1973.

Leinster were the defending champions.

On 17 March 1973, Leinster won the cup following a 1-13 to 2-08 defeat of Munster in the final. This was their 14th Railway Cup title overall and their third title in succession.

Leinster's Eddie Keher was the championship's top scorer with 1-15.

== Results ==
Preliminary round

28 January 1973 Preliminary round	Combined Universities	6-13 - 1-07	Ulster	Croke Park, Dublin
	H O'Sullivan 3-0, J Spooner 1-3, G McCarthy 1-3, J Ryan 0-5, J Duggan 1-1, T Buckley 0-1.		W Richmond 1-0, A Hamill 0-3, B McGarry 0-2, S Collins 0-1, B Gilmore 0-1.

Semi-finals

18 February 1973 Semi-final	Leinster	4-13 - 0-09	Combined Universities	Croke Park, Dublin
	E Keher 1-8, T Doran 1-0, K Purcell 1-0, M Quigley 0-2, M Bermingham 0-1, F Cummins 0-1, P Delaney 0-1.		J Ryan 0-4, H O'Sullivan 0-2, J Callinan 0-1, G McCarthy 0-1, S Hogan 0-1.	Referee: N Dalton (Waterford)

18 February 1973 Semi-final	Munster	3-10 - 2-07	Connacht	Cork Athletic Grounds, Cork
	F Loughnane 0-6, S O'Leary 1-2, M Malone 1-0, S Greene 1-0, J Foley 0-1, J Flanagan 0-1.		A Fenton 1-1, D Furey 1-0, S Murphy 0-2, P Fahy 0-2, P Niland 0-1, T Cahalane 0-1.	Referee: J Rankins (Laois)

Final

17 March 1973 Final	Leinster	1-13 - 2-08	Munster	Croke Park, Dublin
	E Keher 0-7, M Bermingham 1-0, M Quigley 0-3, T Doran 0-1, K Purcell 0-1, P Delaney 0-1.		F Loughnane 1-2, N O'Dwyer 1-0, J Flanagan 0-2, L Gaynor 0-2, R Cummins 0-2.

== Bibliography ==
- Donegan, Des, The Complete Handbook of Gaelic Games (DBA Publications Limited, 2005).
