= 1975 Railway Cup Hurling Championship =

Irish hurling competition

- Dates: 16 February 1975 - 17 March 1975
- Teams: 4
- Champions: Leinster (16th title)
- Runners-up: Munster

Tournament statistics
- Matches played: 3
- Goals scored: 11 (3.67 per match)
- Points scored: 59 (19.67 per match)
- Top scorer(s): Francis Loughnane (1-10)

The 1975 Railway Cup Hurling Championship was the 49th staging of the Railway Cup since its establishment by the Gaelic Athletic Association in 1927. The cup began on 16 February 1975 and ended on 17 March 1975.

Leinster were the defending champions.

On 17 March 1975, Leinster won the cup following a 2-09 to 1–11 defeat of Munster in the final. This was their 16th Railway Cup title overall and their fifth title in succession.

== Results ==
Semifinals

16 February 1975 Semi-final	Munster	4-16 - 2-05	Ulster	Parnell Park, Dublin
	F Loughnane 1-7, J McKenna 2-0, J Kehoe 1-2, G McCarthy 0-3, J Cullinan 0-2, W Walsh 0-1, E O'Connor 0-1.		R McDonnell 1-1, M O'Flynn 1-0, S Collins 0-3, S Sands 0-1.	Attendance: 300; Referee: C Foley (Dublin)

16 February 1975 Semi-final	Connacht	1-07 - 1-11	Leinster	Duggan Park, Ballinasloe
	J Connolly 1-1, G Coone 0-2, P Fahy 0-1, PJ Molloy 0-1, F Burke 0-1, P Ryan 0-1.		T Doran 1-0, P Quigley 0-4, M Quigley 0-3, L O'Brien 0-1, P Delaney 0-1, M Brennan 0-1, J Quigley 0-1.	Referee: S O'Meara (Tipperary)

Final

17 March 1975 Final	Leinster	2-09 - 1-11	Munster	Croke Park, Dublin
	E Keher 0-7, J Quigley 1-1, T Doran 1-0, L O'Brien 0-1.		W Walsh 1-1, F Loughnane 0-3, S Hogan 0-2, G McCarthy 0-2, J Kehoe 0-1, N O'Dwyer 0-1, E O'Connor 0-1.	Referee: P Robinson (Galway)

== Scoring statistics ==
Top scorers overall

Rank	Player	Club	Tally	Total	Matches	Average
1	Francis Loughnane	Munster	1-10	13	2	6.50

Top scorers in a single game

Rank	Player	Club	Tally	Total	Opposition
1	Francis Loughnane	Munster	1-07	10	Ulster
2	Eddie Keher	Leinster	0-07	7	Munster
3	Joe McKenna	Munster	2-00	6	Ulster

== Bibliography ==
- Donegan, Des, The Complete Handbook of Gaelic Games (DBA Publications Limited, 2005).
