= 1974 All-Ireland Senior Hurling Championship =

Championship details
- Dates: 9 June – 1 September 1974
- Teams: 13

All-Ireland champions
- Winning team: Kilkenny (19th win)
- Captain: Nicky Orr

All-Ireland Finalists
- Losing team: Limerick
- Captain: Seán Foley

Provincial champions
- Munster: Limerick
- Leinster: Kilkenny
- Ulster: Not Played
- Connacht: Not Played

Championship statistics
- No. matches played: 12
- Player of the Year: Pat Henderson
- All-Star Team: See here

The All-Ireland Senior Hurling Championship of 1974 was the 88th staging of Ireland's premier hurling knock-out competition. Kilkenny won the championship, beating Limerick 3–19 to 1–13 in the final at Croke Park, Dublin.

== The championship ==
=== Format ===
Munster Championship

First round: (1 match) This is a single match between the first two teams drawn from the province of Munster. One team is eliminated at this stage while the winners advance to the semi-finals.

Semi-finals: (2 matches) The winner of the first round joins the other three Munster teams to make up the semi-final pairings. Two teams are eliminated at this stage while the winners advance to the final.

Final: (1 match) The winner of the two semi-finals contest this game. One team is eliminated at this stage while the winners advance to the All-Ireland final.

Leinster Championship

First round: (1 match) This is a single match between the first two teams drawn from the province of Leinster. One team is eliminated at this stage while the winners advance to the semi-finals.

Semi-finals: (2 matches) The winner of the first round joins the other three Leinster teams to make up the semi-final pairings. Two teams are eliminated at this stage while the winners advance to the final.

Final: (1 match) The winners of the two semi-finals contest this game. One team is eliminated at this stage while the winners advance to the All-Ireland semi-final.

All-Ireland Championship

Preliminary round: (1 match) This is a single match between Galway and the winners of the All-Ireland 'B' championship. One team is eliminated at this stage while the winners advance to the quarter-final.

Quarter-final: (1 match) This is a single match between London and the winners of the preliminary round. One team is eliminated at this stage while the winners advance to the semi-final.

Semi-final: (1 match) This is a single match between the Leinster champions and the winners of the quarter-final. One team is eliminated at this stage while the winners advance to the final.

Final: (1 match) The winners of the semi-final and the Munster champions contest this game.

== Fixtures ==
=== Leinster Senior Hurling Championship ===
June 9
First Round

Offaly	2–11 – 1–6	Dublin
M. Moylan (0–4), H. Dalton (1–0), J. Kinsella (1–0), M. Cleere (0–3), P. Mulhaire (0–2), P. Horan (0–2).		M. Bermingham (1–1), P. Quigley (0–4), D. Walsh (0–1).

O'Moore Park, Portlaoise
Referee: J. Rankin (Laois)

June 16
Semi-Final

Wexford	1–18 – 1–5	Laois
S. Kinsella (1–6), T. Byrne (0–3), P. Wilson (0–2), R. Kinsella (0–2), M. Quigley (0–2), John Quigley (0–1), D. Lawlor (0–1), C. Keogh (0–1).		P. Bates (1–4), G. Lanham (0–1).

Nowlan Park, Kilkenny
Referee: P. Johnston (Kilkenny)

June 30
Semi-Final

Kilkenny	4–14 – 2–6	Offaly
E. Keher (2–5), K. Purcell (1–1), P. Delaney (1–1), L. O'Brien (0–4), M. Brennan (0–2), P. Henderson (0–1).		J. Flaherty (1–4), P. J. Whelehan (1–0), K. Mooney (0–1), D. Hanniffy (0–1).

Croke Park, Dublin
Referee: M. Bowe (Wexford)

July 21
Final

Kilkenny	6–13 – 2–24	Wexford
E. Keher (2–6), M. Crotty (2–1), K. Purcell (1–1), P. Delaney (1–1), N. Brennan (0–1), M. Brennan (0–1), P. Henderson (0–1), L. O'Brien (0–1).		T. Byrne (1–8), J. Quigley (0–5), R. Kinsella (1–1), T. Doran (0–4), M. Casey (0–2), P. Wilson (0–2), S. Kinsella (0–1), T. O'Connor (0–1).

Croke Park, Dublin
Attendance: 20,742
Referee: M. Spain (Offaly)

=== Munster Senior Hurling Championship ===
May 19
First Round

Waterford	4–9 – 3–8	Cork
M. Geary (2–0), P. O'Grady (0–6), M. Ormonde (1–1), A. Reide (1–0), J. Kirwan (0–1), J. Galvin (0–1).		C. McCarthy (1–4), G. McCarthy (1–1), P. Hegarty (0–1), M. Malone (0–1), C. Roche (0–1).

Walsh Park, Waterford
Referee: S. O'Grady (Limerick)

June 30
Semi-Final

Limerick	3–12 – 3–11	Waterford
R. Bennis (1–6), L. O'Donoghue (1–1), E. Grimes (1–0), J. McKenna (0–2), M. Ruth (0–1), F. Nolan (0–1), N. Rea (0–1).		J. Kirwan (3–1), M. Whelan (0–2), A. Reide (0–2), P. O'Grady (0–2), M. Ormonde (0–1), M. Geary (0–1), M. Walsh (0–1), M. Hickey (0–1).

Semple Stadium, Thurles

July 7
Semi-Final

Clare	1–8 – 1–7	Tipperary
C. Honan (0–6), G. Lohan (1–0), M. Mooney (0–1), N. Casey (0–1).		F. Loughnane (1–4), J. Flanagan (0–1), P. Byrne (0–1), N. O'Dwyer (0–1).

Gaelic Grounds, Limerick
Referee: S. O'Connor (Limerick)

July 28
Final

Limerick	6–14 – 3–9	Clare
R. Bennis (2–8), N. Rea (2–0), L. O'Donoghue (0–4), F. Nolan (1–0), B. Hartigan (0–1), J. McKenna (0–1).		C. Honan (0–8), E. O'Connor (1–0), G. Lohan (1–0), T. Ryan (1–0), S. Stack (1–0, own goal), C. Woods (0–1).

Semple Stadium, Thurles
Attendance: 36,446
Referee: J. Moloney (Tipperary)

=== All-Ireland Senior Hurling Championship ===
July 7
Preliminary Round

Galway	3–19 – 4–10	Kildare
J. Connolly (0–6), P. J. Molloy (0–5), G. Holland (1–1), M. Barrett (1–0), P. Ryan (1–0), P. Fahy (0–2), I. Clarke (0–2), S. Murphy (0–2), G. Coone (0–1).		E. Walsh (1–5), J. Wall (1–1), J. O'Leary (1–1), Tommy Carew (1–0), B. Burke (0–2), J. O'Connell (0–1).

Athlone
Referee: S. O'Meara (Tipperary)

July 21
Quarter-Final

Galway	3–13 – 0–6	London
J. Connolly (2–4), P. Fahy (1–1), P. J. Molloy (0–5), M. Barrett (0–1), M. Bond (0–1), S. Murphy (0–1).		L. Corless (0–2), F. Canning (0–2), P. Cronin (0–1), R. Cashin (0–1).

Athlone
Referee: P. Johnston (Kilkenny)

August 4
Semi-Final

Kilkenny	2–32 – 3–17	Galway
E. Keher (0–13), P. Delaney (2–1), K. Purcell (0–5), L. O'Brien (0–4), M. Brennan (0–4), B. Fitzpatrick (0–2), F. Cummins (0–2), M. Crotty (0–1).		G. Coone (1–2), M. Barrett (1–2), P. J. Molloy (0–5), J. Rabbitte (1–0), S. Grealish (0–3), S. Murphy (0–2), P. Ryan (0–2), J. Connolly (0–1).

St. Brendan's Park, Birr
Referee: J. Moloney (Tipperary)

September 1
Final

Kilkenny	3–19 – 1–13	Limerick
E. Keher (1–11), M. Brennan (1–2), P. Delaney (1–0), K. Purcell (0–2), B. Fitzpatrick (0–1), P. Henderson (0–1), L. O'Brien (0–1), M. Crotty (0–1).		R. Bennis (0–5), L. O'Donoghue (1–0), N. Rea (0–3), J. McKenna (0–2), F. Nolan (0–1), M. Ruth (0–1), E. Grimes (0–1).

Croke Park, Dublin
Attendance: 62,071
Referee: J. Moloney (Tipperary)

Kilkenny	Limerick

== Championship statistics ==
=== Miscellaneous ===
- In the Munster final Clare's Seán Stack scores a remarkable own goal for Limerick.
- The All-Ireland 'B' champions were allowed to participate in the All-Ireland series for the first time. Kildare are the first team to benefit from this new format.
- In the All-Ireland quarter-final between Galway and London, brothers Michael and John Connolly line out for opposing teams.
- In the All-Ireland semi-final Kilkenny scored 2–32, it was one of the first times any team put more than thirty points over the bar.
- The All-Ireland final between Kilkenny and Limerick was attended by the Soviet Union ambassador to Ireland.

== Top scorers ==
=== Season ===
Rank	Player	County	Tally	Total	Matches	Average
1	Eddie Keher	Kilkenny	5–35	50	4	12.50
2	Richie Bennis	Limerick	3–19	28	3	9.33
3	Pat Delaney	Kilkenny	5-03	18	4	4.50
4	John Connolly	Galway	2–11	17	3	5.66
5	Kieran Purcell	Kilkenny	2-09	15	4	3.75
5	P. J. Molloy	Galway	0–15	15	3	5.00
6	Tom Byrne	Wexford	1–11	14	2	7.00
6	Colm Honan	Clare	0–14	14	2	7.00
7	Mick Brennan	Kilkenny	1-09	12	4	3.00
8	John Kirwan	Waterford	3-02	11	2	5.50
8	Liam O'Donoghue	Limerick	2-05	11	3	3.66

=== Single game ===
Rank	Player	County	Tally	Total	Opposition
1	Richie Bennis	Limerick	2-08	14	Clare
1	Eddie Keher	Kilkenny	1–11	14	Limerick
3	Eddie Keher	Kilkenny	0–13	13	Galway
4	Eddie Keher	Kilkenny	2-06	12	Wexford
5	Eddie Keher	Kilkenny	2-05	11	Offaly
5	Tom Byrne	Wexford	1-08	11	Kilkenny
7	John Kirwan	Waterford	3-01	10	Limerick
7	John Connolly	Galway	2-04	10	London
9	Seánie Kinsella	Wexford	1-06	9	Laois
9	Richie Bennis	Limerick	1-06	9	Waterford
