= 1975 All-Ireland Senior Hurling Championship =

Championship details
- Dates: 1 June – 7 September 1975
- Teams: 13

All-Ireland champions
- Winning team: Kilkenny (20th win)
- Captain: Billy Fitzpatrick

All-Ireland Finalists
- Losing team: Galway
- Captain: John Connolly

Provincial champions
- Munster: Cork
- Leinster: Kilkenny
- Ulster: Not Played
- Connacht: Not Played

Championship statistics
- No. matches played: 14
- Top Scorer: Eddie Keher (4–23)
- Player of the Year: Liam 'Chunky' O'Brien
- All-Star Team: See here

The All-Ireland Senior Hurling Championship of 1975 was the 89th staging of Ireland's premier hurling knock-out competition. Kilkenny won the championship, beating Galway 2–22 to 2–10 in the final at Croke Park, Dublin.

== Rule change ==
As a result of a decision taken at the Gaelic Athletic Association's (GAA) annual congress the previous year, as of 1975 all provincial finals, All-Ireland semi-finals and the All-Ireland final itself were reduced to 70 minutes playing time. Prior to this all championship matches were eighty minutes in duration for the past 5 years.

== The championship ==
=== Format ===
Munster Championship

First round: (1 match) This is a single match between the first two teams drawn from the province of Munster. One team is eliminated at this stage while the winners advance to the semi-finals.

Semi-finals: (2 matches) The winner of the first round joins the other three Munster teams to make up the semi-final pairings. Two teams are eliminated at this stage while the winners advance to the final.

Final: (1 match) The winner of the two semi-finals contest this game. One team is eliminated at this stage while the winners advance to the All-Ireland semi-final.

Leinster Championship

First round: (2 matches) These are two matches between the first four teams drawn from the province of Leinster. Two teams are eliminated at this stage while the winners advance to the semi-finals.

Semi-finals: (2 matches) The winners of the two first round games join the other two Leinster teams to make up the semi-final pairings. Two teams are eliminated at this stage while the winners advance to the final.

Final: (1 match) The winners of the two semi-finals contest this game. One team is eliminated at this stage while the winners advance to the All-Ireland semi-final.

All-Ireland Championship

Quarter-final: (1 match) This is a single match between Galway and the winners of the All-Ireland 'B' championship. One team is eliminated at this stage while the winners advance to the semi-final.

Semi-final: (1 match) This is a single match between the Munster champions and the winners of the quarter-final. One team is eliminated at this stage while the winners advance to the final.

Final: (1 match) The winners of the semi-final and the Leinster champions contest this game.

== Provincial championships ==
=== Leinster Senior Hurling Championship ===
June 1, 1975
First Round

Dublin	6–7 – 1–3	Laois
M. Bermingham (3–4), P. J. Holden (1–1), V. Holden (1–0), T. Grealish (1–0), R. Walsh (0–1), M. Reidy (0–1).		J. Kirwan (1–0), M. Mahon (0–1), M. Walsh (0–1), M. Dunphy (0–1).

Geraldine Park, Athy
Referee: N. Matthews (Waterford)

June 22, 1975
First Round

Offaly	6–6 – 4–12	Kildare
B. Moylan (4–4), P. Mulhaire (2–0), M. Cleere (0–2).		P. White (1–10), M. Moore (2–0), T. White (1–0), R. Burke (0–2).

O'Moore Park, Portlaoise
Referee: J. Rankins (Laois)

June 30, 1975
Semi-Final

Kilkenny	3–16 – 1–7	Dublin
E. Keher (1–8), L. O'Brien (1–0), M. Brennan (1–0), K. Purcell (0–3), M. Crotty (0–3), B. Fitzpatrick (0–1), B. Cody (0–1).		M. Bermingham (1–1), P. Quigley (0–4), T. Grealish (0–1), V. Holden (0–1).

Wexford Park, Wexford

July 7, 1975
First Round Replay

Offaly	1–14 – 0–11	Kildare
B. Moylan (0–9), J. Egan (1–0), M. Cleere (0–3), D. Hanniffy (0–1), P. Horan (0–1).		B. Burke (0–3), M. Moore (0–2), T. Guinan (0–1), J. O'Leary (0–1), Tony Carew (0–1), Tommy Carew (0–1), T. White (0–1), J. O'Connell (0–1).

Nowlan Park, Kilkenny
Referee: J. Rankins (Laois)

July 13, 1975
Semi-Final

Wexford	1–29 – 1–18	Offaly
S. Kinsella (1–8), M. Quigley (0–5), J. Quigley (0–4), T. Byrne (0–3), M. Casey (0–3), T. Doran (0–2), D. Bernie (0–2), C. Kehoe (0–1), C. Doran (0–1).		B. Moylan (0–9), G. Mooney (1–2), B. Coolahan (0–2), P. Horan (0–1), J. Kelly (0–1), M. Clarke (0–1), D. Hanniffy (0–1), P. Mulhaire (0–1).

Croke Park, Dublin
Referee: P. Johnston (Kilkenny)

August 3, 1975
Final

Kilkenny	2–20 – 2–14	Wexford
E. Keher (1–8), L. O'Brien (0–4), B. Fitzpatrick (0–3), M. Crotty (0–2), M. Brennan (0–1), K. Purcell (0–1), F. Cummins (0–1).		N. Buggy (1–7), T. Doran (1–0), M. Quigley (0–2), J. Murphy (0–2), C. Keogh (0–1), T. Byrne (0–1), M. Casey (0–1).

Croke Park, Dublin
Attendance: 26,228
Referee: J. Rankins (Laois)

=== Munster Senior Hurling Championship ===
June 8, 1975
First Round

Waterford	0–6 – 4–15	Cork
J. Galvin (0–2), M. Ormonde (0–2), P. O'Grady (0–1), A. Reide (0–1).		C. McCarthy (2–1), S. O'Leary (1–2), G. McCarthy (1–2), J. Barry-Murphy (0–5), E. O'Donoghue (0–2), R. Cummins (0–1), D. Allen (0–1), C. Roche (0–1).

Walsh Park, Waterford
Referee: J. O'Grady (Limerick)

June 29, 1975
Semi-Final

Cork	3–14 – 1–9	Clare
S. O'Leary (2–2), G. McCarthy (0–5), C. McCarthy (1–1), R. Cummins (0–3), D. Allen (0–2), J. Barry-Murphy (0–1).		T. Ryan (1–0), C. Honan (0–3), J. McNamara (0–3), M. Moroney (0–2), J. Callinan (0–1).

Gaelic Grounds, Limerick
Referee: J. O'Grady (Limerick)

July 6, 1975
Semi-Final

Tipperary	3–13 – 2–16	Limerick
M. Keating (2–3), F. Loughnane (1–3), J. Flanagan (0–3), S. Hogan (0–1), P. J. Ryan (0–1), F. Murphy (0–1), T. Butler (0–1).		R. Bennis (1–6), F. Nolan (0–4), G. Moloney (1–0), E. Grimes (0–3), L. O'Donoghue (0–2), J. Neenan (0–1).

Semple Stadium, Thurles
Attendance: 25,000
Referee: N. Dalton (Waterford)

July 20, 1975
Semi-Final Replay

Limerick	0–17 – 1–10	Tipperary
R. Bennis (0–9), L. O'Donoghue (0–2), E. Grimes (0–2), N. Rea (0–2), E. Cregan (0–1), J. McKenna (0–1).		J. Flanagan (0–6), F. Murphy (1–1), F. Loughnane (0–1), M. Keating (0–1), P. J. Ryan (0–1).

Gaelic Grounds, Limerick
Attendance: 32,000
Referee: N. Dalton (Waterford)

July 27, 1975
Final

Limerick	0–12 – 3–14	Cork
R. Bennis (0–6), E. Grimes (0–2), J. Meenan (0–1), F. Nolan (0–1), J. McKenna (0–1), L. O'Donoghue (0–1).		C. McCarthy (1–5), J. Barry-Murphy (1–2), W. Walsh (1–1), R. Cummins (0–3), D. Allen (0–2), S. O'Leary (0–1).

Gaelic Grounds, Limerick
Attendance: 46,851
Referee: J. Moloney (Tipperary)

== All-Ireland Senior Hurling Championship ==
=== All-Ireland quarter-finals ===
July 6, 1975
Quarter-Final

Westmeath	1–8 – 6–14	Galway
M. Flanagan (1–2), P. Jackson (1–0, own goal), P. Curran (0–2), J. Keary (0–1), E. Clarke (0–1), M. Carr (0–1), M. Fagan (0–1).		P. Fahy (2–0), P. J. Qualter (1–3), J. Connolly (1–3), M. Barrett (1–0), M. Connolly (0–3), P. J. Molloy (0–2), F. Burke (0–1).

Páirc Chiaráin, Athlone
Attendance: 7,000
Referee: M. Spain (Offaly)

=== All-Ireland semi-finals ===
August 17, 1975
Semi-Final

Galway	4–15 – 2–19	Cork
G. Coone (1–3), P. J. Qualter (1–2), J. Connolly (1–1), F. Burke (1–0), P. J. Molloy (0–3), P. Fahy (0–3), M. Connolly (0–3).		C. Roche (1–5), J. Barry-Murphy (1–1), S. O'Leary (0–4), G. McCarthy (0–3), C. McCarthy (0–2), E. O'Donoghue (0–1), R. Cummins (0–1), W. Walsh (0–1), D. Allen (0–1).

Croke Park, Dublin
Attendance: 27,020
Referee: M. Spain (Offaly)

=== All-Ireland final ===
September 7, 1975
Final

Kilkenny	2–22 – 2–10	Galway
E. Keher (2–7), L. O'Brien (0–5), M. Crotty (0–5), M. Brennan (0–2), P. Delaney (0–1), P. Henderson (0–1), F. Cummins (0–1).		G. Coone (0–6), F. Burke (1–0), P. J. Qualter (1–0), P. J. Molloy (0–3), J. Connolly (0–1).

Croke Park, Dublin
Attendance: 63,711
Referee: S. O'Connor (Limerick)

Kilkenny	Galway

== Championship statistics ==
=== Miscellaneous ===
- All championship games were reduced from eighty to seventy minutes.
- The All-Ireland semi-final saw Galway defeat Cork for the very first time in the history of the championship. It was also Cork's first-ever defeat in an All-Ireland semi-final.
- The All-Ireland final between Galway and Kilkenny was the first time that these two sides met at this stage of the championship.
- It was revealed after the All-Ireland final that Kilkenny's Liam 'Chunky' O'Brien had two teeth extracted on the day before the final and had to call a doctor to his home at 1 a.m. on the Sunday morning to stop a gum haemorrhage.

== Top scorers ==
=== Season ===
Rank	Player	County	Tally	Total	Matches	Average
1	Eddie Keher	Kilkenny	4–23	35	3	11.66
2	Barney Moylan	Offaly	4–22	34	3	11.33
3	Richie Bennis	Limerick	1–21	24	3	8.00
4	Charlie McCarthy	Cork	4–9	21	4	5.25
5	Seánie O'Leary	Cork	4–8	20	4	5.00
6	Mick Bermingham	Dublin	4–5	17	2	8.50
7	Jimmy Barry-Murphy	Cork	2–9	15	4	3.75
8	P. J. Qualter	Galway	3–5	14	3	4.66
9	Pat White	Kildare	1–10	13	2	6.50
10	Liam O'Brien	Kilkenny	1–9	12	3	4.00
10	Gerry Coone	Galway	1–9	12	3	4.00

=== Single game ===
Rank	Player	County	Tally	Total	Opposition
1	Barney Moylan	Offaly	4–4	16	Kildare
2	Mick Bermingham	Dublin	3–4	13	Laois
2	Eddie Keher	Kilkenny	2–7	13	Galway
2	Pat White	Kildare	1–10	13	Offaly
5	Eddie Keher	Kilkenny	1–8	11	Dublin
5	Seánie Kinsella	Wexford	1–8	11	Offaly
5	Eddie Keher	Kilkenny	1–8	11	Wexford
8	Ned Buggy	Wexford	1–7	10	Kilkenny
9	Michael 'Babs' Keating	Tipperary	2–3	9	Limerick
9	Richie Bennis	Limerick	1–6	9	Tipperary
9	Barney Moylan	Offaly	0–9	9	Kildare
9	Barney Moylan	Offaly	0–9	9	Wexford
9	Richie Bennis	Limerick	0–9	9	Tipperary

== Player facts ==
=== Debutantes ===
The following players made their début in the 1975 championship:

Player	Team	Date	Opposition	Game
Dinny Allen	Cork	June 8	Waterford	Munster quarter-final
Jimmy Barry-Murphy	Cork	June 8	Waterford	Munster quarter-final
