= 1972 All-Ireland Senior Hurling Championship =

Championship details
- Dates: 14 May – 3 September 1972
- Teams: 15

All-Ireland champions
- Winning team: Kilkenny (18th win)
- Captain: Noel Skehan

All-Ireland Finalists
- Losing team: Cork
- Captain: Frank Norberg

Provincial champions
- Munster: Cork
- Leinster: Kilkenny
- Ulster: Not Played
- Connacht: Not Played

Championship statistics
- No. matches played: 16
- Goals total: 111 (6.93 per game)
- Points total: 368 (23 per game)
- Player of the Year: Eddie Keher
- All-Star Team: See here

The All-Ireland Senior Hurling Championship of 1972 was the 85th staging of Ireland's premier hurling knock-out competition. Kilkenny won the championship, beating Cork 3–24 to 5–11 in the final at Croke Park, Dublin.

== Calendar ==
Round	Date
Leinster First Round	Saturday 14 May 1972
Munster First Round	Sunday 22 May 1972
Leinster Final	Sunday 9 July 1972
Munster Final	Sunday 30 July 1972
Leinster Final Replay	Sunday 30 July 1972
All-Ireland Quarter-Final	Sunday 23 July 1972
All-Ireland Semi-Finals	Sunday 6 August 1972
All-Ireland Final	Sunday 3 September 1972

== Format ==
=== Overview ===
The All-Ireland Senior Hurling Championship of 1972 was run on a provincial basis as usual. It was a knockout tournament with pairings drawn at random in the respective provinces – there were no seeds.

Each match was played as a single leg. If a match was drawn there was a replay. If that match ended in a draw a period of extra time was played, however, if both sides were still level at the end of extra time another replay had to take place.

=== Participating counties ===
Province	County	Most recent success	
Province	County	All-Ireland	Provincial
Leinster	Dublin	1938	1961
	Kildare		
	Kilkenny	1971	1969
	Laois	1915	1949
	Offaly		
	Westmeath		
	Wexford	1968	1970
Munster	Clare	1914	1932
	Cork	1970	1970
	Limerick	1940	1955
	Tipperary	1971	1971
	Waterford	1959	1963
Connacht	Galway	1923	1922
Ulster	Antrim		1946
Britain	London	1901	

=== The Championship ===
Munster Championship

Quarter-final: (1 match) This was a single match between the first two teams drawn from the province of Munster.

Semi-finals: (2 matches) The winner of the lone quarter-final joined the other three Munster teams to make up the semi-final pairings.

Final: (1 match) The winner of the two semi-finals contested this game.

Leinster Championship

First Round: (1 match) This was a single match between two of the 'weaker' teams drawn from the province of Leinster.

Quarter-finals: (2 matches) The winner of the first round game joined three other Leinster teams to make up the quarter-final pairings.

Semi-finals: (2 matches) The winners of the two quarter-finals joined Kilkenny and Wexford, who received a bye to this stage, to make up the semi-final pairings.

Final: (1 match) The winner of the two semi-finals contested this game.

All-Ireland Championship

Quarter-final: (1 match) This was a single match between Antrim and Galway, two teams who faced no competition in their respective provinces.

Semi-finals: (2 matches) The winner of the lone quarter-final joined London and the Munster and Leinster champions to make up the quarter-final pairings. The provincial champions were drawn in opposite semi-finals.

Final: (1 match) The winner of the two semi-finals contested this game.

== Fixtures ==
=== Leinster Senior Hurling Championship ===
May 14, 1972
First Round

Westmeath	1–7 – 0–8	Kildare
G. Connaughton (0–1), T. Ring (0–4), O. Boylan (1–0), C. Gavin (0–1), M. Flanagan (0–1).		T. Carew (0–2), P. Dunny (0–1), J. Walsh (0–3), M. Dwane (0–1), B. Burke (0–1).

O'Moore Park, Portlaoise
Referee: D. Fergusan (Meath)

June 4, 1972
Quarter-final

Laois	4–7 – 3–9	Offaly
P. Dillon (1–3), P. Dowling (0–1), D. Sheeran (0–2), G. Cuddy (1–0), G. Conroy (1–0), G. Lanham (0–1).		B. Cooloholan (0–1), D. Hanniffy (1–0), P.J. Conroy (1–1), P.J. Whelahan (0–2), J. Kirwan (1–5).

O'Moore Park, Portlaoise
Referee: D. Dooley (Dublin)

June 4, 1972
Quarter-final

Dublin	3–12 – 2–3	Westmeath
B. Cooney (0–1), W. Markey (0–1), D. Rhenisch (2–0), E. Flynn (1–8), M. Bermingham (0–2).		T. Ring (1–3), G. Gavin (1–0).

O'Moore Park, Portlaoise
Referee: J. Rankins (Laois)

June 18, 1972
Semi-final

Wexford	4–13 – 2–5	Dublin
C. Kehoe (0–2), M. Quigley (0–1), T. Doran (1–2), N. Buggy (1–3), J. Berry (1–2), D. Quigley (1–3).		H. Dalton (0–1), E. Flynn (1–3), V. Holden (1–0), M. Bermingham (0–1).

Nowlan Park, Kilkenny
Referee: M. Spain (Offaly)

June 25, 1972
Semi-final

Kilkenny	5–14 – 5–7	Laois
E. Keher (1–7), M. Brennan (2–2), M. Murphy (1–1), F. Cummins (1–0), J. Kinsella (0–2), M. Crotty (0–2).		P. Dillon (2–3), G. Lanham (2–2), G. Cuddy (1–0), F. Keenan (0–2).

O'Moore Park, Portlaoise
Referee: M. Spain (Offaly)

July 9, 1972
Final

Kilkenny	6–13 – 6–13	Wexford
E. Keher (2–5), M. Crotty (1–3), P. Delaney (1–1), K. Purcell (1–1), F. Cummins (1–0), L. O'Brien (0–1), J. Kinsella (0–1), M. Brennan (0–1).		M. Quigley (0–1), P. Wilson (0–1), C. Kehoe (1–3), T. Doran (1–2), N. Buggy (1–0), J. Berry (2–1), D. Quigley (1–4), J. Murphy (0–1).

Croke Park, Dublin
Referee: M. Spain (Offaly)

July 30, 1972
Final
Replay

Kilkenny	3–16 – 1–14	Wexford
E. Keher (1–8), P. Delaney (1–4), N. Byrne (1–0), J. Kinsella (0–2), P. Henderson (0–1), K. Purcell (0–1).		T. Doran (0–5), W. Murphy (0–2), M. Jacob (0–1), M. Quigley (0–1), P. Flynn (0–1), J. Berry (0–1), D. Quigley (0–4).

Croke Park, Dublin
Referee: M. Spain (Offaly)

=== Munster Senior Hurling Championship ===
May 22, 1972
Quarter-final

Cork	3–16 – 4–6	Waterford
C. McCarthy (0–8), D. Collins (1–1), R. Cummins (1–1), S. O'Leary (1–0), J. McCarthy (0–3), D. Coughlan (0–1), M. Malone (0–1), P. Hegarty (0–1).		S. Greene (1–0), P. Condy (1–0), J. Whelan (1–0), A. Heffernan (1–0), M. Hickey (0–2), J. Foley (0–2), J. Kirwan (0–1), M. Ormonde (0–1).

Cork Athletic Grounds, Cork
Referee: J. Maloney (Tipperary)

June 25, 1972
Semi-final

Cork	3–8 – 3–8	Tipperary
C. McCarthy (1–6), R. Cummins (1–1), S. O'Leary (1–0), M. Malone (0–1).		N. O'Dwyer (1–1), J. Flanagan (1–1), R. Ryan (1–1), M. Roche (0–1), L. Gaynor (0–1).

Gaelic Grounds, Limerick
Referee: S. O'Connor (Limerick)

July 2, 1972
Semi-final

Clare	3–11 – 2–10	Limerick
T. Ryan (0–7), N. Casey (1–2), M. Keane (1–0), G. Lohan (0–1), J. Cullinan (0–1), J. McNamara (1–0).		É. Cregan (1–0), É. Grimes (1–0), B. Hartigan (0–3), A. Dunworth (0–3), W. Moore (0–2), R. Bennis (0–2).

Cusack Park, Ennis
Referee: F. Murphy (Cork)

July 9, 1972
Semi-final
Replay

Cork	3–10 – 2–7	Tipperary
G. McCarthy (2–1), M. Malone (1–2), R. Cummins (0–3), C. McCarthy (0–2), C. Roche (0–1), S. O'Leary (0–1).		S. Hogan (1–0), M. Coen (1–0), E. Loughnane (0–2), J. Flanagan (0–2), N. O'Dwyer (0–2), M. Roche (0–1).

Gaelic Grounds, Limerick
Referee: S. O'Connor (Limerick)

July 30, 1972
Final

Cork	6–18 – 2–8	Clare
C. McCarthy (2–9), R. Cummins (2–1), S. O'Leary (2–1), G. McCarthy (0–3), J. McCarthy (0–1), D. Coughlan (0–1), M. Malone (0–1), P. Hegarty (0–1).		P. McNamara (2–1), J. Cullinan (0–2), J. O'Gorman (0–2), N. Casey (0–2), J. McNamara (0–1).

Semple Stadium, Thurles
Referee: S. O'Grady (Limerick)

=== All-Ireland Senior Hurling Championship ===
July 23, 1972
Quarter-Final

Galway	7–16 – 4–7	Antrim
T. Ryan (3–1), P. Fahy (0–10), B. O'Connor (1–2), J. Hughes (1–1), M. Greaney (1–0), S. Murphy (0–1), A. Fenlon (1–0), P. Niland (0–1).		E. Donnelly (2–3), S. Richmond (1–1), R. McDonnell (1–0), B. McGarry (0–2), A. Hamill (0–1).

Ballycastle GAA Field
Referee: P. Collins (Westmeath)

August 6, 1972
Semi-Final

Kilkenny	5–28 – 3–7	Galway
E. Keher (0–17), P. Delaney (2–5), L. O'Brien (1–1), K. Purcell (1–1), J. Kinsella (0–4), N. Byrne (1–0).		J. Hughes (2–1), P.J. Molloy (1–0), A. Fenlon (0–2), P. Niland (0–1), E. Murphy (0–1), P. Fahy (0–1), P. Mitchell (0–1).

Croke Park, Dublin
Referee: N. Dalton (Waterford)

August 6, 1972
Semi-Final

Cork	7–20 – 1–12	London
S. O'Leary (3–0), C. McCarthy (1–4), D. Collins (1–3), J. McCarthy (0–6), R. Cummins (1–1), P. Hegarty (1–0), M. Malone (0–2), C. Roche (0–2), S. Looney (0–1), T. O'Brien (0–1).		R. Cashin (0–6), T. Connolly (1–1), F. Canning (0–2), P. McDermott (0–1), M. Connors (0–1), A. Smith (0–1).

Cork Athletic Grounds, Cork
Referee: S. Maloney (Tipperary)

September 3, 1972
Final
15:15 IST

Kilkenny	3–24 – 5–11	Cork
E. Keher (2–9), L. O'Brien (0–5), F. Cummins (1–0), P. Delaney (0–3), K. Purcell (0–2), M. Crotty (0–2), P. Henderson (0–1), J. Kinsella (0–1), M. Murphy (0–1).		R. Cummins (2–3), M. Malone (2–1), S. O'Leary (1–1), C. McCarthy (0–4), C. Roche (0–2).

Croke Park, Dublin
Attendance: 66,137
Referee: Mick Spain (Offaly)

== Championship statistics ==
=== Scoring ===
- Widest winning margin: 27 points
  - Kilkenny 5–28 : 3–7 Galway (All-Ireland semi-final)
- Most goals in a match: 12
  - Kilkenny 6–13 : 6–13 Wexford (Leinster final)
- Most points in a match: 35
  - Kilkenny 3–24 : 5–11 Cork (All-Ireland final)
  - Kilkenny 5–28 : 3–7 Galway (All-Ireland semi-final)
- Most goals by one team in a match: 7
  - Galway 7–16 : 4–7 Antrim (All-Ireland quarter-final)
  - Cork 7–20 : 1–12 London (All-Ireland semi-final)
- Most goals scored by a losing team: 5
  - Cork 5–11 : 3–24 Kilkenny (All-Ireland final)
- Most points scored by a losing team: 14
  - Wexford 1–14 : 3–16 Kilkenny (Leinster final)

== Top scorers ==
=== Season ===
Rank	Player	County	Tally	Total	Matches	Average
1	Eddie Keher	Kilkenny	6–46	64	5	12.8
2	Charlie McCarthy	Cork	3–33	42	6	7.0
3	Ray Cummins	Cork	7–10	31	6	5.1
4	Seánie O'Leary	Cork	8–3	27	6	4.5
5	Pat Delaney	Kilkenny	4–13	25	5	5.0
6	Éamonn Flynn	Dublin	2–11	17	2	8.50
6	Dan Quigley	Wexford	2–11	17	3	5.66
8	Phil Dillon	Laois	3–6	15	2	7.50
8	Tony Doran	Wexford	2–9	15	3	5.00
10	Jimmy Hughes	Galway	3–2	11	2	5.60
10	Pádraic Fahy	Galway	0–11	11	2	5.60

=== Single game ===
Rank	Player	County	Tally	Total	Opposition
1	Eddie Keher	Kilkenny	0–17	17	Galway
2	Eddie Keher	Kilkenny	2–9	15	Cork
2	Charlie McCarthy	Cork	2–9	15	Clare
4	Eddie Keher	Kilkenny	2–5	11	Wexford
4	Eddie Keher	Kilkenny	1–8	11	Wexford
4	Pat Delaney	Kilkenny	2–5	11	Galway
7	Eddie Keher	Kilkenny	1–7	10	Laois
7	Tom Ryan	Galway	3–1	10	Antrim
9	Seánie O'Leary	Cork	3–0	9	London
9	Ray Cummins	Cork	2–3	9	Kilkenny
9	Eddie Donnelly	Antrim	2–3	9	Galway
9	Phil Dillon	Laois	2–3	9	Kilkenny

== Player facts ==
=== Debutantes ===
The following players made their début in the 1972 championship:

Player	Team	Date	Opposition	Game
Frank Norberg	Cork	May 22	Waterford	Munster semi-final

=== Retirees ===
The following players played their last game in the 1972 championship:

Player	Team	Date	Opposition	Game	Début
Frank Norberg	Cork	September 5	Kilkenny	All-Ireland final	1972

== Stadia ==
The following stadia were used during the championship:

County	Stadium
Antrim	Ballycastle GAA Field
Clare	Cusack Park
Cork	Cork Athletic Grounds
Dublin	Croke Park
Kilkenny	Nowlan Park
Laois	O'Moore Park
Limerick	Gaelic Grounds
Tipperary	Semple Stadium
