= Fennelly =

Fennelly is a surname. Notable people with the surname include:

- Aidan Fennelly (born 1981), Gaelic football player from Laois in Ireland
- Bill Fennelly (born 1957), the head women's basketball coach at Iowa State University
- Brendan Fennelly (born 1956), Irish former hurling manager and retired player
- Colin Fennelly (born 1989), Irish hurler
- Frank Fennelly (1860–1920), 19th-century Major League Baseball shortstop
- Ger Fennelly (born 1954), retired Irish sportsperson
- James Mathias Fennelly (1929–2000), Chairman of the Department of Philosophy, Professor of History of Religions at Adelphi University, New York
- Keeva Fennelly, camogie player and financial reporter
- Kevin Fennelly (born 1955), retired Irish hurling manager and former player
- Kevin Fennelly (senior), hurler from County Kilkenny
- Leann Fennelly, camogie player and a student, played in the 2009 All Ireland camogie final
- Liam Fennelly (born 1958), Irish retired sportsperson
- Mary Fennelly (1948–2025), Irish camogie player and administrator
- Michael Fennelly (hurler) (born 1985), Irish hurler
- Nial Fennelly (born 1942), judge of the Supreme Court of Ireland, Advocate General of the European Court of Justice from 1995 to 2000
- Parker Fennelly (1891–1988), American actor who appeared in ten films, numerous television episodes and hundreds of radio programs
- Seán Fennelly (born 1959), retired Irish sportsperson

== See also ==
- Fenella (disambiguation)
- Fennel
- Fennell
- Vennel
