= Fennel (disambiguation) =

Fennel is a species of plant, Foeniculum vulgare.

Fennel may also refer to:

== Plants ==
- Fennel, Foeniculum vulgare, a flowering plant species in the carrot family
- Giant fennel, Ferula communis, a flowering plant species in the carrot family
- Crithmum, also known as sea fennel, a genus of flowering plant with the sole species Crithmum maritimum, also known as samphire
- Nigella sativa, sometimes called "fennel flower", an annual flowering plant in the family Ranunculaceae, native to south and southwest Asia
- Caraway, also known as "meridian fennel", (Carum carvi), a biennial plant in the family Apiaceae, native to western Asia, Europe, and North Africa
- Dog fennel, which may refer to a number of species
- False fennel, which may refer to a number of species
- Giant Tangier fennel, Ferula tingitana, is a species of the Apiaceae genus Ferula
- Marsh hog's fennel, Peucedanum palustre ("milk-parsley"), a biennial plant in the family Apiaceae
- Hog's-fennel, Peucedanum officinale, a herbaceous perennial plant in the family Apiaceae found mainly in Central Europe and Southern Europe
- Fennel pondweed, Stuckenia pectinata, a cosmopolitan water plant species that grows in fresh and brackish water
- Giant hog fennel, Peucedanum verticillare, also known as Milk Parsley, a herbaceous plant in the genus Peucedanum of the family Apiaceae

== People ==
- Esther Fennel, (1981-), a German former racing cyclist
- Katja Fennel, an oceanographer
- Wallace Fennel, fictional character from the Veronica Mars TV series

== Other ==
- Operation Fennel, a contingency organisation for disruption of traffic across the English Channel
- HMCS Fennel, a Flower-class corvette that served with the Royal Canadian Navy during the Second World War
- Fennel, a programming language similar to Lisp; see Lua (programming language) § Derived languages
- Fennel, a Japanese e-sports clan

== See also ==
- Fennelly, a family name
- Fennell, a family name
- Fenella (disambiguation), a female name
