= Colin Fennelly =

Irish hurler (born 1989)

Personal information
- Native name: Cóilín Ó Fionnalaigh (Irish)
- Born: 25 August 1989 (age 37) Ballyhale, County Kilkenny, Ireland
- Occupation: Project Manager
- Height: 6 ft 2 in (188 cm)

Sport
- Sport: Hurling
- Position: Full-forward
Club*
Years	Club	Apps (scores)
2006-present	Ballyhale Shamrocks	90 (38-114)
Club titles
- Kilkenny titles: 12
- Leinster titles: 8
- All-Ireland Titles: 5
Inter-county**
Years	County	Apps (scores)
2011-2021	Kilkenny	50 (13-63)
Inter-county titles
- Leinster titles: 5
- All-Irelands: 4
- NHL: 3
- All Stars: 2
- * club appearances and scores correct as of 22:35, 4 December 2022. **Inter County team apps and scores correct as of 21:47, 14 November 2020.

Colin Fennelly (born 25 August 1989) is an Irish hurler who plays as a forward for Kilkenny Senior Championship club Ballyhale Shamrocks. He is a former captain of the Kilkenny senior hurling team.

Fennelly first appeared on the inter-county scene with the Kilkenny minor and under-21 teams, before establishing himself on the Kilkenny senior team, going on to make a combined total of 88 league and championship appearances across ten seasons. He won 12 trophies with Kilkenny; four All-Ireland titles, five Leinster Championships and three National Hurling League titles. Fennelly served as captain of the team for two seasons and is also a two-time All-Star.

Fennelly joined the Ballyhale Shamrocks senior team when he was 17 and has been a regular for the team since then. He has been one of the most prolific club goal-scorers of his era and has won a record five All-Ireland Club Championships. Fennelly has also won 10 County Championship titles.

Fennelly's uncles, Ger, Kevin and Liam, and his brother, Michael, have won twelve All-Ireland medals between them with Kilkenny.

== Playing career ==
=== Club ===
After much success at underage levels, including four successive under-21 championships, Fennelly quickly joined the Ballyhale Shamrocks senior team in 2006. That year he shared in his club's championship, Leinster and All-Ireland triumphs, however, Fennelly remained as an unused substitute.

Fennelly won a first championship medal on the field of play in 2007 following a 1–20 to 1-10 drubbing of St. Martin's.

Ballyhale Shamrocks made it three-in-a-row in 2008. A 2–11 to 0–12 defeat of James Stephens gave Fennelly a third successive championship medal, however, he was once again an unused sub as an injury ruled him out of the game. He later won his first Leinster medal on the field of play as the Shamrocks defeated reigning champions Birr by 2–13 to 1–11.

Fennelly won a fourth successive championship medal, his second on the field of play, in 2009, as Ballyhale claimed a record-equaling four-in-a-row following a 1–14 to 1–11 defeat of James Stephens once again. The subsequent provincial decider saw Ballyhale hit fifteen wides, however, Fennelly still collected a second Leinster medal following a 1–16 to 1–8 defeat of Tullamore. On 17 March 2010 Ballyhale faced three-in-a-row Portumna in a "dream" All-Ireland decider. The game failed to live up to the billing, however, 1–19 to 0–17 victory gave Fennelly his first All-Ireland medal on the field of play.

Five-in-a-row proved beyond Ballyhale Shamrocks, however, the team bounced back in 2012 having lost the championship decider the previous year. A far from vintage 0–16 to 0–12 defeat of Dicksboro gave Fennelly a third championship medal.

Fennelly won a fourth championship medal in 2014 as the Shamrocks claimed a 1–20 to 1–13 defeat of reigning champions Clara. Fennelly later collected a second Leinster medal as veteran Henry Shefflin proved the difference in a 0–21 to 1–14 defeat of Kilcormacv/Killoughey.

=== Minor and under-21 ===
Fennelly first came to prominence on the inter-county scene as a member of the Kilkenny minor team in 2006. He won his sole Leinster medal that year following a 4–22 to 1–5 defeat of Carlow.

By 2008 Fennelly had joined the under-21 team. He collected his first Leinster medal that year following a facile 2–21 to 2–9 defeat of Offaly. Old rivals Tipperary provided the opposition in the All-Ireland decider. Tipp whittled down a six-point half-time deficit to just two with minutes to go, however, Kilkenny hung on to win by 2–13 to 0–15, secure the Grand Slam of championship titles give Fennelly an All-Ireland Under-21 Hurling Championship medal.

Fennelly collected a second successive Leinster medal in 2009, as a brace of Jonjo Farrell goals helped Kilkenny to a 2–20 to 1–19 defeat of Dublin. Clare later faced Kilkenny in their first ever All-Ireland decider. A late point from midfielder Cormac O'Donovan gave Clare a narrow 0–15 to 0–14 victory.

=== Senior ===
Fennelly made his senior championship debut on 11 June 2011 in a 1–26 to 1-15 Leinster semi-final defeat of Wexford. A subsequent 4–17 to 1–15 defeat of Dublin gave "the Cats" a record-equalling seventh successive championship. It was Fennelly's first Leinster medal. Kilkenny subsequently faced Tipperary in a record-breaking sixth successive All-Ireland decider on 4 September 2011. Goals by Michael Fennelly and Richie Hogan in either half gave Kilkenny, who many viewed as the underdogs going into the game, a 2–17 to 1–16 victory. It was Fennelly's first All-Ireland medal.

2012 began well for Fennelly when he collected a first National Hurling League medal following a 3–21 to 0-16 demolition of old rivals Cork. Kilkenny were later shocked by Galway in the Leinster decider, losing by 2–21 to 2–11, however, both sides subsequently met in the All-Ireland decider on 9 September 2012. Kilkenny had led going into the final stretch, however, Joe Canning struck a stoppage time equaliser to level the game at 2–13 to 0-19 and send the final to a replay for the first time since 1959. The replay took place three weeks later on 30 September 2012. Galway stunned the reigning champions with two first-half goals, however, Kilkenny's championship debutant Walter Walsh gave a man of the match performance, claiming a 1-3 haul. The 3–22 to 3-11 Kilkenny victory gave Fennelly a second consecutive All-Ireland medal.

Kilkenny's dominance showed no sign of abating in 2013, with Fennelly winning a second league medal following a 2–17 to 0–20 defeat of Tipperary in the decider.

In 2014 Fennelly collected his third successive league medal, as Kilkenny secured a narrow one-point 2–25 to 1-27 extra-time victory over Tipperary. He missed much of the provincial campaign but was restored to the starting fifteen on 7 September 2014 when Kilkenny faced Tipperary in the All-Ireland decider. In what some consider to be the greatest game of all time, the sides were level when Tipperary were awarded a controversial free. John O'Dwyer had the chance to win the game, however, his late free drifted wide resulting in a draw. The replay on 27 September 2014 was also a close affair. Goals from brothers Richie and John Power inspired Kilkenny to a 2–17 to 2–14 victory. It was Fennelly's third All-Ireland medal. He was later presented with an All-Star award.

Fennelly won a third Leinster medal in 2015 following a 1–25 to 2–15 defeat of Galway in the provincial decider.

In January 2021, Fennelly informed manager Brian Cody that he would be opting out of the team for 2021 to re-charge his batteries.

In November 2021, Fennelly confirmed his retirement from inter-county hurling.

=== Inter-provincial ===
In 2012 Fennelly was an unused substitute on the Leinster team that faced Connacht in the inter-provincial final. The game was effectively over at half time, with Leinster powering to an eventual 2–19 to 1–15 victory.

In 2014 Fennelly was a member of the starting fifteen as Leinster faced Connacht in the Railway Cup decider once again. Just 150 spectators turned up to Croke Park as Leinster walloped Connacht for the third time in four finals by 1–23 to 0–16. It was Fennelly's first Railway Cup medal on the field of play.

== Personal life ==
Born in Ballyhale, County Kilkenny, Fennelly is the member of a hurling dynasty from the locality. His grandfather, Kevin Fennely, Snr, played with Kilkenny in the 1940s before later becoming heavily involved in the establishment of Ballyhale Shamrocks in 1972. His father, Mick, and his six uncles, Brendan, Ger, Kevin, Liam, Seán and Dermot, all played with the Shamrocks with several of them playing for Kilkenny at all levels.

Fennelly was educated at the local national school before later completing his Leaving Certificate at Scoil Aireagail. He subsequently completed a degree in construction management at the Cork Institute of Technology, before later becoming a member of the Irish Defence Forces.

== Career statistics ==
=== Club ===
As of 28 September 2024.

Team	Season	Kilkenny		Leinster		All-Ireland		Total	
Team	Season	Apps	Score	Apps	Score	Apps	Score	Apps	Score
Ballyhale Shamrocks	2006-07	2	0-00	1	0-00	1	0-00	4	0-00
Ballyhale Shamrocks	2007-08	3	0-03	2	0-00	—		5	0-03
Ballyhale Shamrocks	2008-09	3	0-03	3	0-01	1	0-02	7	0-06
Ballyhale Shamrocks	2009-10	3	0-09	3	1-03	2	0-03	8	1-15
Ballyhale Shamrocks	2010-11	2	0-02	—		—		2	0-02
Ballyhale Shamrocks	2011-12	5	2-06	—		—		5	2-06
Ballyhale Shamrocks	2012-13	3	1-08	1	1-01	—		4	2-09
Ballyhale Shamrocks	2013-14	2	2-04	—		—		2	2-04
Ballyhale Shamrocks	2014-15	3	2-05	2	0-02	2	1-04	7	3-11
Ballyhale Shamrocks	2015-16	3	1-03	—		—		3	1-03
Ballyhale Shamrocks	2016-17	3	0-06	—		—		3	0-06
Ballyhale Shamrocks	2017-18	4	2-06	—		—		4	2-06
Ballyhale Shamrocks	2018-19	4	1-03	2	4-06	2	2-04	8	7-13
Ballyhale Shamrocks	2019-20	4	1-03	3	2-00	1	2-01	8	5-04
Ballyhale Shamrocks	2020-21	4	4-07	—		—		4	4-07
Ballyhale Shamrocks	2021-22	4	2-04	3	3-01	2	0-02	9	5-07
Ballyhale Shamrocks	2022-23	4	1-06	3	3-06	2	0-03	9	4-15
Ballyhale Shamrocks	2023-24	4	2-04	—		—		4	2-04
Ballyhale Shamrocks	2024-25	2	1-00	—		—		2	1-00
Total		62	22-82	23	14-20	13	5-19	98	41-121

=== Inter-county ===
Team	Year	National League			Leinster		All-Ireland		Total	
Team	Year	Division	Apps	Score	Apps	Score	Apps	Score	Apps	Score
Kilkenny	2011	Division 1	7	4-05	2	1-01	2	0-04	11	5-10
Kilkenny	2012	Division 1A	7	2-13	2	0-00	3	2-03	12	4-16
Kilkenny	2013	Division 1A	7	1-07	3	0-02	3	0-05	13	1-14
Kilkenny	2014	Division 1A	7	4-14	4	2-12	3	0-08	14	6-34
Kilkenny	2015	Division 1A	1	0-03	1	0-02	2	0-02	4	0-07
Kilkenny	2016	Division 1A	5	3-05	2	0-01	3	2-02	10	5-08
Kilkenny	2017	Division 1A	4	0-00	1	1-00	2	0-01	7	1-01
Kilkenny	2018	Division 1A	0	0-00	6	1-06	1	0-02	7	1-08
Kilkenny	2019	Division 1A	0	0-00	5	1-06	3	2-05	8	3-11
Kilkenny	2020	Division 1B	0	0-00	2	1-01	0	0-00	2	1-01
Total			38	14-47	28	7-31	22	6-32	88	27-110

== Honours ==
=== Team ===
Ballyhale Shamrocks

- All-Ireland Senior Club Hurling Championship: 2007, 2010, 2015, 2019, 2020
- Leinster Senior Club Hurling Championship: 2006, 2008, 2009, 2014, 2018, 2019, 2021 (c), 2022
- Kilkenny Senior Hurling Championship: 2006, 2007, 2008, 2009, 2012, 2014, 2018, 2019, 2020, 2021 (c), 2022, 2025
- Kilkenny Under-21 Hurling Championship: 2003, 2004, 2005, 2006

Kilkenny

- All-Ireland Senior Hurling Championship: 2011, 2012, 2014, 2015
- Leinster Senior Hurling Championship: 2011, 2014, 2015, 2016, 2020 (c)
- National Hurling League: 2012, 2013, 2014
- All-Ireland Under-21 Hurling Championship: 2008
- Leinster Under-21 Hurling Championship: 2008, 2009
- Leinster Minor Hurling Championship: 2006

Leinster

- Railway Cup: 2012, 2014

=== Individual ===
Honours

- GAA-GPA All-Star Awards (2): 2014, 2019

Sporting positions
Preceded by Eoin Larkin	Kilkenny Senior Hurling Captain; 2013	Succeeded by Lester Ryan
Preceded by T. J. Reid	Kilkenny Senior Hurling Captain; 2020	Succeeded by Adrian Mullen
