= Nuala =

- Pronunciation: English: /ˈnuːlə/ NOO-lə; Irish: [ˈn̪ˠuəlˠə]
- Gender: Feminine

Origin
- Origin: Old Irish
- Meaning: Shoulder, lamb, born of the sea
- Region of origin: Ireland, Irish diaspora

Other names
- Related names: Úna, Fionnuala

Nuala (/ˈnuːlə/ NOO-lə, Irish: [ˈn̪ˠuəlˠə]) is an Irish feminine given name, derived from Irish mythology - being either a diminutive form of Fionnuala ("fair shoulder"), the daughter of Lir, or an alternate name for Úna (perhaps meaning "lamb"), wife of Finvarra, king of the fairies.

In modern Irish storytelling, Nuala means "born of the sea".

== People ==
- Nuala Ahern (born 1949), Irish politician
- Nuala Archer (born 1955), Irish American poet
- Nuala Butler, Irish judge
- Nuala Carey (born 1977), Irish weather presenter
- Nuala Considine (1927–2018), Irish crossword compiler
- Nuala Creed (born 1954), Irish sculptor
- Nuala Fennell (1935–2009), Irish economist and politician
- Nuala Gregory, Irish-New Zealand artist and academic
- Nuala Hafner (born 1976), Australian media personality
- Nuala Helsby, professor of molecular medicine and pathology
- Nuala Holloway (born c.1956), Irish artist, model and actress
- Nuala Kennedy (born 1977), Irish musician
- Nuala McAllister (born 1990), Northern Irish politician
- Nuala McGovern, Irish journalist, working for BBC News
- Nuala McKeever (born 1964), Northern Irish comic actress
- Nuala Ní Chonchúir (born 1970), Irish writer and poet
- Nuala Ní Conchobair (died 1226), Queen of Ulaid
- Nuala Ní Dhomhnaill (born 1952), Irish poet
- Nuala O'Donnell, 17th-century Irish figure who took part in the Flight of the Earls
- Nuala O'Faolain (1940–2008), Irish journalist and author
- Nuala O'Loan DBE (born 1951), Northern Irish public figure
- Nuala Quinn-Barton (born 1952), Irish model, artist and film producer
- Nuala Woulfe, Irish writer

== Characters ==
- Nuala Anne McGrail, the title character of the mystery novel series of the same name created by Andrew M. Greeley
- Nuala, a character in the comic book series The Sandman
- Princess Nuala, a character in the 2008 film Hellboy II: The Golden Army
- Nuala Magee, a character in the 2000 novel Touch Me by James Moloney
- Nuala, a character in Margaret Atwood's 2009 novel The Year of the Flood
- Nuala, twin to Cerridwen in the series A Court of Thorns and Roses by Sarah J Maas
- Nuala the Selkie, a character in the 1994 film The Secret of Roan Inish
- Nuala “Nunu” Carney, a character in The Ferryman, a 2017 play by Jez Butterworth
- Nuala, a character in The Missing Sister, a book by Lucinda Riley
- Nuala Windsor, a character in the 1999 film Eyes Wide Shut
- Nuala, Nuala, and Nuala, fictional members of the band The Nualas

== See also ==
- List of Irish-language given names
- Fenella (disambiguation)
