= List of ships named Fenella =

Fenella is the name of the following ships:

- SS Fenella (1881), a twin-screw Packet Steamer operated by the Isle of Man Steam Packet Company. Disposed of in 1929.
- SS Fenella (1936), a turbine steamer operated by the Isle of Man Steam Packet Company. Sunk during the Dunkirk Evacuation, 29 May 1940.
- MV Fenella (1951), a motor cargo vessel operated by the Isle of Man Steam Packet Company. Sold to Greek interests, subsequently caught fire and sank in the Mediterranean on 2 February 1977.
- MV Fenella (1986), a bulk cargo ship owned by Mineralien Schiffahrt Spedition & Transport Schnaittenbach, Germany

== See also ==
- Fenella (disambiguation)
