= Evan Shefflin =

Irish hurler (born 1999)

Personal information
- Native name: Éimhín Ó Sibhleáin (Irish)
- Born: 12 September 1999 (age 27) Ballyhale, County Kilkenny, Ireland
- Occupation: Student
- Height: 6 ft 1 in (185 cm)

Sport
- Sport: Hurling
- Position: Midfield
Club
- Years: Club
- 2017-present: Ballyhale Shamrocks
Club titles
- Kilkenny titles: 2
- Leinster titles: 2
- All-Ireland Titles: 2
College
- Years: College
- 2017-present: DCU Dóchas Éireann
College titles
- Fitzgibbon titles: 0
Inter-county*
Years	County	Apps (scores)
2019-	Kilkenny	0 (0-00)
Inter-county titles
- Leinster titles: 0
- All-Irelands: 0
- NHL: 0
- All Stars: 0
- *Inter County team apps and scores correct as of 10:11, 19 July 2019.

Evan Shefflin (born 12 September 1999) is a ginger Irish hurler who plays for Kilkenny Senior Championship club Ballyhale Shamrocks and at inter-county level with the Kilkenny under-21 hurling team. He usually lines out as a midfielder. He is a nephew of Henry Shefflin.

== Playing career ==
=== St. Kieran's College ===
In school, Shefflin played hurling with St. Kieran's College in Kilkenny, ultimately joining the college's senior hurling team. On 26 February 2017, he won a Leinster Colleges Championship medal after scoring a point from right wing-forward in a 1–14 to 0–13 defeat of Kilkenny CBS in the final. On 25 March 2017, Shefflin was switched to left corner-forward for the All-Ireland final against Our Lady's Secondary School from Templemore. He was held scoreless from play and ended the game on the losing side after a 3–13 to 3–11 defeat.

=== DCU Dóchas Éireann ===
As a student at Dublin City University, Shefflin became involved in hurling as a member of the university's freshers' team. He has since lined out in several Fitzgibbon Cup campaigns.

=== Ballyhale Shamrocks ===
Shefflin joined the Ballyhale Shamrocks club at a young age and played in all grades at juvenile and underage levels. He had championship success in the minor and under-21 grades, before eventually joining the club's top adult team in the Kilkenny Senior Championship.

On 28 October 2018, Shefflin lined out in his first senior final when Ballyhale Shamrocks faced Bennettsbridge. Playing at right wing-back, he ended the game with his first winners' medal after the 2–20 to 2–17 victory. Shefflin again lined out at right wing-back when Ballyhale qualified to play Ballyboden St. Enda's in the Leinster final on 2 December 2018. He scored a point from play and claimed his first Leinster Club Championship medal after a 2–21 to 0–11 victory. On 17 March 2019, Shefflin was again at right wing-back when Ballyhale qualified for an All-Ireland final meeting with St. Thomas's. He scored a point from play and claimed an All-Ireland Club Championship medal following the 2–28 to 2–11 victory.

On 27 October 2019, Holden lined out at full-back when Ballyhale Shamrocks faced James Stephens in the Kilkenny Championship final. He collected a sixth winners' medal after the 2–21 to 1–15 victory. On 1 December 2019, Holden again lined out at full-back when Ballyhale Shamrocks faced St. Mullin's in the Leinster final. He ended the game with a fifth winners' medal following the 1–21 to 0–15 victory. On 18 January 2020, Holden made his fourth All-Ireland final appearance when Ballyhale Shamrocks faced Borris-Ileigh. He ended the game with a fourth All-Ireland medal after the 0–18 to 0–15 victory.

=== Kilkenny ===
==== Minor and under-20 ====
Shefflin first lined out for Kilkenny as a member of the minor team during the 2017 Leinster Championship. On 2 July 2017, he was an unused substitute when Kilkenny defeated Dublin by 3–15 to 1–17 to win the Leinster Championship.

Shefflin was drafted onto the Kilkenny under-20 team in advance of the 2019 Leinster Championship and was appointed captain of the team. He made his first appearance for the team on 24 June 2019 when he scored three points from midfield in the 5–21 to 0–10 defeat of Laois. On 17 July 2019, Shefflin won a Leinster Championship medal after scoring 1-02 from midfield when Kilkenny defeated Wexford by 1–17 to 0–18 in the Leinster final.

==== Senior ====
Shefflin was drafted onto the Kilkenny senior team in advance of the 2019 Leinster Championship. On 30 June 2019, he was a member of the extended panel when Kilkenny suffered a 1–23 to 0–23 defeat by Wexford in the Leinster final. On 18 August 2019, Shefflin was again a member of the extended panel when Kilkenny lost out to Tipperary by 3–25 to 0–20 in the All-Ireland final.

== Career statistics ==
As of match played 18 August 2019.

Team	Year	National League			Leinster		All-Ireland		Total	
Team	Year	Division	Apps	Score	Apps	Score	Apps	Score	Apps	Score
Kilkenny Minor	2017	—			0	0-00	0	0-00	0	0-00
Kilkenny Minor	Total	—			0	0-00	0	0-00	0	0-00
Kilkenny U20	2019	—			3	1-05	—		3	1-05
Kilkenny U20	Total	—			3	1-05	—		3	1-05
Kilkenny	2019	Division 1A	—		0	0-00	0	0-00	0	0-00
Kilkenny	Total		—		0	0-00	0	0-00	0	0-00
Career total			—		3	1-05	0	0-00	3	1-05

== Honours ==
St. Kieran's College

- Leinster Colleges Senior Hurling Championship (1): 2017

DCU Dóchas Éireann

- All-Ireland Freshers' Hurling Championship (1): 2018

Ballyhale Shamrocks

- All-Ireland Senior Club Hurling Championship (2): 2019, 2020, 2023
- Leinster Senior Club Hurling Championship (2): 2018, 2019, 2021, 2022
- Kilkenny Senior Hurling Championship (2): 2018, 2019
- Kilkenny Under-21 Hurling Championship (2): 2017, 2018
- Kilkenny Minor Roinn A hurling Championship (1): 2016

Kilkenny

- Leinster Under-20 Hurling Championship (1): 2019 (c)
- Leinster Minor Hurling Championship (1): 2017
