= 1980–81 All-Ireland Senior Club Hurling Championship =

All-Ireland Senior Club Hurling Championship 1980–81
Championship Details
- Dates: 12 October 1980 – 17 May 1981
- Teams: 5

All Ireland Champions
- Winners: Ballyhale Shamrocks (1st win)
- Captain: Richie Reid

All Ireland Runners-up
- Runners-up: St. Finbarr's
- Captain: Bertie O'Brien

Provincial Champions
- Munster: St. Finbarr's
- Leinster: Ballyhale Shamrocks
- Ulster: McQuillan's
- Connacht: Sarsfield's

Championship Statistics
- Top Scorer: Brendan Fennelly (1–30)

The 1980–81 All-Ireland Senior Club Hurling Championship was the 11th season of the All-Ireland Senior Club Hurling Championship, the Gaelic Athletic Association's premier club hurling tournament. The championship ran from 12 October 1980 to 17 May 1981.

Castlegar of Galway were the defending champions, however, they failed to qualify after being beaten in the 1980 Galway SHC. Killeedy of Limerick and Tallow of Waterford made their championship debuts.

The All-Ireland final was played at Semple Stadium in Thurles on 17 May 1981, between St Finbarr's of Cork and Ballyhale Shamrocks of Kilkenny, in what was a first championship meeting between the teams. Ballyhale Shamrocks won the match by 1–15 to 1–11 to claim a first title.

Brendan Fennelly was the championship's top scorer with 1–30.

== Connacht Senior Club Hurling Championship ==
=== Connacht first round ===
12 October 1979 First round	Craobh Rua	2–04 – 2–07	Tooreen	Markievicz Park
			J Henry 2–6.

26 October 1979 First round	Tremane	9–09 – 3–06	St Mary's Kiltoghert	Athleague Sportsfield
	J Kilroy 6–1, M Keane 1–2, B Johnson 1–2, J Lynch 1–0, S Kilroy 0–3, J Coyne 0–1.		T McGrath 1–2, B Moran 1–0, T Cass 1–0, M Cunniffe 0–1, J McGrath 0–1, M Martin 0–1, O Moran 0–1.

=== Connacht semi-final ===
2 November 1979 Semi-final	Tremane	2–17 – 0–05	Tooreen	Athleague Sportsfield
	B Johnson 1–8, J Kilroy 1–5, M Keane 0–3, R Fallon 0–1.		M Murphy 0–2, J Henry 0–1, P Delaney 0–1, V Henry 0–1.

=== Connacht final ===
12 April 1981 Final	Tremane	0–05 – 4–12	Sarsfields	Athleague Sportsfield
	S Kilroy 0–4, R Fallon 0–1.		Matt Conneely 3–0, M Mulkerrins 0–7, J Cooney 1–2, J Dolan 0–1, T Shea 0–1, N Morrissey 0–1.

== Leinster Senior Club Hurling Championship ==
=== Leinster first round ===
19 October 1980 First round	Killyon	1–06 – 2–07	Carnew Emmets	St Loman's Park
	O Carney 1–1, PJ McKeown 0–2, B Dixon 0–1, J Connolly 0–1, J Mitchell 0–1.		B Molloy 1–1, L Collins 1–0, T Sullivan 0–2, S Brennan 0–2, P Doyle 0–1, M Doyle 0–1.

19 October 1980 First round	Ringtown	2–14 – 3–07	Carlow Town	Delvin Grounds
	M Kilcoyne 1–7, D Kilcoyne 0–4, JJ Mulvey 1–0, C Brssil 0–1, N Murphy 0–1, P Kilcoyne 0–1.		P Cassin 1–5, R Moore 1–1, L McGough 1–0, R Nolan 0–1.

=== Leinster quarter-finals ===
1 November 1980 Quarter-final	Ardclough	3–13 – 3–09	Camross	Naas Grounds
	J Walsh 2–7, N Walsh 0–4, B Maguire 1–0, J Tompkins 0–1, D Maguire 0–1.		PJ Cuddy 1–2, Martin Cuddy 1–1, M Collier 1–1, G Cuddy 0–2, Mick Cuddy 0–1, M Delaney 0–1.

2 November 1980 Quarter-final	Ringtown	1–12 – 1–15	Rathnure	Delvin Grounds
	J Coffey 1–0, M Kiloyne 0–3, D Kilcoyne 0–2, P Kilcoyne 0–2, C Brassil 0–2, N Murphy 0–1, T Corrigan 0–1, MJ Corrigan 0–1.		J Quigley 0–6, P Codd 1–1, J Mulvey 0–3, J Houlihan 0–2, D Quigley 0–1, J Murphy 0–1, S Redmond 0–1.

8 November 1980 Quarter-final	Ballyhale Shamrocks	2–15 – 0–09	St Brendan's	Nowlan Park
	L Fennelly 1–2, B Fennelly 0–4, P Holden 1–0, S Grace 0–3, G Fennelly 0–2, S Reid 0–2, M Mason 0–1, M Kelly 0–1.		M Gorman 0–5, G Hayes 0–2, M Barrett 0–1, J Bermingham 0–1.

16 November 1980 Quarter-final	Carnew Emmets	2–07 – 3–11	Coolderry	Aughrim County Ground
	S Brennan 1–3, T Collins 1–1, M Doyle 0–2, T Sullivan 0–1.		M Kennedy 2–4, O Kennedy 1–3, D Loughnane 0–2, P McLoughney 0–1, M King 0–1.

=== Leinster semi-finals ===
16 November 1980 Semi-final	Coolderry	2–05 – 1–07	Ardclough	O'Moore Park
	D Loughnane 1–3, S Kennedy 1–0, P McLoughney 0–1, M Kennedy 0–1.		J Walsh 0–5, E Walsh 1–1, N O'Sullivan 0–1.

16 November 1980 Semi-final	Ballyhale Shamrocks	3–09 – 2–12	Rathnure	Dr Cullen Park
	G Fennelly 0–5, S Grace 1–1, P Holden 1–1, B Fennelly 1–0, M Kelly 0–2.		J Quigley 0–10, P Codd 2–1, J Houlihan 0–1.

30 November 1980 Semi-final replay	Ballyhale Shamrocks	2–10 – 1–10	Rathnure	Geraldine Park
	L Fennelly 2–1, B Fennelly 0–6, G Fennelly 0–2, M Fennelly 0–1.		J Houlihan 1–1, D Quigley 0–4, J Quigley 0–3, S Murphy 0–1, M Quigley 0–1.

=== Leinster final ===
14 December 1980 Final	Ballyhale Shamrocks	3–10 – 1–08	Coolderry	Geraldine Park
	P Holden 2–1, B Fennelly 0–4, M Kelly 1–0, L Fennelly 0–2, G Fennelly 0–1, S Reid 0–1, S Grace 0–1.		D Loughnane 1–0, P Moloughney 0–3, P Carroll 0–2, O Kennedy 0–2, M King 0–1.

== Munster Senior Club Hurling Championship ==
=== Munster quarter-finals ===
19 October 1980 Quarter-final	St Finbarr's	1–19 – 0–07	Causeway	Páirc Uí Chaoimh
	J Cremin 0–10, T Masher 1–0, J Meyler 0–3, J O'Shea 0–2, M Kennedy 0–2, E Fitzpatrick 0–1, J Barry-Murphy 0–1.		J Regan 0–2, P Moriarty 0–2, R Hussey 0–1, M Burke 0–1, S Carroll 0–1.

19 October 1980 Quarter-final	Roscrea	1–10 – 1–07	Tallow	St Cronan's Park
	J Butler 1–2, F Loughnane 0–5, P Queally 0–1, J Stone 0–1, G O'Connor 0–1.		M Curley 1–0, R O'Brien 0–3, C Curley 0–2, K Ryan 0–1, P Daly 0–1.

=== Munster semi-finals ===
16 November 1980 Semi-final	Killeedy	3–07 – 3–14	St Finbarr's	Dromcollogher Sportsfield
	T Mulcahy 2–0, W Fitzmaurice 0–4, P Fitzmaurice 1–0, M Fitzmaurice 0–1, M Scanlon 0–1, D O'Connor 0–1.		C McCarthy 1–4, J Cremin 0–5, T Maher 1–0, J Barry-Murphy 1–0, E Fitzpatrick 0–3, J Meyler 0–1, N Kennefick 0–1.

16 November 1980 Semi-final	Newmarket-on-Fergus	2–08 – 2–10	Roscrea	Father Murphy Memorial Park
	J McNamara 2–0, S Liddy 0–5, C Woods 0–2, D Hayes 0–1.		L Spooner 0–4, F Loughnane 0–4, J Butler 1–0, M Shanahan 1–0, J Stone 0–1, K O'Connor 0–1.

=== Munster final ===
30 November 1980 Final	St Finbarr's	2–12 – 1–14	Roscrea	Páirc Mac Gearailt
	C McCarthy 0–6, J Barry-Murphy 1–2, E Fitzpatrick 1–0, J Cremin 0–2, C Ryan 0–1, N Kennefick 0–1.		G O'Connor 1–1, F Loughnane 0–4, K O'Connor 0–3, L Spooner 0–2, P Queally 0–2, J Stone 0–1, J Tynan 0–1.

== Ulster Senior Club Hurling Championship ==
=== Ulster semi-final ===
19 October 1980 Semi-final	Cúchulainns	2–04 – 3–13	Ballycastle McQuillans	Athletic Grounds
	J Corvan 1-3, J Devlin 1-0, E Donaldson 0-1.		E Donnelly 2-4, D Donnelly 0-3, T Barton 0-3, B Donnelly 0-1, L Rafferty 0-1.

=== Ulster final ===
26 October 1980 Final	Ballycran	0–13 – 1–20	Ballycastle McQuillans	McKenna Park
	B Gilmore 0–8, M O'Flynn 0–2, P Hughes 0–1, B Mullan 0–1, T Acheson 0–1.		P Boyle 0–12, B Donnelly 0–4, O Laverty 1–0, S Boyle 0–1, P Watson 0–1, C McVeigh 0–1, T Barton 0–1.

== All-Ireland Senior Club Hurling Championship ==
=== All-Ireland quarter-final ===
12 April 1981 Quarter-final	Ballycastle McQuillans	1–14 – 2–04	Brian Borus	Páirc Mac Uílín
	E Donnelly 1-5, B Donnelly 0-2, O Laverty 0-2, S Donnelly 0-2, D Donnelly 0-1, P Boyle 0-1, T Barton 0-1.		T Connolly 1-1, R Duggan 1-0, J Barrett 0-1, L Hogan 0-1, J Cronin 0-1.

=== All-Ireland semi-finals ===
26 April 1981 Semi-final	Ballycastle McQuillans	0–12 – 2–11	Ballyhale Shamrocks	Páirc Mac Uílín
	E Donnelly 0-3, P Boyle 0-3, B Donnelly 0-1, S Boyle 0-1, T Donnelly 0-1, D Donnelly 0-1, C McVeigh 0-1, O Laverty 0-1.		L Fennelly 2–0, B Fennelly 0–5, M Kelly 0–3, G Fennelly 0–1, P Holden 0–1.

26 April 1981 Semi-final	St Finbarr's	2–11 – 1–03	Sarsfield's	Páirc Uí Chaoimh
	J Allen 1–5, E Fitzpatrick 1–1, J Cremin 0–1, J Meyler 0–1, J Barry-Murphy 0–1, J O'Shea 0–1, C McCarthy 0–1.		Matt Conneely 1-1, J Cooney 0-2, M Mulkerins 0-1.

=== All-Ireland final ===
17 May 1981 Final	Ballyhale Shamrocks	1–15 – 1–11	St Finbarr's	Semple Stadium
	B Fennelly 0–11, L Fennelly 1–1, G Fennelly 0–3.		C McCarthy 0–5, J Barry-Murphy 1–0, J Cremin 0–2, T Maher 0–2, C Ryan 0–1, J Allen 0–1.	Referee: N O'Donoghue (Dublin)

== Championship statistics ==
=== Top scorers ===
Rank	Player	Club	Tally	Total	Matches	Average
1	Brendan Fennelly	Ballyhale Shamrocks	1–30	33	6	5.50
2	Jackie Kilroy	Tremane	7–06	27	3	9.00
3	Liam Fennelly	Ballyhale Shamrocks	6–06	24	6	4.00
4	John Cremin	St Finbarr's	0–20	20	5	4.00
5	Charlie McCarthy	St Finbarr's	1–16	19	4	4.75
5	John Quigley	Rathnure	0–19	19	3	6.33
7	Eddie Donnelly	Ballycastle McQuillans	3–12	21	4	5.25
8	Johnny Walsh	Ardclough	2–12	18	2	9.00
9	Basil Johnson	Tremane	2–10	16	3	5.33
9	Peter Boyle	Ballycastle McQuillans	0–16	16	3	5.33

=== Miscellaneous ===
- McQuillan's of Antrim become the first team to win three successive Ulster titles.
- Ballyhale Shamrocks win the All-Ireland title for the first time. In doing so they deny St. Finbarr's a unique double as their Gaelic footballers would later claim the All-Ireland title in that code.
