= Michael Fennelly (hurler) =

Kilkenny hurler (born 1985)

Personal information
- Native name: Micheál Ó Fionnalaigh (Irish)
- Born: 28 February 1985 (age 41) Ballyhale, County Kilkenny, Ireland
- Occupation: Lecturer
- Height: 6 ft 3 in (191 cm)

Sport
- Sport: Hurling
- Position: Midfield
Club
- Years: Club
- 2003–2020: Ballyhale Shamrocks
Club titles
- Kilkenny titles: 8
- Leinster titles: 6
- All-Ireland Titles: 5
College
- Years: College
- 2003–2007: Cork Institute of Technology
College titles
- Fitzgibbon titles: 0
Inter-county**
Years	County	Apps (scores)
2006–2017	Kilkenny	35 (1–31)
Inter-county titles
- Leinster titles: 9
- All-Irelands: 8
- NHL: 5
- All Stars: 3
- **Inter County team apps and scores correct as of 16:20, 3 December 2018.

Michael Fennelly (born 28 February 1985) is an Irish hurling manager and former player. His league and championship career at senior level with the Kilkenny county team lasted twelve seasons from 2006 until 2017. He managed the Offaly senior hurling team between 2019 and 2022.

Born in Ballyhale, County Kilkenny, Fennelly was brought up in a family that had a strong association with hurling. His grandfather, Kevin Fennelly Snr, played with Kilkenny in the 1940s, while his uncles - Brendan, Ger, Kevin, Jnr, Liam and Seán - all played for Kilkenny from the 1970s until the 1990s

Fennelly first played competitive hurling at juvenile and underage levels with the Ballyhale Shamrocks club. After much success in these grades he later won three All-Ireland medals with the club's senior team. He has also won four Leinster medals and six county senior championship medals.

Fennelly made his debut on the inter-county scene at the age of eighteen when he was selected for the Kilkenny minor team. He enjoyed one championship season with the minor team, culminating with an All-Ireland medal. Fennelly subsequently joined the Kilkenny under-21 team, winning All-Ireland medals in 2004 and 2006. By this stage he had also joined the Kilkenny senior team, making his debut during the 2006 league. Over the course of the next twelve seasons, Fennelly won eight All-Ireland medals, including a record-equalling four championships in-a-row from 2006 to 2009, followed by back-to-back triumphs in 2011 and 2012 and a final two championships in 2014 and 2015. The All-Ireland-winning captain of 2009, he was denied a ninth All-Ireland medal in September 2016. Fennelly also won nine Leinster medals, five National Hurling League medals and was named All-Star and Texaco Hurler of the Year in 2011. He was later joined on the Kilkenny team by his brother Colin. Fennelly announced his retirement from inter-county hurling on 29 December 2017 and from club hurling on 28 May 2020.

== Playing career ==
=== Club ===
After much success at underage levels, including four successive under-21 championships, Fennelly quickly joined the Ballyhale Shamrocks senior team. Two years later he was deployed further out the field as Ballyhale faced O'Loughlin Gaels in the senior decider. An impressive 1–22 to 2–11 victory gave Fennelly his first championship medal. He later added a Leinster medal to his collection when Ballyhale secured a comprehensive 1–20 to 1–8 defeat of Birr to take the provincial title for the first time in seventeen years. On 17 March 2007 Ballyhale Shamrocks faced Loughrea in the All-Ireland decider. On a day when Henry Shefflin and James "Cha" Fitzpatrick were held scoreless, the three Reid brothers contributed 3–7 from play. A 3–12 to 2–8 victory gave Fennelly an All-Ireland Senior Club Hurling Championship medal.

Fennelly added a second championship medal to his collection in 2007 following a 1–20 to 1–10 drubbing of St. Martin's.

Ballyhale Shamrocks made it three-in-a-row in 2008. A 2–11 to 0–12 defeat of James Stephens gave Fennelly a third successive championship medal. He later won a second Leinster medal as the Shamrocks defeated reigning champions Birr by 2–13 to 1–11.

Fennelly won a fourth successive championship medal in 2009, as Ballyhale claimed a record-equaling four-in-a-row following a 1–14 to 1–11 defeat of James Stephens once again. The subsequent provincial decider saw Ballyhale hit fifteen wides, however, Fennelly still collected a third Leinster medal following a 1–16 to 1–8 defeat of Tullamore. On 17 March 2010 Ballyhale faced three-in-a-row Portumna in a "dream" All-Ireland decider. The game failed to live up to the billing, however, 1–19 to 0–17 victory gave Fennelly a second All-Ireland medal.

Five-in-a-row proved beyond Ballyhale Shamrocks, however, the team bounced back in 2012 having lost the championship decider the previous year. A far from vintage 0–16 to 0–12 defeat of Dicksboro gave Fennelly a fifth championship medal.

Fennelly won a sixth championship medal in 2014 as the Shamrocks claimed a 1–20 to 1–13 defeat of reigning champions Clara. Fennelly later collected a fourth Leinster medal as veteran Henry Shefflin proved the difference in a 0–21 to 1–14 defeat of Kilcormacv/Killoughey. On 17 March 2015 Ballyhale faced Kilmallock in the All-Ireland decider. A complete mismatch saw Shamrocks win the game by 1–18 to 1–6, with Fennelly collecting a third All-Ireland medal.

=== Minor and under-21 ===
Fennelly first played for Kilkenny as a member of the minor team during the 2003 Leinster Championship. He made his first appearance for the team on 25 June 2003 when he lined out at midfield in a 4–12 to 0–11 defeat of Dublin. Fennelly was retained at midfield when Kilkenny qualified to play Offaly in the Leinster final on 6 July 2003. He was held scoreless throughout the game but ended with a winners' medal after an 0–18 to 0–13 victory. On 14 September 2003, Fennelly was again selected at midfield when Kilkenny faced Galway in the All-Ireland final. He was once again held scoreless but claimed an All-Ireland medal following the 2–16 to 2–15 victory.

Fennelly was just out of the minor grade when he was drafted onto the Kilkenny under-21 team before the 2004 Leinster Championship. He made his first appearance in the grade on 2 June 2004 in a 0–20 to 2–10 defeat of Laois. On 14 July 2004, Fennelly won a Leinster Championship medal after lining out at left corner-back in a 1–16 to 2–03 defeat of Wexford in the final. He retained his position at left corner-back when Kilkenny qualified for the All-Ireland final against Tipperary. Fennelly ended the game with a winners' medal following a 3–21 to 1–06 victory. It was Fennelly's first All-Ireland medal.

On 20 July 2005, Fennelly missed Kilkenny's 0–17 to 1–10 defeat of Dublin in the Leinster final due to a hand injury. He was back on the starting fifteen for the All-Ireland final against Galway on 18 September 2005, however, Fennelly ended the game on the losing side after a 1–15 to 1–14 defeat.

On 27 July 2006, Fennelly won a third successive Leinster Championship medal - his second on the field of play - after lining out at midfield in the 2–18 to 2–10 defeat of Dublin in the final. On 10 September 2006, he was again selected at midfield when Kilkenny drew 2-14 apiece with Tipperary in the All-Ireland final. Fennelly retained the midfield berth for the replay on 16 September 2006 and collected a second winners' medal after the 1–11 to 0–11 victory.

=== Senior ===
==== Beginnings ====
While still a member of the under-21 team, Fennelly was added to the Kilkenny senior panel in 2006. He made his debut during the National Hurling League, and subsequently collected his first winners' medal following a 3–11 to 0–14 victory over Limerick. On 2 July 2006 he made his senior championship debut in a facile 1–23 to 2–12 provincial final defeat of Wexford. It was his first Leinster medal. Fennelly later shared in Kilkenny's All-Ireland defeat of Cork as a non-playing substitute.

Fennelly collected a second Leinster medal in 2007, as Kilkenny asserted their provincial dominance and defeated Wexford by 2–24 to 1–12. On 2 September 2007 Kilkenny faced defeated Munster finalists and surprise All-Ireland semi-final winners Limerick in the championship decider. Kilkenny got off to a flying start with Eddie Brennan and Henry Shefflin scoring two goals within the first ten minutes to set the tone. Limerick launched a second-half comeback, however, "the Cats" were too powerful and cruised to a 2–19 to 1–15 victory. Fennelly, who started the game on the bench, came on to collect his first All-Ireland medal on the field of play.

==== On and off the team ====
In 2008 Fennelly broke his wrist in a club game which ruled him out of the latter stages of the provincial championship. He was back as an unused substitute as Kilkenny later claimed a third successive All-Ireland title following a 3–30 to 1–13 defeat of Waterford.

Fennelly was appointed captain of the team in 2009, however, he found it difficult to claim a place on the starting fifteen. On 6 September Kilkenny were poised to become the second team ever in the history of hurling to win four successive All-Ireland championships when they faced Tipperary in the decider. Fennelly, in spite of being captain, started the game on the bench before being introduced as a late substitute. For long periods Tipp looked the likely winners, however, late goals from Henry Shefflin and substitute Martin Comerford finally killed off their efforts to secure a 2–22 to 0–23 victory. Fennelly had collected his second All-Ireland medal on the field of play, while he also had the honour of lifting the Liam MacCarthy Cup.

In 2010 Kilkenny defeated Galway in an eagerly-anticipated but ultimately disappointing provincial decider. A 1–19 to 1–12 victory gave Fennelly a third Leinster medal. The drive for a fifth successive All-Ireland crown reached a head on 5 September 2010, when Kilkenny faced Tipperary in the All-Ireland decider. "The Cats" lost talisman Henry Shefflin due to injury, while Tipperary's Lar Corbett ran riot and scored a hat-trick of goals as Fennelly's side fell to a 4–17 to 1–18 defeat. In spite of this defeat, Fennelly later won his first All-Star award.

==== Continued dominance ====
Kilkenny's stranglehold in Leinster continued in 2011. A 4–17 to 1–15 defeat of Dublin gave "the Cats" a record-equalling seventh successive championship. It was Fennelly's fourth winners' medal overall. Kilkenny subsequently faced Tipperary in a record-breaking sixth successive All-Ireland decider on 4 September 2011. Goals by Fennelly and Richie Hogan in either half gave Kilkenny, who many viewed as the underdogs going into the game, a 2–17 to 1–16 victory. It was Fennelly's third All-Ireland medal, while he later collected a second consecutive All-Star and two Hurler of the Year accolades.

2012 began well for Fennelly when he collected a second league medal following a 3–21 to 0–16 demolition of old rivals Cork. Kilkenny were later shocked by Galway in the Leinster decider, losing by 2–21 to 2–11, however, both sides subsequently met in the All-Ireland decider on 9 September 2012. Kilkenny had led going into the final stretch, however, Joe Canning struck a stoppage time equaliser to level the game at 2–13 to 0–19 and send the final to a replay for the first time since 1959. The replay took place three weeks later on 30 September 2012. Galway stunned the reigning champions with two first-half goals, however, Kilkenny's championship debutant Walter Walsh gave a man of the match performance, claiming a 1–3 haul. The 3–22 to 3–11 Kilkenny victory gave Fennelly a fourth All-Ireland medal.

Kilkenny's dominance showed no sign of abating in 2013, Fennelly winning a third National League medal following a 2–17 to 0–20 defeat of Tipperary in the decider.

In 2014 Fennelly collected his fourth league medal, as Kilkenny secured a narrow one-point 2–25 to 1–27 extra-time victory over Tipperary. He missed much of the provincial campaign but was restored to the starting fifteen on 7 September 2014 when Kilkenny faced Tipperary in the All-Ireland decider. In what some consider to be the greatest game of all time, the sides were level when Tipperary were awarded a controversial free. John O'Dwyer had the chance to win the game, however, his late free drifted wide resulting in a draw. The replay on 27 September 2014 was also a close affair. Goals from brothers Richie and John Power inspired Kilkenny to a 2–17 to 2–14 victory. It was Fennelly's fifth All-Ireland medal.

An ongoing back injury hindered Fennelly's championship campaign in 2015, resulting in him missing Kilkenny's 1–25 to 2–15 defeat of Galway in the provincial decider. Fennelly fought his way back to full fitness as Kilkenny subsequently renewed their rivalry with Galway in the All-Ireland decider on 6 September 2015. The team struggled in the first half, however, a T. J. Reid goal and a dominant second half display, which limited Galway to just 1–4, saw Kilkenny power to a 1–22 to 1–18 victory. The victory gave Fennelly a sixth All-Ireland medal while he was also chosen as the man of the match.

On 13 August 2016, it was confirmed that Fennelly would miss the 2016 All-Ireland final after he ruptured his achilles tendon in the semi-final replay victory over Waterford.

In December 2017, Fennelly confirmed his retirement from Inter-County hurling. His last game was the 2017 qualifier defeat to Waterford on 8 July 2017

=== Inter-provincial ===
After a two-year hiatus and a period of uncertainty surrounding the competition, the Railway Cup returned in 2012 with Fennelly starting at midfield as Leinster faced Connacht in the decider. The game was effectively over at half time, with Leinster powering to an eventual 2–19 to 1–15 victory.

== Managerial career ==
=== Kildare (football coach) ===
In December 2018 it was announced that Fennelly had joined the Kildare senior football team's backroom team as their performance coach. Team manager Cian O'Neill defined his coaching role: "He will be working on those intangibles, like your team work, your coherence, resilience; he will be a great aid for me and the management team as regards to his observation role but most importantly for the players; he'll be there to observe them (players) when it matters mostly, at training and at matches giving feedback; one-on-ones; acting as a conduit between the players and management; it's a very broad role."

=== Offaly ===
On 27 August 2019, it was announced that Fennelly had been proposed to become the next manager of the Offaly senior hurling team. He was officially ratified for the position at a meeting of the Offaly County Board on 3 September 2019. Fennelly's backroom team included Michael Kavanagh, David Kenny and Johnny Kelly. On 30 November 2019, Fennelly took charge of the Offaly senior team for the first time when he guided the team to a 2–28 to 0–18 defeat of Kildare in the Kehoe Cup. On 12 January 2020, he claimed his first silverware when Offaly defeated Antrim by 1–16 to 1–15 to win the Kehoe Cup.

In July 2022, Fennelly left his position as Offaly manager after three seasons in charge.

== Personal life ==
Born in Ballyhale, County Kilkenny, Fennelly is the member of a hurling dynasty from the locality. His grandfather, Kevin Fennelly, Snr, played with Kilkenny in the 1940s before later becoming heavily involved in the establishment of Ballyhale Shamrocks in 1972. His father, Mick, and his six uncles, Brendan, Ger, Kevin, Liam, Seán and Dermot, all played with the Shamrocks with several of them playing for Kilkenny at all levels.

Fennelly was educated at the local national school before later completing his Leaving Certificate at Scoil Aireagail. He subsequently completed a degree in business studies at the Cork Institute of Technology, before later becoming a bank official with Ulster Bank.

In 2012 Fennelly left his banking job and completed a one-year MSC in Sports Performance at the University of Limerick. After a three-month internship with the Sydney Swans, Fennelly subsequently took a position as a lecturer with Setanta College. As of 2016, he was a lecturer in nutrition at Limerick Institute of Technology.

== Career statistics ==
=== Player ===
Team	Year	National League			Leinster		All-Ireland		Total	
Team	Year	Division	Apps	Score	Apps	Score	Apps	Score	Apps	Score
Kilkenny	2006	Division 1B	6	0-02	1	0-01	1	0-00	8	0-03
Kilkenny	2007	Division 1B	0	0-00	2	0-01	2	0-00	4	0-01
Kilkenny	2008	Division 1A	5	0-02	1	0-01	0	0-00	6	0-03
Kilkenny	2009	Division 1	4	0-03	1	0-00	1	0-01	6	0-04
Kilkenny	2010	Division 1	0	0-00	2	0-00	2	0-02	4	0-02
Kilkenny	2011	Division 1	6	1-07	2	0-02	2	1-03	10	2-12
Kilkenny	2012	Division 1A	6	0-03	0	0-00	3	0-03	9	0-06
Kilkenny	2013	Division 1A	3	2-04	0	0-00	2	0-03	5	2-07
Kilkenny	2014	Division 1A	1	0-03	1	0-01	3	0-05	5	0-09
Kilkenny	2015	Division 1A	1	0-01	1	0-01	2	0-03	4	0-05
Kilkenny	2016	Division 1A	1	0-02	2	0-03	2	0-01	5	0-06
Kilkenny	2017	Division 1A	0	0-00	0	0-00	2	0-00	2	0-00
Total			33	3-27	13	0-10	22	1-21	68	4-58

=== Manager ===
As of 3 July 2021

Managerial league-championship record by team and tenure
Team	From	To	Record				
Team	From	To	P	W	D	L	Win %
Offaly	27 August 2019	27 July 2022	13	10	1	2	76.9

== Honours ==
=== As a player ===
Ballyhale Shamrocks

- All-Ireland Senior Club Hurling Championship (5): 2007, 2010, 2015, 2019 (c), 2020 (c)
- Leinster Senior Club Hurling Championship (6): 2006, 2008, 2009, 2014, 2018 (c), 2019 (c)
- Kilkenny Senior Hurling Championship (8): 2006, 2007, 2008, 2009, 2012, 2014, 2018 (c), 2019 (c)
- Kilkenny Under-21 Hurling Championship (4): 2003, 2004, 2005, 2006

Kilkenny

- All-Ireland Senior Hurling Championship (8): 2006, 2007, 2008, 2009, 2011, 2012, 2014, 2015
- Leinster Senior Hurling Championship (9): 2006, 2007, 2008, 2009, 2010, 2011, 2014, 2015, 2016
- National Hurling League (5): 2006, 2009, 2012, 2013, 2014
- All-Ireland Under-21 Hurling Championship (2): 2004, 2006
- Leinster Under-21 Hurling Championship (3): 2004, 2005, 2006
- All-Ireland Minor Hurling Championship (1): 2003
- Leinster Minor Hurling Championship (1): 2003

Leinster

- Railway Cup (1): 2012

Awards

- GAA GPA All Stars Awards (3): 2010, 2011, 2015
- Hurler of the year 2011
- In May 2020, a public poll conducted by RTÉ.ie named Fennelly at midfield alongside Tommy Dunne in a team of hurlers who had won All Stars during the era of The Sunday Game.

=== As a manager ===
Offaly

- National League Division 2A: 2021
- Kehoe Cup: 2020
- Christy Ring Cup: 2021

== Miscellaneous ==
Upon retirement from playing, Fennelly became the player who has won the most All-Ireland winner's medals between club and county combined. In his collection he possesses sixteen All-Ireland medals: eight were won with the senior Kilkenny county team, five with his club Shamrocks Ballyhale, two with the Kilkenny under-21 hurling team and one with the Kilkenny minor hurling team.

Sporting positions
Preceded by Henry Shefflin	Kilkenny Senior Hurling Captain; 2009	Succeeded by Henry Shefflin
Preceded by Henry Shefflin	Kilkenny Senior Hurling Captain; 2009	Succeeded by T. J. Reid
Achievements
Preceded by Kenneth Burke	All-Ireland Under-21 Hurling Final winning captain 2006	Succeeded by Kevin Hynes
Preceded by James 'Cha' Fitzpatrick	All-Ireland SHC winning captain 2009	Succeeded by Eoin Kelly
Preceded by Paul Schutte	All-Ireland Club SHC winning captain 2019; 2020	Succeeded by Barry Coughlan
Awards
Preceded by Lar Corbett	GAA-GPA All-Star; Hurler of the Year; 2011	Succeeded by Henry Shefflin
Preceded by Lar Corbett	Texaco Hurler of the Year; 2011	Succeeded by Henry Shefflin
