= Fionnghuala =

Fionnghuala (reformed spelling: Fionnuala) is an Irish language feminine given name.

Fionnghuala was a highly popular woman's name in medieval Ireland. It continues to be used, as well as in the forms Fionnuala and Nuala. The meaning of Fionnghuala is 'fair-shouldered', which is interpreted as fair headed.

== Notable people ==
- Fionnghuala Ní Conchobhair, Princess of Connacht, died 1247.
- Fionnghuala Ní Briain, died 1282.
- Fionnghuala Ní Máel Sechnaill, Abbess of Meath, died 1286.
- Fionnghuala Ní Chonchobair, Abbess of Killcrevanty, died 1301.
- Fionnghuala Ní Choncobuir, died 1306.
- Fionnghuala Ní Conchobair, died 1335.
- Fionnghuala Ní Fhingin, died 1344.
- Fionnghuala Ní Mail Shechlainn, Queen of Breifne, died 1347.
- Fionnghuala Ní Cheallaigh, Lady of Clanricarde, died 1380.
- Fionnghuala Ní Chatháin, died 1381.
- Fionnghuala Ní Uidhir, died 1382.
- Fionnghuala Ní Conchobuir, died 1392.
- Fionnghuala Bean Uí Eaghra, died 1398.
- Fionnghuala Ní Madadhan, died 1398.
- Fionnghuala Bean Uí Suibne Fanad, died 1400.
- Fionnghuala Bean Uí Cellaigh, Queen of Uí Maine, died 1403.
- Fionnghuala Ní Ragnaill, died 1418.
- Fionnghuala Ní Dochartaigh, died 1440.
- Fionnghuala Níc in Airchideochain, died 1479.
- Fionnghuala Ní Diarmata Ruaidh, died 1489.
- Fionnghuala Ní Con Mara, died 1490.
- Fionnghuala Ní Conchubhair Fáilghe, died 1447.
- Fionnghuala Níc Uidhir, died 1496.
- Fionnghuala Ní Donnchada, died 1505.
- Fionnghuala Ní Briain, Queen of Tír Chonaill, died 1428.
- Fionnghuala Ní Craith, died 1531.
- Fionnghuala O'Reilly, born 1994, Irish model

== Other uses ==
- Fionnghuala (Dungeons & Dragons), a fictional deity
- Fionnghuala, a traditional Scottish Gaelic song that has been recorded by bands including The Bothy Band and Seo Linn.

== See also ==
- List of Irish-language given names
