= Aodh =

Aodh may refer to:

- Aodh (given name) (Old and Middle Irish spelling Áed), a masculine given name
- Aed (god), a god in Irish mythology
