= Kevin Fennelly Snr =

Kilkenny hurler

Kevin Fennelly
Personal information
- Native name: Caoimhín Ó Fionnalaigh (Irish)
- Born: County Kilkenny
- Occupation: Farmer

Sport
- Sport: Hurling
Club
- Years: Club
- Ballyhale Shamrocks
Inter-county
- Years: County
- 1940s: Kilkenny

Kevin Fennelly was a hurler from County Kilkenny who played for his local club Ballyhale Shamrocks and at senior level for the Kilkenny county team during the 1940s. After his playing days, Fennelly remained involved with his club Shamrocks, serving as trainer, chairman, treasurer and trustee. His contributions to the sport are commemorated in the form of the Kevin Fennelly Memorial Cup.

A farmer by trade, Fennelly purchased land in the town of Ballyhale along with his wife Theresa Hoyne in the early 1960s. It was here that he raised his family, and seven of his sons went on to play hurling for club and county - Michael, Seán, Ger, Kevin, Brendan, Liam and Dermot.
