= Darren Mullen =

Irish hurler

Personal information
- Native name: Darrin Ó Maoláin (Irish)
- Born: 7 January 1998 (age 28) Ballyhale, County Kilkenny, Ireland
- Occupation: Student
- Height: 5 ft 11 in (180 cm)

Sport
- Sport: Hurling
- Position: Left corner-back
Club
- Years: Club
- 2016-present: Ballyhale Shamrocks
Club titles
- Kilkenny titles: 2
- Leinster titles: 2
- All-Ireland Titles: 2
College
- Years: College
- DCU Dóchas Éireann
College titles
- Fitzgibbon titles: 0
Inter-county*
Years	County	Apps (scores)
2019-present	Kilkenny	0 (0-00)
Inter-county titles
- Leinster titles: 0
- All-Irelands: 0
- NHL: 0
- All Stars: 0
- *Inter County team apps and scores correct as of 17:49, 16 February 2020.

Darren Mullen (born 7 January 1998) is an Irish hurler who plays for Kilkenny Senior Championship club Ballyhale Shamrocks and at inter-county level with the Kilkenny senior hurling team. He usually lines out as a corner-back.

== Honours ==
St. Kieran's College

- All-Ireland Colleges Senior Hurling Championship (3): 2014, 2015, 2016
- Leinster Colleges Senior Hurling Championship (2): 2015, 2016

Ballyhale Shamrocks

- All-Ireland Senior Club Hurling Championship (2): 2019, 2020
- Leinster Senior Club Hurling Championship (2): 2018, 2019
- Kilkenny Senior Hurling Championship (2): 2018, 2019
- Kilkenny Under-21 Hurling Championship (2): 2017, 2018
- Kilkenny Minor Roinn A hurling Championship (1): 2016

Kilkenny

- Leinster Under-21 Hurling Championship (1): 2017
- All-Ireland Minor Hurling Championship (1): 2014
- Leinster Minor Hurling Championship (2): 2014, 2015
