= 2019–20 All-Ireland Senior Club Hurling Championship =

All-Ireland Senior Club Hurling Championship 2019–20
Championship Details
- Dates: 27 October 2019 – 19 January 2020
- Teams: 17

All Ireland Champions
- Winners: Ballyhale Shamrocks (8th win)
- Captain: Michael Fennelly
- Manager: Henry Shefflin

All Ireland Runners-up
- Runners-up: Borris–Ileigh
- Captain: Conor Kenny & Seán McCormack
- Manager: Johnny Kelly

Provincial Champions
- Munster: Borris–Ileigh
- Leinster: Ballyhale Shamrocks
- Ulster: Slaughtneil
- Connacht: Not Played

Championship Statistics
- Matches Played: 14
- Total Goals: 36 (2.57 per game)
- Total Points: 433 (30.92 per game)
- Top Scorer: T. J. Reid (2–53)

The 2019–20 All-Ireland Senior Club Hurling Championship was the 50th staging of the All-Ireland Senior Club Hurling Championship, the Gaelic Athletic Association's premier inter-county club hurling tournament. The competition began on 27 October 2019 and ended on 19 January 2020.

The defending champion was Ballyhale Shamrocks of Kilkenny.

Ballyhale Shamrocks defeated Borris–Ileigh by 0–18 to 0–15 in the final at Croke Park on 18 January 2020 to win the competition. This was the club's eighth title, as well as a second title in succession.

T. J. Reid of Ballyhale Shamrocks was the competition's top scorer, finishing with 2–53.

== Format ==
County Championships

The top hurling teams in Ireland's counties compete in their senior club championship. Each county decides the format for determining their county champions – it can be knockout, double-elimination, league, etc or a combination.

Only single club teams are allowed to enter the All-Ireland Club championship. If a team which is an amalgamation of two or more clubs, a divisional team or a university team wins a county's championship, a single club team will represent that county in the provincial championship as determined by that county's championship rules. Normally it is the club team that exited the county championship at the highest stage.

Provincial Championships

Leinster, Munster and Ulster organise a provincial championship for their participating county champions. Connacht discontinued their senior club championship after 2007 but they do organise intermediate and junior championships. The Galway champions represent Connacht in the All-Ireland senior club semi-finals as Galway club hurling is at higher level than the hurling in the other four Connacht counties.

Some Leinster, Munster and Ulster counties enter their senior champions in the All-Ireland intermediate club championship (tier 2) as it is recognised that club hurling is weak in those counties.

All matches are knock-out. Two ten minute periods of extra time are played each way if it's a draw at the end of normal time in all matches including the final. If the score is still level after extra time the match is replayed.

All-Ireland

The two semi-finals will be played on the weekend 4–5 January 2020 with the final scheduled for 19 January 2020 at Croke Park. The All-Ireland Club SHC final was traditionally played at Croke Park on 17 March (St Patrick's Day).

All matches are knock-out. Two ten minute periods of extra time are played each way if it's a draw at the end of normal time in the semi-finals or final. If the score is still level after extra time the match is replayed.

Initial Schedule

County championships April 2019 to November 2019
Provincial championships October 2019 to December 2019
All-Ireland semi-finals 4–5 January 2020
All-Ireland final 19 January 2020

== Team summaries ==
Team	County	Captain(s)	Manager(s)	Most recent success		
Team	County	Captain(s)	Manager(s)	All-Ireland	Provincial	County
Ballycran	Down	Pádraig Flynn	Gary Savage; Gary Gordon		1993	2018
Ballygunner	Waterford	Philip Mahony; Conor Power	Darragh O'Sullivan; David Franks		2018	2018
Ballyhale Shamrocks	Kilkenny	Michael Fennelly	Henry Shefflin	2019	2018	2018
Borris–Ileigh	Tipperary	Conor Kenny; Seán McCormack	Johnny Kelly	1987	1986	1986
Clonkill	Westmeath	Brendan Murtagh	Kevin O'Brien			2018
Cuala	Dublin	Colm Cronin	Willie Maher	2018	2018	2017
Dunloy	Antrim	Paul Shiels	Gregory O'Kane		2009	2017
Glen Rovers	Cork	Brian Moylan	Richie Kelleher	1977	1976	2016
Middletown	Armagh	Odhran Curry	Conor McCann			2017
Patrickswell	Limerick	Cian Lynch	Ciarán Carey		1990	2016
Rathdowney–Errill	Laois	Paddy Purcell	John Delaney			2014
Sixmilebridge	Clare	Séadna Morey; Noel Purcell	Tim Crowe	1996	2000	2017
Slaughtneil	Derry	Chrissy McKaigue	Michael McShane		2017	2018
St Martin's	Wexford	Willie Devereux; Paudie Kelly	Tomás Codd			2017
St Mullin's	Carlow	Marty Kavanagh	Niall O'Donnell			2016
St Rynagh's	Offaly	Conor Clancy	Ken Hogan		1993	2016
St Thomas'	Galway	Conor Cooney	Kevin Lally	2013		2018

== Leinster ==
Quarter-finals
Clonkill	2–15
Ballyhale Shamrocks	3–21
St Mullin's	2–13
Cuala	0–18
Rathdowney–Errill	4–16
St Rynagh's	0–10

Semi-finals
Ballyhale Shamrocks	5–18
St Martin's	1–16
St Mullin's	2–17
Rathdowney–Errill	1–19

Final
Ballyhale Shamrocks	1–21
St Mullin's	0–15

=== Quarter-finals ===
3 November 2019 Quarter-final	St Mullin's	2–13 – 0–18	Cuala	Dr Cullen Park, Carlow
	M Kavanagh (0–10, 0–9 frees); J Doyle (1–1), J Kavanagh (1–1), S Murphy (0–1).	Report	D Treacy (0–10, 0–8 frees), D Ó Floinn (0–2), S Moran (0–2), J Malone (0–1), D O’Connell (0–1); C Sheanon (0–1), B Fitzgerald (0–1)	Referee: M Murtagh (Westmeath)

3 November 2019 Quarter-final	Rathdowney–Errill	4–16 – 0–10	St Rynagh's	O'Moore Park, Portlaoise
	M Kavanagh 1–10 (1–0 pen, 0–1 sideline cut, 0–1 ’65, 0–8 frees), R King 2–0, J Ryan 1–1, P Purcell 0–2, S Dollard, J Fitzpatrick and B McGinley 0–1 each.	Report	A Treacy 0–6 (0–5 frees), G Conneely, S Dolan, O Hickey and G Scales 0–1 each.

3 November 2019 Quarter-final	Clonkill	2–15 – 3–21	Ballyhale Shamrocks	TEG Cusack Park, Mullingar
	B Murtagh 2–9 (0-5f, 0–1 ’65), N Dowdall 0–2, L Loughlin, L Folan, A Price, S Power 0–1 each.	Report	E Cody 3–4, TJ Reid 0–11 (0-7f), E Shefflin, R Reid, A Mullen, E Reid, E Kenneally, M Aylward 0–1 each.	Referee: J Heffernan (Wexford)

=== Semi-finals ===
16 November 2019 Semi-final	Ballyhale Shamrocks	5–18 – 1–16	St Martin's	UMPC Nowlan Park, Kilkenny
	TJ Reid 2–14 (0-11f, 0–1 sideline, 0–1 pen), C Fennelly, E Reid, B Cody 1–0 each, R Reid , E Cody 0–2 each, A Mullen 0–1.	Report	J Coleman 0–9 (0-8f, 0–1 ’65), M Codd 1–0, J O’Connor, H O’Connor 0–2 each, J Firman, D Codd and R O’Connor 0–1 each.	Referee: P Murphy (Carlow)

17 November 2019 Semi-final	St Mullin's	2–17 – 1–19	Rathdowney–Errill	Dr Cullen Park, Carlow
	M Kavanagh (1–9, 0–5 frees), J Doyle (0–5), P Boland (1–0), S Murphy (0–2), J O’Neill (0–1).	Report	M Kavanagh (0–12, 0–5 frees, 65), P Purcell (1–1); R King (0–2), J Ryan (0–1), P McCane (0–1), J Kelly (0–1), S Madden (0–1).	Referee: S Cleere (Kilkenny)

=== Final ===
1 December 2019 Final	Ballyhale Shamrocks	1–21 – 0–15	St Mullin's	MW Hire O'Moore Park, Portlaoise
	TJ Reid 0–9 (0-8f), A Mullen, B Cody 0–3 each, C Fennelly 1–0, E Cody 0–2, C Phelan, E Shefflin, M Aylward, E Reid 0–1 each.	Report	M Kavanagh 0–12 (0-8f, 0–1 ’65), J O’Neill 0–2 (0–1 sl), J Doyle 0–1.	Referee: Seán Stack (Dublin)

== Munster ==
Quarter-finals
Sixmilebridge	0–12
Ballygunner	1–21

Semi-finals
Borris-Ileigh	1–17
Glen Rovers	3–08
Ballygunner	0–17
Patrickswell	0–09

Final
Borris–Ileigh	1–12
Ballygunner	1–11

=== Quarter-final ===
3 November 2019 Quarter-final	Sixmilebridge	0–12 – 1–21	Ballygunner	O'Garney Park, Sixmilebridge
	A Morey (0-05, 0-04f), C Deasy (0-03), C Morey (0-02, 0-01f, 0-01'65), B Corry (0-01), J Shanahan (0-01).	Report	Pauric Mahony (0–10, 0-09f), D Hutchinson (1-02), P Hogan (0-03), C Power (0-02), C Sheahan (0-01), T O'Sullivan (0-01), M Mahony (0-01), B O'Keeffe (0-01, 0-01f).	Attendance: 1,916; Referee: K Jordan (Tipperary)

=== Semi-finals ===
10 November 2019 Semi-final	Borris–Ileigh	1–17 – 3–08	Glen Rovers	Semple Stadium, Thurles
	C Kenny 0–6; K Maher 0–5 (0-3f); J Kelly 0–4; J Devaney 1–0; B Maher 0–2 (0–1 f; 0–1 ‘65).	Report	P Horgan 2–4 (1-3f, 0–1 ‘65); M Dooley 1–0; D Brosnan 0–2; D Dooley, G Kennefick 0–1 each.	Referee: T Walsh (Waterford)

10 November 2019 Semi-final	Ballygunner	0–17 – 0–09	Patrickswell	Walsh Park, Waterford
	D Hutchinson and P Mahony (4fs) 0–5 each, M Mahony 0–4, P Hogan, B O’Sullivan, S O’Sullivan 0–1 each.	Report	A Gillane 0–5 (3fs), J Kelleher 0–2, D Byrnes (f), J Flynn 0–1.	Referee: N Wall (Cork)

=== Final ===
24 November 2019 Final	Ballygunner	1–11 – 1–12	Borris–Ileigh	Páirc Uí Rinn, Cork
	Pauric Mahony (0–5, 4 frees); D Hutchinson (0–3); B O’Sullivan (1–0); B O’Keeffe, P Leavy, C Sheahan (0–1 each).	Report	B Maher (0–7, 6 frees); Kieran Maher (1–0); J Kelly (0–3, 1 sideline); Kevin Maher, C Kenny (0–1 each).	Referee: J Murphy (Limerick)

== Ulster ==
Semi-finals
Slaughtneil	1–17
Middletown	0–08
Dunloy	2–23
Ballycran	0–11

Final
Slaughtneil	1–15
Dunloy	0–10

=== Semi-finals ===
27 October 2019 Semi-final	Slaughtneil	1–17 – 0–08	Middletown	Athletic Grounds, Armagh
12:45 pm	C O'Doherty (0–11, 0–9 frees), S McGuigan (1–0), B Cassidy (0–2), B Rodgers (0–2); G Bradley (0–1), C McKaigue (0–1).	Report	D Carvill (0–8, 0–7 frees).	Attendance: 3,553; Referee: C McDonald (Antrim)

27 October 2019 Semi-final	Dunloy	2–23 – 0–11	Ballycran	Athletic Grounds, Armagh
2:30 pm	C Cunning (1–7, 0–2 65, 0–4 frees), N Elliott (0–4), A McGrath (1–0), N McKeague (0–3), Keelan Molloy (0–3), P Shiels (0–2), C Brogan (0–1); E O’Neill (0–1), E Smyth (0–1), R McGarry (0–1).	Report	C Woods (0–6, 0–4 frees), L Savage (0–5).	Attendance: 3,553; Referee: J Clarke (Cavan)

=== Final ===
10 November 2019 Final	Dunloy	0–10 – 1–15	Slaughtneil	Páirc Esler, Newry
3:00 pm	C Cunning (0–7, 6f), R Molloy (0–1); E O'Neill (0–1), N Elliott (0–1).	Report	C O'Doherty 1–4 (1–0 pen, 4fs), B Rogers 0–3, J McGuigan 0–2, M McGuigan, Sé McGuigan, B Cassidy, M McGrath 0–1 each.

== Semi-finals ==
5 January 2020 Semi-final	Ballyhale Shamrocks	2–24 – 2–19	Slaughtneil	Páirc Esler, Newry
2:00 pm	TJ Reid 0–11 (10f), C Fennelly 2–1, E Shefflin, B Cody 0–3 each, R Corcoran, E Cody 0–2 each, E Reid, P Mullen 0–1.	Report	C O’Doherty 0–9 (9f), B Rogers 1–2, J McGuigan 1–0, B Cassidy 0–3, C McKaigue 0–2, M McGrath, S Ó Caiside, S McGuigan 0–1 each.	Referee: F Horgan (Tipperary)

5 January 2020 Semi-final	Borris–Ileigh	1–21 – 1–14	St Thomas'	LIT Gaelic Grounds, Limerick
	B Maher 0–10 (6fs,2 65s), Kevin Maher 0–5 (3fs), J Devaney 1–1, C Kenny 0–3, Kieran Maher, J Kelly 0–1 each.	Report	Darragh Burke 0–5 (3fs, 1 65), E Burke 1–0, C Cooney 0–3, B Burke 0–2, S Cooney, J Regan, David Burke, O Flannery all 0–1 each.	Referee: P O'Dwyer (Carlow)

== Final ==
19 January 2020 Final	Ballyhale Shamrocks	0–18 – 0–15	Borris–Ileigh	Croke Park, Dublin
2:00 pm	TJ Reid 0–8 (0-5f), P Mullen 0–3, E Shefflin, E Reid, A Mullen 0–2 each, C Fennelly 0–1.	Report	J Kelly 0–7 (0–1 sideline), B Maher 0–6 (0-4f), T Ryan, K Maher 0–1 each.	Referee: C Lyons (Cork)

== Bracket ==
Semi-finals
1L	Ballyhale Shamrocks	2–24
1U	Slaughtneil	2–19
1M	Borris–Ileigh	1–21
1C	St Thomas'	1–14

Final
1L	Ballyhale Shamrocks	0–18
1M	Borris–Ileigh	0–15

== Statistics ==
=== Top scorers ===
Top scorers overall

Rank	Player	Club	Tally	Total	Matches	Average
1	T. J. Reid	Ballyhale Shamrocks	2–53	59	5	11.80
2	Marty Kavanagh	St Mullin's	1–31	34	3	11.33
3	Cormac O'Doherty	Slaughtneil	1–24	27	3	9.00
4	Mark Kavanagh	Rathdowney–Errill	1–22	25	2	12.50
4	Brendan Maher	Borris–Ileigh	0–25	25	4	6.25
5	Pauric Mahony	Ballygunner	0–20	20	3	6.66
6	Eoin Cody	Ballyhale Shamrocks	3–10	19	5	3.80
7	Conal Cunning	Dunloy	1–14	17	2	8.50
8	Brendan Murtagh	Clonkill	2-09	15	1	15.00
8	Jerry Kelly	Borris–Ileigh	0–15	15	4	3.25
9	Colin Fennelly	Ballyhale Shamrocks	4-02	14	5	2.80
10	Dessie Hutchinson	Ballygunner	1–10	13	3	4.33

Top scorers in a single game

Rank	Player	Club	Tally	Total	Opposition
1	T. J. Reid	Ballyhale Shamrocks	2–14	20	St Martin's
2	Brendan Murtagh	Clonkill	2-09	15	Ballyhale Shamrocks
3	Eoin Cody	Ballyhale Shamrocks	3-04	13	Clonkill
3	Mark Kavanagh	Rathdowney–Errill	1–10	13	St Rynagh's
4	Marty Kavanagh	St Mullin's	1-09	12	Rathdowney–Errill
4	Mark Kavanagh	Rathdowney–Errill	0–12	12	St Mullin's
4	Marty Kavanagh	St Mullin's	0–12	12	Ballyhale Shamrocks
5	Cormac O'Doherty	Slaughtneil	0–11	11	Middletown
5	T. J. Reid	Ballyhale Shamrocks	0–11	11	Clonkill
5	T. J. Reid	Ballyhale Shamrocks	0–11	11	Slaughtneil

== Awards ==
Team of the Year

1. James McCormack
2. Paddy Stapleton
3. Joey Holden
4. Darren Mullen
5. Evan Shefflin
6. Brendan Maher
7. Shane Cooney
8. Dan McCormack
9. Chrissy McKaigue
10. Brendan Rogers
11. T. J. Reid
12. Jerry Kelly
13. Dessie Hutchinson
14. Colin Fennelly
15. Martin Kavanagh

Hurler of the Year

- PLAYER NAME (Club)

Also nominated: PLAYER NAME (Club) & PLAYER NAME (Club)
