= 2020 All-Ireland Senior Club Hurling Championship final =

2020 All-Ireland Senior Club Hurling Championship Final
- Event: 2019-20 All-Ireland Senior Club Hurling Championship
Ballyhale Shamrocks	Borris-Ileigh
0-18	0-15
- Date: 19 January 2020
- Venue: Croke Park, Dublin
- Weather: Dry

The 2020 All-Ireland Senior Club Hurling Championship final was a hurling match which was played at Croke Park on 19 January 2020 to determine the winners of the 2019-20 All-Ireland Senior Club Hurling Championship, the 50th season of the All-Ireland Senior Club Hurling Championship, a tournament organised by the Gaelic Athletic Association for the champion clubs of the four provinces of Ireland. The final was contested by Ballyhale Shamrocks of Kilkenny and Borris-Ileigh of Tipperary.

The All-Ireland final between Ballyhale Shamrocks and Borris-Ileigh was the first ever championship meeting between the two teams. Ballyhale Shamrocks were hoping to win their 8th All-Ireland Club Championship, while Borris-Ileigh were bidding to win their second title after previously winning in 1987.

Ballyhale Shamrocks, captained by Michael Fennelly and coached by Henry Shefflin retained the title after defeating Borris-Ileigh by 0-18 to 0-15 to retain the title.

== Match ==
=== Details ===
19 January 2020 Final	Ballyhale Shamrocks	0-18 - 0-15	Borris-Ileigh	Croke Park, Dublin
2:00 pm	TJ Reid 0-8 (0-5f), P Mullen 0-3, E Shefflin, E Reid, A Mullen 0-2 each, C Fennelly 0-1.	Report	J Kelly 0-7 (0-1 sideline), B Maher 0-6 (0-4f), T Ryan, K Maher 0-1 each.	Referee: C Lyons (Cork)
