= Brendan Fennelly =

Irish hurler and manager (1956–2019)

Personal information
- Native name: Breandán Ó Fionnalaigh (Irish)
- Born: 1956 Piltown, County Kilkenny, Ireland
- Died: 31 July 2019 (aged 63) Kilmoganny, County Kilkenny, Ireland
- Height: 5 ft 10 in (178 cm)

Sport
- Sport: Hurling
- Position: Right corner-forward
Club
- Years: Club
- 1970s–1990s: Ballyhale Shamrocks
Club titles
- Kilkenny titles: 8
- Leinster titles: 4
- All-Ireland Titles: 3
Inter-county
- Years: County
- 1977–1980: Kilkenny
Inter-county titles
- Leinster titles: 0
- All-Irelands: 0
- NHL: 0
- All Stars: 0

Brendan Fennelly (1956 – 31 July 2019) was an Irish hurling manager and player.

A member of the famous Fennelly hurling dynasty, he enjoyed a successful playing career at club level with Ballyhale Shamrocks and at inter-county level with Kilkenny. He was a forward with the Kilkenny minor, under-21 and senior teams in the 1970s and collected All-Ireland medals at under-age levels. Fennelly was also an All-Ireland medal-winner at club level with Ballyhale.

In retirement from playing, Fennelly has become involved in team management at all levels. He served as manager of the Carlow senior inter-county team in the late 1990s while also having spells with the Dunnamaggin, De La Salle and Carrickshock clubs. Fennelly was manager of the Laois senior hurling team from 2010 until 2011.

== Biography ==
Fennelly was born in Piltown, County Kilkenny to Kevin Fennelly Snr. and the former Teresa Hoyne in 1956. At the age of five, the family moved to Ballyhale where his father purchased a farm. It was here that his interest in hurling was developed in the local national school and in the local club. The Fennellys would go on to become one of the most famous families in Kilkenny hurling history. All seven brothers – Brendan, Michael, Ger, Kevin, Liam, Seán and Dermot – would play for Ballyhale Shamrocks, while many of them would also represent Kilkenny at various levels on the inter-county scene. His nephew, Michael Fennelly, captained Kilkenny to the All-Ireland title in 2009. His daughter, Shauna, is currently studying Nursing in the University of Limerick.

== Playing career ==
=== Club ===
The Fennelly family have a long association with the famous Ballyhale Shamrocks club. Kevin Fennelly Snr. was instrumental in helping to found the club in 1972.

By 1978 the new club had reached the top of the local hurling world and Fennelly was at full-forward as Ballyhale captured their very first senior county title. This victory allowed the Shamrocks club to represent Kilkenny in the provincial club championship. The final of that competition saw Fennelly's side take on Dublin champions Crumlin. A 1–13 to 1–6 victory gave Fennelly his first Leinster club title. The subsequent All-Ireland club final saw Ballyhale Shamrocks take on Cork's famous Blackrock club. A ten-goal thriller saw Blackrock take the title by 5–7 to 5–5.

Fennelly added two further county medals to his collection to make it three in-a-row in 1979 and 1980. This latter victory was converted into a Leinster club title following a 3–10 to 1–8 victory over Coolderry of Offaly. Once again Ballyhale Shamrocks reached the All-Ireland final where the star-studded St. Finbarr's club from Cork provided the opposition. On that occasion all seven Fennelly brothers lined out in an exciting contest. The sides were level on five occasions during the opening thirty minutes; however, the Shamrocks had the edge. At the full-time whistle Ballyhale were the winners by 0–15 to 1–11 and Fennelly collected his first All-Ireland club winners' medal.

Another county championship victory followed for Fennelly in 1982, however, he missed the 1983 county final win due to injury. He was back on the team to collect a second Leinster club title following a six-point victory over Kinnitty of Offaly. Ballyhale later qualified for the All-Ireland final where Galway champions Gort were the opponents. That game ended in 1–10 apiece draw thanks to a last-minute equalising point by Dermot Fennelly. The replay took place over six weeks later with Ger Fennelly playing a starring role. His first-half goal was the deciding factor as Ballyhale won the day by 1–10 to 0–7. It was Fennelly's second All-Ireland club medal.

The rest of the 1980s saw Fennelly bring his county championship tally up to seven with further wins in 1985, 1988 and 1989. The third of these victories was subsequently converted into a fourth Leinster club title following a trouncing of the Cuala club from Dublin. Ballyhale later qualified for the All-Ireland final where Limerick and Munster representatives Ballybrown were the opponents. Ballybrown stormed into a six-point lead in the middle of the first-half before Liam Fennelly scored a goal in the twenty-fourth minute. At half-time Ballybrown still led by four points, however, a surge by Ballyhale saw the Kilkenny side claim a 1–16 to 0–16 victory. It was Fennelly's third All-Ireland winners' medal.

Fennelly won his eighth and final county medal with Ballyhale in 1991. He retired from club hurling shortly afterwards.

=== Inter-county ===
Fennelly first came to prominence on the inter-county scene as a member of the Kilkenny minor hurling team in the early 1970s. He won a Leinster title in that grade in 1974 following an outstanding 8–19 to 3–5 victory over Dublin. Kilkenny later faced arch-rivals Cork in the All-Ireland final and a close game developed. At the full-time whistle Fennelly ended up on the losing side by 1–10 to 1–8. It was his last game in the minor grade.

Fennelly failed to make an impact on the Kilkenny under-21 team immediately, however, by 1976 he was an integral part of the team. That year he captured a Leinster title in that grade following a 3–21 to 0–5 trouncing of Wexford. The subsequent All-Ireland final pitted 'the Cats' against Cork. While Fennelly's side had cause for optimism, Cork ran away with the game and recorded a huge 2–17 to 1–8 victory.

Eligible for the under-21 grade again in 1977, Fennelly collected a second consecutive Leinster title after a seven-point defeat of Wexford. Kilkenny again squared off against Cork in the subsequent All-Ireland final, however, on this occasion the game was much closer. After a tense hour of hurling Kilkenny emerged victorious by 2–9 to 1–9 and Febbelly collected an All-Ireland under-21 winners' medal.

Shortly after ending his involvement at under-21 level Fennelly joined the Kilkenny senior hurling team. He was a non-playing substitute as 'the Cats' reached the final of the 1977–78 National Hurling League. For the third year in succession Clare provided the opposition, however, on this occasion they were the reigning champions. A close game developed, however, at the long whistle Clare were still the champions by 3–10 to 1–10.

Fennelly was on and off the Kilkenny team until the early 1980s when a broken leg ended any hope of making the breakthrough at senior level.

== Management career ==
=== Early experience ===
In retirement from club hurling Fennelly immediately became involved in team management and coaching. In 1994 he was part of the backroom team with the Kilkenny under-21 hurling team. It was a successful move for Fennelly as the team secured the Leinster and All-Ireland titles that year.

After moving to Dunnamaggin in the mid-1990s Fennelly quickly got immersed in the local club and helped them to their most successful spell ever as they won three minor county titles, three under-21 county titles and went from junior champions to senior champions in just four years.

In 1996 Fennelly ventured into inter-county management for the very first time when he took charge of the Carlow senior hurling team. In 1997 he helped the team to gain promotion from division 2 of the National League, however, a restructuring of the format meant that Carlow were denied the chance to play in the top tier of the league. Fennelly remained with Carlow for a second season, however, he enjoyed little success in 1998.

In 1999 Fennelly returned to the Dunnamaggin club who by now were languishing in the intermediate grade. Under Fennelly the club began the climb again, winning the intermediate title in 2000 before getting back to the senior final in 2002. There they were denied by a D. J. Carey-inspired Young Irelands side and a second senior title eluded them.

Fennelly then moved to De La Salle in Waterford and although they didn't win anything, he returned a couple of years later to join the backroom team as they won county and Munster titles before falling to Portumna in the All Ireland decider.

By 2010 Fennelly was back in Kilkenny and in charge of the Carrickshock club.

=== Laois ===
In September 2010 Fennelly was confirmed as the new Laois senior hurling team manager.

== Honours ==
=== Ballyhale Shamrocks ===
- All-Ireland Senior Club Hurling Championship:
  - Winner: 1981, 1984, 1990
  - Runner-up: 1979
- Leinster Senior Club Hurling Championship:
  - Winner: 1978, 1980, 1983, 1989
  - Runner-up: 1988, 1991
- Kilkenny Senior Club Hurling Championship:
  - Winner: 1978, 1979, 1980, 1982, 1985, 1988, 1989, 1991
  - Runner-up: 1984, 1986, 1987

=== Kilkenny ===
- National Hurling League:
  - Winner:
  - Runner-up: 1977–78
- All-Ireland Under-21 Hurling Championship:
  - Winner: 1976
  - Runner-up: 1977
- Leinster Under-21 Hurling Championship:
  - Winner: 1976, 1977
- All-Ireland Minor Hurling Championship:
  - Winner: 1974
- Leinster Minor Hurling Championship:
  - Winner: 1974

Sporting positions
Preceded by	Carlow Senior Hurling Manager; 1996–1998	Succeeded by Frank Keenan
Preceded by Niall Rigney	Laois Senior Hurling Manager; 2010–2011	Succeeded by Teddy McCarthy
