= 1981 All-Ireland Senior Club Hurling Championship final =

1981 All-Ireland Senior Club Hurling Championship Final
- Event: 1980–81 All-Ireland Senior Club Hurling Championship
Ballyhale Shamrocks	St Finbarr's
1-15	1-11
- Date: 17 May 1981
- Venue: Semple Stadium, Thurles
- Referee: Noel O'Donoghue (Dublin)

The 1981 All-Ireland Senior Club Hurling Championship final was a hurling match played at Semple Stadium on 17 May 1981 to determine the winners of the 1980–81 All-Ireland Senior Club Hurling Championship, the 11th season of the All-Ireland Senior Club Hurling Championship, a tournament organised by the Gaelic Athletic Association for the champion clubs of the four provinces of Ireland. The final was contested by Ballyhale Shamrocks of Kilkenny and St Finbarr's of Cork, with Ballyhale Shamrocks winning by 1-15 to 1-11.

The All-Ireland final was a unique occasion as it was the first ever championship meeting between Ballyhale Shamrocks and St Finbarr's. It remains their only championship meeting at this level. St Finbarr's were hoping to win a record-equaling third All-Ireland title while Ballyhale Shamrocks were hoping to win their first title.

Victory for Ballyhale Shamrocks secured their first All-Ireland title. They became the 7th club to win the All-Ireland title, while they were the second Kilkenny representatives to claim the ultimate prize.

== Match ==
=== Details ===
17 May 1981

Ballyhale Shamrocks	1-15 - 1-11	St Finbarr's
B Fennelly 0-11 (5f), L Fennelly 1-1, G Fennelly 0-3.		C McCarthy 0-5 (4f), J Barry-Murphy 1-0, J Cremin 0-2, (1 '70', 1f), T Maher 0-2, C Ryan 0-1, J Allen 0-1.

Semple Stadium, Thurles
Referee: N O'Donoghue (Dublin)
