= Nuala Woulfe =

Irish writer

Nuala Woulfe is an Irish writer whose first novel, Chasing Rainbows, was published by Poolbeg in January 2009. This work was inspired by dreams she started having after beginning colour therapy to treat migraines. Chasing Rainbows was the first of three books published by Poolbeg Press, Ireland. Woulfe's second book, Two to Tango, was published in November 2010. The Goddess Village was published in 2012. Woulfe also writes comic verse and sometimes writes articles for the Irish Examiner. Woulfe studied journalism at the College of Commerce, Dublin and is a graduate of University College, Dublin where she studied psychology, politics and sociology. She is currently researching an Irish historical novel set in Tudor times.
