= James Mathias Fennelly =

American novelist

James M. Fennelly (September 5, 1929 – January 8, 2000) was Chairman of the Department of Philosophy and Professor of History of Religions at Adelphi University in Garden City, New York. For several years prior to his death, Fennelly was pastor of the First Presbyterian Church, Maywood, New Jersey.

Fennelly was born in the Bronx, New York, and grew up in the lower Hudson Valley. He received an undergraduate degree from Springfield College, Massachusetts and Master of Divinity from Union Theological Seminary in New York City.

While at Union Theological Seminary, Fennelly studied under Protestant theologian Reinhold Niebuhr.

In 1954, he was ordained into the Presbyterian ministry. The same year, he married Zona "Zee" Zeitner. In 1967, he received a master's degree in New Testament Studies from Victoria University in Manchester England.

Among Fennelly's contributions as historian of religion include articles in The Biblical Archaeologist on religious ceremonies performed in the ancient city of Persepolis.

In 1999, Fennelly completed a historical novel from the perspective of Chuza, steward of Herod Antipas and husband to Joanna, a disciple of Jesus of Nazareth.
