= Aed (god) =

God in Irish mythology

Aed, or Aodh, is the prince of the Daoine Sidhe and a god of Irish mythology. He is known from inscriptions as the eldest son of Lir, High King of the Tuatha de Dannan, and Aoibh, a daughter of Bodb Dearg. Aed is elsewhere described in the Dindsenchas as being the Dagda's son and brother of Cermait and Aengus killed by Corchenn of Cruach for seducing Corchenn's wife.

== Etymology ==
Aed's name is derived from the Old Irish word for fire, derived from a Proto-Indo European verb meaning "to burn" or "to kindle". In the Dindsenchas, he is given the epithet "of the wind-swift horses" and called "Aed Luirgnech," meaning "big-shins".

== Children of Lir ==
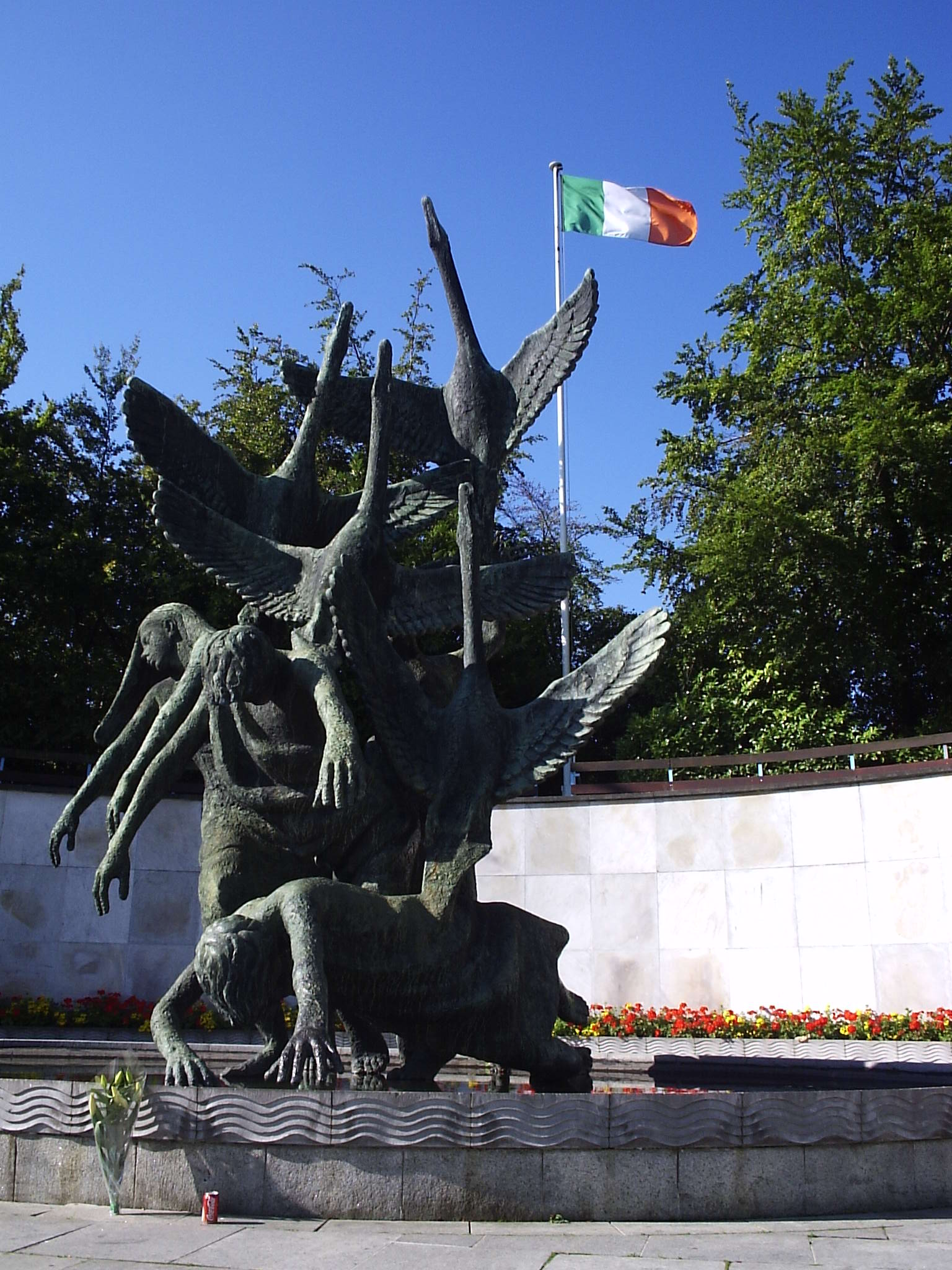
Sculpture in Garden of Remembrance in Dublin. It is called Children of Lir.

According to tradition, Aoibh died in childbirth after bearing Lir four children (two sets of twins): Fionnuala and Aodh were the first pair and Fiachra and Conn were the second. Aoife, the second wife of Lir, and in some versions of the story, the sister of Aobh, was very jealous of the children and conspired to kill them on a journey to see Bodb Dearg, the King of the Tuatha de Dannan. But for love of the Children of Lir, the servants of Aoife would not slay the children, and so she cursed them to live as swans for 900 years: 300 upon Lough Derravaragh, 300 in the English Channel, and 300 on the Sea of Moyle.

Legend says they kept their voices and learned all the songs and tales of Ireland, as well as the many languages brought by travelers from distant places.

There are numerous variations on the culmination of the story after the breaking of Aoife's curse, and most are obviously influenced by stories from Christianity. For more on the story, see the article on the Children of Lir.

== Son of the Dagda ==
As the son of the Dagda, Aed, described as "faultless" and a bright-faced youth, was reportedly killed on Benn Bain Baith by Corrgend of Cruach, and buried at Ailech of Imchell. Corrgend killed Aed for having an affair with Corrgend's wife Tethra. Corrgend is described as a hero swift of hand and every man's foe, who could not find rest and refuge in fields, wood, sea, or anywhere under the white sun after killing Aed. The Dagda cursed Corrgend, so that he could not remove Aed's body from his back until he found an appropriate stone to mark Aed's grave. The Dagda, described as the king of the Tuatha Dé Danann, pursued Corggend until he was "storm-beaten", then forced Corggend to dig Aed's grave. Here Aed is explicitly described as son of the Dagda and brother of Aengus and Cermait.

== See also ==
- Agni, the Vedic fire god
- Aidan of Lindisfarne
