= Ger Fennelly =

Irish hurler

Personal information
- Native name: Gearóid Ó Fionnalaigh (Irish)
- Born: 22 January 1954 (age 72) Piltown, County Kilkenny, Ireland
- Occupation: Carpenter
- Height: 5 ft 10 in (178 cm)

Sport
- Sport: Hurling
- Position: Midfield
Club
- Years: Club
- Ballyhale Shamrocks
Club titles
- Kilkenny titles: 9
- Leinster titles: 4
- All-Ireland Titles: 3
Inter-county*
| Years | County | Apps (scores) |
| 1974–1990 | Kilkenny | 33 (3-78) |
Inter-county titles
- Leinster titles: 6
- All-Irelands: 3
- NHL: 3
- All Stars: 1
- *Inter County team apps and scores correct as of 12:54, 18 June 2015.

Ger Fennelly (born 22 January 1954) is an Irish retired hurler who played as a centre-forward and as a midfielder for the Kilkenny senior team.

Born in Piltown, County Kilkenny, Fennelly first arrived on the inter-county scene at the age of seventeen when he first linked up with the Kilkenny minor team before later joining the under-21 side. He joined the senior panel during the 1974 championship. Fennelly subsequently became a regular member of the starting fifteen and won three All-Ireland medals, six Leinster medals and three National Hurling League medals. The All-Ireland-winning captain of 1979, he was an All-Ireland runner-up on two occasions.

Fennelly was a member of the Leinster inter-provincial team on a number of occasions, however, he never won a Railway Cup medal. At club level he is a three-time All-Ireland medallist with Ballyhale Shamrocks. In addition to this Hennessy has also won four Leinster medals and nine championship medals.

His brothers, Michael, Kevin, Brendan, Liam and Seán Fennelly, Dermot and his nephews, Michael and Colin Fennelly, have all enjoyed All-Ireland success with Kilkenny.

Throughout his career Fennelly made 33 championship appearances. His retirement came following the conclusion of the 1990 championship.

In retirement from playing Fennelly became involved in team management and coaching. He was a selector with the Kilkenny minor team that won the Leinster title in 1998.

Fennelly is widely regarded as one of the greatest club hurlers of his era. During his playing days he won one All-Star awards as well as being named at left wing-forward on the Club Hurling Silver Jubilee Team.

== Playing career ==
=== Club ===
In 1978 Fennelly enjoyed his first success with the Ballyhale Shamrocks senior team. A 0-15 to 0-10 defeat of reigning champions Fenians secured a very first title for the club and a first championship medal for Fennelly. He later added a Leinster medal to his collection following a subsequent 1-13 to 1-6 defeat of Dublin champions Crumlin in the decider. On 25 March 1979 Ballyhale faced Blackrock in the All-Ireland decider. Two first-half Ray Cummins goals gave the Rockies a narrow lead while a fifth goal from Tom Lyons resulted in a narrow 5-7 to 5-5 defeat for Fennelly's side.

Fennelly added a second championship medal to his collection in 1979 as Ballyhale retained the title following a 3-12 to 1-6 defeat of Erin's Own following an earlier drawn game.

Ballyhale made it three-in-a-row in 1980 following a 3-13 to 1-10 replay defeat of Muckalee/Ballyfoyle Rovers. After collecting a third successive championship medal Fennelly later added a second Leinster medal to his collection as Coolderry were accounted for on a 3-10 to 1-8 score line. On 17 May 1981 Ballyhale faced a star-studded St. Finbarr's in the All-Ireland final. On that occasion all seven Fennelly brothers lined out in an exciting contest. The sides were level on five occasions during the opening thirty minutes, however, the Shamrocks had the edge after a Liam Fennelly goal. Jimmy Barry-Murphy pegged one back for the Barr's in the closing stages, however, a 1-15 to 1-11 victory secured an All-Ireland medal foe Fennelly.

Four-in-a-row proved beyond Ballyhale, however, Fennelly won a fourth championship medal in 1982 following a 3-10 to 2-4 defeat of James Stephens.

Fennelly missed Ballyhale's championship decider defeat of James Stephens in 1983, however, he was later restored to the starting fifteen and collected a third Leinster medal following a 3-6 to 0-9 defeat of Kinnitty. On 15 April 1984 Ballyhale faced Gort in the All-Ireland decider. A 59th-minute Dermot Fennelly goal secured a 1-10 apiece draw for the Shamrocks. The replay on 3 June 1984 was also a close affair. A first-half Fennelly goal paved the way for a 1-10 to 0-7 victory and a second All-Ireland medal for Fennelly.

In 1985 Fennelly won a fifth championship medal following a high-scoring 4-18 to 3-13 defeat of Glenmore.

After back-to-back defeats Ballyhale bounced back in 1988. A 2-15 to 0-4 trouncing of Thoamstown secured a sixth championship medal for Fennelly.

Ballyhale retained the title in 1989 following a narrow 2-11 to 1-13 defeat of Glenmore with Fennelly collecting a seventh championship medal. He later added a fourth Leinster medal to his collection as Cuala endured a 2-11 to 0-7 defeat in the provincial decider. On 17 March 1990 Ballyhale faced Ballybrown in the All-Ireland final. The Shamrocks were trailing by six points when a 24th-minute Fennelly goal brought them back into the game. The margin was four points at the interval, however, a second-half surge gave Ballyhale a 1-16 to 0-16 victory and a third All-Ireland medal for Fennelly.

Fennelly won an eighth and final championship medal in 1991 following a 3-16 to 1-8 defeat of St. Martin's.

=== Minor and under-21 ===
Fennelly first played for Kilkenny as a member of the minor team in 1972. A 7-10 to 0-4 trouncing of Wexford secured a second successive provincial title for the team and a Leinster medal for Fennelly. On 3 September 1972 Kilkenny faced Galway in the subsequent All-Ireland decider. The game was a one-sided affair, and at the full-time whistle Kilkenny were the champions by 8-7 to 3-9. The victory gave Fennelly an All-Ireland Minor Hurling Championship medal.

By 1974 Fennelly had joined the Kilkenny under-21 team and was captain of the side. He won his first Leinster medal that year as Kilkenny accounted for Wexford by 3-8 to 1-5. The subsequent All-Ireland decider against first-time finalists Waterford was a close affair, however, at the final whistle Kilkenny were the champions by 3-8 to 3-7. It was a first All-Ireland medal for Fennelly while he also had the honour of lifting the cup in Kilkenny's first title in that grade.

Fennelly added a second Leinster medal to his collection in 1975 as Kilkenny once again defeated Wexford by 3-14 to 0-8. The subsequent All-Ireland final against Cork was rated the best hurling game of the year. Kilkenny ‘keeper Kevin Fennelly brought off two brilliant saves from Con Brassil and Finbarr Delaney in the closing stages to secure a 5-13 to 2-19 victory and a second consecutive All-Ireland medal for Fennelly.

=== Senior ===
Fennelly was added to the Kilkenny senior panel in 1974. He was an unused substitute throughout the entire championship campaign which saw Kilkenny claim the Leinster and All-Ireland titles.

On 29 June 1975 Fennelly made his senior championship debut in a 3-16 to 1-7 Leinster semi-final defeat of Dublin. He played no part in Kilkenny's subsequent Leinster and All-Ireland triumphs.

By 1978 Fennelly was still a substitute on the senior team. He was sprung from the bench in that year's provincial decider and collected his first Leinster medal on the field of play following Kilkenny's 2–16 to 1–16 defeat of reigning champions Wexford. Fennelly was confined to the bench for Kilkenny's subsequent 1–15 to 2–8 defeat by Cork in the All-Ireland final.

Fennelly was appointed captain of the team in 1979. He won a second successive Leinster medal that year as Wexford were defeated by 2-21 to 2-17. On 2 September 1979 Kilkenny faced Galway in the All-Ireland final. Bad weather and an unofficial train drivers’ strike resulted in the lowest attendance at a final in over twenty years. The bad weather also affected the hurling with Kilkenny scoring two freak goals as Galway ‘keeper Séamus Shinnors had a nightmare of a game. A Liam “Chunky” O’Brien 70-yard free went all the way to the net in the first half, while with just three minutes remaining a 45-yard shot from Mick Brennan was helped by the wind and dipped under the crossbar. Kilkenny won by 2-12 to 1-8 with Fennelly winning his first All-Ireland medal on the field of play while he also had the honour of lifting the Liam MacCarthy Cup.

After a fallow two-year period, Kilkenny bounced back in 1982 with Fennelly winning his first National Hurling League medal following a 2-14 to 1-11 defeat of Wexford. He later added a third Leinster medal to his collection following a 1-11 to 0-12 defeat of three-in-a-row hopefuls and reigning All-Ireland champions Offaly. On 5 September 1982 Kilkenny and Cork renewed their rivalry in the All-Ireland decider. The Cats were rank outsiders on the day, however, a brilliant save by Noel Skehan was followed by two quick goals by Christy Heffernan just before the interval. Éamonn O'Donoghue pegged a goal back for Cork, however, Fennelly added a third for Kilkenny who secured a 3-18 to 1-13 victory. It was a second All-Ireland medal for Fennelly.

Fennelly won a second consecutive league medal in 1983 following a narrow 2-14 to 2-12 defeat of Limerick before later collecting a fourth Leinster medal as Offaly were accounted for by 1-17 to 0-13. The All-Ireland final on 4 September 1983 was a replay of the previous year with Cork hoping to avenge that defeat. Billy Fitzpatrick was the star with ten points, giving Kilkenny a 2-14 to 1-9 lead with seventeen minutes left, however, they failed to score for the remainder of the game. A stunning comeback by Cork just fell short and Fennelly collected a third All-Ireland medal following a 2-14 to 2-12 victory. He later won an All-Star.

In 1986 the team bounced back with Fennelly collecting a third league medal following a 2-10 to 2-6 defeat of Galway. He later collected a fifth Leinster medal following a 4-10 to 1-11 defeat of reigning champions Offaly.

Fennelly won a sixth and final Leinster medal in 1987 as Offaly were downed once again by 2-14 to 0-17. On 6 September 1987 Galway, a team who were hoping to avoid becoming the first team to lose three finals in-a-row, faced a Kilkenny team who for many of its players knew it would be their last chance to claim an All-Ireland medal. Galway 'keeper John Commins saved two goal chances from Ger Fennelly, while at the other end substitute Noel Lane bagged a decisive goal as Galway claimed a 1-12 to 0-9 victory.

During the 1989-90 league campaign Fennelly was dropped from the starting fifteen. He was an unused substitute as Kilkenny defeated New York by 0-19 to 0-9. Fennelly remained on the bench for Kilkenny's championship campaign which ended in a Leinster semi-final defeat by Offaly, thus bringing the curtain down on his inter-county career.

=== Inter-provincial ===
Fennelly also lined out with Leinster in the inter-provincial hurling competition. He played in the Railway Cup finals in 1983 and 1984, however, Fennelly never ended up on the winning side.

== Coaching career ==
In 1998 Fennelly was a selector with the Kilkenny minor hurling team. That year he helped steer the team to a Leinster title following a 2-15 to 0-6 defeat of Wexford in a replay. On 13 September 1998 Kilkenny faced Cork in the All-Ireland decider. A 2-15 to 1-9 defeat was the result on that occasion.

== Honours ==
=== Player ===
Ballyhale Shamrocks

- All-Ireland Senior Club Hurling Championship (3): 1981, 1984, 1990
- Leinster Senior Club Hurling Championship (4): 1978, 1980, 1983, 1989
- Kilkenny Senior Club Hurling Championship (8): 1978, 1979, 1980, 1982, 1985, 1988, 1989, 1991

Kilkenny

- All-Ireland Senior Hurling Championship (5): 1974 (sub), 1975 (sub), 1979, 1982, 1983
- Leinster Senior Hurling Championship (8): 1974 (sub), 1975 (sub), 1978, 1979, 1982, 1983, 1986, 1987
- National Hurling League (5): 1975-76 (sub), 1981-82, 1982-83, 1985-86, 1989-90
- All-Ireland Under-21 Hurling Championship (2): 1974 (c), 1975
- Leinster Under-21 Hurling Championship (2): 1974 (c), 1975
- All-Ireland Minor Hurling Championship (1): 1972
- Leinster Minor Hurling Championship (1): 1972

=== Selector ===
Kilkenny

- Leinster Minor Hurling Championship (1): 1998

Sporting positions
| Preceded by Ger Henderson | Kilkenny Senior Hurling Captain; 1979 | Succeeded by Richie Reid |
Achievements
| Preceded by Martin O'Doherty (Cork) | All-Ireland Under-21 Hurling Final winning captain 1974 | Succeeded by Kevin Fennelly (Kilkenny) |
| Preceded by Charlie McCarthy (Cork) | All-Ireland Senior Hurling Final winning captain 1979 | Succeeded by Joe Connolly (Galway) |
