= Lir =

Sea god in Irish mythology

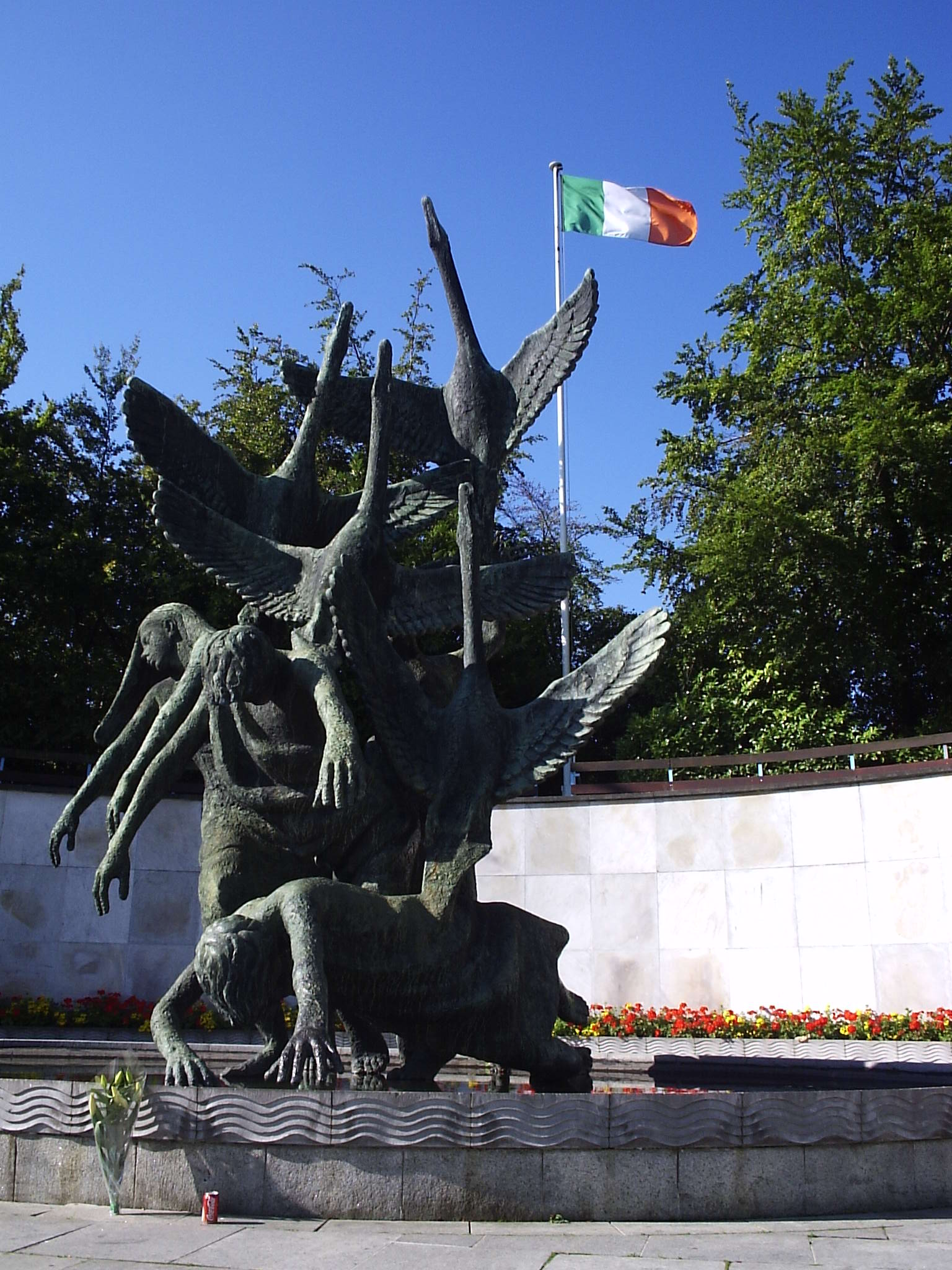
The Children of Lir, sculpture in the Garden of Remembrance (Dublin)

Lir or Ler (meaning "Sea" in Old Irish; Ler and Lir are the nominative and genitive forms, respectively) is a sea god in Irish mythology. His name suggests that he is a personification of the sea, rather than a distinct deity. He is named Allód in early genealogies, and corresponds to the Llŷr of Welsh mythology. Lir is chiefly an ancestor figure, and is the father of the god Manannán mac Lir, who appears frequently in medieval Irish literature. Lir appears as the eponymous king in the tale The Children of Lir.

== Gaelic references ==
Lir, like his Welsh counterpart Llŷr, is a god of the sea, though in the case of the Gaelic myths his son Manannán mac Lir seems to take over his position and so features more prominently. It is probable that more myths referring to Lir which are now lost to us existed and that his popularity was greater, especially considering the number of figures called 'son of Lir'.

In the 9th century AD Irish glossary entitled Sanas Cormaic, famed bishop and scholar Cormac mac Cuilennáin makes mention of Manannan and his father Lir, who Cormac identifies with the sea:

Manannan mac lir .i. cennaige amra bói aninis Manand. ise luam as deach boi aniarthar Eorpa. noḟindad tre nemgnacht (.i. gnathugrud nime) inoiret nobíd insoinind ⁊ in do[i]nind ⁊ intan nosclæchlóbad cechtar don dá résin, inde Scoti et Brittones eum deum vocaverunt maris. et inde filium maris esse dixerunt .i. mac lir mac mara.

"Manannan mac Lir: i. e. a renowned trader who dwelt in the Isle of Man. He was the best pilot in the west of Europe. Through acquaintance with the sky he knew the quarter in which would be fair weather and foul weather, and when each of these two seasons would change. Hence the Scots and Britons called him a god of the sea, and hence they said he was son of the sea, i. e. mac lir 'son of the sea"

Lir is a key character in the mythological story The Children of Lir; however, it is not definitely established whether this is the same person as Manannán's father or a different Lir. The Lir in this story was the rival of Bodb Dearg for the kingship of the Tuatha Dé Danann after their retreat into the fairy mounds. In order to appease Lir, Bodb gave one of his daughters to marry him, Aeb. The couple had four children, one girl, Fionnuala, and three sons, Aed and twins, Fiachra and Conn.

Aebh died and, not wanting the children to remain motherless, Bodb sent another of his daughters, Aoife, to marry Lir. Aoife grew jealous of the children and cursed them to live as swans for 900 years.

As Allod the "all-famous," Lir is listed as the father of Crofhind the Chaste in the Metrical Dindshenchas.

In the poem "Baile Suthain Sith Eamhain" Midir is named as the father of Lir and grandfather of Manannan. A son of Lir is named as Lodan in The Adventures of Art son of Conn.

== See also ==
- Ægir, a personification of the sea in Norse mythology
