= Fionnuala =

- Irish mythology character

In-universe information
- Alias: Finnguala
- Gender: Female
- Relatives: Lir (father); Fiachra (brother); Conn (brother); Aodh (brother)

In Irish mythology, Finnguala (modern spellings: Fionnghuala, Fionnuala /ˌfiːəˈnuːələ/, or Finola; literally fionn-ghuala meaning "white shoulder") was the daughter of Lir of the Tuatha Dé Danann. In the legend of the Children of Lir, she was changed into a swan and cursed by her stepmother, Aoife, to wander the lakes and rivers of Ireland, with her brothers Fiachra, Conn and Aodh, for 900 years until saved by the marriage of Lairgren, son of Colman, son of Cobthach, and Deoch, daughter of Finghin, whose union broke the curse. 'The Song of Fionnuala', with lyrics by Thomas Moore speaks of her wanderings.

The name is anglicized as Fenella. The shortened version Nuala is commonly used as a first name in contemporary Ireland.

== People ==
People named Fionnuala

- Fionnuala Boyd
- Fionnuala Carr
- Fionnuala Ellwood
- Fionnuala Kenny
- Fionnuala McCormack
- Fionnuala Ní Aoláin
- Fionnuala Ní Fhlatharta
- Fionnuala Ní Flaithbheartaigh
- Fionnuala Sherry
- Fionnuala Sweeney

People named Fionnula

- Fionnula Flanagan

People named Finola

- Finola Dwyer
- Finola Hughes
- Finola Moorhead
- Finola O'Donnell
- Finola O'Donnell (Iníon Dubh)
- Finola O'Farrell
