= False fennel =

False fennel is a common name for several flowering plants and may refer to:

- Eupatorium leptophyllum, native to the southeastern United States
- Ridolfia segetum, native to the Mediterranean region
