= MV Fenella (1986) =

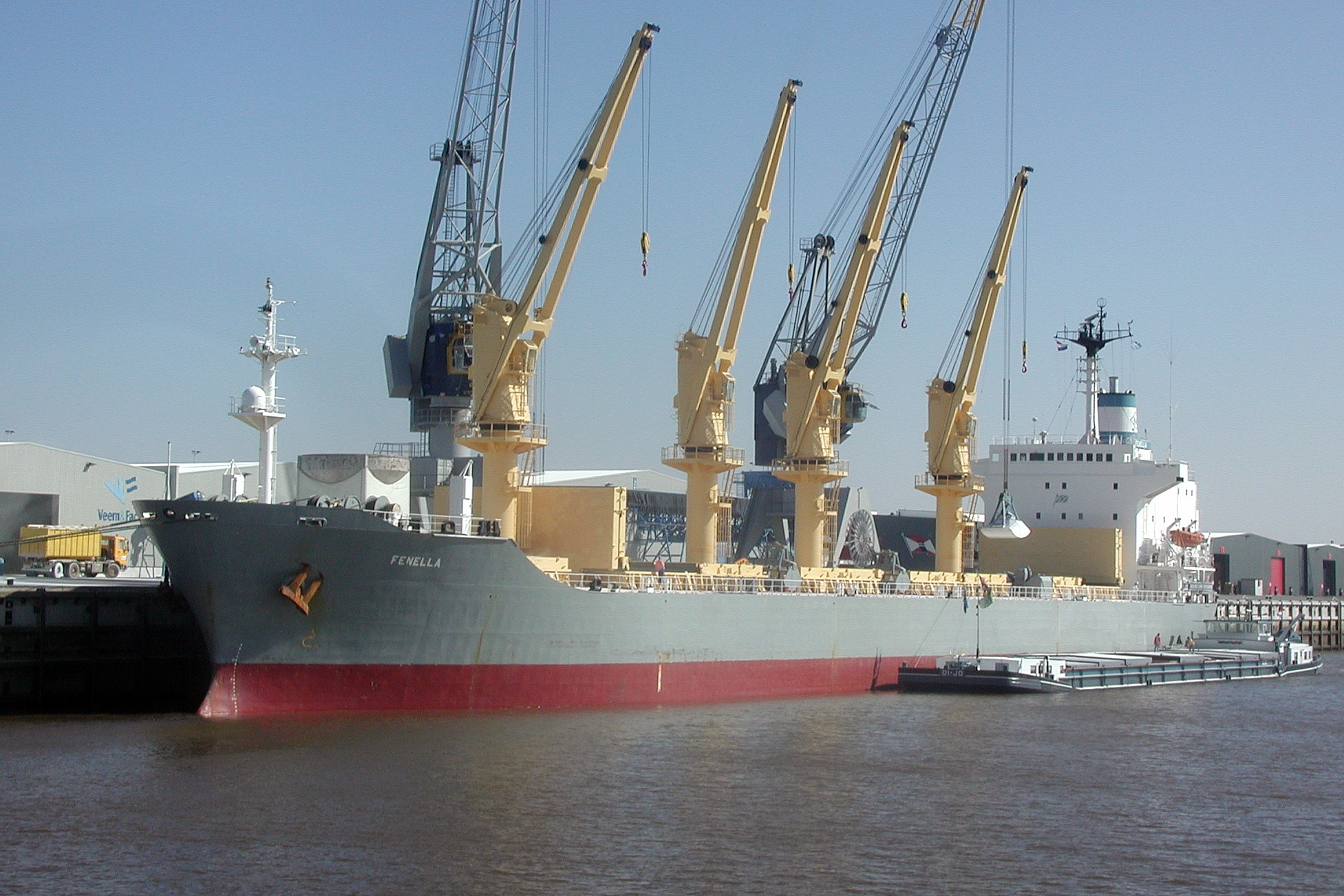
- Fenella discharging Kaolin in Delfzijl, 2002

History
- Name: Fenella (formerly Virginia Rainbow)
- Owner: Mineralien Schiffahrt Spedition & Transport, Schnaittenbach, Germany
- Port of registry: Monrovia (Liberia)
- Ordered: 1986
- Builder: IHI Marine United Tokyo
- Yard number: 2935
- Launched: 25 February 1986
- Completed: 16 May 1986
- Identification: IMO number: 8501581; Callsign: A8YX7
- Fate: Scrapped 2016

General characteristics
- Type: Bulk carrier
- Tonnage: 13,567 GT
- Displacement: 22,969 long tons (23,338 t)
- Length: 159 m
- Beam: 23 m
- Draught: 9.9 m
- Installed power: 6500 bhp
- Propulsion: Pielstick / IHI, type 10PC2-6V-400
- Speed: 14 kn

MV Fenella was a bulk cargo ship owned by Mineralien Schiffahrt Spedition & Transport Schnaittenbach, Germany.

== History ==
The vessel was constructed at Ihi Marine United Tokyo, Japan in 1986. It was initially named Virginia Rainbow for Japanese owner, Tokai Shipping Company. In 1993, the ship was sold to German owners and renamed Fenella, continuing to sail under the Liberia flag.

In 2016, the ship was sold for scrap to Bangladesh. Beaching at Chittagong took place on 10 April 2016.
