= Fenella =

Fenella may refer to:

== People ==
- Fenella Fielding (1927–2018), English actress
- Fenella Fudge (formerly Hadingham), BBC Radio newsreader
- Fenella Kernebone (born 1976), Australian radio and TV presenter
- Fenella Woolgar (born 1969), English actress
- Lady Finella (also spelled Fenella; c. 950–995), noblewoman who killed King Kenneth II

== Fiction ==
- The Fate of Fenella, a Victorian novel by several authors
- A character in Walter Scott's Peveril of the Peak
- The eponymous heroine of Auber's opera La Muette de Portici, who was inspired by Walter Scott's Fenella
- Fenella Melford, a character in Diana Wynne Jones's The Time of the Ghost
- The eponymous subject of the Fenella in ... children's books by David Gentleman
- An anglicization of Fionnuala, daughter of Lir in Irish mythology and Gaelic feminine given name
- Fenella the Kettle Witch, a character from Chorlton and the Wheelies
- Fenella Feverfew, a character in The Worst Witch
- Fenella Rogers (née Guteman), a young American heiress in Agatha Christie's Endless Night (novel)

== Places ==
- Fenella, Ontario, a community in the province of Ontario, Canada
- Fenella Beach, a beach in St Patrick's Isle

== Ships ==
- SS Fenella (1881), a twin-screw Packet Steamer operated by the Isle of Man Steam Packet Company
- SS Fenella (1936), a turbine steamers sunk during the Dunkirk Evacuation
- MV Fenella (1951), a motor cargo vessel operated by the Isle of Man Steam Packet Company
- MV Fenella (1986), a bulk cargo ship owned by Mineralien Schiffahrt Spedition & Transport Schnaittenbach, Germany

== Other ==
- Finella, a genus of sea snails in the family Scaliolidae
- Fenella (sawfly), a genus of insects in the family Tenthredinidae
