= Kevin Fennelly =

Kilkenny hurler and manager

Personal information
- Native name: Caoimhín Ó Fionnalaigh (Irish)
- Born: 7 April 1955 (age 71) Piltown, County Kilkenny, Ireland
- Occupation: Insurance representative
- Height: 6 ft 10 in (208 cm)

Sport
- Sport: Hurling
- Position: Goalkeeper
Club
- Years: Club
- Ballyhale Shamrocks
Club titles
- Kilkenny titles: 9
- Leinster titles: 4
- All-Ireland Titles: 3
Inter-county
- Years: County
- 1978-1990: Kilkenny
Inter-county titles
- Leinster titles: 4
- All-Irelands: 3
- NHL: 2
- All Stars: 0

Kevin Fennelly (born 7 April 1955) is an Irish former hurling manager and former player who played for his local club Ballyhale Shamrocks and at senior level for the Kilkenny county hurling team from the late 1970s until the late 1980s. Fennelly later served as Kilkenny senior hurling manager for the 1998 season, and Dublin manager for the 2001 and 2002 seasons. He lives in Gowran and writes a hurling column in the Sunday World newspaper.

== Early life ==
Kevin Fennelly was born in Piltown, County Kilkenny in 1955. At the age of six his family moved to Ballyhale where his father had bought a farm. From an early age Fennelly and his six brothers – Michael, Ger, Brendan, Liam, Seán and Dermot – all took a great interest in the game of hurling. It was at Ballyhale national school that they first played the game and, in time, all the Fennelly boys would go on to play for club and county.

He is an uncle of the famous Kilkenny hurlers, Michael Fennelly and Colin Fennelly.

== Playing career ==
=== Club ===
In his youth Fennelly quickly became a member of the newly formed Ballyhale Shamrocks club, a club which is father helped to found. He had much success with the club, beginning by winning several minor and under-21 county titles with the club. In 1978 Fennelly was a key member of the senior team when Ballyhale won their first county title. This was later converted into a Leinster club title, however, Ballyhale were narrowly beaten by Blackrock in the All-Ireland final.

Fennelly added two further county medals to his collection in 1979 and 1980. In the latter year he won a second Leinster title before finally winning his first All-Ireland club title at the beginning of 1981. In 1982 and 1983 he won another brace of county championship medals. The 1983 win was once again converted into a Leinster title as well as a second All-Ireland club title at the start of 1984. Fennelly brought his county championship tally up to eight with wins in 1985, 1988 and 1989. In 1989 he also won his fourth Leinster club medal before converting this into his third All-Ireland club title. On the occasion of the final all seven Fennelly brothers lined out for Ballyhale, a record which will probably never be beaten. Fennelly won his ninth county medal with Ballyhale in 1991.

=== Inter-county ===
Fennelly’s hurling skills were quickly noted and he joined the Kilkenny minor hurling panel in the early 1970s. It was a glorious era for the county’s minor hurling team as they dominated the minor provincial championship for the entire decade. He won a Leinster title in this grade in 1971, however, Kilkenny were beaten in the All-Ireland final by Cork. Fennelly won a second provincial title in 1972, however, ‘the Cats’ gained revenge on Cork in the championship decider and Fennelly collected an All-Ireland Minor Hurling Championship medal. He quickly joined the Kilkenny under-21 team where he won back-to-back Leinster and All-Ireland titles in 1974 and 1975. Fennelly won a third provincial under-21 title in 1976, however, Kilkenny were defeated by Cork in the subsequent All-Ireland final.

Fennelly subsequently joined the Kilkenny senior hurling panel, however, he found it difficult to find a regular spot on the team. He won a Leinster title in 1979 before later coming on as a substitute to claim a senior All-Ireland medal. Fennelly won several other Leinster and All-Ireland titles throughout the 1980s but as a substitute. He finally took over as goalkeeper from Noel Skehan and won back-to-back Leinster titles on the field of play in 1986 and 1987. In the latter year his side were defeated by Galway in the All-Ireland final. In spite of this Fennelly won a National Hurling League medal in 1986. Four years later in 1990 he won a second National League medal and he retired from inter-county hurling shortly afterwards.

== Managerial career ==
Kevin Fennelly
Sport
Inter-county management
- Years: Team
- 1997 - 1998 2001 - 2002: Kilkenny; Dublin
Inter-county titles as manager
County	League	Province	All-Ireland
Kilkenny	0	1	1

=== Kilkenny ===
In retirement from playing Fennelly maintained a keen interest in the game. In 1998 he served as manager of the Kilkenny senior hurling team. That year he guided ‘the Cats’ to a first Leinster title since 1993, however, in the second year of the ‘back-door system’ Offaly, the defeated Leinster finalists, later beat Kilkenny in the All-Ireland final. Fennelly resigned following this defeat and was replaced by Brian Cody.

=== Dublin ===
Fennelly was appointed manager of the Dublin Senior Hurling team in November 2001 on a three-year agreement. Following an unsuccessful National League run, Dublin were knocked out of the Leinster Championship by Laois at the quarter-final stage. In the 2002 Championship, Dublin overcame Meath to qualify for a Leinster semi final match against Wexford. They were beaten 3-15 to 2-12. In a qualifier match against Clare, Dublin were soundly beaten 3-22 to 1-08 to put an end to their Championship season. In November 2002, after two years as manager, Fennelly stepped down by mutual agreement.

== Political career ==
Fennelly was elected as a Fianna Fáil member of Kilkenny County Council for the Thomastown Local Electoral Area at the 1991 local elections. He was an unsuccessful candidate for the party at the 1992 general election in the Carlow–Kilkenny constituency. He lost his council seat in the 1999 local elections.

Sporting positions
Preceded by Liam Walsh	Kilkenny Senior Hurling Captain; 1989	Succeeded by Seán Fennelly
Preceded by Nickey Brennan	Kilkenny Senior Hurling Manager; 1997–1998	Succeeded by Brian Cody
Preceded by Michael O'Grady	Dublin Senior Hurling Manager; 2001–2002	Succeeded by Marty Morris
Achievements
Preceded by Ger Fennelly (Kilkenny)	All-Ireland Under-21 Hurling Final winning captain 1975	Succeeded by Tadhg Murphy (Cork)
Preceded by Niall Patterson (Loughgiel Shamrocks)	All-Ireland Senior Club Hurling Final winning captain 1984	Succeeded by Johnny Brennan (St. Martin's)
