= Seán Fennelly =

Irish hurler

Personal information
- Native name: Seán Ó Fionnalaigh (Irish)
- Born: 14 December 1959 (age 66) Piltown, County Kilkenny
- Occupation: Farmer
- Height: 6 ft 2 in (188 cm)

Sport
- Sport: Hurling
- Position: Half-back
Club
- Years: Club
- Ballyhale Shamrocks
Inter-county
- Years: County
- 1986-1990: Kilkenny
Inter-county titles
- Leinster titles: 2
- All-Irelands: 0
- NHL: 1

Seán Fennelly (born 14 December 1959 in Piltown, County Kilkenny) is an Irish former hurler who played with his local club Ballyhale Shamrocks and was a member of the Kilkenny senior inter-county team from 1986 until 1989.

== Biography ==
Seán Fennelly was born in Piltown, County Kilkenny in 1959. The second youngest son of seven born to Kevin Fennelly and the former Teresa Hoyne, he was born into a family that had a huge interest in the game of hurling. At the age of two the entire family moved to Ballyhale where they purchased a farm. Here Fennelly was educated at the local national school where his hurling skills were first noted and honed by the local teachers, Peadar O’Neill and Joe Dunphy. His skills were also honed on the family farm where he, along with his six brothers – Michael, Ger, Kevin, Brendan, Liam and Dermot – trained.

== Playing career ==
=== Club ===
The Fennelly's have a long association with their local Ballyhale Sharmocks club. It was a club which Kevin Fennelly Snr. was instrumental in helping to found in 1972. By 1978 the new club had reached the top of the local hurling world and Fennelly played a key role as Ballyhale captured their first senior county title. This victory allowed the Shamrocks club to represent Kilkenny in the provincial club championship. The final of that competition saw Fennelly's side take on Dublin champions Crumlin. A 1-13 to 1-6 victory gave Fennelly his first Leinster club title. The subsequent All-Ireland club final saw Ballyhale Shamrocks take on Cork's famous Blackrock club. A ten-goal thriller saw Blackrock take the title by 5-7 to 5-5.

Fennelly added two further county medals to his collection to make it three in-a-row in 1979 and 1980. This latter victory was later converted into a Leinster club title following a 3-10 to 1-8 victory over Coolderry of Offaly. Once again Ballyhale Shamrocks reached the All-Ireland final where the star-studded St. Finbarr's club from Cork provided the opposition. On that occasion all seven Fennelly brothers lined out in an exciting contest. The sides were level on five occasions during the opening thirty minutes; however, the Shamrocks had the edge. At the full-time whistle Ballyhale were the winners by -15 to 1-11 and Fennelly collected his first All-Ireland club medal along with his six brothers.

Another brace of county championship victories followed for Fennelly in 1982 and 1983. Once again this latter victory was later converted into a Leinster club title following a six-point victory over Kinnitty of Offaly. Ballyhale later qualified for the All-Ireland final where Galway champions Gort were the opponents. That game ended in 1-10 apiece draw thanks to a last-minute equalizing point by Dermot Fennelly. The replay took place some time later with Ger Fennelly playing a starring role. His first-half goal was the deciding factor as Ballyhale won the day by 1-10 to 0-7. It was Fennelly's second All-Ireland club medal.

The rest of the 1980s saw Fennelly bring his county championship tally up to eight with further wins in 1985, 1988 and 1989. The third of these victories was subsequently converted into fourth Leinster club title following a trouncing of the Cuala club from Dublin. Ballyhale later qualified for the All-Ireland final where Limerick and Munster representatives Ballybrown were the opponents. Ballybrown stormed into a six-point lead during the first-half before Fennelly scored a goal in the twenty-fourth minute. At half-time Ballybrown still led by four points, however, a surge by Ballyhale saw the Kilkenny side claim a 1-16 to 0-16 victory. It was Fennelly's third All-Ireland medal.

=== Minor & under-21 ===
Fennelly first came to prominence on the inter-county scene in the mid-1970s as a member of the Kilkenny minor hurling team. He was honoured in 1977 in his first full season with the team when he was appointed captain. That year Fennelly captured a Leinster title when Kilkenny recorded a comprehensive 5-10 to 3-6 victory over Wexford. The subsequent All-Ireland championship decider saw Kilkenny take on Cork. An exciting game ensued; however, at full-time both sides couldn't be separated as Kilkenny finished with 4-8 while Cork finished with 3-11. The replay was less exciting, however, Kilkenny eked out a victory by 1-8 to 0-9. Fennelly thus collected an All-Ireland minor medal and had the honour of collecting the cup on behalf of his county.

Fennelly later joined the Kilkenny under-21 panel where he enjoyed some more success. He won a Leinster title in this grade in 1980 following a 2-14 to 2-9 victory over near neighbours Wexford. The subsequent All-Ireland final pitted Tipperary against Kilkenny for the first time ever in the under-21 grade. A close and tense affair developed between these two teams, however, at the full-time whistle Tipp were the one-point winners by 2-9 to 0-14.

=== Senior ===
In 1983 Fennelly tasted his first major success with the Kilkenny senior hurling team. That year he collected a National Hurling League medal following a two-point victory over Limerick. Fennelly, however, found it difficult to nail down a starting place on the championship team that already contained his two brothers Liam and Ger.

Kilkenny's fortunes took a downturn in the mid-1980s as Offaly won a number of Leinster titles while Kilkenny were in the doldrums. ‘The Cats’ bounced back in 1986 with Fennelly collecting a second National League medal before nailing down a place on the championship fifteen. He later lined out in his first senior provincial decider against Offaly. A comprehensive 4-10 to 1-11 victory gave Fennelly his first Leinster winners’ medal. Following this win Kilkenny were firm favourites for the All-Ireland title, however, Galway got the better of them in the All-Ireland semi-final with a 4-12 to 0-13 victory.

In 1987 Kilkenny qualified for the provincial decider once again with Offaly providing the opposition. The game developed into a close affair; however, victory went to ‘the Cats’ by 2-14 to 0-17. It was Fennelly's second consecutive Leinster title. This victory allowed Kilkenny to advance directly to the All-Ireland final. Galway provided the opposition on that occasion, however, the game turned out to be a drab affair. A goal by substitute Noel Lane with seven minutes left to play gave Galway the edge and they hung on to win by 1-12 to 0-9.

== Honours ==
=== Ballyhale Shamrocks ===
- All-Ireland Senior Club Hurling Championship:
  - Winner (2): 1981, 1984, 1990
  - Runner-up (1): 1979
- Leinster Senior Club Hurling Championship:
  - Winner (4): 1978, 1980, 1983, 1989
  - Runner-up (2): 1988, 1991
- Kilkenny Senior Hurling Championship:
  - Winner (9): 1978, 1979, 1980, 1982, 1983, 1985, 1988, 1989, 1991
  - Runner-up (3): 1984, 1986, 1987

Sporting positions
Preceded by Kevin Fennelly	Kilkenny Senior Hurling Captain; 1990	Succeeded by Christy Heffernan
Achievements
Preceded by Joe Hogan (Tipperary)	All-Ireland Minor Hurling Final winning captain 1977	Succeeded by Pat Murphy (Cork)
