= Liam Fennelly =

Irish sportsperson (born 1958)

Personal information
- Native name: Liam Ó Fionnalaigh (Irish)
- Born: 1 January 1958 (age 68) Piltown, County Kilkenny, Ireland
- Occupation: Sales representative
- Height: 6 ft 0 in (183 cm)

Sport
- Sport: Hurling
- Position: Forward
Club
- Years: Club
- 1970s-1990s: Ballyhale Shamrocks
Club titles
- Kilkenny titles: 9
- All-Ireland Titles: 2
Inter-county
Years	County	Apps (scores)
1981-1992	Kilkenny	31 (21-21)
Inter-county titles
- Leinster titles: 6
- All-Irelands: 3
- All Stars: 4

Liam Fennelly (born 1 January 1958 in Piltown, County Kilkenny, Ireland) is an Irish retired sportsperson. He played hurling with his local club Ballyhale Shamrocks and was a member of the Kilkenny senior inter-county team from 1981 until 1992.

== Biography ==
Liam Fennelly was born in Piltown, County Kilkenny in 1958. The fifth eldest son of Kevin Fennelly and the former Teresa Hoyne, he was born into a family that had a huge interest in the game of hurling. At the age of three the entire family moved to Ballyhale where they purchased a farm. Here Fennelly was educated at the local national school where his hurling skills were first noted and honed by the local teachers, Peadar O’Neill and Joe Dunphy. His skills were also honed on the family farm where he, along with his six brothers – Michael, Ger, Kevin, Brendan, Seán and Dermot – trained.

== Playing career ==
=== Club ===
The Fennellys have a long association with their local Ballyhale Shamrocks club. It was a club which Kevin Fennelly Snr. was instrumental in helping to found in 1972. By 1978 the new club had reached the top of the local hurling world and Fennelly played a key role as Ballyhale captured their first senior county title. This victory allowed the Shamrocks club to represent Kilkenny in the provincial club championship. The final of that competition saw Fennelly’s side take on Dublin champions Crumlin. A 1-13 to 1-6 victory gave Fennelly his first Leinster club title. The subsequent All-Ireland club final saw Ballyhale Shamrocks take on Cork’s famous Blackrock club. A ten-goal thriller saw Blackrock take the title by 5-7 to 5-5.

Fennelly added two further county medals to his collection to make it three in-a-row in 1979 and 1980. This latter victory was later converted into a Leinster club title following a 3-10 to 1-8 victory over Coolderry of Offaly. Once again Ballyhale Shamrocks reached the All-Ireland final where the star-studded St. Finbarr’s club from Cork provided the opposition. On that occasion all seven Fennelly brothers lined out in an exciting contest. The sides were level on five occasions during the opening thirty minutes; however, the Shamrocks had the edge. At the full-time whistle Ballyhale were the winners by -15 to 1-11 and Fennelly collected his first All-Ireland club medal along with his six brothers.

Another brace of county championship victories followed for Fennelly in 1982 and 1983. Once again this latter victory was later converted into a Leinster club title following a six-point victory over Kinnitty of Offaly. Ballyhale later qualified for the All-Ireland final where Galway champions Gort were the opponents. That game ended in 1-10 apiece draw thanks to a last-minute equalizing point by Dermot Fennelly. The replay took place some time later with Ger Fennelly playing a starring role. His first-half goal was the deciding factor as Ballyhale won the day by 1-10 to 0-7. It was Fennelly’s second All-Ireland club medal.

The rest of the 1980s saw Fennelly bring his county championship tally up to eight with further wins in 1985, 1988 and 1989. The third of these victories was subsequently converted into fourth Leinster club title following a trouncing of the Cuala club from Dublin. Ballyhale later qualified for the All-Ireland final where Limerick and Munster representatives Ballybrown were the opponents. Ballybrown stormed into a six-point lead in the middle of the first-half before Fennelly scored a goal in the twenty-fourth minute. At half-time Ballybrown still led by four points, however, a surge by Ballyhale saw the Kilkenny side claim a 1-16 to 0-16 victory. It was Fennelly’s third All-Ireland medal.

Fennelly won his ninth and final county medal with Ballyhale in 1991.

=== Minor & under-21 ===
Fennelly first came to prominence on the inter-county scene in the mid-1970s as a member of the Kilkenny minor hurling team. He won a Leinster title in this grade in 1976 when Kilkenny recorded a respectable 2-14 to 1-8 victory over Wexford. The subsequent All-Ireland championship decider saw Kilkenny take on Tipperary. The game was a complete disaster from a Kilkenny viewpoint as Tipp were overwhelming winners by 2-20 to 1-7.

Fennelly later joined the Kilkenny under-21 panel where he won both Leinster and All-Ireland titles as a non-playing substitute.

=== Senior ===
Fennelly made his debut on the Kilkenny senior team in 1981; however, Offaly had emerged as the new force in Leinster.

In 1982 Fennelly tasted his first major victory with the senior outfit when he captured a National Hurling League title. He later lined out in Croke Park in his very first Leinster final. Offaly, the reigning provincial and All-Ireland champions were the opponents on that occasion and an interesting game developed. After a close seventy minutes of hurling Kilkenny emerged victorious by just two points and Fennelly collected his first Leinster winners’ medal. He subsequently lined out in the All-Ireland championship decider against Cork. Christy Heffernan was the hero of the day as he scored two goals in a forty-second spell just before half-time. Fennelly’s brother, Ger, captured a third goal in the second half as Kilkenny completely trounced ‘the Rebels’ by 3-18 to 1-15. This victory gave Fennelly his first All-Ireland medal.

In 1983 Fennelly had the great honour of being appointed captain of the Kilkenny team. It also turned out to be one of his best seasons to date in the black and amber jersey. He began the year by capturing a second consecutive National League victory before lining out in the Leinster final against Offaly. It was their second consecutive meeting in the provincial decider, however, on this occasion the victory was more comprehensive on this occasion. A 1-17 to 0-13 win gave Fennelly his second Leinster medal. For the second year in-a-row ‘the Cats’ squared up to Cork in the All-Ireland final. Once again Kilkenny dominated the game, assisted by a strong wind in the first-half, and hung on in the face of a great fight-back by Cork. At the full-time whistle Kilkenny emerged victorious by 2-14 to 2-12. It was Fennelly’s second All-Ireland medal while he also had the honour of collecting the Liam MacCarthy Cup. He was later presented with his first All-Star award.

Kilkenny’s fortunes took a downturn following this victory as Offaly won the next two Leinster titles. In spite of this Fennelly was Kilkenny’s best player in 1985 and he was duly presented with a second All-Star. ‘The Cats’ bounced back in 1986 with Fennelly collecting a third National League medal before playing in the provincial decider against Offaly. A comprehensive 4-10 to 1-11 victory gave Fennelly his third Leinster winners’ medal. Following this win Kilkenny were firm favourites for the All-Ireland title, however, Galway got the better of them in the All-Ireland semi-final with a 4-12 to 0-13 victory.

In 1987 Kilkenny qualified for the provincial decider once again with Offaly providing the opposition. The game developed into a close affair; however, victory went to ‘the Cats’ by 2-14 to 0-17. It was Fennelly’s fourth Leinster title. This victory allowed Kilkenny to advance to play Antrim in the all Ireland semi final. After a close affair in Dundalk, Kilkenny progressed to the all Ireland final. Galway provided the opposition on that occasion, however, the game turned out to be a drab affair. A goal by substitute Noel Lane with seven minutes to give Galway the edge and they hung on to win by 1-12 to 0-9. Fennelly was later honoured with his third All-Star award.

Kilkenny went into decline following this defeat. After a defeat in the provincial decider of 1989 Fennelly won a fourth National League medal in 1990 before his side were back in the Leinster final again two years later. Dublin provided the opposition on that occasion; however, they proved to be no pushovers. With seconds left in the game ‘the Dubs’ were winning by a single point, however, a last-gasp goal sealed a 1-11 to 0-13 victory for ‘the Cats’. It was Fennelly’s fifth Leinster winners’ medal. Another nail-biting win over Antrim in similar circumstances set up an All-Ireland final meeting with Tipperary, their first championship encounter in twenty years. The opening thirty-five minutes saw both sides trade score-for-score, however, a controversial 2-metre free, miss-hit by Michael Cleary, landed in the net and gave Tipp a lead which they never surrendered. The final score of 1-16 to 0-15 resulted in a loss for Kilkenny.

In 1992 Fennelly was one of the veterans of the Kilkenny team; however, he was appointed captain of the team for the third time that year. That year’s Leinster final pitted Kilkenny against Wexford. The game was an easy one for ‘the Cats’ as Kilkenny’s side won easily by 3-16 to 2-9. It was Fennelly’s sixth Leinster medal and his second occasion lifting the Bob O’Keeffe Cup. The subsequent All-Ireland final saw Fennelly line out against Cork for the third time in his career. Prior to the game Kilkenny won the toss, however, Fennelly chose to play against the wind. At half-time his side were only two points in arrears thanks to a D.J. Carey goal four minutes before the interval. John Power and Michael Phelan added two second-half goals to give Fennelly a 3-10 to 1-12 win. It was Fennelly’s second time lifting the Liam MacCarthy Cup and his third All-Ireland title. He retired from inter-county hurling shortly afterwards.

In 2010, Liam Fennelly was selected as full forward on the Kilkenny 125yrs team - organised through the 'Kilkenny People' newspaper. This honour is a reflection of the excellence that this scion of a famous clan brought to his time in the black & amber.

Sporting positions
Preceded by Brian Cody	Kilkenny Senior Hurling Captain; 1983-1984	Succeeded by Kieran Brennan
Preceded by Christy Heffernan	Kilkenny Senior Hurling Captain; 1992	Succeeded by Eddie O'Connor
Achievements
Preceded by Brian Cody (Kilkenny)	All-Ireland Senior Hurling winning captain 1983	Succeeded by John Fenton (Cork)
Preceded by Declan Carr (Tipperary)	All-Ireland Senior Hurling winning captain 1992	Succeeded by Eddie O'Connor (Kilkenny)
