= List of Kilkenny county hurling team seasons =

Season	All-Ireland Championship	Leinster Championship	National Hurling League	Top SHC scorer	Coach(es)
1962		Runner-up	Winner		Fr. Tommy Maher
1963	Winner	Winner	Semi-finalist		Fr. Tommy Maher
1964	Runner-up	Winner	Group stage		Fr. Tommy Maher
1965		Runner-up	Runner-up		Fr. Tommy Maher
1966	Runner-up	Winner	Winner		Fr. Tommy Maher
1967	Winner	Winner	Runner-up		Fr. Tommy Maher
1968		Runner-up	Runner-up		Fr. Tommy Maher
1969	Winner	Winner	Group stage		Fr. Tommy Maher
1970		Runner-up	Group stage		Fr. Tommy Maher
1971	Runner-up	Winner	Group stage		Fr. Tommy Maher
1972	Winner	Winner	Semi-finalist		Fr. Tommy Maher
1973	Runner-up	Winner	Semi-finalist		Fr. Tommy Maher
1974	Winner	Winner	Group stage		Fr. Tommy Maher
1975	Winner	Winner	Group stage		Fr. Tommy Maher
1976		Runner-up	Winner		Fr. Tommy Maher
1977		Runner-up	Runner-up		Fr. Tommy Maher
1978	Runner-up	Winner	Runner-up		Fr. Tommy Maher
1979	Winner	Winner	Group stage		Pat Henderson; Eddie Keher
1980		Runner-up	Group stage		Pat Henderson; Eddie Keher
1981		Semi-finalist	Group stage		Phil Larkin
1982	Winner	Winner	Winner		Pat Henderson
1983	Winner	Winner	Winner		Pat Henderson
1984		Semi-finalist	Group stage		Pat Henderson
1985		Semi-finalist	Group stage		Pat Henderson
1986	Semi-finalist	Winner	Winner		Pat Henderson
1987	Runner-up	Winner	Group stage		Pat Henderson
1988		Semi-finalist	Group stage		Eddie Keher
1989		Runner-up	Semi-finalist		Dermot Healy
1990		Semi-finalist	Winner		Dermot Healy
1991	Runner-up	Winner	Semi-finalist		Ollie Walsh
1992	Winner	Winner	Group stage		Ollie Walsh
1993	Winner	Winner	Group stage		Ollie Walsh
1994		Semi-finalist	Group stage		Ollie Walsh
1995		Semi-finalist	Semi-finalist		Ollie Walsh
1996		Semi-finalist	Semi-finalist		Nickey Brennan
1997	Semi-finalist	Runner-up	Semi-finalist		Nickey Brennan
1998	Runner-up	Winner	Group stage		Kevin Fennelly
1999	Runner-up	Winner	Semi-finalist		Brian Cody
2000	Winner	Winner	Group stage		Brian Cody
2001	Semi-finalist	Winner	Semi-finalist		Brian Cody
2002	Winner	Winner	Winner		Brian Cody
2003	Winner	Winner	Winner		Brian Cody
2004	Runner-up	Semi-finalist	Semi-finalist		Brian Cody
2005	Semi-finalist	Winner	Winner	Henry Shefflin (3-37)	Brian Cody
2006	Winner	Winner	Winner	Henry Shefflin (2-46)	Brian Cody
2007	Winner	Winner	Runner-up	Henry Shefflin (1-45)	Brian Cody
2008	Winner	Winner	Semi-finalist	Henry Shefflin (1-37)	Brian Cody
2009	Winner	Winner	Winner		Brian Cody
2010	Runner-up	Winner	Group stage		Brian Cody
