= List of All-Ireland Senior Hurling Championship winning managers =

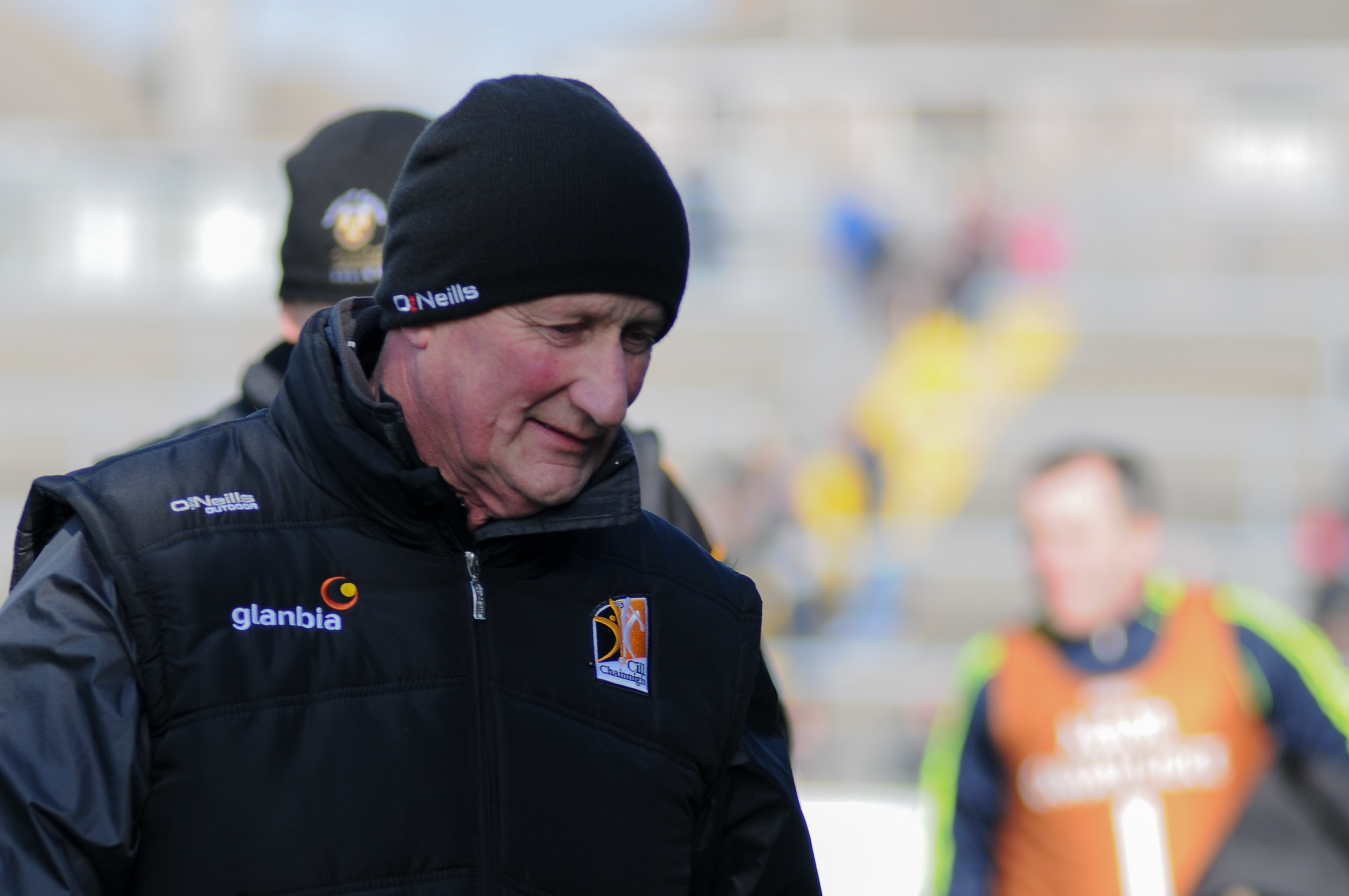
Brian Cody managed Kilkenny to 11 All-Ireland SHCs between 2000 and 2015.

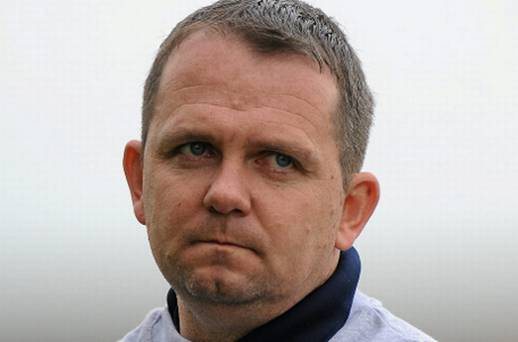
Davy Fitzgerald managed Clare to the 2013 All-Ireland Senior Hurling Championship, and has also managed Waterford and Wexford.

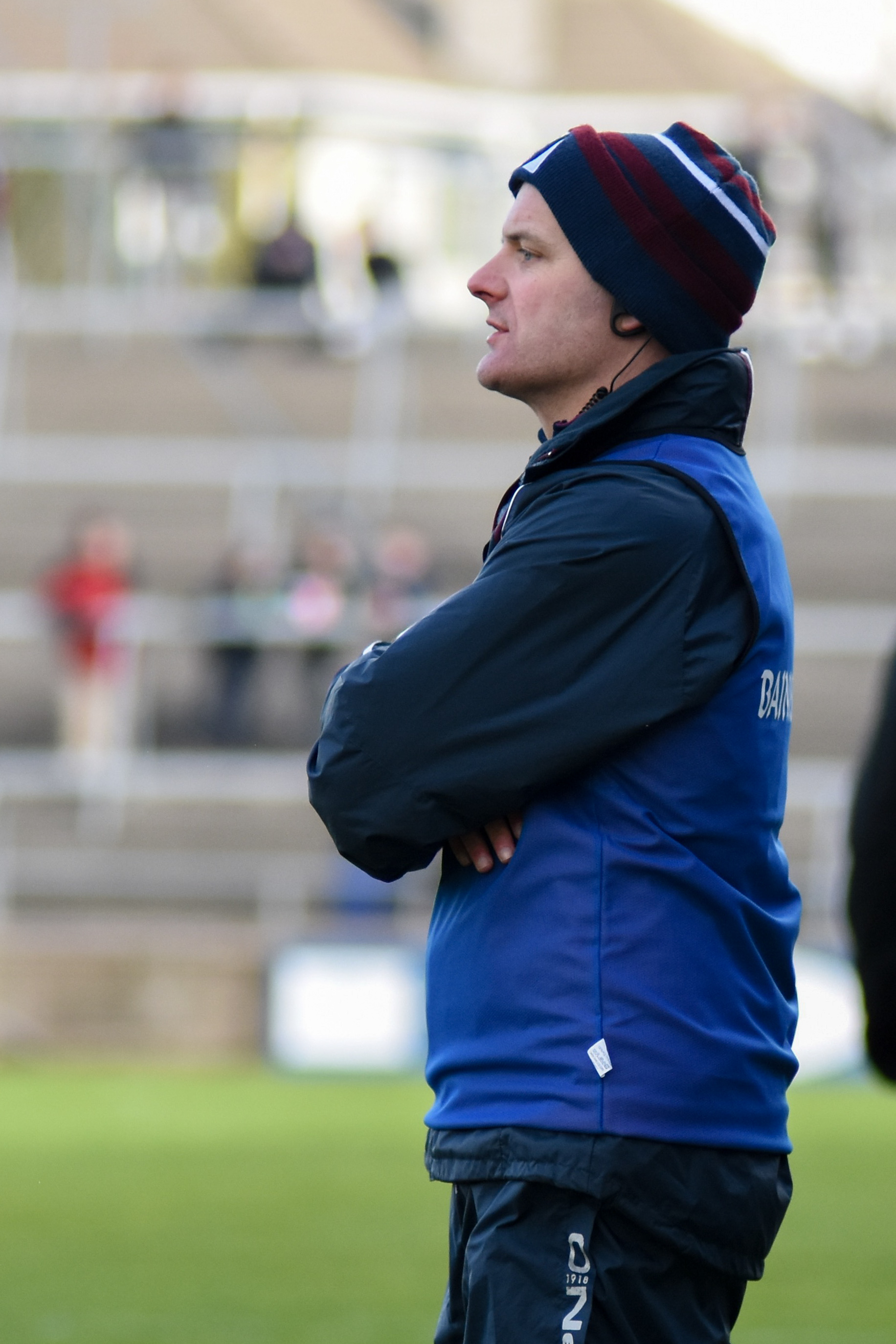
Micheál Donoghue managed Galway to the 2017 All-Ireland Senior Hurling Championship.

This is a list of All-Ireland Senior Hurling Championship winning managers. The term manager (or coach) only came into widespread use in the 1970s. Up until then hurling teams were usually run by selection panels. Sometimes they contained up to ten members, resulting in self-interest coming to the fore more often than not. All this changed with the appointment of a strong manager, surrounded by a small group of selectors.

Brian Cody of Kilkenny leads the way in terms of All-Ireland wins. He has guided his native county to seven championship titles in ten years. This culminated in the capturing of a famous four-in-a-row between 2006 and 2009. This feat has only been equalled once before, when Cork won four in a row from 1941 to 1944, but this was in a time when selection panels rather than individual managers looked after teams, making Cody's feat unequalled in the modern era.

Monsignor Thomas Maher, managed Kilkenny to 7 All Ireland titles: 1957, 1963, 1967, 1969, 1972, 1974 and 1975. After such success & coaching Tommy Maher became known as the godfather of modern hurling.

Offaly is the only team that has won all of its All-Ireland titles under the management of a non-native. In 1981 and 1985 Dermot Healy, a native of Kilkenny, became the first "outsider" manager when he guided Offaly to the All-Ireland titles. In 1994 Éamonn Cregan steered the county to victory over his native Limerick in the All-Ireland final. Four years later in 1998 Michael Bond took over from Michael "Babs" Keating, another non-native, and guided Offaly to their fourth All-Ireland championship win.

== By year ==
| Year | Winning coach(es) | Team | Score | Opponent | Losing coach(es) | Sources |
|---|---|---|---|---|---|---|
| 1980 | Cyril Farrell | Galway | 2-15 : 3-9 | Limerick | Noel Drumgoole | |
| 1981 | Dermot Healy | Offaly | 2-12 : 0-15 | Galway | Cyril Farrell | |
| 1982 | Pat Henderson | Kilkenny | 3-18 : 1-13 | Cork | Gerald McCarthy | |
| 1983 | Pat Henderson (2) | Kilkenny | 2-14 : 2-12 | Cork | Johnny Clifford | |
| 1984 | Justin McCarthy; Fr. Michael O'Brien | Cork | 3-16 : 1-12 | Offaly | Dermot Healy | |
| 1985 | Dermot Healy | Offaly | 2-11 : 1-12 | Galway | Cyril Farrell | |
| 1986 | Johnny Clifford | Cork | 4-13 : 2-15 | Galway | Cyril Farrell | |
| 1987 | Cyril Farrell (2) | Galway | 1-12 : 0-9 | Kilkenny | Pat Henderson | |
| 1988 | Cyril Farrell (3) | Galway | 1-15 : 0-14 | Tipperary | Babs Keating | |
| 1989 | Babs Keating | Tipperary | 4-24 : 3-9 | Antrim | Jim Nelson | |
| 1990 | Fr. Michael O'Brien (2) | Cork | 5-15 : 2-21 | Galway | Cyril Farrell | |
| 1991 | Babs Keating (2) | Tipperary | 1-16 : 0-15 | Kilkenny | Ollie Walsh | |
| 1992 | Ollie Walsh | Kilkenny | 3-10 : 1-12 | Cork | Fr. Michael O'Brien | |
| 1993 | Ollie Walsh (2) | Kilkenny | 2-17 : 1-15 | Galway | Cyril Farrell | |
| 1994 | Éamonn Cregan | Offaly | 3-16 : 2-13 | Limerick | Tom Ryan | |
| 1995 | Ger Loughnane | Clare | 1-13 : 2-8 | Offaly | Éamonn Cregan | |
| 1996 | Liam Griffin | Wexford | 1-13 : 0-14 | Limerick | Tom Ryan | |
| 1997 | Ger Loughnane (2) | Clare | 0-20 : 2-13 | Tipperary | Len Gaynor | |
| 1998 | Michael Bond | Offaly | 2-16 : 1-13 | Kilkenny | Kevin Fennelly | |
| 1999 | Jimmy Barry-Murphy | Cork | 0-13 : 0-12 | Kilkenny | Brian Cody | |
| 2000 | Brian Cody | Kilkenny | 5-15 : 1-14 | Offaly | Pat Fleury | |
| 2001 | Nicky English | Tipperary | 2-18 : 2-15 | Galway | Noel Lane | |
| 2002 | Brian Cody (2) | Kilkenny | 2-20 : 0-19 | Clare | Cyril Lyons | |
| 2003 | Brian Cody (3) | Kilkenny | 1-14 : 1-11 | Cork | Dónal O'Grady | |
| 2004 | Dónal O'Grady | Cork | 0-17 : 0-9 | Kilkenny | Brian Cody | |
| 2005 | John Allen | Cork | 1-21 : 1-16 | Galway | Conor Hayes | |
| 2006 | Brian Cody (4) | Kilkenny | 1-16 : 1-13 | Cork | John Allen | |
| 2007 | Brian Cody (5) | Kilkenny | 2-19 : 1-15 | Limerick | Richie Bennis | |
| 2008 | Brian Cody (6) | Kilkenny | 3-30 : 1-13 | Waterford | Davy FitzGerald | |
| 2009 | Brian Cody (7) | Kilkenny | 2-22 : 0-23 | Tipperary | Liam Sheedy | |
| 2010 | Liam Sheedy | Tipperary | 4-17 : 1-18 | Kilkenny | Brian Cody | |
| 2011 | Brian Cody (8) | Kilkenny | 2-17 : 1-16 | Tipperary | Declan Ryan | |
| 2012 | Brian Cody (9) | Kilkenny | 3-22 : 3-11 | Galway | Anthony Cunningham | |
| 2013 | Davy Fitzgerald | Clare | 5-16 : 3-16 | Cork | Jimmy Barry-Murphy | |
| 2014 | Brian Cody (10) | Kilkenny | 2-17 : 2-14 | Tipperary | Eamon O'Shea | |
| 2015 | Brian Cody (11) | Kilkenny | 1-22 : 1-18 | Galway | Anthony Cunningham | |
| 2016 | Michael Ryan | Tipperary | 2-29 : 2-20 | Kilkenny | Brian Cody | |
| 2017 | Micheál Donoghue | Galway | 0-26 : 2-17 | Waterford | Derek McGrath | |
| 2018 | John Kiely | Limerick | 3-16 : 2-18 | Galway | David Burke | |
| 2019 | Liam Sheedy | Tipperary | 3-25 : 0-20 | Kilkenny | Brian Cody | |
| 2020 | John Kiely | Limerick | 0-30 : 0-19 | Waterford | Liam Cahill | |
| 2021 | John Kiely | Limerick | 3-32 : 1-22 | Cork | Kieran Kingston | |
| 2022 | John Kiely | Limerick | 1-31 : 2-26 | Kilkenny | Brian Cody | |

== See also ==
- List of All-Ireland Senior Football Championship winning managers
