= List of Kilkenny senior hurling team managers =

== Kilkenny managerial history ==
| Name | Club | From | To | All-Ireland SHC titles | Leinster SHC titles | National League titles |
|---|---|---|---|---|---|---|
| Fr. Tommy Maher | Skeoughvosteen, Milltown, Co. Kilkenny, Ireland | 1957 | 1978 | 1957, 1963, 1967, 1969, 1972, 1974, 1975 | 1957, 1958, 1959, 1963, 1964, 1966, 1967, 1969, 1971, 1972, 1973, 1974, 1975, 1978 | 1962, 1966, 1976 |
| Pat Henderson/ Eddie Keher | Fenians Johnstown/ Rower-Inistioge | 1978 | 1980 | 1979 | 1979 | |
| Phil 'Fan' Larkin | James Stephens | 1980 | 1981 | | | |
| Pat Henderson | Fenians Johnstown | 1981 | 1987 | 1982, 1983 | 1982, 1983, 1986, 1987 | 1982, 1983, 1986 |
| Eddie Keher | Rower-Instioge | 1987 | 1988 | | | |
| Dermot Healy | Conahy Shamrocks | 1988 | 1990 | | | 1990 |
| Ollie Walsh | Thomastown | 1990 | 1995 | 1992, 1993 | 1991, 1992, 1993 | 1995 |
| Nickey Brennan | Conahy Shamrocks | 1995 | 1997 | | | |
| Kevin Fennelly | Ballyhale Shamrocks | 1997 | 1998 | | 1998 | |
| Brian Cody | James Stephens | 1998 | 2022 | 2000, 2002, 2003, 2006, 2007, 2008, 2009, 2011, 2012, 2014, 2015 | 1999, 2000, 2001, 2002, 2003, 2005, 2006, 2007, 2008, 2009, 2010, 2011, 2014, 2015, 2016, 2020 | 2002, 2003, 2005, 2006, 2009, 2012, 2013, 2014, 2018, 2021 |
| Derek Lyng | Emeralds | 2023 | 2026 | | 2023, 2024, 2025 | |
| Henry Shefflin | Ballyhale Shamrocks | 2027 | | | | |
