= List of All-Ireland Senior Football Championship winning managers =

This is a list of All-Ireland Senior Football Championship winning managers since 1986. The term manager (or coach) only came into widespread use in the 1970s. Up until then football teams were usually run by selection panels. Sometimes they contained up to ten members, resulting in self-interest coming to the fore more often than not. All this changed with the appointment of a strong manager, surrounded by a small group of selectors.

== By year ==
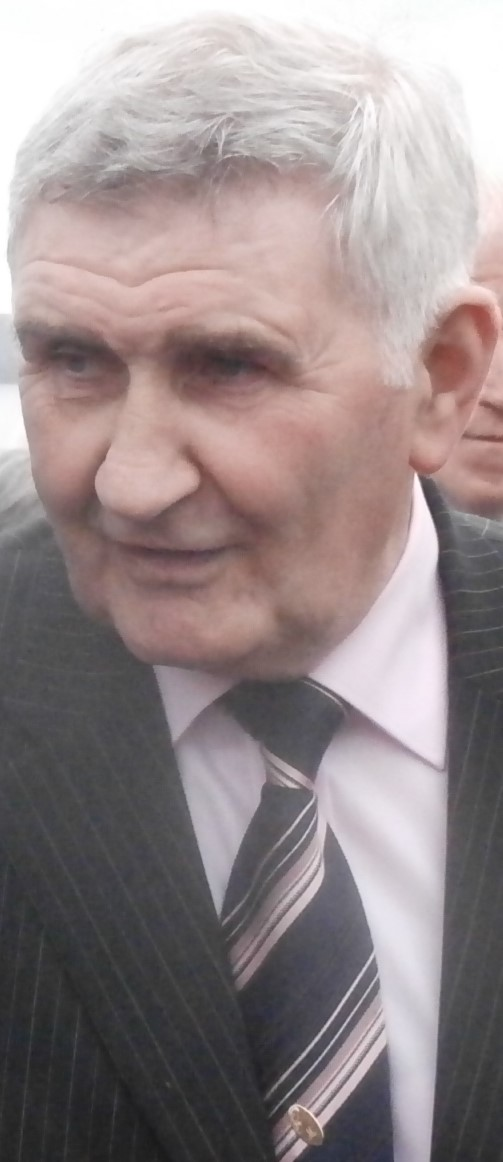
Mick O'Dwyer holds the record for most titles won as manager (8). The last title dates from 1986.

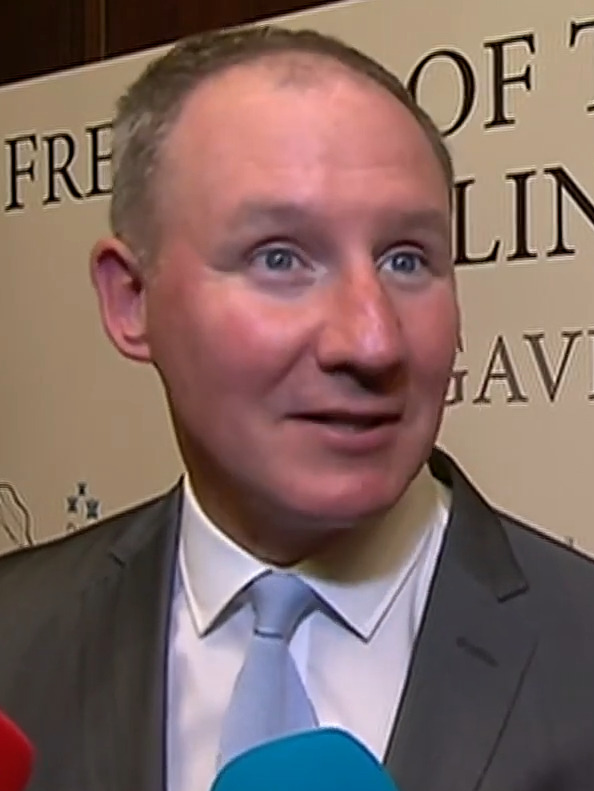
Jim Gavin holds the record for most titles won consecutively as manager (5). The last title dates from 2019.

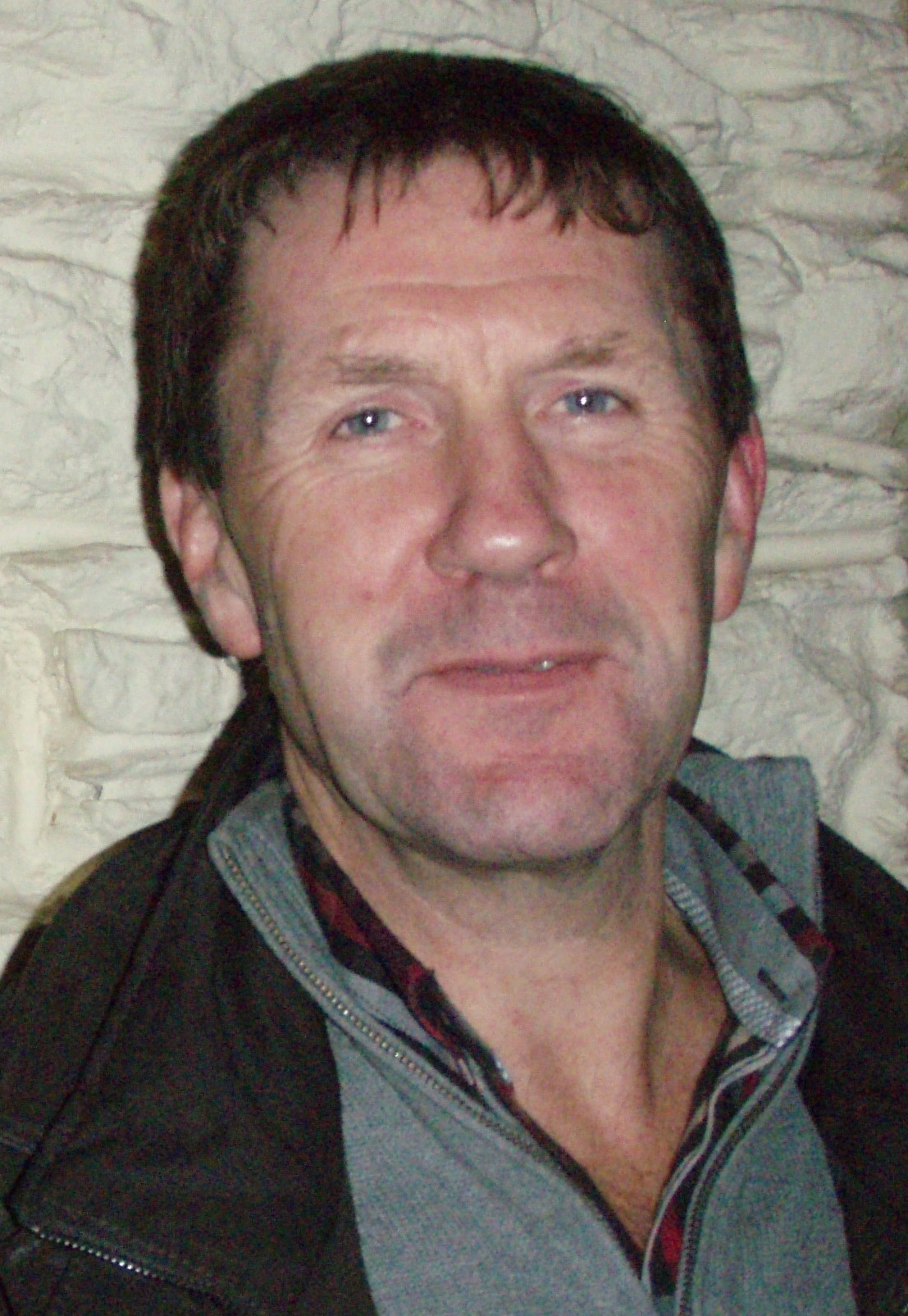
Jack O'Connor won five titles in three different spells as Kerry manager.

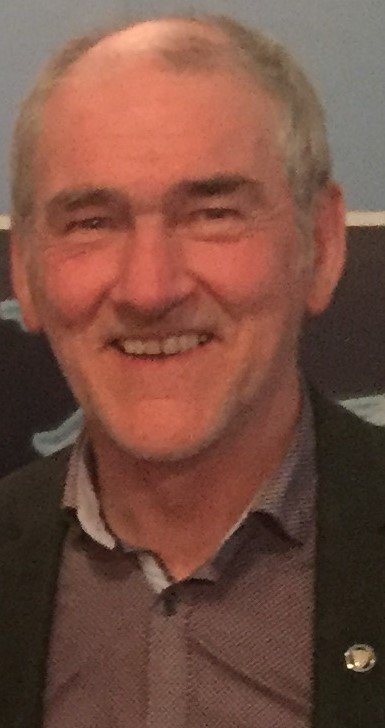
Mickey Harte won three titles as Tyrone manager in the 2000s.

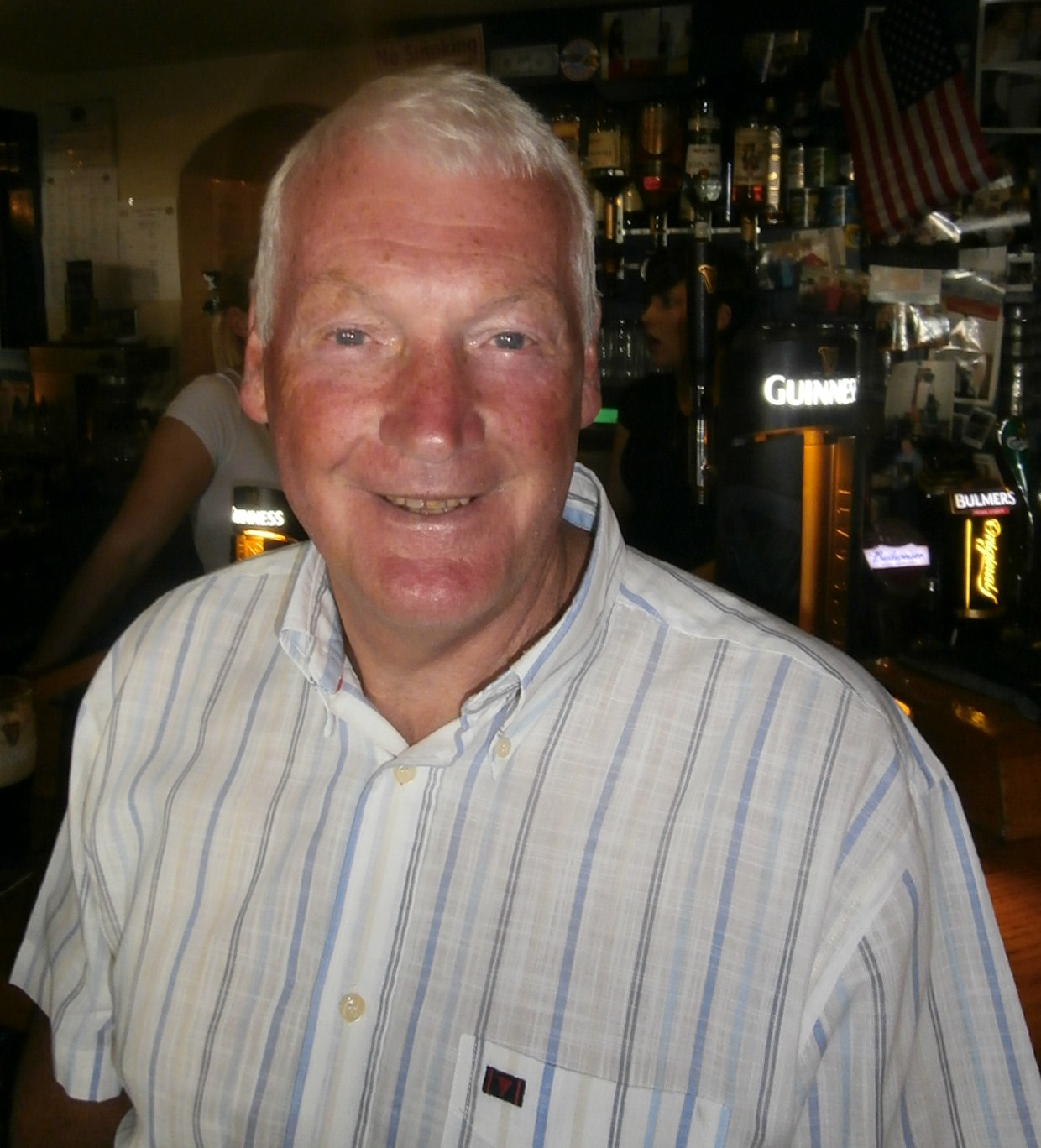
Billy Morgan won consecutive titles as Cork manager in 1989 and 1990.

Year	Winning coach(es)	Team	Score	Opponent	Losing coach(es)	Sources
1981	Mick O'Dwyer (5)	Kerry	1-12 : 0-8	Offaly	Eugene McGee	
1982	Eugene McGee	Offaly	1-15 : 0-17	Kerry	Mick O'Dwyer	
1983	Kevin Heffernan (3)	Dublin	1-10 : 1-8	Galway	Mattie McDonagh	
1984	Mick O'Dwyer (6)	Kerry	0-14 : 1-6	Dublin	Kevin Heffernan	
1985	Mick O'Dwyer (7)	Kerry	2-12 : 2-8	Dublin	Kevin Heffernan	
1986	Mick O'Dwyer (8)	Kerry	2-15 : 1-10	Tyrone	Art McRory	
1987	Seán Boylan	Meath	1-14 : 0-11	Cork	Billy Morgan	
1988	Seán Boylan (2)	Meath	0-13 : 0-12	Cork	Billy Morgan	
1989	Billy Morgan	Cork	0-17 : 1-11	Mayo	John O'Mahony	
1990	Billy Morgan (2)	Cork	0-11 : 0-09	Meath	Seán Boylan	
1991	Pete McGrath	Down	1-16 : 1-14	Meath	Seán Boylan	
1992	Brian McEniff	Donegal	0-18 : 0-14	Dublin	Pat O'Neill	
1993	Eamonn Coleman	Derry	1-14 : 2-08	Cork	Billy Morgan	
1994	Pete McGrath (2)	Down	1-12 : 0-13	Dublin	Pat O'Neill	
1995	Pat O'Neill	Dublin	1-10 : 0-12	Tyrone	Art McRory, Eugene McKenna	
1996	Seán Boylan (3)	Meath	2-09 : 1-11	Mayo	John Maughan	
1997	Páidí Ó Sé	Kerry	0-13 : 1-07	Mayo	John Maughan	
1998	John O'Mahony	Galway	1-14 : 1-10	Kildare	Mick O'Dwyer	
1999	Seán Boylan (4)	Meath	1-11 : 1-08	Cork	Larry Tompkins	
2000	Páidí Ó Sé (2)	Kerry	0-17 : 1-10	Galway	John O'Mahony	
2001	John O'Mahony (2)	Galway	0-17 : 0-08	Meath	Seán Boylan	
2002	Joe Kernan	Armagh	1-12 : 0-14	Kerry	Páidí Ó Sé	
2003	Mickey Harte	Tyrone	0-12 : 0-09	Armagh	Joe Kernan	
2004	Jack O'Connor	Kerry	1-20 : 2-09	Mayo	John Maughan	
2005	Mickey Harte (2)	Tyrone	1-16 : 2-10	Kerry	Jack O'Connor	
2006	Jack O'Connor (2)	Kerry	4-15 : 3-05	Mayo	Mickey Moran	
2007	Pat O'Shea	Kerry	3-13 : 1-09	Cork	Billy Morgan	
2008	Mickey Harte (3)	Tyrone	1-15 : 0-14	Kerry	Pat O'Shea	
2009	Jack O'Connor (3)	Kerry	0-16 : 1-09	Cork	Conor Counihan	
2010	Conor Counihan	Cork	0-16 : 0-15	Down	James McCartan Jnr	
2011	Pat Gilroy	Dublin	1-12 : 1-11	Kerry	Jack O'Connor	
2012	Jim McGuinness	Donegal	2-11 : 0-13	Mayo	James Horan	
2013	Jim Gavin	Dublin	2-12 : 1-14	Mayo	James Horan	
2014	Éamonn Fitzmaurice	Kerry	2-09 : 0-12	Donegal	Jim McGuinness	
2015	Jim Gavin (2)	Dublin	0-12 : 0-9	Kerry	Éamonn Fitzmaurice	
2016	Jim Gavin (3)	Dublin	1-15 : 1-14	Mayo	Stephen Rochford	
2017	Jim Gavin (4)	Dublin	1-17 : 1-16	Mayo	Stephen Rochford	
2018	Jim Gavin (5)	Dublin	2-17 : 1-14	Tyrone	Mickey Harte	
2019	Jim Gavin (6)	Dublin	1-18 : 0-15	Kerry	Peter Keane	
2020	Dessie Farrell	Dublin	2-14 : 0-15	Mayo	James Horan	
2021	Feargal Logan & Brian Dooher	Tyrone	2-14 : 0-15	Mayo	James Horan	
2022	Jack O'Connor (4)	Kerry	0-20 : 0-16	Galway	Pádraic Joyce	
2023	Dessie Farrell (2)	Dublin	1-15 : 1-13	Kerry	Jack O'Connor	
2024	Kieran McGeeney	Armagh	1-11 : 0-13	Galway	Pádraic Joyce	
2025	Jack O'Connor (5)	Kerry	1-26 : 0-19	Donegal	Jim McGuinness	
2026	Andy Moran	Mayo	1-20 : 1-17	Kerry	Jack O'Connor	

== See also ==
- List of All-Ireland Senior Hurling Championship winning managers
