= 1974 All-Ireland Under-21 Hurling Championship final =

1974 All-Ireland Under-21 Hurling Championship Final
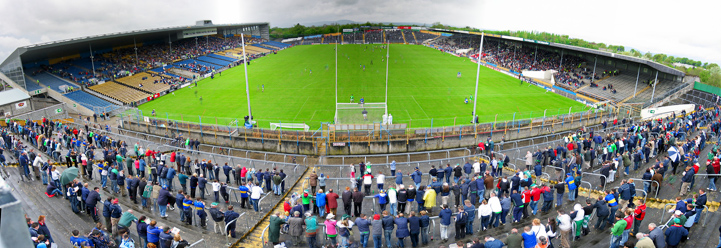
- Event: 1974 All-Ireland Under-21 Hurling Championship
Kilkenny	Waterford
3-8	3-7
- Date: 8 September 1974
- Venue: Semple Stadium, Thurles
- Referee: Seán O'Grady (Limerick)
- Attendance: 9,000
- Weather: High winds and heavy showers

The 1974 All-Ireland Under-21 Hurling Championship final was a hurling match that was played to determine the winners of the 1974 All-Ireland Under-21 Hurling Championship, the 11th season of the All-Ireland Under-21 Hurling Championship, a tournament organised by the Gaelic Athletic Association for the champion teams of the four provinces of Ireland. The final was contested by Kilkenny of Leinster and Waterford of Munster, with Kilkenny winning by 3-8 to 3-7.

The All-Ireland final between Kilkenny and Waterford was the first championship meeting between the two teams. Both sides were hoping to win the All-Ireland title for the first time.

Kilkenny were the early pace-setters against the wind, bit Waterford settled to take a 0-4 to 0-2 lead at the quarter mark. Almost from the puck-out after Waterford's fourth point, the Waterford goalkeeper Willie Ryan made a good save from a palmed effort by Billy Fitzpatrick, however, Fitzpatrick was back within seconds and scored the first goal of the game. Waterford levelled just before the interval and the score stood at 1-2 to 0-5.

Waterford had no difficulty in facing the wind after the resumption, with Liam Casey scoring their first goal within 90 seconds. Tommy Casey had a point in the 37th minute before scoring a goal a minute later. Kilkenny had two points to which Waterford replied before Kilkenny substitute Bobby Sweeney scored his side's second goal of the game. Brendan Mansfield scored Waterford's third goal to give his side a six-point lead with eight minutes left, however, Kilkenny rallied. A goal from Ger Woodcock was followed by points from Ger Fennelly and Fitzpatrick before the former levelled the scores at 3-7. Casey had the chance to give Waterford the lead again, however, his shot went wide. Kilkenny swept downfield again with Fitzpatrick clinching the winning score.

Kilkenny's All-Ireland victory was their first. They became the fifth team since its inception to win the championship.

== Match ==
=== Details ===
8 September 1974

Kilkenny	3-8 – 3-7	Waterford
B. Fitzpatrick 1-2, B. Sweeney 1-1, G. Woodcock 1-0, G. Fennelly 0-3, P. Mulcahy 0-1, N. Brennan 0-1.		T. Casey 1-2, L. Power 1-1, B. Mansfield 1-1, J. Galvin 0-1, E. Ryan 0-1, P. McGrath 0-1.

Semple Stadium, Thurles
Referee: S. O'Grady (Limerick)

Kilkenny	Waterford
