= Bill Cody (hurler) =

Irish hurling selector and Gaelic games administrator

- Born: William Cody; 24 July 1915; Thomastown, County Kilkenny, Ireland
- Died: 21 October 2001 (aged 86); Kilkenny, Ireland
- Occupation: Insurance salesman
- Employer: Royal Liver Assurance
- Known for: James Stephens club chairman
- Spouse: Annie Hoyne
- Children: Brian Cody (son)
- Parent(s): Edward Cody; Anastatia Barron

William Cody (24 July 1915 – 21 October 2001) was an Irish hurling selector and Gaelic games administrator.

In the early 1960s Cody became involved with the James Stephens club and helped to establish a youth section at the club with Georgie Leahy. The club won several under-16 championships in both hurling and Gaelic football, four county minor championships from six successive final appearances as well as two county under-21 championships.

Cody was elected vice-chairman of the club in 1967 before taking over as chairman in 1969. During his sixteen-year term of office, the club won two All-Ireland titles. Under Cody's chairmanship the club also purchased its main club grounds at Larchfield.

At inter-county level Cody served as a selector in several grades. A three-year stint as a selector with the Kilkenny minor team ended without success, however, as a senior selector in 1971 he helped guide the team to the Leinster title.

Cody was married to Annie Hoyne and had nine children. His son, Brian Cody, is an All-Ireland-winning captain and manager with Kilkenny.
