= Eugene McKenna =

Irish Gaelic footballer and manager

Personal information
- Born: July 1956 (age 70) County Tyrone, Northern Ireland

Sport
- Sport: Gaelic football
- Position: Full Forward
Club
- Years: Club
- Augher St Macartan's
Inter-county
- Years: County
- ?-1989: Tyrone
Inter-county titles
- Ulster titles: 3
- All-Irelands: 0
- All Stars: 3

Eugene McKenna is a former Gaelic football manager and player for Augher St Macartan's and for the Tyrone county team. With three All Stars, three Ulster Senior Football Championship medals as a player, two as a manager to his name, and, in 2002, he guided Tyrone to their first all-Ireland triumph in the National League. He later managed his county.

His son Niall won the All-Ireland Minor Football Championship with Tyrone in 2008 having played the season in midfield. His second son, Peter, represented the Tyrone Minors in 2012, playing wing half back and both sons currently represent Donaghmore St Patrick's GFC at senior level.

== Playing career ==
McKenna was the captain of a noteworthy Tyrone team in the mid-eighties, which included All Star winners, Plunkett Donaghy, Frank McGuigan, Damian O'Hagan and John Lynch.

Eugene started his playing career with Augher St Macartan's, a small club in the south of Tyrone. He achieved great success with Augher, such as winning the Tyrone County Championship and captaining them twice on this occasion.

In 1986, he led Tyrone to their first ever All-Ireland Final, against the much-fancied Kerry, who were going for their third title in a row. Tyrone gained a massive seven-point lead during the second half, but a missed penalty dented their confidence, and McKenna had to be replaced due to injury. Tyrone then suffered a heavy defeat to the experienced Kerrymen, with the score ending 2-15 to 1-10 (21 points to 13).

He won the Ulster Championship again in 1989, although this time he was under the skippership of Plunkett Donaghy. Tyrone defeated Donegal in a replayed final.

McKenna won three All-Star awards during his career, in 1984, 1986 and 1989, making him Tyrone's most prolific representative, until the emergence of Peter Canavan in the mid nineties.

== Management career ==
After he retired from playing football, McKenna joined his longtime manager, Art McRory, guiding the team to its second sustained spell of success. This began in 1994, with Tyrone reaching the Ulster Final, although they lost to Down. Down went on to win the All-Ireland Final, to continue a streak of four Ulster teams winning the accolade in a row.

In 1995, Tyrone won the Ulster Championship, including winning a heated encounter against Derry, where they came back from five points down, despite having two players sent off. In the Ulster Final, against Cavan, McKenna's substitutes both scored goals, and Tyrone comfortably won the match by nine points. When Adrian Cush scored the second goal with less than two minutes remaining, the jubilant Tyrone fans (who were already lining the pitch) initiated a premature pitch invasion. However, they quickly broke, avoiding the possibility of the match being abandoned.

In the next game, the All-Ireland Semi-Final, Tyrone beat Galway, with an emerging Peter Canavan leading the team with a personal tally of 1-07. It had only been the second time Tyrone had won the Semi-Final, the first being in 1986, when McKenna was captain.

In the All-Ireland Final against Dublin, Tyrone took an early lead, just as they had in 1986, but the Dubs fought back, and ended up winning the match by a single point, 1-10 to 0-12. Peter Canavan had scored eleven points that day, but still ended up on the losing side. Tyrone fans remember the final with bitter taste, due to a controversial decision by referee Paddy Russell. With seconds remaining, and Tyrone down by a point, Russell adjudged Canavan to have touched the ball in the ground, when he was passing it to teammate Sean McLaughlin. McLaughlin put the ball over the bar, but the point was not counted.

In 1996, Tyrone again won the Ulster Championship, beating Down in the Final. The match is probably best remembered for the two great saves by Tyrone goalkeeper Finbar McConnell. In the semi-final, Tyrone lost to Meath. Tyrone fans remember this match because of the perceived "dirty" tactics by Meath. Several of Tyrone's key players sustained injuries in that match, including Peter Canavan, who subsequently found out he had been playing with a broken foot. Brian Dooher and Cairan McBride both had their heads heavily bandaged during the match. McKenna and McRory's hands were tied, because they had used up their tally of three substitutions.

After defeat in the semi-final, McKenna and McRory stepped down, only to return again in 2000. They won another Ulster Championship in 2001, and led Tyrone to National League success for the first time in their history (and the first All-Ireland Senior title Tyrone had ever won), but they were replaced in 2002 after a disappointing loss in the Championship to an unfancied Sligo. There is speculation that the departure was acrimonious, and the Tyrone Board offered a public apology to McKenna. The vacancy, however, paved the way for Mickey Harte who has surpassed McKenna's achievements as manager since taking over, by winning the All-Ireland.

Since leaving the Tyrone manager's spot he has become heavenly involved in his local GAA club (Donaghmore St Patricks). He has guided the youth teams in Donahghmore to great success. In 2008 Eugene became manager of the Donaghmore senior team after the departure of Joe Faloon

Sporting positions
| Preceded by Art McRory | Tyrone Senior Football Manager ?-1996 | Succeeded by Danny Ball |
| Preceded by Danny Ball | Tyrone Senior Football Manager; 2001-2002 | Succeeded by Mickey Harte |
