= Canice Brennan =

Kilkenny hurler

Personal information
- Native name: Cainneach Ó Braonáin (Irish)
- Born: 20 April 1972 (age 54) County Kilkenny
- Height: 5 ft 11 in (180 cm)

Sport
- Sport: Hurling
- Position: Defence, midfield
Club
- Years: Club
- Conahy Shamrocks
Club titles
- Kilkenny titles: 0
- Leinster titles: 0
- All-Ireland Titles: 0
Inter-county
- Years: County
- 1992–2000: Kilkenny
Inter-county titles
- Leinster titles: 3
- All-Irelands: 1
- All Stars: 0

Canice Brennan (born 20 April 1972) is a former hurler who played with Conahy Shamrocks and the Kilkenny county team. He was part of the Kilkenny team that won the All-Ireland SHC in 2000, having played in previous finals in 1998 and 1999, and achieved success at minor and under-21 level.

He is a young brother of former hurler Kieran Brennan and former hurler and manager Nickey Brennan, who was also president of the GAA.
