= Castlederg St Eugene's GAC =

Tyrone-based Gaelic games club

- Caisleán na Deirge Naoimh Eoghain CLG
- Founded: 1975
- County: Tyrone
- Nickname: The Tigers
- Colours: Red, Black and Amber
- Grounds: Marius McHugh Memorial Park
- Coordinates: 54°42′26″N 7°35′57″W

Playing kits
Standard

Castlederg St Eugene's (Irish: Caisleán na Deirge Naoimh Eoghain) is a Gaelic Athletic Association club. The club is based in Castlederg in County Tyrone, Northern Ireland.

The club concentrates on Gaelic football, while Mná Na Deirge provides for ladies Gaelic football.

== History ==
The club was formed in 1975 under the name Naomh Eoghan Caisleán na Deirge C.L.G. For the most part of the club's existence, they have played their adult football at Junior level. However they were promoted to Intermediate football in 1980 and remained at that level until 1983. They were again successful at gaining promotion in 1989 and stayed in the Intermediate grade until 1993. In 2001, they won their first adult title when their Reserve team won the Junior Reserve Championship, beating Newtownstewart at Drumquin.

The senior team competed in Division 3 of the Tyrone All-County Football League and in the Tyrone Junior Football Championship up until 2016. That year, under the management of Dermot Corry, the club lifted their first ever title at adult level when they lifted the Division 3 All County League. They gained promotion to Division 2 by finishing top of the League, a single point above Tattyreagh, after a victory over Glenelly (1-14 to 1–8) on the final day of the season. The club found life in Division 2 difficult, finishing second from bottom with only 8 League points after only 3 league wins and 2 draws.

In 2018, the club returned to junior football.

== Achievements ==
- Tyrone All-County League Division 3 (1): 2016

== Notable players ==
- John Lynch - Tyrone Senior Footballer (1980 - 1992) and 1986 All Star.
