= Liam O'Neill =

Gaelic sports administrator (1955–2026

Liam O'Neill (August 1955 – 4 August 2026) was an Irish Gaelic games administrator, who served as the 37th president of the Gaelic Athletic Association. He was from County Laois.

== Career ==
A former chairman of the Leinster Council, O'Neill initially sought the GAA presidency at the 2008 Congress, but Christy Cooney defeated him.

In June 2010, O'Neill became the first person to declare his candidacy to succeed Cooney. He became president-elect at the annual GAA Congress in April 2011 following the withdrawal of three other candidates, and succeeded Cooney in the post on 14 April 2012 at the Congress held at Killenard in Laois - becoming the 37th president of the GAA.

A primary school principal, O'Neill set out in his inaugural address a manifesto centred on sports issues (refereeing, discipline, fixtures planning and the promotion of hurling), organisation (finance, infrastructure and the development of officers) and growth (youth involvement, recruiting new members, forming new clubs and the challenge of urbanisation).

Following the 2012 All-Ireland Senior Football Championship Final, O'Neill related that All-Ireland winning captain Michael Murphy, as they exchanged the Sam Maguire Cup, had offered his condolences on the sudden death of O'Neill's sister the previous day. President O'Neill went on to express his admiration for Murphy and called him an "exceptional young captain".

== Post-presidency ==
After departing as president, O'Neill acted as a spokesperson for the GAA, such as in the aftermath of the Armagh eye-gouging incident in 2022.

O'Neill died on 4 August 2026, at the age of 70.

Sporting positions
Preceded by Christy Cooney	President of the Gaelic Athletic Association; 2012–2015	Succeeded by Aogán Ó Fearghail
