= Georgie Leahy =

Irish hurling player, coach and manager

Seán "Georgie" Leahy
Personal information
- Native name: Seán Ó Laocha (Irish)
- Nickname: Georgie
- Born: 1938 Kilkenny, Ireland
- Died: 6 June 2017 (aged 78) Kilkenny, Ireland
- Occupations: P&T employee

Sport
- Sport: Hurling
- Position: Full forward
Club
- Years: Club
- James Stephens
Club titles
- Kilkenny titles: 1
Inter-county*
Years	County	Apps (scores)
1970-1971	Kilkenny	0 (0-00)
Inter-county titles
- Leinster titles: 1
- All-Irelands: 0
- NHL: 0
- All Stars: 0
- *Inter County team apps and scores correct as of 17:26, 6 June 2017.

Seán "Georgie" Leahy (1938 – 6 June 2017) was an Irish hurling manager, coach, selector and player. His league and championship career with the Kilkenny senior team lasted just one season from 1970 until 1971.

Leahy first played competitive hurling with the James Stephens club in his teens, winning a county junior championship medal in 1955. He progressed onto the senior team and was in the twilight of his club career when he won a county senior championship medal in 1969.

Success at club level saw Leahy come to the attention of the inter-county selectors. He made his debut on the inter-county scene at the age of seventeen when he first linked up with the Kilkenny minor team. An All-Ireland runner-up in this grade, he later joined the senior team during the 1970-71 league. Leahy was an All-Ireland runner-up later that year, however, he won a Leinster medal as a non-playing substitute.

After beginning his coaching career as a sixteen year old, Leahy became more involved in team management and coaching in his retirement from playing. At club level he enjoyed =championship and league successes with Galmoy, Tullaroan, Barrow Rangers, Mooncoin, Conahy Shamrocks and Castletown. In 1976 Leahy was the sole trainer, coach and selector when he guided James Stephens to the All-Ireland title. He repeated the feat with Glenmore in 1991, becoming the first person to manage two different clubs to All-Ireland titles.

At inter-county level Leahy enjoyed much success as a coach and a selector at all grades with Kilkenny between 1972 and 1978. With the senior team he was a selector with the All-Ireland-winning teams in 1972, 1974 and 1975. As an under-21 selector he won back-to-back All-Ireland titles in 1974 and 1974, having earlier coached the minor team to the All-Ireland title in 1972. During that same period Leahy was a selector on four Railway Cup-winning Leinster teams.

Leahy later worked as a manager, coach, trainer and selector with numerous inter-county teams, including Waterford, Wexford, Laois, Carlow, Armagh, Antrim, Offaly, Westmeath and Meath.

== Career statistics ==
Team	Year	National League			Leinster		All-Ireland		Total	
Team	Year	Division	Apps	Score	Apps	Score	Apps	Score	Apps	Score
Kilkenny	1970-71	Division 1A	2	0-01	0	0-00	0	0-00	2	0-01
Total			2	0-01	0	0-00	0	0-00	2	0-01

== Honours ==
=== As a player ===
James Stephens

- Kilkenny Senior Hurling Championship (1): 1969
- Kilkenny Junior Hurling Championship (1): 1955

Kilkenny

- Leinster Senior Hurling Championship (1): 1971
- Leinster Minor Hurling Championship (1): 1955

=== In management ===
James Stephens

- All-Ireland Senior Club Hurling Championship (1): 1976
- Leinster Senior Club Hurling Championship (1): 1975
- Kilkenny Senior Hurling Championship (2): 1975, 1976

Glenmore

- All-Ireland Senior Club Hurling Championship (1): 1991
- Leinster Senior Club Hurling Championship (1): 1990
- Kilkenny Senior Hurling Championship (1): 1990

Kilkenny

- All-Ireland Senior Hurling Championship (3): 1972, 1974, 1975
- Leinster Senior Hurling Championship (5): 1972, 1973, 1974, 1975, 1978
- All-Ireland Under-21 Hurling Championship (2): 1974, 1975
- Leinster Under-21 Hurling Championship (2): 1974, 1975
- All-Ireland Minor Hurling Championship (1): 1972
- Leinster Minor Hurling Championship (1): 1972

Offaly

- Leinster Senior Hurling Championship (1): 1988

Leinster

- Railway Cup (4): 1973, 1974, 1975, 1977
