= Kieran Brennan =

Kilkenny hurler

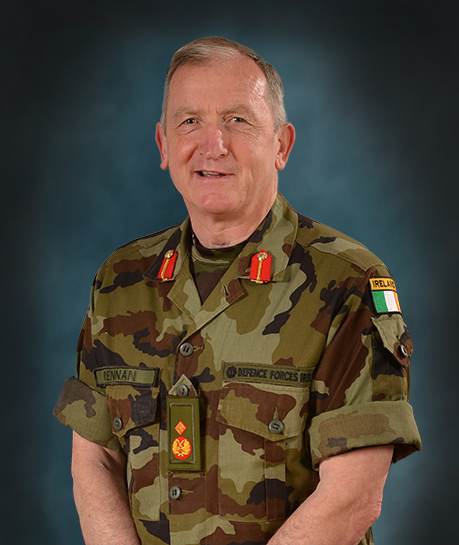
- Born: 20 June 1957 (age 69); Jenkinstown, County Kilkenny, Ireland
- Military career
- Allegiance: Ireland
- Branch: Army
- Service years: 1975–2019
- Rank: Major general
- Commands: 2015 Deputy Chief of Staff Ops; 2010 Military Advisor to OSCE; 2008 Commander 98th Inf Bn EUFOR Chad/CAR; 2004 Commander 28th Inf Gp KFOR
- Conflicts: UNIFIL (Lebanon); KFOR (Kosovo); EUFOR Chad/CAR (Chad)
- Awards: Service Medal; UN Peacekeepers Medal; Centenary Medal; UN Medal for UNIFIL; NATO Medal for KFOR; CSDP Medal for EUFOR Chad/CAR

Kieran Brennan
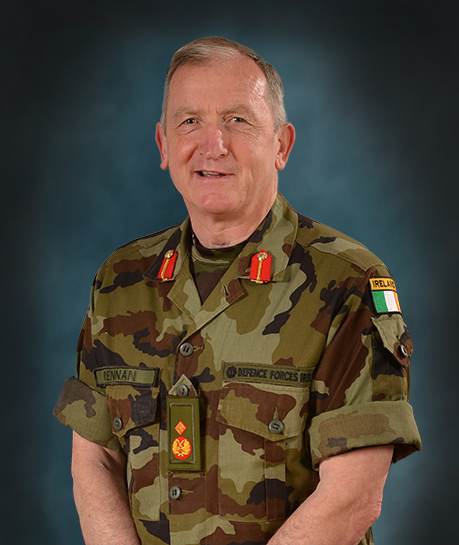

Personal information
- Native name: Ciarán Ó Braonáin (Irish)
- Height: 5 ft 8 in (173 cm)

Sport
- Sport: Hurling
- Position: Centre-forward
Club
- Years: Club
- Conahy Shamrocks
Club titles
- Kilkenny titles: 0
Inter-county*
Years	County	Apps (scores)
1978–1987	Kilkenny	22 (3–50)
Inter-county titles
- Leinster titles: 5
- All-Irelands: 2
- NHL: 2
- All Stars: 1
- *Inter County team apps and scores correct as of 13:17, 17 June 2015.

Kieran Brennan (born 20 June 1957) is an Irish Army major general and former hurler who played as a centre-forward at senior level for the Kilkenny county team. He served as Deputy Chief of Staff for Operations with the Irish Defence Forces until mid-2019.

Born in Jenkinstown, County Kilkenny, Brennan first played competitive hurling during his schooling at St Kieran's College. He arrived on the inter-county scene at the age of sixteen, when he first linked up with the Kilkenny minor team, before later joining the under-21 side. He made his senior debut during the 1978 championship. Brennan subsequently became a regular member of the starting fifteen and won two All-Ireland Senior Hurling Championship (SHC) medals, five Leinster Senior Hurling Championship (SHC) medals and two National Hurling League medals. He was an All-Ireland SHC runner-up on one occasion.

At club level Brennan won several intermediate and junior championship medals with Conahy Shamrocks.

His brothers, Nickey and Canice, also experienced All-Ireland SHC success with Kilkenny.

Throughout his career Brennan made 22 championship appearances. His retirement came following the conclusion of the 1987 championship.

In retirement from playing Brennan became involved in team management and coaching with club side Conahy Shamrocks.

== Playing career ==
=== Colleges ===
During his schooling at St Kieran's College in Kilkenny, Brennan established himself as a key member of the senior hurling team. In 1974, he won a Leinster medal following a 5–11 to 2–3 defeat of St Peter's College. On 28 April 1974, St Kieran's faced St Finbarr's College in the All-Ireland decider. A narrow 2–11 to 1–12 score line resulted in defeat for Brennan's side.

In 1975 Brennan was appointed captain of the St Kieran's senior team. He won a second successive Leinster medal that year as St Kieran's defeated Presentation College from Birr by 6–12 to 4–3. On 20 April 1975 St Kieran's faced Colaiste Iognaid Ris from Cork in the All-Ireland decider. A huge 6–9 to 2–3 victory gave Brennan, who scored 2–3, an All-Ireland medal.

=== Club ===
Brennan, along with his brother, Nickey, played club hurling and football with his local club Conahy Shamrocks. He was a key part of the team that won the junior county title in 1976 and county intermediate titles in 1977 and 1986.

=== Minor and under-21 ===
Brennan first played for Kilkenny as a member of the minor team in 1974. An 8–19 to 3–5 trouncing of Dublin secured a fourth successive provincial title for the team and a first Leinster MHC medal for Brennan. The subsequent All-Ireland Minor Hurling Championship (MHC) decider on 1 September 1974 saw Cork providing the opposition. In a low-scoring game Brennan's side were defeated by 1–10 to 1–8.

The Kilkenny minors retained their provincial dominance in 1975 with Brennan collecting a second successive Leinster medal following a 2–18 to 3–4 defeat of Dublin once again. On 6 September 1975 Kilkenny faced Cork in the All-Ireland decider for the second year in succession. The Cats proved much too strong and powered to a 3–19 to 1–14 victory, giving Brennan an All-Ireland MHC medal.

By 1976, Brennan had joined the Kilkenny under-21 team. He won his first Leinster medal that year as Kilkenny accounted for Wexford by 3–21 to 0–5. The subsequent All-Ireland U21HC final was a replay of the previous year with Cork providing the opposition once again. The Rebels made no mistake on this occasion and secured a 2–17 to 1–8 victory.

Hennessy won a second successive Leinster medal in 1977 as Wexford were downed once again on a score line of 3–11 to 1–10. Cork were once again waiting for Kilkenny in the All-Ireland decider. Having been beaten the previous year, the Cats made no mistake on this occasion and secured a narrow 2–9 to 1–9 victory giving Brennan an All-Ireland Under-21 Hurling Championship medal.

=== Senior ===
Brennan made his senior championship debut on 16 July 1978 in a 2–16 to 1–5 provincial final defeat of Wexford. It was his first Leinster Senior Hurling Championship (SHC) medal. Brennan was later dropped from the starting fifteen for the subsequent All-Ireland SFC final against Cork on 3 September 1978. He remained on the bench for the entire game as Cork secured a 1–15 to 2–8 victory.

After being dropped from the team in 1979, Brennan was later restored to the starting fifteen. After a fallow two-year period, Kilkenny bounced back in 1982 with Brennan winning his first National Hurling League medal following a 2–14 to 1–11 defeat of Wexford. He later added a second Leinster medal to his collection following a 1–11 to 0–12 defeat of three-in-a-row hopefuls and reigning All-Ireland champions Offaly. On 5 September 1982, Kilkenny and Cork renewed their rivalry in the All-Ireland SHC decider. The Cats were rank outsiders on the day; however, a brilliant save by Noel Skehan was followed by two quick goals by Christy Heffernan just before the interval. Éamonn O'Donoghue pegged a goal back for Cork; however, Ger Fennelly added a third for Kilkenny who secured a 3–18 to 1–13 victory. It was a first All-Ireland medal for Brennan.

Brennan won a third Leinster SHC medal in 1983 as Offaly were accounted for by 1–17 to 0–13. The All-Ireland SHC final on 4 September 1983 was a replay of the previous year, with Cork hoping to avenge that defeat. Billy Fitzpatrick was the star with ten points, giving Kilkenny a 2–14 to 1–9 lead with seventeen minutes left; however, they failed to score for the remainder of the game. A stunning comeback by Cork just fell short and Brennan collected a second All-Ireland SHC medal following a 2–14 to 2–12 victory.

Three-in-a-row proved beyond Kilkenny in 1984; however, Brennan's performance earned him an All-Star.

In 1986, the team bounced back, with Brennan collecting a second league medal following a 2–10 to 2–6 defeat of Galway. He later collected a fourth Leinster SHC medal following a 4–10 to 1–11 defeat of reigning champions Offaly.

Brennan won a fifth and final Leinster SHC medal in 1987, as Offaly were downed once again by 2–14 to 0–17. On 6 September 1987, Galway, a team hoping to avoid becoming the first to lose three consecutive All-Ireland SHC finals in-a-row, faced a Kilkenny team in the 1987 All-Ireland Senior Football Championship final, with many Galway players knowing it would be their last chance to claim an All-Ireland SHC medal. Galway 'keeper John Commins saved two goal chances from Ger Fennelly, while, at the other end, substitute Noel Lane bagged a decisive goal, as Galway claimed a 1–12 to 0–9 victory.

== Military career ==
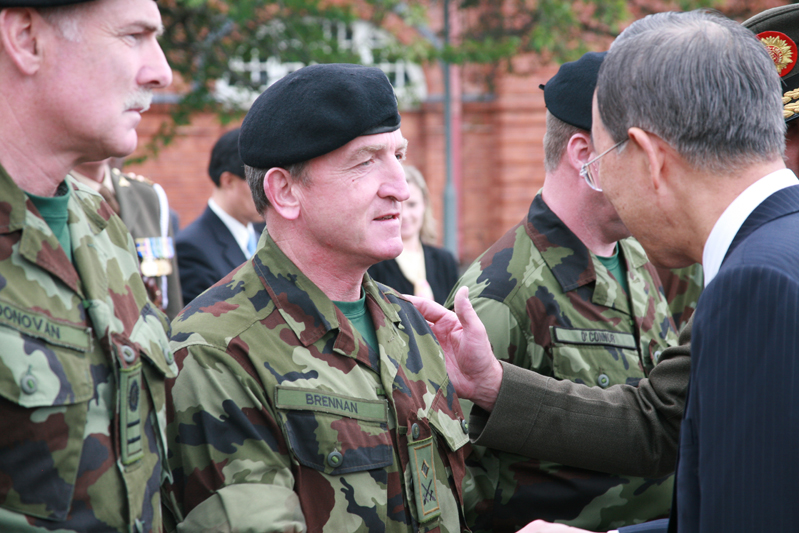
Maj Gen Brennan meeting UN Secretary-General Ban Ki-moon

After completing his secondary education at St Kieran's College, Brennan joined the Irish Army and was commissioned as an officer in the Infantry Corps in 1977. He has since instructed in the Military College, Defence Forces Training Centre, and served as battalion commander of the Third Infantry Battalion in Stephens Barracks, Kilkenny, while he also has extensive overseas experience having served twice with the United Nations Interim Force in Lebanon (UNIFIL) in 1982 and 1997.

Brennan served as company commander with the 28th Infantry Group as part of a Kosovo Force (KFOR) Multinational Battalion in Kosovo in 2004 led by the North Atlantic Treaty Organization (NATO). Four years later in 2008, he commanded the 98th Infantry Battalion with the European Union Force Chad/CAR (EUFOR) mission in Chad, and, in 2010, he served as Deputy Military Advisor at the Permanent Mission to the Organisation for Security and Co-operation in Europe (OSCE) in Vienna, Austria.

In June 2015, it was announced that Brennan would take over as Deputy Chief of Staff Operations (D COS Ops) at Defence Forces Headquarters (DFHQ). His retirement was announced in mid 2019.

== Education ==
Brennan is a graduate of the Irish Defence Forces Military College, where he completed both the Junior and Senior Command and Staff Courses.

He studied economics, finance and accountancy at NUI Galway, graduating with a Bachelor of Commerce (BComm) degree.

== Personal life ==
Kieran Brennan was born in Suttonsrath, Jenkinstown, County Kilkenny in 1957. The son of Kieran Brennan (1926–1985) and Margaret "Peggy" Dalton (1931–2009), he has four brothers – Nickey, Gearóid, Canice and Paudie – and four sisters – Kathleen, Bernadette, Bridget and Marion. He is married and has three children, a daughter and two sons – both sons serve in the Defence Forces.

== Hurling honours ==
St Kieran's College

- All-Ireland Colleges Senior Hurling Championship (1): 1975
- Leinster Colleges Senior Hurling Championship (2): 1974, 1975

Conahy Shamrocks

- Kilkenny Intermediate Hurling Championship (2): 1977, 1986
- Kilkenny Junior Hurling Championship (1): 1976

Kilkenny

- All-Ireland Senior Hurling Championship (2): 1982, 1983
- Leinster Senior Hurling Championship (5): 1978, 1982, 1983, 1986, 1987 (c)
- National Hurling League (2): 1981–82, 1985–86
- All-Ireland Under-21 Hurling Championship (1): 1977
- Leinster Under-21 Hurling Championship (2): 1976, 1977
- All-Ireland Minor Hurling Championship (1): 1975
- Leinster Minor Hurling Championship (2): 1974, 1975

== Decorations ==
Service Medal (20 years service)
United Nations Peacekeepers Medal
1916 Centenary Commemorative Medal
United Nations Medal for UNIFIL
NATO Non-Article 5 Medal for KFOR
Common Security and Defence Policy Service Medal for EUFOR Chad/CAR

Preceded by Liam Fennelly	Kilkenny Senior Hurling Captain; 1985	Succeeded by Frank Holohan
