= Christy Cooney =

Gaelic games administrator

Christy Cooney (Irish: Críostóir Ó Cuana, born 1952 in Youghal, County Cork, Ireland) is a Gaelic games administrator, who served as the 36th president of the Gaelic Athletic Association. He was elected president at the annual GAA Congress on 12 April 2008 and succeeded Nickey Brennan in the post in 2009 - becoming the 36th president of the GAA.

In the GAA Annual Congress in 2005, Nickey Brennan was voted as the new GAA president, only 17 votes ahead of Cooney. Brennan's election was seen as a surprise by some and Cooney thought he had gathered enough support among delegates to secure the position. Brennan said that he hoped Cooney would put his name forward again in the future. At the time Cooney was president of his local club Youghal.

Cooney ran again for president three years later and was elected with over half the votes at the 2008 Congress, beating Liam O'Neill and Sean Fogarty. In 2011 O'Neill was nominated unopposed to succeed to the post, and did so as Cooney stepped down in April 2012.

Earlier, in the mid-1990s, Cooney was one of the government-appointed members of the Independent Radio and Television Commission (IRTC), which at the time licensed and regulated Independent broadcasting in Ireland.

== Controversy ==
Cooney was widely criticised for his stance on pitch invasions at Croke Park. Due to an anti-pitch invasion stance held by Cooney and other GAA officials, the GAA installed a large fence encompassing perspex screening in front of the Hill 16 end in an effort to deter pitch invasions. In numerous interviews, Cooney gave the Hillsborough disaster as an example why this fence is needed, yet numerous columnists have pointed out the irony that this fence may actually lead to a Hillsborough type tragedy at Croke Park. A campaign to get Dublin City Council to remove the barrier began.

== FÁS controversy ==
Cooney faced the public accounts committee regarding €643,000 spent on foreign travel by FÁS executives as well as spending irregularities identified in FÁS's €9m annual advertising budget.

Sporting positions
Preceded by Tony O'Mahony	Vice-Chairman of the Cork County Board; 1991–1993	Succeeded by Donal Coleman
Preceded by Tony O'Mahony	Chairman of the Cork County Board; 1994–1996	Succeeded by Brian Barrett
Preceded by Nickey Brennan	President of the Gaelic Athletic Association; 2009–2012	Succeeded by Liam O'Neill
