= John Lynch (Tyrone Gaelic footballer) =

Irish Gaelic footballer

Personal information
- Born: 1962 (age 63–64) County Tyrone, Northern Ireland

Sport
- Sport: Gaelic football
- Position: Back
Club
- Years: Club
- Castlederg St Eugene's
Inter-county
- Years: County
- 1980-c. 1992: Tyrone
Inter-county titles
- Ulster titles: 3
- All Stars: 1

John Lynch (born 1962) is an Irish former Gaelic footballer who played in the Tyrone county team's first All-Ireland SFC final appearance in 1986. He subsequently won an All Star Award.

He also represented Ireland in an early rendition of the International Rules Series. He blames his subsequent sending off for instigating an unfair reputation as being a dirty player.

He played club football for his local town, Castlederg, but was very close to pursuing a career in athletics, until his girlfriend convinced him to pursue Gaelic football.
