= Art McRory =

Irish Gaelic football manager (1940–2023)

Personal information
- Born: 1940 County Tyrone, Northern Ireland
- Died: 9 August 2023 (aged 82–83)

Sport
- Sport: Gaelic football
- Position: ?
Inter-county management
- Years: Team
- ?–2002: Tyrone
Inter-county titles as manager
County	League	Province	All-Ireland
Tyrone	0	5	5

Arthur McRory (c. 1940–9 August 2023) was an Irish Gaelic football manager. From Dungannon, he managed the Tyrone county team on and off for nearly twenty five years. Under him Tyrone enjoyed their first two periods of relative success – the All-Ireland Finals of 1986 and 1995. Although they never won the All-Ireland under his management, McRory is still regarded as one of the great Tyrone managers, with the county having won five Ulster Senior Football Championships under his guidance (1984, 1986, 1995, 1996, 2001).

McRory formed an extremely productive relationship with Eugene McKenna, both when McKenna was a player under McRory and as a manager alongside him.

He left Tyrone management in 2002, after a disappointing exit in the championship qualifiers to Sligo, ostensibly due to health concerns; however, there is also speculation the parting with the Tyrone County board was acrimonious.

McRory had a keen interest in classical music and attended opera.

McRory died on 9 August 2023.

== Sources ==
- Biography from 2001, prior to Ulster Final

Preceded by ?	Tyrone Senior Football Manager; 1980–1987	Succeeded by John Donnelly
Preceded by John Donnelly	Tyrone Senior Football Manager; 1992–1996	Succeeded by Danny Ball
Preceded by Danny Ball	Tyrone Senior Football Manager; 1999–2002	Succeeded by Mickey Harte
