= 1972 All-Ireland Minor Hurling Championship =

All-Ireland Minor Hurling Championship 1972
Championship Details
- Dates: 14 May – 5 September 1972
- Teams: 15

All Ireland Champions
- Winners: Kilkenny (8th win)
- Captain: Brian Cody

All Ireland Runners-up
- Runners-up: Cork

Provincial Champions
- Munster: Cork
- Leinster: Kilkenny
- Ulster: Down
- Connacht: Not Played

Championship Statistics
- Matches Played: 14
- Total Goals: 120 (8.57 per game)
- Total Points: 215 (15.35 per game)
- Top Scorer: Jimmy Barry-Murphy (11-04)

The 1972 All-Ireland Minor Hurling Championship was the 42nd staging of the All-Ireland Minor Hurling Championship since its establishment by the Gaelic Athletic Association in 1928. The championship ran from 14 May to 4 September 1972.

Cork entered the championship as the defending champions.

The All-Ireland final was played at Croke Park in Dublin on 4 September 1972 between Cork and Kilkenny, in what was their sixth All-Ireland final meeting overall and a second meeting in succession. Kilkenny won the match by 8-07 to 3-09 to claim their eighth All-Ireland title overall and a first title in ten years.

Cork's Jimmy Barry-Murphy was the championship's Top scorer with 11-04.

== Leinster Minor Hurling Championship ==
=== Leinster first round ===
14 May 1972 First round	Westmeath	3-10 - 3-09	Kildare	O'Moore Park
	D Carey 1-5, T Cole 1-0, D Costello 1-0, M Kilcoyne 0-2, M Cosgrave 0-2, M Newman 0-1.		J O'Sullivan 2-1, V Moore 1-0, E Lalor 0-2, T Waters 0-2, J Campbell 0-2, T Hogan 0-1, K Earley 0-1.

=== Leinster second round ===
14 May 1972 Second round	Laois	3-07 - 2-05	Offaly	Dr. Cullen Park

2 July 1972 Second round	Westmeath	0-03 - 7-16	Dublin	Cusack Park
	M KIlcoyne 0-1, B Conaty 0-1, D Carey 0-1.		M Holden 1-10, P Browne 3-0, H Gannon 2-0, P McCabe 0-4, M Cranley 1-0, M Martin 0-1, S McCarthy 0-1.

=== Leinster semi-finals ===
25 June 1972 Semi-final	Laois	1-03 - 13-06	Kilkenny	O'Moore Park
	P Keenan 1-0, F Conroy 0-2, M Brophy 0-1.		P Butler 3-2, R Sweeney 3-0, S O'Brien 2-2, J Woodcock 2-1, B Fitzpatrick 2-0, M McCarthy 1-1.

9 July 1972 Semi-final	Wexford	3-15 - 2-11	Dublin	Croke Park
	P Handrick 2-2, N Walsh 1-5, R Kinsella 0-5, T Berry 0-1, D Clancy 0-1, J Murphy 0-1.		P McCabe 1-3, F Reaney 1-2, M Holden 0-4, E Butler 0-1, H Gannon 0-1.

=== Leinster final ===
30 July 1972 Final	Kilkenny	7-10 - 0-04	Wexford	Croke Park
	M McCarthy 3-1, N Minogue 1-0, P Butler 1-0, S O'Brien 1-0, J Mulcahy 1-0, B Cody 0-3, G Fennelly 0-2, M Tierney 0-2, B Fitzpatrick 0-1, R Sweeney 0-1.		J Murphy 0-1, S Murphy 0-1, P Handrick 0-1, B Rowesome 0-1.

== Munster Minor Hurling Championship ==
=== Munster first round ===
20 May 1972 First round	Kerry	3-06 - 5-10	Clare	Austin Stack Park
	D Deady 2-1, G O'Grady 1-0, B Slattery 0-2, M Harrington 0-2, M Laide 0-1.		T O'Mahony 2-2, J Boyce 2-1, S Coghlan 1-4, P McGann 0-1, J Callaghan 0-1, M Sherry 0-1.

24 May 1972 First round	Cork	7-08 - 1-03	Waterford	Cork Athletic Grounds
	J Barry-Murphy 4-0, E O'Sullivan 1-2, R Fitzgerald 1-1, T O'Sullivan 1-0, B Óg Murphy 0-3, K Murphy 0-1, S O'Donovan 0-1.		N Jacob 1-1, S Treacy 0-2.

=== Munster semi-finals ===
2 July 1972 Semi-final	Clare	4-03 - 4-15	Limerick	Cusack Park
	F Coughlan 1-2, P O'Connor 1-0, J Boyce 1--0, S Daly 1-0, T McGann 0-1.		E Tuohy 1-7, T Tobin 2-1, P Tobin 1-2, W Hartnett 0-3, D O'Riordan 0-2.

9 July 1972 Semi-final	Cork	10-05 - 2-03	Tipperary	Gaelic Grounds
	J Barry-Murphy 4-1, B Óg Murphy 2-1, T O'Sullivan 2-0, E O'Sullivan 1-3, T Collins 1-0.		E Darmody 1-0, S Waters 1-0, P McLoughney 0-2, TJ Riordan 0-1.

=== Munster final ===
30 July 1972 Final	Cork	4-11 - 0-03	Limerick	Semple Stadium
	E O'Sullivan 3-3, B Óg Murphy 0-5, J Barry-Murphy 1-1, T Collins 0-2.		E Tuohy 0-2, T Tobin 0-1.

== All-Ireland Minor Hurling Championship ==
=== All-Ireland semi-finals ===
6 August 1972 Semi-final	Kilkenny	7-09 - 2-08	Galway	Croke Park
	M McCarthy 3-0, R Sweeney 2-0, B Fitzpatrick 1-3, P Butler 1-0, G Woodcock 0-3, S O'Sullivan 0-1, B Cody 0-1, M Tierney 0-1.		T Holian 2-0, J Kelly 0-5, M Hanniffy 0-2, J Casey 0-1.	Referee: E Devlin (Tyrone)

6 August 1972 Semi-final	Cork	13-14 - 3-02	Antrim	Cork Athletic Grounds
	T Collins 3-3, T O'Sullivan 3-2, R Fitzgerald 3-1, J Barry-Murphy 1-2, B Murphy 1-1, E O'Sullivan 1-1, J Dunne 1-0, S Farrell 0-2, F Delaney 0-1, K Murphy 0-1.		J O'Neill 1-1, D McFadden 1-0, P McNally 1-0, C Grego 0-1.

=== All-Ireland final ===
4 September 1972 Final	Kilkenny	8-07 - 3-09	Cork	Croke Park
	B Fitzpatrick 3-4, M McCarthy 2-1, J Sullivan 1-0, M Tierney 1-0, P Butler 1-0, G Woodcock 0-1, G Fennelly 0-1.		E O'Sullivan 1-3, T O'Sullivan 1-1, J Barry-Murphy 1-0, F Delaney 0-2, S Farrell 0-1, R Fitzgerald 0-1, B Wilmot 0-1.	Referee: J Moloney (Tipperary)

== Championship statistics ==
=== Top scorers ===
Overall

Rank	Player	Team	Tally	Total	Matches	Average
1	Jimmy Barry-Murphy	Cork	11-04	37	5	7.40
2	Éamonn O'Sullivan	Cork	7-12	33	5	6.60
3	Mick McCarthy	Kilkenny	9-03	30	4	7.50
4	Billy Fitzpatrick	Kilkenny	6-08	26	4	6.50
5	Tadhg O'Sullivan	Cork	7-03	24	5	4.80
6	Pat Butler	Kilkenny	6-02	20	4	5.00
7	Bertie Óg Murphy	Cork	3-10	19	5	3.80
8	Tom Collins	Cork	4-05	17	4	4.25
9	Mick Holden	Dublin	1-14	17	2	8.50
10	Bobby Sweeney	Kilkenny	5-01	16	4	4.00

=== Miscellaneous ===
- Cork became the first team to win seven consecutive Munster Championship titles.
