= Dermot Healy (hurling manager) =

All-Ireland SHC winner with Kilkenny and Offaly

Diarmuid Healy
Personal information
- Born: 1948 (age 77–78)

Sport
- Sport: Hurling
Inter-county management
- Years: Team
- 1979–1986 1988–1990: Offaly; Kilkenny
Inter-county titles as manager
County	League	Province	All-Ireland
Offaly Kilkenny	2; 0	4; 0	4; 0

Diarmuid Healy (born 1948) is an Irish former hurling manager who won All-Ireland titles with St Kieran's College, Kilkenny and Offaly.

He has been interviewed on RTÉ to voice his opinions on the state of hurling in Ireland today.

Achievements
Preceded by Cyril Farrell (Galway)	All-Ireland SHC winning manager 1981	Succeeded by Pat Henderson (Kilkenny)
Preceded by Justin McCarthy; Fr. Michael O'Brien (Cork)	All-Ireland SHC winning manager 1985	Succeeded by Johnny Clifford (Cork)
Sporting positions
Preceded by Andy Gallagher	Offaly Senior Hurling Manager; 1979–1986	Succeeded by Georgie Leahy
Preceded by Eddie Keher	Kilkenny Senior Hurling Manager; 1988–1990	Succeeded by Ollie Walsh
