= 1974 All-Ireland Under-21 Hurling Championship =

All-Ireland Under-21 Hurling Championship 1974
Championship Details
- Dates: 24 April 1974 - 8 September 1974
- Teams: 14

All Ireland Champions
- Winners: Kilkenny (1st win)
- Captain: Ger Fennelly

All Ireland Runners-up
- Runners-up: Waterford
- Captain: Pat McGrath

Provincial Champions
- Munster: Waterford
- Leinster: Kilkenny
- Ulster: Antrim
- Connacht: Not Played

Championship Statistics
- Matches Played: 13
- Top Scorer: Billy Fitzpatrick (4-14); Tom Casey (2-20)

The 1974 All-Ireland Under-21 Hurling Championship was the 11th staging of the All-Ireland Under-21 Hurling Championship since its establishment by the Gaelic Athletic Association in 1964. The championship began on 24 April 1974 and ended on 8 September 1974.

Cork entered the championship as the defending champions, however, they were defeated by Clare in the Munster semi-final.

On 8 September 1974, Kilkenny won the championship following a 3-08 to 3-07 defeat of Waterford in the All-Ireland final at Semple Stadium. This was their first All-Ireland title.

Kilkenny's Billy Fitzpatrick and Waterford's Tom Casey were the championship's joint top scorers.

== Results ==
=== Leinster Under-21 Hurling Championship ===
Quarter-final

7 July 1974 Quarter-final	Dublin	4-14 - 1-05	Offaly	O'Moore Park, Portlaoise
	V Holden 2-5, D Keoghan 2-2, M Reidy 0-4, P Reaney 0-2, P Buckley 0-1.		K Mooney 1-5.	Referee: J Rankins (Laois)

Semi-finals

14 July 1974 Semi-final	Kilkenny	1-11 - 0-03	Laois	Nowlan Park, Kilkenny
	P Mulcahy 1-6, B Fitzpatrick 0-2, T Teehan 0-2, N Brennan 0-1.		T Bowe 0-2, E La Comer 0-1.	Referee: M Bowe (Waterford)

24 July 1974 Semi-final	Wexford	2-10 - 2-06	Dublin	Dr. Cullen Park, Carlow
	PJ Harrison 2-0, R Kinsella 0-6, J Murphy 0-2, N Walsh 0-2.		D Keoghan 1-2, V Holden 1-1, M Reidy 0-1, P Reaney 0-1, H Gannon 0-1.

Final

8 August 1974 Final	Kilkenny	3-08 - 1-05	Wexford	Dr. Cullen Park, Carlow
	B Fitzpatrick 2-7, P Mulcahy 1-1.		J Allen 1-0, R Kinsella 0-2, PJ Harris 0-2, M Walsh 0-1.	Referee: G Kirwan (Offaly)

=== Munster Under-21 Hurling Championship ===
First round

24 April 1974 First round	Limerick	2-07 - 4-12	Waterford	FitzGerald Park, Kilmallock
	P Kelly 0-5, P Tobin 1-0, C Brennan 1-0, C Brouder 0-1, F Connolly 0-1.		M McNamara 2-1, T Casey 0-6, B Mansfield 1-2, P O'Keeffe 1-0, P Egan 0-1, L Power 0-1, E Ryan 0-1.

24 April 1974 First round	Clare	3-12 - 1-08	Tipperary	Cusack Park, Ennis
	P O'Connor 1-3, E O'Connor 1-1, J Treacy 1-1, J Callanan 0-4, J Boyce 0-1, C Honan 0-1, G Loughnane 0-1.		T Fitzpatrick 1-3, G Hayes 0-3, G Williams 0-1, L Heffernan 0-1.

Semi-finals

8 May 1974 Semi-final	Waterford	7-09 - 1-01	Kerry	Fraher Field, Dungarvan
	M McNamara 3-0, B Mansfield 1-4, L Power 1-1, P O'Keeffe 1-0, P McGrath 1-0, E Ryan 0-2, T Casey 0-1, S Treacy 0-1.		J Fitzgerald 1-0, J Hussey 0-1.	Referee: E Carroll (Tipperary)

8 May 1974 Semi-final	Clare	3-16 - 3-04	Cork	Gaelic Grounds, Limerick
	E O'Connor 1-3, J Boyce 1-1, J Treacy 0-4, P O'Connor 0-4, M Gough 1-0, C Honan 0-2, J Callanan 0-1, J Burke 0-1.		J Buckley 2-0, J Barry-Murphy 1-1, S Farrell 0-1, T Fogarty 0-1, F Cunningham 0-1.	Referee: J Moloney (Tipperary)

Final

14 July 1974 Final	Waterford	2-05 - 1-03	Clare	Semple Stadium, Thurles
	P Moore 2-0, T Casey 0-2, P McGrath 0-1, L Power 0-1, B Mansfield 0-1.		J Callinan 1-0, J Treacy 0-1, P O'Connor 0-1, M McNamara 0-1.	Referee: J Moloney (Tipperary)

=== Ulster Under-21 Hurling Championship ===
Final

25 July 1974 Final	Antrim	3-08 - 0-03	Down	Casement Park, Belfast

=== All-Ireland Under-21 Hurling Championship ===
Semi-finals

11 August 1974 Semi-final	Kilkenny	4-12 - 3-06	Galway	Nowlan Park, Kilkenny
	T Teehan 2-2, B Fitzpatrick 1-3, P Mulcahy 1-0, G Fennelly 0-3, S Reid 0-2, S Brophy 0-1, G Woodcock 0-1.		C Curtin 3-1, G Forde 0-2, J Grealish 0-1, D Dooley 0-1, M Kelly 0-1.	Referee: S O'Meara (Tipperary)

18 August 1974 Semi-final	Antrim	1-02 - 3-18	Waterford	Casement Park, Belfast
	P Boyle 1-0, P Growcott 0-1, J McClean 0-1.		T Casey 1-9, P Moore 2-0, M McNamara 0-3, L Power 0-2 B Mansfield 0-2, J Galvin 0-1, E Ryan 0-1.	Referee: C Foley (Dublin)

Final

8 September 1974 Final	Kilkenny	3-08 - 3-07	Waterford	Semple Stadium, Thurles
	B Fitzpatrick 1-2, B Sweeney 1-1, G Woodcock 1-0, G Fennelly 0-3, N Brennan 0-1, T Mulcahy 0-1.		T Casey 1-2, L Power 1-1, B Mansfield 1-1, P McGrath 0-1, E Ryan 0-1, J Galvin 0-1.	Referee: S O'Grady (Limerick)

== Championship statistics ==
=== Top scorers ===
Overall

Rank	Player	County	Tally	Total	Matches	Average
1	Billy Fitzpatrick	Kilkenny	4-14	26	4	6.50
1	Tom Casey	Waterford	2-20	26	5	5.20
2	Mossie McNamara	Waterford	5-04	19	5	3.80
2	Brendan Mansfield	Waterford	3-10	19	5	3.80
3	Pat Mulcahy	Kilkenny	3-07	16	4	4.00
4	Vinny Holden	Dublin	3-06	15	2	7.50
5	Paul Moore	Waterford	4-00	12	5	2.40
5	Liam Power	Waterford	2-06	12	5	2.40

=== Miscellaneous ===
- Waterford won the Munster Championship for the first time in their history.
- The All-Ireland final between Kilkenny and Waterford was their first ever championship meeting.
