= Brian Cody =

Kilkenny hurler and manager

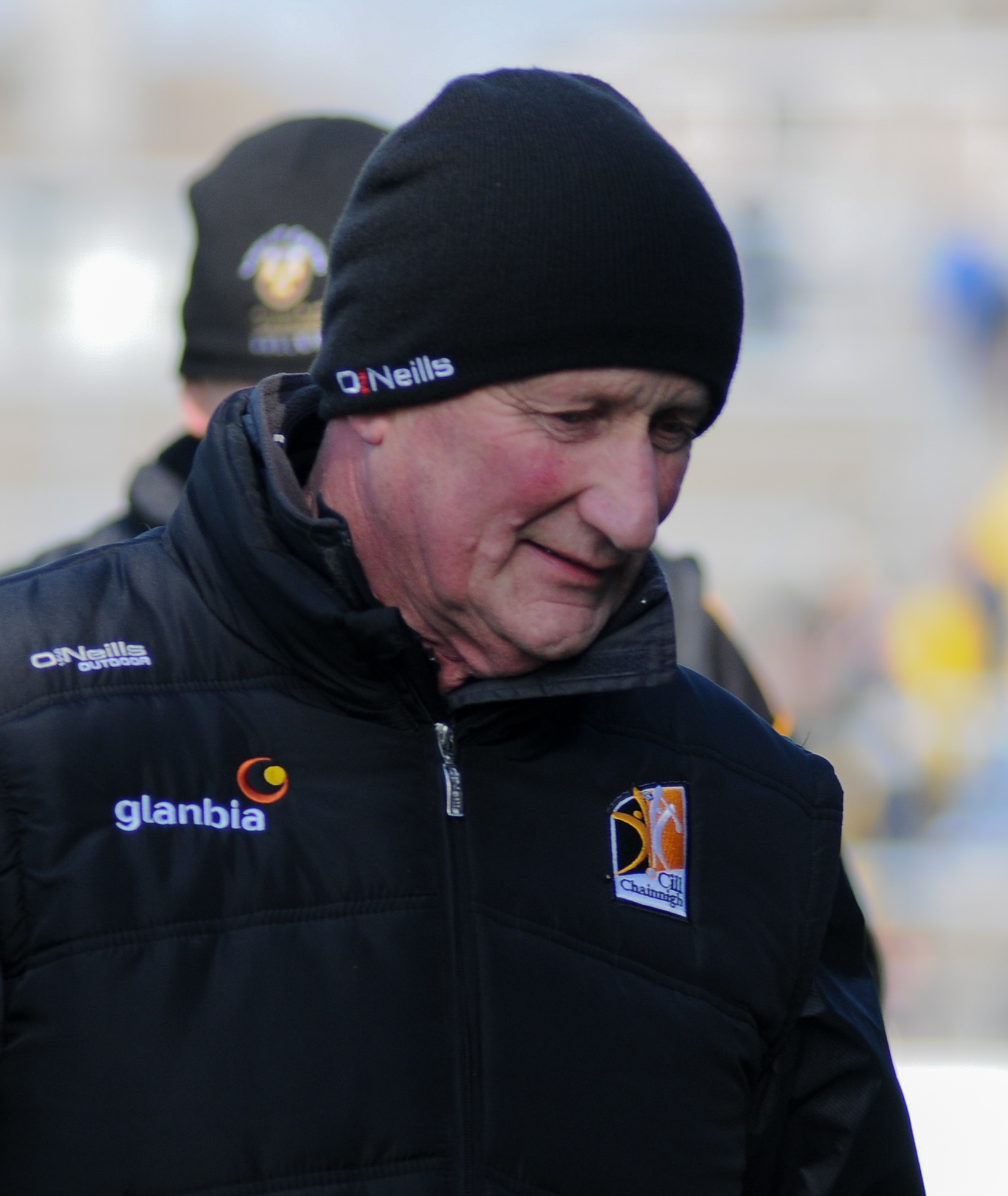
- Cody in 2015

Personal information
- Native name: Briain Mac Óda (Irish)
- Born: 12 July 1954 (age 72) Sheestown, County Kilkenny, Ireland
- Occupation: Retired primary school principal
- Height: 6 ft 0 in (183 cm)

Sport
- Sport: Hurling
- Position: Full-back, Wing-back, Full-Forward
Club
- Years: Club
- James Stephens
Club titles
- Kilkenny titles: 3
- Leinster titles: 2
- All-Ireland Titles: 2
Inter-county*
Years	County	Apps (scores)
1973–1986	Kilkenny	24 (4–9)
Inter-county titles
- Leinster titles: 4
- All-Irelands: 4
- NHL: 2
- All Stars: 2
Inter-county management
- Years: Team
- 1998–2022: Kilkenny
Inter-county titles as manager
County	League	Province	All-Ireland
Kilkenny	10	18	11
- *Inter County team apps and scores correct as of 13:55, 12 January 2013.

Brian Cody (born 12 July 1954) is an Irish former hurling manager and player and retired school principal. He managed the senior Kilkenny county team between 1998 and 2022, becoming the county's longest-serving manager and most successful in terms of major titles won; Cody is widely regarded as the greatest manager in the history of the game.

Cody was appointed manager of the Kilkenny senior team on 16 November 1998 and led Kilkenny through a period of unprecedented provincial and national dominance, winning 43 major honours; these include eleven All-Ireland Senior Hurling Championship titles, including a record-equalling four-in-a-row between 2006 and 2009, seventeen Leinster Senior Hurling Championship titles in twenty three seasons, ten National Hurling League titles (among which were five league-championship doubles) and seven Walsh Cups. He left at the end of the 2022 season.

== Early life ==
Cody was born on 12 July 1954 in Sheestown, County Kilkenny, to William "Bill" Cody (1915-2001) and Annie Hoyne (d.2005). Brian was the fourth of their nine children.

Bill Cody, a native of Thomastown, worked with Royal Liver Assurance and became involved with the James Stephens club in the early 1960s. He was instrumental in forming a juvenile section within the club, while later serving as a selector with the Kilkenny minor and senior teams. Bill Cody was elected vice-chairman of the club in 1967 and chairman in 1969, a position he held until 1986.

Cody was educated at the local national school in Kilkenny, Cody later boarded at St Kieran's College. After completing his Leaving Certificate he attended St Patrick's College in Dublin where he qualified as a primary school teacher.

Cody later worked as a teacher at St Patrick's De La Salle national school in Kilkenny, before serving as principal between 2009 and 2015.

== Playing career ==
=== College ===
During his schooling at St Kieran's College, Cody established himself as a key member of the senior hurling team. In 1971 he won a Leinster medal as captain of the side following a 2–15 to 1–7 defeat of St Peter's College. On 9 May 1971 St Kieran's faced St Finbarr's College in the All-Ireland decider. An 8–6 to 5–8 victory gave Cody an All-Ireland medal.

Cody won a second successive Leinster medal in 1972 following a 7–10 to 3-7 trouncing of Callan CBS. On 30 April 1972 St. Kieran's and St. Finbarr's renewed their rivalry in the All-Ireland decider. A 3–7 to 2–5 score line resulted in defeat for Cody's side.

=== Club ===
After experiencing championship success at underage level, Cody subsequently joined the James Stephens senior team. Defeat at the hands of the Fenians in 1973 was followed by a major breakthrough two years later. A 1–14 to 1–5 defeat of first-time finalists Galmoy gave Cody his first championship medal. James Stephens subsequently qualified for the provincial decider, with Offaly champions St. Rynagh's providing the opposition. James Stephens took the lead from the third minute, with Liam "Chunky" O'Brien being scorer-in-chief. A 1–14 to 2–4 victory gave Cody his first Leinster medal. Two-time champions and hot favourites Blackrock provided the opposition in the subsequent All-Ireland decider. The Rockies got off to the better start, with two goals by Éamonn O'Donoghue and Pat Moylan giving them a 2–1 lead at the quarter mark. James Stephens trailed at the interval but were transformed in the second half. A 2–10 to 2–4 victory gave Cody his first All-Ireland medal.

Cody won a second championship medal in 1976 as Rower-Inistioge were accounted for by 2–14 to 0–13.

After a period of decline, James Stephens bounced back in 1981. A double scores 2–10 to 0–8 defeat of Fenians gave Cody a third championship medal. He later collected a second Leinster medal as championship debutantes Faythe Harriers were narrowly defeated by 0–13 to 1–9. First time finalists Mount Sion of Waterford provided the opposition in the subsequent All-Ireland decider. A hat-trick of goals by John McCormack, together with a ten-point haul from Billy Walton, saw James Stephens fight back from seven points down to record a 3–13 to 3–8 victory. It was a second All-Ireland medal for Cody.

=== Minor and under-21 ===
Cody first played for Kilkenny as a member of the minor team in 1971. He won his first Leinster medal that year following a huge 7–18 to 3-5 trouncing of reigning provincial champions Wexford. On 5 September 1971 Kilkenny faced three-in-a-row hopefuls Cork in the All-Ireland decider. A narrow 2–11 to 1–11 victory for Cork resulted in defeat for Cody's side.

After being appointed captain of the minor team in 1972, Cody won a second Leinster medal following another 7–10 to 0-4 trouncing of Wexford. On 3 September 1972 Kilkenny faced Galway in the subsequent All-Ireland decider. The game was a one-sided affair, and at the full-time whistle Kilkenny were the champions by 8–7 to 3–9. The victory gave Cody an All-Ireland Minor Hurling Championship medal while he also had the honour of lifting the cup.

By 1974 Cody had joined the Kilkenny under-21 team. He won his first Leinster medal that year as Kilkenny accounted for Wexford by 3–8 to 1–5. The subsequent All-Ireland decider against first-time finalists Waterford was a close affair, however, at the final whistle Kilkenny were the champions by 3–8 to 3–7. It was a first All-Ireland medal in that grade for Cody.

Cody added a second Leinster medal to his collection in 1975 as Kilkenny once again defeated Wexford by 3–14 to 0–8. The subsequent All-Ireland final against Cork was rated the best hurling game of the year. Kilkenny ‘keeper Kevin Fennelly brought off two brilliant saves from Con Brassil and Finbarr Delaney in the closing stages to secure a 5–13 to 2–19 victory and a second consecutive All-Ireland medal for Cody.

=== Senior ===
Cody was just out of the minor grade when he was added to the senior panel in 1973. The team lost four key players to injury and emigration prior to the All-Ireland final meeting with Limerick on 2 September 1973. As a result of this Cody was added to the starting fifteen at left wing-back. In spite of Kilkenny fielding a depleted team, the game hung in the balance for the first half, however, eight minutes after the restart Mossie Dowling got a vital goal for Limerick. Shortly after this Richie Bennis spearheaded a rampant Limerick attack which resulted in a 1–21 to 1–14 victory for Limerick.

The All-Ireland final defeat led to a reshuffle of the Kilkenny team and Cody found it hard to retain his place on the starting fifteen the following year. He was still a member of the panel as Kilkenny went on to claim Leinster and All-Ireland titles that year.

Cody was back on the starting fifteen at left corner-back as Kilkenny made it five successive provincial titles in-a-row in 1975. The 2–20 to 2–14 defeat of Wexford gave Cody his first Leinster medal on the field of play. On 7 September 1975 Cody lined out in his second All-Ireland final, with surprise semi-final winners Galway providing the opposition. Playing with the wind in the first half, Galway found themselves ahead by 0–9 to 1–3 at the interval. Eddie Keher's huge tally of 2–7 kept Galway at bay giving Kilkenny a 2–22 to 2–10 victory. It was Cody's first All-Ireland medal on the field of play, while he later won an All-Star.

In 1976 Cody won a National Hurling League medal following a 6–14 to 1–14 trouncing of Clare in a replay. Kilkenny's championship ambitions unravelled in spectacular fashion in the subsequent provincial campaign, when a 2–20 to 1–6 trouncing by Wexford dumped the team out of the championship.

After another unsuccessful season in 1977, Cody was surprisingly moved to the full-forward position the following year. He won a second Leinster medal that year following Kilkenny's 2–16 to 1–16 defeat of reigning provincial champions Wexford. On 3 September 1978 Kilkenny faced reigning champions Cork in the All-Ireland decider. Cork secured a first three-in-a-row of All-Ireland titles for the first time in over twenty years, as a Jimmy Barry-Murphy goal helped the team to a 1–15 to 2–8 victory. At the homecoming for the runners-up the following evening, reports circulated that Cody was booed as he was introduced.

A new Kilkenny team emerged in 1979, however, Cody lost his place on the starting fifteen.

Cody was appointed captain of the team in 1982 as Kilkenny bounced back after a fallow period. He won a second league medal that year following a 2–14 to 1–11 defeat of Wexford. He later won a third Leinster medal following a 1–11 to 0–12 defeat of three-in-a-row hopefuls and reigning All-Ireland champions Offaly. On 5 September 1982 Kilkenny and Cork renewed their rivalry in the All-Ireland decider. The Cats were rank outsiders on the day, however, a brilliant save by Noel Skehan was followed by two quick goals by Christy Heffernan just before the interval. Éamonn O'Donoghue pegged a goal back for Cork, however, Ger Fennelly added a third for Kilkenny who secured a 3–18 to 1–13 victory. It was a second All-Ireland medal for Cody while he also had the honour of lifting the Liam MacCarthy Cup. He was later presented with a second All-Star award.

After missing Kilkenny's league triumph in 1983, Cody was back for the championship. A 1–17 to 0–13 defeat of Offaly gave him a fourth Leinster medal. The All-Ireland final on 4 September 1983 was a replay of the previous year with Cork hoping to avenge that defeat. Billy Fitzpatrick was the star with ten points, giving Kilkenny a 2–14 to 1–9 lead with seventeen minutes left, however, they failed to score for the remainder of the game. A stunning comeback by Cork just fell short and Cody won a third All-Ireland medal following a 2–14 to 2–12 victory.

Kilkenny's fortunes took a downturn following this victory as Offaly dominated the championship. Cody played his last game for Kilkenny in 1985 in a 1–30 to 1-10 Leinster quarter-final defeat by Westmeath.

=== Inter-provincial ===
Cody also lined out with Leinster in the inter-provincial hurling competition. He was a non-playing substitute when Leinster defeated arch-rivals Munster to win the Railway Cup in 1977.

== Managerial career ==
=== Unsuccessful beginning ===
Cody was appointed manager of the Kilkenny senior hurling team on 16 November 1998. He was the only candidate nominated for the position and was initially appointed for a two-year term. In the lead-up to the start of the championship Cody was very contemplative about his team's chances. He believed that 1999 was going to be one of the most open championships in years with any team capable of winning either the Munster or Leinster provincial deciders. In his first full season in charge Cody brought some new players onto the team. James McGarry, at the age of 27, made his senior debut as goalkeeper while a young Henry Shefflin was unearthed and was a new addition in the forward line. With a blend of youth and experience Cody guided his team to the Leinster title following a 5–14 to 1–16 defeat of Offaly. The subsequent All-Ireland decider saw Kilkenny face Cork on 12 September 1999. In a dour contest played on a wet day, Cork trailed by 0–5 to 0–4 after a low-scoring first half. Kilkenny increased the pace after the interval, pulling into a four-point lead. Cork moved up a gear and through Joe Deane, Ben O'Connor and Seánie McGrath, they scored five unanswered points. Kilkenny could only manage one more score – a point from a Henry Shefflin free – and Cork held out to win by 0–13 to 0-12.

=== Early successes ===
In 2000 Cody's side won a second successive Leinster title following another comfortable 2–21 to 1–13 victory over Offaly. As a result of the so-called "back-door" system both sides later faced off against each other again in the All-Ireland final on 10 September 2000. D.J. Carey capitalised on an Offaly mistake after just six minutes to start a goal-fest for 'the Cats'. Carey scored 2–4 in all, sharing his second goal with Henry Shefflin who also scored a goal in the second-half. At the full-time whistle Kilkenny were the champions by 5–15 to 1–14. It was Cody's first All-Ireland title as manager.

Kilkenny's provincial dominance continued in 2001 and a powerful 2–19 to 0–12 defeat of Wexford gave Cody a third successive Leinster title as manager. A shock 2–15 to 1-13 All-Ireland semi-final defeat by Galway ended Kilkenny's interest in the championship. Following this defeat there was some speculation that Cody would step down as manager, however, he decided to remain.

Kilkenny bounced back in 2002 with Cody guiding the team to a first league success since 1995. He later steered the team to a fourth Leinster title as Kilkenny recorded a narrow 0–19 to 0–17 defeat of fourteen-man Wexford. On 8 September 2002 Kilkenny faced first-round losers Clare in the All-Ireland decider. Kilkenny forwards Henry Shefflin and D. J. Carey combined to score 2-13 between them, as Kilkenny secured a 2–20 to 0–19 victory. It was a second All-Ireland title for Cody as manager.

Kilkenny's early season efforts in 2003 were hampered by an apparent rift between team captain Charlie Carter and Cody. Carter was said to have withdrawn from the panel during the latter stages of the league due to his unhappiness at being omitted from the team. Carter remained on the panel as Cody guided Kilkenny to a second successive league title following a stunning 5–14 to 5-13 extra-time defeat of Tipperary. The ill-feeling between Carter and Cody resurfaced when the former was once again overlooked in a provincial championship defeat of Dublin, resulting in him leaving the panel for good along with Brian McEvoy. In spite of these setbacks Cody later guided Kilkenny to a fifth successive Leinster title as manager following a 2–23 to 2–12 defeat of Wexford. The subsequent All-Ireland final on 14 September 2003 saw Kilkenny face Cork for the first time in four years, however, on the day of the game the marital breakdown of Cody's replacement captain D. J. Carey was revealed in a national newspaper. In the game itself both teams remained level for much of the game, exchanging tit-for-tat scores. A Setanta Ó hAilpín goal gave Cork the advantage, however, a Martin Comerford goal five minutes from the end settled the game as Kilkenny went on to win by 1–14 to 1-11. It was Cody's third All-Ireland triumph as manager.

=== Transition period ===
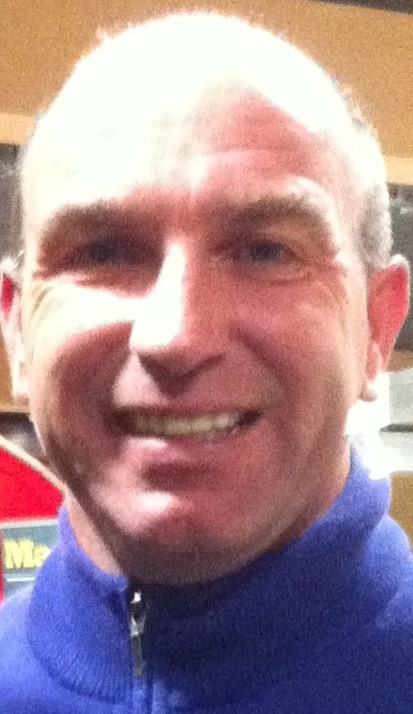
D. J. Carey was involved in Cody's first three All-Ireland victories as manager before his retirement in 2006.

In 2004 Cody suffered his first provincial championship defeat when a last-minute goal secured a 2–15 to 1-16 Leinster semi-final victory for Wexford. Kilkenny worked their way through the qualifiers and lined out against Cork in the All-Ireland decider on 12 September 2004. The game was expected to be a classic, however, a rain-soaked day made conditions difficult as Kilkenny aimed to secure a third successive championship. The first half was a low-scoring affair and provided little excitement for fans, however, the second half saw Cork completely take over. For the last twenty-three minutes Cork scored nine unanswered points and went on to win the game by 0–17 to 0–9. It was Cody's second All-Ireland defeat as manager, having lost to Cork in 1999 also.

Kilkenny were back in form in 2005, with Cody steering the team to a third league triumph in four years following a 3–20 to 0–15 victory over Clare. "The Cats" later struggled against a wasteful Wexford side, however, a 0–22 to 1–16 victory gave Cody a sixth Leinster title as manager. While a third successive All-Ireland showdown with Cork seemed likely, Galway defeated Kilkenny in the All-Ireland semi-final in one of the games of the decade. Once again there was speculation that Cody would step down, however, he decided to remain for an eighth season.

=== Four-in-a-row ===
The retirements of D. J. Carey, Peter Barry, and John Hoyne led to Cody refer to his 2006 panel as being "in transition". In spite if this his charges secured a fourth league title in five years following a 3–11 to 0–14 victory over Limerick. Cody's side later won a seventh Leinster title following another facile 1–23 to 1–12 victory over Wexford. On 3 September 2006 Kilkenny faced a Cork team who were presented with the opportunity to become the first side in nearly thirty years to secure three successive All-Ireland championships. Like previous encounters neither side took a considerable lead, however, Kilkenny had a vital goal from Aidan Fogarty. Cork were in arrears coming into the final few minutes, however, Ben O'Connor scored a late goal for Cork. It was too little too late as the Cats denied Cork on a score line of 1–16 to 1–13. It was a fourth All-Ireland title for Cody as manager, a victory he described as his greatest.

Cody guided Kilkenny to an eighth Leinster title under his stewardship in 2007, as the Cats asserted their provincial dominance and defeated Wexford by 2–24 to 1-12. On 2 September 2007 Kilkenny faced defeated Munster finalists and surprise All-Ireland semi-final winners Limerick in the championship decider. Kilkenny got off to a flying start with Eddie Brennan and Henry Shefflin scoring two goals within the first ten minutes to set the tone. Limerick launched a second-half comeback, however, "the Cats" were too powerful and cruised to a 2–19 to 1–15 victory. It was Cody's fifth All-Ireland victory as manager.

For the second time under Cody's management, Kilkenny were presented with the chance of claiming a much sought-after three-in-a-row of All-Ireland titles. After retaining the Leinster crown following a 5–21 to 0–17 drubbing of Wexford, Kilkenny subsequently faced Waterford in the All-Ireland decider on 8 September 2008. In a disappointingly one-sided final, Kilkenny produced a near perfect seventy minutes as Waterford endured a nightmare afternoon. A 23-point winning margin, 3–24 from play, only two wides in the entire match and eight scorers in all with Eddie Brennan and Henry Shefflin leading the way in a 3–30 to 1–13 victory. Cody's sixth All-Ireland title as manager secured a rare three-in-a-row for Kilkenny, while it also allowed Kilkenny to top the all-time roll of honour. After the game Cody was surprisingly chosen as the RTÉ Man of the Match.

"I have no idea, Marty. Did you check all the other frees as well to see were they dodgy? Maybe you should. Maybe you should...The referee – we’re supposed to say nothing about referees and I make a habit of saying absolutely nothing about referees. Diarmuid Kirwan, I’m certain in my head was going out to be the very best he possibly could be. You seem to have had a problem with him. You tell me."

— Cody responding to a series of questions from RTÉ's Marty Morrissey after the 2009 All-Ireland final.

In 2009 Cody set his sights on equaling Cork's seemingly unbeatable record of four successive All-Ireland titles. He began the year by guiding Kilkenny to a fifth league title during his tenure, as Kilkenny beat Tipperary by 2–26 to 4–17 with a thrilling extra-time victory. Cody's Kilkenny later claimed a tenth Leinster title as new challengers Dublin were bested by 2–18 to 0–18. On 6 September Kilkenny were poised to become the second team ever in the history of hurling to claim a fourth successive All-Ireland championship when they faced Tipperary in the decider. For long periods Tipperary looked the likely winners, however, late goals from Henry Shefflin, after a penalty was awarded, and substitute Martin Comerford finally killed off their efforts to secure a 2–22 to 0–23 victory. It was a seventh All-Ireland title for Cody as manager. In the aftermath of the game Cody was involved in a controversial interview with Marty Morrissey that was broadcast live on the Sunday Game. Cody was apparent in taking umbrage at Morrissey's line of questioning regarding the awarding of a controversial penalty which eventually turned the game in Kilkenny's favour.

=== Continued dominance ===
Cody's reappointment for a 12th successive season took just 30 seconds after Kilkenny chairman Paul Kinsella put his name forward for ratification. The so-called "drive for five" of All-Ireland titles gathered momentum as Cody tried to play down expectations. Kilkenny surrendered their league title, however, the campaign was not without incident for Cody. During a group stage game with Tipperary he became involved in a sideline altercation with rival manager Liam Sheedy. Sheedy shoved Cody, who was standing in the Tipperary technical area, before a war of words ensued between the pair. The Cats later extended their unbeaten run by claiming an eleventh Leinster title after a 1–19 to 1–12 defeat of Galway. For the second year in succession Kilkenny faced Tipperary in the All-Ireland decider on 5 September 2010. The Cats lost talisman Henry Shefflin due to injury, while Tipperary's Lar Corbett ran riot and scored a hat-trick of goals as Cody's side fell to a 4–17 to 1–18 defeat.

Cody's reappointment as manager was never in doubt and he was ratified for a 13th season in spite of the All-Ireland defeat. Kilkenny's stranglehold in Leinster continued in 2011. A 4–17 to 1–15 defeat of Dublin gave Cody's side a record-equaling seventh successive championship. Kilkenny subsequently faced Tipperary in the All-Ireland decider on 4 September 2011. Goals by Michael Fennelly and Richie Hogan in either half gave Kilkenny, who many viewed as the underdogs going into the game, a 2–17 to 1–16 victory. It was Cody's eighth All-Ireland title as manager.

There was speculation once again that Cody would step down as manager following the reclaiming of the All-Ireland, however, he returned for the 2012 season. His side asserted their dominance once again as Kilkenny secured a sixth league title under Cody's stewardship following a 3–21 to 0–16 demolition of old rivals Cork. Kilkenny were later shocked by Cody's old nemesis Galway in the Leinster decider, losing by 2–21 to 2–11, however, both sides subsequently met in the All-Ireland decider on 9 September 2012. Kilkenny had led going into the final stretch, however, Joe Canning struck a stoppage time equaliser to level the game at 2–13 to 0–19 and send the final to a replay for the first time since 1959. The replay took place three weeks later on 30 September 2012. Galway stunned the reigning champions with two first-half goals, however, Kilkenny's championship debutant Walter Walsh gave a man of the match performance, claiming a 1–3 haul. The 3–22 to 3–11 score line gave Cody a ninth All-Ireland victory as manager. In capturing a ninth championship title Cody bested Mick O'Dwyer's long-standing record after guiding the Kerry Gaelic football team to eight All-Ireland titles between 1975 and 1986.

Kilkenny's dominance showed no sign of abating in 2013, with Cody guiding the team to a seventh league title following a 2–17 to 0–20 defeat of Tipperary in the decider. An early exit from the championship led to some speculation that Cody would step down as manager, however, on 11 September 2013 it was confirmed that Cody would continue as Kilkenny manager for a 16th season but without selector Martin Fogarty who stood down.

=== Back-to-back All-Ireland successes ===
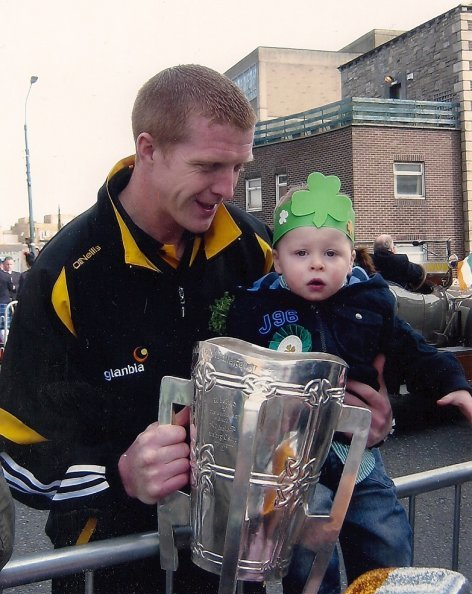
Henry Shefflin was intrinsically linked with Cody during their ten All-Ireland successes.

In 2014 Cody guided Kilkenny to their first ever three-in-a-row of league titles following a narrow one-point 2–25 to 1–27 extra-time victory over old rivals Tipperary. Cody's side subsequently secured a thirteenth Leinster title, as a dominant Kilkenny display gave the Cats a 0–24 to 1–9 defeat of Dublin. On 7 September 2014 Kilkenny faced Tipperary in the All-Ireland decider. In what some consider to be the greatest game of all time, the sides were level when Tipperary were awarded a controversial free. John O'Dwyer had the chance to win the game, however, his late free drifted wide resulting in a draw. The replay on 27 September 2014 was also a close affair. Goals from brothers Richie and John Power inspired Kilkenny to a 2–17 to 2–14 victory. It was Cody's tenth All-Ireland title as manager. In the aftermath of the All-Ireland victory Cody blasted referee Barry Kelly's decision to award a late free in the drawn game describing it as "criminal" and "wrong". He subsequently avoided a suspension for these comments as the GAA's Central Hearings Committee decided to quash the charge brought against Cody.

It was confirmed in November 2014 that Cody would remain as Kilkenny manager for 2015. After narrowly avoiding relegation in the league, Cody guided Kilkenny to a fourteenth Leinster title during his managerial reign following a 1–25 to 2–15 defeat of Galway in the decider. On 6 September 2015 Kilkenny renewed their rivalry with Galway in the All-Ireland decider. The team struggled in the first half, however, a T. J. Reid goal and a dominant second half display, which limited Galway to just 1–4, saw Kilkenny power to a 1–22 to 1–18 victory.

In 2016 Kilkenny won another Leinster title following victory over Galway in the final. They later drew with Waterford in the All Ireland Semi Final with the replay six days later being played in Semple Stadium. A classic game unfolded with the Deise pushing the Cats to the limit but Cody's side still emerged as two point winners. However, in the All Ireland Final against Tipperary Cody and his team's luck ran out as the Premier powered to a nine-point win to beat Kilkenny in the championship for the first time since they stopped the drive for five in 2010. It was Cody's fourth defeat as manager in the final.

On 19 February 2017, Kilkenny lost to Clare by 2–19 to 0–12 in Cusack Park in the 2017 National Hurling League, it was Kilkenny's biggest competitive defeat since he became manager of the side. Kilkenny were knocked out of the 2017 All-Ireland Senior Hurling Championship by Waterford in the second round of the qualifiers on 8 July losing by 4–23 to 2–22 after extra-time. It was Kilkenny's earliest exit from the Championship during Cody's rein as manager.

In 2018, After a Leinster final replay defeat to Galway, Kilkenny reached the All-Ireland quarter-finals where they were defeated by eventual All-Ireland champions Limerick.

2019 saw Kilkenny lose the Lenister final for the second year in a row, this time to Wexford. Wins over Cork and Limerick put the Cats into the All Ireland Final against Tipperary. Following the sending off of Richie Hogan in the first half, Tipperary powered to a 3.24 to 00.19 point win.

The 2020 season was disrupted by the ongoing COVID-19 pandemic and the season was put on hold during the latter stages of the league. The season eventually resumed in September with no spectators allowed to attend any matches. Cody guided his team to the Leinster Title after a victory over Galway. Their All Ireland Semi Final clash with Waterford turned into a thrilling encounter, with Kilkenny in full control in the first half and they led by seven points at half time. However Waterford took the game to the Cats in the second half and powered to a four-point victory to knock Cody's charges out of the Championship. It was their first Semi Final defeat since 2005.

In January 2021, it was confirmed that Cody would remain in charge for 2021, his 23rd year as manager. D.J Carey left his role as selector. Cody guided his team to back to back Lenister titles for the first time in five years with victory over Dublin but their All Ireland hopes ended after an All Ireland Semi Final extra time defeat to Cork.

In September 2021, it was confirmed that Cody would remain in charge for 2022, his 24th year as manager.

Kilkenny qualified for the 2022 All-Ireland Senior Hurling Championship Final but lost, giving Limerick three consecutive All-Ireland SHC titles. On 23 July 2022, Cody's resignation as manager was announced.

=== James Stephens ===
Shortly after resigning as Kilkenny manager, Cody was appointed as a selector with the James Stephens club in September 2022, then managed by Seamus Dwyer and also featuring John Sugrue in its backroom management team.

== Personal life ==
Cody is married to former Wexford camogie player Elsie Walsh, with whom he has two sons, Donnacha (born 1985) and Diarmuid (born 1994). Both Donncha and Diarmuid Cody have represented Kilkenny in various grades.

Cody's autobiography Cody, co-written with GAA journalist Martin Breheny, was published on 28 September 2009. Cody retired from his job as a primary school principal in 2015.

== Career statistics ==
=== As a player ===
Team	Year	National League			Leinster		All-Ireland		Total	
Team	Year	Division	Apps	Score	Apps	Score	Apps	Score	Apps	Score
Kilkenny	1972-73	Division 1A	3	0-02	1	0-01	1	0-00	5	0-03
Kilkenny	1973-74	Division 1A	2	0-00	0	0-00	0	0-00	2	0-00
Kilkenny	1974-75	Division 1A	3	0-00	2	0-01	1	0-00	6	0-01
Kilkenny	1975-76	Division 1A	10	0-00	2	0-00	0	0-00	12	0-00
Kilkenny	1976-77	Division 1A	7	0-02	2	1-04	0	0-00	9	1-06
Kilkenny	1977-78	Division 1A	5	1-03	2	1-04	2	1-02	4	2-09
Kilkenny	1978-79	Division 1A	0	0-00	0	0-00	0	0-00	0	0-00
Kilkenny	1979-80	Division 1A	0	0-00	2	0-00	0	0-00	2	0-00
Kilkenny	1980-81	Division 1B	0	0-00	1	0-00	0	0-00	1	0-00
Kilkenny	1981-82	Division 1B	9	0-00	2	0-00	2	0-00	13	0-00
Kilkenny	1982-83	Division 1	0	0-00	2	0-00	1	0-00	3	0-00
Kilkenny	1983-84	Division 1	0	0-00	0	0-00	0	0-00	0	0-00
Kilkenny	1984-85	Division 1	0	0-00	1	0-00	0	0-00	1	0-00
Kilkenny	1985-86	Division 1	0	0-00	0	0-00	0	0-00	0	0-00
Total			39	1-07	17	2-10	7	1-02	63	4-19

=== As a manager ===
As of match played 15 July 2018.

Managerial league-championship record by team and tenure
Team	From	To	Record				
Team	From	To	P	W	D	L	Win %
Kilkenny	16 November 1998	23 July 2022	233	173	12	48	74.2

== Honours ==
=== Player ===
St Kieran's College

- All-Ireland Colleges Senior Hurling Championship (1): 1971 (c)
- Leinster Colleges Senior Hurling Championship (2): 1971 (c), 1972

James Stephens

- All-Ireland Senior Club Hurling Championship (2): 1976, 1982
- Leinster Senior Club Hurling Championship (2): 1975, 1981
- Kilkenny Senior Hurling Championship (3): 1975, 1976, 1981

Kilkenny

- All-Ireland Senior Hurling Championship: 1975, 1982 (c), 1983
- Leinster Senior Hurling Championship (4): 1975, 1978, 1982 (c), 1983
- National Hurling League (2): 1975-76, 1981-82 (c)
- All-Ireland Under-21 Hurling Championship (2): 1974, 1975
- Leinster Under-21 Hurling Championship (2): 1974, 1975
- All-Ireland Minor Hurling Championship (1): 1972 (c)
- Leinster Minor Hurling Championship (2): 1971, 1972 (c)

Leinster

- Railway Cup (1): 1977 (sub)

=== Manager ===
Kilkenny

- All-Ireland Senior Hurling Championship (11): 2000, 2002, 2003, 2006, 2007, 2008, 2009, 2011, 2012, 2014, 2015
- Leinster Senior Hurling Championship (18): 1999, 2000, 2001, 2002, 2003, 2005, 2006, 2007, 2008, 2009, 2010, 2011, 2014, 2015, 2016, 2020, 2021, 2022
- National Hurling League (10): 2002, 2003, 2005, 2006, 2009, 2012, 2013, 2014, 2018, 2021
- Walsh Cup (7): 2005, 2006, 2007, 2009, 2012, 2014, 2017
- Oireachtas Tournament: (1) 1999

=== Individual ===
Honours

- All-Star (2): 1975, 1982
- Philips Sports Manager of the Year (1): 2003
- Philips Manager of the Month (10): Sept 2000, Sept 2002, Sept 2003, Sept 2006, Sept 2007, Sept 2008, Sept 2009, Sept 2011, Sept 2012, Sept 2015
- All-Ireland Senior Hurling Final Man of the Match (1): 2008
- Canon Hayes National Sport Award (1): 2003
- President's Award Glanbia Kilkenny Chamber of Commerce Business Awards (1): 2014
- Hotel Kilkenny and Kilkenny People Sports Star Supreme Award (1): 2009
- Rehab/Kilkenny People Person of the Year Community Service Award (1): 2009
- Overall Rehab/Kilkenny People Person of the Year Award (1): 2009
- Freedom of Kilkenny City (2008)
- Honorary Doctorate from University College Cork (2012)
- Honoured by ActionCOACH in Ireland as an Honorary Business Coach
- Irish Tatler Man Men of the Year Sports Award 2015

Achievements
Preceded by John Buckley (Cork)	All-Ireland MHC winning captain 1972	Succeeded by Kevin Robinson (Kilkenny)
Preceded by Pádraig Horan (Offaly)	All-Ireland SHC winning captain 1982	Succeeded by Liam Fennelly (Kilkenny)
Preceded by Jimmy Barry-Murphy (Cork)	All-Ireland SHC Final winning manager 2000	Succeeded by Nicky English (Tipperary)
Preceded by Nicky English (Tipperary)	All-Ireland SHC Final winning manager 2002–2003	Succeeded by Dónal O'Grady (Cork)
Preceded by John Allen (Cork)	All-Ireland SHC Final winning manager 2006–2009	Succeeded by Liam Sheedy (Tipperary)
Preceded by Liam Sheedy (Tipperary)	All-Ireland SHC Final winning manager 2011–2012	Succeeded by Davy Fitzgerald (Clare)
Preceded by Davy Fitzgerald (Clare)	All-Ireland SHC Final winning manager 2014-2015	Succeeded by Michael Ryan (Tipperary)
Sporting positions
Preceded by Maurice Mason	Kilkenny Senior Hurling Captain; 1982	Succeeded by Liam Fennelly
Preceded by Kevin Fennelly	Kilkenny Senior Hurling Manager; 1998–2022	Incumbent
Awards
Preceded by Eddie Brennan (Kilkenny)	All-Ireland SHC Final; Man of the Match; 2008	Succeeded by P. J. Ryan (Kilkenny)
