= Nickey Brennan =

Kilkenny hurler, manager, and Gaelic games administrator

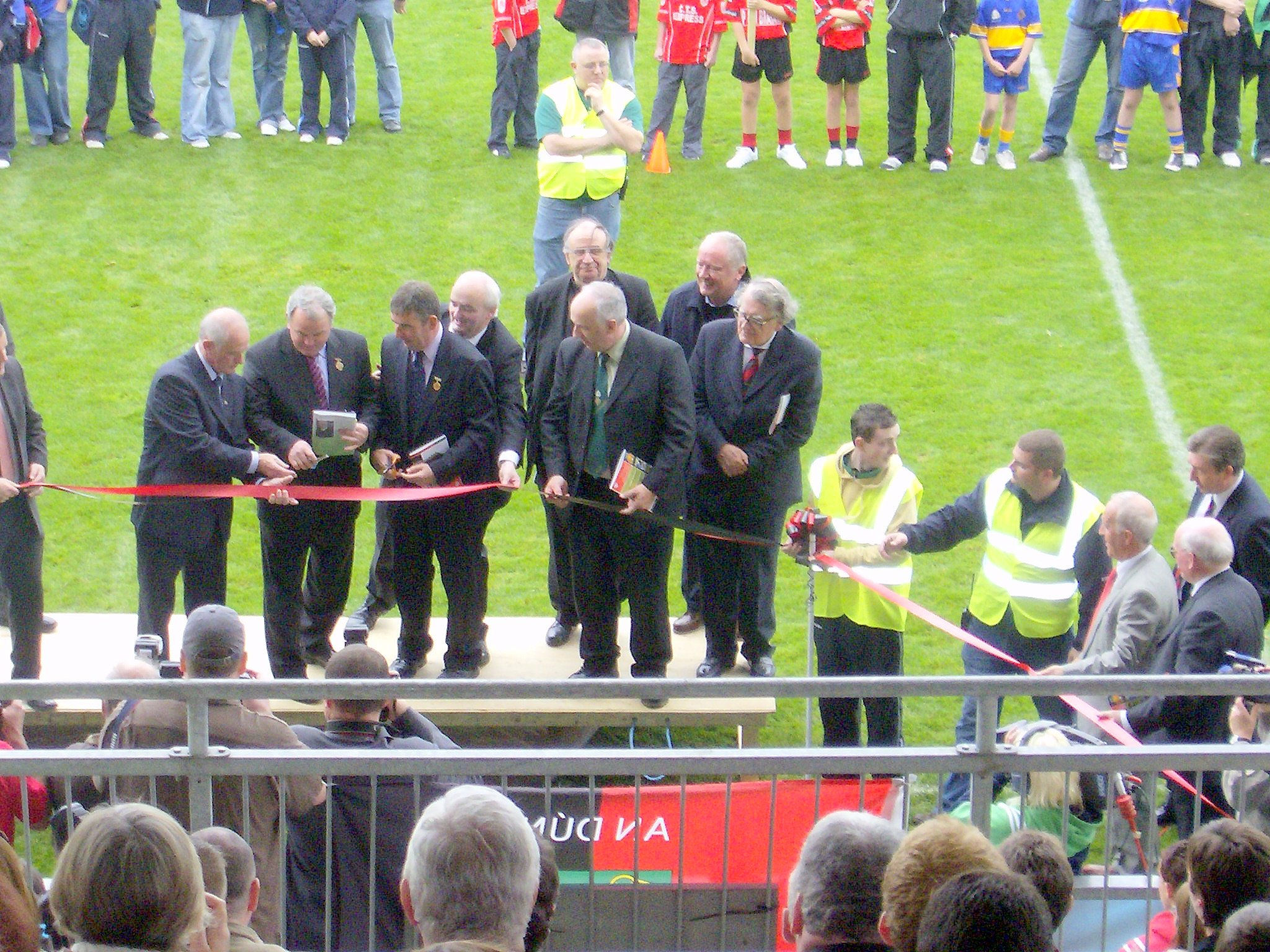

Personal information
- Native name: Nioclás Ó Braonáin (Irish)
- Born: 3 December 1953 (age 72) Conahy, County Kilkenny, Ireland
- Occupation: Retired purchasing manager
- Height: 5 ft 8 in (173 cm)

Sport
- Sport: Hurling
- Position: Right wing-back
Club
- Years: Club
- Conahy Shamrocks
Club titles
- Kilkenny titles: 0
Inter-county
Years	County	Apps (scores)
1974–1985	Kilkenny	14 (0-00)
Inter-county titles
- Leinster titles: 5
- All-Irelands: 5
- NHL: 2
- All Stars: 0

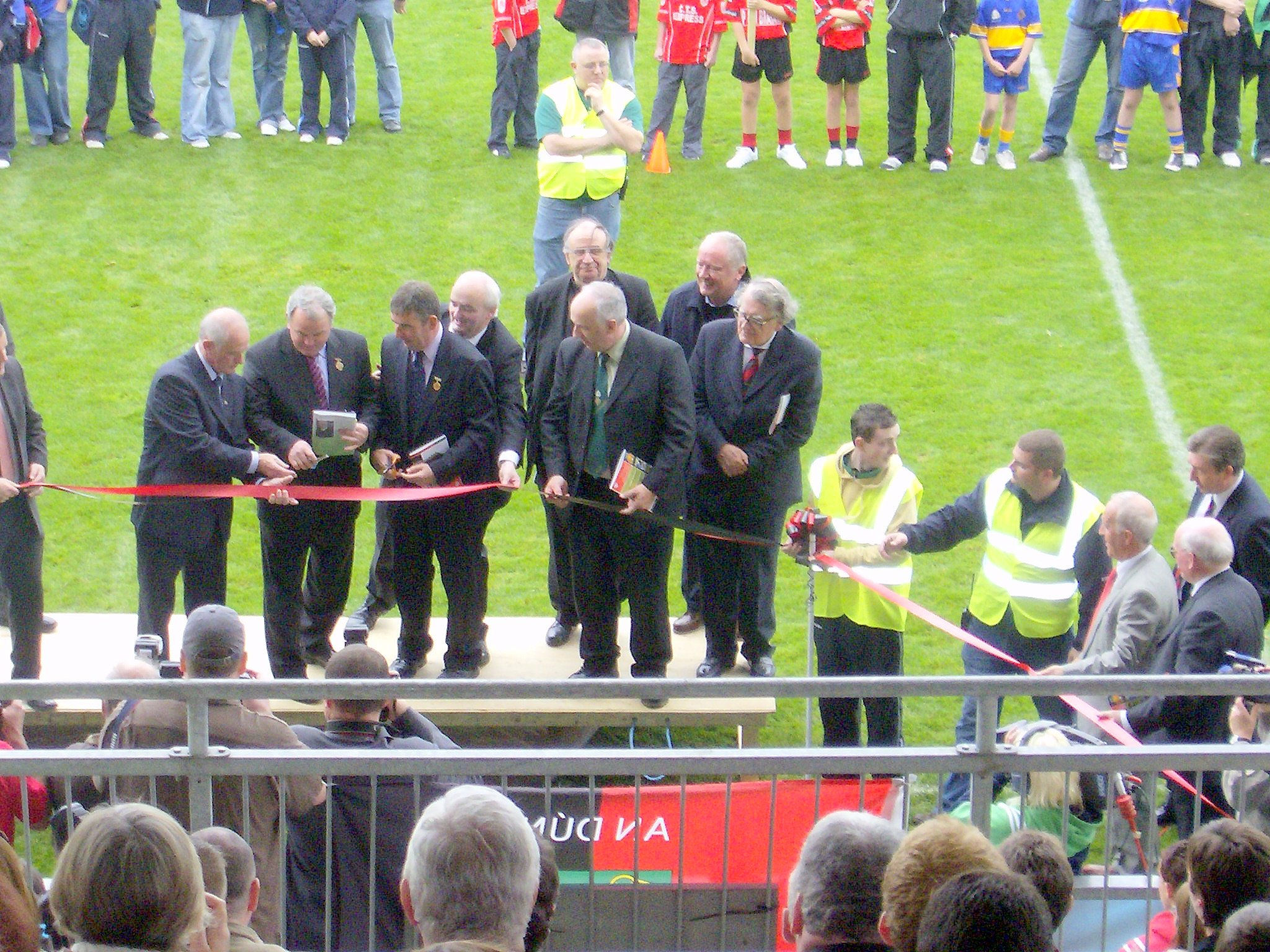
Brennan (second from left) cuts the ribbon at the official re-opening of Páirc Esler in Newry

Nicholas "Nickey" Brennan (born 3 December 1953) is an Irish former hurler, manager and Gaelic games administrator. He played as a right wing-back at senior level for the Kilkenny county team. More recently, he served as the 35th president of the Gaelic Athletic Association.

Brennan joined the team during the 1974 championship and was a regular member of the starting fifteen until his retirement after the 1985 championship. During that time he won two All-Ireland medals, three Leinster medals and two National Hurling League medals.

At club level Brennan had a lengthy career with Conahy Shamrocks.

In retirement from playing Brennan became involved in team management and coaching. He was manager of the Kilkenny senior team, having served as a selector for the previous four years. He also managed the county football team, and the county under-21 hurling team.

Brennan was also a Gaelic games administrator with the Kilkenny County Board and the Leinster Council before assuming the office of President of the Gaelic Athletic Association in 2006.

His brothers, Kieran and Canice, were also All-Ireland medalists with Kilkenny.

== Playing career ==
=== Club ===
Brennan, along with his brother, Kieran, played club hurling and football with his local club Conahy Shamrocks. He was a key part of the team that won both junior and intermediate titles in 1976 and 1977.

=== Inter-county ===
Brennan first came to prominence on the inter-county scene as a member of the Kilkenny minor hurling team. In 1971 he was at corner-back as the team secured a place in the provincial decider. A huge 7–18 to 3–5 trouncing of Wexford landed Brennan a Leinster medal. The subsequent All-Ireland decider saw reigning champions and three-in-a-row hopefuls Cork providing the opposition. A narrow 2–11 to 1–11 defeat was Kilkenny's lot on that occasion.

By 1974 Brennan had joined the Kilkenny under-21 team and was in his final year in the grade. A 3–8 to 1–5 defeat of reigning champions Kilkenny secured a Leinster medal for Brennan. The subsequent All-Ireland decider pitted Kilkenny against Waterford, who were making their first appearance in the final. A narrow 3–8 to 3–7 victory gave Brennan an All-Ireland Under-21 Hurling Championship medal.

That same year Brennan joined the Kilkenny senior team. He came on as a substitute in the provincial decider as Kilkenny narrowly defeated Wexford by 6–13 to 2–24. It was his first Leinster medal. Brennan was an unused substitute for Kilkenny's subsequent All-Ireland defeat of Limerick.

In 1975 Brennan was an unused substitute once again as Kilkenny retained their Leinster and All-Ireland titles.

Brennan was dropped from the panel for a number of seasons but returned to the starting fifteen in 1979. A 2–21 to 2–17 defeat of Wexford gave him a second Leinster medal on the field of play. Galway provided the opposition in the subsequent All-Ireland decider and took a two-point lead twelve minuted into the second half, however, they failed to score again. Two long-range goals from Liam "Chunky" O'Brien and Mick "Cloney" Brennan gave Kilkenny a 2–12 to 1–8 victory. It was Brennan's first All-Ireland medal on the field of play.

Kilkenny took a back seat to Offaly over the next few years, however, the team bounced back in 1982. A 2–14 to 1–11 defeat of Wexford in the decider gave Brennan a first National Hurling League medal. The subsequent championship campaign saw Kilkenny reach the decider once again. A 1–11 to 0–12 defeat of Offaly gave Brennan a third Leinster medal. The subsequent All-Ireland final saw the Cats face their old rivals from Cork. In spite of being regarded as underdogs, Christy Heffernan's two goals in a forty-second spell and a third by Ger Fennelly powered Kilkenny to a 3–18 to 1–15 victory, a game in which Brennan held Cork's famed captain Jimmy Barry-Murphy scoreless for 70 minutes. It was Brennan's second All-Ireland medal on the field of play.

Kilkenny retained their National League title in 1982 following a 2–14 to 2–12 defeat of Limerick. It was Brennan's second winners' medal in the secondary competition. In spite of this he was later dropped from the starting fifteen and was an unused substitute as Kilkenny retained their Leinster and All-Ireland crowns. Brennan retired from inter-county hurling shortly after.

== Post-playing career ==
In retirement from hurling Brennan became involved in the administration of the Gaelic Athletic Association. In 1990 Brennan managed the Kilkenny under-21 hurling team to All-Ireland success over Tipperary. In 1991 he commenced a four-year term as chairman of the Kilkenny County Board. In 1995 he succeeded Ollie Walsh as manager of the Kilkenny senior hurling team. Brennan had mixed success in this position. He guided his native-county to a Leinster final in 1997; however, his team was defeated by Wexford. His term as manager came to end when Kilkenny were defeated by the eventual All-Ireland champions, Clare, in the All-Ireland semi-final. Brennan also served as manager of the Kilkenny senior football team during the eighties.

Brennan continued an involvement in the administration side of the GAA during the nineties and was elected to the position of chairman of the Leinster Council. It was during this incumbency in this post that Brennan launched his bid to become president of the GAA. In April 2005 he defeated his Munster Council counterpart, Christy Cooney, and was duly elected president. He took up this position in 2006.

Brennan travelled 160,000 miles in Ireland alone during his three years as president, and visited Great Britain, Europe, North America, Asia, Australia and the Middle East on several occasions, meeting dignitaries such as New York City mayor Michael Bloomberg along the way. His term of office ended in 2009, when he was succeeded by Christy Cooney, who had won the subsequent election.

Sporting positions
Preceded by Ollie Walsh	Kilkenny Senior Hurling Manager; 1995–1997	Succeeded by Kevin Fennelly
Preceded by Paddy Buggy	Chairman of the Kilkenny County Board; 1991–1994	Succeeded by John Healy
Preceded by Seán Kelly	President of the Gaelic Athletic Association; 2006–2009	Succeeded by Christy Cooney
