= Tommy Maher =

Irish Catholic priest, hurler and Hurling manager

Personal information
- Native name: Tomás Ó Meachair (Irish)
- Nickname: Fr. Tommy
- Born: 25 April 1922 Gowran, County Kilkenny, Ireland
- Died: 25 March 2015 (aged 92)
- Occupation: Roman Catholic priest

Sport
- Sport: Hurling
- Position: Left wing-forward
Clubs
- Years: Club
- 1944-1945 1946-1947: Castle Rovers (Gowran); Thomastown
Club titles
- Kilkenny titles: 0
Inter-county*
Years	County	Apps (scores)
1945-1946	Kilkenny	1 (1-1)
Inter-county titles
- Leinster titles: 1
- All-Irelands: 0
- NHL: 0
- *Inter County team apps and scores correct as of 19:06, 16 June 2025.

Fr Tommy Maher (25 April 1922 – 25 March 2015) was an Irish Catholic priest and Irish Hurler who played as left wing-forward for the Kilkenny senior team.

Born in Gowran, County Kilkenny, Maher first played competitive hurling during his schooling at St. Kieran's College. He arrived on the inter-county scene at the age of twenty-three when he first linked up with the Kilkenny senior team. He made his senior debut during the 1945 championship. Maher had a brief inter-county career and won one Leinster medal as a non-playing substitute. He was an All-Ireland runner-up on one occasion.

At club level Maher had a brief career with Castle Rovers, Gowran and Thomastown.

In retirement from playing Maher became involved in team management and coaching. As trainer and coach of the Kilkenny senior team for over twenty years he guided the team to seven All-Ireland titles, fourteen Leinster titles and three National Hurling League titles. Maher also found much success at club level with Mullinavat and at colleges' level with St. Kieran's College.

== Honours ==
=== Player ===
St. Kieran's College

- Leinster Colleges Senior Hurling Championship (3): 1939, 1940, 1941

Kilkenny

- Leinster Senior Hurling Championship (1): 1946

Leinster

- All-Ireland Colleges Senior Hurling Inter-Provincial Championship (1): 1940

=== Trainer ===
Mullinavat

- Kilkenny Junior Hurling Championship (1): 1984

Kilkenny

- All-Ireland Senior Hurling Championship (7): 1957, 1963, 1967, 1969, 1972, 1974, 1975
- Leinster Senior Hurling Championship (14) 1957, 1958, 1959, 1963, 1964, 1966, 1967, 1969, 1971, 1972, 1973, 1974, 1975, 1978
- National Hurling League (3) 1962, 1966, 1976

== Clerical career ==
Monsignor Maher studied for the priesthood in Maynooth College and was ordained a Catholic priest for the Diocese of Ossory in 1948, worked as a curate in Dublin before moving back to Kilkenny in 1955 and taught Mathematics, Physics and Chemistry at St Kieran's College, Kilkenny, from 1963, and served as President of St Kieran’s College from 1973 to 1983. He left St Kieran’s to become parish priest of Mullinavat in South Kilkenny where he remained until he retired in 1998. He was awarded the church title of Monsignor from the Catholic church.
