= Paddy Broderick (hurler) =

Irish hurler

Personal information
- Native name: Pádraig Ó Bruadau (Irish)
- Born: 1949 (age 76–77) Johnstown, County Kilkenny, Ireland
- Height: 5 ft 7 in (170 cm)

Sport
- Sport: Hurling
- Position: Left wing-forward
Club
- Years: Club
- Fenians
Club titles
- Kilkenny titles: 5
- Leinster titles: 1
- All-Ireland Titles: 0
Inter-county
- Years: County
- 1971-1973: Kilkenny
Inter-county titles
- Leinster titles: 1
- All-Irelands: 1
- NHL: 0
- All Stars: 0

Patrick Broderick (born 1949) is an Irish former hurler. At club level, he played with Fenians and at inter-county level with the Kilkenny senior hurling team.

== Career ==
Broderick played his club hurling with the newly-formed Fenians club in Johnstown. He won his first Kilkenny SHC medal after a 2–11 to 3–05 defeat of James Stephens in the final in 1971. Broderick claimed further honours when Fenians won three successive Kilkenny SHC titles between 1972 and 1974. He also won a Leinster Club SHC medal before a defeat by St Finbarr's in the 1975 All-Ireland Club SHC final. Broderick won a fifth and final Kilkenny SHC medal in 1977.

Having never played in the minor or under-21 grades, Broderick made his first appearance for Kilkenny as a member of the senior team in 1971. It took him two years before he established himself on the team. Broderick won a Leinster SHC medal before lining out in the 1–21 to 1–14 defeat by Limerick in the 1973 All-Ireland SHC final. He is the last player to wear glasses in an All-Ireland final.

== Honours ==
Fenians

- Leinster Senior Club Hurling Championship: 1974
- Kilkenny Senior Hurling Championship: 1970, 1972, 1973, 1974, 1977

Kilkenny

- Leinster Senior Hurling Championship: 1973
