= P. J. Ryan Sr. =

Irish hurler

P. J. Ryan
Personal information
- Native name: P. S. Ó Riain (Irish)
- Born: 1952 (age 73–74) Johnstown, County Kilkenny, Ireland
- Occupation: Caravan builder
- Height: 5 ft 9 in (175 cm)

Sport
- Sport: Hurling
- Position: Goalkeeper
Club
- Years: Club
- Fenians
Club titles
- Kilkenny titles: 5
- Leinster titles: 1
- All-Ireland Titles: 0
Inter-county
- Years: County
- 1973-1979: Kilkenny
Inter-county titles
- Leinster titles: 3
- All-Irelands: 3
- NHL: 0
- All Stars: 0

Patrick James Ryan (born 1952) is an Irish retired hurler who played for Kilkenny Senior Championship club Fenians. He also played for the Kilkenny senior hurling team and was a member of the All-Ireland Championship-winning teams in 1974, 1975 and 1979. His son, also P. J. Ryan, was a seven-time All-Ireland medal-winner with Kilkenny.

== Honours ==
Fenians

- Leinster Senior Club Hurling Championship (1): 1974
- Kilkenny Senior Hurling Championship (5): 1970, 1972, 1973, 1974, 1977

Kilkenny

- All-Ireland Senior Hurling Championship (3): 1974, 1975, 1979
- Leinster Senior Hurling Championship (3): 1974, 1975, 1979
