= P. J. (given name) =

The initials P. J. or PJ are used by several noted people. This is often an abbreviation for their first and middle names, but can also be used when their first name starts with P, and the 'J' stands for the suffix Junior (as in P. J. Fleck), or can even be the legal first name. As it is often an abbreviation, it has no actual meaning.

== Notable people with the given name "P. J." ==
=== A ===
- P. J. Abbott (born 1964), American racing driver
- P. J. Akeeagok (born 1984), Canadian politician
- P. J. Alexander (born 1978), American football player
- P. J. Antony (1925–1979), Indian actor
- P. J. Austin (born 2000), American sprinter
- P. J. Axelsson (born 1975), Swedish ice hockey player

=== B ===
- P. J. Berry (born 1982), American football player
- P. J. Boudousqué (born 1988), American actor
- P. J. Bradley (1940–2017), Northern Irish politician
- P. J. Brady (1868–1943), Irish politician
- P. J. Brennan (born 1986), American actor
- P. J. Brophy (1918–1998), Irish priest
- P. J. Brown (born 1969), American basketball player
- P. J. Brown (soccer) (born 1973), American soccer player
- P. J. Byrne (born 1974), American actor

=== C ===
- P. J. Carey (1953–2012), American baseball player
- P. J. Carlesimo (born 1949), American basketball coach
- P. J. Castellaneta (born 1960), American film director
- P. J. Chesson (born 1978), American racing driver
- P. J. Conkwright (1905–1986), American graphic designer
- P. J. Conlon (born 1993), Irish-American baseball player
- P.J. Connelly (born 1983), American baseball player and politician
- P. J. Cosijn (1840–1899), Dutch scholar
- P. J. Cowan (born 1933), American author
- P. J. Cowan (golfer) (born 1967), American golfer
- P. J. Crook (born 1945), English painter
- P. J. Cuddy, Irish hurler

=== D ===
- P. J. Daniels (born 1982), American football player
- P. J. Delaney (disambiguation), multiple people
- P. J. Dranginis (1909–1995), American football coach
- P. J. Duke (1925–1950), Irish Gaelic footballer

=== F ===
- P. J. Fleck (born 1980), American football coach
- P. J. Forbes (born 1967), American baseball player
- P. J. Franklin (born 1977), American football player

=== G ===
- P. J. Gallagher (disambiguation), multiple people
- P. J. Garvan (1928–2021), Irish hurler
- P. J. Garvey (1971–2021), Irish hurler
- P. J. Gillic (born 1967), Irish Gaelic footballer

=== H ===
- P. J. Hairston (born 1992), American basketball player
- P. J. Hall (born 1995), American football player
- P. J. Hannikainen (1854–1924), Finnish composer
- PJ Harvey (born 1969), English musician
- P. J. Higgins (born 1993), American baseball player
- P. J. Hill (born 1987), American football player
- P. J. Hogan (born 1962), Australian film director
- P. J. Holden (born 1969), Northern Irish artist
- P. J. Honey (1922–2005), Irish historian
- P. J. Hyett (born 1983), American software developer

=== J ===
- P. J. Jacobsen (born 1993), American motorcycle racer
- P. J. Johns (born 1958), American soccer player
- P. J. Johnson (born 1996), American football player
- P. J. Jones (born 1969), American racing driver
- P. J. Joseph (born 1941), Indian politician
- P. J. Jules (born 2001), American football player

=== K ===
- P. J. Kavanagh (1931–2015), English poet
- P. J. Keefe, American football coach
- P. J. Keenan (1912–1979), American politician
- P. J. Kelly (1843–1908), Irish politician
- P. J. Kennedy (1858–1929), American politician and businessman
- P. J. King, Irish activist
- P. J. Krouse (1877–1944), American architect
- P. J. Kurien (born 1941), Indian politician

=== L ===
- P. J. Lane (born 1984), Australian actor
- P. J. Lawrence (born 1947), Indian bishop
- PJ Liguori (born 1990), British YouTuber
- P. J. Locke (born 1997), American football player
- P. J. Lynch (born 1962), Irish artist

=== M ===
- P. J. Mara (1942–2016), Irish politician
- P. J. Marcellino (born 1978), Portuguese-Canadian filmmaker
- P. J. Marshall (1933–2025), British historian
- P. J. McDonald (born 1982), Irish jockey
- P. J. McElroy (1932–2022), Northern Irish Gaelic footballer
- P. J. McGowan (born 1951/1952), Irish Gaelic footballer
- P. J. McGrath (1941–2021), Irish Gaelic footballer
- P. J. McIntyre, Irish hurler
- P. J. McMahon (disambiguation), multiple people
- P. J. Molloy (born 1952), Irish hurler
- P. J. Moloney (1869–1947), Irish politician
- P. J. Moonie (1936–2016), Australian radio operator
- P. J. Morley (1931–2012), Irish politician
- P. J. Morris, English cricketer
- P. J. Morrison (born 1998), Scottish footballer
- P. J. Murrihy, Irish singer-songwriter
- P. J. Mustipher (born 1998), American football player

=== N ===
- P. J. Narayanan (born 1963), Indian professor
- P. J. Nolan (born 1987), Irish hurler

=== O ===
- P. J. Ochlan, American actor
- P. J. O'Connell (born 1970), Irish hurler
- P. J. Olsson (born 1972), American singer
- P. J. O'Mullan (born 1974), Irish hurler
- P. J. O'Rourke (1947–2022), American journalist

=== P ===
- P. J. Pacifico (born 1972), American singer-songwriter
- P. J. Patterson (born 1935), Jamaican politician
- P. J. Pedroncelli (born 1990), American racing driver
- P. J. Perry (born 1941), Canadian saxophonist
- P. J. Pesce (born 1961), American film director
- P. J. Pilittere (born 1981), American baseball coach
- P. J. Plauger (born 1944), American entrepreneur
- P. J. Polowski (born 1973), American soccer player
- P. J. Pope (born 1984), American football player
- P. J. Prinsloo (born 1978), South African actor
- P. J. Proby (born 1938), American singer-songwriter

=== Q ===
- P. J. Qualter (1943–2019), Irish hurler

=== R ===
- P. J. Ramster, Australian film director
- P. J. G. Ransom (1935–2019), Scottish author
- P. J. Rhodes (1940–2021), British historian
- P. J. Ruttledge (1892–1952), Irish politician
- P. J. Ryan (disambiguation), multiple people

=== S ===
- P. J. Sarma (1933–2014), Indian artist
- P. J. Scully (born 1994), Irish hurler
- P. J. Sebastian, Indian activist
- P. J. Sheehan (1933–2020), Irish politician
- P. J. Smyth (born 1948), Irish Gaelic footballer
- P. J. Snow (born 1948), Australian neuroscientist
- P. J. Soles (born 1950), German-American actress
- P. J. Solomon (born 1976), New Zealand rugby union footballer
- P. J. Starks (born 1982), American film director
- P. J. Stock (born 1975), Canadian ice hockey player

=== T ===
- P. J. Thomas (disambiguation), multiple people
- P. J. Tracy (1946–2016), American author
- P. J. Tucker (born 1985), American basketball player

=== V ===
- P. J. van Lill (born 1983), Namibian rugby union footballer
- P. J. Vatikiotis (1928–1997), Greek-American political scientist

=== W ===
- P. J. Walker (born 1995), American football player
- P. J. Walters (born 1985), American baseball player
- P. J. Washington (born 1998), American basketball player
- P. J. Williams (born 1993), American football player
- P. J. Williams (offensive lineman) (born 2004), American football player
- P. J. Wolfson (1903–1979), American screenwriter
- PJ Woodland (born 2005), American football player

== Fictional characters ==
- P. J. Hasham, a character on the Australian police drama Blue Heelers
- PJ Duncan, a character from Disney Channel’s Good Luck Charlie

== See also ==
- PJ (disambiguation), a disambiguation page for "PJ"
- Patrick (given name), a page for people with the given name "Patrick", often shortened into "P. J."
