= 1973 All-Ireland Senior Hurling Championship final =

1973 All-Ireland Senior Hurling Final
- Event: 1973 All-Ireland Senior Hurling Championship
Limerick	Kilkenny
1-21	1-14
- Date: 2 September 1973
- Venue: Croke Park, Dublin
- Referee: Mick Slattery (Clare)
- Attendance: 59,009
- Weather: Rain

The 1973 All-Ireland Senior Hurling Championship Final was the 86th All-Ireland Final and the culmination of the 1973 All-Ireland Senior Hurling Championship, an inter-county hurling tournament for the country teams on the island of Ireland. The match was, held at Croke Park, Dublin, on 2 September 1973, and was between Limerick and Kilkenny. The Leinster champions (Kilkenny) lost to their Munster opponents (Limerick) on a score line of 1-21 to 1-14.

== Background ==
This was Kilkenny's third consecutive appearance in an All-Ireland final. After losing to Tipperary in 1971, 'the Cats' defeated Cork to take their eighteenth championship title in 1972. Limerick, having won the Munster title for the first time since 1955, were lining out in a first All-Ireland final since 1940 when they claimed their sixth championship crown.

The two teams last met in a major game in the semi-final of the 1971-1972 National Hurling League. Limerick were the winners on that occasion with a score line of 3-13 to 2-13. Both teams last met in the championship in the 1940 All-Ireland final when Limerick won. The 1973 All-Ireland final was the sixth championship clash between the two. Limerick had three victories - the All-Ireland finals of 1897, 1936 and 1940 - while Kilkenny defeated Limerick in the finals of 1933 and 1935.

== All-Ireland final ==
=== Overview ===
Between the Leinster and All-Ireland deciders, Kilkenny lost many of their key players for various reasons: Éamonn Morrissey was forced to emigrate to Australia, Jim Treacy was ruled out due to injury, Kieran Purcell couldn’t play because of appendicitis, and Eddie Keher couldn’t play because of a broken collar bone. With Keher and Purcell sidelined, Pat Delaney would take up the mantle as Kilkenny’s chief scorer. Delaney was an exceptional half-forward who was too quick for most defenders. Limerick made a decisive selectorial decision. Instead of using a defender to mark him, the Limerick selectors moved Éamonn Cregan from the forwards to centre-back, where he was charged with the task of nullifying the Kilkenny marksman.

Limerick also had serious losses that day. Mickey Graham broke his leg in the National League Final that year and was thus a spectator. Also out were Jim O'Donnell, who was also injured and was man of the match in the first round against Clare that year; and Mick O'Loughlin, who would have been their first choice corner back, but could not commit himself to the cause that year. Leonard Enright, who would subsequently win 3 All Stars in his early thirties, was engaged in other sports in '73 and thus also unavailable.

Because the weather on the day of the final was wet, with heavy showers falling before and during the match, the pitch was slippery and the sliotar was difficult to control.

=== Match report ===
At 3:15pm Mick Slattery of Clare threw in the sliotar and the game was on. The opening forty minutes saw Kilkenny set the standard. Pat Delaney, in spite of Éamonn Cregan doing an excellent man-marking job, scored the opening goal of the game to give Kilkenny the lead. Twice Limerick fell behind in the opening half and twice they fought back. At one stage they trailed by 1-5 to 0-3, however, they held Kilkenny scoreless for two nine-minute spells in the first-half. At the short whistle Limerick were very much on top and left the pitch leading by 0-12 to 1-7.

Five minutes after the restart Kilkenny levelled the scores courtesy of points by Claus Dunne and Liam ‘Chunky’ O’Brien. A minute later Kilkenny went a point ahead when Limerick keeper Séamus Horgan saved from a palmed shot by Mick Crotty. Although the attempt on goal was blocked, the sliotar flew over the bar for a Kilkenny point. Shortly afterwards Richie Bennis had the sides level when he converted a free from forty yards out. A minute later Limerick secured the match-winning score. A puck-out from Kilkenny keeper Noel Skehan was quickly sent back in his direction by Liam O'Donoghue. Skehan saved the shot but Mossie Dowling and Ned Rea were waiting for the rebound. Dowling became the Limerick hero as he turned the sliotar past Skehan and into the net. Although the match was far from over this was the vital score that gave Limerick the title. The entire second-half saw Limerick show their supremacy. Kilkenny were held scoreless for twenty-three minutes during the second-half while Limerick went on a point-scoring spree for the final quarter. Midfield marshal Richie Bennis finished the game with ten points to his name as Limerick claimed their seventh All-Ireland crown with a 1-21 to 1-14 victory.

=== Match details ===
1973-09-02
15:15 UTC+1
Final

Limerick	1-21 – 1-14	Kilkenny
R. Bennis (0-10), M. Dowling (1-1), É. Grimes (0-4), F. Nolan (0-2), N. Rea (0-2), B. Hartigan (0-1), J. McKenna (0-1).		C. Dunne (0-7), P. Delaney (1-1), M. Crotty (0-3), L. O'Brien (0-2), M. Brennan(0-1).

Croke Park, Dublin
Attendance: 59,009
Referee: M. Slattery (Clare)

Limerick			Kilkenny
Goalkeeper	Séamus Horgan		Goalkeeper	Noel Skehan
Right corner-back	Willie Moore		Right corner-back	Phil 'Fan' Larkin
Full-back	Pat Hartigan		Full-back	Nicky Orr
Left corner-back	Jim O'Brien		Left corner-back	Phil Cullen
Right wing-back	Phil Bennis		Right wing-back	Pat Lawlor
Centre-back	Éamonn Cregan		Centre-back	Pat Henderson
Left wing-back	Seán Foley		Left wing-back	Brian Cody
Midfield	Richie Bennis	Match rules:	Midfield	Frank Cummins
Midfield	Éamonn Grimes (c)	80 minutes normal time.	Midfield	Liam 'Chunky O'Brien
Right wing-forward	Bernie Hartigan	Replay if scores level.	Right wing-forward	Claus Dunne
Centre-forward	Mossie Dowling	Three substitutes allowed.	Centre-forward	Pat Delaney (c)
Left wing-forward	Liam O'Donoghue		Left wing-forward	Paddy Broderick
Right corner-forward	Frankie Nolan		Right corner-forward	Mick Crotty
Full-forward	Ned Rea		Full-forward	Jim Lynch
Left corner-forward	Joe McKenna		Left corner-forward	Mick 'Cloney' Brennan
Substitute	Tom Ryan		Substitute	Kieran Purcell
Substitute	Paudie Fitzmaurice		Substitute	Willie Harte
Substitute	Andy Dunworth		Substitute	John Kinsella
