= Shem Delaney =

Irish hurler

Personal information
- Native name: Séamus Ó Dúláinne (Irish)
- Born: Johnstown, County Kilkenny, Ireland
- Occupation: Butcher

Sport
- Sport: Hurling
- Position: Right corner-back
Club
- Years: Club
- Fenians
Club titles
- Kilkenny titles: 4
- Leinster titles: 1
- All-Ireland Titles: 0
Inter-county*
Years	County	Apps (scores)
1974	Kilkenny	0 (0-00)
Inter-county titles
- Leinster titles: 1
- All-Irelands: 1
- NHL: 0
- All Stars: 0
- *Inter County team apps and scores correct as of 21:30, 7 December 2014.

Shem Delaney is an Irish retired hurler who played as a right corner-back for the Kilkenny senior team.

Born in Johnstown, County Kilkenny, Deelaney first arrived on the inter-county scene when he first linked up with the Kilkenny senior team during the 1974 championship. Delenay was an unused substitute during that championship campaign, however, he did win a set of All-Ireland and Leinster medals.

At club level Delaney is a one-time Leinster medallist with Fenians. In addition to this he has also won four championship medals.

Delaney's brother, Pat Delaney, and his brother-in-law, Billy Fitzpatrick, and won nine All-Ireland medals between them between 1969 and 1983. His nephew, P. J. Delaney, won an All-Ireland medal in 1993, while his son J. J. Delaney has enjoyed numerous All-Ireland successes.

Delaney retired from inter-county hurling after the 1974 championship.

== Honours ==
=== Team ===
Fenians

- Leinster Senior Club Hurling Championship (1): 1974
- Kilkenny Senior Hurling Championship (4): 1970, 1972, 1973, 1977

Kilkenny

- All-Ireland Senior Hurling Championship (1): 1974 (sub)
- Leinster Senior Hurling Championship (1): 1974 (sub)
