= Brian Tobin (hurler) =

Irish hurler

Personal information
- Born: 1949 Kinsale, County Cork, Ireland
- Died: 1 July 2006 (aged 56) College Road, Cork, Ireland
- Occupation: Insurance agent

Sport
- Sport: Hurling
- Position: Full-back
Club
- Years: Club
- Blackrock
Club titles
- Cork titles: 2
- Munster titles: 1
- All-Ireland Titles: 1
Inter-county
Years	County	Apps (scores)
1968-1971	Cork	0 (0-00)
Inter-county titles
- Munster titles: 0
- All-Irelands: 0
- NHL: 0

John Brian Tobin (1949 – 1 July 2006) was an Irish hurler. At club level he played with Blackrock and was also a member of the Cork senior hurling team. He usually lined out as a full-back.

== Career ==
Tobin played at juvenile and underage levels with the Blackrock club before joining the club's senior team. He won two County Championship titles and was a part of the team that won the 1972 All-Ireland Club Championship. Tobin first appeared on the inter-county scene during a five-year underage spell with Cork. After being a non-playing substitute on Cork's 1966 All-Ireland Minor Championship-winning team, he later won three successive All-Ireland Under-21 Championship titles between 1968 and 1970. Tobin was drafted onto the Cork senior hurling team in 1968 and played a number of league and tournament games for Cork over the following few seasons, however, he failed to break onto the championship team.

== Death ==
Tobin died after a period of illness on 1 July 2006.

== Honours ==
Blackrock

- All-Ireland Senior Club Hurling Championship: 1972
- Munster Senior Club Hurling Championship: 1971
- Kilkenny Senior Hurling Championship: 1971, 1973

Cork

- All-Ireland Under-21 Hurling Championship: 1968, 1969, 1970
- Munster Under-21 Hurling Championship: 1968, 1969, 1970
- All-Ireland Minor Hurling Championship: 1966
- Munster Minor Hurling Championship: 1966, 1967
