= John Kinsella (hurler) =

Irish hurler (1947–2024)

Personal information
- Native name: Seán Cinsealach (Irish)
- Born: 3 September 1947 Bennettsbridge, County Kilkenny, Ireland
- Died: 1 January 2024 (aged 76) Kilkenny, Ireland
- Occupations: Mechanic, musician, broadcaster, car salesman
- Height: 5 ft 9 in (175 cm)

Sport
- Sport: Hurling
- Position: Right wing-forward
Club
- Years: Club
- Bennettsbridge
Club titles
- Kilkenny titles: 3
Inter-county*
Years	County	Apps (scores)
1967-1973	Kilkenny	13
Inter-county titles
- Leinster titles: 4
- All-Irelands: 2
- NHL: 0
- All Stars: 0
- *Inter County team apps and scores correct as of 20:01, 15 November 2014.

John Kinsella (3 September 1947 – 1 January 2024) was an Irish hurler. At club level he played with Bennettsbridge and was also a member of the Kilkenny senior hurling team.

== Career ==
Kinsella first played hurling at juvenile and underage levels with the Bennettsbridge club, as well as with Kilkenny City Vocational School. He enjoyed his first major success when, in 1963, he was part of the Kilkenny team that beat Cork City to win the All-Ireland Vocational Schools HC. Kinsella eventually progressed to the Bennettsbridge senior team and won his first Kilkenny SHC after a defeat of Mooncoin in the 1966 final. Kinsella claimed a second successive SHC medal in 1967, before captaining Bennettsbridge to the inaugural Kilkenny U21HC title. He won a third and final SHC medal after a defeat of Fenians in the 1971 final.

Kinsella's first success at club level resulted in him being drafted onto the Kilkenny senior hurling team in 1967. He won a Leinster SHC medal as a substitute that year before claiming an All-Ireland SHC after coming on as a substitute in the defeat of Tipperary. He ended the season with an Oireachtas Cup medal. Kinsella won his first Leinster SHC medal on the field of play in 1969, however, he was dropped from the panel for the subsequent All-Ireland final defeat of Cork.

After leaving the inter-county scene, Kinsella spent some time playing soccer with Evergreen and East End United. He was eventually recalled to the Kilkenny team and won a third Leinster SHC medal in 1972. He later claimed a second All-Ireland SHC medal after playing at wing-forward in the defeat of Cork. Kinsella won a fourth Leinster SHC medal the following year and came on as a substitute for Jim Lynch in the 1973 All-Ireland final defeat by Limerick, in what was his last championship appearance for Kilkenny.

== Personal life and death ==
His cousins, Jack Mulcahy and Paddy Moran, also won All-Ireland SHC titles with Kilkenny. Kinsella worked as a mechanic for much of his life. He was also a performer with the Capri Showband and worked in local radio, initially in 1979 with KCR before a daytime stint on Radio Kilkenny and then various roles on KCLR.

Kinsella was diagnosed with cancer in 2002 and later battled Parkinson's disease. He died at St. Luke's General Hospital on the New Year's Day of 2024, at the age of 76.

== Honours ==
Bennettsbridge

- Kilkenny Senior Hurling Championship: 1966, 1967, 1971
- Kilkenny Under-21 Hurling Championship: 1967 (c)

Kilkenny

- All-Ireland Senior Hurling Championship: 1967, 1972
- Leinster Senior Hurling Championship: 1967, 1969, 1972, 1973
- Leinster Under-21 Hurling Championship: 1968 (c)
- All-Ireland Vocational Schools Hurling Championship: 1963
