= 1975 All-Ireland Senior Hurling Championship final =

1975 All-Ireland Senior Hurling Final
- Event: 1975 All-Ireland Senior Hurling Championship
Kilkenny	Galway
2-22	2-10
- Date: 7 September 1975
- Venue: Croke Park, Dublin
- Man of the Match: Liam O'Brien
- Referee: Seán O'Connor (Limerick)
- Attendance: 63,711

The 1975 All-Ireland Senior Hurling Championship Final was a hurling match that was played at Croke Park, Dublin on 7 September 1975 to determine the winners of the 1975 All-Ireland Senior Hurling Championship, the 89th season of the All-Ireland Senior Hurling Championship, a tournament organised by the Gaelic Athletic Association for the champion teams of the three hurling provinces of Ireland. The final was contested by Kilkenny of Leinster and Galway of Connacht, with Kilkenny winning by 2-22 to 2-10.

The All-Ireland final between Kilkenny and Galway was the 18th championship meeting between the two teams. Kilkenny were appearing in their fifth successive final and were the reigning champions, while Galway were lining out in their first All-Ireland decider since 1958.

In the first 70-minute All-Ireland final, Galway, who were playing with the aid of the elements into the Canal End, took a 1-3 to 0-3 lead in the 18th minute thanks to a goal by Frank Burke. The exchanges were keen, however, Kilkenny would hit the next six points to carve out a 0-9 to 1-3 interval advantage.

Eddie Keher, after a quiet start, scored Kilkenny's first goal three minutes into the second half. Galway ended their 22-minute scoreless spell in the 40th minute, however, a Pat Delaney point left Kilkenny 1-12 to 1-4 ahead. Galway replied with 1-1 and were only four points behind with 25 minutes left on the clock. Keher's second goal came from a penalty with 20 minutes of play remaining as Kilkenny powered to a 12-point victory.

Kilkenny's All-Ireland victory was their third in four years and their first retention of the title since 1933. The win gave them their 20th All-Ireland title overall.

Galway's All-Ireland defeat was their 8th since last winning the title in 1923.

== Match ==
=== Details ===
7 September 1975

Kilkenny	2-22 – 2-10	Galway
E Keher (2-7), L O'Brien (0-5), M Crotty (0-5), M Brennan (0-2), P Delaney (0-1), P Henderson (0-1), F Cummins (0-1).		G Coone (0-6), F Burke (1-0), PJ Qualter (1-0), PJ Molloy (0-3), J Connolly (0-1).

Croke Park, Dublin
Attendance: 63,711
Referee: Seán O'Connor (Limerick)

Kilkenny	Galway
