= Pat Lally (hurler) =

Irish hurler

Personal information
- Native name: Pádraig Ó Maolalaidh (Irish)
- Born: 17 March 1947 (age 79) Ballinasloe, County Galway, Ireland
- Occupation: Psychiatric nurse
- Height: 6 ft 0 in (183 cm)

Sport
- Sport: Hurling
- Position: Left corner-back
Club
- Years: Club
- St Brigid's
Club titles
- Galway titles: 0
Inter-county
- Years: County
- 1973-: Galway
Inter-county titles
- All-Irelands: 0
- NHL: 1
- All Stars: 0

Patrick Lally (born 17 March 1947) is an Irish former hurler. At club level, he plays with St Brigid's and at inter-county level with the Galway senior hurling team.

== Career ==
At club level, Lally played hurling with the St Brigid's club in Ballinasloe. He was part of the St Brigid's team beaten by Castlegar in the 1973 Galway SHC final replay. Lally was drafted onto the Galway senior hurling team later that year following his performances at club level. He claimed his first senior silverware in 1975 when Galway won the National Hurling League title. Lally was at corner-back for the subsequent 2-22 to 2-10 defeat by Kilkenny in the 1975 All-Ireland final.

== Honours ==
Galway

- National Hurling League: 1974–75
