= P. J. Ryan =

P. J. Ryan may refer to:

- P. J. Ryan (hurler, born 1977), Irish hurler
- P. J. Ryan Sr. (born 1952), his father, Irish hurler
- P. J. Ryan (Tipperary hurler) (born 1946), Irish hurler
- Patrick Joseph Ryan (1904–1969), Australian anti-communist Catholic cleric
