= 1968 All-Ireland Under-21 Hurling Championship final =

1968 All-Ireland Under-21 Hurling Championship Final
- Event: 1968 All-Ireland Under-21 Hurling Championship
Cork	Kilkenny
2-18	3-9
- Date: 8 September 1968
- Venue: Walsh Park, Waterford
- Referee: Séamus Power (Waterford)

The 1968 All-Ireland Under-21 Hurling Championship final was a hurling match that was played at Walsh Park, Waterford on 8 September 1968 to determine the winners of the 1968 All-Ireland Under-21 Hurling Championship, the 5th season of the All-Ireland Under-21 Hurling Championship, a tournament organised by the Gaelic Athletic Association for the champion teams of the four provinces of Ireland. The final was contested by Cork of Munster and Kilkenny of Leinster, with Cork winning by 2-18 to 3-9.

The All-Ireland final between Cork and Kilkenny was their first championship meeting. Cork were hoping to win their second title overall. Kilkenny, appearing in their first final, were hoping to win their first All-Ireland title.

Cork's All-Ireland victory was their second in three years. The victory put them in joint first position with Tipperary on the all-time roll of honour.

Kilkenny's All-Ireland final appearance was their last until 1974.

== Match ==
=== Details ===
8 September 1968

Cork	2-18 – 3-9	Kilkenny
P Meade 1-12, P Cummins 1-2, P Hegarty 0-2, R Lehane 0-1, P Moylan 0-1.		W Harte 1-8, P Lalor 1-0, P Keyes 1-0, J Kinsella 0-1.

Walsh Park
Referee: S Power (Waterford)

Cork
Kilkenny
