= P. J. Delaney (hurler, born 1973) =

Irish hurler

Personal information
- Native name: P. S. Ó Dúláinne (Irish)
- Born: 1973 (age 52–53) Johnstown, County Kilkenny, Ireland
- Occupation: Accountant

Sport
- Sport: Hurling
- Position: Full-forward
Club
- Years: Club
- Fenians
Club titles
- Kilkenny titles: 0
Inter-county*
Years	County	Apps (scores)
1993-1999	Kilkenny	? (6-15)
Inter-county titles
- Leinster titles: 2
- All-Irelands: 1
- NHL: 1
- All Stars: 0
- *Inter County team apps and scores correct as of 22:51, 5 September 2012.

P. J. Delaney (born 1973) is an Irish retired hurler who played as a full-forward for the Kilkenny senior team. He joined the team during the 1993 championship and became a regular member of the starting fifteen.

Delaney won one All-Ireland winners' medal, two Leinster winners' medals and one National League winners' medal. He was an All-Ireland runner-up on two occasions. Delaney's career came to an abrupt end following an attack in September 1999 in which he sustained head injuries including a fractured skull and an injury to his right leg, after the 1999 championship.

At club level Delaney played with Fenians.

Delaney is a member of an extended hurling-playing family. His father, Pat Delaney, won four All-Ireland medals, while his uncles, Billy Fitzpatrick and Shem Delaney, won six All-Ireland medals between them throughout the 1970s and 1980s. His first cousin, J. J. Delaney, was a member of the Kilkenny team and won six All-Ireland medals, while another cousin, also P. J. Delaney, joined the Kilkenny senior team in 2006.
