= 1973 Kilkenny Intermediate Hurling Championship =

- Dates: 6 May - 11 November 1973
- Teams: 8
- Champions: Coon (1st title)
- Runners-up: Graignamanagh

The 1973 Kilkenny Intermediate Hurling Championship was the ninth staging of the Kilkenny Intermediate Hurling Championship since its establishment by the Kilkenny County Board. The draw for the opening round fixtures took place on 9 April 1973. The championship began on 6 May 1973 and ended on 11 November 1973.

The final was played on 11 November 1973 at Nowlan Park in Kilkenny, between Coon and Graignamanagh, in what was their first meeting in a final. Coon won the match by 4-08 to 3-06 to claim their first championship title.

== Team summaries ==
Group	Team
Group A	Coon
Group A	Graignamanagh
Group A	John Locke's
Group A	St Senan's
Group B	Emeralds
Group B	Lisdowney
Group B	Newpark Sarsfields
Group B	Paulstown

== Results ==
=== Semi-finals ===
19 August 1973 Semi-final	Graignamanagh	1-13 - 2-06	Paulstown	Nowlan Park

14 October 1973 Semi-final	Coon	7-07 - 3-06	Lisdowney	Nowlan Park

=== Final ===
11 November 1973 Final	Coon	4-08 - 3-06	Graignamanagh	Nowlan Park
