= P. J. Ryan (hurler, born 1977) =

Irish hurler

Personal information
- Native name: P. S. Ó Riain (Irish)
- Born: 15 June 1977 (age 49) Johnstown, County Kilkenny, Ireland
- Height: 5 ft 9 in (175 cm)

Sport
- Sport: Hurling
- Position: Goalkeeper
Club
- Years: Club
- Fenians
Club titles
- Kilkenny titles: 0
Inter-county*
Years	County	Apps (scores)
1999–2012	Kilkenny	18 (0-00)
Inter-county titles
- Leinster titles: 10
- All-Irelands: 7
- NHL: 5
- All Stars: 1
- *Inter County team apps and scores correct as of 13:45, 22 January 2012.

Patrick Joseph "P. J." Ryan (born 15 June 1977) is an Irish hurler who played as a goalkeeper for the Kilkenny senior team.

Born in Johnstown, County Kilkenny, Ryan first played competitive hurling during his schooling at Thurles CBS. He arrived on the inter-county scene at the age of seventeen when he first linked up with the Kilkenny minor team, before later joining the under-21 side. He joined the senior panel during the 1999 championship. Ryan later became a regular member of the starting fifteen, and won three All-Ireland medals, four Leinster medals and two National League medals on the field of play. He was an All-Ireland runner-up on one occasion.

As a member of the Leinster inter-provincial team on a number of occasions, Ryan won two Railway Cup medals. At club level Ryan continues to play with Fenians.

Ryan's father, P. J. Ryan Sr., won three All-Ireland medals as reserve goalkeeper to Noel Skehan between 1974 and 1979.

Throughout his career Ryan made 18 championship appearances. He announced his retirement from inter-county hurling on 18 January 2012.

== Playing career ==
=== Club ===
Ryan plays his club hurling with the Fenians club in Johnstown and enjoyed much success during his underage career. In 1995 he won a championship medal in the minor "B" grade following a narrow 1–14 to 1–13 defeat of John Locke's.

Two years later in 1997 Ryan was a key member of the club's under-21 team. He won a championship medal in the "B" grade once again, following a 1–11 to 1–2 trouncing of Piltown.

=== Minor and under-21 ===
Ryan first played for Kilkenny in 1995 when he joined the minor side. He won his first Leinster medal that year following a 4–16 to 2–6 defeat of Offaly. The subsequent All-Ireland decider pitted Kilkenny against old rivals Cork, with Ryan lining out in goal. The game turned into a rout as Cork won easily by 2–10 to 1–2.

In 1998 Ryan was a key member of the Kilkenny under-21 team. A 2–10 to 0–12 defeat of Dublin in the provincial decider gave him his sole Leinster medal in that grade.

=== Senior ===
==== Beginnings ====
In 1999 Ryan first linked up with the Kilkenny senior team. In the week leading up to the All-Ireland final with Cork, reserve goalkeeper Martin Carey broke his finger and had to withdraw. Ryan was quickly drafted onto the panel, however, he remained on the bench for Cork's narrow 0–13 to 0–12 victory.

==== Reserve goalkeeper ====
Ryan was off and on the panel over the next few years and remained as third-choice goalkeeper, before taking over as second to James McGarry in 2002. That year he was an unused substitute as Kilkenny made a clean sweep by claiming the National League, Leinster and All-Ireland titles.

In 2003 Ryan won his first league medal on the field of play as Kilkenny came back from eight points down to secure a stunning 5–14 to 5–13 extra-time defeat of Tipperary. On 7 June 2003 Ryan made his senior championship debut in a 3–16 to 0–10 Leinster semi-final defeat of Dublin. He was dropped to the substitutes' bench for all subsequent games, as Kilkenny went on to retain the Leinster and All-Ireland crowns.

Ryan remained as an unused substitute over the next three years, but collected another two league medals, two Leinster medals and an All-Ireland medal.

==== First-choice goalkeeper ====
In 2007 Ryan took over as Kilkenny's first-choice goalkeeper. That year he won his first Leinster medal on the field of play as Kilkenny asserted their provincial dominance and defeated Wexford by 2–24 to 1–12. On 2 September 2007 Kilkenny faced defeated Munster finalists and surprise All-Ireland semi-final winners Limerick in the championship decider. Kilkenny got off to a flying start with Eddie Brennan and Henry Shefflin scoring two goals within the first ten minutes to set the tone. Limerick launched a second-half comeback, however, "the Cats" were too powerful and cruised to a 2–19 to 1–15 victory. It was Ryan's first All-Ireland medal on the field of play.

Kilkenny secured the Leinster crown again in 2008, with Ryan collecting a second successive winners' medal following a 5–21 to 0–17 drubbing of Wexford. On 8 September 2008 Kilkenny faced Waterford in the All-Ireland decider for the first time in forty-five years. In a disappointingly one-sided final, Kilkenny produced a near perfect seventy minutes as Waterford endured a nightmare afternoon. A 23-point winning margin, 3–24 from play, only two wides in the entire match and eight scorers in all with Eddie Brennan and Henry Shefflin leading the way in a 3–30 to 1–13 victory. It was Ryan's second All-Ireland medal.

Ryan collected a second league medal on the field in 2009, as Kilkenny beat Tipperary by 2–26 to 4–17 with a thrilling extra-time victory. He later won a third successive Leinster medal as new challengers Dublin were bested by 2–18 to 0–18. On 6 September Kilkenny were poised to become the second team ever in the history of hurling to win four successive All-Ireland championships when they faced Tipperary in the decider. For long periods Tipp looked the likely winners, however, late goals from Henry Shefflin and substitute Martin Comerford, together with a series of magnificent saves from Ryan, finally killed off their efforts to secure a 2–22 to 0–23 victory. Ryan had collected his third All-Ireland medal while he was also named man of the match. He later collected an All-Star.

==== Decline ====
In 2010 Kilkenny defeated Galway in an eagerly-anticipated but ultimately disappointing provincial decider. A 1–19 to 1–12 victory gave Ryan a fourth consecutive Leinster medal. The drive for a fifth successive All-Ireland crown reached a head on 5 September 2010, when Kilkenny faced Tipperary in the All-Ireland decider. "The Cats" lost talisman Henry Shefflin early in the first half due to injury, while Tipperary's Lar Corbett ran riot and scored a hat-trick of goals as Ryan's side fell to a 4–17 to 1–18 defeat.

Ryan was dropped from the starting fifteen in 2011, however, he collected further Leinster and All-Ireland medals as a non-playing substitute as Kilkenny dominated the championship once again.

=== Inter-provincial ===
In 2006 Walsh was goalkeeper on the Leinster team that faced Munster in the inter-provincial final. Richie Power top-scored with nine points as Leinster secured a 1–15 to 1–12 victory. It was Ryan's first Railway Cup medal.

Leinster made it two-in-a-row in 2009, with Ryan collecting his second winner's medal as Leinster defeated Connacht by 3–18 to 1–17.

== Honours ==
=== Player ===
Fenians

- Kilkenny Under-21 B Hurling Championship (1): 1997
- Kilkenny Minor B Hurling Championship (1): 1995

Kilkenny

- All-Ireland Senior Hurling Championship (7): 2002, 2003, 2006, 2007, 2008, 2009, 2011
- Leinster Senior Hurling Championship (10): 1999, 2002, 2003, 2005, 2006, 2007, 2008, 2009, 2010, 2011
- National Hurling League (5): 2002, 2003, 2005, 2006, 2009
- Leinster Under-21 Hurling Championship (1): 1998
- Leinster Minor Hurling Championship (1): 1995

Leinster

- Railway Cup (2): 2008, 2009

Awards

- All Stars (1): 2009
- All-Ireland Hurling Final Man of the Match (1): 2009

Awards
Preceded by Brian Cody (Kilkenny)	All-Ireland Senior Hurling Final; Man of the Match; 2009	Succeeded by Lar Corbett (Tipperary)
