= PJS =

PJS, PJs, or PJ's may refer to:

== Schools ==
- Pusan Japanese School, now Busan Japanese School
- Portland Japanese School

== Other uses ==
- Air Force Pararescue (the para jumpers) of the US Air Force
- Peutz–Jeghers syndrome, a genetic disease
- PJs, nickname for pajamas, a form of clothing
- P.J.'s, later the Starwood, a nightclub in West Hollywood, California, US
- The PJs, a clay animated television series
  - The PJs (soundtrack), a soundtrack album from the TV series
- PJ Trailers, a US company

== See also ==
- PJS v News Group Newspapers Ltd, a British court case

== See also ==
- PJ (disambiguation)
