= John Hely =

English-born judge in Ireland

Sir John Hely (born c. 1650 – died 7 April 1701) was an English-born judge in Ireland, who held office as Chief Baron of the Irish Exchequer, and who was the founder of the prominent landowning Hely family of Foulkscourt Castle, Johnstown, County Kilkenny. The family is chiefly remembered for developing the village of Johnstown.

He was born in London, the eldest son of James Hely. He entered Lincoln's Inn in 1670 and was called to the Bar in 1679.

== Marriage ==
In 1685 he made a seemingly advantageous marriage to Meliora Gorges, younger daughter of the merchant Ferdinando Gorges of Eye Manor, Hertfordshire, and his wife Meliora Hilliard. Gorges had supposedly made a fortune in Barbados, although there were many who claimed that he was simply a financial schemer (in modern parlance, a confidence trickster) whose fortune was largely imaginary, and he was already in serious financial difficulties by 1685. Hely and Meliora had at least five children: their eldest son, George, was the founder of the Hely family of Foulkscourt House, Johnstown, County Kilkenny. They had at least three other sons, William, John and James: James was still a minor in 1717 when the brothers were involved in a lawsuit against their uncle Henry Gorges.

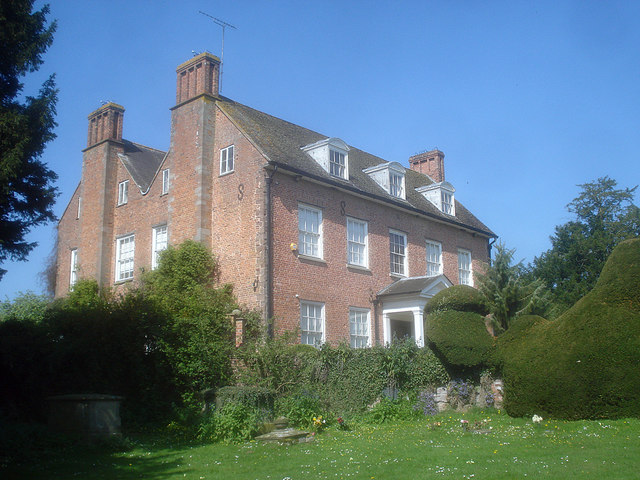
Eye Manor, which was built by Hely's father-in-law, Ferdinando Gorges.

=== The Coningsby connection ===
Meliora's elder sister Barbara had married the rising young statesman Thomas Coningsby, 1st Earl Coningsby in 1675. Barbara's marriage to Thomas was notoriously unhappy, partly due to her father's ill-advised financial schemes which involved Thomas in disastrous losses, and ended in divorce. Nonetheless, Hely's rise to high office was almost certainly due to the Coningsby connection: Coningsby's biographer suggests that Hely was sent to Ireland to strengthen Coningsby's power base in Dublin.

== Judicial career ==
He was appointed Chief Baron of the Irish Exchequer in 1690 on the recommendation of Coningsby, who had been appointed one of the Lord Justices (Ireland), which gave him a considerable degree of control over the Irish administration. Hely arrived in Ireland the following year, joined the King's Inns and was knighted in 1692. He held the office of Commissioner of Revenue Appeals at the same time.

He lived at Stephen Street in Dublin city and had a country house at Ballygall near Finglas in west County Dublin. Either Sir John or his eldest son George Hely of Foulkscourt House, began laying out the village of Johnstown in County Kilkenny. It is his son John, though, who Johnstown is named after. The location of the centre of Johnstown was formerly known as Hely's Cross or Healy's Cross. John obtained a grant of the old Purcell estate at Foulkscourt in 1697. He was a member of the Dublin Philosophical Society.

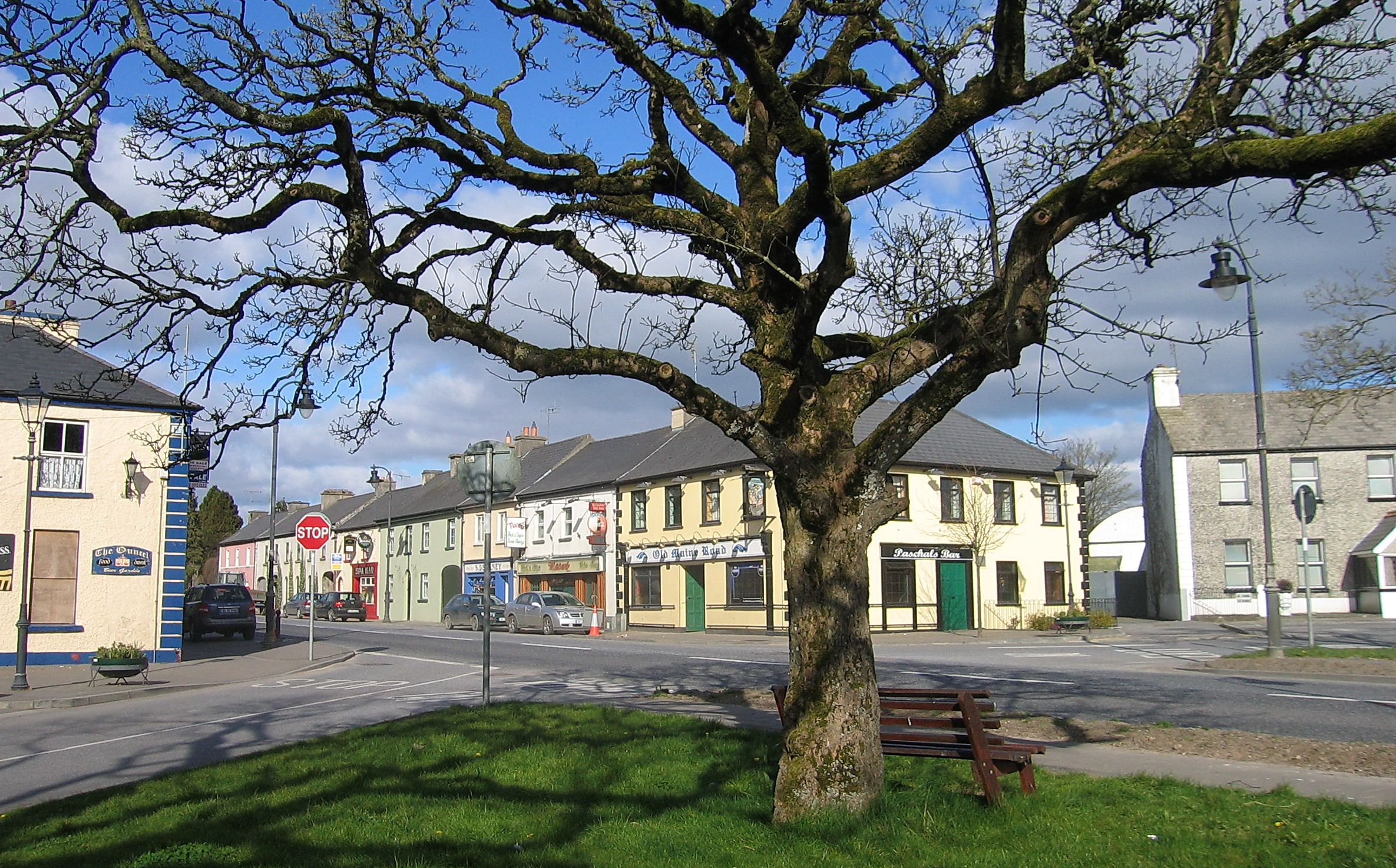
Johnstown, County Kilkenny, which was developed by the Hely family.

In 1695 Hely became Chief Justice of the Irish Common Pleas. He acted as Speaker of the Irish House of Lords in 1696–7.

== Death ==
Within a few years, despite his relative youth, his health failed. In 1701, although he felt well enough to travel on the spring assizes, he fell ill at Ennis and died "after two days sickness" at the house of Mr David England, who was later paid £3 by the Crown for caring for him. Burke suggests that Hely, like many judges of the time, found that the strain of going on assize (in particular enduring the ordeal of the notoriously bad Irish roads) was too much for his constitution to bear.

About 1698 the Irish-born writer and publisher John Dunton, on a visit to Dublin, gave a sketch of the Irish judiciary and praised most of them, including Hely, as "men of such reputation that no one complains of them". On the other hand, Ball cynically notes that the general reaction to the news of his sudden death was not so much grief as widespread interest in who would be appointed to fill his place.

His widow remarried James de Lestrille: they were named as co-defendants in her sons' lawsuit against her brother Henry in 1717.

Legal offices
Preceded by Richard Pyne	Chief Justice of the Irish Common Pleas; 1695–1701	Succeeded by Sir Richard Cox, 1st Baronet
