= Mick Lawler =

Irish hurler (1942–2022)

Personal information
- Native name: Mícheál Ó Leathlobhair (Irish)
- Born: 16 October 1942 Coon, County Kilkenny, Ireland
- Died: 8 November 2022 (aged 80) Kilkenny, Ireland
- Occupation: Oil distributor

Sport
- Sport: Hurling
- Position: Midfield
Clubs
- Years: Club
- Coon; Carnew Emmets; Conahy Shamrocks
Club titles
- Wicklow titles: 3
Inter-county
- Years: County
- 1969-1971: Kilkenny
Inter-county titles
- Leinster titles: 2
- All-Irelands: 1

Michael Lawler (16 October 1942 – 8 November 2022) was an Irish hurler. At club level he played with Coon, Carnew Emmets and Conahy Shamrocks, and also lined out at inter-county level with Kilkenny and Wicklow.

== Career ==
Lawler first played hurling alongside his four brothers at club level with Coon. He was part of the team that beat Knocktoper to win the Kilkenny JHC title in 1967 and gain senior status. Lawler's performances at club level resulted in him joining the Kilkenny senior hurling team. He was at midfield when Kilkenny beat Cork in the 1969 All-Ireland final. Lawler was a non-playing substitute when Kilkenny suffered defeat by Tipperary in the 1971 All-Ireland final.

A move to Wicklow shortly after resulted in him joining the Carnew Emmets club. He won several Wicklow SHC medals with his adopted club, however, he also lined out illegally with Coon on a number of occasions and earned a suspension for this. Lawler also earned selection to the Wicklow senior hurling team.

Lawler later returned to his native county and, after settling in Jenkinstown, joined the Conahy Shamrocks club. He won a Kilkenny JBHC medal in 1984 and was also named club Player of the Year at the age of 42.

== Personal life and death ==
Lawler, the youngest of then children, was born in Coon, County Kilkenny in October 1942. He married Margaret Scully from Kinnitty, County Offaly in 1970. The couple later settled in Tinahely, County Wicklow where Lawler worked in the Avoca Mines. He later worked as an oil distributor after returning to Kilkenny.

Lawler died on 8 November 2022, at the age of 80.

== Honours ==
Coon

- Kilkenny Junior Hurling Championship: 1967

Carnew Emmets

- Wicklow Senior Hurling Championship: 1973, 1974, 1976

Conahy Shamrocks

- Kilkenny Junior B Hurling Championship: 1984

Kilkenny

- All-Ireland Senior Hurling Championship: 1969
- Leinster Senior Hurling Championship: 1969, 1971
