= Seán O'Connor (sports administrator) =

Irish hurler, selector, referee and Gaelic games administrator

Personal information
- Native name: Seán Ó Conchubhair (Irish)
- Born: 1935 Limerick, Ireland
- Died: 5 February 2018 (aged 82) Limerick, Ireland
- Occupation: Aircraft mechanic

Sport
- Sport: Hurling
Club
- Years: Club
- Claughaun
Club titles
	Football	Hurling
Limerick titles	3	4
Inter-county
- Years: County
- 1957–1959: Limerick
Inter-county titles
- Munster titles: 0
- All-Irelands: 0
- NHL: 0

Seán O'Connor (1935 – 5 February 2018) was an Irish hurler, selector, referee and Gaelic games administrator. His league and championship career at senior level with the Limerick county team lasted two seasons from 1957 until 1959.

Born in Limerick, O'Connor first played competitive hurling and Gaelic football at juvenile and underage levels with the Claughaun club. He eventually became a dual player with the club's senior teams, winning four county hurling championship medals and three county football championship medals.

O'Connor made his inter-county debut as a dual player with the Limerick minor teams. He joined the senior hurling team in 1957 and had two seasons as a member of the team.

Following his inter-county career, O'Connor served as an administrator and referee at club and county levels. He refereed the All-Ireland Senior Hurling Championship finals in 1969 and 1975, a number of Oireachtas Cup finals and 22 Munster finals at varying levels in both codes. O'Connor held most administration positions with the Claughaun club, including chairman and president, while he also served as assistant treasurer of the Limerick City Divisional Board.

== Honours ==
Claughaun

- Limerick Senior Hurling Championship (4): 1957, 1958, 1968, 1971
- Limerick Senior Football Championship (3): 1955, 1959, 1967

Achievements
Preceded by John Dowling	All-Ireland SHC Final referee 1969	Succeeded by Jimmy Hatton
Preceded by John Moloney	All-Ireland MHC Final referee 1973	Succeeded by Mick Spain
Preceded by John Moloney	All-Ireland SHC Final referee 1975	Succeeded by Paddy Johnston
