= 1975 All-Ireland Senior Club Hurling Championship final =

1975 All-Ireland Senior Club Hurling Championship Final
- Event: 1974–75 All-Ireland Senior Club Hurling Championship
St Finbarr's	Fenians
3-8	1-6
- Date: 16 March 1975
- Venue: Croke Park, Dublin
- Referee: Mick Spain (Offaly)

The 1975 All-Ireland Senior Club Hurling Championship final was a hurling match played at Croke Park on 16 March 1975 to determine the winners of the 1974–75 All-Ireland Senior Club Hurling Championship, the fifth season of the All-Ireland Senior Club Hurling Championship, a tournament organised by the Gaelic Athletic Association for the champion clubs of the four provinces of Ireland. The final was contested by St Finbarr's of Cork and Fenians of Kilkenny, with St Finbarr's winning by 3-8 to 1-6.

The All-Ireland final between St Finbarr's and Fenians was a unique occasion as it was the first ever championship meeting between the two teams. It remains their only championship meeting. Both sides were appearing in their first All-Ireland final.

The game was evenly contested, however, goals in the last quarter were vital for St Finbarr's. Jimmy Barry-Murphy, Jerry O'Shea and Charlie Cullinane all found the net as St Finbarr's claimed an eight-point victory.

The All-Ireland victory for St Finbarr's was the first of their two championship titles. They were the third Cork representatives to win the All-Ireland title.

== Match ==
=== Details ===
16 March 1975

St Finbarr's	3-8 - 1-6	Fenians
J Barry-Murphy 1-4, J O'Shea 1-0, C Cullinane 1-0, C Roche 0-2 (1f), C McCarthy 0-1 (1f), É Fitzpatrick 0-1.		P Delaney 1-0, B Fitzpatrick 0-2, M Garrett 0-1, J Ryan 0-1, J Moriarty 0-1, P Henderson 0-1 (1f).

Croke Park, Dublin
Attendance: 3,000
Referee: M Spain (Offaly)

St Finbarr's	Fenians
