= 1971 Kilkenny Senior Hurling Championship =

Annual hurling competition season

- Dates: 30 May 1971 - 14 November 1971
- Champions: Bennettsbridge (12th title)
- Runners-up: Fenians

Tournament statistics
- Matches played: 25

The 1971 Kilkenny Senior Hurling Championship was the 77th staging of the Kilkenny Senior Hurling Championship since its establishment by the Kilkenny County Board.

Fenians were the defending champions.

On 14 November 1971, Bennettsbridge won the championship after a 3–10 to 1–07 defeat of Fenians in the final. It was their 12th championship title overall and their first in three championship seasons. It remains their last championship triumph.

== Team changes ==
=== To Championship ===
Promoted from the Kilkenny Junior Hurling Championship

- Windgap

== Results ==
=== First round ===
| 30 May 1971 First round | Mooncoin | 1-12 - 2-04 | Thomastown | Piltown Sportsfield |

| 6 June 1971 First round | Fenians | 7-09 - 2-09 | St. Lachtain's | St. Patrick's Park |

| 6 June 1971 First round | Clara | 4-02 - 4-20 | Erin's Own | Nowlan Park |

| 13 June 1971 First round | Rower-Inistioge | 3-14 - 3-07 | Lisdowney | Nowlan Park |

| 20 June 1971 First round | Galmoy | 4-21 - 7-07 | Young Irelands | Nowlan Park |

| 27 June 1971 First round | Bennettsbridge | 3-11 - 2-06 | James Stephens | Nowlan Park |

| 27 June 1971 First round | Coon | 3-09 - 2-12 | St. Senan's | Nowlan Park |

| First round replay | Coon | v | St. Senan's | Nowlan Park |

- Windgap received a bye in this round.

=== Winners' group ===
==== First round ====
| 25 July 1971 First round | Galmoy | 1-09 - 2-18 | Bennettsbridge | Nowlan Park |

| 1 August 1971 First round | Erin's Own | 2-13 - 0-08 | Mooncoin | Nowlan Park |

| 1 August 1971 First round | Windgap | 3-14 - 5-08 | St. Senan's | Piltown Sportsfield |

| 8 August 1971 First round | Fenians | 5-11 - 1-08 | Rower-Inistioge | Nowlan Park |

| 8 August 1971 First round replay | Windgap | 1-14 - 2-11 | St. Senan's | Piltown Sportsfield |

| 12 September 1971 First round second replay | Windgap | 1-11 - 2-04 | St. Senan's | Piltown Sportsfield |

==== Second round ====
| 12 September 1971 Second round | Fenians | 2-13 - 4-06 | Erin's Own | Nowlan Park |

| 3 October 1971 Second round | Bennettsbridge | 7-03 - 4-10 | Windgap | Thomastown Sportsfield |

=== Losers' group ===
==== First round ====
| 1 August 1971 First round | St. Lachtain's | 2-06 - 2-10 | James Stephens | Nowlan Park |

| 1 August 1971 First round | Clara | 3-04 - 5-11 | Coon | Nowlan Park |

| 8 August 1971 First round | Thomastown | 3-06 - 3-11 | Young Irelands | Nowlan Park |

- Lisdowney received a bye in this round.

==== Second round ====
| 12 September 1971 Second round | Coon | 2-13 - 3-10 | Young Irelands | Nowlan Park |

| 26 September 1971 Second round | James Stephens | 5-08 - 3-02 | Lisdowney | Nowlan Park |

| 3 October 1971 Second round replay | Coon | 2-07 - 5-07 | Young Irelands | Nowlan Park |

=== Semi-finals ===
| 31 October 1971 Semi-final | Bennettsbridge | 3-12 - 3-06 | Young Irelands | Nowlan Park |
| | | | | Referee: J Murphy (Tullogher) |

| 31 October 1971 Semi-final | Fenians | 3-15 - 2-06 | James Stephens | Nowlan Park |

=== Final ===
| 14 November 1971 Final | Bennettsbridge | 3-10 - 1-07 | Fenians | Nowlan Park |
| | K Dunne 2-1, P Moran 1-1, J Kinsella 0-4, C Hayes 0-2, P Treacy 0-2. | | B Watson 1-0, P Delaney 0-3, J Moriarty 0-2, D Walsh 0-1, P Broderick 0-1. |
