= Jim O'Brien (Limerick hurler) =

Irish hurler

Personal information
- Native name: Séamus Ó Briain (Irish)
- Born: 1945 Bruree, County Limerick, Ireland
- Died: 19 August 2020 (aged 74–75) Bruree, County Limerick, Ireland
- Occupation: Farmer
- Height: 6 ft 0 in (183 cm)

Sport
- Sport: Hurling
- Position: Left corner-back
Club
- Years: Club
- Bruree
Club titles
- Limerick titles: 0
Inter-county*
| Years | County | Apps (scores) |
| 1966–1979 | Limerick | 24 (0–00) |
Inter-county titles
- Munster titles: 2
- All-Irelands: 1
- NHL: 1
- All Stars: 1
- *Inter County team apps and scores correct as of 14:02, 26 December 2018.

James O'Brien (1945 – 19 August 2020) was an Irish hurler. At club level he played as a centre-back for Bruree and was the left corner-back on the Limerick senior hurling team that won the 1973 All-Ireland Championship.

O'Brien's skill was recognised at an early age when he won a South Limerick school's medal with Bruree National School, before an unrewarding spell at Rathluirc CBS. His career at club level with Bruree spanned three decades.

O'Brien won a Munster Championship medal with the Limerick minor hurling team in 1963, before being subsequently selected for the Limerick under-21 and junior teams. He made his first appearance for the Limerick senior hurling team during the 1966-67 National League and enjoyed his greatest successes as a defender over the following decade. In 1973 O'Brien became the first Bruree clubman to win an All-Ireland Championship medal, having earlier won Munster Championship and National Hurling League titles.

== Honours ==
Limerick

- All-Ireland Senior Hurling Championship (1): 1973
- Munster Senior Hurling Championship (2): 1973, 1974
- National Hurling League (1): 1970-71
- Munster Minor Hurling Championship (1): 1963

Munster

- Railway Cup (1): 1970

Awards

- All-Star Award (1): 1973
