= P. J. Delaney =

P. J. Delaney may refer to:

- P. J. Delaney (2000s hurler) (born 1984), Irish hurler for the Kilkenny senior team
- P. J. Delaney (1990s hurler) (born 1973), Irish hurler for the Kilkenny senior team
