= PJ =

PJ may refer to:

== Arts and entertainment ==
- P.J. (film), a 1968 film starring George Peppard
- P.J. (comics), a character in The Family Circus comic strip
- P.J. (Disney), Pete Junior, a Disney cartoon character
- PJ (singer), singer and songwriter
- "PJ" (song), by BossMan Dlow featuring Lil Baby, 2024
- P.J. (TV series) (Police judiciaire) a French TV series starring Bruno Wolkowitch (1997–2009)

== Businesses ==
- Peach John, a Japanese lingerie retailer with "pj" logo
- PJ Media, originally known as Pajamas Media
- PJ Trailers, an American trailer manufacturer

== Organisations ==
- PJ, Police Judiciaire, a higher branch of the French police services
- PJ, Justicialist Party, (Partido Justicialista), a major Argentine political party
- PJ, Polícia Judiciária, Portuguese criminal investigation police

== People ==
- P. J. (given name), including a list of people with that name

== Places ==
- Massie Wireless Station, Rhode Island, U.S.
- Petaling Jaya, a Malaysian city
- Port Jervis, New York, U.S.
- Port Jefferson, New York, a village on Long Island, New York in the United States

== Other uses ==
- PJ, IATA code for Air Saint-Pierre
- PJ, personal jurisdiction, a court's jurisdiction over the parties to a lawsuit
- PJ, petajoule, a unit of energy
- pJ, picojoule, a unit of energy
- PJ, code for United States Air Force Pararescue
- The PJ, The Pharmaceutical Journal

== See also ==
- PJS (disambiguation)
- JP (disambiguation)
