= P. J. King =

Irish political activist

P. J. King was an Irish political activist.

King apparently spent time in Belgium before arriving in Liverpool in 1873. Around this time, he may have been connected with the International Workingmen's Association, which had established a branch of Irish workers in the city. At the time, the international was supporting Liverpool trade unionists against attempts to import strikebreakers from Belgium.

King was active in the Irish nationalist movement, and also as a trade unionist. From 1889, he was the leader of the Lancashire Chemical and Copper Workers' Union, in one year increasing its membership from three to 11,000. While the union initially proved successful at increasing wages, company owners formed a syndicate in opposition to the union, which ultimately collapsed.

During the coal miners strike of 1892, King organised relief work, with the support of the Mayor of Liverpool. He thereafter began lecturing on the desirability of a trades federation, and relocated to London, where he wrote weekly for The Clarion. Robert Blatchford approved of King's federation proposal; he co-authored a pamphlet on the topic with King, and serialised King's ideas in The Clarion under his own pseudonym. The Clarion sponsored the foundation of the "NIGFLTU", a democratic trades federation, but the Trades Union Congress backed a rival proposal, forming the General Federation of Trade Unions, and King's scheme proved unsuccessful.
