= P. J. Narayanan =

Indian computer scientist and academic

P. J. Narayanan (born 1963 in Alwaye, Kerala) is an Indian academic who is a professor at the International Institute of Information Technology, Hyderabad, and the former director of institute from April 2013 to August 2025. He is known for his work in computer vision (3D reconstruction, structure-from-motion, computational displays), computer graphics (ray-tracing of implicit surfaces, dynamic scenes), and parallel computing on the GPU (graph algorithms, string sorting, ML techniques like graph cuts, ANN and clustering, as well as several computer vision tasks).

== Early life ==
Narayanan obtained his B.Tech. degree in computer science and engineering from Indian Institute of Technology, Kharagpur, in 1984. Narayanan graduated with a master's degree from University of Maryland, College Park, US, in 1989 and obtained his Ph.D. in computer science from University of Maryland, College Park, US, in 1991 where he worked with Prof. Larry Davis.

== Career ==
Narayanan started his career in the Lipi group of the R&D group of CMC Ltd and helped design the second generation hardware for their Indian language word processor. He moved to University of Maryland for graduate studies in 1986. He worked as a research faculty member at the Robotics Institute of Carnegie Mellon University from 1992 till 1996. He was instrumental in building the virtualized reality system that for the first time captured dynamic events in 3D from multiple points of view. The events so captured could be integrated into a virtual reality environment for visualization and manipulation.

He joined the Centre for Artificial Intelligence and Robotics (CAIR), a DRDO lab, in 1996. He headed the Computer Vision and Virtual Reality groups of CAIR and was instrumental in initiating several VR applications for DRDO and the defence. He moved to IIIT Hyderabad in 2000 and established the Centre for Visual Information Technology (CVIT), which has grown into the largest research group in India in the areas of computer vision, graphics, and medical image processing.

Prof. Narayanan has played crucial roles in several editions of the Indian Conference on Computer Vision, Graphics, and Image Processing (ICVGIP). He was also instrumental in bringing the Asian Conference on Computer Vision (ACCV) to Hyderabad in 2006. He has been an Area Chair for ICCV, CVPR, ACCV, IJCAI, etc.

He was appointed the Co-Chair of the ACM India Council when it was formed. He became the first President of ACM India in 2012 and Chaired the ACM India Research Board from 2014. He has played several roles in the Association for Computing Machinery including being in the Nominations Committee and the committee to decide on the Outstanding Contributions to ACM award.

== Awards and recognitions ==
- Fellow of the Indian National Academy of Engineering (INAE) in 2016
- CUDA Fellow in recognition of contributions to GPGPU by Nvidia Corporation in 2008
- Association for Computing Machinery (ACM) Presidential Award, 2013
- Best paper. ACM Indian Conference on Computer Vision, Graphics & Image Processing (ICVGIP). 2022
- Best paper. ACM SIGGRAPH Symposium on Interactive 3D Graphics and Games (I3D). 2022
- Best Industry Paper Honourable Mention Award in the British Machine Vision Conference (BMVC), 2018
- Best GPU paper in the High Performance Computing (HiPC), 2013
- Best paper in Eurographics Symposium on Parallel Graphics and Visualization (EGPGV), 2010
- Best applications paper International Conference on Multisensor Fusion and Integration (MFI), 1996
