= 1977 Kilkenny Senior Hurling Championship =

Annual hurling competition season

- Teams: 12
- Champions: Fenians (5th title); Mick Garrett (captain)
- Runners-up: Rower-Inistioge; Eddie Keher (captain)

The 1977 Kilkenny Senior Hurling Championship was the 83rd staging of the Kilkenny Senior Hurling Championship since its establishment by the Kilkenny County Board in 1887.

James Stephens were the defending champions, however, they were beaten by Fenians in the semi-finals.

The final was played on 6 November 1977 at Nowlan Park in Kilkenny, between Fenians and Rower-Inistioge, in what was their first ever meeting in the final. Fenians won the match by 3–11 to 1–10 to claim their fifth championship title overall and a first title in three years.

== Results ==
=== Semi-finals ===
18 September 1977 Semi-final	Fenians	4-10 - 0-10	James Stephens	Nowlan Park
	B Watson 1-2, B Fitzpatrick 0-5, J Moriarty 1-0, J Ryan 1-0, P Fitzpatrick 1-0, P Delaney 0-2, J Power 0-1.		L O'Brien 0-6, M Crotty 0-2, B Cody 0-1, J McCormack 0-1.

18 September 1977 Semi-final	Rower–Inistioge	3-12 - 4-09	Muckalee/Ballyfoyle Rangers	Nowlan Park
	E Keher 0-5, T Waters 1-1, T Malone 1-0, S Lester 1-0, P Grace 0-3, M Lyng 0-1, P Walsh 0-1, G Murphy 0-1.		B Morrissey 1-4, D Nolan 2-0, J Brennan 1-0, M Coonan 0-2, T Moran 0-2, J Moran 0-1.

2 October 1977 Semi-final replay	Rower–Inistioge	4-06 - 3-09	Muckalee/Ballyfoyle Rangers	Nowlan Park
	N Cottrell 2-1, G Murphy 1-1, E Keher 1-1, P Grace 0-2, P Tierney 0-1.		T Moran 2-1, B Morrissey 0-6, D Nolan 1-0, J Moran 0-1, J Nolan 0-1.

23 October 1977 Semi-final second replay	Rower–Inistioge	2-05 - 1-07	Muckalee/Ballyfoyle Rangers	Nowlan Park
	E Keher 1-4, T Watters 1-0, S Lester 0-1.		D Nolan 1-0, B Morrissey 0-3, J Nolan 0-2, T Moran 0-1, P Comerford 0-1.

=== Final ===
6 November 1977 Final	Fenians	3-11 - 1-10	Rower–Inistioge	Nowlan Park
	B Fitzpatrick 0-8, P Delaney 1-1, J Ryan 1-0, J Power 1-0, J Moriarty 0-2.		E Keher 1-5, P Grace 0-1, M Lyng 0-1, S Lister 0-1, T Malone 0-1, G Murphy 0-1.
