= Michael O'Connor (hurler) =

Irish hurler

Personal information
- Native name: Mícheál Ó Conchúir (Irish)
- Born: 1930 (age 95–96) Cappoquin, County Waterford, Ireland
- Occupation: Businessman
- Height: 5 ft 9 in (175 cm)

Sport
- Sport: Hurling
- Position: Right wing-back
Club
- Years: Club
- Cappoquin
Club titles
- Waterford titles: 0
Inter-county
- Years: County
- Waterford
Inter-county titles
- Munster titles: 2
- All-Irelands: 1
- NHL: 0

Michael O'Connor (born 1930) is an Irish retired hurler who played as a right wing-back for club side Cappoquin and at inter-county level with the Waterford senior hurling team.

== Honours ==
Ballygunner

- Waterford Junior Hurling Championship (1): 1948

Waterford

- All-Ireland Senior Hurling Championship (1): 1959
- Munster Senior Hurling Championship (2): 1957, 1959
- All-Ireland Minor Hurling Championship (1): 1948
- Munster Minor Hurling Championship (1): 1948
