= Billy Fitzpatrick =

Irish former sportsperson

Personal information
- Native name: Liam Mac Giolla Phádraig (Irish)
- Nickname: Fitz
- Born: April 6, 1954 (age 72) Johnstown, County Kilkenny
- Occupation: Publican
- Height: 5 ft 11 in (180 cm)

Sport
- Sport: Hurling
- Position: Half-forward
Club
- Years: Club
- 1972-1993: Fenians
Club titles
- Kilkenny titles: 4
- Leinster titles: 1
- All-Ireland Titles: 0
Inter-county
Years	County	Apps (scores)
2010-present	Kilkenny	34 (1-10)
Inter-county titles
- Leinster titles: 6
- All-Irelands: 5
- All Stars: 2

Billy Fitzpatrick (born 6 April 1954 in Johnstown, County Kilkenny, Ireland) is an Irish former sportsperson. He played hurling with his local club the Fenians and was a member of the Kilkenny senior inter-county team from 1974 until 1986. Fitzpatrick captained Kilkenny to the All-Ireland title in 1975.

== Early life ==
Fitzpatrick was born in Johnstown, County Kilkenny in 1954. From an early age he showed great skill at the game of hurling. He was educated locally and later attended St Kieran's College in Kilkenny City, a secondary school and noted nursery for young hurling talent. It was here that his hurling skills were further developed. Fitzpatrick first tasted success when he won an All-Ireland Colleges’ title with Kieran’s in 1971. He was captain of the side the following year when the college lost to Farranferris of Cork.

== Playing career ==
=== Club ===
Fitzpatrick played his club hurling with Fenians club in Johnstown. He had much success at underage levels before joining the senior team in the early 1970s. In all he won four Kilkenny SHC titles with the club in 1972, 1973, 1974 and 1977. Fitzpatrick also won a Leinster club hurling title in 1974, but lost to St. Finbarr's of Cork in the All-Ireland final.

=== Inter-county ===
By the early 1970s Fitzpatrick had come to the attention of the Kilkenny inter-county selectors and he quickly joined the minor team. In 1972 he won his first All-Ireland medal when the Kilkenny minors beat the Cork minors in the final. Fitzpatrick quickly moved onto the Kilkenny under-21 team where he won back-to-back All-Ireland medals in 1974 and 1975. These were Kilkenny’s first titles at under-21 level.

Fitzpatrick made his senior debut in a National Hurling League game against Cork in 1973. In 1974 he became a regular in the half-forward line and won his first Leinster medal at senior level. This was subsequently converted into his first senior All-Ireland medal following a win over Limerick. In 1975 Fitzpatrick, although still only 21 years old, was appointed captain of Kilkenny’s senior hurling team. He captured his second Leinster title before leading Kilkenny to victory over Galway in the first 70-minute All-Ireland final. For the next two years Wexford ousted Kilkenny as provincial champions, however, Fitzpatrick won his first National Hurling League title in 1976. "The Cats" were back in 1978 with Fitzpatrick winning his third Leinster title. Kilkenny were subsequently defeated by Cork in the All-Ireland final.

In 1979 Fitzpatrick won his fourth provincial medal before later claiming his third All-Ireland title following another win over Galway. For the next two years Offaly emerged as Leinster champions, however, Fitzpatrick won his second National Hurling League title in 1982, before winning his fifth provincial title. In the subsequent All-Ireland final Kilkenny demolished Cork with Fitzpatrick winning his fourth All-Ireland medal as well as being honoured with his first All-Star award. In 1983 captured a unique double by claiming back-to-back League, Leinster and All-Ireland honours. In the All-Ireland final against Cork Fitzpatrick gave one of the best performances of his life when he scored ten points. Once again he was honoured with another All-Star award.

Fitzpatrick continued playing with Kilkenny until 1986 when he retired following a National League game against Galway.

== Career statistics ==
Team	Year	National League			Munster		All-Ireland		Total	
Team	Year	Division	Apps	Score	Apps	Score	Apps	Score	Apps	Score
Kilkenny	1973-74	Division 1A	x	0-02	x	0-00	2	0-03	x	0-05
Kilkenny	1974-75	Division 1A	x	2-01	2	0-04	1	0-00	x	2-05
Kilkenny	1975-76	Division 1A	x	1-04	x	1-03	—		x	2-07
Kilkenny	1976-77	Division 1A	x	1-10	x	1-02	—		x	2-12
Kilkenny	1977-78	Division 1A	x	1-13	2	1-04	2	1-06	x	3-23
Kilkenny	1978-79	Division 1A	x	1-22	2	1-03	1	0-01	x	2-26
Kilkenny	1979-80	Division 1A	x	1-06	2	2-16	—		x	3-22
Kilkenny	1980-81	Division 1B	x	1-19	1	0-08	—		x	1-27
Kilkenny	1981-82	Division 1B	9	2-39	2	2-12	2	0-12	13	4-63
Kilkenny	1982-83	Division 1	9	4-33	2	1-14	1	0-10	12	5-57
Kilkenny	1983-84	Division 1	9	4-54	2	1-11	—		11	5-65
Kilkenny	1984-85	Division 1	x	1-08	x	0-04	—		x	1-12
Kilkenny	1985-86	Division 1	x	2-06	x	0-00	1	0-01	x	2-07
Career total			x	21-217	x	10-81	x	1-33	x	32-331

Preceded by Nicky Orr	Kilkenny Senior Hurling Captain; 1975	Succeeded by Phil 'Fan' Larkin
Preceded by Nicky Orr (Kilkenny)	All-Ireland Senior Hurling Final winning captain 1975	Succeeded by Ray Cummins (Cork)
