= 1969 All-Ireland Senior Hurling Championship final =

1969 All-Ireland Senior Hurling Final
- Event: 1969 All-Ireland Senior Hurling Championship
Kilkenny	Cork
2-15	2-9
- Date: 7 September 1969
- Venue: Croke Park, Dublin
- Referee: Seán O'Connor (Limerick)
- Attendance: 66,844

The 1969 All-Ireland Senior Hurling Championship Final was the 82nd All-Ireland Final and the culmination of the 1969 All-Ireland Senior Hurling Championship, an inter-county hurling tournament for the top teams in Ireland. The match was held at Croke Park, Dublin on 7 September 1969. The match was contested by 1966 winners Cork and 1967 winners Kilkenny, and it was refereed by Seán O'Connor from Limerick.

== Background ==
The All-Ireland final was the eleventh meeting of Cork and Kilkenny in a championship decider. Kilkenny held the balance of power in all previous meetings between the two, having recorded six All-Ireland victories to Cork's five. Cork, however, also defeated Kilkenny in the 1903 All-Ireland 'home' final before putting London to the sword in the 'proper' final. Both sides last met in the All-Ireland final of 1966 when Cork recorded their first championship victory over Kilkenny in twenty years. Kilkenny enjoyed a reasonably successful period in the mid-sixties, claiming championship titles in 1963 and 1967, while being runners-up in 1964 and 1966. Cork's sole All-Ireland title of the decade came in 1966, a full twelve years after their previous All-Ireland triumph.

Cork's triumph in 1966 allowed them to claim their 20th All-Ireland title, leaving them one behind Tipperary in the all-time roll of honour. A victory for Cork on this occasion would put them level with Tipp, while a victory for Kilkenny would give them their 17th All-Ireland title and would narrow the gap between them and the other two big teams in hurling's trinity.

== Pre-match ==
=== Referee ===
Limerick's Seán O'Connor was named as the referee for the 1969 All-Ireland final on 2 September 1969. His only experience in a national senior decider was the Oireachtas final between Kilkenny and Clare in 1967. Thirty-four-year-old O'Connor, an aircraft mechanic with Aer Lingus, won recognition for his efficient refereeing in National Hurling League and provincial championship games over the previous couple of seasons. He entered the short-list for All-Ireland honours following his handling of the Munster final. O'Connor was an inter-county hurler in his own right with Limerick in the late 1950s and early 1960s and was a dual county medalist with his club Claughaun.

O'Connor's umpires for the final were Jimmy Duggan (Galway), Jimmy Hatton (Wicklow), Jim Kirk (Armagh) and Noel Dalton (Waterford). Hatton was a dual player with Wicklow in the 1950s and was a distinguished referee in his own right, having taken charge of both All-Ireland deciders in 1966.

=== 'The blood and bandage' ===
The All-Ireland final marked a special anniversary for the Cork hurling team. It was the golden jubilee of the first appearance in an All-Ireland decider of Cork's famed red and white colours of the county teams.

== Match ==
=== First half ===
Cork lived up to the favourites tag when, after just two minutes of play, Charlie McCarthy took advantage of a collision between Ray Cummins and Pa Dillon and sent the ball into the net for the first goal of the day. Less than two minutes later Kilkenny responded when Eddie Keher split the posts from a free. What followed over the next fifteen minutes was a series of tit-for-tat scores between both teams. Pat Hegarty from play, Martin Coogan from a 70-yards free, Charlie McCarthy from two frees and Eddie Keher from two frees resulted in Cork leading by a goal. After eighteen minutes of play Cork scored a second goal when Pat Hegarty fired a left-handed ground stroke towards goal which was deflected by Eddie O'Brien past Kilkenny 'keeper Ollie Walsh and into the net. Kilkenny responded immediately with a point from Tommy Murphy, however, this was cancelled out three minutes later when Eddie O'Brien added to his tally with a point. Charlie McCarthy heaped more misery on Kilkenny when he tapped over two more points to give Cork a considerable lead. Mick Lawler started the Kilkenny revival with a point before Martin Brennan exploited a mistake by Cork goalkeeper Paddy Barry and goaled for Kilkenny on the stroke of half-time. That goal put some respectability on the score line, however, Cork were still a goal to the good.

=== Second half ===
Cork started the second-half where they left off when Charlie McCarthy converted a free after a minute. Five minutes into the second period Joe Millea scored Kilkenny's second goal and the comeback was on. Keher pointed a free five minutes later to level the sides for the first time. Charlie McCarthy quickly restored Cork's lead when he pointed from a free also. The final quarter of the match was all Kilkenny. Martin Coogan pointed another 70-yards free to level the scores again before a spectacular Pat Kavanagh point gave Kilkenny the lead for the first time. Martin Brennan stretched the lead to two points before Charlie McCarthy reduced the deficit to a single score when he pointed a free. This was the closest Cork came to victory as 'the Cats' dominated the final seven minutes. Martin Coogan landed a long-range free before Paddy Moran did likewise. The final three scores of the day came from the Kilkenny captain, Eddie Keher, with two coming from frees and one from play.

=== Details ===
07-09-1969
15:15 UTC+1

Kilkenny	2-15 – 2-9	Cork
E. Keher (0-8), M. Brennan (1-1), J. Millea (1-0), M. Coogan (0-3), P. Kavanagh (0-1), P. Moran (0-1), M. Lawlor (0-1).		C. McCarthy (1-6), E. O'Brien (1-1), G. McCarthy (0-1), P. Hegarty (0-1).

Croke Park, Dublin
Attendance: 66,844
Referee: Seán O'Connor (Limerick)

Kilkenny	Cork
