= Jimmy Crampton (hurler) =

Irish hurler

Personal information
- Born: 1949 (age 76–77) Roscrea, County Tipperary, Ireland

Sport
- Sport: Hurling
- Position: Right wing-back
Clubs
- Years: Club
- Roscrea; Inane Rovers
Club titles
- Tipperary titles: 6
- Munster titles: 2
- All-Ireland Titles: 1
Inter-county*
Years	County	Apps (scores)
1972-1975	Tipperary	3 (0-00)
Inter-county titles
- Munster titles: 0
- All-Irelands: 0
- NHL: 0
- All Stars: 0
- *Inter County team apps and scores correct as of 21:36, 31 August 2014.

Jimmy Crampton (born 1949) is an Irish retired hurler who played as a right wing-back for the Tipperary senior team.

Born in Roscrea, County Tipperary, Crampton first arrived on the inter-county scene at the age of twenty when he first linked up with the Tipperary under-21 football team. He joined the senior hurling panel during the 1972 championship. Crampton went on to enjoy a brief career with Tipperary.

At club level Crampton is a one-time All-Ireland medallist with Roscrea. In addition to this he also won two Munster medals and six championship medals.

== Honours ==
=== Player ===
Roscrea

- All-Ireland Senior Club Hurling Championship (1): 1971
- Munster Senior Club Hurling Championship (2): 1969, 1970
- Tipperary Senior Hurling Championship (6): 1968, 1969, 1970, 1972, 1973, 1980
