= 1973 All-Ireland Senior Hurling Championship =

Championship details
- Dates: 13 May – 2 September 1973

All-Ireland champions
- Winning team: Limerick (7th win)
- Captain: Éamonn Grimes

All-Ireland Finalists
- Losing team: Kilkenny
- Captain: Pat Delaney

Provincial champions
- Munster: Limerick
- Leinster: Kilkenny
- Ulster: Not Played
- Connacht: Not Played

Championship statistics
- Top Scorer: Richie Bennis (2–25)
- Player of the Year: Éamonn Grimes
- All-Star Team: See here

The All-Ireland Senior Hurling Championship 1973 was the 87th series of the All-Ireland Senior Hurling Championship, Ireland's premier hurling knock-out competition. Limerick won the championship, beating Kilkenny 1–21 to 1–14 in the final at Croke Park, Dublin.

== Format ==
=== Overview ===
The All-Ireland Senior Hurling Championship of 1973 was run on a provincial basis as usual. It was a knockout tournament with pairings drawn at random in the respective provinces – there were no seeds.

Each match was played as a single leg. If a match was drawn there was a replay. If both sides were still level at the end of that game another replay had to take place.

=== The Championship ===
Munster Championship

Quarter-final: (1 match) This was a single match between the first two teams drawn from the province of Munster.

Semi-finals: (2 matches) The winner of the lone quarter-final joined the other three Munster teams to make up the semi-final pairings.

Final: (1 match) The winner of the two semi-finals contested this game.

Leinster Championship

First Round: (1 match) This was a single match between two of the 'weaker' teams drawn from the province of Leinster.

Quarter-finals: (2 matches) The winner of the first-round game joined three other Leinster teams to make up the two quarter-final pairings.

Semi-finals: (2 matches) The winners of the two quarter-finals joined Kilkenny and Wexford, who received a bye to this stage, to make up the semi-final pairings.

Final: (1 match) The winner of the two semi-finals contested this game.

All-Ireland Championship

Quarter-final: (1 match) This was a single match between London and Galway, two teams who faced no competition in their respective provinces.

Semi-final: (1 matches) The winner of the lone quarter-final joined the Munster champions to make up the semi-final pairing.

Final: (1 match) The winner of the lone semi-final contested this game with the Leinster champions receiving a bye into the final.

== Results ==
=== Leinster Senior Hurling Championship ===
6 May 1973 First round	Westmeath	6–10 – 5–03	Wicklow	O'Moore Park
	C Connaughton 2-3, P Curran 2-1, J Keary 1-4, M Mulligan 1-1, M Fagan 0-1.		T Scott 2-0, M Doyle 1-3, S Doyle 1-0, D Gorman 1-0.	Referee: M Spain (Offaly)

13 May 1973 First round	Offaly	4–12 – 3–6	Kildare	O'Moore Park
	J Kirwan 2–0, J Conroy 2–0, B Moylan 0–4, M Cleere 0–4, S Moylan 0–2, J Dolan 0–1, P McLoughney 0–1.		J Walsh 2–2, T Carew 1–2, B Burke 0–1, T Christian 0–1.	Referee: J Rankins (Laois)

28 May 1973 Quarter-final	Dublin	0–17 – 1–6	Westmeath	Páirc Tailteann
	P Quigley 0–10, JJ Holden 0–2, B Sweeney 0–1, D Brannigan 0–1, M Bermingham 0–1, V Holden 0–1, D Rheinisch 0–1.		K Kenry 1–0, G Whelan 0–2, L Maher 0–2, C Connaughton 0–1, K Gavan 0–1.	Referee: J Kearns (Offaly)

28 May 1973 Quarter-final	Offaly	3–10 – 3–10	Laois	St. Brendan's Park
	B Moylan 0–7, P Horan 1–1, S Moylan 1–0, J Kirwan 1–0, M Cleere 0–2.		G Linehan 2–6, T Keenan 1–1, F Keenan 0–2, M Walshe 0–1.	Referee: J Murphy (Kilkenny)

10 June 1973 Quarter-final replay	Laois	3–10 – 5–6	Offaly	O'Moore Park
	E Dollard 1–3, G Conroy 1–1, G Lanham 0–4, G Cuddy 1–0, P Dillon 0–1, P Dowling 0–1.		B Moylan 2–4, P Mulcare 2–1, W Gorman 1–0, P Horan 0–1.	Referee: J Murphy (Kilkenny)

10 June 1973 Semi-final	Kilkenny	2–19 – 2–11	Dublin	Wexford Park
	E Keher 0–10, M Brennan 1–2, K Purcell 1–0, P Broderick 0–2, S Cooke 0–2, P Delaney 0–2, B Cody 0–1.		P Quigley 0–6, M Bermingham 1–1, D Rheinisch 1–1, R Walsh 0–1, H Dalton 0–1, M Holden 0–1.	Referee: J Rankins (Laois)

24 June 1973 Semi-final	Wexford	2–14 – 2–9	Offaly	Nowlan Park
	T Doran 2–1, T Byrne 0–6, M Maher 0–2, N Buggy 0–2, D Bernie 0–1, C Keogh 0–1, M Quigley 0–1.		B Moylan 1–3, J Flaherty 1–3, J Kirwan 0–1, E Moyles 0–1, P Corcoran 0–1.	Referee: J Murphy (Kilkenny)

8 July 1973 Final	Kilkenny	4–22 – 3–15	Wexford	Croke Park
	E Keher 0–11, P Delaney 2–2, M Brennan 1–4, K Purcell 1–2, P Broderick 0–2, L O'Brien 0–1.		T Byrne 2–6, M Quigley 0–4, J Berry 1–0, P Wilson 0–1, N Buggy 0–1, C Jacob 0–1, T Doran 0–1, C Keogh 0–1.

=== Munster Senior Hurling Championship ===
20 May 1973 Quarter-final	Tipperary	1–16 – 2–8	Waterford	Semple Stadium
	F Loughnane 0–8, D Ryan 1–0, J Flanagan 0–3, L Gaynor 0–2, N O'Dwyer 0–1, J Ryan 0–1, S Hogan 0–1.		S Greene 1–1, J Kirwan 1–1, P Enright 0–4, M Kirwan 0–1, M Hickey 0–1.	Referee: S O'Connor (Limerick)

24 June 1973 Semi-final	Limerick	3–11 – 3–9	Clare	Semple Stadium
	É Cregan 2–1, B Hartigan 1–1, R Bennis 0–3, É Grimes 0–2, M Dowling 0–2, F Nolan 0–1, L O'Donoghue 0–1.		T Ryan 0–5, G Lohan 1–0, M O'Connor 1–0, J Callanan 1–0, P Russell 0–2, N Ryan 0–1, M McKeogh 0–1.	Referee: S Moloney (Tipperary)

1 July 1973 Semi-final	Tipperary	5–4 – 1–10	Cork	Gaelic Grounds
	R Ryan 2–0, S Hogan 1–1, F Loughnane 1–1, J Flanagan 1–0, PJ Ryan 0–1, P Byrne 0–1.		G McCarthy 0–8, M Malone 1–1, P Moylan 0–1.	Referee: M Slattery (Clare)

29 July 1973 Final	Tipperary	2–18 – 6–7	Limerick	Semple Stadium
	F Loughnane 2–10, M Keating 0–4, S Hogan 0–2, J Flanagan 0–1, N O'Dwyer 0–1.		R Bennis 1–5, F Nolan 2–1, É Cregan 2–0, M Dowling 1–0, L O'Donoghue 0–1.	Referee: M Slattery (Clare)

=== All-Ireland Senior Hurling Championship ===
29 July 1973 Quarter-final	London	4–7 – 3–5	Galway	Dunlo GAA Ground
	L Burke 2–0, F Canning 1–1, P O'Neill 1–1, B Barry 0–4, Martin Linnane 0–1.		G Holland 1–0, J Faul 1–0, E Burke 1–1, G Cone 0–2, P Fahy 0–2.	Referee: M Spain (Offaly)

5 August 1973 Semi-final	Limerick	1–15 – 0–7	London	Cusack Park
	R Bennis 1–7, L O'Donoghue 0–4, É Cregan 0–2, B Hartigan 0–1, F Nolan 0–1.		F Canning 0–2, P O'Neill 0–2, L Corless 0–1, T Connolly 0–1, P McDermott 0–1.	Referee: M Spain (Offaly)

2 September 1973 Final	Limerick	1–21 – 1–14	Kilkenny	Croke Park
	R Bennis (0–10), M Dowling (1–1), É Grimes (0–4), F Nolan (0–2), N Rea (0–2), B Hartigan (0–1), J McKenna (0–1).		C Dunne (0–7), P Delaney (1–1), M Crotty (0–3), L O'Brien (0–2), M Brennan(0–1).	Attendance: 58,009; Referee: M Slattery (Clare)

== Top scorers ==
Overall

Rank	Player	County	Tally	Total	Matches	Average
1	Richie Bennis	Limerick	2–25	31	4	7.75
2	Francis Loughnane	Tipperary	3–19	28	3	9.33
3	Barney Moylan	Offaly	3–18	27	4	6.75
4	Eddie Keher	Kilkenny	0–21	21	2	10.50
5	Tom Byrne	Wexford	2–12	18	2	9.00
6	George Lanham	Laois	2–10	16	2	8.00
6	Pat Quigley	Dublin	0–16	16	2	8.00
8	Éamonn Cregan	Limerick	4–3	15	4	3.75
9	Pat Delaney	Kilkenny	3–5	14	3	4.66
10	Mick Brennan	Kilkenny	2–7	13	3	4.33

Single game

Rank	Player	County	Tally	Total	Opposition
1	Francis Loughnane	Tipperary	2–10	16	Limerick
2	Tom Byrne	Wexford	2–6	12	Kilkenny
2	George Lanham	Laois	2–6	12	Offaly
4	Eddie Keher	Kilkenny	0–11	11	Wexford
5	Barney Moylan	Offaly	2–4	10	Laois
5	Richie Bennis	Limerick	1–7	10	London
5	Richie Bennis	Limerick	0–10	10	Kilkenny
5	Eddie Keher	Kilkenny	0–10	10	Dublin
5	Pat Quigley	Dublin	0–10	10	Westmeath
10	Johnny Walsh	Kildare	2–2	8	Offaly
10	Pat Delaney	Kilkenny	2–2	8	Offaly
10	Richie Bennis	Limerick	1–5	8	Tipperary
10	Francis Loughnane	Tipperary	0–8	8	Waterford
10	Gerald McCarthy	Cork	0–8	8	Tipperary

== Championship statistics ==
=== Miscellaneous ===
- Limerick win the Munster title for the first time since 1955.
- Kilkenny win the Leinster title for the third consecutive year. It is their seventh provincial three-in-a-row.
- London's win over Galway in the All-Ireland quarter-final is their first championship victory since defeating Cork in the 1901 All-Ireland final.
- In the All-Ireland semi-final between Limerick and London, a unique situation arose when brothers Ned and Gerry Rea marked one another. Ned was full-forward on the Limerick team while Gerry was at full-back for London.
- Limerick win the All-Ireland title for the first time since 1940. It was their first time playing Kilkenny in the championship since then.

== Player facts ==
=== Debutantes ===
The following players made their début in the 1973 championship:

Player	Team	Date	Opposition	Game
Jimmy Crampton	Tipperary	May 20	Waterford	Munster quarter-final
Mick Culligan	Clare	June 24	Limerick	Munster semi-final
Seán Hehir	Clare	June 24	Limerick	Munster semi-final
Séamus Horgan	Limerick	June 24	Clare	Munster semi-final
Ger Loughnane	Clare	June 24	Limerick	Munster semi-final
Michael O'Connor	Clare	June 24	Limerick	Munster semi-final
Noel Ryan	Clare	June 24	Limerick	Munster semi-final
Tim Ryan	Clare	June 24	Limerick	Munster semi-final
Joe McKenna	Limerick	June 24	Clare	Munster semi-final
John Buckley	Cork	July 1	Tipperary	Munster semi-final
Noel Dunne	Cork	July 1	Tipperary	Munster semi-final
Pat Moylan	Cork	July 1	Tipperary	Munster semi-final
Tom Ryan	Limerick	July 29	Tipperary	Munster final
Brian Cody	Kilkenny	September 2	Limerick	All-Ireland final

=== Retirees ===
The following players played their last game in the 1973 championship:

Player	Team	Last Game	Date	Opposition	Début
Jimmy Doyle	Tipperary	Munster quarter-final	May 20	Waterford	1957
Mick Culligan	Clare	Munster semi-final	June 24	Limerick	1973
Mick Kilmartin	Clare	Munster semi-final	June 24	Limerick	1971
Michael O'Connor	Clare	Munster semi-final	June 24	Limerick	1973
Tim Ryan	Clare	Munster semi-final	June 24	Limerick	1973
Jimmy Crampton	Tipperary	July 29	Munster final	Waterford	1973
Len Gaynor	Tipperary	July 29	Munster final	Waterford	1973
Christy Jacob	Wexford	Leinster final	August 5	Kilkenny	1966
Éamonn Morrissey	Kilkenny	Leinster final	August 5	Wexford	1972
Martin Coogan	Kilkenny	All-Ireland final	September 2	Limerick	1961
John Kinsella	Kilkenny	All-Ireland final	September 2	Limerick	1967

== Sources ==
- Corry, Eoghan, The GAA Book of Lists (Hodder Headline Ireland, 2005).
- Donegan, Des, The Complete Handbook of Gaelic Games (DBA Publications Limited, 2005).
- Sweeney, Éamonn, Munster Hurling Legends (The O'Brien Press, 2002).
