= P. J. Thomas =

P. J. Thomas may refer to:

- P. J. Thomas, Parakunnel (1895-1965), Economist
- P. J. Thomas, Polayil (b. 1951), Civil servant
- P. J. Thomas (pastor) (1914-1998), Pentecostal pastor

== See also ==
- Thomas (surname)
