= P. J. Sebastian =

Indian freedom fighter and social activist

P. J. Sebastian was an Indian freedom fighter and social activist from Changanacherry, Kerala.
