= 1974–75 All-Ireland Senior Club Hurling Championship =

All-Ireland Senior Club Hurling Championship 1974–75
Championship Details
- Dates: 1 December 1974 – 16 March 1975
- Teams: 25

All Ireland Champions
- Winners: St. Finbarr's (1st win)
- Captain: Jim Power

All Ireland Runners-up
- Runners-up: Fenians Johnstown
- Captain: Martin Fitzpatrick

Provincial Champions
- Munster: St. Finbarr's
- Leinster: Fenians Johnstown
- Ulster: Ballycran
- Connacht: Ardrahan

Championship Statistics
- Top Scorer: Jimmy Barry-Murphy (8–13)

The 1974–75 All-Ireland Senior Club Hurling Championship was the fifth staging of the All-Ireland Senior Club Hurling Championship, the Gaelic Athletic Association's premier inter-county club hurling tournament. The championship ran from 1 December 1974 to 16 March 1975.

Blackrock of Cork were the defending champions, however, they failed to qualify after being beaten by St. Finbarr's in the 1974 Cork SHC final. Abbeydorney of Kerry made their championship debut.

The All-Ireland final was played on 16 March 1975 at Croke Park in Dublin, between St. Finbarr's of Cork and Fenians of Kilkenny, in what was their first ever championship meeting. St. Finbarr's won the match by 3–08 to 1–06 to claim their first ever All-Ireland title.

Jimmy Barry-Murphy was the championship's top scorer with 8–13.

== Connacht Senior Club Hurling Championship ==
=== Connacht quarter-finals ===
Quarter-final	Tooreen	w/o – scr.	St. Finbarr's

24 November 1974 Quarter-final	Tremane	w/o – scr.	Craobh Rua	Athleague Sportsfield

=== Connacht semi-final ===
1 December 1975 Semi-final	Tooreen	3–05 – 0–11	Tremane	Fr. O'Hara Park
	T Henry 1–2, W Stenson 1–0, E Mulrennan 1–0, J Henry 0–3.		R Sallon 0–3, S Kilroy 0–3, J Kilroy 0–2, T Healy 0–2, J Coyne 0–1.	Referee: M Donlon (Sligo)

=== Connacht final ===
2 February 1975 Final	Tooreen	1–06 – 9–12	Ardrahan	Ballyhaunis Grounds
	J Henry 1–5, E Mulrennan 0–1.		M Whelan 4–1, J O'Mahony 1–6, G Curtin 1–1, V Mullins 1–1, B Forde 1–0, M Kearns 1–0, M Cunningham 0–2, JJ O'Dea 0–1.

== Leinster Senior Club Hurling Championship ==
=== Leinster first round ===
1 December 1974 First round	Carnew Emmets	3–13 – 2–05	Suncroft	Aughrim County Ground
	M Lalor 2-6, M Synott 1-0, T Kennedy 0-2, L Collins 0-2, M Doyle 0-2, T Collins 0-1.		M Deely 1-1, J Barrett 1-0, E Sheehan 0-2, T White 0-1, T Doyle 0-1.

1 December 1974 First round	Castlepollard	0–07 – 2–09	Boardsmill	Cusack Park
	T McIntyre 0-5, J Keary 0-2.		D Fay 1-2, S Carney 1-1, M Reilly 0-3, M Mooney 0-1, S Garrigan 0-1, V Guy 0-1.

1 December 1974 First round	The Fenians	3–07 – 1–07	Rathnure	Nowlan Park
	J Moriarty 1–2, P Delaney 1–1, B Fitzpatrick 1–0, M Garrett 0–2, B Watson 0–1, P Broderick 0–1.		D Quigley 0–5, M Quigley 1–0, J Murphy 0–1, J Quigley 0–1.

=== Leinster quarter-finals ===
1 December 1974 Quarter-final	St Rynagh's	2–03 – 0–09	Camross	St Brendan's Park
	S Moylan 1–0, P Horan 1–0, PJ Whelehan 0–2, J Horan 0–1.		F Keenan 0–3, M Carroll 0–2, M Cuddy 0–2, P Dowling 0–1, M Cuddy 0–1.

8 December 1974 Quarter-final	Boardsmill	3–13 – 0–04	Naomh Moninne	St Loman's Park

15 December 1974 Quarter-final	Carnew Emmets	3–07 – 4–05	Faughs	Aughrim County Ground
	M Lalor 2–5, T Collins 1–1, M Doyle 0–1.		J Cunningham 2–3, J Bennett 1–1, N Rea 1–0, J Derwin 0–1.

15 December 1974 Quarter-final	The Fenians	5–14 – 0–04	Naomh Eoin	Nowlan Park
	J Moriarty 1–7, E Graham 2–1, B Watson 2–1, P Delaney 0–3, P Broderick 0–2.		M Nolan 0–1, J O'Hara 0–1, E Quirke 0–1, L Fox 0–1.

15 December 1974 Quarter-final replay	Camross	1–06 – 2–08	St Rynagh's	Kelly Daly Park
	F Keenan 0–5, Martin Cuddy 1–0, G Cuddy 0–1.		B Moylan 1–1, B Lyons 1–1, G Burke 0–2, J Horan 0–1, S Moylan 0–1, G Woods 0–1, PJ Whelehan 0–1,

=== Leinster semi-finals ===
12 January 1975 Semi-final	St Rynagh's	1–10 – 0–09	Boardsmill	St. Brendan's Park
	M Moylan 1–4, PJ Whelehan 0–2, B Lyons 0–1, H Dolan 0–1, G Woods 0–1, P Horan 0–1.		S Carney 0–3, S Garrigan 0–3, M Mooney 0–1, D Fay 0–1, L Gibbons 0–1.	Referee: J Rankins (Laois)

12 January 1975 Semi-final	The Fenians	2–09 – 0–07	Faughs	Nowlan Park
	J Moriarty 0–5, P Delaney 1–1, B Watson 1–0, B Fitzpatrick 0–2, G Henderson 0–1.		J Cunningham 0–3, K Maher 0–1, N Rea 0–1, C Muldoon 0–1, J Bennett 0–1.	Referee: M Spain (Offaly)

=== Leinster final ===
26 January 1975 Final	The Fenians	2–06 – 1–06	St Rynagh's	Croke Park
	M Garrett 1–1, B Fitzpatrick 0–4, P Fitzpatrick 1–0, J Moriarty 0–1.		B Moylan 0–4, M Moylan 1–0, PJ Whelehan 0–1, P Horan 0–1.	Referee: J Rankins (Laois)

== Munster Senior Club Hurling Championship ==
=== Munster quarter-finals ===
1 December 1974 Quarter-final	Kilmallock	6–16 – 0–04	Abbeydorney	Páirc Mac Gearailt
	B Savage 3–1, T Smith 1–8, D O'Riordan 2–2, M Finn 0–2, T Moloney 0–1, P Kelly 0–1, M Dowling 0–1.		T Behan 0–2, T Lyons 0–1, B Keane 0–1.	Referee: J Woods (Clare)

1 December 1974 Quarter-final	Mount Sion	3–03 – 5–12	St. Finbarr's	Walsh Park
	M Óg Morrissey 1–0, S Greene 1–0, P Kelly 1–0, P O'Grady 0–2, M Geary 0–1.		J Barry-Murphy 2–4, B Scully 2–0, J O'Shea 1–2, S Gillen 0–3, E Fitzpatrick 0–1, G McCarthy 0–1, C McCarthy 0–1.	Referee: D Dowling (Kilkenny)

=== Munster semi-finals ===
17 November 1974 Semi-final	Newmarket-on-Fergus	2–10 – 0–09	Thurles Sarsfields	Fr. Murphy Memorial Park
	S Liddy 1–2, J McNamara 0–5, T Ryan 1–1, C Woods 0–1, P McNamara 0–1.		J Doyle Snr 0–4, E Clancy 0–1, P McCormack 0–1, P Byrne 0–1, S Murphy 0–1, J Doyle 0–1.	Referee: P Cronin (Cork)

15 December 1974 Semi-final	St. Finbarr's	4–12 – 0–09	Kilmallock	The Mardyke
	J Barry-Murphy 2–2, B Scully 2–0, J O'Shea 0–3, S Gillen 0–3, G McCarthy 0–2, S McCarthy 0–1, E Fitzpatrick 0–1.		T Smith 0–4, P Kelly 0–3, T Moloney 0–1, D O'Riordan 0–1.	Referee: H Moloney (Tipperary)

=== Munster final ===
19 January 1975 Final	St. Finbarr's	0–07 – 0–03	Newmarket-on-Fergus	Gaelic Grounds
	C McCarthy 0–4, S Gillen 0–1, G McCarthy 0–1, J Barry-Murphy 0–1.		C Woods 0–2, M Pewter 0–1.	Referee: S O'Connor (Limerick)

== Ulster Senior Club Hurling Championship ==
=== Ulster semi-final ===
1 December 1974 Semi-final	Dungiven	1–08 – 4–06	Ballycran	Lavey Grounds
	S Stephenson 0-6, F Kennedy 1-0, P Mallon 0-1, P Stephenson 0-1.		B Mullen 1-3, T Brown 1-1, Bro Augustine 1-1, C O'Flynn 1-0, M O'Flynn 0-1.

=== Ulster final ===
8 December 1974 Final	Sarsfields	3–02 – 3–05	Ballycran	Corrigan Park
	A Thorneberry 1–0, S Doherty 1–0, E McGarrigle 1–0, S Ward 0–2.		M O'Flynn 2–1, B Gilmore 1–0, S Mullan 0–1, J Martin 0–1, B Mullan 0–1, T Browne 0–1.	Referee: F Carlisle (Armagh)

== All-Ireland Senior Club Hurling Championship ==
=== All-Ireland semi-finals ===
23 February 1975 Semi-final	Fenians	2–13 – 1–08	Ardrahan	Duggan Park
	B Fitzpatrick 1–8, JJ Tobin 1–1, J Moriarty 0–2, B Watson 0–1, P Henderson 0–1.		M Bond 0–4, M Whelan 1–0, V Mullins 0–3, N Geoghegan 0–1.	Referee: J Moloney (Tipperary)

23 February 1975 Semi-final	Ballycran	3–10 – 8–08	St Finbarr's	McKenna Park
	T Browne 2–0, B Gilmore 0–5, J Martin 1–0, B Mullan 0–3, B Gordon 0–2.		J Barry-Murphy 3–2, C McCarthy 2–1, S Looney 2–0, G O'Shea 1–2, E Fitzpatrick 0–2, S Gillen 0–1.	Referee: D Robinson (Kildare)

=== All-Ireland final ===
16 March 1975 Final	St Finbarr's	3–08 – 1–06	The Fenians	Croke Park
	J Barry-Murphy 1–4, C Cullinane 1–0, J O'Shea 1–0, C Roche 0–2, C McCarthy 0–1, E Fitzpatrick 0–1.		P Delaney 1–0, B Fitzpatrick 0–2, J Moriarty 0–1, J Ryan 0–1, M Garrett 0–1, P Henderson 0–1.	Attendance: 3,000; Referee: M Spain (Offaly)

== Championship statistics ==
=== Top scorers ===
Rank	Player	Club	Tally	Total	Matches	Average
1	Jimmy Barry-Murphy	St Finbarr's	8–13	37	5	7.40
2	Johnny Moriarty	The Fenians	2–18	24	6	4.00
3	Mick Lalor	Carnew Emmets	4–11	23	2	11.50
4	Billy Fitzpatrick	The Fenians	2–16	22	5	4.40
5	Michael Whelan	Ardrahan	5–01	16	2	8.00
6	Jerry O'Shea	St Finbarr's	3–07	16	5	3.20
7	Tony Smith	Kilmallock	1–12	15	2	7.50
8	Pat Delaney	Fenians	3–05	14	6	2.33
9	Charlie McCarthy	St Finbarr's	2–07	13	5	2.60
10	Bernard Scully	St Finbarr's	4–00	12	3	4.00
10	Joe Cunningham	Faughs	2–06	12	3	4.00
