= Nicky Orr =

Irish retired hurler (born 1947)

Personal information
- Native name: Nioclás Mac Iomhaire (Irish)
- Born: 23 February 1948 (age 78) Johnstown, County Kilkenny, Ireland
- Occupation: Truck driver
- Height: 5 ft 11 in (180 cm)

Sport
- Sport: Hurling
- Position: Full-back
Clubs
- Years: Club
- 1964-1967 1968-1986: St. Finbarr's; Fenians
Club titles
- Kilkenny titles: 5
- Leinster titles: 1
Inter-county
Years	County	Apps (scores)
1969-1976	Kilkenny	13 (0-00)
Inter-county titles
- Leinster titles: 5
- All-Irelands: 3
- NHL: 1
- All Stars: 0

Nicholas "Nicky" Orr (born 23 February 1948) is an Irish retired hurler whose league and championship career with the Kilkenny senior team spanned nine seasons from 1969 to 1976. Children: Patricia Orr (Thornton)

Born near Johnstown, County Kilkenny, Orr first played competitive hurling during his schooling at Johnstown national school. He began his club hurling career with the St. Finbarr's team, before later joining the Fenians club when it was formed in 1968. Orr won a county junior championship medal that year, which guaranteed promotion to the senior ranks the following year. An All-Ireland runner-up in 1975, he also won one Leinster medal and five county senior championship medals.

Orr made his debut on the inter-county scene at the age of twenty when he was selected for the Kilkenny intermediate team. A Leinster medal winner in this grade, he later joined the under-21 team, ending his tenure in this grade as an All-Ireland runner-up in 1968. Orr made his senior debut during the 1969-70 league. Over the course of the next nine seasons, he won three All-Ireland medals, beginning with a lone triumph in 1972 followed by back-to-back championships in 1974 and 1975. The All-Ireland-winning captain of 1974, Orr also won five Leinster medals and one National Hurling League medal. A broken kneecap in 1976 brought his inter-county career to an end.

Selected as a substitute on the Leinster inter-provincial team in 1975, Orr won his only Railway Cup medal that year.

== Career statistics ==
Team	Year	National League			Leinster		All-Ireland		Total	
Team	Year	Division	Apps	Score	Apps	Score	Apps	Score	Apps	Score
Kilkenny	1969-70	Division 1	0	0-00	0	0-00	0	0-00	0	0-00
Kilkenny	1970-71	Division 1	0	0-00	0	0-00	0	0-00	0	0-00
Kilkenny	1971-72	Division 1	4	0-00	0	0-00	1	0-00	5	0-00
Kilkenny	1972-73	Division 1	7	0-00	2	0-00	1	0-00	10	0-00
Kilkenny	1973-74	Division 1	6	0-00	2	0-00	2	0-00	10	0-00
Kilkenny	1974-75	Division 1	5	0-00	2	0-00	1	0-00	8	0-00
Kilkenny	1975-76	Division 1	8	0-00	2	0-00	0	0-00	10	0-00
Kilkenny	1976-77	Division 1	0	0-00	0	0-00	0	0-00	0	0-00
Total			30	0-00	8	0-00	5	0-00	43	0-00

== Honours ==
Fenians

- Leinster Senior Club Hurling Championship (1): 1974
- Kilkenny Senior Hurling Championship (5): 1970, 1972, 1973, 1974, 1977
- Kilkenny Junior Hurling Championship (1): 1969
- Kilkenny Junior Football Championship (1): 1971

Kilkenny

- All-Ireland Senior Hurling Championship (3): 1972, 1974 (c), 1975
- Leinster Senior Hurling Championship (5): 1971, 1972, 1973, 1974 (c), 1975
- National Hurling League (1): 1975-76
- Leinster Intermediate Hurling Championship (1): 1967

Leinster

- Railway Cup (1): 1975

Sporting positions
Preceded by Pat Delaney	Kilkenny Senior Hurling Captain; 1974	Succeeded by Billy Fitzpatrick
Achievements
Preceded by Éamonn Grimes	All-Ireland Senior Hurling Final winning captain 1974	Succeeded by Billy Fitzpatrick
