= Coon GAA =

Gaelic Athletic Association club

Coon
- An Cuan
- Founded: 1948
- County: Kilkenny
- Colours: Green and white
- Grounds: Coon

Playing kits
Standard colours

Senior Club Championships
	All Ireland	Leinster champions	Kilkenny champions
Hurling:	0	0	0

Coon GAA was a Gaelic Athletic Association club located in Coon, County Kilkenny, Ireland. The club was primarily concerned with the game of hurling.

== History ==
Hurling had been played in the Coon area since the early 1940s when the arrival of a new schoolteacher resulted in a minor team being established. A new curate arrived in the parish in 1947 and, under his influence, Coon GAA Club was established in 1948.

After losing Kilkenny JHC finals to Mooncoin in 1961 and Thomastown in 1962, Coon finally made the breakthrough by capturing the title in 1967. This victory earned promotion to the Kilkenny SHC. Coon lined out in the top flight until regrading to the newly created Kilkenny IHC in 1973. The decision was a successful one as they claimed the title that year. Coon had returned to the junior ranks by the end of the 1970s.

Coon amalgamated with the Muckalee/Ballyfoyle Rangers club in 1982, resulting in the creation of the St. Martin's club.

== Honours ==
- Kilkenny Intermediate Hurling Championship (1): 1973
- Kilkenny Junior Hurling Championship (1): 1967
- Northern Kilkenny Junior Hurling Championship (13): 1961, 1962, 1967

== Notable players ==
- Mick Lawler: All-Ireland SHC-winner (1969)
