= 1933 All-Ireland Senior Hurling Championship final =

1933 All-Ireland Senior Hurling Final
- Event: 1933 All-Ireland Senior Hurling Championship
Kilkenny	Limerick
1–7	0–6
- Date: 3 September 1933
- Venue: Croke Park, Dublin
- Referee: Stephen Jordan (Galway)
- Attendance: 45,176

The 1933 All-Ireland Senior Hurling Championship Final was the 46th All-Ireland Final and the culmination of the 1933 All-Ireland Senior Hurling Championship, an inter-county hurling tournament for the top teams in Ireland. The match was held at Croke Park, Dublin, on 3 September 1933, between Limerick and Kilkenny. The Munster champions lost to their Leinster opponents on a score line of 1–7 to 0–6.

== Match details ==
1933-09-03
15:15 UTC+1

Kilkenny	1–7 – 0–6	Limerick

Croke Park, Dublin
Attendance: 45,176
Referee: S. Jordan (Galway)

Kilkenny	Limerick
