= 1973 Kilkenny Senior Hurling Championship =

Annual hurling competition season

- Champions: Fenians (3rd title)
- Runners-up: James Stephens

The 1973 Kilkenny Senior Hurling Championship was the 79th staging of the Kilkenny Senior Hurling Championship since its establishment by the Kilkenny County Board.

On 14 October 1973, the Fenians were the defending champions.

Fenians won the championship after a 7–08 to 5–10 defeat of James Stephens in the final. It was their third championship title overall and their second title in succession.

== Results ==
=== Final ===
14 October 1973 Final	Fenians	7-08 - 5-10	James Stephens	Nowlan Park, Kilkenny
	B Fitzpatrick 3-0, P Delaney 2-1, J Moriarty 1-2, B Watson 1-0, P Broderick 0-2, R Dowling 0-1, G Murphy 0-1, M Garrett 0-1.		T Ryan 2-1, M Leahy 1-2, N Byrne 1-1, M Crotty 0-4, J Dwyer 1-0, L O'Brien 0-2.	Referee: P Johnston
