= 1968 All-Ireland Under-21 Hurling Championship =

All-Ireland Under-21 Hurling Championship 1968
All Ireland Champions
- Winners: Cork (2nd win)
- Captain: Pat Hegarty

All Ireland Runners-up
- Runners-up: Kilkenny
- Captain: John Kinsella

Provincial Champions
- Munster: Cork
- Leinster: Kilkenny
- Ulster: Not Played
- Connacht: Not Played

The 1968 All-Ireland Under-21 Hurling Championship was the fifth staging of the All-Ireland hurling championship for players under the age of twenty-one since its establishment by the Gaelic Athletic Association in 1964..

Tipperary were the defending champions, however, they were defeated in the provincial stage. Cork won the title after defeating Kilkenny by 2-18 to 3-9 in the final.

== Leinster Under-21 Hurling Championship ==
=== Leinster final ===
21 July 1968 Final	Kilkenny	4-10 – 5-04	Dublin	Nowlan Park
15:30	B O'Sullivan 2-1, W Harte 1-3, P Keyes 1-3, T Grant 0-2, P Dowling 0-1.		L Hannebury 2-1, N Kinsella 1-1, J Hackett 1-0, P McCarthy 1-0, T Grealish 0-1, H Dalton 0-1.	Referee: J Maddock (Wexford)

== Munster Under-21 Hurling Championship ==
=== Munster first round ===
7 April 1968 First round	Tipperary	4-05 – 3-03	Waterford	Leahy Park, Cashel
	J Flanagan 1-2, S Hogan 1-1, M Ryan 1-0, D Fay 1-0, T Delaney 0-2.		J Geoghegan 2-1, B Scanlon 1-0, N Kelly 0-1, M Hickey 0-1.	Referee: G Fitzgerald (Limerick)

7 April 1968 First round	Limerick	3-06 – 7-08	Cork	Gaelic Grounds, Limerick
15:30	N Hayes 1-0, P Bennis 1-0, É Grimes 1-0, J Foley 0-2, P Doherty 0-2, C Shanahan 0-1, R Ryan 0-1.		S Murphy 2-0, P Curley 2-0, M Malone 2-0, B Meade 1-2, J Murphy 0-3, N O'Keeffe 0-2, P Ring 0-1.	Referee: M Slattery (Clare)

16 May 1968 First round	Galway	2-05 - 4-02	Clare	Duggan Park
	I Madden 1-0, T Quinn 1-0, P Fahy 0-3, J Connolly 0-2.		J McNamara 2-1, M Culligan 1-0, P O'Leary 1-0, S O'Donnell 0-1.

=== Munster semi-finals ===
15 May 1968 Semi-final	Kerry	3-02 – 8-11	Cork	Fitzgerald Stadium

11 July 1968 Semi-final	Clare	0-09 – 2-07	Tipperary	Cusack Park
	N Casey 0-3, D Fitzgerald 0-2, J McNamara 0-2, P Russell 0-1, P Higgins 0-1.		N O'Dwyer 0-4, D Fahy 1-0, T Delaney 1-0, J Walsh 0-1, M Ryan 0-1, S Hogan 0-1.	Referee: G Fitzgerald (Limerick)

=== Munster final ===
4 August 1968 Final	Tipperary	1-13 – 4-10	Cork	Seán Treacy Park
15:30	P Morrissey 1-1, T Delaney 0-4, N Dwyer 0-3, J Walsh 0-2, S Hogan 0-2, D Ryan 0-1.		P Hegarty 1-1, P Ring 1-1, H O'Sullivan 1-0, S Murphy 1-0, B Meade 0-3, P Moylan 0-3, J Murphy 0-2.	Referee: G Fitzgerald (Limerick)

== All-Ireland Under-21 Hurling Championship ==
=== All-Ireland semi-final ===
18 August 1968 Semi-final	Antrim	4-17 – 2-04	Cork	Fr. Healy Park

=== All-Ireland final ===
8 September 1968 Final	Cork	2-18 – 3-09	Kilkenny	Walsh Park
15:30	B Meade 1-12, P Curley 1-2, P Hegarty 0-2, R Lehane 0-1, P Moylan 0-1.		W Harte 1-8, P Lalor 1-0, P Keyes 1-0, J Kinsella 0-1.	Attendance: 7,000; Referee: S Power (Waterford)
