= 1972 Kilkenny Senior Hurling Championship =

Annual hurling competition season

- Dates: 14 May 1972 - 29 October 1972
- Teams: 16
- Champions: Fenians (2nd title)
- Runners-up: Bennettsbridge

The 1972 Kilkenny Senior Hurling Championship was the 78th staging of the Kilkenny Senior Hurling Championship since its establishment by the Kilkenny County Board. The draw for the first-round fixtures took place on 2 March 1972. The championship began on 14 May 1972 and ended on 29 October 1972.

Bennettsbridge were the defending champions.

Fenians won the championship after a 3–10 to 1–06 defeat of Bennettsbridge in the final. It was their second championship title overall and their first in two championship seasons.

== Team changes ==
=== To Championship ===
Promoted from the Kilkenny Junior Hurling Championship

- Newpark Sarsfields

== Results ==
=== Semi-finals ===
1 October 1972 Semi-final	Fenians	4-16 - 4-06	Young Irelands	Nowlan Park

15 October 1972 Semi-final	Bennettsbridge	2-12 - 3-04	Thomastown	Nowlan Park

=== Final ===
29 October 1972 Final	Fenians	3-10 - 1-06	Bennettsbridge	Nowlan Park
	P Broderick 1-6, T O'Connell 1-0, B Watson 1-0, P Delaney 0-2, M Garrett 0-1, P Henderson 0-1.		W Kennedy 0-4, K Dunne 1-0, C Hayes 0-1, P Moran 0-1.
