= 1970 Kilkenny Senior Hurling Championship =

Annual hurling competition season

- Dates: 17 May 1970 - 4 October 1970
- Teams: 14
- Champions: Fenians (1st title)
- Runners-up: James Stephens

The 1970 Kilkenny Senior Hurling Championship was the 76th staging of the Kilkenny Senior Hurling Championship since its establishment by the Kilkenny County Board. The championship began on 17 May 1970 and ended on 4 October 1970.

James Stephens were the defending champions.

On 4 October 1970, Fenians won the championship after a 2–11 to 3–05 defeat of James Stephens in the final. It was their first ever championship.

== Team changes ==
=== To Championship ===
Promoted from the Kilkenny Junior Hurling Championship

- Clara

=== From Championship ===
Regraded to the Kilkenny Junior Hurling Championship

- Newpark Sarsfields

== Results ==
=== Semi-finals ===
13 September 1970 Semi-final	James Stephens	2-09 - 2-05	Bennettsbridge	Nowlan Park, Kilkenny
	S Leahy 2-0, M Crotty 0-5, N Morrissey 0-2, E Tallent 0-1, E Byrne 0-1.		M McCarthy 1-1, N Ryan 1-0, J Kinsella 0-2, J Holohan 0-1, P Moran 0-1.

13 September 1970 Semi-final	Fenians	2-16 - 2-05	Young Irelands	Nowlan Park, Kilkenny
	W Watson 1-3, J Broderick 1-3, P Delaney 0-3, T O'Connell 0-3, J Moriarty 0-3, F Holohan 0-1.		M Dwyer 1-3, S Kelly 1-0, B Phelan 0-2.

=== Final ===
4 October 1970 Final	Fenians	2-11 - 3-05	James Stephens	Nowlan Park, Kilkenny
	J Moriarty 0-6, T O'Connell 1-0, P Delaney 1-0, P Henderson 0-2, M Garrett 0-1, M Dowling 0-1, D Walsh 0-1.		S Leahy 1-1, E Tallent 1-1, P Brennan 1-0, L O'Brien 0-1, M Crotty 0-1, N Byrne 0-1.
