= 1974 Kilkenny Senior Hurling Championship =

Annual hurling competition season

- Champions: Fenians (4th title)
- Runners-up: Bennettsbridge

The 1974 Kilkenny Senior Hurling Championship was the 80th staging of the Kilkenny Senior Hurling Championship since its establishment by the Kilkenny County Board.

On 20 October 1974, Fenians won the championship after a 0–10 to 0–06 victory over Bennettsbridge in the final. It was their fourth championship title overall and their third title in succession.

== Results ==
Semi-finals

6 October 1974 Semi-final	Bennettsbridge	4-05 - 3-04	Rower-Inistioge	Nowlan Park, Kilkenny
				Referee: J Murphy

6 October 1974 Semi-final	Fenians	3-08 - 2-04	Windgap	Nowlan Park, Kilkenny
				Referee: D Dowling

Final

20 October 1974 Final	Fenians	0-10 - 0-06	Bennettsbridge	Nowlan Park, Kilkenny
	B Fitzpatrick 0-4, B Watson 0-2, J Moriarty 0-1, P Broderick 0-1, P Delaney 0-1, M Garrett 0-1.		W Kennedy 0-4, B O'Brien 0-1, J Kinsella 0-1.	Referee: P Johnston
