= Pat Delaney (Kilkenny hurler) =

Irish hurler (1942-2013)

Personal information
- Native name: Pádraig Ó Dúláinne (Irish)
- Born: 8 February 1942 Johnstown, County Kilkenny, Ireland
- Died: 19 August 2013 (aged 71) Johnstown, County Kilkenny, Ireland
- Occupation: Farmer
- Height: 5 ft 10 in (178 cm)

Sport
- Sport: Hurling
- Position: Centre-forward
Club
- Years: Club
- Fenians
Club titles
- Kilkenny titles: 5
- Leinster titles: 1
- All-Ireland Titles: 0
Inter-county*
Years	County	Apps (scores)
1968–1977	Kilkenny	27 (22–39)
Inter-county titles
- Leinster titles: 6
- All-Irelands: 4
- NHL: 1
- All Stars: 2
- *Inter County team apps and scores correct as of 13:21, 24 August 2013.

Patrick "Pat" Delaney (8 February 1942 – 19 August 2013) was an Irish hurler who played as a centre-forward for the Kilkenny senior team.

Born in Johnstown, County Kilkenny, Delaney first arrived on the inter-county scene at the age of twenty-six when he first linked up with the Kilkenny senior team, making his debut in the 1968 championship. Delaney went on to play a key part for Kilkenny in what has come to be known as one of the greatest teams of all-time, and won four All-Ireland medals, six Leinster medals and one National Hurling League medal. An All-Ireland runner-up on two occasions, Delaney also captained the team to All-Ireland defeat in 1973.

As a member of the Leinster inter-provincial team for six years, Delaney won five consecutiveRailway Cup medals. At club level he won one Leinster medal and five championship medal with Fenians.

Delaney's career tally of 22 goals and 39 points marks him out as Kilkenny's tenth highest championship scorer of all-time.

Throughout his career Keher made 27 championship appearances. His retirement came following the conclusion of the 1977 championship.

Delaney's son, PJ, his brother Shem, and his nephew, J. J. Delaney (Shems son) also won All-Ireland medals with Kilkenny.

== Playing career ==
=== Club ===
Delaney played his club hurling with the newly formed Fenians club in Johnstown. In 1970, he played a key role in helping the club to win its first senior county title. Delaney and the Feninas contested a total of eight senior county finals between 1969 and 1978, with victories also coming in 1972, 1973, 1974 and 1977. Delaney also won a Leinster club title in 1974.

=== Inter-county ===
Delaney made his debut with Kilkenny in the 1968 championship, however, Wexford ended Kilkenny's campaign at the provincial stage.

In 1969, Kilkenny won the provincial final with Delaney winning his first Leinster medal following a 3–9 to 0–16 defeat of Offaly. 7 September 1969 saw Kilkenny face Cork in the All-Ireland decider. Cork got into their stride following an early goal by Charlie McCarthy and led by six points coming up to half time when Kilkenny scored a goal themselves. Kilkenny upped their performance after the interval and ran out winners on a 2–15 to 2–9 scoreline. The victory gave Delaney his first All-Ireland medal.

After surrendering their provincial and All-Ireland crowns to Wexford the following year, Kilkenny began their complete dominance of the provincial championship in 1971. A 6–16 to 3–16 defeat of Wexford gave Delaney his second Leinster medal. On 5 September 1971 Kilkenny faced Tipperary in the All-Ireland final, the first to be broadcast in colour by Telefís Éireann and the only eighty-minute meeting between the two sides. Kilkenny's ever-dependable goalkeeper, Ollie Walsh, had a nightmare of a game in which he conceded five goals, one of which passed through his legs, while that year's Hurler of the Year, "Babs" Keating, played out the closing stages of the game in his bare feet. Kilkenny's Eddie Keher set a new record by scoring 2–11, however, it wasn't enough as Tipperary emerged the victors on a score line of 5–17 to 5–14. In spite of this defeat, Keher was later chosen on the inaugural All-Stars team.

In 1972 Delaney won a third Leinster medal following a thrilling draw and replay victory over Wexford. Once again, Cork provided the opposition in the All-Ireland final on 3 September 1972, a game which is often considered to be one of the classic games of the modern era. Halfway through the second-half Cork were on form and stretched their lead to eight points, however, in a remarkable turnaround, Kilkenny went on to dominate the rest of the game as Cork failed to score again. Delaney collected his second All-Ireland medal following a remarkable 3–24 to 5–11 victory. He later won his first All-Star award.

Delaney was appointed captain of the team in 1973, and he quickly added a fourth Leinster medal to his collection following a 4–22 to 3–15 defeat of Wexford. On 2 September 1973 an injury-ravaged Kilkenny faced Limerick in the All-Ireland decider. A downpour spoiled the game for spectators, however, a Mossie Dowling goal eight minutes after half-time, together with a tour de force by Richie Bennis powered Limerick to a 1–21 to 1–14 victory. In spite of this defeat Delaney later won a second All-Star award.

Wexford were, once again, narrowly defeated by Kilkenny in the 1974 provincial decider. The remarkable 6–13 to 2–24 victory gave Keher a fifth Leinster medal. In a repeat of the previous year Limerick provided the opposition in the subsequent All-Ireland final on 1 September 1974. The Munster champions stormed to a five-point lead in the first eleven minutes, however, a converted penalty by Eddie Keher, supplemented by two further goals gave Kilkenny a 3–19 to 1–13 victory and gave Delaney a third All-Ireland medal.

Kilkenny made it five successive provincial titles in-a-row in 1975. The 2–20 to 2–14 defeat of Wexford gave Delaney his sixth Leinster medal. On 7 September 1975, Delaney lined out in a sixth All-Ireland final, with surprise semi-final winners Galway providing the opposition. Playing with the wind in the first half, Galway found themselves ahead by 0–9 to 1–3 at the interval. Eddie Keher's tally of 2–7 kept Galway at bay giving Kilkenny a 2–22 to 2–10 victory. It was Delaney's fourth All-Ireland medal.

In 1976 Kilkenny looked a sure bet to capture a third successive All-Ireland crown. The season began well with Delaney winning a National Hurling League medal following a 6–14 to 1–14 trouncing of Clare in a replay. Kilkenny's championship ambitions unravelled in spectacular fashion in the subsequent provincial campaign, when a 2–20 to 1–6 trouncing by Wexford dumped Delaney's team out of the championship.

Delaney played his last championship game for Kilkenny on 24 July 1977. The narrow 3–17 to 3–14 defeat by Wexford in the Leinster decider brought Kilkenny's championship campaign to an end.

=== Inter-provincial ===
Delaney also lind out with Leinster in the inter-provincial series of games, and enjoyed much success during a golden era for the province.

After several years of Munster dominance and a losing debut in 1970, Leinster bounced back in 1971. The team went on to secure five consecutive Railway Cup victories over Munster. Delaney played a key role in all of these wins, and ended his career with five Railway Cup medals.

== Trivia ==
Delaney became famous in the 1970s for introducing the Delaney Bounce, a skill that involves the player tapping the sliotar off the ground while charging through a ruck of opponents.

== Honours ==
=== Team ===
Fenians

- Kilkenny Senior Hurling Championship (5): 1970, 1972, 1973, 1974, 1977

Kilkenny

- All-Ireland Senior Hurling Championship (4): 1969, 1972, 1974, 1975
- Leinster Senior Hurling Championship (6): 1969 (c), 1971, 1972, 1973 (c), 1974, 1975
- National Hurling League (1): 1975–76

Leinster

- Railway Cup (5): 1971, 1972, 1973, 1974, 1975

Sporting positions
Preceded by Noel Skehan	Kilkenny Senior Hurling Captain; 1973	Succeeded by Nicky Orr
