= Johnstown, County Kilkenny =

Town in County Kilkenny, Ireland

Johnstown Irish: Baile Sheáin
- Town
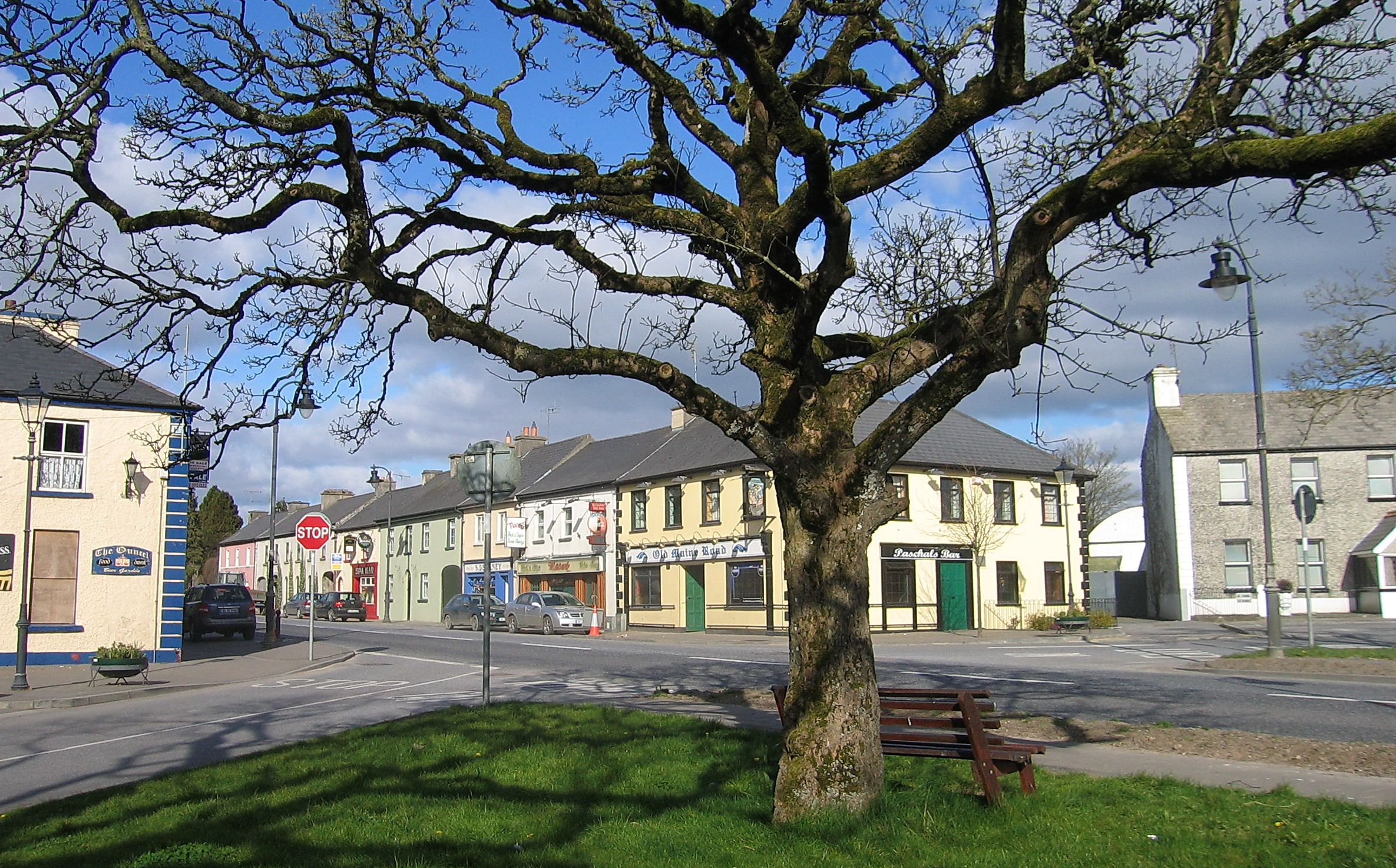
- Johnstown Village Green

- Location in Ireland
- Coordinates: 52°44′57″N 7°33′25″W
- Country: Ireland
- Province: Leinster
- County: Kilkenny
- Elevation: 137 m (449 ft)

Population (2022)
  - Total: 450
- Time zone: UTC+0 (WET)
  - Summer (DST): UTC-1 (IST (WEST))
- Irish Grid Reference: S300664

Johnstown (Irish: Baile Sheáin), historically known as Coorthafooka (Irish: Cúirt an Phúca), is a small town in County Kilkenny, Ireland. Bypassed in December 2008 by the M8, the town lies at the junction of the R639, the R502 and the R435 regional roads. It is the home of the Fenians GAA hurling club. Situated 121 kilometres (75 mi) from Dublin and 131 kilometres (81 mi) from Cork, it lies in the agricultural heartland of the southeast.

The village of Johnstown was once part of the barony of Galmoy and was laid out in the early 1700s by the Hely family of Foulkscourt Castle. The Hely family were descended from Sir John Hely (died 1701), Chief Justice of the Irish Common Pleas.

== Public transport ==
TFI Local link operated by JJ Kavanagh and Sons provides a daily journey each way from Portlaoise to Cashel 828 and Thurles 858. Bus Éireann and Aircoach service between Dublin and Cork ceased to serve Johnstown on 30 June 2012.

== Places of interest ==
Ballyspellan Spa Well is a nearby mineral spa which was visited by Jonathan Swift in 1728. A poem praising its medicinal qualities was penned by Thomas Sheridan and a retort was produced by Swift. In 1806, a Viking Age brooch was found in Ballyspellan and is now on display in the National Museum of Ireland.

Grangefertagh is a 6th Century Round tower situated 3.5 km (2.2 mi) northeast of the village. It is associated with St Ciarán of Saigir and was attacked by the Vikings in 865.

Foulkscourt Castle, is a Norman-era tower house northwest of the village.

== People ==
- J.J Delaney, hurler
- Pat Delaney, hurler
- P.J. Delaney, hurler
- Billy Fitzpatrick, hurler
- Sir John Hely, judge and landowner
- Ger Henderson, hurler
- John Henderson, hurler and inter-county manager
- Pat Henderson, hurler and inter-county manager
- Ethel Colburn Mayne, writer
- Nicky Orr, hurler
- P.J. Ryan, hurler
- Ronan Tynan, tenor and 1984 & 1988 Paralympic athlete

== See also ==
- List of towns and villages in Ireland
