= Fenians Johnstown GAA =

Gaelic games club in County Kilkenny, Ireland

The Fenians
- Na Fíníní
- Founded: 1968
- County: Kilkenny
- Nickname: The Fenians
- Colours
- Grounds: Jim Maher Memorial Park
- Coordinates: 52°45′03.05″N 7°33′31.43″W

Playing kits
Standard colours

Senior Club Championships
	All Ireland	Leinster champions	Kilkenny champions
Hurling:	0	1	5

The Fenians' Hurling Club is a Gaelic Athletic Association club in Johnstown, County Kilkenny, Ireland. The club is exclusively concerned with the game of hurling.

== History ==
Located in the village of Johnstown, close to the Kilkenny–Tipperary border, the Fenians' Hurling Club was founded on 16 March 1968. The new club was an amalgamation of St Finbarr's (Johnstown) and St Kieran's, two competing clubs in the same parish who had previously coalesced at under-21 level.

Success was immediate for the new club, with Fenians claiming the Kilkenny JHC title in 1968, after a 5–08 to 3–04 win over Glenmore in the final. This win also secured senior status. Fenians immediately became a new force in the Kilkenny SHC. The club won five Kilkenny SHC titles, including three-in-a-row, from nine final appearances between 1969 and 1981. Fenians also became the first Kilkenny winners of the Leinster Club SHC title, before defeat by St Finbarr's of Cork in the 1975 All-Ireland Club SHC final.

A very first Kilkenny MAHC title, won in 1988, formed the nucleus for a new senior team over the course of the following decade. Fenians contested further Kilkenny SHC finals in 1993, 1995 and 1998, but faced defeat on each occasion.

== Honours ==
- Leinster Senior Club Hurling Championship (1): 1974
- Kilkenny Senior Hurling Championship (5): 1970, 1972, 1973, 1974, 1977
- Kilkenny Junior Hurling Championship (1): 1968
- Kilkenny Minor A Hurling Championship (1): 1988

== Notable players ==
- J.J. Delaney: All-Ireland SHC–winner (2002, 2003, 2006, 2007, 2008, 2009, 2011, 2012, 2014)
- Pat Delaney: All-Ireland SHC–winner (1969, 1972, 1974, 1975)
- Pat Henderson: All-Ireland SHC–winner (1967, 1969, 1972, 1974, 1975)
