= 2006–07 All-Ireland Junior B Club Hurling Championship =

2nd staging of the All-Ireland Junior B Club Hurling Championship

- Dates: 14 January – 25 March 2007
- Teams: 9
- Sponsor: Killeedy GAA Club
- Champions: Menlo Emmetts (1st title); Ronnie Ferguson (captain)
- Runners-up: Tara Rocks; Brendan Breen (captain)

Tournament statistics
- Matches played: 9
- Goals scored: 23 (2.56 per match)
- Points scored: 144 (16 per match)

The 2006–07 All-Ireland Junior B Club Hurling Championship was the second staging of the All-Ireland Junior B Club Hurling Championship since its establishment by the Killeedy GAA Club in 2005. The championship ran from 14 January to 25 March 2007.

The All-Ireland final was played on 25 March 2007 at Páirc Íde Naofa between Menlo Emmetts and Tara Rocks, in what was their first ever meeting in the final. Menlo Emmetts won the match by 0–16 to 1–12 to claim their first ever All-Ireland title.

== Leinster Junior B Club Hurling Championship ==
=== Leinster final ===
18 February 2007 Final	Tara Rocks	0-16 - 1-05	Mullinavat	Páirc Íde Naofa
		Report

== Munster Junior B Club Hurling Championship ==
=== Munster quarter-final ===
14 January 2007 Quarter-final	Dohenys	2-13 - 2-03	Feakle	Páirc Íde Naofa

=== Munster semi-finals ===
21 January 2007 Semi-final	Dohenys	0-07 - 0-04	Cappamore	Páirc Íde Naofa

28 January 2007 Semi-final	Kiladangan	1-12 - 1-06	Kenmare	Páirc Íde Naofa

=== Munster final ===
11 February 2007 Final	Dohenys	1-14 - 3-07	Kiladangan	Páirc Íde Naofa

== All-Ireland Junior B Club Hurling Championship ==
=== All-Ireland semi-finals ===
25 February 2007 Semi-final	Tara Rocks	8-17 - 0-04	Mullahoran	Páirc Íde Naofa
		Report

4 March 2007 Semi-final	Menlo Emmetts	3-09 - 0-08	Dohenys	Páirc Íde Naofa

=== All-Ireland final ===
11 March 2007 Final	Menlo Emmetts	1-08 - 0-11	Tara Rocks	Páirc Íde Naofa

25 March 2007 Final replay	Menlo Emmetts	0-16 - 1-12	Tara Rocks	Páirc Íde Naofa
