= 2015–16 All-Ireland Junior B Club Hurling Championship =

11th staging of the All-Ireland Junior B Club Hurling Championship

- Sponsor: Killeedy GAA Club
- Champions: Shanballymore (1st title)
- Runners-up: Tynagh-Abbey/Duniry

The 2015–16 All-Ireland Junior B Club Hurling Championship was the 11th staging of the All-Ireland Junior B Club Hurling Championship since its establishment by the Killeedy GAA Club in 2005.

The All-Ireland final was played on 26 June 2016 at Páirc Íde Naofa between Shanballymore and Tynagh-Abbey/Duniry, in what was their first ever meeting in the final. Shanballymore won the match by 0–17 to 1–12 to claim their first ever All-Ireland title.

== Championship statistics ==
=== Miscellaneous ===
- The All-Ireland final was delayed by four months due to a series of objections and counter-objections in relation to an incident in the All-Ireland semi-final between Shanballymore and Barrow Rangers. After losing the match by four points, Shanballymore appealed the result after it emerged that one of the Barrow Rangers players was under 16. Barrow Rangers then lodged a counter-objection after discovering that Shanballymore had also included an under 16 player in their squad. The CCCC disqualified both sides, only for Shanballymore to be reinstated on the grounds that the underage player in their squad hadn't featured in the game.
