= 2016–17 All-Ireland Junior B Club Hurling Championship =

12th staging of the All-Ireland Junior B Club Hurling Championship

- Sponsor: Killeedy GAA Club
- Champions: Whitechurch (1st title)
- Runners-up: Upperchurch–Drombane

The 2016–17 All-Ireland Junior B Club Hurling Championship was the 12th staging of the All-Ireland Junior B Club Hurling Championship since its establishment by the Killeedy GAA Club in 2005.

The All-Ireland final was played on 26 March 2017 at Páirc Íde Naofa between Whitechurch and Upperchurch–Drombane, in what was their second meeting that season after playing each other in the Munster final. Whitechurch won the match by 2–16 to 0–11 to claim their first ever All-Ireland title.
