= 2022–23 All-Ireland Junior B Club Hurling Championship =

17th staging of the All-Ireland Junior B Club Hurling Championship

- Dates: 19 November 2022 – 25 February 2023
- Teams: 15
- Sponsor: Killeedy GAA Club
- Champions: Sarsfields (1st title); Joe Burke (captain); Colm Ward (manager)
- Runners-up: Bruff; Cian Madden (captain); Roger Mulqueen (manager)

Tournament statistics
- Matches played: 15
- Goals scored: 28 (1.87 per match)
- Points scored: 403 (26.87 per match)

The 2022–23 All-Ireland Junior B Club Hurling Championship was the 17th staging of the All-Ireland Junior B Club Hurling Championship since its establishment by the Killeedy GAA Club in 2005. The draw for the provincial championships took place on 28 October 2022. The championship ran from 19 November 2022 to 25 February 2023.

The All-Ireland final was played on 25 February 2023 at Páirc Íde Naofa between Sarsfields from Galway and Bruff from Limerick, in what was their first-ever meeting in the final. Sarsfields won the match by 1-09 to 0-09 to claim their first ever All-Ireland title.

== Leinster Junior B Club Hurling Championship ==
=== Leinster preliminary round ===
19 November 2022 Preliminary round	Rosenallis	2-18 - 0-10	St. Brigid's	Páirc Íde Naofa

=== Leinster quarter-finals ===
19 November 2022 Quarter-final	Aughrim	0-07 - 0-14	St Oliver Plunketts/Eoghan Ruadh	Páirc Íde Naofa

26 November 2022 Quarter-final	Sarsfields	3-20 - 0-08	Glynn-Barntown	Páirc Íde Naofa

26 November 2022 Quarter-final	St. Martin's	2-17 - 0-10	Crinkill	Páirc Íde Naofa

27 November 2022 Quarter-final	Rosenallis	w/o - scr.	Kildalkey	Páirc Íde Naofa

=== Leinster semi-finals ===
21 January 2023 Semi-final	St. Martin's	2-20 - 2-13	St Oliver Plunketts/Eoghan Ruadh	Páirc Íde Naofa

21 January 2023 Semi-final	Sarsfields	0-18 - 0-11	Rosenallis	Páirc Íde Naofa

=== Leinster final ===
29 January 2023 Final	Sarsfields	1-14 - 1-05	St. Martin's	Páirc Íde Naofa

== Munster Junior B Club Hurling Championship ==
=== Munster quarter-finals ===
4 December 2022 Quarter-final	Freemount	0-21 - 0-16	Fourmilewater	Páirc Íde Naofa
	J Ballentyne 0-8, K O'Connor 0-3, J Sheehan 0-2, S Broderick 0-2, T Noonan 0-2, D Curtin 0-1, P Curtin 0-1, S Fehin 0-1, M Lyons 0-1.		C Guiry 0-7, D Meehan 0-3, E Wall 0-2, C Ryan 0-1, D Morrissey 0-1, M O'Gorman 0-1, M Desmond 0-1.

4 December 2022 Quarter-final	Sixmilebridge	3-20 - 1-06	St. Brendan's	Páirc Íde Naofa

=== Munster semi-finals ===
8 January 2023 Semi-final	Thurles Sarsfields	2-22 - 1-13	Freemount	Páirc Íde Naofa
	C Treacy 0-11 (0-8f, 0-2 65), D Bourke 1-3, C McElgunn 1-0, G O’Grady 0-3, D Keogh, A Moloney, P Carroll, C Stapleton, J Lawlor 0-1 each.	Report	T Nunan 0-8 (0-7 f, 0-1 65), R McAulliffe 1-0, J Sheahan 0-2, S Fehin, P Curtin, K O’Connor 0-1 each.

8 January 2023 Semi-final	Bruff	2-08 - 0-10	Sixmilebridge	Páirc Íde Naofa

=== Munster final ===
28 January 2023 Final	Bruff	0-10 - 1-06	Thurles Sarsfields	Páirc Íde Naofa
	D Browne 0-8 (6fs), C Madden and T O'Sullivan 0-1 each.	Report	G O'Grady 1-2, C Treacy 0-3 (3f), R Fogarty 0-1.

== All-Ireland Junior B Club Hurling Championship ==
=== All-Ireland semi-finals ===
12 February 2023 Semi-final	Bruff	0-18 - 1-14 (aet)	St. Martin's	Páirc Íde Naofa
	D Browne 0-11 (10fs), B McNamara and R O'Brien 0-2 each, G Bracken, P Dempsey and G Dempsey 0-1 each.		J Dempsey 0-4, D Quinlan 0-4 (4fs), R Kealy 1-0, C Dooley 0-3, R Dowling, M Shortall and R Shore 0-1 each.

13 February 2023 Semi-final	Sarsfields	2-20 - 1-16	Thurles Sarsfields	Páirc Íde Naofa
	K Wade 0-10, LM Kelly 0-6, J McMahon 1-2, C O’Regan 1-0, S Kelly 0-1, O Maher 0-1, G Kenny-Kelly 0-1.	Report	C Treacy 0-5, B McCormack 1-1, D Bourke 0-3, M Purcell 0-2, A Moloney 0-1, P Stakelum 0-1, C McElgunn 0-1, D Keogh 0-1; G O Grady 0-1.

=== All-Ireland final ===
25 February 2023 Final	Bruff	0-09 - 1-09	Sarsfields	Páirc Íde Naofa
	D Browne 0-5 (1 pen, 4 frees), T O'Sullivan, D Dennehy, C Madden and O Mulqueen 0-1 each	Report	K Wade 0-7 (5 frees), E Dolan 1-0, LM Kelly and S Kelly 0-1 each.
