= Pat Davoren =

Irish hurler

Personal information
- Native name: Pádraig Ó Dábhoireann (Irish)
- Born: 1967 (age 58–59) Ballybrown, County Limerick, Ireland
- Occupation: Sales manager

Sport
- Sport: Hurling
- Position: Right corner-forward
Club
- Years: Club
- Ballybrown
Club titles
- Limerick titles: 2
- Munster titles: 1
- All-Ireland Titles: 0
Inter-county
- Years: County
- 1989-1993: Limerick
Inter-county titles
- Munster titles: 0
- All-Irelands: 0
- NHL: 1
- All Stars: 0

Patrick Davoren (born 1967) is an Irish retired hurler. At club level, he played with Ballybrown and at inter-county level with the Limerick senior hurling team.

== Career ==
Davoren played hurling while at secondary school in Limerick CBS. He was part of the school's senior team that lost to St Finbarr's College in the final of the Dr Harty Cup in 1984.

At club level, Davoren first played for Ballybrown at juvenile and underage levels before progressing to adult level. He won a Limerick SHC medal in 1989 after a 4-10 to 2-09 win over Doon. Davoren later added a Munster Club SHC medal to his collection before lining out in the 1-16 to 0-16 defeat by Ballyhale Shamrocks in the 1990 All-Ireland club final. He collected a second Limerick SHC medal in 1991.

At inter-county level, Davoren first played for Limerick as corner-forward on the minor team that beat Kilkenny to win the All-Ireland MHC title in 1984. He progressed to the under-21 team in 1988.

Davoren joined the senior team in 1989. He made a number of appearances over the course of the following few years and won a National Hurling League medal in 1992.

== Honours ==
Ballybrown

- Munster Senior Club Hurling Championship: 1989
- Limerick Senior Hurling Championship: 1989, 1991

Limerick

- National Hurling League: 1991–92
- All-Ireland Minor Hurling Championship: 1984
- Munster Minor Hurling Championship: 1984
