= 2007–08 All-Ireland Junior B Club Hurling Championship =

3rd staging of the All-Ireland Junior B Club Hurling Championship

- Sponsor: Killeedy GAA Club
- Champions: Ballingarry (1st title)
- Runners-up: Emeralds

The 2007–08 All-Ireland Junior B Club Hurling Championship was the third staging of the All-Ireland Junior B Club Hurling Championship since its establishment by the Killeedy GAA Club in 2005.

The All-Ireland final was played on 9 March 2008 at the Newtownshandrum Grounds between Ballingarry and Emeralds, in what was their first ever meeting in the final. Ballingarry won the match by 0–10 to 0–08 to claim their first ever All-Ireland title.
