= 2010–11 All-Ireland Junior B Club Hurling Championship =

6th staging of the All-Ireland Junior B Club Hurling Championship

- Sponsor: Killeedy GAA Club
- Champions: Ballinderreen (1st title)
- Runners-up: Doneraile

The 2010–11 All-Ireland Junior B Club Hurling Championship was the sixth staging of the All-Ireland Junior B Club Hurling Championship since its establishment by the Killeedy GAA Club in 2005.

The All-Ireland final was played on 20 March 2011 at Páirc Íde Naofa between Ballinderreen and Doneraile, in what was their first ever meeting in the final. Ballinderreen won the match by 2–06 to 0–05 to claim their first ever All-Ireland title.
