= 2023–24 All-Ireland Junior B Club Hurling Championship =

18th staging of the All-Ireland Junior B Club Hurling Championship

- Dates: 25 November 2023 – 2 March 2024
- Teams: 10
- Sponsor: Killeedy GAA Club
- Champions: Monaleen (1st title); Damien Cosgrave (captain); Éamonn O'Connell (manager)
- Runners-up: Drom-Inch

Tournament statistics
- Matches played: 10
- Goals scored: 19 (1.9 per match)
- Points scored: 237 (23.7 per match)
- Top scorer(s): Paul Kennedy (4-31)

The 2023–24 All-Ireland Junior B Club Hurling Championship was the 18th staging of the All-Ireland Junior B Club Hurling Championship since its establishment by the Killeedy GAA Club in 2005. The championship ran from 25 November 2023 to 2 March 2024.

The All-Ireland final was played on 2 March 2024 at Páirc Íde Naofa between Monaleen from Limerick and Drom-Inch from Tipperary, in what was their first ever meeting in the All-Ireland final. Monaleen won the match by 2-11 to 0-09 to claim their first ever All-Ireland title.

Drom-Inch's Paul Kennedy was the championship's top scorer with 4-31.

== Leinster Junior B Club Hurling Championship ==
=== Leinster semi-finals ===
25 November 2023 Semi-final	Birr	1-16 - 0-06	Ardoyne Kickhams	Páirc Íde Naofa

21 January 2024 Semi-final	Ballinasloe	w/o - scr.	The Harps	Páirc Íde Naofa

=== Leinster final ===
3 February 2024 Final	Birr	2-10 - 0-22	Ballinasloe	Páirc Íde Naofa

== Munster Junior B Club Hurling Championship ==
=== Munster quarter-finals ===
25 November 2023 Quarter-final	Rathmore	2-11 - 1-18	Wolfe Tones na Sionna	Páirc Íde Naofa

26 November 2023 Quarter-final	St Oliver Plunketts	1-15 - 0-06	De La Salle	Páirc Íde Naofa
	Cian McCarthy 0-8, Conor McCarthy 0-4, S O'Donovan 1-0, R O'Driscoll 0-2, M Keohane 0-1.		M Breathnach 0-3, T Kearney 0-1, L Hayes 0-1, S Power 0-1.

=== Munster semi-finals ===
20 January 2024 Semi-final	St Oliver Plunketts	2-04 - 3-15	Drom-Inch	Páirc Íde Naofa
	Cian McCarthy 1-2, M Collins 1-0, Conor McCarthy 0-1, M Keohane 0-1.		P Kennedy 1-10, J Lupton 1-0, D Brennan 1-0, J Maher 0-3, M Butler 0-1, D McAllister 0-1.

27 January 2024 Semi-final	Wolfe Tones na Sionna	0-08 - 0-11	Monaleen	Páirc Íde Naofa
	B Loughnane and M O'Sullivan 0-2 each, G Cusack (0-1 free), J Walker (0-1 free), D Ryan and J Roughan (0-1 free) 0-1 each.	Report	M Ivory 0-5 (0-3 frees), B Murnane 0-2, D Crowe, B Mansfield, M Ó Dálaigh (0-1 free) and C O'Dwyer 0-1.

=== Munster final ===
10 February 2024 Final	Drom-Inch	3-08 - 1-13	Monaleen	Páirc Íde Naofa
	P Kennedy (3-7, 0-6f), J Maher 0-1.	Report	M Ivory (0-11, 0-7f, 0-1 65), D Crowe 1-1, H Gleeson 0-1.	Referee: J Mullins (Clare)

== All-Ireland Junior B Club Hurling Championship ==
=== All-Ireland semi-finals ===
17 February 2024 Semi-final	Ballinasloe	0-14 - 0-17 (aet)	Monaleen	Páirc Íde Naofa
	C O’Hanlon 0-11 (0-11 frees), C Keighery 0-2, E Hayes 0-1.	Report	M Ivory 0-15 (0-14 frees), C O Duinn, H Gleeson 0-1 each.

17 February 2024 Semi-final	Drom-Inch	0-17 - 1-06	Birr	Páirc Íde Naofa
	P Kennedy (0-9, 0-4f), D Brennan (0-2); K Butler (0-2), E Walsh (0-1f), J Johnson (0-1); M Butler (0-1), D McAllister (0-1).	Report	D Beale (1-3, 0-2f), B Whelahan (0-2); G Teehan (0-1).

=== All-Ireland final ===
2 March 2024 Final	Monaleen	2-11 - 0-09	Drom-Inch	Páirc Íde Naofa
	B Hayes (2-3), M Ivory (0-8).	Report	P Kennedy (0-5), D Brennan (0-1), K Butler (0-1), J Maher (0-1), P Lupton (0-1).	Referee: J Keenan
