= 2008–09 All-Ireland Junior B Club Hurling Championship =

4th staging of the All-Ireland Junior B Club Hurling Championship

- Sponsor: Killeedy GAA Club
- Champions: Athenry (1st title)
- Runners-up: Bruree

The 2008–09 All-Ireland Junior B Club Hurling Championship was the fourth staging of the All-Ireland Junior B Club Hurling Championship since its establishment by the Killeedy GAA Club in 2005.

The All-Ireland final was played on 29 March 2009 at Páirc Íde Naofa between Athenry and Bruree, in what was their first ever meeting in the final. Athenry won the match by 2–08 to 0–13 to claim their first ever All-Ireland title.
