= 2012–13 All-Ireland Junior B Club Hurling Championship =

8th staging of the All-Ireland Junior B Club Hurling Championship

- Sponsor: Killeedy GAA Club
- Champions: Roscrea (1st title)
- Runners-up: Tubber

The 2012–13 All-Ireland Junior B Club Hurling Championship was the eighth staging of the All-Ireland Junior B Club Hurling Championship since its establishment by the Killeedy GAA Club in 2005.

The All-Ireland final was played on 30 March 2013 at Páirc Íde Naofa between Roscrea and Tubber, in what was their first ever meeting in the final. Roscrea won the match by 0–12 to 1–08 to claim their first ever All-Ireland title.
