= 2018–19 All-Ireland Junior B Club Hurling Championship =

14th staging of the All-Ireland Junior B Club Hurling Championship

- Sponsor: Killeedy GAA Club
- Champions: Oylegate-Glenbrien (1st title)
- Runners-up: Cappamore

The 2018–19 All-Ireland Junior B Club Hurling Championship was the 14th staging of the All-Ireland Junior B Club Hurling Championship since its establishment by the Killeedy GAA Club in 2005.

The All-Ireland final was played on 9 February at Páirc Íde Naofa between Oylegate-Glenbrien and Cappamore, in what was their first ever meeting in the final. Oylegate-Glenbrien won the match by 1–15 to 0–11 to claim their first All-Ireland title.
