= 2009–10 All-Ireland Junior B Club Hurling Championship =

5th staging of the All-Ireland Junior B Club Hurling Championship

- Sponsor: Killeedy GAA Club
- Champions: St. Martin's (1st title)
- Runners-up: St. Mary's/Seán Finns

The 2009–10 All-Ireland Junior B Club Hurling Championship was the fifth staging of the All-Ireland Junior B Club Hurling Championship since its establishment by the Killeedy GAA Club in 2005.

The All-Ireland final was played on 21 March 2010 at Páirc Íde Naofa between St. Martin's and St. Mary's/Seán Finns, in what was their first ever meeting in the final. St. Martin's won the match by 1–14 to 2–09 to claim their first ever All-Ireland title.
