= 2011–12 All-Ireland Junior B Club Hurling Championship =

7th staging of the All-Ireland Junior B Club Hurling Championship

- Sponsor: Killeedy GAA Club
- Champions: Conahy Shamrocks (1st title)
- Runners-up: Clonlara

The 2011–12 All-Ireland Junior B Club Hurling Championship was the seventh staging of the All-Ireland Junior B Club Hurling Championship since its establishment by the Killeedy GAA Club in 2005.

The All-Ireland final was played on 1 April 2011 at Páirc Íde Naofa between Conahy Shamrocks and Clonlara, in what was their first ever meeting in the final. Conahy Sharmocks won the match, after a replay, by 0–11 to 0–09 to claim their first ever All-Ireland title.
