= 2013–14 All-Ireland Junior B Club Hurling Championship =

9th staging of the All-Ireland Junior B Club Hurling Championship

- Sponsor: Killeedy GAA Club
- Champions: Holycross–Ballycahill (1st title)
- Runners-up: Templeglantine

The 2013–14 All-Ireland Junior B Club Hurling Championship was the ninth staging of the All-Ireland Junior B Club Hurling Championship since its establishment by the Killeedy GAA Club in 2005.

The All-Ireland final was played on 23 March 2014 at Páirc Íde Naofa between Holycross–Ballycahill and Templeglantine, in what was their first ever meeting in the final. Holycross–Ballycahill won the match, after a replay, by 2–12 to 1–09 to claim their first ever All-Ireland title.
