= 1999 Limerick Senior Hurling Championship =

Annual hurling competition season

- Dates: 26 June – 3 October 1999
- Teams: 16
- Sponsor: PMG Steel
- Champions: Ahane (18th title); Clement Smith (captain)
- Runners-up: Kilmallock; Maurice Nelligan (captain)
- Relegated: Bruff

Tournament statistics
- Matches played: 38
- Goals scored: 108 (2.84 per match)
- Points scored: 881 (23.18 per match)
- Top scorer(s): Gary Kirby (4–35)

The 1999 Limerick Senior Hurling Championship was the 105th staging of the Limerick Senior Hurling Championship since its establishment by the Limerick County Board in 1887. The championship ran from 26 June to 3 October 1999.

Ahane entered the championship as the defending champions.

The final, a replay, was played on 3 October 1999 at the Gaelic Grounds in Limerick, between Ahane and Kilmallock, in what was their first ever meeting in the final. Ahane won the match by 0–14 to 2–05 to claim their 18th championship title overall and a second title in succession.

Patrickswell's Gary Kirby was the championship's top scorer with 4–35.

== Team changes ==
=== To Championship ===
Promoted from the Limerick Intermediate Hurling Championship

- Croom

=== From Championship ===
Relegated to the Limerick Intermediate Hurling Championship

- Old Christians

== Group 1 ==
=== Group 1 table ===
Knockout stage Relegation stage

Team	Matches				Score			Pts
Team	Pld	W	D	L	For	Against	Diff	Pts
Ahane	3	2	1	0	47	39	8	5
Bruree	3	2	0	1	42	34	8	4
Croom	3	1	1	1	37	33	4	3
Bruff	3	0	0	3	34	54	−20	0

=== Group 1 results ===
27 June 1999 Round 1	Croom	0–13 – 0–13	Ahane	Gaelic Grounds
	G Shanahan 0–5, P Cahill 0–2, B Crofton 0–2, N Riordan 0–1, J Barry 0–1, P Keyes 0–1, H Flavin 0–1.		T Herbert 0–6, O Moran 0–3, J Moran 0–1, A Smith 0–1, J Mescall 0–1, P Smith 0–1.

27 June 1999 Round 1	Bruree	2–13 – 2–05	Bruff	FitzGerald Park
	E Potter 1–6, P Sexton 1–1, S O'Halloran 0–3, P Finn 0–1, S McDonagh 0–1, M Sexton 0–1.		R Hourigan 1–0, M Reale 1–0, L Hogan 0–2, B Callinane 0–1, F O'Dwyer 0–1, P O'Leary 0–1.

10 July 1999 Round 2	Bruree	2–05 – 0–10	Croom	Bruff Grounds
	P Sexton 2–0, S O'Connell 0–2, S Murphy 0–1, P Finn 0–1, E Potter 0–1.		G Shanahan 0–7, P Cahill 0–1, H Flavin 0–1, N O'Riordan 0–1.

11 July 1999 Round 2	Ahane	1–18 – 2–08	Bruff	Fr Hayes Memorial Park
	T Herbert 0–10, J Morrissey 1–0, O Moran 0–3, J Mescall 0–3, J Moran 0–2.		I Hogan 0–6, A Burke 1–0, B Callanan 1–0, P Moloney 0–1, R Hourigan 0–1.

25 July 1999 Round 3	Croom	0–14 – 2–03	Bruff	FitzGerald Park
	M O'Riordan 0–3, G Shanahan 0–3, P Cahill 0–2, H Flavin 0–2, M O'Riordan 0–1, J Barry 0–1, M Lenihan 0–1, K Cregan 0–1.		JA Moran 1–0, P O'Leary 1–0, I Hogan 0–3.

25 July 1999 Round 3	Ahane	0–13 – 0–12	Bruree	Gaelic Grounds
	O Moran 0–4, J Moran 0–2, J Morrissey 0–2, S O'Connor 0–1, C Smith 0–1, M Fitzgerald 0–1, J Mescall 0–1, J O'Grady 0–1.		S O'Connell 0–8, S O'Halloran 0–2, D Sexton 0–1, P Finn 0–1.

== Group 2 ==
=== Group 2 table ===
Knockout stage Relegation stage

Team	Matches				Score			Pts
Team	Pld	W	D	L	For	Against	Diff	Pts
Patrickswell	3	3	0	0	78	33	40	6
Na Piarsaigh	3	2	0	1	52	47	5	4
Monaleen	3	1	0	2	47	59	−12	2
Cappamore	3	0	0	3	36	74	−38	0

=== Group 2 results ===
27 June 1999 Round 1	Patrickswell	4–14 – 0–06	Monaleen	Gaelic Grounds
	G Kirby 2–11, P O'Reilly 1–0, D O'Grady 1–0, A Carmody 0–2, B Foley 0–1.		C O'Reilly 0–4, M Gavin 0–1, J Cormican 0–1.

27 June 1999 Round 1	Na Piarsaigh	1–15 – 1–07	Cappamore	FitzGerald Park
	D Hennessy 1–2, D Quigley 0–4, E Kiely 0–4, S O'Neill 0–3, J Cormack 0–2.		K Hickey 1–0, N Hayes 0–3, D Mulcahy 0–2, P Gleeson 0–1, L Hammersley 0–1.

10 July 1999 Round 2	Monaleen	5–16 – 1–09	Cappamore	Fr Hayes Memorial Park
	C O'Reilly 2–7, M Gavin 2–2, S Mullane 1–1, M Stritch 0–2, A Kitson 0–2, J O'Halloran 0–1, P Moloney 0–1.		N Hayes 0–6, L Hammersley 1–1, S O'Dwyer 0–1, K Hickey 0–1.

11 July 1999 Round 2	Patrickswell	3–18 – 1–10	Na Piarsaigh	Gaelic Grounds
	K Carey 2–1, G Kirby 1–4, A Carmody 0–3, P O'Grady 0–3, J McDermott 0–2, D O'Grady 0–2, P O'Reilly 0–2, B Foley 0–1.		D Hennessy 1–1, D Quigley 0–3, S O'Neill 0–2, F McNamara 0–1, J Cormack 0–1, B Hartnett 0–1, E Kiely 0–1.

24 July 1999 Round 3	Patrickswell	2–19 – 2–08	Cappamore	Fr Hayes Memorial Park
	G Kirby 1–8, K Carey 1–1, D O'Grady 0–3, P O'Grady 0–2, J McDermott 0–2, B Foley 0–2, A Carmody 0–1.		L Hammersley 2–0, M Hayes 0–5, T Mulcahy 0–1, S Coffey 0–1, M Gleeson 0–1.

24 July 1999 Round 3	Na Piarsaigh	0–21 – 0–10	Monaleen	Gaelic Grounds
	E Kiely 0–12, D Hennessy 0–3, J Cormack 0–3, D Quigley 0–1, B Hartnett 0–1, F McNamara 0–1.		M Madden 0–7, S Mullane 0–2, P Moloney 0–1.

== Group 3 ==
=== Group 3 table ===
Knockout stage Relegation stage

Team	Matches				Score			Pts
Team	Pld	W	D	L	For	Against	Diff	Pts
Garryspiillane	3	3	0	0	71	49	32	6
Adare	3	2	0	1	59	49	10	4
Claughaun	3	1	0	2	53	59	−6	2
Ballybrown	3	0	0	3	37	63	−24	0

=== Group 3 results ===
26 June 1999 Round 1	Garryspillane	3–16 – 3–09	Claughaun	Gaelic Grounds
	C Hickey 1–8, F Carroll 1–2, Donie Ryan 1–1, TJ Ryan 0–1, M O'Dea 0–1, R Sampson 0–1, D O'Dea 0–1, P Tobin 0–1.		M Galligan 1–6, L O'Connor 2–0, A Browne 0–2, K Holmes 0–1.

27 June 1999 Round 1	Adare	1–17 – 0–11	Ballybrown	Bruff Grounds
	B Foley 1–2, T Houlihan 0–5, J Foley 0–4, M Foley 0–2, C Fitzgerald 0–2.		L O'Gorman 0–6, S Hayes 0–3, M Doolin 0–3.

11 July 1999 Round 2	Garryspillane	2–16 – 1–06	Ballybrown	Bruff Grounds
	F Carroll 2–8, C Hickey 0–4, M O'Dea 0–1, A Garvey 0–1, T O'Donnell 0–1, Donie Ryan 0–1.		C Coughlan 1–1, G Cross 0–3, P Hartigan 0–2.

11 July 1999 Round 2	Adare	1–14 – 2–08	Claughaun	Bruff Grounds
	M Foley 0–6, D Sheehan 1–0, B Foley 0–2, C Fitzgerald 0–2, P Kennedy 0–1, A O'Rahilly 0–1, J Barrett 0–1, B Heffernan 0–1.		M Galligan 0–7, L O'Connor 1–1, G Ryan 1–0.

24 July 1999 Round 3	Garryspillane	2–18 – 3–13	Adare	FitzGerald Park
	F Carroll 0–7, C Hickey 1–3, P Tobin 1–2, D Ryan 0–2, TJ Ryan 0–2, M O'Dea 0–1, A Garvey 0–1.		M Foley 3–3, C Fitzgerald 0–5, T Healy 0–2, V Foley 0–2, D Sheehan 0–1.

25 July 1999 Round 3	Claughaun	2–15 – 1–14	Ballybrown	Gaelic Grounds
	L O'Connor 2–2, M Galligan 0–7, D Lavery 0–4, T McGarry 0–2.		L O'Gorman 0–6, P Mulqueen 1–1, N Doolin 0–4, C Coughlan 0–1, J Roche 0–1, P McCarthy 0–1.

== Group 4 ==
=== Group 4 table ===
Knockout stage Relegation stage

Team	Matches				Score			Pts
Team	Pld	W	D	L	For	Against	Diff	Pts
Kilmallock	3	3	0	0	69	38	31	6
Doon	3	2	0	1	45	43	2	4
Pallasgreen	3	1	0	2	38	52	−14	2
Killeedy	3	0	0	3	35	54	−19	0

=== Group 4 results ===
27 June 1999 Round 1	Doon	2–09 – 1–09	Pallasgreen	Cappamore Grounds
	D Anderson 0–5, D Stapelton 1–1, G McGrath 1–0, B Crowe 0–2, E Stapleton 0–1.		G O'Connell 0–5,J Cosgrove 1–0, M Kirby 0–2, R Cosgrove 0–1, J Deere 0–1.

27 June 1999 Round 1	Kilmallock	4–14 – 2–04	Killeedy	Gaelic Grounds
	P Connery 2–2, M Houlihan 1–4, J Connery 1–1, P Barrett 0–2, P Tobin 0–2, D Clarke 0–1,		G Kelly 1–0, D Cremin 0–1, J Magner 0–1, R Hayes 0–1.

10 July 1999 Round 2	Doon	2–11 – 2–10	Killeedy	FitzGerald Park
	D Anderson 0–7, J Fox 1–2, G McGrath 1–1, B Treacy 0–1.		R Hayes 0–6, J Hayes 1–0, D Cremin 0–1, J Magner 0–1, P Cremin 0–1, G Kelly 0–1.

11 July 1999 Round 2	Kilmallock	5–13 – 1–12	Pallasgreen	Gaelic Grounds
	P Connery 3–1, M Houlihan 1–3, M Nelligan 0–4, D Barry 1–0, P Tobin 0–3, K O'Dwyer 0–1, P Barrett 0–1.		M Kirby 0–9, J O'Connor 1–0, F Stokes 0–2, J Deere 0–1.

25 July 1999 Round 3	Pallasgreen	0–11 – 0–09	Killeedy	FitzGerald Park
	M Kirby 0–6, F Stokes 0–3, P Roche 0–1, J Hourigan 0–1.		R Cunningham 0–5, D Cremin 0–2, R Hayes 0–1, G Kelly 0–1.

25 July 1999 Round 3	Kilmallock	1–12 – 2–07	Doon	Fr Hayes Memorial Park
	P Connery 1–2, M Houlihan 0–5, P Tobin 0–3, P Hanley 0–1, A Stapleton 0–1.		D Anderson 0–5, D Stapleton 1–1, J Donovan 1–0, J Fox 0–1.

== Relegation stage ==
=== Relegation semi-finals ===
8 August 1999 Semi-final	Cappamore	3–10 – 2–13	Ballybrown	Childers Road
	L Hammersley 3–1, N Hayes 0–6, M Doherty 0–1, M Gleeson 0–1, S Ryan 0–1.		L O'Gorman 0–7, P Kiely 1–0, P Mulqueen 1–0, S Kiely 0–2, P McCarthy 0–2, C Coughlan 0–1, T Hall 0–1.

8 August 1999 Sem-final	Bruff	0–14 – 0–16	Killeedy	Ballyagran Grounds
	R Hourigan 0–10, J Moran 0–2, J Mulqueen 0–2.		D Cremin 0–6, G Kelly 0–5, R Cunningham 0–3, J Cunningham 0–2.

15 August 1999 Semi-final replay	Cappamore	0–07 – 1–14	Ballybrown	Childers Road
	N Hayes 0–4, T Mulcahy 0–1, D O'Dwyer 0–1, M Gleeson 0–1.		L O'Gorman 0–7, C Cughlan 1–1, S Kiely 0–1, P McCarthy 0–3, P Mulqueen 0–1, T Hall 0–1.

=== Relegation final ===
29 August 1999 Final	Cappamore	3–11 – 2–09	Bruff	Fr Hayes Memorial Park
	N Hayes 1–3, L Hammersley 1–1, M Gleeson 1–0, P Ryan 0–2, T Mulcahy 0–2, P Gleeson 0–1, B Coffey 0–1, S O'Dwyer 0–1.		I Hogan 0–7, J Mulqueen 1–1, C Ryan 1–0, JA Moran 0–1.

== Knockout stage ==
=== Quarter-finals ===
15 August 1999 Quarter-final	Ahane	1–16 – 3–08	Doon	Fr Hayes Memorial Park
	T Herbert 0–8, J Morrissey 1–1, J O'Grady 0–2, J Meskell 0–2, P Smith 0–1, J Moran 0–1, M Fitzgerald 0–1.		D Anderson 0–6, B McLoughlin 1–1, D Stapleton 1–0, J O'Donovan 1–0, B Crowe 0–1.

15 August 1999 Quarter-final	Patrickswell	1–11 – 1–10	Adare	FitzGerald Park
	P O'Grady 1–3, G Kirby 0–5, K Carey 0–1, C Carey 0–1, D O'Grady 0–1.		C Fitzgerald 0–7, D Sheehan 1–0, M Foley 0–2, JP Healy 0–1.

15 August 1999 Quarter-final	Kilmallock	1–09 – 1–08	Bruree	Gaelic Grounds
	P Connery 0–3, M Houlihan 0–3, P Tobin 0–2, M Cronin 0–2, P Hanley 0–1, M Nelligan 0–1.		S O'Connell 0–7, D Sexton 1–1.

15 August 1999 Quarter-final	Na Piarsaigh	0–16 – 1–13	Garryspillane	Gaelic Grounds
	E Kiely 0–5, D Quigley 0–4, D Hennessy 0–2, J Cormack 0–2, K Bermingham 0–1, S O'Neill 0–1, B Hartnett 0–1.		F Carroll 0–7, TJ Ryan 1–1, Donie Ryan 0–2, P Tobin 0–2, A Garvey 0–1.

22 August 1999 Quarter-final replay	Na Piarsaigh	1–11 – 0–11	Garryspillane	Gaelic Grounds
	J Cormack 1–0, E Kiely 0–3, K Bermingham 0–2, S O'Neill 0–2, D Hennessy 0–2, D Quigley 0–2.		C Hickey 0–5, F Carroll 0–3, M O'Dea 0–1, A Garvey 0–1, TJ Ryan 0–1.

=== Semi-finals ===
29 August 1999 Semi-final	Kilmallock	3–12 – 1–15	Patrickswell	Gaelic Grounds
	M Houlihan 1–7, M Nelligan 1–0, J Cronin 1–0, D Clarke 0–1, K Duggan 0–1, P Tobin 0–1, P Connery 0–1, P Hanley 0–1.		G Kirby 0–7, K Carey 1–1, D O'Grady 0–4, C Carey 0–1, B Foley 0–1, D Fitzgerald 0–1.

29 August 1999 Semi-final	Ahane	0–16 – 1–13	Na Piarsaigh	Gaelic Grounds
	T Herbert 0–7, J Moran 0–4, S O'Connor 0–3, J Meskell 0–1, J Morrissey 0–1.		E Kiely 0–8, C Minihane 1–0, J Cormack 0–2, D Hennessy 0–2, D Quigley 0–1.

5 September 1999 Semi-final replay	Ahane	4–10 – 2–13	Na Piarsaigh	Gaelic Grounds
	J Moran 0–4, J Morrissey 1–0, N Moran 1–0, B Meskell 1–0, S O'Connor 1–0, T Herbert 0–3, O Moran 0–1, J Meskell 0–1, T Meskell 0–1.		E Kiely 0–8, D Quigley 1–0, C Minihane 1–0, D Hennessy 0–2, B Hartnett 0–2, J Cormack 0–1.

=== Final ===
19 September 1999 Final	Ahane	0–12 – 2–06	Kilmallock	Gaelic Grounds
	T Herbert 0–6, J Moran, S O'Connor 0–2 each; O Moran, B Meskell 0–1 each.		P Tobin and J Cronin 1–1 each; M Houlihan 0–2, D Clarke and P Hanley 0–1 each.

=== Final replay ===
3 October 1999 Final replay	Ahane	0–14 – 2–05	Kilmallock	Gaelic Grounds
	T Herbert 0–6, O Moran 0–3, C Smith, B Meskell, J Moran, J Morrissey and P Smith 0–1 each.		B Hanley and J Cronin 1–0 each, D Clarke, M Houlihan 0–2 each, M Nelligan 0–1.

== Championship statistics ==
=== Top scorers ===
Rank	Player	Club	Tally	Total	Matches	Average
1	Gary Kirby	Patrickswell	4–35	47	5	9.40
2	Turlough Herbert	Ahane	0–46	46	8	5.75
3	Enda Kiely	Na Piarsaigh	0–41	41	7	5.85
4	Frankie Carroll	Garryspillane	3–27	36	5	7.20
5	Mike Houlihan	Kilmallock	3–26	45	7	6.42
6	Niall Hayes	Cappamore	1–27	30	6	5.00
7	Paddy Connery	Kilmallock	6-09	27	7	3.85
8	Colm Hickey	Garryspillane	2–20	26	5	5.20
8	Liam O'Gorman	Ballybrown	0–26	26	4	6.50
10	Liam Hammersley	Cappamore	7-04	25	6	4.16
