= Micheál Mullins =

Irish hurler

Personal information
- Native name: Micheál Ó Maoláin (Irish)
- Born: 2003 (age 22–23) Whitechurch; County Cork, Ireland
- Occupation: Electrician
- Height: 6 ft 1 in (185 cm)

Sport
- Sport: Hurling
- Position: Left wing-back
Clubs*
Years	Club	Apps (scores)
2021-2025 2021 2025-	Whitechurch → Seandún; Glen Rovers	2 (0-03); 10 (3-14)
Club titles
- Cork titles: 1
Inter-county
- Years: County
- 2024-present: Cork
Inter-county titles
- Munster titles: 1
- All-Irelands: 0
- NHL: 1
- All Stars: 0
- * club appearances and scores correct as of 22:31, 12 August 2025.

Micheál Mullins (born 2003) is an Irish hurler. At club level he plays with Glen Rovers and at inter-county level with the Cork senior hurling team.

== Career ==
Mullins first played hurling at juvenile and underage levels with the Whitechurch club. He also lined out as a schoolboy with Gaelcholáiste Mhuire AG in the Harty Cup. Mullins has also earned selection to the Seandún divisional team. He transferred to the Glen Rovers club in 2025.

Mullins first appeared on the inter-county scene as a member of the Cork minor hurling team beaten by Limerick in the 2020 Munster semi-final. He immediately progressed onto the Cork under-20 team and won an All-Ireland U20HC title after coming on as a substitute in the 4–19 to 2–14 defeat of Galway in the 2021 All-Ireland U20 final. Mullins captained the team to a second All-Ireland U20HC title in three seasons in his third and final year with the team in 2023.

Mullins first played for the senior team during the 2024 National Hurling League.

== Personal life ==
His father, Mickey Mullins, was a member of the Cork panel when they won the All-Ireland SHC title in 1990.

== Career statistics ==
=== Club ===
As of 18 October 2026

Team	Year	Cork JAHC	
Team	Year	Apps	Score
Whitechurch	2021	—	
Whitechurch	2022	—	
Whitechurch	2023	—	
Whitechurch	2024	0	0-00
Whitechurch	Total	0	0-00
Team	Year	Cork PSHC	
Team	Year	Apps	Score
Glen Rovers	2025	4	0-07
Glen Rovers	2026	6	3-07
Glen Rovers	Total	10	3-14
Career total		10	3-14

=== Inter-county ===
As of 7 March 2026

Team	Year	National League			Munster		All-Ireland		Total	
Team	Year	Division	Apps	Score	Apps	Score	Apps	Score	Apps	Score
Cork	2024	Division 1A	1	0-00	0	0-00	0	0-00	1	0-00
Cork	2025	Division 1A	2	0-00	0	0-00	0	0-00	2	0-00
Cork	2026	Division 1A	4	0-00	0	0-00	0	0-00	4	0-00
Career total			7	0-00	0	0-00	0	0-00	7	0-00

== Honours ==
Whitechurch

- Cork City Junior A Hurling Championship: 2024

Glen Rovers

- Cork Premier Senior Hurling Championship (1): 2026

Cork

- Munster Senior Hurling Championship: 2025
- National Hurling League: 2025
- All-Ireland Under-20 Hurling Championship: 2021, 2023 (c)
- Munster Under-20 Hurling Championship: 2021, 2023 (c)

Sporting positions
Preceded by Jack Cahalane	Cork under-20 hurling team captain 2023	Succeeded by Darragh O'Sullivan
Achievements
Preceded by Pádraic Moylan	All-Ireland Under-20 Hurling Final winning captain 2023	Succeeded by Dan Bourke
