= Seán O'Connor (hurler) =

Irish hurler

Personal information
- Native name: Seán Ó Conchubhair (Irish)
- Born: 1980 (age 45–46) Castleconnell, County Limerick, Ireland
- Occupation: Construction
- Height: 6 ft 3 in (191 cm)

Sport
- Sport: Hurling
- Position: Left wing-forward
Club
- Years: Club
- Ahane
Inter-county
- Years: County
- 2001-2008: Limerick
Inter-county titles
- Munster titles: 0
- All-Irelands: 0
- NHL: 0
- All Stars: 0

Seán O'Connor (born 1980) is an Irish former hurler. At club level, he played with Ahane and at inter-county level with the Limerick senior hurling team.

== Career ==
At club level, O'Connor first played for Ahane at juvenile and underage levels, before progressing to adult level. In his first few seasons on the Ahane senior team he won back-to-back Limerick SHC medals after respective defeats of Patrickswell in 1998 and Kilmallock in 1999. O'Connor added a third Limerick SHC medal to his collection in 2004, after Ahane's 1–11 to 0–13 win over Garryspillane in the final.

At inter-county level, O'Connor first played for Limerick as a member of the under-21 team. He won a Munster U21HC medal before later lining out in the 1–13 to 0–13 win over Galway in the 2000 All-Ireland under-21 final. He claimed a second successive All-Ireland U21HC medal in 2001.

O'Connor made his senior team debut in 2003. He lined out at left wing-forward when Limerick had a 2–17 to 1–15 defeat by Kilkenny in the 2007 All-Ireland final.

== Honours ==
Ahane

- Limerick Senior Hurling Championship: 1998, 1999, 2004

Limerick

- All-Ireland Under-21 Hurling Championship: 2000, 2001
- Munster Under-21 Hurling Championship: 2000, 2001
