= 2019–20 All-Ireland Junior B Club Hurling Championship =

15th staging of the All-Ireland Junior B Club Hurling Championship

- Sponsor: Killeedy GAA Club
- Champions: Loughrea (1st title)
- Runners-up: St. Vincent's

The 2019–20 All-Ireland Junior B Club Hurling Championship was the 15th staging of the All-Ireland Junior B Club Hurling Championship since its establishment by the Killeedy GAA Club in 2005.

The All-Ireland final was played on 8 February at Páirc Íde Naofa between Loughrea and St. Vincent's, in what was their second meeting that season after already playing each other in the Leinster final. Loughrea won the match by 1–13 to 0–08 to claim their first-ever All-Ireland title.
