= 2014–15 All-Ireland Junior B Club Hurling Championship =

10th staging of the All-Ireland Junior B Club Hurling Championship

- Sponsor: Killeedy GAA Club
- Champions: Doon (1st title)
- Runners-up: Killenaule

The 2014–15 All-Ireland Junior B Club Hurling Championship was the 10th staging of the All-Ireland Junior B Club Hurling Championship since its establishment by the Killeedy GAA Club in 2005.

The All-Ireland final was played on 23 March 2014 at Páirc Íde Naofa between Doon and Killenaule, in what was their second meeting that season after already playing each other in the Munster final. Doon won the match by 0–12 to 0–10 to claim their first ever All-Ireland title.
