= 2025–26 All-Ireland Junior B Club Hurling Championship =

20th staging of the All-Ireland Junior B Club Hurling Championship

- Dates: 10 January – 8 March 2026
- Teams: 12
- Sponsor: Killeedy GAA Club
- Champions: Ballybrown (1st title); Kevin Foster (captain); Seán Healy (captain)
- Runners-up: Tommy Larkin's; Shane Kelly (captain)

The 2025–26 All-Ireland Junior B Club Hurling Championship was the 20th staging of the All-Ireland Junior B Club Hurling Championship since its establishment by the Killeedy GAA Club in 2005. The championship ran from 10 January to 8 March 2026.

The All-Ireland final was played on 8 March 2026 at Páirc Íde Naofa between Ballybrown from Limerick and Tommy Larkin's from Galway, in what was their first ever meeting in the All-Ireland final. Ballybrown won the match by 0–14 to 1–06 to claim their first ever All-Ireland title.

== Leinster Junior B Club Hurling Championship ==
=== Leinster preliminary round ===
10 January 2026 Preliminary round	Naas	v	Loch Mór Dál gCais	Páirc Íde Naofa

=== Leinster quarter-final ===
11 January 2026 Quarter-final	St Rynagh's	3-11 - 1-07	Rathnure St Anne's	Páirc Íde Naofa

18 January 2026 Quarter-final	Naas	3-17 - 2-20 (aet); Penalties: 3-1	Ballinakill	Páirc Íde Naofa

=== Leinster semi-finals ===
24 January 2026 Semi-final	Tommy Larkin's	0-16 - 0-06	Naas	Páirc Íde Naofa

24 January 2026 Semi-final	Glenmore	2-13 - 0-16	St Rynagh's	Páirc Íde Naofa

- Glanmore withdrew from the competition and this match was declared void.

=== Leinster final ===
7 February 2026 Final	Tommy Larkin's	1-16 - 1-09	St Rynagh's	Ballybrown Grounds

== Munster Junior B Club Hurling Championship ==
=== Munster quarter-final ===
10 January 2026 Quarter-final	Ballybrown	2-19 - 0-06	Ballyduff Upper	Páirc Íde Naofa
	R O'Brien 1-3 (1-0 free), P O'Neill 1-1, B O'Connor (1 free), E Keyes 0-4 each, P O'Rourke, J Behan 0-2 each, S Healy, N Quane, J Smith 0-1 each.	Report	C Murphy 0-3 (3 frees), B Bourke, O Hannigan, A Power (free) 0-1 each.

=== Munster semi-finals ===
17 January 2026 Semi-final	Silvermines	1-20 - 0-11	Ballyclough	Páirc Íde Naofa
	R Cunneen 0-7, G Leamy 1-2, E Seymour 0-2, O Quirke 0-2, W Keogh 0-2, D Keogh 0-2, N Curran 0-1, S Spillane 0-1, P Steed 0-1.	Report	T O'Neill 0-3, J Moynihan 0-3, A Finnegan 0-2, D Ludgate 0-2, S O'Leary 0-1.

17 January 2026 Semi-final	Ballybrown	0-18 - 1-06	Inagh-Kilnamona	Páirc Íde Naofa
	E Keyes, B O’Connor (0-3 frees) 0-5 each, S Healy, P O’Neill, L O’Reilly 0-2 each, M Doolan, P O’Rourke 0-1 each.	Report	J Lyons 1-4 (0-3 frees), D McInerney, P O’Looney 0-1 each.

=== Munster final ===
7 February 2026 Final	Ballybrown	0-18 - 0-15	Silvermines	Páirc Íde Naofa
	A Cliffe 0-9.	Report

== All-Ireland Junior B Club Hurling Championship ==
=== All-Ireland semi-finals ===
22 February 2026 Semi-final	Tommy Larkin's	2-10 - 2-09	Silvermines	Páirc Íde Naofa
	E Fahy 1-6 (0-5 frees, 0-1 pen); J Dervan 1-0; A Page 0-2; D Starr (free), D Keane 0-1 each	Report	D Shanahan frees, O Quirke (1 free) 0-3 each; D Ryan, S Ryan-Prendiville 1-0 each; R Cunneen (free), W Keogh, B Leamy 0-1 each.

22 February 2026 Semi-final	Ballybrown	1-13 - 2-07	St Rynagh's	Páirc Íde Naofa

=== All-Ireland final ===
8 March 2026 Final	Ballybrown	0-14 - 1-05	Tommy Larkin's	Páirc Íde Naofa
	A Cliffe 0-8 (5f); B O’Connor 0-3; R O’Brien, E Keyes, M Doolan 0-1 each.	Report	D Hickey 1-2 (1-1 frees); E Fahy 0-2 (both frees); S O’Grady, A Page 0-1 each.	Referee: J Mullins (Clare)
