= 2021–22 All-Ireland Junior B Club Hurling Championship =

16th staging of the All-Ireland Junior B Club Hurling Championship

- Sponsor: Killeedy GAA Club
- Champions: Clonoulty–Rossmore (1st title); Martin Sadlier (captain)
- Runners-up: Cappataggle; Michael Broderick (captain)

The 2021–22 All-Ireland Junior B Club Hurling Championship was the 16th staging of the All-Ireland Junior B Club Hurling Championship since its establishment by the Killeedy GAA Club in 2005. It was the first championship to be completed in two years as the 2020–21 Championship was cancelled due to the COVID-19 pandemic.

The All-Ireland final was played on 2 April 2022 at Páirc Íde Naofa between Clonoulty-Rossmore and Cappataggle, in what was their first ever meeting in the final. Clonoulty-Rossmore won the match, after a replay, by 3–15 to 1–18 to claim their first ever All-Ireland title.

== All-Ireland Junior B Club Hurling Championship ==
=== All-Ireland semi-finals ===
26 March 2022 Semi-final	Clonoulty-Rossmore	2-16 - 2-15	Blackwater	Páirc Íde Naofa
	J Devane 0-13 (12fs), N Kearns 1-2, M Ryan 1-0, O Fryday 0-1.	Report	D O’Brien 1-4 (3fs), C Sutton 1-1, K Fikentscher 0-4, J Dooley 0-3, S Walsh 0-2, K Sutton 0-1.	Referee: J Murphy (Limerick)

27 March 2022 Semi-final	Cappataggle	1-21 - 0-18	Scariff	Páirc Íde Naofa

=== All-Ireland final ===
2 April 2022 Final	Clonoulty-Rossmore	3-11 - 2-14	Cappataggle	Páirc Íde Naofa
	J Devane 1-6 (5fs), C Ryan 1-1, N Kearns 1-1, G Mockler 0-2, P Coen 0-1.	Report	D Kelly 2-1, C Bowes 0-6 (fs), J Coughlan 0-3, D Reddan 0-1, L Coughlan 0-1, G Maher 0-1 (f), J Stancard 0-1.	Referee: E Stapleton (Limerick)

9 April 2022 Final replay	Clonoulty-Rossmore	3-15 - 1-18	Cappataggle	Páirc Íde Naofa
	J Devane 1-6 (5fs), N Kearns 1-3, C Ryan 1-1, K Carroll 0-2, M Sadlier 0-1 (f), O Fryday 0-1, P Coen 0-1.	Report	D Reddan 0-12 (8fs), E Malone 1-0 (sideline), M Broderick 0-2, J Stancard 0-2, C Delaney 0-1, D Kelly 0-1.	Referee: J Murphy (Limerick)
