= 2024–25 All-Ireland Junior B Club Hurling Championship =

19th staging of the All-Ireland Junior B Club Hurling Championship

- Dates: 30 November 2024 – 1 March 2025
- Teams: 10
- Sponsor: Killeedy GAA Club
- Champions: Kildimo-Pallaskenry (1st title); Rodger Ryan (captain)
- Runners-up: Cappawhite; Tommy Coughlan (captain)

Tournament statistics
- Matches played: 11
- Goals scored: 33 (3 per match)
- Points scored: 292 (26.55 per match)

The 2024–25 All-Ireland Junior B Club Hurling Championship was the 19th staging of the All-Ireland Junior B Club Hurling Championship since its establishment by the Killeedy GAA Club in 2005. The championship ran from 30 November 2024 to 1 March 2025.

The All-Ireland final was played on 1 March 2025 at Páirc Íde Naofa between Kildimo-Pallaskenry from Limerick and Cappawhite from Tipperary, in what was their first ever meeting in the All-Ireland final. Kildimo-Pallaskenry won the match by 2-13 to 0-10 to claim their first ever All-Ireland title.

== Leinster Junior B Club Hurling Championship ==
=== Leinster quarter-final ===
30 November 2024 Quarter-final	Threecastles	6-24 - 1-09	Belfast Saints	Páirc Íde Naofa
		Report

=== Leinster semi-finals ===
29 January 2025 Semi-final	Clough–Ballacolla	2-12 - 3-16	Threecastles	Páirc Íde Naofa

1 February 2025 Semi-final	Killimordaly	0-15 - 2-12	Kilrush–Askamore	Páirc Íde Naofa

=== Leinster final ===
8 February 2025 Final	Threecastles	1-14 - 0-14	Kilrush–Askamore	Páirc Íde Naofa

== Munster Junior B Club Hurling Championship ==
=== Munster quarter-final ===
1 December 2024 Quarter-final	Buttevant	2-16 - 2-13	Lismore	Páirc Íde Naofa
		Report

=== Munster semi-finals ===
25 January 2025 Semi-final	Cappawhite	1-15 - 2-09	Buttevant	Páirc Íde Naofa
		Report

1 February 2025 Semi-final	Tulla	1-12 - 1-13	Kildimo–Pallaskenry	Páirc Íde Naofa
		Report

=== Munster final ===
8 February 2025 Final	Cappawhite	1-13 - 3-08	Kildimo–Pallaskenry	Páirc Íde Naofa
	A Barry (1-10, 0-9f, 0-1 '65), R Dunne (0-1); N Clancy (0-1), M O'Neill (0-1).	Report	R Ryan (3-0), A O'Donovan (0-7f), C Downes (0-1).

== All-Ireland Junior B Club Hurling Championship ==
=== All-Ireland semi-finals ===
22 February 2025 Semi-final	Kildimo-Pallaskenry	0-17 - 1-11	Kilrush Askamore	Páirc Íde Naofa

22 February 2025 Semi-final	Threecastles	0-15 - 2-11	Cappawhite	Páirc Íde Naofa

=== All-Ireland final ===
1 March 2025 Final	Kildimo-Pallaskenry	2-13 - 0-10	Cappawhite	Páirc Íde Naofa
	C Downes (2-2), A O'Donovan (0-8f), C McMahon (0-1); R Ryan (0-1), L Guinane (0-1).	Report	A Barry (0-8, 0-7f), E Ryan (0-1), C Doody (0-1).
