= Clem Smith =

Clem Smith may refer to:

- Clem Smith (footballer) (born 1996), Australian rules footballer
- Clem Smith (politician), member of the Missouri House of Representatives
- Clem Smith (hurler) (born 1975), Irish hurler

== See also ==
- Clement Smith (disambiguation)
