= 2026 Cork Junior A Hurling Championship =

Annual hurling competition season

- Dates: 31 October – November 2026
- Teams: 7
- Sponsor: Co-Op Superstores

Tournament statistics
- Matches played: 5
- Goals scored: 20 (4 per match)
- Points scored: 158 (31.6 per match)
- Top scorer: Ben Geary (2–16)

The 2026 Cork Junior A Hurling Championship is the 129th staging of the Cork Junior A Hurling Championship since its establishment by the Cork County Board in 1895. The championship is scheduled to run from 31 October to November 2026.

== Qualification ==
Division	Championship	Champions
Avondhu	North Cork Junior A Hurling Championship	Dromina
Carbery	Carbery Junior A Hurling Championship	Diarmuid Ó Mathúna's
Carrigdhoun	South East Junior A Hurling Championship	Valley Rovers
Duhallow	Duhallow Junior A Hurling Championship	Newmarket
Imokilly	East Cork Junior A Hurling Championship	Killeagh
Muskerry	Mid Cork Junior A Hurling Championship	Donoughmore
Seandún	Seandún Junior A Hurling Championship	Whitechurch

== Fixtures and results ==
=== Bracket ===
Quarter-Finals
Whitechurch (Seandún)	4–18
Diarmuid Ó Mathúna's (Carbery)	6–20
Killeagh (Imokilly)	2–19
Newmarket (Duhallow)	2–19
Dromina (Avondhu)	0–13
Valley Rovers (Carrigdhoun)	0–16

Semi-Finals
Diarmuid Ó Mathúna's (Carbery)	1–10
Donoughmore (Muskerry)	1–12
Killeagh (Imokilly)	2–20
Valley Rovers (Carrigdhoun)	2–11

Final
Donoughmore (Muskerry)
Killeagh (Imokilly)

=== Quarter-finals ===
31 October 2026 Quarter-final	Whitechurch (Seandún)	4-18 - 6-20	Diarmuid Ó Mathúna's (Carbery)	Páirc Uí Rinn
	J Hegarty 1-6 (0-4 f), J Kelleher 1-2, R O'Connell, D O'Sullivan 1-1 each, D Kelleher, C Egan 0-3 each, M Callanan, D O'Connell 0-1 each.	Report	J Lucey 3-3, C O'Donovan 1-9 (0-7 f), K O'Donovan 1-4, J Hurley 1-0, M Draper, G O'Donovan, J Fleming, P Crowley (sl) 0-1 each.	Referee: J Smiddy (Castlemartyr)

1 November 2026 Quarter-final	Dromina (Avondhu)	0-13 - 0-16	Valley Rovers (Carrigdhoun)	Whitechurch Grounds
	D Jones 0-7 (0-5 f, 0-1 65).	Report	E Galgey 0-8 (0-7 f), E O'Reilly 0-3.

1 November 2026 Quarter-final	Killeagh (Imokilly)	2-19 - 2-19; Penalties: 4-2	Newmarket (Duhallow)	Grenagh Grounds
	B Geary 2-6 (0-4 f), S Walsh (0-4), A Leahy (0-3), C Deane (0-2), D Motherway (0-2), S Meade (0-1), C Leahy (0-1).	Report	D Hannon 0-9, H O'Connor 1-2, B O'Connor 1-2.

=== Semi-finals ===
15 November 2026 Semi-final	Donoughmore (Muskerry)	1-12 - 1-10	Diarmuid Ó Mathúna's (Carbery)	Páirc Uí Rinn
	P Murphy 1-3, C O’Callaghan 0-3 (0-2f), A Dinan, D O’Connell 0-2 each, L O’Sullivan, D Holland 0-1 each.	Report	C O’Donovan 0-7f, G O’Donovan 1-0, R Lucey, K O’Donovan, J Lucey 0-1 each.

15 November 2026 Semi-final	Killeagh (Imokilly)	2-20 - 2-11	Valley Rovers (Carrigdhoun)	Clonmult Memorial Park
	B Geary 0-10 (0-9 f), C Deane 1-3, R Long 1-0, S Walsh 0-3, A Leahy 0-2, Colm Leahy, D Motherway 0-1 each.	Report	E Galgey 0-5 f, S O’Regan (1-0 f), C Kilduff 1-0 each, C Taheny 0-3, E O’Reilly 0-2, D O’Shea 0-1.

=== Final ===
Final	Donoughmore (Muskerry)	v	Killeagh (Imokilly)

== Championship statistics ==
=== Top scorers ===
Rank	Player	Club	Tally	Total	Matches	Average
1	Ben Geary	Killeagh	2-16	22	2	11.00
2	Caolan O'Donovan	Diarmuid Ó Mathúna's	1-16	19	2	9.50
3	Jamie Lucey	Diarmuid Ó Mathúna's	3-04	13	2	6.50
3	Eoghan Galgey	Valley Rovers	0-13	13	2	6.50
5	Jamie Hegarty	Whitechurch	1-06	9	1	9.00
5	Donal Hannon	Newmarket	0-09	9	1	9.00
7	Kevin O'Donovan	Diarmuid Ó Mathúna's	1-05	8	2	4.00
7	Cormac Deane	Killeagh	1-05	8	2	4.00
9	Davie Jones	Dromina	0-07	7	1	7.00
10	Paddy Murphy	Donoughmore	1-03	6	1	6.00
10	Seán walsh	Killeagh	0-06	6	2	3.00
