= Ollie O'Connor =

Ollie O'Connor may refer to:

- Ollie O'Connor (Limerick hurler) (born 1959), Irish hurler
- Ollie O'Connor (Kilkenny hurler) (born 1975), Irish hurler
