= Thomas Simcocks =

Thomas Simcocks was an Anglican priest in Ireland.

Simcocks was educated at Trinity College, Dublin. He was Dean of Cloyne from 1714 to 1718 when he became the incumbent at Whitechurch, County Cork.
