= Ollie O'Connor (Limerick hurler) =

Irish hurler

Personal information
- Nationality: Irish
- Born: April 2, 1959 (age 65)

Sport
- Sport: Hurling

Ollie O'Connor (born 2 April 1959) was an Irish hurler who played for Limerick Senior Championship club Ballybrown. He played for the Limerick senior hurling team for a number of years, during which time he usually lined out as a right corner-forward.

== Honours ==
Ballybrown

- Munster Senior Club Hurling Championship (1): 1989
- Limerick Senior Hurling Championship (2): 1989, 1991

Limerick

- Munster Senior Hurling Championship (2): 1980, 1981

Munster

- Railway Cup (3): 1981, 1984, 1985
