= Joe O'Connor (Limerick hurler) =

Limerick hurler

Personal information
- Native name: Seosamh Ó Conchubhair (Irish)
- Born: Ballybrown, County Limerick
- Occupation: Electrician
- Height: 5 ft 11 in (180 cm)

Sport
- Sport: Hurling
- Position: Corner-back
Club
- Years: Club
- 1980s–2000s: Ballybrown
Club titles
- Limerick titles: 2
- Munster titles: 1
- All-Ireland Titles: 0
Inter-county
- Years: County
- 1980s–1990s: Limerick
Inter-county titles
- Munster titles: 1
- All-Irelands: 0
- NHL: 1
- All Stars: 0

Joe O'Connor (born 1967 in Ballybrown, County Limerick) is an Irish former hurler who played for his local club Ballybrown and at senior level for the Limerick county team in the 1980s and 1990s.
