= Niall Breen =

Niall Breen may refer to:

- Niall Breen (racing driver) (born 1986), Irish racing driver
- Niall Breen (hurler) (born 1989), Irish hurler
