= Seandún Junior A Hurling Championship =

Annual hurling competition

- Current season or competition: 2026 Seandún Junior A Hurling Championship
- Irish: Craobh Iomána Sóisear A Seandún
- Code: Hurling
- Founded: 1926; 100 years ago
- Region: Seandún (GAA)
- No. of teams: 8
- Title holders: Whitechurch (3rd title)
- Most titles: Glen Rovers (17 titles)
- Sponsors: AOS Security
- Official website: Seandún GAA

The Seandún Junior A Hurling Championship (known for sponsorship reasons as the AOS Security Seandún Junior A Hurling Championship and abbreviated to the Seandún JAHC) is an annual club hurling competition organised by the Seandún Board of the Gaelic Athletic Association and contested by junior clubs in the city of Cork, Ireland.

Introduced in 1926 as the City Junior Hurling Championship, it was initially a straight knockout tournament. The competition went through a number of format changes since then, including the introduction of a back-door or second chance for beaten teams. The competition has since added a round-robin group stage.

In its current format, the Seandún Junior Championship begins with a group stage in late summer. The 8 participating teams are divided into two groups of four and play each other in a round-robin system. The two top-ranking teams in each group proceed to the knockout phase that culminates with the final. The winner qualifies for the subsequent Cork Junior A Hurling Championship.

The competition has been won by 17 teams, 12 of which have won it more than once. Glen Rovers are the most successful team in the tournament's history, having won it 17 times. Whitechurch are the 2026 title holders, having beaten Na Piarsaigh by 2–17 to 2–16 in the 2026 final.

== Format ==
=== Group stage ===
The 8 teams are divided into two groups of four. Over the course of the group stage, each team plays once against the others in the group, resulting in each team being guaranteed at least three games. Two points are awarded for a win, one for a draw and zero for a loss. The teams are ranked in the group stage table by points gained, then scoring difference and then their head-to-head record. The top two teams in each group qualify for the knockout stage.

=== Knockout stage ===
Semi-finals: The two group winners and two group runners-up contest this round. The winners from these two games advance to the final.

Final: The two semi-final winners contest the final. The winning team are declared champions.

== Teams ==
=== 2026 teams ===
The 8 teams competing in the 2026 Cork City Junior A Hurling Championship include:

| Team | Location | Colours | Position in 2026 | In championship since | Championship Titles | Last Championship Title |
|---|---|---|---|---|---|---|
| Blackrock | Blackrock | Green and yellow | Group stage | ? | 7 | 2013 |
| Douglas | Douglas | Green, black and white hoops | Group stage | 2025 | 3 | 1984 |
| Glen Rovers | Blackpool | Green, black and yellow | Group stage | ? | 17 | 2008 |
| Na Piarsaigh | Fair Hill | Yellow and black | Runners-up | ? | 6 | 1997 |
| Passage West | Passage West | Green and white | Semi-finals | ? | 1 | 2021 |
| St Vincent's | Knocknaheeny | Green and white | Semi-finals | ? | 3 | 1957 |
| Whitechurch | Whitechurch | Purple and yellow | Champions | 2017 | 3 | 2026 |
| White's Cross | Ballinvriskig | Green and white | Group stage | 2019 | 0 | — |

== Sponsorship ==
AOS Security became the title sponsor of the championship in February 2023. Previous sponsors include Silver Springs Moran Hotel and BCE Consulting Engineers.

== Qualification for subsequent competitions ==
The Seandún Junior A Hurling Championship winners qualify for the subsequent Cork Junior A Hurling Championship.

== Roll of honour ==
=== By club ===
| # | Club | Titles | Runners-up | Championships won | Championships runners-up |
|---|---|---|---|---|---|
| 1 | Glen Rovers | 17 | 13 | 1929, 1930, 1934, 1939, 1943, 1944, 1945, 1950, 1958, 1975, 1976, 1987, 1992, 1993, 1996, 2001, 2008 | 1938, 1942, 1946, 1947, 1948, 1956, 1957, 1977, 1980, 1984, 1986, 2007, 2009 |
| 2 | Nemo Rangers | 15 | 5 | 1960, 1961, 1962, 1963, 1964, 1991, 1994, 1998, 2000, 2007, 2009, 2017, 2018, 2022, 2023 | 1989, 1993, 2013, 2014, 2015 |
| 3 | St Finbarr's | 12 | 6 | 1927, 1940, 1941, 1942, 1955, 1956, 1972, 1981, 1985, 1990, 2004, 2014 | 1945, 1964, 1965, 1970, 1982, 1992 |
| 4 | Mayfield | 11 | 10 | 1935, 1967, 1969, 1971, 1978, 1999, 2002, 2005, 2010, 2011, 2016 | 1928, 1933, 1939, 1941, 1966, 1975, 1998, 2001, 2006, 2012 |
| 5 | Brian Dillons | 10 | 15 | 1936, 1937, 1938, 1965, 1968, 2006, 2012, 2015, 2019, 2020 | 1931, 1935, 1943, 1944, 1950, 1954, 1959, 2004, 2005, 2010, 2011, 2016, 2017, 2018, 2022 |
| 6 | Blackrock | 7 | 5 | 1931, 1947, 1949, 1970, 1973, 2003, 2013 | 1936, 1958, 1963, 1976, 1999 |
| 7 | Na Piarsaigh | 6 | 9 | 1946, 1953, 1979, 1989, 1995, 1997 | 1952, 1967, 1983, 1985, 1988, 1994, 1996, 2025, 2026 |
| 8 | Delaney Rovers | 5 | 5 | 1974, 1980, 1982, 1986, 1988 | 1968, 1971, 1972, 1987, 1991 |
| 9 | Lough Rovers | 4 | 7 | 1932, 1948, 1952, 1959 | 1930, 1937, 1949, 1951, 1955, 1962, 1969 |
| 10 | Douglas | 3 | 5 | 1966, 1983, 1984 | 1960, 1978, 1979, 1981, 2008 |
| 10 | Whitechurch | 3 | 3 | 2024, 2025, 2026 | 1997, 2019, 2023 |
| 10 | St Vincent's | 3 | 2 | 1951, 1954, 1957 | 1953, 2021 |
| 13 | Passage West | 1 | 6 | 2021 | 1990, 1995, 2000, 2002, 2003, 2020 |
| 13 | Bishopstown | 1 | 2 | 1977 | 1961, 1973 |
| 13 | College Rovers | 1 | 0 | 1926 | — |
| 13 | St Anne's | 1 | 0 | 1928 | — |
| 13 | St Mary's | 1 | 0 | 1933 | — |
| 18 | Commons Road | 0 | 1 | — | 1927 |
| 18 | Rochestown | 0 | 1 | — | 1974 |

=== Notes ===
- Runners-up unknown — 1926, 1929, 1932, 1934, 1940

== List of finals ==
| Year | Winners | | Runners-Up | |
| Year | Club | Score | Club | Score |
|---|---|---|---|---|
| 2026 | Whitechurch | 2–17 | Na Piarsaigh | 2–16 |
| 2025 | Whitechurch | 1–13 | Na Piarsaigh | 0–15 |
| 2024 | Whitechurch | 0–25 | Passage West | 3–14 |
| 2023 | Nemo Rangers | 3–17 | Whitechurch | 1–10 |
| 2022 | Nemo Rangers | 0–13 | Brian Dillons | 1–06 |
| 2021 | Passage West | 6–10 | St Vincent’s | 1–10 |
| 2020 | Brian Dillons | 2–16 | Passage West | 1–17 |
| 2019 | Brian Dillons | 0–21 | Whitechurch | 0–12 |
| 2018 | Nemo Rangers | 2–17 | Brian Dillons | 1–17 |
| 2017 | Nemo Rangers | 2–17 | Brian Dillons | 0–17 |
| 2016 | Mayfield | 0–15 | Brian Dillons | 1–11 |
| 2015 | Brian Dillons | 2–20 (aet) | Nemo Rangers | 2–15 |
| 2014 | St Finbarr's | 3–11 | Nemo Rangers | 2–11 |
| 2013 | Blackrock | 3–12 | Nemo Rangers | 4–08 |
| 2012 | Brian Dillons | 1–14 | Mayfield | 1–10 |
| 2011 | Mayfield | 0–19 | Brian Dillons | 1–10 |
| 2010 | Mayfield | 4–13 | Brian Dillons | 2–12 |
| 2009 | Nemo Rangers | 2–12 | Glen Rovers | 1–14 |
| 2008 | Glen Rovers | 2–13 | Douglas | 0–10 |
| 2007 | Nemo Rangers | 0–23 | Glen Rovers | 1–09 |
| 2006 | Brian Dillons | 1–13 | Mayfield | 0–11 |
| 2005 | Mayfield | 1–13 | Brian Dillons | 1–10 |
| 2004 | St Finbarr's | 4–06 | Brian Dillons | 2–11 |
| 2003 | Blackrock | 2–18 | Passage West | 1–13 |
| 2002 | Mayfield | 2–10 | Passage West | 0–09 |
| 2001 | Glen Rovers | 2–11 | Mayfield | 2–07 |
| 2000 | Nemo Rangers | 2–11 | Passage West | 0–12 |
| 1999 | Mayfield | 0-13 | Blackrock | 1-08 |
| 1998 | Nemo Rangers | 1-17 | Mayfield | 1-09 |
| 1997 | Na Piarsaigh | 1-10 | Whitechurch | 0-12 |
| 1996 | Glen Rovers | 1-16 | Na Piarsaigh | 2-12 |
| 1995 | Na Piarsaigh | 1-10 | Passage West | 1-05 |
| 1994 | Nemo Rangers | 1-18 | Na Piarsaigh | 2-13 |
| 1993 | Glen Rovers | 3-08 | Nemo Rangers | 1-11 |
| 1992 | Glen Rovers | 0-09 | St Finbarr's | 0-06 |
| 1991 | Nemo Rangers | 2-12 | Delaney Rovers | 2-06 |
| 1990 | St Finbarr's | 3-08 | Passage West | 1-09 |
| 1989 | Na Piarsaigh | 1-09 | Nemo Rangers | 1-08 |
| 1988 | Delaney Rovers | 2-13 | Na Piarsaigh | 1-08 |
| 1987 | Glen Rovers | 1-10 | Delaney Rovers | 0-12 |
| 1986 | Delaney Rovers | 3-16 | Glen Rovers | 2-09 |
| 1985 | St Finbarr's | 3-09 | Na Piarsaigh | 2-08 |
| 1984 | Douglas | 2-15 | Glen Rovers | 2-04 |
| 1983 | Douglas | 4-13 | Na Piarsaigh | 3-10 |
| 1982 | Delaney Rovers | 1-10, 1-14, 1-17 | St Finbarr's | 2-07, 3-08, 2-08 |
| 1981 | St Finbarr's | 1-12 | Douglas | 1-09 |
| 1980 | Delaney Rovers | 4-07 | Glen Rovers | 0-06 |
| 1979 | Na Piarsaigh | 1-12 | Douglas | 1-08 |
| 1978 | Mayfield | 3-09 | Douglas | 2-05 |
| 1977 | Bishopstown | 1-09 | Glen Rovers | 1-06 |
| 1976 | Glen Rovers | 1-15 | Blackrock | 2-06 |
| 1975 | Glen Rovers | 3-11 | Mayfield | 2-10 |
| 1974 | Delaney Rovers | 2-13 | Rochestown | 4-04 |
| 1973 | Blackrock | 4-10 | Bishopstown | 1-03 |
| 1972 | St Finbarr's | 3-09 | Delaney Rovers | 3-08 |
| 1971 | Mayfield | 2-09 | Delaney Rovers | 1-08 |
| 1970 | Blackrock | 2-10 | St Finbarr's | 3-02 |
| 1969 | Mayfield | 3-14 | Lough Rovers | 3-04 |
| 1968 | Brian Dillons | 3-09 | Delaney Rovers | 2-02 |
| 1967 | Mayfield | 6-07 | Na Piarsaigh | 0-05 |
| 1966 | Douglas | 2-06 | Mayfield | 1-07 |
| 1965 | Brian Dillons | 5-07 | St Finbarr's | 5-03 |
| 1964 | Nemo Rangers | 2-04 | St Finbarr's | 2-03 |
| 1963 | Nemo Rangers | 5-08 | Blackrock | 3-04 |
| 1962 | Nemo Rangers | 2-10 | Lough Rovers | 2-05 |
| 1961 | Nemo Rangers | | Bishopstown | |
| 1960 | Nemo Rangers | 6-17 | Douglas | 2-03 |
| 1959 | Lough Rovers | 6-09 | Brian Dillons | 3-05 |
| 1958 | Glen Rovers | 5-08 | Blackrock | 4-09 |
| 1957 | St Vincent’s | | Glen Rovers | |
| 1956 | St Finbarr's | 3-07 | Glen Rovers | 2-01 |
| 1955 | St Finbarr's | 3-04 | Lough Rovers | 0-07 |
| 1954 | St Vincent’s | 5-11 | Brian Dillons | 6-01 |
| 1953 | Na Piarsaigh | 5-04 | St Vincent’s | 1-01 |
| 1952 | Lough Rovers | 4-04 | Na Piarsaigh | 1-03 |
| 1951 | St Vincent’s | | Lough Rovers | |
| 1950 | Glen Rovers | 1-05 | Brian Dillons | 0-01 |
| 1949 | Blackrock | 6-02 | Lough Rovers | 4-06 |
| 1948 | Lough Rovers | 4-04 | Glen Rovers | 3-03 |
| 1947 | Blackrock | 3-04 | Glen Rovers | 2-06 |
| 1946 | Na Piarsaigh | 7-02 | Glen Rovers | 5-01 |
| 1945 | Glen Rovers | 3-02 | St Finbarr's | 3-01 |
| 1944 | Glen Rovers | 9-05 | Brian Dillons | 1-00 |
| 1943 | Glen Rovers | 4-01 | Brian Dillons | 2-02 |
| 1942 | St Finbarr's | 4-02 | Glen Rovers | 2-06 |
| 1941 | St Finbarr's | | Mayfield | |
| 1940 | St Finbarr's | | | |
| 1939 | Glen Rovers | | Mayfield | |
| 1938 | Brian Dillons | | Glen Rovers | |
| 1937 | Brian Dillons | 5-07 | Lough Rovers | 4-04 |
| 1936 | Brian Dillons | 4-04 | Blackrock | 3-04 |
| 1935 | Mayfield | 9-04 | Brian Dillons | 5-02 |
| 1934 | Glen Rovers | | | |
| 1933 | St.Marys | 7-03 | Mayfield | 2-00 |
| 1932 | Lough Rovers | | | |
| 1931 | Blackrock | 3-06 | Brian Dillons | 1-04 |
| 1930 | Glen Rovers | 4-01 | Lough Rovers | 2-03 |
| 1929 | Glen Rovers | | | |
| 1928 | St.Annee's | 3-03 | Mayfield | 1-02 |
| 1927 | St Finbarr's | 5-05 | Commons Road | 3-06 |
| 1926 | College Rovers | | | |

=== Notes ===
- 1951 - St Vincent’s 2-01 - 2-01 Lough Rovers
- 1952 - Lough Rovers 4-02 - 2-08 Na Piarsaigh
- 2025 - Whitechurch 0-11 - 0-11 Na Piarsaigh

== See also ==
- Cork City Junior A Football Championship
