= Clement Smith =

Clement Smith may refer to:

- Clement Smith (administrator) (died 1552), of Great Baddow, MP for Maldon
- Clement Leslie Smith (1878–1927), VC recipient
- Clement Smith (footballer) (1910–1970), footballer for Chester, Halifax Town and Stoke City
- Clement Smith (priest) (died 1921), Canon of Windsor
- Clement Smith (Australian politician) (1894–1968), member of the South Australian House of Assembly
- Clement A. Smith (1901–1988), American pediatrician

== See also ==
- Clem Smith (disambiguation)
