= 1998 Limerick Senior Hurling Championship =

Annual hurling competition season

- Dates: 26 June – 20 September 1998
- Teams: 16
- Sponsor: PMG Steel
- Champions: Ahane (17th title); Kevin Herbert (captain); Éamonn Meskell (manager)
- Runners-up: Patrickswell; Declan O'Grady (captain); Phil Bennis (manager)
- Relegated: Old Christians

Tournament statistics
- Matches played: 36
- Goals scored: 116 (3.22 per match)
- Points scored: 809 (22.47 per match)
- Top scorer(s): Gary Kirby (4–54)

The 1998 Limerick Senior Hurling Championship was the 104th staging of the Limerick Senior Hurling Championship since its establishment by the Limerick County Board in 1887. The draw for the group stage was made on 17 February 1998. The championship ran from 26 June to 20 September 1998.

Patrickswell entered the championship as the defending champions.

The final was played on 20 September 1998 at the Gaelic Grounds in Limerick, between Patrickswell and Ahane, in what was their first ever meeting in the final. Ahane won the match by 1–11 to 0–09 to claim a record-breaking 17th championship title overall and a first title in 43 years.

Patrickswell's Gary Kirby was the championship's top scorer with 4–54.

== Team changes ==
=== To Championship ===
Promoted from the Limerick Intermediate Hurling Championship

- Monaleen

=== From Championship ===
Relegated to the Limerick Intermediate Hurling Championship

- Blackrock

== Group 1 ==
=== Group 1 table ===
Knockout stage Relegation stage

Team	Matches				Score			Pts
Team	Pld	W	D	L	For	Against	Diff	Pts
Ahane	3	3	0	0	51	37	14	6
Adare	3	2	0	1	54	46	8	4
Kilmallock	3	1	0	2	51	57	−6	2
Killeedy	3	0	0	3	42	58	−16	0

=== Group 1 results ===
28 June 1997 Round 1	Killeedy	3–06 – 2–13	Kilmallock	Páirc Caoimhín Ó Luing
	D Kirby 2–0, J Hayes 1–0, G Kelly 0–2, R Hayes 0–1, J Dore 0–1, D Flynn 0–1, J Magner 0–1.		M Cronin 1–2, M Houlihan 0–5, S Fitzgerald 1–1, P Hanley 0–2, P Tobin 0–2, J Connery 0–1.

28 June 1998 Round 1	Ahane	1–10 – 0–11	Adare	Bruff Grounds
	T Herbert 0–5, A Smith 1–0, J Moran 0–3, J O'Grady 0–1, J Morrissey 0–1.		T Houlihan 0–5, B Foley 0–2, J Foley 0–2, D Sheehan 0–1, C Murphy 0–1.

12 July 1998 Round 2	Adare	0–17 – 1–12	Killeedy	Newcastle West Grounds
	D Sheehan 0–6, M Foley 0–4, C Murphy 0–2, J Foley 0–2, S Fitzgibbon 0–2, J Barrett 0–1.		R Hayes 0–6, J Hayes 1–2, J Dore 0–1, J O'Connor 0–1, R Cunningham 0–1, P Kelly 0–1.

12 July 1998 Round 2	Ahane	0–16 – 1–11	Kilmallock	Fr Hayes Memorial Park
	J Moran 0–6, T Herbert 0–5, A Smith 0–2, S O'Connor 0–2, M Fitzgerald 0–1.		D Clarke 0–7, P Tobin 1–0, M Houlihan 0–2, P Barrett 0–1, A Maguire 0–1.

26 July 1998 Round 3	Adare	3–17 – 4–06	Kilmallock	Bruff Grounds
	S Fitzgibbon 3–1, D Sheehan 0–9, J Foley 0–3, M Foley 0–2, J Barrett 0–1, B Heffernan 0–1.		M Houlihan 2–6, J Fitzgerald 1–0, P Tobin 1–0.

26 July 1998 Round 3	Ahane	2–16 – 1–09	Killeedy	FitzGerald Park
	T Herbert 1–7, J Moran 0–5, J Morrissey 1–0, A Smith 0–1, C Smith 0–1, M Fitzgerald 0–1, J Mescall 0–1.		O Moran 1–0 (og), J Magner 0–2, P Cronin 0–2, J Hayes 0–2, J Kelleher 0–1, G Kelly 0–1.

== Group 2 ==
=== Group 2 table ===
Knockout stage Relegation stage

Team	Matches				Score			Pts
Team	Pld	W	D	L	For	Against	Diff	Pts
Patrickswell	3	3	0	0	85	37	48	6
Bruff	3	2	0	1	52	49	3	4
Na Piarsaigh	3	1	0	2	49	45	4	2
Old Christians	3	0	0	3	18	73	−55	0

=== Group 2 ===
28 June 1998 Round 1	Patrickswell	1–22 – 2–11	Bruff	FitzGerald Park
	G Kirby 0–8, E Grray 1–3, A Purcell 0–4, P O'Grady 0–3, D O'Grady 0–2, B Foley 0–2.		F O'Dwyer 1–5, M Reale 1–2, A O'Shea 0–1, J Mulqueen 0–1, D Reale 0–1, JA Moran 0–1.

28 June 1998 Round 1	Na Piarsaigh	0–18 – 0–05	Old Christians	Gaelic Grounds
	J Cormack 0–5, D Quigley 0–3, D Gray 0–2, D Hennessy 0–2, D Madigan 0–1, E Moriarty 0–1, S Laffan 0–1.		P Howard 0–4, G Hegarty 0–1.

10 July 1998 Round 2	Patrickswell	6–20 – 0–04	Old Christians	Gaelic Grounds
	G Kirby 1–11, J O'Donnell 2–0, A Purcell 1–2, B Foley 1–1, E Geary 1–0, A Carmody 0–2, P O'Grady 0–2, C Carey 0–1, D O'Grady 0–1.		G Hegarty 0–2, S Gorey 0–1, C Gorey 0–1.

11 July 1998 Round 2	Bruff	2–12 – 1–12	Na Piarsaigh	FitzGerald Park
	L Hogan 1–5, M Reale 0–5, JA Moran 1–1, S Mulqueen 0–1.		E Kiely 0–8, J Cormack 1–2, D Quigley 0–2.

26 July 1998 Round 3	Patrickswell	3–13 – 2–10	Na Piarsaigh	Gaelic Grounds
	G Kirby 1–9, B Foley 1–1, D Foley 1–0, D O'Grady 0–1, A Carmody 0–1, P O'Grady 0–1.		E Kiely 0–6, D Quigley 1–1, S O'Neill 1–1, P Beary 0–1, J Cormack 0–1.

26 July 1998 Round 3	Bruff	1–14 – 1–06	Old Christians	Fr Hayes Memorial Park
	I Hogan 0–6, M Reale 0–5, G Clancy 1–1, JA Moran 0–1, D Reale 0–1.		P Butler 0–6, D Jones 1–0.

== Group 3 ==
=== Group 3 table ===
Knockout stage Relegation stage

Team	Matches				Score			Pts
Team	Pld	W	D	L	For	Against	Diff	Pts
Garryspillane	3	2	1	0	55	42	13	5
Doon	3	2	1	0	42	38	4	5
Bruree	3	1	0	2	34	34	0	2
Pallasgreen	3	0	0	3	34	51	−17	0

=== Group 3 results ===
28 June 1998 Round 1	Bruree	1–10 – 2–03	Pallasgreen	BRuff Grounds
	S O'Connell 0–5, M Sexton 1–1, R Fenton 0–1, S Murphy 0–1, J Potter 0–1, D McCarthy 0–1.		G O'Connell 1–1, J Hourigan 1–0, N Gammell 0–2.

28 June 1998 Round 1	Doon	2–11 – 3–08	Garryspillane	Bruff Grounds
	P Coleman 0–7, J Stokes 1–0, J Donovan 1–0, T Hayes 0–3, D Stapleton 0–1.		F Carroll 2–2, TJ Ryan 1–0, Donie Ryan 0–2, David Ryan 0–2, R Sampson 0–1, J Murnane 0–1.

11 July 1998 Round 2	Doon	1–07 – 1–06	Bruree	Fr Hayes Memorial Park
	G McGrath 1–1, P Coleman 0–4, D Stapleton 0–2.		S O'Connell 1–2, E Potter 0–1, M Sexton 0–1, J Potter 0–1, D McCarthy 0–1.

11 July 1998 Round 2	Garryspillane	3–14 – 2–07	Pallasgreen	Bruff Grounds
	F Carroll 2–3, R English 1–1, TJ Ryan 0–4, P Tobin 0–3, A Garvey 0–1, J Murnane 0–1, R Sampson 0–1.		J Hourigan 1–2, N Gammell 0–5, P Cosgrave 1–0.

26 July 1998 Round 3	Garryspillane	1–12 – 1–09	Bruree	FitzGerald Park
	M O'Brien 1–2, F Carroll 0–5, TJ Ryan 0–3, D O'Brien 0–1, M Walsh 0–1.		S O'Connell 1–8, J Potter 0–1.

26 July 1998 Round 3	Doon	0–15 – 1–09	Pallasgreen	Cappamore Grounds
	P Coleman 0–7, G McGrath 0–4, K McGrath 0–1, B Crowe 0–1, D Stapleton 0–1, B Treacy 0–1.		G O'Connell 1–5, N Gammell 0–2, J Hourigan 0–2.

== Group 4 ==
=== Group 4 table ===
Knockout stage Relegation stage

Team	Matches				Score			Pts
Team	Pld	W	D	L	For	Against	Diff	Pts
Claughaun	3	2	1	0	52	31	21	5
Ballybrown	3	2	1	0	60	42	18	5
Monaleen	3	1	0	2	43	49	−6	2
Cappmore	3	0	0	3	34	64	−30	0

=== Group 4 results ===
26 June 1998 Round 1	Claughaun	1–10 – 0–13	Ballybrown	Gaelic Grounds
	M Galligan 0–9, G Ryan 1–0, J Carroll 0–1.		P Davoren 0–5, C Coughlan 0–3, M Byrnes 0–1, S Hayes 0–1, T Hall 0–1, O O'Connor 0–1, P Tiernan 0–1.

26 June 1997 Round 1	Monaleen	3–09 – 2–06	Cappamore	Fr Hayes Memorial Park
	N Madden 1–5, C Power 1–0, K O'Connell 1–0, J Cormican 0–2, C O'Reilly 0–1, M Stritch 0–1.		T Mulcahy 1–2, L Hammersley 1–0, D Mulcahy 0–2, M Gleeson 0–2.

10 July 1998 Round 2	Ballybrown	1–19 – 2–09	Cappamore	Cappamore Grounds
	P Davoren 0–8, N Doolin 0–7, C Coughlan 1–1, S Hayes 0–1, P Tiernan 0–1, T Hall 0–1.		T Mulcahy 0–4, S O'Dwyer 1–0, N Hayes 1–0, P Gleeson 0–3, D Mulcahy 0–1, L Hammersley 0–1.

11 July 1998 Round 2	Claughaun	0–12 – 0–11	Monaleen	Gaelic Grounds
	M Galligan 0–8, J Carroll 0–2, M Holland 0–1.		J Cormican 0–3, M Gavin 0–3, J O'Halloran 0–2, N Madden 0–1, K O'Connell 0–1, C O'Reilly 0–1.

26 July 1998 Round 3	Claughaun	5–12 – 1–04	Cappamore	Fr Hayes Memorial Park
	M Galligan 2–3, L O'Connor 1–3, G Ryan 1–2, P Loughran 1–0, M Holland 0–2, L Fitzgerald 0–1, P McGarry 0–1.		L Hammersley 0–4, S O'Dwyer 1–0.

26 July 1998 Round 3	Ballybrown	3–16 – 2–08	Monaleen	Gaelic Grounds
	P Davoren 1–7, P Tiernan 1–4, C Coughlan 1–2, S Hayes 0–1, N Doolan 0–1, O O'Connor 0–1.		C O'Reilly 1–0, S Mullane 1–0, N Madden 0–3, J Cormican 0–2, J O'Halloran 0–2, M Stritch 0–1.

== Relegation stage ==
=== Relegation semi-finals ===
9 August 1998 Semi-final	Killeedy	2–12 – 3–04	Old Christians	FitzGerald Park

16 August 1998 Semi-final	Pallasgreen	3–11 – 1–06	Cappamore	Fr Hayes Memorial Park

=== Relegation final ===
29 August 1998 Final	Old Christians	1–10 – 2–14	Cappamore	Bruff Grounds
	G Hegarty 0–8, J Power 1–1, P Butler 0–1.		L Hammersley 2–5, M Gleeson 0–3, N Hayes 0–3, P Gleeson 0–2, S O'Dwyer 0–1.

== Knockout stage ==
=== Quarter-finals ===
16 August 1998 Quarter-final	Doon	2–17 – 1–08	Claughaun	Bruff Grounds
	J Fox 1–2, P Coleman 0–5, G McGrath 1–1, T Hayes 0–4, J Stokes 0–2, G Ryan 0–1, B Crowe 0–1, D Stapleton 0–1.		M Galligan 1–6, M Ryan 0–1, G Ryan 0–1.

9 August 1998 Quarter-final	Garryspillane	1–14 – 1–14	Ballybrown	Gaelic Grounds
	F Carroll 0–7, R Sampson 1–0, A Garvey 0–3, Donal Ryan 0–2, Dave Ryan 0–1, P Tobin 0–1.		C Coughlan 1–2, P Davoren 0–5, P McCarthy 0–2, S Kiely 0–2, S Hayes 0–1, P Tiernan 0–1, N Doolin 0–1.

9 August 1998 Quarter-final	Ahane	4–15 – 1–13	Bruff	Gaelic Grounds
	J O'Grady 2–1, J Morrissey 2–1, J Moran 0–6, J Meskell 0–2, M Fitzgerald 0–2, A Smith 0–1, T Herbert 0–1, P Smith 0–1.		I Hogan 0–5, M Reale 1–1, B Callinan 0–2, A O'Shea 0–1, D Reale 0–1, A Burke 0–1, J Mulqueen 0–1.

16 August 1998 Quarter-final	Patrickswell	0–13 – 0–13	Adare	Bruff Grounds
	G Kirby 0–7, E Geary 0–3, A Carmody 0–1, P O'Grady 0–1, T O'Brien 0–1.		J Foley 0–7, D Sheehan 0–3, C Murphy 0–1, J Barrett 0–1, B Foley 0–1.

16 August 1998 Quarter-final replay	Garryspillane	2–18 – 3–14	Ballybrown
	F Carroll 0–8, R Sampson 2–0, Donie Ryan 0–5, P Tobin 0–3, R English 0–1.		P Davoren 1–7, P McCarthy 1–2, O O'Connor 1–0, T Hall 0–2, S Hayes 0–1, P Tiernan 0–1, P Mulqueen 0–1.

22 August 1998 Quarter-final	Patrickswell	4–14 – 3–10	Adare	Bruff Grounds
	G Kirby 2–6, A Purcell 2–1, P O'Grady 0–3, B Foley 0–2, D O'Grady 0–1, A Carmody 0–1.		D Sheehan 0–4, B Foley 1–1, M Foley 1–0, J McNamara 1–0, J Foley 0–2, C Murphy 0–1, C Fitzgerald 0–1, J Barrett 0–1.

=== Semi-finals ===
23 August 1998 Semi-final	Ahane	2–12 – 1–08	Garryspillane	Gaelic Grounds
	J Morrissey 1–2, T Herbert 0–5, J O'Grady 1–0, S O'Connor 0–2, J Moran 0–2, A Smith 0–1.		R English 1–0, F Carroll 0–3, David Ryan 0–3, Donie Ryan 0–1, A Garvey 0–1.

30 August 1998 Semi-final	Patrickswell	2–13 – 1–08	Doon	Bruff Grounds
	G Kirby 0–8, B Foley 1–1, A Purcell 1–0, D O'Grady 0–2, D Foley 0–1, A Carmody 0–1.		D Stapleton 1–1, P Coleman 0–3, B Crowe 0–2, T Hayes 0–2.

=== Final ===
20 September 1998 Final	Ahane	1–11 – 0–09	Patrickswell	Gaelic Grounds
	T Herbert 0–5, J Morrissey 1–1, J Moran 0–3, M Fitzgerald, J Meskell 0–1 each.		G Kirby 0–5, B Foley, P O`Grady, A Purcell, E Geary 0–1 each.

== Championship statistics ==
=== Top scorers ===
Rank	Player	Club	Tally	Total	Matches	Average
1	Gary Kirby	Patrickswell	4–54	66	7	9.42
2	Frankie Carroll	Garryspillane	4–28	40	6	6.66
3	Pat Davoren	Ballybrown	2–32	38	5	7.60
4	Mike Galligan	Claughaun	3–26	35	4	8.75
5	Turlough Herbert	Ahane	1–28	31	6	5.16
