= Clem Smith (hurler) =

Irish hurler

Personal information
- Native name: Laghmainn Mac Gabhann (Irish)
- Nickname: Clem
- Born: 1975 (age 50–51) Lisnagry, County Limerick, Ireland
- Occupation: Publican

Sport
- Sport: Hurling
- Position: Right wing-back
Club
- Years: Club
- Ahane
Club titles
- Limerick titles: 3
Inter-county
- Years: County
- 1997-2005: Limerick
Inter-county titles
- Munster titles: 0
- All-Irelands: 0
- NHL: 1
- All Stars: 0

Clement Smith (born 1975) is an Irish former hurler. At club level, he played with Ahane and at inter-county level with the Limerick senior hurling team.

== Career ==
Smith played hurling at all grades as a student at Limerick CBS. He was part of the school's senior team that won the Dr Harty Cup title in 1993, after beating St Flannan's College by 5–05 to 1–12 in the final.

At club level, Smith first played for Ahane in the juvenile and underage grades, before progressing to adult level. He won his first Limerick SHC medal in 1998, before captaining the team when they retained the title in 1999. Smith won a third and final Limerick SHC title when, in 2004, Ahane beat Garryspillane by 1–11 to 0–13 in the final.

Smith first appeared on the inter-county scene with Limerick as a member of the minor team in 1993. He later spent one season with the under-21 team in 1996. Smith was drafted onto the senior team in 1997 and was part of Limerick's National Hurling League-winning panel that year. He was appointed captain of the team for the 2000 season. Smith retired from inter-county hurling in March 2005.

== Honours ==
Limerick CBS

- Dr Harty Cup: 1993

Ahane

- Limerick Senior Hurling Championship: 1998, 1999, 2004

Limerick

- National Hurling League: 1997
