= Menlo Emmetts GAA =

Menlo Emmetts
- Emitigh Mhionlaigh
- County: Galway
- Colours: Green and black
- Grounds: Menlo Emmetts GAA Grounds

Playing kits
Standard colours

Menlo Emmetts GAA is a Gaelic Athletic Association club located in the village of Menlo, County Galway, Ireland. The club is primarily concerned with the game of hurling.

== History ==
Menlo Emmetts was established in 1981 when a number of Castlegar club members decided to set up their own club. The club has operated at junior level for all of its existence, with Galway JBHC title being won in 1983 and 2006. Arguably, the Menlo Emmetts club enjoyed its greatest success in 2007 when the club defeated Tara Rocks to claim the All-Ireland JBHC title.

== Honours ==
- All-Ireland Junior B Club Hurling Championship (1): 2007
- Galway Junior B Hurling Championship]] (2): 1983, 2006
