= 1989 Limerick Senior Hurling Championship =

Annual hurling competition season

- Dates: 8 July – 10 September 1989
- Teams: 16
- Champions: Ballybrown (1st title); Terence Kenny (captain); Tom Ryan (manager)
- Runners-up: Doon; Paddy Moloney (captain)

Tournament statistics
- Matches played: 17
- Goals scored: 63 (3.71 per match)
- Points scored: 348 (20.47 per match)
- Top scorer(s): Christy Keyes (2–26)

The 1989 Limerick Senior Hurling Championship was the 95th staging of the Limerick Senior Hurling Championship since its establishment by the Limerick County Board in 1887. The championship ran from 8 July to 10 September 1989.

Patrickswell entered the championship as the defending champions, however, they were beaten by Cappamore in the quarter-finals.

The final was played on 10 September 1989 at the Gaelic Grounds in Limerick, between Ballybrown and Doon, in what was their first ever meeting in the final. Ballybrown won the match by 4–10 to 2–09 to claim their first ever championship title.

Ballybrown's Christy Keyes was the championship's top scorer with 2–26.

== Results ==
=== First round ===
8 July 1989 First round	Claughaun	0–12 – 1–07	Mungret	Gaelic Grounds
	G Ryan 0–8, M Galligan 0–3, B O'Mara 0–1.		G O'Brien 1–1, D Keating 0–4, E Ahern 0–1, D O'Dea 0–1.

8 July 1989 First round	South Liberties	4–07 – 0–13	Killeedy	FitzGerald Park
	D Nash 2–0, N Nash 1–0, M Nash 1–0, L Dooley 0–3, B Finn 0–3, J McGinly 0–1.		P Fitzmaurice 0–8, D Flynn 0–2, L Shine 0–1, K Kelly 0–1, J Cunningham 0–1.

9 July 1989 First round	Ballybrown	3–13 – 1–12	Adare	Bruff Sportsfield
	C Keyes 0–11, S Hayes 2–0, C Coughlan 1–0, T Kenny 0–2.		M Benson 0–7, D Keane 1–0, M Alfred 0–2, B Heffernan 0–2, B Flynn 0–1.

9 July 1989 First round	Patrickswell	5–12 – 1–07	Feohanagh	Bruff Sportsfield
	G Kirby 1–7, G Hayes 2–1, F Nolan 1–1, S Moore 1–1, S Kirby 0–2.		T Quaid 1–3, M Sweeney 0–3, B Butler 0–1.

9 July 1989 First round	Bruree	2–12 – 0–09	Ahane	Fr Hayes Memorial Park

9 July 1989 First round	Kilmallock	2–14 – 1–06	Newcastle West	Ballyagran Grounds

9 July 1989 First round	Doon	1–17 – 2–07	Blackrock	Bruff Grounds

16 July 1989 First round	Cappamore	7–08 – 1–05	Garryspillane	Fr Hayes Memorial Park
	Donal Mulcahy 2–1, M Lonergan 2–1, R Hammersley 2–1, G Sheehan 1–2, A Murphy 0–1, L O'Brien 0–1, I Walsh 0–1.		R Sampson 1–1, F Carroll 0–2, M Walsh 0–2.

=== Quarter-finals ===
23 July 1989 Quarter-final	Ballybrown	2–08 – 1–11	South Liberties	Bruff SPortsfield
	T Kenny 2–2, O O'Connor 0–3, C Keyes 0–2, S Hayes 0–1.		G McManus 1–1, L Dooley 0–3, B Finn 0–1, P Donnelly 0–1, D Nash 0–1, A Shanahan 0–1, M Nash 0–1, N Nash 0–1, M Fitzgerald 0–1.

30 July 1989 Quarter-final	Cappamore	2–09 – 1–08	Patrickswell	FitzGerald Park
	L O'Brien 0–5, G Sheehan 1–0, M Gleeson 1–0, N Sheehan 0–1, D Mulcahy 0–1, M Lonergan 0–1, B Hammersley 0–1.		G Kirby 1–4, J Carey 0–3, S Foley 0–1, N Carey 0–1.

30 July 1989 Quarter-final	Doon	1–14 – 4–05	Bruree	Fr Hayes Memorial Park
	J O'Donovan 1–2, G McGrattan 0–5, T McGrath 0–3, R Walsh 0–2, R Quigley 0–1.		G Mullane 3–2, D McCarthy 1–0, D Deady 0–2, E Potter 0–2.

5 August 1989 Quarter-final	Kilmallock	1–12 – 1–10	Claughaun	Bruff Sportsfield
	M Houlihan 0–8, P Tobin 1–1, J Neenan 0–2, D McCarthy 0–1.		L O'Connor 1–4, F Fitzgerald 0–3, M Galligan 0–2, G Ryan 0–1.

6 August 1989 Quarter-final replay	Ballybrown	4–14 – 0–08	South Liberties	Bruff Sportsfield
	C Keyes 1–5, P Mulqueen 2–0, T Kenny 1–2, O O'Connor 0–2, P Davoren 0–2, P O'Connor 0–1, T Hall 0–1, J Mann 0–1.		B Finn 0–3, D Nash 0–1, M Nash 0–1, N Nash 0–1, M Grimes 0–1, L Dooley 0–1.

13 August 1989 Quarter-final replay	Doon	5–05 – 2–11	Bruree	Fr Hayes Memorial Park
	T McGrath 2–1, E Maher 2–0, J O'Donovan 1–1, R Maher 0–2, J Quinlan 0–1.		J O'Brien 1–1, G Mullane 0–4, D McCarthy 1–0, M Mullane 0–2, D Deady 0–2, P Potter 0–2.

=== Semi-finals ===
27 August 1989 Semi-final	Ballybrown	2–17 – 1–11	Kilmallock	Gaelic Grounds
	P Mulqueen 1–4, C Keyes 0–5, T Kenny 1–1, P Davoren 0–4, O O'Connor 0–3.		P Kelly 0–5, J Neenan 0–4, T Nelligan 1–0, M Houlihan 0–1, M Nelligan 0–1.

27 August 1989 Semi-final	Doon	0–15 – 0–10	Cappamore Grounds	Gaelic Grounds
	R Walsh 0–7, G McGrath 0–2, T McGrath 0–2, J O'Donovan 0–2, P Moloney 0–1, R Quigley 0–1.		L O'Brien 0–6, G Sheehan 0–1, Donal Mulcahy 0–1, Diarmuid Mulcahy 0–1, M Lonergan 0–1.

=== Final ===
10 September 1989 Final	Ballybrown	4–10 – 2–09	Doon	Gaelic Grounds
	P Davoren 2–1, C Keyes 1–3, S Hayes 1–0, T Kenny 0–3, T Hall 0–2, J O'Connor 0–1, O O'Connor 0–1.		R Walsh 2–5, T McGrath 1–0, P Moloney 0–1, M Ryan 0–1, R Quigley 0–1, J O'Donovan 0–1.	Referee: M Reidy (Croom)
