= Niall Breen (hurler) =

Irish Gaelic sportsperson

Personal information
- Native name: Níall Ó Braoin (Irish)
- Born: 2 November 1989 (age 36) Gorey, County Wexford

Sport
- Sport: Hurling
- Position: Goalkeeper
Club
- Years: Club
- 2007-: Tara Rocks
Inter-county*
| Years | County | Apps (scores) |
| 2011- | Wexford | 1 (0-0) |
- *Inter County team apps and scores correct as of 20:00, 30 May 2011.

Niall Breen (born 2 November 1989 in Gorey, County Wexford) is an Irish sportsperson. He plays hurling with his local club Tara Rocks and has been a member of the Wexford senior inter-county team since 2011.

== Playing career ==
=== Club ===
Breen plays his club hurling with the Tara Rocks club.

=== Inter-county ===
Breen has lined out at various grades for Wexford, beginning as substitute goalkeeper on the county's under-21 team. His tenure was an unsuccessful one with Wexford losing the Leinster final to Kilkenny.

Breen made his senior championship debut against Antrim in 2011, replacing Noel Carton as first-choice goalkeeper.
