= 1990 All-Ireland Senior Club Hurling Championship final =

1990 All-Ireland Senior Club Hurling Championship Final
- Event: 1989–90 All-Ireland Senior Club Hurling Championship
| Ballyhale Shamrocks | Ballybrown |
| 1-16 | 0-16 |
- Date: 17 March 1990
- Venue: Croke Park, Dublin
- Referee: Willie Horgan (Cork)
- Attendance: 15,708

The 1990 All-Ireland Senior Club Hurling Championship final was a hurling match played at Croke Park on 17 March 1990 to determine the winners of the 1989–90 All-Ireland Senior Club Hurling Championship, the 20th season of the All-Ireland Senior Club Hurling Championship, a tournament organized by the Gaelic Athletic Association for the champion clubs of the four provinces of Ireland. The final was contested by Ballyhale Shamrocks of Kilkenny and Ballybrown of Limerick, with Ballyhale Shamrocks winning by 1-16 to 0-16.

The All-Ireland final was a unique occasion as it was the first ever championship meeting between Ballyhale Shamrocks and Ballybrown. It remains their only championship meeting at this level. Ballyhale Shamrocks were hoping to make history by winning a record-equaling third All-Ireland title, while Ballybrown were hoping to win their first All-Ireland title.

Ballybrown got off to a great start and led by six points. A Ger Fennelly goal in the 24th minute reduced the Ballyhale deficit, however, Ballybrown were still four to the good at the interval. A second-half surge saw Ballyhale claw their way back, however, it was Fennelly's goal that proved the difference in the end.

Ballyhale's victory secured their third All-Ireland title. They joined Blackrock as outright leaders on the all-time roll of honour.

== Match ==
=== Details ===
17 March 1990

| Ballyhale Shamrocks | 1-16 - 0-16 | Ballybrown |
|---|---|---|
| G Fennelly 1-5 (1-2f), J Lawlor 0-3, D Fennelly 0-2, T Shefflin 0-2, B Mason 0-2, B Fennelly 0-1. | | C Keyes 0-5, T Hall 0-4 (4f), O O'Connor 0-3, T Kenny 0-2, P Davoran 0-1, C Coughlan 0-1. |

Croke Park, Dublin
Attendance: 15,708
Referee: W Horgan (Cork)

| Ballyhale Shamrocks | Ballybrown |
