= Whitechurch GAA =

Gaelic clubs in Ireland

Whitechurch
- An Teampall Geal
- Founded: 1904
- County: Cork
- Colours: Maroon and saffron
- Grounds: Whitechurch & Waterloo Community Centre
- Coordinates: 51.98251952°N 8.53177980°W

Playing kits
Standard colours

Whitechurch GAA is a Gaelic Athletic Association club located in the village of Whitechurch, County Cork, Ireland. The club fields teams in both hurling and Gaelic football.

== History ==
The Whitechurch club was first established in 1904 to represent the eastern half of Blarney parish. It made some progress on the Gaelic football field, however, it went into decline for a period. It was reformed as a hurling club for some years in the 1920s, and competed in the newly formed City Division. A shortage of players result in the club becoming defunct by 1928.

In 1959, Whitechurch was revived as a sister Gaelic football club to Blarney hurling club in the Muskerry Division. The Whitechurch-Blarney arrangement ended in 1968, when Whitechurch became an independent dual club. Two Mid Cork JBHC titles were secured in 1968 and 1970.

Whitechurch joined forces with the Grenagh club in 1973, however, a number of lean years followed in terms of success as the club struggled for survival. Hurling in the club was revived in 1984, the same year the club moved back to the Seandún Division. The club amalgamated with White's Cross for a period, before once again deciding to revert to being an independent club in 2012. Since that decision was made the club has enjoyed some underage county championship successes. Whitechurch enjoyed its greatest success in 2017 when the club defeated Upperchurch-Drombane to claim both the Munster JBHC and All-Ireland JBHC titles.

== Honours ==
- All-Ireland Junior B Club Hurling Championship (1): 2017
- Munster Junior B Club Hurling Championship (1): 2016
- Cork Junior B Hurling Championship (1): 2016
- Cork City Junior Hurling Championship (2): 2024, 2025, 2026

== Notable players ==
- Paudie Kissane: All-Ireland SFC winner (2010)
- Micheál Mullins: All-Ireland U20HC winner (2021, 2023)
