= 1989–90 All-Ireland Senior Club Hurling Championship =

All-Ireland Senior Club Hurling Championship 1989–90
Championship Details
- Dates: 24 September 1989 – 17 March 1990
- Teams: 27

All Ireland Champions
- Winners: Ballyhale Shamrocks (3rd win)
- Captain: Wattie Phelan

All Ireland Runners-up
- Runners-up: Ballybrown
- Captain: Terence Kenny

Provincial Champions
- Munster: Ballybrown
- Leinster: Ballyhale Shamrocks
- Ulster: Loughgiel Shamrocks
- Connacht: Sarsfield's

Championship Statistics
- Top Scorer: Ger Fennelly (2–15)

The 1989–90 All-Ireland Senior Club Hurling Championship was the 20th staging of the All-Ireland Senior Club Hurling Championship, the Gaelic Athletic Association's premier inter-county club hurling tournament. The championship ran from 24 September 1989 to 17 March 1990.

Buffers Alley of Wexford entered the championship as the defending champions, however, they were beaten by Cuala of Dublin in the Leinster semi-final replay. Ballybrown of Limerick, Clonoulty–Rossmore of Tipperary, Cuala, Lusmagh of Offaly and Roanmore of Waterford made their championship debuts, while Glen Rovers of Cork returned after a long absence.

The All-Ireland final was played at Croke Park in Dublin on 17 March 1990, between Ballyhale Shamrocks of Kilkenny and Ballybrown of Limerick, in what was a first championship meeting between the teams. Ballyhale Shamrocks won the match by 1–16 to 0–16 to win a record-equalling third title.

Ger Fennelly was the championship's top scorer with 2–15.

== Connacht Senior Club Hurling Championship ==
=== Connacht quarter-finals ===
8 October 1989 Quarter-final	Oran	w/o – scr.	Gortletteragh

8 October 1989 Quarter-final	Tooreen	w/o – scr.	Craobh Rua

=== Connacht semi-final ===
22 October 1989 Semi-final	Tooreen	2–15 – 2–06	Oran	Aghamore Grounds
	J Henry 1–9, D Greally 1–0, J Cunnane 0–3, M Trench 0–2, S Caulfield 0–1.		C Kelly 1–2, H Crowley 1–0, E Depinna 0–4.	Referee: P Maguire (Sligo)

=== Connacht final ===
5 November 1989 Final	Sarsfields	5–14 – 0–00	Tooreen	Athleague Sportsfield
	M Kenny 2–1, P Kenny 1–3, M McGrath 1–1, J Cooney 0–4, M Connolly 1–0, N Morrissey 0–2, A Donoghue 0–2, M Mulkerrins 0–1.

== Leinster Senior Club Hurling Championship ==
=== Leinster first round ===
22 October 1989 First round	Carnew Emmets	1–06 – 1–06	Brownstown	Aughrim County Ground
	E Brennan 1–1, B Elliott 0–4, E Brennan 0–1.		A Clancy 1–0, P Clancy 0–2, J Daly 0–2, J Leonard 0–1, E Dolan 0–1.	Referee: N O'Donoghue (Dublin)

22 October 1989 First round	Longford Slashers	0–06 – 2–18	Cuala	Michael Fay Park
	S Mulhern 0–3, L Doran 0–1, S Stakelum 0–1, N Daly 0–1.		M Dempsey 0–7, D Bernie 1–2, M Wallace 1–0, E Murphy 0–3, C O'Driscoll 0–2, M Morrissey 0–2, K Schutte 0–1, M Kirwan 0–1, J O'Riordan 0–1.	Referee: T O'Dowd (Westmeath)

22 October 1989 First round	Castledermot	3–07 – 3–09	Trim	Geraldine Park
	G Deering 1-1, D Carton 1-0, E Byrne 1-0, D O'Keeffe 0-3, J Gibbons 0-2, M McNamara 0-1.		E McCaffrey 1-5, D Murray 1-2, M Dempsey 1-1, T Massey 0-1.

22 October 1989 First round	St Mullin's	1–21 – 0–11	Naomh Moninne	Dr Cullen Park
	P Murphy 0–11, L Doyle 1–1, J McDonald 0–3, S Connors 0–2, E Connors 0–1, M Walsh 0–1, J Kavanagh 0–1, JJ Murphy 0–1.		J Murphy 0–9, D Kennedy 0–1, P Callan 0–1.

28 October 1989 First round replay	Brownstown	2–08 – 1–10	Carnew Emmets	Fr O'Reilly Park
	J Leonard 1–2, C Shaw 1–0, J Fitzsimons 0–3, P Clancy 0–2, T Carr 0–1.		B Elliott 0–6, T Munroe 1–0, E Brennan 0–2, V Munroe 0–2.	Referee: J Bailey (Dublin)

=== Leinster quarter-finals ===
5 November 1989 Quarter-final	St Mullin's	0–01 – 2–17	Buffer's Alley	Dr Cullen Park
	J McDonald 0–1.		S O'Leary 1–2, P O'Donoghue 0–5, E Sinnott 1–1, T Dempsey 0–4, M Butler 0–4, S Whelan 0–1.

5 November 1989 Quarter-final	Brownstown	1–09 – 4–14	Portlaoise	Fr. O'Reilly Park
	E Dolan 1–1, J Fitzsimons 0–4, P Clancy 0–3, T carr 0–1.		N Rigney 1–4, M Cashin 1–3, M Keegan 1–1, T Fitzpatrick 1–1, J Taylor 0–3, G Hoey 0–1, D Critchley 0–1.

5 November 1989 Quarter-final	Cuala	7–13 – 2–07	Lusmagh	O'Toole Park
	M Wallace 3–0, B Ryan 2–0, M Dempsey 0–6, E Murphy 1–2, D Bernie 1–0, M O'Callaghan 0–2, C Ó Giolláin 0–1, M Morrissey 0–1, C O'Driscoll 0–1.		J Kelly 1–0, K Dalton 1–0, J Troy 0–3, B Kelly 0–1, R Byrne 0–1, B Troy 0–1, R Byrne 0–1.

5 November 1989 Quarter-final	Trim	1–04 – 2–13	Ballyhale Shamrocks	St Loman's Park
	M Kelly 1–0 (og), B Murray 1–0, K Murray 0–3, D O'Keeffe 0–1.		S Fennelly 1–0, B Fennelly 0–3, D Fennelly 0–3, J Lawlor 0–2, S Reid 0–1, B Mason 0–1, T Shefflin 0–1, T Phelan 0–1, G Fennelly 0–1.

=== Leinster semi-finals ===
19 November 1989 Semi-final	Buffers Alley	0–13 – 1–10	Cuala	Dr Cullen Park
	T Dempsey 0–5, M Butler 0–4, M Foley 0–1, T Doran 0–1, S Whelan 0–1, S O'Leary 0–1.		J Riordan 1–0, B Ryan 0–3, M Dempsey 0–2, M Wallace 0–2, V Holden 0–1, PJ Holden 0–1, M Kirwan 0–1.	Referee: P Delaney (Laois)

19 November 1989 Semi-final	Ballyhale Shamrocks	1–12 – 2–06	Portlaoise	Dr Cullen Park
	L Fennelly 1–3, G Fennelly 0–3, J Lawlor 0–2, B Fennelly 0–2, T Phelan 0–1, D Fennelly 0–1.		M Cashin 2–1, N Rigney 0–4, M Keenan 0–1.	Referee: J Denton (Wexford)

25 November 1989 Semi-final replay	Buffers Alley	0–11 – 4–06	Cuala	Dr Cullen Park
	M Butler 0–4, T Dempsey 0–2, J Gahan 0–2, P Gahan 0–1, S Whelan 0–1, T Doran 0–1.		M Wallace 2–0, M O'Callaghan 1–0, D Bernie 1–0, M Morrissey 0–3, M Dempsey 0–2, B Ryan 0–1.	Referee: P Delaney (Laois)

=== Leinster final ===
9 December 1989 Final	Ballyhale Shamrocks	2–11 – 0–07	Cuala	Geraldine Park
	G Fennelly 1–2, B Mason 1–1, L Fennelly 0–3, D Fennelly 0–2, J Lawlor 0–2, B Fennelly 0–1.		M Demspey 0–3, V Holden 0–2, M Morrissey 0–1, C Ó Drisceoil 0–1.	Referee: P Delaney (Laois)

== Munster Senior Club Hurling Championship ==
=== Munster quarter-finals ===
8 October 1989 Quarter-final	Ballyduff	1–04 – 4–15	Glen Rovers	Ballyduff Grounds
	P O'Rourke 1–0, J O'Sullivan 0–1, F Whelan 0–1, C Houlihan 0–1, PJ Houlihan 0–1.		J Buckley 2–3, K McGuckin 1–3, J Fitzgibbon 1–1, J O'Brien 0–2, K Fitzgibbon 0–1, C McGuckin 0–1, D Whitley 0–1, G Riordan 0–1, C Ring 0–1, I Lynam 0–1.	Referee: K Walsh (Limerick)

22 October 1989 Quarter-final	Roanmore	3–04 – 1–12	Ballybrown	Walsh Park
	K Delahunty 1–2, T Shanahan 1–1, M Mackey 1–0, E Nolan 0–1.		T Hall 0–5, P Davoren 0–4, P Mulqueen 1–0, D Lyons 0–1, T Kenny 0–1, E Cliffe 0–1.	Referee: G Ryan (Tipperary)

=== Munster semi-finals ===
5 November 1989 Semi-final	Glen Rovers	4–04 – 1–18	Sixmilebridge	Glen Field
	P Horgan 2–1, J Fitzgibbon 1–0, C Ring 1–0, K McGuckin 0–3.		J Lynch 1–4, D McInerney 0–6, G McInerney 0–4, F Quilligan 0–2, P Morey 0–1, D Chaplin 0–1.	Referee: T Murray (Limerick)

5 November 1989 Semi-final	Ballybrown	1–10 – 1–09	Clonoulty-Rossmore	Bruff Grounds
	S Hayes 1–0, P Davoren 0–3, C Keyes 0–2, J Mann 0–2, T Kenny 0–2, T Hall 0–1.		K Ryan 0–4, P Hayes 1–0, J Hayes 0–3, D Ryan 0–2.

=== Munster final ===
19 November 1989 Final	Ballybrown	2–12 – 1–08	Sixmilebridge	Gaelic Grounds
	C Keyes 1–4, J Mann 1–1, P Davoren 0–3, O O'Connor 0–2, C Coughlan 0–1, J O'Connor 0–1.		G McInerney 1–2, D McInerney 0–3, L Quinlan 0–1, J Lynch 0–1, J Murphy 0–1.	Referee: W Barrett (Tipperary)

== Ulster Senior Club Hurling Championship ==
=== Ulster semi-final ===
1 October 1989 Semi-final	Portaferry	9–11 – 0–07	Kevin Lynch's	St Patrick's Park
	K McManus 4–0, B Coulter 2–4, C Mageean 1–2, A Mageean 1–2, G Fitzsimons 1–1, N Sands 0–1, P Mason 0–1.		B McGilligan 0–3, M McCracken 0–2, J Bradley 0–1, J Donaghey 0–1.

=== Ulster final ===
22 October 1989 Final	Portaferry	2–09 – 1–14	Loughgiel Shamrocks	St Patrick's Park
	B Coulter 0–5, C McGeehan 1–1, G Fitzsimmons 1–0, K Fitzsimmons 0–1, N Sands 0–1, L Donaldson 0–1.		O McFetridge 0–9, G Traynor 1–1, SP McKillop 0–2, D McKinley 0–1, O McFadden 0–1.

== All-Ireland Senior Club Hurling Championship ==
=== All-Ireland quarter-final ===
28 January 1990 Quarter-final	Loughgiel Shamrocks	3–12 – 2–10	Desmonds	St Patrick's Park
	B Lafferty 1–1, A McCarry 0–4, O McFetridge 0–4, P Carey 1–0, G Traynor 1–0, A McNaughton 0–3.		M Burke 0–8, J Donoghue 1–0, M Killeen 1–0, P Lynch 0–2.

=== All-Ireland semi-finals ===
11 February 1990 Semi-final	Loughgiel Shamrocks	0–08 – 0–09	Ballybrown	Fr Healy Park
	O McFetridge 0–4, A McCarry 0–2, S McKillop 0–1, O McFadden 0–1.		T Hall 0–4, C Coughlan 0–2, P Davoren 0–1, O O'Connor 0–1, C Keyes 0–1.	Referee: P Delaney (Laois)

11 February 1990 Semi-final	Ballyhale Shamrocks	2–08 – 0–12	Sarsfields	Dunlo Grounds
	D Fennelly 1–1, G Fennelly 0–4, J Lawlor 1–0, B Mason 0–3.		M McGrath 0–9, P Kelly 0–1, M Kenny 0–1, A Donoghue 0–1.	Referee: W Barrett (Tipperary)

=== All-Ireland final ===
17 March 1990 Final	Ballyhale Shamrocks	1–16 – 0–16	Ballybrown	Croke Park
	G Fennelly 1–5, J Lawlor 0–3, T Shefflin 0–2, D Fennelly 0–2, B Mason 0–2, B Fennelly 0–1.		C Keyes 0–5, T Hall 0–4, O O'Connor 0–3, T Kenny 0–2, C Coughlan 0–1, P Davoran 0–1.	Referee: W Horgan (Cork)

== Championship statistics ==
=== Top scorers ===
Rank	Player	Club	Tally	Total	Matches	Average
1	Ger Fennelly	Ballyhale Shamrocks	2–15	21	5	4.20
2	Martin Wallace	Cuala	6–02	20	5	4.00
2	Murty Dempsey	Cuala	0–20	20	5	4.00
4	Olcan McFetridge	Loughgiel Shamrocks	0–17	17	3	5.66
5	Brendan Coulter	Portaferry	2–09	15	2	7.50
5	Christy Keyes	Ballybrown	1–12	15	4	3.75
