= Tara Rocks GAA =

Gaelic Athletic Association club in Gorey, Ireland

Tara Rocks
- Carraig Teabhra
- County: Wexford
- Colours: Blue and yellow
- Grounds: Ballytegan

Playing kits
Standard colours

Senior Club Championships
	All Ireland	Leinster champions	Wexford champions
Hurling:	0	0	0

Tara Rocks GAA is a Gaelic Athletic Association club located outside Gorey, County Wexford, Ireland. The club is primarily concerned with the games of hurling and camogie.

== History ==
According to its website, Tara Rocks is the "smallest club in Wexford, having just over one mile square of a catchment area" outside Gorey. The club dates to the first half of the 20th century. Their first major success occurred in 1948 when Tara Rocks won the Wexford JFC title.

Tara Rocks secured a Leinster Club JBHC title in 2006, before losing the All-Ireland final to Menlo Emmets. A shortage of players in 2017 resulted in Tara Rocks amalgamating for a period with Kilanerin-Ballyfad, having previously joined with them at underage level. The amalgamation years resulted in a resurgence of the club, with Tara Rocks winning the Wexford IAHC title in 2021.

== Honours ==
- Leinster Junior B Club Hurling Championship (1): 2006
- Wexford Intermediate A Hurling Championship (1): 2021
- Wexford Junior Football Championship (1): 1948
- Wexford Junior B Hurling Championship (2): 1997, 2006
- Wexford Junior B Football Championship (1): 1984
- Gorey District Junior B Hurling Championship (5): 1995, 1996, 1997, 2005, 2006
- Gorey District Junior B Football Championship (8): 1987, 1997, 2000, 2001, 2002, 2004, 2005, 2006

== Notable players ==
- Niall Breen
