= Leinster Junior B Club Hurling Championship =

- Current season or competition: 2026 Leinster Junior B Club Hurling Championship
- Irish: Craobh Iomána Sóisear B Laighean
- Code: Hurling
- Founded: 2006; 20 years ago
- Region: Leinster (GAA)
- Trophy: Alfie Hickey Memorial Cup
- No. of teams: 8
- Title holders: Tommy Larkin's (1st title)
- Sponsors: Killeedy GAA Club

The Leinster Junior B Club Hurling Championship is an annual hurling competition organised by Killeedy GAA Club in Limerick since 2006 for the champion junior B hurling teams in the province of Leinster in Ireland. The Antrim and Galway champions are also represented in the competition.

The series of games are played during the winter months with the Leinster final currently being played in January. The prize for the winning team is the Alfie Hickey Memorial Cup. The championship has always been played on a straight knockout basis whereby once a team loses they are eliminated from the championship.

The Leinster Championship is an integral part of the wider All-Ireland Junior B Club Hurling Championship. The winners and runners-up of the Leinster final join the winners and runners-up of the Munster final in the semi-final stages of the All-Ireland Championship.

== History ==
Provincial club championships for respective junior B champions was the idea of the Killeedy GAA Club who, after winning the Limerick JBHC title in 2005, realised there were no provincial competitions in that grade of hurling. A senior championship had been running in Leinster since 1970, while intermediate and junior competitions had been recently introduced by GAA President Seán Kelly. Members of the Killeedy club approached a supportive Kelly, however, their proposal was rejected by Central Council. In spite of this setback, Killeedy organised their own unofficial Munster Championship for Junior B championship winners in 2005. A corresponding Leinster Championship was first organised in 2006 and received the official support of the Leinster Council.

== The championship ==
=== Overview ===
The Leinster Championship is a single elimination tournament. Each team is afforded only one defeat before being eliminated from the championship. Pairings for matches are drawn at random and there is no seeding.

Each match is played as a single leg. If a match is drawn there is a period of extra time, however, if both sides are still level there are penalties. Only the final, if both teams are still level after a period of extra time, goes to a replay.

=== Competition format ===
Quarter-finals: Eight teams contest this round. The four winning teams advance directly to the semi-final stage. The four losing teams are eliminated from the championship.

Semi-finals: Four teams contest this round. The two winning teams advance directly to the final. The two losing teams are eliminated from the championship.

Final: The final is contested by the two semi-final winners.

== Trophy ==
At the end of the Leinster final, the winning team is presented with a trophy. The cup, named the Alfie Hickey Memorial Cup in honour of Alfie Hickey, a St. Lachtain's hurler and Kilkenny captain, is held by the winning team until the following year's final. The winning captain accepts the cup on behalf of his team before giving a short speech. Individual members of the winning team then have an opportunity to lift the cup.

== Roll of honour ==
#	County	Winners	Runners-up	Total	Winning years	Runner-up years
1	Galway	9	5	14	2011, 2013, 2016, 2017, 2020, 2022, 2023, 2024, 2026	2012, 2014, 2015, 2018, 2019
2	Kilkenny	8	5	13	2008, 2009, 2010, 2012, 2014, 2015, 2018, 2025	2007, 2011, 2013, 2016, 2023
3	Wexford	2	5	7	2007, 2019	2008, 2009, 2017, 2022, 2025
5	Offaly	0	2	2		2024, 2026
5	Dublin	0	1	1		2020

== List of finals ==
Year	Winners	County	Score	Runners-up		Score
2007	Tara Rocks	Wexford	0-16	Mullinavat	Kilkenny	1-05
2008	Emeralds	Kilkenny	3-10	Oylegate-Glenbrien	Wexford	2-10
2009	Piltown	Kilkenny	4-18	Shamrocks	Wexford	0-05
2010	St. Martin's	Kilkenny	w/o			
2011	Ballinderreen	Galway	0-12	Lisdowney	Kilkenny	1-08
2012	Conahy Shamrocks	Kilkenny	1-11	Mícheál Breathnach	Galway	1-10
2013	Ardrahan	Galway	0-11	Kilmacow	Kilkenny	0-06
2014	St. Patrick's	Kilkenny	2-07	St. Thomas's	Galway	0-11
2015	O'Loughlin Gaels	Kilkenny	1-11	Clarinbridge	Galway	1-09
2016	Tynagh-Abbey/Duniry	Galway	1-13	Barrow Rangers	Kilkenny	0-13
2017	Kinvara	Galway	2-13	Craanford Fr. O'Regan's	Wexford	0-08
2018	John Locke's	Kilkenny	0-14	Kilnadeema–Leitrim	Galway	0-13
2019	Oylegate-Glenbrien	Wexford	2-09	Ballinderreen	Galway	0-08
2020	Loughrea	Galway	1-14	St. Vincent's	Dublin	0-15
2021	No championship					
2022	Cappataggle	Galway	0-19	Blackwater	Wexford	0-10
2023	Sarsfields	Galway	1-14	St. Martin's	Kilkenny	1-05
2024	Ballinasloe	Galway	0-22	Birr	Offaly	2-10
2025	Threecastles	Kilkenny	1-14	Kilrush-Askamore	Wexford	0-10
2026	Tommy Larkin's	Galway	1-16	St Rynagh's	Offaly	1-09

Notes:

- 2020 - The first match ended in a draw.
