= Whitechurch, County Cork =

Village in County Cork, Ireland

Whitechurch An Teampall Geal (Irish)
- Village
- Location in Ireland
- Coordinates: 51°58′53″N 8°30′50″W
- Country: Ireland
- Province: Munster
- County: County Cork

Population (2022)
  - Total: 719
- Time zone: UTC+0 (WET)
  - Summer (DST): UTC-1 (IST (WEST))

Whitechurch (Irish: An Teampall Geal) is a village and townland in County Cork, Ireland, about 11 km north of Cork city. It forms part of the Dáil constituency of Cork North-Central. As of the 2022 census, Whitechurch village had a population of 719 people. The village is in a civil parish of the same name.

== History ==
There are a number of standing stone and ringfort sites in Whitechurch townland, and the neighbouring townlands of Farranastig and Ballinvarrig. The former Church of Ireland church, now a ruin in the northwest corner of Whitechurch cemetery, was built in 1774 on the site of an earlier structure. The current Catholic church, a 20th-century building, was built on the site of an earlier 19th-century chapel. Nearby is a belfry, designed to resemble an Irish round tower, which was built c. 1833.

== Amenities ==
Within the village is a pub, shop and petrol station. To the west of the village is the local national (primary) school. As of 2022, Whitechurch National School (Scoil Phádraig Naofa) had an enrollment of 323 pupils.

The grounds of the local Gaelic Athletic Association club, Whitechurch GAA, are near the national school. Rockmount A.F.C., an amateur association football (soccer) club in the Munster Senior League, are also based in Whitechurch.
