= Munster Junior B Club Hurling Championship =

- Current season or competition: 2026 Munster Junior B Club Hurling Championship
- Irish: Craobh Iomána Sóisear B na Mumhan
- Code: Hurling
- Founded: 2005; 21 years ago
- Region: Munster (GAA)
- Trophy: Michael Fitzmaurice Memorial Cup
- No. of teams: 6
- Title holders: Ballybrown (1st title)
- Sponsors: Killeedy GAA Club

The Munster Junior B Club Hurling Championship is an annual hurling competition organised by Killeedy GAA Club in Limerick since 2005 for the champion junior B hurling teams in the province of Munster in Ireland.

The series of games are played during the winter months with the Munster final currently being played in January. The prize for the winning team is the Michael Fitzmaurice Memorial Cup. The championship has always been played on a straight knockout basis whereby once a team loses they are eliminated from the championship.

The Munster Championship is an integral part of the wider All-Ireland Junior B Club Hurling Championship. The winners and runners-up of the Munster final join the winners and runners-up of the Leinster in the semi-final stages of the All-Ireland Championship.

Ballybrown are the title-holders after defeating Silvermines by 0–18 to 0–15 in the 2025 Munster final.

== History ==
A Munster Club Championship for respective junior B champions was the idea of the Killeedy GAA Club who, after winning the Limerick JBHC title in 2005, realised there was no provincial competition in that grade of hurling. A senior championship had been running side 1965, while intermediate and junior competitions had been recently introduced by GAA President Seán Kelly. Members of the Killeedy club approached a supportive Kelly, however, their proposal was rejected by Central Council. In spite of this setback, Killeedy organised their own unofficial provincial competition for Junior B championship winners before eventually securing the official support of the Munster Council.

== The championship ==
=== Overview ===
The Munster Championship is a single elimination tournament. Each team is afforded only one defeat before being eliminated from the championship. Pairings for matches are drawn at random and there is no seeding.

Each match is played as a single leg. If a match is drawn there is a period of extra time, however, if both sides are still level there are penalties. Only the final, if both teams are still level after a period of extra time, goes to a replay.

=== Competition format ===
Quarter-finals: Four teams contest this round. The two winning teams advance directly to the semi-final stage. The two losing teams are eliminated from the championship.

Semi-finals: Four teams contest this round. The two winning teams advance directly to the final. The two losing teams are eliminated from the championship.

Final: The final is contested by the two semi-final winners.

=== Qualification ===
County	Championship	Qualifying team
Clare	Clare Junior B Hurling Championship	Champions
Cork	Cork Junior B Hurling Championship	Champions
Kerry	Kerry Junior Hurling Championship	Champions
Limerick	Limerick Junior B Hurling Championship	Champions
Tipperary	Tipperary Junior B Hurling Championship	Champions
Waterford	Waterford Junior B Hurling Championship	Champions

== Trophy ==
At the end of the Munster final, the winning team is presented with a trophy. The cup, named the Michael Fitzmaurice Memorial Cup in honour of a former Killeedy hurler, is held by the winning team until the following year's final. Traditionally, the presentation is made by a high-ranking official from the Munster Council. The winning captain accepts the cup on behalf of his team before giving a short speech. Individual members of the winning team then have an opportunity to lift the cup.

== Roll of honour ==
#	County	Winners	Runners-up	Total	Winning years	Runner-up years
1	Limerick	7	5	12	2008, 2009, 2013, 2018, 2022, 2024, 2025	2005, 2011, 2014, 2019, 2023
2	Tipperary	6	11	17	2007, 2012, 2014, 2019, 2021, 2023	2006, 2008, 2009, 2010, 2013, 2015, 2016, 2017, 2022, 2024, 2025
2	Cork	6	1	7	2005, 2006, 2010, 2015, 2016, 2017,	2007
4	Clare	1	3	4	2011	2012, 2018, 2021

== List of finals ==
Year	Winners	Score	Runners-up	Score
2005	St James'	0-20	Killeedy	2-12
2006	Dohenys	1-14	Kiladangan	3-07
2007	Ballingarry	2-12	St. Ita's	0-12
2008	Bruree	1-12	Moyne-Templetuohy	2-07
2009	St. Mary's/Seán Finns	0-14	Templederry Kenyons	0-13
2010	Doneraile	4-11	Thurles Sarsfields	1-07
2011	Clonlara	1-12	Croom	1-08
2012	Roscrea	4-05	Tubber	1-11
2013	Templeglantine	2-12	Holycross-Ballycahill	1-09
2014	Killenaule	2-11	Doon	1-13
2015	Shanballymore	0-14	Éire Óg Annacarty	1-09
2016	Whitechurch	0-17	Upperchurch–Drombane	1-11
2017	Killavullen	0-10	Thurles Sarsfields	0-05
2018	Cappamore	0-10	Inagh-Kilnamona	0-08
2019	Drom-Inch	2-23	Garryspillane	2-17
2020	No championship			
2021	Clonoulty-Rossmore	2-06	Scariff	0-10
2022	Bruff	0-10	Thurles Sarsfields	1-06
2023	Drom-Inch	3-08	Monaleen	1-13
2024	Kildimo-Pasllaskenry	3-08	Cappawhite	1-13
2025	Ballybrown	0-18	Silvermines	0-15

Notes:

- 2008 - The first match ended in a draw: Bruree 1–11, Moyne-Templetuohy 0–14.
- 2008 - The first match ended in a draw: Templeglantine 2–13, Holycross-Ballycahill, 2–13.
- 2015 - The first match ended in a draw: Shanballymore 1–12, Éire Óg Annacarty 2-09.
