= Ballybrown GAA =

Gaelic games club in County Limerick, Ireland

Ballybrown
- Baile Brún
- Founded: 1890
- County: Limerick
- Colours
- Grounds: Páirc Uí Riain,
- Coordinates: 52°37′54″N 8°43′44″W

Playing kits
Standard colours

Senior Club Championships
	All Ireland	Munster champions	Limerick champions
Hurling:	0	1	2

Ballybrown GAA is a Gaelic Athletic Association club in Clarina, County Limerick, Ireland. The club is affiliated to the Limerick County Board and fields teams in hurling, Gaelic football and camogie.

== History ==
Located in the village of Clarina, about 5 miles west of Limerick, Ballybrown GAA Club was founded in 1890. The club spent the majority of its early existence operating in the lower grades. Ballybrown had its first notable success when, in 1913, the club won the Limerick JHC title. A second title was won over half a century later in 1967, while the Limerick JAFC title was won in 1981.

Ballybrown won the Limerick SHC title for the first time in its history in September 1989, after a 4–10 to 2–09 win over Doon in the final. The Munster Club SHC title was later claimed, before Ballybrown were beaten by Ballyhale Shamrocks by 1–16 to 0–16 in the 1990 All-Ireland Club SHC final. Ballybrown won a second Limerick SHC title in 1991.

The 21st century saw Ballybrown return to the senior ranks after winning the Limerick IHC title in 2012. The club later had a number of underage successes, including a three-in-a-row of Limerick Premier MHC titles between 2019 and 2021, as well as a Limerick Premier U21HC title in 2022. Ballybrown beat Tommy Larkin's by 0–14 to 1–06 to win the All-Ireland JBHC title in March 2026.

== Honours ==
- Munster Senior Club Hurling Championship (1): 1989
- Limerick Senior Hurling Championship (2): 1989, 1991
- Limerick Intermediate Hurling Championship (1): 2012
- Limerick Junior A Hurling Championship (2): 1913, 1967
- Limerick Junior A Football Championship (1): 1981
- All-Ireland Junior B Club Hurling Championship (1): 2026
- Munster Junior B Club Hurling Championship (1): 2025
- Munster Junior B Club Football Championship (1): 2018
- Limerick Junior B Football Championship (1): 2017
- Limerick Premier Under-21 Hurling Championship (2): 1991, 2022
- Limerick Under-21 A Hurling Championship (1): 2019
- Limerick Premier Minor Hurling Championship (5): 1977, 1988, 2019, 2020, 2021

== Notable players ==
- Colin Coughlan: All-Ireland SHC-winner (2021, 2022, 2023, 2026)
- Aidan O'Connor: All-Ireland SHC-winner (2023, 2026)
- Tom Ryan: All-Ireland SHC-winner (1973)
