= All-Ireland Junior B Club Hurling Championship =

Junior B Club All Ireland Hurling Series
- Irish: Craobh Shóisireach B Iomáint Chlub na hÉireann
- Code: Hurling
- Founded: 2005
- Region: Ireland (GAA)
- Trophy: Killeedy Perpetual Cup
- No. of teams: 12–15
- Title holders: Kildimo-Pallaskenry (1st title)

The All-Ireland Junior B Club Hurling Championship, known for short as the All-Ireland Club JBHC, is an annual inter-county club hurling competition organised by Killeedy GAA club since 2006 for eligible hurling clubs. Clubs qualify for the competition based on their performance in their county club championships.

The final, usually held in February/March, serves as the culmination of a series of games played during the winter and spring months, and the results determine which county's team receives the cup. The championship has always been played on a straight knockout basis whereby once a team loses they are eliminated from the series. In the present format, it begins in October with provincial championships held in Leinster and Munster, with the four respective champions and runners-up contesting the subsequent All-Ireland series.

No team has ever won the championship on more than one occasion. Tipperary & Galway clubs have accumulated the highest number of victories, with four wins. The championship has been won by 18 different clubs. The current champions are Kildimo-Pallaskenry.

== Teams ==
=== Qualification ===
The Junior B All-Ireland Club Hurling Series features four teams in the final tournament. A number of teams contest the two provincial junior club championships with the four respective champions and runners-up automatically qualifying for the All-Ireland series.

Province	Championship	Qualifying team
Leinster	Leinster Junior B Club Hurling Championship	Champions and runners-up
Munster	Munster Junior B Club Hurling Championship	Champions and runners-up

== List of finals ==
Year	Winners	County	Score	Runners-up	County	Score	Venue
2006	St. Lachtain's	Kilkenny	2–18	St. James's	Cork	3-08	Páirc Íde Naofa
2007	Menlo Emmetts	Galway	0-16 (1-08)	Tara Rocks	Wexford	1-12 (0–11)	Páirc Íde Naofa
2008	Ballingarry	Tipperary	0–10	Emeralds-Urlingford	Kilkenny	0-08	Newtownshandrum Grounds
2009	Athenry	Galway	2-08	Bruree	Limerick	0–13	Páirc Íde Naofa
2010	St. Martin's	Kilkenny	1-14 (0–14)	St. Mary's/Seán Finn's	Limerick	2-09 (0–14)	Páirc Íde Naofa
2011	Ballinderreen	Galway	2-06	Doneraile	Cork	0-05	Páirc Íde Naofa
2012	Conahy Shamrocks	Kilkenny	0-11 (1–12)	Clonlara	Clare	0-09 (1–12)	Páirc Íde Naofa
2013	Roscrea	Tipperary	0–12	Tubber	Clare	1-08	Páirc Íde Naofa
2014	Holycross-Ballycahill	Tipperary	2-12 (2–13)	Templeglantine	Limerick	1-09 (2–13)	Páirc Íde Naofa
2015	Doon	Limerick	0–12	Killenaule	Tipperary	0–10	Páirc Íde Naofa
2016	Shanballymore	Cork	0–17	Tynagh-Abbey/Duniry	Galway	1–12	Páirc Íde Naofa
2017	Whitechurch	Cork	2–16	Upperchurch-Drombane	Tipperary	0–11	Páirc Íde Naofa
2018	Thurles Sarsfields	Tipperary	2–11	Kilnadeema-Leitrim	Galway	1–13	Páirc Íde Naofa
2019	Oylegate-Glenbrien	Wexford	1–15	Cappamore	Limerick	0–11	Páirc Íde Naofa
2020	Loughrea	Galway	1–13	St. Vincent's	Dublin	0-08	Páirc Íde Naofa
2021	No Championship						
2022	Clonoulty-Rossmore	Tipperary	3-15 (3–11)	Cappataggle	Galway	1-18 (2–14)	Páirc Íde Naofa
2023	Sarsfields	Galway	1-09	Bruff	Limerick	0-09	Páirc Íde Naofa
2024	Monaleen	Limerick	2–11	Drom & Inch	Tipperary	0-09	Páirc Íde Naofa
2025	Kildimo-Pallaskenry	Limerick	2–13	Cappawhite	Tipperary	0–10	Páirc Íde Naofa
2026	Ballybrown	Limerick	0–14	Tommy Larkin's	Galway	1-06	Páirc Íde Naofa

== Top winners ==
	County	Wins	Years won	Runners up
1	Tipperary	5	2008, 2013, 2014, 2018, 2022	2015, 2024, 2025
1	Galway	5	2007, 2009, 2011, 2020, 2023	2016, 2017, 2018, 2022, 2026
2	Limerick	4	2015, 2024, 2025, 2026	2009, 2010, 2014, 2019, 2023
3	Kilkenny	3	2006, 2010, 2012	2008
5	Cork	2	2016, 2017	2006, 2011
4	Wexford	1	2019	2007
5	Clare	0		2012, 2013
5	Dublin	0		2020

== See also ==
- All-Ireland Senior Club Hurling Championship (Tier 1)
- All-Ireland Intermediate Club Hurling Championship (Tier 2)
- All-Ireland Junior Club Hurling Championship (Tier 3)
