= 2005–06 All-Ireland Junior B Club Hurling Championship =

1st staging of the All-Ireland Junior B Club Hurling Championship

- Dates: 12 February – 2 April 2006
- Teams: 8
- Sponsor: Killeedy GAA Club
- Champions: St. Lachtain's (1st title); Tom Kelly (captain)
- Runners-up: St. James'; Damien Dooley (captain)

Tournament statistics
- Matches played: 7
- Goals scored: 23 (3.29 per match)
- Points scored: 176 (25.14 per match)

The 2005–06 All-Ireland Junior B Club Hurling Championship was the inaugural staging of the All-Ireland Junior B Club Hurling Championship since its establishment by the Killeedy GAA Club. The championship ran from 12 February to 2 April 2006.

The All-Ireland final was played on 2 April 2006 at Páirc Íde Naofa, between St. Lachtain's and St. James', in what was their first ever meeting in the final. St. Lachtain's won the match by 2–18 to 3–08 to claim their first ever All-Ireland title.

== Munster Junior B Club Hurling Championship ==
=== Munster quarter-final ===
12 February 2006 Quarter-final	St. James'	0-17 – 0-16 (aet)	Drom-Inch	Páirc Íde Naofa

=== Munster semi-finals ===
19 February 2006 Semi-final	St. James'	3-08 – 0-09	St Joseph's Doora-Barefield	Páirc Íde Naofa

26 February 2006 Semi-final	Killeedy	4-10 – 2-11	Kilgarvan	Páirc Íde Naofa

=== Munster final ===
5 March 2006 Final	Killeedy	2-12 – 0-20 (aet)	St. James'	Páirc Íde Naofa
	D Flynn 1-5, D O'Connor 1-3, P Dore 0-2, G Kelly 0-1, D O'Connor 0-1.		D Dooley 0-12, A Tobin 0-2, K O'Brien 0-2, K O'Donovan 0-2, I Evans 0-1, S McCarthy 0-1.	Referee: S McNamara

== All-Ireland Junior B Club Hurling Championship ==
=== All-Ireland semi-finals ===
19 March 2006 Semi-final	St. James'	2-14 – 2-07	Mullahoran	Páirc Íde Naofa

26 March 2006 Semi-final	St. Lachtain's	2-17 – 1-09	Oranmore-Maree	Páirc Íde Naofa

=== All-Ireland final ===
2 April 2006 Final	St. James'	3-08 – 2–18	St. Lachtain's	Páirc Íde Naofa
