= Killeedy GAA =

Gaelic clubs in Ireland

Killeedy
- Cill Íde
- Founded: 1932
- County: Limerick
- Colours: Blue and white
- Grounds: Páirc Íde Naofa

Playing kits
Standard colours

Senior Club Championships
| | All Ireland | Munster champions | Limerick champions |
|---|---|---|---|
| Hurling: | 0 | 0 | 1 |

Killeedy GAA is a Gaelic Athletic Association club located in the parish of Killeedy, County Limerick, Ireland. The club is primarily concerned with the game of hurling.

== History ==
Located in Raheenagh in the parish of Killeedy, County Limerick, Killeedy GAA Club was founded in 1932. The club has spent most of its existence operating in the junior grade, winning three Limerick JBHC titles. The club's greatest success came in 1980 when South Liberties were beaten by 2–07 to 1–07 to claim the Limerick SHC for the only time in their history.

The club has organised its own Leinster, Munster and All-Ireland JBHC competitions since 2005.

== Honours ==
- Limerick Senior Hurling Championship (1): 1980
- Limerick Intermediate Hurling Championship (1): 1992
- Limerick Junior B Football Championship (1): 1987
- Limerick Junior B Hurling Championship (3): 1988, 2005, 2010

== Notable players ==
- Paudie Fitzmaurice: All-Ireland SHC winner (1973)
- Willie Fitzmaurice: All-Ireland SHC runner-up (1980)
