= Leonard Enright =

Irish hurler (1953–2018)

Personal information
- Native name: Lionaird Mac Ionnrachtaigh (Irish)
- Born: 1 July 1953 Patrickswell, County Limerick, Ireland
- Died: 2 November 2018 (aged 65) Limerick, Ireland
- Occupation: Caretaker
- Height: 5 ft 11 in (180 cm)

Sport
- Sport: Hurling
- Position: Full-back
Club
- Years: Club
- 1971–1991: Patrickswell
Club titles
- Limerick titles: 7
- Munster titles: 2
- All-Ireland Titles: 0
Inter-county*
Years	County	Apps (scores)
1971–1988	Limerick	21 (0-02)
Inter-county titles
- Munster titles: 2
- All-Irelands: 0
- NHL: 3
- All Stars: 3
- *Inter County team apps and scores correct as of 19:55, 3 November 2018.

Leonard Enright (1 July 1953 – 2 November 2018) was an Irish hurler who played as a full-back for club side Patrickswell, at inter-county level with the Limerick senior hurling team and at inter-provincial level with Munster.

== Playing career ==
=== Patrickswell ===
Enright first played for Patrickswell at under-16 level on a team trained by Richie Bennis. He subsequently progressed onto the club's minor and under-21 teams before eventually making his breakthrough at senior level.

On 23 September 1979, Enright was at right wing-back when he won his first County Championship medal after a 2-16 to 0-16 defeat of Tournafulla in the final.

After surrendering their title and failing to make the final stage over the following two seasons, Patrickswell qualified for the final once again on 12 September 1982. Enright was at full-back for that game and won a second County Championship medal after a 0-17 to 0-15 defeat of Bruree in the final.

Enright was appointed captain of the Patrickswell senior hurling team for the 1983 season. On 11 September 1983, he won a third County Championship medal when he captained the team to a 1-13 to 1-07 defeat of Ballybrown in the final.

Patrickswell secured a third successive County Championship title on 14 October 1984, with Enright winning his fourth championship title overall after a 4-13 to 3-05 defeat of Cappamore in the final.

On 13 September 1987, Enright won a fifth County Championship medal following Patrickswell's 1-17 to 3-10 defeat of Ballybrown in the final.

Patrickswell retained the championship on 16 October 1988 following a 4-10 to 2-06 defeat of Cappamore in a final replay. It was Enright's sixth championship winners' medal. He ended the year by winning a Munster Club Championship medal after Patrickswell's 3-13 to 2-13 defeat of Mount Sion.

Enright won his seventh and final County Championship medal on 21 October 1990 after a 1-15 to 1-12 defeat of Adare. He later claimed a second Munster Club Championship medal following an 0-08 to 0-06 defeat of Éire Óg. On 17 March 1991, Patrickswell lined out against Glenmore in the All-Ireland final. Enright scored a point from play, however, Patrickswell suffered a 1-13 to 0-12 defeat.

=== Limerick ===
==== Minor and under-21 ====
Enright first played for Limerick when he was selected in goal for the minor team. He enjoyed little success in this grade before progressing onto the Limerick under-21 team in 1972. His three-year tenure in this grade also ended without championship success.

==== Senior ====
Enright made his first appearance for the Limerick senior hurling team when he lined out in goal on 7 March 1971 in a 1-17 to 2-07 defeat of Wexford in the National Hurling League. He ended the campaign by winning his first league medal as a substitute. Enright was dropped from the Limerick team at the end of 1972 and missed out on the team's All-Ireland Championship success in 1973.

After a three-year gap, Enright returned to the Limerick panel and made his Munster Championship debut at midfield in a 2-16 to 3-13 draw with Tipperary on 6 July 1975. After two seasons at midfield he became disillusioned and left the panel. Enright gave up hurling altogether, switched codes to rugby union and played with Young Munster in 1977 and 1978.

A career-ending eye injury to Pat Hartigan in 1979 paved the way for Enright's return to the Limerick senior team. He initially played in his usual position at midfield before later becoming the first-choice full-back in succession to the injured Hartigan.

On 20 July 1980, Enright won his first Munster Championship medal after a 2-14 to 2-10 defeat of reigning champions Cork in the final. This victory secured Limerick a place in the All-Ireland final against Galway on 7 September 1980. Enright played at full-back, however, in spite of a personal scoring tally of 2-07 for Éamonn Cregan, Limerick suffered a 2-15 to 3-09 defeat. Enright ended the season by winning his first All Star award.

Enright won a second successive Munster Championship medal on 5 July 1981 after a 3-12 to 2-09 defeat of Clare in the final. He ended the season with a second successive All Star award.

Enright was appointed captain of the Limerick senior team for the 1983 season. After losing the National League final to Kilkenny, Limerick's season came to an end with a Munster semi-final replay defeat by Cork. In spite of a trophy-less season, Enright ended the year by winning a third All Star award in four seasons.

After retaining the captaincy for the 1984 season, Enright guided the Limerick team to a second successive league final appearance. A 3-16 to 1-09 defeat of Wexford gave Enright a second National League medal and a first won on the field of play.

On 14 April 1985, Enright won a third National League medal following Limerick's 3-12 to 1-07 defeat of Clare in the final. It was his second successive title as captain of the team.

Enright played his last championship game for Limerick on 5 June 1988, when he captained the team to a 0-16 to 0-08 defeat by Tipperary.

=== Munster ===
Enright was first selected at full-back for the Munster team in 1981. He retained his position on the team for five successive seasons and won three Railway Cup medals during that time after defeats of Leinster in 1981 and 1984 and Connacht in 1985.

== Personal life ==
Outside of his sporting life Enright worked as a caretaker with Mary Immaculate College. He was married to Birdie and had three sons and a daughter.

Enright died at the Milford Care Centre on 2 November 2018, just hours after his induction into the GAA Hall of Fame was celebrated at the annual All Star Awards.

== Honours ==
Patrickswell

- Munster Senior Club Hurling Championship (2): 1988, 1990
- Limerick Senior Hurling Championship (7): 1979, 1982, 1983 (c), 1984, 1987, 1988, 1990

Limerick

- Munster Senior Hurling Championship (2): 1980, 1981
- National Hurling League (3): 1970-71, 1983-84 (c), 1984-85 (c)

Munster

- Railway Cup (3): 1981, 1984, 1985

Individual

- GAA Hall of Fame Inductee: 2018

Sporting positions
Preceded by Joe McKenna	Limerick Senior Hurling Captain; 1983-1985	Succeeded by Paddy Kelly
Preceded by Danny Fitzgerald	Limerick Senior Hurling Captain; 1988	Succeeded by Gary Kirby
