= Phil Bennis =

Irish hurler and manager

Personal information
- Native name: Pilib Ó Binéid (Irish)
- Born: 1942 (age 83–84) Patrickswell, County Limerick, Ireland
- Occupation: Agricultural equipment salesman
- Height: 5 ft 8 in (173 cm)

Sport
- Sport: Hurling
- Position: Centre-back
Club
- Years: Club
- 1960-1979: Patrickswell
Club titles
- Limerick titles: 6
Inter-county
Years	County	Apps (scores)
1966-1973	Limerick	13 (0-01)
Inter-county titles
- Munster titles: 1
- All-Irelands: 1
- NHL: 1
- All Stars: 0

Philip Bennis (born 1942) is an Irish hurling manager and former player. At club level, he played with Patrickswell and at inter-county level with the Limerick senior hurling team. Bennis later served as a manager at club and inter-county levels.

== Playing career ==
Bennis first played hurling and Gaelic football at juvenile and underage level with Patrickwell. His first county success was a Limerick JAFC in 1964, before claiming a second title in 1970. By that stage, Bennis had his first hurling success after captaining Patrickswell to consecutive Limerick SHC titles in 1965 and 1966. He won six SHC titles in total, with further victories in 1969, 1970, 1977, 1979.

At inter-county level, Bennis first played for the Limerick senior hurling team in 1964. He later served as team captain on three separate occasions. Bennis was part of the Limerick team that beat Tipperary by a point to win the National Hurling League title in 1971. He later won consecutive Munster SHC medals and was at right wing-back for Limerick's 1-21 to 1-14 win over Kilkenny in the 1973 All-Ireland final.

== Managerial career ==
Bennis has been involved in the majority of Patrickswell's Limerick SHC title victories, either as a player or manager or both. He guided the club to nine such triumphs between 1982 and 1997. Bennis's other club honours as manager include two Munster Club SHC title, while he also managed the team when losing to Glenmore in the 1991 All-Ireland club final.

At inter-county level, Bennis managed the Limerick minor team that beat Kilkenny to win the All-Ireland MHC title in 1984. He progressed to manage the under-21 team and won consecutive Munster U21HC titles, before steering Limerick to the All-Ireland U21HC title after a 2-15 to 3-06 win over Galway in the 1987 final. As manager of Limerick's senior team on several occasions, he won a National Hurling League title in 1992.

== Honours ==
=== Player ===
Patrickswell

- Limerick Senior Hurling Championship: 1965, 1966, 1969, 1970, 1977, 1979
- Limerick Junior A Football Championship: 1964, 1970

Limerick

- All-Ireland Senior Hurling Championship: 1973
- Munster Senior Hurling Championship: 1973, 1974
- National Hurling League: 1970–71

=== Management ===
Feenagh–Kilmeedy

- West Limerick Junior A Hurling Championship: 1987

Patrickswell

- Munster Senior Club Hurling Championship: 1988, 1990
- Limerick Senior Hurling Championship: 1982, 1983, 1984, 1987, 1988, 1990, 1995, 1996, 1997

Limerick

- National Hurling League: 1991–92
- All-Ireland Under-21 Hurling Championship: 1987
- Munster Under-21 Hurling Championship: 1986, 1987
- All-Ireland Minor Hurling Championship: 1984
- Munster Minor Hurling Championship: 1984

Sporting positions
Preceded by Johnny Hayes	Limerick senior hurling team captain 1966-1967	Succeeded by Mossie Dowling
Preceded by Éamonn Cregan	Limerick senior hurling team captain 1970	Succeeded by Tony O'Brien
Preceded by Liam O'Donoghue	Limerick senior hurling team manager 1988-1989	Succeeded by Liam O'Donoghue
Preceded by Liam O'Donoghue	Limerick senior hurling team manager 1991-1993	Succeeded by Tom Ryan
