= Tony O'Brien =

Irish hurler (1940–1989)

Personal information
- Native name: Antóin Ó Briain (Irish)
- Born: 1940 Patrickswell, County Limerick, Ireland
- Died: 12 February 1989 (aged 48) Kilmallock, County Limerick, Ireland
- Occupation: Chemist
- Height: 5 ft 9 in (175 cm)

Sport
- Sport: Hurling
- Position: Right corner-back
Club
- Years: Club
- 1957-1979: Patrickswell
Club titles
- Limerick titles: 6
College
- Years: College
- University College Cork
College titles
- Fitzgibbon titles: 0
Inter-county
- Years: County
- 1959-1972: Limerick
Inter-county titles
- Munster titles: 0
- All-Irelands: 0
- NHL: 1
- All Stars: 0

Anthony O'Brien (1940 – 12 February 1989) was an Irish hurler. At club level, he played with Patrickswell and at inter-county level with the Limerick senior hurling team.

== Playing career ==
O'Brien played hurling at all levels during his time as a student at St Munchin's College in Limerick. He was later part of University College Cork's team in the Fitzgibbon Cup. O'Brien first played for the Patrickswell club in the juvenile and underage grades and won a Limerick U16HC title in 1954.

O'Brien was still eligible for the minor grade when he won a Limerick JHC title in 1957. He later added a Limerick JFC medal to his collection, before claiming a second in 1970. By that stage, O'Brien had his first hurling success after winning consecutive Limerick SHC titles in 1965 and 1966. He won six Limerick SHC titles in total, with further victories as team captain in 1969 and 1970, as well as 1977 and 1979.

At inter-county level, O'Brien first appeared for Limerick as sub-goalkeeper on the minor team that beat Galway to win the All-Ireland MHC title in 1958. He immediately progressed to the senior team and made his first appearance in a National Hurling League game against Carlow in October 1959. O'Brien captained Limerick to the National League title in 1971.

Performances at inter-county level for Limerick resulted in O'Brien being called up to the Munster inter-provincial team. He won four Railway Cup medals in five seasons between 1966 and 1970.

== Coaching career ==
In retirement from playing, O'Brien remained active in coaching at all levels with Patrickswell. He was a selector when Patrickswell beat Mount Sion to win the Munster Club SHC title in 1988.

== Death ==
O'Brien collapsed and died while attending Patrickswell's All-Ireland semi-final defeat by O'Donovan Rossa on 12 February 1989. He was 48.

== Honours ==
=== Player ===
Patrickswell

- Limerick Senior Hurling Championship: 1965, 1966, 1969 (c), 1970 (c), 1977, 1979
- Limerick Junior Football Championship: 1964, 1970
- Limerick Junior Hurling Championship: 1957

Limerick

- National Hurling League: 1970–71 (c)
- All-Ireland Minor Hurling Championship: 1958
- Munster Minor Hurling Championship: 1958

Munster

- Railway Cup: 1966, 1968, 1969, 1970

=== Management ===
Patrickswell

- Munster Senior Club Hurling Championship: 1988
- Limerick Senior Hurling Championship: 1988

Sporting positions
Preceded by Phil Bennis	Limerick senior hurling team captain 1971	Succeeded by Jim Hogan
