= 1980 Limerick Senior Hurling Championship =

Annual hurling competition season

- Dates: 14 September – 12 October 1980
- Teams: 8
- Champions: Killeedy (1st title); Pat Meehan (captain)
- Runners-up: South Liberties; Walter Shanahan (captain)

Tournament statistics
- Matches played: 8
- Goals scored: 36 (4.5 per match)
- Points scored: 158 (19.75 per match)
- Top scorer(s): Willie Fitzmaurice (3–25)

The 1980 Limerick Senior Hurling Championship was the 86th staging of the Limerick Senior Hurling Championship since its establishment by the Limerick County Board in 1887.

Patrickswell entered the championship as the defending champions, however, they were beaten by South Liberties in the semi-final.

The final was played on 12 October 1980 at the Gaelic Grounds in Limerick, between Killeedy and South Liberties, in what was their second meeting in the final overall and a first final meeting in four years. Killeedy won the match by 2–07 to 1–07 to claim their first ever championship title.

Killeedy's Willie Fitzmaurice was the championship's top scorer with 3–25.

== Teams ==
Championship	Champions	Runners-up
Limerick City Senior Hurling Championship	Patrickswell	Claughaun
East Limerick Senior Hurling Championship	South Liberties	Doon
South Limerick Senior Hurling Championship	Dromin/Athlacca	Bruree
West Limerick Senior Hurling Championship	Tournafulla	Killeedy

== Results ==
=== Quarter-finals ===
14 September 1980 Quarter-final	South Liberties	2–10 – 0–14	Bruree	Gaelic Grounds
	J McKenna 1–2, E Grimes 0–5, M Butler 1–1, J Moynihan 0–2.		G Mullane 0–5, M Mullane 0–4, P O'Brien 0–2, D Deady 0–1, P Potter 0–1, F Lynch 0–1.

14 September 1980 Quarter-final	Doon	4–09 – 4–05	Dromin/Athlacca	Gaelic Grounds
	W Moore 2–0, T McGrath 1–2, M O'Donnell 0–5, M Thompson 1–0, J Quinlan 0–1, M Ryan 0–1.		R Guiney 1–1, T Kenny 1–1, J O'Callaghan 1–0, W Neenan 1–0, J Neenan 0–3.

14 September 1980 Quarter-final	Patrickswell	0–16 – 2–07	Tournafulla	Bruff Grounds
	R Bennis 0–8, T O'Brien 0–2, F Leahy 0–2, D Punch 0–2, P Foley 0–1, G Hayes 0–1.		S Horgan 0–4, W Hartnett 1–0, J Guiney 1–0, D O'Connor 0–2, C Carroll 0–1.

21 September 1980 Quarter-final	Killeedy	4–11 – 5–08	Claughaun	Bruff Grounds
	W Fitzmaurice 2–4, M Scanlan 1–1, P Fitzmaurice 1–1, M Fitzmaurice 0–3, J O'Connor 0–1, D O'Connor 0–1.		T Marsh 2–1, D Graham 2–0, E Cregan 1–3, D Brougham 0–1, E Tuohy 0–1, M Graham 0–1, D Fitzgerald 0–1.

28 September 1980 Quarter-final replay	Killeedy	0–13 – 0–08	Claughaun	FitzGerald Park
	W Fitzmaurice 0–8, T Mulcahy 0–2, J McGrath 0–2, D O'Connor 0–1.		E Cregan 0–6, D Brougham 0–2.

=== Semi-finals ===
28 September 1980 Semi-final	South Liberties	6–09 – 3–10	Patrickswell	FitzGerald Park
	J McKenna 4–3, P Hartigan 2–2, E Grimes 0–3, M Grimes 0–1.		R Bennis 1–5, P Bennis 1–1, F Nolan 1–0, T O'Brien 0–2, D Punch 0–1.

5 October 1980 Semi-final	Killeedy	3–14 – 0–10	Doon	FitzGerald Park
	W Fitzmaurice 1–8, D O'Connor 1–2, T Mulcahy 1–1, M Scanlan 0–1, J McGrath 0–1, D Flynn 0–1.		G McNamara 0–2, R Ryan 0–2, T McGrath 0–2, W Moore 0–1, M Ryan 0–1, J Quinlan 0–1, E Maher 0–1.

=== Final ===
12 October 1980 Final	Killeedy	2–07 – 1–07	South Liberties	Gaelic Grounds
	W Fitzmaurice 0–5, M Fitzmaurice 1–1, T Mulcahy 1–0, M Scanlon 0–1.		E Grimes 0–6, J McKenna 1–0, M Butler 0–1.	Referee: N Duggan (Rathkeale)

== Championship statistics ==
=== Top scorers ===
Rank	Player	Club	Tally	Total	Matches	Average
1	Willie Fitzmaurice	Killeedy	3–25	34	4	8.50
2	Joe McKenna	South Liberties	6–05	23	3	7.66
3	Richie Bennis	Patrickswell	1–13	16	2	8.00
4	Éamonn Grimes	South Liberties	0–14	14	3	4.66
5	Éamonn Cregan	Claughaun	1–09	12	2	6.00
