= 1987 Limerick Senior Hurling Championship =

Annual hurling competition season

- Dates: 3 July – 13 September 1987
- Teams: 27
- Champions: Patrickswell (10th title); Ger Hayes (captain); Phil Bennis (manager)
- Runners-up: Ballybrown; Tom Ryan (manager)

Tournament statistics
- Matches played: 29
- Goals scored: 95 (3.28 per match)
- Points scored: 616 (21.24 per match)
- Top scorer(s): Gary Kirby (3–36)

The 1987 Limerick Senior Hurling Championship was the 93rd staging of the Limerick Senior Hurling Championship since its establishment by the Limerick County Board in 1887. The championship ran from 3 July to 13 September 1987.

Claughaun entered the championship as the defending champions, however, they were beaten by Garryspillane in the first round.

The final was played on 13 September 1987 at the Gaelic Grounds in Limerick, between Patrickswell and Ballybrown, in what was their second meeting in the final overall and a first final meeting in four years. Patrickswell won the match by 1–17 to 3–10 to claim their 10th championship title overall and a first title in three years.

Patrickswell's Gary Kirby was the championship's top scorer with 3–36.

== Results ==
=== First round ===
3 July 1987 First round	Ardagh	1–07 – 1–07	Feoghanagh	Knockderry Grounds
	P O'Connor 0–5, M O'Connor 1–0, R Woulfe 0–1,		T Quaid (GK) 0–6, T Quaid 1–0, M Sweeney 0–1.

3 July 1987 First round	Croom	0–09 – 2–13	Hospital–Herbertstown	Bruff Grounds
	D Murray 0–6, G O'Brien 0–1, T Spillane 0–1, M Carmody 0–1.		A Garvey 0–9, M O'Shea 2–0, A Meaney 0–2, J Carroll 0–1, L Meaney 0–1.

3 July 1987 First round	Newcastle West	5–09 – 2–11	Ahane	Páirc na nGael
	S Mulvihill 3–0, S Gleeson 1–6.

4 July 1987 First round	Castletown–Ballyagran	0–04 – 5–21	South Liberties	Páirc na nGael
	N Farrell 0–3, B Cagney 0–1.		N Nash 2–4, W Shanahan 2–0, P Donnelly 0–6, M Grimes 1–2, M Nash 0–3, G McGinley 0–3, B Finn 0–2, G Fitzgerald 0–1.

4 July 1987 First round	Dromin/Athlacca	1–05 – 0–15	Kilmallock	Bruff Grounds
	N Hogan 1–3, T Kenny 0–2.		P Kelly 0–8, M Houlihan 0–3, P Tobin 0–2, L Tobin 0–2.

5 July 1987 First round	Patrickswell	2–19 – 3–05	Tournafulla	Ballingarry Grounds
	G Kirby 1–9, G Hayes 1–0, S Foley 1–0, A Carmody 0–3, S Kirby 0–3,		S O'Sullivan 1–5, C Brouder 1–0, A Reidy 1–0.

5 July 1987 First round	Ballybrown	2–13 – 2–06	Doon	FitzGerald Park
	T Kenny 1–3, M Mulqueen 1–0, P Davoren 0–2, P Mulqueen 0–2, C Keyes 0–2, J Mann 0–1, O O'Connor 0–1, T Hall 0–1, O Coughlan 0–1.		S Maher 1–1, M Kennedy 1–0, R Quigley 0–3, F Ryan 0–1, D Ryan 0–1.

5 July 1987 First round	Old Christians	1–07 – 2–08	Boher	Bruff Grounds
	P Conway 1–1, T Byrnes 0–4, G Hegarty 0–1, T Sheehan 0–1.		M Hickey 2–6, J Brouder 0–2.

5 July 1987 First round	Bruree	3–11 – 1–08	Shannon Gaels	Páirc na nGael
	J O'Brien 3–3, D Mullane 0–3, M Mullane 0–2, P Potter 0–1, D McCarthy 0–1, D Deady 0–1.		P Moloney 1–0, D Sheehan 0–3, E Nicholas 0–2, G Collins 0–2, J O'Neill 0–1.

5 July 1987 First round	Mungret	3–11 – 2–14	Adare	Páirc na nGael
	S McCarthy 1–2, C Hehir 0–4, G O'Brien 1–0, M Keating 1–0, S McGrath 0–3, C Keating 0–1, D Keating 0–1.		M Benson 1–8, M Alfred 0–4, V Buckley 1–0, PJ Kinnevane 0–1, D Marron 0–1.

5 July 1987 First round	Claughaun	0–06 – 1–08	Garryspillane	FitzGerald Park
	D Fitzgerald 0–2, G Ryan 0–1, D Boylan 0–1, L O'Connor 0–1, P Loughran 0–1.		R Sampson 1–6, J Meade 0–1, B Carroll 0–1.

19 July 1987 First round replay	Mungret	1–04 – 1–16	Adare	Páirc na nGael
	C Hehir 1–0, G O'Brien 0–1, S McCarthy 0–1, N Sexton 0–1, L O'Donoghue 0–1.		M Benson 0–7, D Marron 1–1, S Fitzgibbon 0–2, Tom Dunne 0–2, M Dundon 0–1, M Alfred 0–1, V Buckley 0–1, B Kennedy 0–1.

19 July 1987 First round replay	Ardagh	3–12 – 0–07	Feoghanagh	Knockderry Grounds

- Fedamore, Killeedy, Blackrock, Bruff and Cappamore received byes in this round.

=== Second round ===
17 July 1987 Second round	Fedamore	0–10 – 1–13	Killeedy	Ballingarry Grounds
	S O'Dwyer 0–4, S Fitzgibbon 0–3, P O'Callaghan 0–1, J Prenderville 0–1, J Dineen 0–1.		K O'Kelly 0–5, J Mulcahy 1–0, T Murphy 0–2, J Magnier 0–2, P Fitzmaurice 0–1, E Liggane 0–1, W Fitzmaurice 0–1, S Forde 0–1.

17 July 1987 Second round	Ballybrown	1–14 – 1–06	Boher	Bruff Grounds
	C Keyes 0–6, P Mulqueen 1–0, O O'Connor 0–2, T Kenny 0–2, C Coughlan 0–1, G Lynch 0–1, T Hall 0–1, P Davoren 0–1.		M Hickey 1–4, J Brouder 0–1, T Hickey 0–1.

18 July 1987 Second round	Newcastle West	2–08 – 2–14	Kilmallock	Dromcollogher Grounds
	L Cremin 1–3, J McMahon 1–2, D Cremin 0–1, W Keane 0–1, T Doody 0–1.		P Kelly 1–9, B Guiney 1–0, G Carroll 0–2, L Tobin 0–1, D Barry 0–1, M Houlihan 0–1.

19 July 1987 Second round	Blackrock	4–06 – 1–11	Bruff	FitzGerald Park
	P Heffernan 1–5, P McGrath 1–1, K Fitzgerald 1–0, D O'Sullivan 1–0.		R O'Leary 0–8, B Horan 1–1, G Hayes 0–1, S O'Connell 0–1.

19 July 1987 Second round	South Liberties	3–10 – 3–06	Hospital–Herbertstown	Bruff Grounds
	P Donnelly 2–2, E Grimes 1–1, N Nash 0–2, B Finn 0–1, M Fitzgerald 0–1, M Nash 0–1, M Butler 0–1, W Shanahan 0–1.		A Garvey 0–6, L Garvey 1–0, PJ Garvey 1–0, A Meaney 1–0.

19 July 1987 Second round	Garryspillane	1–10 – 1–11	Bruree	FitzGerald Park
	B Stapleton 1–5, R Sampson 0–2, B Carroll 0–1, K Walsh 0–1, J Murnane 0–1.		D McCarthy 1–1, G Mullane 0–3, D Deady 0–3, P Potter 0–2, M Barron 0–1, J O'Brien 0–1.

26 July 1987 Second round	Cappamore	2–08 – 1–08	Ardagh	FitzGerald Park
	L O'Brien 1–5, P McKenna 1–0, J McCarthy 0–1, B Hammersley 0–1, D Mulcahy 0–1.		M O'Connor 1–5, P O'Connor 0–3.

31 July 1987 Second round	Patrickswell	1–13 – 1–08	Adare	Bruff Grounds
	G Kirby 1–7, S Kirby 0–2, D Punch 0–1, A Carmody 0–1, S Foley 0–1, L Foley 0–1.		M Benson 1–6, D Marron 0–1, P Kinavan 0–1.

=== Quarter-finals ===
9 August 1987 Quarter-final	Kilmallock	6–10 – 2–11	South Liberties	Bruff Grounds
	D Barry 3–1, G O'Brien 1–3, P Kelly 1–2, M Houlihan 1–1, L Tobin 0–2, J Connery 0–1.		B Finn 1–5, P Donnelly 1–1, M Nash 0–2, J McGinley 0–1, M Grimes 0–1, N Nash 0–1.

9 August 1987 Quarter-final	Ballybrown	1–15 – 2–12	Bruree	Bruff Grounds
	C Keyes 1–3, P Davoren 0–5, J Mann 0–2, O O'Connor 0–2, C Coughlan 0–1, M Mulqueen 0–1, P Hartigan 0–1.		D Mullane 1–2, G Mullane 1–1, D Deady 0–4, P Potter 0–1, M Mullane 0–1, J Lyons 0–1.

14 August 1987 Quarter-final replay	Ballybrown	1–16 – 2–10	Bruree	Bruff Grounds
	P Davoren 0–5, O O'Connor 0–4, O Coughlan 1–0, T Kenny 0–3, C Keyes 0–2, M Mulqueen 0–1, T Hall 0–1.		D Deady 0–7, J O'Brien 1–2, G Mullane 1–1.

15 August 1987 Quarter-final	Patrickswell	0–21 – 3–08	Cappamore	FitzGerald Park
	G Kirby 0–8, S Kirby 0–5, P Foley 0–3, A Carmody 0–2, G Bourke 0–2, F Nolan 0–1.		L O'Brien 0–5, N Sheehan 1–1, P McKenna 1–0, R Hammersley 1–0, D Mulcahy 0–1, G Sheehan 0–1.

16 August 1987 Quarter-final	Killeedy	2–15 – 2–07	Blackrock	Bruff Grounds
	G Forde 2–0, K Kelly 0–5, P Fitzmaurice 0–5, W Fitzmaurice 0–3, J O'Connor 0–1, J Mulcahy 0–1.		P Heffernan 1–1, P McCarthy 1–0, E O'Keeffe 0–2, M McCarthy 0–2, J O'Neill 0–1, K Fitzgerald 0–1.

=== Semi-finals ===
23 August 1987 Semi-final	Ballybrown	0–19 – 0–10	Kilmallock	Bruff Grounds
	T Kenny 0–5, P Davoren 0–5, C Keyes 0–5, O O'Connor 0–2, P Hartigan 0–1, M Mulqueen 0–1.		P Kelly 0–7, L Tobin 0–1, M Houlihan 0–1, J Neenan 0–1.

30 August 1987 Semi-final	Patrickswell	1–15 – 0–08	Killeedy	FitzGerald Park
	G Kirby 1–6, P Foley 0–3, G Hayes 0–2, A Carmody 0–2, D Punch 0–1, L Foley 0–1.		K Kelly 0–5, J O'Connor 0–1, W Fitzmaurice 0–1, T Murphy 0–1.

=== Final ===
13 September 1987 Final	Patrickswell	1–17 – 3–10	Ballybrown	Gaelic Grounds
	G Kirby 0–6, G Hayes 1–2, F Nolan 0–4, P Foley 0–2, S Kirby 0–1, A Carmody 0–1, S Carey 0–1.		C Keyes 1–6, O Coughlan 1–0, P Davoren 1–0, T Kenny 0–3, P Hartigan 0–1.	Referee: R Moloney (Kilmallock)

== Championship statistics ==
=== Top scorers ===
Rank	Player	Club	Tally	Total	Matches	Average
1	Gary Kirby	Patrickswell	3–36	45	5	9.00
2	Paddy Kelly	Kilmallock	2–26	32	4	8.00
3	Christy Keyes	Ballybrown	2–24	30	6	5.00
4	Mike Benson	Adare	2–21	27	3	9.00
5	Pat Davoren	Ballybrown	1–18	21	6	3.50
