= List of Munster Senior Hurling Championship winning managers =

This is a list of Munster Senior Hurling Championship winning managers. The term manager (or coach) only came into widespread use in the 1970s. Up until then hurling teams were usually run by selection panels. Sometimes they contained up to ten members, resulting in self-interest coming to the fore more often than not. All this changed with the appointment of a strong manager, surrounded by a small group of selectors.

== By year ==
Date	Championship	Winning manager	Team	Opponent	Losing manager	Score	Site
4 July	1993	Babs Keating (5)	Tipperary	Clare	Len Gaynor	3-27 : 2-12	Gaelic Grounds, Limerick
10 July	1994	Tom Ryan	Limerick	Clare	Len Gaynor	0-25 : 2-10	Semple Stadium, Thurles
9 July	1995	Ger Loughnane	Clare	Limerick	Tom Ryan	1-17 : 0-11	Semple Stadium, Thurles
14 July (Replay)	1996	Tom Ryan (2)	Limerick	Tipperary	Tom Fogarty	4-7 : 0-16	Páirc Uí Chaoimh, Cork
6 July	1997	Ger Loughnane (2)	Clare	Tipperary	Len Gaynor	1-18 : 0-18	Páirc Uí Chaoimh, Cork
19 July (Replay)	1998	Ger Loughnane (3)	Clare	Waterford	Gerald McCarthy	2-16 : 0-10	Semple Stadium, Thurles
4 July	1999	Jimmy Barry-Murphy	Cork	Clare	Ger Loughnane	1-15 : 0-14	Semple Stadium, Thurles
2 July	2000	Jimmy Barry-Murphy (2)	Cork	Tipperary	Nicky English	0-23 : 3-12	Semple Stadium, Thurles
1 July	2001	Nicky English	Tipperary	Limerick	Éamonn Cregan	2-16 : 1-17	Páirc Uí Chaoimh, Cork
30 June	2002	Justin McCarthy	Waterford	Tipperary	Nicky English	2-23 : 3-12	Páirc Uí Chaoimh, Cork
29 June	2003	Dónal O'Grady	Cork	Waterford	Justin McCarthy	3-16 : 3-12	Semple Stadium, Thurles
27 June	2004	Justin McCarthy	Waterford	Cork	Dónal O'Grady	3-16 : 1-21	Semple Stadium, Thurles
26 June	2005	John Allen	Cork	Tipperary	Ken Hogan	1-21 : 1-16	Páirc Uí Chaoimh, Cork
25 June	2006	John Allen (2)	Cork	Tipperary	Babs Keating	2-14 : 1-14	Semple Stadium, Thurles
8 July	2007	Justin McCarthy	Waterford	Limerick	Richie Bennis	3-17 : 1-14	Semple Stadium, Thurles
13 July	2008	Liam Sheedy	Tipperary	Clare	Mike McNamara	2-21 : 0-19	Gaelic Grounds, Limerick
12 July	2009	Liam Sheedy (2)	Tipperary	Waterford	Davy Fitzgerald	4-14 : 2-16	Semple Stadium, Thurles
17 July (Replay)	2010	Davy Fitzgerald	Waterford	Cork	Denis Walsh	1-16 : 1-13	Semple Stadium, Thurles
10 July	2011	Declan Ryan	Tipperary	Waterford	Michael Ryan	7-19 : 0-19	Páirc Uí Chaoimh, Cork
15 July	2012	Declan Ryan (2)	Tipperary	Waterford	Michael Ryan	2-17 : 0-16	Páirc Uí Chaoimh, Cork
14 July	2013	John Allen (3)	Limerick	Cork	Jimmy Barry-Murphy	0-24 : 0-15	Gaelic Grounds, Limerick
13 July	2014	Jimmy Barry-Murphy (3)	Cork	Limerick	T. J. Ryan	2-24 : 0-24	Páirc Uí Chaoimh, Cork
12 July	2015	Éamonn O'Shea	Tipperary	Waterford	Derek McGrath	0-21 : 0-16	Semple Stadium, Thurles
10 July	2016	Michael Ryan	Tipperary	Waterford	Derek McGrath	5-19 : 0-13	Gaelic Grounds, Limerick
