= 1977 Limerick Senior Hurling Championship =

Annual hurling competition season

- Dates: 11 September – 13 November 1977
- Teams: 8
- Champions: Patrickswell (5th title); David Punch (captain)
- Runners-up: Killeedy

Tournament statistics
- Matches played: 9
- Goals scored: 21 (2.33 per match)
- Points scored: 155 (17.22 per match)
- Top scorer(s): Éamonn Grimes (1–19)

The 1977 Limerick Senior Hurling Championship was the 83rd staging of the Limerick Senior Hurling Championship since its establishment by the Limerick County Board in 1887. The championship ran from 11 September to 13 November 1977.

South Liberties entered the championship as the defending champions, however, they were beaten by Patrickswell in a semi-final replay.

The final was played on 13 November 1977 at the Gaelic Grounds in Limerick, between Patrickswell and Killleedy, in what was their first ever meeting in the final. Patrickswell won the match by 3–07 to 0–07 to claim their fifth championship title overall and a first title in seven years.

Éamonn Grimes was the championship's top scorer with 1–19.

== Teams ==
Championship	Champions	Runners-up
Limerick City Senior Hurling Championship	Patrickswell	Claughaun
East Limerick Senior Hurling Championship	South Liberties	Kilteely-Dromkeen
South Limerick Senior Hurling Championship	Bruree	Bruff
West Limerick Senior Hurling Championship	Killeedy	Tournafulla

== Results ==
=== Quarter-finals ===
11 September 1977 Quarter-final	Killeedy	2–13 – 1–09	Bruff	Gaelic Grounds
	P Fitzmaurice 2–2, W Fitzmaurice 0–4, D Flynn 0–3, M Fitzmaurice 0–2, T Mulcahy 0–1, C Herbert 0–1.		G Hayes 1–5, D Kiely 0–2, M Hehir 0–1, A Gubbins 0–1.

11 September 1977 Quarter-final	Tournafulla	0–08 – 0–07	Bruree	Gaelic Grounds
	D O'Connor 0–3, G Sweeney 0–1, W Hartnett 0–1, M Hartnett 0–1, C Brouder 0–1, S O'Sullivan 0–1.		G Mullane 0–5, P O'Brien 0–1, M Barron 0–1.

2 October 1977 Quarter-final	South Liberties	2–15 – 3–07	Claughaun	FitzGerald Park
	E Grimes 1–10, D O'Sullivan 1–0, H Ryan 0–2, M Grimes 0–1, M O'Brien 0–1, J McKenna 0–1.		E Cregan 1–6, E Tuohy 1–1, J O'Halloran 1–0.

2 October 1977 Quarter-final	Patrickswell	1–07 – 1–05	Kilteely-Dromkeen	FitzGerald Park
	R Bennis 0–5, T Bennis 1–0, S Foley 0–1, J Lynch 0–1.		E McGrath 1–0, John McCarthy 0–2, P Murphy 0–1, B O'Loughlin 0–1, Jack McCarthy 0–1.

=== Semi-finals ===
9 October 1977 Semi-final	Killeedy	2–09 – 2–09	Tournafulla	Newcastle West Grounds
	W Fitzmaurice 1–3, G Forde 1–1, M Sheehan 0–2, M Fitzmaurice 0–1, P Fitzmaurice 0–1, D Flynn 0–1.		D O'Connor 1–4, P O'Sullivan 1–0, C Brouder 0–2, S O'Sullivan 0–1, S Herbert 0–1, W Herbert 0–1.

16 October 1977 Semi-final	Patrickswell	0–10 – 1–07	South Liberties	Gaelic Grounds
	R Bennis 0–4, L Foley 0–2, Peter Bennis 0–1, F Nolan 0–1, J Lynch 0–1, S Foley 0–1.		E Grimes 0–4, T Ryan 1–0, D O'Sullivan 0–1, P Hartigan 0–1, J Moynihan 0–1.

23 October 1977 Semi-final replay	Killeedy	1–11 – 1–07	Tournafulla	Newcastle West Grounds
	W Cronin 1–3, W Fitzmaurice 0–6, T Mulcahy 0–1, P Fitzmaurice 0–1.		D O'Connor 1–5, C Brouder 0–1, W Hartnett 0–1.

30 October 1977 Semi-final replay	Patrickswell	0–12 – 1–05	South Liberties	Gaelic Grounds
	R Bennis 0–7, F Nolan 0–4, Peter Bennis 0–1.		E Grimes 0–5, J McKenna 1–0.

=== Final ===
13 November 1977 Final	Patrickswell	3–07 – 0–07	Killeedy	Gaelic Grounds
	Peter Bennis 2–2, F Nolan 1–0, R Bennis 0–3, D Punch 0–1, S Foley 0–1.		D Flynn 0–3, W Fitzmaurice 0–1, D O'Connor 0–1, M Shiels 0–1, M Fitzmaurice 0–1.

== Championship statistics ==
=== Top scorers ===
Rank	Player	Club	Tally	Total	Matches	Average
1	Éamonn Grimes	South Liberties	1–19	22	3	7.33
2	Richie Bennis	Patrickswell	0–19	19	4	4.75
3	Dan O'Connor	Tournafulla	2–12	18	3	6.00
4	Willie Fitzmaurice	Killeedy	1–14	17	4	4.25
5	Peter Bennis	Patrickswell	2–04	10	4	2.50
5	Paudie Fitzmaurice	Killeedy	2–04	10	4	2.25
