= Tournafulla =

Village in County Limerick, Ireland

Tournafulla Tuar na Fola (Irish)
- Village
- Location in Ireland
- Coordinates: 52°22′03″N 9°08′50″W
- Country: Ireland
- Province: Munster
- County: County Limerick
- Local electoral area: Newcastle West
- Dáil constituency: Limerick County
- EU Parliament: South
- Elevation: 181 m (594 ft)

Population (2022)
  - Total: 204
- Time zone: UTC+0 (WET)
  - Summer (DST): UTC-1 (IST (WEST))
- Irish Grid Reference: R205240

Tournafulla, or Toornafulla (Irish: Tuar na Fola, meaning 'animal-enclosure of blood'), is a village in the southwest of County Limerick, Ireland. Tournafulla is a long single-street village. It has a Catholic church, a primary school, three pubs, a community hall and a GAA pitch. As of the 2022 census, the village had a population of 204 people.

== Geography ==
By road, Tournafulla is 11 km from Abbeyfeale, 13 km from Newcastle West and 56 km from Limerick city. The village is one half of the parish of Tournafulla/Mountcollins which was formed in 1838. Surrounding parishes include Killeedy to the east, Monagea to the northeast, Templeglantine to the north, Abbeyfeale to the west, Meelin/Rockchapel, County Cork to the south and Brosna, County Kerry to the southwest. It is surrounded by hills to the north and the Mullaghareirk Mountains to the south. Woods covered most of Tournafulla until the 17th century. The Irish language was still the main language up until the 1910s.

The three counties of Limerick, Cork and Kerry converge at a point in the parish of Tournafulla/Mountcollins. A plaque has been placed at the River Feale to mark this point. Within a few miles of the parish are the villages of Rockchapel, County Cork, and Brosna, which is the converging point of the three counties.

There is minimal public transport. There are occasional Local Link buses to Newcastle West.

=== Townlands ===
There are twenty townlands in the Tournafulla/Mountcollins parish:

- Acres
- Ballycommane
- Caherlevoy
- Clenglass North
- Clenglass South
- Glengort North
- Glengort South
- Glenmore East
- Glenmore West
- Gortnaskehy
- Killaculleen
- Knockcoolkeare
- Knocknadiha
- Mauricetown
- Mountcollins
- Reanagillee
- Seeconglass
- Tooreennagreana
- Tournafulla Lower
- Tournafulla Upper

== Community centre ==
Halla Tadhg Gaelach, the local community centre was officially opened in 2001. Partly funded by the people of Turnafulla to the amount of £200,000, it was dedicated to the local poet Tadhg Gaelach Ó Súilleabháin. The hall hosts music classes, indoor bowls, meetings and cards while on a monthly basis, there is a ceili.

== Sport and culture ==
The local hurling club is Tournafulla GAA. The club was founded in 1900 and a year later club man Tim Doody won an All-Ireland Senior Hurling Championship with London. Séamus Horgan was the goalkeeper on the Limerick team that won the 1973 All-Ireland, Limerick's last, until 2018. The club won many West Senior Hurling titles and built up a close rivalry with neighbours Killeedy. Tour reached the County Senior Hurling Championship final in 1979, but lost to Patrickswell. The club currently compete at Junior A level and footballers from the area play with Mountcollins who are currently Intermediate.

Tournafulla is located in the Sliabh Luachra area of Irish traditional music around the Cork, Limerick and Kerry borders. The local Comhaltas Ceoltóirí Éireann branch is called CCÉ Tuar na Fola and they compete in County, Munster and All-Ireland Fleadhanna along with Scór and wrenboys. Céilithe are held every few weeks in Halla Tadhg Gaelach in Tournafulla.

== Wind turbines ==
Airtricity installed an 18-turbine, 27 MW wind farm in Tournafulla, which was installed in two phases between 2006 and 2008. Phase one consists of a 5-turbine, 7.5 MW wind farm which will provide power for over 4,500 homes, mitigating around 20,000 tonnes of carbon dioxide per annum. Phase two consists of a further 13 turbines which will provide power for over 10,000 homes, mitigating around 44,000 tonnes of carbon dioxide per year.

== Notable people ==
- Saint Ita was born in County Waterford around 480. She founded a monastery at Cluain Chreadhail, present day Killeedy, and became known as Brigid of Munster. An old legend was that she once cursed the people of Tournafulla when she was taking her donkeys to the monastery farm at Seeconglass near Mountcollins. The people of Tournafulla set their dogs on her donkeys who ran away. Upon catching up with her donkeys, she discovered that one of the donkeys was lame from a thorn stuck in its foot. St. Ita removed it and planted it near her convent where it grew into a thorn bush. It is alleged that her footprint, and that of her donkey, were left near where the Allaghaun and Skule rivers meet in Upper Tournafulla and those with ailments could be cured once they placed their feet in the footprints.
- Tadhg Gaelach Ó Súilleabháin (c. 1715 – 1795), 18th century composer of both Christian poetry and Irish bardic poetry in Munster Irish.

== See also ==
- List of towns and villages in Ireland
