= 1989 All-Ireland Senior Club Hurling Championship final =

1989 All-Ireland Senior Club Hurling Championship Final
- Event: 1988–89 All-Ireland Senior Club Hurling Championship
Buffers Alley	O'Donovan Rossa
2-12	0-12
- Date: 17 March 1989
- Venue: Croke Park, Dublin
- Referee: Willie Horgan (Cork)
- Attendance: 9,158

The 1989 All-Ireland Senior Club Hurling Championship final was a hurling match played at Croke Park on 17 March 1989 to determine the winners of the 1988–89 All-Ireland Senior Club Hurling Championship, the 19th season of the All-Ireland Senior Club Hurling Championship, a tournament organised by the Gaelic Athletic Association for the champion clubs of the four provinces of Ireland. The final was contested by Buffers Alley of Wexford and O'Donovan Rossa of Antrim, with Buffers Alley winning by 2–12 to 0–12.

The All-Ireland final was a unique occasion as it was the first ever championship meeting between Buffer's Alley and O'Donovan Rossa. It remains their only championship meeting at this level. Both sides were hoping to make history by winning their first All-Ireland title.

O'Donovan Rossa took a five-point lead, however, they were eventually reeled in, starting with a Séamus O'Leary goal. The goalkeeping heroics of veteran Henry Butler saved Buffer's Alley on more than one occasion, while full-forward Tony Doran, in his 43rd year, greatly contributed to the victory.

Victory for Buffer's Alley secured their first All-Ireland title. They became the 13th club to win the All-Ireland title, while they remain the only Wexford representatives to claim the ultimate prize.

== Match ==
=== Details ===
17 March 1989

Buffers Alley	2-12 - 0-12	O'Donovan Rossa
P Donoghue 1-1, T Dempsey 0-4 (2f and 1 '70'), S Ó Laoire 1-0, T Doran 0-3, M Butler 0-2 (2f), S Whelan 0-1, M Foley 0-1.		C Barr 0-5, N Murray 0-2 (2f), J Reilly 0-1, C Murphy 0-1, P Rogan 0-1, D Armstrong 0-1, A Murray 0-1 (1f).

Croke Park, Dublin
Attendance: 9,158
Referee: W Horgan (Cork)

Buffers Alley	O'Donovan Rossa
