= 1966 Limerick Senior Hurling Championship =

Annual hurling competition season

- Champions: Patrickswell (2nd title); Phil Bennis (captain)
- Runners-up: St. Patrick's

The 1966 Limerick Senior Hurling Championship was the 72nd staging of the Limerick Senior Hurling Championship since its establishment by the Limerick County Board.

Patrickswell were the defending champions.

On 30 October 1966, Patrickswell won the championship after a 5–11 to 3–07 defeat of St. Patrick's in the final. It was their second championship title overall and their second title in succession.

== Results ==
=== Final ===
30 October 1966 Final	Patrickswell	5–11 – 3–07	St. Patrick's	Gaelic Grounds
	G Casey 3–3, R Bennis 1–5, P Carey 1–1, T O'Brien 0–2.		B Cobbe 1–2, V Cobbe 1–1, E Ryan 1–1, B Cross 0–1, J McDonagh 0–1, P Cobbe 0–1.	Referee: J Quaid (Feohanagh)
