= Séamus Horgan =

Irish hurler

Personal information
- Native name: Séamus Ó hOrgáin (Irish)
- Born: 1946 (age 79–80) Tournafulla, County Limerick, Ireland
- Height: 5 ft 11 in (180 cm)

Sport
- Sport: Hurling
- Position: Goalkeeper
Club
- Years: Club
- 1964-1994: Tournafulla
Club titles
- Limerick titles: 0
Inter-county
Years	County	Apps (scores)
1973-1976	Limerick	9 (0-00)
Inter-county titles
- Munster titles: 2
- All-Irelands: 1
- NHL: 0
- All Stars: 0

Séamus Horgan (born 1946) is an Irish retired hurler who played as a goalkeeper for the Limerick senior team.

Horgan made his first appearance for the team during the 1972-73 National League and was a regular member of the starting fifteen until his retirement after the 1976. During that time he won one All-Ireland Senior Hurling Championship winners' medal and two Munster winners' medals.

At club level Horgan played with Tournafulla in a career that spanned four decades.

== Playing career ==
=== Club ===
Horgan played his club hurling with his local Tournafulla club. He enjoyed some success as he minded the Tournafulla net for four decades. One of his last games was a county final at intermediate level in 1994 when Horgan was 48 years old.

=== Inter-county ===
Horgan first came to prominence as a member of the Limerick senior inter-county team in the early 1970s. He took over in the number one position in the 1972-73 National Hurling League which Limerick lost to Wexford. In spite of this loss Limerick went on to win the Munster Championship for the first time since 1955, giving Horgan his first provincial medal. Limerick later faced Kilkenny in the All-Ireland final, however, the Munster champions were burdened with the underdogs tag. In spite of this Limerick powered to a seven-point victory, giving Horgan an All-Ireland medal.

In 1974 Horgan won a second consecutive Munster title before lining out in a second consecutive All-Ireland final. Once again Kilkenny provided the opposition. Limerick stormed to an early lead, however, a Pat Delaney shot from midfield bounced on the wet Croke Park surface and between Horgan's legs for a goal. Two more goals for Kilkenny put an end to Limerick's hopes of victory as 'the Cats' emerged the winners by twelve points.

Horgan continued hurling at inter-county level until 1976 when he was replaced by Tommy Quaid.

=== Inter-provincial ===
Horgan was sub-goalkeeper to Séamus Durack on the Munster team that lost the Railway Cup final to Leinster in 1974.
