= 1984 Limerick Senior Hurling Championship =

Annual hurling competition season

- Dates: 9 June – 14 October 1984
- Teams: 27
- Champions: Patrickswell (9th title); John O'Brien (captain); Phil Bennis (manager)
- Runners-up: Cappamore; Mike Lonergan (captain); Donie Flynn (manager)

The 1984 Limerick Senior Hurling Championship was the 90th staging of the Limerick Senior Hurling Championship since its establishment by the Limerick County Board.

Patrickswell were the defending champions.

On 14 October 1984, Patrickswell won the championship after a 4–13 to 3–05 defeat of Cappamore in the final. It was their ninth championship title overall and their third title in succession.

== Results ==
=== First round ===
9 June 1984 First round	Blackrock	4–08 – 1–07	Monaleen	Bruff Grounds

9 June 1984 First round	Kilmallock	2–08 – 2–08	Newcastle West	Dromcollogher Grounds

10 June 1984 First round	Feohanagh	1–10 – 2–05	Ahane	Bruff Grounds
	P O'Mahony 1–2, T Quaid 0–5, E Walsh 0–1, M Mullane 0–1, J Flanagan 0–1.		S Ryan 1–0, L Moynihan 1–0, T Murnane 0–3, E Meskell 0–1, MJ Aherne 0–1.

10 June 1984 First round	Killeedy	0–12 – 1–06	Ballingarry	Dromcollogher Grounds

10 June 1984 First round	Old Christians	3–12 – 0–03	Croom	FitzGerald Park

10 June 1984 First round	Mungret/St Paul's	3–11 – 2–07	Hospital-Herbertstown	Croom Grounds
	C Hehir 1–7, T Byrnes 1–0, F Fahy 0–2, J Kirby 0–1, L O'Donoghue 0–1.		L Garvey 2–1, A Garvey 0–4, D O'Leary 0–1, P O'Connell 0–1.

10 June 1984 First round	Claughaun	3–24 – 1–08	Granagh	FitzGerald Park

17 June 1984 First round	Fedamore	5–13 – 2–11	Doon	Fr Hayes Memorial Park

17 June 1984 First round	Adare	1–11 – 1–10	Tournafulla	Newcastle West Grounds

17 June 1984 First round	Dromin/Athlacca	3–10 – 1–03	St Patrick's	Bruff Grounds

17 June 1984 First round	Patrickswell	0–18 – 2–07	South Liberties	Bruff Grounds
	G Kirby 0–6, R Bennis 0–3, F Nolan 0–3, G Burke 0–3, P Carey 0–1, S Kirby 0–1, David Punch 0–1.		B Finn 0–5, E Grimes 1–0, L Dooley 0–1, M Fitzgerald 0–1, N Nash 0–1.

24 June 1984 First round replay	Kilmallock	1–15 – 1–10	Newcastle West	Gaelic Grounds
	D O'Riordan 1–4, P Kelly 0–7, J Neenan 0–3, T O'Riordan 0–1.		J McMahon 0–5, T Kelly 1–0, M Sammon 0–2, D Cremins 0–2, M Mulcahy 0–1.

=== Second round ===
30 June 1984 Second round	Dromin/Athlacca	1–06 – 2–15	Claughaun	Croom Grounds
	G Moynihan 1–0, M O'Leary 0–3 G Mulcahy 0–2, D Enright 0–1.		M Hogan 1–1, T Synnott 1–1, T Marsh 0–4, M Molyneaux 0–3, E Cregan 0–2, G Ryan 0–2, D Fitzgerald 0–1, M Ryan 0–1.

30 June 1984 Second round	Bruree	1–11 – 2–12	Bruff	FitzGerald Park
	P O'Brien 1–1, D Mullane 0–4, G Randles 0–3, S Lyons 0–1, M Mullane 0–1, P Potter 0–1.		R O'Leary 1–2, P Reale 1–0, W Bulfin 0–3, G Browne 0–3, M Hehir 0–3, V Donovan 0–1.

1 July 1984 Second round	Mungret/St Paul's	1–15 – 3–09	Blackrock	Bruff Grounds
	T Byrnes 1–1, L O'Donoghue 0–4, C Hehir 0–3, D Keating 0–3, J Keating 0–2, P Tobin 0–2.		E McGrath 1–7, J O'Neill 1–1, P McCarthy 0–1.

1 July 1984 Second round	Patrickswell	2–12 – 1–06	Killeedy	FitzGerald Park
	R Bennis 1–3, S Kirby 1–1, G Kirby 0–3, L Foley 0–2, G Burke 0–1, Dom Punch 0–1, A Carmody 0–1.		J McGrath 1–0, W Fitzmaurice 0–2, D Flynn 0–2, G Magner 0–1, J O'Connor 0–1.

1 July 1984 Second round	Ballybrown	2–11 – 3–08	Boher	Bruff Grounds
	T Kenny 0–5, T Hall 1–1, E Cliffe 1–0, J Mann 0–2, O O'Connor 0–2, P Hartigan 0–1.		T Hickey 2–4, P O'Malley 1–0, B Laffan 0–2, B Quirke 0–1, I Walsh 0–1.

1 July 1984 Second round	Cappamore	1–13 – 2–10	Feohanagh	FitzGerald Park
	L O'Brien 0–5, E Sheehan 0–4, J Hayes 1–0, J Sheehan 0–1, N Sheehan 0–1, D Mulcahy 0–1, P Creamer 0–1.		T Quaid 1–7, J Noonan 1–0, P O'Mahony 0–2, J Flanagan 0–1.

1 July 1984 Second round	Fedamore	5–08 – 3–09	Adare	Croom Grouds

1 July 1984 Second round	Old Christians	1–06 – 1–11	Kilmallock	Croom Grouds
	J Hegarty 0–4, P Howard 1–0, T Sheehan 0–1, N O'Brien 0–1.		P Kelly 0–10, P Nelligan 1–0, J Neenan 0–1.

8 July 1984 Second round replay	Mungret/St Paul's	2–11 – 2–10	Blackrock	Bruff Grounds

8 July 1984 Second round replay	Ballybrown	1–19 – 3–07	Boher	Gaelic Grounds
	T Kenny 1–9, O O'Connor 0–5, T Hall 0–3, J Kenny 0–1, W Ryan 0–1.		P McNamara 2–2, D O'Malley 1–0, T Hickey 0–3, J Hayes 0–1, B Laffan 0–1.

8 July 1984 Second round replay	Cappamore	2–12 – 1–05	Feohanagh	FitzGerald Park
	M Sheehan 2–3, L O'Brien 0–8, L Creamer 0–1.		D Noonan 1–0, E Flanagan 0–3, T Quaid 0–2.

=== Quarter-finals ===
28 July 1984 Quarter-final	Mungret/St Paul's	2–12 – 1–09	Fedamore	Croom Grounds
	J Keating 2–1, D Keating 0–4, L O'Donoghue 0–4, G Fahy 0–2, N Sexton 0–1.		J Cregan 1–1, S Fitzgibbon 0–2, W O'Mahony 0–2, T McNamara 0–2, S Enright 0–1, N Noonan 0–1.

28 July 1984 Quarter-final	Bruff	1–11 – 2–06	Ballybrown	FitzGerald Park
	G Browne 0–5, W Bulfin 1–1, P Barrett 0–3, B Horan 0–1, P Reale 0–1.		T Kenny 1–3, E Cliffe 1–1, O O'Connor 0–1, W Ryan 0–1.

11 August 1984 Quarter-final	Patrickswell	0–14 – 1–09	Kilmallock	Bruff Grounds
	G Kirby 0–5, G Hayes 0–2, P Foley 0–2, F Nolan 0–2, D Punch 0–1, R Bennis 0–1, A Carmody 0–1.		P Kelly 0–5, B Guiney 1–1, J Neenan 0–2, D Barry 0–1.

12 August 1984 Quarter-final	Cappamore	3–06 – 2–09	Claughaun	FitzGerald Park
	D Mulcahy 1–1, L Creamer 1–0, M Lonergan 1–0, L O'Brien 0–3, N Sheahan 0–1, G Sheahan 0–1.		G Ryan 1–2, D Fitzgerald 1–0, M Ryan 0–2, M Molyneaux 0–2, T Marsh 0–1, W Conway 0–1, E Cregan 0–1.

19 August 1984 Quarter-final replay	Cappamore	4–06 – 2–11	Claughaun	FitzGerald Park
	L O'Brien 4–2, W Sheahan 0–2, P Creamer 0–1, D Mulcahy 0–1.		M Ryan 2–1, M Molyneaux 0–4, D Fitzgerald 0–2, T Marsh 0–1, D Whyte 0–1, P Galligan 0–1, E Cregan 0–1.

=== Semi-finals ===
18 August 1984 Semi-final	Patrickswell	1–15 – 1–04	Mungret/St Paul's	Gaelic Grounds
	G Kirby 0–5, G Hayes 1–1, R Bennis 0–3, F Nolan 0–2, A Carmody 0–1, D Punch 0–1, S Kirby 0–1, P Foley 0–1.		F McDonagh 1–0, D Keating 0–2, D Moroney 0–1, C Hehir 0–1.

30 September 1984 Semi-final	Cappmore	2–10 – 2–05	Bruff	Gaelic Grounds
	L Creamer 2–1, L O'Brien 0–5, D Mulcahy 0–2, P Creamer 0–1, N Sheehan 0–1.		P Reale 2–0, B Horan 0–1, G Hayes 0–1, M Reale 0–1, G O'Connell 0–1, W Bulfin 0–1.

=== Final ===
14 October 1984 Final	Patrickswell	4–13 – 3–05	Cappamore	Gaelic Grounds
	S Kirby 1–1, G Kirby 1–1, F Nolan 1–1, G Hayes 1–1, R Bennis 0–4, S Foley 0–3, A Carmody 0–2		L O'Brien 1–5, N Sheehan 1–0, E Mulcahy 1–0.	Referee: L Shanahan (Croom)
