= 1970 Limerick Senior Hurling Championship =

Annual hurling competition season

- Champions: Patrickswell (4th title); Tony O'Brien (captain)
- Runners-up: Kilmallock

The 1970 Limerick Senior Hurling Championship was the 76th staging of the Limerick Senior Hurling Championship since its establishment by the Limerick County Board.

Patrickswell were the defending champions.

On 4 October 1970, Patrickswell won the championship after a 2–14 to 0–02 defeat of Kilmallock in the final. It was their fourth championship title overall and their second title in succession.

== Results ==
=== Quarter-finals ===
26 July 1970 Quarter-final	Adare	3–07 – 2–08	Old Christians	Bruff Grounds
	J Brenann 2–1, W Chawke 1–1, T Howard 0–3, P Doherty 0–1, T Dunworth 0–1.		P Hennessy 1–1, B Hartigan 0–4, J Flanagan 1–0, M Hennessy 0–2, D Greaney 0–1.

9 August 1970 Quarter-final	Fedamore	7–05 – 5–06	Mungret	FitzGerald Park
	G Gleeson 3–4, A Clohessy 2–0, J Ryan 1–0, J Condon 1–0, M Kelleher 0–1.		L O'Donoghue 3–0, J O'Grady 1–0, P McCarthy 1–0, P Ryan 0–3, H O'Grady 0–2, M Kiely 0–1.

9 August 1970 Quarter-final	Patrickswell	3–19 – 3–02	Cappamore	FitzGerald Park
	R Bennis 1–7, P Bennis 0–8, J Shields 1–2, L Mann 1–0, L Foley 0–1, F Nolan 0–1.		J Hayes 1–1, P O'Malley 1–0, C McCarthy 1–0, O O'Malley 0–1.

=== Semi-finals ===
30 August 1970 Semi-final	Patrickswell	3–09 – 3–07	Adare	FitzGerald Park
	R Bennis 1–6, J Shields 2–0, P Bennis 0–2, P Carey 0–1.		T Howard 1–2, J Brennan 1–1, M O'Connell 1–1, W Chawke 0–1, G Shire 0–1, M Brennan 0–1

13 September 1970 Semi-final	Kilmallock	2–05 – 1–06	Fedamore	Bruff Grounds
	B Savage 1–1, M Heffernan 1–0, D McCarthy 0–1, N Hayes 0–1, M Dowling 0–1, J Horgan 0–1.		J Leoanrd 1–2, G Gleeson 0–1, R Burton 0–1, E Prendeville 0–1, J Condon 0–1.

=== Final ===
4 October 1970 Final	Patrickswell	2–14 – 0–02	Kilmallock	Gaelic Grounds, Limerick
	R Bennis 0–6, L Foley 1–1, J Shields 1–0, P Carey 0–3, S Casey 0–2, F Nolan 0–1, S Foley 0–1.		J Horgan 0–1, B Savage 0–1.	Referee: M Slattery (Clare)
