= 1983 Limerick Senior Hurling Championship =

Annual hurling competition season

- Dates: 15 May – 11 September 1983
- Teams: 26
- Champions: Patrickswell (8th title); Leonard Enright (captain)
- Runners-up: Ballybrown; Tony Hall (captain)

Tournament statistics
- Matches played: 26
- Goals scored: 88 (3.38 per match)
- Points scored: 481 (18.5 per match)

The 1983 Limerick Senior Hurling Championship was the 89th staging of the Limerick Senior Hurling Championship since its establishment by the Limerick County Board in 1887. The championship ran from 15 May to 11 September 1983.

Patrickswell entered the championship as the defending champions.

The final was played on 11 September 1983 at the Gaelic Grounds in Limerick, between Patrickswell and Ballybrown, in what was their ever first meeting in the final. Patrickswell won the match by 1–13 to 1–07 to claim their eighth championship title overall and a second title in succession.

== Format change ==
Since 1972, the Limerick Senior Hurling Championship comprised just eight teams. These were the eight finalists from the four divisional championships. This format was abandoned in 1983 in favour of an open draw championship comprising 26 teams.

== Results ==
=== First round ===
15 May 1983 First round	Newcastle West	3–07 – 3–11	Bruff	FitzGerald Park
	J McMahon 1–2, T Doody 1–1, J Hayne 1–0, J Danaher 0–3, L Cremins 0–1.		W Bulfin 1–4, B Irwin 1–1, T Raleigh 1–0, D Kiely 0–2, B Horan 0–2, M Hehir 0–1, M Reale 0–1.

15 May 1983 First round	Bruree	4–04 – 0–08	Ardpatrick	FitzGerald Park
	P O'Brien 2–1, J O'Brien 1–3, P Potter 1–0.		E McGrath 0–4, P McGrath 0–2, D O'Sullivan 0–1, E O'Keeffe 0–1.

15 May 1983 First round	South Liberties	1–11 – 0–06	Cappamore	Harty Park
	E Grimes 0–4, J McKenna 0–4, N Nash 1–0, G McManus 0–1, M Butler 0–1, A Shanahan 0–1.		L O'Brien 0–2, D Mulcahy 0–2, E Mulcahy 0–1, P Creamer 0–1.

15 May 1983 First round	Boher	2–06 – 3–11	Doon	Harty Park
	S Hickey 1–1, T Hickey 1–0, I Walsh 0–2, P O'Malley 0–1, W Hanley 0–1.		G McGrath 1–2, P McGrath 1–1, P Moloney 0–4, G Thompson 1–0, S Maher 0–2, J Quinlan 0–1, T McGrath 0–1.

22 May 1983 First round	Ballybrown	2–14 – 4–07	Feohanagh	Bruff Grounds
	O Coughlan 1–1, O O'Connor 0–4, P Lynch 1–0, E Cliffe 0–2, C Keyes 0–2, T Kenny 0–2, J Mann 0–2, W Ryan 0–1.		T Quaid 2–4, J Flanagan 1–0, M Mullane 1–0, M Sweeney 0–1, E Flanagan 0–1, B Butler 0–1.

22 May 1983 First round	Killeedy	0–08 – 0–06	Croom	Rathkeale Grounds
	P Fitzmaurice 0–3, W Fitzmaurice 0–2, K Kelly 0–1, M Fitzmaurice 0–1, L Shine 0–1.		D Murray 0–5, E Mackessy 0–1.

22 May 1983 First round	Patrickswell	1–14 – 1–07	Mungret	Gaelic Grounds
	R Bennis 0–8, F Nolan 1–2, P Foley 0–3, S Hayes 0–1.		H O'Grady 1–0, L O'Donoghue 0–3, D Keating 0–3, C Keating 0–1.

22 May 1983 First round	Monaleen	2–05 – 0–05	Old Christians	Gaelic Grounds
	F Berkery 1–3, G O'Dwyer 1–1, G Collins 0–1.		J Hegarty 0–1, T Sheehan 0–1, G Toomey 0–1, J Cantillon 0–1, W Ryan 0–1.

22 May 1983 First round	Granagh	0–14 – 0–05	St Patrick's	Bruff Grounds
	R Chawke 0–6, T Treacy 0–2, J Chawke 0–2, W Power 0–1 J Noonan 0–1, T Donovan 0–1, P Connors 0–1.		G Morgan 0–3, G McMahon 0–2.

22 May 1983 First round	Tournafulla	2–09 – 2–15	Claughaun	Rathkeale Grounds
	P Horgan 2–1, D O'Connor 0–6, M Hartnett 0–2.		E Cregan 2–1, M Molyneux 0–4, F Ryan 0–3, D Fitzgerald 0–3, A Moloney 0–2, D Gahan 0–1, V Browne 0–1.

=== Second round ===
19 June 1983 Second round	Bruff	2–11 – 1–12	Dromin/Athlacca	Bruff Grounds
	A Gubbins 1–3, W Bulfin 0–5, S Bulfin 1–0, R O'Leary 0–2, M Hehir 0–1.		J Neenan 0–8, B Guiney 1–2, J O'Callaghan 0–1, W Neenan 0–1.

19 June 1983 Second round	Granagh	3–04 – 5–21	Doon	Bruff Grounds
	R Chawke 2–1, J Chawke 1–0, J Kelly 0–1, W Power 0–1.		P Ryan 4–3, G McGrath 0–10, J Quinlan 1–2, E Maher 0–2, P Moloney 0–2, S Maher 0–1, T McGrath 0–1.

26 June 1983 Second round	Bruree	4–11 – 4–07	Ballingarry	FitzGerald Park
				Referee: P Byrnes (South Liberties)

9 July 1983 Second round	Patrickswell	3–18 – 0–02	Fedamore	FitzGerald Park

10 July 1983 Second round	Claughaun	3–18 – 3–04	Monaleen	Gaelic Grounds
	M Molyneaux 0–7, D Fitzgerald 1–3, D Graham 1–3, W Conway 1–2, F Ryan 0–2, E Cregan 0–1.		F Berkery 1–1, P Moloney 1–0, P Enright 1–0, K Maher 0–1, E Leonard 0–1.

15 July 1983 Second round	Kilmallock	2–11 – 3–04	Killeedy	Croom Grounds
	P Kelly 1–6, D Barry 1–0, M Nelligan 0–2, G O'Brien 0–1, T Moloney 0–1, D O'Riordan 0–1.		J Cunningham 2–0, D O'Connor 1–0, L Shine 0–2, J O'Connor 0–2.

17 July 1983 Second round	Adare	1–05 – 1–07	Ahane	Gaelic Grounds
	M Alfred 1–0, B Flynn 0–2, M Benson 0–2, S Fitzgibbon 0–1.		S Óg Herbert 0–4, T Bradley 1–0, E Meskell 0–1, B Berkery 0–1, F kelly 0–1.

17 July 1983 Second round	South Liberties	2–08 – 0–16	Ballybrown	Bruff Grounds
	M Fitzgerald 1–2, J McKenna 1–1, E Grimes 0–3, M Grimes 0–1, A Shanahan 0–1.		T Kenny 0–6, O Coughlan 0–6, O O'Connor 0–2, C Keyes 0–1, P Lynch 0–1.

=== Quarter-finals ===
23 July 1983 Quarter-final	Patrickswell	2–10 – 0–07	Kilmallock	Bruff Grounds
	G Hayes 1–1, L Foley 1–0, D Russell 0–2, R Bennis 0–2, J Fenton 0–2, F Nolan 0–1, S Kirby 0–1, T O'Brien 0–1.		T Moloney 0–3, P Kelly 0–1, G O'Brien 0–1, O Cussen 0–1, D O'Riordan 0–1.

24 July 1983 Quarter-final	Doon	2–06 – 1–09	Ahane	Gaelic Grounds
	P Ryan 2–1, G McGrath 0–2, P Moloney 0–2, M Thompson 0–1.		B Berkery 1–1, S Óg Herbert 0–2, E Meskell 0–2, T Murnane 0–2, MJ Aherne 0–1, F Kelly 0–1.

24 July 1983 Quarter-final	Ballybrown	2–15 – 2–06	Bruff	FitzGerald Park
	T Kenny 0–9, C Keyes 1–2, P Lynch 1–0, E Cliffe 0–1, JJ Mann 0–1, M Mulqueen 0–1, O'Connor 0–1.		W Bulfin 1–3, G Browne 1–0, A Gubbins 0–2, J Bulfin 0–1.

24 July 1983 Quarter-final	Bruree	0–08 – 0–10	Claughaun	FitzGerald Park
	G Mullane 0–2, P Porter 0–1, J Porter 0–1, P O'Brien 0–1, L Lyons 0–1, G Randles 0–1, M Mulllane 0–1.		Conway 0–3, E Cregan 0–2, D Fitzgerald 0–2, M Molyneaux 0–2, A Moloney 0–1.

31 July 1983 Quarter-final replay	Doon	2–16 – 2–10	Ahane	Gaelic Grounds
	P Ryan 1–2, J Quinlan 1–2, P Moloney 0–5, T McGrath 0–5, P McGrath 0–2.		S Óg Herbert 1–2, MJ Aherne 1–1, T Murnane 0–3, S Ryan 0–2, E Meskell 0–1, F Kelly 0–1.

=== Semi-finals ===
20 August 1983 Semi-final	Patrickswell	2–05 – 1–04	Claughaun	Gaelic Grounds
	S Kirby 1–2, L Foley 1–0, F Nolan 0–1, G Hayes 0–1, J Fenton 0–1.		D Whyte 1–0, E Cregan 0–3, W Conway 0–1.

21 August 1983 Semi-final	Ballybrown	1–15 – 2–08	Doon	Bruff Grounds
	T Kenny 0–9, C Keyes 0–4, J Kenny 1–0, M Mulqueen 0–1, P Lynch 0–1.		P Moloney 0–4, P Ryan 1–0, T McGrath 1–0, E Maher 0–2, G Thompson 0–2, J Quinlan 0–1.

=== Final ===
11 September 1983 Final	Patrickswell	1–13 – 1–07	Ballybrown	Gaelic Grounds, Limerick
	S Kirby 1–2, R Bennis 0–4, L Foley 0–3, G Hayes 0–2, T Murray and F Nolan 0–1 each.		T Kenny 0–4, O O’Connor 1–0, C Keyes 0–2, E Cliffe 0–1.	Referee: K Walshe (Garryspillane)
