= 1990 Limerick Senior Hurling Championship =

Annual hurling competition season

- Dates: 22 July – 21 October 1990
- Teams: 16
- Champions: Patrickswell (12th title); David Punch (captain); Phil Bennis (manager)
- Runners-up: Adare; Shane Fitzgibbon (captain); Vincent Foley (manager)

Tournament statistics
- Matches played: 18
- Goals scored: 55 (3.06 per match)
- Points scored: 349 (19.39 per match)
- Top scorer(s): Gary Kirby (1–31)

The 1990 Limerick Senior Hurling Championship was the 96th staging of the Limerick Senior Hurling Championship since its establishment by the Limerick County Board in 1887. The draw for the first-round fixtures took place on 6 February 1990. The championship ran from 22 July to 21 October 1990.

Ballybrown were the defending champions, however, they were defeated by Patrickswell in first round.

On 21 October 1990, Patrickswell won the championship after a 1–15 to 1–12 defeat of Adare in the final. It was their 12th championship title overall and their first title in two championship seasons.

Patrickswell's Gary Kirby was the championship's top scorer with 1–31.

== Results ==
=== First round ===
22 July 1990 First round	Claughaun	0–13 – 3–07	Feohanagh	FitzGerald Park
	L O'Connor 0–4, M Rea 0–3, M Ryan 0–2, T Synnott 0–2, J Rea 0–1, F Fitzgerald 0–1.		T Quaid 0–4, P Quaid 1–0, J Quaid 1–0, G McAuliffe 1–0, C Phillips 0–2, S O'Keeffe 0–1.

22 July 1990 First round	Mungret/St Paul's	3–05 – 1–14	Adare	Bruff Sportsfield
	G O'Brien 1–3, D Keating 1–1, M Maguire 1–0, S McCarthy 0–1.		S Fitzgibbon 0–9, D Keane 1–2, D Marron 0–2, B Kennedy 0–1.

28 July 1990 First round	South Liberties	1–09 – 1–09	Bruree	Bruff Sportsfield
	P Donnelly 0–7, W Shanahan 0–1, M Nash 0–1, B Finn 0–1.		E Potter 0–4, G Mullane 1–0, M Sexton 0–2, M Mullane 0–1, D Deady 0–1, P Potter 0–1.

29 July 1990 First round	Patrickswell	2–14 – 0–08	Ballybrown	Gaelic Grounds
	G Kirby 0–7, N Carey 1–2, A Carmody 0–4, G Hayes 1–0, L Enright 0–1.		P Davoren 0–6, T Hall 0–1, J Mann 0–1.

29 July 1990 First round	Bruff	1–07 – 0–04	Doon	Gaelic Grounds
	P Reale 1–0, R O'Leary 0–3, J Mulqueen 0–3, A Madden 0–1.		G McGrath 0–2, R Walsh 0–1, M Ryan 0–1.

29 July 1990 First round	Kilmallock	3–10 – 3–07	Ahane	Fr Hayes Memorial Park
	M Houlihan 1–3, G O'Brien 0–4, P Tobin 1–0, J Neenan 1–0, L Tobin 0–2, P Kelly 0–1.		G Mulcahy 2–4, J O'Grady 1–0, T Murnane 0–2, M Flannery 0–1.

29 July 1990 First round	Killeedy	1–09 – 1–06	Newcastle West	Ballingarry Grounds
	D Flynn 1–2, K Kelly 0–2, J Fitzgibbon 0–2, J Magner 0–1, P Fitzmaurice 0–1, T Magner 0–1.		D Cremin 0–5, J McMahon 1–0, E Walsh 0–1.

29 July 1990 First round	Blackrock	3–06 – 2–15	Cappamore	Bruff Sportsfield
			L O'Brien 0–10.

10 August 1990 First round replay	South Liberties	3–10 – 2–06	Bruree	Bruff Sportsfield
	L Dooley 2–3, N Nash 1–1, P Donnelly 0–3, W Shanahan 0–2, B Finn 0–1.		M Mullane 1–1, D Deady 1–1, E Potter 0–3, M Moloney 0–1.

=== Quarter-finals ===
19 August 1990 Quarter-final	Kilmallock	5–12 – 1–08	Bruff	Michael Fox Park
	M Houlihan 1–6, M Nelligan 1–2, L Tobin 1–1, P Tobin 1–2, D Barry 1–0, T Nelligan 0–1.		R O'Leary 1–3, T Madden 0–2, P Barrett 0–1, J Fitzgerald 0–1, S Mulqueen 0–1.

19 August 1990 Quarter-final	Adare	3–07 – 2–10	South Liberties	Bruff Sportsfield
	V Buckley 1–1, D Keane 1–1, G Kinnivane 1–0, S Fitzgibbon 0–2, M Alfred 0–2, A Howard 0–1.		L Dooley 1–5, N Nash 1–1, M Grimes 0–1, M Nash 0–1, W Shanahan 0–1, M Fitzgerald 0–1.

26 August 1990 Quarter-final	Patrickswell	1–15 – 0–06	Feohanagh	FitzGerald Park
	C Carey 1–4, S Kirby 0–5, G Kirby 0–3, L Enright 0–1, A Carmody 0–1, R Fitzgerald 0–1.		T Quaid 0–4, John Quaid 0–1, P Quaid 0–1.

26 August 1990 Quarter-final	Capppamore	2–13 – 1–16	Killeedy	FitzGerald Park
	L O'Brien 0–7, J McCarthy 1–1, M Gleeson 1–0, D Mulcahy 0–2, R Hammersley 0–2, M Lonergan 0–1.		K Kelly 1–5, W Fitzmaurice 0–4, J Magner 0–2, P Fleming 0–1, T Magner 0–1, J Fitzgibbon 0–1, D Flynn 0–1, D O'Connor 0–1.

9 September 1990 Quarter-final replay	Adare	2–10 – 1–05	South Liberties	FitzGerald Park
	A Howard 1–2, V Buckley 1–0, S Fitzgibbon 0–3, B Kennedy 0–1, G Kinnavan 0–1, D Marron 0–1.		L Dooley 0–4, M Nash 1–0, D Donnelly 0–1.

9 September 1990 Quarter-final replay	Capppamore	0–11 – 2–07	Killeedy	FitzGerald Park
	A Murphy 0–3, G Sheehan 0–2, D Mulcahy 0–2, L O'Brien 0–1, R Hammersley 0–1, M O'Connor 0–1, N Sheehan 0–1.		D O'Connor 1–1, P Fleming 1–1, J Fitzgibbon 0–2, J Magner 0–1, K Kelly 0–1, J O'Connor 0–1.

=== Semi-finals ===
23 September 1990 Semi-final	Adare	0–14 – 0–09	Kilmallock	Bruff Sportsfield
	S Fitzgibbon 0–3, D Keane 0–3, B Kennedy 0–3, A Howard 0–2, M Alfred 0–1, G Kinnavane 0–1, T Dunne 0–1.		M Houlihan 0–7, D Clarke 0–1, M Nelligan 0–1.

30 September 1990 Semi-final	Patrickswell	2–15 – 1–05	Killeedy	FitzGerald Park
	G Kirby 1–12, G Hynes 1–0, C Carey 0–2, L Enright 0–1.		K Kelly 1–2, J Fitzgibbon 0–2, D O'Connor 0–1.

=== Final ===
21 October 1990 Final	Patrickswell	1–15 – 1–12	Adare	Gaelic Grounds
	G Kirby 0–9, L Enright 1–0, C Carey 0–2, S Kirby 0–2, P Foley 0–1, N Carey 0–1.		S Fitzgibbon 0–7, G Kennedy 1–0, W Hickey 0–3, V Buckley 0–1, G Hickey 0–1.

== Championship statistics ==
=== Top scorers ===
Overall

Rank	Player	Club	Tally	Total	Matches	Average
1	Gary Kirby	Patrickswell	1–31	34	4	8.50
2	Shane Fitzgibbon	Adare	0–24	24	5	4.80
3	Mike Houlihan	Kilmallock	2–16	22	3	7.33
4	Liam Dooley	South Liberties	3–12	21	3	7.00
5	Liam O'Brien	Cappamore	0–18	18	3	6.00
6	Kevin Kelly	Killeedy	2–10	16	4	4.00
7	Dave Keane	Adare	2–06	12	4	3.00
8	Ciarán Carey	Patrickswell	1–08	11	4	2.75
9	Ger Mulcahy	Ahane	2–04	10	1	10.00
9	Pat Donnelly	South Liberties	0–10	10	3	3.33

Single game

Rank	Player	Club	Tally	Total	Opposition
1	Gary Kirby	Patrickswell	1–12	15	Killeedy
2	Ger Mulcahy	Ahane	2–04	10	Kilmallock
2	Liam O'Brien	Cappamore	0–10	10	Blackrock
4	Liam Dooley	South Liberties	2–03	9	Bruree
4	Mike Houlihan	Kilmallock	1–06	9	Bruff
4	Gary Kirby	Patrickswell	0–09	9	Adare
4	Shane Fitzgibbon	Adare	0–09	9	Mungret/St Paul's
8	Kevin Kelly	Killeedy	1–05	8	Cappamore
8	Liam Dooley	South Liberties	1–05	8	Adare
10	Ciarán Carey	Patrickswell	1–04	7	Feohanagh
10	Mike Houlihan	Kilmallock	0–07	7	Adare
10	Liam O'Brien	Cappamore	0–07	7	Killeedy
10	Shane Fitzgibbon	Adare	0–07	7	Patrickswell
10	Pat Donnelly	South Liberties	0–07	7	Bruree
10	Gary Kirby	Patrickswell	0–07	7	Ballybrown
