= 1965 Limerick Senior Hurling Championship =

Annual hurling competition season

- Teams: 22
- Champions: Patrickswell (1st title); Phil Bennis (captain)
- Runners-up: St Ciarán's

The 1965 Limerick Senior Hurling Championship was the 71st staging of the Limerick Senior Hurling Championship since its establishment by the Limerick County Board in 1887.

Cappamore were the defending champions.

The final was played on 24 October 1965 at the Gaelic Grounds in Limerick, between Patrickswell and St Ciarán's, in what remains their only meeting in the final. Patrickswell won the match by 2–16 to 0–04 to claim their first ever championship title.

== Results ==
=== Quarter-finals ===
22 August 1965 Quarter-final	Patrickswell	3–09 – 3–01	Na Fianna	Gaelic Grounds

19 September 1965 Quarter-final	St Ciarán's	4–08 – 4–02	St John's	Gaelic Grounds

19 September 1965 Quarter-final	Kilmallock	5–07 – 2–02	Feenagh–Kilmeedy	Gaelic Grounds

19 September 1965 Quarter-final	Feohanagh	7–07 – 3–04	St Patrick's	FitzGerald Park

=== Semi-finals ===
10 October 1965 Semi-final	Patrickswell	5–06 – 1–05	Kilmallock	Gaelic Grounds

17 October 1965 Semi-final	St Ciarán's	4–09 – 1–09	Feohanagh	Newcastle West Grounds

=== Final ===
24 October 1965 Final	Patrickswell	2–16 – 0–04	St Ciarán's	Gaelic Grounds
	J Shields 1–5, E Carey 0–5, J O'Donnell 1–0, P Carey 0–2, P Bennis 0–1, N Leonard 0–1,		S Moloney 0–2, S McCarthy 0–1, J Begley 0–1.	Referee: T Sullivan
