= 1964 Limerick Senior Hurling Championship =

Annual hurling competition season

- Champions: Cappamore (5th title)
- Runners-up: Dromcollogher

The 1964 Limerick Senior Hurling Championship was the 70th staging of the Limerick Senior Hurling Championship since its establishment by the Limerick County Board in 1887.

Feenagh-Kilmeedy were the defending champions.

Cappamore won the championship after a 5–05 to 1–04 defeat of Dromcollogher in the final. It was their fifth championship title overall and their first title in five years. It remains their last championship triumph.
