= Tom Ryan (Limerick hurler) =

Irish hurler and manager

Personal information
- Native name: Tomás Ó Riain (Irish)
- Nickname: Timber Tom
- Born: 1944 (age 81–82) Ballybrown, County Limerick, Ireland
- Occupation: Electrical rewind mechanic
- Height: 5 ft 10 in (178 cm)

Sport
- Sport: Hurling
- Position: Left wing-back
Club
- Years: Club
- 1962–1983: Ballybrown
Club titles
- Limerick titles: 0
Inter-county
| Years | County | Apps (scores) |
| 1973–1976 | Limerick | 11 (0-00) |
Inter-county titles
- Munster titles: 2
- All-Irelands: 1
- NHL: 0
- All Stars: 0

Tom Ryan (born 1944 in Ballybrown, County Limerick, Ireland) is an Irish former hurling manager and player. He played hurling with his local club Ballybrown and was a member of the Limerick senior inter-county team from 1973 until 1976. Ryan later served as manager of both the Limerick and Westmeath senior inter-county teams.

== Playing career ==
=== Club ===
Ryan played his club hurling with his local club in Ballybrown.

=== Inter-county ===
Ryan began his playing career with Limerick in the 1960s and went on as a substitute for Bernie Hartigan in the 1973 All Ireland Final which Limerick won, beating Kilkenny by 1–21 to 1–14. He started the 1974 All Ireland final as a right half back but Limerick were beaten by Kilkenny 3–19 to 1–13. He also won a National Hurling League as a player in 1971.

== Managerial career ==
=== Limerick ===
Ryan took over as Limerick senior hurling manager from Phil Bennis in the late summer of 1993 and remained as manager until 1997. He won two Munster titles in 1994 and 1996 as a manager, and won a National Hurling League in 1997. He was removed immediately after that success following a frosty relationship with the Limerick county board officers. He was replaced as manager by Éamonn Cregan.

=== Westmeath ===
Ryan was appointed manager of the Westmeath senior hurling team in November 2003. After two unsuccessful years in this position, he stepped down in 2005.

Sporting positions
| Preceded by Phil Bennis | Limerick Senior Hurling Manager; 1993–1997 | Succeeded by Éamonn Cregan |
| Preceded by Michael Conneely | Westmeath Senior Hurling Manager; 2003–2005 | Succeeded by Séamus Qualter |
