= 1970–71 National Hurling League =

40th season of the National Hurling League

League details
- Dates: 8 November 1970 – 23 May 1971

League champions
- Winners: Limerick (7th win)

Other division winners
- Division 2: Wicklow

The 1970–71 National Hurling League was the 40th season of the National Hurling League.

== Division 1 ==
National Hurling League Division 1
- Season: 1970-71
- Champions: Limerick; 7th National League title Captain: Tony O'Brien
- Matches played: 55
- Top goalscorer: Eddie Keher (2-50)
- Biggest home win: Laois 4-17 - 0-7 Kerry (7 March 1971)
- Biggest away win: Kerry 1-2 - 4-17 Waterford (6 December 1970)
- Highest scoring: Kildare 5-7 - 7-9 Clare (8 November 1970)
- All statistics correct as of 22 February 2017.

Cork came into the season as defending champions of the 1969-70 season.

On 23 May 1971, Limerick won the title following a 3-12 to 3-11 win over Tipperary in the final. It was their first league title since the 1946-47 season and their 6th National League title overall.

Kilkenny's Eddie Keher was the Division 1 top scorer with 2-50.

=== Division 1A table ===
Pos	Team	Pld	W	D	L	Pts	Notes
1	Cork	7	5	1	1	11	
2	Tipperary	7	5	0	2	10	Division 1 runners-up
3	Limerick	7	5	0	2	10	Division 1 champions
4	Kilkenny	7	4	0	3	8	
5	Wexford	7	4	0	3	8	
6	Dublin	7	2	0	5	4	
7	Offaly	7	1	1	5	3	
8	Galway	7	1	0	6	2	Relegated to Division 1B

=== Group stage ===
8 November 1970	Tipperary	0-11 - 0-4	Kilkenny	Thurles Sportsfield, Thurles
	F Loughnane 0-5, T Egan 0-2, T O'Connor 0-1, M Jones 0-1, J Flanagan 0-1, P O'Neill 0-1.		E Keher 0-3, S Leahy 0-1.	Referee: S O'Connor (Limerick)

8 November 1970	Offaly	1-9 - 2-5	Dublin	St. Brendan's Park, Birr
	G Burke 1-1, J Flaherty 0-4, J Kirwan 0-2, PJ Whelehan 0-1, P Mulhaire 0-1.		M Bermingham 1-2, M Cooney 1-0, N Kinsella 0-1, T O'Connor 0-1, F Murphy 0-1.	Referee: M O'Brien (Tipperary)

8 November 1970	Limerick	4-9 - 3-4	Galway	Gaelic Grounds, Limerick
	E Cregan 3-0, A Dunworth 1-2, R Bennis 0-4, S Foley 0-1, M Graham 0-1, P Carey 0-1.		T Ryan 2-1, B O'Connor 1-1, P Mitchell 0-1, J Connolly 0-1.	Referee: J Dunphy (Waterford)

22 November 1970	Dublin	1-5 - 2-10	Tipperary	Croke Park, Dublin
	D Sheehan 1-0, M Bermingham 0-2, J Wallace 0-2, S Kinsella 0-1.		P Lowry 1-2, P O'Neill 1-0, F Loughnane 0-3, J Flanagan 0-2, T Egan 0-1, Mick Jones 0-1, PJ Ryan 0-1.	Referee: J Hatton (Wicklow)

22 November 1970	Galway	2-12 - 2-9	Offaly	Ballinasloe Sportsfield, Ballinasloe
	T Ryan 1-5, B O'Connor 1-1, P Mitchell 0-3, P Niland 0-1, F Kenny 0-1, P Fahy 0-1.		PJ Whelehan 0-4, P Mulhaire 1-0, M Cleere 1-0, G Burke 0-2, J Flaherty 0-1, A Barry 0-1, J Kirwan 0-1.	Referee: E O'Brien (Westmeath)

22 November 1970	Kilkenny	3-7 - 1-3	Limerick	Nowlan Park, Kilkenny
	J Millea 1-1, P Delaney 1-0, M Garrett 1-0, E Keher 0-3, P Lawlor 0-1, F Cummins 0-1, J Moriarty 0-1.		S Foley 1-0, M Graham 0-1, E Grimes 0-1, A Dunworth 0-1.	Referee: N Dalton (Waterford)

6 December 1970	Limerick	2-5 - 0-3	Dublin	Gaelic Grounds, Limerick
	W Moore 1-1, R Bennis 0-4, E Cregan 1-0.		M Bermingham 0-2, J Wallace 0-1.	Referee: M O'Brien (Tipperary)

6 December 1970	Tipperary	2-11 - 1-8	Galway	MacDonagh Park, Nenagh
	J Flanagan 1-3, J Doyle 1-1, L Gaynor 0-3, M Jones 0-1, PJ Ryan 0-1, F Loughnane 0-1, N O'Dwyer 0-1.		J Connolly 0-4, P Mitchaell 0-4, T Ryan 1-0.	Referee: S O'Connor (Limerick)

6 December 1970	Cork	1-14 - 2-10	Kilkenny	Cork Athletic Grounds, Cork
	S Barry 0-9, R Cummins 1-1, C Kelly 0-2, C Cullinane 0-1, J Murphy 0-1.		E Keher 1-6, P Delaney 1-3, M Brennan 0-1.	Referee: J Moloney (Tipperary)

6 December 1970	Offaly	2-5 - 3-5	Wexford	St. Brendan's Park, Birr
	P Mulhaire 1-1, J McKenna 1-0, J Kirwan 0-3, J Flaherty 0-1.		D Fortune 2-0, C Keogh 1-0, J Quigley 0-2, M Jacob 0-2, M Butler 0-1.	Referee: A Higgins (Galway)

7 February 1971	Dublin	3-12 - 3-6	Cork	Croke Park, Dublin
	M Bermingham 1-4, E Flynn 1-4, J Kenny 1-0, G O'Driscoll 0-2, F Murphy 0-1, S Moyles 0-1.		C Kelly 1-4, P Hegarty 1-1, C Cullinane 1-0, B Cummins 0-1.	Referee: J Hatton (Wicklow)

14 February 1971	Wexford	2-7 - 4-7	Tipperary	O'Kennedy Park, New Ross
	D Bernie 1-2, T Doran 1-0, M Jacob 0-3, C Jacob 0-1, J Quigley 0-1.		P Lowry 2-0, N O'Dwyer 1-1, P O'Neill 1-0, F Loughnane 0-2, J Flanagan 0-2, M Roche 0-1.	Referee: J Dunphy (Waterford)

21 February 1971	Cork	1-16 - 3-6	Wexford	Cork Athletic Grounds, Cork
	C Kelly 0-5, C McCarthy 0-4, C Roche 0-4, R Cummins 1-0, C Cullinane 0-2, M Malone 0-1.		J Quigley 1-1, D Fortune 1-1, J Berry 1-0, C Jacobs 0-2, N Buggy 0-2.	Referee: P Buggy (Kilkenny)

7 March 1971	Kilkenny	1-13 - 1-7	Offaly	Nowlan Park, Kilkenny
	E Keher 0-10, P Phelan 1-0, P Delaney 0-2, M Lawlor 0-1.		S Bergin 1-0, B Moylan 0-3, D Hanniffy 0-1, W O'Gorman 0-1, J Flaherty 0-1, PJ Whelehan 0-1.	Referee: G Fitzgerald (Limerick)

7 March 1971	Galway	2-6 - 2-8	Cork	Ballinasloe Sportsfield, Ballinasloe
	A Fenton 1-1, B O'Connor 1-0, P Fahy 0-3, J Connolly 0-1, F Kenny 0-1.		C McCarthy 1-5, P Ring 1-0, C Roche 0-2, R Cummins 0-1.	Referee: M Slattery (Clare)

7 March 1971	Wexford	2-7 - 1-17	Limerick	Enniscorthy
	N Buggy 1-4, T Doran 1-0, C Jacob 0-2, J Quigley 0-1.		R Bennis 0-9, D Flynn 1-2, E Grimes 0-2, F Nolan 0-1, S Foley 0-1, M Graham 0-1, B Hartigan 0-1.	Referee: J Dunphy (Waterford)

21 March 1971	Tipperary	0-17 - 4-7	Cork	Thurles Sportsfield, Thurles
	J Doyle 0-9, F Loughnane 0-4, M Keating 0-2, N O'Dwyer 0-1, J Flanagan 0-1.		C Kelly 1-4, R Cummins 2-0, M Malone 1-0, C Roche 0-2, D Clifford 0-1.	Referee: S O'Connor (Limerick)

21 March 1971	Wexford	2-12 - 2-9	Kilkeny	Wexford Park, Wexford
	T Doran 1-2, C Jacob 1-1, J Russell 0-3, C Dowdall 0-3, J Quigley 0-1, M Jacob 0-1, J Berry 0-1.		E Keher 0-5, P Delaney 1-1, M Lawlor 1-0, J Moriarty 0-1, M Brennan 0-1, J Millea 0-1.	Referee: P Dunphy (Waterford)

21 March 1971	Limerick	1-9 - 3-3	Offaly	Gaelic Grounds, Limerick
	J O'Donnell 1-0, E Grimes 0-3, W Moore 0-3, R Bennis 0-2, E Cregan 0-1.		JJ Healion 1-2, J Kirwan 1-0, P Mulhaire 1-0, T Dooley 0-1.	Referee: F Murphy (Cork)

21 March 1971	Dublin	3-13 - 3-5	Galway	Croke Park, Dublin
	M Bermingham 2-7, S Moyles 1-1, H Dalton 0-2, S Kinsella 0-1, D Sheehan 0-1, F Murphy 0-1.		P Fahy 2-1, A Kenny 1-0, B O'Connor 0-2, J Connolly 0-2.	Referee: J Hatton (Wicklow)

4 April 1971	Offaly	4-9 - 2-19	Tipperary	St. Brendan's Park, Birr
	J Kirwan 1-2, PJ Whelehan 1-1, J Flaherty 1-1, P Mulhaire 1-0, B Moylan 0-2, J McKenna 0-1, P Horan 0-1, JJ Helaion 0-1.		M Keating 0-7, M Roche 0-6, F Loughnane 1-1, J Carey 1-1, J Doyle 0-2, J Flanagan 0-1, Jack Ryan 0-1.

4 April 1971	Cork	4-7 - 2-13	Limerick	Cork Athletic Grounds, Cork
	R Cummins 3-0, W Walsh 1-0, C Kelly 0-2, C Roche 0-2, C McCarthy 0-1, G McCarthy 0-1, D Clifford 0-1.		R Bennis 0-9, B Hartigan 1-2, C Shanahan 1-0, E Grimes 0-2.	Referee: M Slattery (Clare)

4 April 1971	Galway	3-11 - 3-12	Wexford	Ballinasloe Sportsfield, Ballinasloe
	J Connolly 1-3, T Ryan 1-2, C Muldoon 1-0, B O'Connor 0-3, P Fahy 0-1, S Hogan 0-1, P Mitchell 0-1.		T Doran 2-2, C Dowdall 0-6, J Berry 1-1, J Russell 0-2, J Murphy 0-1.

4 April 1971	Kilkenny	1-15 - 1-5	Dublin	Nowlan Park, Kilkenny
	E Keher 0-10, N Byrne 1-0, M Brennan 0-2, W Murphy 0-1, J Moriarty 0-1, P Delaney 0-1.		B Cooney 1-0, M Bermingham 0-3, J Kenny 0-1, F Murphy 0-1.	Referee: N Dalton (Waterford)

18 April 1971	Kilkenny	2-12 - 1-8	Galway	Nowlan Park, Kilkenny
	E Keher 0-9, M Brennan 1-0, J Moriarty 1-0, F Cummins 0-2, M Lawlor 0-1.		P Fahy 1-0, J Connolly 0-5, T Ryan 0-2, D O'Connor 0-1.	Referee: N Dalton (Waterford)

18 April 1971	Limerick	0-13 - 1-8	Tipperary	Gaelic Grounds, Limerick
	R Bennis 0-6, E Cregan 0-3, S Foley 0-2, E Grimes 0-1, B Hartigan 0-1.		N O'Dywer 1-1, M Roche 0-3, J Flanagan 0-2, M Jones 0-1, J Doyle 0-1.	Referee: F Murphy (Cork)

18 April 1971	Cork	3-9 - 0-15	Offaly	Cork Athletic Grounds, Cork
	G McCarthy 1-3, M Malone 1-1, C Cullinane 1-0, C Roche 0-2, R Cummins 0-1, C Kelly 0-1.		B Moylan 0-6, J Flaherty 0-4, PJ Whelehan 0-2, D Hanniffy 0-1, P Mulhaire 0-1, J McKenna 0-1.	Referee: S Moloney (Tipperary)

18 April 1971	Wexford	5-9 - 2-5	Dublin	Wexford Park, Wexford
	J Berry 2-2, T Doran 1-3, C Dowdall 1-2, P Butler 1-0, D Bernie 0-1, J Russell 0-1.		M Bermingham 1-3, B Cooney 1-0, H Dalton 0-1, D Rheinish 0-1.

=== Division 1B table ===
Pos	Team	Pld	W	D	L	Pts	Notes
1	Clare	6	5	0	1	10	Promoted to Division 1A
2	Kildare	6	5	0	1	10	
3	Waterford	6	4	1	1	9	
4	Laois	6	3	0	3	6	
5	Kerry	5	1	0	4	2	
6	Westmeath	6	1	0	5	2	
7	Antrim	5	0	1	4	1	

=== Group stage ===
8 November 1970	Laois	1-3 - 2-5	Waterford	O'Moore Park, Portlaoise
	P Conroy 1-0, P Dillon 0-2, P Bates 0-1.		S Greene 2-1, W Kiely 0-2, P Walsh 0-1, P Enright 0-1.

8 November 1970	Kildare	5-7 - 7-9	Clare	St. Conleth's Park, Newbridge
	J Walsh 2-2, T Carew 1-2, B Burke 1-1, M Dwan 1-0, M Behan 0-2.		M Gilmartin 3-3, M Culligan 3-0, J McNamara 0-4, M Arthur 1-0, D Fitzgerald 0-1, J Rochford 0-1.	Referee: P Brennan (Laois)

8 November 1970	Kerry	5-5 - 1-10	Westmeath	Austin Stack Park, Tralee
	W Maguire 3-2, J McGrath 1-2, J O'Sullivan 1-0, T Nolan 0-1.		T Ring 0-4, S White 1-0, J Carey 0-2, L Jackson 0-1, C Connaughton 0-1, P Bradley 0-1, L Maher 0-1.	Referee: J Quaid (Limerick)

22 November 1970	Waterford	4-7 - 5-11	Kildare	Walsh Park, Waterford
	S Greene 3-1, J Flynn 1-1, P Enright 0-2, M Ormonde 0-2, B Kiely 0-1.		J Walsh 2-3, P Campbell 1-1, P Dunny 1-1, T Carew 1-0, R Burke 0-3, M Dwan 0-2, M Mullins 0-1.	Referee: P Johnston (Kilkenny)

22 November 1970	Clare	5-13 - 4-2	Kerry	Daly Park, Tulla
	J McNamara 1-5, E Fitzgerald 2-1, N Casey 1-4, J O'Donnell 1-1, J Cullinane 0-1, T Slattery 0-1.		T Nolan 1-1, F Thornton 1-0, P Costello 1-0, J Sullivan 1-0, J McGrath 0-1.	Referee: S O'Connor (Limerick)

22 November 1970	Westmeath	5-7 - 4-9	Antrim	Cusack Park, Mullingar
	J Davis 2-0, L Jackson 2-0, S Eighan 1-0, S White 0-2, L Maher 0-2, J Keary 0-1, P Bradley 0-1, C Gavin 0-1.		W Richmond 3-2, S Richmond 1-0, A McCallin 0-3, S Collins 0-2, A Connolly 0-1, B McGarry 0-1.	Referee: J Kirwan (Offaly)

6 December 1970	Kildare	3-11 - 3-4	Laois	Sallins Road, Naas
	J Walsh 1-5, T Carew 1-1, P Dunny 0-2, A Carew 0-1, B Burke 0-1, B Burke 0-1.		T Duggan 1-2, M Mahon 1-1, D Sheeran 1-0, P Dowling 0-1.

6 December 1970	Kerry	1-2 - 4-17	Waterford	Austin Stack Park, Tralee
	J McGrath 1-0, JM Brick 0-1, W Maguire 0-1.		P Enright 0-9, M Ormonde 2-2, A Heffernan 2-1, M Hickey 0-2, J Whelan 0-2, M Whelan 0-1.	Referee: S Quaid (Limerick)

6 December 1970	Antrim	2-5 - 3-11	Clare	Fr. Healy Park, Loughguile

7 March 1971	Waterford	3-14 - 5-8	Antrim	Walsh Park, Waterford
	S Greene 1-3, P Enright 0-6, M Ormonde 1-0, P McGrath 1-0, M Hickey 0-3, A Heffernan 0-2.		W Richmond 3-0, S Collins 0-5, J McCann 1-0, C McDonnell 1-0, E Donnelly 0-2, B McGarry 0-1.	Referee: J Murphy (Kilkenny)

7 March 1971	Clare	2-15 - 1-6	Westmeath	Newmarket-on-Fergus
	J McNamara 1-4, M Ken.. 1-1, S Durack 0-4, D Fitzgerald 0-3, J O'Donnell 0-3.		M Fagan 1-0, C Connaughton 0-3, M Flanagan 0-2, L Jackson 0-1.

7 March 1971	Laois	4-17 - 0-7	Kerry	O'Moore Park, Portlaoise
	G Lanham 1-2, P Dowling 1-2, M Carroll 1-1, G Conroy 1-1, P Bates 0-4, F Keenan 0-4, P Dillon 0-3.		T Nolan 0-3, J Flanagan 0-3, P Moriarty 0-1.

21 March 1971	Westmeath	2-6 - 6-6	Waterford	Cusack Park, Mullingar
	L Jackson 1-2, M Flanagan 1-2, C Gavin 0-1, C Connaughton 0-1.		J Flynn 2-3, P Cody 1-1, P Walsh 1-0, M Ormonde 1-0, S Greene 1-0, J Kirwan 0-2.	Referee: C Foley (Dublin)

21 March 1971	Kerry	3-4 - 5-12	Kildare	Austin Stack Park, Tralee
	J O'Sullivan 2-0, T Nolan 1-3, J McGrath 0-1.		J Walsh 1-5, T Carew 2-1, B Burke 1-1, M Behan 1-1, J O'Connell 0-2, P Dunny 0-1, M Doran 0-1.

21 March 1971	Antrim	3-7 - 4-13	Laois	Waterfoot
	A McCallin 1-4, W Richmond 1-1, S Richmond 1-0, JP McFadden 0-1, B McGarry 0-1.		P Bates 1-7, G Lanham 2-1, F Keenan 1-1, E Moore 0-2, D Sheeran 0-1, P Dillon 0-1.

28 March 1971	Kildare	4-14 - 3-8	Antrim	Geraldine Park, Athy

4 April 1971	Waterford	4-11 - 4-10	Clare	Fraher Field, Dungarvan
	P Enright 0-9, D Ormonde 2-0, P Coady 1-0, J Greene 1-0, J Kirwan 0-1, W Kiley 0-1.		D Fitzgerald 1-3, N Casey 1-1, J O'Donnell 1-0, M Kilmartin 1-0, T Ryan 0-3, P Russell 0-3.	Referee: F Murphy (Cork)

18 April 1971	Westmeath	2-6 - 4-12	Kildare	Cusack Park, Mullingar
	J Keary 1-1, O Egan 1-0, M Flanagan 0-2, P Bradley 0-1, L Maher 0-1.		B Burke 1-4, M Dwane 1-3, T Carew 1-0, N Baine 1-0, T walsh 0-3, T Christian 0-1, P Campbell 0-1.

18 April 1971	Clare	4-14 - 5-3	Laois	Cusack Park, Ennis
	A McNamara 1-3, T Ryan 1-0, T Slattery 1-0, J O'Donnell 1-0, N Casey 0-3, P Russell 0-3, J Rochford 0-3, M Moroney 0-1, J McMahon 0-1.		P Bates 2-2, L Conroy 2-0, F Keenan 1-0, D Sheeran 0-1.

=== Play-offs ===
25 April 1971 Play-off	Limerick	2-15 - 1-15	Tipperary	Croke Park, Dublin
	R Bennis 0-7, W Moore 1-1, S Foley 1-0, E Cregan 0-3, E Grimes 0-2, B Hartigan 0-1, C Shanahan 0-1.		J Doyle 0-9, M Nolan 1-0, M Roche 0-3, M Jones 0-1, J Flanagan 0-1, J Ryan 0-1.	Referee: S Kirwan (Offaly)

2 May 1971 Play-off	Wexford	5-8 - 3-13	Kilkenny	Walsh Park, Waterford
	P Wilson (2-1), C Jacob (2-0), J Berry (1-2), C Dowdall (0-2), T Doran (0-2), C Doran (0-1).		E Keher (1-4), P Delaney (1-2), N Byrne (1-1), J Moriarty (0-3), K Purcell (0-3).	Referee: J Dunphy (Waterford)

22 August 1971 Play-off	Clare	4-9 - 3-9	Kildare	Cusack Park, Ennis
	V Loftus 2-2, S Durack 1-2, M Kilmartin 1-1, P Russell 0-2, M Pewter 0-1, T Ryan 0-1.		J Walsh 0-6, R Burke 1-2, M Dwane 1-1, T Burke 1-0.

=== Knock-out stage ===
Quarter-finals

2 May 1971 Quarter-final	Tipperary	5-16 - 3-10	Kildare	O'Moore Park, Portlaoise
	J Doyle (2-9), J Flanagan (2-2), P Byrne (1-2), M Roche (0-3).		J Walsh (3-5), Tommy Carew (0-2), B Burke (0-2), N Behan (0-1).	Referee: J Rankins (Laois)

9 May 1971 Quarter-final	Clare	4-10 - 1-7	Wexford	Semple Stadium, Thurles
	M Gilmartin (2-0), T Ryan (1-2), J McNamara (0-5), J McMahon (1-1), L Gallagher (0-1), P Russell (0-1).		C Dowdall (1-2), T Doran (0-2), C Doran (0-2), C Jacob (0-1).	Referee: M Spain (Offaly)

Semi-finals

9 May 1971 Semi-final	Tipperary	2-12 - 2-10	Cork	Gaelic Grounds, Limerick
	M Keating (1-9), P Byrne (1-1), N O'Dwyer (0-1), J Ryan (0-1).		C Kelly (1-4), R Cummins (1-0), C McCarthy (0-3), T Ryan (0-2), W Walsh (0-1).	Attendance: 11,000; Referee: N Dalton (Waterford)

16 May 1971 Semi-final	Limerick	1-11 - 2-6	Clare	Semple Stadium, Thurles
	É Grimes (1-2), R Bennis (0-5), D Flynn (0-2), É Cregan (0-1).		J McMahon (1-1), P Russell (1-0), T Ryan (0-2), T Slattery (0-1), M Moroney (0-1), J O'Gorman (0-1).

Final

23 May 1971 Final	Limerick	3-12 - 3-11	Tipperary	Cork Athletic Grounds, Cork
	R Bennis (0-8), É Cregan (2-1), M Graham (1-0), É Grimes (0-1), M Cregan (0-1), B Hartigan (0-1).		J Ryan (2-3), M Keating (0-6), P Byrne (1-0), M Roche (0-1), J Flanagan (0-1).	Attendance: 19,030

=== Scoring statistics ===
Top scorers overall

Rank	Player	Team	Tally	Total	Matches	Average
1	Eddie Keher	Kilkenny	2-50	56	8	7.00
2	Richie Bennis	Limerick	0-54	54	9	6.00

Top scorers in a single game

Rank	Player	Team	Tally	Total	Opposition
1	Jimmy Doyle	Tipperary	2-09	15	Kildare
2	Johnny Walsh	Kildare	2-09	15	Tipperary
3	Mick Bermingham	Dublin	2-07	13	Galway
4	Mick Gilmartin	Clare	3-03	12	Kildare
4	Michael Keating	Tipperary	1-09	12	Cork
6	Willie Maguire	Kerry	3-02	11	Westmeath
6	Willie Richmond	Antrim	3-02	11	Westmeath
8	Stephen Greene	Waterford	3-01	10	Kildare
8	Eddie Keher	Kilkenny	0-10	10	Dublin
8	Paddy Bates	Laois	1-07	10	Antrim
8	Eddie Keher	Kilkenny	0-10	10	Offaly

== Division 2 ==
=== Division 2 table ===
Pos	Team	Pld	W	D	L	Pts	Notes
1	Wicklow	4	4	0	0	8	Division 2 champions
2	Meath	4	3	0	1	6	Division 2 runners-up
3	Down	4	2	0	2	4	
4	Carlow	4	1	0	3	2	
5	Louth	4	0	0	4	0	
