= 1982 Limerick Senior Hurling Championship =

Annual hurling competition season

- Dates: 8 August – 12 September 1982
- Teams: 8
- Champions: Patrickswell (7th title); Pat Foley (captain)
- Runners-up: Bruree; Donal Mullane (captain)

Tournament statistics
- Matches played: 7
- Goals scored: 25 (3.57 per match)
- Points scored: 139 (19.86 per match)

The 1982 Limerick Senior Hurling Championship was the 88th staging of the Limerick Senior Hurling Championship since its establishment by the Limerick County Board in 1887. The championship ran from 8 August to 12 September 1982.

South Liberties were the defending champions, however, they failed to qualify after being beaten by Boher in the East Limerick SHC.

On 12 September 1982, Patrickswell won the championship after a 0–17 to 0–15 defeat of Bruree in the final. It was their seventh championship title overall and their first title in three championship seasons.

== Teams ==
Championship	Champions	Runners-up
Limerick City Senior Hurling Championship	Patrickswell	Mungret
East Limerick Senior Hurling Championship	Boher	Doon
South Limerick Senior Hurling Championship	Croom	Bruree
West Limerick Senior Hurling Championship	Adare	Tournafulla

== Results ==
=== Quarter-finals ===
8 August 1982 Quarter-final	Patrickswell	2–19 – 2–06	Doon	FitzGerald Park

15 August 1982 Quarter-final	Mungret	2–08 – 1–08	Boher	Bruff Grounds
	D Keating 0–4, J Browne 1–0, J Fitzgerald 1–0, E Barry 0–3, H O'Grady 0–1.		T Hickey 1–1, J Brouder 0–3, B Laffan 0–1, P Laffan 0–1, S Hickey 0–1, P O'Malley 0–1.

15 August 1982 Quarter-final	Bruree	3–10 – 3–03	Adare	Gaelic Grounds
	M Mullane 1–1, G Randles 1–1, M Moloney 1–0, D Mullane 0–2, P O'Brien 0–2, G Mullane 0–2, J Potter 0–1, P Potter 0–1.		S Fitzgibbon 2–0, B Flynn 1–1, M Alfred 0–2.

15 August 1982 Quarter-final	Croom	3–09 – 2–08	Tournafulla	Páirc na nGael

=== Semi-final ===
22 August 1982 Semi-final	Patrickswell	2–15 – 2–04	Croom	FitzGerald Park
	J Enright 1–1, R Bennis 0–4, N Wall 1–0, F Nolan 0–3, G Hayes 0–3, S Foley 0–2, T Murray 0–1, J Boland 0–1.		A Lalor 1–0, J Kennedy 1–0, G Murray 0–1, D Murray 0–1, M O'Shea 0–1, G Howard 0–1.

29 August 1982 Semi-final	Bruree	3–08 – 0–09	Mungret	Rathkeale Grounds
	G Mullane 1–3, M Mullane 1–0, M Moloney 1–0, P O'Brien 0–2, J Potter 0–2, P Potter 0–1.		C Keating 0–4, E Barry 0–3, D Keating 0–1, L O'Donoghue 0–1.

=== Final ===
12 September 1982 Final	Patrickswell	0–17 – 0–15	Bruree	Gaelic Grounds
	R Bennis 0–5, F Nolan 0–4, T Murray 0–3, G Hayes 0–3, N Well 0–1, S Foley 0–1.		P O'Brien 0–4, G Mullane 0–4, P Potter 0–3, J Potter 0–2, D Mullane 0–2.

== Championship statistics ==
=== Miscellaneous ===
- Croom qualified for the semi-finals for the first time in 41 years.
