= 1979 Limerick Senior Hurling Championship =

Annual hurling competition season

- Dates: 12 August – 23 September 1979
- Teams: 8
- Champions: Patrickswell (6th title); Richie Bennis (captain)
- Runners-up: Tournafulla

Tournament statistics
- Matches played: 7
- Goals scored: 25 (3.57 per match)
- Points scored: 138 (19.71 per match)
- Top scorer(s): Richie Bennis (0–19)

The 1979 Limerick Senior Hurling Championship was the 85th staging of the Limerick Senior Hurling Championship since its establishment by the Limerick County Board.

South Liberties were the defending champions.

On 23 September 1979, Patrickswell won the championship after a 2–16 to 1–06 defeat of Tournafulla in the final. It was their sixth championship title overall and their first title in two championship seasons.

== Teams ==
Championship	Champions	Runners-up
Limerick City Senior Hurling Championship	Patrickswell	Monaleen
East Limerick Senior Hurling Championship	South Liberties	Doon
South Limerick Senior Hurling Championship	Kilmallock	Garryspillane
West Limerick Senior Hurling Championship	Tournafulla	Killeedy

== Results ==
=== Quarter-finals ===
12 August 1979 Quarter-final	Killeedy	3–09 – 2–15	Kilmallock	Bruff Grounds
	P Fitzmaurice 0–5, W Fitzmaurice 1–1, D Flynn 1–0, G Forde 1–0, T Mulcahy 0–3.		J Neenan 1–6, P Kelly 0–5, J Riordan 1–0, T Moloney 0–3, B Savage 0–1.

12 August 1979 Quarter-final	Tournafulla	2–04 – 0–06	Garryspillane	Dromcollogher Grounds

19 August 1979 Quarter-final	South Liberties	2–13 – 1–06	Monaleen	Bruff Grounds
	M Butler 1–1, J McKenna 0–4, T Twomey 1–0, E Grimes 0–3, T Ryan 0–2, M Grimes 0–1, L Grimes 0–1, J Moynihan 0–1.		J O'Halloran 1–0, T O'Connor 0–2, N McDonnell 0–1, M Moloney 0–1, G O'Dwyer 0–1, N Bridgeman 0–1.

19 August 1979 Quarter-final	Patrickswell	2–13 – 2–04	Doon	Bruff Grounds
	R Bennis 0–5, T O'Brien 1–1, F Nolan 0–4, T O'Brien 1–0, David Punch 0–1, P Foley 0–1, G Bourke 0–1.		W Moore 2–0, R Ryan 0–3, T McGrath 0–1.

=== Semi-finals ===
26 August 1979 Semi-final	Patrickswell	3–14 – 3–08	South Liberties	Bruff Grounds
	J Lynch 2–2, R Bennis 0–7, D Punch 1–2, G Hayes 0–3.		J McKenna 1–5, M O'Brien 1–0, M Butler 1–0, E Grimes 0–2, T Ryan 0–1.

9 September 1979 Semi-final	Tournafulla	1–13 – 1–11	Kilmallock	Gaelic Grounds
	D O'Connor 1–4, C Carroll 0–4, C Brouder 0–3, S Horgan 0–1, S Hartnett 0–1.		D O'Riordan 1–1, T Moloney 0–4, J Neenan 0–3, J O'Riordan 0–1, T O'Riordan 0–1, B Savage 0–1.

=== Final ===
23 September 1979 Final	Patrickswell	2–16 – 1–06	Tournafulla	Gaelic Grounds
	R Bennis 0–7, T O'Brien 1–1, J Lynch 1–0, S Foley 0–3, David Punch 0–2, P Foley 0–1, G Hayes 0–1, F Nolan 0–1.		C Brouder 1–0, P Horgan 0–3, D O'Connor 0–2, S Horgan 0–1.
