= Richie Bennis =

Irish hurler (born 1945)

Personal information
- Native name: Risteárd Ó Binéid (Irish)
- Born: 1945 (age 80–81) Patrickswell, County Limerick, Ireland
- Occupation: Retired builder
- Height: 6 ft 0 in (183 cm)

Sport
- Sport: Hurling
- Position: Centre-forward
Club
- Years: Club
- 1963–1987: Patrickswell
Club titles
- Limerick titles: 10
Inter-county*
Years	County	Apps (scores)
1965–1975	Limerick	19 (9-106)
Inter-county titles
- Munster titles: 2
- All-Irelands: 1
- NHL: 1
- All Stars: 1
- *Inter County team apps and scores correct as of 14:42, 27 June 2015.

Richard "Richie" Bennis (born 1945) is an Irish retired hurler who played as a centre-forward for the Limerick senior team.

Born in Patrickswell, County Limerick, Bennis first played competitive hurling during his schooling at CBS Sexton Street. He arrived on the inter-county scene at the age of seventeen when he first linked up with the Limerick minor team before later joining the under-21 side. He made his senior debut during the 1965–66 league. Bennis subsequently became a regular member of the starting fifteen and won one All-Ireland medal, two Munster medals and one National Hurling League medal. He was an All-Ireland runner-up on one occasion.

As a member of the Munster inter-provincial team on several occasions Bennis won one Railway Cup medal as a non-playing substitute. At club level he is a ten-time championship medallist with Patrickswell.

Bennis's career tally of 9 goals and 106 points ranks him as one of Limerick's top championship scorers of all time.

His brothers, Phil and Peter Bennis, and his nephew, Gary Kirby, also played for Limerick. Kirby is now the manager of the Patrickswell Senior Hurling Team.

Throughout his career Bennis made 19 championship appearances. His retirement came following the conclusion of the 1975 championship.

In retirement from playing Bennis became involved in team management and coaching. At club level he has been involved in the management of Camogue Rovers and Patrickswell before taking charge of the Limerick senior team.

== Playing career ==
=== School ===
During his secondary schooling in Limerick Bennis was chosen as captain of the Limerick City vocational schools' team. In 1961 he won an All-Ireland medal following a 10–6 to 7–9 defeat of Kilkenny.

=== Club ===
In 1965 Patrickswell, with six Bennis brothers on the team, qualified for the final of county championship for the first time ever. A 2–16 to 0-4 trouncing of St. Kieran's gave Bennis his first championship medal.

Patrickswell retained the title in 1966, with Bennis securing a second championship medal following a 5–11 to 3–7 defeat of St. Patrick's.

After failing in their bid for a third successive championship, Patrickswell reached the decider once again in 1969 where the team faced Pallasgreen. A 0–17 to 2–2 victory gave Bennis a third championship medal.

Patrickswell retained the title in 1970 with Bennis collecting a fourth championship medal following a 2–14 to 0-2 trouncing of Kilmallock.

After a period of decline, which involved the losing of three championship decider, Patrickswell returned to the final once again in 1977. Goals were key as a 3–7 to 0–7 defeat of Killeedy gave Bennis a fifth championship medal.

After failing to retain the title Patrickswell bounced back in 1979. Once again goals were vital in a 2–16 to 0–16 victory over Tournafulla, which gave Bennis a sixth championship medal.

In 1982 Patrickswell faced Bruree for the very first time in a county final. The overall craft and experience of Patrickswell, plus some shrewd tactical switches by their mentors, brought a late flurry of scores which finally sounded the death knell for Bruree, as Bennis collected a seventh championship medal following a 0–17 to 0–15 victory.

Patrickswell retained the title in 1983 with Bennis winning an eighth championship medal as Ballybrown were downed by 1–13 to 1–7.

In 1984 Patrickswell secured their own piece of history by capturing a third successive championship title. The 4–13 to 3–5 victory over Cappamore gave Bennis a ninth championship medal.

Four-in-a-row proved beyond Patrickswell, however, Bennis, who was now in his forties, was still a member of the team when the club contest their next final in 1987. A narrow 1–17 to 3–10 defeat of local rivals Ballybrown gave Bennis a tenth and final championship medal.

=== Inter-county ===
Bennis first came to prominence on the inter-county scene as a member of the Limerick minor hurling team in 1963. He was an unused substitute that year when Limerick defeated Tipperary by 4–12 to 5–4 to take the Munster crown. The subsequent All-Ireland decider saw Limerick face a 6–12 to 5–9 defeat by Wexford.

His tenure with the Limerick under-21 hurling team yielded little in terms of success.

Bennis made his senior debut during the 1965-66 league at a time when Limerick hurling was in the doldrums.

Limerick contested five successive league deciders between 1970 and 1974, with success coming in 1971. A narrow 3–12 to 3–11 defeat of old rivals Tipperary, when Bennis scoring a last-second free to win the game, gave him a National Hurling League medal.

In 1973 Limerick faced Tipperary in the provincial decider and a close game developed. The game ended in welter of excitement as, with time almost up and the sides level, a controversial '70 was awarded to Limerick. Bennis, as free-taker, was told by the match referee that it was the last puck of the game and that he must score directly. Some debate followed as to the validity of the score, with Tipperary players and supporters claiming the sliotar had drifted wide, however, the score was give and Bennis collected his first Munster medal following a 6–7 to 2–18 victory. On 2 September 1973 Limerick faced Kilkenny in the subsequent All-Ireland decider, however, the reigning champions had a depleted team due to a combination of injuries and emigration. In spite of this, the game hung in the balance for the first-half, however, eight minutes after the restart Mossie Dowling got a vital goal for Limerick. Shortly after this Bennis spearheaded a rampant Limerick attack which resulted in a 1–21 to 1–14 victory for Limerick. The victory gave Bennis an All-Ireland medal while he was later presented with his an All-Star.

Limerick maintained their provincial dominance in 1974, with Bennis winning a second Munster medal following a 6–14 to 3-9 trouncing of Clare. The subsequent All-Ireland decider on 1 September 1974 was a repeat of the previous year as Kilkenny provided the opposition once again. Limerick stormed to a five-point lead in the first eleven minutes, however, a converted penalty by Eddie Keher, supplemented by further goals from Mick Brennan and Pat Delaney gave Kilkenny a 3–19 to 1–13 victory.

In 1975 Limerick failed in their bid to win a third successive Munster title following a 3–14 to 0–12 defeat by Cork. This defeat brought the curtain down on Bennis's inter-county career.

=== Inter-provincial ===
Bennis was also chosen on the Munster inter-provincial team. He was first picked for duty in 1970, however, he remained as a non-playing substitute during Munster's 2–15 to 0–9 defeat of Leinster.

== Managerial career ==
=== Early experience ===
Shortly after retiring from club hurling Bennis remained active as a coach at all levels with Patrickswell. He later took charge of junior club Camogue Rovers but enjoyed little success.

=== Managing Limerick ===
In June 2006 Bennis was included as part of a four-man interim management team that was appointed in Limerick following Joe McKenna's resignation after a seventeen-point defeat to Clare. He took charge as manager of the team midway through a disastrous championship campaign. Limerick went on to win their subsequent qualifier games before narrowly losing to Cork by 0–19 to 0–19 in the All-Ireland quarter-final. At the end of the season Bennis was appointed Limerick manager on a full-time basis.

In his first full season in charge, Bennis's Limerick enjoyed a remarkable championship campaign and qualified for the All-Ireland decider against Kilkenny on 2 September 2007. The Cats got off to a flying start with Eddie Brennan and Henry Shefflin scoring two goals within the first ten minutes to set the tone. Limerick launched a second-half comeback, however, Kilkenny were too powerful and cruised to a 2–19 to 1–15 victory.

Limerick's 2008 championship campaign ended without a single victory, as defeats by Clare and Offaly resulted in Bennis's side being dumped out of the championship. In a subsequent interview with the Limerick Leader, Bennis criticized the social habits of a group of players whom he says "broke their hearts in training and then went drinking". He revealed how commitment to training was good but "some players let me down". Less than a month after this Bennis failed to have his contract renewed as Limerick manager.

== Career statistics ==
Team	Year	National League			Munster		All-Ireland		Total	
Team	Year	Division	Apps	Score	Apps	Score	Apps	Score	Apps	Score
Limerick	1965–66	Division 1B	2	0–01	0	0–00	—		2	0–01
Limerick	1966–67	Division 1B	5	3–06	1	1–02	—		6	4–08
Limerick	1967–68	Division 1B	1	0–04	1	0–00	—		2	0–04
Limerick	1968–69	Division 1B	3	0–00	0	0–00	—		3	0–00
Limerick	1969–70	Division 1B	6	3–36	3	0–11	—		9	3–47
Limerick	1970–71	Division 1B	9	0–54	3	2–25	—		12	2–79
Limerick	1971–72	Division 1B	7	4–36	1	0–02	—		8	4–38
Limerick	1972–73	Division 1B	8	8–37	2	1–08	2	1–17	12	10–62
Limerick	1973–74	Division 1B	8	1–39	2	3–14	1	0–05	11	4–58
Limerick	1974–75	Division 1B	5	2–13	3	1–21	—		8	3–34
Total			54	21-226	16	8-83	3	1-22	73	30-331

== Honours ==
=== Player ===
Patrickswell

- Limerick Senior Hurling Championship (10): 1965, 1966, 1969, 1970, 1977, 1979, 1982, 1983, 1984, 1987

Limerick City

- All-Ireland Vocational Schools Championship (1): 1961

Limerick

- All-Ireland Senior Hurling Championship (1): 1973
- Munster Senior Hurling Championship (2): 1973, 1974
- National Hurling League (1): 1970–71
- Munster Minor Hurling Championship (1): 1963 (sub)

Munster

- Railway Cup (1): 1970 (sub)

Sporting positions
Preceded by Joe McKenna	Limerick Senior Hurling Manager; 2006–2008	Succeeded by Justin McCarthy
