= 1988–89 All-Ireland Senior Club Hurling Championship =

All-Ireland Senior Club Hurling Championship 1988–89
Championship Details
- Dates: 25 September 1988 – 17 March 1989
- Teams: 29

All Ireland Champions
- Winners: Buffer's Alley (1st win)

All Ireland Runners-up
- Runners-up: O'Donovan Rossa

Provincial Champions
- Munster: Patrickswell
- Leinster: Buffer's Alley
- Ulster: O'Donovan Rossa
- Connacht: Four Roads

Championship Statistics
- Top Scorer: Gary Kirby (4–29)

The 1988–89 All-Ireland Senior Club Hurling Championship was the 19th staging of the All-Ireland Senior Club Hurling Championship, the Gaelic Athletic Association's premier inter-county club hurling tournament. The championship ran from 25 September 1988 to 17 March 1989.

Midleton of Cork were the defending champions, however, they failed to qualify after being beaten by Blackrock in the second round of the 1988 Cork SHC. Feakle of Clare made their championship debut.

The All-Ireland final was played at Croke Park in Dublin on 17 March 1989, between Buffers Alley of Wexford and O'Donovan Rossa of Antrim, in what was a first championship meeting between the teams. Buffers Alley won the match by 2–12 to 0–12 to claim their only title.

Patrickswell's Gary Kirby was the championship's top scorer with 4–29.

== Results ==
=== Connacht Senior Club Hurling Championship ===
First round

| 2 October 1988 First round | Gortletteragh | 3–08 – 2–06 | Tourlestrane | Cloone |

Second round

| 9 October 1988 Second round | North Mayo | 0–11 – 0–02 | Tourlestrane | Ballina |
| | M Linnane 0–3, C Collins 0–2, G O'Mara 0–2, G Ring 0–1, S Campion 0–1, K Delaney 0–1, P Armstrong 0–1, P Doherty 0–1. |

Semi-final

| 23 October 1988 Semi-final | Four Roads | 1–12 – 2–03 | North Mayo | Ballyforan |
| | P Dolan 0–4, M Donnelly 1–0, J McCarthy 0–2, T Fallon 0–2, F Carty 0–2, G Coyle 0–1, T Grehan 0–1. | | M Linanne 2–3. |

Final

| 20 November 1988 Final | Four Roads | 3–05 – 1–08 | Abbeyknockmoy | Ballyforan |
| | Paddy Dolan 1–2, Paul Dolan 1–1, S Coyle 1–1, M Cunniffe 0–1. | | P Blade 1–2, J Cooley 0–3, J Maher 0–2, T Devane 0–1. |

=== Leinster Senior Club Hurling Championship ===
First round

| 16 October 1988 First round | Brownstown | 2–13 – 1–03 | St. Kieran's | O'Reilly Park, Archerstown |
| | P Clancy 0–7, R Shaw 1–1, C Shaw 1–0, A Kelly 0–2, E Dolan 0–1, D Geraghty 0–1, J Leonard 0–1. | | C McCormack 1–0, M Carroll 0–3. |

| 16 October 1988 First round | Wolfe Tones | 3–05 – 7–12 | Trim | Drogheda |
| | S Matthews 1–1, S Bannon 1–1, D Stone 1–0, O Kelly 0–2, T Lowry 0–1. | | T Massey 4–2, D Murray 1–3, M Dempsey 1–1, F Hatton 1–0, D O'Keeffe 0–2, K Murray 0–2, F Foley 0–1, J O'Toole 0–1. |

| 16 October 1988 First round | Castledermot | 1–06 – 0–17 | Portlaoise | Geraldine Park, Athy |
| | J Gibbons 1–5, D O'Keeffe 0–1. | | P Bergin 0–6, L Bergin 0–5, B Bohane 0–4, M Keegan 0–1, M Cashin 0–1. |

| 23 October 1988 First round | Carlow | 2–05 – 0–04 | Barndarrig | Dr. Cullen Park, Carlow |
| | B Dunne 2–0, J Hayden 0–3, J Delaney 0–1, C Lowry 0–1. | | G Doyle 0–2, M Walsh 0–1, E England 0–1. |

Quarter-finals

| 22 October 1988 Quarter-final | Portlaoise | 1–09 – 2–06 | St. Vincent's | O'Moore Park, Portlaoise |
| | B Bohane 0–4, T Fitzpatrick 1–0, M Cashin 0–1, L Bergin 0–1, J Keenan 0–1, P Bergin 0–1. | | S McDermott 2–2, S Dalton 0–2, V Conroy 0–2. |

| 23 October 1988 Quarter-final | Brownstown | 1–05 – 2–07 | Ballyhale Shamrocks | O'Reilly Park, Archerstown |
| | E Dolan 1–0, J Fitzsimons 0–2, U Galligan 0–1, J Leonard 0–1, A Kelly 0–1. | | J Lawlor 2–0, G Fennelly 0–2, L Fennelly 0–2, S Fennelly 0–1, R Aylward 0–1, S Grace 0–1. |

| 29 October 1988 Quarter-final replay | St. Vincent's | 5–13 – 5–06 | Portlaoise | Parnell Park, Dublin |
| | S McDermott 1–5, S Dalton 0–5, V Conroy 1–1, S Loftus 1–1, P Tobin 1–1, A Devlin 1–0. | | P Bergin 2–0, M Deegan 1–0, L Bergin 1–0, J Taylor 1–0, B Bohane 0–3, N Rigney 0–2, P Cleary 0–1. |

| 5 November 1988 Quarter-final | Carlow | 4–06 – 5–08 | Buffer's Alley | Dr. Cullen Park, Carlow |
| | J Hayden 1–3, T Doyle 1–1, J Delaney 1–0, B Dunne 1–0, B Hayden 0–1, N Fallon 0–1. | | T Dempsey 2–2, M Butler 1–4, F O'Leary 2–0, M Casey 0–1, P Whelan 0–1. | Referee: P Delaney (Laois) |

| 5 November 1988 Quarter-final | Seir Kieran | 2–14 – 0–06 | Trim | St. Patrick's Park, Birr |
| | B Dooley 0–6, Joe Dooley 1–2, Johnny Dooley 0–4, K Dooley 1–0, J Commons 0–1, J Abbott 0–1. | | E McCaffrey 0–2, CJ Murtagh 0–1, T Massey 0–1, C Argue 0–1, K Murray 0–1. |

Semi-finals

| 19 November 1988 Semi-final | Ballyhale Shamrocks | 2–12 – 0–14 | St. Vincent's | Dr. Cullen Park, Carlow |
| | G Fennelly 0–7, M Kelly 1–1, D Fennelly 1–0, L Fennelly 0–2, J Lawlor 0–1, T Phelan 0–1. | | S McDermott 0–7, S Dalton 0–4, S Loftus 0–2, V Conroy 0–1. |

| 20 November 1988 Semi-final | Buffer's Alley | 1–12 – 1–07 | Seir Kieran | Geraldine Park, Athy |
| | S Whelan 1–2, T Dempsey 0–5, M Casey 0–2, T Doran 0–2, M Butler 0–1. | | Johnny Dooley 1–3, J Connors 0–2, P Mulrooney 0–1, B Dooley 0–1. |

Final

| 4 December 1988 Final | Buffer's Alley | 1–12 – 1–09 | Ballyhale Shamrocks | Dr. Cullen Park, Carlow |
| | M Butler 0–10, T Doran 1–0, M Casey 0–1, T Dempsey 0–1. | | G Fennelly 1–7, D Fennelly 0–2. | Referee: N O'Donoghue (Dublin) |

=== Munster Senior Club Hurling Championship ===
Quarter-finals

| 23 October 1988 Quarter-final | Feakle | 4–16 – 1–08 | Ballyduff | Cusack Park, Ennis |
| | V Donnellan 3–7, D Rochford 1–2, T Guilfoyle 0–3, D McGrath 0–2, J Touhy 0–1, K Breen 0–1. | | C Houlihan 1–1, M O'Sullivan 0–4, F Whelan 0–1, M Hennessy 0–1, J Barron 0–1. |

| 23 October 1988 Quarter-final | Patrickswell | 3–11 – 3–06 | St. Finbarr's | FitzGerald Park, Kilmallock |
| | G Kirby 1–8, G Hayes 1–0, C Carey 1–0, S Foley 0–1, D Punch 0–1, F Nolan 0–1. | | F O'Brien 2–0, T Linehan 1–2, J Cremin 0–2, J Meyler 0–1, W O'Connell 0–1. |

Semi-finals

| 20 November 1988 Semi-final | Loughmore-Castleiney | 0–09 – 1–12 | Patrickswell | Semple Stadium, Thurles |
| | P McGrath 0–7, T McGrath 0–1, T Larkin 0–1. | | G Kirby 0–8, G Hayes 1–1, C Carey 0–1, S Foley 0–1, S Kirby 0–1. | Referee: W Horgan (Cork) |

| 20 November 1988 Semi-final | Mount Sion | 1–08 – 1–07 | Feakle | Walsh Park, Waterford |
| | S Ahearne 0–5, D Power 1–0, G Fitzpatrick 0–3. | | M Callinan 1–0, V Donnellan 0–3, T Guilfoyle 0–1, M Guilfoyle 0–1, J Touhy 0–1, R Nelson 0–1. | Referee: G Ryan (Tipperary) |

Final

| 4 December 1988 Final | Patrickswell | 3–13 – 2–13 | Mount Sion | Semple Stadium, Thurles |
| | G Kirby 1–4, G Hayes 1–2, S Foley 1–1, C Carey 0–2, F Nolan 0–2, A Carmody 0–1, S Kirby 0–1. | | S Ahearne 2–6, P McGrath 0–3, D Loughnane 0–2, D Power 0–1, P Ryan 0–1. | Referee: W Horgan (Cork) |

=== Ulster Senior Club Hurling Championship ===
Semi-finals

| 25 September 1988 Semi-final | Cúchulainns | 0–04 – 5–13 | Ruairí Óg | Athletic Grounds, Armagh |
| | G Bradsahw 0–1, P Devlin 0–1, J Devlin 0–1, A Corvan 0–1. | | D McNaughton 2–6, F McAllister 1–4, J Carson 1–0, A McGuile 1–0, L McKeegan 0–1, A McAllister 0–1, B McGaughey 0–1. |

| 25 September 1988 Semi-final | Lavey | 1–11 – 2–07 | Portaferry | Gulladuff |
| | H Downey 0–9, D Roughan 1–0, O Collins 0–1, S Downey 0–1, D Mulholland 0–1. | | A McGeehan 1–3, B Coulter 1–0, K Fitzsimmons 0–2, C McGeehan 0–2. |

Final

| 23 October 1988 Final | O'Donovan Rossa | 0–13 – 0–11 | Lavey | Rossa Park, Belfast |
| | N Murray 0–9, C Murphy 0–2, D Armstrong 0–1, S Shannon 0–1. | | H Downey 0–5, S Downey 0–3, D Mulholland 0–3. |

=== All-Ireland Senior Club Hurling Championship ===
Quarter-final

| 29 January 1989 Quarter-final | Patrickswell | 2–15 – 0–07 | Desmonds | Gaelic Grounds, Limerick |
| | G Kirby 1–5, S Foley 1–1, C Carey 0–3, S Kirby 0–2, A Carmody 0–2, P Foley 0–1, G Hayes 0–1. | | M Burke 0–2, M Cahill 0–2, F O'Donoghue 0–1, P O'Donoghue 0–1, A O'Halloran 0–1. |

Semi-finals

| 12 February 1989 Semi-final | Buffer's Alley | 2–19 – 0–09 | Four Roads | Wexford Park, Wexford |
| | M Butler 0–9, T Dempsey 1–4, S O'Leary 1–1, T Doran 0–3, M Casey 0–2. | | P Dolan 0–4, T Fallon 0–2, J McCarthy 0–1, P Dolan 0–1, F McCarthy 0–1. |

| 12 February 1989 Semi-final | Patrickswell | 2–08 – 2–09 | O'Donovan Rossa | FitzGerald Park, Kilmallock |
| | G Kirby 1–4, S Kirby 1–0, C Carey 0–2, A Carmody 0–1, F Nolan 0–1. | | N Murray 1–2, C Murray 1–0, C Barr 0–3, J Reilly 0–2, J Fagin 0–1, A Murray 0–1. |

Final

| 17 March 1989 Final | Buffer's Alley | 2–12 – 0–12 | O'Donovan Rossa | Croke Park, Dublin |
| | P Donoghue 1–1, T Dempsey 0–4, S Ó Laoire 1–0, T Doran 0–3, M Butler 0–2, S Whelan 0–1, M Foley 0–1. | | C Barr 0–5, N Murray 0–2, D Armstrong 0–1, A Murray 0–1, C Murphy 0–1, J Reilly 0–1, P Rogan 0–1. | Referee: W Horgan (Cork) |

== Championship statistics ==
=== Top scorers ===
Top scorers overall

| Rank | Player | Club | Tally | Total | Matches | Average |
|---|---|---|---|---|---|---|
| 1 | Gary Kirby | Patrickswell | 4–29 | 41 | 5 | 8.20 |
| 2 | Mick Butler | Buffers Alley | 1–26 | 29 | 5 | 5.80 |
| 3 | Tom Dempsey | Buffers Alley | 3–16 | 25 | 5 | 5.00 |
| 4 | Val Donnellan | Feakle | 3–10 | 19 | 2 | 9.50 |
| 4 | Ger Fennelly | Ballyhale Shamrocks | 1–16 | 19 | 3 | 6.33 |
| 5 | Shane Ahearne | Mount Sion | 2–11 | 17 | 2 | 8.50 |
| 6 | Noel Murray | O'Donovan Rossa | 1–13 | 16 | 3 | 5.66 |
| 7 | Tim Massey | Trim | 4-03 | 15 | 2 | 7.50 |
| 8 | Henry Downey | Lavey | 0–14 | 14 | 2 | 7.00 |
| 9 | Paddy Dolan | Four Roads | 1–10 | 13 | 3 | 4.33 |

Top scorers in a single game

| Rank | Player | Club | Tally | Total | Opposition |
|---|---|---|---|---|---|
| 1 | Val Donnellan | Feakle | 3-07 | 16 | Ballyduff |
| 2 | Tim Massey | Trim | 4-02 | 14 | Wolfe Tones |
| 3 | Danny McNaughton | Ruairí Óg | 2-06 | 12 | Cúchulainns |
| 4 | Gary Kirby | Patrickswell | 1-08 | 11 | St. Finbarr's |
| 5 | Ger Fennelly | Ballyhale Shamrocks | 1-07 | 10 | Buffers Alley |
| 5 | Mick Butler | Buffers Alley | 0–10 | 10 | Ballyhale Shamrocks |
| 6 | Martin Linnane | North Mayo | 2-03 | 9 | Four Roads |
| 6 | Henry Downey | Lavey | 0-09 | 9 | Portaferry |
| 6 | Noel Murray | O'Donovan Rossa | 0-09 | 9 | Lavey |
| 6 | Mick Butler | Buffers Alley | 0-09 | 9 | Four Roads |
