= 1969 Limerick Senior Hurling Championship =

Annual hurling competition season

- Teams: 22
- Champions: Patrickswell (3rd title); Tony O'Brien (captain)
- Runners-up: Pallasgreen; Connie O'Dwyer (captain)

Tournament statistics
- Matches played: 17
- Goals scored: 108 (6.35 per match)
- Points scored: 299 (17.59 per match)

The 1969 Limerick Senior Hurling Championship was the 75th staging of the Limerick Senior Hurling Championship since its establishment by the Limerick County Board.

Claughaun were the defending champions, however, they were defeated by Patrickswell in the second round.

On 5 October 1969, Patrickswell won the championship after a 0–17 to 2–03 defeat of Pallasgreen in the final. It was their third championship title overall and their first title in three championship seasons.

== Results ==
=== First round ===
First round	Claughaun	3–04 – 3–00	Kilmallock

First round	Patrickswell	w/o – scr.	Boher

First round	Croom	5–12 – 2–03	Treaty Sarsfields

First round	Feohanagh	5–07 – 1–08	Young Irelands

=== Second round ===
Second round	Doon	3–10 – 4–04	Cappamore

Second round	Pallasgreen	3–13 – 4–04	Bruree

Second round	Ballybrown	w/o – scr.	Dromcollogher

Second round	St. Patrick's	4–09 – 3–09	Adare

Second round	Old Christians	5–07 – 5–07	Ahane

Second round replay	Old Christians	5–13 – 1–02	Ahane

Second round	South Liberties	3–09 – 4–01	Fedamore

Second round	Patrickswell	1–14 – 3–07	Claughaun

Second round	Croom	5–06 – 2–03	Feohanagh

=== Third round ===
Third round	Pallasgreen	4–09 – 2–09	Doon

Third round	St. Patrick's	5–11 – 2–01	Ballybrown

Third round	South Liberties	7–10 – 2–05	Old Christians

Third round	Patrickswell	3–06 – 1–05	Croom

=== Semi-finals ===
Semi-final	Pallasgreen	3–06 – 1–09	St. Patrick's

Semi-final	Patrickswell	2–14 – 0–08	South Liberties

=== Final ===
5 October 1969 Final	Patrickswell	0–17 – 2–03	Pallasgreen	Gaelic Grounds, Limerick
	R Bennis 0–9, P Carey 0–3, Peter Bennis 0–2, F Nolan 0–2, L Foley 0–1.		M Power 2–0, T Creed 0–2, J Howard 0–1.	Referee: M Slattery (Clare)
