= Patrickswell GAA =

Gaelic sports club in County Limerick, Ireland

Patrickswell
- Tobar Phádraig
- Founded: 1943
- County: Limerick
- Nickname: The Well
- Colours
- Grounds: Páirc Antóin Ó Briain
- Coordinates: 52°35′56.91″N 8°42′53.59″W

Playing kits
Standard colours

Senior Club Championships
	All Ireland	Munster champions	Limerick champions
Hurling:	0	2	20

Patrickswell GAA is a Gaelic Athletic Association club in Patrickswell, County Limerick, Ireland. The club is primarily concerned with the game of hurling, but has also fielded teams in Gaelic football.

== History ==
Located in the village of Patrickswell, about 10km outside Limerick, Patrickswell GAA Club was founded in 1943. The club spent its early existence operating in the junior grades, winning Limerick JAHC titles in 1955 and 1957. This was followed by a Limerick JAFC title in 1964. After voting to remain in the senior grade, Patrickswell made the breakthrough by winning consecutive Limerick SHC titles in 1965 and 1966.

After their initial title success, Patrickswell proceeded to dominate the local club hurling scene. 16 titles were claimed between 1965 and 1997 to put them equal with all-time record holders Ahane. The club also won two Munster Club SHC titles during that period, as well as losing to Glenmore in the 1991 All-Ireland club final.

Patrickswell and Ahane continued their battle to be outright leaders on the all-time roll of honour at the turn of the century. After a 13-year lapse, Patrickswell drew level once again after claiming their 19th Limerick SHC title in 2016. Patrickswell beat Na Piarsaigh by 1-17 to 0-15 to claim a record 20th SHC title in 2019.

== Honours ==
- Munster Senior Club Hurling Championship (2): 1988, 1990
- Limerick Senior Hurling Championship (20): 1965, 1966, 1969, 1970, 1977, 1979, 1982, 1983, 1984, 1987, 1988, 1990, 1993, 1995, 1996, 1997, 2000, 2003, 2016, 2019
- Limerick Junior A Hurling Championship (3): 1955, 1957, 1999
- Limerick Junior A Football Championship (3): 1964, 1970, 1978
- Limerick Under-21 A Hurling Championships: (9): 1968, 1969, 1971, 1975, 1976, 1977, 1994, 1996, 1997
- Limerick Minor A Hurling Championships (5): 1968, 1984, 1994, 2007, 2008

== Notable players ==
- Phil Bennis: All-Ireland SHC-winner (1973)
- Richie Bennis: All-Ireland SHC-winner (1973)
- Diarmaid Byrnes: All-Ireland SHC-winner (2018, 2020, 2021, 2022, 2023)
- Ciarán Carey: All-Ireland SHC runner-up (1994, 1996)
- Leonard Enright: All-Ireland SHC runner-up (1980)
- Seán Foley: All-Ireland SHC-winner (1973)
- Aaron Gillane: All-Ireland SHC-winner (2018, 2020, 2021, 2022, 2023)
- Gary Kirby: All-Ireland SHC runner-up (1994, 1996)
- Cian Lynch: All-Ireland SHC-winner (2018, 2020, 2021, 2022, 2023)
- Frankie Nolan: All-Ireland SHC-winner (1973)
- Eoin Hennessy: Vice-Captain of All Ireland MHC success (2026)
- Ryan Foley: All Ireland MHC winner (2026)
- John Murray: All Ireland MHC winner (2026)
- Callum Butler: All Ireland MHC winner (2026)
