= Tournafulla GAA =

Gaelic sports club in County Limerick, Ireland

Tournafulla
- Tuar na Fola
- Founded: 1899
- County: Limerick
- Colours: Green and white
- Grounds: Páirc Mhic Chárthaigh

Playing kits
Standard colours

Tournafulla GAA is a Gaelic Athletic Association club located in Tournafulla, County Limerick, Ireland. The club is primarily concerned with the game of hurling.

== History ==
Located in the village of Tournafulla in West Limerick, Tournafulla GAA Club was founded by Fr. Michael Byrne in 1889. The club has competed in all grades of hurling in Limerick, however, as the county's smallest, the club has struggled to field teams on occasions due to emigration.

Tournafulla has had a number of championship successes over the years, however, one of the club's biggest occasions was appearing in the 1979 SHC final, only to lose to Patrickswell. In the 2003 season, the club won the Limerick IHC, Limerick U21HC and Limerick JBHL titles. Tournafulla won the Limerick JAHC title in 2018 after beating rivals Killeedy in the final.

== Honours ==
- Limerick Intermediate Hurling Championship (1): 2003
- Limerick Junior Hurling Championship (1): 2018

== Notable players ==
- Tim Doody: All-Ireland SHC-winner (1901)
- Séamus Horgan: All-Ireland SHC-winner (1973)
