= Ger Hegarty =

Irish hurler

Personal information
- Native name: Gearóid Ó hÉigeartaigh (Irish)
- Born: 1966 (age 59–60) Limerick, Ireland
- Occupation: Bank official
- Height: 6 ft 3 in (191 cm)

Sport
- Sport: Hurling
- Position: Centre-back
Club
- Years: Club
- Old Christians
Club titles
- Limerick titles: 0
Inter-county
- Years: County
- 1985-1998: Limerick
Inter-county titles
- Munster titles: 1
- All-Irelands: 0
- NHL: 1
- All Stars: 0

Ger Hegarty (born 1966) is an Irish retired hurler. At club level, he played with Old Christians and at inter-county level with the Limerick senior hurling team.

== Career ==
Hegarty played hurling at all grades as a student at Limerick CBS. He was part of the school's senior team that lost to St Finbarr's College in the final of the Dr Harty Cup in 1984.

At club level, Hegarty first played for Old Christians at juvenile and underage levels, before eventually progressing to adult level. He won a Limerick IHC medal in 1991, after scoring 0-07 in the final against Bruree.

At inter-county level, Hegarty first played for Limerick as part of the minor team that beat Kilkenny to win the All-Ireland MHC title in 1984. He progressed to the under-21 team and won consecutive Munster U21HC titles, before claiming an All-Ireland U21HC medal after a 2-15 to 3-06 win over Galway in the 1987 final.

Hegarty joined the senior team during the 1985–86 National League. It was in that competition that he collected his first silverware when Limerick claimed the league title in 1992. Hegarty later won a Munster SHC medal, before lining out in Limerick's defeat by Offaly in the 1994 All-Ireland final.

A series of injuries severely impacted on Hegarty's inter-county career. A cruciate ligament tear occurred in his left knee in a challenge game against Tipperary in 1992. Hegarty suffered a similar injury in his right knee in 1995.

Performances at inter-county level for Limerick resulted in Hegarty being called up to the Munster inter-provincial team. He made his only appearance in 1991 but failed to win a Railway Cup medal.

== Personal life ==
His son, Gearóid Hegarty, has won six All-Ireland SHC medals with Limerick.

== Honours ==
South Liberties

- Limerick Under-21 Football Championship: 1985, 1986

Limerick

- Munster Senior Hurling Championship: 1994, 1996
- National Hurling League: 1991–92, 1997
- All-Ireland Under-21 Hurling Championship: 1987
- Munster Under-21 Hurling Championship: 1986, 1987
- All-Ireland Minor Hurling Championship: 1984
- Munster Minor Hurling Championship: 1984

Munster

- Railway Cup: 1995, 1996
