= Don Flynn (hurler) =

Irish hurler

Personal information
- Native name: Dónal Ó Floinn (Irish)
- Born: 1966 (age 59–60) Killeedy, County Limerick, Ireland

Sport
- Sport: Hurling
- Position: Left corner-back
Clubs
- Years: Club
- Killeedy → Western Gaels
Club titles
- Limerick titles: 0
College
- Years: College
- NIHE Limerick
College titles
- Fitzgibbon titles: 0
Inter-county
- Years: County
- 1987-1994: Limerick
Inter-county titles
- Munster titles: 1
- All-Irelands: 0
- NHL: 1
- All Stars: 0

Don Flynn (born 1966) is an Irish hurling coach and former player. At club level, he played with Killeedy and at inter-county level with the Limerick senior hurling team.

== Playing career ==
Flynn first played hurling at juvenile and underage levels with the Killeedy club, before eventually progressing to adult level. He won a Limerick IHC medal in 1992 after Killeedy's 0-14 to 1-05 defeat of Boher in the final.

At inter-county level, Flynn first played for Limerick as part of the minor team that beat Kilkenny to win the All-Ireland MHC title in 1984. He progressed to the under-21 team and won consecutive Munster U21HC titles, before claiming an All-Ireland U21HC medal after a 2-15 to 3-06 win over Galway in the 1987 final.

Flynn made his first appearance for the senior team in a challenge game against Tipperary in a challenge game in January 1987. He was later part of the Limerick team that won the National Hurling League title in 1992. Flynn also won a Munster SHC medal and was a non-playing substitute for Limerick's defeat by Offaly in the 1994 All-Ireland final.

== Management career ==
In retirement from playing, Flynn became involved in team management and coaching. He served a two-year spell as manager of Limerick's intermediate team.

== Honours ==
Killeedy

- Limerick Intermediate Hurling Championship: 1992
- Limerick Junior B Hurling Championship: 2005

Limerick

- Munster Senior Hurling Championship: 1994, 1996
- National Hurling League: 1991–92, 1997
- All-Ireland Under-21 Hurling Championship: 1987
- Munster Under-21 Hurling Championship: 1986, 1987
- All-Ireland Minor Hurling Championship: 1984
- Munster Minor Hurling Championship: 1984

Munster

- Railway Cup: 1995, 1996
