= Declan Nash =

Irish hurler

Personal information
- Native name: Déaglán de Nais (Irish)
- Born: 10 July 1966 (age 60) Limerick, Ireland
- Occupation: Quantity surveyor
- Height: 5 ft 9 in (175 cm)

Sport
- Sport: Hurling
- Position: Left wing-back
Club
- Years: Club
- South Liberties
Club titles
- Limerick titles: 0
College
- Years: College
- 1984-1988: Moylish College
College titles
- Fitzgibbon titles: 0
Inter-county
- Years: County
- 1987-1999: Limerick
Inter-county titles
- Munster titles: 2
- All-Irelands: 0
- NHL: 2
- All Stars: 0

Declan Nash (born 10 July 1966) is an Irish hurling selector and former player. At club level, he played with South Liberties and at inter-county level with the Limerick senior hurling team.

== Playing career ==
Nash played hurling at all grades as a student at Limerick CBS. He was part of the school's senior team that lost to St Finbarr's College in the final of the Dr Harty Cup in 1984. At club level, Nash played hurling and Gaelic football with South Liberties. He won consecutive Limerick U21FC titles in 1985 and 1986.

At inter-county level, Nash first played for Limerick as part of the minor team that beat Kilkenny to win the All-Ireland MHC title in 1984. He progressed to the under-21 team and won consecutive Munster U21HC titles, before claiming an All-Ireland U21HC medal after a 2-15 to 3-06 win over Galway in the 1987 final.

Nash joined the senior team during the 1987–88 National League. It was in that competition that he collected his first silverware when Limerick claimed the league title in 1992. Nash won Munster SHC medals in 1994 and 1996, however, Limerick faced subsequent All-Ireland final defeats by Offaly and Wexford respectively. He added a second National League medal to his collection in 1997.

Performances at inter-county level for Limerick resulted in Nash being called up to the Munster inter-provincial team. He won consecutive Railway Cup medals in 1995 and 1996.

== Management career ==
Nash served as a selector during Pad Joe Whelehan's term as manager of the Limerick senior hurling team. His tenure as part of the management team saw him resign twice from the role in the space of a few months.

== Personal life ==
His brother, Mike Nash, played alongside him during Limerick's Munster SHC successes in 1994 and 1996. His nephew, Anthony Nash, lined out in goal with the Cork senior hurling team and won four Munster SHC medals.

== Honours ==
South Liberties

- Limerick Under-21 Football Championship: 1985, 1986

Limerick

- Munster Senior Hurling Championship: 1994, 1996
- National Hurling League: 1991–92, 1997
- All-Ireland Under-21 Hurling Championship: 1987
- Munster Under-21 Hurling Championship: 1986, 1987
- All-Ireland Minor Hurling Championship: 1984
- Munster Minor Hurling Championship: 1984

Munster

- Railway Cup: 1995, 1996
