= Anthony Carmody =

Irish hurler

Personal information
- Native name: Antóin Ó Ceamada (Irish)
- Born: 1966 (age 59–60) Patrickswell, County Limerick, Ireland

Sport
- Sport: Hurling
- Position: Midfield
Club
- Years: Club
- 1983-2003: Patrickswell
Club titles
- Limerick titles: 11
- Munster titles: 2
- All-Ireland Titles: 0
Inter-county
- Years: County
- 1987-1992: Limerick
Inter-county titles
- Munster titles: 0
- All-Irelands: 0
- NHL: 1
- All Stars: 0

Anthony Carmody (born 1966) is an Irish former hurler. At club level, he played with Patrickswell and at inter-county level with the Limerick senior hurling team.

== Career ==
Carmody played hurling at all grades as a student at Limerick CBS. He was part of the school's senior team that lost to St Finbarr's College in the final of the Dr Harty Cup in 1984.

At club level, Carmody began his career at juvenile and underage levels with Patrickswell, winning a Limerick MAHC title in 1984, before progressing to adult level. Carmody's senior career coincided with a very successful era for Patrickswell and he won 11 Limerick SHC medals in a 20-year period between 1983 and 2003. His other club honours include two Munster Club SHC medals, while he lined out at midfield when losing to Glenmore in the 1991 All-Ireland club final.

At inter-county level, Carmody first played for Limerick as part of the minor team that beat Kilkenny to win the All-Ireland MHC title in 1984. He progressed to the under-21 team and won consecutive Munster U21HC titles, before claiming an All-Ireland U21HC medal after a 2-15 to 3-06 win over Galway in the 1987 final. Carmody joined the senior team in 1987. He captained the team during the 1991 season. Carmody claimed his only senior silverware in 1992 when Limerick won the National Hurling League title.

== Honours ==
Patrickswell

- Munster Senior Club Hurling Championship: 1988, 1990
- Limerick Senior Hurling Championship: 1983, 1984, 1987, 1988, 1990, 1993, 1995, 1996, 1997, 2000 (c), 2003
- Limerick Minor A Hurling Championship: 1984

Limerick

- National Hurling League: 1991–92
- All-Ireland Under-21 Hurling Championship: 1987
- Munster Under-21 Hurling Championship: 1986, 1987
- All-Ireland Minor Hurling Championship: 1984
- Munster Minor Hurling Championship: 1984

Sporting positions
Preceded by Terence Kenny	Limerick senior hurling team captain 1991	Succeeded by Joe O'Connor
