= John O'Neill (Limerick hurler) =

Irish hurler

Personal information
- Native name: Seán Ó Néill (Irish)
- Born: 1966 (age 59–60) Kilfinane, County Limerick, Ireland

Sport
- Sport: Hurling
- Position: Midfield
Club
- Years: Club
- Blackrock
Club titles
- Limerick titles: 0
Inter-county
- Years: County
- 1993-1994: Limerick
Inter-county titles
- Munster titles: 1
- All-Irelands: 0
- NHL: 0
- All Stars: 0

John O'Neill (born 1966) is an Irish former hurler. At club level, he played with Blackrock and at inter-county level with the Limerick senior hurling team.

== Career ==
O'Neill began his hurling career at juvenile and underage levels with Blackrock. He progressed to adult level and won a Limerick IHC medal after a 2–04 to 0–08 defeat of Na Piarsaigh in the final.

At inter-county level, O'Neill first played for Limerick as part of the minor team that beat Kilkenny to win the All-Ireland MHC title in 1984. He progressed to the under-21 team and won consecutive Munster U21HC titles, before claiming an All-Ireland U21HC medal after a 2–15 to 3–06 win over Galway in the 1987 final.

O'Neill was drafted onto the senior team in 1993 and was part of the team that won the Munster SHC the following year after a defeat of Clare in the final. He was an unused substitute for Limerick's defeat by Offaly in the 1994 All-Ireland final.

== Honours ==
Blackrock

- Limerick Intermediate Hurling Championship: 1993

Limerick

- Munster Senior Hurling Championship: 1994
- All-Ireland Under-21 Hurling Championship: 1987
- Munster Under-21 Hurling Championship: 1986, 1987
- All-Ireland Minor Hurling Championship: 1984
- Munster Minor Hurling Championship: 1984
