= Mike Reale =

Irish hurler

Personal information
- Native name: Mícheál Roghaill (Irish)
- Born: 26 June 1966 (age 60) Patrickswell, County Limerick, Ireland
- Occupation: Construction company owner
- Height: 6 ft 0 in (183 cm)

Sport
- Sport: Hurling
- Position: Left wing-back
Club
- Years: Club
- Bruff
Club titles
- Limerick titles: 0
Inter-county
- Years: County
- 1988-1993: Limerick
Inter-county titles
- Munster titles: 0
- All-Irelands: 0
- NHL: 1
- All Stars: 0

Michael Reale (born 26 June 1966) is an Irish former hurler. At club level, he played with Bruff and at inter-county level with the Limerick senior hurling team.

== Career ==
At club level, Reale began his career at juvenile and underage levels with Bruff as a dual player. He won a Limerick MAHC medal in 1983 before claiming a Limerick MAFC medal the following year. Reale progressed to adult level, also as a dual player, and won a Limerick JAFC medal in 1987 after a 2-07 to 1-03 win over St Patrick's. He won a Limerick IHC medal two years later after a defeat of Old Christians in the final.

At inter-county level, Reale first played for Limerick as part of the minor team that beat Kilkenny to win the All-Ireland MHC title in 1984. He progressed to the under-21 team and won consecutive Munster U21HC titles, before claiming an All-Ireland U21HC medal after a 2-15 to 3-06 win over Galway in the 1987 final.

Reale joined the senior team in 1988. He claimed his only senior silverware in 1992 when Limerick won the National Hurling League title.

== Honours ==
Bruff

- Limerick Intermediate Hurling Championship: 1989
- Limerick Junior A Football Championship: 1987
- Limerick Minor A Football Championship: 1984
- Limerick Minor A Hurling Championship: 1983

Limerick

- National Hurling League: 1991–92
- All-Ireland Under-21 Hurling Championship: 1987
- Munster Under-21 Hurling Championship: 1986, 1987
- All-Ireland Minor Hurling Championship: 1984
- Munster Minor Hurling Championship: 1984
