= Anthony Madden =

Irish hurler

Personal information
- Native name: Antóin Ó Maidin (Irish)
- Born: 1987 (age 38–39) Bruff, County Limerick, Ireland

Sport
- Sport: Hurling
- Position: Centre-back
Club
- Years: Club
- Bruff
Club titles
- Limerick titles: 0
Inter-county
- Years: County
- 1988-1989: Limerick
Inter-county titles
- Munster titles: 0
- All-Irelands: 0
- NHL: 0
- All Stars: 0

Anthony Madden (born 1967) is an Irish former hurler. At club level, he played with Bruff and at inter-county level with the Limerick senior hurling team.

== Career ==
At club level, Madden began his career at juvenile and underage levels with Bruff and won a Limerick MAHC medal in 1983 after beating Claughaun by 1–07 to 1–06 in the final. He progressed to adult level and won a Limerick IHC medal in 1989 after a defeat of Old Christians in a final replay.

At inter-county level, Madden first played for Limerick as part of the minor team that beat Kilkenny to win the All-Ireland MHC title in 1984. He progressed to the under-21 team and won consecutive Munster U21HC titles, before claiming an All-Ireland U21HC medal after a 2–15 to 3–06 win over Galway in the 1987 final. Madden later spent a brief period with the senior team.

== Honours ==
Bruff

- Limerick Intermediate Hurling Championship: 1989
- Limerick Minor Hurling Championship: 1983

Limerick

- All-Ireland Under-21 Hurling Championship: 1987
- Munster Under-21 Hurling Championship: 1986, 1987
- All-Ireland Minor Hurling Championship: 1984
- Munster Minor Hurling Championship: 1984
