= Anthony O'Riordan =

Irish hurler (born 1966)

Personal information
- Native name: Antóin Ó Riordáin (Irish)
- Born: 1966 (age 59–60) Bruff, County Limerick, Ireland

Sport
- Sport: Hurling
- Position: Centre-back
Club
- Years: Club
- Bruff
Club titles
- Limerick titles: 0
Inter-county
- Years: County
- 1987-1993: Limerick
Inter-county titles
- Munster titles: 0
- All-Irelands: 0
- NHL: 0
- All Stars: 0

Anthony O'Riordan (born 1966) is an Irish hurling coach and former player. At club level, he played with Bruff and at inter-county level with the Limerick senior hurling team.

== Playing career ==
O'Riordan first played hurling at juvenile and underage levels with the Bruff club. He was part of the club's minor team that beat Claughaun by 1-07 to 1-06 to claim the Limerick MHC title in 1983. O'Riordan later progressed to adult level as a dual player. He won a Limerick JAFC medal in 1987 when Bruff beat St Patrick's by seven points in the final.

At inter-county level, O'Riordan first played for Limerick as captain of the minor team that beat Kilkenny to win the All-Ireland MHC title in 1984. He progressed to the under-21 team and won consecutive Munster U21HC titles, before claiming an All-Ireland U21HC medal after a 2-15 to 3-06 win over Galway in the 1987 final.

O'Riordan joined the senior team during the 1987–88 National League. He was part of Limerick's National Hurling League-winning season in 1992, however, he missed the semi-final and final as he was on his honeymoon.

== Management career ==
O'Riordan was a selector during Richie Bennis's term as manager of the Limerick senior team. His tenure included Limerick's 2-17 to 1-15 defeat by Kilkenny in the 2007 All-Ireland final. O'Riordan later served as a selector with the intermediate team under Leo O'Connor.

== Honours ==
Bruff

- Limerick Junior A Football Championship: 1987
- Limerick Minor Hurling Championship: 1983

Limerick

- All-Ireland Under-21 Hurling Championship: 1987
- Munster Under-21 Hurling Championship: 1986, 1987
- All-Ireland Minor Hurling Championship: 1984 (c)
- Munster Minor Hurling Championship: 1984 (c)

Achievements
Preceded by Anthony Cunningham	All-Ireland Minor Hurling Final winning captain 1984	Succeeded by Michael O'Mahony
