= Leo O'Connor (hurler) =

Irish hurler from Limerick

Personal information
- Native name: Leo Ó Conchubhair (Irish)
- Born: 1967 (age 58–59) Limerick, Ireland

Sport
- Sport: Hurling
- Position: Left wing-forward
Club
- Years: Club
- 1985-2006: Claughaun
Club titles
	Football	Hurling
Limerick titles	6	1
Inter-county
Years	County	Apps (scores)
1988-1994	Limerick	6 (2-05)
Inter-county titles
- Munster titles: 1
- All-Irelands: 0
- NHL: 1
- All Stars: 0

Leo O'Connor (born 1967) is an Irish hurling manager and former player. At club level, he played hurling and Gaelic football with Claughaun and at inter-county level with the Limerick senior hurling team.

== Playing career ==
O'Connor played hurling at all grades as a student at Limerick CBS. He was part of the school's senior team that lost to St Finbarr's College in the final of the Dr Harty Cup in 1984.

At club level, O'Connor began his career as a dual player at juvenile and underage levels with Claughaun, winning a Limerick MAFC title in 1985, as well as Limerick U21AHC medals in 1984 and 1987. After beginning his career as a goalkeeper, he later became an outfield player after progressing to senior level. O'Connor was part of the Claughaun teams that claimed a SHC-SFC double in 1986. He claimed a further five Limerick SFC medals between 1988 and 1996. O'Connor ended his club career after adding a Limerick IHC medal to his collection in 2006.

At inter-county level, O'Connor first played for Limerick as part of the minor team that beat Kilkenny to win the All-Ireland MHC title in 1984. He progressed to the under-21 team and won consecutive Munster U21HC titles, before claiming an All-Ireland U21HC medal after a 2-15 to 3-06 win over Galway in the 1987 final.

O'Connor joined the senior team in 1988, but was on and off the team over the course of the following few years. He collected his first silverware as a panel member when Limerick won the National Hurling League title in 1992. O'Connor later won a Munster SHC medal, before lining out in Limerick's defeat by Offaly in the 1994 All-Ireland final.

== Management career ==
In retirement from playing, O'Connor became involved in team management and coaching at all levels. As Limerick's under-21 team manager, he guided them to the Munster U21HC title in 2011. He also became coach of the Mayo senior hurling team before returning to Limerick as minor and intermediate team manager.

O'Connor later became heavily involved with Offaly and managed the minor team to a defeat by Tipperary in the 2022 All-Ireland minor final. He continued his association with the team as under-21 manager, however, Offaly lost the 2023 All-Ireland under-20 final to Cork. O'Connor's under-21 team claimed the All-Ireland U20HC title after beating Tipperary by 2-20 to 2-14 in the 2024 All-Ireland under-21 final.

== Honours ==
=== Player ===
Claughaun

- Limerick Senior Football Championship: 1986, 1988, 1989, 1993, 1995, 1996
- Limerick Senior Hurling Championship: 1986
- Limerick Intermediate Hurling Championship: 2006
- Limerick Under-21 Hurling Championship: 1984, 1987
- Limerick Minor Football Championship: 1985

Limerick

- National Hurling League: 1991–92
- Munster Senior Hurling Championship: 1994
- All-Ireland Under-21 Hurling Championship: 1987
- Munster Under-21 Hurling Championship: 1987
- All-Ireland Minor Hurling Championship: 1984
- Munster Minor Hurling Championship: 1984

=== Management ===
Limerick

- Munster Under-21 Hurling Championship: 2011

Offaly

- All-Ireland Under-20 Hurling Championship: 2024
- Leinster Under-20 Hurling Championship: 2023, 2024
- Leinster Minor Hurling Championship: 2022

Sporting positions
Preceded by Gus Ryan	Limerick under-21 hurling team captain 1988	Succeeded by
Preceded by Ciarán Carey	Limerick under-21 hurling team manager 2009-2011	Succeeded by John Fitzgerald
Preceded by Brian Ryan	Limerick minor hurling team manager 2014-2015	Succeeded by Pat Donnelly
