= Anthony Cunningham =

Galway hurler

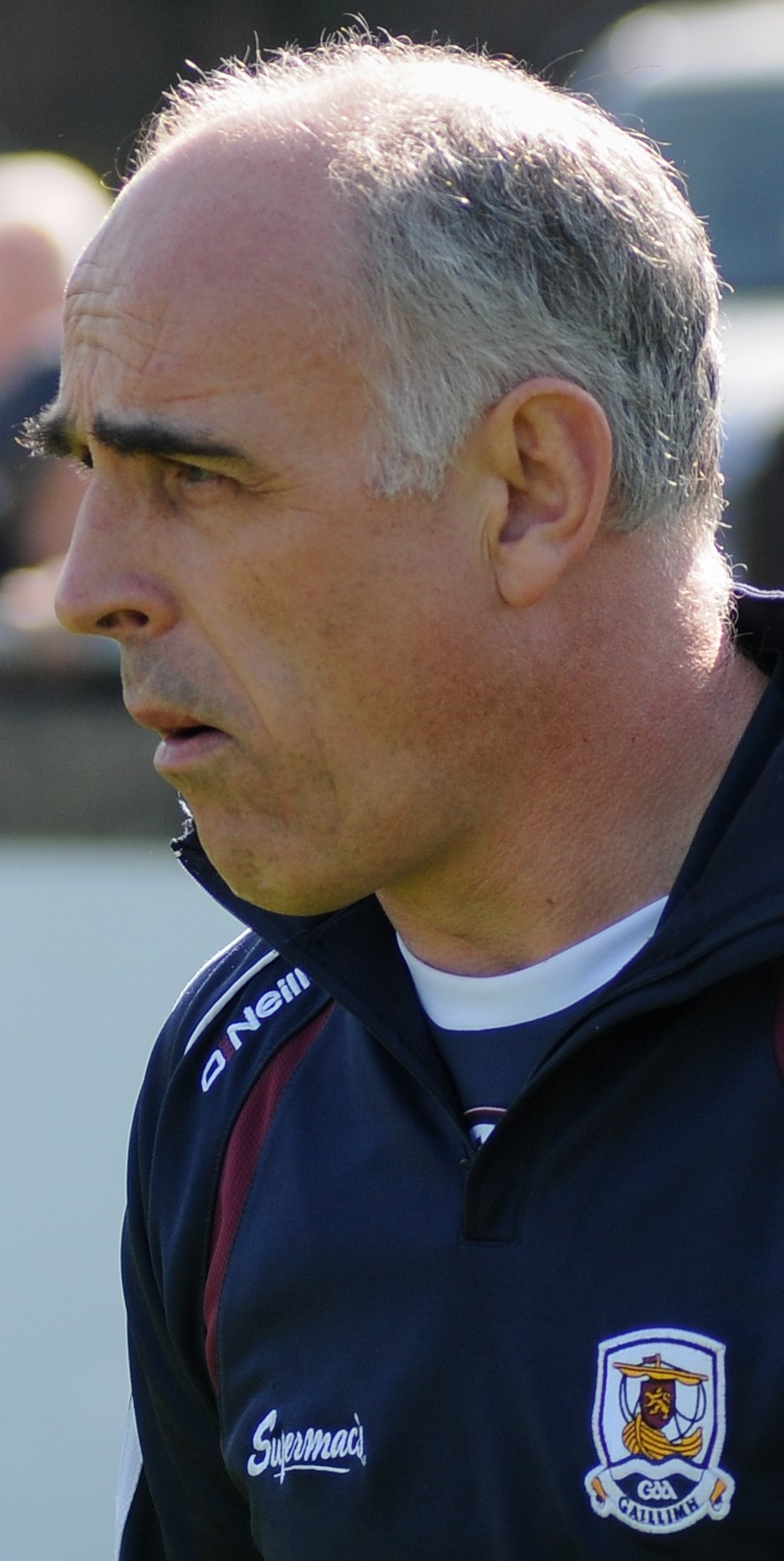

Personal information
- Native name: Antaine Ó Cuinneagáin (Irish)
- Born: 16 June 1965 (age 61) Peterswell, County Galway, Ireland
- Occupation: Engineer
- Height: 5 ft 9 in (175 cm)

Sport
- Sport: Hurling
- Position: Right wing-forward
Club
- Years: Club
- St Thomas' GAA
Club titles
- Galway titles: 0
Inter-county*
Years	County	Apps (scores)
1984–1993	Galway	15 (3–19)
Inter-county titles
- All-Irelands: 2
- NHL: 1
- All Stars: 0
- *Inter County team apps and scores correct as of 21:40, 4 September 2015.

Anthony Cunningham (born 16 June 1965) is a former hurler who has since managed various Gaelic football and hurling teams. He was manager of the Galway county hurling team between 2011 and 2015 and of the Roscommon county football team between 2018 and 2022. He is the only manager to lead a football team and a hurling team to provincial titles in two different provinces.

Born in Peterswell, County Galway, Cunningham was raised in the south of the county. He was a two-time Connacht medallist at colleges level with Our Lady's College while also joining the St Thomas' senior club team. Cunningham made his debut on the inter-county scene at the age of fifteen when he first linked up with the Galway minor team. An All-Ireland-winning captain in this grade, he later captained Galway to an All-Ireland title with the under-21 team. Cunningham joined the senior panel during the 1983-84 league. He went on to play for Galway in attack during a successful era and won two All-Ireland medals and one National Hurling League medal. He was an All-Ireland runner-up on four occasions. As a member of the Connacht inter-provincial team, Cunningham won four Railway Cup medals between 1986 and 1991. During his inter-county career he made 15 championship appearances. Cunningham retired from inter-county hurling following the conclusion of the 1993 championship.

Acting as a coach of both hurling and Gaelic football, Cunningham's first position as manager of the Roscommon senior hurling team was an unsuccessful one. In 2006 he took charge of the St Brigid's football team, guiding them to back-to-back championship titles. Cunningham later guided Garrycastle to an All-Ireland appearance having already secured a Leinster title and three successive championship titles.

In 2009, Cunningham was back as an inter-county manager with the Galway under-21 hurling team. His tenure, which culminated in the winning of the All-Ireland title, led to Cunningham being appointed manager of the Galway senior team on 27 October 2011. He has since gone on to lead Galway to two All-Ireland final appearances and a Leinster title. He was manager of the Galway senior team from 2011 to 2015.

== Early life ==
Cunningham is from the Castleboy area of south Galway, a hurling stronghold where little Gaelic football was played. After college he worked for Ericsson in Athlone and undertakes research at university.

== Playing career ==
=== Minor and under-21 ===
Cunningham first came to prominence on the inter-county scene as a member of the Galway minor hurling team as a sixteen-year-old in 1981. He made his debut that year as Galway reached the All-Ireland final for the first time in eight years. Kilkenny were the opponents and went on to win the game by 1–20 to 3–9.

Galway were back in a second successive All-Ireland minor decider again in 1982 against Tipperary, who won 2–7 to 0–4.

In 1983 Cunningham was in his final year on the minor team when he was appointed captain. Galway reached a third consecutive All-Ireland decider, this time with Dublin providing the opposition. A 0–10 to 0–7 victory gave Cunningham an All-Ireland Minor Hurling Championship medal.

Cunningham subsequently joined the Galway under-21 hurling team. He was captain in his final year in 1986, when Galway defeated Wexford by 1–14 to 2–5.

=== Senior ===
Cunningham made his senior debut for Galway in a National Hurling League game against Tipperary in 1984 and immediately became a regular member of the starting fifteen. In spite of an indifferent league campaign during the 1984–85 season, Galway subsequently qualified for the All-Ireland final against Offaly. Cunningham came on as a substitute in a game Offaly won by 2–11 to 1–12.

In 1986 Galway qualified for a second successive All-Ireland decider, this time with Cunningham as a member of the starting fifteen against Cork. Four Cork goals helped the Rebel County to a 4–13 to 2–15 victory over Galway.

Cunningham had his first senior success with Galway in 1987 when he won a National League winners' medal, following a two-point defeat of Clare. Galway reached the All-Ireland for the third year in a row, against Kilkenny. A 1–12 to 0–9 victory gave Cunningham his first senior medal.

Galway reached a fourth successive All-Ireland final in 1988 and had the chance of becoming the first Galway team to retain the title. Tipperary provided the opposition and a 1–15 to 0–14 scoreline resulted in victory for Galway and a second All-Ireland medal for Cunningham.

Galway reached the decider again in 1990 but lost 5–15 to 2–21 in a close match.

Cunningham was an unused substitute when Galway lost to Kilkenny in the 1993 final.

=== Interprovincial ===
Cunningham also lined out with Connact in the interprovincial championship. He won his first Railway Cup medal in 1986 as Connacht defeated Munster by 3–11 to 0–11.

Connacht made it two-in-a-row in 1987, with Cunningham collecting a second Railway Cup medal following a 2–14 to 1–14 defeat of Leinster.

After defeat in 1988, Connacht returned to the final again the following year. A thrilling 4–16 to 3–17 defeat of Munster gave Cunningham a third Railway Cup medal.

No championship took place in 1990. However, Connacht were back in a sixth final in seven years in 1991 and Cunningham collected a fourth Railway Cup medal following a 1–13 to 0–12 defeat of Munster.

== Managerial career ==
=== Roscommon (hurling) ===
Cunningham took over as manager of the Roscommon county hurling team in 2004. He enjoyed little success in his first season with 'the Rossies' making little progress in the 'B' championship.

In 2005, Roscommon contested the newly established Christy Ring Cup. After losing three of their group stage games, Cunningham's side faced a relegation battle which they just about survived.

=== St Brigid's ===
After guiding the St Brigid's Under-21 football team to the championship title in 2005, Cunningham was appointed manager of the club's senior team in 2006. The pressure was on for Cunningham in his debut season, as St Brigid's were already the reigning county champions. A 1–7 to 1–5 defeat of St Faithleach's in the 2007 decider secured a second successive championship for St Brigid's. Cunningham's side later claimed the Connacht title following a one-point defeat of Corofin.

In 2007, Cunningham's side made it three county championships-in-a-row following another defeat of St Faithleach's.

Four-in-a-row proved beyond St Brigid's and Cunningham stepped down as manager in 2008.

Cunningham managed St Brigid's again in 2025 and led them to win the county and Connacht football championships before losing narrowly to Dingle in the All-Ireland Club final in January 2026.

=== Garrycastle ===
Following his successful stint with St Brigid's, Cunningham was appointed manager of the Garrycastle senior football team in early 2009. Once again success was immediate. In his debut season Cunningham guided Garrycastle to the county championship title following a 3–8 to 0–6 defeat of St. Loman's.

Cunningham guided Garrycastle to a second successive county championship in 2010 following a 2–9 to 1–8 defeat of Mullingar Shamrocks.

The success continued for Cunningham's side once again in 2011. A 1–9 to 0–9 defeat of Mullingar Shamrocks after a draw and a replay gave Garrycastle an historic third championship title in succession. Garrycastle later secured the Leinster title following a narrow 1–8 to 0–10 defeat of Dublin's St. Brigid's. After three years at the helm, Cunningham finally guided Garrycastle to the All-Ireland final. Crossmaglen Rangers were the opponents and a 0–15 to 1–12 draw was the result. In spite of leading by four points in the first game, Cunningham's side were comprehensively defeated by 2–19 to 1–7 in the replay.

=== Galway (hurling) ===
==== Under-21 ====
In March 2009, Cunningham was appointed manager of the Galway under-21 hurling team for a two-year term. After exiting the championship at the first hurdle in 2009, Cunningham guided Galway to the All-Ireland decider the following year. Tipperary were the opponents and went on to trounce Galway by 5–22 to 0–12.

In late 2010, Cunningham was re-appointed manager for a further two-year term. In third season Cunningham guided Galway to a second successive All-Ireland final, this time with Dublin providing the opposition. A 3–14 to 1–10 victory gave Galway their tenth All-Ireland title.

=== Senior ===
On 27 October 2011, Cunningham was appointed as the Galway senior hurling manager. In November 2011 Cunningham dropped one third of the team which featured against Waterford in the 2011 All-Ireland SHC quarter-final defeat from his 37-man training squad for the 2012 season.

In his first season as manager he guided Galway to win their first ever Leinster Hurling Championship against Kilkenny and all the way to the 2012 All-Ireland Senior Hurling Championship Final, in which Kilkenny defeated them after a replay.

2013 proved to be more difficult for Anthony Cunningham. He maintained Galway's top flight status in Division 1A of the Allianz Hurling League with wins over Kilkenny and Waterford and a draw against Cork. This was followed by a League semi-final defeat, in which Kilkenny easily defeated Galway on a scoreline of 1–24 to 1–17. However, questions were raised of Galway's over-reliance on Joe Canning for scores.

Galway opened their 2013 Championship campaign against hurling minnows Laois, where they won on a scoreline of 2–17 to 1–13. This was followed by a comprehensive defeat at the hands of Dublin in the Leinster Senior Hurling Championship Final. Following the defeat questions were raised over Anthony Cunningham's team selections over the year, most notably from former Galway hurler Sylvie Linnane, who raised questions over the inconsistent selection of the backs. Both Tony Óg Regan and Niall Donoghue, both of whom gained an All Star nomination for their performances the previous year, were not selected for the game against Dublin. As a result of the defeat, Galway were drawn against Clare in the All Ireland Quarter-final. Another disappointing defeat followed. Again, the selection of the team drew the attention of pundits, as a total of six changes were made from the previous outing.

Cunningham subsequently came under pressure as Galway senior hurling manager. However, on 3 November 2013 it was confirmed that Cunningham would continue as manager and bring on-board new members of his backroom team; former Galway hurler and All-Star, Eugene Cloonon, along with GMIT GAA officer Damien Curley.

Cunningham's three-year term ended when Galway were knocked out of the All-Ireland qualifiers by Tipperary on 5 July 2014 and he had to apply and be nominated when the position was thrown open again. Cunningham was eventually appointed for another two years in October 2014. He will be aided by a backroom team of Pat Malone, Damien Curley and Eugene Cloonan.

On 16 August 2015 Galway reached the 2015 All-Ireland Senior Hurling Championship Final after defeating Tipperary in the semi-final. Galway went on to lose the final on 6 September to Kilkenny by four points. It was confirmed on 28 September 2015, that Cunningham would remain in charge in 2016. In early October 2015, reports emerged that the Galway players had put forward a vote of no confidence in him with Cunningham stating that he was keen to remain in charge. GAA officials in Galway were seeking to appoint a mediator in a bid to resolve the dispute. On 16 November 2015 Cunningham stepped down as Galway hurling manager after many players voted to oust him as manager.

=== Roscommon (football) ===
On 9 November 2018, Cunningham was appointed manager of the Roscommon county football team on a two-year deal with an option of a third year. In June 2019, Cunningham created history by leading Roscommon to victory over Galway in the Connacht Senior Football Championship final. In doing so, Cunningham became the first manager to win provincial titles in both football and hurling, in different provinces.

His departure as Roscommon senior manager was confirmed in August 2022.

== Honours ==
=== Player ===
Galway

- All-Ireland Senior Hurling Championship (2): 1987, 1988
- National Hurling League (2): 1986-87, 1988-89
- All-Ireland Under-21 Hurling Championship (1): 1986 (c)
- All-Ireland Minor Hurling Championship (1): 1983

Achievements
Preceded by John Kennedy (Tipperary)	All-Ireland MHC winning captain 1983	Succeeded by Anthony O'Riordan (Limerick)
Preceded by Michael Scully (Tipperary)	All-Ireland Under-21 HC winning captain 1986	Succeeded by Gussie Ryan (Limerick)
Sporting positions
Preceded by Brian McDonnell	Roscommon Senior Hurling Manager; 2004–2005	Succeeded by Michael Conneely
Preceded by Vincent Mullins	Galway Under-21 Hurling Manager; 2009–2012	Succeeded by Johnny Kelly
Preceded by John McIntyre	Galway Senior Hurling Manager; 2011–2015	Succeeded by Micheál Donoghue
Preceded by Kevin McStay	Roscommon Senior Football Manager; 2018–2022	Succeeded by Davy Burke
