= Gus Ryan =

Irish hurler

Gussie Ryan
Personal information
- Native name: Agaistín Ó Riain (Irish)
- Nickname: Gussie
- Born: 1966 (age 59–60) Limerick, Ireland
- Occupation: Clerical officer

Sport
- Sport: Hurling
- Position: Left wing-forward
Club
- Years: Club
- Claughaun
Club titles
	Football	Hurling
Limerick titles	1	1
Inter-county*
Years	County	Apps (scores)
1988-1993	Limerick	5 (0-2)
Inter-county titles
- Munster titles: 0
- All-Irelands: 0
- NHL: 0
- All Stars: 0
- *Inter County team apps and scores correct as of 20:44, 26 August 2012.

Augustine Ryan (born 1966) is an Irish hurling manager and former player. At club level, he played with Claughaun and at inter-county level with the Limerick senior hurling team.

== Playing career ==
Ryan played hurling at all grades as a student at Limerick CBS. He was part of the school's senior team that lost to St Finbarr's College in the final of the Dr Harty Cup in 1984.

At club level, Ryan began his career as a dual player at juvenile and underage levels with Claughaun, winning Limerick U21AHC medals in 1984 and 1987. He was part of the Claughaun teams that claimed a SHC-SFC double in 1986.

At inter-county level, Ryan first played for Limerick as part of the minor team that beat Kilkenny to win the All-Ireland MHC title in 1984.He scored the fifth point in the replay which Limerick won in a low scoring game 2-05 to 2-04 .He progressed to the under-21 team and won consecutive Munster U21HC titles, before claiming an All-Ireland U21HC medal as team captain after a 2-15 to 3-06 win over Galway in the 1987 final. Ryan subsequently made a number of appearances for the senior team.

== Coaching career ==
In retirement from playing, Ryan became involved in team management and coaching at various levels with the Claughaun club.

== Honours ==
Claughaun

- Limerick Senior Hurling Championship: 1986
- Limerick Senior Football Championship: 1986
- Limerick Under-21 Hurling Championship: 1984, 1987

Limerick

- All-Ireland Under-21 Hurling Championship: 1987 (c)
- Munster Under-21 Hurling Championship: 1986, 1987 (c)
- All-Ireland Minor Hurling Championship: 1984
- Munster Minor Hurling Championship: 1984

Sporting positions
Preceded by Anthony O'Riordan	Limerick under-21 hurling team captain 1987	Succeeded by Leo O'Connor
Achievements
Preceded by Anthony Cunningham	All-Ireland Under-21 Hurling Final winning captain 1987	Succeeded by Christy Connery
