= Mike Nash =

Irish hurler

Personal information
- Native name: Mícheál de Nais (Irish)
- Born: 1965 (age 60–61) Limerick, Ireland
- Occupation: Garda Síochána
- Height: 6 ft 1 in (185 cm)

Sport
- Sport: Hurling
- Position: Full-back
Club
- Years: Club
- South Liberties
College
- Years: College
- Garda College
College titles
- Fitzgibbon titles: 0
Inter-county
- Years: County
- 1987-1998: Limerick
Inter-county titles
- Munster titles: 2
- All-Irelands: 0
- NHL: 1
- All Stars: 0

Michael Nash (born 1965) is an Irish retired hurler. At club level, he played with South Liberties and at inter-county level with the Limerick senior hurling team.

== Career ==
Nash played hurling at all grades as a secondary school student at Limerick CBS. At club level, he played hurling and Gaelic football with South Liberties. Nash won consecutive Limerick U21FC titles in 1985 and 1986.

At inter-county level, Nash joined the Limerick senior hurling team during the 1987–88 National League. He was on and off the team over the next few years but made a permanent return in 1993. Nash won Munster SHC medals in 1994 and 1996, however, Limerick faced subsequent All-Ireland final defeats by Offaly and Wexford respectively. He added a National Hurling League medal to his collection in 1997.

Performances at inter-county level for Limerick resulted in Nash being called up to the Munster inter-provincial team. He won a Railway Cup medals in 1995 after a one-point win over Ulster in the final.

== Personal life ==
His brother, Declan Nash, played alongside him during Limerick's Munster SHC successes in 1994 and 1996. His nephew, Anthony Nash, lined out in goal with the Cork senior hurling team and won four Munster SHC medals.

== Honours ==
South Liberties

- Limerick Under-21 Football Championship: 1985, 1986

Limerick

- Munster Senior Hurling Championship: 1994, 1996
- National Hurling League: 1997

Munster

- Railway Cup: 1995
