= 2000 Limerick Senior Hurling Championship =

Annual hurling competition season

- Dates: 23 June – 8 October 2000
- Teams: 16
- Sponsor: PMG Steel
- Champions: Patrickswell (17th title); Anthony Carmody (captain); P. J. O'Grady (manager)
- Runners-up: Doon; Gerdie McGrath (manager)
- Relegated: Pallasgreen

Tournament statistics
- Matches played: 38
- Goals scored: 96 (2.53 per match)
- Points scored: 943 (24.82 per match)
- Top scorer(s): T. J. Ryan (2–33); Paddy Coleman (1–36); Gary Kirby (0–39)

The 2000 Limerick Senior Hurling Championship was the 106th staging of the Limerick Senior Hurling Championship since its establishment by the Limerick County Board.

Ahane were the defending champions, however, they were defeated by Patrickswell at the semi-final stage. The championship ran from 23 June to 8 October 2000.

On 8 October 2000, Patrickswell won the championship after a 0–16 to 0–15 defeat of Doon in the final. It was their 17th championship title overall and their first title in three championship seasons.

T. J. Ryan, Paddy Coleman and Gary Kirby were the championship's top scorers.

== Team changes ==
=== To Championship ===
Promoted from the Limerick Intermediate Hurling Championship

- Murroe/Boher

=== From Championship ===
Relegated to the Limerick Intermediate Hurling Championship

- Bruff

== Group 1 ==
=== Group 1 table ===
Knockout stage Relegation stage

Team	Matches				Score			Pts
Team	Pld	W	D	L	For	Against	Diff	Pts
Patrickswell	3	3	0	0	65	37	28	6
Garryspillane	3	1	1	1	53	57	−4	3
Adare	3	1	0	2	55	63	−8	2
Murroe/Boher	3	0	1	2	40	56	−16	1

=== Group 1 results ===
24 June 2000 Round 1	Adare	2–08 – 0–19	Patrickswell	Bruff Grounds
	C Fitzgerald 0–4, E Fitzgerald 1–0, B Foley 0–2, D Sheehan 0–1.		G Kirby 0–7, P O'Grady 0–3, T O'Brien 0–2, P O'Reilly 0–2, E Geary 0–2, C Carey 0–1, A Carmody 0–1, D O'Grday 0–1.

25 June 2000 Round 1	Murroe/Boher	0–13 – 0–13	Garryspillane	St John's Park
	O O'Neill 0–9, J Butler 0–2, C Brouder 0–1.		TJ Ryan 0–5, F Carroll 0–4, C Hickey 0–1, M O'Donnell 0–1.

16 July 2000 Round 2	Patrickswell	2–16 – 1–09	Garryspillane	FitzGerald Park
	G Kirby 0–6, T O'Brien 1–2, B Geary 1–2, P O'Grady 0–5, B Foley 0–1.		C Hickey 1–1, Donie Ryan 0–4, TJ Ryan 0–2, R Sampson 0–1, F Carroll 0–1.

16 July 2000 Round 2	Adare	3–10 – 3–07	Murroe/Boher	FitzGerald Park
	S Fitzgibbon 2–1, C Fitzgerald 0–6, C Murphy 1–1, M Foley 0–2.		O O'Neill 2–6, D Brouder 1–0, P Tobin 0–1.

23 July 2000 Round 3	Garryspillane	5–13 – 1–19	Adare	Gaelic Grounds
	TJ Ryan 2–7, P Tobin 1–1, M O'Donnell 1–0, C Hickey 1–0, A Garvey 0–2, David Ryan 0–1, R Sampson 0–1, M Walsh 0–1.		C Fitzgerald 0–8, S Fitzgibbon 1–3, C Murphy 0–2, M Foley 0–2, D Sheehan 0–1, A O'Rahilly 0–1, S Lavin 0–1, B Foley 0–1.

23 July 2000 Round 3	Patrickswell	1–21 – 0–11	Murroe/Boher	Bruff Grounds
	P O'Grady 1–3, G Kirby 0–5, A Carmody 0–4, T O'Brien 0–3, B Foley 0–2, D O'Grady 0–2, E Geary 0–1, D Foley 0–1.		O O'Neill 0–3, K Tobin 0–2, P Tobin 0–2, P Walsh 0–1, W Walsh 0–1, C Brouder 0–1, J O'Connor 0–1.

== Group 2 ==
=== Group 2 table ===
Knockout stage Relegation stage

Team	Matches				Score			Pts
Team	Pld	W	D	L	For	Against	Diff	Pts
Kilmallock	3	2	0	1	50	44	6	4
Bruree	3	2	0	1	52	32	20	4
Croom	3	2	0	1	49	35	14	4
Cappamore	3	0	0	3	28	68	−40	0

=== Group 2 results ===
23 June 2000 Round 1	Kilmallock	2–11 – 0–13	Croom	Bruff Grounds
	M Houlihan 1–7, P Connery 1–0, M Nelligan 0–2, P Tobin 0–1, C O'Dwyer 0–1.		K Cregan 0–6, P Cahill 0–2, H Flaviin 0–2, N O'Riordan 0–1, M Cahill 0–1, M O'Riordan 0–1.

24 June 2000 Round 1	Bruree	2–16 – 0–09	Cappamore	Childers Road

14 July 2000 Round 2	Kilmallock	5–09 – 2–06	Cappamore	Childers Road
	D Barry 2–2, C O'Dwyer 1–3, P Connery 1–1, B Carroll 1–0, M Nelligan 0–1.		L Hammersley 1–3, R Hammersley 1–0, T Mulcahy 0–1, D Coffey 0–1, D O'Donnell 0–1.

16 July 2000 Round 2	Croom	1–11 – 0–11	Bruree	Bruff Grounds
	J Cahill 1–1, P Keyes 0–3, M Cahill 0–2, P Cahill 0–1, K Cregan 0–1, M O'Riordan 0–1, P Lawlor 0–1.		R Fenton 0–6, J O'Brien 0–1, M Sexton 0–1, E Sexton 0–1.

23 July 2000 Round 3	Croom	0–22 – 1–04	Cappamore	Gaelic Grounds
	K Cregan 0–10, H Flavin 0–5, P Cahill 0–4, T Carmody 0–1, J Barry 0–1, J Cahill 0–1.		R Hammersley 1–1, L Hammersley 0–2, T Mulcahy 0–1.

23 July 2000 Round 3	Bruree	2–13 – 1–06	Kilmallock	Bruff Grounds
	J O'Brien 2–3, R Fenton 0–5, S O'Halloran 0–3, D O'Keeffe 0–1, M Sexton 0–1, A Frawley 0–1.		D Clarke 1–0, C O'Dwyer 0–2, P Tobin 0–1, D Barry 0–1, L Neenan 0–1, J Cronin 0–1.

=== Group 2 playoffs ===
29 July 2000 Playoff	Croom	2–12 – 2–12	Kilmallock	Bruff Grounds
	K Cregan 0–7, H Flavin 1–0, M Cahill 1–0, P Keyes 0–2, P Cahill 0–2, T Carmody 0–1.		D Clarke 0–8, P Connery 1–0, B Carroll 1–0, P Tobin 0–3, K O'Dwyer 0–1.

6 August 2000 Playoff replay	Croom	0–14 – 1–13	Kilmallock	Bruff Grounds
	J Cahill 0–4, K Cregan 0–3, P Cahill 0–2, M Cahill 0–2, P Lawlor 0–1, P Keyes 0–1, H Flavin 0–1.		D Clarke 0–6, P Tobiin 1–1, P Connery 0–3, J Fitzgerald 0–1, S Burchill 0–1, F Stapleton 0–1.

13 August 2000 Playoff	Bruree	4–08 – 0–16	Croom	Bruff Grounds
	S O'Connell 2–4, E Potter 1–0, D O'Keeffe 1–0, A Frawley 0–2, R Fenton 0–2.		K Cregan 0–9, P Cahill 0–2, M O'Riordan 0–1, S Lucey 0–1, H Flavin 0–1, J Cahill 0–1.

- Bruree and Kilmallock qualified for the quarter-finals.

== Group 3 ==
=== Group 3 table ===
Knockout stage Relegation stage

Team	Matches				Score			Pts
Team	Pld	W	D	L	For	Against	Diff	Pts
Ahane	3	2	1	0	56	39	32	5
Killeedy	3	1	2	0	47	45	2	4
Monaleen	3	1	1	1	40	48	−8	3
Pallasgreen	3	0	1	2	31	42	−9	1

=== Group 3 ===
25 June 2000 Round 1	Pallasgreen	0–09 – 1–11	Monaleen	FitzGerald Park
	M Kirby 0–5, J Hourigan 0–2, J Stokes 0–1.		S Mullane 0–5, M Gavin 1–0, P Moloney 0–3, J Cormican 0–2, G Larkin 0–1.

25 June 2000 Round 1	Ahane	0–17 – 2–13	Killeedy	FitzGerald Park
	T Herbert 0–7, J Moran 0–3, S O'Connor 0–2, N Moran 0–2, O Moran 0–2, N O'Sullivan 0–1.		D Flynn 1–5, P Cremin 0–4, J Kelleher 1–0, D Cremin 0–2, C Delee 0–1, G Kelly 0–1.

16 July 2000 Round 2	Ahane	1–22 – 1–09	Monaleen	Fr Hayes Memorial Park
	J Moran 1–5, T Herbert 0–6, N Moran 0–4, S O'Connor 0–3, O Moran 0–2, C O'Reilly 0–2.		S Mullane 0–7, D Smith 1–0, J O'Halloran 0–1, A Kitson 0–1.

16 July 2000 Round 2	Killeedy	1–11 – 1–11	Pallasgreen	Bruff Grounds
	D Flynn 0–5, R Hayes 1–0, D Cremin 0–2, P Cremin 0–1, J Kelleher 0–1, T Magner 0–1, J Magner 0–1.		A Shanahan 1–2, M Kirby 0–4, J Hourigan 0–2, R Cosgrave 0–2, J Deere 0–1.

23 July 2000 Round 3	Monaleen	0–14 – 1–11	Killeedy	Ballingarry Grounds
	S Mullane 0–5, P Moloney 0–4, M Gavin 0–2, D Cosgrave 0–1, J Cormican 0–1, P Farrell 0–1.		D Glynn 1–3, P Cremin 0–2, J Magner 0–1, G Kelly 0–1, R Hayes 0–1, T Magner 0–1, J Kelleher 0–1, T Kelleher 0–1.

23 July 2000 Round 3	Ahane	2–08 – 0–08	Pallasgreen	Cappamore Grounds
	J Meskell 1–2, S O'Connor 1–1, T Herbert 0–3, P Smith 0–2, J Moran 0–1.		M Kirby 0–8.

== Group 4 ==
=== Group 3 table ===
Knockout stage Relegation stage

Team	Matches				Score			Pts
Team	Pld	W	D	L	For	Against	Diff	Pts
Doon	3	3	0	0	59	41	18	6
Na Piarsaigh	3	2	0	1	42	33	9	4
Claughaun	3	1	0	2	44	54	−10	2
Ballybrown	3	0	0	3	35	52	−17	0

=== Group 4 results ===
25 June 2000 Round 1	Na Piarsaigh	0–13 – 0–07	Ballybrown	Gaelic Grounds
	D Quigley 0–5, E Kiely 0–4, D Hennessy 0–3, R Hennessy 0–1.		P McCarthy 0–3, L O'Gorman 0–1, S Kiely 0–1, C Coughlan 0–1, P Mulqueen 0–1.

25 June 2000 Round 1	Claughaun	0–13 – 5–10	Doon	Fr Hayes Memorial Park
	M Galligan 0–11, M Kerley 0–1, K Holmes 0–1.		G McGrath 1–2, P Coleman 1–2, L Ryan 1–1, J O'Donovan 1–0, D Stapleton 1–0, D Anderson 0–1, E Stapleton 0–1.

16 July 2000 Round 2	Na Piarsaigh	0–17 – 1–10	Claughaun	Gaelic Grounds
	E Kiely 0–5, D Hennessy 0–4, D Quigley 0–4, S O'Neill 0–2, J Cormack 0–1, C Minihan 0–1.		M Galligan 0–6, G Ryan 1–0, L O'Connor 0–2, K Holmes 0–2.

16 July 2000 Round 2	Ballybrown	1–13 – 1–18	Doon	FitzGerald Park
	L O'Gorman 1–7, P McCarthy 0–4, P Tiernan 0–2.		P Coleman 0–11, D Anderson 1–2, D Stapleton 0–2, G McGrath 0–1, E Stapleton 0–1.

23 July 2000 Round 3	Claughaun	2–12 – 1–09	Ballybrown	Gaelic Grounds
	M Galligan 0–8, G Ryan 1–1, A Kerley 1–0, I McNamara 0–1, L O'Connor 0–1.		C Coughlan 1–1, L O'Gorman 0–4, P Tiernan 0–2, P McCarthy 0–2.

23 July 2000 Round 3	Na Piarsaigh	1–09 – 0–13	Doon	FitzGerald Park
	D Quigley 1–3, S O'Neill 0–2, B Hartnett 0–1, F McNamara 0–1, D Hennessy 0–1, E Kiely 0–1.		P Coleman 0–4, E Stapleton 0–2, D Stapleton 0–2, D Anderson 0–2, T Hayes 0–1, C Ryan 0–1, G McGrath 0–1.

== Relegation stage ==
=== Relegation semi-finals ===
13 August 2000 Semi-final	Ballybrown	4–13 – 2–10	Pallasgreen	FitzGerald Park
	C Coughlan 2–1, P McCarthy 1–2, G Cross 1–0, P Hartigan 0–3, S Hayes 0–2, L O'Gorman 0–2, N Doolin 0–2.		R Cosgrave 1–4, P Cosgrave 1–1, M Kirby 0–3, J Deere 0–1, J Hourigan 0–1.

13 August 2000 Semi-final	Murroe/Boher	2–10 – 1–10	Cappamore	Fr Hayes Memorial Park

=== Relegation final ===
27 August 2000 Final	Pallasgreen	1–12 – 3–08	Cappamore	Fr Hayes Memorial Park
	M Kirby 0–6, P Cosgrave 1–0, J Hourigan 0–3, J Deere 0–2, A Kirby 0–1.		L Hammersley 2–1, L Cronin 1–0, G Sheehan 0–3, R Hammersley 0–2, P Ryan 0–1, D O'Donnell 0–1.

== Knockout stage ==
=== Quarter-finals ===
13 August 2000 Quarter-final	Garryspillane	2–17 – 3–13	Kilmallock
	TJ Ryan 0–10, M O'Donnell 1–1, F Carroll 1–0, A Garvey 0–2, D Ryan 0–1, M O'Dea 0–1, R Sampson 0–1.		M Houlihan 0–4, P Tobin 1–0, B Hanley 1–0, J Cronin 1–0, D Clarke 0–3, P Connery 0–2, A Maguire 0–1, J Fitzgerald 0–1, B Carroll 0–1, F Stapleton 0–1.

13 August 2000 Quarter-final	Doon	1–14 – 1–11	Killeedy	FitzGerald Park
	D Anderson 0–5, J O'Brien 1–0, D Stapleton 0–3, P Coleman 0–3, L Ryan 0–2, K Nolan 0–1.		D Flynn 0–8, J Magner 1–0, D Cremin 0–2, G Kelly 0–1.

13 August 2000 Quarter-final	Ahane	1–19 – 1–19	Na Piarsaigh	Gaelic Grounds
	J Moran 1–2, O Moran 0–5, N Moran 0–4, S OO'Connor 0–3, T Herbert 0–3, J Meskell 0–2.		D Quigley 0–10, J Cormack 1–1, D Hennessy 0–3, S O'Neill 0–2, C Minihan 0–1, R Hennessy 0–1, S Laffan 0–1.	Referee: J Sexton (Bruree)

19 August 2000 Quarter-final replay	Ahane	1–17 – 0–05	Na Piarsaigh	Gaelic Grounds
	T Herbert 0–5, N Moran 0–4, J Meskell 1–0, S O'Connor 0–3, O Moran 0–2, J Moran 0–2, C O'Reilly 0–1.		S O'Neill 0–2, D Quigley 0–2, S Laffan 0–1.	Referee: J Sexton (Bruree)

20 August 2000 Quarter-final	Patrickswell	4–14 – 0–14	Bruree	Bruff Grounds
	P O'Grady 1–4, G Kirby 0–6, E Geary 1–2, D O'Grady 1–1, B Foley 1–0, P Carey 0–1.		S O'Connor 0–5, S McDonagh 0–4, S O'Hallroan 0–3, S Murphy 0–1, R Fenton 0–1.

=== Semi-finals ===
3 September 2000 Semi-final	Doon	1–16 – 1–14	Garryspillane	Gaelic Grounds
	P Coleman 0–10, G McGrath 1–0, D Stapleton 0–2, E Stapleton 0–1, L Ryan 0–1, D Anderson 0–1, F Kenny 0–1.		TJ Ryan 0–9, C Hickey 1–1, F Carroll 0–2, D Ryan 0–1, M O'Brien 0–1.	Referee: S Hannon (Kildimo)

3 September 2000 Semi-final	Patrickswell	2–12 – 0–11	Ahane	Gaelic Grounds
	B Foley 2–2, P O'Grady 0–3, G Kirby 0–3, E Geary 0–2, T O'Brien 0–1, A Carmody 0–1.		N Moran 0–3, T Herbert 0–2, S O'Connor 0–2, M Kelly 0–1, J Meskell 0–1, J Moran 0–1, P Smith 0–1.	Referee: J Sexton (Bruree)

=== Final ===
8 October 2000 Final	Patrickswell	0–16 – 0–15	Doon	Gaelic Grounds
	G Kirby 0–12, B Foley 0–2, D O'Grady, E Geery 0–1 each.		P Coleman 0–6, D Anderson 0–4, D Ryan, D Stapleton 0–2 each, M McKenna 0–1.

== Championship statistics ==
=== Top scorers ===
Rank	Player	Club	Tally	Total	Matches	Average
1	T. J. Ryan	Garryspillane	2–33	39	5	7.80
1	Paddy Coleman	Doon	1–36	39	6	6.50
1	Gary Kirby	Patrickswell	0–39	39	6	6.50
4	Keith Cregan	Croom	0–36	36	6	6.00
5	Don Flynn	Killeedy	2–21	27	4	6.75
5	Damien Quigley	Na Piarsaigh	1–24	27	4	6.75
