= 1988 Limerick Senior Hurling Championship =

Annual hurling competition season

- Dates: 1 July – 16 October 1988
- Teams: 16
- Champions: Patrickswell (11th title); Pa Foley (captain); Phil Bennis (manager)
- Runners-up: Cappamore; Ger Sheehan (captain); Tony Hickey (manager)

Tournament statistics
- Matches played: 16
- Goals scored: 60 (3.75 per match)
- Points scored: 310 (19.38 per match)
- Top scorer(s): Gary Kirby (2–30)

The 1988 Limerick Senior Hurling Championship was the 94th staging of the Limerick Senior Hurling Championship since its establishment by the Limerick County Board in 1887. The championship ran from 1 July to 16 October 1988.

Patrickswell entered the championship as the defending champions.

The final, a replay, was played on 16 October 1988 at the Gaelic Grounds in Limerick, between Patrickswell and Cappamore, in what was their second meeting in the final overall and a first final meeting in four years. Patrickswell won the match by 4–10 to 2–06 to claim their 11th championship title overall and a second title in succession.

Patrickswell's Gary Kirby was the championship's top scorer with 2–30.

== Results ==
=== First round ===
1 July 1988 First round	Garryspillane	1–08 – 0–10	Tournafulla	Knockaderry Grounds
	B Stapleton 0–5, B Burke 1–0, B Stapleton 0–1, W Burke 0–1, F Carroll 0–1.		D Sheehan 0–5, G Moroney 0–1, D Keating 0–1, M Larkin 0–1, W Hartnett 0–1, C Brouder 0–1.

1 July 1988 First round	Adare	5–05 – 2–06	Bruree	Bruff Grounds
	D Keane 2–0, M Benson 1–2, S Fitzgibbon 1–0, B Heffernan 1–0, M Alfred 0–2, D Marron 0–1.		G Mullane 2–1, D Daly 0–4, E Potter 0–1.

1 July 1988 First round	Newcastle West	3–14 – 2–13	Blackrock	Páirc na nGael
	M Sammon 1–2, J Danaher 0–5, T Kelly 1–0, D McMahon 1–0, D Cremin 0–3, J McMahon 0–2, P O'Connor 0–1, L Keane 0–1.		P Heffernan 1–8, P McCarthy 0–4, J Quilty 1–0, D O'Sullivan 0–1.

1 July 1988 First round	Doon	3–08 – 1–04	Ahane	Cappamore Grounds
	J Donovan 0–7, T McGrath 1–0, E Maher 1–0, J Ryan 1–0, N Maher 0–1.		V Callinan 1–0, G Mulcahy 0–3, T Byrnes 0–1.

2 July 1988 First round	Bruff	1–13 – 2–08	Kilmallock	Michael Fox Park
	M Reale 0–9, T Coleman 1–0, A Madden 0–1, P Reale 0–1, D Kiely 0–1, P Barrett 0–1.		P Kelly 1–6, P Tobin 1–0, M Nelligan 0–1, D Riordan 0–1.

2 July 1988 First round	Patrickswell	1–10 – 0–12	Ballybrown	Gaelic Grounds
	G Kirby 1–5, A Carmody 0–2, S Kirby 0–1, C Carey 0–1, F Nolan 0–1.		C Keyes 0–8, O O'Connor 0–2, C Coughlan 0–1, T Hall 0–1.

3 July 1988 First round	Claughaun	3–09 – 1–08	Killeedy	FitzGerald Park
	L O'Connor 1–5, M Galligan 1–2, D Boylan 1–0, P Loughran 0–2.		P Fitzmaurice 0–4, K Kelly 1–0, W Fitzmaurice 0–2, J O'Connor 0–1, G Forde 0–1.

3 July 1988 First round	Cappamore	3–08 – 1–10	South Liberties	Pallasgreen Grounds
	M Clarke 2–1, L O'Brien 0–5, M Lonergan 1–0, D Mulcahy 0–2.		B Finn 0–4, L Dooley 1–0, N Nash 0–2, M O'Connor 0–1, J Grimes 0–1, G Fitzgerald 0–1.

=== Quarter-finals ===
15 July 1988 Quarter-final	Patrickswell	3–18 – 1–13	Garryspillane	Bruff Grounds
	G Kirby 0–10, C Carey 2–2, S Foley 1–0, F Nolan 0–2, A Carmody 0–2, S Kirby 0–1, G Burke 0–1.		B Stapleton 0–9, K Walsh 1–1, R Sampson 0–2, E Stapleton 0–1.

16 July 1988 Quarter-final	Claughaun	2–06 – 2–05	Adare	Bruff Grounds
	L O'Connor 2–5, P Loughran 0–1.		M Benson 1–1, M Alfred 1–0, T Dunne 0–2, D Keane 0–1, B Heffernan 0–1.

23 July 1988 Quarter-final	Doon	4–06 – 1–14	Bruff	Gaelic Grounds
	G McGrath 2–0, J Donovan 0–6, K McGrath 1–0, E Maher 1–0.		M Reale 0–9, T Coleman 1–0, V Donovan 0–2, P Barrett 0–2, P Reale 0–1.

24 July 1988 Quarter-final	Cappamore	0–13 – 1–07	Newcastle West	FitzGerald Park
	L O'Brien 0–8, N Sheehan 0–2, P Creamer 0–1, A Murphy 0–1, M Clarke 0–1.		J Danaher 0–4, L Cremins 1–0, D Fleming 0–1, J McMahon 0–1, P O'Connor 0–1.

=== Semi-finals ===
14 August 1988 Semi-final	Cappamore	3–09 – 1–13	Claughaun	FitzGerald Park
	L O'Brien 1–7, M Lonergan 1–1, G Sheehan 1–0, N Sheehan 0–1.		L O'Connor 1–4, M Galligan 0–4, D Fitzgerald 0–2, M Ryan 0–1, M Rea 0–1, A Moloney 0–1.

29 August 1988 Semi-final	Patrickswell	2–13 – 2–06	Doon	Bruff Grounds
	F Nolan 2–1, G Kirby 0–6, C Carey 0–5, S Foley 0–1.		T McGrath 2–0, R Walsh 0–2, R Quigley 0–2, J Donovan 0–1, E Maher 0–1.

=== Final ===
11 September 1988 Final	Patrickswell	1–14 – 2–11	Cappamore	Gaelic Grounds
	G Kirby 0–7, S Foley 1–1, A Carmody 0–2, P Foley 0–1, S Kirby 0–1, S Carey 0–1, L Enright 0–1.		L O'Brien 2–4, N Sheehan 0–2, G Sheehan 0–2, J McCarthy 0–1, R Hammersley 0–1, M Lonergan 0–1.

=== Final replay ===
16 October 1988 Final replay	Patrickswell	4–10 – 2–06	Cappamore	Gaelic Grounds
	C Carey 1–2, G Kirby 1–2, F Nolan 1–1, S Foley 1–0, S Kirby 0–2, G Hayes 0–1, David Punch 0–1, Dom Punch 0–1.		J McCarthy 1–0, M Lonergan 1–0, R Hammersley 0–2, L O'Brien 0–2, D Mulcahy 0–1, J Hayes 0–1.

== Championship statistics ==
=== Top scorers ===
Overall

Rank	Player	Club	Tally	Total	Matches	Average
1	Gary Kirby	Patrickswell	2–30	36	5	7.20
2	Liam O'Brien	Cappamore	3–26	35	5	7.00
3	Leo O'Connor	Claughaun	4–14	26	3	8.66
4	Ciarán Carey	Patrickswell	3–10	19	5	3.80
5	Mike Reale	Bruff	0–18	18	2	9.00
6	Frankie Nolan	Patrickswell	3–05	14	5	2.80
6	Brian Stapelton	Garryspillane	0–14	14	2	7.00
6	James Donovan	Doon	0–14	14	3	4.66
9	Seán Foley	Patrickswell	3–02	11	5	2.20
9	Michael Lonergan	Cappamore	3–02	11	5	2.20
9	Pat Heffernan	Blackrock	1–08	11	1	11.00

Single game

Rank	Player	Club	Tally	Total	Opposition
1	Leo O'Connor	Claughaun	2–05	11	Adare
1	Pat Heffernan	Blackrock	1–08	11	Newcastle West
3	Liam O'Brien	Cappamore	2–04	10	Patrickswell
3	Liam O'Brien	Cappamore	1–07	10	Claughaun
3	Gary Kirby	Patrickswell	0–10	10	Garryspillane
6	Paddy Kelly	Kilmallock	1–06	9	Bruff
6	Mike Reale	Bruff	0–09	9	Kilmallock
6	Mike Reale	Bruff	0–09	9	Doon
6	Brian Stapelton	Garryspillane	0–09	9	Tournafulla
10	Ciarán Carey	Patrickswell	2–02	8	Garryspillane
10	Gary Kirby	Patrickswell	1–05	8	Ballybrown
10	Leo O'Connor	Claughaun	1–05	8	Killeedy
10	Christy Keyes	Ballybrown	0–08	8	Patrickswell
10	Liam O'Brien	Cappamore	0–08	8	Newcastle West
