= 1990–91 National Hurling League =

60th season of the National Hurling League

League details
- Dates: 14 October 1990 – 12 May 1991
- Teams: 32

League champions
- Winners: Offaly (1st win)
- Captain: Danny Owens
- Manager: Pádraig Horan

League runners-up
- Runners-up: Wexford
- Captain: Ted Morrissey
- Manager: Martin Quigley

Other division winners
- Division 2: Galway
- Division 3: Wicklow
- Division 4: Mayo

The 1990–91 National Hurling League was the 60th season of the National Hurling League, the top league for inter-county hurling teams, since its establishment in 1925. The season began on 14 October 1990 and concluded on 12 May 1991.

Kilkenny came into the season as defending champions of the 1989-90 season. Clare and Waterford entered Division 1 as the two promoted teams.

On 12 May 1991, Offaly won the title after a 2-6 to 0-10 win over Wexford. It was their first league title ever.

Dublin were the first team to be relegated after losing all of their group stage games, while Clare suffered the same fate.

== Division 1 ==
=== Table ===
Pos	Team	Pld	W	D	L	Pts	Notes
1	Wexford	7	6	0	1	12	National League runners-up
2	Tipperary	7	5	0	2	10	
3	Waterford	7	4	1	2	9	
4	Kilkenny	7	4	0	3	8	
5	Cork	7	3	1	3	7	
6	Limerick	7	3	0	4	6	
7	Clare	7	1	2	4	4	Relegated
8	Dublin	7	0	0	7	0	Relegated

=== Group stage ===
14 October 1990	Clare	1-13 - 0-16	Waterford	Cusack Park, Ennis
	V Donnellan 0-7, C Clancy 1-0, M McNamara 0-2, T Guilfoyle 0-2, M Daffy 0-1, P Minogue 0-1.		K Delahunty 0-8, L O'Connor 0-3, B O'Sullivan 0-1, B Greene 0-1, S Daly 0-1, M O'Keeffe 0-1, S Aherne 0-1.	Referee: P Horan (Kerry)

28 October 1990	Kilkenny	4-11 - 1-11	Dublin	Nowlan Park, Kilkenny
	A Prendergast 1-4, C Carter 1-4, E Morrissey 1-1, C Heffernan 1-1, P Ryan 0-1.		K Hetherton 0-9, S McDermott 1-0, B McMahon 0-1, S Dalton 0-1.

28 October 1990	Wexford	2-14 - 1-09	Limerick	Gorey
	J Holohan 1-3, S Wickham 1-2, M Storey 0-3, E Synnott 0-2, B Byrne 0-1, L O'Gorman 0-1, A Codd 0-1, D Guiney 0-1.		M Galligan 1-1, C Carey 0-2, M Holohan 0-1, J O'Connor 0-1, A Garvey 0-1, S Fitzgibbon 0-1, P Heffernan 0-1, A Carmody 0-1.	Referee: W Barrett (Tipperary)

28 October 1990	Tipperary	0-22 - 1-10	Clare	Semple Stadium, Thurles
	C Stakelum 0-7, P Fox 0-6, M Cleary 0-3, D Carr 0-3, C Bonnar 0-1, J Leahy 0-1, M O'Meara 0-1.		B Minogue 1-3, M McNamara 0-2, T Guilfoyle 0-1, C Chaplin 0-1, J O'Connell 0-1, C Lyons 0-1, C Clancy 0-1.	Referee: P Long (Kilkenny)

29 October 1990	Waterford	1-15 - 2-05	Cork	Fraher Field, Dungarvan
	K Delahunty 0-7, S Ahearne 1-0, N Crowley 0-2, M Walsh 0-1, P Murray 0-1, L O'Connor 0-1, B O'Sullivan 0-1, D Byrne 0-1, E Nolan 0-1.		G Fitzgerald 1-1, P Buckley 1-1, C Casey 0-2, T O'Sullivan 0-1.	Referee: D Murphy (Wexford)

3 November 1990	Cork	3-09 - 3-15	Wexford	Páirc Uí Chaoimh, Cork
	G Fitzgerald 1-1, K Hennessy 0-4, P Buckley 1-0, D Kiely 1-0, C Casey 0-2, B O'Sullivan 0-1, F Horgan 0-1.		J Holohan 1-7, B Byrne 1-1, E Synnott 1-1, M Storey 0-2, A Codd 0-2, S Wickham 0-1, D Guiney 0-1.	Referee: W Barrett (Tipperary)

4 November 1990	Dublin	2-06 - 2-22	Tipperary	Croke Park, Dublin
	S McDermott 2-1, K Hetherton 0-2, B McMahon 0-1, R Boland 0-1, G Regan 0-1.		M Cleary 0-9, D Ryan 1-2, C Stakelum 0-5, Cormac Bonnar 1-0, D Carr 0-3, P Fox 0-3.	Referee: P Dowling (Laois)

4 November 1990	Limerick	0-06 - 2-13	Waterford	Gaelic Grounds, Limerick
	L O'Connor 0-3, M Houlihan 0-2, C Carey 0-1.		K Delahunty 1-6, L O'Connor 1-1, B O'Sullivan 0-2, N Crowley 0-2, S Ahearne 0-1, E Nolan 0-1.	Referee: M Quinn (Clare)

4 November 1990	Clare	1-13 - 2-12	Kilkenny	Cusack Park, Ennis
	C Lyons 0-4, P Minogue 1-0, J O'Connell 0-2, T Guilfoyle 0-2, C Clancy 0-2, C Chaplin 0-1, M Daffy 0-1, F Tuohy 0-1.		A Prendergast 1-4, C Heffernan 1-1, E Morrissey 0-2, J Brennan 0-2, J Lawlor 0-1, C Carter 0-1, L McCarthy 0-1.	Referee: T Murray (Limerick)

11 November 1990	Cork	4-08 - 0-10	Kilkenny	Páirc Uí Chaoimh, Cork
	G Fitzgerald 2-0, K Hennessy 2-0, T O'Sullivan 0-2, C Casey 0-2, P Buckley 0-1, T McCarthy 0-1, B O'Sullivan 0-1, T Mulcahy 0-1.		A Prendergast 0-9, J Brennan 0-1.	Referee: W Barrett (Tipperary)

11 November 1990	Dublin	1-14 - 0-19	Wexford	Parnell Park, Dublin
	C Hetherton 0-8, S McDermott 1-1, D Kane 0-2, MJ Ryan 0-1, J Twomey 0-1, J Lyng 0-1.		J Holohan 0-9, M Morrissey 0-3, D Guiney 0-3, T Dempsey 0-3, E Sinnott 0-1.

18 November 1990	Waterford	1-15 - 1-09	Dublin	Walsh Park, Waterford
	N Crowley 0-6, B O'Sullivan 1-1, M Walsh 0-3, K Delahunty 0-3, S Ahearne 0-2.		K Hetherton 1-3, D Keane 0-2, S McDermott 0-1, R Boland 0-1, J Twomey 0-1, S Dalton 0-1.	Referee: W Barrett (Tipperary)

18 November 1990	Tipperary	3-13 - 0-13	Cork	Semple Stadium, Thurles
	Cormac Bonnar 2-1, P Fox 1-2, M Cleary 0-4, J Leahy 0-3, D Carr 0-2, G Williams 0-1.		T O'Sullivan 0-6, G Fitzgerald 0-2, L Forde 0-1, C McGuckin 0-1, T Mulcahy 0-1, K Hennessy 0-1, T McCarthy 0-1.	Referee: P Delaney (Laois)

18 November 1990	Kilkenny	0-07 - 3-15	Limerick	Nowlan Park, Kilkenny
	P Ryan 0-2, M Dunne 0-2, J Power 0-1, A Prendergast 0-1, J Brennan 0-1.		J O'Connor 2-0, G Kirby 0-6, P Heffernan 1-2, P Davoren 0-3, G Hegarty 0-2, M Galligan 0-2.	Referee: W Barrett (Tipperary)

18 November 1990	Wexford	1-09 - 0-10	Clare	O'Kennedy Park, New Ross
	J Holohan 1-3, M Morrissey 0-2, M Storey 0-2, L Dunne 0-1, E Synnott 0-1.		P Minogue 0-2, C Lyons 0-2, P O'Rourke 0-1, M McNamara 0-1, M Daffy 0-1, F Tuohy 0-1, D Shanahan 0-1, P Healy 0-1.

2 December 1990	Limerick	1-06 - 1-12	Tipperary	Gaelic Grounds, Limerick
	J O'Connor 1-0, G Kirby 0-2, P Heffernan 0-2, S Fitzgibbon 0-1, M Galligan 0-1.		P Fox 1-3, J Leahy 0-3, D Carr 0-2, M Cleary 0-2, G Williams 0-1, Conal Bonnar 0-1.	Referee: P Delaney (Laois)

17 February 1991	Cork	0-17 - 2-10	Dublin	Páirc Uí Chaoimh, Cork
	T O'Sullivan 0-8, K Hennessy 0-4, J O'Mahony 0-3, G Fitzgerald 0-1, T Mulcahy 0-1.		MJ Ryan 1-2, T O'Riordan 1-2, K Hetherton 0-3, S Dalton 0-1, B McMahon 0-1, J Twomey 0-1.	Referee: T Murray (Limerick)

17 February 1991	Tipperary	2-14 - 2-08	Waterford	Semple Stadium, Thurles
	N English 2-1, M Cleary 0-5, C Stakelum 0-4, D Carr 0-2, G Williams 0-1, Conal Bonnar 0-1.		E Cullinane 1-0, P Ryan 1-0, S Ahearne 0-3, B O'Sullivan 0-3, N Crowley 0-1, E Nolan 0-1.	Referee: P Horan (Offaly)

17 February 1991	Limerick	1-14 - 2-10	Clare	Gaelic Grounds, Limerick
	S Fitzgibbon 1-2, A Carmody 0-3, M Galligan 0-3, P Heffernan 0-2, G Hegarty 0-1, G Ryan 0-1, M Houlihgan 0-1, D Flynn 0-1.		F Tuohy 1-1, M Guilfoyle 1-1, C Lyons 0-4, M Daffy 0-2, V Donnellan 0-2.

17 February 1991	Kilkenny	1-21 - 2-12	Wexford	Nowlan Park, Kilkenny
	J Power 1-3, DJ Carey 0-4, A Prendergast 0-3, E Morrissey 0-3, R Heffernan 0-2, C Heffernan 0-2, L Ryan 0-2, B McGovern 0-1, R Power 0-1.		J Holohan 0-7, M Storey 1-2, E Synnott 1-1, B Byrne 0-1, A Codd 0-1.	Referee: W Horgan (Cork)

24 February 1991	Clare	0-13 - 1-10	Cork	Cusack Park, Ennis
	T Guilfoyle 0-4, M Guilfoyle 0-3, V Donnellan 0-3, C Lyons 0-2, P O'Rourke 0-1.		M Foley 1-0, T O'Sullivan 0-2, D Quirke 0-2, C Casey 0-2, K Hennessy 0-1, T McCarthy 0-1, S McCarthy 0-1, J Fitzgibbon 0-1.	Referee: P Delaney (Laois)

3 March 1991	Cork	2-11 - 1-12	Limerick	Páirc Uí Chaoimh, Cork
	G Fitzgerald 2-2, T McCarthy 0-3, C Casey 0-3, T O'Sullivan 0-1, J O'Mahony 0-1, K Hennessy 0-1.		M Galligan 1-2, C Carey 0-3, S Fitzgibbon 0-2, P Heffernan 0-2, G Ryan 0-1, G Hegarty 0-1, A Carmody 0-1.

3 March 1991	Waterford	1-12 - 1-10	Kilkenny	Walsh Park, Waterford
	K Delahunty 0-7, S Ahearne 1-1, B O'Sullivan 0-2, J Brenner 0-1, N Crowley 0-1.		R Heffernan 0-8, E Morrissey 1-1, J Power 0-1.	Referee: G Long (Tipperary)

3 March 1991	Wexford	1-11 - 1-10	Tipperary	Enniscorthy
	J Holohan 1-5, M Storey 0-4, E Synnott 0-1, S Wickham 0-1.		C Stakelum 1-3, J Hayes 0-2, D O'Connell 0-2, D Carr 0-1, D Ryan 0-1, P Fox 0-1.	Referee: JF Bailey (Dublin)

3 March 1991	Dublin	1-14 - 3-11	Clare	Croke Park, Dublin
	T O'Riordan 0-4, MJ Ryan 1-0, B McMahon 0-3, J Morris 0-3, S McDermott 0-2, S Dalton 0-1, K Hetherton 0-1.		C Lyons 0-8, M Guilfoyle 1-1, P Minogue 1-0, M Daffy 1-0, T Guilfoyle 0-1, F Tuohy 0-1.	Referee: P Lannigan (Kilkenny)

24 March 1991	Wexford	4-09 - 2-09	Waterford	Gorey
	J Holohan 1-2, S Wickham 1-1, B Byrne 1-0, E Sinnott 1-0, M Storey 0-3, D Prendergast 0-2, T Dempsey 0-1.		K Delahunty 1-5, B O'Sullivan 1-1, N Crowley 0-2, E Cullinane 0-1.	Referee: W Barrett (Tipperary)

24 March 1991	Tipperary	0-13 - 2-17	Kilkenny	Semple Stadium, Thurles
	C Stakelum 0-6, P Fox 0-3, J Hayes 0-2, D Carr 0-1, J Leahy 0-1.		DJ Carey 1-8, E Morrissey 1-2, J Power 0-3, P Ryan 0-1, J Brennan 0-1, A Ronan 0-1, L Fennelly 0-1.	Referee: W Horgan (Cork)

24 March 1991	Dublin	1-09 - 0-16	Limerick	Parnell Park, Dublin
	K Hetherton 1-3, S Moyles 0-2, MJ Ryan 0-2, P Tobin 0-1, T Costello 0-1.		P Heffernan 0-4, G Hegarty 0-3, C Carey 0-3, M Houlihan 0-2, S Fitzgibbon 0-2, John Fitzgibbon 0-1, P Howard 0-1.	Referee: P Long (Kilkenny)

=== Knock-out stage ===
Quarter-finals

14 April 1991 Quarter-final	Kilkenny	2-11 - 2-09	Galway	Semple Stadium, Thurles
	DJ Carey 2-5, C Heffernan 0-2, J Brennan 0-1, M Phelan 0-1, J Power 0-1, E Morrissey 0-1.		A Cunningham 1-0, J Rabbitte 1-0, E Burke 0-3, M Naughton 0-2, M McGrath 0-2, J Cooney 0-2.	Referee: T Murray (Limerick)

14 April 1991 Quarter-final	Offaly	3-14 - 0-14 (aet)	Waterford	Semple Stadium, Thurles
	J Kelly 2-1, M Corrigan 1-0, Johnny Dooley 0-4, Joe Dooley 0-2, D Owens 0-2, B Kelly 0-1, P Cleary 0-1, A Cahill 0-1, R Mannion 0-1, B Dooley 0-1.		N Crowley 0-3, K Delahunty 0-3, B O'Sullivan 0-3, D Byrne 0-2, J Brenner 0-1, S Aherne 0-1, E Cullinane 0-1.	Referee: P Delaney (Laois)

Semi-finals

28 April 1991 Semi-final	Offaly	1-07 - 0-07	Tipperary	Gaelic Grounds, Limerick
	M Duignan 1-1, D Owens 0-2, Johnny Dooley 0-2, Joe Dooley 0-1, D Regan 0-1.		J Leahy 0-3, M Cleary 0-3, M Ryan 0-1.	Referee: T Murray (Limerick)

28 April 1991 Semi-final	Wexford	2-12 - 2-12	Kilkenny	Croke Park, Dublin
	J Holohan 0-6, S Wickham 1-0, G O'Connor 1-0, D Prendergast 0-2, T Dempsey 0-2, M Storey 0-1, E Sinnott 0-1.		DJ Carey 0-6, E Morrissey 1-2, C Heffernan 1-0, J Power 0-2, P Ryan 0-1, P Dwyer 0-1.	Referee: W Horgan (Cork)

5 May 1991 Semi-final	Wexford	2-14 - 1-12	Kilkenny	Semple Stadium, Thurles
	J Holohan 1-7, E Sinnott 1-0, M Storey 0-3, B Byrne 0-1, G O'Connor 0-1, D Prendergast 0-1, T Dempsey 0-1.		E Morrissey 1-4, R Heffernan 0-5, M Phelan 0-1, A Ronan 0-1, L Ryan 0-1.	Referee: W Horgan (Cork)

Final

12 May 1991 Final	Offaly	2-06 - 0-10	Wexford	Croke Park, Dublin
	D Regan 2-0, M Duignan 0-3, R Mannion 0-1, D Owens 0-1, M Corrigan 0-1.		J Holohan 0-5, M Story 0-3, J Conran 0-2.	Attendance: 22,749; Referee: W Horgan (Cork)

=== Top scorers ===
Top scorers overall

Rank	Player	Team	Tally	Total	Matches	Average
1	Jimmy Holohan	Wexford	6-54	72	10	7.20
2	Kieran Delahunty	Waterford	2-39	45		
3	Kieran Hetherington	Dublin	2-29	35	7	5.00
4	Eamon Morrissey	Kilkenny	5-17	32		
5	D. J. Carey	Kilkenny	3-23	31	4	7.75
6	Conor Stakelum	Tipperary	1-25	28		
7	Anthony Prendergast	Kilkenny	2-21	27		
8	Martin Storey	Wexford	1-23	26		
8	Michael Cleary	Tipperary	0-26	26		
9	Ger FitzGerald	Cork	6-07	25		

Top scorers in a single game

Rank	Player	Team	Tally	Total	Opposition
1	D. J. Carey	Kilkenny	2-05	11	Galway
1	D. J. Carey	Kilkenny	1-08	11	Tipperary
2	Jimmy Holohan	Wexford	1-07	10	Cork
2	Jimmy Holohan	Wexford	1-07	10	Kilkenny
3	Kieran Delahunty	Waterford	1-06	9	Limerick
3	Kieran Hetherington	Dublin	0-09	9	Kilkenny
3	Michael Cleary	Tipperary	0-09	9	Dublin
3	Anthony Prendergast	Kilkenny	0-09	9	Cork
3	Jimmy Holohan	Wexford	0-09	9	Dublin
4	Ger FitzGerald	Cork	2-02	8	Limerick
4	Jimmy Holohan	Wexford	1-05	8	Tipperary
4	Kieran Delahunty	Waterford	1-05	8	Dublin
4	Kieran Delahunty	Waterford	0-08	8	Clare
4	Kieran Hetherington	Dublin	0-08	8	Wexford
4	Tony O'Sullivan	Cork	0-08	8	Dublin
4	Ray Heffernan	Kilkenny	0-08	8	Waterford
4	Cyril Lyons	Clare	0-08	8	Dublin

== Division 2 ==
=== Table ===
Pos	Team	Pld	W	D	L	Pts	Notes
1	Galway	7	7	0	0	14	
2	Down	7	5	0	2	10	
3	Offaly	7	5	0	2	10	National League champions
4	Kerry	7	3	0	4	6	
5	Antrim	7	3	0	4	6	
6	Laois	6	3	0	3	6	
7	Meath	7	1	0	6	2	Relegated
8	Derry	6	0	0	6	0	Relegated

=== Play-off ===
31 March 1991 Play-off	Offaly	3-13 - 1-7	Down	Drogheda Park, Drogheda
	D Owens 1-5, T Dooley 1-0, J Kelly 1-0, Johnny Dooley 0-2, A Cahill 0-2, Joe Dooley 0-1, M Duignan 0-1, J Pilkington 0-1, M Corrigan 0-1.		N Sands 1-3, G Blaney 1-0, G Coulter 0-1, C Mageean 0-1, K Fitzsimmons 0-1, M Blaney 0-1.	Referee: M Quinn (Clare)
