= 1994 Railway Cup Hurling Championship =

Irish hurling competition

- Dates: 6 February 1994 - 21 February 1994
- Teams: 4
- Champions: Connacht (9th title)
- Runners-up: Leinster

Tournament statistics
- Matches played: 3
- Goals scored: 5 (1.67 per match)
- Points scored: 65 (21.67 per match)
- Top scorer(s): Pat Potterton (2-05)

The 1994 Railway Cup Hurling Championship was the 66th staging of the Railway Cup since its establishment by the Gaelic Athletic Association in 1927. The cup began on 6 February 1994 and ended on 21 February 1994.

Leinster were the defending champions.

On 21 February 1994, Connacht won the cup after a 1–11 to 1–10 defeat of Leinster in the final at Semple Stadium. This was their 9th Railway Cup title overall and their first title since 1991.

== Results ==
=== Semi-finals ===
6 February 1994 Semi-final	Leinster	2-17 - 0-08	Ulster	Nowlan Park, Kilkenny
	P Potterton 1-4, M Storey 0-5, E Morrissey 1-1, T Dempsey 0-3, DJ Carey 0-2, A Ronan 0-2.		J Carson 0-5, J Connolly 0-1, SP McKillop 0-1, G O'Kane 0-1.	Referee: P O'Connor (Limerick)

6 February 1994 Semi-final	Munster	0-09 - 1-10	Connacht	Dr. Daly Park, Tulla
	F Carroll 0-4, G Kirby 0-1, P Fox 0-1, C Casey 0-1, T Fives 0-1, M Cleary 0-1.		M Coleman 0-8, J Rabbitte 1-0, F Forde 0-1, M Headd 0-1.	Referee: A Mac Suibhne (Dublin)

=== Final ===
20 February 1994 Final	Connacht	1-11 - 1-10	Leinster	Semple Stadium, Thurles
	L Burke 0-5, L Turley 1-1, M Coleman 0-2, M Donoghue 0-1, B Keogh 0-1, F Forde 0-1.		T Dempsey 0-5, P Potteron 1-1, DJ Carey 0-2, J Dooley 0-1, L O'Gorman 0-1.	Referee: G Harrington (Cork)

== Bibliography ==
- Donegan, Des, The Complete Handbook of Gaelic Games (DBA Publications Limited, 2005).
