= Kieran Delahunty =

Irish hurler

Personal information
- Native name: Ciarán Ó Dulchaointigh (Irish)
- Born: Waterford City

Sport
- Sport: Hurling
- Position: Centre-forward
Club
- Years: Club
- 1970s-1990s: Roanmore GAA
Inter-county
- Years: County
- 1980s-1990s: Waterford
Inter-county titles
- Munster titles: 0
- All-Irelands: 0
- All Stars: 0

Kieran Delahunty is an Irish hurler who formerly played with Roanmore GAA at club level and with Waterford GAA at inter-county level.

Kieran played at either centre or wing forward and was well known for his scoring ability. Kieran was Waterford's main free taker and was notable for his accuracy with the dead ball.

With Roanmore GAA, Kieran won two Waterford Senior Hurling Championships in 1989 and 1990.

== Honours ==
- Father of Kevin Delahunty
- Waterford Senior Hurling Championship winner - 1989 and 1990
- Munster Senior Hurling Championship runners-up - 1989
