= 1994 All-Ireland Senior Hurling Championship final =

1994 All-Ireland Senior Hurling Final
- Event: 1994 All-Ireland Senior Hurling Championship
Limerick	Offaly
2-13	3-16
- Date: 4 September 1994
- Venue: Croke Park, Dublin
- Man of the Match: Brian Whelahan
- Referee: Willie Barrett (Tipperary)
- Attendance: 54,458
- Weather: Dry

The 1994 All-Ireland Senior Hurling Championship Final was the 107th All-Ireland Final and the culmination of the 1994 All-Ireland Senior Hurling Championship, an inter-county hurling tournament for the top teams in Ireland. The match was held at Croke Park, Dublin, on 4 September 1994, between Limerick and Offaly.

The Munster champions lost to their Leinster opponents on a score line of 3-16 to 2-13. The match is known as 'the five-minute final' due to the sensational comeback by Offaly who scored 2-5 to win the game in the last five minutes.

== Summary ==
With five minutes of normal time remaining, Limerick were leading by 2-13 to 1-11 and looked to be heading to their first title in 21 years when Offaly were awarded a free 20 metres from the goal. Limerick goalkeeper Joe Quaid later admitted that he was to blame for the resultant goal in that he didn't organise his defence well enough to stop a low-struck free from Johnny Dooley. Quaid was erroneously blamed for Offaly's second goal after what was described as a quick and errant puck-out leading to Pat O'Connor putting Offaly a point ahead with a low shot to the net. Quaid later described the puck-out: "I didn’t rush back to the goals. I went back and picked up the ball, walked behind the goals like I normally would. Hegarty was out in the middle of the field on his own. I dropped the ball into his hand 70 yards out from goal. He caught the ball and in contact the ball squirted out of his hands." Because the television coverage was still showing a replay of the first goal, very few people got to see the build up to the second and when live transmission was resumed, the sliotar was still dropping towards Pat O'Connor leading people to assume that Quaid rushed his puck-out. Limerick went on to lose the game by 3-16 to 2-13.

== Match details ==
1994-09-04
15:30 UTC+1
Final

Limerick	2-13 – 3-16	Offaly
D. Quigley (2-3), G. Kirby (0-6), C. Carey (0-2), M. Houlihan (0-1), L. O'Connor (0-1).		Johnny Dooley (1-4), Joe Dooley (1-2), B. Dooley (0-5), P. O'Connor (1-0), J. Pilkington (0-2), J. Troy (0-1), D. Pilkington (0-1), M. Duignan (0-1).

Croke Park, Dublin
Attendance: 54,458
Referee: W. Barrett (Tipperary)

Limerick	Offaly

== Legacy ==
In 2012, The Guardian's Barry Glendenning (who is from Offaly) listed it as one of six "late sporting dramas", alongside events from The Ashes and the Winter Olympic Games.
