= 1995 Railway Cup Hurling Championship =

Irish hurling competition

- Dates: 5 February 1995 - 2 April 1995
- Teams: 4
- Champions: Munster (39th title); Gary Kirby (captain)
- Runners-up: Ulster

Tournament statistics
- Matches played: 3
- Goals scored: 10 (3.33 per match)
- Points scored: 83 (27.67 per match)
- Top scorer(s): Michael Cleary (0-17)

The 1995 Railway Cup Hurling Championship was the 67th staging of the Railway Cup since its establishment by the Gaelic Athletic Association in 1927. The cup began on 5 February 1995 and ended on 2 April 1995.

Connacht were the defending champions, however, they were defeated by Ulster in the semi-final.

On 2 April 1995, Munster won the cup after a 0-13 to 1–09 defeat of Ulster in the final at Croke Park. This was their 39th Railway Cup title overall and their first title since 1992.

== Results ==
=== Semi-finals ===
5 February 1995 Semi-final	Connacht	0-14 - 2-10	Ulster	Duggan Park, Ballinasloe
	L Burke 0-5, O Fahy 0-5, M McGrath 0-2, F Forde 0-1, P Kelly 0-1.		H Gilmore 1-4, N Sands 1-0, K Coulter 0-3, O Collins 0-2, P Jennings 0-1.	Referee: S McMahon (Clare)

5 February 1995 Semi-final	Munster	2-25 - 5-12 (aet)	Leinster	Gaelic Grounds, Limerick
	M Cleary 0-9, G Kirby 1-5, J Brenner 1-0, D Quigley 0-3, K Murray 0-3, T Browne 0-2, M Houlihan 0-1, G O'Loughlin 0-1, P Flynn 0-1.		E Morrissey 4-2, P Potterton 1-0, J Dooley 0-3, M Storey 0-3, J Troy 0-1, DJ Carey 0-1, L Dunne 0-1, PJ Delaney 0-1.	Referee: J Cody (Galway)

=== Final ===
2 April 1995 Final	Munster	0-13 - 1-09	Ulster	Croke Park, Dublin
	M Cleary 0-8, D Nash 0-1, T Browne 0-1, K Murray 0-1, D Quigley 0-1, J O'Connor 0-1.		T McNaughton 1-1, O Collins 0-4, H Gilmore 0-2, P McKillen 0-1, G Savage 0-1.	Referee: P Horan (Offaly)

== Bibliography ==
- Donegan, Des, The Complete Handbook of Gaelic Games (DBA Publications Limited, 2005).
