= 1991–92 National Hurling League =

61st season of the National Hurling League

League details
- Dates: 20 October 1991 – 10 May 1992
- Teams: 32

League champions
- Winners: Limerick (10th win)

Other division winners
- Division 2: Antrim
- Division 3: Kildare

The 1991–92 National Hurling League was the 61st season of the National Hurling League, the top leagues for inter-county hurling teams, since its establishment in 1925. The fixtures were announced on 28 November 2006. The season began on 20 October 1991 and concluded on 10 May 1992.

== Division 1 ==
National Hurling League Division 1
- Season: 1991-92
- Champions: Limerick; 10th National League title Captain: Joe O'Connor; Manager: Phil Bennis
- Relegated: Laois
- Matches: 35
- Top goalscorer: Gary Kirby (4-38)
- Biggest home win: Tipperary 5-24 - 2-6 Down (1 March 1992)
- Biggest away win: Tipperary 2-17 - 1-7 Offaly (16 February 1992)
- Highest scoring: Tipperary 5-24 - 2-6 Down (1 March 1992)
- All statistics correct as of 10 February 2017.

The league saw a major restructuring of the usual four divisions of eight teams. Division 1 was split into Group 1A and Group 1B with each group consisting of six teams. The top two teams in each group qualified for the knock-out stage.

Offaly came into the season as defending champions of the 1990-91 season. Galway, Down, Laois and Offaly all entered Division 1 as part of the restructuring.

On 12 May 1992, Limerick won the title after a 0-14 to 0-13 win over Tipperary in the final. It was their 10th league title overall.

Laois were relegated from Division 1 after being defeated by Dublin in a relegation play-off.

Limerick's Gary Kirby was the Division 1 top scorer with 4-38.

=== Division 1A table ===
Pos	Team	Pld	W	D	L	Pts	Notes
1	Limerick	5	4	1	0	9	National League champions
2	Tipperary	5	3	1	1	7	National League runners-up
3	Kilkenny	5	3	0	2	6	
4	Down	5	2	0	3	4	
5	Offaly	5	1	1	3	3	
6	Laois	5	0	1	4	1	Relegated to Division 2

=== Group stage ===
20 October 1991	Kilkenny	2-19 - 1-9	Laois	Nowlan Park, Kilkenny
	E Morrissey 1-8, J Power 1-2, L Fennelly 0-2, L McCarthy 0-2, D Gaffney 0-2, P Ryan 0-1, D Fennelly 0-1, P Brophy 0-1.		P Bergin 0-5, T Dunne 1-0, M O'Hara 0-2, J Fitzpatrick 0-1, S Plunkett 0-1.	Referee: T Murray (Limerick)

20 October 1991	Limerick	2-12 - 0-13	Tipperary	Gaelic Grounds, Limerick
	G Kirby 1-6, S Fitzgibbon 1-1, M Galligan 0-3, P Davoren 0-2.		C Stakelum 0-7, P Fox 0-2, D Ryan 0-1, D O'Connell 0-1, A Ryan 0-1, J O'Dwyer 0-1.	Referee: P Horan (Offaly)

20 October 1991	Offaly	2-12 - 2-17	Down	St. Brendan's Park, Birr
	Johnny Dooley 1-2, M Duignan 1-1, B Dooley 0-4, B Kelly 0-1, John Troy 0-1, J Pilkington 0-1, Joe Dooley 0-1, B Whelehan 0-1.		C Mageean 1-10, P Savage 1-1, M Blaney 0-3, M Baille 0-1, G Savage 0-1, K Coulter 0-1.	Referee: D Murphy (Wexford)

3 November 1991	Tipperary	2-18 - 1-11	Kilkenny	Semple Stadium, Thurles
	C Stakelum 0-7, P Fox 1-3, A Ryan 1-2, D O'Connell 0-3, D Ryan 0-3.		L McCarthy 0-4, L Fennelly 1-0, A Ronan 0-2, C Carter 0-2, P Phelan 0-1, P Ryan 0-1, M Phelan 0-1.	Referee: T Murray (Limerick)

3 November 1991	Laois	1-3 - 0-11	Offaly	Kelly Daly Park, Rathdowney
	C Dunphy 1-1, P Bergin 0-2.		Johnny Dooley 0-4, Joe Dooley 0-2, D Pilkington 0-3, S Brennan 0-1, P Connors 0-1.	Referee: W Horgan (Cork)

3 November 1991	Down	3-8 - 4-17	Limerick	John Mitchell Park, Ballygalget
	C Mageean 1-5, P McCrickard 1-0, N Sands 1-0, J McCarthy 0-1, G Savage 0-1, K Coulter 0-1.		G Kirby 3-4, M Galligan 0-5, C Carey 0-4, L Garvey 1-0, M Houlihan 0-1, M Reilly 0-1, F Carroll 0-1, G Hegarty 0-1.	Referee: P Delaney (Laois)

16 February 1992	Offaly	1-7 - 2-17	Tipperary	St. Brendan's Park, Birr
	Johnny Dooley 0-4, M Duignan 1-0, Joe Dooley 0-1, B Dooley 0-1, B Kelly 0-1.		D Ryan 1-3, M Cleary 0-6, C Stakelum 0-5, N English 1-1, J Leahy 0-2.	Referee: J Moore (Waterford)

16 February 1992	Limerick	1-18 - 0-7	Kilkenny	Gaelic Grounds, Limerick
	G Kirby 0-5, L Garvey 1-0, M Galligan 0-3, A Garvey 0-2, M Houlihan 0-2, S Fitzgibbon 0-2, P Heffernan 0-1, G Hegarty 0-1, F Carroll 0-1, A Carmody 0-1.		E Morrissey 0-4, J Power 0-2, M Phelan 0-1.	Referee: M Quinn (Clare)

16 February 1992	Down	3-7 - 2-9	Laois	McKenna Park, Ballycran
	Philbin Savage 2-1, M Baille 1-1, C Mageean 0-2, N Sands 0-2, D Hughes 0-1.		J Fitzpatrick 1-2, G Norton 1-1, P Bergin 0-4, J Dollard 0-1, S Dooley 0-1.	Referee: T O'Dowd (Westmeath)

1 March 1992	Kilkenny	0-12 - 0-10	Offaly	Nowlan Park, Kilkenny
	A Ronan 0-5, J Power 0-2, M Phelan 0-2, M Morrissey 0-1, D Gaffney 0-1, P Hoban 0-1.		Johnny Dooley 0-5, Joe Dooley 0-2, J Rigney 0-1, D Owens 0-1, M Conneally 0-1.	Referee: J O'Leary (Cork)

1 March 1992	Laois	1-7 - 0-11	Limerick	Kelly Daly Park, Rathdowney
	P Bergin 0-5, J Fitzpatrick 1-0, J Dollard 0-1, G Norton 0-1.		G Kirby 0-7, S Fitzgibbon 0-2, L Garvey 0-1, G Hegarty 0-1.	Referee: M Darcy (Galway)

1 March 1992	Tipperary	5-24 - 2-6	Down	Semple Stadium, Thurles
	N English 2-4, D Ryan 2-2, J Leahy 1-5, M Cleary 0-6, C Stakelum 0-3, B Ryan 0-2, J Hayes 0-1, D Carr 0-1.		C Mageean 0-4, B Coulter 1-0, N Sands 1-0, P McCrickard 0-1, D Hughes 0-1.

22 March 1992	Down	2-10 - 3-14	Kilkenny	McKenna Park, Ballycran
	C Mageean 1-4, P Savage 1-1, N Sands 0-2, P McCrickard 0-1, J McCarthy 0-1, B Coulter 0-1.		DJ Carey 1-5, D Gaffney 1-4, P Hoban 1-2, M Phelan 0-1, P Brophy 0-1, E Morrissey 0-1.	Referee: G McClory (Antrim)

22 March 1992	Laois	2-10 - 2-10	Tipperary	Kelly Daly Park, Rathdowney
	PJ Cuddy 1-0, J Bates 1-0, P Bergin 0-4, D Conroy 0-3, D Rooney 0-1, N Delaney 0-1, C Dunphy 0-1.		J Leahy 2-1, M CLeary 0-5, C Stakelum 0-2, P Fox 0-1, A Ryan 0-1.	Referee: S McMahon (Clare)

22 March 1992	Offaly	2-13 - 1-16	Limerick	St. Brendan's Park, Birr
	Johnny Dooley 1-11, J Kelly 1-0, M Duignan 0-1, B Dooley 0-1.		G Kirby 0-7, T Kenny 1-1, M Galligan 0-4, G Hegarty 0-2, S Carroll 0-2.	Referee: J McDonald (Tipperary)

=== Division 1B table ===
Pos	Team	Pld	W	D	L	Pts	Notes
1	Galway	5	4	0	1	8	
2	Cork	5	3	0	2	6	
3	Waterford	5	3	0	2	6	
4	Clare	5	2	0	3	4	
5	Wexford	5	2	0	3	4	
6	Dublin	5	1	0	4	2	

=== Group stage ===
20 October 1991	Wexford	3-14 - 1-12	Clare	O'Kennedy Park, New Ross
	B Byrne 2-2, J O'Connor 1-3, T Dempsey 0-3, M Storey 0-3, G O'Connor 0-1, M Foley 0-1, D Prendergast 0-1.		C Lyons 0-8, M Guilfoyle 1-1, C Clancy 0-1, M McNamara 0-1, F Tuohy 0-1.	Referee: W Barrett (Tipperary)

20 October 1991	Galway	0-17 - 0-14	Waterford	Ballinasloe
	M McGrath 0-6, E Burke 0-3, J Cooney 0-3, R Doane 0-3, M Coleman 0-1, M Naughten 0-1.		K Delahunty 0-8, J Brenner 0-3, M O'Keeffe 0-2, S Ahearne 0-1.	Referee: M Quinn (Clare)

20 October 1991	Cork	2-12 - 0-14	Dublin	Páirc Uí Chaoimh, Cork
	S McCarthy 0-7, K Hennessy 0-2, G Manley 0-1, K McGuckian 0-1, T McCarthy 0-1, L Kelly 0-1, B Corcoran 0-1.		S McDermott 1-2, S Kearns 1-1, J Twomey 0-4, D Finn 0-3, E Gormley 0-1, J Morris 0-1.	Referee: P Delaney (Laois)

3 November 1991	Dublin	1-15 - 2-15	Galway	Parnell Park, Dublin
	S McDermott 0-7, J Morris 1-1, J Twomey 0-3, S Morkam 0-1, S Kearns 0-1, D Finn 0-1, B McMahon 0-1.		E Burke 2-6, M McGrath 0-3, J Cooney 0-2, J Rabbitte 0-2, B Keogh 0-1, T Monaghan 0-1.	Referee: D Murphy (Wexford)

3 November 1991	Waterford	2-13 - 2-11	Wexford	Fraher Field, Dungarvan
	K Delahunty 0-9, L O'Connor 1-1, P Prendergast 1-0, D Byrne 0-1, J Brenner 0-1, B O'Sullivan 0-1.		T Dempsey 1-2, M Storey 1-0, L Dunne 0-3, B Byrne 0-2, M Foley 0-1, J O'Connor 0-1, D Prendergast 0-1, T Dunne 0-1.	Referee: K Walsh (Limerick)

3 November 1991	Clare	1-12 - 1-8	Cork	Cusack Park, Ennis
	M Daffy 0-5, C Lyons 0-4, S O'Loughlin 1-0, F Tuohy 0-1, M Guilfoyle 0-1, C Clancy 0-1.		G Manley 1-5, S McCarthy 0-2, T Mulcahy 0-1.	Referee: P Horan (Offaly)

16 February 1992	Galway	2-17 - 1-10	Wexford	Pearse Stadium, Galway
	E Burke 1-5, J Rabbitte 1-3, M McGrath 0-4, J Cooney 0-2, B Keogh 0-2, C Moran 0-1.		J Holohan 1-1, J O'Connor 0-4, E Synott 0-2, P O'Donoghue 0-1, L Dunne 0-1, T Dunne 0-1.	Referee: J McDonnell (Tipperary)

16 February 1992	Dublin	0-11 - 2-8	Clare	Parnell Park, Dublin
	K Hetherton 0-7, J Ryan 0-1, M Ryan 0-1, S Boland 0-1, E Gormley 0-1.		M Guilfoyle 1-0, J O'Connell 1-0, C Lyons 0-3, M Daffy 0-2, G O'Loughlin 0-1, J McInerney 0-1, T Guilfoyle 0-1.	Referee: P Aherne (Carlow)

16 February 1992	Cork	3-16 - 2-9	Waterford	Páirc Uí Chaoimh, Cork
	G Manley 1-6, P Buckley 0-4, C O'Donovan 1-0, J Fitzgibbon 1-0, B Corcoran 0-3, T Kelleher 0-1, B Egan 0-1, C Casey 0-1.		K Delahunty 1-4, J Meaney 1-1, J Brenner 0-3, L O'Connor 0-1.	Referee: D Murphy (Wexford)

1 March 1992	Wexford	1-10 - 3-13	Cork	Páirc Uí Chaoimh, Cork
	T Dempsey 1-1, J Holohan 0-4, G Cody 0-3, R Guiney 0-1, E Sinnott 0-1.		P Buckley 2-4, C Casey 1-7, G Fitzgerald 0-1, T Mulcahy 0-1.	Referee: W Barrett (Tipperary)

1 March 1992	Clare	0-10 - 2-14	Galway	Cusack Park, Ennis
	C Lyons 0-3, M Daffy 0-3, M Guilfoyle 0-2, F Tuohy 0-1, J O'Connell 0-1.		E Burke 2-2, C Moran 0-4, M Coleman 0-2, J Rabbitte 0-2, M McGrath 0-2, R Duane 0-1, J Cooney 0-1.	Referee: T Murray (Limerick)

1 March 1992	Waterford	2-16 - 2-4	Dublin	Walsh Park, Waterford
	K Delahunty 0-8, J Meaney 1-3, S Ahearn 1-1, N Crowley 0-3, B O'Sullivan 0-1.		B McMahon 1-0, S Boland 1-0, K Hetherton 0-3, J Twomey 0-1.

22 March 1992	Cork	0-12 - 0-8	Galway	Páirc Uí Chaoimh, Cork
	G Manley 0-5, K Hennessy 0-2, B O'Sullivan 0-2, C Casey 0-1, T Kelleher 0-1, S McCarthy 0-1.		J Cooney 0-2, R Duane 0-1, E Burke 0-1, M McGrath 0-1, P Hardiman 0-1, A Donoghue 0-1, T Keady 0-1.	Referee: T Lyons (Limerick)

22 March 1992	Clare	0-11 - 2-6	Waterford	Cusack Park, Ennis
	C Lyons 0-7, M Daffy 0-3, G O'Loughlin 0-1.		L O'Connor 1-2, J Meaney 1-0, K Delahunty 0-2, B O'Sullivan 0-1, S Ahearne 0-1.	Referee: J Cody (Galway)

22 March 1992	Dublin	0-13 - 1-12	Wexford	Parnell Park, Dublin
	MJ Ryan 0-8, J Twomey 0-2, J Morris 0-1, A Kelly 0-1, B McMahon 0-1.		M Storey 1-3, J Holohan 0-3, G Cody 0-2, T Dempsey 0-2, D Prendergast 0-2.	Referee: S O'Meara (Offaly)

=== Knock-out stage ===
Play-off

29 March 1992 Play-off	Cork	3-12 - 2-10	Waterford	Semple Stadium, Thurles
	J Fitzgibbon 1-2, T Mulachy 1-0, K Hennessy 1-0, S McCarthy 0-3, G Manley 0-3, G Fitzgerald 0-2, T McCarthy 0-1, T O'Sullivan 0-1.		J Meaney 1-2, B O'Sullivan 1-2, L O'Connor 0-2, P Prendergast 0-2, B Prendergast 0-1, S Aherne 0-1.	Referee: P Horan (Offaly)

Relegation play-off

12 April 1992 Play-off	Dublin	2-7 - 1-9	Laois	Geraldine Park, Athy
	MJ Ryan 1-5, E Gormley 1-0, S Boland 0-1, B McMahon 0-1.		P Bergin 0-6, PJ Cuddy 1-1, D Conroy 0-1, C Dunphy 0-1.	Attendance: 1,000; Referee: J O'Leary (Cork)

Semi-final

19 April 1992 Semi-final	Tipperary	1-15 - 1-8	Galway	Cusack Park, Ennis
	M Cleary 1-7, P Fox 0-4, A Ryan 0-2, C Stakelum 0-1, J Hayes 0-1.		E Burke 0-4, J Rabbitte 1-0, J Cooney 0-3, M McGrath 0-1.	Attendance: 20,000; Referee: P Delaney (Laois)

26 April 1992 Semi-final	Limerick	2-11 - 1-4	Cork	Gaelic Grounds, Limerick
	G Kirby 0-5, G Hegarty 1-0, J O'Connor 1-0, M Galligan 0-2, A Carmody 0-1, S Fitzgibbon 0-1, A Garvey 0-1, M Reale 0-1.		G Fitzgerald 1-0, G Manley 0-2, T Mulcahy 0-1, B Corcoran 0-1.	Attendance: 30,000; Referee: D Murphy (Wexford)

Final

10 May 1992 Final	Limerick	0-14 - 0-13	Tipperary	Gaelic Grounds, Limerick
	G Kirby 0-4, C Carey 0-2, G Hegarty 0-2, M Houlihan 0-1, M Reale 0-1, J O'Connor 0-1, R Sampson 0-1, S Fitzgibbon 0-1, L Garvey 0-1.		M Cleary 0-4, C Stakelum 0-3, P Fox 0-3, N English 0-2, D Carr 0-1.	Attendance: 30,236; Referee: D Murphy (Wexford)

=== Scoring statistics ===
Top scorers overall

Rank	Player	Team	Tally	Total	Matches	Average
1	Gary Kirby	Limerick	4-38	50	7	7.14
2	Eamonn Burke	Galway	5-21	36	5	7.20
3	Chris Mageean	Down	3-25	34	5	6.80
3	Kieran Delahunty	Waterford	1-31	34	5	6.80
5	Johnny Dooley	Offaly	2-26	32	5	6.40
6	Michael Cleary	Tipperary	1-28	31	5	6.20
7	Ger Manley	Cork	2-22	28	7	4.00
7	Conor Stakelum	Tipperary	0-28	28	7	4.00
9	Paul Bergin	Laois	0-26	26	6	4.33
10	Cyril Lyons	Clare	0-25	25	5	5.00

Top scorers in a single game

Rank	Player	Team	Tally	Total	Opposition
1	Johnny Dooley	Offaly	1-11	14	Limerick
2	Gary Kirby	Limerick	3-04	13	Down
2	Chris Mageean	Down	1-10	13	Offaly
4	Éamonn Burke	Galway	2-06	12	Dublin
5	Eamon Morrissey	Kilkenny	1-08	11	Laois
6	Pat Buckley	Cork	2-04	10	Wexford
6	Nicky English	Tipperary	2-04	10	Down
6	Cathal Casey	Cork	1-07	10	Wexford
6	Michael Cleary	Tipperary	1-07	10	Galway
10	Gary Kirby	Limerick	1-06	9	Tipperary
10	Ger Manley	Cork	1-06	9	Waterford
10	Kieran Delahunty	Waterford	0-09	9	Wexford

== Division 2 ==
National Hurling League Division 2
- Season: 1991-92
- Champions: Antrim
- Relegated: Roscommon
- Matches: 29
- All statistics correct as of 11 February 2017.

Division 2 remained as a single division consisting of eight teams. The first-placed team at the end of the group stage were deemed champions and secured promotion to Division 1.

Carlow, Roscommon, Westmeath and Wicklow all entered Division 2 as part of the restructuring.

On 12 April 1992, Antrim secured the title and promotion after a 3-8 to 0-11 win over Meath in round 7 of the group stage.

Roscommon were relegated from Division 2 after being defeated by Wicklow in a relegation play-off.

=== Division 2 table ===
Pos	Team	Pld	W	D	L	Diff	Pts	Notes
1	Antrim	7	7	0	0	79	14	Division 2 champions
2	Meath	7	4	2	1	19	10	
3	Carlow	7	4	1	2	2	9	
4	Westmeath	7	4	0	3	13	8	
5	Derry	7	3	0	4	-6	6	
6	Kerry	7	2	1	4	-11	5	
7	Wicklow	7	1	0	6	-45	2	
8	Roscommon	7	1	0	6	-54	2	Relegated to Division 3

=== Relegation play-off ===
17 May 1992 Play-off	Roscommon	0-15 - 1-9	Wicklow	O'Moore Park, Portlaoise

== Division 3 ==
National Hurling League Division 3
- Season: 1991-92
- Champions: Kildare
- Matches: 31
- All statistics correct as of 11 February 2017.

Division 3 was split into Group 3A and Group 3B with each group consisting of six teams. The first-placed team in each group contested a play-off to decide promotion.

On 13 April 1992, Kildare won the title after a 0-9 to 0-7 win over Monaghan in the play-off.

=== Division 3A table ===
Pos	Team	Pld	W	D	L	Pts	Notes
1	Kildare	5	5	0	0	10	Division 3 champions
2	Armagh	5	3	1	1	7	
3	Fermanagh	5	3	1	1	7	
4	Sligo	5	2	0	3	4	
5	Leitrim	5	1	0	4	2	
6	Cavan	5	0	0	5	0	

=== Division 3B table ===
Pos	Team	Pld	W	D	L	Pts	Notes
1	Monaghan	5	5	0	0	10	Division 3 runners-up
2	Mayo	5	4	0	1	8	
3	Louth	5	2	0	3	4	
4	Tyrone	5	2	0	3	4	
5	Longford	5	1	1	3	3	
6	Donegal	5	0	1	4	1	

=== Play-off ===
13 April 1992 Play-off	Kildare	0-9 - 0-7	Monaghan	St. Loman's Park, Trim
