= 1987 All-Ireland Under-21 Hurling Championship =

All-Ireland Under-21 Hurling Championship 1987
Championship Details
- Dates: 12 April 1987 - 21 June 1987

All Ireland Champions
- Winners: Limerick (1st win)
- Captain: Gus Ryan
- Manager: Phil Bennis

All Ireland Runners-up
- Runners-up: Galway
- Captain: Michael Connolly
- Manager: Pádraic Fahy

Provincial Champions
- Munster: Limerick
- Leinster: Wexford
- Ulster: Down
- Connacht: Not Played

Championship Statistics
- Top Scorer: Gary Kirby (1-24)

The 1987 All-Ireland Under-21 Hurling Championship was the 24th staging of the All-Ireland Under-21 Hurling Championship since its establishment by the Gaelic Athletic Association in 1964. The championship began on 12 April 1987 and ended on 21 June 1987.

Galway entered the championship as the defending champions.

On 21 June 1987, Limerick won the championship following a 2–15 to 3–06 defeat of Galway in the All-Ireland final. This was their first All-Ireland title.

Limerick's Gary Kirby was the championship's top scorer with 1-24.

== Results ==
=== Leinster Under-21 Hurling Championship ===
Quarter-finals

12 April 1987 Quarter-final	Kilkenny	5-05 - 2-04	Laois	Dr. Cullen Park, Carlow
	P McEvoy 3-2, M Phelan 1-0, M O'Neill 1-0, J Power 0-1, L Dowling 0-1, E Morrissey 0-1.		P Bergin 1-0, P Dollard 1-0, B Maher 0-1, S Cuddy 0-1, E Cox 0-1, T Fitzpatrick 0-1.	Referee: N O'Donoghue (Dublin)

Semi-finals

26 April 1987 Semi-final	Wexford	1-12 - 1-07	Kilkenny	Dr. Cullen Park, Carlow
	V Murphy 0-6, P Carton 1-2, D Prendergast 0-2, P O'Callaghan 0-1, M Morrissey 0-1.		P McEvoy 0-4, M O'Neill 1-0, E Morrissey 0-2, M Phelan 0-1.	Referee: N O'Donoghue (Dublin)

26 April 1987 Semi-final	Westmeath	0-03 - 2-10	Offaly	Cusack Park, Mullingar
	S Kilcoyne 0-1, J Fleming 0-1, L Giles 0-1.		D Hughes 0-7, J Rigney 1-2, M Duignan 1-0, F Dolan 0-1.

Final

10 May 1987 Final	Wexford	4-11 - 0-05	Offaly	Nowlan Park, Kilkenny
	M Morrissey 2-1, V Murphy 0-7, F O'Leary 1-1, P Carton 1-0, J Bolger 0-2.		D Hughes 0-2, J Rigney 0-1, K Dooley 0-1, F Nolan 0-1.

=== Munster Under-21 Hurling Championship ===
Quarter-finals

22 April 1987 Quarter-final	Waterford	0-06 - 2-15	Limerick	Fraher Field, Dungarvan
	M Ferncombe 0-3, B Lawton 0-2, L O'Connor 0-1.		L O'Connor 1-5, G Kirby 0-5, B Stapleton 1-0, P Barrett 0-2, G Ryan 0-1, A Carmody 0-1, J O'Connor 0-1.

Semi-finals

22 April 1987 Semi-final	Cork	1-15 - 2-05	Clare	FitzGerald Park, Kilmallock
	M Mullins 0-9, M Foley 1-1, J Fitzgibbon 0-2, B Harte 0-1, S McCarthy 0-1, D O'Connell 0-1.		D McInerney 1-0, T McMahon 1-0, G O'Loughlin 0-3, S O'Donoghue 0-1, D Cooney 0-1.	Referee: G Long (Tipperary)

13 May 1987 Semi-final	Limerick	2-15 - 1-08	Tipperary	Bruff Sportsfield, Bruff
	G Kirby 0-6, A Carmody 0-5, P Barrett 1-0, B Stapleton 1-0, G Ryan 0-2, G Hegarty 0-1, J O'Connor 0-1.		M Nolan 1-5, T Leamy 0-2, M Cleary 0-1.

Final

27 May 1987 Final	Limerick	3-14 - 2-09	Cork	Bruff Sportsfield, Bruff
	G Kirby 0-10, P Barrett 2-0, M Reale 1-1, A Carmody 0-1, G Hegarty 0-1, B Stapleton 0-1.		M Foley 1-2, M O'Mahony 1-1, M Mullins 0-2, L Kelly 0-1, D Kenneally 0-1, J Fitzgibbon 0-1, S McCarthy 0-1.	Referee: W Barrett (Tipperary)

=== Ulster Under-21 Hurling Championship ===
Semi-finals

12 April 1987 Semi-final	Derry	2-07 - 0-09	Antrim	Lavey
	S Downey 1-5, S O'Neill 1-0, P Kealey 0-1, E Mullen 0-1.		C Murphy 0-5, P McKillen 0-2, D McKillop 0-1, F McAllister 0-1.	Referee: P Byers (Down)

12 April 1987 Semi-final	Down	w/o - scr.	Armagh	St. Patrick's Park, Portaferry
				Referee: J Hegarty (Antrim)

Final

26 April 1987 Final	Derry	2-09 - 3-12	Down	Lavey
	S Downey 1-7, S O'Neill 1-2.		M Blaney 2-4, R Coffey 0-4, L Mason 1-0, E Blaney 0-2, K Coulter 0-1, B Hughes 0-1.

=== All-Ireland Under-21 Hurling Championship ===
Semi-finals

17 May 1987 Semi-final	Galway	0-11 - 1-07	Wexford	O'Connor Park, Tullamore
	M Connolly 0-7, R Duane 0-2, E Burke 0-2.		V Murphy 0-6, S Wickham 1-0, E Sinnott 0-1.	Referee: T Murray (Limerick)

31 May 1987 Semi-final	Limerick	3-26 - 0-03	Down	Croke Park, Dublin
	J O'Connor 1-4, P Barrett 1-4, G Kirby 1-3, B Stapleton 0-5, A Carmody 0-3, G Hegarty 0-3, G Ryan 0-2, D Marron 0-1, A Madden 0-1.		R Coffey 0-2, M Egan 0-1.	Referee: JF Bailey (Dublin)

Final

21 June 1987 Final	Limerick	2-15 - 3-06	Galway	Cusack Park, Ennis
	L O'Connor 2-5, G Hegarty 0-5, A Carmody 0-4, J O'Connor 0-1.		D Cox 1-2, M Connolly 0-4, E Burke 1-0, R Duane 1-0.	Referee: P Long (Kilkenny)

== Championship statistics ==
=== Top scorers ===
Top scorers overall

Rank	Player	County	Tally	Total	Matches	Average
1	Gary Kirby	Limerick	1-24	27	5	5.40
2	Leo O'Connor	Limerick	3-10	19	5	3.80
2	Vinny Murphy	Wexford	0-19	19	3	6.33
4	Pat Barrett	Limerick	4-06	18	5	3.60
4	Séamus Downey	Derry	2-12	18	2	9.00
6	Pat McEvoy	Kilkenny	3-06	15	2	7.50
7	Anthony Carmody	Limerick	0-14	14	5	2.80
