= 1984 All-Ireland Minor Hurling Championship =

All-Ireland Minor Hurling Championship 1984
Championship Details
- Dates: 19 April 1984 - 16 September 1984
- Teams: 17

All Ireland Champions
- Winners: Limerick (3rd win)
- Captain: Anthony O'Riordan

All Ireland Runners-up
- Runners-up: Kilkenny
- Captain: Tommy Lennon

Provincial Champions
- Munster: Limerick
- Leinster: Kilkenny
- Ulster: Down
- Connacht: Not Played

The 1984 All-Ireland Minor Hurling Championship was the 54th staging of the All-Ireland Minor Hurling Championship since its establishment by the Gaelic Athletic Association in 1928. The championship began on 19 April 1984 and ended on 16 September 1984.

Galway entered the championship as the defending champions, however, they were beaten by Kilkenny in the All-Ireland semi-final.

On 16 September 1984, Limerick won the All-Ireland title following a 2-05 to 2-04 defeat of Kilkenny in the All-Ireland final replay. This was their third All-Ireland title overall and their first title since 1958.

== Results ==
=== Leinster Minor Hurling Championship ===
Quarter-finals

19 May 1984 Quarter-final	Dublin	4-10 - 0-09	Laois	O'Toole Park, Dublin

19 May 1984 Quarter-final	Wicklow	0-04 - 1-07	Wexford	Aughrim County Ground, Aughrim

19 May 1984 Quarter-final	Meath	2-02 - 3-04	Offaly	St. Loman's Park, Trim

19 May 1984 Quarter-final	Westmeath	1-01 - 3-09	Kilkenny	Cusack Park, Mullingar

Semi-finals

23 June 1984 Semi-final	Kilkenny	4-06 - 1-05	Offaly	Geraldine Park, Athy
	W Purcell 1-1, G Drennan 1-1, P McEvoy 1-0, J Qually 1-0, B Ayers 0-2, J Power 0-1, L Egan 0-1.		P Hogan 1-1, S Byrne 0-3, J Buckley 0-1.

27 June 1984 Semi-final	Wexford	4-08 - 1-08	Dublin	Geraldine Park, Athy
	E Sinnott 2-0, M Morrissey 1-2, J Murray 1-1, D Pender 0-2, V Murray 0-1, F O'Leary 0-1, M Byrne 0-1.		B McMahon 1-2, B Kelleher 0-2, B Farrell 0-2, P O'Connell 0-1, R O'Connor 0-1.	Referee: M Kelleher (Kildare)

Final

8 July 1984 Final	Kilkenny	2-10 - 1-11	Wexford	Croke Park, Dublin
	L Dowling 1-2, W Purcell 1-0, J Power 0-2, P McEvoy 0-2, G Drennan 0-2, T Mennon 0-1, L Egan 0-1,		J Murray 1-2, M Morrissey 0-3, J Neville 0-2, F O'Leary 0-2, N McDonald 0-1, E Sinnott 0-1.	Referee: M Kelleher (Kildare)

=== Munster Minor Hurling Championship ===
First round

19 April 1984 First round	Kerry	3-04 - 1-18	Cork	Hermitage Park, Lixnaw
	M Fitzgerald 1-1, G Murphy 1-0, T Quilter 1-0, M Conway 0-3.		T Collins 0-5, DJ Kiely 0-5, G McCarthy 1-1, S McCarthy 0-2, D Bowles 0-2, O Cavanagh 0-1, C Riordan 0-1, B Harte 0-1.	Referee: K Walsh (Limerick)

19 April 1984 First round	Clare	0-16 - 2-05	Waterford	Canon Hayes Park, Bansha
			D Lyons 1-1, R O'Brien 1-0, E Brophy 0-2, P Queally 0-1,

Semi-finals

2 May 1984 Semi-final	Limerick	4-11 - 3-12	Cork	Bruree
	P Davoren 2-1, J O'Neill 1-1, G Kirby 0-4, A Carmody 0-4, B Stapleton 1-0, G Ryan 0-1.		DJ Kiely 0-6, G McCarthy 1-2, D Daly 1-2, P Cahill 1-0, S McCarthy 0-1, B Harte 0-1.	Referee: G Long (Tipperary)

3 May 1984 Semi-final	Tipperary	4-08 - 0-06	Clare	Gaelic Grounds, Limerick
	T Leamy 3-2, W Carroll 1-1, M Fleming 0-2, R Quirke 0-1, J Ryan 0-1, J Pyne 0-1.		S O'Donoghue 0-2, E Healy 0-1, F Carrig 0-1, J Kennedy 0-1.	Referee: J Moore (Waterford)

Final

15 July 1984 Final	Tipperary	2-07 - 3-06	Limerick	Semple Stadium, Thurles
	T Leamy 1-3, A Rossiter 1-0, W Carroll 0-2, D Quirke 0-1, J Ryan 0-1.		B Davoren 1-0, B Stapleton 1-3, G Kirby 0-2, A Carmody 0-1.	Referee: M O'Flaherty (Cork)

=== All-Ireland Minor Hurling Championship ===
Semi-finals

5 August 1984 Semi-final	Limerick	2-17 - 2-06	Down	Croke Park, Dublin
	B Stapleton 1-3, G Kirbey 0-6, S O'Neill 1-1, G Ryan 0-3, A Carmody 0-2, M O'Brien 0-1, T Byrnes 0-1.		N Sands 1-1, L Donaldson 0-4, P Sands 1-0, M Blaney 0-1.	Referee: J Bailey (Dublin)

5 August 1984 Semi-final	Galway	2-09 - 2-10	Kilkenny	Semple Stadium, Thurles
	D Grealish 1-0, A Davoren 1-0, I Dervan 0-3, M Quigley 0-2, M Connolly 0-2, B Hurney 0-1, G Coyne 0-1.		P McEvoy 0-7, L Egan 1-1, B Cleere 1-0, J Power 0-1, G Drennan 0-1.	Referee: M Moore (Waterford)

Finals

2 September 1984 Final	Limerick	1-14 - 3-08	Kilkenny	Semple Stadium, Thurles
	B Stapleton 1-4, G Kirby 0-4, A Carmody 0-3, T Byrnes 0-1, J O'Neill 0-1, G Ryan 0-1.		P McEvoy 1-5, J Farrell 1-0, T Lennon 1-0, G Drennan 0-1, L Dowling 0-1, W Purcell 0-1.	Referee: F Murphy (Cork)

16 September 1984 Final replay	Limerick	2-05 - 2-04	Kilkenny	Semple Stadium, Thurles
	C Coughlan 1-0, P Davoren 1-0, G Kirby 0-2, M O'Brien 0-1, B Stapleton 0-1.		L Dowling 1-2, W Purcell 1-0, P McEvoy 0-1, T Lennon 0-1.	Referee: F Murphy (Cork)

== Championship statistics ==
=== Miscellaneous ===
- Limerick won the Munster Championship for the first time since 1963.
