= 1986 All-Ireland Under-21 Hurling Championship =

All-Ireland Under-21 Hurling Championship 1986
All Ireland Champions
- Winners: Galway (4th win)
- Captain: Anthony Cunningham
- Manager: Cyril Farrell

All Ireland Runners-up
- Runners-up: Wexford

Provincial Champions
- Munster: Limerick
- Leinster: Wexford
- Ulster: Derry
- Connacht: Galway

The 1986 All-Ireland Under-21 Hurling Championship was the 23rd staging of the All-Ireland Under-21 Hurling Championship since its establishment by the Gaelic Athletic Association in 1964.

Tipperary were the defending champions, however, they were beaten by Limerick in the Munster semi-final.

On 14 September 1986, Galway won the championship following a 0–14 to 2–5 defeat of Wexford in the All-Ireland final. This was their fourth All-Ireland title in the under-21 grade and their first in three championship seasons.

== Leinster Under-21 Hurling Championship ==
=== Leinster quarter-finals ===
12 June 1986 Quarter-final	Wexford	2-10 - 1-09	Kilkenny	Wexford Park
	R Murphy 1-2, D Pender 0-4, T Dempsey 1-0, P Bardon 0-2, M Foley 0-1, J Murray 0-1.		M Phelan 1-2, E Morrissey 0-5, J Power 0-1, S O'Mahony 0-1.

=== Leinster semi-finals ===
25 June 1986 Semi-final	Meath	0-05 - 0-11	Offaly	St Loman's Park
	K Murray 0-3, D White 0-1, R Kelly 0-1, M Dinnen 0-1.		S Byrne 0-4, F Dolan 0-2, V Teehan 0-2, M Conneely 0-1, PJ Martin 0-1, B Guinan 0-1.

25 June 1986 Semi-final	Wexford	3-14 - 2-04	Laois	Dr Cullen Park
	D Prendergast 0-10, T Dempsey 2-1, M Foley 1-1, R Murphy 0-1, P McGrath 0-1.		P Bergin 1-1, E Coss 1-1, P Bardon 0-1, W Ramsbottom 0-1.

=== Leinster final ===
20 July 1986 Final	Wexford	2-09 - 2-09	Offaly	Nowlan Park
	M Morrissey 1-2, R Murphy 1-0, D Prendergast 0-3, T Dempsey 0-2, L O'Gorman 0-1, E Sinnott 0-1.		M Conneely 2-0, T Teeehan 0-3, S Byrne 0-3, K Dooley 0-1, F Doolin 0-1, R Byrne 0-1.

=== Leinster final replay ===
29 July 1986 Final replay	Wexford	1-16 - 0-10	Offaly	Nowlan Park
	D Prendergast 0-6, M Morrissey 1-0, T Dempsey 0-3, M Foley 0-2, P Bardon 0-2, L O'Gorman 0-1, P Carton 0-1, R Murphy 0-1.		R Byrnes 0-3, S Byrne 0-2, M Conneely 0-1, M Hanley 0-1, D O'Regan 0-1, V Teehan 0-1, B Kelly 0-1.	Referee: P Long (Kilkenny)

== Munster Under-21 Hurling Championship ==
=== Munster quarter-finals ===
9 April 1986 Quarter-final	Waterford	0-06 - 0-14	Cork	Walsh Park
	D Byrne 0-5, D Lyons 0-1.		S McCarthy 0-7, T McCarthy 0-4, J O'Neill 0-1, P Buckley 0-1, E Cleary 0-1.	Referee: G Long (Tipperary)

9 April 1986 Quarter-final	Tipperary	2-13 - 0-09	Kerry	MacDonagh Park
	L Nolan 2-1, M Cunningham 0-4, M Cleary 0-3, A Cross 0-2, D Quinlan 0-1, A Ryan 0-1, P Delaney 0-1.		S Sheehan 0-4, D Randles 0-2, T Godley 0-2, T Rice 0-1.

=== Munster semi-finals ===
23 April 1986 Semi-final	Clare	2-13 - 1-11	Cork	FitzGerald Park
	S Cusack 0-8, E Healy 1-1, G O'Looughlin 0-2, T Guilfoyle 0-1, M Cahill 0-1.		J O'Neill 1-0, J Griffin 0-2, S McCarthy 0-2, P Buckley 0-2, E Kenneally 0-2, M Treacy 0-1, D Kenneally 0-1, P Cahill 0-1.	Referee: T Murray (Limerick)

23 April 1986 Semi-final	Tipperary	0-09 - 1-11	Limerick	Semple Stadium
	D Kealy 0-3, D Quinlan 0-2, M Cleary 0-2, M Cunningham 0-1, A Cross 0-1.		L Dooley 1-9, G Ryan 0-1, G Kirby 0-1.

=== Munster final ===
8 May 1986 Final	Limerick	3-09 - 3-09	Clare	Gaelic Grounds
	L Dooley 1-4, G Kirby 1-1, B Finn 1-0, P Barrett 0-1, P Reale 0-1, B Stapleton 0-1, D Mulcahy 0-1.		G O'Loughlin 1-2, S Cusack 0-5, T Guilfoyle 1-0, M Cahill 1-0, J O'Connell 0-2.	Referee: W Horgan (Cork)

=== Munster final replay ===
15 May 1986 Final replay	Clare	0-03 - 2-10	Limerick	Cusack Park
	T Guilfoyle 0-2, S Cusack 0-1.		G Kirby 0-5, D Mulcahy 1-1, P Reale 1-0, L Dooley 0-3, A Cunneen 0-1.	Referee: W Horgan (Cork)

== Ulster Under-21 Hurling Championship ==
=== Ulster final ===
28 June 1986 Final replay	Down	2-09 – 2-09	Derry	McKenna Park

=== Ulster final replay ===
13 July 1986 Final replay	Derry	3-09 – 1-02	Down	Kevin Lynch Park

== All-Ireland Under-21 Hurling Championship ==
=== All-Ireland semi-finals ===
16 August 1986 Semi-final	Galway	2-10 – 2-06	Limerick	Cusack Park
	J Coooney 1-3, D Jennings 1-0, P Nolan 0-3, A Cunningham 0-2, P Davoren 0-1, M Connolly 0-1.		L Dooley 0-4, R Sampson 1-0, D Mulcahy 1-0, A Carmody 0-1, G Kirby 0-1.

17 August 1986 Semi-final	Wexford	5-16 – 2-03	Derry	St Loman's Park
	P Carton 3-0, M Morrissey 1-2, V Murphy 0-4, T Dempsey 0-4, M Foley 1-0, D Pender 0-3, P Barden 0-1, E Synnott 0-1, J Murray 0-1.		H Downey 2-3.

=== All-Ireland final ===
14 September 1986 Final	Galway	1-14 – 2-05	Wexford	Semple Stadium
	J Cooney 0-4, J Commins 1-0, M Connolly 0-3, P Nolan 0-2, P Dervan 0-1, G McInerney 0-1, D Jennings 0-1, A Cunningham 0-1, A Davoren 0-1.		P Carton 1-1, M Morrissey 1-0, L Dempsey 0-2, P Barden 0-1, H Prendergast 0-1.

== Championship statistics ==
=== Miscellaneous ===
- Derry won the Ulster Championship for the first time in their history.
- Limerick won the Munster Championship for the first time in their history.
- The All-Ireland semi-final clash between Derry and Galway remains their only ever championship meeting.
