= 1987 All-Ireland Under-21 Hurling Championship final =

1987 All-Ireland Under-21 Hurling Championship Final
- Event: 1987 All-Ireland Under-21 Hurling Championship
Limerick	Galway
2-15	3-6
- Referee: Paschal Long (Kilkenny)

The 1987 All-Ireland Under-21 Hurling Championship final was a hurling match that was played to determine the winners of the 1987 All-Ireland Under-21 Hurling Championship, the 23rd season of the All-Ireland Under-21 Hurling Championship, a tournament organised by the Gaelic Athletic Association for the champion teams of the four provinces of Ireland. The final was contested by Limerick of Munster and Galway of Connacht, with Limerick winning by 2–15 to 3–6.
