= Paul Carey (hurler) =

Irish hurler (1978–2020)

Personal information
- Native name: Pól Ó Ciardha (Irish)
- Born: November 1978 Patrickswell, County Limerick, Ireland
- Died: 6 November 2020 (aged 41) Dubai, United Arab Emirates
- Occupation: Secondary school teacher

Sport
- Sport: Hurling
- Position: Midfield
Club
- Years: Club
- Patrickswell
Club titles
- Limerick titles: 4
Inter-county
Years	County	Apps (scores)
1998–2002	Limerick	0 (0–00)
Inter-county titles
- Munster titles: 0
- All-Irelands: 0
- NHL: 0
- All Stars: 0

Paul Carey (November 1978 – 6 November 2020) was an Irish hurler. At club level he lined out with Patrickswell and was also a member of the Limerick senior hurling team.

== Playing career ==
Carey first played hurling alongside his brothers, Ciarán and Pa, with the Patrickswell club. After success in the minor and under-21 grades, he subsequently joined the club's senior team and won a total of four Limerick County Championship medals, including one as captain of the team in 2003. At inter-county level, Carey lined out with the Limerick minor and under-21 teams, before making his first appearance for the senior team in a pre-season South-East League game in November 1998. It would be 2002 before he made his competitive debut in a National League game against Derry. In a brief inter-county career, Carey made just two league appearances for Limerick.

== Personal life ==
Carey was killed in a road traffic collision in Dubai on 6 November 2020, aged 41.

== Honours ==
Patrickswell

- Limerick Senior Hurling Championship (4): 1996, 1997, 2000, 2003
