= 1997 Limerick Senior Hurling Championship =

Annual hurling competition season

- Dates: 17 April – 21 September 1997
- Teams: 20
- Sponsor: PMG Steel
- Champions: Patrickswell (16th title); Pa Carey (captain); Phil Bennis (manager)
- Runners-up: Garryspillane; Brendan Bonnar (manager)
- Relegated: Blackrock

Tournament statistics
- Top scorer(s): Gary Kirby (7–61)

The 1997 Limerick Senior Hurling Championship was the 103rd staging of the Limerick Senior Hurling Championship since its establishment by the Limerick County Board in 1887. The draw for the group stage took place on 11 February 1997. The championship ran from 17 April to 21 September 1997.

Patrickswell entered the championship as the defending champions.

The final was played on 21 September 1997 at the Gaelic Grounds in Limerick, between Patrickswell and Garryspillane, in what was their first ever meeting in the final. Patrickswell won the match by 1–12 to 0–09 to claim their 16th championship title overall and a third title in succession.

Patrickswell's Gary Kirby was the championship's top scorer with 7–61.

== Team changes ==
=== To Championship ===
Promoted from the Limerick Intermediate Hurling Championship

- Garryspillane

=== From Championship ===
Relegated to the Limerick Intermediate Hurling Championship

- South Liberties

== Format change ==
There was an increase in the number of teams, with four divisional or amalgamation teams joining the 16 club teams. This meant that each of the four groups increased to five teams, with each team being guaranteed four games. Eastern Gaels featured players from Caherline, Kilteely-Dromkeen and Fedamore, while Southern Gaels was composed of players from Galbally, Glenroe and Hospital-Herbertstown. St David's was made up of players fromwest Limerick, while Dromard was another amalgamation.

== Group 1 ==
=== Group 1 table ===
Knockout stage

Team	Matches				Score			Pts
Team	Pld	W	D	L	For	Against	Diff	Pts
Patrickswell	4	4	0	0	90	57	33	8
Kilmallock	4	2	0	2	56	61	−5	4
Ahane	4	2	0	2	53	62	−9	4
Na Piarsaigh	4	2	0	2	79	68	−11	4
Bruree	4	0	0	4	56	86	−30	4

=== Group 1 results ===
20 April 1997 Round 1	Kilmallock	1–12 – 0–13	Na Piarsaigh	Gaelic Grounds
	B Hanley 1–0, M Houlihan 0–3, P Dowling 0–2, P Tobin 0–2, M Cronin 0–2, K O'Dwyer 0–1, S Barrett 0–1.		D Hennessy 0–5, J Cormack 0–4, D Quigley 0–2, S O'Neill 0–1, A Ryan 0–1.

20 April 1997 Round 1	Patrickswell	2–15 – 1–11	Ahane	FitzGerald Park
	G Kirby 0–9, K Carey 2–1, D O'Grady 0–4, N Carey 0–1.		J O'Grady 1–1, J Moran 0–3, J Mescall 0–3, M Fitzgerald 0–2, O Moran 0–1, T Herbert 0–1.

2 May 1997 Round 2	Ahane	1–12 – 0–06	Kilmallock	Gaelic Grounds
	M Fitzgerald 1–2, P Moran 0–2, P Smith 0–2, T Herbert 0–2, J Meskell 0–2, J Moran 0–1, J O'Grady 0–1.		K O'Dwyer 0–3, M Cronin 0–1, M Houlihan 0–1, P Tobin 0–1.

4 May 1997 Round 2	Patrickswell	4–16 – 1–05	Bruree	Bruff Grounds
	K Carey 2–2, G Kirby 1–5, E Geary 1–0, A Purcell 0–2, A Carmody 0–2, D O'Grady 0–2, N Carey 0–1, B Foley 0–1, P Carey 0–1.		S O'Connell 1–4, S Murphy 0–1.

22 June 1997 Round 3	Na Piarsaigh	1–19 – 0–10	Ahane	Bruff Grounds
	D Hennessy 1–3, S O'Neill 0–6, J Cormack 0–3, D Quigley 0–3, S Laffan 0–2, P Beary 0–1, B Hartnett 0–1.		J O'Grady 0–3, D O'Neill 0–2, J Mescall 0–2, O Moran 0–1, T Mescall 0–1, P Smith 0–1.

29 June 1997 Round 3	Kilmallock	1–18 – 1–11	Bruree	Gaelic Grounds
	L Neenan 1–12, M Cronin 0–2, P Tobin 0–2, S Fitzgerald 0–1, B Hanley 0–1.		E Potter 0–8 J Potter 1–0, J O'Brien 0–1, M Sexton 0–1, S McDonagh 0–1.

13 July 1997 Round 4	Patrickswell	2–13 – 3–05	Kilmallock	Gaelic Grounds
	G Kirby 2–7, B Foley 0–1, D O'Grady 0–1, A Purcell 0–1, J McDermott 0–1, K Carey 0–1, E Geary 0–1.		D Clarke 1–1, L Neenan 0–4, P Tobin 1–0, J Fitzgerald 1–0.

13 July 1997 Round 4	Na Piarsaigh	4–11 – 4–09	Bruree	Gaelic Grounds
	A Ryan 1–2, B Hartnett 1–2, S Laffan 1–1, C Bonnar 1–0, D Hennessy 0–3, S O'Neill 0–2, P Beary 0–1.		S Halloran 1–2, P Sexton 1–1, S O'Connell 0–4, E Potter 1–0, M Sexton 1–0, D McCarthy 0–1, S McDonagh 0–1.

20 July 1997 Round 5	Patrickswell	2–16 – 2–15	Na Piarsaigh	Gaelic Grounds
	G Kirby 2–12, N Carey 0–1, T O'Brien 0–1, A Carmody 0–1, D O'Grady 0–1.		B Hartnett 0–6, P Beary 1–2, S O'Neill 0–4, C Bonnar 1–0, D Hickey 0–1, E Moriarty 0–1, C Minihan 0–1.

20 July 1997 Round 5	Ahane	1–11 – 0–13	Bruree	Bruff Grounds
	M Fitzgerald 0–5, T Meskell 1–0, J Moran 0–3, J O'Grady 0–2, TJ Collins 0–1.		S O'Connell 0–9, S McDonagh 0–1, S Murphy 0–1, S O'Halloran 0–1, E Potter 0–1.

=== Group 1 playoffs ===
2 August 1997 Playoff	Ahane	1–15 – 0–06	Na Piarsaigh	Brufg Grounds
	M Fitzgerald 0–6, T Meskell 1–0, C Smith 0–2, T Herbert 0–2, J O'Grady 0–2, A Smith 0–1, TJ Collins 0–1, P Smith 0–1.		B Hartnett 0–5, P Beary 0–1.

8 August 1997 Playoff	Kilmallock	3–10 – 0–13	Ahane	Gaelic Grounds
	P Tobin 3–2, M Cronin 0–3, L Neenan 0–2, J Connery 0–2, D Clarke 0–1.		M Fitzgerald 0–5, J Meskell 0–2, T Meskell 0–2, G Mulcahy 0–1, P Smith 0–1, C Smith 0–1, N Smith 0–1.

- Kilmallock qualified for the quarter-finals.

== Group 2 ==
=== Group 2 table ===
Knockout stage

Team	Matches				Score			Pts
Team	Pld	W	D	L	For	Against	Diff	Pts
Killeedy	4	3	0	1	46	36	10	6
Doon	3	2	1	0	60	31	29	5

=== Group 2 results ===
20 April 1997 Round 1	Southern Gaels	2–06 – 2–15	Killeedy	Gaelic Grounds
	PJ Garvey 2–0, L Garvey 0–3, M Meade 0–1, K Begley 0–1, M O'Brien 0–1.		J Hayes 1–4, G Kelly 1–2, D Cremin 0–3, T Maguire 0–1, T Magner 0–1, J Magner 0–1, J O'Connor 0–1, R Hayes 0–1, K Kelly 0–1.

20 April 1997 Round 1	St David's	0–16 – 1–04	Dromard	Páirc Mhic Chárthaigh

4 May 1997 Round 2	Doon	4–20 – 0–08	Southern Gaels	Bruff Grounds
	G McGrath 1–4, D Ryan 1–4, P Coleman 0–6, B Treacy 1–1, J Stokes 1–1, D Anderson 0–4, K McGrath 0–1.		J Kiely 0–5, K Begley 0–1, D Coffey 0–1, L Garvey 0–1.

4 May 1997 Round 2	Killeedy	2–08 – 2–02	St David's	Páirc Mhic Chárthaigh
	J Hayes 1–2, R Hayes 1–0, J Magner 0–2, T Magner 0–1, K Kelly 0–1, D Cremin 0–1, J Kelleher 0–1.		C O'Brien 1–0, J Quaid 1–0, L Murphy 0–2.

8 June 1997 Round 3	Killeedy	w/o – scr.	Dromard	Páirc Mhic Chárthaigh

22 June 1997 Round 3	Doon	0–12 – 1–09	St David's	Gaelic Grounds
	J Donovan 0–5, D Anderson 0–3, D Ryan 0–2, J Stokes 0–1, K McGrath 0–1.		W Keane 1–2, L Murphy 0–4, J Haugh 0–1, P Quaid 0–1, M Doody 0–1.

13 July 1997 Round 4	Southern Gaels	v	St David's	FitzGerald Park

13 July 1997 Round 4	Killeedy	1–08 – 1–13	Doon	FitzGerald Park
	G Kelly 1–3, D Cremin 0–1, J O'Connor 0–1, J Hayes 0–1, J Magnier 0–1, R Hayes 0–1.		D Anderson 0–5, J Donovan 1–0, T Hayes 0–3, D Stapelton 0–2, D Ryan 0–2, G McGrath 0–1.

== Group 3 ==
=== Group 3 table ===
Knockout stage

Team	Matches				Score			Pts
Team	Pld	W	D	L	For	Against	Diff	Pts
Claughaun	4	3	1	0	57	43	14	7
Garryspillane	4	3	0	1	67	57	10	6
Bruff	4	2	0	2	56	60	−24	4
Old Christians	4	0	2	2	58	68	−10	2
Pallasgreen	4	0	1	3	51	61	−10	1

=== Group 3 results ===
17 April 1997 Round 1	Garryspillane	5–07 – 2–13	Old Christians	FitzGerald Park
	Donie Ryan 3–0, R English 1–1, J O'Keeffe 1–0, F Carroll 0–3, David Ryan 0–2, TJ Ryan 0–1.		P Howard 0–9, A Maher 1–1, J Power 1–0, G Hegarty 0–3.

20 April 1997 Round 1	Claughaun	0–13 – 0–10	Bruff	FitzGerald Park
	M Galligan 0–9, T McGarry 0–2, A Browne 0–1, D Holmes 0–1.		I Hogan 0–5, F O'Dwyer 0–3, S Hogan 0–1, M Reale 0–1.

4 May 1997 Round 2	Claughaun	0–06 – 0–06	Old Christians	Gaelic Grounds
	G Ryan 0–3, L O'Connor 0–2, M Ryan 0–1.		G Hegarty 0–3, T Phayer 0–1, P Foley 0–1, J Power 0–1.

4 May 1997 Round 2	Garryspillane	1–08 – 1–05	Pallasgreen	Fr Hayes Memorial Park
	F Carroll 1–0, TJ Ryan 0–3, P Tobin 0–2, M O'Dea 0–1, R Sampson 0–1, Donie Ryan 0–1.		C O'Brien 1–0, G O'Connor 0–2, J McMahon 0–2, G Gammell 0–1.

15 June 1997 Round 3	Bruff	3–13 – 3–06	Old Christians	Cappamore Grounds
	JA Moran 2–3, I Hogan 0–4, T Coleman 1–0, F O'Dwyer 0–2, M Reale 0–2, J Mulqueen 0–1, J Hogan 0–1.		P Howard 3–4, T Sheehan 0–1, J Brosnahan 0–1.

22 June 1997 Round 3	Pallasgreen	2–08 – 1–14	Claughaun	Fr Hayes Memorial Park
	P Cosgrave 2–0, N Gammell 0–6, M Kirby 0–1, J Carr 0–1.		M Galligan 1–9, J Ryan 0–2, L O'Connor 0–1, A Browne 0–1, A Fitzgerald 0–1.

13 July 1997 Round 4	Bruff	1–12 – 1–08	Pallasgreen	Gaelic Grounds
	I Hogan 0–4, J Hogan 1–0, JA Moran 0–3, T Coleman 0–2, A Burke 0–2, F O'Dwyer 0–1.		N Gammell 1–1, J Carr 0–3, P Cosgrave 0–2, G Gammell 0–1, M Kirby 0–1.

13 July 1997 Round 4	Claughaun	3–12 – 1–10	Garryspillane	Fr Hayes Memorial Park
	M Galligan 0–8, D Fitzgerald 1–1, L O'Connor 1–0, M Ryan 1–0, G Ryan 0–3.		F Carroll 0–7, R Sampson 1–0, David Ryan 0–1, Donie Ryan 0–1, J Murnane 0–1.

27 July 1997 Round 5	Old Christians	4–06 – 2–12	Pallasgreen	Fr Hayes Memorial Park

27 July 1997 Round 5	Garryspillane	2–15 – 0–09	Bruff	FitzGerald Park
	F Carroll 1–8, Donie Ryan 1–0, R Sampson 0–3, R English 0–2, David Ryan 0–1, TJ Ryan 0–1.		I Hogan 0–7, J Hogan 0–1, F O'Dwyer 0–1.

== Group 4 ==
=== Group 4 table ===
Knockout stage

Team	Matches				Score			Pts
Team	Pld	W	D	L	For	Against	Diff	Pts
Ballybrown	4	4	0	0	72	43	29	8
Adare	4	3	0	1	67	41	26	6
Eastern Gaels	4	2	0	2	46	52	−6	4
Cappamore	4	0	1	3	58	77	−19	1
Blackrock	4	0	1	3	33	63	−30	1

=== Group 4 results ===
20 April 1997 Round 1	Cappamore	0–14 – 3–09	Eastern Gaels	Harty Park
	T Mulcahy 0–1, S O'Dwyer 0–1, M Gleeson 0–1, S Ryan 0–1.		F Stokes 1–1, M Hederman 1–0, S Roche 1–0.

20 April 1997 Round 1	Blackrock	0–03 – 3–11	Ballybrown	Fr Hayes Memorial Park
	P Heffernan 0–2, D Danagher 0–1.		P Hartigan 0–5, P McCarthy 1–1, L O'Gorman 1–0, P Mulqueen 1–0, O O'Connor 0–3, C Coughlan 0–2.

4 May 1997 Round 2	Adare	1–10 – 2–05	Eastern Gaels	Gaelic Grounds
	S Fitzgibbon 1–4, T Houlihan 0–4, C Murphy 0–1, J Foley 0–1.		M Murnane 1–2, M Clohessy 1–1, S Roche 0–1, I O'Callaghan 0–1.

4 May 1997 Round 2	Ballybrown	2–08 – 1–10	Cappamore	Fr Hayes Memorial Park
	O O'Connor 2–1, P Hartigan 0–6, N Doolin 0–1.		T Mulcahy 1–2, M Gleeson 0–4, L Hammersley 0–4.

22 June 1997 Round 3	Ballybrown	1–10 – 0–10	Adare	Bruff Grounds
	P Mulqueen 1–0, C Coughlan 0–3, O O'Connor 0–2, N Doolin 0–1, P Hartigan 0–1, T Hall 0–1, P O'Connor 0–1, S Adams 0–1.		C Murphy 0–4, B Heffernan 0–2, M Foley 0–2, S Fitzgerald 0–1, J Barrett 0–1.

22 June 1997 Round 3	Blackrock	4–10 – 2–16	Cappamore	Gaelic Grounds
	P McCarthy 3–2, P Heffernan 0–5, J Quilty 1–0, P McGrath 0–2, G O'Brien 0–1.		P Gleeson 0–10, M Gleeson 1–0, M Doherty 1–0, D O'Donnell 0–2, T Mulcahy 0–2, K Hickey 0–1, L Hammersley 0–1.

5 July 1997 Round 4	Ballybrown	2–19 – 3–08	Eastern Gaels	Bruff Grounds
	N Doolin 1–3, S Adams 1–2, C Coughlan 0–5, L O'Gorman 0–4, O O'Connor 0–2, O O'Connor 0–2, J O'Connor 0–1.		M Murnane 1–4, M Hedderman 1–1, S Roche 1–0, C Hickey 0–2, M Carroll 0–1.

6 July 1997 Round 4	Adare	1–18 – 1–05	Blackrock	Ballyagran Grounds
	S Fitzgibbon 1–5, T Healy 0–4, M Foley 0–4, M Alfred 0–3, M Giltenane 0–1, B Heffernan 0–1.		J O'Neill 1–0, D Quilty 0–2, P McCarthy 0–2, A Fitzgerald 0–1.

20 July 1997 Round 5	Adare	3–14 – 2–03	Cappamore	FitzGerald Park
	S Fitzgibbon 1–6, D Butler 1–1, B Foley 1–0, M Alfred 0–2, A O'Rahilly 0–1, M Giltenane 0–1, J Barrett 0–1, B Heffernan 0–1, C Murphy 0–1.		T Mulcahy 1–2, P Gleeson 1–0, S Ryan 0–1.

20 July 1997 Round 5	Eastern Gaels	w/o – scr	Blackrock	Bruff Grounds

== Knockout stage ==
=== Quarter-finals ===
9 August 1997 Quarter-final	Adare	4–09 – 1–17	Claughaun	Bruff Grounds
	S Fitzgibbon 1–0, T Healy 1–0, B Heffernan 1–0, C Murphy 0–3, M Alfred 0–2, B Foley 0–2, J Barrett 0–2.		M Galligan 0–8, D Holmes 1–1, L O'Connor 0–3, G Ryan 0–3, D Fitzgerald 0–2.

10 August 1997 Quarter-final	Patrickswell	1–15 – 1–11	KIlleedy	FitzGerald Park
	G Kirby 0–7, B Foley 1–0, A Purcell 0–3, K Carey 0–2, P Carey 0–1, A Carmody 0–1, N Carey 0–1.		R Hayes 0–7, J Magner 1–0, J O'Connor 0–2, J Kelleher 0–1, J Hayes 0–1.

10 August 1997 Quarter-final	Garryspillane	2–10 – 2–10	Ballybrown	Bruff Grounds
	F Carroll 0–7, Donie Ryan 1–1, TJ Ryan 1–1, J O'Keeffe 0–1.		P Hartigan 0–5, S Adams 1–0, C Coughlan 1–0, L O'Gorman 0–2, N Doolin 0–2, P Davoren 0–1.

15 August 1997 Quarter-final	Kilmallock	0–13 – 2–05	Doon	Gaelic Grounds
	M Cronin 0–5, L Neenan 0–3, D Clarke 0–3, M Houlihan 0–1, J Fitzgerald 0–1.		J Donovan 1–2, G McGrath 1–0, D Anderson 0–2, D Ryan 0–1.

17 August 1997 Quarter-final replay	Garryspillane	4–13 – 2–10	Ballybrown	Bruff Grounds
	F Carroll 1–6, Donie Ryan 2–2, J O'Keeffe 1–0, R English 0–3, TJ Ryan 0–1, M O'Brien 0–1.		S Adams 2–0, L O'Gorman 0–4, P Hartigan 0–3, N Doolin 0–1, C Coughlan 0–1, P Davoren 0–1.

=== Semi-finals ===
6 September 1997 Semi-final	Garryspillane	1–14 – 1–10	Kilmallock	Bruff Grounds
	F Carroll 1–4, D Ryan 0–4, R English 0–3, TJ Ryan 0–1, M O'Dea 0–1, J O'Keeffe 0–1.		L Neenan 0–4, P Tobin 1–0, M Houlihan 0–3, M Cronin 0–2, M Nelligan 0–1.

6 September 1997 Semi-final	Patrickswell	2–20 – 1–05	Adare	Bruff Grounds
	G Kirby 1–11, E Geary 1–2, B Foley 0–4, N Carey 0–1, A Purcell 0–1, K Carey 0–1.		B Foley 1–1, S Fitzgibbon 0–3, E Fitzgerald 0–1.

=== Final ===
21 September 1997 Final	Patrickswell	1–12 – 0–09	Garryspillane	Gaelic Grounds
	G Kirby 1–8, A Purcell 0–2, K Carey 0–1, B Foley 0–1.		F Carroll 0–6, TJ Ryan 0–2, J O'Keeffe 0–1.

== Championship statistics ==
=== Top scorers ===
Rank	Player	Club	Tally	Total	Matches	Average
1	Gary Kirby	Patrickswell	7–61	82	7	11.71
2	Frankie Carroll	Garryspillane	4–41	53	8	6.62
3	Mike Galligan	Claughaun	1–34	37	4	9.25
4	Donie Ryan	Garryspillane	7–09	30	8	3.75
4	Shane Fitzgibbon	Adare	4–18	30	6	5.00
