= Ciarán Carey =

Limerick hurler

Personal information
- Native name: Ciarán Ó Ciara (Irish)
- Born: 16 January 1970 (age 56) Patrickswell, County Limerick, Ireland
- Occupation: Addiction counsellor
- Height: 6 ft 0 in (183 cm)

Sport
- Sport: Hurling
- Position: Centre-back
Club
- Years: Club
- 1987–2010: Patrickswell
Club titles
- Limerick titles: 9
- Munster titles: 2
- All-Ireland Titles: 0
Inter-county*
Years	County	Apps (scores)
1989–2004	Limerick	35 (1–27)
Inter-county titles
- Munster titles: 2
- All-Irelands: 0
- NHL: 2
- All Stars: 3
- *Inter County team apps and scores correct as of 18:09, 29 November 2013.

Ciarán Carey (born 16 January 1970) is an Irish hurling manager, selector and former player.

Primarily playing at the centre-back position, Carey's club career was with Patrickswell and at inter-county level with Limerick. He was a key member of the latter team during the 1990s and collected two Munster titles, two National Hurling League titles and three All-Star awards.

In retirement from playing Carey has become involved in team management and coaching. At club level he has taken charge of the Tournafulla and Granagh-Ballingarry sides in hurling and camogie respectively. Carey began his inter-county coaching career when he was appointed manager of the Limerick senior camogie team in 2007. He subsequently took charge of the Limerick under-21 hurling team as well as being a selector with the Limerick senior hurling team under Dónal O'Grady. In November 2013, Carey was appointed for a second spell as manager of the Limerick under-21 team.

== Early life ==
Ciarán Carey was born in Patrickswell, County Limerick in 1970. He was educated locally and from an early age he showed an interest in the game of hurling. Carey's brothers, Pa and Paul, as well as his nephew Cian Lynch have also played for Limerick.

== Playing career ==
=== Club ===
Carey played his club hurling with the Patrickswell team in a club career that spanned three decades. He first came to prominence as a member of the club's minor team, capturing a county championship winners' medal in 1984.

Carey had just turned seventeen years-old when he lined out in his first senior county championship final as goalkeeper. Parish rivals Ballybrown provided the opposition, however, 'the Well' narrowly took the title by 1–17 to 3–10 and Carey collected his first county championship winners' medal.

In 1988 Patrickswell contested the county championship decider for the second consecutive year. Cappamore provided the opposition, however, Patrickswell triumphed by ten points and Carey added a second county title to his collection. Patrickswell later represented the county in the provincial series of games and even reached the final. The famous Mount Sion club provided the opposition, however, Patrickswell won by 3–13 to 2–13 and Carey added a Munster club winners' medal to his collection. Patrickswell's run of success came to an end in the All-Ireland semi-final when the O'Donovan Rossa GAC Belfast club defeated the Munster champions by a single point.

Patrickswell failed to make it three-in-a-row in 1989, however, the team bounced back the following year to defeat Adare and give Carey a third county championship title. He later missed the club's Munster final triumph over Éire Óg, however, he was back on the team for the All-Ireland final against Glenmore. The game was an exciting one, however, Patrickswell only held the lead on one occasion when Leonard Enright opened the scoring. A 1–13 to 0–12 score line gave Glenmore the title.

The next decade saw Patrickswell become the dominant force in club hurling in Limerick. Carey won his fourth county championship title in 1993. He added to his haul of medals as Patrickswell won three county championships in-a-row in 1995, 1996 and 1997. This latter win was subsequently followed by another Munster final appearance. Clarecastle provided the opposition and eventually won the game by two points.

Four-in-a-row proved beyond Patrickswell, however, in 2000 a one-point defeat of Doon gave Carey an eighth county championship winners' medal.

Defeat in 2001 was followed by a ninth success for Carey in 2003 when Adare were accounted for by two points. Patrickswell subsequently qualified for the Munster final, however, cork champions Newtwonshandrum recorded a 2–18 to 2–9 victory.

In 2006 Carey had the chance to capture a remarkable tenth county championship title. Bruree, a team who last won the championship in 1893, were the opponents. While Patrickswell were expected to win by many a 1–16 to 1–15 score line resulted in defeat for Carey.

=== Inter-county ===
Carey made his senior championship debut for Limerick in 1989 at a time when the county team was in the doldrums. His first few seasons on the team ended with an early exit from the provincial championship, however, in 1992 Limerick's fortunes began to change. That year Carey's side qualified for the final of the National Hurling League and a stern test awaited. Reigning All-Ireland champions Tipperary provided the opposition and took an eight-point lead at half-time. Limerick battled back to claim a narrow 0–0–14 to 0–13 victory and gave Carey his first National League winners' medal. The new league champions built on this momentum and subsequently qualified for a Munster final showdown with Cork. A high-scoring game developed, however, at the long whistle Cork were the champions by 1–22 to 3–11. In spite of this disappointment Carey was subsequently presented with his first All-Star award.

Limerick failed to reach the provincial decider the following year, however, in 1994 Carey's team bounced back and qualified for the Munster final again. Provincial whipping boys Clare were the opponents and a rout took place. A 0–25 to 2–10 score line gave Limerick the win and gave Carey his first Munster winners' medal. Limerick subsequently qualified to meet Offaly in the All-Ireland final. It looked as if Carey's side were going to make history and claim the title as Limerick had a five-point lead with as many minutes left. Offaly suddenly sprang to life following a Johnny Dooley goal from a close-in free. Following the puck-out Offaly worked the ball upfield and Pat O'Connor struck for a second goal. The Offaly forwards scored another five unanswered points in the time remaining to secure a 3–16 to 2–13 victory. It was a bitter blow for Limerick who looked as if they had one hand on the Liam MacCarthy Cup. In spite of the defeat Carey was later presented with a second All-Star award.

Carey surrendered their Munster title to Clare in 1995, however, both sides met in the opening round of the championship the following year. Clare went into the game as reigning All-Ireland champions, however, neither side took a decisive lead. With time running out both side were still deadlocked, however, Carey played a captain's role in securing the win. In injury time Carey caught a puck-out, ran 50 yards with the ball balanced on the bas of his hurley and scored the winning point for Limerick. Limerick later faced Tipperary in the provincial final and looked to be heading out of the championship as Tipp took a ten-point lead. Carey's side battled back to secure a 0–19 to 1–16 draw and a second chance to defeat their near rivals. The replay also saw Tipperary take a decisive lead, however, Limerick's goal-scoring ability was the deciding factor. A 4–7 to 0–16 score line gave Limerick the title and gave Carey a second Munster winners' medal. The subsequent All-Ireland final pitted Limerick against Wexford for the first time in over forty years. The game was far from a classic; however, it did provide excitement. Tom Dempsey was the hero of the day as he scored a goal after nineteen minutes to give Wexford a major advantage. His side led by 1–8 to 0–10 at half-time in spite of having Éamonn Scallan sent off. Wexford took a four-point lead in the second-half; however, this was whittled back to two points as Wexford hung on for the last twenty minutes. The final score of 1–13 to 0–14 showed how vital Dempsey's goal was. It was Limerick's second All-Ireland defeat in two years. Once again Carey's individual skill was recognised when he collected his third All-Star award.

Limerick bounced back immediately in 1997 by defeating Galway by 1–12 to 1–9 to take the National League title. It was Carey's second winners' medal in that competition. The recent All-Ireland defeats, however, seemed to have damaged the team as Carey's side crashed out of the provincial championship at an early stage.

This process repeated itself over the next few years and it was 2001 before Carey lined out in another Munster final. Tipperary were the opponents on that occasion, however, Limerick fell by 2–16 to 1–17.

Carey was now in the twilight of his career and success seemed as far away for Limerick as it did when he joined the panel in 1989. He was named team captain for 2004, however, his last game at senior level was a National League tie between Limerick and Tipperary and he called time on his career before the start of the championship.

Four years after his retirement at senior level Carey was back in a Limerick jersey on the county's intermediate team. He was full-back on the Limerick team that faced Tipperary in the provincial final. A 2–16 to 2–12 score line gave Limerick the win and gave Carey a Munster winners' medal at intermediate level. Limerick later faced Kilkenny in the All-Ireland final, however, Carey was left on the losing side once again as 'the Cats' recorded a 1–16 to 0–13 win.

=== Inter-provincial ===
Carey was selected for the Munster team in the inter-provincial series of games. He first lined out for his province in 1991 as Munster faced Connacht in the decider. That game ended in defeat for Carey's side as the westerners won by 1–13 to 0–12.

After being omitted in 1992 Carey was back on the team again the following year; however, Munster were defeated in the opening game. He was not selected again the following year; however, in 1995, Carey was at midfield as Munster reached the final. Ulster provided the opposition; however, Munster scraped a win by 0–13 to 1–9 and Carey collected a Railway Cup winners' medal.

Munster retained the title in 1996 and made it three-in-a-row in 1997. Carey featured in both of these victories.

After failing to make the team for three years, Carey was back with Munster for the final time in 2001. On that occasion Munster faced Connacht in the decider; however, the southerners had a comfortable 1–21 to 1–15 victory and Carey collected his fourth Railway Cup title.

== Managerial career ==
=== Early experience ===
In 2007 Carey turned his hand to management when he was appointed to take over the Limerick senior camogie team. Success was immediate as he guided Limerick to the All-Ireland 'B' final. Cork were the opponents, however, the game ended in a 1–10 to 2–7 draw. The subsequent replay was much more conclusive as Carey's side trounced 'the Rebelettes' by 2–9 to 0–6 to take the All-Ireland 'B' title. Carey was later nominated for the Philips camogie manager of the year awards and, while he was expected to stay on as manager, he stepped down shortly afterwards.

In 2007 Carey simultaneously took charge of the Tournafulla senior club hurling team, however, he left after an unsuccessful season in charge.

In spite of leaving the posts of Limerick camogie and Tournafulla club manager, Carey returned to inter-county coaching when he was appointed manager of the Limerick under-21 hurling team in early 2008. His tenure in charge was not a successful one as Limerick crashed out of the provincial championship at a very early stage. Carey resigned as manager early in 2009 due to work commitments.

=== Limerick ===
In September 2010, Carey was named as a selector – along with former teammates Pat Heffernan and T. J. Ryan – of Dónal O'Grady's Limerick senior hurling team for 2011.

=== Patrickwell (first spell) ===
Carey guided Patrickswell to the 2015 Limerick SHC final. He then left to take over as Kerry senior manager.

=== Kerry ===
In October 2015, Carey was named as the new manager of the Kerry county hurling team.

Carey stepped down as Kerry senior hurling manager on 4 December 2016, citing increased work commitments for his decision.

=== Patrickswell (second spell) ===
In his second spell in charge of Patrickswell, Carey led the club to the 2019 Limerick SHC title, defeating Na Piarsaigh, seeking a third consecutive title, in the final.

=== Patrickswell (third spell) ===
Carey was ratified as Patrickswell senior hurling manager for a third time on 6 February 2024.

== Career statistics ==
=== Manager ===
As of match played 22 May 2016.

Team	From	To	Munster League				National League				Leinster				All-Ireland				Total				
Team	From	To	G	W	D	L	G	W	D	L	G	W	D	L	G	W	D	L	G	W	D	L	Win %
Kerry	2 November 2015	4 December 2016	4	0	0	4	6	3	0	3	3	1	0	2	0	0	0	0	13	4	0	9	30

Sporting positions
Preceded by Mike Houlihan	Limerick Senior Hurling Captain; 1996	Succeeded by Gary Kirby
Preceded by Gary Kirby	Limerick Senior Hurling Captain; 1998	Succeeded by Ollie Moran
Preceded by	Limerick Senior Camogie Manager; 2007–2008	Succeeded by Phelim Macken
Preceded by Declan Fitzgerald	Limerick Under-21 Hurling Manager; 2008–2009	Succeeded by Leo O'Connor
Preceded by T. J. Ryan	Limerick Under-21 Hurling Manager; 2013–2014	Succeeded by John Kiely
Preceded by Éamonn Kelly	Kerry Senior Hurling Manager; 2015–2016	Succeeded by Fintan O'Connor
