= 2003 Limerick Senior Hurling Championship =

Annual hurling competition season

- Dates: 20 June – 12 October 2003
- Teams: 10
- Sponsor: AIB
- Champions: Patrickswell (18th title); Paul Carey (captain); Jim Fawl (manager)
- Runners-up: Adare; Mark Foley (captain); Pat Lavin (manager)
- Relegated: Garryspillane

Tournament statistics
- Matches played: 22
- Goals scored: 61 (2.77 per match)
- Points scored: 522 (23.73 per match)
- Top scorer(s): Conor Fitzgerald (0–55)

The 2003 Limerick Senior Hurling Championship was the 109th staging of the Limerick Senior Hurling Championship since its establishment by the Limerick County Board in 1887. The championship ran from 20 June to 12 October 2003.

Adare entered the championship as the defending champions.

The final was played on 12 October 2003 at the Gaelic Grounds in Limerick, between Patrickswell and Adare, in what was their fifth meeting in the final overall and a first final meeting in two years. Patrickswell won the match by 1–13 to 0–14 to claim their 18th championship title overall and a first title in three years. The win also allowed them to draw level with Ahane at the top of the all-time roll of honour.

Adare's Conor Fitzgerald was the championship's top scorer with 0–55.

== Format change ==
16 teams took part in the 2002 Limerick SHC, however, a new format was introduced which resulted in the top eight teams being divided into two groups of four. After the group stage the top three teams in each group qualified for the quarter-finals. The bottom team in each group faced each other in a relegation playoff. The other eight teams played in the newly-created Limerick Senior B Hurling Championship. Those eight teams were also divided into two groups of four. After the group stage the top team in each group also qualified for the quarter-finals.

== Group 1 ==
=== Group 1 table ===
Quarter-finalists Relegation playoff

Team	Matches				Score			Pts
Team	Pld	W	D	L	For	Against	Diff	Pts
Adare	3	2	1	0	53	46	7	5
Croom	3	1	1	1	53	47	6	3
Doon	3	1	1	1	45	51	−6	3
Garryspillane	3	0	0	3	41	48	−7	0

=== Group 1 results ===
20 June 2003 Round 1	Croom	2–11 – 1–11	Garryspillane	FitzGerald Park
	M Cregan 1–3, T Carmody 1–2, M O'Riordan 0–2, P Lawlor 0–2, J Quirke 0–1, P Cahill 0–1.		P Tobin 1–2, D Ryan 0–4, P Hyland 0–2, C Hickey 0–2, TJ Ryan 0–1.

20 June 2003 Round 1	Doon	2–11 – 1–14	Adare	Bruff Grounds
	M McKenna 0–6, D Stapleton 1–0, J O'Brien 1–0, T Hayes 0–2, E Stapleton 0–2, P Tobin 0–1.		C Fitzgerald 0–7, B Foley 1–1, M Foley 0–2, A O'Rahilly 0–1, S Lavin 0–1, B Sexton 0–1.

6 July 2003 Round 2	Doon	2–10 – 0–13	Garryspillane	Bruff Grounds
	M McKenna 2–7, Derek Ryan 0–1, T Hayes 0–1, D Anderson 0–1.		Donie Ryan 0–7, F Carroll 0–4, TJ Ryan 0–1, C Hickey 0–1.

27 July 2003 Round 2	Adare	1–18 – 0–15	Croom	Bruff Grounds
	C Fitzgerald 0–9, B Foley 1–2, M Foley 0–2, D Sheehan 0–2, S Lavin 0–1, C Murphy 0–1, B Sexton 0–1.		J Barry 0–4, M Cregan 0–4, N O'Riordan 0–2, M Cahill 0–1, P Cahill 0–1, H Flavin 0–1, J Quirke 0–1, M O'Riordan 0–1.

9 August 2003 Round 3	Croom	2–15 – 1–09	Doon	Bruff Grounds
	T Carmody 1–3, M Cahill 1–1, M Cregan 0–3, P Lawlor 0–3, S Lucey 0–2, H Flavin 0–2, N O'Riordan 0–1.		M McKenna 1–4, D Anderson 0–2, D Stapleton 0–2, T Hayes 0–1.

9 August 2003 Round 3	Adare	1–12 – 0–14	Garryspillane	FitzGerald Park
	C Fitzgerald 0–7, M Foley 1–0, B Foley 0–2, D Sheehan 0–1, B Sexton 0–1, A O'Connell 0–1.		F Carroll 0–7, TJ Ryan 0–4, D Ryan 0–1, P Hyland 0–1, P Tobin 0–1.

== Group 2 ==
=== Group 2 table ===
Quarter-finalists Relegation playoff

Team	Matches				Score			Pts
Team	Pld	W	D	L	For	Against	Diff	Pts
Ahane	3	3	0	0	56	30	26	6
Patrickswell	3	1	1	1	47	39	8	3
Kilmallock	3	1	1	1	48	53	−5	3
Na Piarsaigh	3	0	0	3	32	61	−7	0

=== Group 2 results ===
22 June 2003 Round 1	Na Piarsaigh	1–08 – 2–09	Ahane	Bruff Grounds
	K Bermingham 1–0, B Hartnett 0–3, E Moriarty 0–1, S O'Neill 0–1, D Hennessy 0–1, C Sherlock 0–1, R Hennessy 0–1.		J Moran 1–1, J Meskell 0–4, P Ryan 1–0, N Moran 0–2, S O'Connor 0–2.

22 June 2003 Round 1	Kilmallock	1–12 – 1–12	Patrickswell	Bruff Grounds
	A O'Shaughnessy 1–6, S Burchill 0–2, M Houlihan 0–2, P Connery 0–1, B O'Sullivan 0–1.		B Foley 0–5, K Carey 1–1, P O'Grady 0–3, E Foley 0–1, B Geoghan 0–1, D O'Grady 0–1.

4 July 2003 Round 2	Patrickswell	3–13 – 0–10	Na Piarsaigh	Mungret Grounds
	G Kirby 2–4, P O'Grady 0–5, K Carey 1–1, B Foley 0–1, D O'Grady 0–1, B Geoghegan 0–1.		B Hartnett 0–4, K Bermingham 0–3, D Hennessy 0–1, R Marsh 0–1, E Kelly 0–1.

20 July 2003 Round 2	Ahane	5–12 – 1–06	Kilmallock	Fr Hayes Memorial Park
	P Ryan 2–1, J Meskell 1–4, S O'Connor 1–1, B Healy 1–1, A O'Doherty 0–2, N Moran 0–2.		A O'Shaughnessy 1–4, P Connery 0–1, M Houlihan 0–1.

10 August 2003 Round 3	Kilmallock	4–12 – 1–08	Na Piarsaigh	Bruff Grounds
	A O'Shaughnessy 2–4, M Houlihan 0–5, P Connery 1–1, P Tobin 1–1, D O'Mahony 0–1.		C Sherlock 1–0, B Hartnett 0–2, D Breen 0–2, S O'Neill 0–2, D Hennessy 0–1, D Quigley 0–1.

10 August 2003 Round 3	Ahane	2–08 – 0–10	Patrickswell	Bruff Grounds
	J Meskell 0–5, T Fitzgerald 1–1, B Healy 1–0, C Smith 0–1, David Laing 0–1.		P O'Grady 0–6, D O'Grady 0–2, A Carmody 0–1, G Kirby 0–1.

== Relegation stage ==
=== Relegation final ===
24 August 2003 Playoff	Garryspillane	1–14 – 3–11	Na Piarsaigh	FitzGerald Park
		Report

== Knockout stage ==
=== Quarter-finals ===
31 August 2003 Quarter-final	Patrickswell	2–16 – 3–13	Doon	Bruff Grounds
	P O'Grady 0–10, J McDermott 1–0, D O'Grady 1–0, G Kirby 0–2, K Carey 0–1, E Foley 0–1, E Carmody 0–1, B Geoghegan 0–1.		M McKenna 0–8, B Crowe 1–3, D Stapleton 1–1, P Coleman 1–0, M Fitzgerald 0–1.

31 August 2003 Quarter-final	Kilmallock	1–10 – 0–12	Croom	Bruff Grounds
	A O'Shaughnessy 1–5, K Kennelly 0–2, M Houlihan 0–2, C O'Dwyer 0–1.		P Lawlor 0–3, J Barry 0–3, M Cahill 0–2, P Cahill 0–2, S Lucey 0–1, M O'Riordan 0–1.

7 September 2003 Quarter-final	Adare	1–17 – 0–13	Murroe/Boher	Bruff Grounds
	C Fitzgerald 0–7, B Sexton 1–3, D Sheehan 0–3, M Foley 0–3, P Keane 0–1.		E O'Neill 0–3, P Tobin 0–3, P Laffan 0–3, J Butler 0–3, J Quaid 0–1.

7 September 2003 Quarter-final	Ahane	2–17 – 1–05	Ballybrown	Bruff Grounds
	J Meskell 1–5, N Moran 0–7, S O'Connor 1–1, M Fitzgerald 0–2, A Smith 0–1, A O'Doherty 0–1.		A O'Connor 1–4, I Burke 0–1.

7 September 2003 Quarter-final replay	Patrickswell	3–20 – 3–10	Doon	Bruff Grounds
	P O'Grady 1–7, A Carmody 0–4, K Carey 1–0, B Geoghegan 1–0, J McDermott 0–3, D O'Grady 0–2, G Kirby 0–2, P O'Reilly 0–1, E Foley 0–1.		M McKenna 1–5, T Hayes 1–0, J O'Brien 1–0, B Crowe 0–2, M Fitzgerald 0–1, P Coleman 0–1, D Stapleton 0–1.

- Ballybrown and Murroe/Boher joined at this stage via the Limerick Senior B Hurling Championship.

=== Semi-finals ===
21 September 2003 Semi-final	Patrickswell	2–08 – 0–11	Ahane	Gaelic Grounds
	D O'Grady 1–1, E Foley 1–1, P O'Grady 0–3, K Carey 0–1, P Carey 0–1, G Kirby 0–1.		J Meskell 0–4, N Moran 0–3, O Moran 0–1, M Fitzgerald 0–1, S O'Connor 0–1, J Moran 0–1.

21 September 2003 Semi-final	Adare	0–13 – 2–07	Kilmallock	Gaelic Grounds
	C Fitzgerald 0–6, C Murphy 0–1, C Cribben 0–1, A O'Donnell 0–1, M Foley 0–1, B Foley 0–1, B Sexton 0–1, D Sheehan 0–1.		A O'Shaughnessy 1–2, P Tobin 1–0, M Houlihan 0–2, P Connery 0–1, M O'Riordan 0–1, D O'Mahony 0–1.

28 September 2003 Semi-final replay	Adare	1–13 – 1–12	Kilmallock	Gaelic Grounds
	C Fitzgerald 0–9, D Sheehan 1–1, M Foley 0–1, C Murphy 0–1, B Sexton 0–1.		A O'Shaughnessy 1–6, M Houlihan 0–4, A Maguire 0–1, S Burchill 0–1.

=== Final ===
12 October 2003 Final	Patrickswell	1–13 – 0–14	Adare	Gaelic Grounds, Limerick
	P O'Grady 0–6, J McDermott 1–0, G Kirby, Peter O'Reilly 0–2 each. B Geoghegan, D O'Grady, C Carey 0–1 each.		C Fitzgerald 0–10, S Lavin 0–2, C Murphy, B Heffernan 0–1 each.

== Championship statistics ==
=== Top scorers ===
Rank	Player	Club	Tally	Total	Matches	Average
1	Conor Fitzgerald	Adare	0–55	55	7	7.85
2	Andrew O'Shaughnessy	Kilmallock	7–27	48	6	8.00
3	Paul O'Grady	Patrickswell	1–40	43	7	6.14
4	Mike McKenna	Doon	4–30	42	5	8.40
5	John Meskell	Ahane	2–22	28	5	5.60
