= Mark Quinlan =

Irish hurler

Personal information
- Native name: Marc Ó Caoinnealáin (Irish)
- Born: 2000 (age 25–26) Garryspillane, County Limerick, Ireland
- Occupation: Student

Sport
- Sport: Hurling
- Position: Right wing-back
Clubs
- Years: Club
- Garryspillane; Galbally
Club titles
- Limerick titles: 0
Inter-county*
| Years | County | Apps (scores) |
| 2019-present | Limerick | 0 (0-00) |
Inter-county titles
- Munster titles: 1
- All-Irelands: 1
- NHL: 2
- All Stars: 0
- *Inter County team apps and scores correct as of 18:50, 09 April 2023.

Mark Quinlan (born 2000, Galbally, County Limerick) is an Irish hurler who plays for Limerick Senior Championship club Garryspillane and at inter-county level with the Limerick senior hurling team. He usually lines out as a right wing-back.

== Career statistics ==
As of match played 23 March 2024.

| Team | Year | National League | | | Munster | | All-Ireland | | Total | |
| Team | Year | Division | Apps | Score | Apps | Score | Apps | Score | Apps | Score |
|---|---|---|---|---|---|---|---|---|---|---|
| Limerick | 2020 | Division 1A | 0 | 0-00 | 0 | 0-00 | 0 | 0-00 | 0 | 0-00 |
| Limerick | 2021 | | 1 | 0-00 | 0 | 0-00 | 0 | 0-00 | 1 | 0-00 |
| | 2022 | | 0 | 0-00 | 0 | 0-00 | 0 | 0-00 | 0 | 0-00 |
| | 2023 | | 2 | 0-00 | 0 | 0-00 | 0 | 0-00 | 2 | 0-00 |
| | 2024 | | 3 | 0-00 | 0 | 0-00 | 0 | 0-00 | 3 | 0-00 |
| Career total | | | 6 | 0-00 | 0 | 0-00 | 0 | 0-00 | 6 | 0-00 |

== Honours ==
Garryspillane

- Limerick Premier Intermediate Hurling Championship (1): 2019

Limerick

- All-Ireland Senior Hurling Championship (1): 2020
- Munster Senior Hurling Championship (1): 2020
- National Hurling League (1): 2020
- Munster Senior Hurling League (2): 2020
