= Pa Carey =

Irish hurler

Personal information
- Native name: Pádraig Ó Ciara (Irish)
- Born: 1966 (age 59–60) Patrickswell, County Limerick, Ireland

Sport
- Sport: Hurling
- Position: Full-back
Club
- Years: Club
- Patrickswell
Club titles
- Limerick titles: 8
- Munster titles: 2
- All-Ireland Titles: 0
Inter-county
- Years: County
- 1986-1998: Limerick
Inter-county titles
- Munster titles: 0
- All-Irelands: 0
- NHL: 1
- All Stars: 0

Patrick Carey (born 1966) is an Irish former hurler. At club level, he played with Patrickswell and at inter-county level with the Limerick senior hurling team.

== Career ==
At club level, Carey began his career at juvenile and underage levels with Patrickswell, winning a Limerick MAHC title as team captain in 1984, before progressing to adult level. Carey's senior career coincided with a very successful era for Patrickswell and he won eight Limerick SHC medals between 1984 and 1997. His other club honours include two Munster Club SHC medals, while he lined out at centre-back when losing to Glenmore in the 1991 All-Ireland club final.

At inter-county level, Carey first played for Limerick as part of the minor team that beat Kilkenny to win the All-Ireland MHC title in 1984. He progressed to the under-21 team and won consecutive Munster U21HC titles, before claiming an All-Ireland U21HC medal after a 2-15 to 3-06 win over Galway in the 1987 final.

Carey joined the senior team in 1986. He claimed his only senior silverware in 1992 when Limerick won the National Hurling League title. Carey was on and off the team over the course of the following few years before being released from the panel for the final time in 1998.

Performances at inter-county level for Limerick resulted in Carey being called up to the Munster inter-provincial team. He won a Railway Cup medal as a panel member in 1992 after a defeat of Ulster in the final.

== Personal life ==
His uncle, Éamonn Carey, was part of Limerick's All-Ireland MHC-winning panel in 1958, while his brothers, Ciarán and Paul Carey, also lined out with Patrickswell and Limerick. Carey's nephew, Cian Lynch, has won five All-Ireland SHC medals with Limerick.

== Honours ==
Patrickswell

- Munster Senior Club Hurling Championship: 1988, 1990
- Limerick Senior Hurling Championship: 1984, 1987, 1988, 1990, 1993, 1995, 1996 (c), 1997 (c)
- Limerick Minor A Hurling Championship: 1984 (c)

Limerick

- National Hurling League: 1991–92
- All-Ireland Under-21 Hurling Championship: 1987
- Munster Under-21 Hurling Championship: 1986, 1987
- All-Ireland Minor Hurling Championship: 1984
- Munster Minor Hurling Championship: 1984

Munster

- Railway Cup: 1992
