= 2001 Limerick Senior Hurling Championship =

Annual hurling competition season

- Teams: 16
- Sponsor: TSB
- Champions: Adare (1st title); Mark Foley (captain); Dave Keane (manager)
- Runners-up: Patrickswell; Gary Kirby (captain); P. J. O'Grady (manager)
- Relegated: Claughaun

Tournament statistics
- Matches played: 36
- Goals scored: 131 (3.64 per match)
- Points scored: 801 (22.25 per match)
- Top scorer(s): Frankie Carroll (3–30)

The 2001 Limerick Senior Hurling Championship was the 107th staging of the Limerick Senior Hurling Championship since its establishment by the Limerick County Board in 1887. The draw for the group stage placings took place on 13 February 2001.

Patrickswell were the defending champions.

The final was played on 21 October 2001 at the Gaelic Grounds in Limerick, between Adare and Patrickswell, in what was their fourth meeting in the final overall and a first final meeting in five years. Adare won the match by 2–17 to 2–08 to claim their first ever championship title.

Garryspillane's Frankie Carroll was the championship's top scorer with 3–30.

== Team changes ==
=== To Championship ===
Promoted from the Limerick Intermediate Hurling Championship

- Hospital-Herbertstown

=== From Championship ===
Relegated to the Limerick Intermediate Hurling Championship

- Pallasgreen

== Group 1 ==
=== Group 1 table ===
Knockout stage Relegation stage

Team	Matches				Score			Pts
Team	Pld	W	D	L	For	Against	Diff	Pts
Adare	3	2	1	0	53	35	18	5
Doon	3	2	1	0	49	42	7	5
Croom	3	1	0	2	49	39	10	2
Cappamore	3	0	0	3	32	67	−35	0

=== Group 1 results ===
26 June 2001 Round 1	Croom	3–16 – 0–09	Cappamore	FitzGerald Park
	J Barry 0–8.

8 July 2001 Round 1	Adare	3–06 – 1–12	Doon	Gaelic Grounds
	B Foley 1–0, B Kennedy 1–0, T Herbert 1–0, C Fitzgerald 0–3, M Foley 0–1, D Sheehan 0–1, B Heffernan 0–1.		P Coleman 0–4, L Ryan 1–0, B Crowe 0–3, D Ryan 0–2, J O'Brien 0–1, T Hayes 0–1, E Kennedy 0–1.

5 August 2001 Round 2	Adare	3–15 – 0–07	Cappamore	Bruff Grounds
	C Fitzgerald 0–6, M Foley 1–0, T Houlihan 1–0, B Foley 1–0, D Sheehan 0–3, B Heffernan 0–3, C Murphy 0–2, T Healy 0–1.		N Hayes 0–3, JJ Mulcahy 0–2, D O'Donnell 0–1, C Hayes 0–1.

5 August 2001 Round 2	Doon	2–10 – 2–05	Croom	Gaelic Grounds
	P Coleman 0–6, L Ryan 1–0, D Stapleton 1–0, D Anderson 0–2, F Kennedy 0–1, T Hayes 0–1.		J Barry 1–0, M Cahill 1–0, P Keyes 0–1, M Flavin 0–1, M Riordan 0–1, M Cregan 0–1, B Crofton 0–1.

10 August 2001 Round 3	Adare	0–14 – 3–04	Croom	Gaelic Grounds
	C Fitzgerald 0–9, J Foley 0–2, M Foley 0–2, B Foley 0–1.		M Cregan 1–2, M Riordan 1–0, H Flavin 1–0, P Lawlor 0–1, K Cregan 0–1.

10 August 2001 Round 3	Doon	1–15 – 2–10	Cappamore	Fr Hayes Memorial Park
	T Hayes 0–6, P Coleman 0–6, D Anderson 1–2, J Stokes 0–1.		M Gleeson 1–2, N Hayes 0–5, C Hayes 1–0, S O'Dwyer 0–2, R Hammersley 0–1.

== Group 2 ==
=== Group 2 table ===
Knockout stage Relegation stage

Team	Matches				Score			Pts
Team	Pld	W	D	L	For	Against	Diff	Pts
Patrickswell	3	3	0	0	74	35	39	6
Kilmallock	3	2	0	1	55	55	0	4
Killeedy	3	0	1	2	39	59	−20	1
Claughaun	3	0	1	2	38	57	−19	1

=== Group 2 results ===
24 June 2001 Round 1	Killeedy	2–07 – 0–13	Claughaun	FitzGerald Park
	R Hayes 1–1, J Kelleher 1–0, D Cremin 0–2, D Flynn 0–2, J Magner 0–1, P Cremin 0–1.		M Galligan 0–8, I McNamara 0–2, L O'Connor 0–1, D O'Driscoll 0–1, P McGarry 0–1.

8 July 2001 Round 1	Patrickswell	4–14 – 1–10	Kilmallock	Gaelic Grounds
	E Foley 2–2, G kirby 0–6, B Geoghegan 1–1, B Murray 1–0, B Foley 0–3, P O'Reilly 0–1, A Carmody 0–1.		A O'Shaughnessy 0–5, P Connery 1–1, < Houlihan 0-2, F Stapleton 0-1.

3 August 2001 Round 2	Patrickswell	4-15 - 2-10	Killeedy	Bruff Grounds
	G Kirby 1–4, P Foley 1–2, A Carmody 1–1, P O'Grady 1–1, B Geoghegan 0–3, D O'Grady 0–2, P O'Reilly 0–1, C Carey 0–1.		D Flynn 1–5, T Magner 1–1, P Cronin 0–3, R Hayes 0–1.

11 August 2001 Round 2	Claughaun	2–13 – 4–11	Kilmallock	Bruff Grounds
	M Galligan 1–8, L O'Connor 1–2, M Holland 0–1, A Kerley 0–1, D O'Driscoll 0–1.		A O'Shaughnessy 1–5, B Hanley 1–0, P Connery 1–0, D Barry 1–0, M Houlihan 0–2, D Clarke 0–1, M O'Riordan 0–1, P Tobin 0–1, J Fitzgerald 0–1.

14 August 2001 Round 3	Killeedy	1–07 – 3–10	Kilmallock	Páirc Caoimhín Ó Luing
	D Flynn 1–2, T Maguire 0–3, J Cunningham 0–1, P Cremin 0–1.		J Fitzgerald 1–3, P Connery 1–1, A O'Shaughnessy 0–4, P Tobin 1–0, C O'Dwyer 0–1, F Stapleton 0–1.

14 August 2001 Round 3	Patrickswell	2–15 – 0–06	Claughaun	Gaelic Grounds
	G Kirby 0–7, T O'Brien 1–1, B Foley 0–4, E Foley 1–0, P O'Grady 0–2, A Carmody 0–1.		M Galligan 0–3, T McGarry 0–1, D Lavery 0–1, I Maguire 0–1.

=== Group 2 playoff ===
2 September 2001 Playoff	Killeedy	1–11 – 0–11	Claughaun	Bruff Grounds
	R Hayes 1–2, J Kelleher 0–4, J Fitzmaurice 0–2, D Flynn 0–1, T Magner 0–1, R Cunningham 0–1.		M Galligan 0–6, K Holmes 0–3, D Lavery 0–1, I McNamara 0–1.

== Group 3 ==
=== Group 3 table ===
Knockout stage Relegation stage

Team	Matches				Score			Pts
Team	Pld	W	D	L	For	Against	Diff	Pts
Bruree	3	3	0	0	62	41	21	6
Murroe/Boher	3	1	1	1	58	46	12	3
Monaleen	3	1	1	1	56	60	−4	3
Hospital-Herbertstown	3	0	0	3	53	82	−29	0

=== Group 3 results ===
8 July 2001 Round 1	Bruree	3–15 – 4–07	Hospital-Herbertstown	FitzGerald Park
	S O'Connell 1–7, JV O'Brien 2–0, JC O'Brien 0–2, John O'Brien 0–2, C O'Shea 0–1, A O'Brien 0–1, S Murphy 0–1, B Hogan 0–1.		L Garvey 4–3, PJ Garvey 0–1, P Reale 0–1, D Reale 0–1, J McAuliffe 0–1.

8 July 2001 Round 1	Monaleen	2–11 – 3–08	Murroe/Boher	Gaelic Grounds
	S Mullane 1–6, J Cormican 0–4, G Larkin 1–0, P Moloney 0–1.		K Tobin 1–3, J Butler 1–1, D Brouder 1–0, P Tobin 0–3, C Brouder 0–1.

4 August 2001 Round 2	Murroe/Boher	5–17 – 3–04	Hospital-Herbertstown	Gaelic Grounds
	E O'Neill 3–4, J Butler 1–4, T Lynch 1–1, P Tobin 0–3, S O'Neill 0–2, K Tobin 0–2, C Broude r0-1.		B Fenton 2–0, L Garvey 1–1, D Carroll 0–2, J Allen 0–1.

5 August 2001 Round 2	Bruree	4–10 – 2–07	Monaleen	FitzGerald Park
	S O'Connell 2–7, JV O'Brien 2–1, J O'Brien 0–1, C O'Shea 0–1.		S Mullane 1–3, G Larkin 1–0, J Cormican 0–2, B Geary 0–1.

12 August 2001 Round 3	Bruree	2–10 – 1–06	Murroe/Boher	Gaelic Grounds
	S O'Connell 1–3, A Frawley 1–1, R Fenton 0–2, JV O'Brien 0–2, B Hogan 0–1, C O'Shea 0–1.		O O'Neill 1–4, J Butler 0–2.

12 August 2001 Round 3	Monaleen	5–11 – 5–06	Hospital-Herbertstown	FitzGerald Park
	P Farrell 3–0, G Larkin 1–2, S Mullane 0–5, M Gavin 1–1, K O'Connell 0–2, P Moloney 0–1.		D Carroll 1–2, L Garvey 1–2, H Allen 1–1, B Fenton 1–1, J McAuliffe 1–0.

=== Group 3 playoff ===
2 September 2001 Playoff	Murroe/Boher	2–13 – 1–10	Monaleen	Gaelic Grounds
	O O'Neil 1–4, P Tobin 0–5, D Brouder 0–2, K Tobin 0–1, J Butler 0–1.		S Mullane 0–6, G Larkin 1–0, K O'Connell 0–2, J Cormican 0–1, D Cosgrave 0–1.

== Group 4 ==
=== Group 4 table ===
Knockout stage Relegation stage

Team	Matches				Score			Pts
Team	Pld	W	D	L	For	Against	Diff	Pts
Garryspillane	3	3	0	0	58	39	19	6
Na Piarsaigh	3	1	1	1	45	43	2	3
Ballybrown	3	1	0	2	49	59	−10	2
Ahane	3	0	1	2	42	53	−11	1

=== Group 4 results ===
7 July 2001 Round 1	Ahane	1–10 – 0–13	Na Piarsaigh	FitzGerald Park
	J O'Grady 1–0, N Moran 0–3, S O'Connor 0–2, O Moran 0–2, C O'Reilly 0–1, J Moran 0–1, J Meskell 0–1.		S O'Neill 0–7, D Hennessy 0–2, J Cormack 0–2, H Mullan 0–1, C Sherlock 0–1.

8 July 2001 Round 1	Garryspillane	4–10 – 1–12	Ballybrown	Gaelic Grounds
	F Carroll 2–5, S Hickey 1–1, R Sampson 1–0, M O'Brien 0–2, TJ Ryan 0–1, M O'Donnell 0–1.		S Kiely 0–5, N Doolin 1–0, J Stapleton 0–3, P McCarthy 0–2, P Twomey 0–2.

5 August 2001 Round 2	Garryspillane	1–15 – 1–08	Na Piarsaigh	FitzGerald Park
	F Carroll 0–8, C Hickey 1–3, P Tobin 0–2, M O'Brien 0–1, R Sampson 0–1, J Kiely 0–1.		C Minihane 1–0, E Kiely 0–3, D Hennessy 0–2, S O'Neill 0–2, D Quigley 0–1.

5 August 2001 Round 2	Ballybrown	3–13 – 2–10	Ahane	Gaelic Grounds
	P Tiernan 1–3, J Shanahan 0–5, S Kiely 1–1, P Hartigan 1–0, N Doolin 0–2, P McCarthy 0–2.		J Moran 0–6, T Herbert 1–2, C O'Reilly 1–1, D O'Sullivan 0–1.

11 August 2001 Round 3	Garryspillane	2–12 – 0–13	Ahane	FitzGerald Park
	C Hickey 1–2, R Sampson 1–1, F Carroll 0–4, M O'Donnell 0–2, TJ Ryan 0–1, M O'Dea 0–1, M O'Brien 0–1.		T Herbert 0–5, J Meskell 0–3, N Moran 0–2, J Moran 0–2, C O'Reilly 0–1.

12 August 2001 Round 3	Na Piarsaigh	2–15 – 1–09	Ballybrown	Gaelic Grounds
	D Quigley 2–3, E Kiely 0–9, J Cormack 0–3, C Sherlock 0–1.		J Shanahan 0–5, P Tiernan 1–0, P Hartigan 0–2, N Doolin 0–2.

== Relegation stage ==
=== Relegation semi-finals ===
1 September 2001 Semi-final	Ahane	0–16 – 2–11	Hospital-Herbertstown	Cappamore Grounds
	T Herbert 0–6, O Moran 0–5, J Moran 0–2, J Meskell 0–2, B Healy 0–1.		I McCaffrey 2–0, D Reale 0–3, D Carroll 0–2, L Garvey 0–2, P Reale 0–2, J Allen 0–1, C O'Donoghue 0–1.

9 September 2001 Semi-final	Claughaun	0–12 – 1–11	Cappamore	Bruff Grounds
	M Galligan 0–3, K Holmes 0–3, L O'Connor 0–3, I McNamara 0–2, A Kerley 0–1.		N Hayes 0–7, S O'Dwyer 1–2, L Cronin 0–1, D O'Dwyer 0–1.

=== Relegation final ===
16 October 2001 Final	Claughaun	3–05 – 1–17	Ahane	Fr Hayes Memorial Park
	L O'Connor 1–3, K Holmes 1–0, F Hogan 1–0, T McGarry 0–1, P McGarry 0–1.		J Moran 1–7, T Herbert 0–8, N Moran 0–1, O Moran 0–1,

== Knockout stage ==
=== Quarter-finals ===
2 September 2001 Quarter-final	Patrickswell	1–13 – 1–11	Doon	FitzGerald Park
	B Foley 0–4, P O'Grady 1–0, G Kirby 0–3, D O'Grady 0–3, E Foley 0–2, A Carmody 0–1.		B McLoughlin 1–1, M McKenna 0–3, E Stapleton 0–2, B Crowe 0–2, P Coleman 0–2, F Kennedy 0–1.

2 September 2001 Quarter-final	Adare	1–13 – 1–12	Kilmallock	Gaelic Grounds
	B Heffernan 1–1, C Fitzgerald 0–4, J Foley 0–2, S Lavin 0–2, D Sheehan 0–1, B Foley 0–1, C Murphy 0–1.		P Tobin 1–2, M Houlihan 0–5, A O'Shaughnessy 0–3, J Fitzgerald 0–1, P Connery 0–1.

2 September 2001 Quarter-final	Na Piarsaigh	0–17 – 1–11	Bruree	Bruff Grounds
	E Kiely 0–7, D Hennessy 0–4, A Ryan 0–2, J Cormack 0–1, D Quigley 0–1, B O'Dwyer 0–1, R Hennessy 0–1.		S O'Connell 0–6, E Potter 1–0, R Fenton 0–1, J O'Brien 0–1, JV O'Brien 0–1, C O'Shea 0–1, JP Potter 0–1.

23 September 2001 Quarter-final	Garryspillane	1–17 – 3–08	Murroe/Boher	Bruff Grounds
	F Carroll 0–8, M O'Brien 1–1, P Tobin 0–4, Donie Ryan 0–2, TJ Ryan 0–1, M O'Donnell 0–1.		O O'Neill 2–2, J Butler 1–0, K Tobin 0–2, D Brouder 0–2, C Brouder 0–1, J O'Connor 0–1.

=== Semi-finals ===
30 September 2001 Semi-final	Adare	0–17 – 0–11	Na Piarsaigh	Gaelic Grounds
	C Fitzgerald 0–7, C Murphy 0–2, S Lavin 0–2, B Heffernan 0–2, J Foley 0–1, T Healy 0–1, D Sheehan 0–1, B Foley 0–1.		E Kiely 0–5, D Hennessy 0–2, D Quigley 0–1, J Cormack 0–1, A Ryan 0–1, S O'Neill 0–1.

30 September 2001 Semi-final	Patrickswell	2–14 – 3–09	Garryspillane	Gaelic Grounds
	D O'Grady 1–1, G Kirby 0–4, B Foley 1–0, P O'Grady 0–3, T O'Brien 0–2, W Morrissey 0–1, P Carey 0–1, A Carmody 0–1, B Geoghegan 0–1.		B Carroll 1–5, C Hickey 1–1, M O'Brien 1–0, TJ Ryan 0–2, D Ryan 0–1.

=== Final ===
21 October 2001 Final	Adare	2–17 – 2–08	Patrickswell	Gaelic Grounds
	C Fitzgerald 0–7, B Foley 1–1, B Heffernan 1–0, M Foley, C Murphy, D Sheehan 0–2 each, J Foley S Lavin 0–1 each.		C Carey 0–4, E Foley 0–3, B Foley and A Carmody 1–0 each, N O'Callaghan 0–1.

== Championship statistics ==
=== Top scorers ===
Rank	Player	Club	Tally	Total	Matches	Average
1	Frankie Carroll	Garryspillane	3–30	39	5	7.80
2	Conor Fitzgerald	Adare	0–36	36	6	6.00
3	Séamus O'Connell	Bruree	4–23	35	4	8.75
4	Mike Galligan	Claughaun	1–28	31	5	6.16
5	Owen O'Neill	Murroe/Boher	6–10	28	4	6.50
6	Gary Kirby	Patrickswell	1–24	27	6	4.83
7	Liam Garvey	Hospital-Herbertstown	6–08	26	4	6.50
7	Shane Mullane	Monaleen	2–20	26	4	6.50
9	Turlough Herbert	Ahane	1–21	24	5	4.80
9	Enda Kiely	Na Piarsaigh	1–21	24	5	4.80
