= Gary Kirby =

Irish hurler and manager

Personal information
- Native name: Gearóid Ó Ciarba (Irish)
- Nickname: Colgate
- Born: 12 January 1967 (age 59) Patrickswell, County Limerick, Ireland
- Occupations: Sales and marketing
- Height: 6 ft 0 in (183 cm)

Sport
- Sport: Hurling
- Position: Centre-forward
Club
Years	Club	Apps (scores)
1984–2003	Patrickswell	116 (54-696)
Club titles
- Limerick titles: 10
- Munster titles: 2
- All-Ireland Titles: 0
Inter-county*
Years	County	Apps (scores)
1987–1999	Limerick	30 (9–165)
Inter-county titles
- Munster titles: 2
- All-Irelands: 0
- NHL: 2
- All Stars: 4
- *Inter County team apps and scores correct as of 16:10, 31 May 2018.

Gary Kirby (born 12 January 1967 in Patrickswell, County Limerick, Ireland) is an Irish hurling manager and former player. He was named in a list of the "125 greatest stars of the GAA" in 2009, in which he was described as "one of the best players never to win an All-Ireland senior medal". As a centre-forward, his playing career at club level was with Patrickswell and at inter-county level with Limerick. He was a key member of the latter team during the resurgence of the 1990s and collected two Munster titles, two National Hurling League titles and four All-Star awards.

In retirement from playing Kirby has become involved in team management at all levels. He was a selector with the Limerick senior hurling team under Richie Bennis from 2006 until 2008, a period which saw Limerick qualify for the All-Ireland final in 2007. While Kirby has been touted as a possible future manager of Limerick, he has been in charge of the Patrickswell senior hurling team since 2008.

== Playing career ==
=== Club ===
Kirby played his club hurling with the famous Patrickswell team and enjoyed much success in a club career that spanned three decades. He first came to prominence on the club scene as a seventeen-year-old in 1984, when he starred on both the club's minor and senior teams. Furthermore, Kirby collected a minor county title while a defeat of Cappamore gave him his very first senior county championship winners' medal.

Three years later Kirby was a key member of the forwards as rivals Ballybrown provided the opposition in another county championship decider. 'The Well' narrowly took the title by 1-17 to 3-10 and Kirby collected his second winners' medal.

In 1988 Patrickswell contested the county championship decider for the second consecutive year. Cappamore provided the opposition; however, Patrickswell triumphed by ten points and Kirby added a third county title to his collection. Patrickswell later represented the county in the provincial series of games and even reached the final. The famous Mount Sion club provided the opposition; however, Patrickswell won by 3-13 to 2-13 and Kirby collected a Munster club winners' medal. Patrickswell's run of success came to an end in the All-Ireland semi-final when the O'Donovan Rossa GAC Belfast club defeated the Munster champions by a single point.

Patrickswell failed to make it three-in-a-row in 1989; however, the team bounced back the following year to defeat Adare and give Kirby a fourth county championship title. He later added a second Munster club title to his collection following a triumph over Éire Óg; however, he was back on the team for the All-Ireland final against Glenmore. The game was an exciting one; however, Patrickswell only held the lead on one occasion when Leonard Enright opened the scoring. A 1-13 to 0-12 score line gave Glenmore the title.

The next decade saw Patrickswell become the dominant force in club hurling in Limerick. Kirby won his fifth county championship title in 1993. He added to his haul of medals as Patrickswell won three county championships in-a-row in 1995, 1996 and 1997. This latter win was subsequently followed by another Munster final appearance. Clarecastle provided the opposition and eventually won the game by two points.

Four-in-a-row proved beyond Patrickswell; however, in 2000 a one-point defeat of Doon gave Kirby a ninth county championship winners' medal.

Defeat in 2001 was followed by a tenth county championship success for Kirby in 2003 when Adare were accounted for by two points. Patrickswell subsequently qualified for the Munster final; however, Cork champions Newtwonshandrum recorded a 2-18 to 2-9 victory.

Following nearly twenty years of service to Patrickswell, Kirby announced his retirement from club hurling in June 2004.

=== Minor & under-21 ===
Kirby first came to prominence on the inter-county scene as a member of the Limerick minor hurling team in the early 1980s. After losing nine provincial deciders since their last success in 1965, Kirby's minor team went into the 1984 Munster final as underdogs. Tipperary, the team that had beaten Limerick in the two previous deciders, provided the opposition once again. At the long whistle Limerick were the champions by 3-6 to 2-7 and Kirby collected a Munster minor winners' medal. Limerick later qualified for the All-Ireland final with Kilkenny providing the opposition. It was the very first meeting between these two sides in the minor championship. An exciting game developed, however, at the full-time whistle both sides were level and a replay was required. The second encounter between the two sides was a low-scoring tense affair; however, Limerick narrowly triumphed by 2-5 to 2-4 and Kirby collected an All-Ireland minor winners' medal.

Two years later Kirby was a key member of the Limerick under-21 hurling team. A Munster final appearance beckoned with near neighbours Clare providing the opposition. A close game developed and, at the end, both sides were level with 3-9 apiece. The subsequent replay was something akin to a walkover for Limerick. A 2-10 to 0-3 score line gave Limerick the win and gave Kirby a Munster winners' medal in the under-21 grade. Limerick, however, were later beaten in the All-Ireland semi-final.

In 1987 Limerick reached the provincial under-21 decider for a second successive year. Cork were the opponents on that occasion; however, Kirby collected a second Munster under-21 title following a 3-14 to 2-9 victory. An appearance in the All-Ireland final soon followed with reigning champions Galwayproviding the opposition. Limerick, however, proved unstoppable and powered to a 2-15 to 3-6 victory and an All-Ireland winners' medal.

=== Senior ===
Kirby made his senior championship debut for Limerick in 1987 at a time when the county team was in the doldrums. His first few seasons on the team ended with an early exit from the provincial championship, however, even though Limerick weren't enjoying much success Kirby was presented with his first All-Star award in 1991.

In 1992 Kirby's side qualified for the final of the National Hurling League. Reigning All-Ireland champions Tipperary provided the opposition and took an eight-point lead at half-time. Limerick battled back to claim a narrow 0-14 to 0-13 victory and Kirby collected his first National League winners' medal. The new league champions built on this momentum and subsequently qualified for a Munster final showdown with Cork. A high-scoring game developed; however, at the long whistle Cork were the champions by 1-22 to 3-11.

Limerick failed to reach the provincial decider the following year; however, in 1994 Kirby was captain as the team bounced back and qualified for the Munster final again. Provincial whipping boys Clare were the opponents and a rout took place. A 0-25 to 2-10 score line gave Limerick the win and gave Kirby his first Munster winners' medal. Limerick subsequently qualified to meet Offaly in the All-Ireland final. It looked as if Kirby's side were going to make history and claim the title as they had a five-point lead with as many minutes left. Offaly suddenly sprang to life following a Johnny Dooley goal from a close-in free. Following the puck-out Offaly worked the ball upfield and Pat O'Connor struck for a second goal. The Offaly forwards scored another five unanswered points in the time remaining to secure a 3-16 to 2-13 victory. It was a bitter blow for Limerick who looked as if they had one hand on the Liam MacCarthy Cup. In spite of the defeat Kirby was later presented with a second All-Star award.

Limerick surrendered their Munster title to Clare in 1995; however, Kirby picked up a third All-Star. The men from the Treaty county faced Tipperary in the provincial final the following year. All did not go to plan and looked to be heading out of the championship as Tipp took a ten-point lead. Kirby's side battled back to secure a 0-19 to 1-16 draw and a second chance to defeat their near rivals. The replay also saw Tipperary take a decisive lead; however, Limerick's goal-scoring ability was the deciding factor. A 4-7 to 0-16 score line gave Limerick the title and gave Kirby a second Munster winners' medal. The subsequent All-Ireland final pitted Limerick against Wexford for the first time in over forty years. The game was far from a classic; however, it did provide excitement. Tom Dempsey was the hero of the day as he scored a goal after nineteen minutes to give Wexford a major advantage. His side led by 1-8 to 0-10 at half-time in spite of having Éamonn Scallan sent off. Wexford took a four-point lead in the second-half; however, this was whittled back to two points as Wexford hung on for the last twenty minutes. The final score of 1-13 to 0-14 showed how vital Dempsey’s goal was. It was Limerick's second All-Ireland defeat in two years. Once again Kirby's individual skill was recognised when he collected his fourth All-Star award.

In 1997 Limerick defeated Galway by 1-12 to 1-9 to take the National League title. It was Kirby's second winners' medal in that competition. The recent All-Ireland defeats, however, seemed to have damaged the team as Limerick crashed out of the provincial championship at an early stage.

This process repeated itself over the next few years. Following Limerick's exit from the championship in 1999 Kirby decided to retire from inter-county hurling.

=== Honours ===
- Limerick Senior Hurling Championship (10): 1984, 1987, 1988, 1990, 1993, 1995, 1996, 1997, 2000, 2003
- 2 Munster Senior Club Hurling Championship (2): 1988, 1990
- 5 Limerick County Hurling League Division 1 1991 1995 1997 1999 2000
- 2 Railway Cup 1995 1996
- 2 Munster Senior Hurling Championship 1994 1996
- 2 National Hurling League 1992 1997
- 2 Munster Under-21 Hurling Championship 1986 1987
- 1 All-Ireland Under-21 Hurling Championship 1987
- 1 Munster Minor Hurling Championship 1984
- 1 Limerick Minor Hurling Championship 1984

Awards

- 4 GAA GPA All Stars Awards 1991 1994 1995 1996
- 1 Munster Senior Hurling Team 1984-2009

=== Inter-provincial ===
Kirby also had the honour of being selected for the Munster team in the inter-provincial series of games. He first lined out for his province in 1991 as Munster faced Connacht in the decider. That game ended in defeat for Kirby's side as the westerners won by 4-16 to 3-17.

After being omitted from the team for three years, Kirby was back on the team in 1994; however, Munster were defeated in the opening game. He was appointed captain in 1995 as the southerners qualified for the final. Ulster provided the opposition; however, Munster scraped a win by 0-13 to 1-9 and Kirby collected a Railway Cup winners' medal.

It was the beginning of a successful era for the province as Munster retained the title in 1996 with Kirby winning a second Railway Cup title in his last Railway Cup appearance.

== Management career ==
=== Limerick ===
In 2006 Limerick manager Joe McKenna suddenly resigned following the county's exit from the provincial championship. Richie Bennis was appointed manager on an interim basis while Kirby joined the management team as a selector. While Limerick hurling was at a low ebb the team still qualified for an All-Ireland quarter-final meeting with reigning All-Ireland champions Cork. A close game developed; however, at the full-time whistle Limerick lost out by a single point.

Bennis and his selection team remained in charge of Limerick again for the 2007 season, a season which turned out to be one of Limerick's best in many years. After a remarkable three-game sage with Tipperary in the Munster semi-final, the Treaty county qualified for their first provincial decider since 2001. Waterford provided the opposition; however, they were defeated on a score line of 3-17 to 1-14. These two sides later met again in the All-Ireland semi-final; however, the management and players masterminded a magnificent 5-11 to 2-15 victory over the Munster champions. This victory allowed Limerick to play Kilkenny in the championship decider. Unfortunately, Limerick got off to a bad start with goalkeeper Brian Murray letting in two goals by Eddie Brennan and Henry Shefflin in the first ten minutes. Limerick fought back; however 'the Cats' went on to win the game by seven points.

In 2008 Limerick failed to build on the relative success of the previous season. The team were beaten by 4-12 to 1-16 in opening game of the championship by Clare. The newly structured qualifier system pitted Limerick against Offaly in a must-win game. Limerick, however, were out of sorts as they suffered a surprising 3-19 to 0-18 defeat and were dumped out of the championship.

Following this defeat the management team's term in charge ended and, while there was some speculation that Kirby would succeed Richie Bennis as manager, the position went to Justin McCarthy instead.

=== Patrickswell ===
In December 2008 Kirby was appointed manager of the Patrickswell senior hurling team.

== Career statistics ==
Team	Year	National League			Munster		All-Ireland		Total	
Team	Year	Division	Apps	Score	Apps	Score	Apps	Score	Apps	Score
Limerick	1986-87	Division 1	8	5-09	3	1-01	—		11	6-10
Limerick	1987-88	Division 1	8	2-38	2	0-07	—		10	2-45
Limerick	1988-89	Division 1	6	2-35	2	1-10	—		8	3-45
Limerick	1989-90	Division 1	7	4-35	2	0-15	—		9	4-50
Limerick	1990-91	Division 1	2	0-08	2	0-15	—		4	0-23
Limerick	1991-92	Division 1A	7	4-38	2	2-12	—		9	6-50
Limerick	1992-93	Division 1A	8	5-32	1	0-03	—		9	5-35
Limerick	1993-94	Division 1	7	1-23	3	3-21	2	1-12	12	5-56
Limerick	1994-95	Division 1	6	1-26	2	0-18	—		8	1-44
Limerick	1995-96	Division 2	4	1-28	4	1-24	2	0-11	10	2-63
Limerick	1997	Division 1A	7	4-32	2	0-10	—		9	4-42
Limerick	1998	Division 1A	5	3-19	1	0-02	—		6	3-21
Limerick	1999	Division 1A	1	0-00	1	0-04	—		2	0-04
Total			76	32-323	27	8-142	4	1-23	107	41-488

Sporting positions
Preceded by	Limerick Senior Hurling Captain; 1994	Succeeded by Mike Houlihan
Preceded by Michael Coleman (Galway)	Railway Cup Hurling Final winning captain 1995	Succeeded by Anthony Daly (Clare)
