= Paul O'Grady (hurler) =

Irish hurler

Personal information
- Native name: Pól Ó Gráda (Irish)
- Born: 1979 (age 46–47) Patrickswell, County Limerick, Ireland

Sport
- Sport: Hurling
- Position: Right wing-forward
Club
- Years: Club
- Patrickswell
Club titles
- Limerick titles: 2
Inter-county
| Years | County | Apps (scores) |
| 2001-2006 | Limerick | 15 |
Inter-county titles
- Munster titles: 0
- All-Irelands: 0
- NHL: 0
- All Stars: 0

Paul O'Grady (born 24 August 1979) is an Irish former hurler. At club level, he played with Patrickswell and at inter-county level with the Limerick senior hurling team.

== Career ==
At club level, O'Grady first played for Patrickswell at juvenile and underage levels, and was part of the club's under-21 team that won consecutive Limerick U21AHC titles in 1996 and 1997. He progressed to the club's senior side and won his first Limerick SHC medal in 2000 after a 0–16 to 0–15 win over Doon in the final. O'Grady added a second Limerick SHC medal to his collection in 2003 after a win over Adare.

O'Grady first appeared on the inter-county scene with Limerick as a member of the minor team in 1997. He progressed to the under-21 team and won a Munster U21HC medal before later lining out in the 1–13 to 0–13 win over Galway in the 2000 All-Ireland under-21 final. O'Grady made his senior team debut in 2001. He made a number of appearances before leaving the team in 2006.

== Honours ==
Patrickswell

- Limerick Senior Hurling Championship: 2000, 2003
- Limerick Under-21 Hurling Championship: 1996, 1997

Limerick

- All-Ireland Under-21 Hurling Championship: 2000
- Munster Under-21 Hurling Championship: 2000
