= 2002 Limerick Senior Hurling Championship =

Annual hurling competition season

- Dates: 30 June – 13 October 2002
- Teams: 16
- Sponsor: AIB
- Champions: Adare (2nd title); Mark Foley (captain); Dave Keane (manager)
- Runners-up: Ahane
- Relegated: Hospital-Herbertstown

Tournament statistics
- Matches played: 34
- Goals scored: 103 (3.03 per match)
- Points scored: 774 (22.76 per match)
- Top scorer(s): Andrew O'Shaughnessy (5–29)

The 2002 Limerick Senior Hurling Championship was the 108th staging of the Limerick Senior Hurling Championship since its establishment by the Limerick County Board in 1887. The competition ran from 30 June to 13 October 2002.

Adare were the defending champions.

On 13 October 2002, Adare won the championship after a 0–14 to 0–12 defeat of Ahane in the final. It was their second championship title overall and their second title in succession.

Kilmallock's Andrew O'Shaughnessy was the championship's top scorer with 5–29.

== Team changes ==
=== To Championship ===
Promoted from the Limerick Intermediate Hurling Championship

- Knockainey

=== From Championship ===
Relegated to the Limerick Intermediate Hurling Championship

- Claughaun

== Group 1 ==
=== Group 1 table ===
Knockout stage Relegation stage

Team	Matches				Score			Pts
Team	Pld	W	D	L	For	Against	Diff	Pts
Ahane	3	2	0	1	54	48	6	4
Garryspillane	3	2	0	1	43	44	−1	4
Na Piarsaigh	3	1	1	1	50	45	5	3
Knockainey	3	0	1	2	39	49	−10	1

=== Group 1 results ===
14 July 2002 Round 1	Garryspillane	0–15 – 0–13	Knockainey	FitzGerald Park
	F Carroll 0–6, Donie Ryan 0–4, J Kiely 0–2, M O'Brien 0–1, Dave Ryan 0–1, M O'Donnell 0–1.		P Kirby 0–9, D O'Brien 0–2, G O'Shea 0–1, M Burke 0–1.

14 July 2002 Round 1	Na Piarsaigh	3–14 – 2–10	Ahane	Gaelic Grounds
	D Madigan 2–1, D Hennessy 0–6, P McNamara 0–5, S Laffan 1–0, E Moriarty 0–2.		N Moran 0–5, M Fitzgerald 1–1, J Moran 1–0, T Herbert 0–2, O Moran 0–1, C O'Reilly 0–1.

27 July 2002 Round 2	Ahane	1–15 – 0–13	Garryspillane	Gaelic Grounds
	J Meskell 0–5, N Moran 0–4, J Moran 0–4, D Givens 1–0, E Hannon 0–1, O Moran 0–1.		F Carroll 0–4, M O'Brien 0–3, J Kiely 0–2, TJ Ryan 0–1, D Ryan 0–1, C Hickey 0–1, P Hyland 0–1.

28 July 2002 Round 2	Na Piarsaigh	2–08 – 2–08	Knockainey	FitzGerald Park
	D Hennessy 0–5, D Quigley 1–1, J Fitzgerald 1–0, E Moriarty 0–1, F McNamara 0–1.		P Kirby 2–2, M Bourke 0–2, J Hartnett 0–1, D O'Brien 0–1, G O'Shea 0–1, M Ryan 0–1.

11 August 2002 Round 3	Garryspillane	0–15 – 1–10	Na Piarsaigh	FitzGerald Park
	F Carroll 0–10, M O'Brien 0–2, P Hyland 0–1, D Ryan 0–1, C Hickey 0–1.		D Hennessy 0–8, C Sherlock 1–0, D Quigley 0–1, P McNamara 0–1.

11 August 2002 Round 3	Ahane	0–20 – 1–09	Knockainey	Gaelic Grounds
	J Meskell 0–8, J Moran 0–6, P Ryan 0–1, C Smith 0–1, E Hannon 0–1, N Moran 0–1.		P Kirby 1–1, P Davern 0–1, M Ryan 0–1, B O'Shea 0–1, M Burke 0–1, T O'Connor 0–1.

== Group 2 ==
=== Group 2 table ===
Knockout stage Relegation stage

Team	Matches				Score			Pts
Team	Pld	W	D	L	For	Against	Diff	Pts
Croom	3	3	0	0	61	37	23	6
Bruree	3	2	0	1	56	39	17	4
Murroe/Boher	3	1	0	2	53	61	−8	2
Hospital-Herbertstown	3	0	0	3	33	66	−33	0

=== Group 2 results ===
14 July 2002 Round 1	Bruree	2–17 – 2–05	Hospital-Herbertstown	FitzGerald Park
	C O'Brien 0–8, S O'Connell 1–1, JV O'Brien 0–4, S Murphy 1–0, J O'Brien 0–3, B Hogan 0–1.		B Higgins 1–0, K Reale 1–0, PJ Garvey 0–3, D Reale 0–1, R O'Donovan 0–1.

16 July 2002 Round 1	Croom	3–17 – 3–08	Murroe/Boher	Gaelic Grounds
	P Lawlor 1–4, T Carmody 1–4, J Quirke 1–3, M Cregan 0–3, P Keyes 0–2, M Riordan 0–1, M Lenihan 0–1.		O O'Neill 2–4, P Tobin 1–1, P McNamara 0–2, J Butler 0–1.

28 July 2002 Round 2	Bruree	3–14 – 1–10	Murroe / Boher	Bruff Grounds

28 July 2002 Round 2	Croom	1–17 – 1–07	Hospital-Herbertstown	FitzGerald Park
	M Cregan 0–7, M Lenihan 1–0, M Cahill 0–5, P Lawlor 0–1.		PJ Garvey 1–2, D Reale 0–3, J McAuliffe 0–1.

10 August 2002 Round 3	Murroe/Boher	3–14 – 2–06	Hospital-Herbertstown	Fedamore Grounds
	P Tobin 1–4, J Butler 1–2, O O'Neill 0–5, T Lynch 1–0, D Brouder 0–2, C Brouder 0–1.		D Carroll 2–2, R O'Donovan 0–2, B Fenton 0–1, P Reale 0–1.

11 August 2002 Round 3	Croom	1–12 – 0–10	Bruree	Bruff Grounds
	M Cregan 1–5, P Lawlor 0–4, T Carmody 0–2, P Cahill 0–1.		C O'Brien 0–6, J O'Brien 0–3, S O'Connell 0–1.

== Group 3 ==
=== Group 3 table ===
Knockout stage Relegation stage

Team	Matches				Score			Pts
Team	Pld	W	D	L	For	Against	Diff	Pts
Kilmallock	3	3	0	0	67	39	28	6
Cappamore	3	1	1	1	40	47	−7	3
Ballybrown	3	0	2	1	42	44	−2	2
Monaleen	3	0	1	2	41	47	−6	1

=== Group 3 results ===
30 June 2002 Round 1	Kilmallock	6–13 – 0–09	Cappamore	Childers Road
	L Neenan 2–0, P Tobin 1–2, C O'Dwyer 1–2, M Houlihan 1–2, A O'Shaughnessy 0–5, S Burtell 1–1, P Connery 0–1.		N Hayes 0–6, D O'Dwyer 0–1, L Hammersley 0–1, R Hammersley 0–1.

14 July 2002 Round 1	Ballybrown	2–06 – 0–12	Monaleen	Gaelic Grounds
	J Shanahan 0–5, N Doolin 1–0, S Hayes 1–0, P Tiernan 0–1.		J Cormican 0–3, P Russell 0–3, B Geary 0–3, D Foley 0–1, A Kitson 0–1, A Larkin 0–1.

28 July 2002 Round 2	Cappamore	2–06 – 1–09	Ballybrown	Bruff Grounds
	N Hayes 2–3, B Coffey 0–1, S O'Dwyer 0–1, L Cronin 0–1.		J Shanahan 0–4, N Doolin 1–0, R Kenny 0–3, M Byrnes 0–1, G Crosse 0–1.

28 July 2002 Round 2	Kilmallock	2–10 – 1–09	Monaleen	Gaelic Grounds
	A O'Shaughnessy 1–5, C O'Dwyer 1–0, L Neenan 0–1, P Tobin 0–1, M Culhane 0–1, M Houlihan 0–1, C O'Dwyer 0–1.		P Russell 1–7, B Geary 0–1, J Cormican 0–1.

11 August 2002 Round 3	Ballybrown	2–12 – 4–08	Kilmallock	Gaelic Grounds
	A O'Connor 0–6, N Doolin 1–1, I Burke 1–1, B Hartigan 0–1, P Hartigan 0–1.		A O'Shaughnessy 2–5, L Neenan 2–2, J Fitzgerald 0–1.

11 August 2002 Round 3	Cappamore	3–10 – 2–11	Monaleen	Bruff Grounds
	N Hayes 0–8, R Hammersley 1–1, L Hammersley 1–0, S O'Dwyer 1–0, S Ryan 0–1.		P Russell 1–5, C Meeghan 1–0, B Geary 0–2, N Madden 0–1, S Mullane 0–1, J Cormican 0–1.

== Group 4 ==
=== Group 4 table ===
Knockout stage Relegation stage

Team	Matches				Score			Pts
Team	Pld	W	D	L	For	Against	Diff	Pts
Adare	3	3	0	0	53	34	19	6
Patrickswell	3	2	0	1	55	42	13	4
Doon	3	1	0	2	54	46	12	2
Killeedy	3	0	0	3	26	66	−40	1

=== Group 4 results ===
14 July 2002 Round 1	Patrickswell	1–17 – 0–12	Doon	Bruff Grounds
	P O'Grady 0–8, B Murray 1–1, W Morrissey 0–2, E Foley 0–2, T O'Brien 0–1, B Foley 0–1, D O'Grady 0–1, K Carey 0–1.		M McKenna 0–8, E Stapleton 0–1, D Stapleton 0–1, D Anderson 0–1, K McGrath 0–1.

16 July 2002 Round 1	Adare	0–15 – 0–08	Killeedy	Newcastle West Grounds
	C Fitzgerald 0–7, B Heffernan 0–2, S Lavin 0–2, T Houlihan 0–2, B Sexton 0–1, M Alfred 0–1.		D Flynn 0–3, P Cremin 0–2, D Cremin 0–2, J Magnier 0–1.

28 July 2002 Round 2	Adare	1–14 – 1–09	Doon	Gaelic Grounds
	C Fitzgerad 0–8, B Foley 1–0, J Foley 0–3, D Sheehan 0–2, B Sexton 0–1.		M McKennan 0–5, P Coleman 1–0, T Hayes 0–2, M Bradshaw 0–1, D Anderson 0–1.

28 July 2002 Round 2	Patrickswell	1–18 – 1–06	Killeedy	FitzGerald Park
	P O'Grady 0–5, D O'Grady 1–1, B Foley 0–4, C Carey 0–3, N O'Callaghan 0–3, K Carey 0–2.		J Kelleher 1–0, T Kelleher 0–2, J Kelleher 0–2, D Flynn 0–2.

10 August 2002 Round 3	Doon	6–12 – 1–06	Killeedy	FitzGerald Park
	D Stapleton 1–2, M Bradshaw 1–1, K McGrath 1–0, B Crowe 1–0, M McKenna 0–2, D Anderson 0–1, T Hayes 0–3, D Ryan 0–1.		J Kelleher 1–0, M Curtin 0–2, R Hayes 0–2, J Magnier 0–1, T Kelleher 0–1.

11 August 2002 Round 3	Adare	3–12 – 1–11	Patrickswell	FitzGerald Park
	C Fitzgerald 0–6, B Foley 1–1, M Foley 1–0, B Sexton 1–0, A O'Rahilly 0–2, M Alfred 0–1, C Murphy 0–1, D Sheehan 0–1.		E Foley 0–5, N O'Callaghan 1–0, K Carey 0–3, P O'Grady 0–2, C Carey 0–1.

== Relegation stage ==
=== Relegation semi-finals ===
18 August 2002 Semi-final	Monaleen	1–08 – 1–12	Killeedy	FitzGerald Park
	P Russell 0–4, C Megan 1–0, J Cormican 0–3, A Kitson 0–1.		R Cunningham 1–2, D Flynn 0–4, R Hayes 0–3, T Magner 0–1, P Cremin 0–1, T Kelleher 0–1.

31 August 2002 Semi-final	Hospital-Herbertstown	2–04 – 1–16	Knockainey	Bruff Grounds
	L Garvey 1–1, PJ Garvey 1–0, A Garvey 0–2, P Fitzgerald 0–1.		P Kirby 0–7, D O'Brien 1–1, M Ryan 0–2, P Madden 0–2, B O'Shea 0–1, M Burke 0–1, A Kirby 0–1, G O'Shea 0–1.

=== Relegation final ===
28 September 2002 Final	Monaleen	4–15 – 1–07	Hospital-Herbertstown	Cappamore Grounds
	P O'Halloran 2–1, A Kitson 1–3, P Russell 0–6, J Cormican 1–2, D Foley 0–1, B Geary 0–1, S Mullane 0–1.		M Fitzgerald 1–0, PJ Garvey 0–3, D Reale 0–3, A Garvey 0–1.

== Knockout stage ==
=== Quarter-finals ===
1 September 2002 Quarter-final	Kilmallock	3–16 – 0–17	Patrickswell	Gaelic Grounds
	A O'Shaughnessy 1–10, L Neenan 1–2, P Tobin 1–1, M Houlihan 0–3.	Report	P O'Grady 0–6, O Foley 0–4, B Foley 0–2, E Geary 0–2, C Carey 0–1, P O'Reilly 0–1, W Morrissey 0–1.

1 September 2002 Quarter-final	Ahane	2–15 – 1–05	Bruree	Gaelic Grounds
	N Moran 1–3, J Meskell 0–6, P Ryan 1–0, J Moran 0–3, O Moran 0–3.		P Sexton 1–0, C O'Brien 0–3, A Frawley 0–1, M O'Brien 0–1.

1 September 2002 Quarter-final	Croom	4–14 – 0–14	Garryspillane	FitzGerald Park
	M Cregan 2–2, H Flavin 1–2, P Reidy 1–1, P Lawlor 0–4, P Cahill 0–3, T Carmody 0–1, M Cahill 0–1.	Report	F Carroll 0–10, P Hyland 0–2, T O'Donnell 0–1, J Kiely 0–1.

1 September 2002 Quarter-final	Adare	1–13 – 2–05	Cappamore	FitzGerald Park
	C Fitzgerald 0–6, D Sheehan 1–0, B Hefferan 0–2, C Murphy 0–2, B Sexton 0–1, B Foley 0–1, A O'Rahilly 0–1.	Report	L Hammersley 1–0, E Bourke 1–0, R Hammersley 0–2, S O'Dwyer 0–1, D O'Dwyer 0–1, N Hayes 0–1.

=== Semi-finals ===
29 September 2002 Semi-final	Ahane	1–13 – 2–07	Kilmallock	Gaelic Grounds
	J Meskell 0–5 (0–4 frees); N Moran 0–3 (0–1 free); D Murrihy 1–0; J Moran 0–2; A Doherty, J O’Grady, C Smith, 0–1 each.	Report	A O’Shaughnessy 1–4 (0–4 frees); P Tobin 1–0; L Neenan, P Connery, M Houlihan (65), 0–1 each.

29 September 2002 Semi-final	Adare	0–17 – 1–08	Croom	Gaelic Grounds
	C Fitzgerald 0–6 (0–3 frees); B Sexton 0–4; D Sheehan 0–3; S Lavin 0–2; C Murphy 0–2.	Report	M Cregan 0–4 (0–3 frees); M Linehan 1–0; M Cahill 0–2; P Lawlor, P Cahill, 0–1 each.

=== Final ===
13 October 2002 Final	Adare	0–14 – 0–12	Ahane	Gaelic Grounds, Limerick
	C Fitzgerald 0–5, B Foley 0–3, M Foley, S Lavin, C Murphy, B Sexton, D Sheehan, B Heffernan 0–1 each.		J Meskell, J Moran 0–3 each, O Moran, N Moran, S O'Connor 0–2 each.

== Championship statistics ==
=== Top scorers ===
Rank	Player	Club	Tally	Total	Matches	Average
1	Andrew O'Shaughnessy	Kilmallock	5–29	44	5	8.80
2	Conor Fitzgerald	Adare	0–38	38	6	6.33
3	Peter Russell	Monaleen	2–25	31	5	6.20
4	Marcus Cregan	Croom	3–21	30	5	6.00
4	Frankie Carroll	Garryspillane	0–30	30	4	7.50
