= 1995 Limerick Senior Hurling Championship =

Annual hurling competition season

- Dates: 21 June – 1 October 1995
- Teams: 16
- Sponsor: PMG Steel
- Champions: Patrickswell (14th title); Ciarán Carey (captain); Phil Bennis (manager)
- Runners-up: Ballybrown; Joe Roche (captain); Seán Bennis (manager)
- Relegated: Feohanagh

Tournament statistics
- Matches played: 40
- Goals scored: 122 (3.05 per match)
- Points scored: 798 (19.95 per match)
- Top scorer(s): Gary Kirby (1–46)

The 1995 Limerick Senior Hurling Championship was the 101st staging of the Limerick Senior Hurling Championship since its establishment by the Limerick County Board in 1887. The championship ran from 21 June to 1 October 1995.

Kilmallock entered the championship as the defending champions, however, they were beaten by Patrickswell in the quarter-finals.

The final was played on 24 September 1995 at the Gaelic Grounds in Limerick, between Patrickswell and Ballybrown, in what was their third meeting in the final overall and a first meeting in the final in eight years. Patrickswell won the match by 2–19 to 0–08 to claim their 14th championship title overall and a first title in two years.

Patrickswell's Gary Kirby was the championship's top scorer with 1–46.

== Team changes ==
=== To Championship ===
Promoted from the Limerick Intermediate Hurling Championship

- Na Piarsaigh

=== From Championship ===
Relegated to the Limerick Intermediate Hurling Championship

- Hospital-Herbertstown

== Group 1 ==
=== Group 1 table ===
Knockout stage Relegation stage

Team	Matches				Score			Pts
Team	Pld	W	D	L	For	Against	Diff	Pts
Claughaun	3	2	0	1	55	54	1	4
Blackrock	3	2	0	1	61	43	18	4
Na Piarsaigh	3	1	0	2	47	36	11	2
Old Christians	3	1	0	2	30	60	−30	2

=== Group 1 results ===
21 June 1995 Round 1	Claughaun	3–15 – 4–10	Blackrock	Bruff Grounds
	M Galligan 0–10, L O'Connor 2–3, T McGarry 1–1, A Fitzgerald 0–1.		A Fitzgerald 2–4, P Heffernan 1–5, G O'Brien 1–0, K Fitzgerald 0–1.

21 June 1995 Round 1	Na Piarsaigh	1–17 – 1–03	Old Christians	Gaelic Grounds
	S O'Neill 0–6, D Quigley 1–2, S Laffan 0–4, A Delaney 0–3, D Hennessy 0–1.		E Butler 1–0, T Sheehan 0–1, P Butler 0–1, P Hourigan 0–1.

16 July 1995 Round 2	Blackrock	5–10 – 0–07	Old Christians	Fr Hayes Memorial Park
	A Fitzgerald 2–4, P Heffernan 2–3, E O'Sullivan 1–1, P McCarthy 0–1, K Fitzgerald 0–1.		J Brosnan 0–3, D Costello 0–2, T Sheehan 0–1, J Power 0–1.

16 July 1995 Round 2	Claughaun	1–13 – 1–12	Na Piarsaigh	Gaelic Grounds
	L O'Connor 1–3, M Galligan 0–4, M Ryan 0–2, D Gray 0–1, G Ryan 0–1, A Ryan 0–1, T McGarry 0–1.		C Shiels 1–1, S O'Neill 0–3, D Quigley 0–2, D Hennessy 0–2, A Ryan 0–2, S Laffan 0–1, O Moriarty 0–1.

23 July 1995 Round 3	Blackrock	2–08 – 1–09	Na Piarsaigh	Fr Hayes Memorial Park
	A Fitzgerald 1–2, J Quilty 1–1, P Heffernan 0–4, E O'Sullivan 0–1.		S O'Neill 1–3, D Quigley 0–3, E Moriarty 0–2, D Hickey 0–1.

23 July 1995 Round 3	Old Christians	2–11 – 3–06	Claughaun	Gaelic Grounds
	P Howard 1–8, D Maher 1–0, J Power 0–1, J Brosnahan 0–1, P Butler 0–1.		T McGarry 2–0, M Galligan 0–4, M Molyneaux 1–0, L O'Connor 0–1, D Gray 0–1.

== Group 2 ==
=== Group 2 table ===
Knockout stage Relegation stage

Team	Matches				Score			Pts
Team	Pld	W	D	L	For	Against	Diff	Pts
Ballybrown	3	3	0	0	56	36	20	6
Ahane	3	2	0	1	58	51	7	4
Bruff	3	1	0	2	47	54	−7	2
Feohanagh	3	0	0	3	34	54	−20	0

=== Group 2 results ===
21 June 1995 Round 1	Ahane	4–14 – 3–14	Bruff	Fr Hayes Memorial Park
	G Mulcahy 2–5, M Fitzgerald 1–2, J Morrissey 1–1, J Moran 0–3, J O'Grady 0–2, B Russell 0–1.		J Mulqueen 2–1, M Reale 1–4, T Coleman 0–3, B Finn 0–2, D Reale 0–2, T Moloney 0–1, A O'Riordan 0–1.

25 June 1995 Round 1	Feohanagh	2–06 – 4–10	Ballybrown	Bruff Grounds
	J Quaid 1–1, P Quaid 1–0, S Roche 0–2, S O'Keeffe 0–1, J Greaney 0–1, T Quaid 0–1.		N Doolin 2–3, P Mulqueen 1–1, C Coughlan 1–0, P Davoren 0–3, O O'Connor 0–2, D Stanners 0–1.

16 July 1995 Round 2	Ahane	1–17 – 3–04	Feohanagh	Bruff Grounds
	G Mulcahy 0–8, J O'Grady 1–3, M Fitzgerald 0–2, J Moran 0–2, B Russell 0–2.		T Quaid 2–2, M O'Brien 1–0, S Roche 0–1, S O'Keeffe 0–1.

16 July 1995 Round 2	Ballybrown	2–13 – 1–09	Bruff	FitzGerald Park
	P Davoren 0–6, S Hayes 1–0, E Shanahan 1–0, O O'Connor 0–2, T Hall 0–1, P Mulqueen 0–1, N Doolin 0–1, O Coughlan 0–1, J Roche 0–1.		T Coleman 1–0, M Reale 0–2, B Finn 0–2, A O'Dwyer 0–1, A O'Riordan 0–1, D Reale 0–1, S Mulqueen 0–1, P Moloney 0–1.

23 July 1995 Round 3	Bruff	1–09 – 0–09	Feohanagh	Ballyagran Grounds
				Referee: K Canty (Old Christians)

23 July 1995 Round 3	Ballybrown	2–09 – 1–09	Ahane	Gaelic Grounds
	P Coughlan 1–2, C Coughlan 1–1, P Davoren 0–4, J Roche 0–1, O O'Connor 0–1.		J Moran 1–2, M Fitzgerald 0–3, T Herbert 0–2, G Mulcahy 0–1, J Morrissey 0–1.

== Group 3 ==
=== Group 3 table ===
Knockout stage Relegation stage

Team	Matches				Score			Pts
Team	Pld	W	D	L	For	Against	Diff	Pts
Patrickswell	3	3	0	0	60	36	24	6
Adare	3	2	0	1	44	41	3	4
Killeedy	3	0	1	2	41	50	−9	1
Bruree	3	0	1	2	37	58	−21	1

=== Group 3 results ===
21 June 1995 Round 1	Adare	1–14 – 1–12	Killeedy	Ballingarry Grounds
	D Butler 1–0, S Fitzgibbon 0–3, M Foley 0–3, T Butler 0–3, A Howard 0–2, M Alfred 0–1, K Costello 0–1, T Healy 0–1.		K Kelly 0–6, J Kelleher 1–0, B Martin 0–2, T Magner 0–2, T Kelleher 0–1, M Murphy 0–1.

21 June 1995 Round 1	Patrickswell	6–08 – 3–06	Bruree	FitzGerald Park
	G Kirby 1–6, D O'Grady 2–0, E Geary 2–0, A Purcell 1–0, B Foley 0–2.		S O'Connell 2–4, E potter 1–0, D O'Keeffe 0–1, D McCarthy 0–1.

16 July 1995 Round 2	Patrickswell	0–20 – 3–04	Killeedy	FitzGerald Park
	G Kirby 0–8, B Foley 0–4, A Purcell 0–3, E Geary 0–3, F kirby 0–2.		K Kelly 1–3, G magnier 1–1, J Kelleher 1–0.

16 July 1995 Round 2	Adare	1–16 – 1–06	Bruree	Gaelic Grounds
	A Howard 1–3, S Fitzgibbon 0–4, M Foley 0–4, K Costelloe 0–2, J Foley 0–1, T Healy 0–1, M Alfred 0–1.		E Potter 1–2, M Sexton 0–2, S O'Connell 0–2.

23 July 1995 Round 3	Patrickswell	0–14 – 0–08	Adare	Bruff Grounds
	B Foley 0–5, G Kirby 0–4, A Carmody 0–2, S Kirby 0–2, A Purcell 0–1.		A Howard 0–3, M Foley 0–2, M Alfred 0–2, A Fitzgibbon 0–1.

23 July 1995 Round 3	Killeedy	0–13 – 0–13	Bruree	Ballyagran Grounds
				Referee: M O'Sullivan (St Kieran's)

== Group 4 ==
=== Group 4 table ===
Knockout stage Relegation stage

Team	Matches				Score			Pts
Team	Pld	W	D	L	For	Against	Diff	Pts
Doon	3	2	1	0	52	43	9	5
Kilmallock	3	2	1	0	36	30	6	5
South Liberties	3	1	0	2	40	48	−8	2
Cappamore	3	0	0	3	22	29	−7	0

=== Group 4 results ===
21 June 1995 Round 1	Kilmallock	1–14 – 1–14	Doon	Gaelic Grounds
	L Neenan 0–6, T Nelligan 1–2, P Dowling 0–3, A Clarke 0–1, M Houlihan 0–1, M Nelligan 0–1.		J Donovan 1–6, T Hayes 0–3, V McGrath 0–3, G McGrath 0–2.

21 June 1995 Round 1	South Liberties	0–13 – 1–07	Cappamore	Fr Hayes Memorial Park
	L Dooley 0–6, N Nash 0–3, K McAuliffe 0–2, M Nash 0–1, N Godfrey 0–1.		P Gleeson 1–1, D Mulcahy 0–3, P Creamer 0–1, M Gleeson 0–1, D O'DOnnell 0–1.

16 July 1995 Round 2	Doon	3–10 – 2–08	South Liberties	Fr Hayes Memorial Park
	P Coleman 2–1, J O'Donnell 0–5, G McGrath 1–0, T Hayes 0–2, V McGrath 0–1, J Anderson 0–1.		N Nash 2–1, L Dooley 0–5, M Nash 0–1, D Donnelly 0–1.

16 July 1995 Round 2	Kilmallock	w/o – scr.	Cappamore

23 July 1995 Round 3	Doon	3–07 – 1–09	Cappamore	Pallasgreen Grounds
	J O'Donovan 1–5, G McGrath 1–1, J Anderson 1–1.		D Mulcahy 0–6, M Lonergan 1–0, S O'Dwyer 0–1, P Gleeson 0–1.

23 July 1995 Round 3	Kilmallock	1–16 – 0–13	South Liberties	Fr Hayes Memorial Park
	L Neenan 0–12, M Cronin 1–2, M Nelligan 0–1, D Barry 0–1.		L Dooley 0–9, D Nash 0–2, N Nash 0–1, N Godfrey 0–1.

== Relegation stage ==
=== Relegation quarter-finals ===
12 August 1995 Quarter-final	Killeedy	1–11 – 4–12	Cappamore	FitzGerald Park

12 August 1995 Quarter-final	Bruree	1–15 – 1–04	South Liberties	Bruff Grounds

13 August 1995 Quarter-final	Na Piarsaigh	2–17 – 1–08	Feohanagh	FitzGerald Park

20 August 1995 Quarter-final	Old Christians	2–12 – 4–11	Bruff	Cappamore Grounds

=== Relegation semi-finals ===
27 August 1995 Semi-final	Feohanagh	1–08 – 1–10	Killeedy

27 August 1995 Semi-final	Old Christians	2–07 – 2–07	South Liberties	Gaelic Grounds

16 September 1995 Semi-final replay	Old Christians	2–11 – 0–06	South Liberties	Gaelic Grounds

=== Relegation final ===
1 October 1995 Final	Old Christians	1–09 – 1–06	Feohanagh	FitzGerald Park
	P Howard 0–5, J Power 1–1, P Foley 0–1, P Butler 0–1, T Sheehan 0–1.		P O'Brien 1–0, J Quaid 0–3, M Downes 0–1, J Greaney 0–1, T Quaid 0–1.

== Knockout stage ==
=== Quarter-finals ===
13 August 1995 Quarter-final	Ballybrown	5–06 – 4–03	Claughaun	Gaelic Grounds
	N Doolin 2–1, O O'Connor 1–1, P Mulqueen 1–0, C Coughlan 1–0, P Davoren 0–3, T Hall 0–1.		M Galligan 2–2, M Ryan 1–0, L O'Connor 1–0, G Ryan 0–1.

13 August 1995 Quarter-final	Adare	2–18 – 1–09	Doon	Gaelic Grounds
	T Howard 1–7, M Alfred 0–4, M Foley 1–0, V Foley 0–3, D Butler 0–2, J Foley 0–1, B Kennedy 0–1.		V McCarthy 1–3, S Ryan 0–2, P Coleman 0–1, J Anderson 0–1, D Ryan 0–1, J O'Donovan 0–1.

13 August 1995 Quarter-final	Patrickswell	1–18 – 1–14	Kilmallock	Gaelic Grounds
	G Kirby 0–9, N O'Grady 1–1, B Foley 0–3, A Purcell 0–2, S Carey 0–1, A Carmody 0–1, E Geary 0–1.		B Hanley 1–1, L Neenan 0–4, M Nelligan 0–3, P Tobin 0–2, M Houlihan 0–2, M Cronin 0–1, M Dowling 0–1.

13 August 1995 Quarter-final	Ahane	2–13 – 0–04	Blackrock	Fr Hayes Memorial Park
	G Mulcahy 2–4, J Moran 0–2, M Fitzgerald 0–2, J Morrissey 0–2, T Herbert 0–2, B Russell 0–1.		G O'Brien 0–1, P McCarthy 0–1, P Heffernan 0–1, A Fitzgerald 0–1.

=== Semi-finals ===
27 August 1995 Semi-final	Ballybrown	1–12 – 0–13	Adare	Gaelic Grounds
	N Doolin 1–2, P Davoren 0–5, O O'Connoe 0–2, K Roche 0–1, P Mulqueen 0–1, C Coughlin 0–1.		A Howard 0–7, M Foley 0–3, S Fitzgibbon 0–2, T Houlihan 0–1.

10 September 1995 Semi-final	Patrickswell	0–13 – 1–05	Ahane	FitzGerald Park
	G Kirby 0–7, A Carmody 0–2, N Carey 0–2, A Purcell 0–1, C Carey 0–1.		M Keane 1–0, G Mulcahy 0–2, T Herbert 0–2, J O'Grady 0–1.

=== Final ===
24 September 1995 Final	Patrickswell	2–19 – 0–08	Ballybrown	Gaelic Grounds
	G Kirby 0–12, N Carey 1–0, B Foley 0–2, D O'Grady 0–2, A Carmody 0–1, S Kirby 0–1, A Purcell 0–1.		P Davoren 0–4, T Kenny 0–3, O O'Connor 0–1.

== Championship statistics ==
=== Top scorers ===
Rank	Player	Club	Tally	Total	Matches	Average
1	Gary Kirby	Patrickswell	1–46	49	6	8.16
1	Ger Mulcahy	Ahane	4–20	32	5	6.40
3	Tony Howard	Adare	2–22	28	5	5.60
4	Aidan Fitzgerald	Blackrock	5–11	26	4	6.50
4	Mike Galligan	Claughaun	2–20	26	4	6.50
