= 1996 Limerick Senior Hurling Championship =

Annual hurling competition season

- Teams: 16
- Sponsor: PMG Steel
- Champions: Patrickswell (15th title); Pa Carey (captain); Phil Bennis (manager)
- Runners-up: Adare; Tony Moloney (manager)
- Relegated: South Liberties

Tournament statistics
- Matches played: 37
- Goals scored: 110 (2.97 per match)
- Points scored: 822 (22.22 per match)
- Top scorer(s): Gary Kirby (9–42)

The 1996 Limerick Senior Hurling Championship was the 102nd staging of the Limerick Senior Hurling Championship since its establishment by the Limerick County Board in 1887.

Patrickswell entered the championship as the defending champions.

The final was played on 3 November 1996 at the Gaelic Grounds in Limerick, between Patrickswell and Adare, in what was their third meeting in the final overall and a first meeting in the final in three years. Patrickswell won the match by 1–12 to 0–06 to claim their 15th championship title overall and a second title in succession.

Patrickswell's Gary Kirby was the championship's top scorer with 9–42.

== Team changes ==
=== To Championship ===
Promoted from the Limerick Intermediate Hurling Championship

- Pallasgreen

=== From Championship ===
Relegated to the Limerick Intermediate Hurling Championship

- Feohanagh

== Group 1 ==
=== Group 1 table ===
Knockout stage Relegation stage

Team	Matches				Score			Pts
Team	Pld	W	D	L	For	Against	Diff	Pts
Adare	3	3	0	0	52	44	8	6
Claughaun	3	2	0	1	55	40	15	4
Kilmallock	3	1	0	2	42	37	5	2
Old Christians	3	0	0	3	31	59	−28	0

=== Group 1 results ===
20 July 1996 Round 1	Kilmallock	0–11 – 1–09	Adare	Bruff Grounds
	M Houlihan 0–4, L Neenan 0–3, M Cronin 0–2, D Clarke 0–1, P Dowling 0–1.		T Healy 1–2, T Houlihan 0–2, C Murphy 0–1, G Butler 0–1, M Foley 0–1, M Alfred 0–1, B Heffernan 0–1.

20 July 1996 Round 1	Claughaun	2–15 – 0–07	Old Christians	Gaelic Grounds
	L O'Connor 1–8, M Galligan 1–1, T McGarry 0–3, P Moloney 0–1, D Holmes 0–1, A Fitzgerald 0–1.		P Howard 0–5, P Foley 0–1, G Hegarty 0–1.

14 September 1996 Round 2	Adare	3–10 – 1–15	Claughaun	FitzGerald Park
	M Foley 1–2, S Fitzgibbon 1–1, B Foley 1–0, C Murphy 0–2, T Butler 0–1, A Howard 0–1, J Foley 0–1, T Healy 0–1, T Houlihan 0–1.		M Galligan 0–6, D Fitzgerald 1–2, L O'Connor 0–4, T McGarry 0–2, D Holmes 0–1.

15 September 1996 Round 2	Kilmallock	2–11 – 0–09	Old Christians	Gaelic Grounds
	B Hanley 1–1, T Maguire 1–1, M Nelligan 0–3, M Houlihan 0–2, P Tobin 0–2, P Dowling 0–1, P Barrett 0–1.		P Howard 0–5, J Power 0–2, P Butler 0–1, G Hegarty 0–1.

22 September 1996 Round 3	Claughaun	0–16 – 2–08	Kilmallock	Gaelic Grounds
	M Galligan 0–11, L O'Connor 0–3, P Moloney 0–1, P Loughran 0–1.		M Houlihan 1–3, B Hanley 1–0, A McGuire 0–2, P Barrett 0–1, P Dowling 0–1.

22 September 1996 Round 3	Old Christians	2–09 – 2–15	Adare	Bruff Grounds
	P Howard 1–2, T Phayer 1–1, P Butler 0–2, P Keogh 0–2, J Brosnan 0–1, John Power 0–1.		M Foley 0–5, T Houlihan 1–1, S Fitzgibbon 1–1, B Butler 0–3, T Healy 0–2, B Kennedy 0–1, M Alfred 0–1, B Heffernan 0–1.

== Group 2 ==
=== Group 2 table ===
Knockout stage Relegation stage

Team	Matches				Score			Pts
Team	Pld	W	D	L	For	Against	Diff	Pts
Patrickswell	3	3	0	1	69	33	37	6
Blackrock	3	1	1	1	41	62	−21	3
Doon	3	1	0	2	46	51	−5	2
Killeedy	3	0	1	2	40	50	−10	1

=== Group 2 results ===
21 July 1996 Round 1	Doon	1–12 – 2–10	Blackrock	Bruff Grounds
	P Coleman 0–5, D Anderson 1–1, D Holmes 0–2, J O'Donovan 0–2, G McGrath 0–1, C Burke 0–1.		P Heffernan 2–3, A Fitzgerald 0–4, J O'Neill 0–2, P McGrath 0–1.

21 July 1996 Round 1	Patrickswell	2–12 – 1–06	Killeedy	FitzGerald Park
	A Carmody 0–4, N Carey 1–0, B Foley 1–0, D O'Grady 0–3, G Kirby 0–3, E Geary 0–1, Paul Carey 0–1.		T Magner 1–2, J Hayes 0–1, J O'Connor 0–1, J Kelleher 0–1, D Flynn 0–1.

15 September 1996 Round 2	Doon	1–13 – 2–09	Killeedy	Gaelic Grounds
	G McGrath 1–3, J O'Donovan 0–5, P Coleman 0–2, D Anderson 0–1, D Holmes 0–1, B Crowe 0–1.		J O'Connor 1–0, J Hayes 1–0, T Magner 0–5, J Magner 0–1, K Kelly 0–2, J Kelleher 0–1.

15 September 1996 Round 2	Patrickswell	3–22 – 1–06	Blackrock	Bruff Grounds
	N Carey 2–0, C Carey 0–5, B Foley 0–5, A Carmody 0–4, D O'Grady 0–4, E Geary 1–0, G Kirby 0–2, S Carey 0–1, A Purcell 0–1, P Carey 0–1.		P McGrath 1–0, P Heffernan 0–3, J O'Neill 0–1, M Holland 0–1, P McCarthy 0–1.

22 September 1996 Round 3	Doon	1–12 – 2–14	Patrickswell	FitzGerald Park
	P Coleman 0–6, B Crowe 1–1, G McGrath 0–2, J O'Donovan 0–1, K McGrath 0–1, D Anderson 0–1.		G Kirby 2–6, B Foley 0–5, C Carey 0–1, A Purcell 0–1, D O'Grady 0–1.

22 September 1996 Round 3	Blackrock	1–13 – 1–13	Killeedy	Ballyagran Grounds
				Referee: G Haugh (Monaleen)

== Group 3 ==
=== Group 3 table ===
Knockout stage Relegation stage

Team	Matches				Score			Pts
Team	Pld	W	D	L	For	Against	Diff	Pts
Bruree	3	3	0	0	54	31	23	6
Ahane	3	2	0	1	68	37	31	4
Ballybrown	3	1	0	2	40	53	−13	2
Pallasgreen	3	1	0	2	31	72	−41	2

=== Group 3 results ===
21 July 1996 Round 1	Ballybrown	1–08 – 1–13	Bruree	Bruff Grounds
	P Davoren 0–4, P Mulqueen 1–0, T Hall 0–2, N Doolin 0–2.		E Potter 1–4, S O'Connell 0–4, J O'Brien 0–2, P Potter 0–2, S McDonagh 0–1.

21 July 1996 Round 1	Ahane	5–15 – 1–09	Pallasgreen	Fr Hayes Memorial Park
	M Fitzgerald 3–3, T Meskell 1–1, G Mulcahy 0–4, M Keane 1–0, T Herbert 0–3, J Morrissey 0–2, J O'Grady 0–2.		C O'Brien 1–3, N Gammell 0–2, J Carr 0–1, P Cosgrove 0–1, B Roche 0–1, J Cosgrove 0–1.

15 September 1996 Round 2	Ahane	3–14 – 1–06	Ballybrown	FitzGerald Park
	G Mulcahy 1–10, J Moran 1–3, T Mescall 1–0, T Herbert 0–1.

15 September 1996 Round 2	Bruree	2–16 – 0–05	Pallasgreen	Gaelic Grounds
	J O'Brien 0–3, S O'Connell 0–4, P Finn 1–0, S McDonagh 0–1, S Murphy 1–4, M Sexton 0–1, M Mullane 0–2, D McCarthy 0–1,		M Kirby 0–3, B Roche 0–1.

22 September 1996 Round 3	Ahane	1–12 – 1–13	Bruree	Gaelic Grounds
	G Mulcahy 0–6, TJ Collins 1–0, T Mescall 0–2, J Morrissey 0–2, J Moran 0–1, M Fitzgerald 0–1.		S O'Connell 0–6, D Deady 1–1, S O'Halloran 0–2, S McDonagh 0–2, J O'Brien 0–1.

22 September 1996 Round 3	Pallasgreen	1–11 – 1–17	Ballybrown	Bruff Grounds
	N Gammell 0–4, G Gammell 1–0, G O'Connell 0–3, M Kirby 0–2, J Hourigan 0–1, B Roche 0–1.		P Davoren 0–6, S Hayes 1–0, P O'Connor 0–3, C Coughlan 0–3, P Coughlan 0–3, N Doolin 0–1, T Hall 0–1.

== Group 4 ==
=== Group 4 table ===
Knockout stage Relegation stage

Team	Matches				Score			Pts
Team	Pld	W	D	L	For	Against	Diff	Pts
Na Piarsaigh	3	3	0	0	62	42	20	6
Cappamore	3	2	0	1	60	52	8	4
Bruff	3	0	1	2	45	60	−15	1
South Liberties	3	0	1	2	43	56	−13	1

=== Group 4 results ===
20 July 1996 Round 1	Bruff	1–08 – 2–14	Na Piarsaigh	FitzGerald Park
	J Mulqueen 1–1, B Finn 0–4, D Reale 0–2, M Reale 0–1.		D Hennessy 0–6, P Beary 1–1, B Hartnett 1–0, D Quigley 0–3, A Ryan 0–2, D Hickey 0–1, J Cormack 0–1.

21 July 1996 Round 1	Cappamore	3–10 – 2–07	South Liberties	Fr Hayes Memorial Park
	S O'Dwyer 1–1, S Lynch 1–1, P Gleeson 1–1, N Hayes 0–3, T Mulcahy 0–2, A Murphy 0–1, M Gleeson 0–1.		B Kenny 1–1, A Shanahan 0–4, J Nash 1–0, D Nash 0–1, N Nash 0–1.

15 September 1996 Round 2	Na Piarsaigh	1–15 – 2–08	Cappamore	Fr Hayes Memorial Park
	D Quigley 1–4, D Hennessy 0–7, B Hartnett 0–2, S Laffan 0–1, P Beary 0–1.		T Mulcahy 2–7, M Gleeson 0–1.

15 September 1996 Round 2	South Liberties	2–07 – 1–10	Bruff	FitzGerald Park
	D Nash 0–5, B Hartigan 1–0, N Nash 0–2.		T Coleman 1–0, B Finn 0–3, J Browne 0–2, J Hogan 0–2, M O'Hara 0–1, D Reale 0–1, J O'Riordan 0–1.

22 September 1996 Round 3	Na Piarsaigh	0–24 – 3–08	South Liberties	FitzGerald Park
	D Hennessy 0–7, D Quigley 0–5, S Laffan 0–3, J Cormack 0–3, S O'Neill 0–2, O Moriarty 0–2, B Hartnett 0–1, A Ryan 0–1.		M Nash 1–2, B Hartigan 1–1, J Nash 1–0, D Nash 0–3, A Shanahan 0–1, M Nash 0–1.

22 September 1996 Round 3	Bruff	3–12 – 4–15	Cappamore	Fr Hayes Memorial Park
	B Finn 1–3, A O'Riordan 1–3, J Browne 1–1, J Wallace 0–3, M O'Hara 0–2.		P Gleeson 3–0, T Mulcahy 0–7, M Gleeson 1–1, M Doherty 0–3, D O'Donnell 0–2, D Mulcahy 0–1, S O'Dwyer 0–1.

=== Group 4 playoff ===
29 September 1996 Playoff	Bruff	0–08 – 0–05	South Liberties	Gaelic Grounds

== Relegation stage ==
=== Relegation semi-finals ===
13 October 1996 Semi-final	Old Christians	2–08 – 2–08	Killeedy	Bruff

13 October 1996 Semi-final	South Liberties	1–06 – 1–16	Pallasgreen	Gaelic Grounds

20 October 1996 Semi-final replay	Old Christians	1–06 – 1–09	Killeedy	Seán Finn Park
	G Hegarty 1–2, P Howard 0–2, P Foley 0–1, J Power 0–1.		T Magner 1–0, J Magner 0–2, J Hayes 0–2, K Kelly 0–2, R Cunningham 0–2, R Hayes 0–1.

=== Relegation final ===
3 November 1996 Final	South Liberties	0–08 – 1–10	Old Christians	Bruff Grounds

== Knockout stage ==
=== Quarter-finals ===
29 September 1996 Quarter-final	Patrickswell	2–14 – 1–14	Claughaun	Gaelic Grounds
	G Kirby 1–7, E Geary 1–1, A Carmody 0–2, C Carey 0–2, D O'Grady 0–1, B Foley 0–1.		M Galligan 1–5, L O'Connor 0–4, D Fitzgerald 0–2, M Ryan 0–1, A Fitzgerald 0–1, M Graham 0–1.

29 September 1996 Quarter-final	Bruree	1–11 – 2–05	Cappamore	Gaelic Grounds
	E Potter 1–7, J O'Brien 0–2, M Sexton 0–1, M Mullane 0–1.		P Gleeson 1–1, S Lynch 1–0, T Mulcahy 0–3, S O'Dwyer 0–1.

29 September 1996 Quarter-final	Na Piarsaigh	2–13 – 1–13	Ahane	FitzGerald Park
	D Hennessy 1–7, D Quigley 1–1, S Laffan 0–3, D Hickey 0–1, S O'Neill 0–1.		G Mulcahy 0–7, J Morrissey 1–0, J Moran 0–3, O Moran 0–1, J O'Grady 0–1, M Fitzgerald 0–1.

29 September 1996 Quarter-final	Adare	2–18 – 3–06	Blackrock	Bruff Grounds
	T Butler 2–2, T Houlihan 0–6, J Foley 0–3, B Heffernan 0–2, D Butler 0–2, M Foley 0–1, C Murphy 0–1.		A Fitzgerald 1–1, J Quilty 1–1, M Holland 1–0, P McCarthy 0–2, P Heffernan 0–1, J O'Neill 0–1.

=== Semi-finals ===
20 October 1996 Semi-final	Patrickswell	2–16 – 1–15	Na Piarsaigh	Gaelic Grounds
	G Kirby 2–10, A Purcell 0–3, C Carey 0–1, N Carey 0–1, A Carmody 0–1.		D Hennessy 1–8, B Hartnett 0–2, D Quigley 0–1, S Laffan 0–1, J Cormack 0–1, S O'Neill 0–1, P Beary 0–1.

20 October 1996 Semi-final	Adare	1–09 – 1–08	Bruree	Gaelic Grounds
	M Foley 1–3, T Houlihan 0–2, S Fitzgibbon 0–2, B Heffernan 0–1, E Fitzgerald 0–1.		E Potter 1–2, S O'Connell 0–3, J O'Brien 0–2, D McCarthy 0–1.

=== Final ===
27 October 1996 Final	Patrickswell	3–12 – 3–12	Adare	Gaelic Grounds
	G Kirby 3–8, A Purcell 0–2, B Foley 0–1, A Carmody 0–1.		S Fitzgibbon 2–0, T Houlihan 0–6, B Heffernan 1–1, C Murphy 0–2, J Foley 0–1, M Alfred 0–1, M Foley 0–1.

3 November 1996 Final replay	Patrickswell	1–12 – 0–06	Adare	Gaelic Grounds
	G Kirby 1–6, J McDermott 0–2, C Carey 0–1, B Foley 0–1, A Purcell 0–1, E Geary 0–1.		M Foley 0–2, T Houlihan 0–2, M Alfred 0–1, B Heffernan 0–1.

== Championship statistics ==
=== Top scorers ===
Rank	Player	Club	Tally	Total	Matches	Average
1	Gary Kirby	Patrickswell	9–42	63	7	9.00
2	Dave Hennessy	Na Piarsaigh	2–35	41	5	8.20
3	Ger Mulcahy	Patrickswell	1–27	30	4	7.50
4	Mike Galligan	Claughaun	2–23	29	4	7.25
5	Tony Mulcahy	Cappamore	2–19	25	4	6.25
6	Tony Houlihan	Adare	1–20	23	7	3.28
7	Leo O'Connor	Claughaun	1–19	22	4	5.50
8	Edward Potter	Bruree	3–12	21	3	7.00
8	Mark Foley	Adare	2–15	21	7	3.00
10	Damien Quigley	Na Piarsaigh	2–14	20	5	4.00
