= Galbally GAA =

Gaelic sports club in County Limerick, Ireland

Galbally
- Gallbhaile
- Founded: 1905
- County: Limerick
- Colours
- Grounds: Cussen Memorial Park

Playing kits
Standard colours

Senior Club Championships
| | All Ireland | Munster champions | Limerick champions |
|---|---|---|---|
| Football: | 0 | 0 | 2 |

Galbally GAA is a Gaelic Athletic Association club in Galbally, County Limerick, Ireland. The club, based at Cussen Memorial Park is exclusively concerned with the game of Gaelic football, but previously fielded teams in hurling.

== History ==
Located in the village of Galbally, on the Limerick–Tipperary border, Galbally GAA Club was founded in 1905. The club has spent most of its existence operating in the junior grade, however, there have also been periods where the club lapsed for a number of reasons.

Galbally had its first major success when, in 1968, the club claimed the Limerick JAFC title. Further success followed in 1990, when Galbally won the Limerick IFC title and secured senior status for the first time. Four years later the club claimed its inaugural Limerick SFC title, after a 3–17 to 1–13 win over Fr Casey's. A second Limerick SFC followed three years later, when Galbally were awarded the title following an objection after University of Limerick won the title on the field of play.

The club fielded a hurling team between 1982 and 2000, and won the Limerick JBHC title in 1995. Further Limerick IFC titles were won in 2010 and 2018.

== Honours ==
- Limerick Senior Football Championship (2): 1994, 1997
- Limerick Intermediate Football Championship (3): 1990, 2010, 2018
- Limerick Junior A Football Championship (1): 1968
- Limerick Junior B Hurling Championship (1): 1995

== Notable players ==
- John Kiely: All-Ireland SHC–winning manager (2018, 2020, 2021, 2022, 2023)
