= Pat O'Connor (hurler) =

Irish hurler

Personal information
- Native name: Pádraig Ó Conchúir (Irish)
- Born: 1965 (age 60–61) Coolderry, County Offaly, Ireland
- Occupation: Farmer
- Height: 6 ft 1 in (185 cm)

Sport
- Position: Full-forward
Club
- Years: Club
- 1982-2004: Coolderry
Club titles
- Offaly titles: 2
Inter-county
Years	County	Apps (scores)
1984-1997	Offaly	15 (2-5)
Inter-county titles
- Leinster titles: 5
- All-Irelands: 1
- All Stars: 0
	Football	Hurling
League titles		1

Pat O'Connor (born 1965 in Coolderry, County Offaly) is an Irish retired sportsperson. He played hurling with his local club Coolderry and was a member of the Offaly senior inter-county team from 1987 until 1996.
