= Old Christians GAA Club =

Gaelic games club in County Limerick, Ireland

Old Christians
- Seán Chríostaithe
- Founded: 1962
- County: Limerick
- Nickname: Christians
- Colours: Black and Red

Playing kits
Standard colours

Senior Club Championships
	All Ireland	Munster champions	Limerick champions
Football:	-	-	1
Hurling:	-	-	0

Old Christians GAA club is a Gaelic Athletic Association club in Limerick, Ireland. It was formed in 1962 for the development of the games of hurling and Gaelic football in the southern part of Limerick city. Since then, the club has gone on to develop a number of league and championship winning teams at all level and has contributed a number of players to Limerick County teams. These include Bernie Hartigan, who won an All-Ireland Senior Hurling Championship with Limerick in 1973, and Ger Hegarty, who won a Munster title and a National Hurling League medal in the mid-1990s.

== Location ==
The club is centred on Our Lady Queen of Peace parish which is a working-class parish on the southside of Limerick City. Its players also come from Our Lady of Lourdes and Holy Family parishes. The main areas that provide players include Rathbane, Janesboro, Kennedy Park, Prospect, Ballinacurra Weston, Roxboro and Southill.

== History ==
Prior to the foundation of the club, sportsmen of the area played with South Liberties GAA or other city clubs such as the Commercials, Young Irelanders or Claughaun GAA. The club was originally set up in 1962 both to provide a GAA club for past pupils of Sexton Street CBS - hence the name 'Old Christians' whilst also helping to promote and foster hurling and Gaelic football on the southside of Limerick city in an area where rugby and in particular soccer are extremely popular. Though they won the 1962 Limerick Senior Football Championship in their first year with victory over Claughaun and went on to win both Minor County Championships in hurling and football in 1966.

The clubs main concern was and has been hurling ever since, with their under-14 team winning the All-Ireland Féile na nGael title in 1972 beating Nenagh Éire Óg GAA in the final. They continued to hurl at a senior level up to the mid 1970s when the club went into decline as Sexton Street CBS began to decline in its prominence as a hurling nursery meaning less and less past pupils went on to play for 'Christians'.

The 1980s saw a revival, and the club won several underage city and county titles. The minor hurlers reached the county final in 1984 under the Southill/Old Christians name. Old Christians won the 1992 County Intermediate Hurling Championship, but they struggled to compete at senior level and were often fought relegation. They were eventually relegated to the intermediate grade in 1999, and they were back to playing junior A by 2007. At the underage level, they have won several county titles, including the County Under-14 A Football title in 2013. At adult level, they field a Junior A hurling team, but the club is without football team with sister club Ballinacurra Gaels catering for the area's football.

The club has struggled again in recent years but once again Christians appear to be rebuilding. In 2023 they won promotion to the Limerick Junior A Premier hurling championship, the fifth tier of Limerick club hurling. Christian's have also amalgamated with local junior clubs St Patrick's and Claughaun at underage under the umbrella name of Southside Gaels.

== Grounds ==
Old Christians have been playing at various locations around the Rathbane area since their foundation in 1962. The club's original home was Cannon Punch Park on the Hyde Road in Ballinacurra Weston, currently Hyde Rangers FC grounds. The current club grounds, Rathbane playing fields were formerly used by the CBS for athletics, PE, and hurling. Christians bought the Rathbane site from Limerick City Council in the early 2000s and now have two full sized pitches along with a clubhouse containing a sports hall and gym and dressing rooms.

In 2022, the Rathbane playing pitches were renamed as Power Park in honour of the club's founding member John Power. Since then, Power Park become a venue for the Limerick Senior Football Championship on a number of occasions.

== Roll of Honour ==
Hurling

Limerick Intermediate Hurling Championship - 1991.

Limerick City Hurling Championship - 1999.

Limerick Minor Hurling Championship - 1966.

Gaelic Football

Limerick Senior Football Championship - 1962.

Limerick Minor Football Championship - 1966.

== Notable players ==
- Bernie Hartigan
- Ger Hegarty
