= Limerick Intermediate Football Championship =

- Current season or competition: 2024 Limerick Intermediate Football Championship
- Code: Gaelic football
- Founded: 1911; 114 years ago
- Region: Limerick (GAA)
- No. of teams: 12
- Title holders: Rathkeale (2nd title)
- First winner: Pallasgreen
- Sponsors: Griffin Coaches
- Official website: Official website

The Limerick Intermediate Football Championship (known for sponsorship reasons as the Griffin Coaches County Intermediate Football Championship and abbreviated to the Limerick IFC) is an annual Gaelic football competition organised by the Limerick County Board of the Gaelic Athletic Association and contested by intermediate clubs in the county of Limerick in Ireland. It is the second tier overall in the entire Limerick football championship system.

In its present format, the 12 participating teams are divided into two groups of six teams and play each other once in a round-robin system. The top three teams in each group proceed to the knockout phase that culminates with the final. The winner of the Limerick Intermediate Championship qualifies for the subsequent Munster Club Championship.

Rathkeale are the reigning champions, having beaten Galbally by 0–11 to 0–07 in the 2024 final.

== History ==
The Limerick Intermediate Football Championship dates back to 1911, with Pallasgreen becoming the first winners of that once-off competition. The championship was revived after 64 years in 1975 and Na Piarsaigh were the winners. After three years the championship saw another hiatus, this time until 1988, when Adare were the winners.

== Format ==
=== Group stage ===
The 12 teams are divided into two groups of six. Over the course of the group stage, each team plays once against the others in the group. Two points are awarded for a win, one for a draw and zero for a loss. The teams are ranked in the group stage table by points gained, then scoring difference and then their head-to-head record. the top three teams in each group qualify for the knockout stage, with the two group winners receiving byes to the semi-finals.

=== Knockout stage ===
Quarter-finals: The second and third placed teams from the group stage contest this round. The two winning teams advance to the semi-finals.

Semi-finals: The two quarter-final winners and the two top-ranked team from the group stage contest this round. The two winners from these games advance to the final.

Final: The two semi-final winners contest the final. The winning team are declared champions.

=== Promotion and relegation ===
At the end of the championship, the winning team is automatically promoted to the Limerick Senior Championship for the following season. The two bottom-ranked teams from the group stage participate in a playoff, with the losing team being relegated to the Limerick Premier Junior A Championship.

== Sponsorship ==
Griffin Coaches from Ardpatrick are the current sponsor of the championship.

== Qualification for subsequent competitions ==
The Limerick Intermediate Championship winners qualify for the subsequent Munster Intermediate Club Football Championship. The Limerick winners have reached the final on six occasions but have never won the provincial title.

== Roll of honour ==
#	Club	Titles	Years won
1	Mungret/St Paul's	3	1997, 2004, 2023
1	Na Piarsaigh	3	1997, 2004, 2022
1	Galbally	3	1990, 2010, 2018
1	Adare	3	1998, 2001, 2016
1	Pallasgreen	3	1911, 2005, 2012
6	Galtee Gaels	2	1993, 2019
6	St Senan's	2	2003, 2017
6	Athea	2	2002, 2007
6	Bruree	2	1994, 1996
6	Rathkeale	2	2013, 2024
11	Kildimo-Pallaskenry	1	2021
11	Claughaun	1	2020
11	oola	1	2015
11	Mountcollins	1	2011
11	St Patrick's	1	2009
11	Ballysteen	1	2008
11	Newcastle West	1	2006
11	Gerald Griffins	1	2000
11	Dromcollogher/Broadford	1	1999
11	Ballylanders	1	1998
11	Glin	1	1995
11	Askeaton	1	1992
11	Fr Caseys	1	1991
11	Hospital-Herbertstown	1	1989
11	Na Fianna	1	1977
11	Monaleen	1	1976

== List of finals ==
Year	Winners		Runners-up		Venue	#
Year	Club	Score	Club	Score	Venue	#
2024	Rathkeale	0-11	Galbally	0-07	Ballyagran Grounds	
2023	Mungret/St Paul's	1-08	Dromcollogher/Broadford	1-03	Páirc na nGael	
2022	Na Piarsaigh	2-08	Dromcollogher/Broadford	2-06	Páirc na nGael	
2021	Kildimo-Pallaskenry	2-10	Rathkeale	0-14	Mick Neville Park	
2020	Claughaun	0-10	Gerald Griffins	0-07	Newcastle West Grounds	
2019	Galtee Gaels	1-11	Gerald Griffins	0-12	LIT Gaelic Grounds	
2018	Galbally	1-06	Rathkeale	0-08	Gaelic Grounds	
2017	St Senan's	4-09	Galbally	2-08	Mick Neville Park	

Notes:

- 2019 – The first match ended in a draw: Gaeltee Gaels 1-08, Gerald Griffins 1-08.
