= 2019 Limerick Senior Football Championship =

Limerick S.F.C.
- Season: 2019
- Champions: Newcastle West
- Relegated: St. Senan's
- All Ireland SCFC: ???
- Winning Captain: Thomas Quilligan
- Man of the Match: Iain Corbett
- Winning Manager: Mike Quilligan
- Munster SCFC: Newcastle West
- Matches: 36

The 2019 Limerick Senior Football Championship is the 123rd edition of the Limerick GAA's premier club Gaelic football tournament for senior clubs in County Limerick, Ireland. 12 teams compete, with the winner representing Limerick in the Munster Senior Club Football Championship. The championship starts with a group stage and then progresses to a knock out stage.

Adare were the defending champions after they defeated Ballylanders in the 2018 final to claim their second S.F.C. crown, just one year after claiming their first. However the defence of their title and quest for "3-in-a-row" came undone at the semi-final stage when suffering defeat to Newcastle West.

This was Galbally's return to the top flight for the first time in four years after claiming the 2018 Limerick I.F.C. title. Galbally last won the I.F.C. in 2010 (their third title) and after spending four seasons in the senior ranks they were relegated in 2014 back to the I.F.C.

St. Senan's were relegated back to the I.F.C. for 2020 after spending just two seasons in the top-flight of Limerick club football when losing their Relegation Final to Drom-Broadford.

On 27 October 2019, Newcastle West claimed their fourth S.F.C. title and first in four years when defeating Oola 1-11 to 0-8 in the final at the Gaelic Grounds. Thomas Quilligan became the fourth Newcastle West captain to lift the Fr. Casey Cup while Iain Corbett claimed the "Man-of-the-Match" award for his performance.

== Team changes ==
The following teams have changed division since the 2018 championship season.

=== To S.F.C. ===
Promoted from 2018 I.F.C.

- Galbally - (Intermediate Champions)

=== From S.F.C. ===
Relegated to 2019 I.F.C.

- St. Patrick's

== Group stage ==
There are two groups of six teams called Group A and B. The 1st placed teams in Group A and B will automatically qualify for the semi-finals. The 2nd and 3rd placed teams in Groups A and B will qualify for the quarter-finals. The 6th placed teams in both groups will proceed to the Relegation Final to determine which three teams will suffer relegation.

=== Group A ===
Team	Pld	W	L	D	PF	PA	PD	Pts
Adare	5	5	0	0	91	51	+40	10
Fr. Casey's	5	4	1	0	71	56	+15	8
Ballysteen	5	3	2	0	83	53	+30	6
Ballylanders	5	2	3	0	57	78	-21	4
Monaleen	5	1	4	0	53	62	-9	2
St. Senan's	5	0	5	0	50	105	-55	0

Round 1:

- Fr. Casey's 2-17, 1-9 St. Senan's, 29/3/2019,
- Adare 3-10, 3-5 Monaleen, 30/3/2019,
- Ballysteen 3-13, 0-7 Ballylanders, 30/3/2019,

Round 2:

- Adare 0-12, 1-5 Fr. Casey's, 5/4/2019,
- Ballysteen 2-9, 0-7 Monaleen, 5/4/2019,
- Ballylanders 1-15, 0-12 St. Senan's, 6/4/2019,

Round 3:

- Monaleen 0-13, 0-4 St. Senan's, 26/7/2019,
- Adare 1-14, 1-9 Ballysteen, 26/7/2019,
- Fr. Casey's 2-11, 1-11 Ballylanders, 31/7/2019,

Round 4:

- Adare 2-20, 0-10 St. Senan's, 2/8/2019,
- Ballylanders 1-8, 0-10 Monaleen, 3/8/2019,
- Fr. Casey's 0-10, 0-9 Ballysteen, 4/8/2019,

Round 5:

- Ballysteen 2-19, 0-12 St. Senan's, 24/8/2019,
- Adare 1-14, 0-7 Ballylanders, 24/8/2019,
- Fr. Casey's 0-13, 1-6 Monaleen, 24/8/2019,

=== Group B ===
Team	Pld	W	L	D	PF	PA	PD	Pts
Oola	5	5	0	0	93	63	+30	10
Newcastle West	5	4	1	0	88	51	+37	8
St. Kieran's	5	3	2	0	93	76	+17	6
Na Piarsaigh	5	2	3	0	69	80	-11	4
Galbally	5	1	4	0	58	97	-39	2
Drom-Broadford	5	0	5	0	66	100	-34	0

Round 1:

- Newcastle West 1-20, 1-8 Drom-Broadford, 30/3/2019,
- Oola 5-7, 0-12 Galbally, 30/3/2019,
- St. Kieran's 2-16, 0-10 Na Piarsaigh, 2/4/2019,

Round 2:

- Oola 3-15, 0-12 Drom-Broadford, 5/4/2019,
- Newcastle West 2-15, 1-6 St. Kieran's, 6/4/2019,
- Na Piarsaigh 3-15, 0-9 Galbally, 7/4/2019,

Round 3:

- St. Kieran's 2-14, 1-16 Drom-Broadford, 25/7/2019,
- Newcastle West 1-12, 1-8 Galbally, 25/7/2019,
- Oola 2-11, 1-9 Na Piarsaigh, 30/7/2019,

Round 4:

- Galbally 2-11, 1-6 Drom-Broadford, 1/8/2019,
- Oola 3-8, 0-15 St. Kieran's, 2/8/2019,
- Newcastle West 3-8, 0-7 Na Piarsaigh, 4/8/2019,

Round 5:

- St. Kieran's 4-15, 1-6 Galbally, 25/8/2019,
- Na Piarsaigh 1-13, 1-12 Drom-Broadford, 25/8/2019,
- Oola 1-10, 1-9 Newcastle West, 25/8/2019.

== Relegation Final ==
The 6th placed teams in Groups A and B compete in the Relegation Final, with the loser suffering relegation to the 2020 I.F.C.

- Drom-Broadford 2-10, 1-9 St. Senan's, Newcastle West, 14/9/2019,

== Finals ==
The 1st placed teams in Groups A and B qualify for the semi-finals while the 2nd and 3rd placed teams in Groups A and B qualify for the quarter-finals.

=== Quarter-finals ===
- St. Kieran's 1-11, 0-7 Fr. Casey's, Newcastle West, 7/9/2019,
- Newcastle West 1-10, 1-7 Ballysteen, Rathkeale, 7/9/2019,

=== Semi-finals ===
- Newcastle West 2-10, 1-7 Adare, Rathkeale, 22/9/2019,
- Oola 2-9, 0-9 St. Kieran's, Gaelic Grounds, 27/9/2019,

=== Final ===
27 October 2019 Final	Newcastle West	1-11 – 0-8	Oola	Limerick
15:00 IST (UTC+1)				Venue: Gaelic Grounds
				Referee: Johnny Murphy

== Munster Senior Club Football Championship ==
The county champions, Newcastle Wes, faced Nemo Rangers away in the first round of the Munster Senior Club Championship. They lost narrowly by 3 points, almost catching the Cork champions off guard.

== Championship statistics ==
=== Miscellaneous ===
- Oola qualify for the final for the first time since 1980.
