= 2026 Limerick Senior Football Championship =

130th Limerick Senior Football Championship

Tournament details
- County: Limerick
- Province: Munster
- Year: 2026
- Sponsor: Irish Wire Products Ltd
- Date: 9 July 2026 - 1 November 2026
- Teams: 12
- Defending champions: Mungret St Paul's

Promotion/Relegation
- Relegated team(s): Ballylanders

Other
- Matches played: 38
- Website: Limerick GAA

The 2026 Limerick Senior Football Championship is the 130th edition of the Limerick GAA's premier club Gaelic football tournament for senior clubs in County Limerick, Ireland. 12 teams compete, with the winner going on to represent Limerick in the Munster Senior Club Football Championship. The championship begins with a group stage, and then progresses to a knock out stage.

Mungret St Paul's are the defending champions after defeating Newcastle West in the 2025 Limerick S.F.C final. It was their first ever senior title.

Askeaton-Ballysteen-Kilcornan returned to the senior grade after defeating St Senan's in the 2025 Limerick Intermediate Football Championship final. Na Piarsaigh replaced them after losing the relegation final to Ballylanders.

The draw for the group stage of the 2026 Limerick S.F.C took place on 20 January 2026.

== Championship Structure ==
The 2026 Limerick SFC begins with a group stage consisting of two groups, each with six teams. Last year's finalists are seeded into different groups. The top team in each group qualifies for the semi-finals. 2nd from each group play 3rd in each group in the quarter-finals. The 5th and 6th placed teams from each group play in a relegation play-off to see who will be relegated to the 2027 Limerick IFC.

== Team Changes ==
The following teams have changed division since the 2025 championship season:

=== To S.F.C. ===
Promoted from 2025 Intermediate Football Championship

- Askeaton-Ballysteen-Kilcornan - (Intermediate Champions)

=== From S.F.C. ===
Relegated to 2026 Intermediate Football Championship

- Na Piarsaigh

== Participating teams ==
The teams that are competing in the 2026 Limerick S.F.C are:

Club	Location	Manager(s)	2025 Championship Position	2026 Championship Position	In Championship Since	Championship Titles (Pre 2026)	Last Championship Title (Pre 2026)
Adare	Adare		Semi-Finalist	Non-Qualifier	2017	4	2024
Askeaton-Ballysteen-Kilcornan	Askeaton, Ballysteen & Kilcornan		I.F.C Champions	Relegation Semi-Finalist	2026	3	1972
Ballylanders	Ballylanders & Knockadea		Relegation Finalist	Relegated to Intermediate	1999	4	2014
Fr Casey's	Abbeyfeale		Semi-Finalist		1992	8	2006
Galtee Gaels	Anglesboro & Kilbehenny		Non-Qualifier	Non-Qualifier	2020	0	—
Kildimo-Pallaskenry	Kildimo & Pallaskenry		Relegation Semi-Finalist		2022	0	—
Monaleen	Castletroy		Quarter-Finalist	Semi-Finalist	1977	6	2016
Mungret St Paul's	Mungret		Champions	Semi-Finalist	2024	1	2025
Newcastle West	Newcastle West		Runners-Up	Quarter-Finalist	2007	7	2023
Oola	Oola		Relegation Semi-Finalist	Relegation Finalist	2016	6	1979
Rathkeale	Rathkeale		Non-Qualifier	Quarter-Finalist	2025	0	—
St Kiernan's	Ardagh, Carrigkerry, Coolcappa & Kilcolman		Quarter-Finalist	Relegation Semi-Finalist	Never Relegated	3	1990

== Group Stage ==
=== Group 1 ===
Advance to semi-finals Advance to quarter-finals Advance to relegation semi-finals

Team	Matches				Score			Pts
Team	Pld	W	D	L	For	Against	Diff	Pts
Fr Casey's	5	5	0	0	101	63	+38	10
Newcastle West	5	4	0	1	109	80	+29	8
Monaleen	5	2	1	2	87	89	-2	5
Galtee Gaels	5	1	1	3	83	87	-4	3
Oola	5	0	2	3	78	107	-29	2
St Kiernan's	5	0	2	3	70	102	-32	2

==== Round 1 ====
9 July 2026 Round 1	Galtee Gaels	1-12 (15) – (18) 2-12	Monaleen	Galbally
19:00 IST (UTC+1)		(HT: 0-05 – 1-08)
	Pts: Bob Childs 0-5 (3f), Eoghan McNamara 1-0, Conor McGrath 0-2 (1'45), Cian Ryan 0-2, Conor McNamara 0-1, Alan Condon 0-1, Seán Casey 0-1	Report	Pts: Mark Torpey 1-2 (1tp), Alan Nicholas 0-4, Andrew Kearney 1-0, Jack Canny 0-2, Tadhg O'Siochrú 0-1, Luke Murphy 0-1, Darragh Murray 0-1, Jamie Crowley 0-1 (f)	Referee: Jonathan Hayes

9 July 2026 Round 1	Fr Casey's	1-16 (19) – (16) 1-13	Newcastle West	Athea
19:30 IST (UTC+1)		(HT: 1-09 – 1-05)
	Pts: Eliah Riordan 0-6 (2tpf, 1f, 1'45), Ronan Quirke 0-3 (1f), Adrian Enright 1-0, Rory O'Brien 0-2, Seán Kilbridge 0-2, Aaron O'Kelly 0-1, Michael Kilbridge 0-1, Leon Curtin 0-1	Report	Pts: Bryan Nix 0-5, Eoin Hurley 0-4 (3f), Mike McMahon 1-0, Aaron Neville 0-2, Iain Corbett 0-1, Niall McAuliffe 0-1	Referee: Michael Browne

11 July 2026 Round 1	St Kieran's	1-11 (14) – (14) 0-14	Oola	Kilmallock
19:30 IST (UTC+1)		(HT: 0-05 – 0-10)
	Pts: Alan Daly 0-4 (2f), Mossie Shine 1-0, Darragh Treacy 0-3 (1tp), John Hayes 0-1, Kevin Meade 0-1, Adam Lacey 0-1, Brendan McCarthy 0-1	Report	Pts: Paddy Ryan 0-6 (3f), Tom Ryan 0-3, Darragh Coughlan 0-2 (tp), Dylan McGrath 0-1, Mikey O'Brien 0-1, Paddy Ryan 0-1	Referee: Johnny Murphy

==== Round 2 ====
17 July 2026 Round 2	Monaleen	1-09 (12) – (19) 1-16	Fr Casey's	Rathkeale
19:30 IST (UTC+1)		(HT: 0-07 – 1-06)		Venue: Seán Finn Park
	Pts: Darragh Murray 0-6 (1tpf), Jack Canny 1-0, Tadhg Ó Siochrú 0-3 (2f)	Report	Pts: Ronan Quirke 1-5 (1f), Michael Kilbridge 0-3, Adrian Enright 0-3, Eliah Riordan 0-2 (1f), Rory O'Brien 0-1, Mark McCarthy 0-1, Culann Quigley 0-1	Referee: Donnacha Ó Callaghan

17 July 2026 Round 2	Newcastle West	4-12 (24) – (14) 1-11	St Kieran's	Athea
19:30 IST (UTC+1)		(HT: 2-04 – 1-06)
	Pts: Seán Murphy 2-0, Eoin Hurley 0-4, Ian Corbett 1-0, Con Enright 1-0 (og), Lee Woulfe 0-3, Bryan Nix 0-2, Niall McAuliffe 0-1, Brian Foley 0-1, Mike McMahon 0-1	Report	Pts: John Hayes 1-1, Dylan Moloney 0-2, Seán Ryan 0-2, Joe Reidy 0-2, Alan Daly 0-2, Jack O'Sullivan 0-1, Kevin Meade 0-1	Referee: Kieran Guina

18 July 2026 Round 2	Oola	2-11 (17) – (17) 2-11	Galtee Gaels	Knocklong
19:30 IST (UTC+1)		(HT: 0-07 – 0-06)
	Pts: Paddy Ryan 0-6 (3f, 1tpf), Dylan McGrath 1-1 (1pen), Mikey O'Brien 1-0, Raymond Ryan 0-3, Tom Ryan 0-1	Report	Pts: Bob Childs 1-7 (1pen, 2f, 1tpf), Seán Casey 1-1, Jack Ryan 0-1, Conor McGrath 0-1, Eoghan McNamara 0-1	Referee: John O'Halloran

==== Round 3 ====
13 August 2026 Round 3	Monaleen	2-10 (16) – (16) 1-13	St Kieran's	Fedamore
18:45 IST (UTC+1)		(HT: 1-09 – 0-05)		Venue: Fedamore GAA
	Pts: Mark Torpey 1-3, Andrew Kearney 1-0, Darragh Murray 0-3 (1tpf), Luke Murphy 0-2, Alan Nicholas 0-1, Shane Dolan 0-1	Report	Pts: John Hayes 0-8 (1tpf), Liam Kennedy 1-1, Alan Daly 0-2, Seán Long 0-1, Seán Ryan 0-1	Referee: Johnny Murphy

13 August 2026 Round 3	Newcastle West	4-15 (27) – (16) 0-16	Oola	Mungret
18:45 IST (UTC+1)		(HT: 1-03 – 0-09)		Venue: Mungret St Paul's GAA
	Pts: Eoin Hurley 0-7 (2f), Niall McAuliffe 1-3, Thomas Qulligan 1-1, Shane Stack 1-1, Seán Murphy 1-0, Mike McMahon 0-1, Brian Foley 0-1, Aaron Neville 0-1	Report	Pts: Paddy Ryan 0-6 (2f), Tom Ryan 0-2, John O'Callaghan 0-2, Eamon Landers 0-2, Darragh Coughlan 0-2, Mikey O'Brien 0-1, Dylan McGrath 0-1	Referee: David Burke

15 August 2026 Round 3	Fr Casey's	1-13 (16) – (11) 0-11	Galtee Gaels	Croom
18:00 IST (UTC+1)		(HT: 0-06 – 0-06)		Venue: Páirc na nGael
	Pts: Culann Quigley 1-1, Jamie O'Connor 0-2, Oisín Woulfe 0-2, Eliah Riordan 0-2 ('1'45), Adrian Enright 0-2, Ronan Quirke 0-1 (f), Rory O'Brien 0-1, Diarmuid Buckley 0-1, Mark McCarthy 0-1	Report	Pts: Bob Childs 0-7 (6f), Tommie Childs 0-2, Seán Casey 0-1, Jack Ryan 0-1	Referee: John O'Halloran

==== Round 4 ====
20 August 2026 Round 4	St Kieran's	1-10 (13) – (26) 3-17	Fr Casey's	Knockaderry
18:45 IST (UTC+1)		(HT: 0-05 – 2-07)		Venue: Knockaderry GAA
	Pts: John Hayes 0-5 (2f, 1'45, 1tpf), Liam Kennedy 1-1, Jack O'Sullivan 0-2, Seán Ryan 0-1, Alan Daly 0-1 (f)	Report	Pts: Eliah Riordan 0-7 (1f, 2tpf), Culann Quigley 1-1, John Riordan 1-0, Danny McCarthy 1-0, Mark McCarthy 0-3, Evan O'Connor 0-2, Ronan Quirke 0-2 (1f), Rory O'Brien 0-2	Referee: Donnacha O'Callaghan

21 August 2026 Round 4	Galtee Gaels	0-18 (18) – (23) 3-14	Newcastle West	Kilmallock
18:30 IST (UTC+1)				Venue: Fitzgerald Park
	Pts: Bob Childs 0-7 (2tp, 2f, 1'45), Tommie Childs 0-6 (3tpf), Seán McGrath 0-3 (1tp), Cian Ryan 0-1, Seán Clancy 0-1	Report	Pts: Mike McMahon 2-1, Thomas Quilligan 1-3 (1tpf), Eoin Hurley 0-3 (1f), Brian Foley 0-2, Iain Corbett 0-2 (tp), Shane Stack 0-1, Brian O'Sullivan 0-1, Emmet Rigter 0-1	Referee: Timmy McGrath

22 August 2026 Round 4	Oola	0-20 (20) – (28) 5-13	Monaleen	Cappamore
18:30 IST (UTC+1)		(HT: 0-11 – 1-06)		Venue: Cappamore GAA
	Pts: Paddy Ryan 0-10 (2tp, 1tpf, 3f), Dylan McGrath 0-5 (2tp), Tom Ryan 0-2 (tp), Kevin Maher 0-1, Shane O'Grady 0-1, Darragh Coughlan 0-1	Report	Pts: Darragh Murray 1-7 (2tp, 2f), Mark Torpey 2-1, Shane Dolan 1-2, Barry Griffin 1-0, Darragh Kennedy 0-2, Conall O'Duinn 0-1	Referee: Jonathan Hayes

==== Round 5 ====
10 September 2026 Round 5	Monaleen	1-10 (13) – (19) 3-10	Newcastle West	Rathkeale
18:00 IST (UTC+1)		(HT: 0-03 – 1-09)		Venue: Seán Finn Park
	Pts: Darragh Murray 0-5 (3f, 1tpf), Barry Griffin 1-0, Darach Ó Siochrú 0-2 (1f), Mark Torpey 0-1, Conal Ó Duinn 0-1, Shane Dolan 0-1	Report	Pts: Eoin Hurley 0-4 (1tpf), Iain Corbett 1-0 (pen), Brian Hurley 1-0, Lee Woulfe 1-0, Emmet Rigter 0-3, Thomas Quilligan 0-2, Brian Foley 0-1	Referee: Jonathan Hayes

10 September 2026 Round 5	Fr Casey's	1-18 (21) – (11) 1-08	Oola	Kilmallock
18:00 IST (UTC+1)		(HT: 0-11 – 1-05)		Venue: Fitzgerald Park
	Pts: Ronan Quirke 0-6 (2f), Eliah Riordan 0-5 (1tpf, 1'45), Evan O'Connor 1-0, Seán Kilbridge 0-2 (tp), Dylan Quirke 0-1, Callum Boyce 0-1, Jamie O'Connor 0-1, Diarmuid Buckley 0-1, Mark McCarthy 0-1	Report	Pts: Paddy Ryan 0-7 (1f, 1tp, 1tpf), Shane O'Grady 1-1	Referee: Johnny Murphy

10 September 2026 Round 5	Galtee Gaels	2-16 (22) – (13) 1-10	St Kieran's	Ballyagran
18:00 IST (UTC+1)		(HT: 1-04 – 1-08)
	Pts: Bob Childs 1-5 (1pen, 2f), Maurice O'Sullivan 1-2, Conor McGrath 0-5, Alan Condon 0-2, Eoghan McNamara 0-1, Jack Ryan 0-1	Report	Pts: Jonathan Hayes 1-4 (2tpf), Liam Kennedy 0-3 (1tpf), Alan Daly 0-2 (2f), Shane O'Mahony 0-1	Referee: Michael Sexton

=== Group 2 ===
Advance to semi-finals Advance to quarter-finals Advance to relegation semi-finals

Team	Matches				Score			Pts
Team	Pld	W	D	L	For	Against	Diff	Pts
Mungret St Paul's	5	4	0	1	102	70	+32	8
Rathkeale	5	3	1	1	92	76	+16	7
Kildimo-Pallaskenry	5	3	0	2	81	79	+2	6
Adare	5	2	1	2	114	92	+22	5
Ballylanders	5	1	0	4	73	99	-26	2
Askeaton-Ballysteen-Kilcornan	5	1	0	4	58	104	-46	2

==== Round 1 ====
10 July 2026 Round 1	Adare	3-15 (24) – (27) 2-21	Mungret St Paul's	Newcastle West
19:30 IST (UTC+1)		(HT: 2-08 – 1-09)
	Pts: Robbie Bourke 1-5 (2tpf, 2'45), Hugh Bourke 1-2 (1f), Shane O'Connor 1-1, Michael O'Mahony 0-4 (1tp), Rory O'Connor 0-1, Shane Costello 0-1, Jack English 0-1	Report	Pts: Shane Barry 1-6 (1tp, 1f), John Hutton 0-7 (1tpf, 3f), Jeffrey Alfred 1-0 (og), Darragh Bridgeman 0-3, Diarmuid Hynes 0-2 (tp), Jack Dervan 0-1, Colin Rochford 0-1, Ronan McElligott 0-1	Referee: David Burke

10 July 2026 Round 1	Rathkeale	1-17 (20) – (16) 1-13	Ballylanders	Kilmallock
19:30 IST (UTC+1)
	Pts: Mikey Morrissey 1-1, Paul White 0-4, Patrick Wilmott 0-3 (1f), Barry Coleman 0-2, Fintan McNamara 0-2, Andrew White 0-2 (1f), Niall Sheahan 0-1, Tommy Dillane 0-1 ('45), Andrew Meade 0-1	Report	Pts: Danny Frewen 1-5 (1pen, 2tpf), Eoin O'Mahony 0-5 (2tpf), Oisín Browne 0-2, Darren Frewen 0-1	Referee: Michael Sexton

10 July 2026 Round 1	Askeaton-Ballysteen-Kilcornan	0-12 (12) – (10) 0-10	Kildimo-Pallaskenry	Rathkeale
19:30 IST (UTC+1)		(HT: 0-06 – 0-05)		Venue: Seán Finn Park
	Pts: Jamie Dolan 0-6 (3tpf), Paudie Murphy 0-4 (4f), Seán Downes 0-1, Alan McGrath 0-1	Report	Pts: Tom McCarthy 0-2, Cian O'Sullivan 0-2, Paudie Hartigan 0-2 (2f), Ryan Kelly 0-2, Cathal Downes 0-1, Seán Kavanagh 0-1	Referee: Liam O'Sullivan

==== Round 2 ====
16 July 2026 Round 2	Kildimo-Pallaskenry	4-11 (23) – (16) 0-16	Rathkeale	Foynes
19:30 IST (UTC+1)		(HT: 0-05 – 0-09)
	Pts: Peter Nash 1-2 (1f), Conor Staff 1-1, Ryan Kelly 0-4 (1tp), Cathal Downes 0-4 (1tpf), Dylan Moloney 1-0, Jack Butler 1-0	Report	Pts: Barry Coleman 0-8 (3tp), Andrew White 0-5 (1f), Fintan McNamara 0-1, Mikey Morrissey 0-1, Patrick Wilmot 0-1	Referee: Jonathan Hayes

17 July 2026 Round 2	Mungret St Paul's	2-11 (17) – (10) 0-10	Askeaton-Ballysteen-Kilcornan	Ballybrown
19:30 IST (UTC+1)		(HT: 2-03 – 0-02)
	Pts: Shane Barry 1-2, Brendan Giltename 1-1 (1pen), Jack Dervan 0-2, John Hutton 0-2 (2f), Rob Hegarty 0-1, Darragh Bridgeman 0-1, Tom Lloyd 0-1, Diarmuid Hynes 0-1	Report	Pts: Pádraig Murphy 0-2 (2f), Pádraig McMahon 0-2, Seán Downes 0-2 (tp), Fiachra Butler-White 0-1, Shane Gallagher 0-1, Tomás Sheehan 0-1, Danny Neville 0-1	Referee: Timmy McGrath

18 July 2026 Round 2	Ballylanders	1-15 (18) – (21) 2-15	Adare	Ballyagran
14:00 IST (UTC+1)		(HT: 0-07 – 1-09)
	Pts: Eoin O'Mahony 0-6 (2f, 2tpf), Oisín Browne 0-4, Danny Frewen 0-3 (3f), Darren Frewen 0-2	Report	Pts: Michael O'Mahony 1-5, Hugh Bourke 0-3 (3f), Oran Collins 1-0, Shane O'Connor 0-2, Shane Costello 0-2, Robbie Burke 0-1, Stephen Flynn 0-1, Jack English 0-1	Referee: Michael Sexton

==== Round 3 ====
14 August 2026 Round 3	Kildimo-Pallaskenry	1-17 (20) – (18) 1-15	Adare	Rathkeale
19:00 IST (UTC+1)		(HT: 0-05 – 1-09)		Venue: Seán Finn Park
	Pts: Peter Nash 0-8 (3f), Cathal Downes 0-5 (1f, 1tpf), Jack Butler 1-0, Jose Azzopardi 0-3, Dylan Corrigan 0-1	Report	Pts: Robbie Bourke 0-5 (1'45), Hugh Bourke 0-3 (2f), Stephen Flynn 0-3, Shane O'Connor 1-0, Shane Costelloe 0-2, Michael O'Mahony 0-1, Davy Lyons 0-1	Referee: Jonathan Hayes

14 August 2026 Round 3	Ballylanders	0-11 (11) – (24) 2-18	Mungret St Paul's	Kilmallock
19:15 IST (UTC+1)		(HT: 0-02 – 1-12)		Venue: Fitzgerald Park
	Pts: Eoin O'Mahony 0-4 (2tpf), Shane O'Donoghue 0-4 (1f), Danny Frewen 0-1, Darren Frewen 0-1, Robbie Downey 0-1	Report	Pts: John Hutton 0-5 (5f), Darragh Bridgeman 1-2, Jack Somers 1-1, Diarmuid Hynes 0-3, Jack Dervan 0-3 (2m), Shane Barry 0-2, Killian Ryan 0-1, Tom Llyod 0-1	Referee: Timmy McGrath

15 August 2026 Round 3	Rathkeale	2-19 (25) – (9) 1-06	Askeaton-Ballysteen-Kilcornan	Newcastle West
15:00 IST (UTC+1)		(HT: 1-05 – 0-05)		Venue: Newcastle West GAA
	Pts: Andrew Meade 2-2, Barry Coleman 0-7 (2f, 2tpf), Andrew White 0-4 (4f), Fintan McNamara 0-2, Eoin O'Donnell 0-2, Mikey Morrissey 0-1, Josh O'Connor 0-1	Report	Pts: Sam Duggan 1-0 (pen), Danny Neville 0-2, Shane Gallagher 0-1, Colm O'Flaherty 0-1, Paul O'Shaughnessy 0-1, Pádraig Murphy 0-1	Referee: Donnacha O'Callaghan

==== Round 4 ====
21 August 2026 Round 4	Mungret St Paul's	3-13 (22) – (10) 0-10	Kildimo-Pallaskenry	Ballybrown
18:30 IST (UTC+1)		(HT: 0-08 – 0-07)		Venue: Páirc Uí Riain
	Pts: Shane Barry 1-3, Darragh O'Sullivan 1-2, Jack Dervan 1-0, Darragh Bridgeman 0-3, Diarmuid Hynes 0-3, John Hutton 0-1, Conor O'Longaigh 0-1	Report	Pts: Peter Nash 0-4 (1f), Ryan Kelly 0-3, Cathal Downes 0-2, Paudi Hartigan 0-1	Referee: Alan Kehoe

21 August 2026 Round 4	Askeaton-Ballysteen-Kilcornan	0-16 (16) – (17) 1-14	Ballylanders	Limerick
18:30 IST (UTC+1)		(HT: 0-08 – 0-04)		Venue: St Patrick's GAA
	Pts: Danny Neville 0-6, Pádraig Murphy 0-4 (2f), Pakie Moran 0-2, John Fitzsimons 0-1, Jamie Dolan 0-1 (f), Sam Duggan 0-1, Paul O'Shaughnessy 0-1	Report	Pts: Danny Frewen 1-3 (1pen), Eoin O'Mahony 0-3 (1tpf), Adam Frewen 0-2, Ciarán Kelly 0-2, Shane O'Donoghue 0-2 (2f), Cathal Dennehy 0-2	Referee: Kieran Guina

22 August 2026 Round 4	Adare	1-13 (16) – (16) 1-13	Rathkeale	Feenagh
18:30 IST (UTC+1)				Venue: Páirc Caoimhín Ó Luing
	Pts: Hugh Bourke 0-7 (4f), Shane O'Connor 1-0, Michael O'Mahony 0-2, Paul Maher 0-2, Shane Costelloe 0-1 Cian Sparling 0-1	Report	Pts: Mikey Morrissey 1-1, Andrew White 0-4 (3f), Patrick Wilmott 0-3, Barry Coleman 0-2 (1f), Adam Shanagher 0-1, Fintan McNamara 0-1, Josh O'Connor 0-1	Referee: Michael Browne

==== Round 5 ====
11 September 2026 Round 5	Kildimo-Pallaskenry	2-12 (18) – (11) 0-11	Ballylanders	Cappamore
18:00 IST (UTC+1)		(HT: 0-06 – 0-04)		Venue: Cappamore GAA
	Pts: Peter Nash 0-5 (3f, 1'45), Conor Staff 1-1, Jake Higgins 1-0, Páidí Hartigan 0-2, Gary Sheehan 0-2, Jose Azzopardi 0-1, Shaun Barry 0-1, Tony McCarthy 0-1	Report	Pts: Eoin O'Mahony 0-4 (2tpf), Danny Frewen 0-4 (2f), Ciarán Kelly 0-1, Adam Frewen 0-1, Daithí Dennehy 0-1	Referee: Timmy McGrath

11 September 2026 Round 5	Rathkeale	0-15 (15) – (12) 1-09	Mungret St Paul's	Adare
18:00 IST (UTC+1)		(HT: 0-07 – 0-04)		Venue: Brother Rice Field
	Pts: Andrew White 0-5 (1f), Mikey Morrissey 0-3, Andrew Meade 0-3, Tommy Dillane 0-2, Barry Coleman 0-1, Josh O'Connor 0-1, Patrick Wilmott 0-1	Report	Pts: Darragh O'Sullivan 0-4 (3f), James Killian 1-1, Darragh Bridgeman 0-1, Shane Barry 0-1, Oisín Moss 0-1, Conor Ó Longaigh 0-1	Referee: Kieran Guina

11 September 2026 Round 5	Askeaton-Ballysteen-Kilcornan	0-11 (11) – (35) 4-23	Adare	Rathkeale
18:00 IST (UTC+1)		(HT: 0-06 – 2-11)		Venue: Seán Finn Park
	Pts: Danny Neville 0-6 (3f), Jamie Dolan 0-2 (tpf), Paul O'Shaughnessy 0-2, Colm O'Flaherty 0-1	Report	Pts: Robbie Bourke 0-9 (1tpf), Shane O'Connor 2-2, Hugh Bourke 1-4 (1f), Roy Gleeson 1-1, Mark Connolly 0-3, Michael O'Mahony 0-1, Shane Costelloe 0-1, Ollie Desmond 0-1, Jack English 0-1	Referee: Paddy Lyons

== Knockout Stage ==
=== Relegation Semi-Finals ===
3 October 2026 Relegation Semi-Final	Ballylanders	0-11 (11) – (16) 1-13	St Kieran's	Kilmallock
15:00 IST (UTC+1)				Venue: Fitzgerald Park
				Referee: Timmy McGrath

4 October 2026 Relegation Semi-Final	Oola	1-14 (17) – (21) 3-12	Askeaton-Ballysteen-Kilcornan	Limerick
15:00 IST (UTC+1)				Venue: Childers Road
				Referee: Tom McGlinchey

=== Relegation Final ===
17 October 2026 Relegation Final	Ballylanders	1-14 (17) – (20) 2-14 (a.e.t.)	Oola	Hospital
14:00 IST (UTC+1)				Venue: St John's Park
				Referee: John O'Halloran

=== Quarter-Finals ===
3 October 2026 Quarter-Final	Rathkeale	0-13 (13) – (15) 3-06	Monaleen	Mungret
13:00 IST (UTC+1)				Venue: Mungret St Paul's GAA
				Referee: Kieran Guina

3 October 2026 Quarter-Final	Newcastle West	1-11 (14) – (19) 1-16	Kildimo-Pallaskenry	Rathkeale
14:00 IST (UTC+1)				Venue: Seán Finn Park
				Referee: Jonathan Hayes

=== Semi-Finals ===
17 October 2026 Semi-Final	Mungret St Paul's	0-20 (20) – (22) 2-16 (a.e.t.)	Kildimo-Pallaskenry	Ballybrown
14:00 IST (UTC+1)				Venue: Páirc Uí Riain
				Referee: Timmy McGrath

18 October 2026 Semi-Final	Fr Casey's	3-12 (21) – (9) 1-06	Monaleen	Rathkeale
16:00 IST (UTC+1)				Venue: Seán Finn Park
				Referee: Jonathan Hayes

=== Final ===
1 November 2026 Final	Kildimo-Pallaskenry	v	Fr Casey's	Rathkeale
15:30 GMT (UTC+0)				Venue: Mick Neville Park
