= 2022 National Football League (Ireland) =

Gaelic football competition

National Football League
League details
- Dates: 29 January – 3 April 2022
- Teams: 32

League champions
- Winners: Kerry (23rd win)

League runners-up
- Runners-up: Mayo

Other division winners
- Division 2: Roscommon
- Division 3: Louth
- Division 4: Cavan

The 2022 National Football League, known for sponsorship reasons as the Allianz National Football League, is the 91st staging of the National Football League (NFL), an annual Gaelic football tournament for county teams. Thirty-one county teams from the island of Ireland, plus London, participated; Kilkenny did not take part.

== Format ==
=== League structure ===
Teams by Province and Division
Province	Division 1	Division 2	Division 3	Division 4	Total
Connacht	1	2	0	2	5
Leinster	2	2	5	2	11
Munster	1	2	1	2	6
Ulster	4	2	2	1	9
England	0	0	0	1	1
Total	8	8	8	8	32

In the top division, Division 1, teams competed to become National Football League (NFL) champion. The top two teams qualified for the NFL Final, with the winner crowned NFL champion.

The 2022 National Football League consisted of four divisions of eight teams. Each team played every other team in its division once. Two points were awarded for a win and one point for a draw.

Teams competed for promotion and relegation to a higher or lower league. In Divisions 2, 3 and 4, the first and second-places teams were promoted, while the bottom two teams of divisions 1, 2 and 3 were relegated.

=== Tiebreakers for league ranking ===
As per the Official GAA Guide - Part 1 - Section 6.21 -

If two teams in the same group were equal on points on completion of the league phase, the following tie-breaking criteria would be applied:

1. Where two teams only are involved - the outcome of the meeting of the two teams in the previous game in the Competition;

If three or more teams in the same group were equal on points on completion of the league phase, the following tie-breaking criteria would be applied:

1. Scoring Difference (subtracting the total scores against from total scores for);
2. Highest Total Score For;
3. A Play-Off.

In the event that two teams or more finished with equal points, but had been affected by a disqualification, loss of game on a proven objection, retirement or walkover, the tie would be decided by the following means:

1. Score Difference from the games in which only the teams involved, (teams tied on points), had played each other. (subtracting the total Scores Against from total Scores For)
2. Highest Total Score For, in which only the teams involved, had played each other, and had finished equal in (i)
3. A Play-Off

== Division 1 ==
Locations of the 2022 NFL Division 1 teams.

=== Table ===
Pos	Team	Pld	W	D	L	PF	PA	PD	Pts	Qualification
1	Kerry	7	5	1	1	118	91	+27	11	Advance to National League Final
2	Mayo	7	4	1	2	108	94	+14	9	Advance to National League Final
3	Armagh	7	3	1	3	108	98	+10	7	
4	Donegal	7	3	1	3	95	103	−8	7	
5	Tyrone	7	3	1	3	85	96	−11	7	
6	Monaghan	7	2	2	3	100	113	−13	6	
7	Kildare	7	2	1	4	104	111	−7	5	Relegation to 2023 NFL Division 2
8	Dublin	7	2	0	5	106	118	−12	4	Relegation to 2023 NFL Division 2

Updated to match(es) played on 27 March 2022. Source: GAA.ie
Rules for classification: Tiebreakers

=== Matches ===
==== Round 1 ====
29 January 2022 Round 1	Dublin	1-13 (16) – (21) 2-15	Armagh	Drumcondra, Dublin
19:00 GMT (UTC+0)				Venue: Croke Park
		Report		Referee: Fergal Kelly (Longford); Attendance: 22,707

30 January 2022 Round 1	Kildare	0-13 (13) – (13) 1-10	Kerry	Newbridge
13:45 GMT (UTC+0)				Venue: St. Conleth's Park
		Report		Referee: David Coldrick (Meath)

30 January 2022 Round 1	Mayo	0-11 (11) – (11) 0-11	Donegal	Sligo
13:45 GMT (UTC+0)				Venue: Markievicz Park
		Report		Referee: N Mooney (Cavan); Attendance: 9,000

30 January 2022 Round 1	Tyrone	0-09 (9) – (9) 0-09	Monaghan	Omagh
15:45 GMT (UTC+0)				Venue: Healy Park
		Report		Referee: J McQuillan (Cavan); Attendance: 7,000

==== Round 2 ====
5 February 2022 Round 2	Kerry	1-15 (18) – (11) 0-11	Dublin	Tralee
19:00 GMT (UTC+0)				Venue: Austin Stack Park
		Report		Referee: Conor Lane (Cork); Attendance: 12,000

6 February 2022 Round 2	Armagh	2-14 (20) – (14) 0-14	Tyrone	Armagh
14:00 GMT (UTC+0)				Venue: Athletic Grounds
		Report		Referee: David Gough (Meath); Attendance: 14,328

6 February 2022 Round 2	Monaghan	1-11 (14) – (16) 2-10	Mayo	Clones
14:00 GMT (UTC+0)				Venue: St. Tiernach's Park
				Referee: Sean Hurson (Tyrone)

6 February 2022 Round 2	Donegal	2-11 (17) – (12) 1-09	Kildare	Ballybofey
14:30 GMT (UTC+0)				Venue: MacCumhaill Park
		Report		Referee: Barry Cassidy (Derry)

==== Round 3 ====
19 February 2022 Round 3	Armagh	1-07 (10) – (10) 0-10	Monaghan	Armagh
17:30 GMT (UTC+0)				Venue: Athletic Grounds
		Report		Attendance: 11,500

19 February 2022 Round 3	Dublin	0-12 (12) – (17) 2-11	Mayo	Drumcondra, Dublin
19:30 GMT (UTC+0)				Venue: Croke Park
		Report		Referee: David Gough (Meath); Attendance: 24,000

20 February 2022 Round 3	Kerry	1-13 (16) – (7) 0-07	Donegal	Killarney
13:45 GMT (UTC+0)				Venue: Fitzgerald Stadium
		Report		Referee: Maurice Deegan (Laois)

20 February 2022 Round 3	Tyrone	2-07 (13) – (12) 0-12	Kildare	Omagh
15:45 GMT (UTC+0)				Venue: Healy Park
		Report		Referee: M McNally (Monaghan)

==== Round 4 ====
26 February 2022 Round 4	Donegal	2-10 (16) – (12) 0-12	Tyrone	Ballybofey
19:30 GMT (UTC+0)				Venue: MacCumhaill Park
		Report		Referee: Brendan Cawley (Kildare)

27 February 2022 Round 4	Kildare	1-12 (15) – (12) 0-12	Dublin	Newbridge
13:45 GMT (UTC+0)				Venue: St. Conleth's Park
				Referee: Sean Hurson

27 February 2022 Round 4	Mayo	0-15 (15) – (13) 1-10	Armagh	Roscommon
14:00 GMT (UTC+0)				Venue: Dr. Hyde Park
				Referee: David Coldrick; Attendance: 11,000

27 February 2022 Round 4	Monaghan	1-12 (15) – (23) 3-14	Kerry	Inniskeen
14:00 GMT (UTC+0)				Venue: Páirc Grattan
				Referee: Paddy Neilan

==== Round 5 ====
12 March 2022 Round 5	Armagh	1-12 (15) – (10) 0-10	Kildare	Armagh
18:00 GMT (UTC+0)				Venue: Athletic Grounds
		Report		Referee: Joe McQuillan (Cavan)

12 March 2022 Round 5	Kerry	1-12 (15) – (14) 0-14	Mayo	Tralee
19:30 GMT (UTC+0)				Venue: Austin Stack Park
		Report		Referee: Brendan Cawley (Kildare)

13 March 2022 Round 5	Donegal	0-10 (10) – (15) 1-12	Monaghan	Ballybofey
13:45 GMT (UTC+0)				Venue: MacCumhaill Park
		Report		Referee: Martin Hurson (Tyrone)

13 March 2022 Round 5	Tyrone	0-08 (8) – (13) 0-13	Dublin	Omagh
15:45 GMT (UTC+0)				Venue: Healy Park
		Report		Referee: Barry Cassidy (Derry)

==== Round 6 ====
19 March 2022 Round 6	Tyrone	0-11 (11) – (9) 0-09	Mayo	Omagh
19:00 GMT (UTC+0)				Venue: Healy Park
				Referee: Maurice Deegan

20 March 2022 Round 6	Armagh	0-13 (13) – (16) 1-13	Kerry	Armagh
14:00 GMT (UTC+0)				Venue: Athletic Grounds

20 March 2022 Round 6	Kildare	0-24 (24) – (15) 1-12	Monaghan	Newbridge
14:30 GMT (UTC+0)				Venue: St. Conleth's Park

20 March 2022 Round 6	Dublin	2-15 (21) – (17) 2-11	Donegal	Drumcondra, Dublin
15:45 GMT (UTC+0)				Venue: Croke Park
		Report

==== Round 7 ====
27 March 2022 Round 7	Donegal	1-14 (17) – (16) 1-13	Armagh	Letterkenny
13:45 IST (UTC+1)				Venue: O'Donnell Park
		Report		Attendance: 5,650

27 March 2022 Round 7	Kerry	2-11 (17) – (18) 1-15	Tyrone	Killarney
13:45 IST (UTC+1)				Venue: Fitzgerald Stadium

27 March 2022 Round 7	Mayo	2-20 (26) – (18) 0-18	Kildare	Carrick-on-Shannon
13:45 IST (UTC+1)				Venue: Páirc Seán Mac Diarmada

27 March 2022 Round 7	Monaghan	3-13 (22) – (21) 1-18	Dublin	Clones
13:45 IST (UTC+1)				Venue: St. Tiernach's Park

=== Final ===
TG4

3 April 2022
Final

Report

Kerry	3-19 (28) – (13) 0-13	Mayo
(HT: 1-10 (13) - 0-7 (7))

Croke Park, Drumcondra, Dublin
Referee: N Mooney (Cavan)
Attendance: 31,506

== Division 2 ==
=== Table ===
Pos	Team	Pld	W	D	L	PF	PA	PD	Pts	Qualification
1	Roscommon	7	5	2	0	123	87	+36	12	Advance to NFL Division 2 Final and promotion to 2023 NFL Division 1
2	Galway	7	6	0	1	141	100	+41	12	Advance to NFL Division 2 Final and promotion to 2023 NFL Division 1
3	Derry	7	5	1	1	110	82	+28	11	
4	Meath	7	2	2	3	93	111	−18	6	
5	Clare	7	2	2	3	88	87	+1	6	
6	Cork	7	2	1	4	112	138	−26	5	
7	Offaly	7	1	1	5	98	133	−35	3	Relegation to 2023 NFL Division 3
8	Down	7	0	1	6	78	115	−37	1	Relegation to 2023 NFL Division 3

Updated to match(es) played on 27 March 2022. Source: GAA.ie
Rules for classification: Tiebreakers

=== Matches ===
==== Round 1 ====
29 January 2022 Round 1	Derry	1-10 (13) – (6) 0-06	Down	Owenbeg
17:00 GMT (UTC+0)				Venue: Owenbeg Derry GAA Centre
		Report		Referee: Paddy Neilan (Roscommon)

30 January 2022 Round 1	Clare	1-13 (16) – (7) 0-07	Offaly	Ennis
14:00 GMT (UTC+0)				Venue: Cusack Park
		Report		Referee: Brendan Griffin (Kerry); Attendance: 825

30 January 2022 Round 1	Galway	1-14 (17) – (6) 0-06	Meath	Salthill
14:00 GMT (UTC+0)				Venue: Pearse Stadium
		Report		Referee: Patrick Maguire (Longford)

30 January 2022 Round 1	Roscommon	1-13 (16) – (10) 0-10	Cork	Roscommon
14:00 GMT (UTC+0)				Venue: Dr. Hyde Park
		Report		Referee: Seamus Mulhare (Laois)

==== Round 2 ====
5 February 2022 Round 2	Down	0-09 (9) – (15) 1-12	Galway	Newry
				Venue: Páirc Esler
		Report		Referee: Brendan Cawley (Kildare)

5 February 2022 Round 2	Cork	1-13 (16) – (16) 1-13	Clare	Cork
				Venue: Páirc Uí Chaoimh
		Report		Referee: Maurice Deegan (Laois)

6 February 2022 Round 2	Offaly	0-07 (7) – (19) 2-13	Derry	Tullamore
				Venue: O'Connor Park
		Report		Referee: David Coldrick (Meath)

6 February 2022 Round 2	Meath	1-11 (14) – (18) 1-15	Roscommon	Navan
				Venue: Páirc Tailteann
		Report		Referee: Jerome Henry (Mayo)

==== Round 3 ====
20 February 2022 Round 3	Derry	1-13 (16) – (7) 0-07	Cork	Owenbeg
13:00 GMT (UTC+0)				Venue: Owenbeg Derry GAA Centre
		Report		Referee: J Connors (Donegal)

20 February 2022 Round 3	Roscommon	0-09 (9) – (9) 0-09	Clare	Roscommon
14:00 GMT (UTC+0)				Venue: Dr. Hyde Park
		Report		Referee: Patrick Maguire (Longford)

20 February 2022 Round 3	Meath	2-06 (12) – (12) 2-06	Down	Navan
14:00 GMT (UTC+0)				Venue: Páirc Tailteann
		Report		Referee: Noel Mooney (Cavan)

6 March 2022 Round 3	Galway	2-17 (23) – (19) 3-10	Offaly	Salthill
14:00 GMT (UTC+0)				Venue: Pearse Stadium
		Report		Referee: David Murnane (Cork)

==== Round 4 ====
26 February 2022 Round 4	Offaly	1-10 (13) – (13) 1-10	Meath	Tullamore
14:30 IST (UTC+1)				Venue: O'Connor Park
		Report		Referee: Fergal Kelly (Longford)

26 February 2022 Round 4	Cork	2-17 (23) – (31) 3-22	Galway	Cork
17:00 IST (UTC+1)				Venue: Páirc Uí Chaoimh
		Report		Referee: Cormac Reilly (Meath)

26 February 2022 Round 4	Down	0-10 (10) – (21) 1-18	Roscommon	Newry
17:00 IST (UTC+1)				Venue: Páirc Esler
		Report		Referee: Niall Cullen (Fermanagh)

27 February 2022 Round 4	Clare	0-10 (10) – (19) 2-13	Derry	Ennis
13:00 IST (UTC+1)				Venue: Cusack Park
		Report		Referee: Conor Lane (Cork)

==== Round 5 ====
12 March 2022 Round 5	Down	0-14 (14) – (15) 0-15	Offaly	Newry
17:00 IST (UTC+1)				Venue: Páirc Esler
		Report		Referee: Barry Judge (Sligo)

13 March 2022 Round 5	Galway	2-08 (14) – (8) 1-05	Clare	Salthill
14:00 IST (UTC+1)				Venue: Pearse Stadium
		Report		Referee: Conor Lane (Cork)

13 March 2022 Round 5	Meath	1-18 (21) – (13) 1-10	Cork	Navan
14:00 IST (UTC+1)				Venue: Páirc Tailteann
		Report		Referee: Liam Devenney (Mayo)

13 March 2022 Round 5	Roscommon	0-12 (12) – (12) 0-12	Derry	Roscommon
14:00 IST (UTC+1)				Venue: Dr. Hyde Park
		Report		Referee: Sean Lonergan (Tipperary)

==== Round 6 ====
20 March 2022 Round 6	Cork	1-16 (19) – (15) 1-12	Down	Cork
13:00 IST (UTC+1)				Venue: Páirc Uí Chaoimh
		Report

20 March 2022 Round 6	Derry	0-12 (12) – (23) 4-11	Galway	Owenbeg
13:00 IST (UTC+1)				Venue: Owenbeg Derry GAA Centre
		Report

20 March 2022 Round 6	Clare	0-09 (09) – (10) 0-10	Meath	Ennis
14:00 IST (UTC+1)				Venue: Cusack Park
		Report

20 March 2022 Round 6	Offaly	0-14 (14) – (24) 2-18	Roscommon	Tullamore
14:00 IST (UTC+1)				Venue: O'Connor Park
		Report

==== Round 7 ====
27 March 2022 Round 7	Down	1-09 (12) – (20) 2-14	Clare	Newry
14:00 IST (UTC+1)				Venue: Páirc Esler

27 March 2022 Round 7	Meath	2-11 (17) – (19) 1-16	Derry	Navan
14:00 IST (UTC+1)				Venue: Páirc Tailteann
		Report

27 March 2022 Round 7	Offaly	1-20 (23) – (24) 1-21	Cork	Tullamore
14:00 IST (UTC+1)				Venue: O'Connor Park

27 March 2022 Round 7	Roscommon	1-20 (23) – (18) 1-15	Galway	Roscommon
14:00 IST (UTC+1)				Venue: Dr. Hyde Park

=== Final ===
3 April 2022
Division 2 Final

Report

Roscommon	1-20 (23) – (22) 0-22	Galway

Croke Park, Drumcondra, Dublin
Referee: Niall Cullen (Fermanagh)
Attendance: 31,506

== Division 3 ==
=== Table ===
Pos	Team	Pld	W	D	L	PF	PA	PD	Pts	Qualification
1	Louth	7	5	1	1	90	83	+7	11	Advance to NFL Division 3 Final and promotion to 2023 NFL Division 2
2	Limerick	7	5	0	2	91	83	+8	10	Advance to NFL Division 3 Final and promotion to 2023 NFL Division 2
3	Westmeath	7	4	1	2	89	78	+11	9	
4	Antrim	7	3	1	3	88	71	+17	7	
5	Fermanagh	7	2	2	3	91	91	0	6	
6	Longford	7	2	1	4	81	102	−21	5	
7	Laois	7	2	1	4	92	88	+4	5	Relegation to 2023 NFL Division 4
8	Wicklow	7	1	1	5	77	103	−26	3	Relegation to 2023 NFL Division 4

Updated to match(es) played on 27 March 2022. Source: GAA.ie
Rules for classification: Tiebreakers — Longford finished ahead of Laois due to their head-to-head record.

=== Matches ===
==== Round 1 ====
29 January 2022 Round 1	Limerick	4-09 (21) – (14) 1-11	Longford	Limerick
17:00 GMT (UTC+0)				Venue: Gaelic Grounds
		Report

29 January 2022 Round 1	Fermanagh	0-08 (8) – (17) 1-14	Antrim	Enniskillen
19:00 GMT (UTC+0)				Venue: Brewster Park
		Report

30 January 2022 Round 1	Louth	1-10 (13) – (18) 3-09	Laois	Ardee
14:00 GMT (UTC+0)				Venue: Páirc Mhuire
		Report		Referee: Seán Laverty (Antrim)

30 January 2022 Round 1	Westmeath	1-16 (19) – (14) 2-08	Wicklow	Mullingar
14:00 GMT (UTC+0)				Venue: Cusack Park
		Report		Referee: James Molloy (Galway)

==== Round 2 ====
5 February 2022 Round 2	Antrim	0-11 (11) – (15) 2-09	Limerick	Belfast
14:00 GMT (UTC+0)				Venue: Corrigan Park
		Report		Referee: Paul Faloon (Down)

6 February 2022 Round 2	Longford	0-09 (9) – (9) 1-06	Louth	Longford
14:00 GMT (UTC+0)				Venue: Pearse Park
		Report		Referee: N McKenna (Monaghan)

6 February 2022 Round 2	Laois	0-11 (11) – (17) 2-11	Westmeath	Portlaoise
14:00 GMT (UTC+0)				Venue: O'Moore Park
		Report		Referee: Liam Devenney (Mayo)

6 February 2022 Round 2	Wicklow	1-10 (13) – (13) 2-07	Fermanagh	Aughrim
14:00 GMT (UTC+0)				Venue: Aughrim County Ground
		Report		Referee: David Hickey (Carlow)

==== Round 3 ====
19 February 2022 Round 3	Antrim	2-10 (16) – (10) 1-07	Wicklow	Belfast
14:00 GMT (UTC+0)				Venue: Corrigan Park
		Report		Referee: Paul Faloon (Down)

20 February 2022 Round 3	Limerick	1-12 (15) – (17) 1-14	Louth	Limerick
14:30 GMT (UTC+0)				Venue: UL North Campus
		Report		Referee: D Murnane (Cork)

5 March 2022 Round 3	Westmeath	0-10 (10) – (14) 0-14	Longford	Mullingar
14:00 GMT (UTC+0)				Venue: Cusack Park
		Report		Referee: Barry Tiernan (Dublin)

5 March 2022 Round 3	Fermanagh	3-15 (24) – (18) 3-09	Laois	Enniskillen
15:30 GMT (UTC+0)				Venue: Brewster Park
		Report		Referee: Joe Mc Quillan (Cavan)

==== Round 4 ====
26 February 2022 Round 4	Wicklow	1-09 (12) – (16) 1-13	Limerick	Aughrim
14:30 GMT (UTC+0)				Venue: Aughrim County Ground

26 February 2022 Round 4	Laois	1-08 (11) – (11) 1-08	Antrim	Portlaoise
18:00 GMT (UTC+0)				Venue: O'Moore Park
		Report		Referee: Niall McKenna (Monaghan)

27 February 2022 Round 4	Longford	1-10 (13) – (20) 3-11	Fermanagh	Longford
14:00 GMT (UTC+0)				Venue: Pearse Park
		Report		Referee: Barry Judge (Sligo)

27 February 2022 Round 4	Louth	1-15 (18) – (16) 1-13	Westmeath	Ardee
14:00 GMT (UTC+0)				Venue: Páirc Mhuire
		Report		Referee: Conor Dourneen (Cavan)

==== Round 5 ====
12 March 2022 Round 5	Antrim	1-19 (22) – (12) 0-12	Longford	Belfast
14:30 GMT (UTC+0)				Venue: Corrigan Park
		Report		Referee: Niall Cullen (Fermanagh)

12 March 2022 Round 5	Limerick	1-06 (9) – (15) 1-12	Westmeath	Limerick
19:00 GMT (UTC+0)				Venue: Gaelic Grounds
		Report		Referee: A Nolan (Wicklow)

13 March 2022 Round 5	Wicklow	0-08 (8) – (20) 1-17	Laois	Aughrim
14:00 GMT (UTC+0)				Venue: Aughrim County Ground
		Report		Referee: Cormac Reilly (Meath)

13 March 2022 Round 5	Fermanagh	0-14 (14) – (18) 2-12	Louth	Enniskillen
15:30 GMT (UTC+0)				Venue: Brewster Park
		Report		Referee: Martin McNally (Monaghan)

==== Round 6 ====
19 March 2022 Round 6	Laois	0-14 (14) – (15) 0-15	Limerick	Portlaoise
19:00 GMT (UTC+0)				Venue: O'Moore Park
		Report

20 March 2022 Round 6	Longford	2-13 (19) – (20) 0-20	Wicklow	Longford
14:00 GMT (UTC+0)				Venue: Pearse Park
		Report

20 March 2022 Round 6	Louth	1-12 (15) – (11) 1-08	Antrim	Ardee
14:00 GMT (UTC+0)				Venue: Páirc Mhuire
		Report

20 March 2022 Round 6	Westmeath	1-09 (12) – (12) 0-12	Fermanagh	Mullingar
14:00 GMT (UTC+0)				Venue: Cusack Park
		Report

==== Round 7 ====
27 March 2022 Round 7	Antrim	0-12 (12) – (16) 1-13	Westmeath	Belfast
14:00 GMT (UTC+0)				Venue: Corrigan Park

27 March 2022 Round 7	Laois	1-13 (16) – (23) 2-17	Longford	Portlaoise
14:00 GMT (UTC+0)				Venue: O'Moore Park

27 March 2022 Round 7	Limerick	1-16 (19) – (14) 0-14	Fermanagh	Limerick
14:00 GMT (UTC+0)				Venue: Gaelic Grounds

27 March 2022 Round 7	Wicklow	1-13 (16) – (23) 2-17	Louth	Aughrim
14:00 GMT (UTC+0)				Venue: Aughrim County Ground

=== Final ===
2 April 2022
15:30

Louth	1-14 (17) – (12) 0-12	Limerick
Mulroy (0-6, 3f, 2'45), Byrne (0-4), L. Jackson (1-0), Clutterbuck (0-1), Durnin (0-1), Nally (0-1), Sharkey (0-1)	Report	J. Ryan (0-3, 1f), H. Bourke (0-2), Enright (0-2), Nash (0-2), R. Bourke (0-2f), M. Donovan (0-1)

Croke Park, Dublin
Referee: B. Griffin (Kerry)

GK	1	James Califf (Dreadnots)
RCB	2	Dan Corcoran (Geraldines)
FB	3	Bevan Duffy (St Fechin's)
LCB	4	Donal McKenny (St Mary's)
RHB	5	Leonard Grey (St Patrick's)
CHB	6	Niall Sharkey (Glyde Rangers)
LHB	7	Conall McKeever (Clan na Gael)
MF	8	Tommy Durnin (Inniskeen Grattans, Monaghan)
MF	9	John Clutterbuck (Naomh Máirtin)
RHF	10	Liam Jackson (St Mary's)
CHF	11	Sam Mulroy (Naomh Máirtin) (c)
LHF	12	Craig Lennon (St Mochta's)
RCF	13	Ciarán Byrne (St Mochta's)
FF	14	Ciarán Downey (Newtown Blues)
LCF	15	Dáire Nally (Newtown Blues)
Substitutes:
	16	Tom Jackson (St Mary's) for Lennon
	17	Eóghan Callaghan (Naomh Máirtin) for Grey
	18	Conor Grimes (Glen Emmets) for Nally
	19	Conor Early (Oliver Plunketts) for Clutterbuck

GK	1	Donal O'Sullivan (Monaleen)
RCB	2	Seán O'Dea (Kilteely-Dromkeen)
FB	3	Brian Fanning (Pallasgreen)
LCB	4	Michael Donovan (Galbally)
RHB	5	Cian Sheehan (Newcastle West)
CHB	6	Iain Corbett (Newcastle West)
LHB	7	Paul Maher (Adare)
MF	8	Darragh Treacy (St Kieran's)
MF	9	Cillian Fahy (Dromcollogher/Broadford)
RHF	10	Adrian Enright (Father Casey's)
CHF	11	Killian Ryan (Mungret/St. Paul's)
LHF	12	James Naughton (St Senan's)
RCF	13	Peter Nash (Kildimo-Pallaskenry)
FF	14	Josh Ryan (Oola)
LCF	15	Hugh Bourke (Adare)
Substitutes:
	16	Robert Childs (Galtee Gaels) for Fahy
	17	Robbie Bourke (Adare) for Nash
	18	Pádraig De Brún (Firies, Kerry) for Killian Ryan
	19	Jim Liston (Gerald Griffins) for Josh Ryan
	20	Tony McCarthy (Kildimo-Pallaskenry) for Treacy

== Division 4 ==
=== Table ===
Pos	Team	Pld	W	D	L	PF	PA	PD	Pts	Qualification
1	Cavan	7	6	0	1	92	75	+17	12	Advance to NFL Division 4 Final and promotion to 2023 NFL Division 3
2	Tipperary	7	5	1	1	92	80	+12	11	Advance to NFL Division 4 Final and promotion to 2023 NFL Division 3
3	Sligo	7	5	0	2	127	87	+40	10	
4	Leitrim	7	4	0	3	116	102	+14	8	
5	London	7	3	0	4	79	96	−17	6	
6	Wexford	7	2	1	4	90	100	−10	5	
7	Carlow	7	1	1	5	92	134	−42	3	
8	Waterford	7	0	1	6	82	96	−14	1	

Source: GAA.ie
Rules for classification: Tiebreakers

=== Matches ===
London returned for the first time since March 2020, due to the impact of the COVID-19 pandemic on Gaelic games.

==== Round 1 ====
29 January 2022 Round 1	Carlow	1-13 (16) – (17) 2-11	London	Carlow
				Venue: Dr. Cullen Park
		Report		Referee: Chris Maguire (Clare)

30 January 2022 Round 1	Leitrim	0-08 (8) – (12) 0-12	Cavan	Carrick on Shannon
				Venue: Páirc Seán Mac Diarmada

30 January 2022 Round 1	Waterford	0-10 (10) – (10) 0-10	Tipperary	Dungarvan
				Venue: Fraher Field
		Report

30 January 2022 Round 1	Wexford	0-10 (10) – (12) 0-12	Sligo	Wexford
				Venue: Wexford Park

==== Round 2 ====
6 February 2022 Round 2	Cavan	0-17 (17) – (11) 1-08	Wexford	Cavan
				Venue: Breffni Park
		Report

6 February 2022 Round 2	London	1-12 (15) – (14) 2-08	Waterford	Ruislip
				Venue: McGovern Park

6 February 2022 Round 2	Sligo	0-28 (28) – (5) 0-05	Carlow	Sligo
				Venue: Markievicz Park

6 February 2022 Round 2	Tipperary	2-08 (14) – (22) 2-16	Leitrim	Thurles
				Venue: Semple Stadium

==== Round 3 ====
19 February 2022 Round 3	Carlow	2-12 (18) – (14) 2-08	Waterford	Carlow
				Venue: Dr. Cullen Park

20 February 2022 Round 3	Leitrim	0-09 (9) – (11) 2-05	London	Bekan
13:00 IST (UTC+1)				Venue: Connacht GAA Centre of Excellence
		Report		Referee: Maggie Farrelly (Cavan)

6 March 2022 Round 3	Sligo	0-10 (10) – (16) 1-13	Cavan	Sligo
14:00 IST (UTC+1)				Venue: Markievicz Park
		Report		Referee: Niall Cullen (Fermanagh)

6 March 2022 Round 3	Wexford	0-15 (15) – (16) 4-04	Tipperary	Wexford
14:00 IST (UTC+1)				Venue: Wexford Park
		Report		Referee: John Hickey (Carlow)

==== Round 4 ====
26 February 2022 Round 4	Tipperary	1-13 (16) – (12) 1-09	Sligo	Thurles
19:00 IST (UTC+1)				Venue: Semple Stadium
		Report

27 February 2022 Round 4	London	1-06 (9) – (11) 0-11	Wexford	Ruislip
13:00 IST (UTC+1)				Venue: McGovern Park
		Report		Referee: Kevin Faloon (Armagh)

27 February 2022 Round 4	Cavan	0-19 (19) – (15) 1-12	Carlow	Cavan
14:00 IST (UTC+1)				Venue: Breffni Park
		Report		Referee: S Laverty (Antrim)

27 February 2022 Round 4	Waterford	1-13 (16) – (23) 2-17	Leitrim	Dungarvan
14:00 IST (UTC+1)				Venue: Fraher Field
		Report		Referee: D Hickey (Carlow)

==== Round 5 ====
13 March 2022 Round 5	Sligo	3-19 (28) – (10) 0-10	London	Sligo
12:00 IST (UTC+1)				Venue: Markievicz Park
		Report		Referee: Thomas Murphy (Galway)

13 March 2022 Round 5	Carlow	1-10 (13) – (20) 2-14	Leitrim	Carlow
14:00 IST (UTC+1)				Venue: Dr. Cullen Park
		Report		Referee: John Ryan (Cork)

13 March 2022 Round 5	Cavan	1-07 (10) – (14) 1-11	Tipperary	Cavan
14:00 IST (UTC+1)				Venue: Breffni Park
		Report		Referee: Kieran Eannetta (Tyrone)

13 March 2022 Round 5	Wexford	0-15 (15) – (14) 0-14	Waterford	Wexford
14:00 IST (UTC+1)				Venue: Wexford Park
		Report		Referee: J Hayes (Limerick)

==== Round 6 ====
20 March 2022 Round 6	London	2-11 (17) – (18) 1-15	Cavan	Ruislip
12:00 IST (UTC+1)				Venue: McGovern Park
		Report

20 March 2022 Round 6	Waterford	1-11 (14) – (15) 0-15	Sligo	Dungarvan
14:00 IST (UTC+1)				Venue: Fraher Field
		Report

20 March 2022 Round 6	Leitrim	3-09 (18) – (14) 1-11	Wexford	Carrick on Shannon
14:30 IST (UTC+1)				Venue: Páirc Seán Mac Diarmada
		Report

20 March 2022 Round 6	Tipperary	2-16 (22) – (11) 0-11	Carlow	Thurles
15:45 IST (UTC+1)				Venue: Semple Stadium
		Report

==== Round 7 ====
26 March 2022 Round 7	Tipperary	1-14 (17) – (12) 0-12	London	Thurles
19:00 IST (UTC+1)				Venue: Semple Stadium

26 March 2022 Round 7	Carlow	0-14 (14) – (14) 1-11	Wexford	Carlow
13:00 IST (UTC+1)				Venue: Dr. Cullen Park

26 March 2022 Round 7	Cavan	3-21 (30) – (10) 0-10	Waterford	Cavan
18:00 IST (UTC+1)				Venue: Breffni Park

27 March 2022 Round 7	Sligo	2-16 (22) – (16) 2-10	Leitrim	Sligo
13:00 IST (UTC+1)				Venue: Markievicz Park

=== Final ===
TG4

2 April 2022
Final

Report

Cavan	2-10 (16) – (15) 0-15	Tipperary

Croke Park, Dublin
