= 2020 Limerick Senior Football Championship =

124th edition of the Limerick GAA's premier club Gaelic football tournament

Limerick S.F.C.
- Season: 2020
- Champions: Adare (3rd S.F.C. Title)
- Relegated: Dromcollogher/Broadford
- All Ireland SCFC: ???
- Winning Captain: ???
- Man of the Match: ???
- Winning Manager: ???
- Munster SCFC: None

The 2020 Limerick Senior Football Championship is the 124th edition of the Limerick GAA's premier club Gaelic football tournament for senior clubs in County Limerick, Ireland. 12 teams compete, with the winner representing not Limerick in the Munster Senior Club Football Championship due to the latter competition's cancellation. Due to the emergence of the COVID-19 pandemic, the format for this years championship was modified to employ four groups of three teams, rather than the usual two groups of six teams. The championship then progresses to a knock out stage.

Newcastle West were the defending champions after they defeated Oola in the 2019 final to claim their fourth S.F.C. crown.

This was Galtee Gaels return to the top flight for the first time since 1994 (a 25-season exodus) after claiming the 2019 Limerick I.F.C. title. They defeated Gerald Griffin's in a final replay. Galtee Gaels last won the I.F.C. in 1993.

== Team changes ==
The following teams have changed division since the 2019 championship season.

=== To S.F.C. ===
Promoted from 2019 I.F.C.

- Galtee Gaels - (Intermediate Champions)

=== From S.F.C. ===
Relegated to 2020 I.F.C.

- St. Senan's

== Group stage ==
There are 4 groups called Group A, B, C and D. The top two finishers in each group will qualify for the quarter-finals. The bottom finishers of each group will qualify for the Relegation Play-off.

=== Group A ===
Team	Pld	W	L	D	PF	PA	PD	Pts
Newcastle West	0	0	0	0	0	0	+0	0
Ballysteen	0	0	0	0	0	0	+0	0
Dromcollogher/Broadford	0	0	0	0	0	0	+0	0

Round 1:

- Newcastle West 2-12, 1-3 Drom/Broadford, 15/8/2020,

Round 2:

- Ballysteen 2-9, 1-12 Drom/Broadford, 23/8/2020,

Round 3:

- Newcastle West 2-07, 0-5 Ballysteen, 29/8/2020,

=== Group B ===
Team	Pld	W	L	D	PF	PA	PD	Pts
Adare	0	0	0	0	0	0	+0	0
Fr. Casey's	0	0	0	0	0	0	+0	0
Na Piarsaigh	0	0	0	0	0	0	+0	0

Round 1:

- Adare 3-14, 1-04 Na Piarsaigh, 15/8/2020,

Round 2:

- Fr. Casey's 1-13, 1-11 Na Piarsaigh, 21/8/2020,

Round 3:

- Adare 0–12, 0-17 Fr. Casey's, 30/8/2020,

=== Group C ===
Team	Pld	W	L	D	PF	PA	PD	Pts
Galbally	0	0	0	0	0	0	+0	0
Monaleen	0	0	0	0	0	0	+0	0
St. Kieran's	0	0	0	0	0	0	+0	0

Round 1:

- Galbally 2-7, 0-11 St. Kieran's, 16/8/2020,

Round 2:

- Monaleen 0-11, 0-06 St. Kieran's, 21/8/2020,

Round 3:

- Galbally 0-06, 0-12 Monaleen, 29/8/2020,

=== Group D ===
Team	Pld	W	L	D	PF	PA	PD	Pts
Oola	0	0	0	0	0	0	+0	0
Ballylanders	0	0	0	0	0	0	+0	0
Galtee Gaels	0	0	0	0	0	0	+0	0

Round 1:

- Oola 1-15, 0-11 Galtee Gaels, 16/8/2020,

Round 2:

- Ballylanders 1-16, 0-08 Galtee Gaels, 22/8/2020,

Round 3:

- Oola 2-08, 0-08 Ballylanders, 29/8/2020,

== Knock-out stages ==
=== Relegation play-off ===
The four bottom finishers from each group qualify for the Relegation Play-Off. The team to lose both matches will be relegated to the 2021 I.F.C.

20 September 2020; Relegation Semi-Final	Drom/Broadford	0-10 0-14	Na Piarsaigh	Killeedy

30 August 2020; 13:00; Relegation Semi-Final	St. Kieran's	0-15 0-12	Galtee Gaels	Kilmallock

27 September 2020; Relegation Final	Galtee Gaels	2-10 0-14	Drom/Broadford	Kilmallock

== Quarter-finals ==
The winners and runners up of each group qualify for the quarter-finals.

19 September 2020; 16:00; Quarter-Final	Newcastle West	0-11 1-13	Adare	Mick Neville Park

19 September 2020; 16:00; Quarter-Final	Fr. Casey's	0-8 0-14	Ballysteen	Newcastle West

19 September 2020; 16:00; Quarter-Final	Monaleen	0-9 1-08	Ballylanders	Bruff

19 September 2020; 16:00; Quarter-Final	Oola	0-11 1-11	Galbally	Kilmallock

== Semi-finals ==
27 September 2020; Semi-Final	Adare	1-11 0-08	Galbally	Kilmallock

27 September 2020; Semi-Final	Ballylanders	1-12 0-09	Ballysteen	Newcastle West

== Final ==
4 October 2020; Final	Adare	4-07 0-04	Ballylanders	Gaelic Grounds
