= Limerick Junior A Hurling Championship =

Annual hurling competition in County Limerick, Ireland

The Limerick Junior A Hurling Championship (known for sponsorship reasons as the Woodlands House Hotel County Junior A Hurling Championship and abbreviated to the Limerick JAHC) is an annual Gaelic Athletic Association competition organised by Limerick GAA exclusively for junior hurling clubs in County Limerick. The winner qualifies to represent the county in the Munster Junior Club Hurling Championship, the winner of which progresses to the All-Ireland Junior Club Hurling Championship. Apart from a few years when there was an Intermediate hurling Championship, the Junior Hurling championship was the second most important hurling competition in Limerick. When the Intermediate hurling Championship restarted in 1988, the Junior became the third most important competition and in 2014 with the advent of the Premier Intermediate hurling Championship it became the Fourth tier of Limerick hurling. In 2024 the Premier Junior A Hurling Championship was established, relegating the Junior A Hurling Championship to the Fifth tier.

== Roll of honour ==
Year	Winner	Score	Opponent	Score
2026	Monagea	2-14	Killeedy	1-06
2025	Castletown–Ballyagran	3-14	Templeglantine	0-09
2024	Monaleen	1-16	Rathkeale	1-14
2023	Mungret/St. Paul's	2-21 (4 penalties)	Feenagh-Kilmeedy	1-24 (1 penalty)
2022	St Kierans	0-14	Dromcollogher-Broadford	1-06
2021	Caherline	1-13	St Kierans	0-10
2020	Croagh-Kilfinny	2-22	Patrickswell	0-08
2019	Kilmallock	0-19	Castletown–Ballyagran	0-14
2018	Tournafulla	1-17	Killeedy	0-10
2017	St. Patrick's	0-18, 1-10 (R)	Kilmallock	1-15, 0-08 (R)
2016	Na Piarsaigh	1-16	St. Patrick's	1-12
2015	Dromcollogher-Broadford	1-16	Na Piarsaigh	4-06
2014	Feohanagh/Castlemahon	0-20	Na Piarsaigh	0-09
2013	Feenagh-Kilmeedy	0-14	Feohanagh/Castlemahon	0-11
2012	St Kierans	1-12	Monagea	0-14
2011	Cappamore	0-07, 1-16 (R)	Kilmallock	0-07, 0-05 (R)
2010	Effin	1-16	St Kierans	1-10
2009	Blackrock	2-18	Effin	1-16
2008	Monagea	3-08	Staker Wallace	2-09
2007	Caherline	3-12	Effin	1-09
2006	Mungret/St. Paul's	4-14	Askeaton	2-15
2005	Hospital/Herbertstown	1-12	Croagh-Kilfinny	0-09
2004	Knockaderry	1-10	Hospital/Herbertstown	0-10
2003	Feenagh-Kilmeedy	1-11	Castletown–Ballyagran	0-07
2002	Kildimo	2-08	Castletown–Ballyagran	0-11
2001	Newcastle West	1-11	Caherline	0-07
2000	Glenroe	1-09	Newcastle West	0-07
1999	Patrickswell	1-10	Newcastle West	1-07
1998	Granagh/Ballingarry	2-07	Newcastle West	1-08
1997	Monagea	2-08	Ballybrown	0-09
1996	Croom	2-12	Granagh/Ballingarry	0-06
1995	Dromin/Athlacca	4-11	Askeaton	1-06
1994	Ballybricken	2-11	Croom	1-07
1993	Dromcollogher-Broadford	0-09	Ballybricken	0-07
1992	Glenroe	2-09	Effin	2-06
1991	Knockainey		Ballybricken	
1990	Na Piarsaigh	2-10	Dromcollogher-Broadford	2-00
1989	Feenagh-Kilmeedy	4-10	Dromcollogher-Broadford	1-07
1988	Pallasgreen	2-11	Dromcollogher-Broadford	1-04
1987	Murroe		Feenagh-Kilmeedy	
1986	Castletown–Ballyagran		Feenagh-Kilmeedy	
1985	Ardagh		Feenagh-Kilmeedy	
1984	Garryspillane	0-08	Pallasgreen	0-07
1983	Hospital/Herbertstown	2-11	Ardagh	0-14
1982	Ardpatrick	2-05	Murroe	1-03
1981	Feohanagh/Castlemahon	-	Dromcollogher-Broadford	
1980	Boher		Kilfinane	
1979	Ballingarry		Feenagh-Kilmeedy	
1978	Garryspillane		Castletown–Ballyagran	
1977	Stakers		Murroe	
1976	Granagh		Staker Wallace	
1975	Treaty Sarsfields		Granagh	
1974	Glenroe		Caherline	
1973	Boher		Na Fianna	
1972	Kilteely Dromkeen		Ballybrown	
1971	Monaleen		Dromin/Athlacca	
1970	Garryspillane		Boher	
1969	Mungret/St. Paul's		Bruff	
1968	Pallasgreen		Rathkeale	
1967	Ballybrown		Doon	
1966	Bruree		Ballybrown	
1965	Croom		Boher	
1964	Adare	4-04 (R)	Croom	2-01 (R)
1963	Dromcollogher		Pallasgreen	
1962	Feenagh-Kilmeedy	5-11	Doon	2-06
1961	Monaleen		Rathkeale	
1960	Garryspillane		Feenagh-Kilmeedy	
1959	Dromcollogher		Murroe	
1958	Pallasgreen		Granagh/Ballingarry	
1957	Patrickswell		South Liberties	
1956	Kilmallock		South Liberties	
1955	Patrickswell		Pallasgreen	
1954	Feoghanagh		Kilmallock	
1953	Knockainey		South Liberties	
1952	Cappamore		Castletown	
1951	Bruree		South Liberties	
1950	Dromard/Rathkeale		Claughaun	
1949	Dromcollogher		Cappamore	
1948	Dromard-Rathkeale		Bruree	
1947	Knockaderry		Bruff	
1946	South Liberties		Castletown	
1945	Mungret/St. Paul's		Dromcollogher	
1944	Ballingarry		Kilfinane	
1943	Kilmallock		Claughaun	
1942	Granagh		Hospital	
1941	Doon		Treaty	
1940	Mungret/St. Paul's		Kilfinane	
1939	Kilmallock		Mungret/St. Paul's	
1938	Feenagh		Pallasgreen	
1937	Templeglantine		Doon	
1936	Mungret/St. Paul's		Hospital	
1935	Askeaton		Cappamore	
1934	St. Patrick's		Kilfinane	
1933	Kildimo		Kilmallock	
1932	Bohermore		Broadford	
1931	Caherline		Kilmallock	
1930	Ahane		Bruree	
1929	Claughaun	4-03	Knockaderry	2-03
1928	Ahane		Kilmeedy	
1927	Caherline		Kilmallock	
1926	Fedamore	1-04	Newcastle West	1-00
1925	Kilmallock	6-03	Murroe	4-01
1924	Treaty	7-07	Cappagh	3-00
1923	No Championship			
1922	Croom	4-03	Shamrocks	2-01
1921	No Championship			
1920	Young Irelands	8-00	Templeglantine	2-00
1919	Ballybricken	3-02	Young Irelands	2-02
1918	Claughaun	3-02	Shamrocks	3-00
1917	Murroe	3-02	Croom	3-01
1916	Granagh	3-05	Castleconnell	3-01
1915	Pallasgreen	2-04	Granagh	2-01
1914	Granagh	4-02	Castleconnell	3-01
1913	Ballybrown	6-02	Kilmallock	4-01
1912	Claughaun	3-01	Pallaskenry	2-01
1911	Commercials	5-01	Castleconnell	3-02
1910	Commercials	9-02	Fedamore	3-00
1909	Castleconnell	7-03	Kilmallock	2-01
1908	Commercials	7-02	South Liberties	1-08
1907	No Championship			
1906	Sarsfields	1-09	St. Patrick's	0-03
1905	St. Patrick's	2-04	Nationals	1-04
1904	Claughaun	4-11	Nationals	0-02
1903	No Championship			
1902	Treaty	2-11	St. Patrick's	1-05

== See also ==
- Limerick Senior Hurling Championship
- Limerick Intermediate Hurling Championship
- Limerick Premier Intermediate Hurling Championship
- Limerick Premier Junior A Hurling Championship
