= St Senan's GAA =

St Senan's GAA may refer to:

- St Senan's GAA (Clare), a sports club in Kilkee, Ireland
- St Senan's GAA (Kerry), a sports club near Listowel, Ireland
- St Senan's GAA (Limerick), a sports club in Foynes-Shanagolden-Robertstown, Ireland
