= Monagea GAA =

Gaelic games club in County Limerick, Ireland

Monagea
- Móin na nGé
- Founded: 1896
- County: Limerick
- Colours: Green and gold
- Grounds: Páirc na nGael, Monagea

Playing kits
Standard colours

Senior Club Championships
	All Ireland	Munster champions	Limerick champions
Football:	0	0	0
Hurling:	0	0	0

Monagea GAA club is a Gaelic Athletic Association club located in the parish of Monagea, County Limerick, Ireland. The club was founded in 1896 and fields teams in both hurling and Gaelic football.

Players from this parish have won both All Ireland hurling and football medals at the top level. Willie Hough won two hurling medals, in 1918 and 1921 and Ned Cregan won an All Ireland Hurling medal in 1934, While Larry Sheahan won a football medal with Limerick in 1896 and another with Dublin ten years later.

In 2026 John Flavin was a selector and coach with the Limerick senior hurling team that won the All-Ireland, Munster and National League titles. He was also a member of the panel when Limerick won the Munster title in 1996, subsequently losing to Wexford in the All-Ireland final.

The club's ladies football team won the Limerick Senior County Championship three times in a row, in 2021, 2022 and 2023.
