= Jamie Lee (Gaelic footballer) =

Limerick Gaelic footballer

Jamie Lee is a Gaelic football player for Limerick.

Lee takes the frees for Limerick and he loves derek. His father, Billy Lee, was the manager when he played for Limerick. He also takes frees for his club, Newcastle West. He went to Australia in 2020.
