= Castletown–Ballyagran GAA =

Gaelic sports club in County Limerick, Ireland

Castletown–Ballyagran
- Baile an Chaisleáin–Béal Átha Grean
- County: Limerick
- Nickname: CTB
- Colours
- Grounds: Paddy Carroll Memorial Park

Playing kits
Standard colours

Castletown–Ballyagran GAA is a Gaelic Athletic Association club in Ballyagran, County Limerick, Ireland. The club is affiliated to the Limerick County Board and fields teams in hurling and Gaelic football.

== History ==
Located in the village of Ballyagran, but also encompassing the Castletown and Colmanswell areas on the Limerick-Cork border, Castletown–Ballyagran GAA Club was established following an amalgamation between two existing clubs. The club has spent the majority of its existence operating in the junior grades. Castletown–Ballyagran's county honours include two Limerick JAHC titles, which were won in 1986 and 2025. The club also won the Limerick JBFC title in 1994.

== Honours ==
- Limerick Junior A Hurling Championship (2): 1986, 2025
- Limerick Junior B Football Championship (1): 1994
