= Glin, County Limerick =

Village in County Limerick, Ireland

Glin Irish: An Gleann
- Village
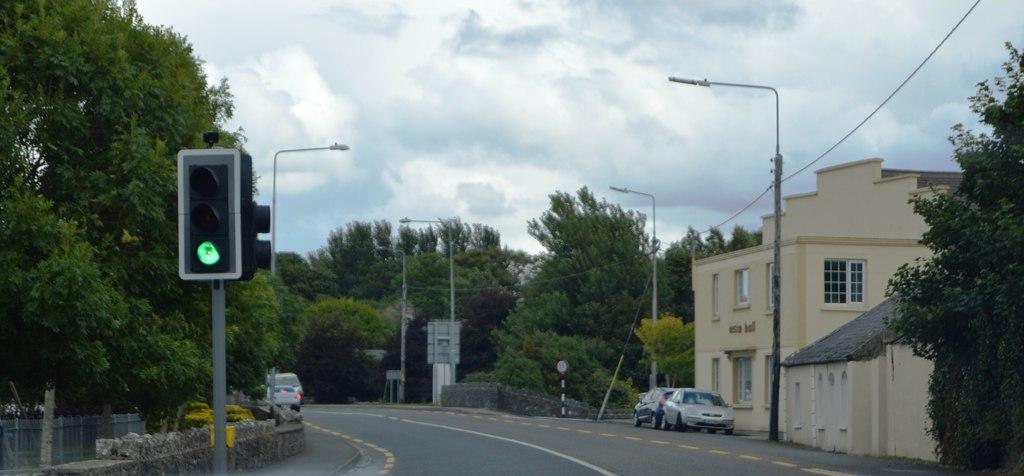
- The N69 road passes through Glin

- Location in Ireland
- Coordinates: 52°34′13″N 09°16′58″W
- Country: Ireland
- Province: Munster
- County: County Limerick

Population (2022)
  - Total: 644
- Time zone: UTC+0 (WET)
  - Summer (DST): UTC-1 (IST (WEST))

Glin (Irish: An Gleann, meaning 'the glen') is a village in the northwest of County Limerick, Ireland. It is on the south shore of the River Shannon's estuary, on the N69 road between Foynes and Tarbert. The population of the village at the 2022 census was 644.

== History ==
The lands around Glin were the manor of the Knight of Glin after the Norman invasion. Glin was not included in the Down Survey of the 1650s. The village, as it was then, was called Ballygullyhannane. Glin An Gleann was previously Gleann Corbraighe, "Valley of the Corbry", from the stream flowing through the village into the Shannon. Glin is in the barony of Shanid, formerly a division of the barony of Lower Connello. A road through the mountains south to Abbeyfeale was completed in 1836. Glin gave its name to a poor law union established in 1850. A workhouse was erected southeast of the village. In 1891, the poor law union was dissolved. In 1894, the workhouse became the site for a District School for boys, run by the Christian Brothers, and girls, run by the Sisters of Mercy. The workhouse closed in 1920, and the District School in 1924. In 1928, St Joseph's Industrial School for boys moved to the site from Sexton Street in Limerick. The industrial school, also run by the Christian Brothers, closed in 1966. Reports of abuse of the residents were documented by the 2009 report of the Commission to Inquire into Child Abuse.

=== Glin Castle ===
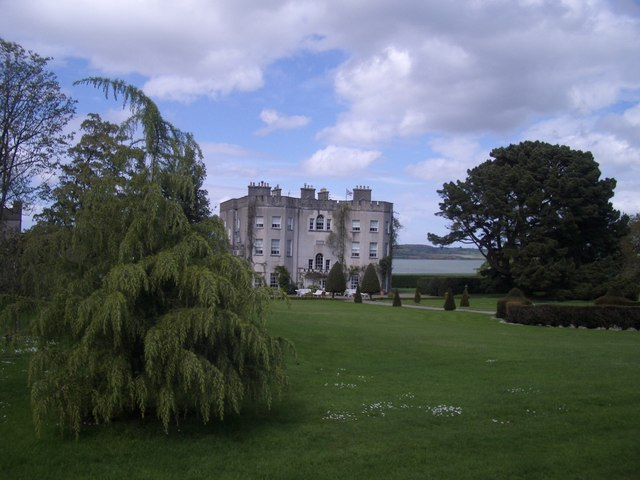
Glin Castle, with the River Shannon beyond

Upstream on the Corbry from the village is Glin Castle and demesne, the residence of the Knight of Glin and now a luxury hotel. The first castle they built was by Thomas Fitzgerald in Shanid around 1200. Its ruins are still visible. It was the home of the Knights of Glin from about 1260 until 1642, when a house was built near the site of the present castle. The present day castle was built between 1780 and 1790 by John Bateman. Although it is called a castle, it is actually a Georgian house. The contractor was a Mr. Sheehy and the stone was brought from Athea by horse drawn sledge. By 1798, the majority of the interior was finished but with the Fitzgeralds about to become bankrupt, the craftsmen downed tools and left the castle.

=== Industrial school monument ===
St Joseph's Industrial School, Ireland's second largest industrial school, was opened in Glin by the Christian Brothers in 1928. It closed in 1966. In March 2015, a monument to residents and survivors of abuse at this residential institution was erected in the town's heritage park. In 2009, the Child Abuse Commission, chaired by Judge Seán Ryan, described the school as having a "severe, systemic regime of corporal punishment". A statement, released by the Glin Project to mark the unveiling at the monument, said that the monument had "the support and goodwill of the vast majority of local people" and described the monument's inscription as representing a "clear and unambiguous apology by the Christian Brothers".

== Events ==
The fair days in Glin were 8 June, the first Wednesday in September, and 3 December, with a weekly market each Wednesday. Glin also holds an annual event known as the Swim to Clare where locals swim either to or from Clare to the local pier, depending on which way the tide is going. Cycling events are also held throughout the year, as the town is located off the main N69 road.

== Sport ==
The local Gaelic football club, Glin GAA club, won seven county football championships between 1926 and 1934. The club won the 2014 Limerick Junior Football title, later reaching the 2014 Munster Junior Club Football Championship final.
