= Commercials GAA (Limerick) =

Irish Gaelic Athletic Association club

Commercials GAA Club
- Na Seacadoiri
- Founded: 1884
- County: Limerick
- Colours: Green and Gold
- Grounds: Corkanree, Dock Road

Playing kits
Standard colours

Senior Club Championships
	All Ireland	Munster champions	Limerick champions
Football:	2	1	16

Commercials GAA was a Limerick Gaelic Athletic Association club which folded around 1990.

== History ==
Commercials were founded in 1884 by shop assistants working in the city. Many of its members came from County Limerick and surrounding counties. In the late 19th century, many shopworkers would have come from smallholder families as shop work was one of the few occupations open to rural Catholics with some education who had no land to inherit. Shopworkers were very active in nationalist and cultural organisations like the IRB, the Gaelic League and the GAA.

Commercials were a dominant football team in Limerick during the early days of the GAA, and won 16 county senior championships between 1887 and 1927. They won the first football All Ireland in 1887 defeating Young Irelands of Dundalk. The Limerick Commercials team in the 1887 All-Ireland football final (played on a field known as the "Big Bank" in Clonskeagh C. Dublin on 29 April 1888) was: Denis Corbett (goalkeeper and captain), Timothy Fitzgibbon, William Gunning, Richard Breen, John Hyland, Thomas McNamara, William J Spain (winner of an All-Ireland hurling medal with Dublin in 1889), Patrick J Corbett, Michael Slattery, Jeremiah R Kennedy, Michael Casey, James Mulqueen, Malachi O'Brien, Patrick Kelly, Timothy Kennedy, Philip Keating, William Cleary, Robert Normoyle, Patrick S Reeves, Thomas Keating, Thomas McMahon. Others to play for the team in previous rounds were Ned Nicholas, Edward Casey, Richard O'Brien, James Purcell, Thomas McLoughlin and Thomas Lynch. After trailing by 0-3 to 0-1 to the Dundalk team at half-time, they came back to win by 1-4 to 0-3.

Commercials added a second All Ireland title in 1896 defeating another Young Irelands from Dublin. They won a number of City Division junior football titles during the 1950s and appeared in a final for the last time in 1961. Young Irelands and Commercials joined in the 1950s as sister clubs with Young Irelands running the hurling and Commercials the football but with no field of their own and a hit and miss underage structure, they struggled to survive until they finally folded up around 1990.

== Roll of honour ==
- Limerick Senior Football Championship- 1887, 1888, 1889, 1895, 1896, 1897, 1898, 1899, 1902, 1904, 1905, 1910, 1911, 1919, 1920, 1927
- Limerick Junior Hurling Championship- 1908, 1910, 1911
- City Junior Football Championship- 1952,1953, 1954
- Limerick Juvenile Football Championship- 1969
- City Juvenile Football Championship- 1969
