= Treaty Sarsfields GAA =

- Founded: 1886
- County: Limerick
- Nickname: Sodacakes
- Colours: Royal Blue and White
- Grounds: Shelbourne Park, Limerick City
- Coordinates: 52°40′13″N 8°38′19″W

Playing kits
Standard colours

Senior Club Championships
	All Ireland	Munster champions	Limerick champions
Football:	0	0	12
Hurling:	0	0	4

Treaty Sarsfields was a Gaelic Athletic Association (GAA) club based in the Thomondgate area on the Northside of Limerick city, Ireland. The club participated in competitions organised by Limerick GAA county board.

The club was first founded as Treaty Stone before becoming Treaty from 1900-1943. Sarsfields split from Treaty in 1941 before merging again with Treaty in 1946 to become Treaty Sarsfields. The club folded in 1998.
