= Rathkeale GAA =

Gaelic sports club in County Limerick, Ireland

Rathkeale
- Ráth Caola
- Founded: 1885
- County: Limerick
- Colours: Blue and white
- Grounds: Seán Finn Park
- Coordinates: 52°31′40″N 8°56′56″W

Playing kits
Standard colours

Rathkeale GAA, formerly known as St Mary's/Seán Finn's GAA, is a Gaelic Athletic Association club in Rathkeale, County Limerick, Ireland. The club fields teams in both hurling and Gaelic football.

== History ==
Located in the town of Rathkeale, in west County Limerick, the club was founded as St Mary's GAA Club in 1885. It was later given the name of Sean C. Finn (1897–1921), a local Irish Republican Army commander who was killed in a battle with Black and Tans near Foynes in 1921. The club has spent most of its existence operating in the junior grades, winning West Limerick JAHC titles in 1968 and 2017. In Gaelic football terms, Rathkeale won the Limerick JAFC in 1991 before claiming their second title in 2011. Two years later the club won the Limerick IFC title after a 4-17 to 1-10 defeat of Oola in the final. Rathkeale won a second Limerick IFC title in 2024 and reclaimed top flight status once again.

== Honours ==
- Limerick Intermediate Football Championship (2): 2013, 2024
- Limerick Junior A Football Championship (2): 1991, 2011
- West Limerick Junior A Hurling Championship (2): 1968, 2017
- Munster Junior B Club Hurling Championship (1): 2009
