= Ballylanders GAA =

Gaelic football club in County Limerick, Ireland

- CLG Baile an Londraigh
- Founded: 1888
- County: Limerick
- Nickname: Bally
- Colours: Gold and Green
- Grounds: Kilfinane Road, Ballylanders

Playing kits
Standard colours

Senior Club Championships
	All Ireland	Munster champions	Limerick champions
Football:	0	0	4

Ballylanders GAA (Irish: CLG Baile an Londraigh) is a Gaelic Athletic Association (GAA) located in the parish of Ballylanders/Knockadea in County Limerick. The club was founded in 1888 and is solely a Gaelic football club as hurlers from the parish play with neighbouring Glenroe. They won the County Senior Football Championship on four occasions in 1917, 1999, 2007 and 2014.

== Location ==
Ballylanders is situated 45 km from Limerick City in the southeast of the county at the foot of the Galtee Mountains. Footballers from the neighbouring parish of Glenroe/Ballyorgan also play with the club. Neighbouring clubs include sister club Glenroe, Garryspillane, Galbally, Galtee Gaels and Mitchelstown in County Cork.

== History ==
Before the foundation of the GAA in 1884, Gaelic football was widely played in southeast County Limerick. There is an account and photograph of a Ballylanders Shamrocks team that played Aherlow. Bally won the County Junior Football Championship in 1911 beating Castlemahon in the final. The cup stayed in the parish for six years as the County Board did not run the championship during the First World War. Meanwhile, football grew rapidly in the parish and Ballylanders won their first County Senior Football Championship in 1917 beating Commercials. Several Ballylanders players were on the Limerick team that lost to Dublin in the same year.

During those early days of the GAA, Frank Dineen, a native of Ballylanders, was GAA president from 1885-1898 and was General Secretary from 1898-1901. Dineen, notably, bought a site in 1913 on Jones's Road that was later to become Croke Park. Ballylanders won a Junior Championship in 1920 and were beaten in the 1925 Senior final by Oola. The club were again Junior champions in 1933 beating Ahane but football was in decline at this time. In 1952, they won another Junior title beating Oola but again failed to build on it lasting just two years at senior. In the 1970s, Bally were senior and succeeded in winning a South Championship.

While the club did not have much success in the 1980s, in 1991 they joined with Galtee Gaels and Garryspillane under the Glenacurrane name and they won the County Senior Championship. In 1995, the club won Under-14, Minor and a Junior county title beating Gerald Griffins to win their fifth junior crown. In 1996, an Under-21 title was added. In 1998, Pallasgreen were defeated in the County Intermediate final and the following year Ballylanders won their first Senior Championship for eighty-one years when they beat Hospital-Herbertstown. The club's under-21 teams won County Championships in 2004 and 2006 respectively. A third Senior Championship was added in 2007 when Dromcollogher-Broadford were beaten. They reached the final again the following year but Drom-Broadford defeated Ballylanders. The club won an unprecedented fourteen South Senior Championships between 1998 and 2011 and continues to play at senior level.

== Grounds ==
Through the years Ballylanders GAA club rented various fields around the parish for training and matches. In the early days, Osborne's field was used where the daycare now stands. Lynch's field where Galtee Wood now stands was also used as well as Walshe's field. McGrath's field on the Galbally road was a mainstay. The club finally purchased a site on the Kilfinane road in 1981 and throughout the 1980s and 1990s the field and dressing rooms were developed. However, the club has since outgrown these facilities and has built a brand new clubhouse containing four dressing rooms and a multi purpose hall. The grounds is now known as Frank B. Dineen Park.

== Honours ==
- Limerick Senior Football Championship (4): 1917, 1999, 2007, 2014
- Limerick Junior Football Championship (5): 1911, 1920, 1933, 1952, 1995
