= Ballysteen =

Village in County Limerick, Ireland

Coordinates: 52.6464°N 8.9521°W

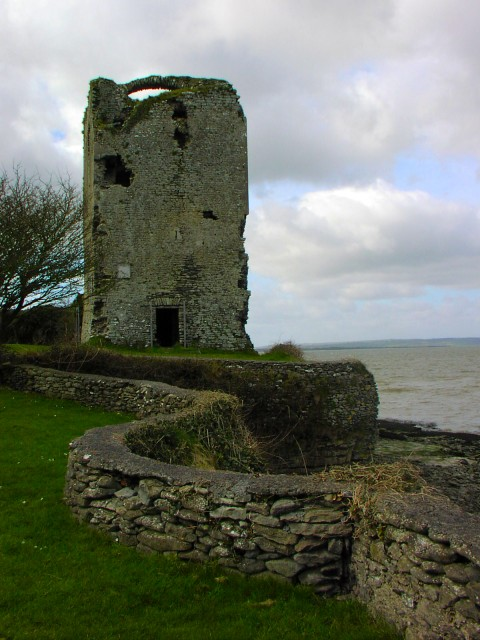
Beagh Castle, near Ballysteen

Ballysteen (Irish: Baile Stiabhna) is a small village and townland in County Limerick, Ireland. It is located in the civil parish of Iveruss and the historical barony of Kenry.

Evidence of ancient settlement in the area includes a number of ringfort, enclosure and tower house sites in the townlands of Ballysteen, Beagh, Ballinvoher and Issane. Beagh Castle, an outpost fortification built in the 13th century by the FitzGerald family, is located close to Ballysteen village. Ballysteen House, an 18th-century country house, is reputedly built on the site of the former Ballysteen Castle. The Catholic church in Ballysteen, which dates to 1861, is in the Roman Catholic Diocese of Limerick. The ruins of a 15th- or 16th-century chapel and churchyard are nearby in Beagh townland. Ballysteen's Carnegie library (constructed c. 1905) was restored in the early 21st century and is now a community and heritage centre.

Local sports clubs include Ballysteen GAA (a Gaelic Athletic Association club which fields teams in competitions organised by Limerick GAA), and Ballysteen AFC (an association football (soccer) club which participates in the Limerick Desmond League). The local primary school, Ballysteen National School, had an enrollment of 26 pupils as of 2024.
