= St Senan's GAA (Limerick) =

Gaelic games club in County Limerick, Ireland

- CLG Naomh Seanáin
- Founded: 1947
- County: Limerick
- Colours: Yellow and blue
- Grounds: Páirc Naomh Seanáin, Foynes

Playing kits
Standard colours

Senior Club Championships
	All Ireland	Munster champions	Limerick champions
Football:	0	0	1

St Senan's GAA club is a Gaelic Athletic Association club in the parish of Foynes-Shanagolden-Robertstown, County Limerick, Ireland. The club was founded in 1947 and fields teams solely in Gaelic football.

== Location ==
The club is located in the parish of Foynes-Shanagolden-Robertstown in west Limerick on the southern banks of the Shannon Estuary. The parish is roughly 40 km west of Limerick City on the N69 road. Neighbouring clubs include Askeaton and Ballysteen to the east, St Kieran's to the south and Gerald Griffin's to the west.

== History ==
Gaelic games have been played in the parish since the late 1880s. The Smith O'Briens team from Foynes were the first organised team and, in 1916, they beat Templeglantine 1-16 to 1-9 in the West final. The following year they went one better and won the only County Senior Football Championship title that ever came to the parish. They defeated the Commercials 1-5 to 0-4 at the Market's Field and were captained by John O'Connor.

During this era hurling was to the fore in the Robertstown and Barrigone areas of the parish. A team called the Liberators won numerous tournaments in the surrounding area. Shanagolden also had a football team called the Shanid Abú's in this era. Records don't give a lot about the period 1910 to 1924. In 1925 Foynes beat Glin 0-9 to 1-4 in the West Junior final and in 1930 Shanagolden won the same competition when they beat Abbeyfeale 1-3 to 0-4. In 1932, Shanagolden lost a final to Ballysteen but beat Foynes in a parish derby a year later by 1-5 to 1-4. This remains the only final contested by two teams from the parish. Foynes reached the County Senior Football final in 1936 but were beaten by the four in a row winning Ahane team of the era.

After Foynes's defeat to Mountcollins in the 1939 West junior final, a lean period hit the parish with no success coming from either Foynes or Shanagolden. The two clubs decided to merge in 1947 and the present-day club of St. Senan's was formed. The newly founded club won four West Under 16 Championships in a row from 1950–53 and a County Minor Football Championship in 1954.

In 1953 came the breakthrough of winning a first adult county title when Pallasgreen were defeated by 0-6 to 0-4 in the County Junior Football Championship final. Also in 1953, six Senan's men won a County Senior Football Championship with Western Gaels, an amalgamation of Rathkeale, Ballyhahill, Kilcolman and Senan's. West Minor titles were won in 1966 and 1967 but the County finals of the same years were both lost to Old Christians.

A second County Junior title was won in 1973 when the Saints beat Na Piarsaigh 1-10 to 1-7 captained by Joe Behan. A West Junior title was won in 1981 and a County title followed in 1986 as Senan's beat Kilteely-Dromkeen captained by Dónal Mulvihill. Promising underage teams in the 1990s led to a second County Premier Minor Football title in 1997 captained by Mike Flaherty. West Under-21 titles followed and in 2003 they were crowned County Intermediate Football champions after beating Pallasgreen after a replay.

The club went on to contest its first ever County Senior Football final in 2006 but were beaten by Fr. Casey's on a scoreline of 0-12 to 1-7. After nine years at senior level, Senan's were relegated to intermediate in 2012 and lost an Intermediate County final in 2014 to Na Piarsaigh.

== Notable people ==
- Pat Lane, who refereed the 1987 All-Ireland Senior Football Championship Final
- Ian Ryan, Gaelic footballer

== Honours ==
- Limerick Senior Football Championship Winners (1): 1907 (as Foynes Smith O'Briens).
- Limerick Senior Football Championship Runners Up (1) : 2006.
- Limerick Intermediate Football Championship (2): 2003, 2017
- Limerick Junior Football Championship (7): 1953, 1973, 1986
- Limerick Premier Minor Football Championship (2): 1954, 1997
