= Askeaton GAA =

Gaelic sports club in County Limerick, Ireland

Askeaton
- Eas Geitine
- Founded: 1891
- County: Limerick
- Colours: Green and gold
- Grounds: Askeaton Gaelic Grounds
- Coordinates: 52°35′58″N 8°58′1″W

Playing kits
Standard colours

Senior Club Championships
	All Ireland	Munster champions	Limerick champions
Football:	0	0	3
Hurling:	0	0	0

Askeaton GAA club is a Gaelic Athletic Association club based in the village of Askeaton in County Limerick, Ireland. The club participates in competitions organized by the Limerick GAA county board.

== History ==
The pitch played host to Munster football championship games in 1970, (1987- 1991) known as Páirc na nGael.

== Achievements ==
- Limerick Senior Football Championship: (3) 1965, 1966, 1972
- Limerick Minor Football Championship: (4) 1959, 1960, 1975, 1976
- Limerick Junior Hurling Championship: (1) 1935
- Limerick Intermediate Football Championship: (1) 1992
