= St Kieran's GAA (Limerick) =

Gaelic clubs in Ireland

St Kieran's
- Naomh Ciaráin
- Founded: 1972
- County: Limerick
- Colours: Green and yellow
- Grounds: St Kieran's Park

Playing kits
Standard colours

Senior Club Championships
	All Ireland	Munster champions	Limerick champions
Football:	0	0	1

St Kieran's GAA is a Gaelic Athletic Association club based in Coolcappagh the combined parishes of Ardagh-Carrigkerry and Coolcappa-Kilcolman in County Limerick, Ireland. The club fields teams in both Gaelic football and hurling. St Kieran's are a member of the west division of Limerick GAA, its home grounds being located at St Kieran's Park, Coolcappa.

== History ==
St. Kieran's was formed in 1972 as a result of an amalgamation between the Ardagh, Carrigkerry, Coolcappagh and Kilcolman clubs into a single unit. The club instantly became a force in terms of Gaelic football and contested five Limerick SFC finals between 1972 and 1978, however, they failed to claim the title. St Kieran's won their first SFC title in 1981, before adding further honours in 1985 and 1990. The club has also enjoyed hurling success, winning Limerick JHC titles in 2012 and 2022.

== Honours ==
- Limerick Senior Football Championship (3): 1981, 1985, 1990
- Limerick Junior Hurling Championship (2): 2012, 2022
