= Ballysteen GAA =

Gaelic games club in County Limerick, Ireland

Ballysteen
- Baile Stiabhna
- Founded: 1890
- County: Limerick
- Nickname: Ballistinians
- Colours: Green and Gold
- Grounds: Ballinacourty, Ballysteen
- Coordinates: 52°38′45″N 8°56′12″W

Playing kits
Standard colours

Senior Club Championships
	All Ireland	Munster champions	Limerick champions
Football:	0	0	1
Hurling:	0	0	0

Ballysteen GAA is a Gaelic Athletic Association club based in Ballysteen, County Limerick, Ireland. The club participates in competitions organised by Limerick GAA. In Gaelic football, the club has contested senior competitions since 2009, having been promoted following a win in the 2008 Limerick Intermediate Football Championship final.

== Honours ==
- Limerick Senior Football Championship (1): 1964
- Limerick Intermediate Football Championship (1): 2008
- Limerick Junior A Football Championship (3): 1946, 1961, 1979
- Limerick Junior B Football Championship (1): 2001
- Limerick Junior A Football League (1): 2001
- Limerick Minor B Football Championship (1): 2008
- Limerick Under-21 B Football Championship (1): 2012
- West Limerick Senior Football Championship (2): 2013, 2017
- West Limerick Intermediate Football Championship (1): 2004
