= Newcastle West GAA =

Gaelic sports club in County Limerick, Ireland

Newcastle West
- An Caisleán Nua Thiar
- Founded: 1887
- County: Limerick
- Nickname: The Magpies, NCW
- Colours: Black and white
- Grounds: Newcastle West
- Coordinates: 52°27′09″N 9°03′51″W

Playing kits
Standard colours

Senior Club Championships
	All Ireland	Munster champions	Limerick champions
Football:	0	0	7
Hurling:	0	0	2
Camogie:	0	0	6

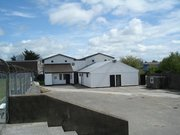
Newcastle West Club Rooms

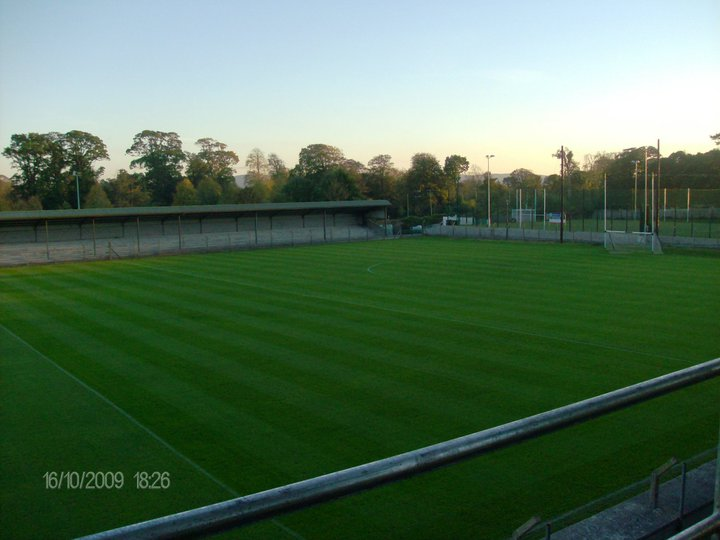
Newcastlewest GAA Field

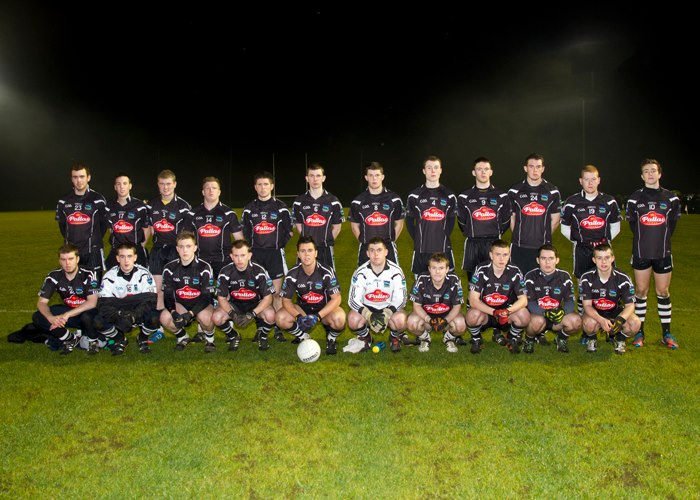
Limerick County U21 Champions 2012

Newcastle West GAA club is a Gaelic Athletic Association club located in Newcastle West, County Limerick, Ireland. The club was founded in 1887 and fields teams in Hurling, Camogie and Gaelic football.

== History ==
Caisleain Nua Thiar Gaa Club was founded in 1897. Its early years were lean as Newcastle West did not emerge until 1908, when it reached the Senior final with Kilmallock, losing 2-08 to 0-3. Newcastle West footballers were still playing senior football through the 1900s up to 1928, where Glin beat them in the west final of that year by 0-12 to 0-01.

As a hurling club, they had no success prior to World War I. However from 1917 to 1933, Newcastle West were a force to be reckoned with, winning west titles and contesting 7 senior county finals during this period, winning in 1917 vs. Young Irelands (3-4 to 3-1) and in 1925 vs. Buff (3-2 to 1-2). The 1918 decider vs. Claughan was not played and they played second fiddle to Young Irelands in 1920 (5-4 to 1-1), Claughan in 1926 (1-4 to 5-3), and Young Irelands again both in 1930 (2-2 to 1-4) and 1932 (1-3 to 2-6). Their golden age in top flight Hurling ended in 1932. The late 1930s they found success for minor hurlers, winning a first county title in that grade, beating Claughan 7-5 to 0-1, and they reclaimed the County Junior Football title in 1938 beating Killmallock 0-4 to 0-3.

The 1940s began with a win in a West minor hurling title, while losing the county final to Ahane (6-1 to 3-1). This title, along with a West Junior Football title in 1945, were its only successes on the GAA Field until 1949, when another minor hurling team won a west title.

In the 1950s they met success in the west, both in minor hurling and football and junior football. The major change was the acquisition and development of the field in the Demesne.

In the 1960s they won the County junior final, beating Monaleen 2-2 to 2-0, and the club continued this success on the football field with a win in the West minor final in 1962, beating Abbeyfeale 3-5 to 2-7 and in 1965 winning the U21 beating Glin 2-3 to 0-4. A fourth County junior football title was secured in 1966, beating St Patrick’s 1-12 to 1-5. Progress was also made in the game of hurling, winning west minor titles in 1960, 1961 and 1965.

Bord Na N'og emerged in the 1970s, for under-16s. They won a county U21 Football Championship in 1975, beating Na Piarsaigh 1-6 to 1-5. Newcastle won West Senior Football titles in 1971 and 1972, beating Glin and Askeaton, respectively. The footballers lost the county Senior Football title in 1972 to Askeaton.

In the 1980s, the club enjoyed success in hurling and football field with many dual stars. These players won a number of county titles including Minor Hurling in 1982, Minor football in 1980 and 1983, U21 hurling in 1985, U21 football in 1980, 1981, 1983, 1984 and 1987 and the Senior county football title in 1987. In the juvenile section, after the success of the 1980s hurling declined and the club went from senior to junior. Football remained strong and it won a second county title in 1992 along with multiple west championships. The hurling decline was later addressed by winning Juvenile County’s through the 1990s in all age groups.

The club celebrated a county junior hurling win in 2001. They experienced success at under-age level through the 2000s. A county senior football appearance in 2004 was followed by relegation in 2005. However a county Intermediate Football final win was celebrated in 2006. Through the late 2000s, success came in both minor hurling and football along with U-21 football. The senior footballers contested the Senior County Football Finals of 2011 and 2012, losing in 2011 to Monaleen and in 2012 to Drom-Broadford after a replay. In 2012, the club scored Junior B County Football League and Championship double and Premier Under-21 Football titles. The club also won two more u21 premier Football Championships, feeding the senior footballers with an extremely talented group of players for the coming years. In 2015 Newcastle won their first senior title in 23 years with a 2-10 to 0-9 win over Drom-Broadford. On 27 October 2019, the club's senior footballers won their fourth county senior championship title, defeating Oola. On 22 December 2019, the under-21 footballers won the U21 Premier Football Championship, completing the first back-to-back at this level since 1987/88. The club reached the premier intermediate grade in hurling for the first time ever, winning the 2020 County Intermediate Championship final against Na Piarsaigh.

== Notable players ==
- Jamie Lee
- Willie Hough 1918 All-Ireland Senior Hurling Championship winning captain.

== Honours ==
=== Hurling ===
County

- Limerick Senior Hurling Championship: (2) 1917, 1925
- Limerick Intermediate Hurling Championship: (2) 2020, 2024
- Limerick Junior Hurling Championship: (1) 2001
- Limerick Junior B Hurling Championship (2) 1997, 2003
- Limerick Under-21 A Hurling Championship (2) 1985, 2018
- Limerick Under-21 B Hurling Championship (1) 1996
- Limerick Minor A Hurling Championship (2) 1937, 1982
- Limerick Junior B Hurling League (1) 2019

West

- West Limerick Senior Hurling Championship: (6) 1920, 1922, 1925, 1926, 1930, 1932
- West Limerick Intermediate Hurling Championship: (4) 2012, 2017, 2018, 2019
- West Limerick Junior Hurling Championship: (6) 1926, 1996, 1997, 1998, 2000, 2001
- West Limerick Junior B Hurling Championship (3) 1996, 1997, 2003
- West Limerick Junior B Hurling League (1) 2019
- West Limerick U21 A Hurling Championship (2) 1984, 1985, 2018
- West Limerick U21 B Hurling Championship (1) 1996, 2000
- West Limerick Minor A Hurling Championship (18) 1937, 1940, 1949, 1952, 1956, 1960, 1961, 1965, 1981, 1982, 1983, 1984, 1985, 1987, 1991, 2008, 2013, 2014
- West Limerick Juvenile Hurling Championship (1) 1955

=== Football ===
County

- Limerick Senior Football Championship: (7) 1987, 1992, 2015, 2019, 2021, 2022, 2023
- Limerick Senior Football League: (5) 2016, 2017, 2018, 2019, 2022
- Limerick Intermediate Football Championship: (1) 2006
- Limerick Junior Football Championship (5) 1901, 1938, 1960, 1966, 1912
- Limerick Under-21 Premier Football Championship (12) 1975, 1980, 1981, 1983, 1984, 1987, 1988, 2012, 2014, 2016, 2018, 2019
- Limerick Minor Football Championship (5) 1980, 1983, 2009, 2013, 2015
- Limerick Minor A Football Championship (2) 1998, 2003
- Limerick Juvenile Football Championship (2) 1980, 1982, 2011, 2015

West

- West Limerick Senior Football Championship: (9) 1908, 1920, 1925, 1971, 1972, 1987, 2014, 2016, 2021
- West Limerick Junior Football Championship: (6) 1938, 1945, 1951, 1959, 1960, 1966
- West Limerick Under-21 A Football Championship (12) 1965, 1975, 1977, 1980, 1981, 1983, 1984, 1985, 1987, 1988, 2008, 2009
- West Limerick Minor A Football Championship (9) 1945, 1949, 1951, 1962, 1978, 1979, 1980, 1983, 1987, 2018
- West Limerick Juvenile Football Championship (5) 1958, 1980, 1982, 1983, 1984

=== Camogie ===
County

- Limerick Senior Camogie Championship: (6) 2019, 2021, 2023, 2024, 2025, 2026
