= Glin GAA =

Gaelic games club in County Limerick, Ireland

Glin
- An Gleann
- Founded: 1898
- County: Limerick
- Nickname: The Magpies
- Colours: Black and white
- Grounds: Páirc Uí Chathaláin, Glin, County Limerick
- Coordinates: 52.5637°N 9.2822°W

Playing kits
Standard colours

Senior Club Championships
	All Ireland	Munster champions	Limerick champions
Football:	-	-	7

Glin GAA (Irish: An Gleann CLG) is a Gaelic Athletic Association (GAA) club based in Glin, County Limerick, Ireland. Glin GAA club was founded in 1898 under the name of Glin Emmetts, in commemoration of Robert Emmett who played a major role in the 1798 rebellion a century earlier. The club's rivals include Fr. Caseys, Newcastle West and as of 2009, Mountcollins.

== History ==
=== Early achievements ===
Records show that football and hurling had been played previously (possibly under the team name of a Thomas Davis) but these games were quite rough and unorganised. Glin reached the county final of 1903 but lost to a Commercials side.

After many years in decline, the arrival of Father Patrick Lyons as curate to the parish in 1926 heralded a revival of fortunes for Glin. This began with the club winning the Junior and Senior Football championships of 1926. The club went on to win seven county football championships between 1926 and 1934.

=== Late 20th century ===
In 1957, a combination of Glin and Ballyhahill (under the title of Glin Rangers) won the County Junior Championship. The following year in 1958, Glin won the Junior Championship again, this time on their own. In 1984, Glin won the County Junior Championship again.

1990 was a successful year for Glin as regards hurling. Despite hurling having an almost non-existent profile, Glin won an U16 county title, defeating South Liberties in the final.

In 1998, it celebrated its centenary with a contest between Kerry, (the then reigning All- Ireland Champions) and Sligo.

=== Early 21st century ===
In 2007, the club was relegated from Intermediate to Junior A grade after a poor season. The following year, the team won the Junior A West Limerick Championship but were knocked out the county semi-final stage. They contested the 2008 West Limerick final against Mountcollins, with the sides finishing level at 1-12 apiece after extra time. The replay on 17 October 2008 finished in a one-point win for Mountcollins 0-12 to 0-11. The team were still able to participate in the county championship and, on 28 October 2008, defeated Ballygran in Newcastle West by 5 points. The county junior A football final was played on Sunday 15 November 2008, and ended in a draw. The replay was set for Páirc na Gael on Friday night, 20 November 2008. The result after extra time was Mountcollins 0-12, Glin 0-11.

In 2011, Glin had championship victories over Drom-Broadford, Castlemahon and Father Casey's. However the year ended with defeat to Seán Finn's in the County Final and Feohanagh-Castlemahon in the County League Final. In 2012, Glin's championship challenge came to a conclusion when they went down by two points in the county semi-final to Cappamore, the eventual winners.

2013 saw the appointment of new management. In 2013, Shannon Gaels, a combination of Glin and Gerald Griffins, captured the County U21 A title.

In 2014, the side won the West final by defeating Fr. Casey's 2-12 to 0-07. In the 2014 County final, the scoreline was Glin 0-14 to Kilteely Dromkeen's 0-09 marking club's first last Junior county championship title in 30 years. Next up was a 2014 Munster quarter final against Tipperary champions Inane Rovers who were defeated on a scoreline of 1-12 to 2-08; and then the Waterford county champions Kill in the Munster semi final, winning by 1-08 to 0-08. In the Munster final against Brosna from Kerry, in front of 3,500 supporters, the team were defeated by 3 points.

== Notable intercounty players ==
During the late 1920s and early 1930s, Glin supplied several intercounty footballers, including Thomas Culhane, Johnny Kelly and Seamus Duggan. In the 1960s, Thomas McKeon played for Limerick in the Munster Senior Football Championship. Liam Long also played for Limerick in the late 1980s and 1990s, appearing in the 1991 Munster final against Kerry. The last Glin footballer to represent Limerick at senior level was Noelie Mulvihill in a 1999 Munster Championship first-round game against Cork.

== Honours ==
- Munster Junior Club Football Championship (0): (Runners-Up in 2014)
- Limerick Senior Football Championship (7): 1926, 1928, 1929, 1930, 1931, 1933, 1934
- Limerick Intermediate Football Championship (1): 1995
- Limerick Junior Football Championship (4): 1926, 1954, 1984, 2014
- West Limerick Junior Football Championship (5): 2008, 2009, 2010, 2013, 2014

== See also ==
- List of Gaelic games clubs in Ireland
