= Limerick Senior Football Championship =

Annual Gaelic football competition

- Current season or competition: 2026 Limerick Senior Football Championship
- Irish: Craobh Peile Sinsear Chontae Luimnigh
- Code: Football
- Founded: 1887
- Title holders: Father Casey's, Abbeyfeale (9th title)
- Most titles: Commercials (16 titles)
- Sponsors: Irish Wire Products

The Limerick Senior Football Championship is an annual Gaelic football competition contested by the top Limerick GAA clubs. The champions qualify to represent Limerick in the Munster Senior Club Football Championship, the winners of which progress to the All-Ireland Senior Club Football Championship.

The series of games are played during the summer and autumn months with the county final currently being played at the Gaelic Grounds in October. The prize for the winning team is the Fr. Casey Cup. Initially played as a knock-out competition, the championship currently uses a round robin format followed by a knock-out stage.

The Limerick County Championship is an integral part of the wider Munster Senior Club Football Championship. The winners of the Limerick County final join the champions of the other Munster football counties to contest the provincial championship.

Twelve teams currently participate in the Limerick County Championship. The all-time record-holders are Commercials, who have won a total of 16 titles.

== Roll of Honour ==
=== By club ===
| # | Club | Titles | Runners-up | Championships won | Championships runner-up |
|---|---|---|---|---|---|
| 1 | Commercials | 16 | 6 | 1887, 1888, 1889, 1895, 1896, 1897, 1898, 1899, 1902, 1904, 1905, 1910, 1911, 1919, 1920, 1927 | 1890, 1891, 1907, 1914, 1915, 1917 |
| 2 | Claughaun | 14 | 11 | 1955, 1959, 1967, 1969, 1970, 1971, 1982, 1984, 1986, 1988, 1989, 1993, 1995, 1996 | 1949, 1951, 1952, 1956, 1962, 1963, 1966, 1981, 1985, 1987, 1990 |
| 3 | Treaty Sarsfields | 12 | 8 | 1946, 1948, 1949, 1950, 1951, 1952, 1956, 1957, 1963, 1973, 1974, 1975 | 1941, 1953, 1954, 1955, 1959, 1960, 1965, 1968 |
| 4 | Father Casey's, Abbeyfeale | 9 | 17 | 1914, 1915, 1932, 1941, 1942, 1947, 2000, 2006, 2026 | 1898, 1900, 1904, 1911, 1916, 1918, 1922, 1935, 1938, 1940, 1946, 1994, 1995, 1996, 1998, 2009, 2024 |
| 5 | Glin | 7 | 6 | 1926, 1928, 1929, 1930, 1931, 1933, 1934 | 1899, 1909, 1910, 1927, 1937, 1939 |
| 5 | Newcastle West | 7 | 6 | 1987, 1992, 2015, 2019, 2021, 2022, 2023 | 1908, 1920, 2004, 2011, 2012, 2017 |
| 5 | Dromcollogher/Broadford | 7 | 4 | 2001, 2003, 2004, 2008, 2009, 2012, 2013 | 2000, 2007, 2015, 2016 |
| 6 | Oola | 6 | 5 | 1900, 1918, 1922, 1925, 1961, 1979 | 1970, 1971, 1976, 1980, 2019 |
| 6 | Monaleen | 6 | 1 | 1978, 2002, 2005, 2010, 2011, 2016 | 2013 |
| 7 | St. Patrick's | 5 | 5 | 1890, 1891, 1943, 1944, 1954 | 1947, 1948, 1964, 1967, 2014 |
| 7 | Ahane | 5 | 0 | 1935, 1936, 1937, 1938, 1939 | |
| 8 | Adare | 4 | 5 | 2017, 2018, 2020, 2024 | 2002, 2008, 2021, 2022, 2023 |
| 8 | Ballylanders | 4 | 4 | 1917, 1999, 2007, 2014 | 1925, 2008, 2018, 2020 |
| 9 | St. Kieran's | 3 | 10 | 1981, 1985, 1990 | 1972, 1973, 1974, 1975, 1978, 1983, 1986, 1988, 1989, 2005 |
| 9 | Askeaton | 3 | 3 | 1965, 1966, 1972 | 1905, 1979, 1984 |
| 9 | Kilmallock | 3 | 1 | 1908, 1909, 1916 | 1950 |
| 9 | Galbally | 3 | 1 | 1958, 1994, 1997 | 1969 |
| 10 | Garda | 2 | 1 | 1924, 1958 | 1926 |
| 10 | Western Gaels | 2 | 1 | 1953, 1960 | 1961 |
| 10 | Croom | 2 | 1 | 1976, 1983 | 1977 |
| 10 | Thomond College | 2 | 0 | 1977, 1980 | |
| 11 | Knockane | 1 | 6 | 1940 | 1902, 1928, 1929, 1930, 1931, 1942 |
| 11 | Army (Ninth Desmonds) | 1 | 1 | 1945 | 1943 |
| 11 | Mungret St Paul's | 1 | 1 | 2025 | 2001 |
| 11 | Foynes | 1 | 1 | 1907 | 1936 |
| 11 | Athea | 1 | 1 | 1968 | 2003 |
| 11 | University of Limerick | 1 | 1 | 1998 | 1997 |
| 11 | Ballysteen | 1 | 0 | 1964 | |
| 11 | Old Christians | 1 | 0 | 1962 | |
| 11 | Glencurrane Rovers | 1 | 0 | 1991 | |
| 12 | Hospital-Herbertstown | 0 | 4 | | 1991, 1992, 1993, 1999 |
| 12 | Pallasgreen | 0 | 3 | | 1897, 1957, 1958 |
| 12 | Ballynahill | 0 | 2 | | 1919, 1944 |
| 12 | St Michaels | 0 | 2 | | 1887, 1888 |
| 12 | Newtown Rangers | 0 | 2 | | 1933, 1934 |
| 12 | St Johns | 0 | 1 | | 1889 |
| 12 | Deel Rangers | 0 | 1 | | 1895 |
| 12 | Glenroe | 0 | 1 | | 1896 |
| 12 | Rathkeale | 0 | 1 | | 1924 |
| 12 | Kilbehenny | 0 | 1 | | 1932 |
| 12 | Na Piarsaigh | 0 | 1 | | 1982 |
| 12 | St Senan's | 0 | 1 | | 2006 |
| 12 | Kildimo-Pallaskenry | 0 | 1 | | 2026 |

== List of Finals ==
=== List of Limerick SFC finals ===
| Year | Winners | | Runners-up | |
| Year | Club | Score | Club | Score |
|---|---|---|---|---|
| 2026 | Father Casey's, Abbeyfeale | 0-16 | Kildimo-Pallaskenry | 2-08 |
| 2025 | Mungret St. Paul's | 0-12 | Newcastle West | 1-05 |
| 2024 | Adare | 1-10 | Father Casey's, Abbeyfeale | 0-08 |
| 2023 | Newcastle West | 3-05 | Adare | 0-13 |
| 2022 | Newcastle West | 1-11 | Adare | 2-05 |
| 2021 | Newcastle West | 1-08 | Adare | 0-05 |
| 2020 | Adare | 4-07 | Ballylanders | 0-04 |
| 2019 | Newcastle West | 1-11 | Oola | 0-08 |
| 2018. | Adare | 1-13 | Ballylanders | 0-12 |
| 2017 | Adare | 2-10 | Newcastle West | 1-10 |
| 2016 | Monaleen | 2-14 | Dromcollogher-Broadford | 1-11 |
| 2015 | Newcastle West | 2-10 | Dromcollogher-Broadford | 0-09 |
| 2014 | Ballylanders | 2-08 | St. Patrick's | 0-07 |
| 2013 | Dromcollogher-Broadford | 2-09 | Monaleen | 2-07 |
| 2012 | Dromcollogher-Broadford | 0-13 | Newcastle West | 2-07 |
| 2012 Replay | Dromcollogher-Broadford | 0-12 | Newcastle West | 0-10 |
| 2011 | Monaleen | 1-12 | Newcastle West | 1-07 |
| 2010 | Monaleen | 1-09 | Adare | 1-05 |
| 2009 | Dromcollogher-Broadford | 0-09 | Father Casey's, Abbeyfeale | 0-07 |
| 2008 | Dromcollogher-Broadford | 2-15 | Ballylanders | 1-08 |
| 2007 | Ballylanders | 2-13 | Dromcollogher-Broadford | 1-03 |
| 2006 | Father Casey's, Abbeyfeale | 0-12 | St Senan's | 1-07 |
| 2005 | Monaleen | 0-13 | St. Kieran's | 2-05 |
| 2004 | Dromcollogher-Broadford | 0-09, 1-07 (R) | Newcastle West | 0-09, 0-03 (R) |
| 2003 | Dromcollogher-Broadford | 1-12 | Athea | 0-07 |
| 2002 | Monaleen | 1-07 / 1-10 replay | Adare | 0-10 / 1-09 replay |
| 2001 | Dromcollogher-Broadford | 1-14 | Mungret/St Paul's | 0-05 |
| 2000 | Father Casey's, Abbeyfeale | | Dromcollogher-Broadford | |
| 1999 | Ballylanders | 1-15 | Hospital-Herbertstown | 0-09 |
| 1998 | University of Limerick | | Father Casey's, Abbeyfeale | |
| 1997 | Galbally | | University of Limerick | |
| 1996 | Claughaun | | Father Casey's, Abbeyfeale | |
| 1995 | Claughaun | | Father Casey's, Abbeyfeale | |
| 1994 | Galbally | | Father Casey's, Abbeyfeale | |
| 1993 | Claughaun | | Hospital-Herbertstown | |
| 1992 | Newcastle West | | Hospital-Herbertstown | |
| 1991 | Glenacurrane Rovers | | Hospital-Herbertstown | |
| 1990 | St. Kieran's | 0-10 | Claughaun | 0-07 |
| 1989 | Claughaun | | St. Kieran's | |
| 1988 | Claughaun | | St. Kieran's | |
| 1987 | Newcastle West | 4-06 | Claughaun | 1-05 |
| 1986 | Claughaun | | St. Kieran's | |
| 1985 | St. Kieran's | 2-14 | Claughaun | 2-04 |
| 1984 | Claughaun | | Askeaton | |
| 1983 | Croom | | St. Kieran's | |
| 1982 | Claughaun | | Na Piarsaigh | |
| 1981 | St. Kieran's | 1-09 | Claughaun | 1-02 |
| 1980 | Thomond College | | Oola | |
| 1979 | Oola | | Askeaton | |
| 1978 | Monaleen | | St. Kieran's | |
| 1977 | Thomond College | | Croom | |
| 1976 | Croom | | Oola | |
| 1975 | Treaty Sarsfields | | St. Kieran's | |
| 1974 | Treaty Sarsfields | | St. Kieran's | |
| 1973 | Treaty Sarsfields | | St. Kieran's | |
| 1972 | Askeaton | | St. Kieran's | |
| 1971 | Claughaun | | Oola | |
| 1970 | Claughaun | | Oola | |
| 1969 | Claughaun | | Galbally | |
| 1968 | Athea | 2-05 | Treaty Sarsfields | 0-04 |
| 1967 | Claughaun | | St. Patrick's | |
| 1966 | Askeaton | | Claughaun | |
| 1965 | Askeaton | | Treaty Sarsfields | |
| 1964 | Ballysteen | | St. Patrick's | |
| 1963 | Treaty Sarsfields | | Claughaun | |
| 1962 | Old Christians | | Claughaun | |
| 1961 | Oola | | Western Gaels | |
| 1960 | Western Gaels | | Treaty Sarsfields | |
| 1959 | Claughaun | | Treaty Sarsfields | |
| 1958 | Garda | | Pallasgreen | |
| 1957 | Treaty Sarsfields | | Pallasgreen | |
| 1956 | Treaty Sarsfields | | Claughaun | |
| 1955 | Claughaun | | Treaty Sarsfields | |
| 1954 | St. Patrick's | | Treaty Sarsfields | |
| 1953 | Western Gaels | | Treaty Sarsfields | |
| 1952 | Treaty Sarsfields | | Claughaun | |
| 1951 | Treaty Sarsfields | | Claughaun | |
| 1950 | Treaty Sarsfields | | Kilmallock | |
| 1949 | Treaty Sarsfields | | Claughaun | |
| 1948 | Treaty Sarsfields | | St. Patrick's | |
| 1947 | Abbeyfeale | | St. Patrick's | |
| 1946 | Treaty Sarsfields | | Abbeyfeale | |
| 1945 | 9th Desmond, Army | | St. Patrick's | |
| 1944 | St. Patrick's | | Ballyhahill | |
| 1943 | St. Patrick's | | 9th Desmond, Army | |
| 1942 | Abbeyfeale | | Knockane | |
| 1941 | Abbeyfeale | | Treaty Sarsfields | |
| 1940 | Knockane | | Abbeyfeale | |
| 1939 | Ahane | | Glin | |
| 1938 | Ahane | | Abbeyfeale | |
| 1937 | Ahane | | Glin | |
| 1936 | Ahane | | Foynes | |
| 1935 | Ahane | | Abbeyfeale | |
| 1934 | Glin | | Newtown Rangers | |
| 1933 | Glin | | Newtown Rangers | |
| 1932 | Abbeyfeale | | Kilbehenny | |
| 1931 | Glin | | Knockane | |
| 1930 | Glin | | Knockane | |
| 1929 | Glin | | Knockane | |
| 1928 | Glin | | Knockane | |
| 1927 | Commercials | | Glin | |
| 1926 | Glin | | Garda | |
| 1925 | Oola | | Ballylanders | |
| 1924 | Garda | | Rathkeale | |
| 1923 | No Championship | | | |
| 1922 | Oola | | Abbeyfeale | |
| 1921 | No Championship | | | |
| 1920 | Commercials | | Newcastle West | |
| 1919 | Commercials | | Ballyhahill | |
| 1918 | Oola | | Abbeyfeale | |
| 1917 | Ballylanders | | Commercials | |
| 1916 | Kilmallock | | Abbeyfeale | |
| 1915 | Abbeyfeale | | Commercials | |
| 1914 | Abbeyfeale | | Commercials | |
| 1913 | No Championship | | | |
| 1912 | No Championship | | | |
| 1911 | Commercials | | Abbeyfeale | |
| 1910 | Commercials | | Glin | |
| 1909 | Kilmallock | | Glin | |
| 1908 | Kilmallock | | Newcastle West | |
| 1907 | Foynes | | Commercials | |
| 1906 | No Championship | | | |
| 1905 | Commercials | | Askeaton | |
| 1904 | Commercials | | Abbeyfeale | |
| 1903 | No Championship | | | |
| 1902 | Commercials | | Knockane | |
| 1901 | No Championship | | | |
| 1900 | Oola | | Abbeyfeale | |
| 1899 | Commercials | | Glin | |
| 1898 | Commercials | | Abbeyfeale | |
| 1897 | Commercials | | Pallasgreen | |
| 1896 | Commercials | | Glenroe | |
| 1895 | Commercials | | Deel Rangers | |
| 1894 | No Championship | | | |
| 1893 | No Championship | | | |
| 1892 | No Championship | | | |
| 1891 | St. Patrick's | | Commercials | |
| 1890 | St. Patrick's | | Commercials | |
| 1889 | Commercials | | St. John's | |
| 1888 | Commercials | | St. Michael's | |
| 1887 | Commercials | | St. Michael's | |

== See also ==
- Limerick Intermediate Football Championship (Tier 2)
- Limerick Senior Hurling Championship
