= Pallasgreen GAA =

Gaelic sports club in County Limerick, Ireland

- CLG - Pailís Ghréine
- Founded: 1887
- County: Limerick
- Nickname: Pallas
- Colours: Blue and Gold
- Grounds: Garranebeg, Pallasgreen

Playing kits
Standard colours

Pallasgreen GAA club is a Gaelic Athletic Association club in Pallasgreen/Templebraden parish in east County Limerick, Ireland. The club was founded in 1887 and is a dual club fielding teams in both hurling and Gaelic football.

== Location ==
The club is situated in the parish of Pallasgreen/Templebraden and is a member of the East Board of Limerick GAA. The club is centred on the villages of Pallasgreen, Old Pallas, Nicker and Barna. The parish is roughly 22 km southeast of Limerick City and just 8 km from the border with County Tipperary. Neighbouring clubs are Kilteely/Dromkeen, Caherline, Caherconlish, Cappamore, Doon, Oola and Knockane. Knockane is the other GAA club situated in the southern half of the parish around the townlands of Knockane, Garrydoolis, Templebraden, Ballyneety and Sarsfield's Rock. Knockane fields Junior B hurling and football teams and has no underage structure. All juveniles therefore play with Pallasgreen and anyone living in the Knockane area can still play with Pallasgreen under the parish rule.

== History ==
The club was founded in 1887 in an area where Gaelic games had been played since before the foundation of the GAA in 1884. A Pallasgreen team beat Abbeyfeale in a tournament final at Corcanree. They competed in tournaments at various locations in County Limerick and many from the parish played with Knockane which had already been founded in 1884. The club was formed as 'New Pallas Milesians'. During those early years, Pallas, Knockane and Oola were all strong and players often interchanged between clubs. In 1898, Pallas contested their only Limerick Senior Football Championship where they were defeated by the Commercials. However, in 1911 they beat South Liberties in the County Intermediate Football Championship final. The club almost solely played football up to 1914 when a junior hurling team was formed. That team won the County Junior Hurling Championship the following year, beating Granagh in the final.

== Achievements ==
- Limerick Intermediate Hurling Championship (3) 1995, 2002, 2014
- Limerick Junior Hurling Championship (4) 1915, 1958, 1968, 1988
- Limerick Intermediate Football Championship (2) 2005, 2012
