= Father Casey's GAA =

Sports club in Abbeyfeale, County Limerick, Ireland

Fr. Casey's GAA Club
- CLG An tAthair Ó Cathasaigh
- Founded: 1884
- County: Limerick
- Colours: Blue and White
- Coordinates: 52°23′19.94″N 9°18′13.50″W

Playing kits
Standard colours

Senior Club Championships
	All Ireland	Munster champions	Limerick champions
Football:	-	-	8

Fr. Caseys GAA Club is an Irish Gaelic Athletic Association club based in Abbeyfeale on the border of counties Kerry and Limerick. Gaelic football is the club's main sport.

Established in 1884 by Father William Casey, Fr. Caseys GAA Club has been one of the most successful clubs in the history of Limerick Gaelic Games. Teams representing the club have won the Limerick Senior Football Championship on eight occasions and contributed many players to the Limerick county teams over the years. In addition to their Senior championship wins, Fr. Caseys have also had a number of Intermediate, Junior, U21, Minor and Underage successes.

Rugby internationals Phil Danaher and Séamus Dennison both played football for the club.

Father Casey's most recent Limerick senior title came in 2006, when the team defeated St. Senan's by two points in the final at the Gaelic Grounds.

== Fr. William Casey ==
The club is named after Fr. William Casey, a Catholic priest who was born in 1840 in the parish of Kilbehenny/Angelsborough, County Limerick. Ordained in 1868, he was appointed permanently as a curate to Abbeyfeale on 18 November 1871. He was later appointed parish priest of Abbeyfeale, a position he held until his death in 1907. As a follower of Michael Davitt, Fr. Casey became a leader in Abbeyfeale and its surrounding areas in the land league and the fight against landlordism. In addition to forming the GAA club, Fr. Casey was also responsible for organising the building of a local community hall and forming a brass and reed band. Between 1904 and 1906, he acted as chairman of the Limerick County Board.

== Grounds ==
The grounds of Fr. Caseys GAA club are situated on the Kerry side of the River Feale on the outskirts of Abbeyfeale.

== Achievements ==
- Limerick Senior Football Championship Winners (8) 1914, 1915, 1932, 1941, 1942, 1947, 2000, 2006
- Limerick Under-21 Football Championship Winners (3) 2009, 2010, 2011
