= Dromcollogher/Broadford GAA =

Gaelic games club in County Limerick, Ireland

- Drom Collachair–Béal an Átha
- County: Limerick
- Colours: Black, amber and red

Playing kits
Standard colours

Dromcollogher/Broadford GAA is a Gaelic Athletic Association (GAA) club located in the parish of Dromcollogher-Broadford in County Limerick, Ireland. It is a member of the West Division of Limerick GAA. The club has had some successes in the Limerick Senior Football Championship.Dromcollogher/Broadford was the first Limerick club to win the Munster club senior football championship.

== Honours ==
- Munster Senior Club Football Championship (1): 2008
- Limerick Senior Football Championship (7): 2001, 2003, 2004, 2008, 2009, 2012, 2013 (runners-up 2000, 2007, 2015, 2016)
- Limerick Junior Hurling Championships (4): 1959, 1963, 1993, 2015
- Limerick Junior B Football Championship (2): 1992, 2008
- Limerick Junior Football Championships (1): 1998
- Limerick Intermediate Football Championship(1): 1999

== External sources ==
- Limerick GAA site
