= Oola GAA =

Gaelic games club in County Limerick, Ireland

Oola
- Úbhla
- Founded: 1887
- County: Limerick
- Colours: Red and White
- Grounds: Kylenagoneeny, Oola
- Coordinates: 52°31′47.6″N 8°15′47.6″W

Playing kits
Standard colours

Senior Club Championships
	All Ireland	Munster champions	Limerick champions
Football:	-	-	6

Oola GAA is a Gaelic football club, founded in 1887. It is based in the village of Oola in County Limerick, Ireland. The club only plays football; hurlers in the parish play with neighbouring Doon.

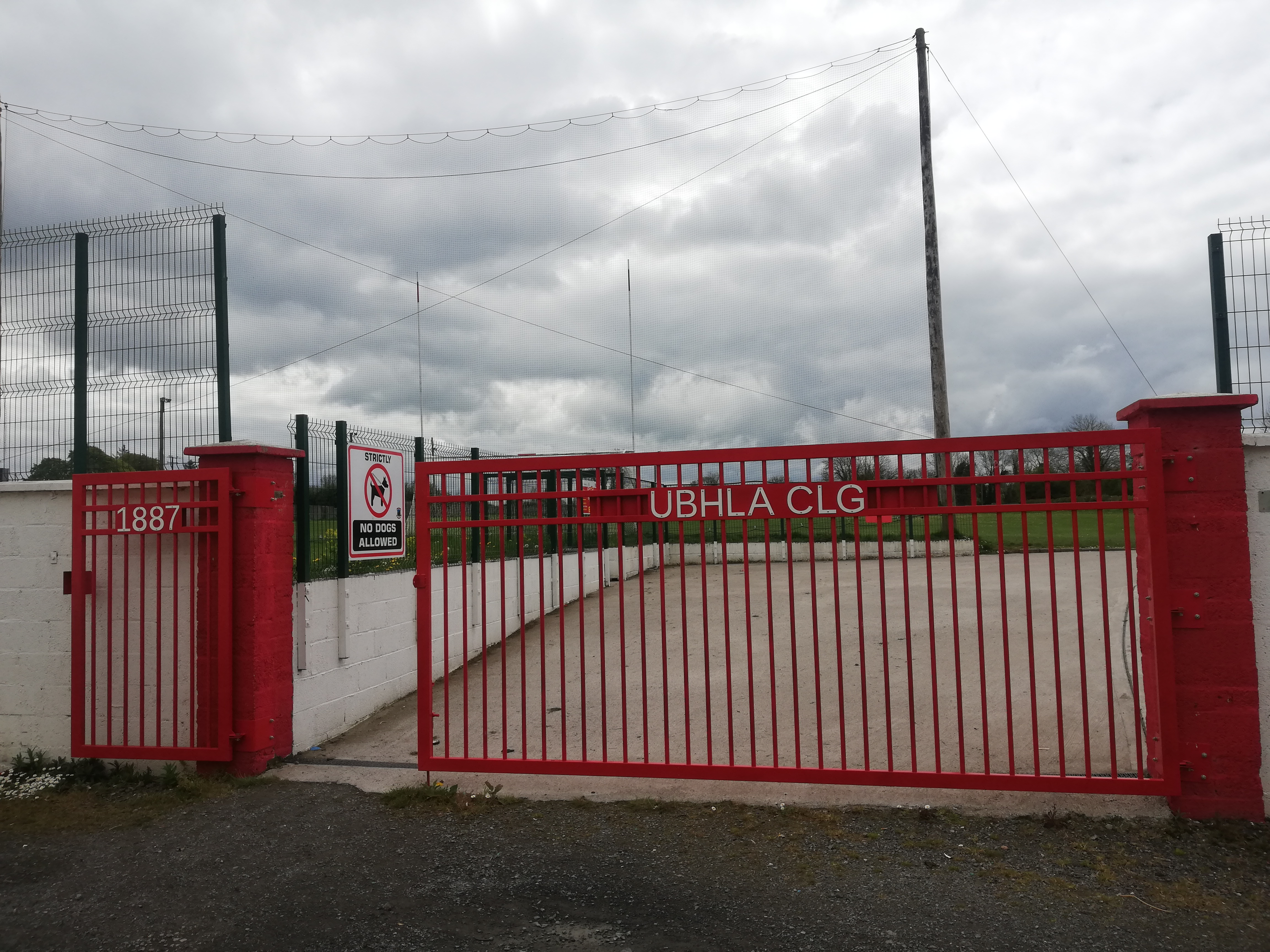
Oola GAA grounds

== Honours ==
- Limerick Senior Football Championship (6): 1900, 1918, 1922, 1925, 1961, 1979
- Limerick Intermediate Football Championship (1) 2015
- Limerick Junior Football Championship (1) 1969
- Limerick Minor Football Championship (4) 1967, 1968, 1969, 1996
- Limerick Under-21 Football Championship (3) 1967, 1968,, 1971
