= Jackie Carney =

Irish Gaelic footballer and trainer

Personal information
- Native name: Seánie Ó Cearnaigh (Irish)
- Born: 1906 Ballina, County Mayo, United Kingdom of Great Britain and Ireland
- Died: November 1984 (aged 78) Ballina, County Mayo, Ireland
- Occupations: Publican and shopkeeper

Sport
- Sport: Gaelic football
- Position: Right wing-forward
Club
- Years: Club
- Ballina Stephenites
Inter-county
Years	County	Apps (scores)
1931-1941	Mayo	17 (1-13)
Inter-county titles
- Connacht titles: 5
- All-Irelands: 1
- NFL: 7

John Carney (1906 – November 1984) was an Irish Gaelic footballer and trainer. His league and championship career at senior level with the Mayo county team spanned ten years from 1931 to 1941.

Carney made his debut on the inter-county scene when he was selected for the Mayo senior team during the 1930–31 league. After being dropped from the team the following year he was recalled in 1933 after winning an All-Ireland medal with the Mayo junior team. Over the course of the next eight seasons, Carney won one All-Ireland medals as left wing-forward on the team in 1936. He also won five Connacht medals and seven National Football League medals. He played his last game for Mayo in June 1941.

As a regular member of the Connacht inter-provincial team, Carney won a total of four Railway Cup medals.

Carney was appointed co-trainer of the Mayo senior team along with Gerald Courell in 1948. His tenure in charge saw the team win back-to-back All-Ireland titles in 1950 and 1951.

Carney's nephew, Martin, had a lengthy inter-county career with Donegal and Mayo.

== Career statistics ==
Team	Season	National League			Connacht		All-Ireland		Total	
Team	Season	Division	Apps	Score	Apps	Score	Apps	Score	Apps	Score
Mayo	1930-31	Division 1	1	0-00	0	0-00	1	0-00	2	0-00
Mayo	1931-32	Division 1	0	0-00	0	0-00	0	0-00	0	0-00
Mayo	1932-33	Division 1	0	0-00	0	0-00	0	0-00	0	0-00
Mayo	1933-34	Division 1	6	0-04	2	0-07	0	0-00	8	0-11
Mayo	1934-35	Division 1	8	2-03	2	0-00	1	0-00	11	2-03
Mayo	1935-36	Division 1	7	2-05	2	0-00	2	1-00	11	3-05
Mayo	1936-37	Division 1	8	4-04	1	0-02	1	0-02	10	4-08
Mayo	1937-38	Division 1	7	1-06	1	0-00	0	0-00	8	1-06
Mayo	1938-39	Division 1	7	3-01	2	0-00	2	0-01	11	3-02
Mayo	1939-40	Division 1	0	0-00	0	0-00	0	0-00	0	0-00
Mayo	1940-41	Division 1	2	0-02	1	0-01	0	0-00	3	0-03
Total			46	12-25	11	0-10	7	1-03	64	13-38

== Honours ==
Mayo

- All-Ireland Senior Football Championship (1): 1936 (c)
- Connacht Senior Football Championship (5): 1931, 1935, 1936 (c), 1937, 1939
- National Football League (7): 1933-34, 1934-35, 1935-36 (c), 1936-37, 1937-38, 1938-39, 1940-41
- All-Ireland Junior Football Championship (1): 1933
- Connacht Junior Football Championship (5): 1933

Connacht

- Railway Cup (4): 1934, 1936, 1937, 1938
