= Josie Munnelly =

Irish Gaelic footballer

Personal information
- Native name: Seosamh Ó Maonaile (Irish)
- Born: 1915 Crossmolina, County Mayo, Ireland
- Died: June 1996 (aged 81) Castlebar, County Mayo, Ireland
- Occupation: Psychiatric nurse

Sport
- Sport: Gaelic football
- Position: Right corner-forward
Club
- Years: Club
- 1932–1954: Castlebar Mitchels
Club titles
- Mayo titles: 13
Inter-county
- Years: County
- 1934–1948: Mayo
Inter-county titles
- Connacht titles: 4
- All-Irelands: 1
- NFL: 6

Josie Munnelly (March 1915 – June 1996) was an Irish Gaelic footballer. His league and championship career at senior level with the Mayo county team lasted fourteen seasons from 1934 until 1948.

Munnelly made his senior debut for Mayo during the 1934–35 league and quickly became a regular member of the starting fifteen. Over the course of the following fourteen seasons he enjoyed much success, the highlight being in 1936 when he won an All-Ireland medal. Munnelly also won four Connacht medals and six National Football League medals. After ending his senior career, Munnelly joined the Mayo junior team and won an All-Ireland medal in that grade in 1957.

== Honours ==
Castlebar Mitchels

- Mayo Senior Football Championship (13): 1932, 1934, 1941, 1942, 1944, 1945, 1946, 1948, 1950, 1951, 1952, 1953, 1954

Mayo

- All-Ireland Senior Football Championship (1): 1936
- Connacht Senior Football Championship (4): 1935, 1936, 1937, 1939
- National Football League (6): 1934–35, 1935–36, 1936–37, 1937–38, 1938–39, 1940–41
- All-Ireland Junior Football Championship (1): 1957
- Connacht Junior Football Championship (1): 1957

Connacht

- Railway Cup (2): 1937, 1938
