= George Ormsby (Gaelic footballer) =

Irish Gaelic footballer

Personal information
- Native name: Seoirse O'Armais (Irish)
- Born: 19 February 1913 Ballina, County Mayo, Ireland
- Died: 1 September 1965 (aged 52) Manorhamilton, County Leitrim, Ireland
- Occupation: Garda Síochána

Sport
- Sport: Gaelic football
- Position: Left wing-back
Club
- Years: Club
- Ballina Stephenites
Inter-county
- Years: County
- 1932-1941: Mayo
Inter-county titles
- Connacht titles: 5
- All-Irelands: 1
- NFL: 7

George Ormsby (19 February 1913 – 1 September 1965) was an Irish Gaelic footballer. His championship career at senior level with the Mayo county team lasted ten seasons from 1932 until 1941.

Ormsby made his senior debut for Mayo during the 1932 championship and quickly became a regular member of the starting fifteen. Over the course of the following decade he enjoyed much success, the highlight being in 1936 when he won an All-Ireland medal. Ormsby also won five Connacht medals and seven National Football League medals.

== Honours ==
Mayo

- All-Ireland Senior Football Championship (1): 1936
- Connacht Senior Football Championship (5): 1932, 1935, 1936, 1937, 1939
- National Football League (7): 1933-34, 1934-35, 1935-36, 1936-37, 1937-38, 1938-39, 1940-41

Connacht

- Railway Cup (2): 1934, 1936
