= 1936 All-Ireland Senior Football Championship final =

- Event: 1936 All-Ireland Senior Football Championship
Mayo	Laois
4–11 (23)	0–5 (5)
- Date: 27 September 1936
- Venue: Croke Park, Dublin
- Referee: Sean McCarthy (Kerry)
- Attendance: 50,168
- Weather: Sun

The 1936 All-Ireland Senior Football Championship final was the 49th All-Ireland Final and the deciding match of the 1936 All-Ireland Senior Football Championship, an inter-county Gaelic football tournament for the top teams in Ireland.

== Match ==
=== Summary ===
Séamus O'Malley, a native of Lavalley, Ballinrobe, was captain of the victorious team.

Henry Kenny, father of the future Taoiseach Enda Kenny, was on the winning Mayo team.

Paddy Munnelly scored a hat-trick as Mayo coasted to an easy victory. Laois's Bill Delaney played with two broken bones in his foot.

This was Mayo's first All-Ireland SFC title. Two more would follow by mid-century, with a fourth title occurring nearly a century later.

=== Details ===
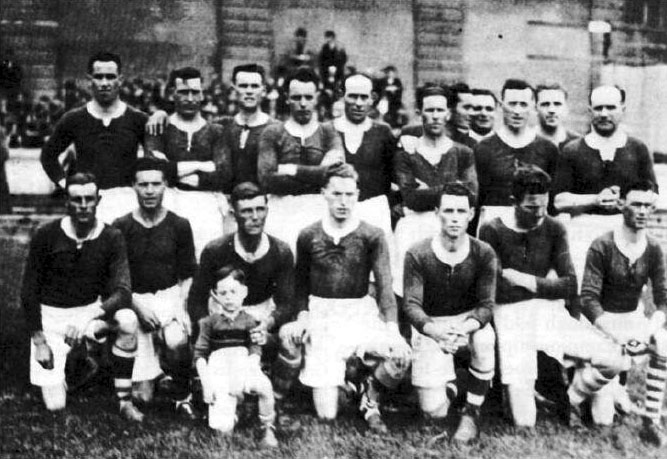
Laois team, runners-up

Final

Mayo	4–11 – 0–5	Laois
Gls: Jackie Carney (1), Josie Munnelly (2) & Paddy Munnelly (1). Pts: Patsy Flannelly (2), Tommy Grier (1), Josie Munnelly (3) & Paddy Moclair (5).		Pts: B.Delaney (2), T. Keogh, D. Douglas & J. O'Reilly (1) each.

Croke Park, Dublin
Referee: Sean McCarthy (Kerry)
Attendance: 50,168

Mayo	Laois

==== Mayo ====
- 1 Tom Burke
- 2 Jim McGowan
- 3 Paddy Quinn
- 4 Patrick Kelly
- 5 Timmy Regan
- 6 Séamus O'Malley (c)
- 7 George Ormsby
- 8 Patsy Flannelly
- 9 Henry Kenny
- 10 Jackie Carney
- 11 Peter Laffey
- 12 Tommy Grier
- 13 Josie Munnelly
- 14 Paddy Moclair
- 15 Paddy Munnelly

Subs not used
16 Patrick Collins
17 M. Joyce
18 Paddy Brett
19 Tommy McNicholas
20 Gerald Courell
21 M. O'Malley
22 R. Winters
23 Billy Mongey
