= George Ormsby =

George Ormsby may refer to:

- George Ormsby (bishop) (1843–1924), Anglican bishop
- George Ormsby (Gaelic footballer) (1913–1965), Irish Gaelic footballer
- George Ormsby (politician) (1916–2013), American plumber and political candidate from Pennsylvania
- George Ormsby (surveyor), Australian surveyor

== See also ==
- George Ormsby-Gore, 3rd Baron Harlech (1855–1938), British soldier and politician
