= 1979–80 National Football League (Ireland) =

Gaelic football competition

League details
- Dates: October 1979 – 27 April 1980

League champions
- Winners: Cork (3rd win)
- Captain: Christy Ryan
- Manager: Billy Morgan

League runners-up
- Runners-up: Kerry
- Captain: Jimmy Deenihan
- Manager: Mick O'Dwyer

The 1979–80 National Football League was the 49th staging of the National Football League (NFL), an annual Gaelic football tournament for the Gaelic Athletic Association county teams of Ireland.

Cork defeated Kerry in an all-Munster final.

== Format ==
=== Divisions ===
- Division One: 12 teams. Split into two regional groups of 6 (North and South)
- Division Two: 20 teams. Split into two 10 team regional sub-divisions of North and South, which were divided into five teams each.

=== Titles ===
Teams in both divisions competed for the National Football League title.

There was also a separate National Football League Division Two title.

=== Knockout stage qualifiers ===
- Division One (North): top 3 teams
- Division One (South): top 3 teams
- Division Two (North): winners
- Division Two (South): winners

=== Promotion and relegation ===
This was the last season of the present league format. For the 1980–81 season, the 32 counties were divided into four divisions of eight teams. The teams were not placed into the new structure entirely in line with their placings in the 1979–80 league.

== Group stage ==
=== Division One (North) ===
==== Division One (North) Play-offs ====
10 February 1980 For 1st Place	Armagh	0-10 — 1-4	Down	Coalisland

==== Table ====
Team	Pld	W	D	L	Pts	Notes
Armagh	5	4	0	1	8	Qualified for Knockout Stages
Down	5	4	0	1	8	Qualified for Knockout Stages
Roscommon	5	3	0	2	6	Qualified for Knockout Stages
Mayo	5	2	0	3	4	Relegated to Division Two of the 1980–81 NFL
Tyrone	5	2	0	3	4	Relegated to Division Two of the 1980–81 NFL
Cavan	5	0	0	5	0	Relegated to Division Three of the 1980–81 NFL

=== Division One (South) ===
==== Table ====
Team	Pld	W	D	L	Pts	Notes
Galway	5	4	1	0	9	Qualified for Knockout Stages and relegated to Division Two of the 1980–81 NFL
Kerry	5	3	1	1	7	Qualified for Knockout Stages
Cork	5	2	1	2	5	Qualified for Knockout Stages
Kildare	5	2	0	3	4
Dublin	5	1	1	3	3
Offaly	5	1	0	4	2

=== Division Two (North) ===
==== Division Two (North) Final ====
24 February 1980 Final	Fermanagh	2-6 — 1-4	Antrim	Coalisland

==== Group A table ====
Team	Pld	W	D	L	Pts	Notes
Antrim	8	5	2	1	12
Derry	8	5	1	2	11
Monaghan	8	4	1	3	9
Louth	8	3	1	4	7	Relegated to Division Three of the 1980–81 NFL
Westmeath	8	0	1	7	1	Relegated to Division Four of the 1980–81 NFL

==== Group B table ====
Team	Pld	W	D	L	Pts	Notes
Fermanagh	8	6	1	1	13	Qualified for Knockout Phase and relegated to Division Three of the 1980–81 NFL
Longford	8	5	0	3	10	Relegated to Division Four of the 1980–81 NFL
Donegal	8	3	3	2	9	Relegated to Division Three of the 1980–81 NFL
Leitrim	8	2	1	5	3	Relegated to Division Four of the 1980–81 NFL
Sligo	8	1	1	6	3	Relegated to Division Three of the 1980–81 NFL

=== Division Two (South) ===
==== Division Two (South) Final ====
2 March 1980 Final	Wexford	1-14 — 0-7	Clare	Croke Park, Dublin

==== Group A table ====
Team	Pld	W	D	L	Pts	Notes
Clare	8	5	2	1	12	Relegated to Division Three of the 1980–81 NFL
Laois	8	5	1	2	11
Meath	8	5	0	3	10
Tipperary	8	3	1	4	7	Relegated to Division Three of the 1980–81 NFL
Limerick	8	0	0	8	0	Relegated to Division Four of the 1980–81 NFL

==== Group B table ====
Team	Pld	W	D	L	Pts	Notes
Wexford	8	8	0	0	16	Qualified for Knockout stage and relegated to Division Three of the 1980–81 NFL
Carlow	8	4	0	4	8	Relegated to Division Four of the 1980–81 NFL
Wicklow	8	4	0	4	8	Relegated to Division Four of the 1980–81 NFL
Waterford	8	3	0	5	6	Relegated to Division Four of the 1980–81 NFL
Kilkenny	8	1	0	7	2	Relegated to Division Four of the 1980–81 NFL

== Knockout stage ==
=== Quarter-finals ===
23 March 1980

Armagh	1-8 – 2-5	Wexford

Croke Park, Dublin

30 March 1980
Replay

Armagh	0-13 – 0-5	Wexford

Croke Park, Dublin

23 March 1980

Galway	1-12 – 0-10	Fermanagh

Carrick-on-Shannon

23 March 1980

Kerry	1-8 – 1-5	Roscommon

Gaelic Grounds, Limerick

23 March 1980

Cork	3-6 – 0-6	Down

Croke Park, Dublin

=== Semi-final ===
6 April 1980

Kerry	1-11 – 1-6	Armagh

Croke Park, Dublin

13 April 1980

Cork	1-16 – 1-6	Galway

Croke Park, Dublin
Attendance: 11,410

=== Final ===
27 April 1980
3:30 p.m.

Cork	0-11 – 0-10	Kerry

Páirc Uí Chaoimh, Cork
Attendance: 39,139
Referee: Tommy Moran (Leitrim)

== Division Two Final ==
6 July 1980 'Home' Final	Wexford	5-14 — 0-10	Fermanagh	Croke Park, Dublin

30 August 1980 Final	Wexford	7-17 — 1-7	Warwickshire	Coventry

== See also ==
- Cork–Kerry Gaelic football rivalry
