= Owen Lennon (Gaelic footballer) =

Monaghan Gaelic footballer

Sport
- Sport: Gaelic Football
- Position: Midfielder
Club
- Years: Club
- Latton O'Rahilly
Inter-county
Years	County	Apps (scores)
2002-2016	Monaghan	129
Inter-county titles
- Ulster titles: 2

Owen Lennon is a Gaelic football manager and former player who played with Monaghan between 2002 and 2016.

== Playing career ==
Latton clubman Lennon made his debut for Monaghan in the 2002 National league against Carlow, providing a man of the match performance. He made his championship debut in the same year against Fermanagh.

Despite problems with chronic back pain, Lennon was ever-present for Monaghan between 2002 and 2014, missing only one championship game in that time.

He captained Monaghan to their 2013 Ulster Championship title. and was a member of the Monaghan team which won the 2015 Ulster Championship.

He was named in the Irish News All-Stars team for 2007.
