= Gerald Courell =

Irish Gaelic footballer (1906-1983)

Personal information
- Native name: Gearóid Mac Fhearchail (Irish)
- Born: 28 July 1906 Ballina, County Mayo, Ireland
- Died: 12 September 1983 (aged 77) Ballina, County Mayo, Ireland
- Occupation: Draper
- Height: 5 ft 8 in (173 cm)

Sport
- Sport: Gaelic football
- Position: Right corner-forward
Club
- Years: Club
- 1924-1943: Ballina Stephenites
Club titles
- Mayo titles: 8
Inter-county
- Years: County
- 1927-1937: Mayo
Inter-county titles
- Connacht titles: 6
- All-Irelands: 1
- NFL: 4

Gerald Thomas Courell (28 July 1906 – 12 September 1983) was an Irish Gaelic football player, trainer and referee. At club level, he played with Ballina Stephenites and had All-Ireland SFC successes with the Mayo senior football team as both a player and a trainer.

== Honours ==
=== Player ===
Mayo

- All-Ireland Senior Football Championship: 1936
- Connacht Senior Football Championship: 1929, 1930, 1931, 1932, 1935, 1936
- National Football League: 1933–34 (c), 1934–35, 1935–36, 1936–37

=== Trainer ===
Mayo

- All-Ireland Senior Football Championship: 1950, 1951
- Connacht Senior Football Championship: 1948, 1949, 1950, 1951
- National Football League: 1948–49
