= 1931–32 National Football League (Ireland) =

Gaelic football competition

League details
- Dates: October 1931 – 1932

League champions
- Winners: Kerry (4th win)
- Captain: Johnny Riordan

League runners-up
- Runners-up: Cork
- Captain: Jim O'Regan

The 1931–32 National Football League was the 5th staging of the National Football League, a Gaelic football tournament for the Gaelic Athletic Association county teams of Ireland.

Kerry won their fourth league in a row.

== Format ==
There were four divisions – Northern, Southern, Eastern and Western. Division winners played off for the NFL title.

== Division One ==
=== Group A ===
8 March 1931 Round 1	Dublin	2-4 — 2-10	Kildare	Croke Park, Dublin

8 March 1931 Round 1	Laois	1-2 — 2-4	Kerry	Portlaoise

12 April 1931 Round 2	Kildare	0-5 — 0-10	Laois	Athy

26 April 1931 Round 2	Kerry	2-9 — 1-2	Kildare	Austin Stack Park, Tralee

24 May 1931 Round 3	Dublin	0-6 — 2-2	Laois	Croke Park, Dublin

15 November 1931 Round 3	Kerry	1-10 — 3-2	Dublin	Listowel

==== Table ====
Team	Pld	W	D	L	Pts	Status
Kerry	3	3	0	0	6	Advance to Knockout stage
Laois	3	2	0	1	4
Kildare	3	1	0	2	2
Dublin	3	0	0	3	0

=== Group B (Munster Football League) ===
Cork, Waterford, Tipperary, Clare, Limerick

31 May 1931 Round 1	Clare	3-3 — 1-5	Limerick	Shanagolden

31 May 1931 Round 1	Cork	2-2 — 3-5	Tipperary	Cork Athletic Grounds

14 July 1931 Round 2	Waterford	0-9 — 2-1	Limerick	Dungarvan

15 November 1931 Round 1	Clare	1-8 — 2-4	Waterford	Kilrush

7 February 1932 Round 1	Limerick	1-3 — 3-1	Cork	Newcastle West

7 February 1932 Round 1	Waterford	2-5 — 2-3	Tipperary	Walsh Park, Waterford

28 February 1932 Round 5	Cork	2-4 — 1-6	Clare	Ennis

6 March 1932 Round 5	Limerick	3-6 — 0-3	Tipperary	Glin

2 October 1932 Play-off for 1st place	Cork	5-4 — 0-1	Clare	Cork

=== Group C ===
8 March 1931 Round 1	Louth	0-5 — 0-5	Down	Dundalk

12 April 1931 Round 1	Antrim	1-7 — 1-1	Louth	Corrigan Park, Belfast

19 April 1931 Round 2	Down	1-3 — 1-5	Armagh	Newry

26 April 1931 Round 2	Armagh	2-5 — 0-3	Antrim	Camlough, Newry

26 April 1931 Round 2	Meath	6-2 — 0-0	Down	Navan

26 April 1931 Round 2	Louth	2-7 — 2-3	Cavan	Drogheda

25 October 1931 Round 1	Louth	1-6 — 1-6	Armagh	Dundalk

8 November 1931 Round 6	Meath	0-7 — 1-3	Cavan	Navan

15 November 1931 Round 6	Cavan	5-6 — 0-2	Armagh	Breffni Park, Cavan

22 November 1931 Round 6	Meath	0-6 — 2-0	Louth	Navan

29 November 1931 Round 6	Cavan	7-5 — 3-0	Down	Breffni Park, Cavan

6 December 1931 Round 6	Antrim	5-0 — 2-1	Cavan	Belfast

10 January 1932 Round 6	Down	2-3 — 0-2	Antrim	Downpatrick

24 January 1932 Round 6	Antrim	0-2 — 2-6	Meath	Corrigan Park, Belfast

7 February 1932 Round 1	Armagh	1-6 — 0-5	Meath	Crossmaglen

24 April 1932 1st Place Play-off	Meath	2-6 — 1-7	Armagh	Drogheda

==== Table ====
Team	Pld	W	D	L	Pts	Status
Meath	5	3	1	1	7	Advance to Knockout stage
Armagh	5	3	1	1	7
Louth	5	1	3	1	4
Cavan	5	2	0	3	4
Antrim	5	2	0	3	4
Down	5	1	1	3	3

=== Group D ===
19 April 1931 Round 1	Mayo	5-10 — 0-2	Sligo	McHale Park, Castlebar

3 May 1931 Round 1	Galway	1-6 — 0-2	Roscommon	Tuam

28 June 1931 Round 2	Roscommon	2-4 — 3-4	Mayo	Castlerea

26 July 1931 Round 3	Sligo	2-5 — 1-3	Roscommon	Tubbercurry, Sligo

4 October 1931 Round 3	Mayo	1-5 — 0-7	Galway	Ballinrobe

==== Table ====
Team	Pld	W	D	L	Pts	Status
Mayo	3	3	0	0	6	Advance to Knockout stage
Galway	3	2	0	1	4
Sligo	3	1	0	2	2
Roscommon	3	0	0	3	0

=== Semi-finals ===
6 March 1932

Kerry	2-5 – 1-6	Mayo

Killarney

Cork	w/o – scr	Meath

Cork

=== Final ===
5 February 1933

Kerry	5-2 – 3-3	Cork

Killarney
Attendance: 2,500

== Division two ==
=== Midland Section ===
==== Southern ====
Kilkenny scratched v Carlow

8 March 1931 Round 1	Wicklow	2-2 — 3-1	Carlow	Wicklow

==== Northern ====
8 March 1931 Round 1	Westmeath	6-3 — 1-1	Offaly	Mullingar

26 April 1931 Round 2	Offaly	0-7 — 2-5	Longford	Tullamore

15 November 1931 Round 3	Longford	4-2 — 9-9	Westmeath	Longford

==== Final ====
6 March 1932	Westmeath	1-6 — 1-5	Carlow	Carlow

=== Northern Section ===
8 March 1931 Round 1	Derry	1-4 — 1-3	Fermanagh	Brandywell, Derry

8 March 1931 Round 1	Tyrone	2-2 — 1-2	Donegal	Dungannon

12 April 1931 Round 2	Fermanagh	3-2 — 1-3	Tyrone	Enniskillen

12 April 1931 Round 2	Donegal	4-7 — 0-2	Derry	Ballybofey

26 April 1931 Round 3	Donegal	0-3 — 0-7	Fermanagh	Ballybofey

26 April 1931 Round 3	Derry	1-3 — 3-4	Tyrone	Brandywell, Derry

19 July 1931 1st Place Play-off	Tyrone	2-5 — 2-4	Fermanagh	Dungannon

==== Table ====
Team	Pld	W	D	L	Pts	Status
Tyrone	3	2	0	1	4	Win Division Two (Northern)
Fermanagh	3	2	0	1	4
Donegal	3	1	0	2	2
Derry	3	1	0	2	2
