= 1963–64 National Football League (Ireland) =

Gaelic football competition

League details
- Dates: October 1963 – 18 October 1964

League champions
- Winners: New York (2nd win)
- Captain: Tom Hennessy

League runners-up
- Runners-up: Dublin
- Captain: Mickey Whelan

The 1963–64 National Football League was the 33rd staging of the National Football League (NFL), an annual Gaelic football tournament for the Gaelic Athletic Association county teams of Ireland.

New York again got a bye to the final. Dublin met them after a win over Down in the Home Final, and travelled to The Bronx for the final, also billed as the "World Championship". A Brendan O'Donnell goal after half-time allowed NY to build up a seven-point lead, which a Dublin rally reduced to one point. Late in the game, players brawled on the field and were joined by a spectator, who received a black eye. New York captain Tom Hennessy scored a late point to seal victory.

== Format ==
=== Divisions ===
- Division I: 8 team. Split into two groups (one of five, one of four)
- Division II: 7 teams
- Division III: 7 teams.
- Division III: 9 teams. Split into two groups (one of five, one of four)

=== Round-robin format ===
Each team played every other team in its division (or group where the division is split) once, either home or away.

=== Points awarded ===
2 points were awarded for a win and 1 for a draw.

=== Titles ===
Teams in all three divisions competed for the National Football League title.

Division I also doubled as the Dr Lagan Cup

=== Knockout stage qualifiers ===
- Division I: winners
- Division II: winners
- Division III: winners
- Division IV: winners

=== Knockout phase structure ===
4 Division winners play Semi-finals

=== Promotion and relegation ===
None

=== Separation of teams on equal points ===
In the event that teams finish on equal points, then a play-off will be used to determine group placings if necessary, i.e. where to decide semi-finalists.

== Group stage ==
=== Division I (Dr Lagan Cup) ===
==== Inter-group play-offs ====
1 March 1964 Semi-final	Down	3-14 — 0-8	Derry	Casement Park, Belfast

8 March 1964 Semi-final	Antrim	3-7 — 1-7	Fermanagh	Clones

15 March 1964 Final	Down	0-12 — 1-7	Antrim	Dungannon

==== Group A ====
Team	Pld	W	D	L	Pts	Status
Fermanagh	3	3	0	0	6
Derry	3	2	0	1	4
Armagh	3	0	1	2	1
Donegal	3	0	1	2	1

==== Group B ====
Team	Pld	W	D	L	Pts	Status
Down	3	3	0	0	6	Win Dr Lagan Cup; advance to Knockout Stage
Antrim	3	2	0	1	4
Tyrone	3	1	0	2	2
Monaghan	3	0	0	3	0

=== Division II ===
Team	Pld	W	D	L	Pts	Status
Cavan	6	5	0	1	10	Qualified for knockout stage
Meath	6	4	0	2	8
Mayo	6	4	0	2	8
Sligo	6	3	0	3	6
Longford	6	3	0	3	6
Leitrim	6	1	0	5	2
Westmeath	6	1	0	5	2

=== Division III ===
Team	Pld	W	D	L	Pts	Status
Dublin	6	5	0	1	10	Qualified for knockout stage
Galway	6	4	1	1	9
Roscommon	6	3	0	3	6
Offaly	6	3	0	3	6
Wicklow	6	2	1	3	5
Louth	6	2	1	3	5
Laois	6	0	1	5	1

=== Division IV ===
==== Inter-group play-offs ====
8 March 1964 Final	Kerry	1-21 — 2-6	Waterford	Clonmel

==== Group A ====
Team	Pld	W	D	L	Pts	Status
Kerry	4	4	0	0	8	Advance to Knockout stage
Kildare	4	2	1	1	5
Cork	4	2	0	2	4
Wexford	4	1	0	3	2
Carlow	4	0	1	3	1

==== Group B ====
Team	Pld	W	D	L	Pts	Status
Waterford	3	3	0	0	6
Tipperary	3	1	1	1	3
Limerick	3	1	1	1	3
Clare	3	0	1	2	1

== Knockout stages ==
=== Semi-finals ===
5 April 1964

Down	1-8 – 0-7	Cavan

Croke Park, Dublin

12 April 1964

Dublin	0-10 – 0-9	Kerry

Croke Park, Dublin

=== Finals ===
1964
Home Final

Dublin	2-9 – 0-7	Down

Croke Park, Dublin
Attendance: 70,125
Referee: John Dowling (Offaly)

18 October 1964
Final

New York	2-12 – 1-13	Dublin
J Foley 1-3; B. O’Donnell 1-1; J. Foley, P. Casey 0-3 each; P. Cummins, T. Hennessey 0-2 each; E. McGuinness 0-1	Report	Mickey Whelan 1-3; B McDonald 0-5; Ferguson, Davey, Fox, Timmons, Casey 0-1 each

Gaelic Park, New York City
Attendance: 12,000
Referee: Patsy Geraghty (Galway)
