= 1980–81 National Football League (Ireland) =

Gaelic football competition

League details
- Dates: October 1980 – 10 May 1981

League champions
- Winners: Galway (3rd win)
- Captain: Barry Brennan

League runners-up
- Runners-up: Roscommon
- Captain: Danny Murray

The 1980–81 National Football League was the 50th staging of the National Football League (NFL), an annual Gaelic football tournament for the Gaelic Athletic Association county teams of Ireland.

Galway defeated Roscommon in an all-Connacht final.

== Format ==
=== Titles ===
Teams in all four divisions competed for one league title.

=== Divisions ===
- Division One: 8 teams
- Division Two: 8 teams
- Division Three: 8 teams
- Division Four: 8 teams

=== Round-robin format ===
Each team played every other team in its division once, either home or away.

=== Points awarded ===
2 points were awarded for a win and 1 for a draw.

=== Knockout stage qualifiers ===
- Division One: top 4 teams
- Division Two: top 2 teams
- Division Three: top team
- Division Four: top team

=== Knockout phase structure ===
In the Preliminary quarter-finals, the match-ups were as follows

- Preliminary Quarter-final 1: Fourth-placed team in Division One v First-placed team in Division Four
- Preliminary Quarter-final 2: Second-placed team in Division Two v First-placed team in Division Three

In the quarter-finals, the match-ups were as follows

- Quarter-final 1: Winner Preliminary Quarter-final 1 v First-placed team in Division Two
- Quarter-final 2: Winner Preliminary Quarter-final 2 v Third-placed team in Division One

The semi-final match-ups are:

- Semi-final 1: First-placed team in Division One v Winner Quarter-final 1
- Semi-final 2: Second-placed team in Division One v Winner Quarter-final 2

=== Separation of teams on equal points ===
In the event that teams finish on equal points, then a play-off will be used to determine group placings if necessary, i.e. where to decide relegation places or quarter-finalists.

== League stage ==
=== Division One ===
==== Regulation Games ====
| 5 October 1980 Round 1 | Cork | 0-10 — 0-13 | Kerry | Páirc Uí Chaoimh, Cork |

| 5 October 1980 Round 1 | Roscommon | 3-14 — 0-8 | Kildare | Dr. Hyde Park, Roscommon |

| 5 October 1980 Round 1 | Armagh | 3-10 — 0-9 | Offaly | Athletic Grounds, Armagh |

==== Division One play-offs ====
| 15 March 1981 For 3rd Place | Dublin | 1-7 — 1-5 | Armagh | Croke Park, Dublin |

==== Tables ====
| Team | Pld | W | D | L | Pts | Notes |
|---|---|---|---|---|---|---|
| Kerry | 7 | 5 | 1 | 1 | 11 | Qualified for Knockout Stages |
| Roscommon | 7 | 4 | 2 | 1 | 10 | Qualified for Knockout Stages |
| Dublin | 7 | 4 | 1 | 2 | 9 | Qualified for Knockout Stages |
| Armagh | 7 | 4 | 1 | 2 | 9 | Qualified for Knockout Stages |
| Cork | 7 | 3 | 2 | 2 | 8 |
| Offaly | 7 | 2 | 2 | 3 | 6 |
| Down | 7 | 1 | 1 | 5 | 3 | Relegated to Division Two of the 1981–82 NFL |
| Kildare | 7 | 0 | 0 | 7 | 0 | Relegated to Division Two of the 1981–82 NFL |

=== Division Two ===
==== Division Two Regulation Games ====
| 5 October 1980 Round 1 | Derry | 2-12 — 2-3 | Laois | Ballinascreen |

==== Tables ====
| Team | Pld | W | D | L | Pts | Notes |
|---|---|---|---|---|---|---|
| Galway | 7 | 5 | 2 | 0 | 12 | Promoted to Division One of the 1981–82 NFL and qualified for Knockout Stages |
| Mayo | 7 | 3 | 4 | 0 | 10 | Promoted to Division One of the 1981–82 NFL and qualified for Knockout Stages |
| Tyrone | 7 | 3 | 2 | 2 | 8 |
| Derry | 7 | 3 | 1 | 3 | 7 |
| Meath | 7 | 3 | 1 | 3 | 7 |
| Monaghan | 7 | 2 | 1 | 4 | 5 |
| Laois | 7 | 2 | 0 | 5 | 4 | Relegated to Division Three of the 1981–82 NFL |
| Antrim | 7 | 1 | 1 | 5 | 3 | Relegated to Division Three of the 1981–82 NFL |

=== Division Three ===
| Team | Pld | W | D | L | Pts | Notes |
|---|---|---|---|---|---|---|
| Fermanagh | 7 | 6 | 1 | 0 | 13 | Promoted to Division Two of the 1981–82 NFL and Qualified for Knockout Stages |
| Cavan | 7 | 5 | 0 | 2 | 10 | Promoted to Division Two of the 1981–82 NFL |
| Donegal | 7 | 3 | 2 | 2 | 8 |
| Louth | 7 | 3 | 1 | 3 | 7 |
| Wexford | 7 | 3 | 0 | 4 | 6 |
| Tipperary | 7 | 3 | 0 | 4 | 6 |
| Sligo | 7 | 2 | 0 | 5 | 4 | Relegated to Division Four of the 1981–82 NFL |
| Clare | 7 | 1 | 0 | 6 | 2 | Relegated to Division Four of the 1981–82 NFL |

=== Division Four ===
| Team | Pld | W | D | L | Pts | Notes |
|---|---|---|---|---|---|---|
| Wicklow | 7 | 7 | 0 | 0 | 14 | Promoted to Division Three of the 1981–82 NFL and Qualified for Knockout Stages |
| Westmeath | 7 | 6 | 0 | 1 | 12 | Promoted to Division Three of the 1981–82 NFL |
| Longford | 7 | 4 | 1 | 2 | 9 |
| Waterford | 7 | 3 | 1 | 3 | 7 |
| Leitrim | 7 | 2 | 1 | 4 | 5 |
| Limerick | 7 | 2 | 1 | 4 | 5 |
| Carlow | 7 | 2 | 0 | 5 | 4 |
| Kilkenny | 7 | 0 | 0 | 7 | 0 |

== Knockout stage ==
=== Preliminary quarter-finals ===
22 March 1981

| Armagh | 2-11 – 1-10 | Wicklow |

Croke Park, Dublin

22 March 1981

| Mayo | 2-9 – 0-9 | Fermanagh |

Páirc Seán Mac Diarmada, Carrick-on-Shannon

=== Quarter-finals ===
5 April 1981

| Mayo | 1-11 – 1-10 | Dublin |

Dr. Hyde Park, Roscommon

5 April 1981

| Galway | 1-11 – 2-3 | Armagh |

Croke Park, Dublin

=== Semi-finals ===
26 April 1981

| Galway | 0-10 – 0-8 | Kerry |

Cusack Park, Ennis

26 April 1981

| Roscommon | 1-11 – 1-6 | Mayo |

Dr. Hyde Park, Roscommon

=== Final ===
10 May 1981

| Galway | 1-11 – 1-3 | Roscommon |

Croke Park, Dublin
Attendance: 22,876
Referee: Paddy Collins (Westmeath)
