= 1927–28 National Football League (Ireland) =

Gaelic football competition

League details
- Dates: 24 April 1927 – 1928

League champions
- Winners: Kerry (1st win)
- Captain: Joe Barrett

League runners-up
- Runners-up: Kildare
- Captain: Bill "Squires" Gannon

The 1927–28 National Football League was the 2nd staging of the National Football League, a Gaelic football tournament for the Gaelic Athletic Association county teams of Ireland, held in 1927 and 1928.

The League was won by Kerry.

== Format ==
There were three divisions – Northern, Southern, and Western. Division winners played off for the NFL title.

The league was not decided by a one-match final. The three division winners played each other in a series of Inter-Divisional tests. As Kerry and Kildare both defeated Mayo, it meant that the Kerry v Kildare tie was a 'de facto' final.

== Results ==
=== Northern Division ===
3 April 1927 Round	Kildare	3-8 — 1-2	Down

3 April 1927 Round	Armagh	0-2 — 0-2	Tyrone

18 September 1927 Round	Armagh	2-9 — 0-12	Cavan	Athletic Grounds, Armagh,

30 October 1927 Round	Down	2-7 — 2-6	Dublin	Newry,

13 November 1927 Round 2	Louth	4-4 — 0-2	Dublin	Drogheda,

27 November 1927 Round 2	Louth	2-6 — 1-4	Meath	Navan,

27 November 1927 Round 2	Monaghan	4-4 — 4-4	Kildare	Carrickmacross,

27 November 1927 Round	Dublin	3-5 — 0-8	Armagh	Croke Park, Dublin,

11 December 1927 Round	Louth	7-4 — 2-0	Down	Dundalk,

8 January 1928 Round	Armagh	3-3 — 2-3	Meath	Athletic Grounds, Armagh,

==== Table ====
Team	Pld	W	D	L	Pts	Status
Kildare	8	7	1	0	15	Advance to Knockout stage
Louth	8	6	0	2	12
Armagh	7	4	1	2	9
Down	7	3	0	4	8
Cavan	7	3	1	3	7
Meath	7	3	0	4	4
Monaghan	6	1	1	4	3
Dublin	6	1	1	4	3
Tyrone	6	0	1	5	1

Meath beat Down, but forfeited the points for being late on the field

=== Southern Division ===
27 February 1927 Round 1	Clare	L — W	Laois	Kilkee

27 February 1927 Round 1	Kerry	2-6 — 0-4	Cork	Tralee,

27 February 1927 Round 1	Tipperary	0-3 — 2-4	Kilkenny	Carrick-on-Suir,

20 March 1927 Round 2	Wexford	0-4 — 0-4	Kilkenny	Barrett Park, New Ross,

20 March 1927 Round 2	Laois	0-1 — 1-6	Kerry	Portlaoise,

3 April 1927 Round 3	Wexford	3-4 — 0-0	Cork	Wexford Park, Wexford

3 April 1927 Round 3	Kerry	4-0 — 1-5	Clare	Austin Stack Park, Tralee

24 April 1927 Round 4	Cork	2-3 — 0-1	Kilkenny	Cork Athletic Grounds,

9 October 1927	Wexford	4-2 — 1-4	Clare	Enniscorthy,

9 October 1927	Kerry	w/o — scr,	Tipperary

27 November 1927	Kerry	w/o — scr,	Kilkenny

5 February 1928 Round 6	Kerry	2-3 — 0-2	Wexford	Austin Stack Park, Tralee,

12 February 1928 Round	Wexford	1-7 — 1-1	Tipperary	Barrett Park, New Ross,

==== Table ====
Team	Pld	W	D	L	Pts	Status
Kerry	6	6	0	0	12	Advance to Knockout stage
Laois	6	5	0	1	10
Wexford	6	3	1	2	7
Cork	5	2	0	3	4
Kilkenny	6	1	2	3	4
Clare	6	1	1	4	3
Tipperary	5	0	0	5	0

Laois were awarded the points in respect of their tie with Clare at Kilkee

=== Western Division ===
Mayo won, finishing ahead of Sligo, Galway, Roscommon and Leitrim.

24 April 1927 Round 1	Mayo	2-7 — 1-5	Sligo	Claremorris,

8 May 1927 Round 2	Mayo	2-5 — 1-6	Roscommon	Claremorris,

18 September 1927 Round 2	Mayo	0-9 — 0-8	Leitrim	Roscommon,

=== Inter-divisional tests ===
25 March 1928

Kildare	0-8 – 0-5	Mayo

Croke Park, Dublin

15 April 1928

Kerry	0-6 – 1-1	Mayo

Castlebar

29 April 1928
de facto Final

Kerry	2-4 – 1-6	Kildare

Croke Park, Dublin
Attendance: 12,000
Referee: Tom Shevlin, Roscommon

==== Table ====
Team	Pld	W	D	L	Pts	Status
Kerry	2	2	0	0	4	NFL Winners
Kildare	2	1	0	1	2	NFL runners-up
Mayo	2	0	0	2	0
