= 2003 National Football League (Ireland) =

Gaelic football competition

League details
- Dates: February - 4 May 2003
- Teams: 32

League champions
- Winners: Tyrone (2nd win)
- Captain: Peter Canavan
- Manager: Mickey Harte

League runners-up
- Runners-up: Laois
- Captain: Ian Fitzgerald
- Manager: Mick O'Dwyer

Other division winners
- Division 2: Westmeath

The 2003 National Football League, known for sponsorship reasons as the Allianz National Football League, was the 72nd staging of the National Football League (NFL), an annual Gaelic football tournament for the Gaelic Athletic Association county teams of Ireland. Tyrone beat Laois in the final.

== Format ==
=== League structure ===
The top 16 teams were drawn into Divisions 1A and 1B. The other 16 teams were drawn into Divisions 2A and 2B. Each team played all the other teams in its section once: either home or away. Teams earned 2 points for a win and 1 for a draw.

=== Finals, promotions and relegations ===
The top two teams in Divisions 1A and 1B progressed to the Division 1 semi-finals while the bottom two teams in Divisions 1A and 1B were relegated. The top two teams in Divisions 2A and 2B progressed to the Division 2 semi-finals and were promoted to Division 1A and 1B, respectively.

=== Tie-breaker ===
If two or more teams are level on points, points difference was used to rank the teams.

== Division 1 ==
=== Division 1A Table ===
Compete in Division 1 semi-finals Automatic relegation to Division 2A

Team	Pld	W	D	L	F	A	Diff	Pts
Tyrone	7	5	0	2	5-87	0-82	20	10
Armagh	7	4	0	3	6-79	5-64	18	8
Cork	7	4	0	3	10-70	4-74	14	8
Kerry	7	4	0	3	7-79	8-68	8	8
Galway	7	3	1	3	5-83	6-76	4	7
Dublin	7	3	1	3	1-80	4-85	-14	7
Roscommon	7	3	0	4	4-70	5-81	-14	6
Donegal	7	1	0	6	4-61	10-79	-36	2

=== Division 1A Rounds 1 to 7 ===
01/02/03; Round 1	Cork	4-8 - 1-9	Kerry	Páirc Uí Rinn

02/02/03; Round 1	Roscommon	0-11 - 0-10	Tyrone	Roscommon

02/02/03; Round 1	Dublin	0-7 - 1-15	Armagh	Croke Park

02/02/03; Round 1	Galway	1-16 - 1-8	Donegal	Tuam
02/02/03; Round 1		Report		Tuam

09/02/03; Round 2	Donegal	0-9 - 1-10	Dublin	Ballyshannon

09/02/03; Round 2	Kerry	2-11 - 0-4	Roscommon	Tralee

09/02/03; Round 2	Armagh	0-9 - 1-3	Cork	Crossmaglen

09/02/03; Round 2	Tyrone	1-13 - 0-11	Galway	Pomeroy

16/02/03; Round 3	Roscommon	1-12 - 1-11	Cork	Roscommon

16/02/03; Round 3	Galway	1-13 - 0-9	Kerry	Galway

16/02/03; Round 3	Donegal	1-6 - 2-9	Armagh	Ballybofey

16/02/03; Round 3	Dublin	0-12 - 0-11	Tyrone	Parnell Park

01/03/03; Round 4	Cork	1-10 - 1-9	Galway	Páirc Uí Rinn

02/03/03; Round 4	Armagh	0-14 - 0-9	Roscommon	Crossmaglen

02/03/03; Round 4	Kerry	2-11 - 0-14	Dublin	Killarney

02/03/03; Round 4	Tyrone	1-14 - 0-10	Donegal	Coalisland

09/03/03; Round 5	Galway	0-8 - 2-10	Roscommon	Ballinasloe

09/03/03; Round 5	Tyrone	1-9 - 0-10	Armagh	Omagh

09/03/03; Round 5	Donegal	0-8 - 1-12	Kerry	Ballyshannon

09/03/03; Round 5	Dublin	0-8 - 0-16	Cork	Parnell Park

23/03/03; Round 6	Kerry	0-14 - 1-13	Tyrone	Killarney

23/03/03; Round 6	Armagh	1-14 - 1-17	Galway	Crossmaglen

23/03/03; Round 6	Roscommon	0-14 - 0-17	Dublin	Roscommon

23/03/03; Round 6	Cork	3-8 - 0-10	Donegal	Páirc Uí Rinn

06/04/03; Round 7	Donegal	2-10 - 1-10	Roscommon	Ballybofey

06/04/03; Round 7	Tyrone	1-17 - 0-14	Cork	Dungannon

06/04/03; Round 7	Kerry	1-13 - 2-8	Armagh	Tralee

06/04/03; Round 7	Dublin	0-12 - 1-9	Galway	Parnell Park

=== Division 1B Table ===
Compete in Division 1 semi-finals Automatic relegation to Division 2B

Team	Pld	W	D	L	F	A	Diff	Pts
Laois	7	5	2	0	6-90	9-62	19	12
Fermanagh	7	5	0	2	8-67	2-74	11	10
Cavan	7	4	1	2	12-81	7-82	14	9
Mayo	7	3	0	4	4-73	4-78	-5	6
Meath	7	3	0	4	2-79	5-84	-14	6
Down	7	2	1	4	5-77	5-85	-8	5
Sligo	7	2	0	5	5-72	7-72	-6	4
Kildare	7	2	0	5	5-76	8-78	-11	4

=== Division 1B Rounds 1 to 7 ===
02/02/03; Round 1	Mayo	2-8 - 1-10	Sligo	Castlebar

02/02/03; Round 1	Kildare	2-10 - 3-10	Cavan	Newbridge

02/02/03; Round 1	Meath	0-7 - 0-11	Laois	Navan

02/02/03; Round 1	Fermanagh	0-6 - 0-8	Down	Enniskillen

09/02/03; Round 2	Laois	1-14 - 1-11	Fermanagh	Portlaoise

09/02/03; Round 2	Cavan	1-16 - 0-7	Meath	Cavan

09/02/03; Round 2	Sligo	1-10 - 1-11	Kildare	Sligo

09/02/03; Round 2	Down	0-12 - 1-11	Mayo	Newry

16/02/03; Round 3	Mayo	1-8 - 1-9	Laois	Ballinrobe

16/02/03; Round 3	Meath	0-13 - 0-12	Kildare	Navan

16/02/03; Round 3	Fermanagh	1-11 - 1-9	Cavan	Enniskillen

16/02/03; Round 3	Down	1-10 - 1-11	Sligo	Newry

02/03/03; Round 4	Laois	0-17 - 2-11	Down	Portlaoise

02/03/03; Round 4	Cavan	1-10 - 0-11	Mayo	Cavan

02/03/03; Round 4	Sligo	1-9 - 0-13	Meath	Sligo

02/03/03; Round 4	Kildare	0-9 - 2-8	Fermanagh	Newbridge

09/03/03; Round 5	Mayo	0-12 - 0-9	Kildare	Ballina

09/03/03; Round 5	Fermanagh	3-9 - 0-12	Meath	Enniskillen

09/03/03; Round 5	Down	1-10 - 1-13	Cavan	Newry

09/03/03; Round 5	Laois	1-8 - 0-5	Sligo	Portlaoise

23/03/03; Round 6	Cavan	4-11 - 2-17	Laois	Cavan

23/03/03; Round 6	Kildare	1-16 - 1-11	Down	Newbridge

23/03/03; Round 6	Meath	1-16 - 0-12	Mayo	Navan

23/03/03; Round 6	Sligo	0-11 - 1-10	Fermanagh	Sligo

06/04/03; Round 7	Laois	1-14 - 1-9	Kildare	Portlaoise

06/04/03; Round 7	Cavan	1-12 - 1-16	Sligo	Cavan

06/04/03; Round 7	Down	0-15 - 1-11	Meath	Newcastle

06/04/03; Round 7	Mayo	0-11 - 0-12	Fermanagh	Charlestown

=== Division 1 Semi-finals ===
20/04/03; Semi-final	Tyrone	4-11 - 1-11	Fermanagh	Croke Park

20/04/03; Semi-final	Laois	1-11 - 0-11	Armagh	Croke Park

=== Division 1 Final ===
04/05/03; Final	Tyrone	0-21 - 1-08	Laois	Croke Park

== Division 2 ==
=== Division 2A Table ===
Compete in Division 2 semi-finals and automatic promotion to Division 1A

Team	Pld	W	D	L	F	A	Diff	Pts
Limerick	7	6	0	1	11-89	4-66	44	12
Westmeath	7	6	0	1	6-98	6-54	44	12
Offaly	7	4	1	2	10-79	9-54	28	9
Louth	7	4	0	3	9-83	6-71	21	8
Antrim	7	3	1	3	8-80	7-77	6	7
Leitrim	7	3	0	4	10-63	6-68	7	6
Wicklow	7	1	0	6	4-59	11-96	-58	2
London	7	0	0	7	3-46	12-111	-92	0

=== Division 2A Rounds 1 to 7 ===
01/02/03; Round 1	Antrim	2-15 - 0-8	London	Casement Park

02/02/03; Round 1	Louth	2-10 - 2-12	Offaly	Drogheda

02/02/03; Round 1	Leitrim	1-10 - 1-11	Limerick	Cloone

02/02/03; Round 1	Wicklow	0-5 - 2-16	Westmeath	Aughrim

08/02/03; Round 2	London	1-4 - 0-16	Louth	Ruislip

09/02/03; Round 2	Offaly	2-13 - 1-7	Wicklow	Tullamore

09/02/03; Round 2	Westmeath	0-8 - 0-5	Leitrim	Mullingar

09/02/03; Round 2	Limerick	2-13 - 1-11	Antrim	Limerick

15/02/03; Round 3	Wicklow	0-8 - 2-13	Louth	Aughrim

16/02/03; Round 3	Limerick	2-20 - 0-4	London	Limerick

16/02/03; Round 3	Antrim	2-7 - 0-15	Westmeath	Casement Park

16/02/03; Round 3	Leitrim	2-6 - 1-8	Offaly	Carrick-on-Shannon

02/03/03; Round 4	Louth	1-11 - 2-7	Leitrim	Ardee

02/03/03; Round 4	Offaly	1-9 - 1-9	Antrim	Tullamore

02/03/03; Round 4	Westmeath	0-12 - 0-9	Limerick	Mullingar

02/03/03; Round 4	London	0-9 - 0-12	Wicklow	Ruislip

09/03/03; Round 5	Westmeath	3-19 - 1-7	London	Rochfortbridge

09/03/03; Round 5	Limerick	2-5 - 1-7	Offaly	Kilmallock

09/03/03; Round 5	Leitrim	1-14 - 1-7	Wicklow	Carrick-on-Shannon

09/03/03; Round 5	Antrim	0-8 - 1-13	Louth	Casement Park

23/03/03; Round 6	Wicklow	2-10 - 1-14	Antrim	Aughrim

23/03/03; Round 6	Offaly	1-13 - 1-10	Westmeath	Tullamore

23/03/03; Round 6	Louth	1-12 - 1-14	Limerick	Ardee

23/03/03; Round 6	London	1-7 - 3-12	Leitrim	Ruislip

05/04/03; Round 7	Offaly	2-17 - 0-7	London	Tullamore

06/04/03; Round 7	Limerick	3-17 - 0-10	Wicklow	Kilmallock

06/04/03; Round 7	Antrim	1-16 - 1-9	Leitrim	Casement Park

06/04/03; Round 7	Westmeath	0-18 - 2-8	Louth	Mullingar

=== Division 2B Table ===
Compete in Division 2 semi-finals and automatic promotion to Division 1B

Team	Pld	W	D	L	F	A	Diff	Pts
Longford	7	6	0	1	15-82	3-75	43	12
Wexford	7	6	0	1	6-79	7-57	19	12
Derry	7	5	1	1	15-92	8-59	54	11
Monaghan	7	4	0	3	5-86	11-65	3	8
Carlow	7	3	0	4	5-75	12-75	-21	6
Clare	7	2	0	5	5-86	9-76	-2	4
Waterford	7	1	0	6	7-54	6-110	-53	2
Tipperary	7	0	1	6	8-57	10-94	-43	1

=== Division 2B Rounds 1 to 7 ===
02/02/03; Round 1	Tipperary	1-6 - 1-12	Clare	Ardfinnan

02/02/03; Round 1	Wexford	0-15 - 1-8	Waterford	Enniscorthy

02/02/03; Round 1	Carlow	0-12 - 3-13	Longford	Carlow

09/02/03; Round 1	Longford	1-6 - 1-12	Wexford	Longford

09/02/03; Round 2	Monaghan	1-12 - 0-5	Carlow	Clones

09/02/03; Round 2	Waterford	1-11 - 1-7	Tipperary	Dungarvan

09/02/03; Round 2	Clare	1-10 - 1-14	Derry	Ennis

15/02/03; Round 2	Wexford	2-12 - 2-8	Monaghan	Wexford

16/02/03; Round 3	Longford	3-13 - 0-8	Waterford	Longford

16/02/03; Round 3	Carlow	3-6 - 0-14	Clare	Carlow

16/02/03; Round 3	Derry	1-13 - 2-10	Tipperary	Derry

23/02/03; Round 3	Derry	4-15 - 0-7	Monaghan	Ballinascreen

02/03/03; Round 4	Waterford	2-5 - 1-15	Derry	Dungarvan

02/03/03; Round 4	Tipperary	1-8 - 1-14	Carlow	Ardfinnan

02/03/03; Round 4	Monaghan	0-10 - 1-9	Longford	Clones

02/03/03; Round 4	Clare	0-5 - 0-10	Wexford	Ennis

09/03/03; Round 5	Longford	2-11 - 0-12	Clare	Longford

09/03/03; Round 5	Wexford	1-14 - 0-7	Tipperary	Wexford

09/03/03; Round 5	Carlow	1-8 - 5-13	Derry	Carlow

09/03/03; Round 5	Monaghan	0-18 - 1-6	Waterford	Clones

23/03/03; Round 6	Derry	3-12 - 1-7	Wexford	Derry

23/03/03; Round 6	Tipperary	2-11 - 4-18	Longford	Nenagh

23/03/03; Round 6	Clare	2-10 - 1-19	Monaghan	Ennis

23/03/03; Round 6	Waterford	1-6 - 0-19	Carlow	Dungarvan

06/04/03; Round 7	Clare	1-23 - 1-10	Waterford	Ennis

06/04/03; Round 7	Longford	1-12 - 0-10	Derry	Ballymahon

06/04/03; Round 7	Monaghan	1-12 - 1-8	Tipperary	Clones

06/04/03; Round 7	Wexford	1-9 - 0-11	Carlow	Wexford

=== Division 2 Semi-finals ===
20/04/03; Semi-final	Westmeath	1-16 - 2-12	Longford	Roscommon

20/04/03; Semi-final	Limerick	2-13 - 0-07	Wexford	O'Moore Park

=== Division 2 Final ===
04/05/03; Final	Westmeath	1-16 - 2-12	Limerick	Croke Park

== Statistics ==
- All scores correct as of 6 March 2016

=== Scoring ===
- Widest winning margin: 22
  - Limerick 2-20 - 0-4 London (Division 2a)
- Most goals in a match: 6
  - Carlow 1-8 - 5-13 Derry (Division 2b)
  - Tipperary 2-11 - 4-18 Longford (Division 2b)
  - Cavan 4-11 - 2-17 Laois (Division 1b)
- Most points in a match: 33
  - Clare 1-23 - 1-10 Waterford (Division 2b)
- Most goals by one team in a match: 5
  - Carlow 1-8 - 5-13 Derry (Division 2b)
- Highest aggregate score: 47 points
  - Tipperary 2-11 - 4-18 Longford (Division 2b)
- Lowest aggregate score: 13 points
  - Westmeath 0-8 - 0-5 Leitrim (Division 2a)
