= 1948 Irish Greyhound Derby =

- Venue: Shelbourne Park
- Location: Dublin
- End date: 4 September
- Total prize money: £1,000 (winner)

The 1948 Irish Greyhound Derby took place during August and September with the final being held at Shelbourne Park in Dublin on 4 September 1948.

The winner Western Post won £1,000 which at the time was a record prize for an Irish race. He was trained by Paddy Moclair (a former Irish Gaelic footballer) and owned by Frank Davis from London.

The runner-up Baytown Colonel was under two years old and went on to win the Trafalgar Cup.

== Final result ==
At Shelbourne, 4 September (over 525 yards):

| Position | Name of Greyhound | Breeding | Trap | SP | Time | Trainer |
|---|---|---|---|---|---|---|
| 1st | Western Post | Lucky Post - Lonesome Sister | 5 | 7-2 | 29.90 | Paddy Moclair |
| 2nd | Baytown Colonel | Baytown Cuckoo - Baytown Crow | 6 | 7-1 | 30.22 | Paddy Barry |
| 3rd | Canter Home | Nuacht An Lae - Pretty Munster | 3 | 6-1 | 30.30 | N Carey |
| 4th | Line Command | Joint Command - Cat Pup | 2 | 8-1 | | |
| 5th | Harvest King | Bella's Prince - Fishing Rink | 1 | 5-4f | | Harry O’Neill |
| 6th | Young Shell | Tinker's Smack - Chimeolym | 4 | 10-1 | | |

=== Distances ===
4, 1 (lengths)

== Competition Report ==
Offering a record £1,000 first prize the 1948 Derby attracted the Scottish Greyhound Derby champion Western Post. Paddy Moclair his original owner would train the greyhound for the duration of the competition for Londoner Frank Davis. Moclair had paid £240 for him at Limerick sales before Davis then bought the dog from Moclair and Anthony Watson for £2,000. The fawn and white dog wrote himself into the record books by becoming the first winner of the Scottish and Irish Derby. Despite the reputation of Western Post, the hot favourite throughout the event had been Harvest King owned and trained by Harry O’Neill.

Harvest King from Arklow had impressed during the early rounds including a victory over Western Post and before the semi-finals began he had been sold to Harry O'Neill for £4,000. In the final Harvest King made a poor start and never showed leaving Western Post to overtake the early leader (a bitch called Canter Home) at the halfway mark. He went on to win easily from Baytown Colonel.

== See also ==
1948 UK & Ireland Greyhound Racing Year
