= 1946–47 National Football League (Ireland) =

Gaelic football competition

League details
- Dates: November 1946 – April 1947

League champions
- Winners: Derry (1st win)
- Captain: Pat Keenan
- Manager: "Master" John Fay

League runners-up
- Runners-up: Clare

The 1946–47 National Football League was the 16th staging of the National Football League, an annual Gaelic football tournament for the Gaelic Athletic Association county teams of Ireland.

Due to the extremely harsh winter, so many games had to be called off that the NFL was played off as a four-team tournament with Derry, Longford, Wicklow and Clare competing. Derry won their first league title. Although they had traditionally worn red, they wore white jerseys with a red band in the final, and have kept those colours since.

== Results ==
=== Semi-final ===
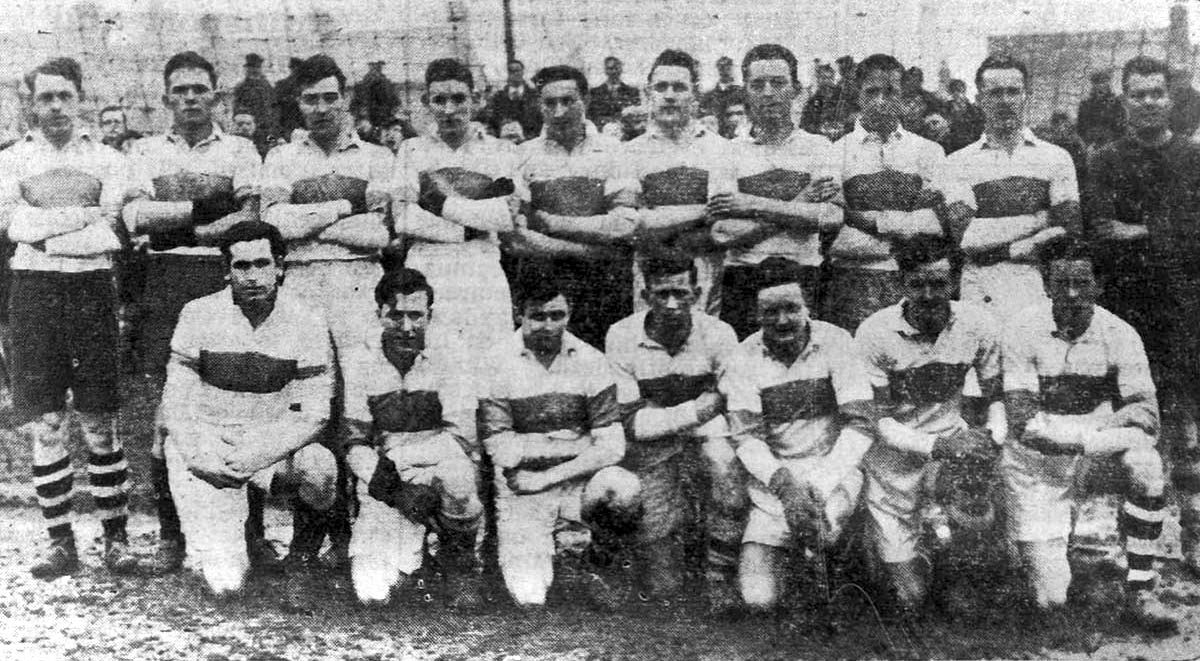
Derry, champions

30 March 1947

Clare	2-6 – 1-6	Wicklow

Ennis

30 March 1947

Derry	2-11 – 2-3	Longford

Derry

=== Final ===
7 April 1947

Derry	2-9 – 2-5	Clare

Croke Park, Dublin
Referee: F Brophy (Dublin)
