= 1974–75 National Football League (Ireland) =

Gaelic football competition

League details
- Dates: October 1974 – 18 May 1975

League champions
- Winners: Meath (4th win)
- Captain: Ronan Giles
- Manager: Micheál O'Brien

League runners-up
- Runners-up: Dublin
- Captain: Seán Doherty
- Manager: Kevin Heffernan

The 1974–75 National Football League was the 44th staging of the National Football League (NFL), an annual Gaelic football tournament for the Gaelic Athletic Association county teams of Ireland.

Meath won a surprise victory over Dublin in the final.

== Format ==
=== Divisions ===
- Division One: 12 teams. Split into two groups of 6.
- Division Two: 6 teams
- Division Three: 14 teams. Split into two groups of 7.

=== Round-robin format ===
Each team played every other team in its division (or group where the division is split) once, either home or away.

=== Points awarded ===
2 points were awarded for a win and 1 for a draw.

=== Titles ===
Teams in all three divisions competed for the National Football League title.

=== Knockout stage qualifiers ===
- Division One (A): top 2 teams
- Division One (B): top 2 teams
- Division Two: group winners
- Division Three: Division winners. Determined by a play-off between the two group winners

=== Knockout phase structure ===
In the quarter-finals, the match-ups were as follows:

- Quarter-final 1: Second-placed team in Division One (A) v First-placed team in Division Two
- Quarter-final 2: Second-placed team in Division One (B) v First-placed team in Division Three

The semi-final match-ups are:

- Semi-final 1: First Placed team in Division One (A) v Winner Quarter-final 1
- Semi-final 2: First Placed team in Division One (B) v Winner Quarter-final 2

The final match-up is: Winner Semi-final 1 v Winner Semi-final 2.

=== Promotion and relegation ===
- Division One: 1 relegation place. Bottom teams in Division One (A) and Division One (B) play-off
- Division Two: group winners promoted to Division One. Bottom team demoted to Division Three.
- Division Three: 1 promotion place. Group winners of Division Three (A) and Division Three (B) play-off

=== Separation of teams on equal points ===
In the event that teams finish on equal points, then teams were separated according to points average(goals scored divided by goals conceded).

== Group stage ==
=== Division One ===
==== Results ====
===== Division One relegation play-off =====
27 April 1975	Kildare	3-5 — 2-6	Wicklow	Croke Park, Dublin

==== Tables ====
===== Group A =====
Team	Pld	W	D	L	F	A	Aver	Pts	Notes
Dublin	5	3	1	1	66	41	1.610	7	Advanced to Knockout stage
Kerry	5	3	1	1	59	40	1.475	7	Advanced to Knockout stage
Cork	5	3	0	2	59	50	1.180	6
Roscommon	5	3	0	2	51	55	0.927	6
Offaly	5	1	0	4	36	55	0.655	2
Kildare	5	1	0	4	43	73	0.589	2

===== Group B =====
Team	Pld	W	D	L	F	A	Aver	Pts	Notes
Mayo	5	5	0	0	71	33	2.152	10	Advanced to Knockout stage
Tyrone	5	4	0	1	59	37	1.595	8	Advanced to Knockout stage
Derry	5	3	0	2	76	38	2.000	6
Galway	5	2	0	3	53	58	0.914	4
Sligo	5	1	0	4	47	76	0.618	2
Wicklow	5	0	0	5	29	93	0.312	0	Relegated to Division Two of the 1975–76 NFL

=== Division Two ===
==== Table ====
Team	Pld	W	D	L	F	A	Aver	Pts	Notes
Meath	5	4	0	1	61	44	1.386	8	Advanced to Knockout stage and promoted to Division One of the 1975–76 NFL
Down	5	4	0	1	48	37	1.297	8
Cavan	5	2	1	2	45	42	1.071	5
Antrim	5	2	0	3	53	49	1.082	4
Fermanagh	5	1	1	3	41	55	0.745	3
Longford	5	0	2	3	43	64	0.672	2	Relegated to Division Three of the 1975–76 NFL

=== Division Three ===
==== Results ====
===== Division Three promotion play-off =====
16 March 1975	Monaghan	1-5 — 0-5	Clare	O'Moore Park, Portlaoise

==== Tables ====
===== Group A =====
Team	Pld	W	D	L	F	A	Aver	Pts	Notes
Monaghan	6	5	0	1	78	40	1.950	10	Advanced to Knockout stage and promoted to Division Two of the 1975–76 NFL
Louth	6	5	0	1	90	54	1.667	10
Armagh	6	4	0	2	75	55	1.364	8
Donegal	6	2	1	3	67	62	1.081	5
Westmeath	6	2	0	4	47	75	0.627	4
Laois	6	1	1	4	56	71	0.789	3
Leitrim	6	1	0	5	45	101	0.446	2

===== Group B =====
Team	Pld	W	D	L	F	A	Aver	Pts	Notes
Clare	6	6	0	0	73	29	2.517	12
Tipperary	6	5	0	1	102	62	1.645	10
Wexford	6	3	0	3	82	67	1.224	6
Limerick	6	3	0	3	78	74	1.054	6
Waterford	6	3	0	3	64	64	1.000	6
Carlow	6	1	0	5	58	81	0.716	2
Kilkenny	6	0	0	6	44	124	0.355	0

== Knockout stage ==
=== Quarter-finals ===
23 March 1975

Meath	0-11 –0-6	Kerry

Croke Park, Dublin

23 March 1975

Tyrone	1-9 –1-7	Monaghan

Croke Park, Dublin

=== Semi-finals ===
27 April 1975

Meath	4-6 –0-8	Mayo

Croke Park, Dublin

4 May 1975

Dublin	3-12 –1-7	Tyrone

Croke Park, Dublin
Attendance: 22,487

=== Finals ===
18 May 1975
Final

Meath	0-16 – 1-9	Dublin

Croke Park, Dublin
Attendance: 40,853
Referee: Harry O'Reilly (Louth)
