= 1928–29 National Football League (Ireland) =

Gaelic football competition

League details
- Dates: October 1928 – 1929

League champions
- Winners: Kerry (2nd win)
- Captain: Joe Barrett

League runners-up
- Runners-up: Kildare
- Captain: Jack Higgins

The 1928–29 National Football League was the 3rd staging of the National Football League, a Gaelic football tournament for the Gaelic Athletic Association county teams of Ireland.

Kerry successfully defended its league title in the final for the second consecutive season against Kildare.

== Format ==
There were four divisions – Northern, Southern, Eastern and Western. Division winners played off for the NFL title.

== Results ==
=== North-Eastern Division ===
Armagh, Monaghan, Louth, Down, Antrim, Cavan.

=== Southern Division ===
==== Results ====
14 October 1928 Round 1	Kerry	2-3 — 0-3	Waterford	Austin Stack Park, Tralee

14 October 1928 Round 1	Clare	2-6 — 3-5	Limerick	Kilrush

28 October 1928 Round 2	Limerick	1-3 — 0-7	Cork	Newcastle West

28 October 1928 Round 2	Waterford	2-3 — 2-1	Clare	Fraher Field, Dungarvan

11 November 1928 Round 3	Kerry	3-6 — 1-4	Tipperary	Thurles

18 November 1928 Round 4	Kerry	4-8 — 2-5	Limerick	Austin Stack Park, Tralee

18 November 1928 Round 4	Cork	3-11 — 0-2	Waterford	Fermoy

10 March 1929 Round 5	Kerry	5-6 — 2-4	Clare	Listowel

10 March 1929 Round 5	Limerick	3-6 — 2-4	Tipperary	Glin

7 April 1929 Round 6	Clare	0-2 — 1-2	Cork	Ennis

14 April 1929 Round 6	Tipperary	1-3 — 0-5	Waterford	Fethard

21 April 1929 Round 7	Kerry	3-7 — 2-4	Cork	Cork

21 April 1929 Round 7	Limerick	1-9 — 1-3	Waterford	Gaelic Grounds, Limerick

==== Table ====
Team	Pld	W	D	L	Pts	Notes
Kerry	5	5	0	0	10	Qualified for Knockout Stage
Cork	5	4	0	1	8

=== South-Eastern Division ===
Kildare won, from Laois,Dublin, Meath and Wexford.

28 October 1928 Round 2	Kildare	4-9 — 1-5	Meath	Newbridge

2 December 1928 Round 2	Offaly	4-2 — 2-6	Longford	Tullamore

=== Western Division ===
Mayo, Sligo, Roscommon and Galway competed.

7 October 1928 Round	Mayo	0-5 — 1-2	Sligo	Castlerea

28 October 1928 Round	Mayo	0-7 — 1-4	Leitrim	Tubbercurry

11 November 1928 Round	Leitrim	3-5 — 1-2	Roscommon	Carrick-on-Shannon

2 December 1928 Round	Galway	0-6 — 1-5	Sligo	Strokestown

16 December 1928 Round	Galway	0-3 — 2-6	Mayo	Tuam

== Knockout stage ==
=== Semi-finals ===
17 November 1929

Kerry	2-5 – 1-2	Sligo

Austin Stack Park, Tralee

4 August 1929

Kildare	4-5 – 0-5	Monaghan

Carrickmacross
Attendance: 4,000

=== Finals ===
1 December 1929
Final

Kerry	1-7 – 2-3	Kildare

Croke Park, Dublin
Attendance: 11,000
Referee: P Farrell (Roscommon)
