= 1930–31 National Football League (Ireland) =

Gaelic football competition

League details
- Dates: 29 June 1930 – May 1931

League champions
- Winners: Kerry (3rd win)
- Captain: Miko Doyle

League runners-up
- Runners-up: Cavan
- Captain: Jim Smith

The 1930–31 National Football League was the 4th staging of the National Football League, a Gaelic football tournament for the Gaelic Athletic Association county teams of Ireland.

Kerry won their third league in a row. They trailed Cavan 1-1 to 0-1 at half-time in the final, but went on to win by a point. After their win, Kerry went on an American tour.

== Format ==
=== Divisions ===
- Division One: 22 teams. Split into four regional groups
- Division Two: 10 teams. Split into two regional sections

=== Round-robin format ===
Each team played every other team in its division (or group where the division is split) once, either home or away.

=== Points awarded ===
2 points were awarded for a win and 1 for a draw.

=== Titles ===
- Teams in Division One competed for the National Football League title.
- Teams in Division Two (Midland) competed for the National Football League Division Two (Midland) title.
- Teams in Division Two (Northern) competed for the National Football League Division Two (Northern) title.

=== Knockout stage qualifiers ===
- Division One title: top team in each group qualified for the semi-final
- Division Two (Midland) title: top team in each group qualified for the final
- Division Two (Northern) title: group winners win the title

== Division One ==
=== Group A ===
23 March 1930 Round 1	Kildare	1-1 — 2-3	Dublin	Newbridge
				Referee: M. Delaney Laois

23 March 1930 Round 1	Kerry	3-8 — 2-0	Laois	Austin Stack Park, Tralee

6 April 1930 Round 2	Dublin	4-5 — 2-2	Wexford	Croke Park, Dublin

6 April 1930 Round 2	Laois	3-2 — 2-6	Kildare	Portlaoise
				Referee: Sean Robbins Offaly

5 October 1930 Round 3	Wexford	1-4 — 3-5	Kildare	Wexford

16 November 1930	Kerry	0-2 — 0-2	Kildare	Naas

16 November 1930	Kerry	w/o — scr.	Wexford

7 December 1930 Round 4	Dublin	0-3 — 0-8	Kerry	Croke Park, Dublin
				Referee: J. Delaney Laois

==== Table ====
Team	Pld	W	D	L	Pts	Status
Kerry	4	3	1	0	7	Advance to Knockout stage
Dublin	4	3	0	1	6
Kildare	4	2	1	1	5
Laois	4	1	0	3	2
Wexford	4	0	0	4	0

=== Group B ===
23 March 1930 Round 1	Clare	2-7 — 2-6	Limerick	Kilrush

23 March 1930 Round 1	Tipperary	3-3 — 2-8	Cork	Clonmel

6 April 1930 Round 2	Cork	3-5 — 1-2	Clare	Cork

6 April 1930 Round 2	Limerick	1-5 — 1-5	Waterford	Glin

9 November 1930 Round 2	Tipperary	1-2 — 3-6	Waterford	Clonmel

7 December 1930 Round 4	Waterford	2-7 — 1-2	Clare	Dungarvan

==== Table ====
Team	Pld	W	D	L	Pts	Status
Waterford	4	3	1	0	7	Advance to Knockout stage
Cork	4	3	0	1	6
Clare	4	2	0	2	4
Limerick	3	0	1	2	1
Tipperary	3	0	0	3	0

=== Group C ===
23 March 1930 Round 1	Antrim	0-2 — 1-2	Monaghan	Corrigan Park, Belfast

23 March 1930 Round 1	Meath	2-8 — 1-2	Armagh	Navan

6 April 1930 Round 2	Louth	2-3 — 0-3	Antrim	Drogheda
				Referee: J. Curran Meath

6 April 1930 Round 2	Monaghan	0-6 — 0-6	Cavan	Clones

5 October 1930 Round 2	Cavan	0-11 — 0-9	Armagh	Armagh

2 November 1930 Round 3	Cavan	W — L	Louth	Breffni Park, Cavan

16 November 1930	Louth	1-2 — 0-7	Armagh	Dundalk

23 November 1930	Meath	1-6 — 0-0	Monaghan	Navan

23 November 1930	Down	1-7 — 2-5	Cavan	Newry

7 December 1930 Round 2	Cavan	5-6 — 0-3	Antrim	Breffni Park, Cavan

7 December 1930 Round 4	Louth	2-3 — 2-3	Meath	Drogheda

7 December 1930 Round 4	Down	w/o — scr	Monaghan

14 December 1930 Round 2	Meath	1-4 — 0-3	Antrim	Navan

18 January 1931 1st Place Play-Off	Cavan	2-6 — 0-2	Meath	Breffni Park, Cavan

=== Group D ===
26 April 1930 Round 1	Sligo	1-2 — 4-4	Mayo	Tubbercurry, Sligo

11 May 1930 Round 1	Galway	2-1 — 0-3	Roscommon	Ballinasloe

29 June 1930 Round 1	Galway	0-7 — 0-1	Mayo	Tuam

20 July 1930 Round 1	Leitrim	3-0 — 0-5	Sligo	Ballinamore, Leitrim

20 July 1930 Round 1	Roscommon	0-3 — 1-7	Mayo	Castlerea

21 September 1930 Round 3	Galway	3-6 — 0-4	Leitrim	Roscommon

1930 Round 4	Mayo	w/o — scr	Leitrim

5 October 1930 Round 4	Galway	2-8 — 0-2	Sligo	Tuam

==== Table ====
Team	Pld	W	D	L	Pts	Status
Galway	4	4	0	0	8	Advance to Knockout stage
Mayo	4	3	0	1	6
Roscommon	4	2	0	2	4
Leitrim	4	1	0	3	2
Sligo	4	0	0	4	0

=== Knockout stage ===
==== Semi-finals ====
15 February 1931

Kerry	2-5 – 1-1	Galway

Tuam

15 February 1931

Cavan	7-5 – 0-3	Waterford

Cavan

==== Final ====
1 March 1931

Kerry	1-3 – 1-2	Cavan
John Joe Landers 1-0, Tim Landers 0-1, Miko Doyle 0-1		Terry Coyle 1-0, Jack Smallhorne 0-1, Louis Blessing 0-1

Croke Park, Dublin
Attendance: 15,000

== Division two ==
=== Midland ===
==== Northern Section ====
23 March 1930 Round 1	Offaly	1-3 — 4-7	Westmeath	Tullamore

6 April 1930 Round 2	Longford	0-2 — 0-3	Offaly	Longford

31 August 1930 Round 3	Westmeath	5-5 — 2-7	Longford	Mullingar
				Referee: Sean O'Neill Dublin

==== Southern Section ====
23 March 1930 Round 1	Carlow	2-6 — 2-0	Wicklow	Muine Bheag

6 April 1930 Round 2	Wicklow	0-2 — 1-4	Kilkenny	Arklow

9 November 1930 Round 3	Kilkenny	1-1 — 1-1	Carlow	Nowlan Park, Kilkenny

==== Final ====
7 December 1930 Final	Westmeath	7-4 — 1-0	Kilkenny	Mullingar

==== Tables ====
===== Northern Section =====
Team	Pld	W	D	L	Pts	Status
Westmeath	2	2	0	0	4	Win Division Two (Midland)
Offaly	2	1	0	1	2
Longford	2	0	0	2	0

===== Southern Section =====
Team	Pld	W	D	L	Pts	Status
Kilkenny	2	1	1	0	3
Carlow	2	1	1	0	3
Wicklow	2	0	0	2	0

=== Northern ===
23 March 1930 Round 1	Donegal	2-6 — 1-1	Tyrone	Erne Park, Ballyshannon
				Referee: T McGlynn Donegal

23 March 1930 Round 1	Fermanagh	1-4 — 1-1	Derry	Enniskillen

6 April 1930 Round 2	Tyrone	3-1 — 2-2	Fermanagh	Dungannon

6 April 1930 Round 2	Derry	1-4 — 2-6	Donegal	Brandywell, Derry

31 August 1930 Round 3	Tyrone	3-2 — 0-3	Derry	Dungannon

5 October 1930 Round 3	Donegal	1-5 — 0-2	Fermanagh	Ballyshannon

==== Table ====
Team	Pld	W	D	L	Pts	Status
Donegal	3	3	0	0	6	Win Division Two (Northern)
Tyrone	3	2	0	1	4
Fermanagh	3	1	0	2	2
Derry	3	0	0	3	0
