= 1981–82 National Football League (Ireland) =

Gaelic football competition

League details
- Dates: October 1981 – 24 May 1982

League champions
- Winners: Kerry (14th win)
- Captain: Jimmy Deenihan
- Manager: Mick O'Dwyer

League runners-up
- Runners-up: Cork
- Captain: Dinny Allen

The 1981–82 National Football League was the 51st staging of the National Football League (NFL), an annual Gaelic football tournament for the Gaelic Athletic Association county teams of Ireland.

Kerry defeated Cork in the final after a replay.

== Format ==
=== Titles ===
Teams in all four divisions competed for one league title.

=== Divisions ===
- Division One: 8 teams
- Division Two: 8 teams
- Division Three: 8 teams
- Division Four: 8 teams

=== Round-robin format ===
Each team played every other team in its division once, either home or away.

=== Points awarded ===
2 points were awarded for a win and 1 for a draw.

=== Knockout stage qualifiers ===
- Division One: top 4 teams
- Division Two: top 2 teams
- Division Three: top team
- Division Four: top team

=== Knockout phase structure ===
In the Preliminary quarter-finals, the match-ups were as follows

- Preliminary Quarter-final 1: Fourth-placed team in Division One v First-placed team in Division Four
- Preliminary Quarter-final 2: Second-placed team in Division Two v First-placed team in Division Three

In the quarter-finals, the match-ups were as follows

- Quarter-final 1: Winner Preliminary Quarter-final 1 v First-placed team in Division Two
- Quarter-final 2: Winner Preliminary Quarter-final 2 v Third-placed team in Division One

The semi-final match-ups are:

- Semi-final 1: First-placed team in Division One v Winner Quarter-final 1
- Semi-final 2: Second-placed team in Division One v Winner Quarter-final 2

=== Separation of teams on equal points ===
In the event that teams finish on equal points, then a play-off will be used to determine group placings if necessary, i.e. where to decide relegation places or quarter-finalists.

== Group stage ==
=== Division One ===
==== Regulation games ====
18 October 1981	Cork	2-9 — 0-9	Mayo	Pairc Ui Chaoimh, Cork

18 October 1981	Offaly	1-11 — 0-12	Dublin	Croke Park

22 November 1981	Roscommon	0-9 — 0-6	Kerry	Dr Hyde Park, Roscommon
				Attendance: 1,500; Referee: P.J. McGrath, Mayo

==== Play-offs ====
7 March 1982 For 3rd Place	Cork	2-9 — 1-5	Kerry	Killarney

14 March 1982 For 2nd Place	Cork	1-11 — 0-8	Offaly	Páirc Uí Chaoimh, Cork

==== Table ====
Team	Pld	W	D	L	Pts	Notes
Armagh	7	4	2	1	10	Qualified for Knockout Stages
Cork	7	4	0	3	8	Qualified for Knockout Stages
Offaly	7	4	0	3	8	Qualified for Knockout Stages
Kerry	7	4	0	3	8	Qualified for Knockout Stages
Dublin	7	3	1	3	7
Mayo	7	3	1	3	7
Galway	7	2	1	4	5	Relegated to Division Two of the 1982–83 NFL
Roscommon	7	1	1	5	3	Relegated to Division Two of the 1982–83 NFL

=== Division Two ===
==== Play-offs ====
7 March 1982 For 2nd Place	Down	0-11 — 0-8	Meath	Dundalk

==== Table ====
Team	Pld	W	D	L	Pts	Status
Derry	7	5	1	1	11	Qualified for Knockout Stage; Promoted to Division One of the 1982–83 NFL
Down	7	4	2	1	10	Qualified for Knockout Stage; Promoted to Division One of the 1982–83 NFL
Meath	7	4	2	1	10
Tyrone	7	2	3	2	7
Kildare	7	2	2	3	6
Cavan	7	3	0	4	6
Fermanagh	7	1	1	5	3	Relegated to Division Three of the 1982–83 NFL
Monaghan	7	1	1	5	3	Relegated to Division Three of the 1982–83 NFL

=== Division Three ===
==== Table ====
Team	Pld	W	D	L	Pts	Status
Wicklow	7	6	0	1	12	Qualified for Knockout Stage; Promoted to Division Two of the 1982–83 NFL
Antrim	7	5	1	1	11	Promoted to Division Two of the 1982–83 NFL
Laois	7	3	1	3	7
Wexford	7	3	1	3	7
Donegal	7	3	0	4	6
Louth	7	3	0	4	6
Tipperary	7	2	1	5	5	Relegated to Division Four of the 1982–83 NFL
Westmeath	7	1	0	6	2	Relegated to Division Four of the 1982–83 NFL

=== Division Four ===
7 March 1982 For 2nd Place	Longford	1-8 — 0-9	Sligo	Carrick-on-Shannon

==== Table ====
Team	Pld	W	D	L	Pts	Status
Clare	7	7	0	0	14	Qualified for Knockout Stage; Promoted to Division Three of the 1982–83 NFL
Longford	7	5	0	2	10	Promoted to Division Three of the 1982–83 NFL
Sligo	7	5	0	2	10
Waterford	7	3	0	4	6
Carlow	7	2	2	3	6
Limerick	7	2	1	4	5
Leitrim	7	1	1	5	3
Kilkenny	7	1	0	6	2

== Knockout stages ==
=== Preliminary quarter-finals ===
14 March 1982

Kerry	4-6 – 1-3	Clare

Ennis

14 March 1982

Down	3-8 – 0-9	Wicklow

Croke Park, Dublin
Attendance: 2,553

=== Quarter-finals ===
21 March 1982

Kerry	1-11 – 0-5	Derry

Croke Park, Dublin

21 March 1982

Offaly	1-9 – 0-12	Down

Croke Park, Dublin

4 April 1982
Replay

Offaly	3-8 – 1-10	Down

Croke Park, Dublin

=== Semi-finals ===
11 April 1982

Kerry	3-14 – 1-5	Armagh

Croke Park, Dublin

11 April 1982

Cork	1-15 – 1-10	Offaly

Croke Park, Dublin

=== Final ===
25 April 1982
Final

Kerry	0-11 – 0-11	Cork

Fitzgerald Stadium, Killarney
Attendance: 30,000
Referee: Seamus Aldridge (Kildare)

24 May 1982
Final Replay

Kerry	1-9 – 0-8	Cork

Páirc Uí Chaoimh, Cork
Attendance: 25,000
Referee: Seamus Aldridge (Kildare)
