= 1933–34 National Football League (Ireland) =

Gaelic football competition

League details
- Dates: November 1933 – 21 October 1934

League champions
- Winners: Mayo (1st win)
- Captain: Gerald Courell

League runners-up
- Runners-up: Dublin
- Captain: Mick Keating

The 1933–34 National Football League was the 7th staging of the National Football League, a Gaelic football tournament for the Gaelic Athletic Association county teams of Ireland, held in 1933 and 1934.

Mayo won the league after a replayed final.

== Format ==
There were four divisions – Northern, Southern, Eastern and Western. Division winners played off for the NFL title.

== Results and Tables ==
=== Group I ===
==== Results ====
12 November 1933 Round 1	Sligo	0-7 — 0-3	Westmeath	Tubbercurry

19 November 1933 Round 1	Roscommon	1-3 — 0-3	Longford	Longford

3 December 1933 Round 2	Sligo	3-5 — 2-2	Longford	Collooney

8 April 1934 Round 2	Westmeath	4-7 — 1-2	Roscommon	Athlone

=== Group II ===
==== Results ====
5 November 1933 Round 1	Kildare	2-9 — 0-4	Wexford	Naas

5 November 1933 Round 1	Laois	1-6 — 2-3	Dublin	Portlaoise

19 November 1933 Round 2	Dublin	1-5 — 0-6	Kildare	Croke Park, Dublin

19 November 1933 Round 2	Kerry	0-8 — 1-3	Laois	Austin Stack Park, Tralee

3 December 1933 Round 3	Dublin	1-9 — 2-3	Wexford	Wexford,

3 December 1933 Round 3	Kildare	w/o — scr	Kerry	Newbridge,

4 March 1934 Round 4	Kerry	w/o — scr.	Wexford

8 April 1934 Round 5	Dublin	2-6 — 1-7	Kerry	Croke Park, Dublin

==== Table ====
Team	Pld	W	D	L	Pts	Status
Dublin	4	3	1	0	7	Qualified for Final
Kildare	4	3	0	1	6
Kerry	4	2	0	2	4
Laois	4	1	1	2	3
Wexford	4	0	0	4	4

=== Division III ===
==== Results ====
12 November 1933 Round 1	Mayo	2-4 — 1-5	Meath	Castlebar

19 November 1933 Round 2	Galway	1-5 — 1-2	Louth	Tuam

19 November 1933 Round 2	Cavan	1-6 — 1-6	Mayo	Cavan

3 December 1933 Round 3	Meath	2-6 — 3-3	Cavan	Navan

3 December 1933 Round 3	Mayo	2-8 — 0-3	Galway	Castlebar

8 April 1934 Round 4	Galway	2-6 — 0-7	Cavan	Breffni Park, Cavan

15 April 1934 Round 4	Mayo	4-3 — 1-3	Louth	Drogheda

==== Table ====
Team	Pld	W	D	L	Pts	Status
Mayo	4	3	1	0	7	Qualified for Final
Galway	4	3	0	1	6
Cavan	3	0	2	1	2
Meath	3	0	1	2	1
Louth	2	0	0	2	0

=== Division IV ===
==== Results ====
5 November 1933 Round 1	Carlow	5-3 — 2-4	Wicklow	Aughrim

5 November 1933 Round 1	Offaly	4-10 — 1-4	Kilkenny	Kilkenny

19 November 1933 Round 2	Carlow	3-4 — 0-3	Kilkenny	Carlow

19 November 1933 Round 2	Offaly	3-8 — 1-3	Wicklow	Tullamore

3 December 1933 Round 3	Offaly	1-5 — 1-4	Carlow	Tullamore

== Final ==
13 May 1934
Final

Mayo	2-3 – 1-6	Dublin
Paddy Moclair 2-0, Paddy Munnelly 0-3		Willie Dowling 1-0, Mickey Wellington 0-4

MacHale Park, Castlebar
Attendance: 10,000
Referee: Tom Shevlin (Roscommon)

21 October 1934
Final Replay

Mayo	2-4 – 1-5	Dublin

Croke Park
Referee: J Kelly (Longford)
