= 1937–38 National Football League (Ireland) =

Gaelic football competition

League details
- Dates: 24 October 1937 – 3 July 1938

League champions
- Winners: Mayo (5th win)
- Captain: Paddy Moclair

League runners-up
- Runners-up: Wexford
- Captain: Peter Hayes

The 1937–38 National Football League was the 11th staging of the National Football League (NFL), an annual Gaelic football tournament for the Gaelic Athletic Association county teams of Ireland.

Mayo successfully defended its league title for the fifth consecutive season in the final, against Meath. This season was notable for featuring the first commentary by Mícheál Ó hEithir, who, along with four others, did a test commentary on Dublin v. Louth in May 1938. Dr Kiernan was so impressed by Ó hEithir's performance that he allowed him to commentate on the entire second half. ɗ

== Format ==
There were two divisions – Division 1 and Division 2.

Division 1 was split into two Groups. Group winners played off for the NFL title.

== Results and tables ==
=== Division 1 ===
==== Group A ====
Team	Pld	W	D	L	Pts	Status
Wexford	6	5	0	1	10	Advance to play-off
Louth	6	5	0	1	10	Advance to play-off
Kildare	6	4	0	2	8
Cavan	6	1	2	3	4
Dublin	6	1	2	3	4
Meath	6	2	0	4	4
Monaghan	6	0	2	4	2

==== Group A play-off ====
22 May 1938

Wexford	1-4 – 1-4	Louth

Croke Park, Dublin

29 May 1938
Replay

Wexford	1-10 – 1-3	Louth

Croke Park, Dublin

==== Group B ====
Team	Pld	W	D	L	Pts	Status
Galway	6	4	0	2	8	Advance to play-off
Mayo	6	5	0	1	8	Advance to play-off
Kerry	6	4	0	2	8	Advance to play-off
Laois	6	3	1	3	7
Longford	6	2	1	3	4
Offaly	6	2	0	4	4
Clare	6	0	0	6	0

- Mayo deducted 2 points for fielding a suspended player

==== Group B play-offs ====
1 May 1938
Semi-Final

Kerry	1-12 – 3-1	Galway

Austin Stack Park, Tralee

15 May 1938
Final

Mayo	2-8 – 0-7	Kerry

MacHale Park, Castlebar

==== Division 1 Final ====
3 July 1938
Final

Mayo	3-9 – 1-3	Wexford
P Flannelly 0-5 (3f); J Munnelly 1-2; PJ Judge 1-1; P Moclair 1-0; J Laffey 0-1

MacHale Park, Castlebar
Attendance: 5,000

=== Division 2 ===
Teams in Division 2 were Wicklow, Carlow, Cork, Waterford, Tipperary
