= Munster Football League =

Gaelic football competition

- Irish: Sraith Peile na Mumhan
- Code: Football
- Founded: 1925
- Abolished: 1935
- Region: Munster (GAA)
- Trophy: McGrath Cup
- No. of teams: 6
- First winner: Kerry
- Most titles: Cork and Tipperary (2 titles)

Munster Football League was a senior inter-county Gaelic football competition established in 1925. The competition was often referred to as the McGrath Cup, as the trophy was presented by Pat McGrath, secretary of the Munster Council.

The competition is not to be confused with the McGrath Cup, which commenced in 1981 and continues to take place at the start of each season.

== Roll of honour ==
Key to list of winners
*	Final won after Replay
†	Final not played

Year	Date	Winner	Runner-up	Venue	Note
1925–26	13 June 1926	Kerry 0-5	Tipperary 0-2	Austin Stack Park, Tralee	This was the final round of the league rather than a final
1929–30	15 June 1930	Tipperary 5-7	Limerick 0-2	Clonmel	
1931–32	2 October 1932	Cork 5-4	Clare 0-1	Cork	
1932–33	22 January 1933	Cork 4-5	Limerick 2-3	Glin	
1933–34	8 April 1934	Clare 2-4	Tipperary 2-2	Ennis	
1934–35		Tipperary	Cork		Tournament was played on a league basis
