= 2002 National Football League (Ireland) =

Gaelic football competition

League details
- Dates: 3 February - 28 April 2002
- Teams: 32

League champions
- Winners: Tyrone (1st win)
- Captain: Peter Canavan
- Manager: Eugene McKenna & Art McRory

League runners-up
- Runners-up: Cavan
- Captain: Anthony Forde
- Manager: Mattie Kerrigan

Other division winners
- Division 2: Kerry

The 2002 Allianz National Football League, the 71st annual Gaelic football tournament, was sponsored by Allianz and included teams from Ireland's Gaelic Athletic Association county teams. This was the first NFL season to take place in a single calendar year. Tyrone beat Cavan in the Division 1 final, while Kerry took Division Two.

== Format ==
=== League structure ===
The top 16 teams were drawn into Divisions 1A and 1B. The other 16 teams were drawn into Divisions 2A and 2B. Each team played all the other teams in its section once: either home or away. Teams earned 2 points for a win and 1 for a draw.

=== Finals, promotions and relegations ===
The top two teams in Divisions 1A and 1B progressed to the Division 1 semi-finals while the bottom two teams in Divisions 1A and 1B were relegated. The top two teams in Divisions 2A and 2B progressed to the Division 2 semi-finals and were promoted to Division 1A and 1B, respectively.

=== Tie-breaker ===
If two or more teams are level on points, points difference was used to rank the teams.

== Division 1 ==
=== Division 1A Table ===
Compete in Division 1 semi-finals Automatic relegation to Division 2A

Team	Pld	W	D	L	F	A	Diff	Pts
Roscommon	7	5	1	1	9-90	9-92	-2	11
Dublin	7	5	0	2	11-92	5-71	39	10
Tyrone	7	5	0	2	8-98	8-68	30	10
Galway	7	3	2	2	9-74	6-77	6	8
Donegal	7	4	0	3	4-77	4-72	5	8
Cork	7	3	0	4	6-73	7-79	-9	6
Offaly	7	2	1	4	7-72	4-88	-7	5
Westmeath	7	1	0	6	4-82	11-79	-18	2

=== Division 1A Rounds 1 to 7 ===
10/02/02; Round 1	Galway	0-9 - 1-8	Tyrone	Ballinasloe

10/02/02; Round 1	Dublin	2-10 - 0-14	Donegal	Parnell Park

17/02/02; Round 1	Offaly	0-13 - 0-16	Donegal	Tullamore

17/02/02; Round 1	Westmeath	0-13 - 3-12	Galway	Mullingar

17/02/02; Round 2	Tyrone	0-18 - 2-10	Dublin	Dungannon

17/02/02; Round 2	Cork	0-10 - 1-9	Roscommon	Páirc Uí Chaoimh

23/02/02; Round 2	Offaly	1-7 - 0-10	Dublin	Tullamore

24/02/02; Round 2	Tyrone	3-20 - 0-14	Roscommon	Omagh

24/02/02; Round 3	Westmeath	1-14 - 1-6	Cork	Mullingar

24/02/02; Round 3	Donegal	0-7 - 0-9	Galway	Ballybofey

03/03/02; Round 3	Roscommon	1-15 - 2-11	Offaly	Roscommon

03/03/02; Round 3	Galway	1-8 - 1-11	Cork	Tuam

03/03/02; Round 4	Dublin	3-13 - 1-16	Westmeath	Parnell Park

03/03/02; Round 4	Donegal	1-10 - 0-11	Tyrone	Ballybofey

10/03/02; Round 4	Cork	1-13 - 0-10	Dublin	Páirc Uí Chaoimh

10/03/02; Round 4	Westmeath	0-7 - 1-7	Donegal	Mullingar
10/03/02; Round 4		Report		Mullingar

10/03/02; Round 5	Offaly	1-4 - 1-11	Tyrone	Tullamore

16/03/02; Round 5	Roscommon	3-11 - 3-11	Galway	Roscommon

18/03/02; Round 5	Cork	1-11 - 2-11	Offaly	Páirc Uí Chaoimh

18/03/02; Round 5	Roscommon	0-16 - 0-12	Westmeath	Roscommon

24/03/02; Round 6	Tyrone	2-15 - 2-8	Westmeath	Pomeroy

24/03/02; Round 6	Galway	1-13 - 0-15	Offaly	Ballinasloe

24/03/02; Round 6	Donegal	1-12 - 0-9	Cork	Ballyshannon

24/03/02; Round 6	Dublin	0-16 - 2-12	Roscommon	Parnell Park

31/03/02; Round 7	Roscommon	2-13 - 1-12	Donegal	Roscommon

31/03/02; Round 7	Offaly	1-11 - 0-12	Westmeath	Tullamore

31/03/02; Round 7	Cork	2-13 - 1-15	Tyrone	Páirc Uí Chaoimh

31/03/02; Round 7	Galway	1-12 - 1-12	Dublin	Tuam

=== Division 1B Table ===
Compete in Division 1 semi-finals Automatic relegation to Division 2B

Team	Pld	W	D	L	F	A	Diff	Pts
Mayo	7	6	0	1	9-84	7-57	33	12
Cavan	7	5	0	2	6-88	5-76	15	10
Fermanagh	7	4	1	2	7-81	4-79	11	9
Kildare	7	4	1	2	6-84	10-66	6	9
Sligo	7	3	1	3	3-80	5-71	3	7
Down	7	2	0	5	6-70	3-91	-12	4
Derry	7	1	1	5	6-72	5-83	-8	3
Clare	7	1	0	6	7-50	11-86	-48	2

=== Division 1B Rounds 1 to 7 ===
03/02/02; Round 1	Down	1-17 - 1-13	Fermanagh	Newry

10/02/02; Round 1	Fermanagh	1-14 - 1-8	Clare	Enniskillen

10/02/02; Round 1	Derry	1-10 - 1-15	Cavan	Glen

10/02/02; Round 1	Kildare	0-12 - 0-12	Sligo	Newbridge

10/02/02; Round 2	Mayo	0-10 - 0-5	Down	Ballina

17/02/02; Round 2	Kildare	1-15 - 1-11	Derry	Newbridge

17/02/02; Round 2	Clare	1-6 - 2-19	Mayo	Ennis

17/02/02; Round 2	Cavan	0-16 - 0-14	Fermanagh	Cavan

17/02/02; Round 3	Sligo	0-11 - 0-10	Down	Sligo

24/02/02; Round 3	Cavan	1-9 - 1-12	Kildare	Cavan

24/02/02; Round 3	Sligo	0-10 - 0-11	Mayo	Sligo

24/02/02; Round 3	Clare	2-5 - 0-7	Derry	Ennis

03/03/02; Round 4	Mayo	2-14 - 2-12	Cavan	Ballinrobe

03/03/02; Round 4	Down	2-11 - 0-9	Clare	Newry

03/03/02; Round 4	Fermanagh	1-13 - 1-9	Kildare	Enniskillen

03/03/02; Round 4	Derry	1-10 - 0-14	Sligo	Derry

10/03/02; Round 5	Kildare	0-7 - 4-5	Mayo	Newbridge

10/03/02; Round 5	Sligo	3-11 - 1-9	Clare	Sligo

10/03/02; Round 5	Cavan	0-14 - 1-8	Down	Cavan

10/03/02; Round 5	Derry	0-9 - 0-9	Fermanagh	Derry

23/03/02; Round 6	Clare	0-7 - 1-12	Cavan	Milltown-Malbay

24/03/02; Round 6	Fermanagh	2-9 - 0-11	Sligo	Enniskillen

24/03/02; Round 6	Down	1-10 - 1-17	Kildare	Newry

24/03/02; Round 6	Mayo	0-16 - 2-8	Derry	Crossmolina

31/03/02; Round 7	Sligo	0-11 - 1-10	Cavan	Sligo

31/03/02; Round 7	Kildare	2-12 - 2-6	Clare	Newbridge

31/03/02; Round 7	Fermanagh	2-9 - 1-9	Mayo	Enniskillen

31/03/02; Round 7	Derry	1-17 - 1-9	Down	Ballinascreen

=== Division 1 Semi-finals ===
14/04/02; Semi-final	Roscommon	3-12 - 5-13	Cavan	Mullingar

14/04/02; Semi-final	Mayo	0-11 - 3-12	Tyrone	Enniskillen

=== Division 1 Final ===
28/04/02; Final	Tyrone	0-16 - 0-07	Cavan	Clones

== Division 2 ==
=== Division 2A Table ===
Compete in Division 2 semi-finals and automatic promotion to Division 1A

Team	Pld	W	D	L	F	A	Diff	Pts
Armagh	7	6	0	1	17-97	5-67	66	12
Kerry	7	5	0	2	11-92	5-71	39	10
Limerick	7	5	0	2	11-88	5-84	22	10
Louth	7	4	1	2	7-99	4-70	38	9
Leitrim	7	3	1	3	6-73	8-78	-11	7
Antrim	7	3	0	4	4-78	8-70	-4	6
Wicklow	7	1	0	6	3-81	8-75	-9	2
London	7	0	0	7	1-34	17-127	-141	0

=== Division 2A Rounds 1 to 7 ===
03/02/02; Round 1	Kerry	1-15 - 0-12	Wicklow	Killarney

03/02/02; Round 1	Armagh	1-14 - 0-13	Louth	Armagh

03/02/02; Round 1	London	0-5 - 1-19	Antrim	Ruislip

10/02/02; Round 1	Louth	2-19 - 0-1	London	Drogheda

10/02/02; Round 2	Antrim	1-11 - 2-11	Limerick	Casement Park

10/02/02; Round 2	Wicklow	0-13 - 2-10	Armagh	Aughrim

10/02/02; Round 2	Leitrim	0-9 - 2-12	Kerry	Carrick-on-Shannon

17/02/02; Round 2	Armagh	3-16 - 0-9	Leitrim	Carrick-on-Shannon

17/02/02; Round 3	Louth	2-18 - 0-12	Wicklow	Drogheda

17/02/02; Round 3	Kerry	0-14 - 0-7	Antrim	Tralee

17/02/02; Round 3	London	0-10 - 3-22	Limerick	Ruislip

24/02/02; Round 3	Limerick	2-16 - 2-10	Leitrim	Kilmallock

03/03/02; Round 4	Limerick	2-12 - 0-16	Kerry	Limerick

03/03/02; Round 4	Wicklow	2-21 - 1-1	London	Aughrim

03/03/02; Round 4	Antrim	1-11 - 3-12	Armagh	Casement Park

03/03/02; Round 4	Leitrim	0-13 - 1-10	Louth	Cloone

10/03/02; Round 5	London	0-4 - 4-13	Kerry	Ruislip

10/03/02; Round 5	Armagh	2-19 - 2-6	Limerick	Carrickcruppen

10/03/02; Round 5	Louth	1-9 - 1-10	Antrim	Dundalk

10/03/02; Round 5	Wicklow	0-9 - 2-5	Leitrim	Aughrim

23/03/02; Round 6	Limerick	0-8 - 0-12	Louth	Kilmallock

24/03/02; Round 6	Kerry	2-10 - 2-9	Armagh	Tralee

24/03/02; Round 6	Leitrim	1-16 - 0-8	London	Carrick-on-Shannon

24/03/02; Round 6	Antrim	0-13 - 1-8	Wicklow	Casement Park

31/03/02; Round 7	Louth	1-18 - 2-12	Kerry	Ardee

31/03/02; Round 7	Leitrim	1-11 - 0-7	Antrim	Cloone

31/03/02; Round 7	Wicklow	0-6 - 0-13	Limerick	Aughrim

31/03/02; Round 7	London	0-5 - 4-17	Armagh	Ruislip

=== Division 2B Table ===
Compete in Division 2 semi-finals and automatic promotion to Division 1B

Team	Pld	W	D	L	F	A	Diff	Pts
Meath	7	5	1	1	10-76	6-54	34	11
Laois	7	5	1	1	9-92	7-80	18	11
Wexford	7	5	0	2	9-77	10-52	22	10
Tipperary	7	4	1	2	7-75	6-80	-2	9
Longford	7	3	0	4	11-77	6-78	14	6
Monaghan	7	1	2	4	6-67	9-79	-21	4
Carlow	7	2	0	5	4-66	6-88	-28	4
Waterford	7	0	1	6	4-64	10-83	-37	1

=== Division 2B Rounds 1 to 7 ===
03/02/02; Round 1	Waterford	1-5 - 0-10	Wexford	Dungarvan

03/02/02; Round 1	Laois	0-10 - 1-7	Tipperary	Portarlington

10/02/02; Round 1	Wexford	2-10 - 2-9	Longford	Enniscorthy

10/02/02; Round 1	Tipperary	1-17 - 1-10	Waterford	Ardfinnan

10/02/02; Round 2	Carlow	1-7 - 0-11	Monaghan	Carlow

10/02/02; Round 2	Meath	0-9 - 0-12	Laois	Navan

17/02/02; Round 2	Laois	2-16 - 1-11	Carlow	Portarlington

17/02/02; Round 2	Waterford	1-12 - 4-13	Longford	Dungarvan

17/02/02; Round 3	Tipperary	1-7 - 0-14	Meath	Ardfinnan

17/02/02; Round 3	Monaghan	1-6 - 1-8	Wexford	Ballybay

23/02/02; Round 3	Longford	1-14 - 0-8	Carlow	Keenagh

24/02/02; Round 3	Monaghan	3-7 - 2-10	Meath	Scotstown

03/03/02; Round 4	Meath	3-11 - 0-6	Waterford	Navan

03/03/02; Round 4	Wexford	2-19 - 2-12	Laois	New Ross

03/03/02; Round 4	Longford	1-12 - 0-11	Monaghan	Longford

03/03/02; Round 4	Carlow	0-12 - 1-11	Tipperary	Carlow

10/03/02; Round 5	Meath	2-14 - 0-6	Carlow	Navan

10/03/02; Round 5	Laois	1-14 - 1-11	Longford	Portarlington

10/03/02; Round 5	Waterford	0-8 - 0-8	Monaghan	Dungarvan

10/03/02; Round 5	Tipperary	0-3 - 3-10	Wexford	Ardfinnan

24/03/02; Round 6	Wexford	1-9 - 2-7	Meath	Wexford

24/03/02; Round 6	Monaghan	1-11 - 2-16	Laois	Clontibret

24/03/02; Round 6	Longford	1-11 - 1-12	Tipperary	Longford

24/03/02; Round 6	Carlow	0-12 - 0-11	Waterford	Carlow

31/03/02; Round 7	Carlow	2-10 - 0-11	Wexford	Carlow

31/03/02; Round 7	Tipperary	2-18 - 1-13	Monaghan	Ardfinnan

31/03/02; Round 7	Waterford	1-12 - 2-12	Laois	Dungarvan

31/03/02; Round 7	Meath	1-11 - 1-7	Longford	Navan

=== Division 2 Semi-finals ===
14/04/02; Semi-final	Kerry	0-11 - 0-08	Meath	Gaelic Grounds

14/04/02; Semi-final	Armagh	0-08 - 0-12	Laois	Longford

=== Division 2 Final ===
28/04/02; Final	Kerry	1-09 - 1-05	Laois	Gaelic Grounds

== Statistics ==
- All scores correct as of 6 March 2016

=== Scoring ===
- Widest winning margin: 24
  - Louth 2-19 - 0-1 London (Division 2a)
  - London 0-5 - 4-17 Armagh (Division 2a)
- Most goals in a match: 6
  - Roscommon 3-11 - 3-11 Galway (Division 1a)
- Most points in a match: 34
  - Tyrone 3-20 - 0-14 Roscommon (Division 1a)
- Most goals by one team in a match: 4
  - Waterford 1-12 - 4-13 Longford (Division 2b)
  - London 0-5 - 4-17 Armagh (Division 2a)
  - London 0-4 - 4-13 Kerry (Division 2a)
  - Kildare 0-7 - 4-5 Mayo (Division 1b)
- Highest aggregate score: 43 points
  - Tyrone 3-20 - 0-14 Roscommon (Division 1a)
  - Wexford 2-19 - 2-12 Laois (Division 2b)
- Lowest aggregate score: 15 points
  - Mayo 0-10 - 0-5 Down (Division 1b)
