= 1938–39 National Football League (Ireland) =

Gaelic football competition

League details
- Dates: November 1938 – 14 May 1939

League champions
- Winners: Mayo (6th win)
- Captain: Paddy Moclair

League runners-up
- Runners-up: Meath
- Captain: Matt Gilsenan

The 1938–39 National Football League was the 12th staging of the National Football League, an annual Gaelic football tournament for the Gaelic Athletic Association county teams of Ireland.

30 counties participated in the league, with Kilkenny and Fermanagh being the non-participants.

Mayo won the league for the sixth consecutive season, beating Meath in the final.

== Format ==
There were seven groups.

Group A had originally been drawn with five teams. When Mayo entered, they were added to Group A, which was then split into two sections for the round-robin stage.

The winners of Groups A, B and C qualified automatically for the semi-final.,

The winners of Groups D, E, F and G played off for the remaining semi-final place

== Results and Tables ==
=== Group A ===
==== Section One play-offs ====
12 March 1939
Semi-final

Mayo	4-3 – 0-5	Galway

Castlebar

26 March 1939
Final

Mayo	1-6 – 0-6	Kerry

Austin Stack Park, Tralee

==== Group Final ====
16 April 1939

Mayo	0-8 – 0-7	Laois

Croke Park, Dublin

==== Section One Table ====
Team	Pld	W	D	L	Pts	Status
Mayo	2	1	0	1	2	Advance to Knockout Stage
Kerry	2	1	0	1	2
Galway	2	1	0	1	2

==== Section Two Table ====
Team	Pld	W	D	L	Pts	Status
Laois	2	1	1	0	4
Kildare	2	1	0	1	2
Offaly	2	0	1	1	0

- Laois were awarded full points for their draw v Offaly, as Offaly were late fielding out.

=== Group B ===
Team	Pld	W	D	L	Pts	Status
Wexford	4	4	0	0	8	Advance to Semi-final
Carlow	4	2	1	1	5
Tipperary	4	2	1	1	5
Wicklow	4	1	0	3	2
Waterford	4	0	0	4	0

=== Group C ===
==== Play-Off ====
23 April 1939
Final

Meath	1-7 – 1-6	Louth

Navan

Team	Pld	W	D	L	Pts	Status
Meath	6	4	2	0	10	Advance to Knockout Stage
Louth	6	4	2	0	10
Cavan	6	3	3	0	9
Dublin	6	2	1	3	5
Monaghan	6	2	0	4	4
Armagh	6	1	0	5	2
Down	6	1	0	5	2

=== Group D ===
Team	Pld	W	D	L	Pts	Status
Leitrim	2	2	0	0	4	Advance to inter-group play-offs
Sligo	2	1	0	1	2
Donegal	2	0	0	1	0

=== Group E ===
Team	Pld	W	D	L	Pts	Status
Roscommon	2	2	0	0	4	Advance to inter-group play-offs
Longford	2	1	0	1	2
Westmeath	2	0	0	1	0

=== Group F ===
Team	Pld	W	D	L	Pts	Status
Derry	2	2	0	0	4	Advance to inter-group play-offs
Tyrone	2	1	0	1	2
Antrim	2	0	0	1	0

=== Group G ===
Team	Pld	W	D	L	Pts	Status
Limerick	2	2	0	0	4	Advance to inter-group play-offs
Clare	2	1	0	1	2
Cork	2	0	0	1	0

=== Inter-group play-offs ===
==== Semi-finals ====
12 March 1939

Derry	1-5 – 0-3	Leitrim

Newbridge
12 March 1939

Roscommon	1-3 – 1-2	Limerick

Glin

==== Final ====
26 March 1939
Final

Roscommon	2-7 – 3-3	Derry

Newbridge

=== Semi-finals ===
30 April 1939
Semi-final

Mayo	3-7 – 0-6	Wexford

Wexford Park, Wexford

30 April 1939
Semi-final

Meath	2-5 – 1-4	Roscommon

Dr. Hyde Park, Roscommon

=== National League Final ===
14 May 1939
Final

Mayo	5-9 – 0-6	Meath

James Stephens Park, Ballina
Attendance: 10,000
