= 1934–35 National Football League (Ireland) =

Gaelic football competition

League details
- Dates: October 1934 – 4 August 1935

League champions
- Winners: Mayo (2nd win)
- Captain: Gerald Courell

League runners-up
- Runners-up: Fermanagh

The 1934–35 National Football League was the 8th staging of the National Football League (NFL), a Gaelic football tournament for the Gaelic Athletic Association county teams of Ireland.

Mayo successfully defended its league title in the final for the second consecutive season against Fermanagh by 21 points, remaining a record for an NFL final in 2017.

== Format ==
There were four divisions – Northern, Southern, Eastern and Western. Division winners played off for the NFL title.

== League Stage ==
=== Northern Division ===
Fermanagh won.

=== Southern Division (Munster Football League) ===
Waterford withdrew before the competition started.

28 October 1934 Round 1	Clare	0-4 — 1-4	Tipperary	Kilrush

11 November 1934 Round 1	Cork	1-8 — 1-5	Kerry	UCC GAA, Cork

11 November 1934 Round 1	Limerick	0-2 — 4-2	Clare	Foynes

25 November 1934 Round 2	Tipperary	4-3 — 0-8	Cork	Clonmel GAA Ground, Clonmel

10 March 1935 Round 2	Clare	w/o — scr.	Kerry	Kilfenora

24 March 1935 Round 2	Tipperary	w/o — scr.	Kerry	Clonmel

24 March 1935 Round 3	Cork	w/o — scr.	Clare	Cork

Kerry	w/o — scr.	Limerick

Tipperary	w/o — scr.	Limerick

Cork	w/o — scr.	Limerick

==== Table ====
Team	Pld	W	D	L	Pts	Status
Tipperary	4	4	0	0	8	Win Munster Football League; advance to knockout stage
Cork	4	3	0	1	6
Clare	4	2	0	2	4
Kerry	4	2	0	2	4
Limerick	4	0	0	4	0

=== Eastern Division ===
??

=== Western Division ===
Mayo won, ahead of Dublin, Louth, Meath, Galway, Laois and Kildare.

== Knockout stage ==
6 June 1935
Semi-final

Mayo	6-8 – 2-5	Tipperary

Clonmel GAA Ground, Clonmel

4 August 1935
Final

Mayo	5-8 – 0-2	Fermanagh
Gerald Courell 3-0; Paddy Moclair 2-2; Paddy Munnelly 0-3; Josie Munnelly, Peter Laffey 0-1 each

MacHale Park, Castlebar
Attendance: 2,000
Referee: J Kelly (Longford)

== Division Two ==
=== Leinster ===
Wicklow, Kilkenny, Carlow

29 October 1934 Round 1	Carlow	5-8 — 0-2	Kilkenny	Kilkenny

24 March 1935 Round 1	Carlow	3-11 — 3-5	Kilkenny	Muine Bheag

31 March 1935 Round 1	Wicklow	3-3 — 0-6	Kilkenny	Nowlan Park, Kilkenny

4 August 1935 Round 1	Wicklow	1-5 — 1-8	Carlow	Baltinglass

=== Midland ===
Roscommon, Westmeath

11 November 1934 Round 1	Longford	1-10 — 1-2	Roscommon

=== Final ===
27 October 1935 Final	Carlow	2-10 — 4-3	Cork	Carlow
