= 1935–36 National Football League (Ireland) =

Gaelic football competition

League details
- Dates: 13 October 1935 – 19 April 1936

League champions
- Winners: Mayo (3rd win)
- Captain: Gerald Courell

The 1935–36 National Football League was the 9th staging of the National Football League, a Gaelic football tournament for the Gaelic Athletic Association county teams of Ireland.

Mayo successfully defended its league title for the third consecutive season, without a final; the league being decided on points.

== Format ==
This was the first NFL season not to be decided with a knockout final: the team with the most points were winners. This would not happen again until 2020, when the league finals were cancelled due to the COVID-19 pandemic.

== Results ==
=== Table ===
Mayo finished first with 12 points from eight games. They had wins over Kildare, Louth, Laois, Galway, Tipperary and Cavan, and lost to Dublin and Meath.

Team	Pld	W	D	L	Pts
Mayo	8	6	0	2	12
Dublin	8	5	0	3	10
Louth	8	5	0	3	10
Cavan	8	5	0	3	10
Laois	8	5	0	3	10
Meath	8	3	1	4	7
Galway	8	3	1	4	7
Kildare	8	2	0	6	2
Tipperary	8	1	0	7	0

== Leinster Football League ==
=== League Stage ===
13 October 1935 1	Wexford	3-4 — 1-3	Carlow	Muine Bheag

27 October 1935 1	Longford	1-5 — 1-5	Offaly	Longford

10 November 1935 2	Longford	1-6 — 0-3	Wexford	Enniscorthy

10 November 1935 2	Offaly	6-7 — 1-2	Wicklow	Tullamore

24 November 1935 3	Wexford	2-10 — 1-3	Wicklow	Aughrim

24 November 1935 3	Longford	2-7 — 1-1	Carlow	Longford

8 December 1935 4	Wicklow	1-2 — 0-2	Carlow	Tullow

8 December 1935 4	Offaly	3-2 — 1-3	Wexford	Wexford Park

8 March 1936 5	Offaly	6-5 — 2-5	Carlow	Tullamore

8 March 1936 5	Longford	2-18 — 3-1	Wicklow	Bray

=== Play-Off ===
29 March 1936 For 1st Place	Offaly	3-5 — 1-6	Longford	Mullingar

=== Final Table ===
Team	Pld	W	D	L	Pts	Status
Offaly	5	3	1	0	7	Leinster Football League Champions
Longford	5	3	1	0	7
Wexford	5	2	0	2	4
Wicklow	5	1	0	3	2
Carlow	5	0	0	4	0
