= 1940–41 National Football League (Ireland) =

National football league in Ireland

League details
- Dates: October 1940 – 27 April 1941

League champions
- Winners: Mayo (7th win)
- Captain: Henry Kenny

League runners-up
- Runners-up: Dublin
- Captain: P. Holly

The 1940–41 National Football League was the 14th staging of the National Football League, an annual Gaelic football tournament for the Gaelic Athletic Association county teams of Ireland.

Mayo returned to the league and won a seventh title. Petrol rationing (due to The Emergency / Second World War) made the playing of the NFL prohibitively expensive and difficult and the tournament was suspended until the end of the war.

22 counties competed in the league.

== Format ==
There were four regional divisions, with 7 teams in the Southern Division and 5 in the Northern, Eastern and Western Divisions. Division winners played off for the NFL title.

== Results ==
=== Northern Division ===
Down won, from Fermanagh, Tyrone, Derry, Antrim.

8 December 1940 Round 4	Down	4-7 — 2-5	Derry	Newcastle

=== Group B, Southern Division ===
Kerry won, ahead of Kildare, Galway, Laois, Offaly, Wexford and Cork.

13 October 1940 Round 1	Cork	4-2 — 1-6	Kildare	Cork Athletic Grounds

13 October 1940 Round 1	Galway	0-9 — 1-0	Wexford	Wexford Park, Wexford

13 October 1940 Round 1	Offaly	1-3 — 1-6	Laois	Tullamore

27 October 1940 Round 2	Kildare	1-7 — 1-8	Kerry	Naas

27 October 1940 Round 2	Galway	1-12 — 2-2	Cork	Loughrea

27 October 1940 Round 2	Laois	5-10 — 1-6	Wexford	Portlaoise

10 November 1940 Round 3	Kerry	0-6 — 0-5	Galway	Listowel

24 November 1940 Round 3	Laois	1-12 — 0-6	Kerry	Portlaoise

24 November 1940 Round 3	Offaly	4-3 — 0-2	Cork	Tullamore

24 November 1940 Round 3	Galway	2-2 — 0-6	Kildare	Tuam

8 December 1940 Round 4	Kerry	1-8 — 1-5	Offaly	Austin Stack Park, Tralee

8 December 1940 Round 4	Cork	0-9 — 0-3	Wexford	Cork Athletic Grounds, Cork

8 December 1940 Round 4	Kildare	3-6 — 2-7	Laois	Athy

26 January 1941 Round 5	Wexford	1-5 — 4-12	Kerry	Enniscorthy

2 February 1941 Round 6	Offaly	2-8 — 0-6	Kildare	O'Connor Park, Tullamore

23 February 1941 Round 6	Kerry	1-4 — 0-6	Cork	Kenmare

=== Group C, Eastern Division ===
Dublin won, from Westmeath, Louth, Meath, Longford.

=== Group A, Western Division ===
Mayo won, ahead of Cavan, Roscommon, Donegal and Sligo.

13 October 1940 Round 1	Cavan	1-5 — 1-9	Mayo	Breffni Park, Cavan

27 October 1940 Round 2	Mayo	0-7 — 0-7	Roscommon	Castlebar

27 October 1940 Round 2	Mayo	1-10 — 0-5	Donegal	Ballina

== Knockout phase ==
=== Semi-finals ===
9 March 1941
Semi-final

Dublin	2-7 – 1-4	Kerry

Croke Park, Dublin

9 March 1941
Semi-final

Mayo	0-11 – 1-4	Down
J Munnelly 0-6; PJ Munnelly 0-4; T Hoban 0-1

Newcastle

=== Final ===
27 April 1941
Final

Mayo	3-5 – 0-7	Dublin
Josie Munnelly 2-2; Peter Laffey 1-2; PJ Judge 0-1

Croke Park, Dublin
Attendance: 7,700
