= 1936–37 National Football League (Ireland) =

Gaelic football competition

League details
- Dates: 11 October 1936 – 11 April 1937

League champions
- Winners: Mayo (4th win)
- Captain: Paddy Moclair

League runners-up
- Runners-up: Meath
- Captain: Paddy Geraghty

Other division winners
- Division 2: Longford

The 1936–37 National Football League was the 10th staging of the National Football League, an annual Gaelic football tournament for the Gaelic Athletic Association county teams of Ireland.

Mayo successfully defended its league title in the final for the fourth consecutive season, against Meath.

== Format ==
There were two divisions – Division 1 and Division 2.

Division 1 was split into two Groups, A (east) and B (west). Group winners played off for the NFL title.

Division 2 was split into two Groups. Group winners played off for the NFL (Division 2) title.

== Division 1 ==
=== Group A ===
==== Table ====
Team	Pld	W	D	L	Pts	Status
Meath	6	5	0	1	10	Advance to League Final
Cavan	6	4	0	2	8
Kildare	6	4	0	2	8
Louth	6	2	0	4	4
Wexford	6	2	0	4	4
Dublin	6	2	0	4	4
Monaghan	6	2	0	4	4

=== Group B ===
==== Table ====
Team	Pld	W	D	L	Pts	Status
Mayo	6	6	0	0	12	Advance to League Final
Kerry	6	5	0	1	10
Galway	6	2	1	3	5
Laois	6	2	1	3	5
Offaly	6	2	1	3	5
Tipperary	6	1	1	4	3
Clare	6	1	0	5	2

=== Final ===
11 April 1937
Final

Mayo	5-4 – 1-8	Meath
P Munnelly 2-1; J Munnelly 1-2; J Carney, P Laffey 1-0 each; P Flannelly 0-1f

Croke Park, Dublin

== Division 2 ==
=== Group A ===
Longford won. Other teams in this group: Sligo, Westmeath, Roscommon, Leitrim

=== Group B ===
Donegal won. Other teams in this group: Armagh, Tyrone, Derry, Fermanagh

=== Final ===
7 March 1937
Final

Longford	1-7 – 1-3	Donegal

Ardara, Donegal
