= National Football League (Ireland) =

Annual Gaelic football competition

- Current season or competition: 2027 National Football League
- Irish: Sraith Náisiúnta Peile
- Code: Gaelic football
- Founded: 1925–1926; 100 years ago
- Region: Ireland (GAA)
- Trophy: Irish National Insurance Cup
- No. of teams: 32
- Title holders: Donegal (2nd title)
- Most titles: Kerry (24 titles)
- Sponsors: Allianz
- TV partner(s): TG4, Eir Sport, GAAGO (live games); RTÉ2 (highlights)
- Motto: Where your edge belongs
- Official website: www.gaa.ie/football/football-league-roinn-1/

This article is about a Gaelic Football competition that is held annually. For other leagues of the same name and other uses, see National Football League (disambiguation) and NFL (disambiguation).

The National Football League (NFL; Irish: Sraith Náisiúnta Peile) is an annual Gaelic football competition between the senior county teams of Ireland plus London. Sponsored by Allianz, it is officially known as the Allianz National Football League.

The Gaelic Athletic Association organises the league. The winning team receives the New Ireland Cup, presented by the New Ireland Assurance Company. The National Football League is the second most prestigious inter-county Gaelic Football competition after the All-Ireland Senior Football Championship.

Unlike many league competitions in sport, each team plays the other teams in their division only once. Teams that meet in the same division over the course of a number of years often play on a home and away basis in alternative years, though this is not strictly adhered to. Once the divisional matches have been played, the latter stages of the league become a knockout competition for the top teams in each division. This is seen as good preparation for the upcoming All-Ireland Championship and there is usually more intensity to the division finals than those played earlier in the league, but still lacking the intensity of Championship matches.

Donegal are the current league champions, having won the 2026 league.

== History ==
The National Football League was first held in 1925–26, thirty-eight years after the first All-Ireland Senior Football Championship. Laois won the inaugural National Football League. The NFL has traditionally played second fiddle to the All-Ireland Senior Football Championship, with most counties using it as preparation for that event. This was not helped by the fact that the league was initially played in winter (usually November–March), while the Championship had the more attractive summer dates and knockout structure.

Mayo dominated the early NFL, winning seven titles in eight seasons until the tournament was suspended during the Second World War. For many seasons in the 1950s and 1960s, the winners of the "home" league played New York in the NFL final; the journey to New York formed an additional prize for the winners. New York won three of these finals.

In 2002, the league was changed to a February–April calendar. This increased interest, boosted attendances and led to live games being broadcast on TG4. The 2009 season was broadcast live on Setanta Sports. Coverage of the 2010 finals in Croke Park saw TG4 become the most watched channel, with 650,000 viewers tuning in to watch some of the games. The Division 1 Final had an average audience of 220,000 viewers.

The National Football League winners receive the Irish National Insurance Cup, first presented to Kerry in 1928–29. Kerry is the most successful team in the competition, having played in the final on twenty-nine occasions and won twenty-three of these. Both of these (final appearances and wins) are records. Kerry also is the team to have most often achieved the "double", by winning both the league title and the All-Ireland Senior Football Championship.

== Schedule ==
In the 20th century, National League fixtures were played during inter-county windows in the later and early months of the calendar year, while the SFC occupied the inter-county window during those months that made up the middle of the year, e.g. May, August. Club competitions of lesser importance occurred alongside the inter-county games so as to provide meaningful game time for players possessed of insufficient ability to compete at the higher (inter-county) level.

From 2002, National League fixtures were played during the early months of the calendar year, preceding the SFC, which remained in the traditional mid-year position. An April club window allowed inter-county players to return to their clubs to participate in some early rounds of the more important club competitions, i.e. championship fixtures.

This arrangement was disrupted during the COVID-19 pandemic. Due to the impact of the pandemic on Gaelic games, the 2020 National League was suspended in March and all Gaelic games ceased until the middle of the year, when club fixtures were first to resume. The National League was then completed in October, ahead of the All-Ireland Senior Football Championship (which was completed in December). This led to a motion (passed at the 2021 GAA Congress) to adopt a "split season" model, whereby club competitions would occupy one part of the calendar year and inter-county fixtures the other part.

== Winners ==
County	Title(s)	Runners-up	Years won	Years runner-up
Kerry	24	8	1927–28, 1928–29, 1930–31, 1931–32, 1958–59, 1960–61, 1962–63, 1968–69, 1970–71, 1971–72, 1972–73, 1973–74, 1976–77, 1981–82, 1983–84, 1996–97, 2004, 2006, 2009, 2017, 2020, 2021 (shared), 2022, 2025	1956–57, 1964–65, 1979–80, 1986–87, 2008, 2016, 2019, 2026
Dublin	14	15	1952–53, 1954–55, 1957–58, 1975–76, 1977–78, 1986–87, 1990–91, 1992–93, 2013, 2014, 2015, 2016, 2018, 2021 (shared)	1925–26, 1933–34, 1940–41, 1951–52, 1961–62, 1966–67, 1974–75, 1976–77, 1987–88, 1988–89, 1998–99, 2011, 2017, 2020, 2024
Mayo	13	9	1933–34, 1934–35, 1935–36, 1936–37, 1937–38, 1938–39, 1940–41, 1948–49, 1953–54, 1969–70, 2000–01, 2019, 2023	1950–51, 1970–71, 1971–72, 1977–78, 2007, 2010, 2012, 2022, 2025
Cork	8	6	1951–52, 1955–56, 1979–80, 1988–89, 1998–99, 2010, 2011, 2012	1931–32, 1947–48, 1978–79, 1981–82, 1996–97, 2015
Meath	7	6	1932–33, 1945–46, 1950–51, 1974–75, 1987–88, 1989–90, 1993–94	1936–37, 1938–39, 1939–40, 1949–50, 1954–55, 1955–56, 1999–2000
Derry	7	6	1946–47, 1991–92, 1994–95, 1995–96, 1999–2000, 2008, 2024	1958–59, 1960–61, 1975–76, 1997–98, 2009, 2014
Galway	4	7	1939–40, 1956–57, 1964–65, 1980–81	1965–66, 1983–84, 2000–01, 2004, 2006, 2018, 2023
Down	4	4	1959–60, 1961–62, 1967–68, 1982–83	1962–63, 1963–64, 1969–70, 1989–90
New York (Note: New York received a bye to the final in ten NFL seasons between 1949–50 and 1988–89. They are not counted as runners-up for these seasons as they did not have to play any games to reach the final.)	3	—N/a	1949–50, 1963–64, 1966–67	—N/a
Donegal	2	3	2007, 2026	1992–93, 1994–95, 1995–96
Tyrone	2	2	2002, 2003	1991–92, 2013
Laois	2	1	1925–26, 1985–86	2003
Cavan	1	5	1947–48	1930–31, 1932–33, 1952–53, 1959–60, 2002
Armagh	1	3	2005	1982–83, 1984–85, 1993–94
Roscommon	1	2	1978–79	1973–74, 1980–81
Offaly	1	2	1997–98	1968–69, 1972–73
Monaghan	1	1	1984–85	1985–86
Longford	1	0	1965–66	–
Kildare	0	5	–	1927–28, 1928–29, 1957–58, 1967–68, 1990–91
Wexford	0	3	–	1937–38, 1945–46, 2005
Carlow	0	1	–	1953–54
Louth	0	1	–	1948–49
Clare	0	1	–	1946–47
Fermanagh	0	1	–	1934–35

=== Wins by provinces ===
Province	Title(s)
Munster	32
Leinster	25
Connacht	18
Ulster	18
North America	3

== Division 1 ==
=== 2027 teams ===
The following eight teams are competing in Division 1 during the 2027 league.

Team	Position in table in 2026	In Division since	Most recent relegation	Division 1 titles
Armagh	6th	2025	2023	1
Cork	Division 2 runners-up	2027	2016	8
Donegal	Champions	2025	2023	1
Galway	5th	2023	2021	4
Kerry	Runners-Up	2003	2001	24
Mayo	3rd	2022	2020	13
Meath	Division 2 champions	2027	2020	7
Roscommon	4th	2026	2024	1

== Division 2 ==
=== 2027 teams ===
The following eight teams are competing in Division 2 during the 2027 league.

Team	Position in table in 2026	In Division since	Most recent promotion	Most recent relegation	Division 2 titles
Cavan	6th	2024	2018	2020	0
Derry	4th	2026	2023	2017	1
Down	Division 3 champions	2027	2016	2025	0
Dublin	7th (Division 1)	2027	2023	Never Relegated	1
Louth	3rd	2023	2006	2018	2
Monaghan	8th (Division 1)	2027	2025	2012	3
Tyrone	5th	2026	2016	Never Relegated	1
Wexford	Division 3 runners-up	2027	Never Promoted	2013	0

=== List of Finals ===
Year	Winners		Runners-up		Venue
Year	County	Score	County	Score	Venue
2026	Meath	1-22	Cork	2-17	Croke Park
2025	Monaghan	1-26	Roscommon	0-19	Croke Park
2024	Donegal	0-15	Armagh	0-14	Croke Park
2023	Dublin	4-06	Derry	0-11	Croke Park
2022	Roscommon	1-20	Galway	0-22	Croke Park
2021	Kildare and Mayo share the title				N/A
2020	Roscommon	0-11	Armagh	0-09	Croke Park
2019	Donegal	1-17	Meath	1-15	Croke Park
2018	Roscommon	4-16	Cavan	4-12	Croke Park
2017	Galway	0-18	Kildare	0-16	Croke Park
2016	Tyrone	1-17	Cavan	0-15	Croke Park
2015	Roscommon	1-17	Down	0-15	Croke Park
2014	Monaghan	1-16	Donegal	1-10	Croke Park
2013	Derry	1-18	Westmeath	0-15	Croke Park
2012	Kildare	0-16	Tyrone	0-11	Croke Park
2011	Donegal	2-11	Laois	0-16	Croke Park
2010	Armagh	0-17	Down	1-12	Croke Park
2009	Cork	1-14	Monaghan	0-12	Croke Park
2008	Westmeath	0-15	Dublin	0-10	Páirc Tailteann
2007	Meath	2-12	Roscommon	0-10	Breffni Park
2006	Louth	1-12 (R)	Donegal	1-09	Breffni Park
2005	Monaghan	3-13	Meath	3-12	Croke Park
2004	Offaly	1-16	Down	2-12	Croke Park
2003	Westmeath	1-16	Limerick	2-12	Croke Park
2002	Kerry	1-09	Laois	1-05	Gaelic Grounds
2001	Westmeath		Cork		
2000	Louth	1-13	Offaly	0-13	Croke Park
1999	Kerry and Sligo won Division 2A and 2B respectively				

=== Roll of Honour ===
#	County	Titles	Runners-up	Years won	Years runners-up
1	Roscommon	4	2	2015, 2018, 2020, 2022	2007, 2025
2	Donegal	3	2	2011, 2019, 2024	2006, 2014
2	Westmeath	3	1	2001, 2003, 2008	2013
2	Monaghan	3	1	2005, 2014, 2025	2009
5	Meath	2	2	2007, 2026	2005, 2019
5	Kildare	2	1	2012, 2021	2017
5	Kerry	2	0	1999, 2002	-
5	Louth	2	0	2000, 2006	-
9	Cork	1	2	2009	2001, 2026
9	Armagh	1	2	2010	2020, 2024
9	Offaly	1	1	2004	2000
9	Derry	1	1	2013	2023
9	Tyrone	1	1	2016	2012
9	Galway	1	1	2017	2022
9	Dublin	1	1	2023	2008
9	Sligo	1	0	1999	-
9	Mayo	1	0	2021	-
18	Down	0	3	-	2004, 2010, 2015
18	Laois	0	2	-	2002, 2011
18	Cavan	0	2	-	2016, 2018
18	Limerick	0	1	-	2003

== Division 3 ==
=== 2027 teams ===
The following eight teams are competing in Division 3 during the 2027 league.

Team	Position in table in 2026	In Division since	Most recent promotion	Most recent relegation	Division 3 titles
Carlow	Division 4 champions	2027	Never Promoted	2019	0
Clare	6th	2024	2016	Never Relegated	1
Kildare	7th (Division 2)	2027	2025	Never Relegated	0
Laois	4th	2025	2019	2021	0
Longford	Division 4 runners-up	2027	2012	2023	1
Offaly	8th (Division 2)	2027	2025	2014	1
Sligo	5th	2024	2010	2019	1
Westmeath	3rd	2026	2024	2016	2

=== List of Finals ===
Year	Winners		Runners-up		Venue
Year	County	Score	County	Score	Venue
2026	Down	0-21	Wexford	0-18	Croke Park
2025	Offaly	2-17	Kildare	1-18	Croke Park
2024	Westmeath	2-10	Down	0-13	Croke Park
2023	Cavan	0-16	Fermanagh	1-07	Croke Park
2022	Louth	1-14	Limerick	1-12	Croke Park
2021	Derry	0-21	Offaly	1-06	Croke Park
2020	Cork	14 pts	Down	9 pts	N/A
2019	Westmeath	1-13	Laois	0-13	Croke Park
2018	Armagh	1-16	Fermanagh	0-17	Croke Park
2017	Tipperary	3-19	Louth	0-19	Croke Park
2016	Clare	2-17	Kildare	1-19	Croke Park
2015	Armagh	0-16	Fermanagh	0-11	Croke Park
2014	Roscommon	1-17	Cavan	0-18	Croke Park
2013	Monaghan	2-16	Meath	3-08	Croke Park
2012	Longford	1-12	Wexford	0-13	Croke Park
2011	Louth	1-15	Westmeath	0-13	Croke Park
2010	Sligo	0-19	Antrim	1-11	Croke Park
2009	Tipperary	0-18	Down	1-14	Pearse Park
2008	Wexford	3-15	Fermanagh	0-20	Parnell Park

=== Roll of Honour ===
#	County	Titles	Runners-up	Years won	Years runners-up
1	Louth	2	1	2011, 2022	2017
1	Westmeath	2	1	2019, 2024	2011
1	Tipperary	2	0	2009, 2017	-
1	Armagh	2	0	2015, 2018	-
5	Down	1	3	2026	2009, 2020, 2024
5	Wexford	1	2	2008	2012, 2026
5	Cavan	1	1	2023	2014
5	Offaly	1	1	2025	2021
5	Sligo	1	0	2010	-
5	Longford	1	0	2012	-
5	Monaghan	1	0	2013	-
5	Roscommon	1	0	2014	-
5	Clare	1	0	2016	-
5	Cork	1	0	2020	-
5	Derry	1	0	2021	-
16	Fermanagh	0	4	-	2008, 2015, 2018, 2023
16	Kildare	0	2	-	2016, 2025
16	Antrim	0	1	-	2010
16	Meath	0	1	-	2013
16	Laois	0	1	-	2019
16	Limerick	0	1	-	2022

== Division 4 ==
=== 2027 teams ===
The following eight teams are competing in Division 4 during the 2027 league.

Team	Position in table in 2026	In Division since	Most recent promotion	Division 4 titles
Antrim	4th	2026	2021	1
Fermanagh	7th (Division 3)	2027	2012	0
Leitrim	7th	2026	2024	0
Limerick	8th (Division 3)	2027	2025	4
London	6th	2008	Never promoted	0
Tipperary	5th	2024	2022	1
Waterford	8th	2012	2010	0
Wicklow	3rd	2025	2020	3

=== List of Finals ===
Year	Winners		Runners-up		Venue
Year	County	Score	County	Score	Venue
2026	Carlow	1-24	Longford	2-18	Croke Park
2025	Limerick	3-11	Wexford	0-18	Croke Park
2024	Laois	3-14	Leitrim	0-09	Croke Park
2023	Sligo	2-10	Wicklow	0-14	Croke Park
2022	Cavan	2-10	Tipperary	0-15	Croke Park
2021	Antrim and Louth share the title				
2020	Limerick	10 pts	Wicklow	10 pts	N/A
2019	Derry	0-20	Leitrim	0-16	Croke Park
2018	Laois	0-15	Carlow	0-11	Croke Park
2017	Westmeath	2-24	Wexford	2-11	Croke Park
2016	Louth	3-12	Antrim	1-14	Croke Park
2015	Offaly	4-16	Longford	1-12	Croke Park
2014	Tipperary	1-16	Clare	1-15	Croke Park
2013	Limerick	0-16	Offaly	1-11	Croke Park
2012	Wicklow	2-16	Fermanagh	1-11	Croke Park
2011	Longford	2-11	Roscommon	1-08	Croke Park
2010	Limerick	1-16	Waterford	1-14	Croke Park
2009	Sligo	1-12	Antrim	1-10	Pearse Park
2008	Offaly	2-13	Tipperary	0-13	O'Moore Park

=== Roll of Honour ===
#	County	Titles	Runners-up	Years won	Years runners-up
1	Limerick	4	0	2010, 2013, 2020, 2025	-
2	Offaly	2	1	2008, 2015	2013
2	Louth	2	0	2016, 2021	-
2	Sligo	2	0	2009, 2023	-
2	Laois	2	0	2018, 2024	-
6	Longford	1	2	2011	2015, 2026
6	Wicklow	1	2	2012	2020, 2023
6	Tipperary	1	2	2014	2008, 2022
6	Antrim	1	2	2021	2009, 2016
6	Carlow	1	1	2026	2018
6	Westmeath	1	0	2017	-
6	Derry	1	0	2019	-
6	Cavan	1	0	2022	-
14	Leitrim	0	2	-	2019, 2024
14	Wexford	0	2	-	2017, 2025
14	Waterford	0	1	-	2010
14	Roscommon	0	1	-	2011
14	Fermanagh	0	1	-	2012
14	Clare	0	1	-	2014

== See also ==
- Ladies' National Football League
- National Hurling League
