= Paddy Moclair =

Mayo Gaelic footballer

Personal information
- Native name: Pádraig Mocléir (Irish)
- Born: 1 September 1907 Castlebar, County Mayo, Ireland
- Died: 9 May 1983 (aged 75) Ballina, County Mayo, Ireland
- Occupation: Bank clerk / Publican

Sport
- Sport: Gaelic football
- Position: Full-forward
Clubs
- Years: Club
- 1929–1943: Castlebar Mitchels; Ballina Stephenites
Club titles
- Mayo titles: 9
Inter-county
- Years: County
- 1930–1942: Mayo
Inter-county titles
- Connacht titles: 7
- All-Irelands: 1
- NFL: 6
- All Stars: 1

Paddy Moclair (1 September 1907 – 9 May 1983) was an Irish Gaelic footballer who played as a full-forward and as a full-back at senior level for the Mayo county team. After retiring from Gaelic football he was a leading greyhound trainer.

== Gaelic football career ==
Moclair joined the team during the 1930 championship and was a regular member of the starting fifteen until his retirement following the conclusion of the 1942 championship. During that time he won one All-Ireland medal, seven Connacht medals, six National League medals and one All-Time All Star Award.

Moclair experienced a fourteen-year club career with Castlebar Mitchels and Ballina Stephenites, winning nine county championship medals.

== Retirement ==
After retiring from Gaelic football he took up the training of racing greyhounds and gained a good reputation. His training career culminated in winning the 1948 Irish Greyhound Derby with a greyhound called Western Post on 4 September 1948.

== Cup ==
Starting in 1971, the Paddy Moclair Cup is awarded to the winners of the Mayo Senior Football Championship.

Sporting positions
Preceded by Séamus O'Malley	Mayo Senior Football Captain; 1937–1939	Succeeded by
Awards
Preceded by Tommy Murphy (Laois)	GAA All-Time All Star Award; 1982	Succeeded by Jim McCullough (Armagh)
