= 1936 All-Ireland Senior Football Championship =

Football championship

All-Ireland Champions
- Winning team: Mayo (1st win)
- Captain: Séamus O'Malley

All-Ireland Finalists
- Losing team: Laois
- Captain: J. McDonnell

Provincial Champions
- Munster: Kerry
- Leinster: Laois
- Ulster: Cavan
- Connacht: Mayo

Championship statistics

The 1936 All-Ireland Senior Football Championship was the 50th staging of Ireland's premier Gaelic football knock-out competition. In the All Ireland semi-final Laois ended Cavan's year as All Ireland champions. Mayo won their first title.

== Results ==
=== Connacht Senior Football Championship ===
24 May 1936
Semi-Final

Mayo	5–6 – 0–4	Sligo
G Ormsby (1–0), T McNicholas (1–1), J Munnelly (0–1), G Courell (0–1), S O’Malley (1–0), P Munnelly (1–2).

James Stephens Park, Ballina

7 June 1936
Semi-Final

Galway	2–6 – 1–4	Roscommon

Castlerea
Attendance: 4,000

19 July 1936
Final

Mayo	2–4 – 1–7	Galway
J Munnelly (0–1), P Laffey (0–1); G Courell (2–0), P Munnelly (0–1).

St. Coman's Park, Roscommon
Attendance: 20,000

2 August 1936
Final Replay

Mayo	2–7 – 1–4	Galway
P Flannelly (1–4, four points from frees), G Ormsby (0–1, free), J Munnelly (1–1), P Munnelly (0–1).

St. Coman's Park, Roscommon
Attendance: 15,000

=== Leinster Senior Football Championship ===
3 May 1936
Preliminary Round

Carlow	2–6 – 2–0	Wexford

Nowlan Park, Kilkenny

3 May 1936
Preliminary Round

Offaly	6–5 – 0–11	Westmeath

O'Connor Park, Tullamore
Attendance: 1,300
Referee: P Waters (Kildare)

24 May 1936
Quarter-Final

Offaly	0–8 – 1–3	Dublin

Cusack Park, Mullingar
Referee: JV Kelly (Longford)

7 June 1936
Quarter-Final

Kildare	0–12 – 1–6	Meath
P.Byrne 0–8, T.Mulhall 0–2, R.O'Hara, P.Martin 0–1.

Cusack Park, Mullingar

14 June 1936
Quarter-Final

Louth	2–5 – 1–5	Wexford

Wexford Park, Wexford

28 June 1936
Semi-Final

Laois	4–5 – 3–4	Offaly

Geraldine Park, Athy
Referee: P Waters (Kildare)

5 July 1936
Semi-Final

Kildare	1–8 –1-4	Louth
P. Martin 1–1, P. Byrne 0–3, T. Mulhall, P. Bourke, M. Geraghty, R. O'Hara 0–1.

Páirc Tailteann, Navan

19 July 1936
Final

Laois	3–3 – 0–8	Kildare
John O'Reilly 3–0 and Tom Keogh 0–3		Paddy Byrne 0-4f, Paddy Martin 0–2, Mick Brosnan and Paddy Burke 0–1

Croke Park, Dublin
Attendance: 13,567
Referee: Martin Lynch (Carlow)

=== Munster Senior Football Championship ===
24 May 1936
Quarter-Final

Kerry	7–7 – 1–4	Limerick
Miko Doyle (0–1), Gearoid Fitzgerald (0–1), Charlie O'Sullivan (4–4), John Joe Landers (2–0) & Tim Landers (1–1).

Foynes

24 May 1936
Semi-Final

Clare	2–6 – 1–3	Cork
		R. Harnedy (1–0), M. Duggan (0–1) & D. O'Sullivan (0–2).

Cusack Park, Ennis

12 July 1936
Semi-Final

Kerry	1–5 – 0–5	Tipperary
Dan Spring (0–1), John Joe Landers (1–0) & Tim Landers (0–3).

Gaelic Grounds, Limerick
Referee: J. O'Regan (CIare)

26 July 1936
Final

Kerry	1–11 – 2–2	Clare
Sean Brosnan (0–1), Paddy Kennedy (0–3), Willie Brick (0–1), John Joe Landers (1–1), Charlie O'Sullivan (0–1) & Tim Landers (0–4).

Gaelic Grounds, Limerick

=== Ulster Senior Football Championship ===
14 June 1936
Quarter-Final

Armagh	0–11 – 2–1	Antrim

Belfast

14 June 1936
Quarter-Final

Down	4–6 – 2–3	Tyrone

Warrenpoint

21 June 1936
Quarter-Final

Donegal	1–8 – 0–7	Fermanagh

Brewster Park, Enniskillen

28 June 1936
Quarter-Final

Monaghan	3–5 – 2–8	Down

Carrickmacross

12 July 1936
Quarter-Final Replay

Monaghan	4–9 – 0–4	Down

Pairc Esler, Newry

19 July 1936
Semi-Final

Armagh	2–1 – 1–8	Cavan

Athletic Grounds, Armagh

26 July 1936
Semi-Final

Monaghan	2–8 – 0–11	Donegal

Carrickmacross

9 August 1936
Final

Cavan	1–7 – 0–7	Monaghan

St. Mary's Park, Castleblayney

=== All-Ireland Senior Football Championship ===
9 August 1936
Semi-Final

Mayo	1–5 – 0–6	Kerry
P Flannelly (1–3, two points from frees) & J Munnelly (0–2).		Miko Doyle (0–1), Gearoid Fitzgerald (0–1), John Joe Landers (0–1), Mick Ferriter (0–1) & Tim Landers (0–2).

St. Coman's Park, Roscommon

23 August 1936
Semi-Final

Laois	2–6 – 1–5	Cavan

Croke Park, Dublin

27 September 1936
Final

Mayo	4–11 – 0–5	Laois
Patsy Flannelly (0–2), Jackie Carney (1–0), Tommy Grier (0–1), Josie Munnelly (2–3), Paddy Moclair (0–5), Paddy Munnelly (1–0).		B.Delaney (0-2), T. Keogh, D. Douglas & J. O'Reilly (0-1) each.

Croke Park, Dublin
Attendance: 50,168
Referee: Sean McCarthy (Kerry)

== Championship statistics ==
=== Miscellaneous ===
- Roscommon's pitch becomes known as St. Coman's Park, until 1971 when it was replaced by Dr. Hyde Park.
- The following GAA grounds are named after famous people, Fitzgerald Stadium, Killarney after Dick Fitzgerald, Dr. Cullen Park in Carlow after Matthew Cullen & Cusack Park in Ennis after Michael Cusack.
- Laois win the Leinster title for the first time since 1889.
- Mayo are All Ireland champions for the first time ever becoming the second from Connacht after Galway in 1925 to do so.
