= 2027 National Football League (Ireland) =

2027 Gaelic football competition in Ireland and London

League details
- Dates: 23 January – 28 March 2027
- Teams: 32

League champions

The 2027 National Football League, known for sponsorship reasons as the Allianz Football League, will be the 96th staging of the National Football League (NFL), an annual Gaelic football tournament for county teams. Thirty-one county teams from Ireland, plus London, will compete. Kilkenny do not compete in senior football.

== Format ==
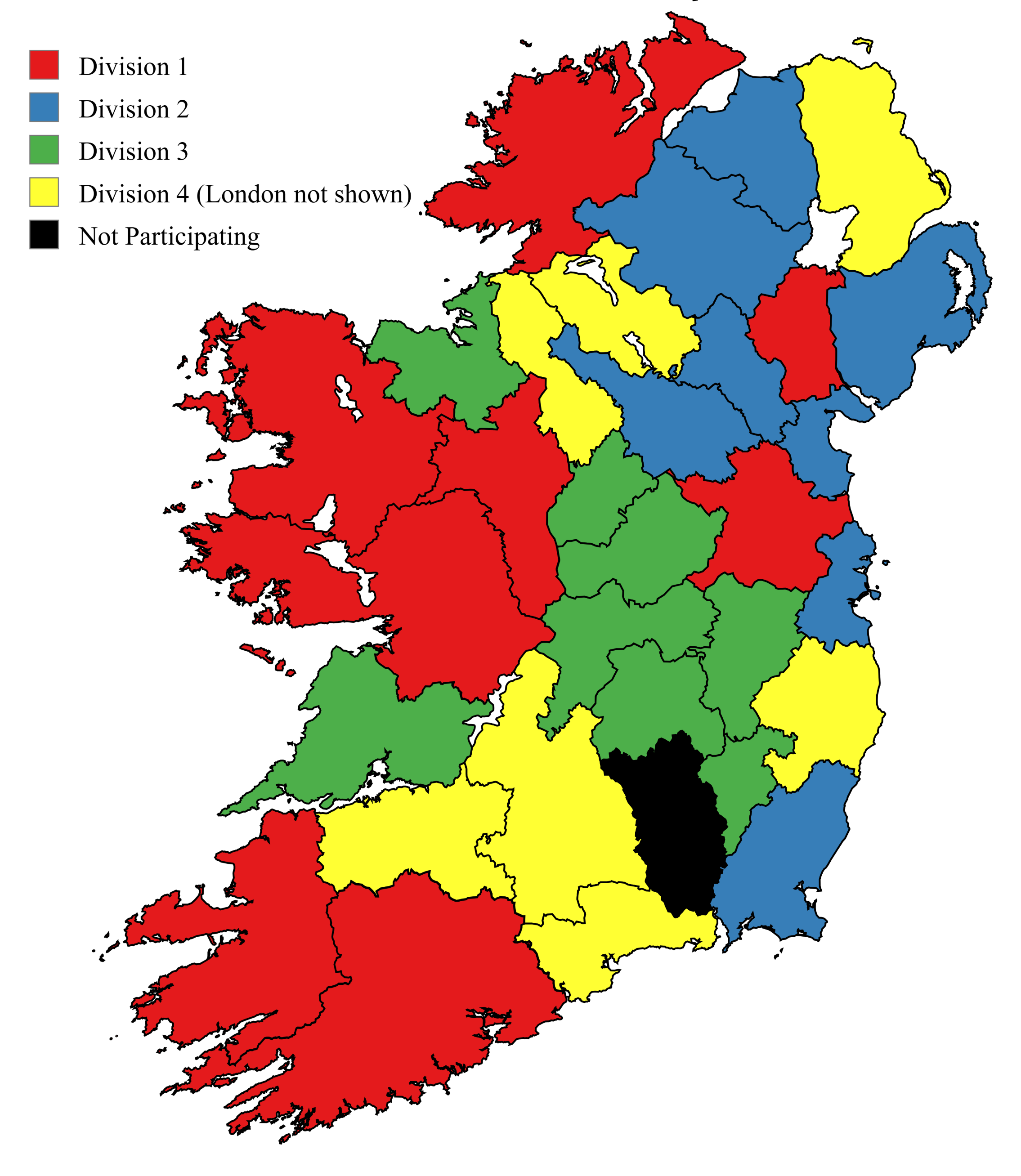
A map showing the leagues in which each county will participate.

=== League structure ===
Teams by Province and Division
Province	Division 1	Division 2	Division 3	Division 4	Total
Connacht	3	0	1	1	5
Leinster	1	3	6	1	11
Munster	2	0	1	3	6
Ulster	2	5	0	2	9
England	0	0	0	1	1
Total	8	8	8	8	32

The 2027 National Football League will consist of four divisions of eight teams. Each team plays every other team in its division once. Two points are awarded for a win, one point is awarded for a draw and none are awarded for a loss.

In the top division, Division 1, teams compete to become the National Football League (NFL) champions. The top two teams qualify for the NFL Final, with the winners crowned NFL champions.

Teams compete for promotion and relegation to a higher or lower league. In Divisions 2, 3 and 4, the first and second-places teams are promoted and play in the respective divisional finals, while the bottom two teams of divisions 1, 2 and 3 are relegated.

=== Tiebreakers for league ranking ===
As per the Official GAA Guide - Part 1 - Section 6.21 -

If two teams in the same group are equal on points on completion of the league phase, the following tie-breaking criteria are applied:

1. Where two teams only are involved - the outcome of the meeting of the two teams in the previous game in the Competition;

If three or more teams in the same group are equal on points on completion of the league phase, the following tie-breaking criteria are applied:

1. Scoring Difference (subtracting the total scores against from total scores for);
2. Highest Total Score For;
3. A Play-Off.

In the event that two teams or more finish with equal points, but have been affected by a disqualification, loss of game on a proven objection, retirement or walkover, the tie shall be decided by the following means:

1. Score Difference from the games in which only the teams involved, (teams tied on points), have played each other. (subtracting the total Scores Against from total Scores For)
2. Highest Total Score For, in which only the teams involved, have played each other, and have finished equal in (i)
3. A Play-Off

== Teams ==
Thirty-two counties compete in the National Football League: every Irish county except Kilkenny, who is replaced by London.

County	Last title		2026 result	Division	Home Stadium		
County	Division 1	Any Division	2026 result	Division	Place	Name	Capacity
Antrim	–	2021 (Division 4)	Division 4 – 4th	Division 4	Belfast	Corrigan Park	3,700
Armagh	2005	2018 (Division 3)	Division 1 – 6th	Division 1	Armagh	Athletic Grounds	18,500
Carlow	–	2026 (Division 4)	Division 4 – 1st (Champions)	Division 3	Carlow	Netwatch Cullen Park	11,000
Cavan	1947–48	2023 (Division 3)	Division 2 – 6th	Division 2	Cavan	Breffni Park	25,030
Clare	–	2016 (Division 3)	Division 3 – 6th	Division 3	Ennis	Páirc Chíosóg	19,000
Cork	2012	2020 (Division 3)	Division 2 – 2nd (Runners-Up)	Division 1	Cork	Páirc Uí Chaoimh	45,300
Derry	2024	2024 (Division 1)	Division 2 – 4th	Division 2	Derry	Celtic Park	18,500
Donegal	2026	2026 (Division 1)	Division 1 – 1st (Champions)	Division 1	Ballybofey	MacCumhaill Park	18,000
Down	1982–83	2026 (Division 3)	Division 3 – 1st (Champions)	Division 2	Newry	Páirc Esler	20,000
Dublin	2021	2023 (Division 2)	Division 1 – 7th	Division 2	Dublin	Croke Park	82,300
Fermanagh	–	–	Division 3 – 8th	Division 4	Enniskillen	Brewster Park	20,000
Galway	1980–81	2017 (Division 2)	Division 1 – 5th	Division 1	Galway	Pearse Stadium	26,197
Kerry	2025	2025 (Division 1)	Division 1 – 2nd (Runners-Up)	Division 1	Killarney	Fitzgerald Stadium	38,000
Kildare	–	2021 (Division 2)	Division 2 – 7th	Division 3	Newbridge	St Conleth's Park	15,000
Laois	1985–86	2024 (Division 4)	Division 3 – 4th	Division 3	Portlaoise	O'Moore Park	22,000
Leitrim	–	–	Division 4 – 7th	Division 4	Carrick-on-Shannon	Páirc Seán Mac Diarmada	9,331
Limerick	–	2025 (Division 4)	Division 3 – 7th	Division 4	Rathkeale	Mick Neville Park	2,000
London	–	–	Division 4 – 6th	Division 4	South Ruislip	McGovern Park	3,000
Longford	1965–66	2012 (Division 3)	Division 4 – 2nd (Runners-Up)	Division 3	Longford	Pearse Park	10,000
Louth	–	2022 (Division 3)	Division 2 – 3rd	Division 2	Dundalk	Edward Goodman Park	5,000
Mayo	2023	2023 (Division 1)	Division 1 – 3rd	Division 1	Castlebar	MacHale Park	28,000
Meath	1993–94	2026 (Division 2)	Division 2 – 1st (Champions)	Division 1	Dublin	Croke Park (Note: Meath's main county grounds, Páirc Tailteann, is under redevelopment, so they are playing their home games at Croke Park.)	82,300
Monaghan	1984–85	2025 (Division 2)	Division 1 – 8th	Division 2	Clones	St Tiernach's Park	29,000
Offaly	1997–98	2025 (Division 3)	Division 2 – 8th	Division 3	Tullamore	O'Connor Park	18,000
Roscommon	1978–79	2022 (Division 2)	Division 1 – 4th	Division 1	Roscommon	Dr Hyde Park	18,890
Sligo	–	2023 (Division 4)	Division 3 – 5th	Division 3	Sligo	Markievicz Park	18,558
Tipperary	–	2017 (Division 3)	Division 4 – 5th	Division 4	Thurles	Semple Stadium	45,690
Tyrone	2003	2016 (Division 2)	Division 2 – 5th	Division 2	Omagh	Healy Park	17,636
Waterford	–	–	Division 4 – 8th	Division 4	Dungarvan	Fraher Field	15,000
Westmeath	–	2024 (Division 3)	Division 3 – 3rd	Division 3	Mullingar	Cusack Park	11,000
Wexford	–	2008 (Division 3)	Division 3 – 2nd (Runners-Up)	Division 2	Wexford	Chadwicks Wexford Park	18,000
Wicklow	–	2012 (Division 4)	Division 4 – 3rd	Division 4	Aughrim	Echelon Park	7,000

== Division 1 ==
Locations of the 2027 NFL Division 1 teams

=== Table ===
Pos	Team	Pld	W	D	L	PF	PA	PD	Pts	Qualification
1	Armagh	0	0	0	0	0	0	0	0	Advance to NFL Final
2	Cork	0	0	0	0	0	0	0	0	Advance to NFL Final
3	Donegal	0	0	0	0	0	0	0	0	
4	Galway	0	0	0	0	0	0	0	0	
5	Kerry	0	0	0	0	0	0	0	0	
6	Mayo	0	0	0	0	0	0	0	0	
7	Meath	0	0	0	0	0	0	0	0	Relegation to 2028 NFL Division 2
8	Roscommon	0	0	0	0	0	0	0	0	Relegation to 2028 NFL Division 2

Source: GAA.ie
Rules for classification: Tiebreakers

==== Round 1 ====
23/24 January 2027 Round 1	Armagh	v	Roscommon	Armagh
				Venue: Athletic Grounds

23/24 January 2027 Round 1	Cork	v	Meath	Cork
				Venue: Páirc Uí Chaoimh

23/24 January 2027 Round 1	Galway	v	Kerry	Galway
				Venue: Pearse Stadium

23/24 January 2027 Round 1	Mayo	v	Donegal	Castlebar
				Venue: MacHale Park

==== Round 2 ====
30/31 January 2027 Round 2	Donegal	v	Cork	Ballybofey
				Venue: MacCumhaill Park

30/31 January 2027 Round 2	Kerry	v	Armagh	Tralee
				Venue: Austin Stack Park

30/31 January 2027 Round 2	Meath	v	Galway	Dublin
				Venue: Croke Park

30/31 January 2027 Round 2	Roscommon	v	Mayo	Roscommon
				Venue: Dr Hyde Park

==== Round 3 ====
13/14 February 2027 Round 3	Armagh	v	Cork	Armagh
				Venue: Athletic Grounds

13/14 February 2027 Round 3	Donegal	v	Meath	Ballybofey
				Venue: MacCumhaill Park

13/14 February 2027 Round 3	Mayo	v	Galway	Castlebar
				Venue: MacHale Park

13/14 February 2027 Round 3	Roscommon	v	Kerry	Roscommon
				Venue: Dr Hyde Park

==== Round 4 ====
20/21 February 2027 Round 4	Galway	v	Armagh	Galway
				Venue: Pearse Stadium

20/21 February 2027 Round 4	Kerry	v	Donegal	Killarney
				Venue: Fitzgerald Stadium

20/21 February 2027 Round 4	Meath	v	Mayo	Dublin
				Venue: Croke Park

20/21 February 2027 Round 4	Cork	v	Roscommon	Cork
				Venue: Páirc Uí Chaoimh

==== Round 5 ====
27/28 February 2027 Round 5	Donegal	v	Armagh	Ballybofey
				Venue: MacCumhaill Park

27/28 February 2027 Round 5	Kerry	v	Meath	Tralee
				Venue: Austin Stack Park

27/28 February 2027 Round 5	Mayo	v	Cork	Castlebar
				Venue: MacHale Park

27/28 February 2027 Round 5	Roscommon	v	Galway	Roscommon
				Venue: Dr Hyde Park

==== Round 6 ====
13/14 March 2027 Round 6	Armagh	v	Mayo	Armagh
				Venue: Athletic Grounds

13/14 March 2027 Round 6	Cork	v	Kerry	Cork
				Venue: Páirc Uí Chaoimh

13/14 March 2027 Round 6	Galway	v	Donegal	Galway
				Venue: Pearse Stadium

13/14 March 2027 Round 6	Meath	v	Roscommon	Dublin
				Venue: Croke Park

==== Round 7 ====
21 March 2027 Round 7	Armagh	v	Meath	Armagh
15:45 GMT (UTC+0)				Venue: Athletic Grounds

21 March 2027 Round 7	Donegal	v	Roscommon	Ballybofey
15:45 GMT (UTC+0)				Venue: MacCumhaill Park

21 March 2027 Round 7	Galway	v	Cork	Galway
15:45 GMT (UTC+0)				Venue: Pearse Stadium

21 March 2027 Round 7	Mayo	v	Kerry	Castlebar
15:45 GMT (UTC+0)				Venue: MacHale Park

=== Final ===
28 March 2027
Final

1st Placed Team	v	2nd Placed Team

Croke Park, Dublin

== Division 2 ==
Locations of the 2027 NFL Division 2 teams

=== Table ===
Pos	Team	Pld	W	D	L	PF	PA	PD	Pts	Qualification
1	Cavan	0	0	0	0	0	0	0	0	Advance to NFL Division 2 Final and promotion to 2028 NFL Division 1
2	Derry	0	0	0	0	0	0	0	0	Advance to NFL Division 2 Final and promotion to 2028 NFL Division 1
3	Down	0	0	0	0	0	0	0	0	
4	Dublin	0	0	0	0	0	0	0	0	
5	Louth	0	0	0	0	0	0	0	0	
6	Monaghan	0	0	0	0	0	0	0	0	
7	Tyrone	0	0	0	0	0	0	0	0	Relegation to 2028 NFL Division 3
8	Wexford	0	0	0	0	0	0	0	0	Relegation to 2028 NFL Division 3

Source: GAA.ie
Rules for classification: Tiebreakers

==== Round 1 ====
23/24 January 2027 Round 1	Cavan	v	Tyrone	Cavan
				Venue: Breffni Park

23/24 January 2027 Round 1	Derry	v	Down	Derry
				Venue: Celtic Park

23/24 January 2027 Round 1	Louth	v	Dublin

23/24 January 2027 Round 1	Monaghan	v	Wexford	Clones
				Venue: St Tiernach's Park

==== Round 2 ====
30/31 January 2027 Round 2	Down	v	Cavan	Newry
				Venue: Páirc Esler

30/31 January 2027 Round 2	Dublin	v	Monaghan	Dublin
				Venue: Croke Park

30/31 January 2027 Round 2	Tyrone	v	Louth	Omagh
				Venue: Healy Park

30/31 January 2027 Round 2	Wexford	v	Derry	Wexford
				Venue: Chadwicks Wexford Park

==== Round 3 ====
13/14 February 2027 Round 3	Cavan	v	Derry	Cavan
				Venue: Breffni Park

13/14 February 2027 Round 3	Dublin	v	Wexford	Dublin
				Venue: Croke Park

13/14 February 2027 Round 3	Louth	v	Down

13/14 February 2027 Round 3	Monaghan	v	Tyrone	Clones
				Venue: St Tiernach's Park

==== Round 4 ====
20/21 February 2027 Round 4	Cavan	v	Monaghan	Cavan
				Venue: Breffni Park

20/21 February 2027 Round 4	Derry	v	Dublin	Derry
				Venue: Celtic Park

20/21 February 2027 Round 4	Down	v	Tyrone	Newry
				Venue: Páirc Esler

20/21 February 2027 Round 4	Louth	v	Wexford

==== Round 5 ====
27/28 February 2027 Round 5	Dublin	v	Cavan	Dublin
				Venue: Croke Park

27/28 February 2027 Round 5	Monaghan	v	Louth	Clones
				Venue: St Tiernach's Park

27/28 February 2027 Round 5	Tyrone	v	Derry	Omagh
				Venue: Healy Park

27/28 February 2027 Round 5	Wexford	v	Down	Wexford
				Venue: Chadwicks Wexford Park

==== Round 6 ====
13/14 March 2027 Round 6	Dublin	v	Down	Dublin
				Venue: Croke Park

13/14 March 2027 Round 6	Louth	v	Cavan

13/14 March 2027 Round 6	Monaghan	v	Derry	Clones
				Venue: St Tiernach's Park

13/14 March 2027 Round 6	Wexford	v	Tyrone	Wexford
				Venue: Chadwicks Wexford Park

==== Round 7 ====
21 March 2027 Round 7	Cavan	v	Wexford	Cavan
13:30 GMT (UTC+0)				Venue: Breffni Park

21 March 2027 Round 7	Derry	v	Louth	Derry
13:30 GMT (UTC+0)				Venue: Celtic Park

21 March 2027 Round 7	Down	v	Monaghan	Newry
13:30 GMT (UTC+0)				Venue: Páirc Esler

21 March 2027 Round 7	Tyrone	v	Dublin	Omagh
13:30 GMT (UTC+0)				Venue: Healy Park

=== Final ===
28 March 2027
Final

1st Placed Team	v	2nd Placed Team

Croke Park, Dublin

== Division 3 ==
=== Table ===
Locations of the 2027 NFL Division 3 teams

Pos	Team	Pld	W	D	L	PF	PA	PD	Pts	Qualification
1	Carlow	0	0	0	0	0	0	0	0	Advance to NFL Division 3 Final and promotion to 2028 NFL Division 2
2	Clare	0	0	0	0	0	0	0	0	Advance to NFL Division 3 Final and promotion to 2028 NFL Division 2
3	Kildare	0	0	0	0	0	0	0	0	
4	Laois	0	0	0	0	0	0	0	0	
5	Longford	0	0	0	0	0	0	0	0	
6	Offaly	0	0	0	0	0	0	0	0	
7	Sligo	0	0	0	0	0	0	0	0	Relegation to 2028 NFL Division 4
8	Westmeath	0	0	0	0	0	0	0	0	Relegation to 2028 NFL Division 4

Source: GAA.ie
Rules for classification: Tiebreakers

=== Final ===
27 March 2027
Final

1st Placed Team	v	2nd Placed Team

Croke Park, Dublin

== Division 4 ==
Locations of the 2027 NFL Division 4 teams (London not shown)

=== Table ===
Pos	Team	Pld	W	D	L	PF	PA	PD	Pts	Qualification
1	Antrim	0	0	0	0	0	0	0	0	Advance to NFL Division 4 Final and promotion to 2028 NFL Division 3
2	Fermanagh	0	0	0	0	0	0	0	0	Advance to NFL Division 4 Final and promotion to 2028 NFL Division 3
3	Leitrim	0	0	0	0	0	0	0	0	
4	Limerick	0	0	0	0	0	0	0	0	
5	London	0	0	0	0	0	0	0	0	
6	Tipperary	0	0	0	0	0	0	0	0	
7	Waterford	0	0	0	0	0	0	0	0	
8	Wicklow	0	0	0	0	0	0	0	0	

Source: GAA.ie
Rules for classification: Tiebreakers

=== Final ===
27 March 2027
Final

1st Placed Team	v	2nd Placed Team

Croke Park, Dublin
