= 2020 McGrath Cup =

Tournament details
- Province: Munster
- Year: 2020

Winners
- Champions: Limerick (7th win)
- Manager: Billy Lee
- Captain: Iain Corbett and Donal O'Sullivan

Runners-up
- Runners-up: Cork
- Manager: Ronan McCarthy
- Captain: Ian Maguire

The 2020 McGrath Cup is inter-county Gaelic football competition in the province of Munster, played by all six county teams. It was won by Limerick, who won their first Cup since 2005.

== Format ==
The teams are drawn into two groups of three teams. Each team plays the other teams in its group once, earning 2 points for a win and 1 for a draw. The two group winners play in the final. If the final is a draw, a penalty shoot-out is used to decide the winner; there is no extra time played.

== Group stage ==
=== Group A ===
Pos	Team	Pld	W	D	L	PF	PA	PD	Pts	Qualification
1	Limerick	2	2	0	0	30	22	+8	4	Advance to final
2	Clare	2	1	0	1	35	30	+5	2	
3	Waterford	2	0	0	2	26	39	−13	0	

Updated to match(es) played on 5 January 2019. Source: Munster GAA

29 December 2019 Round 1	Limerick	0-14 (14) – (12) 2-06	Clare	Rathkeale
14:00 GMT (UTC±0)				Venue: Mick Neville Park
		Report

2 January 2020 Round 2	Waterford	0-10 (10) – (16) 2-10	Limerick	Dungarvan
19:30 GMT (UTC±0)				Venue: Fraher Field
		Report		Referee: Sean Lonergan (Tipperary)

5 January 2020 Round 3	Clare	3-14 (23) – (16) 3-07	Waterford	Milltown Malbay
14:00 GMT (UTC±0)				Venue: Hennessy Memorial Park
		Report

=== Group B ===
Pos	Team	Pld	W	D	L	PF	PA	PD	Pts	Qualification
1	Cork	2	2	0	0	65	29	+36	4	Advance to final
2	Tipperary	2	1	0	1	30	42	−12	2	
3	Kerry	2	0	0	2	29	53	−24	0	

Updated to match(es) played on 5 January 2019. Source: Munster GAA

29 December 2019 Round 1	Kerry	2-09 (15) – (37) 6-19	Cork	Tralee
14:00 GMT (UTC±0)				Venue: Austin Stack Park
		Report		Referee: Derek O’Mahony (Tipperary)

2 January 2020 Round 2	Cork	3-19 (28) – (14) 0-14	Tipperary	Mallow
19:30 GMT (UTC±0)				Venue: Mallow Sports Complex
		Report		Referee: Brendan Griffin (Kerry)

5 January 2020 Round 3	Tipperary	1-13 (16) – (14) 1-11	Kerry	Clonmel
14:00 GMT (UTC±0)				Venue: Clonmel Sportsfield
		Report		Referee: David Murnane (Cork)

=== Final ===
11 January 2020 Final	Limerick	0-20 (20) – (16) 0-16	Cork	Limerick
17:30 GMT (UTC±0)				Venue: Gaelic Grounds
		Report		Referee: Brendan Griffin (Kerry)
