= 2025 Down county football team season =

Down county football team
2025 season
- Manager: Conor Laverty
- Stadium: Páirc Esler, Newry
- NFL D2: 7th (relegated)
- All-Ireland Senior Football Championship: Preliminary Quarter-final
- Ulster SFC: Semi-Final
- McGeough Cup: Winners

The following is a summary of Down county football team's 2025 season.

== Competitions ==
Down competed in the National Football League Division 2, the Ulster Championship and the All-Ireland Senior Football Championship during the 2025 season. On 7 September it was announced that the McKenna Cup would not take place in 2025.

== National Football League Division 2 ==
Official fixtures for the 2025 National League were announced on 5 December 2024.

=== Fixtures ===
Win Draw Loss Postponed/Cancelled

Date	Round	Home	Score	Away	Ground	Ref
Sunday 26 January	Group	Roscommon	3-21 v 1-20	Down	Dr Hyde Park, Roscommon	
Sunday 2 February	Group	Down	1-19 v 2-15	Cork	Páirc Esler, Newry	
Saturday 15 February	Group	Down	1-18 v 0-24	Meath	Páirc Esler, Newry	
Sunday 23 February	Group	Louth	2-17 v 0-22	Down	Gaelic Grounds, Drogheda	
Saturday 1 March	Group	Cavan	1-20 v 1-18	Down	Breffni Park, Cavan	
Saturday 15 March	Group	Down	1-26 v 0-28	Westmeath	Páirc Esler, Newry	
Sunday 23 March	Group	Monaghan	2-17 v 0-24	Down	St Tiernach's Park, Clones	

=== Table ===
Pos	Team	Pld	W	D	L	PF	PA	PD	Pts	Qualification
1	Monaghan	7	5	0	2	193	161	+32	10	Advance to NFL Division 2 Final and promotion to 2026 NFL Division 1
2	Roscommon	7	4	1	2	161	142	+19	9	Advance to NFL Division 2 Final and promotion to 2026 NFL Division 1
3	Meath	7	4	0	3	162	157	+5	8	
4	Cavan	7	4	0	3	153	159	−6	8	
5	Cork	7	4	0	3	151	158	−7	8	
6	Louth (Note: Louth are ranked ahead of Down as they won the head-to-head game between the teams.)	7	3	0	4	143	157	−14	6	
7	Down	7	3	0	4	138	149	−11	6	Relegation to 2026 NFL Division 3
8	Westmeath	7	0	1	6	162	181	−19	1	Relegation to 2026 NFL Division 3

Source: GAA.ie
Rules for classification: Tiebreakers

=== Reports ===
26 January 2025
14:00
Round 1

Roscommon	3-21 - 1-20	Down
Diarmuid Murtagh (0-07), Ciaráin Murtagh (1-02), Enda Smith (1-01), Cian McKeon (1-01), Daire Cregg (0-04), Shane Cunnane (0-02), Ben O’Carroll (0-01), Donie Smith (0-01), Eddie Nolan (0-01), Shane Killoran (0-01)	Report	Pat Havern (0-11), Ryan McEvoy (1-02), James Guinness (0-02), Danny Magill (0-02), Gareth McKibben (0-01), Paddy McCarthy (0-01), Odhran Murdock (0-01)

Dr Hyde Park, Roscommon
Referee: Niall Cullen (Fermanagh)
2 February 2025
14:00
Round 2

Down	1-19 - 2-15	Cork
P Havern (0-08), D Magill (1-01), J Guinness (0-03), O Murdock (0-03), O Savage (0-02), C Doherty (0-01), R Burns (0-01)	Report	M Cronin (0-06), S McDonnell (1-02), C Og Jones (1-00), B O'Driscoll (0-02), R Maguire (0-02), E McSweeney (0-01), S Walsh (0-01), P Doyle (0-01)

Pairc Esler, Newry
Referee: Barry Cassidy (Derry)
15 February 2025
18:00
Round 3

Down	1-18 - 0-24	Meath
P Havern (0-09), O Murdock (1-01), D Guinness (0-03), C Doherty (0-02), M Rooney (0-02), D Magill (0-01)	Report	J Morris (0-08), E Frayne (0-08), R Jones (0-02), B Menton (0-02), B Hogan (0-01), C Caulfield (0-01), S Walsh (0-01), J Flynn (0-01)

Pairc Esler, Newry
Referee: Sean Lonergan (Tipperary)
23 February 2025
14:00
Round 4

Louth	2-17 - 0-22	Down
Sam Mulroy (0-10), Ryan Burns (1-02), Kieran McArdle (1-00), Liam Jackson (0-01), Tommy Durnin (0-01), Andy McDonnell (0-01), Ciaran Keenan (0-01), Daire McConnon (0-01)	Report	Pat Havern (0-07), Daniel Guinness (0-04), Danny Magill (0-03), Ceilum Doherty (0-02), Oisín Savage (0-02), Conor McCrickard (0-02), Conor Francis (0-01), Odhran Murdock (0-01)

Gaelic Grounds, Drogheda
Referee: Martin McNally (Monaghan)
1 March 2025
18:00
Round 5

Cavan	1-20 - 1-18	Down
O Brady (0-06), G McKiernan (0-05), P Faulkner (1-00), B Donnelly (0-02), O Kiernan (Castlerahan, 0-02), C Madden (0-02), Ciaran Brady (0-01), Cormac O’Reilly (0-01), G O’Rourke (0-01)	Report	P Havern (0-05), M Rooney (1-01), O Savage (0-03), D Guinness (0-02), D Magill (0-02), J Guinness (0-01), C Doherty (0-01), R McEvoy (0-01), O Murdock (0-01), R Burns (0-01)

Breffni Park, Cavan
Referee: James Molloy (Galway)
15 March 2025
18:00
Round 6

Down	1-26 - 0-28	Westmeath
P Havern 0-14, J McGeough 1-01, S Millar 0-03, A Crimmins 0-02, M Rooney 0-02, O Murdock 0-02, R McEvoy 0-01, D Guinness 0-01	Report	L Loughlin 0-09, R Forde 0-06, B Cooney 0-06, M Whittaker 0-02, R Wallace 0-02, D McCartan 0-02, S McCartan 0-01

Pairc Esler, Newry
Referee: Brendan Cawley (Kildare)
23 March 2025
14:00
Round 7

Monaghan	2-17 - 0-24	Down
Mícheál Bannigan (1-04), Dessie Ward (0-05), Rory Beggan (0-04), David Garland (1-0), Stephen Mooney (0-2), Stephen O’Hanlon (0-01), Conor McCarthy (0-01)	Report	Pat Havern (0-06), Ryan Magill (0-04), Odhrán Murdock (0-03), Danny Magill (0-02), Eugene Branagan (0-2), Ryan McEvoy (0-02), James Guinness (0-01), John McGeough (0-01), Shay Millar (0-01), Caolán Mooney (0-01), Patrick Brooks (0-01)

St Tiernach's Park, Clones
Referee: Barry Tiernan (Dublin)

== Ulster Senior Football Championship ==
The draw for the 2025 Ulster Championship took place in October 2024.

=== Fixtures ===
19 April 2025
16:00
Quarter Final

Fermanagh	0-23 v 2-19	Down
Garvan Jones (0-06), Conor Love (0-04), Sean McNally (0-03), Lee Cullen (0-02), Jonny Cassidy (0-02), Declan McCusker (0-01) Fionan O’Brien (0-01), Darragh McGurn (0-01), Ryan Lyons (0-01), Josh Largo Ellis (0-01), Ronan McCafffey (0-01)	Report	Daniel Guinness (1-03), Ryan McEvoy (1-02), Pat Havern (0-04), Odhran Murdock (0-03), Danny Magill (0-02), Eugene Branagan (0-02), Ceilum Doherty (0-01), Ronan Burns (0-01), Shay Millar (0-01)

Brewster Park, Enniskillen
Attendance: 4,157
Referee: Jerome Henry (Mayo)
27 April 2025
15:00
Semi Final

Donegal	1-19 v 0-16	Down
Patrick McBrearty (1-04), Daire Ó Baoill (0-04), Michael Murphy (0-03), Conor O'Donnell (0-02), Michael Langan (0-02), Shaun Patton (0-01), Ciaran Moore (0-01), Oisin Gallen (0-01), Jamie Brennan (0-01)	Report	Pat Havern (0-08), Eugene Branagan (0-03), Danny Magill (0-02), Miceal Rooney (0-01), Daniel Guinness (0-01), Ryan McEvoy (0-01)

St Tiernach's Park, Clones
Attendance: 9,221
Referee: Joe McQuillan (Cavan)

=== Bracket ===
Preliminary round

Quarter-finals

Semi-finals

Final

Antrim
1-23

Armagh
1-34

Armagh
0-23

Tyrone
0-22

Tyrone
1-24

Cavan
0-20

Armagh
0-28

Donegal
2-23 (a.e.t.)

Fermanagh
0-23

Down
2-19

Down
0-16

Donegal
1-25

Donegal
1-19

Derry
1-15

Monaghan
0-21

Donegal
0-23

== All-Ireland Senior Football Championship ==
Having won the 2024 Tailteann Cup, Down re-entered the All-Ireland Senior Football Championship for the first time in six years. The draw for the 2025 competition was made on 30 April with Down being drawn into Group 3 with Louth, Clare and Monaghan.

=== Group 3 ===
Pos	Team	Pld	W	D	L	PF	PA	PD	Pts	Qualification
1	Monaghan	3	3	0	0	87	68	+19	6	Advance to quarter-final
2	Down	3	2	0	1	90	76	+14	4	Advance to home preliminary quarter-final
3	Louth	3	1	0	2	67	71	−4	2	Advance to preliminary quarter-final
4	Clare	3	0	0	3	58	87	−29	0	

Updated to match(es) played on unknown. Source: GAA

=== Fixtures ===
18 May 2025
14:00
Group Stage

Clare	1-16 - 3-27	Down
Mark McInerney (0-06), Emmet McMahon (0-05), Aaron Griffin (1-01), Dermot Coughlan (0-02), Eoin Cleary (0-01), Jamie Stack (0-01)	Report	Pat Havern (0-09), Danny Magill (0-07), Daniel Guinness (1-01), John McGeough (1-01), Caolan Mooney (1-00), Adam Crimmins (0-03), James Guinness (0-02), Odhran Murdock (0-02), Ryan McEvoy (0-01), Miceal Rooney (0-01)

Cusack Park, Ennis
Attendance: 1,556
Referee: Paddy Neilan (Roscommon)
31 May 2025
17:30
Group Stage

Down	0-25 - 0-24	Louth
P Havern (0-06), D Magill (0-06), O Murdock (0-05), A Crimmins (0-02), C Doherty (0-01); R Magill (0-01), M Rooney (0-01), J McGeough (0-01), C Mooney (0-01), S Millar (0-01)	Report	S Mulroy (0-12), R Burns (0-03), C Lennon (0-03), T Durnin (0-02), C Downey (0-02), C McKeever (0-01), C Grimes (0-01)

Pairc Esler, Newry
Attendance: 10,240
Referee: David Gough (Meath) Sub: N Mooney (Cavan) (20)
15 June 2025
14:00
Group Stage

Monaghan	2-27 - 1-26	Down
R Beggan (0-06), J McCarron (1-03), M Bannigan (1-02), S O'Hanlon (0-03), R O'Toole (0-02), D Ward (0-02), C McCarthy (0-02), A Woods (0-02), M McCarville (0-02), A Carey (0-01), D Garland (0-01), L Kelly (0-01)	Report	P Havern (0-12), D Magill (0-04), J McGeough (1-00), O Murdock (0-02), A Crimmins (0-02), D Guinness (0-02), C McCrickard (0-02), E Brannigan (0-01), C Doherty (0-01)

Athletic Grounds, Armagh
Referee: David Coldrick (Meath)
22 June 2025
13:45
Preliminary Quarter-final

Down	3-21 - 2-26	Galway
O Murdock (1-02), D Guinness (0-04), J McGeough (1-01), R Magill (1-00), M Rooney (0-02), C Mooney (0-02), D Magill (0-02), R McEvoy (0-02), P Havern (0-02), C Doherty (0-01), E Brannigan (0-01), J Guinness (0-01), A Crimmins (0-01)	Report	S Walsh (1-07), R Finnerty (0-06), M Thompson (0-05), T Culhane (1-00), M Tierney (0-02), C McDaid (0-02), D O'Flaherty (0-02), P Cooke (0-01), C D'Arcy (0-01)

Pairc Esler, Newry
Attendance: 14,435
Referee: Derek O'Mahoney (Tipperary)

=== Bracket ===
Preliminary Quarter-Finals
Donegal	2-22
Louth	0-12
Down	3-21
Galway	2-26
Kerry	3-20
Cavan	1-17
Dublin	1-19
Cork	1-16

Quarter-Finals
Monaghan	1-20
Donegal	1-26
Meath	2-16
Galway	2-15
Armagh	1-21
Kerry	0-32
Tyrone	0-23
Dublin	0-16

Semi-Finals
Donegal	3-26
Meath	0-15
Kerry	1-20
Tyrone	0-17

Final
Donegal	0-19
Kerry	1-26

== McGeough Cup ==
On New Year's Eve Down competed in the 2025 against Louth. Down won the game by six points to pick up the McGeough Cup trophy.

=== Fixtures ===
31 December 2025
14:00
Final

Louth	0-13 v 1-16	Down
	Report

MacCumhaill Park, Ballybofey
