= Maurice Shanley =

Irish Gaelic footballer (born 1999)

Personal information
- Native name: Muiris Mac Seanlaoich (Irish)
- Born: 14 September 1999 (age 27) Clonakilty, County Cork, Ireland
- Occupation: Secondary school teacher

Sport
- Sport: Gaelic Football
- Position: Corner-back
Club
- Years: Club
- 2018-present: Clonakilty
Club titles
- Cork titles: 0
Inter-county*
Years	County	Apps (scores)
2019-present	Cork	51 (1-00)
Inter-county titles
- Munster titles: 0
- All-Irelands: 0
- NFL: 0
- All Stars: 0
- *Inter County team apps and scores correct as of 10:27, 8 March 2026.

Maurice Shanley (born 14 September 1999) is an Irish Gaelic footballer who plays for Premier Senior Championship club Clonakilty and at inter-county level with the Cork senior football team. He usually lines out as a corner-back. Maurice made his 50th appearance for the Cork senior football team on the 22nd of February 2026 in a win against Meath.

== Playing career ==
=== Cork ===
Shanley first lined out for Cork when he was drafted onto the Cork under-20 team for the 2018 Munster Under-20 Championship. He made his first appearance for the team on 16 June 2018 when he played at midfield in the 1–20 to 0–08 defeat of Tipperary. He was switched to right wing-forward for the subsequent 3–11 to 0–14 defeat by Kerry in the Munster final.

Once again eligible for the under-20 the following year, Shanley won a Munster Under-20 Championship medal on 18 July 2019 after being selected at full-back in the 3–16 to 0–12 defeat of Kerry in the final. He was again selected at full-back when Cork defeated Dublin by 3–16 to 1–14 to claim the All-Ireland Under-20 Championship.

Shanley was drafted onto the Cork senior team for the 2020 McGrath Cup. He made his National League debut on 1 March 2020 when he was selected at full-back in a 3–13 to 3–11 win over Derry.

== Career statistics ==
As of match played 8 November 2020.

Team	Year	National League			Munster		All-Ireland		Total	
Team	Year	Division	Apps	Score	Apps	Score	Apps	Score	Apps	Score
Cork	2020	Division 3	1	0-00	1	0-00	0	0-00	2	0-00
Career total			1	0-00	1	0-00	0	0-00	2	0-00

== Honours ==
Cork

- National Football League Division 3 (1): 2020
- All-Ireland Under-20 Football Championship (1): 2019
- Munster Under-20 Football Championship (1): 2019
