= Frankie Donnelly =

Irish Gaelic footballer

Personal information
- Born: 1937 Tyrone, Northern Ireland
- Died: 14 March 2007 (aged 69–70)

Sport
- Sport: Gaelic football
- Position: Full Forward
Club
- Years: Club
- 1947–1971: Carrickmore
Club titles
- Tyrone titles: 4
- Ulster titles: 0
Inter-county
- Years: County
- ?–?: Tyrone
Inter-county titles
- Ulster titles: 2
- All-Irelands: 0
- NFL: 0
- All Stars: n/a

Frankie Donnelly was a Gaelic footballer, who was part of Tyrone's breakthrough era in the mid-fifties, claiming two Ulster Championships in a row, with Donnelly being Ulster's top scorer in both those years. His prolific scoring has passed into legend, and holds the record for the highest individual scoring tally in an inter-county match, with 4–11 against Fermanagh in the 1957 Dr Lagan Cup. James Naughton of Limerick broke Donnelly's record when he scored 4–12 against Waterford at Mick Neville Park in the 2025 National Football League.

His contribution to his club, Carrickmore St Colmcille's, is also gargantuan, having played for them for twenty four years, during which time they secured four Tyrone Senior Football Championship titles.

His name is now mentioned in the same light as more recent Tyrone players who have won All Star Awards (Donnelly played before the All Star merits were inaugurated), such as Peter Canavan, and Frank McGuigan.

He died on 14 March 2007, leaving behind a wife and four children.
