= Limerick county football team =

Gaelic football team

Limerick
- Sport: Football
- Irish: Luimneach
- Nickname(s): The Shannonsiders; The Treaty County
- County board: Limerick GAA
- Manager: Jimmy Lee
- Captain: Cillian Fahy
- Home venue(s): Mick Neville Park, Rathkeale

Recent competitive record
- Current All-Ireland status: Munster (QF) in 2025
- Last championship title: 1896
- Current NFL Division: 4 (2nd in 2025; promoted to Division 3)
- Last league title: None
First colours	Second colours

The Limerick county football team represents Limerick in men's Gaelic football and is governed by Limerick GAA, the county board of the Gaelic Athletic Association. The team competes in the three major annual inter-county competitions; the All-Ireland Senior Football Championship, the Munster Senior Football Championship and the National Football League.

Limerick's home ground is Mick Neville Park, Rathkeale. The team's manager is Jimmy Lee.

Limerick was the first Munster county to win an All-Ireland Senior Football Championship (SFC). It has won two All-Ireland Senior Championships. The county last won the Munster Senior Championship and the All-Ireland Senior Championship in 1896. Limerick have never won the National League.

== History ==
Limerick won the first All-Ireland Senior Football Championship (SFC) in 1887 and repeated this success in 1896, when it became the first non-Leinster team to beat the then all-conquering Dublin in a championship match.

The team did not play in the Munster Football Championship (1941-1942) due to Foot and Mouth in 1941 (1949-1950) & (1953–1964).

Limerick plays in Division 4 of the National Football League.

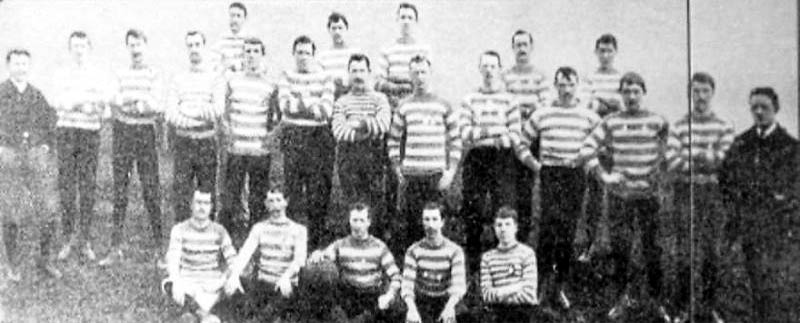
1887 All Ireland SFC-winning Limerick county football team

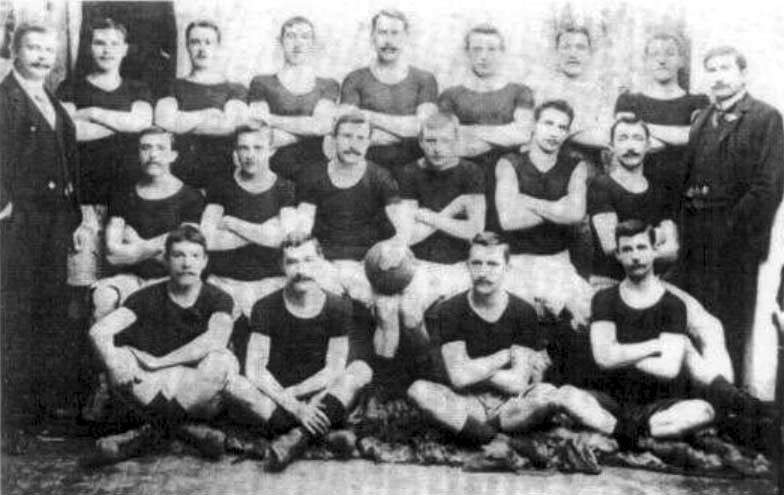
1896 All Ireland-winning Limerick county football team

== Panel ==
Team as per Limerick vs Kildare in the Tailteann Cup final, 12 July 2025 Based on: Note that Emmet Rigter, Danny Neville and Cillian Fahy's positions differ slightly in the team announcement from the Limerick Leader and the match report, which follows the RTÉ broadcast numbers. All numbers confirmed by live coverage of The Sunday Game, except 22 (Diarmuid Buckley of Father Casey's, in the Limerick Leader) is A Masterson on RTÉ (see 0:08:18 here).

No.	Player	Position	Club
1	Josh Ryan	Goalkeeper	Oola
2	Jason Hassett	Right corner-back	Mungret St Paul's
3	Darren O'Doherty	Full-back	Newcastle West
4	Mark McCarthy	Left corner-back	Father Casey's
5	Killian Ryan	Right half-back	Mungret St Paul's
6	Iain Corbett	Centre-back	Newcastle West
7	Tony McCarthy	Left half-back	Kildimo-Pallaskenry
8	Tommie Childs	Midfield	Galtee Gaels
9	Darragh O'Hagan	Midfield	Mungret St Paul's
10	Paul Maher	Right half-forward	Adare
11	Cillian Fahy (c)	Centre-forward	Dromcollogher–Broadford
12	Danny Neville	Left half-forward	Askeaton/Ballysteen/Kilcornan
13	Emmet Rigter	Right corner-forward	Newcastle West
14	James Naughton	Full-forward	St Senan's
15	Peter Nash	Left corner-forward	Kildimo-Pallaskenry

No.	Player	Position	Club
16	Jeffrey Alfred	Substitute	Adare
17	Cormac Woulfe	Substitute	St Senan's
18	Tadgh O'Siochru	Substitute	Monaleen
19	Conall O'Duinn	Substitute	Monaleen
20	Barry Coleman	Substitute	Rathkeale
21	Sean Clancy	Substitute	Galtee Gaels
22	A. Masterson	Substitute
23	Darragh Murray	Substitute	Monaleen
24	Rory O'Brien	Substitute	Father Casey's
25	Andrew Meade	Substitute	Rathkeale
26	Rob Childs	Substitute	Galtee Gaels

^{INJ} Player has had an injury which has affected recent involvement with the county team.
^{RET} Player has since retired from the county team.
^{WD} Player has since withdrawn from the county team due to a non-injury issue.

== Management team ==
Appointed August 2023:

- Manager: Jimmy Lee
- Head coach: Micheál Cahill
- Performance co-ordinator: Adrian O'Brien
- Strength and conditioning coach: Dylan Kenny

== Managerial history ==
Dates	Name	Origin	Provincial titles	National titles
1979–1981	Des McDonnell	Monaleen		
1982–1983	Donie Nestor	Askeaton		
1984–1987	Raymond O'Hagan	Mungret St Paul's		
1987–1988	Paddy O'Dwyer	Claughaun		
1988–1993	P. J. Bourke	Oola		
1993–1994	Ger Power			
1995–1997	David Quirke	Oola		
1997–1999	Paddy Mulvihill			
1999–2005	Liam Kearns		2004 McGrath Cup; 2005 McGrath Cup	
2005–2010	Mickey 'Ned' O'Sullivan		—N/a	2010 NFL Division 4
2010–2013	Maurice Horan	Na Piarsaigh	—N/a	2013 NFL Division 4
2013–2016	John Brudair	Dromcollogher–Broadford	—N/a	—N/a
2017–2022	Billy Lee	Newcastle West	2020 McGrath Cup	2020 NFL Division 4
2022–2023	Ray Dempsey		—N/a	—N/a
2023	Mark Fitzgerald		—N/a	—N/a
2023–	Jimmy Lee	Newcastle West		2025 NFL Division 4

== Players ==
=== Notable players ===
- Seanie Buckley: defender, captained Limerick to the 2010 NFL Division 4 and 2013 NFL Division 4 titles 13 seasons and 40 championship appearances for Limerick (Dromcollogher–Broadford)
- Brian Fanning: full-back who played between 2016 and 2021, winning the 2020 McGrath Cup and 2020 NFL Division 4 title (Pallasgreen)
- Jamie Lee, who went to New South Wales in February 2020
- Johnny McCarthy: 2009 All Star nominee midfield or attack; from the St Kieran's club, McCarthy played 14 seasons for Limericks, including 46 championship appearances, among them the 2004, 2009 and 2010 Munster SFC finals
- Seamus O'Carroll: of Castleknock (Dublin)
- Seán O'Dea, of Kilteely–Dromkeen, who played 16 seasons for Limerick
- Donal O'Sullivan, of Monaleen, who was Limerick's joint captain and goalkeeper when he retired after the 2023 season, a doctor
- Josh Ryan, a forward with Oola, later turned goalkeeper (see 2025 Tailteann Cup final)

=== Records ===
- James Naughton scored 4–12 against Waterford at Mick Neville Park in the 2025 National Football League, one point more than the previous record for highest individual score in a single inter-county match, set by Frankie Donnelly of Tyrone against Fermanagh in the 1957 Dr Lagan Cup.

=== All Stars ===
Limerick has no All Stars.

== Honours ==
=== National ===
- All-Ireland Senior Football Championship
  - (gold) Winners (2): 1887, 1896
- Tailteann Cup
  - (silver) Runners-up (1): 2025
- National Football League Division 4
  - (gold) Winners (4): 2010, 2013, 2020, 2025
- Dr Croke Cup
  - (gold) Winners (1): 1897

=== Provincial ===
- Munster Senior Football Championship
  - (gold) Winners (1): 1896
  - (silver) Runners-up (13): 1888, 1895, 1901, 1905, 1922, 1934, 1965, 1991, 2003, 2004, 2009, 2010, 2022
- Munster Junior Football Championship
  - (gold) Winners (4): 1916, 1929, 1939, 1950
- Munster Under-21 Football Championship
  - (gold) Winners (1): 2000
  - (silver) Runners-up (3): 1984, 2001, 2005
- Munster Minor Football Championship
  - (gold) Winners (1): 1956
  - (silver) Runners-up (4): 1950, 1997, 1998, 2021
- McGrath Cup
  - (gold) Winners (7): 1985, 1987, 1991, 2001, 2004, 2005, 2020
  - (silver) Runners-up (3): 2007, 2008, 2017, 2023
