= 2025 National Football League (Ireland) =

2025 Gaelic football competition in Ireland and London

League details
- Dates: 25 January – 30 March, 2025
- Teams: 32

League champions
- Winners: Kerry (24th win)
- Captain: Gavin White
- Manager: Jack O'Connor

League runners-up
- Runners-up: Mayo
- Captain: Stephen Coen
- Manager: Kevin McStay

Other division winners
- Division 2: Monaghan
- Division 3: Offaly
- Division 4: Limerick

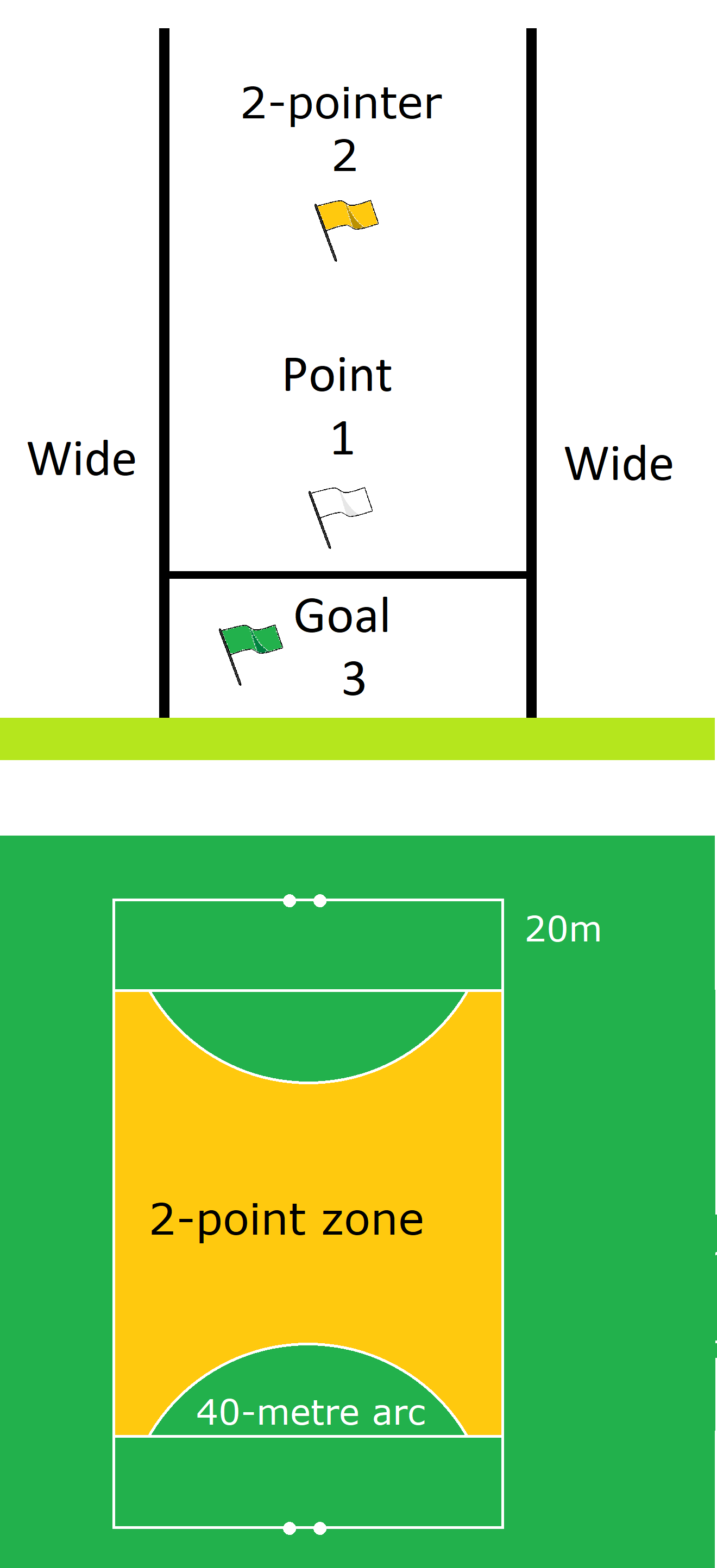
The new scoring system in Gaelic football — when the ball is kicked over the crossbar from outside the 20 m (22 yd) line and outside a 40 m (44 yd) arc, 2 points are scored.

The 2025 National Football League, known for sponsorship reasons as the Allianz Football League, was the 94th staging of the National Football League (NFL), an annual Gaelic football tournament for county teams. Thirty-one county teams from Ireland, plus London, compete; New York do not participate in the National League, though they take part in the All-Ireland Senior Football Championship. Kilkenny do not compete in senior football. 491,565 attended league matches during the 2025 season.

This was the first inter-county competition to feature the new Football Review Committee (FRC) rule changes adopted in 2024, including the two-point shot for scoring outside the 40-metre arc.

Kerry were the winners, becoming the first team to win the Corn Mhichíl Uí Mhuircheartaigh, named for Mícheál Ó Muircheartaigh.

== Format ==
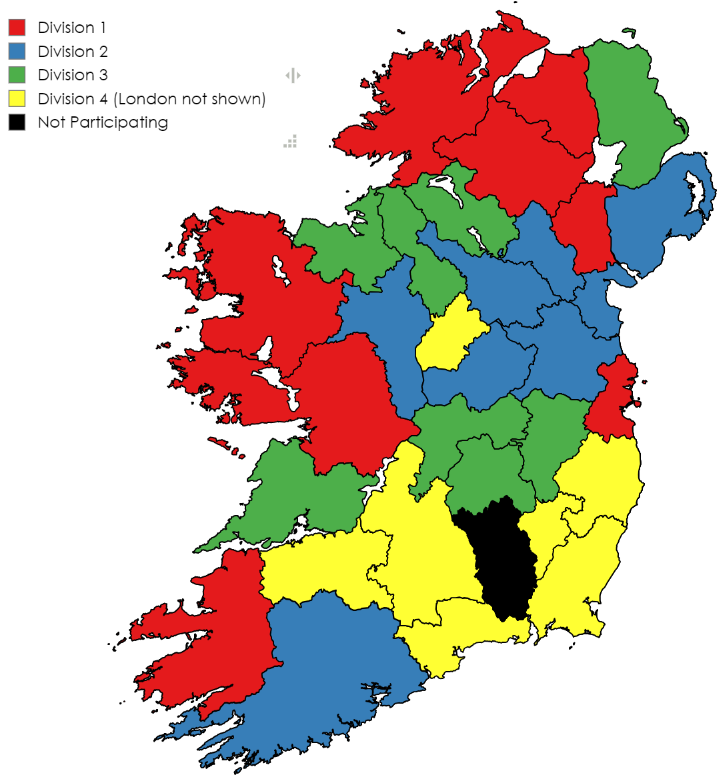
Map showing the leagues in which each county participated

=== League structure ===
Teams by province and division
Province	Division 1	Division 2	Division 3	Division 4	Total
Connacht	2	1	2	0	5
Leinster	1	3	3	4	11
Munster	1	1	1	3	6
Ulster	4	3	2	0	9
England	0	0	0	1	1
Total	8	8	8	8	32

The 2025 National Football League consists of four divisions of eight teams. Each team plays every other team in its division once. Two points are awarded for a win, one point is awarded for a draw and none are awarded for a loss.

In the top division, Division 1, teams compete to become the National Football League (NFL) champions. The top two teams qualify for the NFL Final, with the winners crowned NFL champions.

Teams compete for promotion and relegation to a higher or lower league. In Divisions 2, 3 and 4, the first and second-places teams are promoted and play in the respective divisional finals, while the bottom two teams of divisions 1, 2 and 3 are relegated.

=== Tiebreakers for league ranking ===
As per the Official GAA Guide - Part 1 - Section 6.21:

If two teams in the same group are equal on points on completion of the league phase, the following tie-breaking criteria are applied:

1. Where two teams only are involved - the outcome of the meeting of the two teams in the previous game in the competition;

If three or more teams in the same group are equal on points on completion of the league phase, the following tie-breaking criteria are applied:

1. Scoring difference (subtracting the total scores against from total scores for);
2. Highest total score for;
3. A play-off.

In the event that two teams or more finish with equal points, but have been affected by a disqualification, loss of game on a proven objection, retirement or walkover, the tie shall be decided by the following means:

1. Score difference from the games in which only the teams involved (teams tied on points), have played each other. (subtracting the total scores against from total scores for)
2. Highest total score for, in which only the teams involved, have played each other, and have finished equal in (i)
3. A play-off.

== Division 1 ==
Locations of the 2025 NFL Division 1 teams

=== Table ===
Pos	Team	Pld	W	D	L	PF	PA	PD	Pts	Qualification
1	Mayo	7	4	1	2	133	134	−1	9	Advance to NFL Final
2	Kerry (Note: Ranked by score difference)	7	4	0	3	170	151	+19	8	Advance to NFL Final
3	Galway	7	3	2	2	143	134	+9	8	
4	Donegal	7	4	0	3	141	139	+2	8	
5	Dublin	7	4	0	3	143	142	+1	8	
6	Armagh (Note: Armagh are ranked ahead of Tyrone as they won the head-to-head game between the teams.)	7	3	1	3	144	137	+7	7	
7	Tyrone	7	3	1	3	138	131	+7	7	Relegation to 2026 NFL Division 2
8	Derry	7	0	1	6	136	180	−44	1	Relegation to 2026 NFL Division 2

Source: GAA.ie
Rules for classification: Tiebreakers

=== Matches ===
==== Round 1 ====
25 January 2025 Round 1	Galway	1-12 (15) – (9) 0-9	Armagh	Galway
17:15 IST (UTC+1)		(HT: 1-4 - 0-5)		Venue: Pearse Stadium
	Gls: M Tierney 1 (pen); Pts: C O' Curraoin 0-5 (3f, 1 tp), P Conroy 0-2 (1 tp), S Walsh 0-2 (1 tp), D O' Flaherty 0-1, M Tierney 0-1, F O' Laoi 0-1	Report	Pts: O Conaty 0-4, R Grugan 0-4 (0-3 f), C Turbitt 0-1 (f)	Referee: Conor Lane (Cork)

25 January 2025 Round 1	Tyrone	2-13 (19) – (12) 1-9	Derry	Omagh
18:00 IST (UTC+1)		(HT: 1-7 - 0-6)		Venue: Healy Park
	Gls: P Teague 1, M McKernan 1 Pts: D McCurry 0-3 (1 tp), M McKernan 0-2, M Donnelly 0-2 (1f), E McElholm 0-2, N Devlin 0-1, S O'Hare 0-1, B Kennedy 0-1, R Cassidy 0-1	Report	Gls: C Glass 1 Pts: S McGuigan 0-4 (2f), B Rogers 0-2 (1 tp), E Doherty 0-1, C McFaul 0-1, P Cassidy 0-1	Referee: David Coldrick (Meath)

25 January 2025 Round 1	Dublin	1-17 (20) – (18) 1-15	Mayo	Dublin
19:30 IST (UTC+1)		(HT: 1-8 - 1-10)		Venue: Croke Park
	Gls: K Lahiff 1 Pts: S Bugler 0-7, K Lahiff 0-2, C Kilkenny 0-2, G McEnaney 0-2, L Breathnach 0-2, K McGinnis 0-1, C Basquel 0-1	Report	Gls: C Reid 1 Pts: F Boland 0-4 (1 tp), R Donoghue 0-3 (2f), P Towey 0-2, F Irwin 0-2, D Neary 0-2, C Reape 0-1, D McHale 0-1	Referee: Paul Faloon (Down)

Donegal's Round 1 trip to Kerry was one of several league fixtures postponed because of Storm Éowyn.

8 February 2025 Round 1	Kerry	1-18 (21) – (23) 0-23	Donegal	Killarney
14:30 IST (UTC+1)		(HT: 0-7 - 0-11)		Venue: Fitzgerald Stadium
	Gls: D O'Connor 1 Pts: S O'Shea 0-5 (1 tpf, 2f), D Geaney 0-3, C Geaney 0-3 (2f), P Clifford 0-2, T O'Sullivan 0-1, G O'Sullivan 0-1, B D O'Sullivan 0-1, C O Beaglaioch 0-1	Report	Pts: R McHugh 0-5 (1 tp), C O'Donnell 0-3, O Gallen 0-3 (1 tp), P McBrearty 0-3 (1 tpf), C Thompson 0-2, S O'Donnell 0-2, J Brennan 0-2, P Mogan 0-1, E B Gallagher 0-1, C Moore 0-1	Referee: Brendan Cawley (Kildare)

==== Round 2 ====
1 February 2025 Round 2	Armagh	1-23 (26) – (18) 0-18	Tyrone	Armagh
18:00 IST (UTC+1)		(HT: 1-14 - 0-3)		Venue: Athletic Grounds
	Gls: A Murnin 1 Pts: E Rafferty 0-5 (2 tp), C Turbitt 0-4 (1f), A Murnin 0-4 (1 tp), R McQuillan 0-3 (1 tp), A Forker 0-2 (tp), T McCormack 0-1, O Conaty 0-1, D McMullan 0-1, J Hall 0-1, R Grugan 0-1 (f)	Report	Pts: D McCurry 0-6 (2 tpf), M McKernan 0-4 (2 tp), S O'Hare 0-2, S O'Donnell 0-2, B Kennedy 0-1, L Gray 0-1, K McGeary 0-1, E McElholm 0-1	Referee: Joe McQuillan (Cavan)

1 February 2025 Round 2	Donegal	0-20 (20) – (16) 0-16	Dublin	Ballybofey
19:30 IST (UTC+1)		(HT: 0-11 - 0-6)		Venue: MacCumhaill Park
	Pts: D O'Baoill 0-6 (2 tp), O Gallen 0-4 (1f), P McBrearty 0-3 (2f), M Langan 0-2, S O'Donnell 0-2, C Thompson 0-1 (f), P Mogon 0-1, C O'Donnell 0-1	Report	Pts: C Kilkenny 0-3 (1 tp), C Basquel 0-3, K McGinnis 0-2, G McEneaney 0-2, L Breathnach 0-2, S Bugler 0-2, N Scully 0-1, S Lowry 0-1	Referee: Paddy Neilan (Roscommon)

2 February 2025 Round 2	Derry	1-24 (27) – (30) 5-15	Kerry	Derry
12:30 IST (UTC+1)		(HT: 0-13 - 2-5)		Venue: Celtic Park
	Gls: S McGuigan 1 Pts: S McGuigan 0-4 (1f), N Toner 0-4 (2f), B Rogers 0-3 (1 tp), E Doherty 0-2, P Cassidy 0-2, B McCarron 0-2 (tp), D Gilmore 0-2 (1m), C Glass 0-2 (1' 45'), L Murray 0-1, D Baker 0-1	Report	Gls: C Geaney 2, P Geaney 2, D O'Sullivan 1 Pts: S O'Shea 0-5 (2f, 1 tp), C Geaney 0-2, B D O'Sullivan 0-2, D Geaney 0-2 (tp), D O'Sullivan 0-1, S O'Brien 0-1, D O'Connor 0-1	Referee: Martin McNally (Monaghan)

2 February 2025 Round 2	Mayo	0-16 (16) – (26) 0-26	Galway	Castlebar
14:30 IST (UTC+1)		(HT: 0-9 - 0-8)		Venue: MacHale Park
	Pts: P Towey 0-5 (1 tp), D Neary 0-3, R O'Donoghue 0-3 (3f), C Reid 0-2, S Morahan 0-1, D McHugh 0-1, F Irwin 0-1	Report	Pts: S Walsh 0-9 (2 tp, 2 tpf), C O'Curraoin 0-8 (1f, 2tp, 2tpf), P Conroy 0-3, S Kelly 0-2, R Finnerty 0-2 (2f), D McHugh 0-1, C Gleeson (0-1 '45')	Referee: Noel Mooney (Cavan)

==== Round 3 ====
15 February 2025 Round 3	Derry	0-16 (16) – (16) 1-13	Galway	Derry
17:00 IST (UTC+1)		(HT: 0-4 - 1-10)		Venue: Celtic Park
	Pts: S McGuigan 0-8 (1tpf, 3f), P Cassidy 0-3, L Murray 0-3, C Glass 0-1, N McNicholl 0-1	Report	Gls: D McHugh 1 Pts: S Walsh 0-8 (2 tp, 1 tpf, 1f), S O'Neill 0-1, C Darcy 0-1, C O'Curraoin 0-1(f), M Tierney 0-1	Referee: David Gough (Meath)

15 February 2025 Round 3	Kerry	1-15 (18) – (19) 0-19	Dublin	Tralee
19:30 IST (UTC+1)		(HT: 1-12 - 0-4)		Venue: Austin Stack Park
	Gls: P Geaney 1-1 (0-1m), S O’Shea 0-7 (2 2pt, 2f), M Burns 0-2, B O Beaglaoich 0-2 (1 2pt), G O’Sullivan 0-1, C Geaney 0-1, P Clifford 0-1.	Report	Gls: S Bugler 0-4 (1f), L O’Dell 0-4 (2 2pt), Lee Gannon 0-2 (1 2pt), L Breathnach 0-2, G McEneaney 0-2, E O’Donnell 0-1, C Kilkenny 0-3 (1 2pt), T Lahiff 0-1.	Referee: L Devenney (Mayo); Attendance: 11,500; TV: RTÉ 2

16 February 2025 Round 3	Mayo	0-12 (12) – (10) 0-10	Tyrone	Castlebar
13:45 IST (UTC+1)		(HT: 0-4 - 0-5)		Venue: MacHale Park
	Pts: F Iwrin 0-3, J Flynn 0-2 (tp), R O'Donoghue 0-2 (2f), F Boland 0-2, M Ruane 0-1, D Neary 0-1, C McHale 0-1 (1f)	Report	Pts: N Morgan 0-3 (1f), D McCurry 0-2 (2f), B Kennedy 0-1, M Bradley 0-1, E McElholm 0-1, C McShane 0-1 (f)	Referee: Barry Cassidy (Derry)

16 February 2025 Round 3	Donegal	0-21 (21) – (13) 1-10	Armagh	Ballybofey
15:45 IST (UTC+1)		(HT: 0-12 - 1-3)		Venue: MacCumhaill Park
	Pts: P McBrearty 0-6 (1f), M Murphy 0-3 (1f), C O'Donnell 0-2, J Brennan 0-2, O Gallen 0-2 (1f), R McHugh 0-2, C Thompson 0-2, P Morgan 0-1, O Doherty 0-1	Report	Gls: D McMullan 1 Pts: E Rafferty 0-3 (1 tp, 1 '45), A Murnin 0-2 (tp), B Crealey 0-2 (tp), D McMullan 0-1, J Duffy 0-1, C McConville 0-1	Referee: Sam Hurson (Tyrone)

==== Round 4 ====
22 February 2025 Round 4	Armagh	1-17 (20) – (20) 1-17	Mayo	Armagh
17:00 IST (UTC+1)		(HT: 1-10 - 0-5)		Venue: Athletic Grounds
	Gls: Paddy Burns 1 Pts: C Turbitt 0-4 (1f, 1s), R Grugan 0-4 (1f), E Rafferty 0-3 (1tp), R McQuillan 0-2, O Conaty 0-1, A Murnin 0-1, J Duffy 0-1, S Campbell 0-1	Report	Gls: D Neary 1 Pts: R O'Donoghue 0-6 (1 tp, 1f), M Ruane 0-3, P Towey 0-2, J Flynn 0-2, S Coen 0-2, D Neary 0-1, A O'Shea 0-1	Referee: Barry Tiernan (Dublin)

22 February 2025 Round 4	Dublin	3-20 (29) – (18) 2-12	Derry	Dublin
19:30 IST (UTC+1)		(HT: 1-10 - 0-6)		Venue: Croke Park
	Gls: C Tyrrell 1, N Scully 1, L O'Dell 1 Pts: S Bugler 0-6, L Breathnach 0-4, C O'Callaghan 0-4 (1tp), C Murphy 0-2, N Scully 0-2, E Comerford 0-1, B Howard 0-1	Report	Gls: B Rogers 1, C Glass 1 Pts: S McGuigan 0-7 (2tpf, 3f), P Cassidy 0-3 (1tp), D Cassidy 0-1, C McMonagle 0-1	Referee: Noel Mooney (Cavan)

23 February 2025 Round 4	Tyrone	2-13 (19) – (22) 3-13	Kerry	Pomeroy
13:45 IST (UTC+1)		(HT: 1-7 - 0-6)		Venue: Plunkett Park
	Gls: D Canavan 1, M Bradley 1 Pts: D Canavan 0-4 (2f, 1tpf), M McKernan 0-4 (2tp), C Kilpatrick 0-2 (1tpt), D McCurry 0-2 (2f), M Bradley 0-1	Report	Gls: D Clifford 3 Pts: D Clifford 0-3 (2f), P Geaney 0-3 (3f), D Geaney 0-1, P Clifford 0-1, J O'Connor 0-1, D O'Connor 0-1, B O'Beaglaoich 0-1, G O'Sullivan 0-1, D Casey 0-1	Referee: Paddy Neilan (Roscommon)

23 February 2025 Round 4	Galway	0-21 (21) – (14) 0-14	Donegal	Galway
15:45 IST (UTC+1)		(HT: 0-17 - 0-1)		Venue: Pearse Stadium
	Pts: S Walsh 0-11 (3tp, 1tpf), R Finnerty 0-3 (1 tpf), M Tierney 0-2 (tp), C Flaherty 0-2 (tp), D O'Flaherty 0-1, J Maher 0-1, L Silke 0-1	Report	Pts: D O'Baoill 0-6 (2tp), P Mogan 0-2 (tp), C O'Donnell 0-2 (1f), C Thompson 0-2, O Gallen 0-1, S O'Donnell 0-1	Referee: David Coldrick (Meath)

==== Round 5 ====
1 March 2025 Round 5	Mayo	0-21 (21) – (19) 1-16	Kerry	Castlebar
15:00 IST (UTC+1)		(HT: 0-14 - 1-4)		Venue: MacHale Park
	Pts: R O'Donoghue 0-9 (1tpf, 1tps, 3f), M Ruane 0-3, F Irwin 0-2, D MacHale 0-2, S Callinan 0-1, C Reape 0-1, J Carney 0-1, F Boland 0-1	Report	Gls: B O'Beaglaoich 1 Pts: D Clifford 0-6 (1tp, 2f), D Geaney 0-4 (2tp), P Geaney 0-3 (1f), P Clifford 0-1, D O'Connor 0-1, C Geaney 0-1	Referee: Sam Hurson (Tyrone)

1 March 2025 Round 5	Armagh	1-20 (23) – (15) 1-12	Dublin	Armagh
19:35 IST (UTC+1)		(HT: 1-12 - 0-3)		Venue: Athletic Grounds
	Gls: B McCambridge 1 Pts: C Turbitt 0-6 (3f), G McCabe 0-3, R Grugan 0-3 (1f), R McQuillan 0-2, O O'Neill 0-2 (tp), D McMullen 0-1, A Murnin 0-1, T McCormack 0-1, E Rafferty 0-1 (f)	Report	Gls: L O'Dell 1 Pts: C O'Callaghan 0-6 (1tp, 1tpf, 1f), L Breathnach 0-2, B Howard 0-1, K Lahiff 0-1, C Costello 0-1, C Kilkenny 0-1	Referee: Niall Cullen (Fermanagh)

2 March 2025 Round 5	Galway	1-18 (21) – (21) 1-18	Tyrone	Tuam
13:45 IST (UTC+1)		(HT: 0-11 - 1-8)		Venue: Tuam Stadium
	Gls: S Walsh 1 (pen); Pts: S Walsh 0-7 (3tpf), R Finnerty 0-4 (2tpf), C McDaid 0-2, P Conroy 0-2 (tp), J O'Neill 0-2 (1f), C D'Arcy 0-1	Report	Gls: D Canavan 1 Pts: M Bradley 0-7 (1tpf, 1m, 1f), D Canavan 0-5 (2f), M Donnelly 0-3 (1tp), C Kilpatrick 0-1, K McGeary 0-1, D McCurry 0-1	Referee: Brendan Cawley (Kildare)

2 March 2025 Round 5	Donegal	1-22 (25) – (22) 1-19	Derry	Ballyshannon
13:45 IST (UTC+1)		(HT: 0-7 - 0-11)
	Gls: S O'Donnell 1 Pts: C Thompson 0-6 (1tp, 1tpf), D O'Baoill 0-5 (1tp), O Gallen 0-3 (1tp), C O'Donnell 0-3, H McFadden 0-1, S O'Donnell 0-1, R McHugh 0-1, M Murphy 0-1 (f), C Moore 0-1	Report	Gls: C Glass 1 Pts: S McGuigan 0-6 (1tpf, 4f), L Murray 0-6 (1tp), P Cassidy 0-2, C Glass 0-1, E McEvoy 0-1, N Loughlin 0-1, E Doherty 0-1, C Doherty 0-1	Referee: Jerome Henry (Mayo)

==== Round 6 ====
15 March 2025 Round 6	Kerry	2-21 (24) – (17) 0-17	Armagh	Tralee
17:30 IST (UTC+1)		(HT: 2-13 - 0-6)		Venue: Austin Stack Park
	Gls: P Clifford 1 (pen), D Geaney 1 Pts: D Clifford 0-10 (7f), T Brosnan 0-3, P Clifford 0-2, D Geaney 0-1, M Burns 0-1, P Geaney 0-1, S O'Brien 0-1, J O'Connor 0-1, J Foley 0-1	Report	Pts: O O'Neill 0-4 (1f, 1tpf), R Grugan 0-7 (4f), S Campell 0-2, C Turbitt 0-1 (f), A Murnin 0-1, O Conaty 0-1, J Og Burns 0-1	Referee: Conor Lane (Cork)

15 March 2025 Round 6	Dublin	2-19 (25) – (19) 2-13	Galway	Dublin
19:30 IST (UTC+1)		(HT: 1-10 - 0-6)		Venue: Croke Park
	Gls: S Bugler 2 Pts: C Costello 0-5 (2f, 1 '45), L Breathnach 0-4 (1tp), C O'Callaghan 0-4, R McGarry 0-2, N Scully 0-1, K McGinnis 0-1, C Murphy 0-1, L O'Dell 0-1	Report	Gls: D Comer 1, J Maher 1 Pts: D Comer 0-2 (1m), R Finnerty 0-2 (1f), D O'Flaherty 0-2 (tp), M Tierney 0-2 (1m), M Thompson 0-1, D McHugh 0-1, C Darcy 0-1, O Conghaile 0-1, C McDaid 0-1	Referee: Martin McNally (Monaghan)

16 March 2025 Round 6	Derry	1-17 (20) – (25) 2-19	Mayo	Derry
13:30 IST (UTC+1)		(HT: 1-8 - 1-11)		Venue: Celtic Park
	Gls: P McGurk 1 Pts: C Glass 0-8 (3tp), S McGuigan 0-4 (1f), P McGurk 0-1, N Loughlin 0-1, N Toner 0-1, C Doherty 0-1	Report	Gls: F Irwin 1, J Flynn 1 Pts: R O'Donoghue 0-8 (1tpf, 2f), M Ruane 0-6, F Irwin 0-1, A O'Shea 0-1, F Kelly 0-1, C Reid 0-1, E Laughlin 0-1	Referee: Fergal Kelly (Longford)

16 March 2025 Round 6	Donegal	0-19 (19) – (25) 0-25	Tyrone	Letterkenny
15:30 IST (UTC+1)		(HT: 0-7 - 0-12)		Venue: O'Donnell Park
	Pts: M Murphy 0-4 (2f), J Brennan 0-4, C Moore 0-2, Caolon McColgan 0-2 (tp), Odhran Doherty 0-2 (tp), M Curran 0-1, K McGettigan 0-1, F Roarty 0-1, H McFadden 0-1, E McHugh 0-1	Report	Gls: C Glass 1 Pts: N Morgan 0-5 (2tp), D Canavan 0-4 (2f), M Bradley 0-4 (2f), M Donnelly 0-3, C Daly 0-2, P Teague 0-1, M McKernan 0-1, B Kennedy 0-1, K McGeary 0-1, P Harte 0-1, S O'Donnell 0-1	Referee: Paul Faloon (Down)

==== Round 7 ====
23 March 2025 Round 7	Armagh	4-24 (36) – (21) 1-18	Derry	Armagh
15:45 IST (UTC+1)		(HT: 0-12 - 0-8)		Venue: Athletic Grounds
	Gls: B McCambridge 1, D McMullan 1, C Turbitt 1, R McQuillan 1 Pts: C Turbitt 0-4 (1f), S Campbell 0-4, E Rafferty 0-3 (1tp), R Grugan 0-3 (1tp), A Murnin 0-2, R McQuillan 0-2, T McCormack 0-2, P McGrane 0-1, G McCabe 0-1, O Conaty 0-1, D McMullan 0-1	Report	Gls: A Tohill 1 Pts: C Glass 0-6 (2tp, 1 '45), C Doherty 0-3 (1tp), N Toner 0-3 (2f), C Devlin 0-3 (2f), M Bradley 0-1, S McGuigan 0-1, P Cassidy 0-1	Referee: David Gough (Meath)

23 March 2025 Round 7	Tyrone	2-20 (26) – (19) 1-16	Dublin	Omagh
15:45 IST (UTC+1)		(HT: 1-14 - 1-4)		Venue: Healy Park
	Gls: D Canavan 1, M McKernan 1 Pts: D McCurry 0-9 (3f, 1tpf, 1tp), D Canavan 0-3, K McGeary 0-2 (tp), R Canavan 0-2, N Morgan 0-2 (2 '45), P Harte 0-1, M Donnelly 0-1	Report	Gls: C O'Callaghan 1 Pts: C Costello 0-8 (2tpf, 2tp), S Bugler 0-4 (1tp), L O'Dell 0-2 (tp), N Scully 0-2	Referee: David Coldrick (Meath)

23 March 2025 Round 7	Galway	2-19 (25) – (32) 3-23	Kerry	Galway
15:45 IST (UTC+1)		(HT: 1-10 - 2-11)		Venue: Pearse Stadium
	Gls: R Finnerty 1, M Tierney 1 Pts: R Finnerty 0-6 (5f), M Tierney 0-3 (1tpf), K Molloy 0-3 (1tp), P Conroy 0-2 (tp), C McDaid 0-1, F O'Laoi (0-1), C O'Curraoin 0-1 (f), D Comer 0-1	Report	Gls: G White 1, D Geaney 1, D Bourke 1 Pts: P Geaney 0-7 (6f), D Clifford 0-3 (1f), D Geaney 0-2, P Clifford 0-2, D O'Sullivan 0-2, T Brosnan 0-2, C Geaney 0-2, D Casey 0-1, B O'Beaglaoich 0-1, M Burns 0-1, K Spillane 0-1	Referee: Derek O'Mahoney (Tipperary)

23 March 2025 Round 7	Mayo	1-18 (21) – (19) 1-16	Donegal	Castlebar
15:45 IST (UTC+1)		(HT: 1-7 - 0-6)		Venue: MacHale Park
	Gls: J Carney 1 Pts: R O'Donoghue 0-6 (1tp, 1tpf, 1f), F Irwin 0-3, J Carney 0-3, M Ruane 0-3 (1tp), S Coen 0-1, J Flynn 0-1, P Towey 0-1	Report	Gls: E McHugh 1 Pts: D O'Baoill 0-2 (tp), C Thompson 0-2, C O'Donnell 0-2, S O'Donnell 0-2, M Langan 0-2, A Doherty 0-2, G Mulreany 0-1 ('45), F Roarty 0-1, N O'Donnell 0-1, L McGlynn 0-1	Referee: Joe McQuillan (Cavan)

=== Final ===
30 March 2025	Kerry	1-18 (21) – (15) 1-12	Mayo	Dublin
16:00 IST (UTC+1)		(HT: 1-9 - 0-7)		Venue: Croke Park
	Gls: P. Geaney 1 Pts: D. Clifford 8 (4fs), P. Clifford 3 (2 '45'), P. Geaney 2 (1f), J. O’Connor 2, B.D. O’Sullivan 1, T. Brosnan 1, C. Geaney 1	Report	Gls: E. McLaughlin 1 Pts: R. O’Donoghue 5 (1x2pt, 2fs), A. O’Shea 3, F. Irwin 1, J. Carney 1, J. Flynn 1, P. Towey 1	Referee: David Coldrick; TV: TG4

== Division 2 ==
=== Table ===
Pos	Team	Pld	W	D	L	PF	PA	PD	Pts	Qualification
1	Monaghan	7	5	0	2	193	161	+32	10	Advance to NFL Division 2 Final and promotion to 2026 NFL Division 1
2	Roscommon	7	4	1	2	161	142	+19	9	Advance to NFL Division 2 Final and promotion to 2026 NFL Division 1
3	Meath	7	4	0	3	162	157	+5	8	
4	Cavan	7	4	0	3	153	159	−6	8	
5	Cork	7	4	0	3	151	158	−7	8	
6	Louth (Note: Louth are ranked ahead of Down as they won the head-to-head game between the teams.)	7	3	0	4	143	157	−14	6	
7	Down	7	3	0	4	138	149	−11	6	Relegation to 2026 NFL Division 3
8	Westmeath	7	0	1	6	162	181	−19	1	Relegation to 2026 NFL Division 3

Source: GAA.ie
Rules for classification: Tiebreakers

=== Matches ===
==== Round 1 ====
25 January 2025 Round 1	Cork	2-19 (25) – (21) 0-21	Meath	Cork
17:00 IST (UTC+1)		(HT: 0-11 - 0-11)		Venue: Pairc Ui Chaoimh
	Gls: C Og Jones 1, M Taylor 1 Pts: M Cronin 0-7 (5f, 1tpf), B O'Driscoll 0-6 (1tpf, 1f), C Og Jones 0-4, P Walsh 0-1, C O'Mahony 0-1	Report	Pts: M Costello 0-10 (5f, 1tpf), J Morris 0-4, S Walsh 0-2, E Harkin 0-2, B Hogan 0-1, J Flynn 0-1, E Frayne 0-1	Referee: Derek O'Mahoney (Tipperary)

25 January 2025 Round 1	Cavan	0-20 (20) – (28) 2-22	Monaghan	Cavan
18:00 IST (UTC+1)		(HT: 0-12 - 1-10)		Venue: Breffni Park
	Pts: S McEvoy 0-5 (2tpf, 1f), D McVeety 0-4 (1tp), K Clarke 0-2 (tp), O Kiernan 0-2 (tp), C Madden 0-2, L Molloy 0-1 (f), P Faulkner 0-1, J Smith 0-1, TE Donohoe 0-1 (f), G O'Rourke 0-1	Report	Gls: D Garland 1, C McCarthy 1 (pen); Pts: R Beggan 0-6 (1tp, 2tpf), D Garland 0-4 (1tp, 1f), M Bannigan 0-4 (2f), C McCarthy 0-2 (tp), B McBennett 0-2, R McAnespie 0-1, M Hamill 0-1, J McCarron 0-1 (f)	Referee: Liam Devenney (Mayo)

26 January 2025 Round 1	Roscommon	3-21 (30) – (23) 1-20	Down	Roscommon
14:00 IST (UTC+1)		(HT: 2-6 - 1-14)		Venue: Dr. Hyde Park
	Gls: C Murtagh 1, E Smith 1, C McKeon 1 Pts: D Murtagh 0-7 (1tp, 3f), D Cregg 0-4 (2f), C Murtagh 0-2 (tp), S Cunnane 0-2 (tp), E Smith 0-1, C McKeon 0-1, S Killoran 0-1, E Nolan 0-1, B O'Carroll 0-1, D Smith 0-1	Report	Gls: R McEvoy 1 Pts: P Havern 0-11 (3tpf, 1tp, 1f), R McEvoy 0-2 (tp), J McGuinness 0-2 (tp), D Magill 0-2, O Murdock 0-1, G McKibben 0-1	Referee: Niall Cullen (Fermanagh)

26 January 2025 Round 1	Westmeath	0-18 (18) – (20) 1-17	Louth	Mullingar
14:00 IST (UTC+1)		(HT: 0-8 - 0-9)		Venue: Cusack Park
	Pts: L Loughlin 0-12 (2tp, 1tpf, 3f), R Wallace 0-3, R Forde 0-2 (1f), S Smith 0-1	Report	Gls: S Reynolds 1 Pts: S Mulroy 0-5 (1tpf, 2f), C Downey 0-2, A McDonnell 0-2, R Burns 0-2 (tp), P Lynch 0-2, D McConnon 0-2 (1f), C Lennon 0-1, T Durnin 0-1	Referee: Barry Tiernan (Dublin)

==== Round 2 ====
2 February 2025 Round 1	Down	1-19 (22) – (21) 2-15	Cork	Newry
13:00 IST (UTC+1)		(HT: 0-7 - 1-11)		Venue: Pairc Esler
	Gls: D Magill 1 Pts: P Havern 0-8 (1tp, 3tpf), O Murdock 0-3, J McGuinness 0-3 (1tp), O Savage 0-2 (1f), C Doherty 0-1, R Burns 0-1 ('45), D Magill 0-1	Report	Gls: S McDonnell 1, C Og Jones 1 Pts: M Cronin 0-6 (2tpf), S McDonnell 0-2 (tp), B O'Driscoll 0-2 (tp), R Maguire 0-2 (tp), S Walsh 0-1, E McSweeney 0-1, P Doyle 0-1 (f)	Referee: Barry Cassidy (Derry)

2 February 2025 Round 2	Meath	3-21 (30) – (20) 0-20	Cavan	Navan
14:00 IST (UTC+1)		(HT: 1-12 - 0-8)		Venue: Pairc Tailteann
	Gls: R Jones 2, J Morris 1 Pts: E Frayne 0-8 (1tp, 1tpf, 1f, 1m), J Morris 0-4 (1f), B Hogan 0-2 (1tpf), R Kinsella 0-2, B Menton 0-2 (1tp), J Flynn 0-1, E Harkin 0-1, S Walsh 0-1	Report	Pts: D Lovett 0-9 (4f, 1tp, 1tpf), G McKiernan 0-6 (2tpf, 1tp), O Kiernan 0-2 (tp), C Madden 0-2, D McVeety 0-1	Referee: Seamus Mulhare (Laois)

2 February 2025 Round 2	Louth	1-15 (18) – (20) 1-17	Roscommon	Drogheda
14:00 IST (UTC+1)		(HT: 0-5 - 0-10)		Venue: Gaelic Grounds
	Gls: V Leddy 1 Pts: S Mulroy 0-8 (2tpf, 4f), C Downey 0-3 (1tp), A McDonnell 0-1, C Lennon 0-1, K McArdle 0-1, D McDonnell 0-1	Report	Gls: K Doyle 1 Pts: D Murtagh 0-6 (1tpf, 1f), C Murtagh 0-4, D Smith 0-2, D Cregg 0-1 (f), S Cunnane 0-1 (m), E Smith 0-1, B O'Carroll 0-1, C Cox 0-1	Referee: Conor Dourneen (Cavan)

2 February 2025 Round 2	Monaghan	2-29 (35) – (27) 2-21	Westmeath	Clones
14:00 IST (UTC+1)		(HT: 1-15 - 1-9)		Venue: St. Tiernach's Park
	Gls: J McCarron 1, R O'Toole 1 Pts: C McCarthy 0-7, S Mooney 0-6 (1tp, 3f), D Garland 0-5 (1tp, 1f, 1m), R Beggan 0-4 (2tpf), J McCarron 0-2, R McAnespie 0-2, C McNulty 0-1, K Lavelle 0-1, M Hamill 0-1	Report	Gls: R Forde 1, R Wallace 1 Pts: L Loughlin 0-10 (3tp, 2f), S McCartan 0-3 (1tp), R Forde 0-2 (1f), M Whittaker 0-2, B Cooney 0-1, C Dillon 0-1, B Kelly 0-1, E McCabe 0-1	Referee: Kiernan Eannetta (Tyrone)

==== Round 3 ====
15 February 2025 Round 3	Cork	3-18 (27) – (26) 3-17	Westmeath	Cork
17:00 IST (UTC+1)		(HT: 1-10 - 1-9)		Venue: Pairc Ui Chaoimh
	Gls: C Og Jones 3 Pts: C Og Jones 0-4, B O'Driscoll 0-4 (1tp), S McDonnell 0-3 (1tp), C O'Callaghan 0-2, E McSweeney 0-2 (tp), M Cronin 0-2 (1f), C O'Mahony 0-1	Report	Gls: S McCartan 1, R Wallace 1, M Whittaker 1 Pts: D McCartan 0-6 (3tp), S McCartan 0-3 (1tp), L Dolan 0-3, R Wallace 0-1, C Dillon 0-1, L Loughlin 0-1 (f), R Forde 0-1, B Kelly 0-1	Referee: Brendan Griffin (Kerry)

15 February 2025 Round 3	Down	1-18 (21) – (24) 0-24	Meath	Newry
18:00 IST (UTC+1)		(HT: 1-9 - 0-10)		Venue: Pairc Esler
	Gls: R McEvoy 1 Pts: P Havern 0-9 (6f, 1tpf), D McGuiness 0-3 (1tp), C Doherty 0-2, M Rooney 0-2 (tp), D Magill 0-1, O Murdock 0-1	Report	Pts: J Morris 0-9 (5f, 1tp, 1tpf), E Frayne (4f, 1tpf), B Menton 0-2, R Jones 0-2 (tp), S Walsh 0-1, J Flynn 0-1, C Caulfield 0-1, B Hogan 0-1 ('45)	Referee: Sean Lonergan (Tipperary)

16 February 2025 Round 3	Cavan	3-15 (24) – (18) 0-18	Louth	Cavan
14:00 IST (UTC+1)		(HT: 1-7 - 0-12)		Venue: Breffni Park
	Gls: G McKiernan 1, C Madden 1, J McLoughlin 1 Pts: D McVeety 0-4, G McKiernan 0-2 (2f), C Madden 0-2 (tp), J Smith 0-2, P Faulkner 0-1, E Crowe 0-1, G O'Rourke 0-1 ('45), L Fortune 0-1, O Brady 0-1	Report	Pts: S Mulroy 0-6 (3f), R Burns 0-3 (1tp), L Jackson 0-2, T Durnin 0-2 (1tp), A McDonnell 0-2 (1tp), C Downey 0-2, C Murphy 0-1	Referee: Paul Faloon (Down)

16 February 2025 Round 3	Roscommon	0-24 (24) – (20) 2-14	Monaghan	Roscommon
14:00 IST (UTC+1)		(HT: 0-8 - 2-6)		Venue: Dr. Hyde Park
	Pts: D Murtagh 0-12 (2f, 2tpf, 2tp), C Murtagh 0-3, C Hand 0-3, C Cox 0-3 (1tp), D Smith 0-2, R Daly 0-1, S Lambe 0-1	Report	Gls: D Garland 1, M Bannigan 1 Pts: M Bannigan 0-4 (2f), M McCarville 0-2 (1tp), C McCarthy 0-2, D Garland 0-1, S Mooney 0-1, L Kelly 0-1, R O'Toole 0-1, C McNulty 0-1, R Beggan 0-1	Referee: Thomas Murphy (Galway)

==== Round 4 ====
22 February 2025 Round 4	Monaghan	3-16 (25) – (18) 1-15	Cork	Inniskeen
14:30 IST (UTC+1)		(HT: 3-5 - 0-5)		Venue: Grattan Park
	Gls: J McCarron 1 (pen), S O'Hanlon 1, R Wylie 1 Pts: R Beggan 0-7 (3tpf, 1f), J McCarron 0-2 (2f), C McNulty 0-2, S Jones 0-2 (tp), D Garland 0-2, C McCarthy 0-1	Report	Gls: M Cronin 1 (pen); Pts: M Cronin 0-8 (1tp, 1tpf, 4f), C O'Mahony 0-2, C Og Jones 0-2 (1f), P Walsh 0-1, S McDonnell 0-1, C Cahalane 0-1	Referee: Fergal Kelly (Longford)

23 February 2025 Round 4	Westmeath	0-21 (21) – (25) 1-22	Cavan	Mullingar
14:00 IST (UTC+1)		(HT: 0-17 - 0-5)		Venue: Cusack Park
	Pts: D McCartan 0-6 (2tpf, 1f), L Loughlin 0-6 (1tpf, 1tp, 1f), K O'Sullivan 0-2, R Wallace 0-2 (tp), B Cooney 0-1, M Whittaker 0-1, L Dolan 0-1, C Dillon 0-1, B Kelly 0-1	Report	Gls: G Smith 1, Pts: G McKiernan 0-5 (1tpf, 3f), D McVeety 0-4 (2tp), O Brady 0-4 (1tpf, 1f), J Smith 0-3, C Madden 0-2, D Lovett 0-2 (tp), O Kiernan 0-1	Referee: Derek O'Mahoney (Tipperary)

23 February 2025 Round 4	Louth	2-17 (23) – (22) 0-22	Down	Drogheda
14:30 IST (UTC+1)		(HT: 1-8 - 0-13)		Venue: Gaelic Grounds
	Gls: R Burns 1, K McArdle 1 Pts: S Mulroy 0-10 (1tpf, 4f, 1'45), R Burns 0-2 (tp), L Jackson 0-1, T Durnin 0-1, A McDonnell 0-1, C Keenan 0-1, D McConnon 0-1	Report	Pts: P Havern 0-7 (1tp, 3f), D McGuiness 0-4 (1tp), D Magill 0-3 (1tp), C Doherty 0-2 (tp), C McCrickard 0-2, O Savage 0-2 (1f), C Francis 0-1, O Murdock 0-1	Referee: Martin McNally (Monaghan)

23 February 2025 Round 4	Meath	2-18 (24) – (17) 0-17	Roscommon	Navan
14:30 IST (UTC+1)		(HT: 0-8 - 0-12)		Venue: Pairc Tailteann
	Gls: S Coffey 1, R Jones 1 Pts: E Frayne 0-6 (1tpf, 2f), C Duke 0-5 (2tp), J Morris 0-2 (1f), B Hogan 0-2 (2'45), S Walsh 0-1, C Caulfield 0-1, A Lynch 0-1	Report	Pts: D Ruane 0-3 (1tp), C Murtagh 0-3 (1tp, 1f), E Smith 0-3, C Carroll 0-2 (tp), C McKeon 0-2, K Doyle 0-2, C Hand 0-1, C Cox 0-1 (f)	Referee: Joe McQuillan (Cavan)

==== Round 5 ====
1 March 2025 Round 5	Cavan	1-20 (23) – (21) 1-18	Down	Cavan
18:00 IST (UTC+1)		(HT: 0-12 - 1-7)		Venue: Breffni Park
	Gls: P Faulkner 1 Pts: O Brady 0-6 (3f), G McKiernan 0-5 (1f, 1tpf), C Madden 0-2, B Donnelly 0-2, O Kiernan 0-2, C Brady 0-1, G O'Rourke 0-1 ('45), C O'Reilly 0-1	Report	Gls: M Rooney 1 Pts: P Havern 0-5 (2f, 1tp), O Savage 0-3 (3f), D Magill 0-2, D Guinness 0-2, O Murdock 0-1, M Rooney 0-1, R Burns 0-1 ('45), R McEvoy 0-1	Referee: James Molloy (Galway)

1 March 2025 Round 5	Cork	0-13 (13) – (27) 2-21	Roscommon	Cork
19:00 IST (UTC+1)		(HT: 0-8 - 0-12)		Venue: Pairc Ui Chaoimh
	Pts: M Cronin 0-8 (1tp, 1tpf, 3f), C Og Jones 0-1, C O'Callaghan 0-1 (f), C O'Mahony 0-1, P Walsh 0-1, S Powter 0-1	Report	Gls: E Smith 1 (pen), B O'Carroll 1 Pts: D Murtagh 0-7 (2tpf, 2f), C Hand 0-6, B O'Carroll 0-3, S Cunnane 0-1 (m), R Dolan 0-1, U Harney 0-1, C Murtagh 0-1, A Brady 0-1	Referee: Sean Lonergan (Tipperary)

2 March 2025 Round 5	Louth	1-21 (24) – (30) 1-27	Monaghan	Drogheda
14:00 IST (UTC+1)		(HT: 0-7 - 1-19)		Venue: Gaelic Grounds
	Gls: S Mulroy 1 (pen); Pts: S Mulroy 0-12 (5f, 3tpf, 1'45), P Mathews 0-4 (1tp), T Durnin 0-1, C McKeever 0-1, C Grimes 0-1, D McConnon 0-1, R Burns 0-1	Report	Gls: C McCarthy 1 Pts: R Beggan 0-5 (2tpf, 1'45), S O'Hanlon 0-4 (1tp), C McCarthy 0-4 (1tp), A Woods 0-4, M Bannigan 0-3 (m), J McCarron 0-2 (1f), K Duffy 0-2 (tp), D Garland 0-1, R Wylie 0-1, C McNulty 0-1	Referee: Seamus Mulhare (Laois)

2 March 2025 Round 5	Westmeath	1-17 (20) – (23) 3-14	Meath	Mullingar
15:15 IST (UTC+1)		(HT: 0-9 - 2-8)		Venue: Cusack Park
	Gls: K Martin 1 Pts: L Loughlin 0-6 (1tpf, 1f), R Forde 0-3 (2f), M Whittaker 0-2, D McCartan 0-1, B Cooney 0-1, C Dillon 0-1, S McCartan 0-1, L Dolan 0-1, B Kelly 0-1	Report	Gls: C Duke 1, J Morris 1, A O'Neill 1 Pts: E Frayne 0-4 (2f), C Duke 0-3, J Morris 0-3 (1tp), J Flynn 0-3 (1tp), B Menton 0-1	Referee: Barry Judge (Sligo)

==== Round 6 ====
15 March 2025 Round 6	Down	1-26 (29) – (28) 0-28	Westmeath	Newry
18:00 IST (UTC+1)		(HT: 1-10 - 0-14)		Venue: Pairc Esler
	Gls: J McGeough 1 Pts: P Havern 0-13 (3tp, 1tp, 3f), S Millar 0-3, A Crimmins 0-2, M Rooney 0-2, O Murdock 0-2, R McEvoy 0-1, J Guinness 0-1, D Guinness 0-1, J McGeough 0-1	Report	Pts: J Morris 0-9 (5f, 1tp, 1tpf), E Frayne (4f, 1tpf), B Menton 0-2, R Jones 0-2 (tp), S Walsh 0-1, J Flynn 0-1, C Caulfield 0-1, B Hogan 0-1 ('45)	Referee: Sean Lonergan (Tipperary)

16 March 2025 Round 6	Roscommon	0-20 (20) – (22) 0-22	Cavan	Roscommon
14:00 IST (UTC+1)		(HT: 0-11 - 0-9)		Venue: Dr. Hyde Park
	Pts: C Hand 0-4 (1tpf, 1'45), C Cox 0-4 (1tp, 2f), C McKeon 0-3, C Murtagh 0-3 (1f), D Murtagh 0-3 (2f), E Smith 0-2, U Harney 0-1	Report	Pts: G McKiernan 0-6 (4f, 1tpf), C O'Reily 0-4, D McVeety 0-4 (1tp), C Madden 0-3 (2f), S McEvoy 0-3, B Donnelly 0-1, J Smith 0-1	Referee: Sean Hurson (Tyrone)

16 March 2025 Round 6	Cork	1-23 (26) – (18) 0-18	Louth	Cork
14:00 IST (UTC+1)		(HT: 0-15 - 0-4)		Venue: Pairc Ui Chaoimh
	Gls: C O'Callaghan 1 Pts: M Cronin 0-8 (2tpf, 1m, 1f), B O'Driscoll 0-4 (2tp), C Og Jones 0-3, R Maguire 0-2, C O'Mahonys 0-2, C O'Callaghan 0-1, M Taylor 0-1, I Maguire 0-1, B Hurley 0-1 (f)	Report	Pts: S Mulroy 0-11 (4tp, 1tpf, 1f), A McDonnell 0-2, C Downey 0-2 (tp), D McKeown 0-1, S Reynolds 0-1, C Brannigan 0-1	Referee: Thomas Murphy (Galway)

16 March 2025 Round 6	Meath	1-20 (23) – (32) 1-29	Monaghan	Navan
14:00 IST (UTC+1)		(HT: 0-8 - 1-20)		Venue: Pairc Tailteann
	Gls: Eoghan Frayne 1 Pts: Eoghan Frayne 0-6 (3f, 1tpf), J Morris 0-4 (1f), R Kinsella 0-4 (2tp), A Lynch 0-2 (1m), J Kinlough 0-2, J Flynn 0-1, B Menton 0-1	Report	Gls: A Woods 1 Pts: M Bannigan 0-8 (1tp, 2f, 1m), J McCarron (1tpf, 1tp, 2f), S O'Hanlon 0-4, R Beggan 0-4 (2tpf), G Mohan 0-2 (tp), C McCarthy 0-2, R McAnespie 0-1, C McNulty 0-1	Referee: Anthony Nolan (Wicklow)

==== Round 7 ====
23 March 2025 Round 7	Monaghan	2-17 (23) – (24) 0-24	Down	Clones
13:30 IST (UTC+1)		(HT: 1-3 - 0-11)		Venue: St. Tiernach's Park
	Gls: M Bannigan 1, D Garland 1 Pts: D Ward 0-5 (2tp), R Beggan 0-4 (2tp), M Bannigan 0-4 (3f), S Mooney 0-2, S O'Hanlon 0-1, C McCarthy 0-1	Report	Pts: P Havern 0-6 (4f), R Magill 0-4 (1tp), O Murdock 0-3, E Branagan 0-2, D Magill 0-2, R McEvoy 0-2, J McGeough 0-1, C Mooney 0-1, S Millar 0-1, P Brooks 0-1, J Guinness 0-1	Referee: Barry Tiernan (Dublin)

23 March 2025 Round 7	Louth	1-19 (22) – (17) 0-17	Meath	Inniskeen
13:30 IST (UTC+1)		(HT: 1-13 - 0-5)		Venue: Grattan Park
	Gls: K McArdle 1 Pts: R Burns 0-9 (5f, 2tpf), C Branigan 0-4 (2tp), T Durnin 0-3 (1tp), K McArdle 0-1, E Carolan 0-1, P Lynch 0-1	Report	Pts: J Morris 0-8 (1tp, 2f, 1tpf), E Frayne 0-4 (2f, 1tpf), J Flynn 0-2, K Curtis 0-2 (tp), A Lynch 0-1	Referee: Kieran Eannetta (Tyrone)

23 March 2025 Round 7	Westmeath	1-19 (22) – (22) 2-16	Roscommon	Mullingar
13:30 IST (UTC+1)		(HT: 1-5 - 2-10)		Venue: Cusack Park
	Gls: L Loughlin 1 Pts: R Connellan 0-7 (3tp), L Loughlin 0-2 (2'45), B Cooney 0-2, E McCabe 0-2 (tp), K Martin (tp), S McCartan 0-2 (1'45), R Forde 0-1, M Whittaker 0-1	Report	Gls: C Murtagh 1, D Murtagh 1 Pts: C Murtagh 0-6 (2f), D Cregg 0-3, C McKeon 0-3, E Smith 0-2, C Lennon 0-1, C Cox 0-1 (f)	Referee: Jerome Henry (Mayo)

23 March 2025 Round 7	Cavan	0-19 (19) – (21) 0-21	Cork	Cavan
13:30 IST (UTC+1)		(HT: 0-5 - 0-11)		Venue: Breffni Park
	Pts: G McKieran 0-7 (1tp, 1tpf, 3f), D McVeety 0-3 (1tp), S McEvoy 0-3, J Smith 0-2 (tp), C Madden 0-2 (2f), B Donnelly 0-1, C O'Reilly 0-1	Report	Pts: M Cronin 0-5 (2f, 1tp), S McDonnell 0-4, C Og Jones 0-4, B O'Driscoll 0-3 (1tp), C O'Mahony 0-2, B Hurley 0-2, I Maguire 0-1	Referee: Paul Faloon (Down)

=== Final ===
29 March 2025	Monaghan	1-26 (29) – (19) 0-19	Roscommon	Dublin
19:15 IWT (UTC±0)		(HT: 0-11 – 0-12)		Venue: Croke Park
	Gls: Jack McCarron 1 Pts: Rory Beggan 7 (3x2pf, 1 45), Micheal Bannigan 5 (1tp), Andrew Woods 3 (1f), Jack McCarron 2, Dessie Ward 2(tp), Conor McCarthy 2(tp), Ryan McAnespie 1, Ryan Wylie 1, Stephen O'Hanlon 1, Ciaran McNulty 1, Gary Mohan 1	Report	Pts: Diarmuid Murtagh 8 (4f, 1x2tp), Ciarain Murtagh 2fs, Cian McKeon 2, Enda Smith 2, Ben O'Carroll 1, Conor Carroll 1 (45), Eddie Nolan 1, Ruaidhrí Fallon 1, Donie Smith 1	Referee: Barry Tiernan (Dublin); Attendance: 11,450; TV: TG4

== Division 3 ==
=== Table ===
Pos	Team	Pld	W	D	L	PF	PA	PD	Pts	Qualification
1	Kildare (Note: Ranked by score difference)	7	5	0	2	162	103	+59	10	Advance to NFL Division 3 Final and promotion to 2026 NFL Division 2
2	Offaly	7	5	0	2	145	113	+32	10	Advance to NFL Division 3 Final and promotion to 2026 NFL Division 2
3	Clare	7	5	0	2	138	117	+21	10	
4	Fermanagh	7	4	1	2	111	124	−13	9	
5	Sligo	7	3	1	3	136	129	+7	7	
6	Laois	7	3	0	4	146	137	+9	6	
7	Antrim	7	2	0	5	132	148	−16	4	Relegation to 2026 NFL Division 4
8	Leitrim	7	0	0	7	59	158	−99	0	Relegation to 2026 NFL Division 4

Source: GAA.ie
Rules for classification: Tiebreakers

=== Matches ===
==== Round 1 ====
25 January 2025 Round 1	Kildare	2-24 (30) – (15) 1-12	Fermanagh	Newbridge
17:00 IST (UTC+1)		(HT: 0-13 - 0-7)		Venue: St. Conleth's Park
	Gls: R Sinkey 1, D Kirwan 1 Pts: D Kirwan 0-6 (2f), A Beirne 0-4 (2f, 1tpf), N Kelly 0-3 (1tp), R Sinkey 0-2, C Dalton 0-2, C Bolton 0-2, D Hyland 0-2 (tp), M O'Grady 0-1, R Houlihan 0-1, B McLoughlin 0-1	Report	Gls: S McGullion 1 Pts: G Jones 0-3 (2f), D McGurn 0-3 (1tp), R Bogue 0-2 (1'45), D McCusker 0-1, F O'Brien 0-1 (f), C Love 0-1, U Kelm 0-1	Referee: Barry Judge (Sligo)

25 January 2025 Round 1	Antrim	1-9 (12) – (9) 1-6	Clare	Belfast
13:00 IST (UTC+1)		(HT: 1-7 - 1-1)		Venue: Corrigan Park
	Gls: F Nagle 1 Pts: C Hand 0-3 (1tp), C Stewart 0-2, P McBride 0-2 (1f), R Murray 0-1, F Nagle 0-1	Report	Gls: C Downes 1 Pts: E McMahon 0-2 (1f), A Griffin 0-1, B McNamara 0-1, C Murray 0-1, C Downes 0-1	Referee: Kevin Faloon (Armagh)

25 January 2025 Round 1	Offaly	1-17 (20) – (13) 0-13	Sligo	Tullamore
14:00 IST (UTC+1)		(HT: 0-7 - 0-9)		Venue: O'Connor Park
	Gls: R McNamee 1 Pts: K O'Neill 0-6 (1f), D Hyland 0-4 (2f), P Dunican 0-2, C Flynn 0-1, S Tierney 0-1, N Dunne 0-1, R Egan 0-1, R McNamee 0-1	Report	Pts: P O'Connor 0-5 (2f), N Murphy 0-3 (1tp), A McLoughlin 0-2 (1f), A Reilly 0-2, C Lally 0-1	Referee: Chris Maguire (Clare)

Laois's Round 1 trip to Leitrim was one of several league fixtures postponed because of Storm Éowyn.

8 February 2025 Round 1	Leitrim	0-6 (6) – (29) 3-20	Laois	Ballinamore
14:30 IST (UTC+1)		(HT: 0-2 - 3-12)		Venue: Pairc Sean Ui Eslin
	Pts: T Prior 0-2, D Cox 0-2, K Beirne 0-1, K Keegan 0-1	Report	Gls: P Kirwan 1, B Carroll 1, K Swayne 1 Pts: M Barry 0-7 (5f), D Larkin 0-3, P Kirwan 0-2 (tp), J Kelly 0-2, N Corbett 0-2, R Coffey 0-1, C Brown 0-1, S Fingleton 0-1, Jonah Kelly 0-1	Referee: Fergal Kelly (Longford)

==== Round 2 ====
2 February 2025 Round 2	Clare	2-17 (23) – (10) 0-10	Leitrim	Ennis
14:00 IST (UTC+1)		(HT: 0-13 - 0-4)		Venue: Cusack Park
	Gls: I Ugwueru 1, A Sweeney 1 Pts: E Cleary 0-6 (2tp), E McMahon 0-4 (1tp, 1f), A Griffin 0-3, D Walsh 0-1, C Downes 0-1, S McAllister 0-1, K Sexton 0-1	Report	Pts: B McNulty 0-4 (1f), K Beirne 0-3 (1f), R O'Rourke 0-1, J Flynn 0-1, D Cox 0-1	Referee: James Molloy (Galway)

2 February 2025 Round 2	Sligo	0-13 (13) – (19) 1-16	Kildare	Sligo
14:00 IST (UTC+1)		(HT: 0-8 - 0-9)		Venue: Markievicz Park
	Pts: N Murphy 0-4 (2f, 1tpf), D Cummins 0-3, A McLoughlin 0-2, P O'Connor 0-2, A Reilly 0-1, A Devaney 0-1 ('45)	Report	Gls: D Kirwan 1 Pts: D Kirwan 0-5 (1tp), N Kelly 0-2, R Sinkey 0-2, A Beirne 0-2, C Dalton 0-2, D Cordonnier 0-1 ('45), R Houlihan 0-1, D Swords 0-1	Referee: Thomas Murphy (Galway)

2 February 2025 Round 2	Fermanagh	2-16 (22) – (21) 3-12	Antrim	Ederney
14:30 IST (UTC+1)		(HT: 2-3 - 2-6)
	Gls: G Jones 1, C Love 1 Pts: G Jones 0-7 (1tp), D McGurn 0-3, J Cassidy 0-2, F O'Brien 0-2, D McCusker 0-1, C Love 0-1	Report	Gls: D McEnhill 1, F Nagle 1, R McCann 1 Pts: P McBride 0-3 (1f), M Byrne 0-2 (1'45), R Boyle 0-1, C Stewart 0-1, C Hand 0-1, P Finnegan 0-1, D McEnhill 0-1, F Nagle 0-1, R McQuillan 0-1	Referee: Enda McFeely (Donegal)

2 February 2025 Round 2	Laois	1-17 (20) – (25) 2-19	Offaly	Portlaoise
16:00 IST (UTC+1)		(HT: 0-8 - 0-9)		Venue: O'Moore Park
	Gls: D Larkin 1 Pts: M Barry 0-9 (3f, 1tpf, 1tp), R Coffey 0-4, P Kirwan 0-2, K Roche 0-1, K Swayne 0-1	Report	Gls: J Hayes 1, P Dunican 1 Pts: K O'Neill 0-4 (1f), D Hyland 0-4 (1f), S Tierney 0-3, J Bryant 0-2, J Hayes 0-1, R Gallagher 0-1, D Egan 0-1, C Egan 0-1, C Flynn 0-1, C Bourke 0-1	Referee: Jerome Henry (Mayo)

==== Round 3 ====
16 February 2025 Round 3	Laois	0-23 (23) – (16) 0-16	Sligo	Portlaoise
13:00 IST (UTC+1)		(HT: 0-14 - 0-4)		Venue: O'Moore Park
	Pts: M Barry 0-11 (5f), K Roche 0-2 (1f), J Kelly 0-2 (tp), B Dempsey 0-2, B Byrne 0-1, P Kirwan 0-1, K Swayne 0-1, D O'Reilly 0-1, D Larkin 0-1, J Hogan 0-1	Report	Pts: A McLoughlin 0-7 (3tp, 1f), N Murphy 0-6 (2f, 2tpf), C Lally 0-1, E Smith 0-1, R Doherty 0-1	Referee: Anthony Nolan (Wicklow)

16 February 2025 Round 3	Clare	1-17 (20) – (18) 1-15	Fermanagh	Ennis
13:30 IST (UTC+1)		(HT: 1-9 - 1-6)		Venue: Cusack Park
	Gls: A Sweeney 1 Pts: E McMahon 0-10 (1tpf, 2f), E Cleary 0-4 (1tpf, 1f), C Downes 0-2, B McNamara 0-1	Report	Gls: J McDade 1 Pts: G Jones 0-4 (2f), J L Elis 0-3 (1tp), F O'Brien 0-2 (1f), R McCaffrey 0-1, P Breen 0-1, D McGurn 0-1, R Lyons 0-1, C Love 0-1, S Cassidy 0-1	Referee: Christopher Ryan (Galway)

16 February 2025 Round 3	Offaly	4-19 (31) – (15) 0-15	Antrim	Tullamore
14:00 IST (UTC+1)		(HT: 2-8 - 0-12)		Venue: O'Connor Park
	Gls: K O'Neill 2, C Bourke 1, S Tierney 1 Pts: D Hyland 0-7 (1tpf, 1tp, 1f, 1'45), N Dunne 0-3 (1f), J Bryant 0-3 (1m), K O'Neill 0-2 (1f), S Tierney 0-2, J Furlong 0-1, J Hayes 0-1	Report	Pts: D McEnhill 0-4 (3f), C Hand 0-3 (1tp), M Jordon 0-2, P McBride 0-2 (1tp), D McAleese 0-2 (1tp), R McCann 0-1 (m), M Byrne 0-1 ('45)	Referee: David Murnane (Cork)

16 February 2025 Round 3	Leitrim	0-7 (7) – (30) 1-27	Kildare	Ballinamore
14:00 IST (UTC+1)		(HT: 0-1 - 1-17)		Venue: Pairc Sean Ui Eslin
	Pts: T Prior 0-2, S Harkin 0-2, P Honeyman 0-2 (tp), B Guckian 0-1 (f)	Report	Gls: A Beirne 1 Pts: A Beirne 0-7 (4f), R Sinkey 0-4, B McLoughlin 0-3 (1tp), C Hagney 0-2, A Masterson 0-2 (tp), D Swords 0-2, K Feely 0-1, D Hyland 0-1, B McCormack 0-1, C Dalton 0-1, R Houlihan 0-1, D Cordonnier 0-1 ('45), R Teehan 0-1	Referee: Niall Cullen (Fermanagh)

==== Round 4 ====
22 February 2025 Round 4	Antrim	4-16 (28) – (14) 1-11	Leitrim	Belfast
14:30 IST (UTC+1)		(HT: 4-7 - 0-6)		Venue: Corrigan Park
	Gls: D McEnhill 1, N Burns 1, M Jordon 1, F Nagle 1 Pts: D McEnhill 0-4 (1f), N Burns 0-4, R McQuillan 0-3, R McCann 0-2, J Lenehan 0-2, C Johnston 0-1	Report	Gls: D Casey 1 Pts: P Honeyman 0-3 (1f), D Cox 0-2, T Prior 0-2, J Foley 0-1, D O'Shea 0-1, D Casey 0-1, K Keegan 0-1	Referee: Mark Dorrian (Donegal)

22 February 2025 Round 4	Kildare	0-21 (21) – (9) 0-9	Laois	Newbridge
19:00 IST (UTC+1)		(HT: 0-12 - 0-3)		Venue: St. Conleth's Park
	Pts: B McCormack 0-3 (1tp), N Kelly 0-3, C Bolton 0-2 (tp), C Hagney 0-2, A Beirne 0-2 (1f), D Swords 0-2, K Feely 0-2, B McLoughlin 0-2, D Cordonnier 0-1 ('45), D Hyland 0-1, N Dolan 0-1	Report	Pts: M Barry 0-3 (2f), R Coffey 0-2, P Kirwan 0-1, S Lacey 0-1, C Heffernan 0-1, J Hogan 0-1	Referee: Conor Lane (Cork)

23 February 2025 Round 4	Fermanagh	1-13 (16) – (15) 3-6	Offaly	Ederney
14:00 IST (UTC+1)		(HT: 1-10 - 1-1)
	Gls: D McCusker 1 Pts: G Jones 0-4 (2f), C Love 0-2, D McGurn 0-2, D McCusker 0-1, R McCaffrey 0-1, O Smyth 0-1, R Lyons 0-1, J L Ellis 0-1	Report	Gls: C Egan 1, C Bourke 1, D Hyland 1 Pts: K O'Neill 0-3 (3f), D Hyland 0-1, C Flynn 0-1, P Dunican 0-1 ('45)	Referee: Kevin Faloon (Armagh)

After a pitch inspection deeming the Markievicz Park pitch unplayable, Sligo's game against Clare was postponed to 9 March 2025.

9 March 2025 Round 4	Sligo	1-19 (22) – (20) 2-14	Clare	Sligo
13:30 IST (UTC+1)		(HT: 0-9 - 0-7)		Venue: Markievicz Park
	Gls: C Mulligan 1 Pts: N Murphy 0-5 (2f), P O'Connor 0-3, D Cummins 0-2, N Mullen 0-2, D Quinn 0-2 (1tp), L Towey 0-2, P Spillane 0-1, A Reilly 0-1, M Gordon 0-1	Report	Gls: E McMahon 1, A Griffin 1 Pts: E McMahon 0-6 (1tp, 1tpf), E Cleary 0-3 (2f), I Ugwueru 0-2, K Sexton 0-1, C Meaney 0-1	Referee: Kieran Eannetta (Tyrone)

==== Round 5 ====
1 March 2025 Round 5	Laois	0-22 (22) – (20) 1-17	Antrim	Portlaoise
17:00 IST (UTC+1)		(HT: 0-11 - 1-9)		Venue: O'Moore Park
	Pts: M Barry 0-8 (5f), N Corbet 0-4, D Larkin 0-3, P Kirwan 0-2, K Roche 0-2 (1tpf), B Dempsey 0-1, B Byrne 0-1, D O'Reilly 0-1	Report	Gls: C Hand 1 Pts: M Byrne 0-3 (1tpf, 1'45), P McBride 0-3 (1tp), N Burns 0-3, D McEnhill 0-3 (1f), D McAleese 0-2 (1tp), R McQuillan 0-2, C Johnston 0-1	Referee: Jonathon Hayes (Limerick)

1 March 2025 Round 5	Fermanagh	0-19 (19) – (19) 0-19	Sligo	Enniskillen
18:00 IST (UTC+1)		(HT: 0-7 - 0-8)		Venue: Brewster Park
	Pts: G Jones 0-5 (1tp), D McCusker 0-3 (1tp), F O'Brien 0-3 (1f), S Cassidy 0-3 (1tp), S McNally 0-2, J Cassidy 0-1, S McGullion 0-1 (f), J L Ellis 0-1	Report	Pts: N Murphy 0-4, D Quinn 0-4 (1tp), A McLoughlin 0-3 (1tp), D Cummins 0-3, D Lyons 0-2, R Doherty 0-1, P Spillane 0-1, P O'Connor 0-1	Referee: Diarmuid Boylan (Monaghan)

2 March 2025 Round 5	Clare	2-12 (18) – (16) 0-16	Kildare	Ennis
14:00 IST (UTC+1)		(HT: 1-9 - 0-6)		Venue: Cusack Park
	Gls: K Sexton 1, E Cleary 1 Pts: K Sexton 0-4 (2tp), E McMahon 0-3 (2f), D Coughlan 0-2, E Cleary 0-1 (1f), B McNamara 0-1, A Griffin 0-1	Report	Pts: A Beirne 0-6 (2tp), C Bolton 0-3, D Cordonnier 0-2 (1tpf), C Dalton 0-2, K Feely 0-2, B McCormack 0-1	Referee: Brendan Griffin (Kerry)

2 March 2025 Round 5	Leitrim	1-9 (12) – (16) 1-13	Offaly	Ballinamore
14:00 IST (UTC+1)		(HT: 0-6 - 1-7)		Venue: Pairc Sean Ui Eslin
	Gls: D Cox 1 Pts: P Honeyman 0-4 (4f), C Quinn 0-2, K Keegan 0-1, B Guckian 0-1, R O'Rourke 0-1	Report	Gls: J Furlong 1 Pts: K O'Neill 0-3 (2f), P Dunican 0-2 (1'45), D McDaid 0-1, K Higgins 0-1, C Flynn 0-1, D Hyland 0-1 (f), S Tierney 0-1, J Bryant 0-1, M Dalton 0-1, N Dunne 0-1	Referee: Alan Coyne (Westmeath)

==== Round 6 ====
15 March 2025 Round 6	Laois	1-21 (24) – (28) 2-22	Clare	Portlaoise
18:00 IST (UTC+1)		(HT: 1-13 - 1-7)		Venue: O'Moore Park
	Gls: R Coffey 1 Pts: M Barry 0-8 (4f), K Roche 0-4 (2tpf), C Heffernan 0-3 (1tp), N Corbet 0-2, D Larkin 0-1, K Swayne 0-1, J Hogan 0-1, B Byrne 0-1	Report	Gls: A Griffin 1, A Sweeney 1 Pts: E McMahon 0-7 (4f), A Griffin 0-4, E Cleary 0-3 (2f), M McInerney 0-3 (2'45), C Downes 0-2, I Ugwuera 0-1, B McNamara 0-1, D Walsh 0-1	Referee: David Murnane (Cork)

16 March 2025 Round 6	Antrim	1-15 (18) – (21) 1-18	Sligo	Belfast
14:00 IST (UTC+1)		(HT: 0-6 - 1-11)		Venue: Corrigan Park
	Gls: D McEnhill 1 Pts: M Byrne 0-6 (1tpf, 3'45, 1f), R McQuillan 0-3, E McCabe 0-1, E Walsh 0-1, P McBride 0-1 (f), C Johnston 0-1, R Boyle 0-1, D McEnhill 0-1	Report	Gls: L Towey 1 Pts: A McLoughlin 0-6 (1tpf, 1f), N Murphy 0-5 (1tpf, 2f), A Reilly 0-3, P Spillane 0-2, P O'Connor 0-1, C Lally 0-1	Referee: Noel Mooney (Cavan)

16 March 2025 Round 6	Offaly	2-17 (23) – (17) 0-17	Kildare	Tullamore
14:00 IST (UTC+1)		(HT: 0-11 - 0-10)		Venue: O'Connor Park
	Gls: R Egan 1, D Hyland 1 (pen); Pts: D Hyland 0-9 (2tp, 3f), C Egan 0-3, K O'Neill 0-2 (2f), J Furlong 0-1, J Bryant 0-1, S Tierney 0-1	Report	Pts: K Feely 0-4 (2f), C Hagney 0-3, R Sinkey 0-2, J Hyland 0-2 (1f), C Dalton 0-2, C Bolton 0-2, A Beirne 0-1, B McCormack 0-1	Referee: Paddy Neilan (Roscommon)

On 15 March, one day before it was scheduled to be played in Ballinamore, Leitrim forfeited its Round 6 fixture against Fermanagh due to not having a full team available.

==== Round 7 ====
23 March 2025 Round 7	Sligo	0-32 (32) – (10) 0-10	Leitrim	Sligo
14:00 IST (UTC+1)		(HT: 0-15 - 0-6)		Venue: Markievicz Park
	Pts: N Murphy 0-6, P Spillane 0-6, C Lally 0-5, A McLoughlin 0-3 (1f), A Reilly 0-2, P O'Connor 0-2 (tp), L Towey 0-2, S Deignan 0-2, P Kilcoyne 0-1, N Mullen 0-1, D Quinn 0-1, J Lavin 0-1	Report	Pts: R O'Rourke 0-4 (3f), T Prior 0-3, K Keegan 0-1, E Harkin 0-1, B Guckian 0-1 (f)	Referee: Alan Coyne (Westmeath)

23 March 2025 Round 7	Clare	2-14 (20) – (15) 2-9	Offaly	Ennis
14:00 IST (UTC+1)		(HT: 0-6 - 2-5)		Venue: Cusack Park
	Gls: A Griffin 2 Pts: K Sexton 0-4 (1'45), M McInerney 0-4 (2f, 1'45), E Cleary 0-4 (1f), C Rouine 0-1, E McMahon 0-1	Report	Gls: J Furlong 1, C Flynn 1 Pts: P Dunican 0-2 (tp), J Bryant 0-2, K O'Neill 0-1, D Hyland 0-1, S Tierney 0-1, N Dunne 0-1 (f), M Dalton 0-1	Referee: David Hickey (Carlow)

23 March 2025 Round 7	Fermanagh	1-18 (21) – (19) 2-13	Laois	Enniskillen
14:00 IST (UTC+1)		(HT: 1-6 - 0-8)		Venue: Brewster Park
	Gls: P Breen 1 Pts: G Jones 0-6 (1tpf, 4f), J L Ellis 0-3, F O'Brien 0-3 (2f), L Cullen 0-1, D McCusker 0-1, D McGurn 0-1, R Lyons 0-1, S Cassidy 0-1, C Love 0-1	Report	Gls: B Byrne 1, N Corbett 1 Pts: R Coffey 0-4 (1tp), N Corbett 0-3, K Roche 0-2 (tpf), M Barry 0-2, B Byrne 0-2	Referee: Enda McFeely (Donegal)

23 March 2025 Round 7	Kildare	1-26 (29) – (18) 1-15	Antrim	Newbridge
14:00 IST (UTC+1)		(HT: 0-9 - 0-14)		Venue: St. Conleth's Park
	Gls: N Kelly 1 Pts: A Beirne 0-6 (2tpf, 1f), D Kirwan 0-5 (2tpf), N Kelly 0-4, C Bolton 0-2, C Dalton 0-2, B McCormack 0-2, R Sinkey 0-1, K Feely 0-1 (f), P McDermott 0-1, B McLoughlin 0-1	Report	Gls: F Nagle 1 Pts: D McEnhill 0-8 (3tpf, 1tp), C Stewart 0-3 (1tp), P McBride 0-2 (tp), R McQullian 0-2 (1f)	Referee: Brendan Griffin (Kerry)

=== Final ===
30 March 2025	Kildare	1-18 (21) – (23) 2-17	Offaly	Dublin
13:45 IST (UTC+1)		(HT: 0-10 – 1-10)		Venue: Croke Park
	Gls: H O'Neill 1 Pts: A Beirne 0-5 (3f), D Kirwan 0-3 (2f), C Burke 0-2 (tpf), J McGrath 0-2, C Dalton 0-1, R Houlihan 0-1, C Bolton 0-1, N Kelly 0-1, P McDermott 0-1, D Swords 0-1	Report	Gls: J Bryant 1, C Egan 1 Pts: K O'Neill 0-4, J Bryant 0-3, J Hayes 0-2 (tp), D Hyland 0-2 (1f), S Tierney 0-2 (tp), C Egan 0-1, D McDaid 0-1, C Flynn 0-1, J McEvoy 0-1	Referee: Kieran Eannetta; TV: TG4

== Division 4 ==
=== Table ===
Pos	Team	Pld	W	D	L	PF	PA	PD	Pts	Qualification
1	Wexford	7	7	0	0	148	85	+63	14	Advance to NFL Division 4 Final and promotion to 2026 NFL Division 3
2	Limerick	7	4	2	1	157	120	+37	10	Advance to NFL Division 4 Final and promotion to 2026 NFL Division 3
3	Wicklow	7	4	1	2	149	133	+16	9	
4	Carlow	7	3	1	3	129	127	+2	7	
5	Tipperary	7	2	1	4	119	132	−13	5	
6	Longford	7	2	1	4	111	141	−30	5	
7	London	7	2	0	5	117	146	−29	4	
8	Waterford	7	1	0	6	111	157	−46	2	

Source: GAA.ie
Rules for classification: Tiebreakers

=== Matches ===
==== Round 1 ====
25 January 2025 Round 1	Carlow	2-13 (19) – (19) 1-16	Tipperary	Carlow
18:00 IST (UTC+1)		(HT: 1-10 - 0-7)		Venue: Dr. Cullen Park
	Gls: A Amond 1 (pen), R Dunphy 1 Pts: C Crowley 0-4 (1f), A Amond 0-2, R Dunphy 0-2, K Murphy 0-2 (tpf), M Bambrick 0-1, C Doyle 0-1, J Murphy 0-1	Report	Gls: S O'Connor 1 Pts: S O'Connor 0-5 (2f), M Russell 0-4 (1tp), S O'Brien 0-3 (1tpf), E Power 0-1, J Harney 0-1, B Comerford 0-1 (f), C Smith 0-1 (f)	Referee: Eoin Morrissey (Waterford)

25 January 2025 Round 1	Wexford	2-24 (30) – (12) 2-6	London	Wexford
19:00 IST (UTC+1)		(HT: 1-15 - 1-2)		Venue: Wexford Park
		Report		Referee: David Hickey (Carlow)

26 January 2025 Round 1	Longford	2-12 (18) – (18) 1-15	Limerick	Longford
14:00 IST (UTC+1)		(HT: 2-4 - 1-5)		Venue: Pearse Park
		Report		Referee: Mark Dorrian (Donegal)

Waterford's Round 1 trip to Wicklow was one of several league fixtures postponed because of Storm Éowyn.

8 February 2025 Round 1	Wicklow	3-17 (26) – (22) 1-19	Waterford	Aughrim
14:30 IST (UTC+1)		(HT: 2-10 - 0-4)		Venue: Echelon Park
		Report		Referee: Diarmuid Boylan (Monaghan)

==== Round 2 ====
1 February 2025 Round 2	Tipperary	3-13 (22) – (21) 1-18	Longford	Clonmel
14:30 IST (UTC+1)		(HT: 2-3 - 0-11)
		Report		Referee: Niall Quinn (Clare)

1 February 2025 Round 2	Waterford	0-12 (12) – (21) 2-15	Carlow	Dungarven
18:00 IST (UTC+1)		(HT: 0-5 - 1-6)		Venue: Fraher Field
		Report		Referee: Jonathon Hayes (Limerick)

2 February 2025 Round 2	London	1-20 (23) – (21) 0-21	Wicklow	Ruislip, London
12:30 IST (UTC+1)		(HT: 1-6 - 0-10)
		Report		Referee: Alan Coyne (Westmeath)

2 February 2025 Round 2	Limerick	0-13 (13) – (17) 0-17	Wexford	Rathkeale
14:00 IST (UTC+1)		(HT: 0-7 - 0-6)
		Report		Referee: Christopher Ryan (Galway)

==== Round 3 ====
15 February 2025 Round 3	Wexford	2-12 (18) – (9) 0-9	Carlow	Wexford
19:00 IST (UTC+1)		(HT: 1-8 - 0-3)		Venue: Wexford Park
		Report		Referee: Andrew Smith (Meath)

16 February 2025 Round 3	London	0-11 (11) – (19) 1-16	Limerick	Ruislip, London
12:30 IST (UTC+1)		(HT: 0-8 - 1-6)		Venue: McGovern Park
		Report		Referee: Pat Clarke (Cavan)

16 February 2025 Round 3	Waterford	0-9 (9) – (17) 1-14	Tipperary	Waterford
13:00 IST (UTC+1)		(HT: 0-7 - 1-5)		Venue: Walsh Park
		Report		Referee: David Hickey (Carlow)

16 February 2025 Round 3	Wicklow	2-15 (21) – (12) 0-12	Longford	Aughrim
14:00 IST (UTC+1)		(HT: 1-8 - 0-6)		Venue: Echelon Park
		Report		Referee: Eoin Morrissey (Waterford)

==== Round 4 ====
22 February 2025 Round 4	Tipperary	0-17 (17) – (18) 2-12	London	Thurles
17:00 IST (UTC+1)		(HT: 0-7 - 2-3)		Venue: Semple Stadium
		Report		Referee: Niall Quinn (Clare)

22 February 2025 Round 4	Carlow	0-13 (13) – (20) 1-17	Limerick	Carlow
18:00 IST (UTC+1)		(HT: 0-6 - 0-7)		Venue: Dr. Cullen Park
		Report		Referee: Christopher Ryan (Galway)

23 February 2025 Round 4	Longford	2-11 (17) – (15) 1-12	Waterford	Longford
14:00 IST (UTC+1)		(HT: 2-6 - 1-6)		Venue: Pearse Park
		Report		Referee: Enda McFeely (Donegal)

After a pitch inspection deeming Wexford Park unplayable, Wexford's game against Wicklow was postponed to 8 March 2025.

8 March 2025 Round 4	Wexford	0-20 (20) – (12) 0-12	Wicklow	Wexford
18:00 IST (UTC+1)		(HT: 0-12 - 0-4)		Venue: Wexford Park
		Report		Referee: David Hickey (Carlow)

==== Round 5 ====
1 March 2025 Round 5	Waterford	0-11 (11) – (23) 2-17	Wexford	Dungarvan
18:30 IST (UTC+1)		(HT: 0-5 - 1-11)		Venue: Fraher Park
		Report		Referee: Chris Maguire (Clare)

1 March 2025 Round 5	Limerick	2-21 (24) – (17) 3-8	Tipperary	Rathkeale
18:30 IST (UTC+1)		(HT: 1-13 - 2-6)		Venue: Mick Neville Park
		Report		Referee: Andrew Smith (Meath)

2 March 2025 Round 5	London	1-12 (15) – (16) 0-16	Longford	Ruislip, London
12:30 IST (UTC+1)		(HT: 0-8 - 0-8)		Venue: McGovern Park
		Report		Referee: Kevin Faloon (Armagh)

2 March 2025 Round 5	Wicklow	2-18 (24) – (20) 2-14	Carlow	Aughrim
14:00 IST (UTC+1)		(HT: 0-12 - 0-10)		Venue: Echelon Park
		Report		Referee: Pat Clarke (Cavan)

==== Round 6 ====
15 March 2025 Round 6	Carlow	2-20 (26) – (13) 0-13	Longford	Carlow
17:30 IST (UTC+1)		(HT: 2-13 - 0-2)		Venue: Dr. Cullen Park
		Report		Referee: Niall Quinn (Clare)

15 March 2025 Round 6	Wexford	1-13 (16) – (15) 1-12	Tipperary	Wexford
18:30 IST (UTC+1)		(HT: 0-5 - 0-9)		Venue: Wexford Park
		Report		Referee: Seamus Mulhare (Laois)

15 March 2025 Round 6	Waterford	1-19 (22) – (17) 2-11	London	Dungarven
19:00 IST (UTC+1)		(HT: 0-7 - 0-6)		Venue: Fraher Field
		Report		Referee: Sean Lonergan (Tipperary)

16 March 2025 Round 6	Wicklow	3-15 (24) – (24) 1-21	Limerick	Aughrim
14:00 IST (UTC+1)		(HT: 1-7 - 1-8)		Venue: Echelon Park
		Report		Referee: Conor Dourneen (Cavan)

==== Round 7 ====
23 March 2025 Round 7	Limerick	4-24 (36) – (20) 1-17	Waterford	Rathkeale
13:00 IST (UTC+1)		(HT: 2-9 - 1-8)		Venue: Mick Neville Park
				Referee: Barry Judge (Sligo)

23 March 2025 Round 7	Tipperary	0-12 (12) – (21) 0-21	Wicklow	Clonmel
13:00 IST (UTC+1)		(HT: 0-6 - 0-12)
		Report		Referee: Eoin Morrissey (Waterford)

23 March 2025 Round 4	Longford	1-10 (13) – (24) 2-18	Wexford	Longford
13:00 IST (UTC+1)		(HT: 2-6 - 1-6)		Venue: Pearse Park
		Report		Referee: Pat Clarke (Cavan)

23 March 2025 Round 7	London	1-17 (20) – (21) 1-18	Carlow	Ruislip, London
13:00 IST (UTC+1)		(HT: 1-8 - 0-10)		Venue: McGovern Park
				Referee: Andrew Smith (Meath)

=== Final ===
29 March 2025	Wexford	0-18 (18) – (20) 3-11	Limerick	Dublin
17:00 IWT (UTC±0)		(HT: 0-6 – 1-5)		Venue: Croke Park
		Report		Referee: Seamus Mulhare; Attendance: 11,450

== Incidents ==
Live on television, in the National League meeting of Armagh and Donegal at MacCumhaill Park, Armagh's 2024 All-Ireland SFC-winning captain Aidan Forker headbutted Michael Murphy in the 44th minute. This was within moments of Murphy's reintroduction (as a substitute) to inter-county football, and referee Sean Hurson sent Forker off. Forker's headbutt of Michael Murphy was widely compared to Zinedine Zidane's headbutt during the 2006 FIFA World Cup final, though — unlike Zidane's opponent — Murphy stood firm and did not even move.

== Statistics ==
- James Naughton of Limerick scored 4–12 against Waterford at Mick Neville Park in Rathkeale, one point more than the previous record for highest individual score in a single inter-county match, set by Frankie Donnelly of Tyrone against Fermanagh in the 1957 Dr Lagan Cup.
