= Mick Neville Park =

Gaelic games stadium in Rathkeale, Ireland

- Páirc Mhichíl Neville
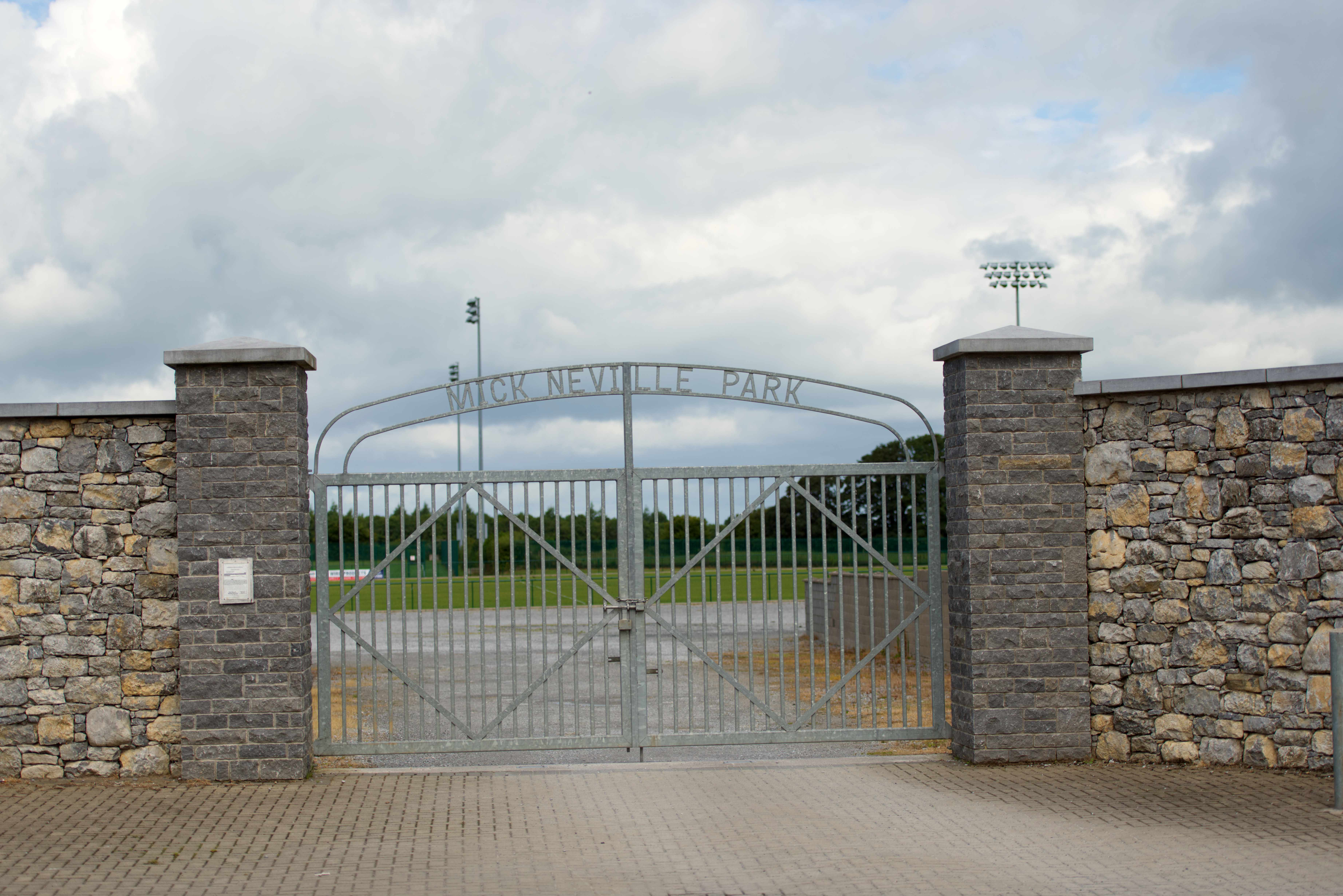
- Entrance gates

- Location within Ireland
- Location: Rathkeale, County Limerick, Ireland
- Coordinates: 52°31′31″N 8°55′46″W
- Owner: Limerick GAA
- Capacity: 2,000
- Surface: grass
- Public transit: Rathkeale bus stop (routes 13, 14, 321)

Construction
- Opened: 2015
- Renovated: 2022

Mick Neville Park (Irish: Páirc Mhichíl Neville) is a Gaelic games stadium, located in Rathkeale, County Limerick. It serves as a secondary home venue for Limerick teams, after the Gaelic Grounds in Limerick City.

== History ==
The stadium is named for Mick Neville (1891–1973), an inter-county hurler of the 1920s who played with both the Dublin and Limerick county teams; he was later a referee and the treasurer of the West Limerick Board. The site for new county grounds in Rathkeale was gifted to the County Board by the Neville family, so they were named for him.

The first stage of the development was unveiled in 2008. In 2012, planning permission was granted for works to complete the main playing pitch in the "centre of excellence," with a seated spectator stand. It began to host inter-county games in 2017.

A new 800-seater stand, costing €1.2 million, was added in 2022. In total the grounds can accommodate 2,000 people.

James Naughton of Limerick scored 4-12 (24 points) against Waterford at Mick Neville Park in the 2025 National Football League, one point more than the previous record for highest individual score in a single inter-county match, set by Frankie Donnelly of Tyrone against Fermanagh in the 1957 Dr Lagan Cup.

== See also ==
- List of Gaelic Athletic Association stadiums
- List of stadiums in Ireland by capacity
