= Rathkeale =

Town in County Limerick, Ireland

Rathkeale Ráth Caola
- Town
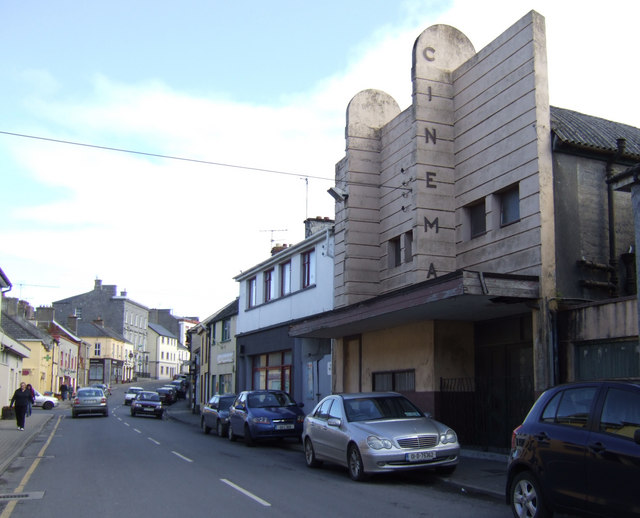
- Rathkeale main street, with former Central Cinema

- Location in Ireland
- Coordinates: 52.516667°N 8.933333°W
- Country: Ireland
- Province: Munster
- County: County Limerick
- Elevation: 45 m (148 ft)

Population (2016)
  - Total: 1,441
- Irish Grid Reference: R360420

Rathkeale (Irish: Ráth Caola, meaning 'Caola's ringfort') is a town in west County Limerick, in Ireland. It is 30 km (18 mi) southwest of Limerick city on the N21 road to Tralee, County Kerry, and lies on the River Deel. The town is in a townland and civil parish of the same name.

It has a significant Irish Traveller population, and since 1995, almost half the town residents have been members of the travelling community. Rathkeale also has the largest concentration of descendants of the German Palatines who immigrated to Ireland in the early 18th century.

Rathkeale has shopping facilities, a museum, two primary schools, and a community college (Coláiste na Trócaire, founded in 1995). The town has a large Roman Catholic parish church, St. Mary's, Augustinian Abbey ruins, and the Holy Trinity Church of Ireland church.

== History ==
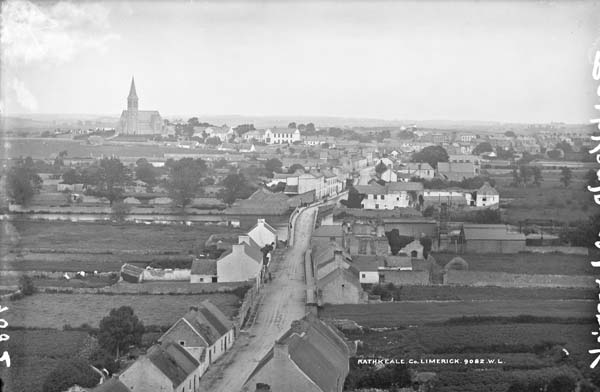
Rathkeale in the late 19th or early 20th century

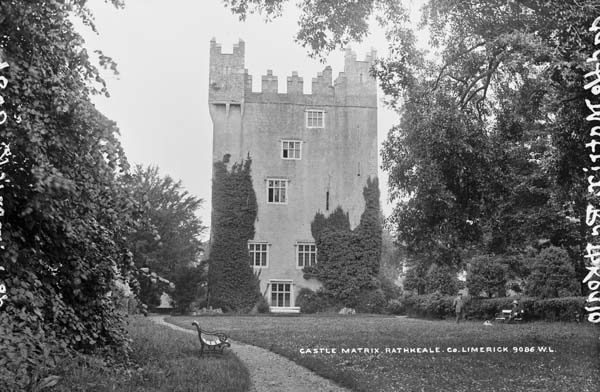
Castle Matrix, Rathkeale circa 1900

On the southwestern edge of the town is the 15th-century tower house of Castle Matrix. The castle was built as a fortress during the early 1400s by Thomas FitzGerald, 7th Earl of Desmond, and was later the home of Maurice FitzGerald, 9th Earl of Desmond. It contains a display of art objects, holds historical records, and is one of a series of significant Desmond properties in County Limerick (see also Adare, Askeaton, and Newcastle West).

In the cemetery of the Holy Trinity Church are many gravestones bearing names of Irish Palatine families. These families came from Rheinland-Pfalz, in the Rhineland Palatinate, Germany as refugees in 1709. Many of their descendants now live in North America. The region around Rathkeale, namely the townlands of Killeheen, Ballingrane, and Courtmatrix, contains the largest concentration of Palatine descendants in Ireland today. Rathkeale's former railway station on the closed North Kerry railway line from Limerick to Tralee has been converted into the Irish Palatine Museum.

== Transport ==
Rathkeale is served by Bus Eireann routes 13 and 14 which operate between Limerick and Tralee and Killarney respectively.

The area was formerly served by Rathkeale railway station, which opened in January 1867. Having closed for passenger traffic in February 1963, it was permanently closed in December 1974.

The Great Southern Trail, an off-road trail for cyclists and walkers, is a greenway rail trail which follows the route of the former Limerick-Tralee railway line between Rathkeale and Abbeyfeale.

== Sport ==
Mick Neville Park, a large Gaelic Athletic Association (GAA) training facility in Rathkeale, is owned by Limerick GAA. It is used by the county teams for training and some matches. It has also hosted club games throughout the GAA season.

The local GAA club, Rathkeale GAA, fields both hurling and football teams. Their home ground, nicknamed "the bog garden," is just outside the north side of the town.

Rathkeale A.F.C. is an association football (soccer) club that competes in the Limerick Desmond League Premier Division. Their home ground is at Holy Cross, just outside the north side of the town.

== People ==
- Sean (Jackie) Finn, Brigadier of the 4th (Rathkeale) West Limerick Battalion of the IRA during the Irish War of Independence was a native of Rathkeale. His grave in the local graveyard features an impressive Celtic cross.
- The town is reportedly home to many members of the Rathkeale Rovers crime group, who own much of the property within the town.

== See also ==
- List of towns and villages in Ireland
