= 2024 Limerick Premier Intermediate Hurling Championship =

- Dates: 25 July – 27 October 2024
- Teams: 8
- Sponsor: Lyons of Limerick
- Champions: Newcastle West (1st title); Brian Hurley (captain); Derry McMahon (manager)
- Runners-up: Garryspillane; Colin Ryan (captain); Aaron Considine (manager)
- Relegated: Na Piarsaigh

Tournament statistics
- Matches played: 31
- Goals scored: 90 (2.9 per match)
- Points scored: 967 (31.19 per match)
- Top scorer(s): Patrick O'Donovan (5–72)

The 2024 Limerick Premier Intermediate Hurling Championship was the 11th staging of the Limerick Premier Intermediate Hurling Championship since its establishment by the Limerick County Board in 2014. The draws for the group stage pairings took place on 6 February 2024. The championship ran from 25 July to 27 October 2024.

The final was played on 27 October 2024 at the TUS Gaelic Grounds in Limerick, between Newcastle West and Garryspillane, in what was their first ever meeting in the final. Newcastle West won the match by 2–12 to 1–11 to claim their first ever championship title.

Effin's Patrick O'Donovan was the championship's top scorer with 5–72.

== Team changes ==
=== To Championship ===
Relegated from the Limerick Senior Hurling Championship

- Garryspillane

Promoted from the Limerick Intermediate Hurling Championship

- Granagh-Ballingarry

=== From Championship ===
Promoted to the Limerick Senior Hurling Championship

- Dromin/Athlacca

Relegated to the Limerick Intermediate Hurling Championship

- Cappamore

== Group stage ==
=== Group stage table ===
Knockout stage Relegated

Team	Matches				Score			Pts
Team	Pld	W	D	L	For	Against	Diff	Pts
Newcastle West	7	6	0	1	153	119	34	12
Garryspillane	7	5	0	2	167	128	39	10
Bruff	7	5	0	2	137	132	5	10
Effin	7	4	0	3	160	140	20	8
Granagh-Ballingarry	7	4	0	3	145	138	7	8
Blackrock	7	3	0	4	146	136	10	6
Glenroe	7	1	0	6	93	167	−74	2
Na Piarsaigh	7	0	0	7	127	168	−41	0

=== Group stage results ===
25 July 2024 Round 1	Granagh-Ballingarry	0–14 – 1–18	Newcastle West	Seán Finn Park
	D O'Donovan 0–4, C O'Keeffe 0–3, D Casey 0–2, R Mullins 0–1, J Mulcaire-Quille 0–1, D O'Connor 0–1, M Russell 0–1, L Flynn 0–1.		Eoin Hurley 0–11, Ethan Hurley 1–5, C Hayes 0–2.

27 July 2024 Round 1	Effin	2–18 – 3–16	Garryspillane	Bruff Grounds
	P O'Donovan 1–11, E Dillon 0–4, T Quaid 1–0, R O'Connor 0–2, F O'Connor 0–1.		C Ryan 2–3, H Flanagan 0–4, M Quinlan 1–1, J English 0–3, R Tobin 0–2, E O'Mahony 0–1, C Sheehan 0–1, B Heavey 0–1.

1 August 2024 Round 2	Bruff	1–18 – 0–14	Granagh-Ballingarry	Paddy Carroll Park
	T Boddy 0–5 (4f), C Browne 0–4, D Butler 1–1, P O’Riordan 0–2, S Murnane 0–1, K Bonnar 0–1, S Finn 0–1, D O’Leary 0–1, P Browne 0–1.	Report	S O’Connor 0–7 (5f), D Casey 0–2, L Flynn 0–2, D O’Connor 0–1 (f), E Horgan 0–1, D O’Donovan 0–1.

3 August 2024 Round 2	Garryspillane	2–11 – 0–16	Blackrock	FitzGerald Park
	H Flanagan 0–5 (three frees); C Ryan 1–2; C Sheehan 1–1; J English, P Morrissey, S Ryan 0–1 each.	Report	C Keeffe 0–8 (seven frees); P Leahy 0–3; R McCarthy 0–2; R O'Shaughnessy, J Quility (one '65) 0–1 each.

4 August 2024 Round 2	Na Piarsaigh	2–20 – 2–25	Effin	Bruff Grounds
	E Sweeney 2–7 (0–5 frees), P Gleeson 0–7 (4 frees), P O'Neill, J Daly, J Finn, K Daly, M Hogan, J O'Brien (free) 0–1 each.	Report	P O'Donovan 0–11 (5 frees, 1 '65'), J Quaid 2–1, E Dillon 0–5, R O'Connor 0–3, P O'Kelly 0–2, N Quaid, C Doherty, F O'Connor, C O'Riordan 0–1 each.

4 August 2024 Round 2	Newcastle West	1–20 – 0–17	Glenroe	Paddy Carroll Park
	Eoin Hurley 0–8 (6f), B Hurley 1–2, Cathal Hayes 0–3, Con Hayes 0–3, Ethan Hurley 0–2 (2f) B Foley 0–1, M McMahon 0–1 (1f).	Report	M O’Connell 0–13 (10f, 1 65), D Frewen 0–3, O Browne 0–1.

8 August 2024 Round 3	Glenroe	0–07 – 1–17	Effin	FitzGerald Park
	M O'Connell 0–3 (3 frees), Z McCarthy 0–2, D Frewen, S Clancy 0–1 each.	Report	P O'Donovan 0–11 (5 frees), J Quaid 1–0, F O'Connor, N Quaid 0–2 each, C O'Riordan, R O'Connor 0–1 each;

10 August 2024 Round 3	Newcastle West	1–17 – 0–11	Bruff	Ballingarry Grounds
	Eoin Hurley 1–7 (four frees); C Hayes, D Lyons, M Cremin 0–2 each; Ethan Hurley (one free), B Hurley, E McMahon, D Kelly 0–1 each.	Report	D O'Leary 0–4 (three frees, one '65); C Browne 0–3 (one free); D Butler, M O'Riordan, P Finn, P O'Riordan 0–1 each

11 August 2024 Round 3	Blackrock	1–20 – 1–11	Na Piarsaigh	Bruff Grounds
	C O'Keeffe 0–8 (0–8 frees), C Ensor 1–0, J Quilty 0–3, R O'Shaughnessy 0–2, B O'Shaughnessy 0–2, P Leahy 0–2, S O'Neill 0–2, R McCarthy 0–1	Report	E Sweeney 0–5 (0–5 frees), J Finn 1–0, J O'Brien 0–2, M Hogan 0–2, J Beary and P O'Neill 0–1 each.

14 August 2024 Round 3	Granagh-Ballingarry	2–20 – 2–17	Garryspillane	Bruff Grounds
	S O'Connor 1–11 (0–9 frees), L Flynn 1–4, D Casey, D O'Donovan 0–2 each, C O'Keeffe 0–1;	Report	S Ryan 1–3 (3 frees), D O'Shea 0–5 (2 frees), B Heavey 0–4, R Tobin 1–0, C Sheehan, C Sheehan 0–2 each, C Ryan 0–1.

23 August 2024 Round 1	Bruff	2–17 – 2–14	Blackrock	FitzGerald Park
	J Keating 0–8 (8 frees), S Finn 0–4, O Meaney (2 frees), M O'Riordan 1–1 each, C Browne, P Finn, P O'Riordan 0–1 each;	Report	C O'Keeffe 0–7 (6 frees), P Leahy 1–2 (1–0 penalty), J Quilty 1–1, R McCarthy 0–2, S Lyons, S O'Neill 0–1 each.

29 August 2024 Round 4	Bruff	2–18 – 1–12	Glenroe	Knocklong Grounds
	J Keating 0–8 (0–7 frees), M O'Riordan, D Dennehy 1–0 each, S Finn, P Browne, P O'Riordan, 0–2 each, O Meaney, K Bonnar, D Butler, D O'Leary 0–1 each.	Report	M O'Connell 0–6 (all frees), D Frewen 1–1, S O'Donoghue 0–2, B O'Connell, D McCarthy, C Kelly 0–1 each.

29 August 2024 Round 4	Garryspillane	1–12 – 0–19	Newcastle West	Paddy Carroll Park
	H Flanagan 1–7 (1–0 penalty, 0–6 frees), C Ryan 0–4, R Tobin 0–1.`	Report	Eoin Hurley 0–10 (9 frees), C Hayes 0–4, B Nix, B Foley 0–2 each, S Hurley 0–1;

31 August 2024 Round 4	Effin	2–22 – 3–14	Blackrock	FitzGerald Park
	P O'Donovan 1–10 (four frees); J Quaid 1–2; E Dillon 0–4; T Quaid, F O'Connor, C O'Riordan, R O'Connor, C Kearney, R O'Neill 0–1 each.	Report	P Leahy 2–2 (2–0 penalties); C O'Keeffe 0–6, (five frees, one '65); J Quilty 1–1; S O'Neill 0–2; D Heffernan, R O'O'Shaughnessy, M Farrell 0–1 each.

1 September 2024 Round 4	Na Piarsaigh	0–12 – 1–20	Granagh-Ballingarry	Moneteen Grounds
	P O'Neill 0–6 (5 frees), M Hogan 0–2, K Ryan, J Sheehan, A Dempsey, B Moran 0–1 each.	Report	S O'Connor 0–8 (3 frees), L Flynn 1–2, C O'Keeffe 0–4, M Russell 0–2, D Casey, E Lynch, D O'Donovan, D O'Connor (free) 0–1 each.

7 September 2024 Round 5	Glenroe	0–11 – 0–23	Blackrock	Knocklong Grounds
	M O'Connell 0–4 (4 frees), L Dennehy 0–3, D Frewen 0–2, D McCarthy, D McCarthy 0–1 each.	Report	C O'Keeffe 0–6 (4 frees), S O'Neill 0–4, F Heffernan 0–3, R McCarthy, P Leahy (1 free), J Quilty, S Lyons, R O'Shaughnessy 0–2 each.

7 September 2024 Round 5	Granagh-Ballingarry	1–16 – 2–21	Effin	Paddy Carroll Park
	S O'Connor 0–8 (0–6 frees), D Casey 0–4, P Murphy 1–0, C O'Keeffe 0–3, D O'Donovan 0–1.	Report	P O'Donovan 2–10, E Dillon 0–4, T Quaid 0–2, R O'Connor, P O'Kelly, F O'Connor, J Quaid and E Kelly 0–1 each.

7 September 2024 Round 5	Bruff	1–13 – 4–17	Garryspillane	FitzGerald Park
	J Keating (1–7, 0–2 frees,0–1 65), K Bonnar 0–3, P Browne, B McNamara and P O'Riordan 0–1 each.	Report	D O'Shea 0–6, 0–1 free), C Ryan 2–1, B Heavey and C Sheehan 1–2 each, H Flanagan 0–2, R Tobin and S Ryan 0–1 free each, J Morrissey and D Heavey 0–1 each.

8 September 2024 Round 5	Newcastle West	2–22 – 4–13	Na Piarsaigh	Brother Rice Field
	B Nix 1–4, Con Hayes, Eoin Hurley (3 frees) 0–5 each; D Kelly 1–1, M Quilligan (1 free), B Hurley 0–2 each, D Lyons, C Hayes, M Cremin 0–1 each.	Report	P O'Neill 2–7, K Daly, D McLoughlin 1–0 each, A Dempsey, J Sheehan 0–2 each, M Hogan, K Daly 0–1 each.

19 September 2024 Round 6	Na Piarsaigh	2–17 – 1–24	Bruff	Mick Neville Park
	P O'Neill 2–7 (0–4 frees), A Dempsey (2 '65's, 1 free), J O'Brien 0–4 each, Marcus Hogan, Mark Hogan 0–1 each.	Report	J Keating 1–8 (5 frees), P Browne 0–6, O Meaney 0–4 (2 frees, 1 '65'), D O'Leary, D Butler 0–2, P Finn, S Finn 0–1 each;

21 September 2024 Round 6	Garryspillane	6–23 – 1–10	Glenroe	Michael Fox Park
	D O’Shea 0–9 (4 frees), B Heavey 2–2, H Flanagan 0–6 (2 frees), C Ryan 1–3, E O’Mahony 1–1, C Sheehan, R Tobin 1–0 each, C Sheehan, Quinlan 0–1 each.	Report	D Frewen 0–8 (7 frees), C Kelly 1–0, S Walsh, C Hogan 0–1 each.

21 September 2024 Round 6	Blackrock	4–11 – 3–17	Granagh-Ballingarry	FitzGerald Park
	R McCarthy 2–1; C O’Keeffe 0–5 (0–4 frees); P Leahy 1–2 (1–0 pen, 0–1 free); E O’Shaughnessy 1–0; S O’Neill, F Heffernan, J Quilty (free) 0–1 each.	Report	S O’Connor 0–8 (all frees); P Murphy 1–2; D O’Donovan, D Casey 1–1 each; L Flynn 0–3; E Lynch, J Cagney 0–1 each.

22 September 2024 Round 6	Effin	0–19 – 2–19	Newcastle West	Páirc Caoimhín Ó Luing
	P O'Donovan 0–10, C O'Riordan 0–2, E Dillon 0–2, E Kelly 0–2, R O'Connor 0–1, C Kearney 0–1, P O'Kelly 0–1.	Report	B Nix 1–3, Eoin Hurley 0–6, Cathal Hayes 1–0, Con Hayes 0–3, B Hurley 0–2, B Foley 0–1, J Whelan 0–1, M Quilligan 0–1, D Lyons 0–1, M McMahon 0–1.

26 September 2024 Round 1	Glenroe	1–16 – 1–10	Na Piarsaigh	Fr Hayes Memorial Park
	M O'Connell 1–11 (1–0 penalty, 0–9 frees), C Kelly, D McCarthy 0–2 each, D Frewen 0–1;	Report	P O'Neill 0–7 (7 frees), K Daly 1–0, M Hogan 0–2, M Hogan 0–1.

5 October 2024 Round 7	Bruff	1–12 – 0–11	Effin	Michael Fox Park
	O Meaney 0–10 (0–7 frees, 0–1 ’65); D Dennehy 1–0; J Keating (free); G Bracken 0–1 each.	Report	P O’Donovan 0–4 (0–2 frees); N Quaid 0–3; T Quaid 0–2; R O’Connor, F O’Connor 0–1 each.

5 October 2024 Round 7	Garryspillane	1–14 – 0–14	Na Piarsaigh	Fr Hayes Memorial Park
	H Flanagan 0–6 (4 frees), D O'Shea 0–4 (1 free), C Sheehan 1–0, M Quinlan 0–2 (1 free), R Tobin, C Ryan 0–1 each;	Report	P O'Neill 0–9 (8 frees), P Gleeson (free), Marcus Hogan, Mark Hogan, J O'Brien (free), E Condon (free) 0–1 each.

5 October 2024 Round 7	Glenroe	0–11 – 3–14	Granagh-Ballingarry	FitzGerald Park
	P Murphy 2–1, E Lynch 1–0, S O'Connor (0–7, 0–5 frees, 0–1 sideline), C O'Keefe 0–4, D O'Donovan and L Flynn 0–1 each.	Report	M O'Connell (0–7, 0–5 frees, 0–2 65's) D Frewan 0–2, S Maloney and B O'Connell 0–1 each.

5 October 2024 Round 7	Newcastle West	0–17 – 3–09	Blackrock	Paddy Carroll Park
	Eoin Hurley 0–7 (three frees), C Hayes 0–4, B Hurley, M McMahon (one free) 0–2 each, M Quilligan (free), B Foley 0–1 each.	Report	J Quilty 1–3 (one free), C O’Keeffe 0–4 (three frees), B O’Shaughnessy 1–0, D Moloney 1–0 each, R McCarthy, R O'Shaughnessy 0–1 each.

== Knockout stage ==
=== Semi-finals ===
12 October 2024 Semi-final	Bruff	1–14 – 2–14	Garryspillane	FitzGerald Park
	O Meaney 1–4 (1-4f), J Keating 0–4 (3f), D O’Leary and B O’Brien 0–2 each, G Bracken and D Butler 0–1 each.	Report	H Flanagan 1–3 (2f), D O’Shea 0–5 (4f), C Ryan 1–1, B Heavey 0–3, M Quinlan and C Sheehan 0–1 each.

12 October 2024 Semi-final	Effin	2–13 – 3–13	Newcastle West	FitzGerald Park
	P O’Donovan 1–5 (0–4 frees); J Quaid 0–3; R O’Connor 0–2; T Quaid 1–0; C O’Riordan, F O’Connor, E Dillon 0–1.	Report	Eoin Hurley 0–8 (0–5, ’65); B Nix 1–2; B Hurley, B Foley 1–0 each; Con Hayes, D Lyons, Cathal Hayes 0–1 each.

=== Final ===
27 October 2024 Final	Garryspillane	1–11 – 2–12	Newcastle West	TUS Gaelic Grounds
	H Flanagan 1–6 (0–5 frees) B Heavey 0–2 (0–1 free); C Ryan, E O’Mahony, D O’Shea (sideline) 0–1 each.	Report	Eoin Hurley 1–5 (0–4 frees, 0–1 ’65); D Kelly 1–0; Con Hayes, M Quilligan (both frees) 0–2 each; Ethan Hurley, B Hurley, Cathal Hayes 0–1 each.	Referee: E Stapleton (Doon)

== Championship statistics ==
=== Top scorers ===
Overall

Rank	Player	Club	Tally	Total	Matches	Average
1	Patrick O'Donovan	Effin	5–72	87	8	10.87
2	Eoin Hurley	Newcastle West	2–67	73	9	10.42
3	Seán O'Connor	Granagh-Ballingarry	1–49	52	6	8.66
4	Pa O'Neill	Na Piarsaigh	4–38	50	7	7.14
5	Hugh Flanagan	Garryspillane	3–39	48	8	6.00
6	Mark O'Connell	Glenroe	1–44	47	6	7.83
7	Colm O'Keeffe	Blackrock	0–44	44	7	6.28
8	Josh Keating	Bruff	2–36	42	7	6.00
9	Colin Ryan	Garryspillane	7–17	38	9	4.22
10	Dylan O'Shea	Garryspillane	0–30	30	7	4.28

In a single game

Rank	Player	Club	Tally	Total	Opposition
1	Patrick O'Donovan	Effin	2–10	16	Granagh-Ballingarry
2	Patrick O'Donovan	Effin	1–11	14	Garryspillane
2	Seán O'Connor	Granagh-Ballingarry	1–11	14	Garryspillane
2	Mark O'Connell	Glenroe	1–11	14	Na Piarsaigh
5	Pa O'Neill	Na Piarsaigh	2–07	13	Bruff
5	Pa O'Neill	Na Piarsaigh	2–07	13	Newcastle West
5	Evan Sweeney	Na Piarsaigh	2–07	13	Effin
5	Patrick O'Donovan	Effin	1–10	13	Blackrock
5	Mark O'Connell	Glenroe	0–13	13	Newcastle West
10	Josh Keating	Bruff	1–08	11	Na Piarsaigh
10	Patrick O'Donovan	Effin	0–11	11	Glenroe
10	Patrick O'Donovan	Effin	0–11	11	Na Piarsaigh
10	Eoin Hurley	Newcastle West	0–11	11	Granagh-Ballingarry
