= Cathal O'Neill =

Irish hurler

Personal information
- Native name: Cathal Ó Néill (Irish)
- Born: 4 May 2002 (age 24) Crecora, County Limerick, Ireland
- Occupation: Student
- Height: 6 ft 3 in (191 cm)

Sport
- Sport: Hurling
- Position: Centre-forward
Club
- Years: Club
- 2020-present: Crecora/Manister
Club titles
- Limerick titles: 0
College
- Years: College
- 2021-present: University of Limerick
College titles
- Fitzgibbon titles: 3
Inter-county*
Years	County	Apps (scores)
2021-present	Limerick	31 (2-67)
Inter-county titles
- Munster titles: 5
- All-Irelands: 4
- NHL: 2
- All Stars: 1
- *Inter County team apps and scores correct as of 00:08, 31 October 2026.

,.

Cathal O'Neill (born 4 May 2002) is an Irish hurler. At club level, he plays with Crecora/Manister and at inter-county level with the Limerick senior hurling team.

== Early life ==
Born and raised in Crecora, County Limerick, O'Neill was educated at Ardscoil Rís in Limerick. He played in all grades of hurling during his time there and won a Dr Harty Cup medal in February 2018, after scoring 1–03 from play in the 3–18 to 2–10 win over Midleton CBS in the final.

During his studies at the University of Limerick (UL), O'Neill continued his hurling development. He won a league and championship double with the freshers' team in 2022. O'Neill was a panel member when UL beat the University of Galway by 4–19 to 1–13 to win the Fitzgibbon Cup tite in February 2023. He won further Fitzgibbon Cup medals in 2025 and 2026, when UL won back-to-back titles.

== Club career ==
O'Neill began his club career at juvenile and underage levels with Crecora/Manister. He eventually progressed to the club's adult team in the Limerick Premier JAHC.

== Inter-county career ==
O'Neill first appeared on the inter-county scene for Limerick during a two-year tenure with the minor team. He was the team's top scorer in his first year with the team in 2018, as well as ending the campaign by being named on the Team of the Year. O'Neill captained Limerick to the Munster MHC title in June 2019, following a 1–17 to 1–11 win over Clare in the final. He was again named on the Team of the Year, while he was also named Munster Minor Hurler of the Year. O'Neill immediately progressed to the under-20 team.

O'Neill made his senior team in a 0–26 to 1–17 National Hurling League defeat by Galway in May 2021. He later won a Munster SHC medal, as a panel member, as Limerick claimed a third consecutive title for the first time in 85 years following a 3–21 to 2–29 win over Tipperary. O'Neill later added an All-Ireland SHC medal to his collection, again as a panel member, following the 3–32 to 1–22 defeat of Cork.

O'Neill's continued development as a member of Limerick's senior team made him ineligible for the under-20 team. Limerick retained the Munster SHC title for a fourth consecutive year in June 2022, with O'Neill scoring two points in the 1–29 to 0–29 extra-time win over Clare. He later won his second consecutive All-Ireland SHC medal, his first on the field of play, after coming on as a substitute for Tom Morrissey in the 1–31 to 2–26 win over Kilkenny in the 2022 All-Ireland SHC final.

O'Neill won his first National League medal in April 2023, after scoring a point in the 2–20 to 0–15 win over Kilkenny in the final. He later claimed his third Munster SHC medal, as Limerick beat Clare by 1–23 to 1–22 to win a record-equalling fifth consecutive title. O'Neill again came on as a substitute for Tom Morrissey when Limerick won a record-equalling fourth consecutive All-Ireland SHC title, following a 0–30 to 2–15 win over Kilkenny in the 2023 All-Ireland SHC final.

O'Neill was at centre-forward when Limerick won a record-breaking sixth consecutive Munster SHC title after a 1–26 to 1–20 win over Clare in the 2024 Munster SHC final. After a trophy-less 2025 season, Limerick regained the National League title with a six-point win over Cork in April 2026, with O'Neill claiming his second winners' medal. He later collected a fifth Munster SHC medal, as Limerick also regained that title with a 1–21 to 2–17 win over Cork in the final. O'Neill won a fourth All-Ireland SHC medal, as well as being named man of the match, after a 1–29 to 1–18 win over Galway in the 2026 All-Ireland SHC final.

== Career statistics ==
As of 19 July 2026

Team	Year	National League			Munster		All-Ireland		Total	
Team	Year	Division	Apps	Score	Apps	Score	Apps	Score	Apps	Score
Limerick	2021	Division 1A	3	0-02	0	0-00	0	0-00	3	0-02
Limerick	2022	Division 1A	5	1-08	4	0-11	2	0-01	11	1-20
Limerick	2023	Division 1A	4	0-06	5	1-09	2	0-03	11	1-18
Limerick	2024	Division 1A	6	0-09	5	0-11	1	0-03	12	0-23
Limerick	2025	Division 1A	3	0-04	4	0-07	1	0-01	8	0-12
Limerick	2026	Division 1A	6	3-13	5	0-15	2	1-06	13	4-34
Career total			27	4-42	23	1-53	8	1-14	58	6-109

== Honours ==
Ardscoil Rís

- Dr Harty Cup (1): 2018

University of Limerick

- Fitzgibbon Cup (3): 2023, 2025, 2026
- All-Ireland Freshers' Hurling Championship: 2022

Limerick

- All-Ireland Senior Hurling Championship (4): 2021, 2022, 2023, 2026
- Munster Senior Hurling Championship (5): 2021, 2022, 2023, 2024, 2026
- National Hurling League (2): 2023, 2026
- Munster Minor Hurling Championship (1): 2019 (c)

Individual

- All-Ireland Senior Hurling Championship Final Man of the Match (1): 2026
- All-Star Award: 2026

Sporting positions
Preceded by Kyran O'Donnell	Limerick minor hurling team captain 2019	Succeeded by Adam English
Awards
Preceded by Ronan Maher	All-Ireland SHC Final; Man of the Match; 2026	Succeeded by Incumbent
