= Ger Galvin =

Irish hurler (born 1969)

Personal information
- Native name: Gearóid Ó Gealbháin (Irish)
- Born: 1969 (age 56–57) Feenagh, County Limerick, Ireland

Sport
- Sport: Hurling
- Position: Left wing-forward
Club
- Years: Club
- Feenagh–Kilmeedy
Club titles
- Limerick titles: 0
Inter-county
- Years: County
- 1993-1994: Limerick
Inter-county titles
- Munster titles: 1
- All-Irelands: 0
- NHL: 0
- All Stars: 0

Ger Galvin (born 1969) is an Irish former hurler. At club level he played with Feenagh–Kilmeedy and also lined out at inter-county level with various Limerick teams.

== Career ==
Born in Feenagh, County Limerick, Galvin first played hurling at juvenile and underage levels with the Feenagh–Kilmeedy club. After progressing to adult level, he won a Limerick JAHC title in 1989 after a 4–10 to 1–07 win over Dromcollogher/Broadford in the final. Galvin claimed a second Limerick JAHC medal in 2003.

Galvin never played minor hurling with Limerick but first appeared on the inter-county scene with the under-21 team. He was drafted into the senior team in October 1993. Galvin won a Munster SHC medal and was a non-playing substitute for Limerick's defeat by Offaly in the 1994 All-Ireland final.

== Honours ==
Feenagh–Kilmeedy

- Limerick Junior A Hurling Championship: 1989, 2003

Limerick

- Munster Senior Hurling Championship: 1994
