= 2024 Limerick Premier Junior A Hurling Championship =

- Dates: 1 August – 26 October 2024
- Teams: 12
- Sponsor: Woodlands House Hotel
- Champions: Feenagh–Kilmeedy (1st title); Maurice Fitzgibbon (captain)
- Runners-up: St Patrick's; Diarmuid Hegarty (captain)
- Relegated: Old Christians

Tournament statistics
- Matches played: 36
- Goals scored: 117 (3.25 per match)
- Points scored: 1303 (36.19 per match)

The 2024 Limerick Premier Junior A Hurling Championship was the inaugural staging of the Limerick Premier Junior A Hurling Championship. The draw for the group stage placings took place on 8 February 2024. The championship ran from 1 August to 26 October 2024.

The final was played on 26 October 2024 at Seán Finn Park in Rathkeale, between Feenagh–Kilmeedy and St Patrick's, in what was their first ever meeting in the final. Feenagh–Kilmeedy won the match by 3–16 to 2–16 to claim their first ever championship title.

== Group 1 ==
=== Group 1 table ===
Semi-finalists Quarter-finalists Relegation playoff

Team	Matches				Score			Pts
Team	Pld	W	D	L	For	Against	Diff	Pts
Feenagh–Kilmeedy	5	5	0	0	139	81	58	10
Dromcollogher/Broadford	5	3	0	2	108	143	-35	6
Caherline	5	3	0	2	119	116	3	6
Tournafulla	5	2	0	3	115	115	0	4
Monagea	5	2	0	3	130	121	9	4
AK Desmonds	5	0	0	5	93	128	-35	0

== Group 2 ==
=== Group 2 table ===
Semi-finalists Quarter-finalists Relegation playoff

Team	Matches				Score			Pts
Team	Pld	W	D	L	For	Against	Diff	Pts
Kilteely–Dromkeen	5	4	0	1	136	102	34	8
Knockaderry	5	4	0	1	138	107	31	8
St Patrick's	5	2	1	2	138	107	31	5
Crecora/Manister	5	2	0	3	104	93	11	4
Doon	5	2	0	3	112	122	-10	4
Old Christians	5	1	0	4	97	141	-44	2

== Knockout stage ==
=== Relegation playoff ===
5 October 2024 Relegation playoff	Askeaton–Kilcornan Desmonds	3-19 - 2-12	Old Christians	Ballybrown Grounds

=== Quarter-finals ===
5 October 2024 Quarter-final	Caherline	2-16 - 0-24	Knockaderry	Adare Grounds
		Report

6 October 2024 Quarter-final	Dromcollogher/Broadford	2-16 - 3-16	St Patrick's	Páirc an Chrócaigh
		Report

=== Semi-finals ===
13 October 2024 Semi-final	Feenagh–Kilmeedy	3-24 - 1-10	Knockaderry	Páirc Íde Naofa
		Report

13 October 2024 Semi-final	Kilteely–Dromkeen	1-14 - 3-14	St Patrick's	Bruff Grounds
		Report

=== Final ===
26 October 2024 Final	Feenagh–Kilmeedy	3-16 - 2-16	St Patrick's	Seán Finn Park
	D Coleman (2-8, 1-0 penalty, 0-5 frees), T Galvin 1-3, R O'Connor 0-2, D Boyce, M Fitzgibbon J O'Gorman 0-1 each.	Report	G Hegarty (0-8, 0-5 frees), S Cross 1-3, D Hegarty 0-3, P Reale 1-0, L Chambers 0-2.	Referee: T McGlinchey
