= Jim McCarthy (hurler) =

Irish hurler

Personal information
- Native name: Séamus Mac Carthaigh (Irish)
- Born: 15 December 1917 Feenagh, County Limerick, Ireland
- Died: 12 April 1982 (aged 64) Merrion Road, Dublin, Ireland
- Occupation: Medical doctor
- Height: 5 ft 11 in (180 cm)

Sport
- Sport: Hurling
- Position: Right corner-back
Club
- Years: Club
- Feenagh
Club titles
- Limerick titles: 0
College
- Years: College
- University College Dublin
College titles
- Fitzgibbon titles: 1
Inter-county
- Years: County
- 1935-1943: Limerick
Inter-county titles
- Munster titles: 2
- All-Irelands: 2
- NHL: 3

James McCarthy (15 December 1917 – 12 April 1982) was an Irish hurler and medical doctor. His career included two All-Ireland Championship success with the Limerick senior hurling team.

== Playing career ==
McCarthy first played hurling for the Feenagh junior team as an 11-year-old before gaining further experience as a boarder at Rockwell College. Here he lined out in back-to-back Harty Cup finals in 1934 and 1935 before winning an All-Ireland medal as part of a star-studded Munster Colleges team that also featured Jack Lynch, John Keane and Connie Buckley. As a medical student at University College Dublin, McCarthy was involved in several Fitzgibbon Cup campaigns and claimed a winners' medal in 1941. After lining out at midfield in the early part of his career he switched to being a goalkeeper on the Limerick junior team that won the 1935 All-Ireland Junior Championship. McCarthy's performances at junior level earned at immediate call-up to the Limerick senior team with whom he won National League, Munster and All-Ireland honours in his debut season in 1936. He won a further two National League medals over the course of the following two seasons before winning a Limerick Junior Championship with Feenagh in 1938. McCarthy won a second set of Munster and All-Ireland medals as a full member of the starting fifteen in 1940. He also earned inclusion on the Munster inter-provincial team and won back-to-back Railway Cup medals in 1942 and 1943.

== Honours ==
University College Dublin

- Fitzgibbon Cup (1): 1941

Feenagh

- Limerick Junior Hurling Championship (1): 1938

Limerick

- All-Ireland Senior Hurling Championship (2): 1936 (c), 1940
- Munster Senior Hurling Championship (2): 1936 (c), 1940
- National Hurling League (3): 1935–36, 1936–37, 1937–38
- All-Ireland Junior Hurling Championship (1): 1935
- Munster Junior Hurling Championship (1): 1935

Munster

- Railway Cup (2): 1942, 1943
