= 2026 Limerick Senior Hurling Championship =

Annual hurling competition in Limerick

- Dates: 30 July – 25 October 2026
- Teams: 12
- Sponsor: Whitebox Developments
- Champions: Kilmallock (13th title); Graeme Mulcahy (captain); James Hickey (manager)
- Runners-up: Na Piarsaigh; Jerome Boylan (captain); Shane O'Neill (manager)
- Relegated: Kildimo-Pallaskenry

Tournament statistics
- Matches played: 35
- Goals scored: 110 (3.14 per match)
- Points scored: 1330 (38 per match)
- Top scorer: Adam English (1–71)

The 2026 Limerick Senior Hurling Championship was the 132nd staging of the Limerick Senior Hurling Championship since its establishment by the Limerick County Board in 1887. The draws for the group stage placings took place on 21 January 2026. The championship ran from 30 July to 25 October 2026.

Na Piarsaigh were the defending champions. Kildimo–Pallaskenry's relegation brought an end to six years of top tier hurling for the club.

The final was played on 25 October 2026 at the TUS Gaelic Grounds in Limerick, between Kilmallock and Na Piarsaigh, in what was their fourth meeting overall in the final and a first meeting in four years. Kilmallock won the match by 3–19 to 1–22 to claim their 13th championship title overall and a first title in five years.

Doon's Adam English was the championship's top scorer with 1–71.

== Team changes ==
=== To Championship ===
Promoted from the Limerick Premier Intermediate Hurling Championship

- Garryspillane

=== From Championship ===
Relegated to the Limerick Premier Intermediate Hurling Championship

- Dromin/Athlacca

== Format ==
=== Overview ===
The Limerick County Championship features a group stage followed by a knock-out stage. Each team in the championship is guaranteed at least five games. Relegation also takes place with the Limerick Premier Intermediate Hurling Championship.

=== Group stage ===
For the group stage there are two groups of six teams. Group 1 consists of what are regarded as the "strongest" teams. Group 2 is the "weaker" teams. Teams play the other five teams in the group once, and match points are awarded depending on the result of each game, with teams receiving two points for a win, and one for a draw.

Following the completion of the group stage, the top four-ranking teams in Group 1 and the top two-ranking teams in Group 2 qualify for the knock-out stage of the championship.

=== Knockout stage ===
The two quarter-finals consist of the third and fourth-ranked teams from Group 1 and the top two-ranked teams from Group 2. The winners of the quarter-finals advance to the semi-finals where they join the top two-ranked teams from Group 1 who received a bye to this stage.

== Group 1 ==
=== Group 1 table ===
Semi-finalists Quarter-finalists Relegated

Team	Matches				Score			Pts
Team	Pld	W	D	L	For	Against	Diff	Pts
Kilmallock	5	5	0	0	135	104	31	10
Na Piarsaigh	5	3	1	1	140	109	31	7
Doon	5	2	1	2	134	124	10	5
Monaleen	5	1	1	3	116	131	-15	3
Ballybrown	5	1	1	3	110	128	-18	3
Ahane	5	1	0	4	95	135	-40	2

=== Group 1 results ===
30 July 2026 Round 1	Na Piarsaigh	0-24 - 1-22	Kilmallock	TUS Gaelic Grounds
	K Dempsey 0-10 (7f), R Lynch 0-4 (3f), P Casey 0-3, C Boylan 0-2, D Dempsey, E Brosnan, JJ Carey, E McEvoy and K Downes 0-1 each	Report	M Houlihan 0-7 (7f), P Connery 0-5, S O’Brien 1-1, C Hanley Clarke 0-2 (2f), S Quirke, M O’Loughlin, O Enright, G Mulcahy, P O’Reilly and O O’Reilly 0-1 each.

31 July 2026 Round 1	Doon	2-21 - 2-16	Ballybrown	Childers Road
	A English 0-11 (8f; 2 ’65s); D Coughlan 2-2; D Coleman 0-2; E Richardson, C O’Donovan, D O’Donovan (s/l), P Ryan, C Thomas, G Thomas 0-1 each;	Report	A O’Connor 2-9 (5f); K Gavin 0-3; B Adams 0-2; L O’Connor 0-1.

1 August 2026 Round 1	Ahane	1-23 - 2-18	Monaleen	TUS Gaelic Grounds
	T Morrissey 1-7 (6f); M Donnellan 0-4; C Ryan 0-3; J Cosgrove, J O’Connor and C Barry (1f) 0-2 each; R Fox, G Rowsome and K Morrissey 0-1 each.	Report	S Hassett 0-5 (3f); D Ferland 1-1; E O’Driscoll 1-0; A La Touche Cosgrave 0-3; L McHale and L Lyons (f) 0-2 each; D O Dalaigh, R Lyons, M Fitzgerald and E Maher 0-1 each.

6 August 2026 Round 2	Kilmallock	3-23 - 1-17	Doon	TUS Gaelic Grounds
	M Houlihan 1-9 (1-0 pen, 0-4 f, 0-2 65); S O’Brien 1-4; P Connery 0-4; O O’Reilly 1-1; G Enright 0-2; C Hanley Clarke 0-2 f; C O’Connor, G Mulcahy 0-1 each.	Report	A English 0-10 (0-7 f); C O’Donovan 0-4; Donal Coughlan 1-0; P Ryan 0-2; D Coleman 0-1.

8 August 2026 Round 2	Ballybrown	0-26 - 0-22	Ahane	TUS Gaelic Grounds
	A O’Connor 0-11 (6f); M Gavin 0-5; L O’Connor 0-4; D Hall 0-2; B Adams, R Kenny, J Adams, K Gavin 0-1 each;	Report	T Morrissey 0-11 (8f); R Fox 0-4; C O’Mara, J Cosgrove 0-2 each; G Rowsome, C Ryan, J O’Connor 0-1 each.

8 August 2026 Round 2	Monaleen	2-18 - 4-25	Na Piarsaigh	TUS Gaelic Grounds
	M O’Dwyer 1-2 (1f, 1 ’65); S Hassett 0-5 (4f, 1 ‘65); B Hayes 1-0; D Ferland, D Ó Dálaigh 0-3 each; J Fitzgerald 0-2; L McHale, A La Touche Cosgrave, E O’Driscoll 0-1 each.	Report	E Brosnan 2-2; W Henn 0-8; D Dempsey 1-3; K Dempsey 0-6 (4f); JJ Carey 1-0; R Lynch, E McEvoy, P Casey, J Finn, D Lynch, K Downes 0-1 each;

27 August 2026 Round 3	Na Piarsaigh	3-17 - 0-10	Ahane	Childers Road
	P Casey 0-5; D Dempsey 1-2; R Lynch 0-4 (4f); D Lynch 1-1; K Dempsey 0-3 (2f) E Brosnan 1-0; JJ Carey and J Finn 0-1 each;	Report	T Morrissey 0-4 (2f ‘65); M Donnellan 0-2; C Ryan, J Cosgrave, K Morrissey and J O'Connor (‘65) 0-1 each.

27 August 2026 Round 3	Monaleen	1-24 - 3-17	Doon	Cappamore Grounds
	S Hassett 1-9 (7f, 1 65); L Lyons (1f), D Ferland, D Ó Dálaigh 0-3 each; D Langan 0-2; M O’Dwyer, J Fitzgerald, L McHale, E Maher 0-1 each;	Report	A English 1-5 (4f); D Coleman 1-2; Own goal 1-0; B Murphy 0-3; D Coughlan, P Ryan 0-2 each; J Ryan, D O’Donovan (free), E Richardson 0-1 each.

29 August 2026 Round 3	Kilmallock	5-17 - 0-18	Ballybrown	Newcastle West Grounds
	G Enright 2-1; P O’Reilly 1-3; P Connery 1-2; S O’Brien 1-1; M Houlihan 0-3 (2f); O O’Reilly 0-2; S Quirke, G Mulcahy, C O’Connor, C Staunton and J Dwan 0-1 each;	Report	K Gavin 0-7 (5f); B Adams 0-3 (f, sl); M Kiely and M Gavin 0-2 each; L O’Connor, R Kenny, L Doolan and C Coughlan 0-1 each.

3 September 2026 Round 4	Doon	2-20 - 2-20	Na Piarsaigh	FitzGerald Park
	A English 0-9 (7f); P Ryan 1-3; D Coleman 1-1 (1-0f); Donal Coughlan 0-2; B Murphy, C O’Donovan, J Ryan, D O’Donovan, A O'Connell 0-1 each.	Report	K Dempsey 0-8 (all frees); P Casey 2-1; R Lynch 0-3 (2f); M Casey 0-2; W O’Donoghue, C Boylan, D Lynch, M Foley, E Brosnan, K Downes, 0-1 each

5 September 2026 Round 4	Ballybrown	0-20 - 0-20	Monaleen	Childers Road
	K Gavin 0-5 (5f), M Kiely and L O’Connor 0-3 each, B Adams (1f, 1 s/l) 0-2, J Coughlan, R Kenny, L Doolan, C Coughlan, J Adams, A Cliffe (1f) and B Smith 0-1 each;	Report	S Hassett 0-7 (5f), D Ó Dálaigh 0-6, M O’Dwyer 0-4 (1f, 1 s/l), A La Touche Cosgrave 0-2, D Ferland 0-1.

5 September 2026 Round 4	Ahane	0-20 - 1-21	Kilmallock	Bruff Grounds
	T Morrissey 0-9 (7f); C Barry 0-5 (5f); M Donnellan 0-2; D Morrissey, G Rowesome, J O’Connor and J Cosgrave 0-1 each.	Report	M Houlihan 0-8 (6f, 1 ‘65); A Costello 1-2; C Hanley Clarke (3f) and O O’Reilly 0-3 each; P Connery and C Staunton 0-2 each; P O’Brien 0-1;

17 September 2026 Round 5	Monaleen	1-18 - 0-22	Kilmallock	Knocklong Sportsfield
	L Lyons 0-5 (2f, 1 ‘65); A La Touche Cosgrave 1-1; D O Dalaigh 0-4; S Hassett 0-2 (2f); D Langan, R Lyons, J Fitzgerald, L McHale, M O’Dwyer and D Ferland 0-1 each.	Report	P Connery 0-12 (8f); C Hanley Clarke 0-3 (3f); R Hanley and S O’Brien 0-2 each; G Mulcahy, S Quirke and O O’Reilly 0-1 each;

17 September 2026 Round 5	Na Piarsaigh	2-21 - 2-18	Ballybrown	Brother Rice Field
	D Dempsey and P Casey 1-3 each; K Dempsey 0-5 (3f, 1 ’65); R Lynch 0-4 (4f); T Grimes 0-3; C Boylan 0-1; K Downes 0-1; W Henn 0-1;	Report	K Gavin 0-10 (7f, 2 ’65); L O’Connor 2-0; M Gavin 0-2; L Doolan 0-2; A Cliffe 0-2; R Kenny 0-1; J Coughlan 0-1 (1 ‘65).

17 September 2026 Round 5	Ahane	1-14 - 2-29	Doon	Mick Neville Park
	C Barry 1-1 (1f), T Morrissey 0-4 (2f) and J O’Connor 0-3, J Cosgrove and C O’Mara 0-2 each, G Rowsome and R Fox 0-1 each.	Report	A English 0-14 (8f, 1 ‘65), D Coleman and G Thomas 1-2 each, D Coughlan, E Richardson and S McDonnell 0-2 each, P Ryan, C Thomas, C O’Donovan, D O’Donovan and D Coughlan 0-1 each;

== Group 2 ==
=== Group 2 table ===
Promoted, quarter-finalists Quarter-finalists Relegated

Team	Matches				Score			Pts
Team	Pld	W	D	L	For	Against	Diff	Pts
Mungret/St Paul's	5	5	0	0	129	100	29	10
Adare	5	3	0	2	118	108	10	6
Patrickswell	5	3	0	2	137	110	27	6
Garryspillane	5	2	0	3	103	137	-34	4
Newcastle West	5	2	0	3	106	107	-1	4
Kildimo-Pallaskenry	5	0	0	5	89	120	-31	0

=== Group 2 results ===
30 July 2026 Round 1	Patrickswell	1-21 - 0-20	Newcastle West	FitzGerald Park
	J Gillane 1-9 (7f); C Lynch and J Kirby 0-3 each; P Kirby and D Byrnes 0-2 each; A Gillane and H Maher 0-1 each.	Report	Ethan Hurley 0-8 (5f); Con Hayes 0-4; Cathal Hayes 0-3 (3f); M Dee 0-2; B Nix, M McMahon and Eoin Hurley 0-1 each.

31 July 2026 Round 1	Kildimo-Pallaskenry	4-07 - 0-23	Mungret/St Paul's	Bog Garden
	J O’Keeffe 2-0, R O’Farrell 0-5 (1f, 1 s/l), D Fitzgerald and P Hartigan 1-0 each, C McMahon and C Downes 0-1 each.	Report	L Lynch 0-10 (6f), F Fitzgerald and C Moloney 0-3 each, P O’Brien 0-2, B Duff, K Begley, M O’Brien (1f), R O’Callaghan and N Mulcahy 0-1 each;

1 August 2026 Round 1	Garryspillane	1-14 - 5-23	Adare	TUS Gaelic Grounds
	H Flanagan 0-9 (9f); C Ryan 1-0; B Heavey 0-3; J English 0-2.	Report	J Fitzgibbon 2-5 (1-0 pen, 2f); P Kearney 2-3; W Griffin 0-6 (3f); B O’Connor 1-2; R Connolly and D Gleeson 0-2 each; S Connolly and S Gleeson 0-1 each.

7 August 2026 Round 2	Newcastle West	2-13 - 4-12	Garryspillane	FitzGerald Park
	Con Hayes 1-4, Cathal Hayes 0-4 (2f), B Nix 1-0, Ethan Hurley 0-2 (1f), M Dee, B Foley and B Hurley 0-1 each.	Report	J English 2-0, C Ryan 1-2, H Flanagan 0-5 (2f), P Morrissey 1-1, C Sheehan 0-2, T Ryan and J Morrissey 0-1 each;

7 August 2026 Round 2	Adare	0-20 - 2-12	Kildimo-Pallaskenry	Mick Neville Park
	J Fitzgibbon 0-9 (4f, 3 ‘65s), W Griffin 0-6 (4f), B O’Connor 0-3, D O’Mahoney and W McNamara 0-1 each.	Report	R O’Farrell 1-5 (3f), J O’Keeffe 1-2, P Hartigan 0-2, D Fitzgerald, C McMahon and C McMahon 0-1 each.

8 August 2026 Round 2	Mungret/St Paul's	2-19 - 0-21	Patrickswell	Childers Road
	L Lynch 1-7 (6f, 1 ‘65), P O’Brien 1-1, F Fitzgerald 0-3, R Gleeson and B Duff 0-2 each, R O’Callaghan, M O’Brien, B O’Meara and K Begley 0-1 each;	Report	J Gillane 0-12 (9f), J Kirby 0-4, A Gillane 0-2, P Kirby, C Lynch and H Maher 0-1 each.

27 August 2026 Round 3	Newcastle West	1-21 - 2-11	Kildimo-Pallaskenry	Mick Neville Park
	Cathal Hayes 1-7 (0-7 frees), Con Hayes 0-5, M Dee 0-3, B Nix (1 sideline cut), Ethan Hurley (1 free) 0-2 each, D Lyons, M Quilligan (free) 0-1 each;	Report	S Barry 1-7 (0-6 frees, 1-0 penalty), P Hartigan 1-1, J O'Keeffe 0-3.

28 August 2026 Round 3	Garryspillane	2-18 - 4-23	Patrickswell	Fedamore Grounds
	H Flanagan 1-11 (1-0 penalty, 0-8 frees), D O'Shea 1-1, C Ryan 0-2, J English, C Sheehan, P Morrissey, B Heavey 0-1 each.	Report	J Gillane 3-2 (0-1 free), P Kirby 1-3, A Gillane 0-5, D Byrnes 0-4 (1 '65'), C Lynch 0-3, E Fitzgerald, A Carroll 0-2 each, L Fitzgerald, J Kirby 0-1 each;

28 August 2026 Round 3	Adare	2-16 - 2-20	Mungret/St Paul's	Páirc Uí Riain
	W Griffin 1-5 (0-3f); J Fitzgibbon 1-2 (0-2f); P Kearney 0-3; C Ryan, S Connolly, D Gleeson, S Hickey, D O’Mahoney, S Gleeson 0-1 each.	Report	L Lynch 1-6 (0-1 ‘65, 0-1f); M O’Brien 1-3 (1-0 s/l); F Fitzgerald 0-3; B O’Meara, B Duff 0-2 each; K Begley, N Mulcahy, R Duff, C O’Halloran 0-1 each.

4 September 2026 Round 4	Mungret/St Paul's	3-17 - 0-17	Newcastle West	Mick Neville Park
	L Lynch 1-7 (6f), F Fitzgerald 1-3, M O’Brien 1-1, B Duff 0-2, R Duff, R O’Callaghan, C Moloney, K Begley 0-1 each;	Report	Cathal Hayes 0-9 (7f), Bryan Nix 0-3, Con Hayes 0-2, Ethan Hurley, Brian Foley, Mike Quilligan (1f) 0-1 each.

4 September 2026 Round 4	Kildimo-Pallaskenry	0-16 - 0-17	Garryspillane	Ballyagran Grounds
	S Barry 0-7 (7f); C Staff, P Hartigan, J O’Keeffe 0-2 each; D Fitzgerald, P Nash 0-1 each.	Report	H Flanagan 0-9 (4f, 2 ‘65s); J English 0-3; T Ryan, C Ryan, B Heavey, D O’Shea (1f), C Sheehan 0-1 each;

5 September 2026 Round 4	Patrickswell	1-18 - 2-16	Adare	FitzGerald Park
	D Byrnes 1-3; A Gillane and J Gillane (5f) 0-5 each; C Fitzgerald, E Fitzgerald and P Kirby 0-1 each.	Report	W Grifinn 0-8 (5f); P Kearney 1-3 (1f); S Hickey 1-0; B O’Connor 0-2; D O’Mahony, D Gleeson and M Connolly 0-1 each;

17 September 2026 Round 5	Newcastle West	1-23 - 0-16	Adare	Mick Neville Park
	Ethan Hurley 0-9 (4f); B Foley 1-1; Cathal Hayes (3f) and B Nix 0-4 each; Con Hayes and B Hurley 0-2 each; D Lyons 0-1;	Report	W Griffin 0-5 (4f), P Kearney 0-4; J Fitzgibbon 0-2 (1 65’), M Connelly and R Connolly 0-2 each; S Connelly 0-1.

17 September 2026 Round 5	Garryspillane	2-15 - 2-23	Mungret/St Paul's	Doon Grounds
	H Flanagan 1-9 (6f, 1 ‘65), C Sheehan 1-1, J English and P Morrissey 0-2 each, B Heavey 0-1.	Report	F Fitzgerald 1-3, L Lynch 0-5 (3f), M O’Brien 1-1, B Duff, C O’Halloran and N Mulcahy 0-3 each, C Moloney 0-2, B O’Meara, S Barry and B Barry 0-1 each:

17 September 2026 Round 5	Patrickswell	3-27 - 2-13	Kildimo-Pallaskenry	Drumgoole Park
	J Gillane 0-12 (3f), A Gillane 2-3, K O'Brien 1-2, P Kirby 0-3, A Carroll and D Byrnes 0-2 each, C Lynch, E Fitzgerald and H Maher 0-1 each.	Report	S Barry 1-4 (3f), R O'Farrell 1-3 (1f), S Hartigan 0-4, S Kavanagh, C McMahon and J O'Keefe 0-1 each.

== Knockout stage ==
=== Quarter-finals ===
27 September 2026 Quarter-final	Mungret/St Paul's	1-17 - 0-21	Monaleen	TUS Gaelic Grounds
	B Barry 0-5; K Begley 1-1; L Lynch (2f), B Duff and F Fitzgerald 0-2 each; M O’Brien, C Moloney, R Duff, B O’Meara and R O’Callaghan 0-1 each.	Report	S Hassett 0-9 (7f); D O Dalaigh 0-4; A La Touche Cosgrave and D Ferland 0-2 each; L McHale, R Lyons, M Fitzgerald and L Lyons 0-1 each.

27 September 2026 Quarter-final	Adare	1-14 - 2-27	Doon	TUS Gaelic Grounds
	J Fitzgibbon 1-2 (1-1f); P Kearney 0-5 (3f); R Connolly and W Griffin (1f) 0-2 each; D Gleeson, C Ryan and J Doran 0-1 each.	Report	A English 0-11 (6f); P Ryan 1-4; D Coughlan 1-0; D Coleman 0-3; C O’Donovan and C Thomas 0-2 each; E Stokes, R English, B Murphy, J Ryan and S McDonnell 0-1 each.

=== Semi-finals ===
11 October 2026 Semi-final	Kilmallock	2-19 - 2-17	Monaleen	TUS Gaelic Grounds
	P Connery (1-8, 0-5 frees, 0-1 65); O O’Reilly (1-1); G Mulcahy (0-3); K Hayes (0-2); P O’Reilly, S Quirke, S O’Brien, M O’Loughlin, C Staunton (0-1 each).	Report	A La Touche-Cosgrave (1-1); S Hassett (0-3, frees); E Maher (1-0); D Ó Dalaigh, J Fitzgerald, E O’Driscoll, L Lyons (1 free) (0-2 each); D Langan, L Murphy, B Hayes, R Lyons, D Ferland (0-1 each).

11 October 2026 Semi-final	Na Piarsaigh	2-24 - 3-16	Doon	TUS Gaelic Grounds
	K Dempsey (0-9, 7 frees); K Downes (1-3); E McEvoy (1-1); R Lynch (0-4, frees); D Dempsey, J Finn (0-2 each); C Boylan, P Casey, W O’Donoghue (0-1 each).	Report	A English (0-11, 7 frees, 1 65); D Coleman (2-3); G Thomas (1-0); D O’Donovan, D Coughlan (0-1 each).

=== Final ===
25 October 2026 Final	Kilmallock	3-19 – 1-22	Na Piarsaigh	TUS Gaelic Grounds
	P Connery 0-8 (0-8 frees); S O’Brien 1-2; O O’Reilly 1-0; G Mulcahy 1-1; C Hanley-Clarke (0-2 frees), P O’Reilly 0-2 each; K Hayes, M O’Loughlin, S Quirke, M Houlihan 0-1 each.	Report	P Casey, R Lynch (0-3 frees, 0-2 65s) 0-5 each; C Boylan, K Dempsey (0-3 frees), W Henn (0-3 frees) 0-3 each; W O’Donoghue 1-0; M Foley 0-2, D Dempsey 0-1 each.	Referee: J O'Halloran (Bruree)

== Championship statistics ==
=== Top scorers ===
Overall

Rank	Player	Club	Tally	Total	Matches	Average
1	Adam English	Doon	1–71	74	7	10.57
2	Jason Gillane	Patrickswell	4–40	52	5	10.40
3	Hugh Flanagan	Garryspillane	2–43	49	5	9.80
4	Pierce Connery	Kilmallock	2–41	47	7	6.71
5	Liam Lynch	Mungret/St Paul's	3–37	46	6	7.66
6	Keith Dempsey	Na Piarsaigh	0–44	44	7	6.28
7	Shane Hassett	Monaleen	1–40	43	7	6.14
8	Tom Morrissey	Ahane	1–35	38	5	7.60
9	Willie Griffin	Adare	1–32	35	6	5.83
10	John Fitzgibbon	Adare	4–20	32	6	5.33

In a single game

Rank	Player	Club	Tally	Total	Opposition
1	Aidan O'Connor	Ballybrown	2–09	15	Doon
2	Hugh Flanagan	Garryspillane	1–11	14	Patrickswell
2	Adam English	Doon	0–14	14	Ahane
4	Micheál Houlihan	Kilmallock	1–09	12	Doon
4	Hugh Flanagan	Garryspillane	1–09	12	Mungret/St Paul's
4	Shane Hassett	Monaleen	1–09	12	Doon
4	Jason Gillane	Patrickswell	1–09	12	Newcastle West
4	Jason Gillane	Patrickswell	0–12	12	Mungret/St Paul's
4	Jason Gillane	Patrickswell	0–12	12	Kildimo-Pallaskenry
4	Pierce Connery	Kilmallock	0–12	12	Monaleen
