= Limerick Premier Junior A Hurling Championship =

Annual hurling competition for junior hurling clubs in Limerick

- Current season or competition: 2026 Limerick Premier Junior A Hurling Championship
- Code: Hurling
- Founded: 2024; 2 years ago
- Region: Limerick (GAA)
- No. of teams: 12
- Title holders: Doon (1st title)
- Sponsors: Woodlands House Hotel
- Official website: Official website

The Limerick Premier Junior A Hurling Championship (known for sponsorship reasons as the Woodlands House Hotel Premier Junior A Hurling Championship and abbreviated to the Limerick PJAHC) is an annual hurling competition organised by the Limerick County Board of the Gaelic Athletic Association and contested by the top-ranking junior clubs in the county of Limerick in Ireland. It is the fourth tier overall in the entire Limerick hurling championship system.

The Limerick Premier Junior A Championship was introduced in 2024 following a restructuring of the existing junior championship.

The 12 club teams, participating in the competition, are divided into two groups of six teams and play each other in a round-robin system. The top three teams in each group proceed to the knockout phase that culminates with the final. The winner of the Limerick Premier Junior Championship qualifies for the subsequent Munster Club Championship.

Doon are the current champions, having beaten Caherline by 3–12 to 0–10 in the 2026 final.

== Format ==
=== Group stage ===
The 12 teams are divided into two groups of six. Over the course of the group stage, each team plays once against the others in the group. Two points are awarded for a win, one for a draw and zero for a loss. The teams are ranked in the group stage table by points gained, then scoring difference and then their head-to-head record. The top three teams in each group qualify for the knockout stage.

=== Knockout stage ===
Quarter-finals: Two lone quarter-finals featuring the second and third-placed qualifying teams from the group stage. Two teams qualify for the next round.

Semi-finals: The two quarter-final winners and the two first-placed qualifying teams from the group stage contest this round. The two winners from these games advance to the final.

Final: The two semi-final winners contest the final. The winning team are declared champions.

=== Promotion and relegation ===
At the end of the championship, the winning team is automatically promoted to the Limerick Intermediate Hurling Championship for the following season. The two bottom-ranked teams from the group stage take part in a playoff, with the losing team being relegated to the Limerick Junior A Hurling Championship.

== Teams ==
=== 2026 teams ===
The 12 teams competing in the 2026 Limerick Premier Junior A Hurling Championship are:

Team	Location	Division	Colours	In championship since	Championship titles	Last championship title
Askeaton–Kilcornan Desmonds		West		2024	0	—
Caherline	Caherconlish	East	Blue and white	2024	0	—
Castletown–Ballyagran	Ballyagran	South	Black and gold	2026	0	—
Crecora/Manister	Crecora	City	Green and gold	2024	0	—
Croom	Croom	South	Blue and white	2026	0	—
Doon	Doon	East	Red and white	2024	0	—
Dromcollogher/Broadford	Dromcolliher	West	Black, amber and red	2024	0	—
Kilmallock	Kilmallock	South	Green and white	2025	0	—
Kilteely-Dromkeen	Kilteely-Dromkeen	East		2024	0	—
Monaleen	Castletroy	City	Red and white	2025	0	—
St Patrick's	Rhebogue	City	Green and white	2024	0	—
Tournafulla	Tournafulla	West	Green and white	2024	0	—

== Sponsorship ==
As of 2024, Woodlands House Hotel are the title sponsors of the competition.

== Qualification for subsequent competitions ==
The Limerick Premier Junior A Championship winners qualify for the subsequent Munster Junior Club Hurling Championship.

== List of finals ==
Year	Winners		Runners-up		Venue	#
Year	Club	Score	Club	Score	Venue	#
2026	Doon	3-12	Caherline	0-10	Cappamore	
2025	Knockaderry	0-13	Doon	0-12	Kilmallock	
2024	Feenagh–Kilmeedy	3-16	St Patrick's	2-16	Seán Finn Park	

== See also ==
- Munster Junior Club Hurling Championship
- Limerick Junior A Hurling Championship (Tier 5)
