= Tom Condon (hurler) =

Irish hurler (born 1987)

Personal information
- Native name: Tomás Condún (Irish)
- Born: 9 September 1987 (age 39) Limerick, Ireland
- Occupation: Engineer
- Height: 1.8 m (5 ft 11 in)

Sport
- Sport: Hurling
- Position: Right Corner Back
Club
- Years: Club
- 2004-present: Knockaderry
Club titles
- Limerick titles: 0
College
- Years: College
- Limerick Institute of Technology
College titles
- Fitzgibbon titles: 0
Inter-county*
Years	County	Apps (scores)
2009-2021	Limerick	25 (0-02)
Inter-county titles
- Munster titles: 3
- All-Irelands: 2
- NHL: 2
- All Stars: 0
- *Inter County team apps and scores correct as of 19:25, 28 January 2021.

Tom Condon (born 9 November 1987) is an Irish hurler who plays for Limerick Intermediate Championship club Knockaderry. He is a former player with the Limerick senior hurling team, with whom he usually lines out as a right corner-back.

== Playing career ==
=== Knockaderry ===
Condon joined the Knockaderry club at a young age and played in all grades at juvenile and underage levels before joining the club's top adult team.

=== Limerick ===
==== Minor and under-21 ====
Condon first lined out for Limerick as a member of the minor team during the 2005 Munster Championship. He made his first appearance on 4 May when he lined out at left corner-back in a 2–14 to 1–06 defeat of Tipperary. Condon was again at left corner-back on 26 June when Limerick suffered a 2–18 to 1–12 defeat by Cork in the Munster Championship final. Limerick subsequently qualified for the All-Ireland final on 11 September. Condon was again at left corner-back for the 3–12 to 0–17 defeat by Galway, in what was his last game in the minor grade.

After progressing onto the Limerick under-21 team, Condon was included on the panel for the 2007 Munster Championship. He made his first appearance on 11 July when he lined out at full-back in Limerick's 2–14 to 2–10 defeat by Waterford.

Condon was eligible for the under-21 grade again the following year. On 17 July 2008, he made his last appearance for the team when he lined out at full-back in Limerick's 1–13 to 0–15 defeat by Tipperary in the Munster Championship semi-final.

==== Intermediate ====
Condon was added to the Limerick intermediate team for the 2007 Munster Championship. He made his first appearance on 10 June when he lined out at right corner-back in Limerick's 0–17 to 0–15 defeat of Tipperary. On 7 July, Condon started the Munster Championship final on the bench, however, he was introduced as a substitute in the 5–11 to 1–12 defeat by Waterford.

Condon was retained on the Limerick intermediate team for the 2008 Munster Championship. On 31 July, he won a Munster Championship medal when he lined out at right corner-back in Limerick's 2–16 to 2–12 defeat of Tipperary in the final. Limerick subsequently qualified for the All-Ireland final on 30 August. Condon was again at right corner-back for the 1–16 to 0–13 defeat by Kilkenny.

==== Senior ====
On 8 February 2009, Condon made his first appearance for the Limerick senior team when he lined out at left corner-back in a 3–13 to 1–18 defeat of Clare in the National League. He made his first Munster Championship appearance on 20 June when he came on as a 60th-minute substitute for Mark O'Riordan in a 0–25 to 0–17 defeat by Waterford in a semi-final replay. At the end of a disappointing season, Limerick manager Justin McCarthy dropped several high-profile players from the panel. Over the course of the winter, many more players, including Condon, withdrew from the panel and refused to play while McCarthy and his management team remained in place. The Limerick County Board refused to remove McCarthy and contested the 2010 season with a new group of players.

Condon returned to the panel the following year and made his first appearance under new manager Dónal O'Grady on 6 March 2011 in a 1–25 to 2-11 National League defeat of Down. On 30 April, he was at right corner-back when Limerick defeated Clare by 4–12 to 2–13 to win the Division 2 title. Condon ended the season by being one of three Limerick nominees for an All-Star.

On 14 July 2013, Condon lined out in his first Munster Championship final. He was at left corner-back for Limerick's 0–24 to 0–15 defeat of Cork and a first title in 17 years. Condon ended the season by being nominated for an All-Star.

In July 2018, Condon received a two-match suspension after receiving a red card for jabbing the butt of his hurley into David Reidy's midriff in a 0–26 to 0-15 Munster Championship defeat by Clare. On 19 August, Condon was introduced as a 72nd-minute substitute for Richie English when Limerick won their first All-Ireland title in 45 years after a 3–16 to 2–18 defeat of Galway in the final.

On 31 March 2019, Condon was selected at right corner-back for Limerick's National League final meeting with Waterford at Croke Park. He collected a winners' medal following the 1–24 to 0–19 victory. On 30 June 2019, Condon won his first Munster Championship medal in six years when he was a non-playing substitute in Limerick's 2–26 to 2–14 defeat of Tipperary in the final.

In January 2021, Condon announced his retirement form inter-county hurling.

=== Munster ===
Condon was first selected for the Munster inter-provincial team for the 2012 Inter-provincial Championship. He made his first appearance on 19 February when he lined out at left corner-back in a 3–14 to 1–16 defeat by Leinster in the semi-final.

Condon was selected for the Munster team again the following year. On 3 March 2013, he won a Railway Cup medal when he lined out at full-back in Munster's 1–22 to 0–15 defeat of Connacht in the final.

For the third year in succession, Condon was selected for the Munster team. On 9 February 2014, he was at right corner-back when Munster suffered a 1–18 to 0–16 defeat by an all-Galway Connacht side in the semi-final.

After a one-year hiatus to the competition, Condon was back on the Munster panel for the 2016 Championship. On 15 December he was an unused substitute when Munster defeated Leinster by 2–20 to 2–16 to win the Railway Cup.

== Personal life ==
Condon is married to Limerick camogie player Sarah Carey.

== Career statistics ==
As of match played 13 December 2020.

Team	Year	National League			Munster		All-Ireland		Total	
Team	Year	Division	Apps	Score	Apps	Score	Apps	Score	Apps	Score
Limerick	2009	Division 1	5	0-00	1	0-00	1	0-00	7	0-00
Limerick	2010	Division 1	—		—		—		—	
Limerick	2011	Division 2	6	0-01	1	0-00	3	0-01	10	0-02
Limerick	2012	Division 2	6	0-00	1	0-00	4	0-00	11	0-00
Limerick	2013	Division 2	4	0-00	2	0-00	1	0-00	7	0-00
Limerick	2014	Division 2	6	0-02	2	0-00	1	0-00	9	0-02
Limerick	2015	Division 2	2	0-04	2	0-01	1	0-00	5	0-05
Limerick	2016	Division 2	6	0-01	1	0-00	2	0-00	9	0-01
Limerick	2017	Division 2	1	0-00	0	0-00	0	0-00	1	0-00
Limerick	2018	Division 2	2	0-00	1	0-00	1	0-00	4	0-00
Limerick	2019	Division 1A	8	0-01	0	0-00	0	0-00	8	0-01
Limerick	2020	Division 1A	2	0-00	0	0-00	0	0-00	2	0-00
Career total			48	0-09	11	0-01	14	0-01	73	0-11

== Honours ==
Limerick

- All-Ireland Senior Hurling Championship (2): 2018, 2020
- Munster Senior Hurling Championship (2): 2019, 2020
- National Hurling League (2): 2019, 2020
- National Hurling League Division 2 (1): 2011
- Munster Senior Hurling League (2): 2018, 2020
- Waterford Crystal Cup (1): 2015
- Munster Intermediate Hurling Championship (1): 2008

Munster

- Railway Cup (2): 2013, 2016
