= Nollaig Ó Gadhra =

Irish activist, historian, and journalist (1943–2008)

- Born: 16 December 1943; Feenagh, County Limerick, Ireland
- Died: 13 August 2008 (aged 64); Furbo, County Galway, Ireland
- Education: University College Cork

Nollaig Ó Gadhra (Irish pronunciation: [ˈn̪ˠɔl̪ˠəɟ oː ˈɡəiɾˠə]; 16 December 1943 – 13 August 2008) was an Irish-language activist, journalist and historian in Ireland. He was president of Conradh na Gaeilge from 2004 to 2005. He was also a founding member of Teilifís na Gaeilge.

== Early life ==
Ó Gadhra was born on a family farm in Feenagh, County Limerick in 1943. His parents had returned to Ireland from the United States. He attended the Feenagh primary school before enrolling at the Scoil Mhuire secondary school in Dromcollogher and De La Salle residential school in Waterford.

Ó Gadhra studied at University College Cork, where he graduated with a bachelor's degree in Irish and History in 1966. He also earned a teaching diploma from UCC as well.

== Career ==
Ó Gadhra relocated to Dublin following his graduation where he began reporting as a journalist for both broadcast and print media. He began working for as a reporter for the Irish language publication, Inniu in 1966. He also began working as a presenter and television producer at RTÉ's Irish language current affairs division. He moved to the United States for a few years, settling in Boston, where he briefly attended Harvard University.

He took a position as an information officer with Gaeltarra Éireann from 1970 until 1972. He then left and became a publicity manager for Ireland West Tourism, based in Galway, until 1974. He and his family relocated from Dublin to County Galway during this time period.

In 1974, Ó Gadhra became a lecturer of journalism, Irish language, communications, European studies and modern history at Galway Regional Technical College (now Galway-Mayo Institute of Technology. He continued to lecture at GMIT for the remainder of his career.

He was a founding member of Teilifís na Gaeilge in 1994, an Irish-language television station now known as TG4. He contributed to news and current affairs programs on TG4, including Seacht Lá. His daughter has also presented the show since 2018. Ó Gadhra also continued to work as a correspondent for newspapers and magazines throughout Ireland including the Limerick Leader.

He authored several important academic works, including biographies of Edmund Ignatius Rice, Mahatma Gandhi, Mayor of Chicago Richard J. Daley and John Boyle O'Reilly, many of which were written in Irish. Ó Gadhra's Irish-language biography of Richard Daley is considered to be one of the most thorough and comprehensive biographies ever written in the language, according to his successor as president of Conradh na Gaeilge, Daithí Mac Carthaigh. He also wrote a landmark book on the First Dáil which is regarded by some as an authoritative history on the subject.

For years, he was one of the only authors who contributed works to Irish language literary genre. Much of his journalistic writings, short stories, poems and books were written exclusively in Irish, before later being translated into English.

== Death ==
Ó Gadhra died on 13 August 2008, at the age of 64 at his home in Furbo, in Connemara. His funeral mass was held at Furbo Parish Church. He was survived by his wife, Mairín, and three children.

The Taoiseach Brian Cowen paid tribute to Ó Gadhra saying, "He was a proud Irishman who always stood strong on behalf of Irish culture. He was also an eminent historian who contributed much to our understanding of modern Ireland." Minister for Community, Rural and Gaeltacht Affairs Éamon Ó Cuív also reacted, "I had known Nollaig for many years, was in regular contact with him. He was always ready to share his knowledge and his ideas."

A book was launched in his memory in late 2017 by his eldest daughter.
