= Hugh Flanagan =

Irish hurler

Personal information
- Native name: Aodh Ó Flanagáin (Irish)
- Born: 2006 (age 19–20) Knocklong, County Limerick, Ireland
- Occupation: Student

Sport
- Sport: Hurling
- Position: Left corner-forward
Club
Years	Club	Apps (scores)
2024-present	Garryspillane	17 (11-108)
Club titles
- Limerick titles: 0
College
- Years: College
- 2025-present: University of Limerick
College titles
- Fitzgibbon titles: 0
Inter-county*
Years	County	Apps (scores)
2024-present	Limerick	1 (0-00)
Inter-county titles
- Munster titles: 0
- All-Irelands: 0
- NHL: 0
- All Stars: 0
- *Inter County team apps and scores correct as of 21:10, 03 May 2026.

Hugh Flanagan (born 2006) is an Irish hurler. At club level he plays with Garryspillane and at inter-county level with the Limerick senior hurling team.

== Career ==
Flanagan played hurling at all grades during his time as a student at John the Baptist Community School in Hospital, including in the Dr Harty Cup. He later attended the University of Limerick and won a Freshers' Hurling League title in 2025. At club level, Flanagan was top scorer when Garryspillane won the Limerick PIHC title in 2025.

At inter-county level, Flanagan first appeared for Limerick as part of the minor team in 2023. He immediately progressed to the under-20 team. Flanagan was added to the senior team's pre-season training panel in November 2024. He was listed amongst the substitutes for Limerick's game against Tipperary in the 2025 National Hurling League.

== Career statistics ==
=== Club ===
As of 1 November 2025

Team	Year	Limerick PIHC		Munster		All-Ireland		Total	
Team	Year	Apps	Score	Apps	Score	Apps	Score	Apps	Score
Garryspillane	2024	8	3-39	—		—		8	3-39
Garryspillane	2025	8	5-58	1	3-11	—		9	8-69
Garryspillane	Total	16	8-97	1	3-11	—		17	11-108
Garryspillane	Year	Limerick SHC		Munster		All-Ireland		Total	
Garryspillane	Year	Apps	Score	Apps	Score	Apps	Score	Apps	Score
Garryspillane	2026	0	0-00	—		—		0	0-00
Garryspillane	Total	0	0-00	—		—		0	0-00
Career total		16	8-97	1	3-11	—		17	11-108

=== Inter-county ===
As of 21 March 2026

Team	Year	National League			Munster		All-Ireland		Total	
Team	Year	Division	Apps	Score	Apps	Score	Apps	Score	Apps	Score
Limerick	2025	Division 1A	0	0-00	0	0-00	0	0-00	0	0-00
Limerick	2026	Division 1A	4	0-01	1	0-00	0	0-00	5	0-01
Career total			4	0-01	1	0-00	0	0-00	5	0-01

== Honours ==
University of Limerick

- Freshers' Hurling League: 2025

Garryspillane

- Limerick Premier Intermediate Hurling Championship: 2025
