= Limerick Intermediate Hurling Championship =

- Irish: Craobh Idirmhéanach Iománaíochta Luimní
- Founded: 1910
- Trophy: Mike O'Leary Cup
- Title holders: Knockaderry (1st title)
- Most titles: Dromin-Athlacca (5 titles)

The Limerick Intermediate Hurling Championship is an annual hurling competition organised by the Limerick County Board of the Gaelic Athletic Association for the third tier hurling teams in County Limerick, Ireland.

The series of games are played during the summer and autumn months with the county final played in a variety of venues, normally in October. The championship includes a group stage which is followed by a knock-out phase for the three top teams in each group. There is also promotion involving the Limerick Premier Intermediate Hurling Championship.

The winners of the Limerick county final don't proceed to Munster competition anymore. Limerick's representative in the Munster Intermediate grade comes from the Premier Intermediate Championship.

== History ==
The original intermediate championship dates back to 1910. It was the third hurling championship to be established in Limerick, and was seen as a stepping stone between the senior and junior hurling championships. Three separate hurling championships proved difficult to sustain, particularly due to a lack of competitive clubs, and the newly formed intermediate championship was not staged in 1913 before being suspended in 1915.

In 1928 an effort was once again made to revive the intermediate grade, however, after just two completed seasons the grade was once again suspended in 1930 in favour of a two-tier senior and junior championship.

After an absence of nearly half a century the intermediate championship was reorganised again in 1975, however, it survived only three seasons before being abolished for the third time in its history.

By 1988 the gap between the senior and junior grades proved too great and the intermediate championship was introduced once again. It has remained a staple of the hurling calendar since then, however, it has undergone some major changes. Originally played as a straight knock-out championship, the competition was eventually expanded to feature a group stage which provided more games.

In 2013 the intermediate championship was relegated to being the third most important championship in Limerick as a new premier intermediate grade was established. Because of this the number of participating clubs was reduced from sixteen to twelve.

== Teams ==
=== 2026 Teams ===
Club	Location	Division	Colours	In championship since	Championship titles	Last championship title
Bruree	Bruree	South	Blue and white	2021	0	—
Cappamore	Cappamore	East	Green and gold	2024	1	2015
Feenagh–Kilmeedy	Feenagh	West	Blue and white	2025	1 (as Kilmeedy)	1928
Feohanagh-Castlemahon	Mahoonagh	West	Blue and white	?	1	1988
Hospital-Herbertstown	Hospital	South	Maroon and black	?	3	2010
Knockaderry	Knockaderry	West	Green and white	2026	0	—
Knockainey	Knockainey	South	Black and white	2023	1	2001
Mungret/St. Paul's	Mungret	City	Red and white	?	2	2016
Na Piarsaigh	Caherdavin	City	Sky blue and white	2025	2	2022
Pallasgreen	Pallasgreen	East	Blue and gold	?	3	2014
South Liberties	Roxboro	East	Green and gold	2026	2	2009
St Kieran's	Coolcappagh	West	Green and yellow	?	0	—

== Roll of honour ==
=== By club ===
#	Club	Titles	Championships won
1	Dromin-Athlacca	5	1977, 2004, 2007, 2013, 2018
2	Pallasgreen	3	1995, 2003, 2014
2	Hospital-Herbertstown	3	1929, 2000, 2010
4	Na Piarsaigh	2	1994, 2022
4	Murroe-Boher	2	1999, 2025
4	Bruff	2	1989, 2008
4	Garryspillane	2	1990, 1996
4	Mungret	2	1975, 2016
4	South Liberties	2	1911, 2009
4	Effin	2	2011, 2021
4	Granagh-Ballingarry	2	2005, 2023
12	Cappamore	1	2015
12	Ballybrown	1	2012
12	Claughaun	1	2006
12	Tournafulla	1	2003
12	Knockainey	1	2001
12	Croom	1	1998
12	Monaleen	1	1997
12	Blackrock	1	1993
12	Killeedy	1	1992
12	Old Christians	1	1991
12	Feohanagh-Castlemahon	1	1988
12	Fedamore	1	1976
12	Kilmeedy	1	1928
12	Murroe	1	1914
12	Ballybrickin	1	1912
12	Ballingarry	1	1910
12	Kildimo/Pallaskenry	1	2019
12	Glenroe	1	2017
12	Newcastle West	1	2020
12	Croagh-Kilfinny	1	2024
12	Knockaderry	1	2026

== List of finals ==
=== List of Limerick IHC finals ===
Year	Winners		Runners-up		Venue	#
Year	Club	Score	Club	Score	Venue	#
2026	Knockaderry	1-16	Bruree	0-17	Mick Neville Park	
2025	Murroe-Boher	2-22	Bruree	1-13	Fedamore	
2024	Croagh-Kilfinny	0-18	Bruree	1-14	Mick Neville Park	
2023	Granagh-Ballingarry	0-18	Croagh-Kilfinny	1-13	Paddy Carroll Park	
2022	Na Piarsaigh	1-19	Croagh-Kilfinny	0-14	Paddy Carroll Park	
2021	Effin	0-22	Croagh-Kilfinny	0-15	Newcastle West	
2020	Newcastle West	1-24	Na Piarsaigh	1-22	LIT Gaelic Grounds	
2019	Glenroe	1-13	Newcastle West	0-10	Fitzgerald Park, Kilmallock	
2018	Dromin/Athlacca	2-15	Croom	0-14	Gaelic Grounds	
2017	Kildimo/Pallaskenry	2-13	Glenroe	0-09	Fitzgerald Park, Kilmallock	
2016	Mungret/St. Paul's	0-17	Pallasgreen	0-10	Fitzgerald Park, Kilmallock	
2015	Cappamore	2-18	Feohanagh-Castlemahon	2-12	Fitzgerald Park, Kilmallock	
2014	Pallasgreen	0-11	Monaleen	0-08	Bruff	
2013	Dromin/Athlacca	2-18	Knockaderry	1-15	Gaelic Grounds	
2012	Ballybrown	1-15	Dromin/Athlacca	0-10	Fitzgerald Park, Kilmallock	
2011	Effin	1-09	Ballybrown	1-08	Gaelic Grounds	
2010	Hospital-Herbertstown	2-11	Dromin/Athlacca	0-15	Bruff	
2009	South Liberties	2-14	Ballybrown	1-15	Gaelic Grounds	
2008	Bruff	3-14	Caherline	0-15	Paddy Carroll Park	
2007	Dromin/Athlacca	0-19	South Liberties	0-08	Gaelic Grounds	
2006	Claughaun	1-17	South Liberties	2-09	Fitzgerald Park, Kilmallock	
2005	Granagh/Ballingarry	4-10	Glenroe	3-10	Fitzgerald Park, Kilmallock	
2004	Dromin/Athlacca	0-12 1-09 (R)	South Liberties	1-09 1-05 (R)	Bruff	
2003	Tournafulla		South Liberties			
2002	Pallasgreen	2-14	Dromin/Athlacca	2-04		
2001	Knockainey	2-13	Mungret/St. Paul's	1-09		
2000	Hospital-Herbertstown	2-11	South Liberties	1-05		
1999	Murroe/Boher	1-14	Knockainey	1-12		
1998	Croom		Old Christians			
1997	Monaleen					
1996	Garryspillane	0-13 1-10 (R)	Mungret/St. Paul's	2-07 0-11 (R)	Fitzgerald Park, Kilmallock, Bruree (R)	
1995	Pallasgreen	2-07	Ballybricken	0-12	Fitzgerald Park, Kilmallock	
1994	Na Piarsaigh	1-14	Tournafulla	0-04	Fitzgerald Park, Kilmallock	
1993	Blackrock	2-04	Na Piarsaigh	0-08	Fitzgerald Park, Kilmallock	
1992	Killeedy		Boher			
1991	Old Christians					
1990	Garryspillane	1-09 4-13 (R)	Ardagh	1-09 2-07 (R)	Fitzgerald Park, Kilmallock, Gaelic Grounds (R)	
1989	Bruff					
1988	Feohanagh-Castlemahon	3-14	St. Kieran's	4-08	Newcastlewest	
1977	Dromin/Athlacca	1-11	Glenroe	1-06	Fitzgerald Park, Kilmallock	
1976	Fedamore	3-08	Glenroe	1-09	Bruff	
1975	Mungret/St. Paul's	2-13	Glenroe	2-09	Bruff	
1929	Hospital	4-02	Pallasgreen	2-04	Kileely	
1928	Kilmeedy	2-06	Pallasgreen	2-01	Croom	
1914	Murroe	8-04	Newcastle West	6-00		
1912	Ballybricken	4-03	Newcastle West	0-01		
1911	Rathkeale	2-03 3-01 2-01 (2R)	South Liberties	2-03 3-01 2-01 (2R)	Markets Field	
1910	Ballingarry	5-01 8-00 (R)	Ardpatrick	6-02 1-02 (R)	Markets Field	

== See also ==
- Limerick Senior Hurling Championship
- Limerick Premier Intermediate Hurling Championship
- Limerick Premier Junior A Hurling Championship
- Limerick Junior A Hurling Championship
