= Patrick O'Donovan (hurler) =

Irish hurler

Personal information
- Native name: Pádraig Ó Donnabháin (Irish)
- Born: 2003 (age 22–23) Effin, County Limerick, Ireland
- Occupation: Student

Sport
- Sport: Hurling
- Position: Left corner-forward
Club
- Years: Club
- 2021-present: Effin
Club titles
- Limerick titles: 0
College
- Years: College
- University of Limerick
College titles
- Fitzgibbon titles: 0
Inter-county*
Years	County	Apps (scores)
2022-present	Limerick	1 (0-00)
Inter-county titles
- Munster titles: 0
- All-Irelands: 0
- NHL: 0
- All Stars: 0
- *Inter County team apps and scores correct as of 19:12, 25 May 2025.

Patrick O'Donovan (born 2003) is an Irish hurler. He plays with Effin at the club level and lines out with the Limerick senior hurling team at the inter-county level.

== Career ==
O'Donovan first played hurling at juvenile and underage levels with the Effin club. As a schoolboy at CBS Charleville, he lined out in various schools' competitions. O'Donovan eventually progressed to the Effin adult team and won a Limerick IHC medal in his debut season in 2021. He later lined out with University of Limerick in the Fitzgibbon Cup.

O'Donovan first appeared on the inter-county scene with Limerick during a two-year stint with the Limerick minor hurling team. He won consecutive Munster MHC titles in 2019 and 2020. O'Donovan immediately joined the under-20 team, however, a series of injuries impacted on his progress. He was at left corner-forward when Kilkenny beat Limerick in the 2022 All-Ireland under-20 final. His third and final season in the under-20 grade saw him appointed vice-captain.

After being added to the Limerick senior hurling team pre-season training panel, O'Donovan made his Munster Hurling Cup debut in a defeat of Kerry in 2022.

== Honours ==
Effin

- Limerick Intermediate Hurling Championship: 2021

Limerick

- Munster Under-20 Hurling Championship: 2022
- Munster Minor Hurling Championship: 2019, 2020
