= Knockaderry GAA =

Gaelic games club in County Limerick, Ireland

Knockaderry
- Cnoc an Doire
- Founded: 1910
- County: Limerick
- Colours
- Grounds: Knockaderry

Playing kits
Standard colours

Senior Club Championships
	All Ireland	Munster champions	Limerick champions
Hurling:	0	0	0

Knockaderry GAA is a Gaelic Athletic Association club in Knockaderry, County Limerick, Ireland. The club fields teams in both hurling and Gaelic football.

== History ==
Located in the village of Knockaderry in west Limerick, Knockaderry GAA Club was founded in 1910. The club has spent most of its existence operating in the junior grade, winning numerous western divisional titles. Knockaderry made their first county final appearance in 1929 when they were defeated by Claughaun in the Limerick JHC decider in 1929. The club eventually secured senior status after a defeat of Bruff in 1947 secured the Limerick JHC title. It would be over 50 years before Knockaderry claimed a second Limerick JAHC title after a 1–10 to 0–10 defeat of Hospital-Herbertstown in 2004. The club won the Limerick Premier JAHC title in 2025, after a 0–13 to 0–12 win over Doon in the final.

== Honours ==
- Limerick Premier Junior A Hurling Championship (1) 2025
- Limerick Junior A Hurling Championship (2): 1947, 2004
- Limerick Junior B Football Championship (3): 1988, 1999, 2006

== Notable players ==
- Tom Condon: All-Ireland SHC-winner (2018, 2020)
