= Jason Gillane =

Irish hurler

Personal information
- Native name: Iásón Ó Giolláin (Irish)
- Born: 24 March 2000 (age 26) Patrickswell, County Limerick, Ireland
- Occupation: Secondary school teacher

Sport
- Sport: Hurling
- Position: Goalkeeper
Club
- Years: Club
- 2018–present: Patrickswell
Club titles
- Limerick titles: 1
College
- Years: College
- 2018–2024: Mary Immaculate College
College titles
- Fitzgibbon titles: 1
Inter-county*
Years	County	Apps (scores)
2019–2021; 2025–	Limerick	0 (0–00)
Inter-county titles
- Munster titles: 2
- All-Irelands: 2
- NHL: 1
- All Stars: 0
- *Inter County team apps and scores correct as of 20:08, 09 June 2024.

Jason Gillane (born 24 March 2000) is an Irish hurler who plays for Limerick Senior Championship club Patrickswell and at inter-county level with the Limerick senior hurling team. A forward for his club, he usually lines out as a goalkeeper in inter-county competitions. His brother, Aaron Gillane, also plays for Patrickswell and Limerick.

== Career statistics ==
As of match played 02 March 2025.

Team	Year	National League			Munster		All-Ireland		Total	
Team	Year	Division	Apps	Score	Apps	Score	Apps	Score	Apps	Score
Limerick	2020	Division 1A	0	0–00	0	0–00	0	0–00	0	0–00
	2025		2	00–04	0	0–00	0	0–00	2	00–04
Career total			2	00–04	0	0–00	0	0–00	2	00–04

== Honours ==
Ardscoil Rís

- Dr Harty Cup: 2018
- Dean Ryan Cup: 2016

Mary Immaculate College

- Fitzgibbon Cup: 2024

Patrickswell

- Limerick Senior Hurling Championship: 2019

Limerick

- All-Ireland Senior Hurling Championship: 2020, 2021
- Munster Senior Hurling Championship: 2020, 2021
- National Hurling League: 2020
- Munster Senior Hurling League: 2020
