= Feenagh, County Limerick =

Village in County Limerick, Ireland

Feenagh Fíodhnach
- Village
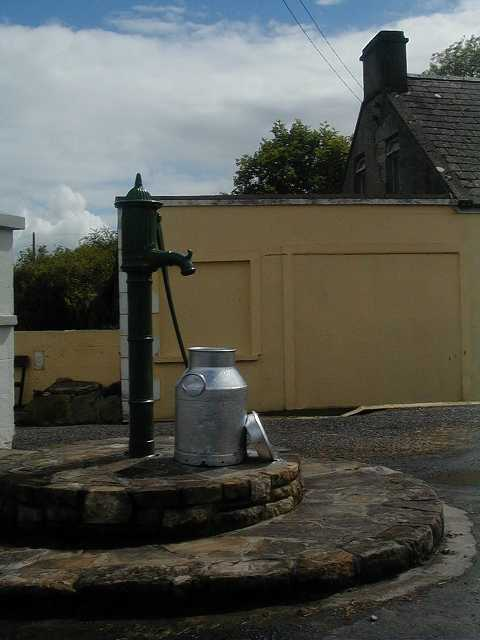
- Former village pump

- Location in Ireland
- Coordinates: 52°23′25″N 08°52′48″W
- Country: Ireland
- Province: Munster
- County: County Limerick
- Time zone: UTC+0 (WET)
  - Summer (DST): UTC-1 (IST (WEST))

Feenagh (Irish: Fíodhnach, meaning 'wooded place') is a village in west County Limerick, Ireland, ten miles from Newcastle West and six miles from Dromcolliher. The village has one shop which is located on the site of the former Royal Irish Constabulary barracks near the old village pump. There is also a butcher shop.

== History ==
Evidence of ancient settlement in the area includes several ring fort sites within Feenagh townland.

The village originated as a settlement in Cloncrew. Feenagh/Kilmeedy became a parish in 1851. Saint Ita's Catholic Church in Feenagh, which originally dates from the 18th century, was substantially rebuilt in 1877. The stained glass window at the altar of the church was donated in memory of Hanora Irwin-McMahon, by her brother David McMahon, in 1907.

Feenagh's former national (primary) school building, built in 1847, is now used as a community centre. A new national school, Scoil Naisiunta Fiodhnach, was built in 1970. The area's Carnegie Library was built in 1917.

The creamery built in the 1890s is now a garage. A new housing estate was built on the site where the village forge once stood.

== People ==
- Nollaig Ó Gadhra (1943–2008), Irish language activist, journalist and historian, was born on his family's farm in Feenagh in 1943.
- Rory Kiely (1934–2018), former Fianna Fáil senator and Cathaoirleach of Seanad Éireann
- Jim McCarthy (1917–1982), hurler with Feenagh–Kilmeedy GAA and the Limerick senior team
- Daniel O'Donovan (fl. 1630–1690), 17th century clan chief

== See also ==
- List of towns and villages in Ireland
