= Crecora =

Village in County Limerick, Ireland

Crecora Craobh Chomhartha
- Village
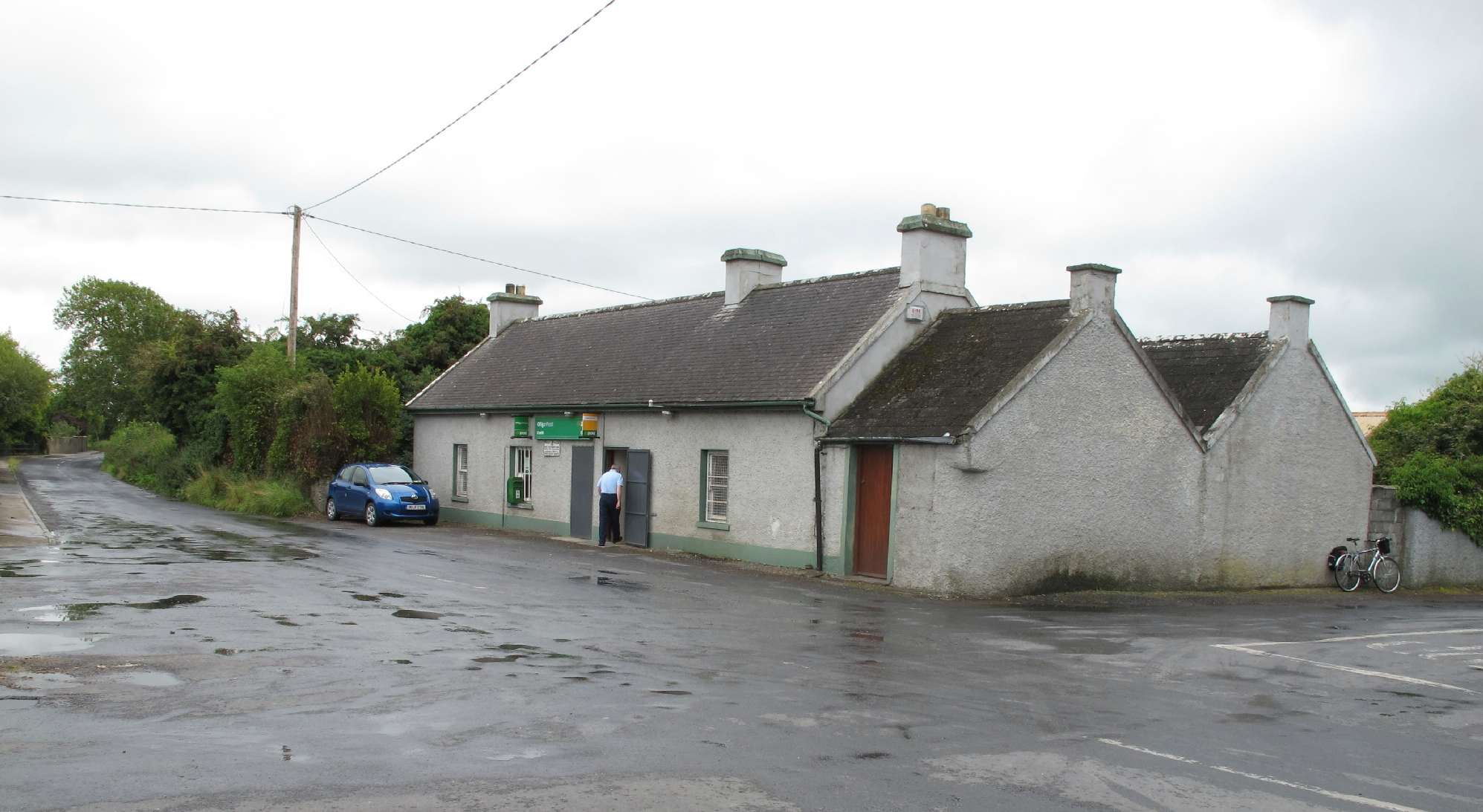
- Crecora post office

- Location in Ireland
- Coordinates: 52°34′29″N 8°40′5″W
- Country: Ireland
- Province: Munster
- County: County Limerick
- Time zone: UTC+0 (WET)
  - Summer (DST): UTC+1 (IST (WEST))
- Irish Grid Reference: R547472

Crecora (/ˈkrɛkoʊrə/; Irish: Craobh Chomhartha, meaning 'tree of (the) sign') is a village in County Limerick, Ireland, 10 kilometres (6 mi) south of Limerick city centre (15 km by road). The village is partly in a civil parish of the same name.

The small village has a school, the club grounds of Crecora/Manister GAA, a post office and a Roman Catholic church. This church, Saints Peter and Paul's church, was built in 1864 and is in the parish of Mungret, Crecora and Raheen within the Roman Catholic Diocese of Limerick.

== See also ==
- List of towns and villages in Ireland
