= Knockaderry =

Village in County Limerick, Ireland

Knockaderry Cnoc an Doire
- Village
- Location in Ireland
- Coordinates: 52°27′53″N 8°57′45″W
- Country: Ireland
- Province: Munster
- County: County Limerick

Population (2016)
  - Total: 513
- (Includes surrounding electoral division/catchment)
- Time zone: UTC+0 (WET)
  - Summer (DST): UTC-1 (IST (WEST))
- Irish Grid Reference: R350350

Knockaderry (Irish: Cnoc an Doire, meaning 'hill of the oak-wood') is a village in County Limerick, Ireland. The population of the Knockaderry electoral division (including the village and surrounding rural catchment) is approximately 500 people.

== Name and location ==
The name Knockaderry derives from the Irish Cnoc an Doire, meaning 'hill of the oak-wood'. There is still an oak grove evident near the village. It is a long single-street village.

The other village in the parish is Cloncagh, originally spelt 'Clouncagh', which comes from the Irish Cluain Cath, meaning 'the meadow of the battle'. During the ministry of Canon Lyons as parish priest, the "u" in Clouncagh was dropped, although it can still be seen on some of the signs entering the parish.

== History ==
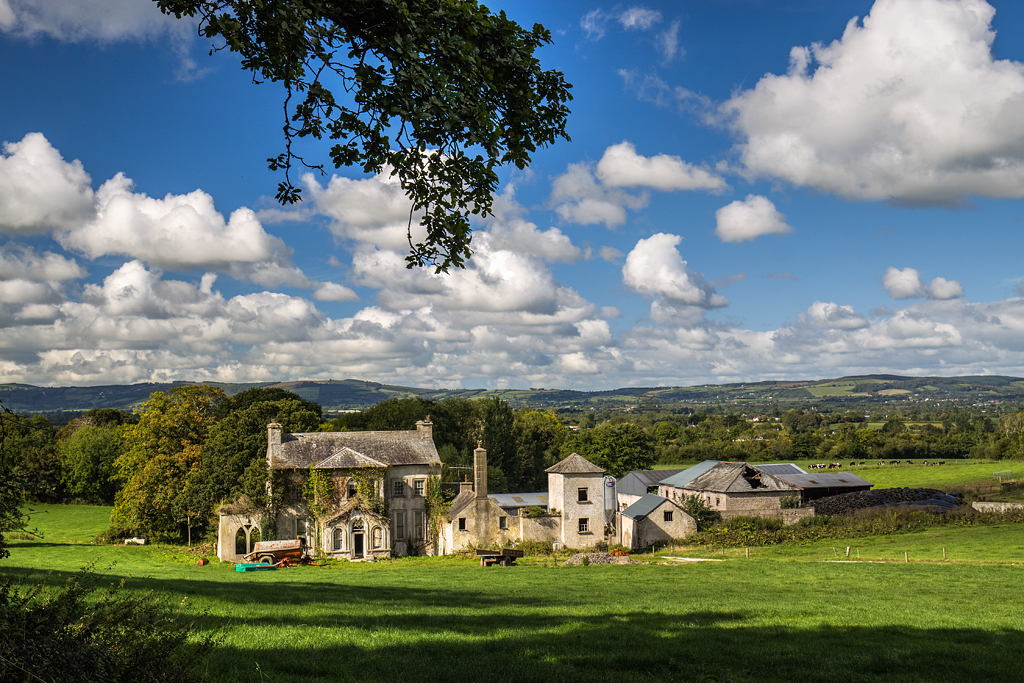
Knockaderry House

Not far from the village is Knockaderry House, the ancient seat of the D'Arcy family.

Reportedly a patent was granted to John Jephson in 1711 for the holding of fairs in Knockaderry.

The village of Knockaderry was burned to the ground in 1789 when, reputedly, a maid "Carelessly left a candle lighting when retiring to rest. This set fire to some straw in the room and the flames spread rapidly to the little street consuming all before it, but fortunately no lives were lost".

There used to be a post office which was previously a police barracks.

There was originally a school, called Scoil Mhuire Achadh Lin, built in a part of Knockaderry before entering it. The present school was built in 1963 with a total 6 staff members.

== Amenities ==
There is one pub called Hanley's Bar. The last Hanleys to own and run the bar were the late Seán and Peig Hanley (brother and sister), who also ran a shop on the premises. Seán Hanley took over the bar from his uncle John Hanley, whose name still sites over the door of the main entrance.

There is also a Gaelic Athletic Association field near the village, where the local hurling, camogie and Gaelic Football teams play. It is located at the end of the cul de sac that begins Hanley's Bar. There's also a soccer club called Knockaderry FC.

There is a community centre in the village, as well as a Roman Catholic church.

Knockaderry also has a drama group that performs in the community centre.

== Neighbouring parishes ==
Rathkeale to the north; Ballingarry/Granagh to the east; Kilmeedy and Mahoonagh to the south; and Newcastle West to the west.

== See also ==
- List of towns and villages in Ireland
