= Crecora/Manister GAA =

Gaelic sports club in County Limerick, Ireland

- CLG Craobh Chumhra/Mainistir
- Founded: 1968
- County: Limerick
- Colours: Green and Gold
- Grounds: Skehanagh, Crecora

Playing kits
Standard colours

Crecora/Manister (Irish: Craobh Chumhra/Mainistir) is a Gaelic Athletic Association club located in the parishes of Crecora and Manister in County Limerick. The club, in its current form, was founded in 1968. The club fields teams in hurling from underage up to Junior A, and in Gaelic football from underage to Intermediate.

== Location ==
The club is situated in the half parish of Crecora and in the parish of Manister in central County Limerick. The parishes are situated roughly 15 km south of Limerick City and are near the larger villages of Patrickswell, Croom . Neighbouring clubs include Mungret St. Paul's, Patrickswell, Croom, Banogue, Camogue Rovers, Fedamore and South Liberties.

== History ==
A club was founded in the Crecora area in 1885. This competed in a number of tournaments at that time. In one tournament in Ballyneety, Crecora lost to South Liberties in the final. There was also a recorded match against Liberties in Ballysheedy in 1895. Manister also had its own club during the latter years of the 19th century. The two clubs went in and out of existence over the first half of the 20th century, and merged with other neighbouring clubs. For example, the Crecora club amalgamated with Mungret for a period, and the Manister club joined with Banogue.

The modern club was established in 1968 and teams initially competed at junior level. While the club did not initially have an underage section, the club started to win underage and minor titles during the late 1990s and early 2000s, including several division two titles at under-14, under-16 and minor grades.

Crecora/Manister won the County Junior B Hurling Championship in 2001 with a win over Ballybricken in the final. They reached the semi-finals of the County Junior A Hurling Championship in 2007, but thus far haven't challenged for promotion to intermediate level. In 2020 the clubs football team won their first ever Junior A County final defeating Monagea by a scoreline of 1-11 to 0-11, sealing promotion to intermediate level for the first time in the clubs history. Due to the small population of the parishes the club amalgamates with neighbouring clubs such as South Liberties GAA with some success.

== Grounds ==
Until the 1980s, the club rented out various fields around the parishes from local farmers for training and matches. In 1988, it located a site about half a kilometre from Crecora village in the townland of Skehanagh in Manister parish. It was blessed and officially opened in 1991 and contained a full sized pitch along with a smaller sized training pitch. Dressing rooms were constructed between 1997 and 1998, and nets and lights were added in 2003. A gym was opened in 2026.

== Honours ==
Hurling

- Limerick County Junior C Hurling Championship (1): 2023
- Limerick County Junior B Hurling Championship (1): 2001
- Limerick City Junior A Hurling Championship (3): 2003, 2004, 2005
- Limerick City U21 B Hurling Championship (1): 2003, 2004, 2005, 2018

Football

- Limerick City Junior B Football Championship (1): 2015
- Limerick County Junior A Football Championship (1): 2020
