= Feenagh–Kilmeedy GAA =

Gaelic sports club in County Limerick, Ireland

Feenagh–Kilmeedy
- Fíodhnach–Cill Míde
- Founded: 1955
- County: Limerick
- Colours: Blue and white
- Grounds: Páirc Caoimhín Ó Luing
- Coordinates: 52°23′35″N 8°53′51″W

Playing kits
Standard colours

Senior Club Championships
| | All Ireland | Munster champions | Limerick champions |
|---|---|---|---|
| Hurling: | 0 | 0 | 1 |

Feenagh–Kilmeedy GAA is a Gaelic Athletic Association club located in the village of Feenagh, County Limerick, Ireland. The club fields teams in both hurling and Gaelic football.

== History ==
Located in the village of Feenagh, on the Cork-Limerick border, Feenagh–Kilmeedy GAA Club was founded in 1955, however, Gaelic games had been played in the area since the foundation of the Gaelic Athletic Association. The club has spent most of its existence operating in the junior grade, winning its first Limerick JHC title in 1962. Promoted to the senior ranks the following year, Feenagh-Kilmeedy won the Limerick SHC title at the first attempt, beating divisional side Emmets in the final by 3-06 to 3-01. The club regraded in 1967 and added further JHC titles in 1989, 2003 and 2013. Feenagh–Kilmeedy's junior football team won Limerick JBFC titles in 2003 and 2013, before claiming the JAFC title in 2021. The club became the inaugural winners of the new Limerick PJAHC title after beating St Patrick's in 2024.

== Honours ==
- Limerick Senior Hurling Championship (1): 1963
- Limerick Premier Junior A Hurling Championship (1): 2024
- Limerick Junior A Hurling Championship (4): 1962, 1989, 2003, 2013
