= 1970 in Ireland =

- Centuries: 18th; 19th; 20th; 21st
- Decades: 1950s; 1960s; 1970s; 1980s; 1990s
- See also: 1970 in Northern Ireland; Other events of 1970; List of years in Ireland

The following events occurred in Ireland in the year 1970.

== Incumbents ==
- President: Éamon de Valera
- Taoiseach: Jack Lynch (FF)
- Tánaiste: Erskine H. Childers (FF)
- Minister for Finance:
  - Charles Haughey (FF) (until 7 May 1970)
  - George Colley (FF) (from 9 May 1970)
- Chief Justice: Cearbhall Ó Dálaigh
- Dáil: 19th
- Seanad: 12th

== Events ==
=== January ===
- 10 January
  - Huge anti-apartheid demonstrations took place as Ireland played South Africa in rugby union.
  - President Éamon de Valera and his wife Sinéad celebrated their 60th wedding anniversary.
- 11 January – The Sinn Féin party split into Provisional and Official wings over a disagreement on abstentionism.

=== February ===
- February – A rock from the surface of the Moon, brought to Earth by the crew of the Apollo 11 mission, was displayed to the public at the United States embassy in Ballsbridge.

=== March ===
- 2 March – Senator Ted Kennedy of the United States began a visit to Ireland by going to see the John F. Kennedy Memorial Park near New Ross in County Wexford, his first visit to the town since 1962.
- 3 March – Ted Kennedy visited Trinity College Dublin for the bicentenary meeting of the university's Historical and Debating Society.
- 29 March – Irish language pirate radio station Saor Raidió Chonamara began broadcasting.

=== April ===
- 3 April – Garda (policeman) Richard Fallon was murdered on duty in Dublin, the first policeman killed in the Republic of Ireland during The Troubles.
- 10 April – The United States Ambassador John Moore visited President De Valera at his home in Áras an Uachtaráin to present him with an Irish flag flown on the Apollo 11 moon landing mission, and a fragment from the lunar surface, as a gift to the people of Ireland from US President Richard Nixon.
- 16 April – Ian Paisley won a by-election to the House of Commons of Northern Ireland.
- 21 April – The Alliance Party was founded in Northern Ireland.
- 22 April – Taoiseach Jack Lynch presented a budget in the absence of the Minister for Finance, Charles Haughey, who was injured in a riding accident.

=== May ===
- 1 May – Workers at the Bank of Ireland, the Allied Irish Banks, the Northern Bank, and the Ulster Bank went on a 6½ month strike, in what would be the largest of the Irish bank strikes of 1966 to 1976.
- 4 May – The Minister for Justice, Mícheál Ó Móráin, resigned from the government citing ill-health. The Taoiseach stated in the Dáil (parliament) on 7 May, "I wish to state that Deputy Ó Moráin's condition is not unassociated with the shock he suffered as a result of the killing of Garda Fallon".
- 6 May – Arms Crisis: The Minister for Finance, Charles Haughey, and the Minister for Agriculture, Neil Blaney, were asked to resign by the Taoiseach. He accused them of an attempted illegal importation of arms for use by the Provisional IRA. Kevin Boland, the Minister for Local Government, resigned in sympathy with them.
- 27 May – Captain James Kelly, Albert Luykx, and John Kelly were arrested and charged with conspiracy to import arms.
- 28 May – Charles Haughey and Neil Blaney appeared in the Bridewell Court in Dublin charged, along with Albert Luykx and Captain James Kelly, with conspiracy to import arms.
- 31 May – The racehorse Arkle was put down at the home of his owner, Anne, Duchess of Westminster.

=== June ===
- 4 June – Kevin Boland was expelled from the Fianna Fáil parliamentary party.
- 25 June – Bishops meeting at Maynooth lifted the ban on Catholic people attending Trinity College Dublin.

=== July ===
- 2 July – Neil Blaney was cleared of arms conspiracy charges.
- 5 July – After a special cabinet meeting the government demanded a ban on all parades in Northern Ireland and the disarming of civilians.

=== August ===
- 2 August – The British Army fired rubber bullets in Belfast for the first time.
- 9 August – The Galway-Aran Islands air service was launched. A return air-fare cost £5.
- 21 August – The Social Democratic and Labour Party was founded in Northern Ireland under the leadership of Gerry Fitt.

=== September ===
- 1 September – The New University of Ulster was presented with a Royal Charter by Elizabeth II.

=== October ===
- 3 October – United States President Richard Nixon and his wife Pat were greeted by Taoiseach Jack Lynch on their arrival in Ireland. In Dublin, an anti-Vietnam War protest took place.
- 4 October – Pat Nixon visited relatives and her ancestral home in County Mayo. Another protest against her husband took place outside the United States embassy in Dublin.
- 5 October – Richard Nixon visited Timahoe in County Kildare. (Note: The hamlet of Timahoe, County Kildare (midway between Lucan and Edenderry), which Nixon visited, should not be confused with the village of Timahoe, County Laois (between Abbeyleix and Stradbally), which is 77 km to the south-southwest, by road. Prior to Nixon's visit, the two Timahoes disputed each other's claim to be his ancestral home.) He dedicated an inscribed stone in the local Quaker cemetery where his maternal ancestors lie buried.
- 14 October – Astronauts Jim Lovell, Jack Swigert, and Fred Haise, recent survivors of the aborted Apollo 13 spaceflight to the moon, landed at Dublin Airport as part of a European tour with wives Marilyn Lovell and Mary Haise (Swigert was unmarried). They were received at Áras an Uachtaráin by President Éamon de Valera on his 88th birthday.
- 23 October – Charles Haughey, James Kelly, Albert Luykx, and John Kelly were acquitted in the Arms Conspiracy Trial.
- 26 October – The Taoiseach was questioned on his return from the United States, and said that there will be no change in fundamental Fianna Fáil party policy regarding Northern Ireland.

=== December ===
- 15 December – Aer Lingus took delivery of its first Boeing 747 Jumbo Jet, the largest aircraft it ever operated. The plane was stored temporarily in Everett in Washington State, USA until it arrived for service in Ireland the following March.

=== Unknown dates ===
- The first Regional Technical Colleges opened, at Carlow, Athlone, Dundalk, Sligo, and Waterford.
- A Magnesite processing plant opened in Ballinacourty in County Waterford.

== Arts and literature ==
- 1 March – The national song contest was held.
- 21 March – "All Kinds of Everything" sung by Dana won the Eurovision Song Contest for Ireland for the first time.
- 1–3 May – The first Oireachtas Rince na Cruinne was held in Dublin.
- 9 November – David Lean's film, Ryan's Daughter, was released. It was filmed largely in Ireland.
- John Banville's short story collection Long Lankin was published.
- Leland Bardwell's first poetry collection The Mad Cyclist was published.
- Christy Brown's autobiographical Down All the Days was published.
- J. G. Farrell's novel Troubles, set during the Irish War of Independence, was published.
- Brian Moore's novel Fergus was published.
- Máirtín Ó Cadhain's first short story collection An tSraith dhá Tógáil was published.
- The Royal Hibernian Academy moved to new premises in Ely Place, Dublin.
- The crossover band Clannad was formed in Gaoth Dobhair, County Donegal.
- The Celtic rock band Horslips was formed in Dublin.

== Sport ==
=== Horse racing ===
- The horse Nijinsky won the Irish Derby

=== Football ===
League of Ireland
Winners: Waterford

FAI Cup
Winners: Bohemian F.C. 0–0, 0–0, 2–1 Sligo Rovers F.C.

=== Gaelic Athletic Association ===
All-Ireland Senior Football Championship
Winners: Kerry 2–19 v 0–18 Meath (played at Croke Park, Dublin)

All-Ireland Senior Hurling Championship
Winners: Cork 6–21 v 5–10 Wexford (played at Croke Park, Dublin)

(This was the first 80 minute All-Ireland Hurling Final)

== Births ==
- 1 January
  - John Moore, film director, producer and writer.
  - Rónán Ó Snodaigh, singer and bodhrán player with Kíla.
- 16 January – Ciarán Carey, Limerick hurler.
- 2 March – Edward Moore, cricketer (died 2021).
- 24 March – Sharon Corr, violinist with The Corrs.
- 27 March – Eleanor Maguire, neuropsychologist.
- 21 April – Glen Hansard, actor and singer-songwriter-guitarist with The Frames (died 2026).
- 10 May – Mick Fitzgerald, National Hunt jockey].
- 27 May – Glenn Quinn, actor (died 2002).
- 29 May – Mary Kingston, television presenter.
- 3 June – Stephen Geoghegan, association football player.
- 6 July – Tony O'Dowd, association football player.
- 13 July – Sharon Horgan, actress and screenwriter (in London).
- 17 July – Siobhán Hoey, triple jumper.
- 24 July – Julia Bradbury, television presenter.
- 31 July – Johnny Pilkington, Offaly hurler.
- 27 August – Jeff Kenna, association football player.
- 18 September – Vinny Arkins, association football player.
- 21 September – Samantha Power, journalist, academic and United States government official (in London).
- 13 October – Rónán Mullen, journalist and senator.
- 11 November – D. J. Carey, Kilkenny hurler.
- 12 November – Bláthnaid Ní Chofaigh, television presenter.
- 3 December – Brendan Kehoe, software developer and author.
- 17 December – Craig Doyle, television presenter.

Full date unknown
- Aidan McArdle, character actor.
- Mark O'Rowe, playwright.
- David Quinn, painter.
- Ruth Turner, Director of Government Relations within Tony Blair's Downing Street office.
- David Wheatley, poet and critic.

== Deaths ==
- 5 January – Cyril Fagan, astrologer (born 1896).
- 6 January – Peter J. Ward, Sinn Féin party (later Cumann na nGaedheal party) Teachta Dála (TD), member First Dáil (born 1891).
- 6 January – David P. Tyndall, businessman (born 1890).
- 28 January – Gerard Sweetman, former Fine Gael party TD and Cabinet minister (born 1908).
- 8 February – Cahir Healy, Nationalist Party member of parliament (MP) (born 1877).
- 11 March – Patrick Lenihan, Fianna Fáil TD (born 1902).
- 21 April – Enid Starkie, literary critic and biographer (born 1897).
- 27 April – Arthur Shields, actor (born 1896).
- 11 July – Bobby Kirk, ice hockey player (born 1910).
- 12 August – Joseph Blowick second leader of Clann na Talmhan party, TD and Cabinet minister (born 1903).
- 14 August – Tommy Henderson, Ulster independent Unionist politician (born 1877).
- 20 September – Leo Rowsome, teacher, player and maker of uilleann pipes (born 1903).
- 25 September – James Ryan, Fianna Fáil TD, member of First Dáil and Cabinet minister (born 1891).
- 29 September – Mark Killilea Snr, Fianna Fáil TD, senator (born 1897).
- 15 October – Liam Ó Buachalla, Cathaoirleach (chairperson) of Seanad Éireann 1951–1954 and 1957–1969 (born 1899).
- 18 October – Máirtín Ó Cadhain, Irish language writer (born 1906).
- 24 December – Tom Farquharson, association football player (born 1900).

== See also ==
- 1970 in Irish television
