= 1974 in Ireland =

- Centuries: 18th; 19th; 20th; 21st
- Decades: 1950s; 1960s; 1970s; 1980s; 1990s
- See also: 1974 in Northern Ireland; Other events of 1974; List of years in Ireland

Events in the year 1974 in Ireland.

== Incumbents ==
- President:
  - Erskine H. Childers (until 17 November 1974)
  - Cearbhall Ó Dálaigh (from 19 December 1974)
- Taoiseach: Liam Cosgrave (FG)
- Tánaiste: Brendan Corish (Lab)
- Minister for Finance: Richie Ryan (FG)
- Chief Justice:
  - William FitzGerald (until 17 October 1974)
  - Tom O'Higgins (from 17 October 1974)
- Dáil: 20th
- Seanad: 13th

== Events ==
=== January ===
- 2 January – The Northern Ireland Executive began its first day in office.

=== February ===
- 15 February – A 600-pound terrorist bomb exploded in Dungannon in Northern Ireland.

=== April ===
- 24 April – The Electricity Supply Board announced that Carnsore Point on the County Wexford coast would be the site of its planned nuclear power station (which, ultimately, was not built).
- 26 April – Nineteen Old Master paintings from the Beit collection were stolen from Russborough House by a Provisional Irish Republican Army (IRA) gang that included English heiress Rose Dugdale.
- Exact date unknown – Fianna Fáil politician Charles Haughey purchased Inishvickillaun island off the coast of County Kerry. Questions were raised concerning Haughey's personal wealth.

=== May ===
- 8 May – The great hall of University College Dublin was to become a 900-seat concert hall and home of the RTÉ Symphony Orchestra.
- 14 May – Northern Ireland ground to a halt as the Ulster Workers' Council called a strike following the defeat of an anti-Sunningdale Agreement motion.
- 17 May – Dublin and Monaghan bombings: Thirty-three civilians were killed and almost 300 wounded in four terrorist car-bomb explosions in Dublin and Monaghan by the Ulster Volunteer Force (UVF), the highest number of casualties in any one day during The Troubles.
- 21 May – The Ulster Workers' Council Strike in Northern Ireland came to an end.
- 28 May – The five-month-old Northern Ireland Executive collapsed.
- Late May – President Erskine Childers paid the first state visit by an Irish head of state to Europe when he visited Belgium with his wife, Rita. This reciprocated the three-day state visit to Ireland by King Baudouin and Queen Fabiola of Belgium in May 1968.

=== June ===
- 14 June – Anatoli Kaplin, the first Soviet Ambassador to Ireland, visited President Childers at Áras an Uachtaráin, the President's residence.

=== July ===
- 9 July – The longest bus strike in Dublin's history came to an end after 65 days (nine weeks). The government agreed to a 20 percent fare increase to persuade CIÉ bus workers to return. City retailers suffered painful revenue losses for the duration and army lorries provided free passenger transport.
- 17 July – The coalition government's Control of Importation, Sale and Manufacture of Contraceptives Bill 1974 was defeated in a vote in Dáil Éireann. The Taoiseach, Liam Cosgrave, was one of seven Fine Gael party TDs who voted against the government's own bill.
- 18 July – The Ladies' Gaelic Football Association was founded in Thurles.
- 20 July – About ten women, styled as the "Dublin City Women's Invasion Force", including journalist Nell McCafferty, politician and activist Nuala Fennell, and poet Mary D'Arcy, entered the Forty Foot bathing place in Sandycove in Dublin, historically a men-only nude bathing area. The women were claiming their right to swim there. From that time forward, women swam at the Forty Foot.

=== September ===
- 1 September – Transition Year was introduced on a pilot basis in three schools.
- 21 September – Leader of the Opposition Jack Lynch said that the Fianna Fáil party would not support any proposal to repeal Articles 2 and 3 of the Constitution.

=== November ===
- 4 November – Powerscourt House in Enniskerry, County Wicklow was destroyed by fire.
- 17 November – President Erskine Childers died suddenly, aged 69, having served less than 17 months of his seven-year term.

=== December ===
- 10 December – Seán MacBride was presented with the Nobel Peace Prize in Oslo "for his efforts to secure and develop human rights throughout the world". The prize was shared with Eisaku Satō, the former prime minister of Japan.
- 19 December – Cearbhall Ó Dálaigh was sworn in as the fifth President of Ireland.
- The first Michelin Guide to cover Ireland was published. The first restaurants awarded stars were The Russell Hotel on St Stephen's Green in Dublin (which closed later in the year) and Arbutus Lodge in Cork.
- December - The Guaranteed Irish symbol was introduced, beginning as a campaign run by the Irish Goods Council.

== Arts and literature ==
- 25 August – The first Kilkenny Arts Festival opened.
- November – The O'Brien Press published its first book.
- 19 December – Tom Murphy's adaptation of The Vicar of Wakefield opened at the Abbey Theatre, Dublin.
- Jennifer Johnston's novel How Many Miles to Babylon? was published.

== Births ==
- 1 January – Eva Birthistle, actress.
- 12 January – Thomas FitzGerald, Earl of Offaly (died 1997).
- 29 January – Niall Blaney, Teachta Dála (TD) representing Donegal North-East.
- 31 March – Victoria Smurfit, actress.
- 4 April – Kieran Collins, "The Golden Drifter", Gaelic footballer.
- 23 May – Maria McCool, singer.
- 17 May – Brídín Brennan, singer.
- 17 May – Andrea Corr, lead vocalist with The Corrs.
- 1 July
  - John Davy, cricketer.
  - Peter Davy, cricketer.
  - Olwyn Enright, Fine Gael TD representing Laois–Offaly.
- 9 July – Gary Kelly, international association football player.
- 10 July – Imelda May, musician.
- 19 July – Malcolm O'Kelly, international rugby player.
- 10 August – Gus Joyce, cricketer.
- 11 September – Karl Gannon, association football player.
- 16 September – John McAdorey, relay sprinter.
- September – Liam Donoghue, Galway hurler.
- 1 October – Keith Duffy, singer and actor.
- 15 October – Barry McCrea, novelist.
- 21 October – Tony Sheridan, association football player.
- 5 November – Gráinne Seoige, television broadcaster.
- 12 November – T. J. Ryan, Limerick hurler.
- 18 November – Graham Coughlan, association football player.
- 22 November – Finian Maynard, four-time speed windsurfing world champion, winner of a world speed record for sailing.
- 24 November – Peter Barry, Kilkenny hurler.
- 27 November – Roy O'Brien, association football player.
- 3 December – Andrew Maxwell, comedian.
- 4 December – Jason Molins, cricketer.
- 7 December – Brendan Kennedy, association football player.
- 8 December – Ian Malone, member of British Army's Irish Guards (shot dead in Iraq 2003).
- 30 December – Camille O'Sullivan, singer (born in London).

Full date unknown
- Alan Browne, Cork hurler.
- Philly Larkin, Kilkenny hurler.
- Fergal McCormack, Cork hurler.

== Deaths ==
- 1 January – Bob Fullam, association football player (born 1897; died in London).
- 4 January – Phelim Calleary, Fianna Fáil TD (born 1895).
- 24 January – Cornelius O'Callaghan, Fianna Fáil senator 1970–1974 (born 1922).
- 15 February – Conel Hugh O'Donel Alexander, cryptanalyst, chess player, and chess writer (born 1909).
- 9 March – Daniel O'Neill, painter (born 1920).
- 19 March – Austin Clarke, poet, playwright and writer (born 1896).
- 10 April – Patricia Collinge, actress and writer (born 1892).
- 28 May – Richard Belton, medical doctor, member of the 12th Seanad (born 1913).
- 3 June – Michael Gaughan, Provisional Irish Republican Army hunger striker (born 1950; died in Parkhurst Prison).
- 10 June – Prince Henry, Duke of Gloucester, member of the British royal family, last surviving knight of the Order of St Patrick (born 1900 in England).
- 30 June – Frank McKelvey, painter (born 1895).
- 5 July – James Young, comedian (born 1918).
- 13 August – Kate O'Brien, novelist (born 1897).
- 9 October – Padraic Fallon, poet (born 1905).
- 17 November – Erskine Childers, Fianna Fáil TD, cabinet minister, and fourth Irish President (born 1905).
- 23 November – Cornelius Ryan, journalist and author (born 1920).
- 1 December – Dick Grace, Kilkenny hurler (born 1890).
- 24 December – Michael F. Kitt, Fianna Fáil TD (born 1914).
- 25 December – Harry Kernoff, painter (born 1900).
- 27 December – Denis Farrelly, Fine Gael TD and senator (born 1912).

Full date unknown
- Liam Deasy, Irish Republican Army officer in the Irish War of Independence and the Irish Civil War (born 1898).

== See also ==
- 1974 in Irish television
