= 1972 in Ireland =

- Centuries: 18th; 19th; 20th; 21st
- Decades: 1950s; 1960s; 1970s; 1980s; 1990s
- See also: 1972 in Northern Ireland; Other events of 1972; List of years in Ireland

Events in the year 1972 in Ireland.

== Incumbents ==
- President: Éamon de Valera
- Taoiseach: Jack Lynch (FF)
- Tánaiste: Erskine H. Childers (FF)
- Minister for Finance: George Colley (FF)
- Chief Justice: Cearbhall Ó Dálaigh
- Dáil: 19th
- Seanad: 12th

== Events ==
=== January ===
- 1 January – The Central Bank of Ireland became the banker of the Government of Ireland in succession to the Bank of Ireland in accordance with the Central Bank Act 1971, completing its transition from a currency board to a fully operating central bank.
- 22 January – Taoiseach, Jack Lynch, and Minister for Foreign Affairs, Patrick Hillery, signed the Treaty of Accession to the European Communities.
- 29 January – The annual broadcasting Jacob's Awards took place in Dublin.
- 30 January – Bloody Sunday: Fourteen unarmed civilians were shot dead in Derry when British soldiers shot at civil rights marchers.
- 31 January – The Taoiseach announced a national day of mourning following the events in Derry the previous day.

=== February ===
- 1 February – Rioting took place in Dublin in reaction to Bloody Sunday. The British Embassy was destroyed by fire.
- 9 February – A day of disruption took place in Northern Ireland as people took to the streets in protest.
- 10 February – The Irish Republican Army (Official IRA) announced a ceasefire.
- 12 February – William Craig launched the Ulster Vanguard movement in Lisburn.
- 19 February – The National Anti-European Economic Community (EEC) Committee organised a march along O'Connell Street in Dublin.
- 26 February – Crowds turned out to see the footballer Pelé and his Brazilian club, Santos FC, play at Dalymount Park in Dublin.

=== March ===
- 30 March – UK Prime Minister Edward Heath dissolved the Parliament of Northern Ireland and imposed Direct Rule over Northern Ireland.

=== April ===
- 2 April – The Irish-language radio channel RTÉ Raidió na Gaeltachta commenced broadcasting.
- 17 April – The government launched its European Economic Community referendum campaign to persuade citizens to join the EEC.

=== May ===
- 5 May – The Regional Technical College, Carlow became the first Regional Technical College to install a computer. It was to be used for business and engineering courses; it used the Fortran and RPG languages and cost IR£10,000.
- 10 May – In the referendum on Ireland's membership of the EEC the poll was almost five-to-one in favour.

=== June ===
- 13 June – The Garda Síochána (police force) celebrated its 50th anniversary.
- 18 June – Staines air disaster: Twelve of Ireland's most senior businessmen travelling to Brussels for talks with the European Commission were among the 118 people killed when British European Airways Flight 548 crashed shortly after take-off near Staines in England.
- 26 June – The Provisional IRA (Provos) announce a ceasefire as prelude to secret talks with the British government.

=== July ===
- July 5 – The Russian composer Dmitri Shostakovich, his third wife Irina Antonovna Supinskaya, and a Soviet security minder, Taval Filatov, began a four-day visit to Dublin by attending a concert in Saint Patrick's Cathedral. The New Irish Chamber Orchestra performed works by Antonio Vivaldi, Benjamin Britten, and by Shostakovich himself.
- July 6 – Shostakovich accepted an honorary doctorate in music at Trinity College Dublin.
- July 7
  - Shostakovich and his party visited President Éamon de Valera at Áras an Uachtaráin.
  - A Provisional IRA delegation led by Seán Mac Stíofáin met secretly regarding The Troubles with members of the British government, led by Secretary of State for Northern Ireland William Whitelaw, in London, but without an outcome.
- July 8 – Dmitri Shostakovich and his party visited the family home of Professor Brian Boydell at Bailey in Howth for conversation, fresh local fish, and croquet. Boydell, who first initiated Shostakovich's visit, was himself a composer and professor of music at Trinity College. The two-hour private conversation between the composers (the minder Filatov being distracted by Boydell's family) ranged from music itself to the position of composers under Soviet political conditions. The Russians presented parting gifts including an autographed score and recording of Shostakovich's Symphony no. 13.
- 12 July – Over 2,000 refugees from Northern Ireland spent the marching season south of the Irish border.
- 19 July – Muhammad Ali beat Alvin Lewis in a technical knockout during the 11th round of a boxing match at Croke Park in Dublin.
- 21 July – Bloody Friday: Nine people were killed and 130 were injured by 20 Provisional Irish Republican Army (IRA) bombs in Belfast city centre.
- 31 July
  - Operation Motorman, 4 am: The British Army began to regain control of the "no-go areas" established by Irish republican paramilitaries in Belfast, Derry (so-called "Free Derry") and Newry.
  - Claudy bombing ("Bloody Monday"), 10 am: Three car bombs in Claudy, County Londonderry, killed nine people. It became public knowledge only in 2010 that a local Catholic priest was an IRA member believed to be involved in the bombings but his role was covered up by the authorities.

=== August ===
- 20 August – Commemorations were held at Béal na Bláth, County Cork, to mark the 50th anniversary of the death of Michael Collins.

=== September ===
- 25 September – The Darlington conference on the future of Northern Ireland opened.

=== November ===
- 19 November – Seán Mac Stíofáin, chief of staff of the Provisional IRA, was arrested in Dublin after giving an interview on RTÉ's This Week radio programme. On 25 November he was sentenced to 6 months' imprisonment by the Republic's Special Criminal Court (during which he staged a hunger strike). Fianna Fáil Minister for Posts and Telegraphs Gerry Collins dismissed the entire RTÉ authority for permitting the broadcast.

=== December ===
- 1 December – Two bombs planted near O'Connell Street in Dublin by Ulster loyalists killed two men, George Bradshaw (30), a bus driver and Thomas Duffy (23), a bus conductor. This intervention averted the threatened political overthrow that night of Liam Cosgrave as leader of the Fine Gael party.
- 13 December – President de Valera signed documents covering Ireland's entry into the EEC.
- 17 December – Police raided premises used by unlicensed station Radio Milinda in Dublin.

== Arts and literature ==
- Hubert Butler's Ten Thousand Saints: A Study in Irish and European Origins was published.
- Seamus Deane's poetry Gradual Wars was published.
- Robert Dudley Edwards' A New History of Ireland was published.
- Poet Seamus Heaney moved from Belfast to work in Dublin and to live in County Wicklow; The Belfast Group of poets dissolved.
- Tom MacIntyre's play Eye Winker-Tom Tinker premièred at the Abbey Theatre in Dublin, directed by Lelia Doolan.
- John Montague's long poem The Rough Field was published.
- William Trevor's collection of stories The Ballroom of Romance was published.
- Gilbert O'Sullivan's song "Alone Again (Naturally)" reached number one in the U.S. singles chart.
- Horslips recorded and released their first album Happy to Meet – Sorry to Part.

== Sports ==
- Olympics (Munich): Competing in the pentathlon, Mary Peters from Belfast became the first Irish woman to win a gold medal at the Olympic Games.

== Births ==
- 15 January – Mark Carroll, runner.
- 17 January – John Byrne, cricketer.
- 21 January – Derek McGrath, association football player.
- 27 January – Keith Wood, former international rugby player.
- 28 January – Peter McDonald, actor.
- 4 February
  - Paul Anthony McDermott, English-born lawyer and academic (d. 2019)
  - Dara Ó Briain, comedian and television presenter.
- 17 February – Fergal Ryan, Cork hurler.
- 21 February – Turtle Bunbury, historian and author.
- 27 February – Jason Byrne, comedian.
- 22 March – Robin Banks, television presenter and radio disc jockey.
- 10 April – Ed Byrne, comedian.
- 17 April – Brian Morrisroe, association football player.
- 20 May – Sharon Foley, athlete.
- 31 May – Karl Geary, actor.
- 16 June – Simon Coveney, Fine Gael party Teachta Dála (TD) representing Cork South-Central and Member of the European Parliament.
- 24 June – Brendan Courtney, comedian and television presenter.
- 2 July – Darren Shan, author.
- 11 July – Cormac Battle, radio disc jockey.
- 4 August – Joe Delaney, snooker player.
- 6 August – Jason O'Mara, actor.
- 12 August – Mark Kinsella, association football player and coach.
- 15 August – Mikey Graham, singer.
- 18 August – Barry Egan, Cork hurler.
- 4 September – Willie Burke, association football player.
- 8 September – Phil Laak, professional poker player.
- 25 September – Emma Hannigan, author (d. 2018)
- 9 October – John Carthy, shot dead in controversial circumstances in 2000 by the Garda Síochána after a 25-hour siege at his home.
- 12 October – Yvonne McGuinness, visual artist
- 15 October – Gary Murphy, golfer.
- 1 December – David Higgins, golfer.
- 6 December – Seán Sherlock, Labour Party TD for Cork East.
- 14 December – Jason Barry, actor.
- 15 December – Stuart Townsend, actor.
- 30 December – Paul Keegan, association football player.

Full date unknown
- Duncan Campbell, video artist
- John Carney, film and television writer and director.
- Andy Comerford, Kilkenny hurler, manager.
- Arlene Hunt, novelist.
- Mark Landers, Cork hurler.
- Kevin Murray, Cork hurler.
- Jamesie O'Connor, Clare hurler.
- Joe Quaid, Limerick hurler.

== Deaths ==
- 11 January – Padraic Colum, poet, novelist, and dramatist (born 1881).
- 18 January – Harry Colley, Fianna Fáil TD, Seanad member (born 1891).
- 22 February – Eva McGown, Official Hostess of Fairbanks and Honorary Hostess of Alaska (born 1883).
- 26 April – Mark Deering, Fine Gael TD (born 1900).
- 22 May – Cecil Day-Lewis, poet and writer, British Poet Laureate from 1967 to 1972, (born 1904).
- 31 May – Alexander McCabe, Sinn Féin party member of parliament, member of First Dáil, Cumann na nGaedheal party TD (born 1886).
- c. June – Winifred Mary Letts, writer (born 1882 in England).
- 19 June – John Blowick, co-founder St Columban's Foreign Mission Society (born 1888).
- 1 September – Patricia Lynch, children's writer (born c.1894).
- 29 September – Kathleen Clarke, widow of Republican leader Tom Clarke, Sinn Féin party member and later a Fianna Fáil TD, Seanad member, first female Lord Mayor of Dublin (born 1878).
- 11 October – Wattie Dunphy, Kilkenny hurler (b. c1895).
- 10 November – Charles Cuffe, cricketer (born 1914).

== See also ==
- 1972 in Irish television
