= Economic history of the Republic of Ireland =

The Irish pound (Punt) served as the Republic's currency from 1979 until 2002.

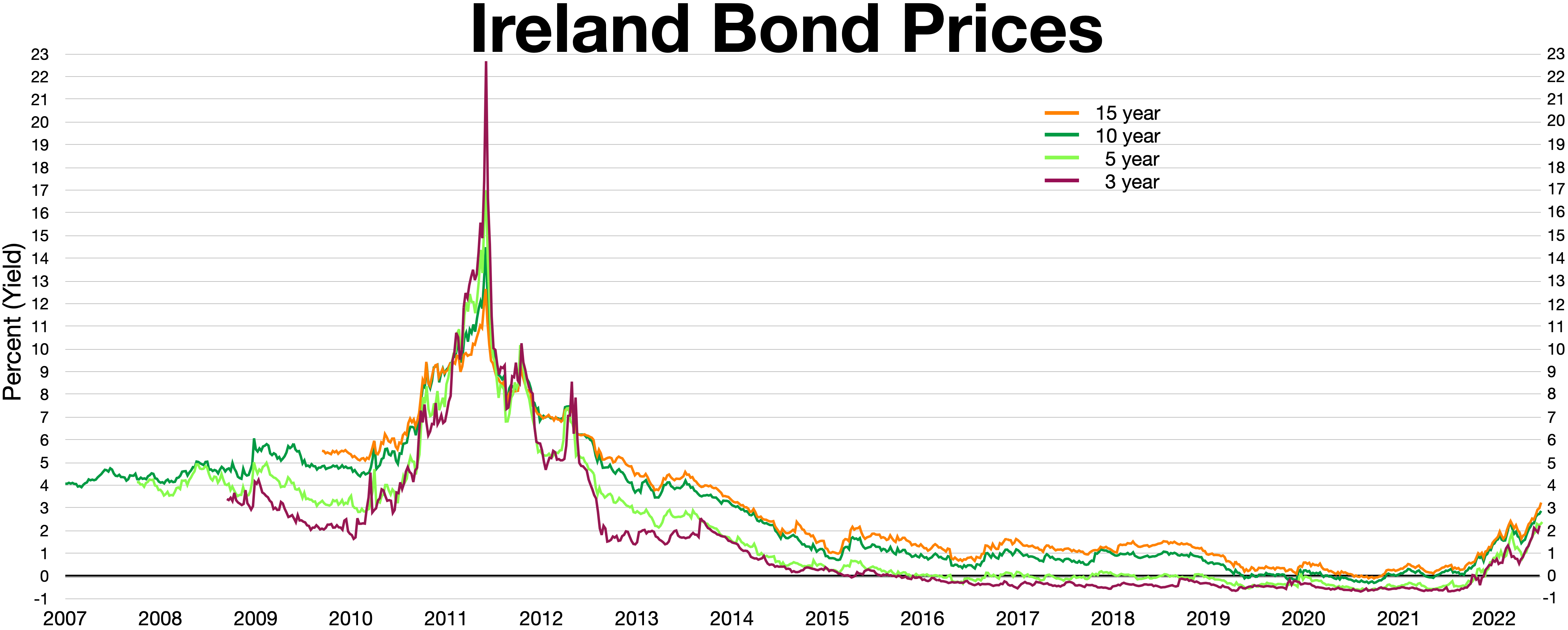
Ireland bond prices, Inverted yield curve in 2011 15 year bond 10 year bond 5 year bond 3 year bond

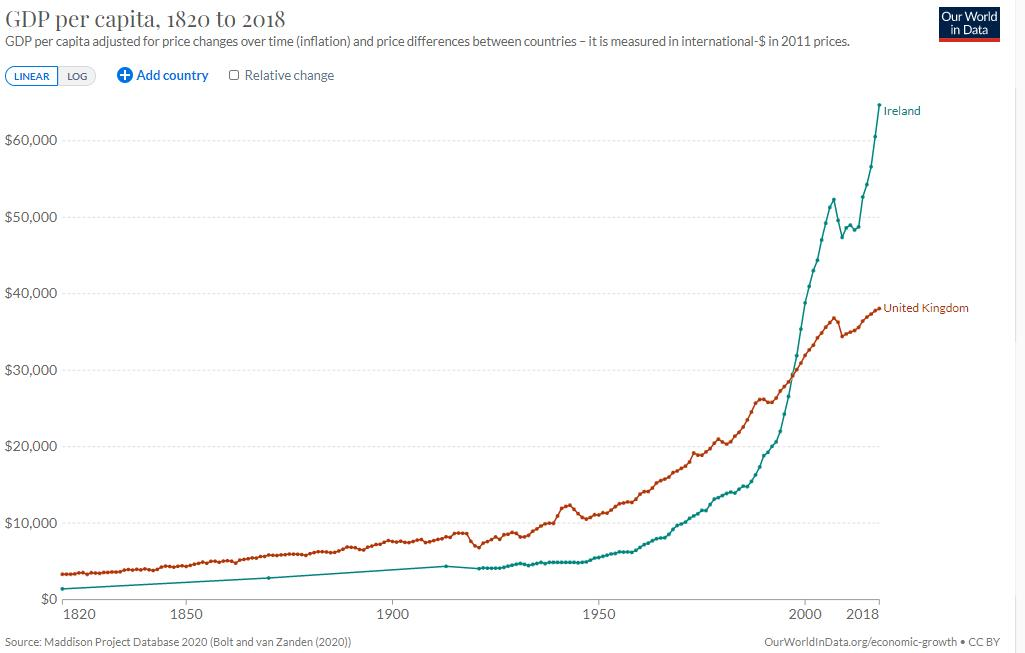
Historical GDP per capita development of Ireland and the UK

The economic history of the Republic of Ireland effectively began in 1922, when the then Irish Free State won independence from the United Kingdom. The state was plagued by poverty and emigration until the 1960s when an upturn led to the reversal of long term population decline. However, global and domestic factors combined in the 1970s and 1980s to return the country to poor economic performance and emigration. The 1990s, however saw the beginning of unprecedented economic success, in a phenomenon known as the "Celtic Tiger", which continued until the 2008 financial crisis, specifically the post-2008 Irish economic downturn. It also led to Ireland becoming the most indebted state in the European Union. As of 2015, the Republic has returned to growth, and was the fastest growing economy for that year. In May 2023, Irish unemployment was at a record low of 3.8%.

According to Oxford economic historian Kevin O'Rourke, Irish independence coupled with membership of the European Union have been crucial to Irish economic prosperity. Membership of the European single market reduced Irish dependence on the British economy and facilitated a modernization of the Irish economy.

== Overview ==
A 2018 study in The Economic History Review found that over the period 1922–79 that the UK economy had a major impact on consumer prices in Ireland but that the impact of the British economy on Irish GDP was more limited.

== Effects of revolution and partition ==
After the War of Independence, 26 counties of Ireland gained independence from the United Kingdom as a dominion called the Irish Free State – but 6 of the north-eastern counties remained in the UK as Northern Ireland. In 1937 the Irish Free State was re-established under its current name, Ireland.

A study of Irish share prices in 2013 indicates that an historic high point had been reached in the 1890s, with a subsequent decline to 1930.

There had already been a significant economic divide between the northeast 6 counties and the rest of Ireland, but following partition both regions further diverged. In the short term, this was accentuated by the nationalist policy of boycotting northern goods in response to attacks on Catholics and nationalists in Northern Ireland.

Partition had a devastating effect on what became Ireland's border area. County Donegal, for example, was economically separated from its natural regional economic centre of Derry. The rail network struggled to operate across two economic areas, finally closing across a vast swath of Ireland's border area (the only cross-border route today is between Belfast and Dublin).

However, overall it has been judged that, "the economic effects of partition were not and greatly affected the all-Ireland economy".

The Free State had the advantage, not possessed by Northern Ireland, of fiscal independence but the violence and disruption of the years 1919–1923 had caused a great deal of economic damage. As a result of the Civil War of 1922–23, the Free State started out with a very serious budget deficit, which was not fully cleared until 1931.

According to economic historian Kevin O'Rourke, the Irish economy remained underdeveloped for extended periods of time after partition due to its continuing excessive dependence on an underperforming British economy. He argues that European integration, which reduced dependence on the UK, substantially improved the Irish economy.

== 1922–1960s ==
According to a 2024 study in The Economic History Review, the Irish economy grew at 1.5 per cent per annum over the period 1924–1947. During this period, average living standards improved by 40 per cent. The Great Depression was relatively mild in Ireland.

The establishment of the Irish Free State gave rise to the first serious attempt since the 1890s to industrialise the south of Ireland, but always with scant resources. Farming became oriented around pasture rather than tillage, with the increased processing of products and the export business. The country was gradually electrified and new state-owned factories were encouraged, such as the Irish Sugar Company in Carlow.

Frank Barry and Mary E. Daly have argued that :

Ireland was a largely agrarian economy, trading almost exclusively with the UK, at the time of the Great Depression. Beef and dairy products comprised the bulk of exports, and Ireland fared well relative to many other commodity producers, particularly in the early years of the depression.

During the late 1930s the Fianna Fáil government began a disastrous dispute with Britain over the payment of land annuities, called The Economic War. The Irish state refused to continue paying land annuities, Britain put tariffs on Irish beef, and the Free State retaliated by imposing tariffs on British consumer goods; this "economic war" was resolved in 1938.

From 1932 Éamon de Valera abandoned free trade, pursued a protectionist policy and sought self-sufficiency, but the country was not wealthy enough to make this a success. This led to the state taking control of private interests in the name of the public interest – nationalization and monopoly creation similar to that in vogue at the time in many countries. Many of the industries which were brought under government control at the time remain under 'semi-state' control today – others were downsized or closed, while several were sold in the 1980s and 1990s. Irish Steel, for example, had been taken into government control in 1947 and was sold (for IR£1) in 1996.

== 1960s ==
In the 1960s the economy greatly expanded, under the leadership of Seán Lemass, many rehousing schemes (including Ballymun) were started to clear the Dublin tenements; however the Inter Party Government from 1948 to 1951 built more local authority houses than any other administration before or since, the Industrial Development Authority refocused on high technology and foreign direct investment was encouraged. The civil servant T. K. Whitaker provided a blueprint that chimed with Ireland's wish to join the EEC, fore-runner of today's EU. Education was also reformed to a large extent, the state built a RTC system and later two NIHE institutions; both systems greatly expanded education, in particular technical education, university education was also reformed and expanded. Entry into the European Economic Community (forerunner to the European Union) in 1973 also added to Ireland's economic prospects; 67% of Ireland's exports went to Britain in 1970 and decreased to 54% in 1975.

Professor Tom Garvin, professor Emeritus of Politics at University College Dublin, argued that Lemass suggested and enabled protectionism from 1932, and then was unduly credited when he chose to revert to a free trade policy after 1960.

The 1968 Buchanan Report was a significant report on the regional dimension to economic planning which had largely been ignored. The report, prepared by Colin Buchanan, a British town planner, investigated and recommended on the social and economic sustainability of industry in the regions. The reports recommended a limited number of development centres throughout Ireland, which would have a minimum self-sustaining size. This became quite controversial as there were fewer than a dozen of such places recommended. In the end local politics and patronage won out and the report was largely dropped with industry being ineffectively dispersed as local need arose.

== 1970s ==
There were a series of three major Irish bank strikes between 1966 and 1976 in all totalling about a year affecting most of the retail banking sector. Surprisingly these had very little effect on the growth of the economy.

In 1973, together with Denmark and the United Kingdom, Ireland joined the European Economic Community, which started a catching up process with the rest of Europe.

However the boom did not last for long. Industrial relations disputes, inflation from the oil crises of 1973 and 1979, new capital taxes and poor management of the economy by the government took their toll in the 1970s. By the 1980s Ireland was referred to as the 'sick man of Europe' .

== 1980 to early 1990s ==
The 1980s in the Republic of Ireland was one of the state's bleakest times. The Charles Haughey and Garret FitzGerald governments made this bad situation much worse with more massive borrowing and tax rates as high as 60% (with one Fine Gael finance minister suggesting people were not being taxed enough). After joining the ERM in 1979, Ireland was also saddled for much of the 1980s with an overvalued currency, which wasn't rectified until the 1986 devaluation, (it was devalued again in 1993 in response to sterling leaving the ERM). Much of the capital borrowed in the 1980s went towards propping up this overvalued currency. Foreign investment, in the form of risk capital, was discouraged by all the evident difficulties.

This was also an era of political instability and extreme political corruption, with power alternating between Fianna Fáil and Fine Gael, with some governments not even lasting a year, and in one case, three elections in eighteen months. Considerable support from the European Union was the only positive aspect.

== The 'Celtic Tiger' (1995–2007) ==
In the 1990s, the Republic's economy began the 'Celtic Tiger' phase. High FDI rate, a low corporate tax rate, better economic management and a new 'social partnership' approach to industrial relations together transformed the Irish economy. The European Union had contributed over €10 billion into infrastructure. By 2000 the Republic had become one of the world's wealthiest nations, unemployment was at 4% and income tax was almost half 1980s levels. During this time, the Irish economy grew by five to six percent annually, dramatically raising Irish monetary incomes to equal and eventually surpass those of many states in the rest of Western Europe.

Over the past decade, the Irish government has implemented a series of national economic programmes designed to curb inflation, ease tax burdens, reduce government spending as a percentage of GDP, increase labour force skills, and reward foreign investment. The Republic joined in launching the euro currency system in January 1999 along with eleven other European Union nations. The economy felt the impact of the global post-Dot Com economic slowdown in 2001, particularly in the high-tech export sector – the growth rate in that area was cut by nearly half. GDP growth continued to be relatively robust, with a rate of about 6% in 2001 and 2002 – but this was expected to fall to around 2% in 2003.

== Post-2007 ==
See: Economy of the Republic of Ireland

== See also ==
- Economy of the Republic of Ireland
- Economic history of Ireland
- Bord Snip
