= 1975 in Ireland =

- Centuries: 18th; 19th; 20th; 21st
- Decades: 1950s; 1960s; 1970s; 1980s; 1990s
- See also: 1975 in Northern Ireland; Other events of 1975; List of years in Ireland

Events in the year 1975 in Ireland.

== Incumbents ==
- President: Cearbhall Ó Dálaigh
- Taoiseach: Liam Cosgrave (FG)
- Tánaiste: Brendan Corish (Lab)
- Minister for Finance: Richie Ryan (FG)
- Chief Justice: Tom O'Higgins
- Dáil: 20th
- Seanad: 13th

== Events ==
- January–June – Ireland held the Presidency of the Council of the European Union for the first time.

=== January ===
- 7 January – Sinéad de Valera, wife of the former president, Éamon de Valera, died in Dublin aged 96.
- 30 January – Charles Haughey was brought back onto the Fianna Fáil party front bench.

=== March ===
- 14 March – Pierre Trudeau, the prime minister of Canada, paid a brief visit to Ireland and held bilateral talks at Dublin Castle.

=== April ===
- 17 April – Mary Immaculate College, Limerick, and Our Lady of Mercy College, Carysfort, became recognised colleges of the National University of Ireland.

=== June ===
- 18 June – Danny O'Hare became acting director of the National Institute for Higher Education, Dublin; a day later, the governing body first met.

=== July ===
- 31 July – Miami Showband killings: Three members of The Miami Showband and two terrorists were killed in an Ulster Volunteer Force ambush in County Down as the band returned home to Dublin from playing at a dance in Banbridge, Northern Ireland.

=== August ===
- 29 August – Former revolutionary, taoiseach, and president of Ireland, Éamon de Valera died in Dublin aged 92. The government announced a day of mourning.

=== October ===
- 3 October – Dutch industrialist and Limerick factory owner Tiede Herrema was kidnapped.
- 12 October – Oliver Plunkett, the 17th-century Archbishop of Armagh, was canonised by Pope Paul VI in Rome.
- 21 October – Tiede Herrema was located with his kidnappers in Monasterevin, County Kildare and a police siege began.

=== November ===
- 18 November – The Tiede Herrema kidnap siege ended.
- 29 November – Dublin Airport bombing: The arrivals terminal at Dublin Airport was bombed by the terrorist Ulster Defence Association, killing one person and injuring nine others. After the airport was evacuated, a second bomb exploded but no-one was hurt. Later, a suitcase was found that was destroyed in a controlled explosion by a bomb disposal team.

=== December ===
- 28 December – George Best played a League of Ireland match for Cork Celtic against Drogheda.

== Arts and literature ==
- 14 May – Cork-born writer Patrick Galvin's We Do It For Love, a satire on The Troubles, opened at the Lyric Theatre, Belfast.
- 7 October – Tom Murphy's play The Sanctuary Lamp opened at the Abbey Theatre, Dublin to religious controversy.
- Leland Bardwell, Pearse Hutchinson, Eiléan Ní Chuilleanáin and Macdara Woods founded the literary publication Cyphers.
- Garry Hynes, Mick Lally, and Marie Mullen founded the Druid Theatre Company in Galway.
- Lillias Mitchell founded the Irish Guild of Weavers, Spinners, and Dyers.
- Publications:
  - Eavan Boland's collection of poems The War Horse was published.
  - Paul Durcan's collection of poems O Westport in the Light of Asia Minor was published.
  - John McGahern's novel The Leavetaking was published.
  - John Ryan's memoir Remembering How We Stood was published.

== Sport ==
=== Golf ===
- The Carroll's Irish Open golf tournament was won by Irish player Christy O'Connor Jnr.

== Births ==
- 1 January – Lorraine Pilkington, actress.
- 24 January – Marie McMahon, long-distance runner
- 12 February – Andrew Myler, association football player.
- 1 March – Tara Blaise, singer.
- 17 April – Mark Foley, Limerick hurler.
- 19 April – Hugh O'Conor, actor.
- 25 April – Dara Ó Cinnéide, Kerry Gaelic footballer.
- 10 May – Clodagh McKenna, cookery writer and presenter.
- 10 June – Seánie McGrath, Cork hurler.
- 6 August – Willie Boland, association football player.
- 25 August – Pat Mulcahy, Cork hurler.
- 28 August – Gareth Farrelly, association football player.
- 15 September – Owen Butler, cricketer.
- 2 October – Girvan Dempsey, rugby player.
- 7 November – Ollie Moran, Limerick hurler.
- 16 December – Graham Lee, jockey.
- 18 December – David O'Doherty, comedian.
- 20 December – Graham Hopkins, drummer.

Full date unknown
- David Kitt, musician.
- Paul Murray, novelist.

== Deaths ==
- 7 January – Sinéad de Valera, writer and wife of former president, Éamon de Valera (born 1878).
- 23 February – Ernest Blythe, writer, journalist, and theatre manager, member of First Dáil, and Cabinet minister (born 1889).
- 27 February – John Vincent Holland, soldier, recipient of the Victoria Cross for gallantry in 1916 at Guillemont, France (born 1889).
- 21 April – James Kempster, cricketer (born 1892).
- 23 April – Michael Carty, Fianna Fáil party Teachta Dála (TD) (born 1916).
- 28 April – Tom Dreaper, horse trainer.
- 29 April – Arthur Blair-White, cricketer (born 1891).
- 10 May – Michael Tierney, Cumann na nGaedheal party TD, Fine Gael party member of Seanad Éireann (Senate) and President of University College Dublin (born 1894).
- 27 May – Robert Collis, physician and writer (born 1900).
- 24 June – Frank MacDermot, barrister, soldier, banker, and politician (born 1886).
- 31 July – Dan "Sandow" O'Donovan, Irish Republican Army member during the Irish War of Independence (b. c1895).
- 9 August – Maurice Gorham, journalist and broadcasting executive (born 1902).
- 10 August – Robert Barton, Sinn Féin party Member of Parliament, Cabinet minister, and signatory of Anglo-Irish Treaty 1921 (born 1881).
- 29 August – Éamon de Valera, former Taoiseach and President of Ireland (born 1882).
- 2 October – Séamus Murphy, sculptor (born 1907).
- 25 October – Padraig Marrinan, artist (born 1906).
- 26 October – William Teeling, author, traveller and UK politician (born 1903).
- 25 November – Moyna Macgill, stage and film actress, mother of Angela Lansbury (born 1895).
- 14 December – George Harman, cricketer and rugby player (born 1874).

== See also ==
- 1975 in Irish television
