= 1976 in Ireland =

- Centuries: 18th; 19th; 20th; 21st
- Decades: 1950s; 1960s; 1970s; 1980s; 1990s
- See also: 1976 in Northern Ireland; Other events of 1976; List of years in Ireland

Events from the year 1976 in Ireland.

== Incumbents ==
- President:
  - Cearbhall Ó Dálaigh (until 22 October 1976)
  - Patrick Hillery (from 3 December 1976)
- Taoiseach: Liam Cosgrave (FG)
- Tánaiste: Brendan Corish (Lab)
- Minister for Finance: Richie Ryan (FG)
- Chief Justice: Tom O'Higgins
- Dáil: 20th
- Seanad: 13th

== Events ==
=== January ===
- 5 January –
  - Former Taoiseach, John A. Costello, died in Dublin aged 84.
  - Kingsmill massacre: Ten Protestant workmen were killed in County Armagh, Northern Ireland, by members of the South Armagh Republican Action Force, after loyalists shot dead six Catholic civilians in South Armagh the previous day.

=== March ===
- 1 March – Merlyn Rees, Secretary of State for Northern Ireland in the Government of the United Kingdom, ended Special Category Status for those sentenced for crimes relating to civil violence in Northern Ireland.
- 4 March – The Northern Ireland Constitutional Convention was formally dissolved, resulting in direct rule of Northern Ireland by the Government of the United Kingdom in London.
- 18 March – Taoiseach Liam Cosgrave and Mrs. Cosgrave were greeted by President Gerald Ford and Mrs. Betty Ford at the White House in Washington DC.
- 31 March – Sallins Train Robbery: £200,000 was stolen from a CIÉ train at Sallins, County Kildare.

=== April ===
- 3 April – The last passenger train ran on the Limerick to Claremorris line, ending an 80-year north–south link along the western seaboard.

=== May ===
- 17 May – Tim Severin and his crew set sail from Dingle to America in the leather boat Brendan, tracing the route of the legendary 6th-century Irish monk, Brendan the Navigator. The Brendan reached Canada on 26 June.

=== June ===
- 29 June – The 20th century's highest temperature record in Ireland was 32.5 °C (90.5 °F) at Boora, County Offaly. The overall highest on record was in 1887.

=== July ===
- July – The rock band Horslips gave a rooftop performance from Bank of Ireland headquarters on Baggot Street in Dublin.
- 15 July – Four prisoners escaped when bombs exploded in the Special Criminal Court in Dublin.
- 21 July – The British ambassador, Christopher Ewart-Biggs, and a civil servant, Judith Cooke, were killed by a landmine at Sandyford, County Dublin.

=== September ===
- 1 September – The state of emergency in Ireland, legally in force since 1939, was lifted.
- 23 September – The President, Cearbhall Ó Dálaigh, consulted with the Council of State for four hours on whether to refer the Emergency Powers legislation to the Supreme Court.

=== October ===
- 22 October – President Ó Dálaigh resigned following insulting remarks by the Minister for Defence, Paddy Donegan, who called him a "thundering disgrace" in remarks to a reporter.
- 27 October – A new £5 note was introduced bearing an image of the 9th-century philosopher, Johannes Scotus Eriugena.

=== November ===
- 20 November – National Peace Day was marked with marches, church services, and bell ringing.

=== December ===
- 3 December – Patrick Hillery was inaugurated as the sixth President of Ireland in St. Patrick's Hall, Dublin Castle.
- 10 December – Betty Williams and Mairead Corrigan won the Nobel Peace Prize.
- The Islamic Foundation of Ireland established the first mosque in Ireland, in Dublin.

== Arts and literature ==
- 25 September – The band U2 was formed at Mount Temple Comprehensive School, Dublin.
- 9 December – Maeve Binchy's play End of Term premièred on the Abbey Theatre's Peacock Stage.
- The Rooney Prize for Irish Literature was launched; Heno Magee was the first recipient.
- John Banville's novel Doctor Copernicus was published.
- Breandán Ó hEithir's novel Lig Sinn i gCathú was published and became the first Irish language book to top Ireland's hardback bestseller list.
- The monthly journal Books Ireland was founded.

== Sport ==
=== Golf ===
- Carroll's Irish Open was won by Ben Crenshaw (USA).

== Births ==
- 10 January – Jason Sherlock, Dublin Gaelic footballer.
- 6 February – Darragh Maguire, association football player.
- 10 February – Tony McDonnell, association football player.
- 12 February – Mundy (Edmond Enright), folk singer-songwriter.
- 13 February – Denis Hickie, rugby player.
- 17 March – Stephen Gately, singer and actor.
- 20 April – Shay Given, association football player.
- 24 April – Steve Finnan, association football player.
- 15 May – Mark Kennedy, association football player.
- 25 May – Cillian Murphy, actor.
- 29 May – Michael O'Donovan, Cork Gaelic footballer.
- 31 May – Colin Farrell, actor.
- 2 June – Dáithí Ó Sé, television host.
- 3 June – Enda Markey, Irish-Australian actor and producer.
- 12 June – Tony Scully, association football player.
- 15 June – Gary Lightbody, alternative rock singer (Snow Patrol).
- 29 June – Duncan O'Mahony, Canadian football punter and placekicker.
- 3 July – Shane Lynch, singer and actor.
- 8 July – David Wallace, rugby player.
- 9 July – Ollie Canning, Galway hurler.
- 14 July – Kirsten Sheridan, film director and screenwriter.
- 23 July – Brian Carney, rugby player.
- 11 August – Claire Byrne, journalist and television presenter.
- 18 August – Robbie Murray, boxer.
- 29 August – Joseph Armstrong, boxer.
- 16 September – Liz Bonnin, television presenter.
- 18 September – Adam Mates, pop singer with (OTT band).
- 4 October – Owen Heary, association football player.
- 15 October – Paul Mooney, cricketer.
- 19 October – Alan Quirke, Cork Gaelic footballer.
- 20 October – John Leonard, Dublin Gaelic footballer.
- 21 October – Andrew Scott, actor.
- 29 October – Mark Sheehan, musician.
- 26 December – Donie Ryan, Limerick hurler.

Full date unknown
- Paddy Christie, Dublin Gaelic footballer.
- Kevin Flynn, Dublin hurler.
- Donal Ryan, novelist.

== Deaths ==
- 5 January – John A. Costello, barrister, Attorney General, Fine Gael Teachta Dála (TD), and twice Taoiseach (born 1891).
- 19 January – John Hunt, antiquarian (born 1900 in England).
- 23 January – David Sullivan, labour leader in USA (born 1904).
- 2 February – Gardner Budd, lawyer.
- 6 February – Dan Kennedy, Kilkenny hurler (born 1926).
- 12 February – Frank Stagg, Provisional Irish Republican Army hunger striker for 62 days in Wakefield Prison (born 1942).
- 28 February – Pat Hone, cricketer (born 1886).
- 29 February – Liam Cunningham, Fianna Fáil party TD (born 1915).
- 8 March – Edward FitzGerald, 7th Duke of Leinster, peer and gambler (born 1892).
- 13 April
  - Willie Hough, Limerick hurler (born 1892).
  - Noel Lemass, Fianna Fáil TD (born 1929).
- 4 May – Hugh Delargy, British Labour Party politician and Member of Parliament (MP) (born 1908).
- 27 June – Derrick Kennedy, cricketer (born 1904).
- 11 July – Michael Hayes, pro-treaty TD, Cabinet Minister, Ceann Comhairle of Dáil Éireann and Seanad Éireann member (born 1889).
- 22 July – Jim Ganly, cricketer and rugby player (born 1904).
- 29 July – Knox Cunningham, barrister, businessman and Ulster Unionist politician (born 1909).
- 12 September – Reginald Lyons, cricketer (born 1922).
- 7 October – Michael O'Neill, nationalist politician and MP (born 1909).
- 15 October – James Ennis, cricketer (born 1900).
- 31 October – Eileen Gray, architect and designer (born 1878).
- 2 November – Walter Starkie, author and translator (born 1894).
- 14 November – Frederick Alfred Pile, soldier and politician (born 1884).
- 4 December – W. F. McCoy, Ulster Unionist member of the Parliament of Northern Ireland (born 1886).

== See also ==
- 1976 in Irish television
