= 1973 in Ireland =

- Centuries: 18th; 19th; 20th; 21st
- Decades: 1950s; 1960s; 1970s; 1980s; 1990s
- See also: 1973 in Northern Ireland; Other events of 1973; List of years in Ireland

Events in the year 1973 in Ireland.

== Incumbents ==
- President:
  - Éamon de Valera (until 24 June 1973)
  - Erskine H. Childers (from 25 June 1973)
- Taoiseach:
  - Jack Lynch (FF) (until 14 March 1973)
  - Liam Cosgrave (FG) (from 14 March 1973)
- Tánaiste:
  - Erskine H. Childers (FF) (until 14 March 1973)
  - Brendan Corish (Lab) (from 14 March 1973)
- Minister for Finance:
  - George Colley (FF) (until 14 March 1973)
  - Richie Ryan (FG) (from 14 March 1973)
- Chief Justice:
  - Cearbhall Ó Dálaigh (until 22 September 1973)
  - William FitzGerald (from 25 September 1973)
- Dáil:
  - 19th (until 5 February 1973)
  - 20th (from 14 March 1973)
- Seanad:
  - 12th (until 30 March 1973)
  - 13th (from 1 June 1973)

== Events ==
=== January ===
- 1 January – Ireland joined the European Economic Community (EEC) along with the United Kingdom and Denmark.
- 5 January – The Fifth Amendment of the Constitution of Ireland was signed into law, removing the "special position" of the Roman Catholic Church and recognition of certain other named religions.
- 6 January – Patrick Hillery was appointed Social Affairs Commissioner of the EEC.

=== February ===
- 28 February – The National Coalition of the Fine Gael party and Labour Party won the general election, ending 16 years of Fianna Fáil party government.

=== March ===
- 8 March
  - Northern Ireland sovereignty referendum (the "Border Poll"): 98.9 percent of voters wanted Northern Ireland to remain within the United Kingdom. Turnout was 58.7 percent overall, but fewer than one percent among Catholics.
  - Provisional Irish Republican Army (IRA) bombs exploded in Whitehall and the Old Bailey in London.
- 14 March – The new Taoiseach (prime minister), Liam Cosgrave, received his seal of office from President Éamon de Valera at the President's residence, Áras an Uachtaráin.
- 25 March – The first edition of the Sunday World newspaper, printed in Dublin, went on sale.

=== April ===
- 2 April – The Civil Authorities (Special Powers) Act (Northern Ireland) 1922 was replaced by the Northern Ireland (Emergency Provisions) Act abolishing the death penalty for murder in Northern Ireland and establishing the Diplock courts.
- 11 April – The funeral took place of the former Archbishop of Dublin, John Charles McQuaid.
- 16 April – IRA chief Seán Mac Stíofáin was freed from jail.
- 28 April – Six men, including Joe Cahill, were arrested by the Irish Naval Service off County Waterford on board a coaster carrying five tons of weapons destined for the IRA.

=== May ===
- 30 May – In the 1973 presidential election, Fianna Fáil party candidate Erskine Childers beat Fine Gael party candidate Tom O'Higgins, and was inaugurated at Dublin Castle, on his father's birthday anniversary on 25 June as Ireland's fourth president.

=== June ===
- 6 June – Irish Continental Line (a joint venture between Irish Shipping Limited, Fearnley & Eger and Swedish company Lion Ferry) began operation with MS Saint Patrick on the Rosslare–Le Havre route.
- 24 June – President Éamon de Valera retired from office aged 90. He travelled to Boland's Mill, where he was positioned during the Easter Rising. The motorcade then proceeded to Talbot Lodge nursing home in Blackrock where he spent his retirement.
- 28 June – The Northern Ireland Assembly election took place.

=== July ===
- 10 July – The funeral of General Seán Mac Eoin took place in Ballinalee, County Longford.
- 18 July – The office of Governor of Northern Ireland, at this time held by The Lord Grey of Naunton, was abolished under Section 32 of the Northern Ireland Constitution Act. The Secretary of State for Northern Ireland, a UK cabinet office created in 1972, took over the functions of the Governor on 20 December 1973 under letters patent.
- 31 July
  - The Civil Service (Employment of Married Women) Act became law, ending the marriage bar which had prevented married women from working in the civil service. The marriage bar in the wider public sector ended the following year.
  - The first sitting of the Northern Ireland Assembly took place.

=== September ===
- 1 September
  - The deepest underwater rescue ever performed took place 150 miles southwest of County Cork when the submarine Pisces III got into difficulties while laying a transatlantic telephone cable on the seabed. The crew, Roger Mallinson and Roger Chapman, were rescued by an international group of vessels after three days, having sunk to a depth of 1,575 feet below sea level on 29 August.
  - The 27 Infantry Battalion of the Irish Army was formed, with headquarters at Aiken Barracks, Dundalk.

=== October ===
- 10 October – The Dalai Lama Tenzin Gyatso, on his first visit to Ireland, went to Áras an Uachtaráin where he was welcomed by President Childers.
- 31 October – Mountjoy Prison helicopter escape: Three IRA prisoners escaped from Mountjoy Prison in Dublin in a hijacked helicopter that landed in the prison yard.

=== November ===
- 1 November – James Flanagan became the first Roman Catholic Chief Constable of the Royal Ulster Constabulary.

=== December ===
- 9 December – The Sunningdale Agreement was signed by British Prime Minister Edward Heath, Taoiseach Liam Cosgrave, Brian Faulkner, Gerry Fitt and Oliver Napier.
- 19 December – In the landmark case McGee v The Attorney General, the Supreme Court ruled that married couples enjoy the right to privacy in their relationships, thus paving the way for such couples to use contraception legally.

== Arts and literature ==
- 7 August – Hugh Leonard's play Da was staged for the first time in the United States (the Irish première was on 8 October at the Olympia Theatre in Dublin).
- February – Iris Murdoch's novel The Black Prince was published.
- September – Horslips album The Táin was recorded and released.

== Sports ==
=== Association football ===
==== International results ====
World Cup qualifiers

- 13 May – Soviet Union 1–0 Ireland.
- 19 May – France 1–1 Ireland.

Ireland did not qualify for the 1974 World Cup.

==== International friendly matches ====
- 16 May – Poland 2–0 Ireland.
- 6 June – Norway 1–1 Ireland.
- 21 October – Ireland 1–0 Poland.

=== Single-handed sailing ===
- Anglo-Irish sailor Bill King completed a three-year solo world circumnavigation at the third attempt in his junk-rigged schooner Galway Blazer II.

== Births ==
- 12 March – Mark Daly, Fianna Fáil Senator.
- 17 March – Caroline Corr, drummer with The Corrs.
- 23 March – Brian Corcoran, Cork Gaelic footballer and hurler.
- 26 March – James Keddy, association football player.
- 29 April – Mike Hogan, bass guitarist with The Cranberries.
- 5 May – Kevin McBride, boxer.
- 7 May – Rick O'Shea, radio disc jockey.
- 10 May – Dara Calleary, Fianna Fáil Teachta Dála (TD) for Mayo.
- 14 May – Sinéad O'Carroll, singer and musician.
- 25 May – Joe Dunne, association football player.
- 28 May – Ryan Tubridy, television and radio presenter.
- 12 June – Amanda Brunker, Miss Ireland and journalist.
- 5 July – Róisín Murphy, singer, songwriter and producer.
- 30 July – Dave Savage, association football player.
- 2 August – Stephen McGuinness, association football player.
- 21 August – Mickey Joe Harte, singer-songwriter.
- 5 September – Robbie Brunton, association football player (died 2020).
- 17 September – Marc Kenny, association football player.
- 19 September – Nick Colgan, association football player.
- 22 September – Trevor Brennan, international rugby player.
- 30 October – Anthony Foley, international rugby player (died 2016).
- 2 November – John Hayes, rugby player.
- 5 November – Gráinne Seoige, journalist, television presenter.
- 14 November – Andrew Strong, actor and singer.
- 2 December – Graham Kavanagh, association football player.
- 7 December – Damien Rice, singer songwriter.
- 14 December – Pat Burke, basketball player.
- 14 December – Amanda Byram, television presenter.
- 24 December – Oisin Fagan, boxer.

Full date unknown
- Claire Kilroy, novelist.
- Oisín McGann, author and illustrator.
- Seánie McMahon, Clare hurler.
- Sarah O'Flaherty, television presenter.
- Caitriona O'Reilly, poet and critic.

== Deaths ==
- 5 January – Gerald Boland, founder member of the Fianna Fáil party, government minister (born 1885).
- 10 January – Denis Rolleston Gwynn, journalist, author, and professor of Modern Irish History (born 1893).
- 12 January – Maurice Collis, colonial administrator and writer (born 1889).
- 19 January – Max Adrian, actor (born 1903).
- 31 January – Jack MacGowran, actor (born 1918).
- January – Willie Clancy, uileann piper (born 1918).
- 22 February – Elizabeth Bowen, novelist and short story writer (born 1899).
- 13 March – Eddie Ingram, cricketer (born 1910).
- 8 April – E. R. Dodds, classical scholar (born 1893).
- 9 April – Warren Lewis, soldier and historian, brother of C. S. Lewis (born 1895).
- 17 May – Lory Meagher, Kilkenny hurler (born 1899).
- 18 May – Ronald Ossory Dunlop, painter and author (born 1894).
- 21 May – Eugene O'Callaghan, Bishop of Clogher 1943–1969 (born 1888).
- 24 May – Bryan Cusack, doctor, Sinn Féin MP, member of the First Dáil (born 1882).
- 7 April – John Charles McQuaid, Catholic Archbishop of Dublin and Primate of Ireland (born 1895).
- 7 July – Seán MacEoin, major general, former Fine Gael TD and cabinet minister (born 1893).
- 25 July – Michael Davern, Fianna Fáil TD for Tipperary South 1948–1965 (born 1900).
- 18 August – Basil Brooke, 1st Viscount Brookeborough, Ulster Unionist Party MP, third Prime Minister of Northern Ireland (born 1888).
- 21 August – Dinny Barry-Murphy, Cork hurler (born 1903).
- 20 September – Patrick O'Keeffe, member of First Dáil representing North Cork.
- 26 October – Tomás Bairéad, journalist and author (born 1893).
- 31 October – Elizabeth Watkins, born in Ireland, died as the oldest person in the world (born 1863).
- 4 December – Tom McEllistrim, Fianna Fáil TD (born 1894).

== See also ==
- 1973 in Irish television
