= 1968 in Ireland =

- Centuries: 18th; 19th; 20th; 21st
- Decades: 1940s; 1950s; 1960s; 1970s; 1980s
- See also: 1968 in Northern Ireland; Other events of 1968; List of years in Ireland

Events in the year 1968 in Ireland.

== Incumbents ==
- President: Éamon de Valera
- Taoiseach: Jack Lynch (FF)
- Tánaiste: Frank Aiken (FF)
- Minister for Finance: Charles Haughey (FF)
- Chief Justice: Cearbhall Ó Dálaigh
- Dáil: 18th
- Seanad: 11th

== Events ==
=== January ===
- 8 January – Taoiseach Jack Lynch and Northern Ireland Prime Minister Terence O'Neill met for talks in Dublin.

=== March ===
- 10 March – Minister for Education Donogh O'Malley died while campaigning in County Clare.
- 17 March – A seat to commemorate the poet Patrick Kavanagh was unveiled beside the Grand Canal in Dublin.
- 24 March – The Aer Lingus aircraft, St Phelim, plunged into the Irish Sea near the Tuskar Rock lighthouse killing all 57 passengers.

=== May ===
- 14 May – King Baudouin and Queen Fabiola of Belgium began a state visit to Ireland. A state dinner was held in their honour at Áras an Uachtaráin this evening.
- 15 May – The King and Queen of Belgium visited Trinity College Dublin, University College Dublin, and the National Museum. They also visited the Lord Mayor of Dublin, Frank Cluskey, at the Mansion House, and attended a state banquet at Dublin Castle in the evening.
- 16 May – The King and Queen of Belgium attended a party at the Abbey Theatre in Dublin.
- 17 May – The King and Queen of Belgium paid a second visit to Áras an Uachtaráin where Baudouin played hurling with President Éamon de Valera and Taoiseach Jack Lynch. The royal couple each planted a tree in the garden of the residence. The President, the Taoiseach, and Minister for External Affairs, Frank Aiken later accompanied the king and queen to a farewell ceremony at Dublin Airport.
- 29 May – President de Valera opened the John F. Kennedy Arboretum and Memorial Park in New Ross, County Wexford.

=== June ===
- 6 June – Ireland mourned the loss of assassinated United States Senator Robert F. Kennedy. Dáil Éireann paid tribute and a book of condolence was opened.

=== October ===
- 5 October – Police in Derry baton-charged a Northern Ireland civil rights march.
- 8 October – Twenty new traffic wardens were introduced on Dublin's streets.
- 16 October – The 1968 Irish constitutional referendum was held proposing changes to the electoral system. The proposals were rejected.
- 25 October – The New University of Ulster opened in Coleraine, County Londonderry.
- 27 October – The Standard Time Act 1968 stipulated that Irish Standard Time is UTC+1 (Central European Time) and clocks were not to be turned back one hour during winter.

=== November ===
- 2 November – An anti-Vietnam War protest organised by the Irish Voice on Vietnam and consisting of over 250 people took place in Dublin. The protestors marched from Parnell Square to the United States Embassy in Ballsbridge, and to the Department of External Affairs.

=== December ===
- 13 December – According to the Economic and Social Research Institute 60 percent of undergraduates in Ireland would emigrate upon graduation.

=== Full date unknown ===
- County Hall, Cork was opened; at the time it was the tallest storeyed building in Ireland.

== Arts and literature ==
- 28 February – The first English-language production of Samuel Beckett's Come and Go was performed at the Peacock Theatre in Dublin.
- Tom Murphy's plays Famine (21 March) and The Orphans (7 October) were first produced in Dublin (at the Abbey and Gate Theatres respectively).
- February - The record label Dolphin Records was established in Dublin.

== Sport ==
- 29 May – Tony Dunne and George Best became the first Irish footballers to collect European Cup winner's medals as Manchester United F.C. defeated Benfica in the final at Wembley Stadium.
- 1 September – Wexford beat Tipperary 5–8 to 3–12 in the All Ireland Senior Hurling Final at Croke Park, Dublin.
- 18 September – George Best was the star attraction as Manchester United beat Waterford City 3–1 at the Lansdowne Road stadium in Dublin.
- 22 September – Down defeated Kerry 2–12 to 1–13 in the All Ireland Senior Football Final.

== Births ==
- 12 January – Michael Moynihan, Fianna Fáil Teachta Dála (TD) for Cork North-West .
- 15 January – Tom Murphy, actor (died 2007).
- 19 January – Fiona O'Malley, Progressive Democrats TD, Senator.
- 20 January - Charlie Swan, jockey and trainer.
- 23 January – Simon Cumbers, journalist (murdered 2004 in Saudi Arabia).
- 21 February – Michael Duignan, Offaly hurler and Gaelic footballer, manager.
- 24 March – Conor Hoey, cricketer.
- 26 March – Nick Sweeney, discus thrower.
- 24 April – Aidan Gillen, born Murphy, actor.
- May – Linda Doyle, electrical engineer, provost of Trinity College Dublin.
- 22 May – Graham Linehan, television writer and director.
- 31 May – John Connolly, novelist.
- 7 June – Robbie Horgan, association football player.
- 28 July – Eoin Collins, tennis player.
- 11 August – Alan Kelly, Jr., English-born Irish international footballer.
- 24 August – Keelin Shanley, television news presenter (died 2020).
- 10 September – Mark Little, journalist and television presenter.
- 15 September – James O'Higgins Norman, academic and author.
- 23 October – Eddie Gormley, association football player and manager.
- 24 October – Tom McEllistrim, Fianna Fáil party TD for Kerry North.
- 12 November – Sharon Shannon, accordion player and musician.
- 20 December – Paul Gogarty, Green Party TD.
- 16 November – Panti (Rory O'Neill), drag queen.
- 27 November – Cecilia Keaveney, Fianna Fáil party TD, Senator.

Full date unknown
- Patrick Chapman, poet and screenwriter.
- Fergus Feehily, artist.
- Justin Quinn, poet and literary critic.
- Colin Teevan, playwright, radio dramatist, translator and academic.

== Deaths ==
- 1 January – Donagh MacDonagh, writer and judge (born 1912).
- 19 January – Sir Alfred Chester Beatty, mining magnate and benefactor (born 1875).
- February – Joan de Sales La Terriere, socialite, equestrienne and divorcée (born 1889).
- 8 February – Louise McIlroy, Professor of Obstetrics and Gynaecology at the London School of Medicine for Women (born 1874).
- 10 March – Donogh O'Malley, Fianna Fáil TD and Cabinet minister (born 1921).
- 24 March – Gladys Wynne, artist (born 1876).
- 16 July – William John Leech, painter (born 1881).
- 11 September – Denis McCullough, member of the Irish Volunteers elected to the fourth Dáil (born 1883).
- 31 October – William O'Brien, politician and trade unionist (born 1881).
- 2 November
  - Don Davern, Fianna Fáil TD for Tipperary South from 1965 until his death (born 1935).
  - Estella Solomons, painter (born 1882).
- 7 November – Margaret Mary Pearse, Fianna Fáil TD and Seanad Éireann member, sister of Patrick Pearse (born 1878).
- 24 December – Eamon Bulfin, Irish republican (born 1892).

Full date unknown
- William Conor, artist (born 1881).
- Harry Duggan, soccer player (born 1903).

== See also ==
- 1968 in Irish television
