= 1978 in Ireland =

- Centuries: 18th; 19th; 20th; 21st
- Decades: 1950s; 1960s; 1970s; 1980s; 1990s
- See also: 1978 in Northern Ireland; Other events of 1978; List of years in Ireland

Events from the year 1978 in Ireland.

== Incumbents ==
- President: Patrick Hillery
- Taoiseach: Jack Lynch (FF)
- Tánaiste: George Colley (FF)
- Minister for Finance: George Colley (FF)
- Chief Justice: Tom O'Higgins
- Dáil: 21st
- Seanad: 14th

== Events ==
=== January ===
- 18 January – The European Court of Human Rights found Britain guilty of inhuman and degrading treatment of republican internees in Northern Ireland.
- 19 January – The Fianna Fáil government dismissed the Garda Commissioner Edmund Garvey. No explanation was given.
- 21 January – Johnny Giles resigned as manager of the Republic of Ireland national football team.

=== February ===
- 14 February – The Talbot Memorial Bridge was opened in Dublin.

=== March ===
- 23 March – The state funeral of former President Cearbhall Ó Dálaigh took place in Sneem, County Kerry.
- 31 March – Six thousand people marched through Dublin to Wood Quay to protest against the building of civic offices above an ancient Viking settlement.

=== May ===
- 27 May – Brittany Ferries inaugurated a regular Cork–Roscoff service.

=== June ===
- 1 June – David Cook of the Alliance Party became the first non-Unionist Lord Mayor of Belfast.
- 21 June – Rosemary Smith established an Irish land speed record of 156.101 mph on the Carrigrohane Straight in Cork, driving a seven-litre Jaguar XJ6.

=== August ===
- 10 August – A new £10 note bearing an image of the writer Jonathan Swift was introduced.
- 19 August – Over 5,000 people took part in a rally against a proposed nuclear power station in Carnsore Point, County Wexford.

=== September ===
- 1 September – Dublin Institute of Technology was created on an ad hoc basis by the City of Dublin Vocational Education Committee.

=== November ===
- 2 November – Ireland's second national television channel, RTÉ 2, opened with a live broadcast from the Cork Opera House.
- November – Cork Regional Hospital officially opened in Cork.

=== Full date unknown ===
- The first Supermac's fast food restaurant opened.

== Arts and literature ==
- Iris Murdoch was awarded the Booker Prize for her novel The Sea, The Sea.
- Peter Sheridan was awarded the Rooney Prize for Irish Literature.
- Seán Ó Ríordáin's posthumous poetry collection Tar éis mo Bháis was published.
- First broadcast of craft TV series Hands.

== Sport ==
=== Athletics ===
- 25 March – John Treacy won the world cross-country championship in Glasgow.

=== Golf ===
- Carroll's Irish Open was won by Ken Brown (Scotland).

=== Horse racing ===
- Shergar won the Epsom Derby (by a record ten lengths), and the Irish Derby.

== Births ==
- 11 January – Adrian O'Connor, backstroke swimmer.
- 12 January – David Worrell, association footballer.
- 19 January – Simon Webb, association footballer.
- 28 January – Sheamus, pro wrestler.
- 30 January – John Doyle, Kildare Gaelic footballer.
- 21 February – Damien English, Fine Gael Teachta Dála (TD) for Meath West.
- 23 February – Jason Byrne, association footballer.
- 7 March – John Miskella, Cork Gaelic footballer.
- 9 March – Derek O'Connor, association footballer.
- 16 March – Jemma Redmond, biochemist, pioneer of 3D bioprinting (died 2016).
- 2 April – John Hoyne, Kilkenny hurler.
- 4 April – Alan Mahon, association footballer.
- 5 April – Stephen Murphy, association footballer.
- 19 April – Geordan Murphy, international rugby player.
- 23 April – Nicholas Murphy, Cork Gaelic footballer.
- 24 April – Jimmy Coogan, Kilkenny hurler.
- 29 April – David O'Loughlin, cyclist.
- 5 May – Paul Byrne, broadcast journalist.
- 10 June – Karl Scully, tenor.
- 21 June – Wayne Sherlock, Cork hurler.
- 25 June – Kieran Kelly, jump jockey (killed in racing accident 2003).
- 4 July – Derek Lyng, Kilkenny hurler.
- 18 July
  - Shane Horgan, international rugby player.
  - Annie Mac(Manus), disc jockey and broadcast presenter.
- 27 July – Brian Barry-Murphy, association footballer.
- July – Diarmuid O'Sullivan, Cork hurler.
- 8 August – Alan Maybury, association footballer.
- 21 August – Alan Lee, association footballer.
- 28 August – Barry Ryan, association footballer.
- 27 September – John Paul Phelan, Fine Gael party Senator.
- 1 October – Barry Conlon, association footballer.
- 2 October – Eddie Brennan, Kilkenny hurler.
- 5 October – Shane Ryan, Gaelic footballer.
- 9 October – Nicky Byrne, entertainer, singer with Westlife, and television host.
- 17 October – Jerry Flannery, international rugby player.
- 25 October – Chris Keane, rugby player.
- 31 October – Ella McSweeney, radio and television producer
- 9 November – Martin Comerford, Kilkenny hurler.
- 15 December – Edele and Keavy Lynch, members of B*Witched.
- 22 December – Eugene Cloonan, Galway hurler.

Full date unknown
- Caoimhe Butterly, human rights activist.
- Julie Feeney, singer songwriter.
- Mike FitzGerald, Limerick hurler.
- Richie Mullally, Kilkenny hurler.
- Mike O'Brien, Limerick hurler.

== Deaths ==
- 23 January – Cormac Breslin, Fianna Fáil Teachta Dála (TD) and Ceann Comhairle of Dáil Éireann (born 1902).
- 4 March – Emmet Dalton, Republican activist, soldier and film producer (born 1898 in the United States).
- 6 March – Micheál MacLiammóir, actor and dramatist (born 1899 in London).
- 21 March – Cearbhall Ó Dálaigh, Attorney-general, Chief Justice of Ireland and fifth President of Ireland (born 1911).
- 7 July – Mary Swanzy, painter (born 1882; died in London).
- 28 August – Robert Shaw, actor and novelist (born 1927 in England).
- 12 September – Wilfred Hutton, cricketer (born 1901).
- October – Moss (Maurice) Twomey, chief of staff of the Irish Republican Army (born 1897).
- 5 November – Denis O'Dea, actor (born 1905).
- 13 December – Jack Doyle, boxer, actor and singer (born 1913; died in London).
- Full date unknown – Gabriel Hayes, sculptor, designer of Irish coins (born 1909).

== See also ==
- 1978 in Irish television
