= 1971 in Ireland =

- Centuries: 18th; 19th; 20th; 21st
- Decades: 1950s; 1960s; 1970s; 1980s; 1990s
- See also: 1971 in Northern Ireland; Other events of 1971; List of years in Ireland

Events in the year 1971 in Ireland.

== Incumbents ==
- President: Éamon de Valera
- Taoiseach: Jack Lynch (FF)
- Tánaiste: Erskine H. Childers (FF)
- Minister for Finance: George Colley (FF)
- Chief Justice: Cearbhall Ó Dálaigh
- Dáil: 19th
- Seanad: 12th

== Events ==
=== January ===
- 4 January – John McQuaid retired after thirty years as Roman Catholic Archbishop of Dublin. Dermot Ryan was appointed to succeed him on 29 December.

=== February ===
- 15 February – Decimalisation: Ireland and the United Kingdom both switched to decimal currency.
- 25 February – A partial eclipse of the sun (magnitude 0.708) darkened the sky across Ireland. In Dublin, the event lasted two hours and seven minutes. It began at 9.35 am; the maximum was at 10.37 am when 70.8% of the sun's disc was covered by the moon; and it ended at 11.42 am.

=== March ===
- 6 March
  - Crowds assembled at Dublin Airport to witness the first flight of a Boeing 747 aircraft in Ireland when Aer Lingus took delivery of its first Jumbo Jet, the Saint Columcille (registration number EI-ASI), which arrived from New York.
  - The rock group Led Zeppelin played their only concert in Ireland at the National Stadium in Dublin.
- 17 March
  - RTÉ Television transmitted its first home-produced production in colour when it broadcast the Railway Cup Finals.
  - The giant Jumbo Jet recently arrived in Ireland flew over the Saint Patrick's Day parade, north along O'Connell Street, Dublin, escorted by four smaller aircraft from the Irish Air Corps.
- 20 March – Major James Chichester-Clark resigned as Prime Minister of Northern Ireland. He was succeeded on 23 March by Brian Faulkner.

=== April ===
- 3 April – The Eurovision Song Contest was held in Dublin for the first time. It was presented by Bernadette Ní Ghallchóir.
- 11 April
  - Ten British Army soldiers were injured in rioting in Derry.
  - The Gaelic Athletic Association voted to lift its ban on members participating in "foreign games" such as association football, rugby and cricket.
- 20 April – Two British Royal Navy survey launches moored off Baltimore, County Cork, were towed out to sea and bombed by a Provisional Irish Republican Army unit. One of them, the Stork, was wrecked.

=== May ===
- 11 May – Seán Lemass, taoiseach from 1959 to 1966, died aged 71. He fought during the 1916 Easter Rising, the War of Independence and the Civil War.
- 22 May – Members of the Irish Women's Liberation Movement returned to Dublin bringing contraceptives from Belfast on the so-called "Contraceptive Train" to protest against the law banning their importation.

=== July ===
- 8 July – Two rioters were shot dead by British troops in Derry.
- 16 July – The Social Democratic and Labour Party (SDLP) announced that it was withdrawing from the Stormont parliament.

=== August ===
- 9 August – Internment without trial was introduced in Northern Ireland. Over 300 republicans were arrested in pre-dawn raids by British security forces and interned in Long Kesh prison. Some Loyalists were later arrested. Twenty people died in riots that followed, including eleven in the Ballymurphy Massacre.
- 12 August – British troops began clearing operations in Belfast following the worst rioting in years. Taoiseach Jack Lynch called for an end to the Stormont administration.
- 21 August – The Irish Independent reported that RTÉ had made the decision to restrict the broadcasting of an album of Irish rebel songs entitled "Up The Rebels" (featuring The Wolfe Tones), which had been recently re-released by Dolphin Records. A spokesman for RTÉ said that the broadcaster had decided "not to play records which could create tension in Northern Ireland", but assured that the decision would be rescinded once the problems in Northern Ireland had subsided.

=== September ===
- 7 September – The death toll in The Troubles reached 100 after three years of violence, with the death of 14-year-old Annette McGavigan, who was killed by a gunshot during crossfire between British soldiers and the IRA.
- 25 September – A rally took place in Dublin in support of a campaign of civil disobedience in Northern Ireland.
- 27 September – Prime ministers Edward Heath, Jack Lynch, and Brian Faulkner met at Chequers to discuss the Northern Ireland situation.

=== October ===
- 13 October – The British Army began to destroy roads between Ireland and Northern Ireland as a security measure.
- 23 October – Two women were shot dead by soldiers in Belfast when their car failed to stop at a checkpoint.
- 31 October – The Standard Time (Amendment) Act, 1971 reversed the main provision of the Standard Time Act 1968, returning Irish winter time to UTC+0 (Western European Time).

=== November ===
- 10 November – The Government defeated a motion of no confidence in the Minister for Agriculture, Jim Gibbons.
- 17 November – Neil Blaney and Paudge Brennan were expelled from the Fianna Fáil parliamentary party.

=== December ===
- 4 December – The McGurk's Bar bombing, carried out by the Ulster Volunteer Force in Belfast, killed 15 people, the highest death toll from a single incident in the city during The Troubles.

=== Undated ===
- Units 1 and 2 of Poolbeg Generating Station in Dublin were completed.

== Arts and literature ==
- 27 September – Satirical television series Hall's Pictorial Weekly was first broadcast on RTÉ.
- Playwrights John Arden and Margaretta D'Arcy settled in County Galway.
- John Banville's novel Nightspawn was published.
- Thomas Kilroy's novel The Big Chapel was published.
- Seán Ó Ríordáin's poetry collection Línte Liombó was published.
- Francis Stuart's autobiographical novel Black List, Section H was published.

== Sports ==
All-Ireland Senior Football Championship: Offaly 1–14 Galway 2–8

All-Ireland Senior Hurling Championship: Tipperary 5–17 Kilkenny 5–14

== Births ==
- 19 January
  - Charlie Carter, Kilkenny hurler.
  - John Troy, Offaly hurler.
- 20 January – Ger McDonnell, mountaineer and engineer (died 2008).
- 31 January – Mark Geary, folk singer-songwriter.
- 4 March – Fergal Lawler, rock drummer with The Cranberries.
- 12 March – Conrad Gallagher, chef.
- 6 April – Derek Tracey, association football player.
- 13 April – Justin Barrett, political activist.
- 29 April – Adrian Maguire, jockey.
- 30 April – John Boyne, novelist.
- 18 June – Jason McAteer, international association football player.
- 28 June – Kenny Cunningham, association football player.
- 16 July – Joe McHugh, Fine Gael party Teachta Dála (TD) for Donegal North-East, senator.
- 30 July – Hubert Rigney, Offaly hurler.
- 2 August – Davy FitzGerald, Clare hurler.
- 4 August – Paul McCarthy, association football player (died 2017).
- 6 August – Conor McPherson, playwright and director.
- 10 August – Roy Keane, Manchester United and Glasgow Celtic footballer and Sunderland manager.
- 17 August – Anthony Kearns, tenor.
- 18 August – Aphex Twin (Richard D. James), electronic music artist.
- 31 August – Pádraig Harrington, golfer, winner of 2007 Open Championship.
- August – Brian Whelahan, Offaly hurler.
- 6 September – Dolores O'Riordan, rock singer-songwriter with The Cranberries (d. 2018).
- 7 October – Johnny Dooley, Offaly hurler, manager.
- 24 October – Dervla Kirwan, actress.
- 30 October – Stephen Kenny, football player and manager
- 3 November – Dylan Moran, comedian, actor, and writer.
- 22 November – Kyran Bracken, rugby player
- 26 November – James McGarry, Kilkenny hurling goalkeeper.
- November – Brian Lohan, Clare hurler.
- 25 December – Noel Hogan, guitarist and songwriter.

Full date unknown
- Amanda Coogan, performance artist.
- Róisín McAliskey, political activist.

== Deaths ==
- 2 January – J. T. O'Farrell, trade union official, served in the Seanad (Senate) from 1922 to 1936 and 1948–50.
- 24 January – St John Ervine, playwright and novelist (born 1883).
- 28 January – Edward O'Connell, Cork hurler.
- 31 March – Michael Browne, Master General of the Dominicans, Cardinal (born 1887).
- 1 April – Kathleen Lonsdale, X-ray crystallographer (born 1903).
- May – Eamon Martin, a founder of Fianna Éireann and an Irish Volunteer fighting in the Easter Rising (born 1892).
- 4 May – Seamus Elliott, road bicycle racer (born 1934).
- 10 May – Archie Heron, trade union organiser.
- 11 May
  - Seán Lemass, Fianna Fáil TD, Cabinet minister and taoiseach (born 1899).
  - Eamon Martin, one of founders of Fianna Éireann, and an Irish Volunteer who fought in the Easter Rising (born 1893).
- 15 May – Tyrone Guthrie, theatrical director (born 1900).
- 13 June – Máiréad Ní Ghráda, poet and playwright.
- 14 June – Gerard Dillon, artist and painter (born 1916).
- 14 August – Shane Leslie, diplomat and writer (born 1885).
- 15 September – John Desmond Bernal, scientist (born 1901).
- 26 September – Conor Maguire, Chief Justice of Ireland (born 1889).
- 2 October – Paddy Ahern, Cork hurler (born 1900).
- 3 October – Seán Ó Riada, composer and musician (born 1931).
- 16 December – Richard Mulcahy, Chief of Staff, TD, Cabinet minister and former leader of the Fine Gael party (born 1886).

== See also ==
- 1971 in Irish television
