= 1982 in Ireland =

- Centuries: 18th; 19th; 20th; 21st
- Decades: 1960s; 1970s; 1980s; 1990s; 2000s
- See also: 1982 in Northern Ireland; Other events of 1982; List of years in Ireland

Events from the year 1982 in Ireland.

== Incumbents ==
- President: Patrick Hillery
- Taoiseach:
  - Garret FitzGerald (FG) (until 9 March 1982)
  - Charles Haughey (FF) (from 9 March 1982 until 14 December 1982)
  - Garret FitzGerald (FG) (from 14 December 1982)
- Tánaiste:
  - Michael O'Leary (Lab) (until 9 March 1982)
  - Ray MacSharry (FF) (from 9 March 1982 until 14 December 1982)
  - Dick Spring (Lab) (from 14 December 1982)
- Minister for Finance:
  - John Bruton (FG) (until 9 March 1982)
  - Ray MacSharry (FF) (from 9 March 1982 until 14 December 1982)
  - Alan Dukes (FG) (from 14 December 1982)
- Chief Justice: Tom O'Higgins
- Dáil:
  - 22nd (until 27 January 1982)
  - 23rd (from 9 March 1982 until 4 November 1982)
  - 24th (from 14 December 1982)
- Seanad:
  - 15th (until 16 April 1982)
  - 16th (from 13 May 1982 until 21 December 1982)

== Events ==
- 21 January – Kildare TD, Charlie McCreevy, was expelled from the Fianna Fáil parliamentary party for criticising Charles Haughey.
- 27 January – Garret FitzGerald's Fine Gael-Labour government was defeated 82–81 on its budget; the 22nd Dáil was dissolved.
- 1 February – Corporal punishment was banned in schools.
- 18 February – General election: Fianna Fáil was the largest party.
- 9 March – 23rd Dáil assembled; Charles Haughey was elected Taoiseach.
- 12 March – The country's first crematorium was officially opened at Glasnevin Cemetery in Dublin.
- 6 April – James Prior launched 'rolling devolution' for Northern Ireland.
- 28 April – Work began on the Cork–Dublin natural gas pipeline.
- 2 May – The Government affirmed its neutrality in the Falklands war between the United Kingdom and Argentina, and opposed European Economic Community sanctions against Argentina (as did Italy).

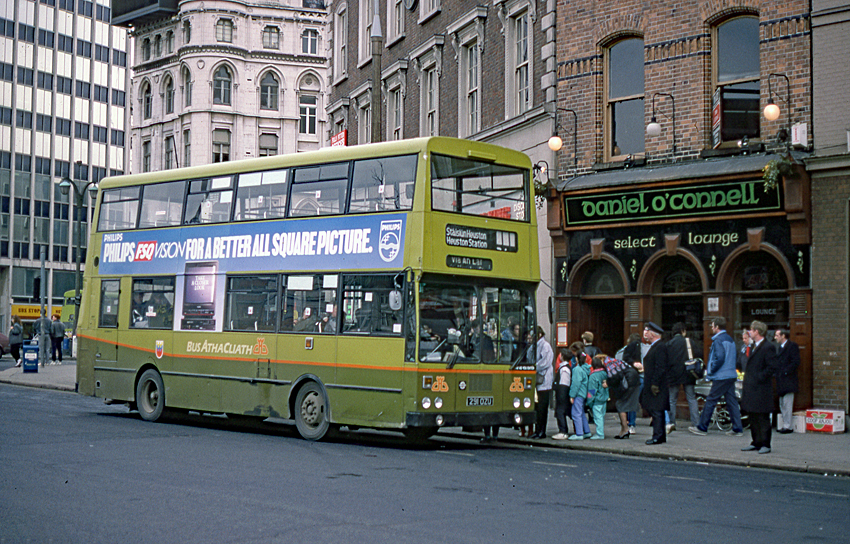
Córas Iompair Éireann bought 187 Bombardier buses during 1982 (Bombardier KD bus pictured in 1988)

- 10 May – Seamus Mallon of the Social Democratic and Labour Party was appointed to Seanad Éireann.
- 24 May – Twenty thousand people across the country marched to protest against income tax and Pay Related Social Insurance changes.
- 20 July – The Irish Republican Army killed ten servicemen in bomb attacks in Hyde Park and Regent's Park in London.
- 16 August – The Attorney General Patrick Connolly resigned after a wanted double-murderer was found staying on his property; the ensuing scandal was later described as being "grotesque, unbelievable, bizarre and unprecedented" by Taoiseach Charles Haughey.
- 28 August – The Frank Sherwin Bridge in Dublin was opened by the Lord Mayor of Dublin Dan Browne
- 6 October – Taoiseach Charles Haughey won a majority of 58 votes to 22 in an open ballot on Charlie McCreevy's motion of no confidence in his leadership.
- 15 October – Cork Airport celebrated its 21st birthday. The airport had yet to make a profit.
- 20 October – Polling took place in the Northern Ireland Assembly election. Sinn Féin won its first five seats in the Assembly, with Gerry Adams representing Belfast West.
- 27 October – Pte Michael McAleavey, an Irish Army soldier on service with UNIFIL in South Lebanon, murdered three of his colleagues: Pte Peter Burke, Pte Thomas Murphy, and Cpl Gary Morrow.
- 1 November - A newly designed £50 note was launched featuring a portrait of musician Turlough O'Carolan.
- 2 November – Former leader of the Labour Party, Michael O'Leary, joined the Fine Gael Party.
- 4 November – The government lost a confidence motion in the Dáil by 82 votes to 80. President Hillery dissolved the 23rd Dáil.
- 24 November – General election: Fine Gael was the largest party.
- 1 December – Grafton Street in Dublin officially became a pedestrianised street.
- 6 December – Ballykelly disco bombing: The Irish National Liberation Army killed 17 people in a bomb attack at the Droppin Well Inn, Ballykelly, County Londonderry.
- 8-24 December – Córas Iompair Éireann began a "free inner city shuttle service" for Christmas shoppers in Dublin city, sponsored by the City Centre Business Association, operating between 11.00 and 16.00 hours. The service was introduced the previous year.
- 14 December – The 24th Dáil assembled; Garret FitzGerald was elected Taoiseach.
- Córas Iompair Éireann purchased 187 Bombardier buses during the year, bringing the total on Dublin city services to 276 by the end of 1982. The buses became "synonymous with Dublin" during the 1980s and 1990s and were discontinued in 2001.

=== Full date unknown ===
- Rice Bridge replaced Redmond Bridge in Waterford City.

== Arts and literature ==
- 11 March – Frank McGuinness's first play, The Factory Girls, set in a Donegal shirt factory, was premiered on the Abbey Theatre's Peacock stage in Dublin.
- 22 April – Graham Reid's play The Hidden Curriculum, set in West Belfast, was premiered on the Peacock Stage of the Abbey Theatre in Dublin.
- 16 June (Bloomsday) – Ulysses broadcast: RTÉ Radio transmitted an uninterrupted, unabridged, 30-hour dramatised performance of James Joyce's novel Ulysses to mark the centenary of the author's birth. The marathon broadcast won a Jacob's Award.
- 24 July – The second Slane Concert took place with The Rolling Stones, The J. Geils Band, The Chieftains, and George Thorogood and the Destroyers playing at Slane Castle.
- 30 July - The second and final Occasion at the Castle music festival takes place in Castlebar, County Mayo.
- September – Medbh McGuckian was awarded the Rooney Prize for Irish Literature, with a special prize to Seán Ó Tuama and Thomas Kinsella for An Duanaire / Poems of the Dispossessed. McGuckian's poetry collection The Flower Master was published this year.
- Maeve Binchy's first novel Light a Penny Candle was published.
- Unlicensed operator Radio Nova began broadcasting in Dublin.

== Sport ==
=== Gaelic football ===
- Kerry were denied a fifth consecutive All-Ireland Senior Football Championship title by Offaly in a famous final.

=== Golf ===
- The Irish Open was won by Irishman John O'Leary.

=== Hurling ===
- Kilkenny won the All-Ireland Senior Hurling Championship.

=== Rugby ===
- The Ireland rugby team won the Triple Crown Ireland for the first time since 1949 by beating Scotland 21–12 on 21 February, having already beaten Wales and England.

== Births ==
=== January to June ===
- 22 January – Alan McDermott, soccer player.
- 10 February – Keith Dunne, soccer player.
- 11 February – John Melligan, soccer player.
- 18 February – Damien Hayes, Galway hurler.
- 6 March – J. J. Delaney, Kilkenny hurler.
- 4 April – Robbie Hedderman, soccer player.
- 6 April – Philip Byrne, soccer player.
- 27 April – Cliff Byrne, soccer player.
- 27 April – Stephen O'Flynn, soccer player.
- 5 May – Noel O'Leary, Cork Gaelic footballer.
- 10 May – Alan Keely, soccer player (d. 2021).
- 20 May – Wes Hoolahan, soccer player.
- 19 June – Jackie Tyrrell, Kilkenny hurler.

=== July to December ===
- 13 July – James Masters, Cork Gaelic footballer.
- 20 July – Aidan Fogarty, Kilkenny hurler.
- 21 July – Brian Murphy, Cork hurler.
- 29 July – Andy Reid, soccer player.
- 31 July – Alan O'Hare, soccer player.
- 5 August – John Lester, soccer player.
- 10 September – Andrew Murray, boxer.

=== Full date unknown ===
- Graham Callinan, Cork hurler.
- Sarah Flannery, winner of the 1999 Esat Young Scientist Exhibition.
- Peter Lawlor, Limerick hurler.
- Kevin McMahon, Cork Gaelic footballer.
- Damian Reale, Limerick hurler.
- Pat Tobin, Limerick hurler.

== Deaths ==
- 1 January – Michael Hilliard, Fianna Fáil TD, Cabinet Minister and MEP (born 1903).
- 16 January – Sir Basil Goulding, 3rd Baronet, cricketer, squash player and art collector (born 1909).
- 5 February – George Crothers, cricketer (born 1909).
- 16 February – Vivion de Valera, barrister, managing director of The Irish Press, Fianna Fáil TD representing Dublin North-West (born 1910).
- 3 March – Con Cottrell, Cork hurler (born 1917).
- 18 March – Patrick Smith, TD and Cabinet Minister (born 1901).
- 26 March – Sam Kydd, actor (born 1915).
- 26 May – Pamela Hinkson, novelist (born 1900).
- 15 June – Johnny Callanan, Fianna Fáil TD (born 1910).
- 7 July – Charles Hill, cricketer (born 1903).
- 24 August – Eoghan Ó Tuairisc, poet and writer (born 1919).
- 13 September – Mick Mackey, Limerick hurler and first recipient of the All-Time All Star Award (hurling) (born 1912).
- 5 October – Séamus Ennis, uilleann piper, singer and folk-song collector (born 1919).
- 18 November – Hilton Edwards, actor, director, co-founder of Gate Theatre (born 1903 in London).

=== Full date unknown ===
- Mick Kennefick, Cork hurler (born 1924).
- Caitlín Maude, poet, actress and traditional singer (born 1941).

== See also ==
- 1982 in Irish television
