= John Davy (cricketer) =

Irish cricketer

Cricket information
- Batting: Right-handed
- Bowling: Left-arm fast-medium

Career statistics
Competition	First-class	List A
Matches	2	4
Runs scored	55	9
Batting average	27.50	9.00
100s/50s	0/1	0/0
Top score	51*	7
Balls bowled	261	174
Wickets	5	3
Bowling average	32.80	55.33
5 wickets in innings	0	0
10 wickets in match	0	0
Best bowling	3/33	2/40
Catches/stumpings	0/–	2/–
- Source: CricketArchive, 30 December 2021

John Oliver Davy (born 1 July 1974) is a former Irish cricketer. A right-handed batsman and left-arm fast-medium bowler, he made his debut for the Ireland cricket team in a match against Scotland in July 1997 and went on to play for them in crucial matches. His last match was against Zimbabwe A in April 2000. His matches for Ireland include two first-class matches against Scotland and four with List A status. His total contribution for Ireland was 131 runs at an average of 8.73, with a top score of 51 not out against Scotland in August 1997, and 33 wickets at an average of 34.85. His best bowling figures were 4/16 against Wales in July 1997.

He represented Ireland in the 1998 European Championship and in the ICC Emerging Nations Tournament in 2000. His twin brother Peter also represented Ireland at cricket.
