= Willie Burke =

Irish footballer (born 1972)

Personal information
- Full name: Willie Burke
- Date of birth: September 4, 1972 (age 54)
- Place of birth: Dublin, Ireland
- Position: Full back

Senior career*
Years	Team	Apps	(Gls)
1992–1995	Shamrock Rovers	56	(2)
1995–2003	St Patrick's Athletic	162	(1)
- * Club domestic league appearances and goals

Willie Burke (born 4 September 1972) is an Irish former footballer.

== Career ==
He made his League of Ireland debut for Shamrock Rovers at home to Waterford United at the RDS Arena on 8 November 1992. In July 1993 he was part of a Rovers side that won an International Football Festival in Manchester.

In his second season at the club he won the League scoring once in 30 league appearances as well as making two appearances in European competition.

He signed for St Patrick's Athletic in 1995 where he stayed for eight seasons winning a further 3 League titles.

== Sources ==
- Paul Doolan; Robert Goggins. The Hoops. ISBN 0-7171-2121-6.
