= David Quinn (artist, born 1970) =

Irish artist and designer (born 1970)

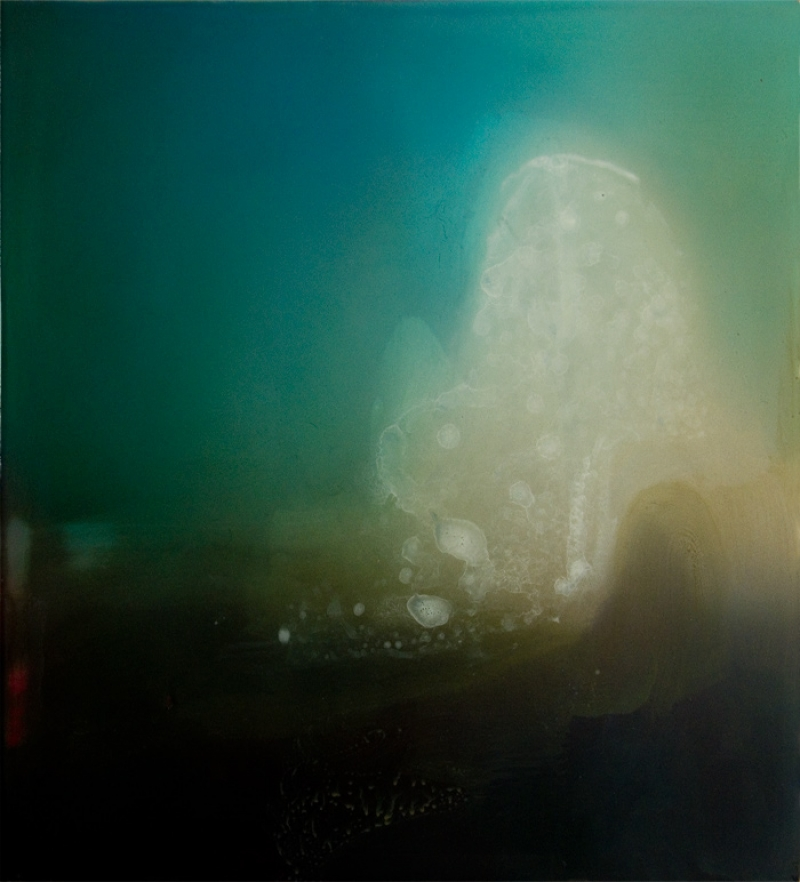
A painting titled "Grotto" by Irish artist David Quinn. Mixed media on board, 47x47cm

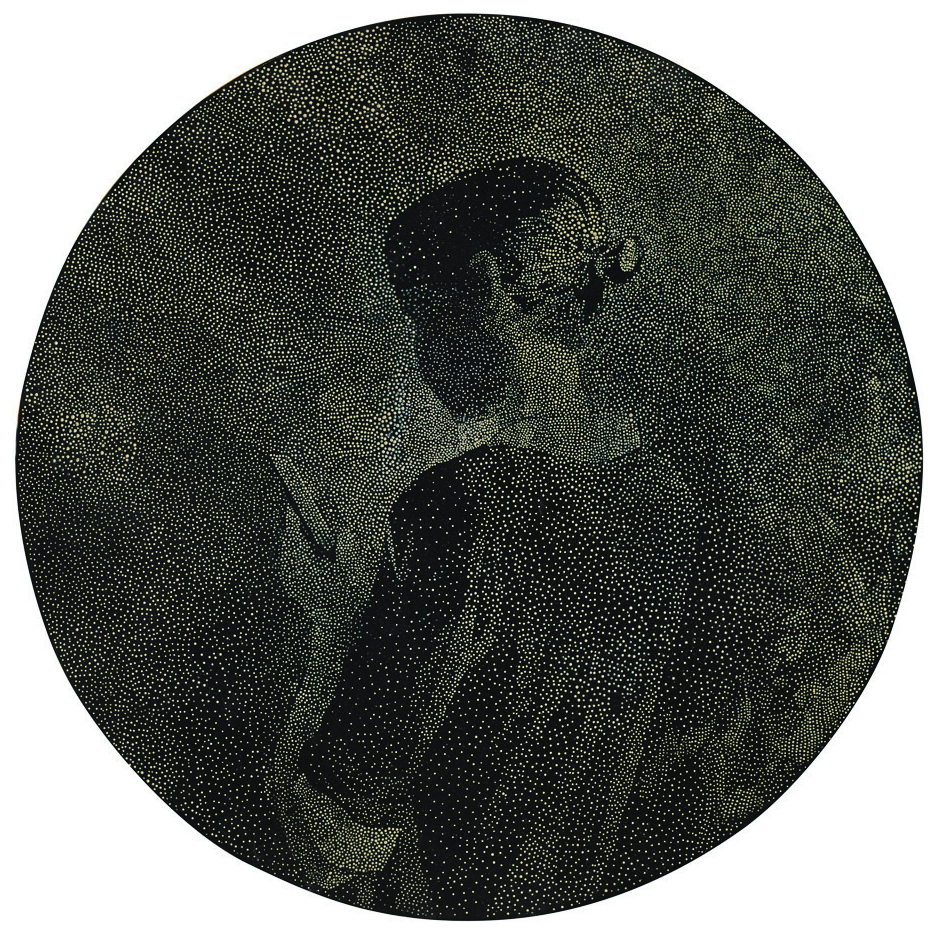
A painting titled "Phonio" by Irish artist David Quinn. Mixed media on circular panel, 100 cm diameter.

David Quinn is an Irish artist and designer who was born in County Galway in 1970 and grew up in Sligo. He studied art at the National College of Art and Design in Dublin and painted there for a number of years after graduating before finally settling in County Mayo where he currently lives and works. He is best known for his atmospheric, figurative, paintings which draw on the Mayo countryside and its vernacular architecture and gardens. The painting entitled "Grotto" is an example of his work. His paintings are represented in Irish and international collections including The Irish Museum of Modern Art, The European Parliament, AIB and the Office of Public Works.
