= Arlene Hunt =

Irish crime novelist and reviewer

- Occupations: Crime novelist; Film reviewer; Book reviewer
- Writing career
- Language: English
- Years active: 2004–present
- Genres: Crime fiction; Thriller
- Notable works: Vicious Circle; Undertow; The Chosen; The Outsider; No Escape; While She Sleeps
- Website: arlenehunt.com

Arlene Hunt is an Irish crime novelist and reviewer best known for her Dublin-set QuicK Investigations novels, featuring private investigators John Quigley and Sarah Kenny, and for stand-alone thrillers including The Chosen, The Outsider, and While She Sleeps; her novel Undertow was nominated for Best Crime Novel at the 2009 Irish Book Awards.

== Bibliography ==
Arlene Hunt has written seven crime novels: Vicious Circle (2004), False Intentions (2005), Black Sheep (2006), Missing Presumed Dead (2007), Undertow (2008), Blood Money (2010), and The Chosen (2011). Undertow was nominated for Best Crime Novel at the 2009 Irish Book Awards.
