= 1979 in Ireland =

- Centuries: 18th; 19th; 20th; 21st
- Decades: 1950s; 1960s; 1970s; 1980s; 1990s
- See also: 1979 in Northern Ireland; Other events of 1979; List of years in Ireland

Events from the year 1979 in Ireland.

== Incumbents ==
- President: Patrick Hillery
- Taoiseach:
  - Jack Lynch (FF) (until 11 December 1979)
  - Charles Haughey (FF) (from 11 December 1979)
- Tánaiste: George Colley (FF)
- Minister for Finance:
  - George Colley (FF) (until 11 December 1979)
  - Michael O'Kennedy (FF) (from 12 December 1979)
- Chief Justice: Tom O'Higgins
- Dáil: 21st
- Seanad: 14th

== Events ==
=== January ===
- 2 January – Today, the lowest temperature recorded in Ireland in the 20th century was −18.8 °C (−1.8 °F) at Lullymore, County Kildare. (The lowest on record, in 1881, was −19.1 °C.)
- 8 January – Whiddy Island Disaster: Fifty people were killed when an explosion destroyed the French oil tanker Betelgeuse at the Gulf Oil terminal on Whiddy Island in Bantry Bay.

=== March ===
- 4 March – Legendary hurler Christy Ring was buried in Cork.
- 9 March – Taxpayers across the country took to the streets to protest against the tax system.
- 20 March – A huge anti-taxation demonstration was held in Dublin.
- 30 March – Ireland ended Irish pound parity with sterling on joining the European Monetary System.

=== April ===
- 12 April – Patrick McGilligan, the last surviving member of the first government of the Irish Free State, celebrated his 90th birthday in Dublin. He died seven months later, on 15 November.
- 15 April – Three teenagers were killed and others were seriously injured while orienteering in the Glen of Imaal military training area in Country Wicklow when they accidentally triggered an unexploded shell left by the military after a training exercise.

=== May ===
- 10 May – Petrol shortages due to a crisis in the Middle East caused long delays at petrol stations in Ireland.
- 31 May – The Minister for Posts and Telegraphs, Pádraig Faulkner, launched a second national radio station, RTÉ Radio 2. The music station was intended to appeal to "women at home, motorists, workers of industry as well as many young people" and to broadcast for 19½ hours per day. Listeners heard the voice of Brendan Balfe introducing the first programme presenter, Larry Gogan, who began by playing Like Clockwork by the Boomtown Rats. The arrival of Radio 2 caused the original RTÉ Radio station to be renamed RTÉ Radio 1. In 1988, RTÉ Radio 2 was renamed 2FM, and was renamed again in 2000 as RTÉ 2FM.

=== June ===
- 2 June – Protesters opposed to the building of civic offices on the site of Viking excavations in Wood Quay, Dublin, occupied the area.
- 7 June – The first European Parliament election was held in Ireland and Northern Ireland.
- 15 June – Aer Lingus's first female pilot, Gráinne Cronin, received her wings.

=== July ===
- 14 July – In Crossmaglen, County Armagh, Gaelic Athletic Association (GAA) supporters paraded silently in protest against the British Army's commandeering of part of the local football pitch. Former GAA president Con Murphy addressed the crowd.
- 20 July – The Council for Development in Agriculture (An Chomhairle Oiliúna Talmhaíochta) was established. Its functions would later be taken over by Teagasc in 1988

=== August ===
- 9 August – The first group of Vietnamese refugees arrived in Ireland.
- 27 August
  - British retired Admiral Lord Mountbatten (a cousin to the Queen), and two 15-year-olds, his nephew and boatboy Paul Maxwell, were killed by a bomb planted on his boat in County Sligo where he was holidaying. The Dowager Lady Brabourne died the following day of her injuries.
  - Provisional Irish Republican Army (IRA) volunteers killed 18 British soldiers with two bombs in the Warrenpoint ambush.

=== September ===
- 29 September – Pope John Paul II arrived at Dublin Airport for a three-day visit to Ireland. A quarter of the population, 1.25 million people, welcomed him at a mass in the Phoenix Park. Later, he spoke to 200,000 people at Drogheda, County Louth. He returned to Dublin in the evening where 750,000 people watched his motorcade passing through the city.
- 30 September – The Pope addressed 285,000 people at a youth rally in Galway before travelling to Knock where a further 300,000 people heard him speak. He also visited Clonmacnoise.

=== October ===
- 1 October – The Pope visited the Nunciature at Maynooth College and celebrated mass before 400,000 people in Limerick. He then left Shannon Airport for Boston in the United States.

=== November ===
- 23 November – In Dublin, IRA member Thomas McMahon was sentenced to life imprisonment for the murder of Lord Mountbatten.
- 29 November – Taoiseach Jack Lynch greeted European Economic Community heads of government as they arrived for a summit meeting at Dublin Castle.

=== December ===
- 5 December – Jack Lynch announced his resignation as Taoiseach and leader of Fianna Fáil. He had led the party for thirteen years, spending nine as Taoiseach.
- 7 December
  - Charles Haughey was elected leader of the Fianna Fáil party.
  - The new headquarters of the Central Bank of Ireland were officially opened on Dame Street in Dublin.
- 11 December
  - Charles Haughey was elected Taoiseach by Dáil Éireann.
  - Máire Geoghegan-Quinn was appointed Minister for the Gaeltacht, the first woman to hold an Irish cabinet post since the First Dáil.
- 31 December – 1979 was the worst year ever for industrial disputes in Ireland, costing the economy over 1,460,000 working days.
- Undated – The Central Bank of Ireland postponed the issue of a new £20 note, blue in colour, bearing an image of the poet W. B. Yeats until January 1980, due to financial problems.

== Full date unknown ==
- Due to pressure from a campaign called 'Bring Back the Bike' and a cycling news sheet called The Bike Way, Dublin Corporation committed to build the city's first two cycle ways: the first along a section of the Grand Canal between Davitt Road and Basin Street (one mile in length), and another from the Bull Wall in Clontarf, through Fairview to the East Wall Road (three miles).

== Arts and literature ==
- 17 March – Bob Quinn's feature film, Poitín, starring Cyril Cusack and made entirely in Irish, premièred on RTÉ Television.
- 21 July – The Boomtown Rats' single, "I Don't Like Mondays", written by Bob Geldof, was released in the United Kingdom.
- The Crawford Art Gallery was established as a separate institution in the former Cork Customs House upon the relocation of the Crawford College of Art and Design.
- Dublin City Council's Civic Offices, designed in brutalist style by Sam Stephenson.
- Thomas Flanagan's novel, The Year of the French, was published.
- John McGahern's novel, The Pornographer, was published.
- Kate Cruise O'Brien was awarded the Rooney Prize for Irish Literature for her short stories, A Gift Horse.

== Sport ==
=== Athletics ===
- John Treacy won the world cross-country championship for the second time.

=== Golf ===
- The Carroll's Irish Open tournament was won by Mark James (England).

== Births ==
- 14 January – Richard Sadlier, association footballer.
- 16 January – Conor Cusack, Cork hurler.
- 18 January – Leo Varadkar, Taoiseach and medical doctor.
- 21 January – Brian O'Driscoll, captain of the Irish rugby union national team and captain of British & Irish Lions tour to New Zealand in 2005.
- 25 January – Ben O'Connor, Cork hurler.
- 25 January – Jerry O'Connor, Cork hurler.
- 31 January – Emmett J. Scanlan, actor.
- 8 February – Martin Rowlands, English-born Irish association footballer.
- 2 March – Damien Duff, association footballer.
- 14 March – Gary Duggan, playwright.
- 20 March – Amy Huberman, actress and writer.
- 24 March – Donncha O'Callaghan, Rugby player.
- 6 April – Michael Kavanagh, Kilkenny hurler.
- 13 April – Tony Lundon, dancer and singer.
- 13 April – Síle Seoige, television presenter.
- 8 May – Mark Boyle, writer.
- 9 May – Barry Quinn, association footballer.
- 14 May – Ruby Walsh, National Hunt jockey.
- 15 May – Mary Goode, hockey player.
- 18 May – Justin Sheriff, hockey player.
- 29 May – Andy Kirk, association footballer.
- 30 May – Colm Foley, association footballer.
- 31 May – Kieran O'Connor, Cork Gaelic footballer (died 2020).
- 13 June – Alan Quinn, association footballer.
- 16 June – Declan O'Brien, association footballer.
- 5 July – Shane Filan, lead singer with Westlife.
- 31 July – Damian Lynch, association footballer.
- 1 August – Bernadette Flynn, dancer.
- 16 August – Brian Ormond, singer and television host.
- 28 August – Caoimhín Ó Raghallaigh, fiddle player.
- 1 September
  - James O'Connor, association footballer.
  - Neil Ronan, Cork hurler.
- 3 September – Kieran O'Reilly, actor.
- 16 September – Barry Geraghty, jockey.
- 21 September – Richard Dunne, association footballer.
- 9 October – Chris O'Dowd, comedian and actor.
- 4 October – Caitríona Balfe, actress.
- 17 October – Leigh Arnold, actress.
- 20 October – Paul O'Connell, international rugby player.
- 20 October – Brian Begley, Limerick hurler.
- 1 November – Henry Shefflin, Kilkenny hurling player.
- 9 November – Thos Foley, slalom skier.
- 12 November – Cian O'Connor, equestrian.
- 22 November – Chris Doran, singer.
- 24 November – Kirsteen O'Sullivan, television presenter.
- 25 November – David Freeman, association footballer.
- 1 December – Pearse O'Neill, Cork Gaelic footballer.
- 9 December – Stephen McPhail, association footballer.
- 20 December – David Forde, association footballer.
- 21 December – Mike Ross, rugby union player
- 31 December – Elaine Cassidy, actress.

Full date unknown
- Raymond Daniels, Wicklow Gaelic footballer (died 2008).
- Cathy Davey, alternative rock singer-songwriter.
- Neil Delamere, comedian.
- Ross McDonnell, filmmaker and photographer (died 2023).

== Deaths ==
- 20 January – Bill McCracken, association footballer and football manager (born 1883).
- 21 January – T. C. Kingsmill Moore, senior counsel, represented Dublin University in the Seanad from 1943 to 1948 (born 1893).
- 16 February – Jack Barrett, hurler (Kinsale, Cork, Munster) (born 1910).
- 2 March – Christy Ring, hurler (Glen Rovers, Cork, Munster) (born 1920).
- 18 April – Seán Brosnan, barrister, Fianna Fáil party Teachta Dála (TD) and Senator (born 1916).
- 14 May – Peter Kerley, radiologist (born 1900).
- 25 May – Desmond Clarke, librarian and writer (born 1907).
- 29 May – Henry Coyle, Cumann na nGaedheal party TD.
- 2 August – John Leydon, Secretary, Department of Industry and Commerce.
- 11 August – J. G. Farrell, novelist (born 1935).
- 4 June – James Hamilton, 4th Duke of Abercorn, soldier and politician (born 1904).
- 10 August – Joseph O'Doherty, Sinn Féin member of parliament, Fianna Fáil TD and senator (born 1891).
- 10 September – Daniel Costigan, former Garda Síochána Commissioner.
- 15 November – Patrick McGilligan, Cumann na nGaedheal/Fine Gael TD and cabinet minister (born 1889).
- 17 December – Harold Jackson, cricketer (born 1888).
