= Peter Davy =

Irish cricketer

Cricket information
- Batting: Right-handed

Career statistics
Competition	First-class	List A
Matches	2	8
Runs scored	29	200
Batting average	7.25	28.57
100s/50s	0/0	0/2
Top score	21	60*
Catches/stumpings	2/–	2/–
- Source: CricketArchive, 30 December 2021

Peter Joseph Davy (born 1 July 1974) is an Irish cricketer. A right-handed batsman, he made his debut for the Ireland cricket team in a match against Scotland in August 1995, and went on to play for them 44 times in all, his last match coming against an England amateur team in July 2002.

Of his matches for Ireland, two had first-class status and eight had List A status. In all matches for Ireland he scored exactly 1000 runs at an average of 23.26 including two centuries, the highest of which was an innings of 132 against the MCC at Lord's in August 1999.

He represented Ireland in the 2001 ICC Trophy, the 2000 ICC Emerging Nations Tournament and the European Championship in 2002. His twin brother John also represented Ireland at cricket.
