= John Leonard (Gaelic footballer) =

Dublin Gaelic football goalkeeper

Personal information
- Native name: Seán Ó Loinín (Irish)
- Born: 20 October 1976 (age 50) Malahide, County Dublin

Sport
- Sport: Gaelic football
- Position: Goalkeeper
Club
- Years: Club
- 1995–: St Sylvester's
Inter-county
- Years: County
- 1997–: Dublin
Inter-county titles
- Leinster titles: 1

John Leonard (born 20 October 1976) is a Gaelic footballer who played for the St Sylvester's club and the Dublin county team.

He was born in Dublin, Ireland. As a child he played for Na Phiarsaigh in Baldoyle and later for St Sylvester's, where he remains. In his early 20s he was also called up and played for the Dublin junior football team, until it was suspended after a violent on-pitch brawl. He was previously the reserve goalkeeper for the Dublin senior football team. Leonard was on Dublin's winning team for the 2008 O'Byrne Cup winning team which defeated Longford in the final.
