= Eddie Ingram =

Irish cricketer (1910–1973)

Cricket information
- Batting: Right-handed
- Bowling: Right-arm medium; Leg spin

International information
- National side: Ireland

Career statistics
Competition	First-class
Matches	31
Runs scored	766
Batting average	15.01
100s/50s	0/2
Top score	64
Balls bowled	6,105
Wickets	79
Bowling average	24.00
5 wickets in innings	1
10 wickets in match	0
Best bowling	5/48
Catches/stumpings	11/–
- Source: CricketArchive, 16 November 2022

Edward Ingram (14 August 1910 – 13 March 1973) was an Irish cricketer. A right-handed batsman and right-arm medium pace/leg spin bowler, he played 48 times for the Ireland cricket team between 1928 and 1953 including nineteen first-class matches. He also played county cricket for Middlesex, playing twelve times between 1938 and 1949.

== Playing career ==
Ingram was educated at Belvedere College in Dublin. He made his debut for the Ireland cricket team against the MCC in a first-class match ten days before his 18th birthday. He continued to play in the Ireland team, mainly playing against the MCC and Scotland in addition to internationals against Australia and New Zealand.

He began playing for Middlesex in 1938, making his debut in a County Championship match against Worcestershire. He was never a regular in the Middlesex side, which allowed him to continue playing for Ireland, his career interrupted only by the Second World War. He played for Ireland against various English county teams, also playing internationals against Scotland, South Africa and India.

His last game for Middlesex came in June 1949 against Glamorgan, and his last first-class match was for Ireland against Scotland in July 1953 at the age of 42. This was also his last match overall for Ireland.

== Statistics ==
In all matches for Ireland, Ingram scored 1628 runs at an average of 20.10, scoring ten half-centuries with a top score of 83 against the MCC in August 1935. He took 151 wickets at an average of 20.12, taking five wickets in an innings seven times, and ten in a match once, with best innings bowling figures of 7/83 against Australia in September 1938. He captained Ireland eight times.

In first-class cricket, he scored 766 runs at an average of 15.01, scoring two fifties with a top score of 64 for Ireland against Scotland. He took 79 wickets at an average of 24.00 with best bowling figures of 5/48 for Ireland against Scotland. For Middlesex his top score was 28 and his best bowling was 3/7.
