= John Byrne (cricketer) =

Irish cricketer (born 1972)

Personal information
- Full name: John Edward Byrne
- Born: 17 January 1972 (age 54); Dublin, Leinster, Ireland
- Batting: Right-handed

Domestic team information
- Years: Team
- 1997: Ireland

Career statistics
Competition	First-class
Matches	1
Runs scored	19
Batting average	19.00
100s/50s	–/–
Top score	12*
Catches/stumpings	1/–
- Source: Cricinfo, 2 January 2022

John Edward Byrne (born 17 January 1972 in Dublin) is a former Irish cricketer. A right-handed batsman, he played three times for Ireland in 1997, including one first-class match against Scotland. He has not played for Ireland since.
