= Owen Butler =

Irish cricketer (born 1975)

Cricket information
- Batting: Right-handed
- Bowling: Right-arm fast

Career statistics
Competition	First-class	List A
Matches	1	6
Runs scored	–	12
Batting average	–	6.00
100s/50s	–	0/0
Top score	–	8
Balls bowled	54	348
Wickets	0	8
Bowling average	–	34.00
5 wickets in innings	–	0
10 wickets in match	–	0
Best bowling	–	3/53
Catches/stumpings	0/–	1/–
- Source: CricketArchive, 30 December 2021

Owen Fintan Xavier Butler (born 15 September 1975) is an Irish cricketer. He is a right-handed batsman and a right-arm fast bowler.

He made his debut for Ireland in June 1994 against the MCC. His List A debut came the following year in a Benson and Hedges Cup match against Surrey. His only first-class match was against Scotland in August 1996.

He was then absent from the Irish team for almost four years before making a comeback in the ICC Emerging Nations tournament in Zimbabwe in April 2000. Later that year, he played in the European Championship, the match against Italy being his twelfth and, to date, last match for Ireland.
