= Edward Moore (Irish cricketer) =

Irish cricketer (1970–2021)

Personal information
- Full name: Edward Robert Moore
- Born: 2 March 1970; Dublin, Ireland
- Died: 5 February 2021 (aged 50); Dublin, Ireland
- Batting: Right-handed
- Bowling: Left-arm fast-medium

International information
- National side: Ireland (1991–1995)
- Source: CricketArchive, 15 March 2016

Edward Robert Moore (2 March 1970 – 5 February 2021) was an Irish international cricketer who represented the Irish national side between 1991 and 1995.

A left-arm pace bowler, Moore made his senior debut for Ireland in July 1991, on a tour of England. His first-class debut came in June 1993, against Scotland, and the following month he also represented Ireland in the 1993 NatWest Trophy (an English domestic competition). At the 1994 ICC Trophy in Kenya, Moore appeared in four of his team's seven matches, taking five wickets. His best figures, 3/39 from ten overs, came against the Netherlands, while against Malaysia he took 1/17 from 9.2 overs. Moore's final matches for Ireland came in August 1995, when they played a brief series against Scotland after the 1995 British Isles Championship.

He died in February 2021 at the age of 50, twenty five days short from his 51st birthday.
