= James Kempster =

Irish cricketer

Personal information
- Full name: James Francis Kempster
- Born: 15 October 1892; Ranelagh, Dublin, Ireland
- Died: 21 April 1975 (aged 82); Kilternan, County Dublin, Ireland
- Batting: Right-handed
- Bowling: Right-arm medium

Domestic team information
- Years: Team
- 1920–1922: Ireland

Career statistics
Competition	First-class
Matches	2
Runs scored	55
Batting average	13.75
100s/50s	–/–
Top score	33
Balls bowled	18
Wickets	0
Bowling average	–
5 wickets in innings	–
10 wickets in match	–
Best bowling	–
Catches/stumpings	–/–
- Source: Cricinfo, 2 January 2022

James Francis Kempster (15 October 1892 in County Dublin, Ireland – 21 April 1975 in County Dublin) was an Irish cricketer. A right-handed batsman and right-arm medium pace bowler, he played two first-class matches for the Ireland cricket team against Scotland in the 1920s, scoring a total of 55 runs in his four innings.
