= John F. Kennedy Arboretum =

Arboretum in County Wexford, Ireland

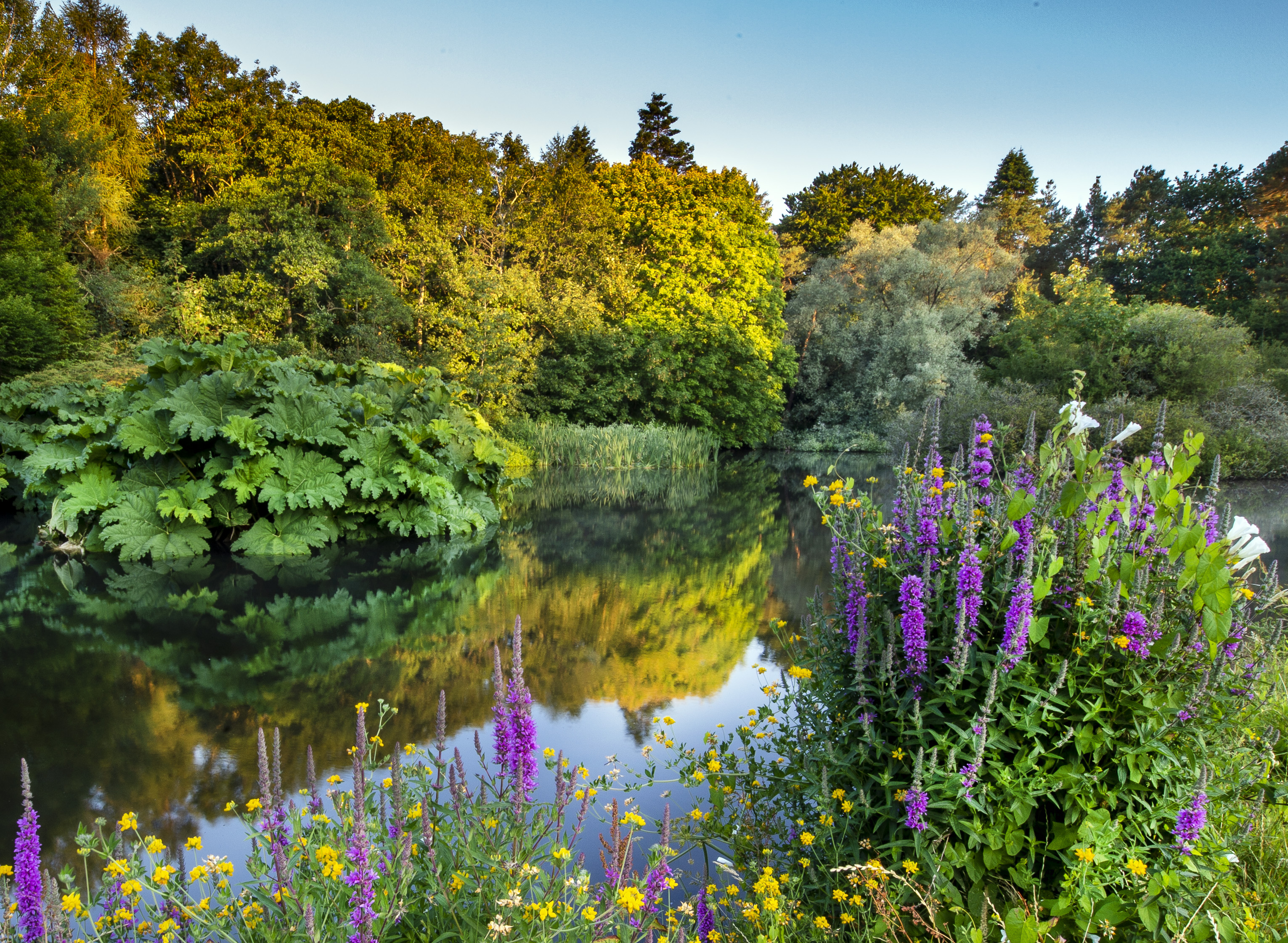
Sunrise at the lake

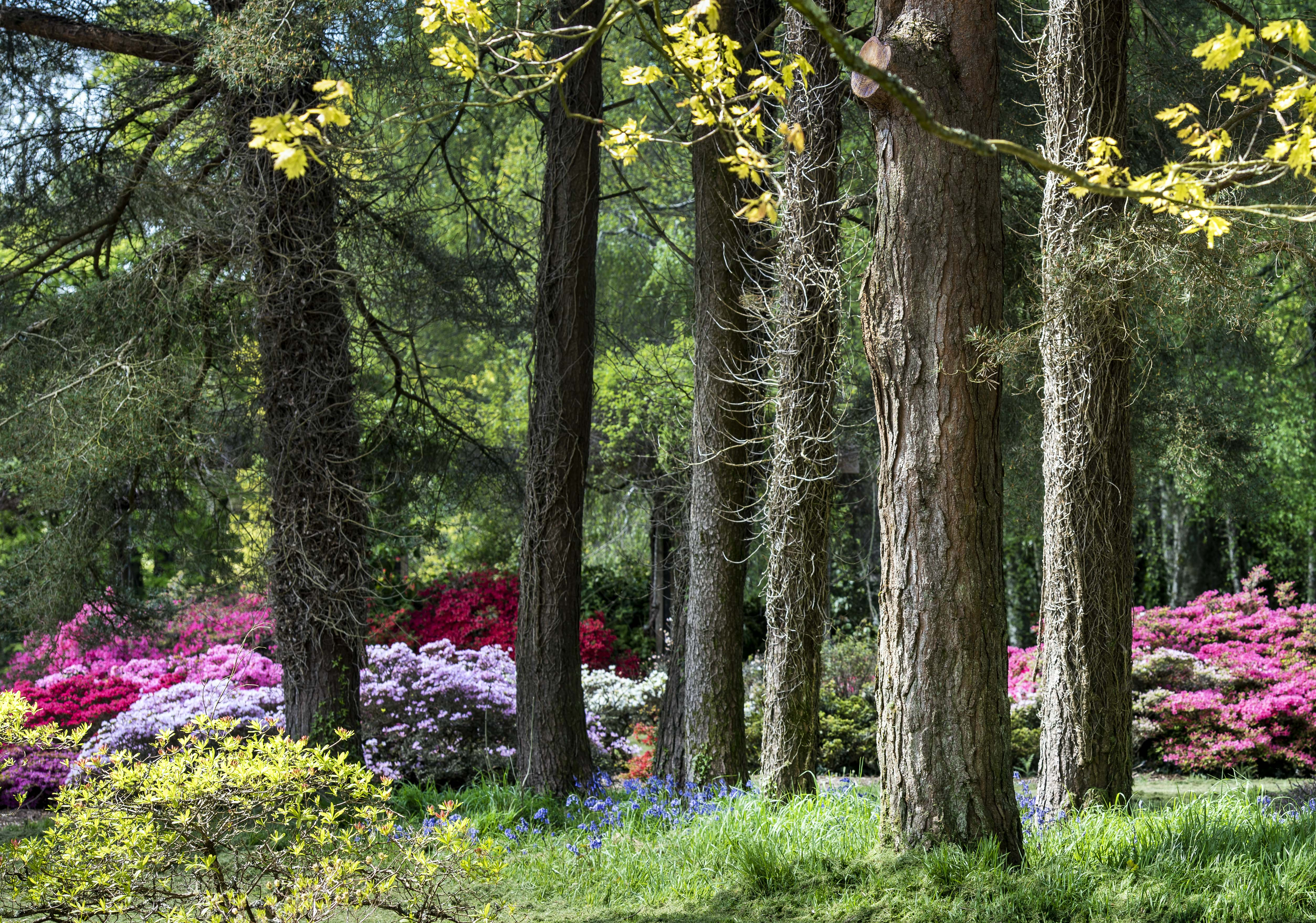
The ericaceous garden has more than a thousand varieties of rhododendron and heather, making it one of the most colourful sites in the arboretum in spring.

The John F. Kennedy Arboretum, on the Hook Head peninsula near New Ross, County Wexford, Ireland, is a park under public administration (owned by the Office of Public Works, managed by the National Botanic Gardens of Ireland), and a research collection of more than 5,000 varieties of tree and shrub. It is the largest such collection, by far, in Ireland.

== History ==
President Kennedy's visit to Ireland in June 1963 was a pivotal moment in modern history and one that ignited the spirit of the nation. A key point of the President's trip was when he visited the family homestead (now JFK Homestead) to have tea with his Irish cousins. Following his untimely death, a number of Irish-American societies wished to establish a memorial forest as a living tribute to him in Ireland. The Irish government suggested this take the form of a national arboretum, and sufficient funds were raised to purchase the lands, close to the Kennedy homestead, outright.

The Irish government undertook to develop and maintain the arboretum. A planning committee was established between the Forestry Division and the National Botanic Gardens to plan the content and layout of the arboretum and the Office of Public Works, which had the responsibility for providing the buildings, roads and services. The committee visited arboreta and botanic gardens in North America and Europe, to study state of the art methods of both arranging and managing such a collection. Twenty-two countries, with which Ireland had diplomatic relations, each sent gifts of trees and shrubs representative of their country to the arboretum. The main source of plants used in the arboretum has been from reputable nurseries that could authenticate the source of their material. Plants, cuttings and seed are also received as gifts or by exchange from other arboreta or botanic gardens.

The JFK Arboretum was opened formally by President de Valera on 29 May 1968.

In 2013 the John F. Kennedy Arboretum came under the management of the National Botanic Gardens of Ireland.

== Collection and operation ==
Dedicated to the memory of John Fitzgerald Kennedy (35th President of the United States from 1960 to 1963) the Arboretum is a tree collection of international standing. Located in the southeast corner of Ireland, 12 km (7.5 mi) south of New Ross, it covers 252 ha and rises from 36 m (118 ft) at its southern boundary to 271 m (889 ft) at the summit of Sliabh Coillte, a prominent hill overlooking the Kennedy ancestral home at Dunganstown. Today the arboretum contains over 5,000 types of trees and shrubs from all temperate regions of the world, planted in botanical sequence. It is the largest collection of catalogued trees in the country. The aim was to maintain a comprehensive, scientifically based and fully documented arboretum, with ancillary collections and information services and ultimately, to become Ireland's National Arboretum.

Conservation and research elements of the arboretum are represented by a set of provenance plots where six species of conifers and various Elm adaptability trials are taking place; forestry plots, where 220 taxa of forest trees are grown in plots and for which growth data is carefully compiled. Collections of special note include an ericaceous garden with over 500 different rhododendrons and azaleas, a plant collection devoted to famed Irish plant hunter Augustine Henry, a slow-growing conifer grove, a phenological garden as well as substantial collections of Acer, Quercus, Prunus, Viburnum, Berberis, and Betula.

Today the arboretum has taken on an even more significant role in providing a sanctuary to threatened tree species. In 2022 over 10 acres of new planting will establish some of the world's most endangered conifers at the arboretum. Consisting of 1300 trees, representing 24 endangered conifer species the planting will be the single largest planted collection of the International Conifer Conservation Programme (ICCP).

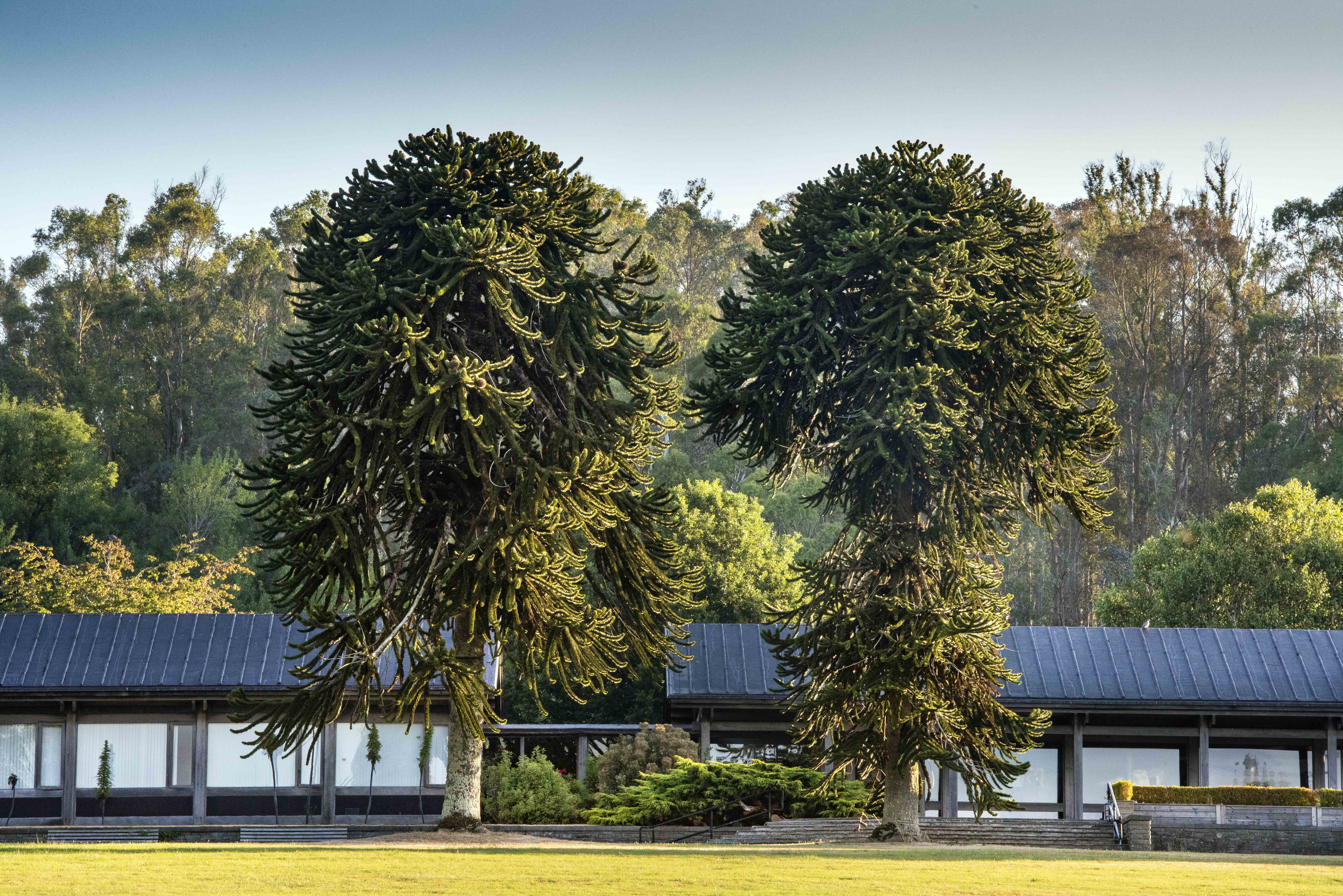
A pair of Monkey Puzzle trees (Araucaria araucana) on the main vista outside the JFK Arboretum visitors centre
