= Irish bank strikes (1966–1976) =

Series of strikes at major banks in Ireland

The Irish bank strikes between 1966 and 1976 were three strikes of about a year's total duration which closed down all the clearing banks in Ireland. The strikes provided economists with a unique opportunity to study the functioning of a modern economy without access to bank deposits. Despite the significantly reduced access to bank deposits, the economy continued to grow, with cheques being widely employed in lieu of cash. A 2026 study found that the 1966 strike was "associated with a shortfall in economic activity that punctuated a decade of robust growth. The qualitative evidence depicts the struggles of households and firms managing a credit crunch, a liquidity shock, and rising transaction costs."

The strikes lasted from May 7 – July 30, 1966, May 1 – November 17, 1970, and June 28 – September 6, 1976. The strikes affected all the associated banks: the Bank of Ireland, the Allied Irish Banks, the Northern Bank, and the Ulster Bank. These four banks accounted for about 60% of total bank deposits in the country as of 1970.

== 1970 strike ==
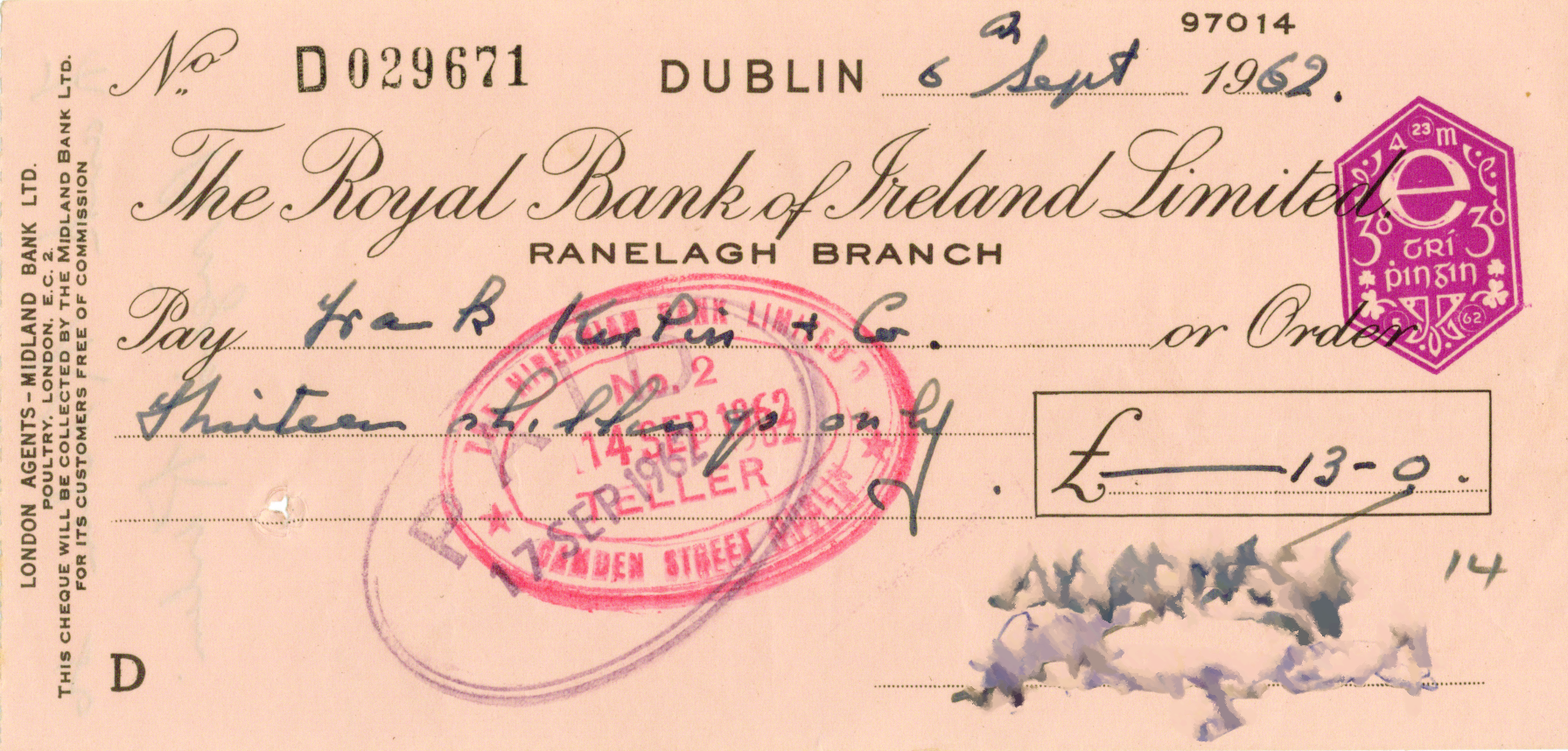
A 1962 cheque drawn on the Royal Bank of Ireland, which was merged into Allied Irish Banks

Beginning on May 1, 1970, workers at Ireland's four associated banks (the Bank of Ireland, the Allied Irish Banks, the Northern Bank, and the Ulster Bank) went on strike. At the time, these banks accounted for about 60% of the country's total bank deposits. The country's non-associated banks had significantly less deposits, and fewer branches, which were mostly concentrated in Dublin. Another large bank in Ireland, the Post Office Savings Bank, had a large amount of branches, but didn't offer full current account services.

During the 6½-month strike in 1970, the longest of the three, most transactions were financed through the trading of cheques, and at the end of the strike, the banking system had a backlog of £5 billion. The Central Bank made limited facilities available to non-associated banks to issue cash. There was an initial jump in demand for Irish pounds, although demand for the currency fell in subsequent months and, ultimately, demand did not rise considerably over the total period of the strike. This was partially due to a significant increase in pounds sterling in circulation over the course of the strike, which mostly resulted from British tourists during the summer, that was subsequently not converted into Irish pounds.

In normal banking systems, cheques are understood to be drawn against known accounts, and are cleared quickly. However, in the absence of banks providing this service, the transfer of cheques in Ireland during this time was largely built on mutual trust and information gathered from personal networks. Many retail shops and pubs had a lot of information about their clientele which was used by people to evaluate their financial status. Few retailers were concerned about the prospect of a large volume of unpaid cheques. Anecdotal evidence suggests that some cheques were also passed along many times, moreso than contemporary figures showed. The type of cheques used also helped people to evaluate their risk, with cheques drawn on government and well-established institutions being seen as the most trustworthy, and were essentially treated akin to certificates of deposit. Due to the heightened demand for cheques at this time, some printing houses began printing blank cheque books for use. There is anecdotal evidence that as the supply of cheques diminished over the course of the strike, people began making cheques of their own, with some attaching postage stamps as proof of paying stamp duty. As the strike went on, a significant share of market participants reported difficulties in assessing their true financial positions. There was, however, a jump in financial fraud as a result of this, and 750 cases were investigated following the strike, although most entailed small sums of money.

Many also shifted their deposits from the associated banks on strike to non-associated banks and the Post Office Savings Bank. Non-associated banks saw a 70% increase in deposits from mid-April to mid-November, although much of this increase in deposits was reversed following the end of the strike.

When the 1970 bank strike ended, bankers received better pay, more bonuses, and more overtime due to the backlog of work which built up during their absence. Some also state that the large backlog of work which built up enabled more competition within the country's banking industry. The total amount of uncleared cheques by the end of the strike reached nearly three times Ireland's total gross domestic product. The associate banks reportedly saw a decline in profits during the period of the strike, indicating an increase in bad debts, although these did not reach a dramatic level.

== Impact ==
The overall effect of the bank strikes on the Irish economy was small. Payments continued in large part due to the circulation of cheques based on mutual trust, effectively substituting them for cash. The Central Bank of Ireland said in 1971 that "the Irish economy continued to function for a reasonably long period of time", and a study done by the Central Bank of Ireland and the Economic and Social Research Institute said that during the strike "the level of economic activity continued to increase, though at a reduced pace". The Confederation of Irish Industry reported that it "did not hear of any cases where firms had actually to stop production as a result of the bank dispute". In most months of the strikes, retail sales did not significantly diverge from expectations, although there were some months in which sales were significantly lower than expectations. After the shorter strikes in 1966 and 1976, there was an increase in retail sales after the strikes ended although this did not occur after the longer strike in 1970. One economist stated that, compared to the 1969 Irish maintenance workers' strike, the 1970 strike "amounted to no more than keeping up with the Joneses". One journalist also viewed the strikes as less significant than pre-existing economic struggles in Ireland at the time, including inflation, high unemployment, and a cement workers' strike.

International trade experienced a minimal impact from the strikes, with one survey finding that less than 10% of Irish manufacturing firms reduced imports due to payment problems associated with the 1970 strike. Many companies engaging in foreign trade kept some earnings in banks outside of Ireland, or in non-associated banks. Companies which did this often used cheques written against these deposits to pay foreign suppliers. However, as the 1970 strike went on, manufacturers found it increasingly difficult to obtain trade credit from their foreign suppliers.

One research paper stated that many factors prevented the strike from having a bad effect on the economy including that not all banks were closed, the strike did not come as a surprise, people could still use banks in Northern Ireland, the degree of familiarity between parties in transactions, the widespread use of cash and cheques, and the widespread acceptance of the Pound sterling. The paper added that these factors did not affect everyone equally as many smaller businesses and individuals did not have the resources to use non-associated banks, which had a very limited physical footprint, or to use banks outside of Ireland.

Many property deals were affected, because the documents were kept in the banks.

There was a jump in financial fraud which followed the 1970 strike as a result of the informal chequing network that developed, and 750 cases were investigated, although most were for small sums of money.

The Irish Stock Market was severely affected by the 1970 strike, as trading volumes fell by about one-third. Interest payments on government stock had to be delayed by several months.

One sizable shipping firm, Palgrave Murphy, failed around the time of the 1970 strike, although it is debated whether the strike led to this.

Lacking strike pay, some bankers temporarily moved to England for work.

A report by the Central Bank of Ireland suggested there was some evidence that investments in fixed capital were negatively affected, mostly for smaller companies.
