= 2007 All-Ireland Senior Hurling Championship final =

2007 All-Ireland Hurling Final
- Event: 2007 All-Ireland Senior Hurling Championship
Kilkenny	Limerick
2–19	1–15
- Date: 2 September 2007
- Venue: Croke Park, Dublin
- Man of the Match: Eddie Brennan
- Referee: Diarmuid Kirwan (Cork)
- Attendance: 82,127
- Weather: Cloudy; 16 °C (61 °F)

The 2007 All-Ireland Senior Hurling Championship Final was a hurling match held at Croke Park, Dublin on 2 September 2007. The match was the 120th All-Ireland hurling final and was contested by Kilkenny and Limerick, with Kilkenny winning 2–19 to 1–15. It was the first meeting of these two sides in the All-Ireland final since 1974 when Kilkenny were the winners. Kilkenny were aiming to capture a second All-Ireland title in succession while Limerick were hoping to capture a first title since 1973. The prize for the winning team was the Liam MacCarthy Cup.

Prior to the event, Kilkenny goalkeeper James McGarry's wife Vanessa died in a road accident.

== Previous championship encounters ==
This particular fixture has been infrequent in the history of the All-Ireland Senior Hurling Championship due to the provincial structure of the championship from 1888 to 1996. Kilkenny have played Limerick a total of eight times in the All-Ireland Senior Hurling Championship. As of 2007 the scores were level with both Kilkenny and Limerick recording four victories over each other.

Year	Venue	Competition	Kilkenny score	Limerick score	Match report
1897	Croke Park, Dublin	All-Ireland Hurling Final	2–4 (10)	3–4 (13)	
1933	Croke Park, Dublin	All-Ireland Hurling Final	1–7 (10)	0–6 (6)	
1935	Croke Park, Dublin	All-Ireland Hurling Final	2–5 (11)	2–4 (10)	
1936	Croke Park, Dublin	All-Ireland Hurling Final	1–5 (8)	5–6 (21)	
1940	Croke Park, Dublin	All-Ireland Hurling Final	1–7 (10)	3–7 (16)	
1973	Croke Park, Dublin	All-Ireland Hurling Final	1–14 (17)	1–21 (24)	
1974	Croke Park, Dublin	All-Ireland Hurling Final	3–19 (28)	1–13 (16)	
2005	Croke Park, Dublin	All-Ireland Hurling Quarter-Final	0–18 (18)	0–13 (13)	

== Paths to the final ==
=== Kilkenny ===
10 June
Semi-Final

Offaly	1–13 – 1–27	Kilkenny
D Murray (1–8, 8f, 1pen), B Murphy (0–2), B Carroll, M Cordial, G Hanniffy (0–1 each)		H Shefflin (0–12, 9f, 1 '65'), M Comerford, J Fitzpatrick (0–3 each), E Larkin (1–0), E Brennan, A Fogarty (0–2 each), T Walsh, JJ Delaney, D Lyng, M Fennelly, E Reid (0–1 each)

O'Moore Park, Portlaoise
Attendance: 11,490
Referee: Michael Wadding (Waterford)

1 July
Final

Wexford	1–12 – 2–24	Kilkenny
R Kehoe (0–2, 1f), E Quigley (0–1), S Nolan (1–5 3f, 1 '65), D Stamp (0–1), R Jacob (0–3).		B Hogan (0–1), J Fitzpatrick (0–2, 1f), W O'Dwyer (2–3), H Shefflin (Capt) (0–9, 4f), E Larkin (0–2) M Comerford (0–5), E Brennan (0–1).

Croke Park, Dublin
Attendance: 34,872
Referee: Pat O Connor (Limerick)

28 July
Quarter-Final

Kilkenny	3–22 – 1–18	Galway
D Lyng (0–2), J Fitzpatrick (0–3, free), E Brennan (2–2), H Shefflin (0–8, 8 frees), E Larkin (0–2), W O’Dwyer (0–1), M Comerford (0–2), A Fogarty (0–1), R Power (1–1).		C Callanan (0–1, free), F Healy (0–2), A Kerins (0–4), R Murray (1–0), I Tannian (0–1), K Wade (0–7, 6 frees, 1 '65'), N Healy (0–3).

Croke Park, Dublin
Referee: Dickie Murphy (Wexford)

5 August
Semi-Final

Wexford	1–10 – 0–23	Kilkenny
B Lambert (0–5, 2f), D Stamp, M Jacob, PJ Nolan, D O'Connor, R McCarthy (0–1 each)		H Shefflin (capt) (0–14, 9f, 1 '65'), E Larkin, M Comerford, J Fitzpatrick (0–2 each), W O'Dwyer, A Fogarty, R Power (0–1 each)

Croke Park, Dublin
Attendance: 54,924
Referee: M Haverty (Galway)

=== Limerick ===
At the start of the year Limerick were given little chance of success by most of the pundits and commentators. The last time the team won a game in the provincial championship was 2001 and few gave them any chance against Tipperary, their opponents in the Munster semi-final. 26,000 people witnessed that game with Tipp looking the likely winners. A goal from substitute Pat Tobin brought Limerick level to 1–19 late on to send the game to a replay. Early in the second half of the replay it looked as if Tipperary were going to run out the easy winners when they led by ten points. Limerick fought back to level the game by the final whistle. A period of extra time was played, however, after 160-minutes of hurling the sides couldn't be separated. Result: Tipperary 2–12 – Limerick 1–24. Eight days later both sides met for the third time. Remarkably, after the seventy minutes had been played both sides were still level and another period of extra time had to be played. After a three-game saga watched by over 80,000 people Limerick claimed their first victory in the provincial championship in six years when they won by 0–22 to 2–13. The reward for this victory was a Munster final meeting with Waterford. It was their first appearance in the provincial decider since 2001 and the first Limerick-Waterford Munster final since 1934. The game saw Waterford's Dan Shanahan run riot and capture three goals as Limerick were well beaten by 3–17 to 1–14. In spite of this Limerick still qualified for the All-Ireland quarter-final where they were drawn to play their near-neighbours Clare. Limerick were the favourites going into the game in spite of having lost quarter-finals in 2001, 2005 and 2006. The favourites tag was well justified and they won more comfortably than the 1–23 to 1–16 score line suggests. This win set up a rematch with Waterford in the All-Ireland semi-final. Having lost the Munster final to them, Waterford were the red-hot favourites going into the game. In spite of their underdog status Limerick produced an incredible display of goalpoaching to defeat Waterford by 5–11 to 2–15 in a thrilling All-Ireland semi-final. It was heart-breaking for Waterford who had to suffer a fourth defeat at the penultimate stage of the championship inside nine years.

10 June
MSHC
Semi-Final

Limerick	1–19 – 1–19	Tipperary
A O’Shaughnessy 0–6 (0–4 frees); O Moran 0–5; P Tobin 1–1; B Foley 0–3; N Moran 0–2; M O’Brien 0–2; M Fitzgerald 0–1.		W Ryan 0–7 (0–6 frees); J Carroll 1–1; D Egan 0–3; J Woodlock 0–2; E Kelly 0–2; L Corbett 0–2; R O’Dwyer, S McGrath, 0–1 each.

Gaelic Grounds, Limerick
Attendance: 36,246
Referee: D Kirwan (Cork)

16 June
MSHC
Semi-Final
Replay

Limerick	1–24 – 2–21 (AET)	Tipperary
M. Fitzgerald 1–3; A. O’Shaughnessy 0–6 (0–5 frees 0–1 65); O. Moran 0–5; N. Moran 0–3; K. Tobin 0–2; J. O’Brien 0–2; B. Geary 0–2 (frees); M. Foley 0–1.		E. Kelly 0–9 (0–6 frees); S. Butler 1–3; D. Egan 1–2; L. Corbett 0–3; B. Dunne 0–2; J. Woodlock, E. Corcoran (S/L), 0–1 each.

Semple Stadium, Thurles
Attendance: circa 27,000
Referee: Brian Gavin (Offaly)

24 June
MSHC
Semi-Final
2nd Replay

Limerick	0–22 – 2–13 (AET)	Tipperary
A. O’Shaughnessy 0–6 (0–3 frees 0–1 65); N. Moran 0–5; B. Geary 0–3 (0–1 free 0–1 65); O. Moran 0–3; M. Fitzgerald 0–2; K. Tobin 0–2; D. O’Grady 0–1.		E. Kelly 0–9 (0–7 frees); D. Egan 1–0; W. Ryan 1–0; S. Butler 0–2; S. McGrath, P. Bourke, 0–1 each.

Gaelic Grounds, Limerick
Attendance: 30,608
Referee: Seánie McMahon (Clare)

8 July
MSHC
Final

Waterford	3–17 – 1–14	Limerick
D Shanahan 3–3; E Kelly 0–4 (2f); J Mullane 0–3; S Molumphy, P Flynn (1f) 0–2 each; S Prendergast, K McGrath (f), E McGrath 0–1 each.		B Begley 1–2; M Fitzgerald, A O'Shaughnessy (2 '65's, 1f) 0–3 each; K Tobin 0–2; D O'Grady, P Tobin, O Moran, M O'Brien 0–1 each.

Semple Stadium, Thurles
Attendance: 48,371
Referee: Séamus Roche (Tipperary)

29 July
AISHC
Quarter-Final

Limerick	1–23 – 1–16	Clare
A O'Shaughnessy (0–11, 6f), M Fitzgerald (0–4), D Ryan (1–2), K Tobin (0–2), O Moran, D O'Grady, J O'Brien, B Foley (0–1 each)		N Gilligan (0–5, 5f), D McMahon (1–1), D O'Rourke, J Clancy (0–3 each), B Bugler, C Lynch (0–2 each)

Croke Park, Dublin
Attendance: 72,426
Referee: Michael Wadding (Waterford)

12 August
AISHC
Semi-Final

Limerick	5–11 – 2–15	Waterford
A O'Shaughnessy (2–7), D Ryan (2–0), B Begley (1–0), O Moran (0–2), M O'Brien, J O'Brien (0–1 each)		D Shanahan 0–4, P Flynn 0–4, E Kelly 0–3, T Browne 0–1, K McGrath 0–1, J Kennedy 0–1, S Molumphy 1–0, S Predergast 0–1, E McGrath 1–0

Croke Park, Dublin
Attendance: 80,546
Referee: S Roche (Tipperary)

== Match summary ==
=== First half ===
At 3:30 pm match referee Diarmuid Kirwan threw in the sliothar and the 2007 championship decider was on. Kilkenny justified their favouritism in the opening exchanges as they dictated the play to a Limerick side that may have had All-Ireland nerves. Kilkenny were the first team to open their scoring account courtesy of two points from a Henry Shefflin free and an Eoin Larkin effort from play. Limerick were struggling at this stage, however, Kilkenny awarded no respite to the Munster men. After eight minutes of play Kilkenny were awarded a line ball. James 'Cha' Fitzpatrick dispatched the sliothar in as far as goal-poacher supreme Eddie Brennan. He made no mistake in rounding corner-back Séamus Hickey and sending a low shot across goalkeeper Brian Murray and into the Limerick net. Less than a minute later another long delivery from Fitzpatrick found Shefflin at the edge of the square. After fielding the sliothar the Kilkenny captain made used his strength to brush past full-back Stephen Lucey and flick the sliothar into the net for a second goal. Eoin Larkin added to the Munster men's misery as he pointed once again. 10 mins: 2–3 – 0–0.

Limerick found their way after this opening bombardment with Andrew O'Shaughnessy firing over a free to open their scoring account. The 'treaty' men didn't register their first score from play until the fifteen-minute mark when Dónal O'Grady split the posts to reduce the deficit to seven. Seán O'Connor sent over a third unanswered point for Limerick shortly afterwards. Eddie Brennan was giving Séamus Hickey a torrid time in the full back line and he rifled over another point for 'the Cats' in the sixteenth minute. 16 mins: 2–4 – 0–3.

Ollie Moran was now leading the attack for Limerick and he made no mistake in sending over two quick points from play to reduce Kilkenny's lead to five points. Up at the other end of the field Henry Shefflin was having an off day as he struck some uncharacteristic wides into the canal end of the stadium. Eoin Larkin, however, was given plenty time and space to send over his third point of the game after twenty minutes. Limerick's scores were at a premium as high balls into Brian Begley proved fruitless. The loss of Noel Hickey to a hamstring injury in the twenty-third minute resulted in manager Brian Cody make some positional switches and spring John Tennyson from the substitute's bench. Almost immediately Kilkenny regained the upper hand with Eddie Brennan breaking through for what would have been his second goal. The brilliance of Séamus Hickey, however, diverted Brennan's attention and all he got was a point. Henry Shefflin nonchalantly struck over another point from all of 65 metres out while Richie Power entered the game in place of Willie O'Dwyer. 25 mins: 2–7 – 0–5.

Donie Ryan helped Limerick to get back on track when he set up Mike FitzGerald who clawed back another score for his side. His effort was cancelled out almost immediately as Eoin Larkin, who was giving a fantastic display, made an excellent catch and scored his fourth point from four attempts. A harsh foul by Tommy Walsh presented Andrew O’Shaughnessy with a simple point from a free which he converted with ease. Ollie Moran continued to get the Limerick attack back on track as he fired over his third point of the day. The Kilkenny men, however, kept their cool and restored their seven-point lead with another Eddie Brennan point after Henry Shefflin made the score. Up at the other end of the field Limerick were awarded another free after a Brian Hogan misdemeanor, however, the shot went wide. Tommy Walsh made a great run from the half-back line to register the final score of the opening half for Kilkenny. There was concern for 'the Cats' when Henry Shefflin pulled up with a suspected cruciate injury late in the half. At the half-time break Kilkenny were in complete control of the game. 35 mins: 2–10 – 0–8.

=== Second half ===
Shefflin's injury resulted in him retiring to the stands for the second-half. Andrew O’Shaughnessy opened the second-half scoring after he converted a free after a harsh 'Cha' Fitzpatrick foul. Three minutes into the half Niall Moran pointed to reduce the deficit to just the two goals as Limerick battled hard. Substitute Richie Power steadied the Leinster men when he sent over a brace of frees, however, 'Cha' Fitzpatrick was not so lucky when his two efforts flew wide of the upright. Power increased Kilkenny's lead to nine points when he landed his third unanswered point in-a-row as Kilkenny were really motoring. Limerick, however, went on the attack again and were thrown a lifeline when Ollie Moran sent a great shot past P. J. Ryan to the roof of the Kilkenny net for Limerick's first goal of the day. 47 mins: 2–13 – 1–10.

Limerick were now within six points, however, Kilkenny maintained their trademarked coolness. 'The Cats' received a great boost soon after when Tommy Walsh made a great run from his corner-back position to score his second point of the day. Andrew O’Shaughnessy popped over a point; however, the game was quickly going beyond them. 'Cha' Fitzpatrick responded in kind for Kilkenny before Aidan Fogarty provided another to reestablish an eight-point lead. 55 mins: 2–16 – 1–11.

Donal O’Grady slotted over Limerick's twelfth point of the match before his side were awarded a free from close range. Andrew O’Shaughnessy went for broke and tried for a goal, however, J.J. Delaney was the hero on the goal line who sent the sliothar out for 65-metre free. O’Shaughnessy also stepped up to take that free, however, he sent it wide. With thirteen minutes left in the game the deficit was reduced to six points as Limerick pointed from a free. Soon afterwards O’Shaughnessy went for broke again, however, his kicked effort was blocked by Jackie Tyrrell for another 65-metre free. O’Shaughnessy made no mistake this time as the sliothar sailed over the crossbar to eat into Kilkenny's lead once again.

Kilkenny fought back again with Eddie Brennan increasing his tally of the day to 1–4 when he sent the sliothar over the bar in the sixty-fourth minute. O’Shaughnessy secured a late consolation point for Limerick, however, Eddie Brennan came back to secure his fifth point of the day and the last score of the game. The final score saw Kilkenny take their thirtieth All-Ireland title with a 2–19 to 1–15 victory over Limerick.

== Match details ==
2 September 2007
15:30 UTC+1

Kilkenny	2–19 – 1–15	Limerick
E Brennan (1–5); H Shefflin (1–2); E Larkin (0–4); R Power (0–4); T Walsh (0–2); J Fitzpatrick (0–1); A Fogarty (0–1)	(Report)	A O'Shaughnessy (0–7); O Moran (1–3); D O'Grady (0–2); S O'Connor (0–1); M Fitzgerald (0–1); N Moran (0–1)

Croke Park, Dublin
Attendance: 82,127
Referee: Diarmuid Kirwan (Cork)

KILKENNY GAA:
1	P. J. Ryan
2	Michael Kavanagh
3	Noel Hickey	(substituted off) 23'
4	Jackie Tyrrell
5	Tommy Walsh
6	Brian Hogan
7	J. J. Delaney
8	Derek Lyng
9	James "Cha" Fitzpatrick
10	Willie O'Dwyer	(substituted off) 26'
11	Martin Comerford
12	Eoin Larkin
13	Eddie Brennan
14	Henry Shefflin (c)	(substituted off) 35'
15	Aidan Fogarty
Substitutes:
16	James McGarry
17	John Tennyson	(substituted in) 23'
18	James Ryall
19	Richie Mullally
20	Michael Fennelly	(substituted in) 35'
21	Richie Power	(substituted in) 26'
22	John Dalton
23	Michael Rice
24	Eoin Reid
25	Eoin McCormack
26	P. J. Delaney
27	Peter "Chap" Cleere
28	Canice Hickey
29	T. J. Reid
30	Richie O'Neill
Manager:
Brian Cody

LIMERICK GAA:
1	Brian Murray
2	Damien Reale (c)
3	Stephen Lucey
4	Séamus Hickey
5	Peter Lawlor	(substituted off) 68'
6	Brian Geary
7	Mark Foley
8	Dónal O'Grady
9	Mike O'Brien	(substituted off) 35'
10	Mike FitzGerald	(substituted off) 58'
11	Ollie Moran
12	Seán O'Connor	(substituted off) 58'
13	Andrew O'Shaughnessy
14	Brian Begley
15	Donie Ryan	(substituted off) 58'
Substitutes:
16	Dave Bulfin
17	Mark O'Riordan	(substituted in) 68'
18	James O'Brien	(substituted in) 58'
19	Maurice O'Brien
20	Kevin Tobin	(substituted in) 58'
21	Pat Tobin	(substituted in) 58'
22	Niall Moran	(substituted in) 35'
23	Paudie O'Dwyer
24	Hugh Flavin
25	Barry Foley
26	Eoin Foley
27	Wayne McNamara
28	Gavin O'Mahony
29	Kieran O'Rourke
30	Donncha Sheehan
Manager:
Richie Bennis

MATCH RULES

- 70 minutes.
- Replay if necessary.
- Maximum of 5 substitutions.
