= 2009 All-Ireland Senior Hurling Championship final =

2009 All-Ireland Hurling Final
- Event: 2009 All-Ireland Senior Hurling Championship
Kilkenny	Tipperary
2–22	0–23
- Date: 6 September 2009
- Venue: Croke Park, Dublin
- Man of the Match: P.J. Ryan
- Referee: Diarmuid Kirwan (Cork)
- Attendance: 82,106
- Weather: Light Rain; 16 °C (61 °F)

The 2009 All-Ireland Senior Hurling Championship Final was a hurling match played on 6 September 2009 in Croke Park, Dublin, between Kilkenny and Tipperary. It was the first time the two teams had met in the All-Ireland final since 1991. Kilkenny's win was their fourth in a row, an accomplishment last matched by Cork between 1941 and 1944.

Kilkenny's victory gave them a record seventh title of the decade and a record 18th consecutive Championship win. Following the match, Kilkenny manager Brian Cody announced details of the release of his autobiography, Cody. Kilkenny hurler Henry Shefflin was named as the sport's Opel GPA Player of the Month for August after the win; Shefflin contributed 1–14 of Kilkenny's score in the final. Shefflin was named on The Etihad 125 Dream Team before the final. He also claimed his ninth All Star Award.

Prior to the game, Kilkenny were hailed as already being "the greatest side ever to play the game" by Eamonn Sweeney in the Sunday Independent as the Cork side who had already achieved four consecutive titles over sixty years previously did so against the backdrop of a foot-and-mouth disease outbreak which led to fewer games being played. Rock singer Shane MacGowan attended the final to support his team Tipperary.

== Background ==
Kilkenny went into the 2009 hurling final as defending champions, having won it in three consecutive years from 2006 to 2008. They were aiming for their fourth consecutive All-Ireland Senior Hurling title, a feat only previously achieved in hurling by Cork from 1941 to 1944.

== Ticketing ==
On 1 September 2009, the GAA confirmed that the final was an 82,000 sell-out. GAA Ticketing Manager Ronan Murphy said "Sunday's All-Ireland final is a sell-out. In fact both Tipperary and Kilkenny had been back to us looking for more tickets. There is an ancient rivalry between Tipperary and Kilkenny and the fact that Kilkenny are going for the four in a row also adds to the interest ... Throughout the country the demand for tickets was very strong".

== Team news ==
Tipperary manager Liam Sheedy kept faith with the same team that beat Limerick in the Semi-final. Vice captain Conor O'Mahony was passed fit after suffering a 'dead leg' the previous week and lead the team from the centre-back position. Willie Ryan, who was named team captain at the start of the season, had to make do with a place on the substitutes bench. Goalkeeper Brendan Cummins, full-forward Eoin Kelly and right-corner forward Lar Corbett were the only survivors from the last Tipperary team to play in an All-Ireland final in 2001.

Kilkenny manager Brian Cody in naming his team, omitted 2008 All-Ireland-winning captain James "Cha" Fitzpatrick for the final in favour of Derek Lyng. In total Cody made two personnel changes to the side which beat Waterford in the Semi-final stage, Richie Hogan also started at right half-forward, with Henry Shefflin moving to centre-forward, Martin Comerford was the player to drop out of the team. Comerford later revealed he had received advance word of this, but not from management.

== Match summary ==
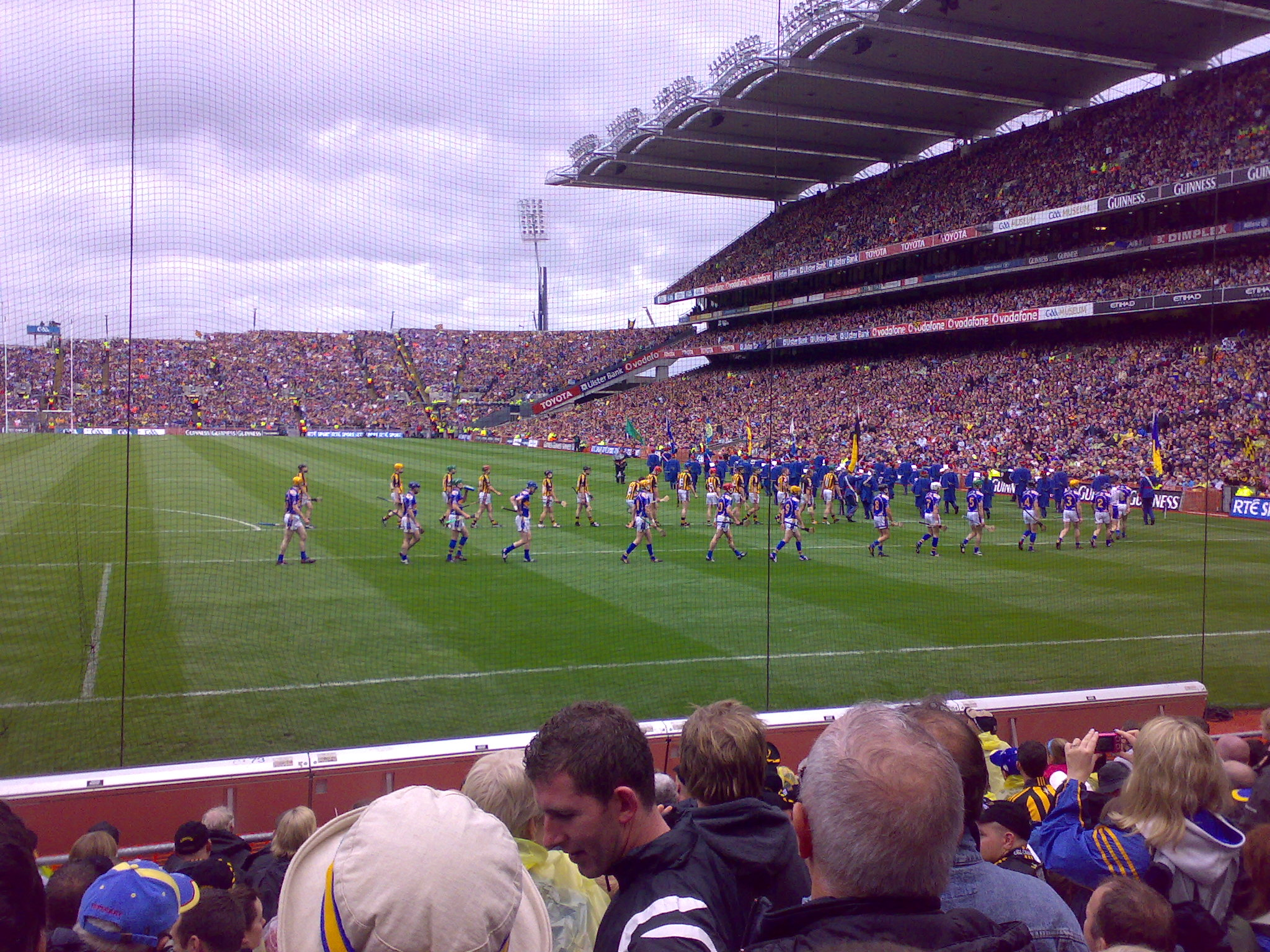
Both teams parade around Croke Park before the start of the game

=== First half ===
An early effort on goal by Kilkenny's Henry Shefflin was blocked by Tipperary goalkeeper Brendan Cummins. Tipperary then entered the lead following a point by Lar Corbett and two frees converted by Eoin Kelly. However, five points were then scored by Kilkenny in quick succession, with Eddie Brennan, Eoin Larkin and Tommy Walsh amongst the scorers. Tipperary's Kelly followed by Lar Corbett twice then scored. Kelly scored his eighth point of the match to give Tipperary the lead seven minutes before half-time. Five of six scores at the end of the first half came from Kilkenny though; amongst the scorers were Shefflin and Brennan. The sides were level in score on seven occasions throughout the first half but by the end it was Kilkenny who led by 0–13 to Tipperary's 0–11.

=== Second half ===
The first notable action of the second half occurred when Kilkenny goalkeeper PJ Ryan saved from a Séamus Callanan effort on goal. Callanan, however, soon scored two points to bring the scores level, with Shane McGrath scoring the point that put Tipperary ahead once again. Ryan soon saved another effort by Tipperary's Kelly and Kilkenny players Shefflin and Hogan scored some more points. Tipperary substitute Benny Dunne was sent off in the 53rd minute for hitting out at Walsh. However Tipperary continued to dominate as Kelly, Noel McGrath and Callanan each scored points to keep their team two points ahead. A controversial penalty awarded against Tipperary was scored by Shefflin and within one minute Martin Comerford on as a substitute consolidated Kilkenny's lead with a second goal. The last points of the match were scored by Eoin Larkin to seal Kilkenny's victory.

== Trophy presentation ==
Prior to the final, the GAA stated that the All-Ireland final post-match presentation of the Liam MacCarthy Cup would be returned to the centre of the pitch. The Association were considering a return to the centre of Croke Park for All-Ireland day presentations since the 2008 football decider between Tyrone and Kerry when Kerry's Colm Cooper was jostled by rival supporters as he left the field following the final whistle. From 1999 to 2001, presentations were made in the centre of Croke Park and passed off largely without incident. However, a pitch invasion by fans following the 2009 hurling final meant plans to change the style of trophy presentation were cancelled, with Kilkenny captain Michael Fennelly receiving the Liam MacCarthy Cup in the Hogan Stand of Croke Park. GAA President Christy Cooney later spoke of his disappointment about the pitch invasion but indicated that it confirmed his belief that the invasions must stop. He said:

Despite all pre-match communications, press publicity and big-screen appeals, it was extremely disappointing to see our plans were not realised. Even allowing for all the exuberance and joy of supporters on the day, it was disappointing to see the disregard for the safety of others amongst fans intent on getting on the pitch and ignoring safety appeals.

The Kilkenny County Board later complained about the presentation.

== Reaction ==
Kilkenny manager Brian Cody called the victory "very special", saying it felt "outstanding, terrific". However, he spoke of his annoyance at a question put to him by RTÉ's Marty Morrissey in his post-match interview which questioned the decision-making of the referee when he gave the penalty. While later appearing on Newstalk show Off the Ball, Cody reiterated his irritation with the RTÉ interview and also suggested there was a media "witch-hunt" against Kilkenny hurler Tommy Walsh—"The Tommy Walsh witch-hunt went on and Tommy Walsh rose above everything and proved the kind of player he is".

Tipperary manager Liam Sheedy said the team could not have done any more, "these lads have done everything I’ve asked of them in last eight months, everything I could possible want them to. So to just come up short is very, very disappointing. We knew we were facing the best team in probably the history of the game".

Barry O'Brien, the Tipperary County board chairman, said the county would raise the issue of introducing a video referee in future championships "to make sure the decisions are not only the right decisions, but are seen to be the right decisions". Former Offaly hurler Joachim Kelly, in the Irish Examiner, later agreed that video technology would be a good idea. Tipperary goalkeeper Brendan Cummins spoke in the aftermath of how he had appealed to the referee to look at the giant screen in Croke Park before awarding the penalty.

Diarmuid O'Flynn of the Irish Examiner said the match had been above the "mediocrity" which in his belief had been on show all season during the 125th anniversary of the GAA. Seán Moran of The Irish Times felt it was a "shame" the trophy presentation was spoilt by what he called "the reckless behaviour of some supporters". The Irish Independent, in rating the performances of the teams taking part in the 2009 Senior Hurling Championship, ranked Kilkenny as number one "undisputed champions" and "the greatest team of all time". The Kilkenny People's John Knox claimed Kilkenny had "surviv[ed] the most searching test any team has possibly ever received in Croke Park" and were now "the greatest hurling team ever!".

Henry Shefflin and other members of the winning team appeared on The Late Late Show on 11 September 2009.

== Civic reception ==
An estimated tens of thousands of fans gathered in Kilkenny city for the team's return the following night, taking photographs and receiving autographs when the team train eventually arrived at approximately 18:00. The Irish Times said "grown men cried and women swooned" as the team exited their train "blinking like astronauts from a space capsule, looking slightly shellshocked – and relieved – to be back". Henry Shefflin said it was "great to be home, back to our own people" and manager Brian Cody said returning to Kilkenny was "one of the highlights" of his experience. Kilkenny's mayor Malcolm Noonan and other politicians, formally dressed for the occasion, greeted the team as their open-top bus arrived at their civic reception held in the city centre. Following this, the team departed for their by now customary meal at Langton's Hotel.

== Audience ratings ==
The All-Ireland Senior Hurling Championship final was watched on RTÉ Two by 68% of those with televisions, its highest ratings for three years. Viewing figures peaked towards the end of the match. RTÉ.ie recorded 28,076 streams for the minor and senior hurling finals combined. A worldwide audience also watched the match.

== Awards ==
The nominations for the 2009 GAA All Stars Awards were announced on 23 September 2009. Henry Shefflin, who had eight previous wins, was nominated for a potential ninth win which would have equalled the record number of wins jointly held by Kilkenny hurler D. J. Carey and Kerry footballer Pat Spillane. Tommy Walsh was nominated for a seventh consecutive year. Tipperary's Eoin Kelly received his sixth nomination. Despite losing the final, Tipperary achieved one more nomination than Kilkenny, and all but two of the team which started the final were included. First-time nominees for the finalists were Pádraic Maher, Paddy Stapleton, James Woodlock, Pat Kerwick, John O'Brien and Noel McGrath of Tipperary and Michael Rice of Kilkenny.

Kilkenny won six All-Star Awards, with Shefflin and Walsh included. Tipperary won four.

== Match details ==
6 September 2009
15:30 UTC+1

Kilkenny	2–22 – 0–23	Tipperary
H. Shefflin 1–8; E. Larkin 0–3; E. Brennan 0–3; M. Comerford 1–0; R. Hogan 0–2; J. Tyrrell 0–1; T. Walsh 0–1; D. Lyng 0–1; R. Power 0–1; T.J. Reid 0–1; M. Fennelly 0–1	(Report)	E. Kelly 0–13; L. Corbett 0–4; S. Callanan 0–3; N. McGrath 0–2; S. McGrath 0–1

Croke Park, Dublin
Attendance: 82,106
Referee: Diarmuid Kirwan

Kilkenny	Tipperary

KILKENNY:
1	P. J. Ryan
2	Michael Kavanagh
3	J. J. Delaney
4	Jackie Tyrrell
5	Tommy Walsh
6	Brian Hogan
7	John Tennyson
8	Derek Lyng	(substituted off) 51'
9	Michael Rice
10	Richie Hogan. (substituted off) 55'
11	Henry Shefflin
12	Eoin Larkin
13	Eddie Brennan
14	Richie Power
15	Aidan Fogarty	(substituted off) 49'
Substitutes:
16	David Herity
17	Noel Hickey
18	James Ryall
19	John Dalton
20	James Fitzpatrick
21	Michael Fennelly	(substituted in) 51'
22	Martin Comerford	(substituted in) 55'
23	Sean Cummins
24	Canice Hickey
25	P. J. Delaney
26	Damien Fogarty
27	T. J. Reid	(substituted in) 49'
28	Willie O'Dwyer
29	Eoin Reid
30	Michael Grace
Manager:
Brian Cody

TIPPERARY:
1	Brendan Cummins
2	Paddy Stapleton
3	Pádraic Maher
4	Paul Curran
5	Declan Fanning
6	Conor O'Mahoney
7	Brendan Maher
8	James Woodlock		(substituted off) 68'
9	Shane McGrath
10	Pat Kerwick		(substituted off) 65'
11	Séamus Callanan
12	John O'Brien		(substituted off) 46'
13	Noel McGrath
14	Eoin Kelly
15	Lar Corbett
Substitutes:
16	Darren Gleeson
17	Éamonn Buckley
18	John Devane
19	Benny Dunne	(red card) 54'	(substituted in) 46'
20	Diarmaid Fitzgerald
21	Séamus Hennessy
22	Paul Kelly
23	Patrick Maher
24	Shane Maher
25	Hugh Maloney
26	Conor O'Brien
27	Gearóid Ryan
28	Willie Ryan (c)		(substituted in) 65'
29	Thomas Stapleton
30	Micheál Webster		(substituted in) 68'
Manager:
Liam Sheedy

Man of the Match:
P.J. Ryan

Linesmen:
Michael Wadding (Port Láirge)
James Owens (Loch Garman)

Sideline Official
Alan Kelly (Gaillimh)

Umpires
Denis O'Brien
Brendan O'Leary
Nole Twomey
Liam O'Leary
