= 2022 Munster Senior Camogie Championship =

Gaelic games season

All-Ireland Senior Camogie Championship 2022
Championship details
- Dates: 23 April – 14 May 2022
- Teams: 5

All-Ireland champions
- Winners: Cork ( win)
- Captain: Amy Lee
- Manager: Matthew Twomey

All-Ireland runners-up
- Runners-up: Clare
- Manager: Conor Dolan

Championship statistics
- Matches played: 5

The 2022 Munster Senior Camogie Championship was run as a standalone competition in May 2022. It was not part of the 2022 All-Ireland Senior Camogie Championship. Cork were the defending champions. Cork beat Clare in the final. Cork's intermediate team beat Kerry in the Intermediate final. Clare beat Waterford in the Munster junior final.

== Teams ==
5 teams took part in a knock-out competition.

- Clare
- Cork
- Limerick
- Tipperary
- Waterford

== Knockout stage ==
=== Quarter-final ===
23 April 2022; Quarter-final	Limerick	0-08 (8) (20) 1-17	Tipperary	Gaelic Grounds; Referee: Aaron Hogg (Clare)
23 April 2022; Quarter-final		Report		Gaelic Grounds; Referee: Aaron Hogg (Clare)

=== Semi-finals ===
24 April 2022; Semi-final	Cork	2-17 (23) (19) 3-10	Waterford	Páirc Uí Rinn; Referee: Mike Ryan (Tipperary)
24 April 2022; Semi-final		Report		Páirc Uí Rinn; Referee: Mike Ryan (Tipperary)

1 May 2022; Semi-final	Tipperary	1-16 (19) (19) 2-13	Clare	Semple Stadium; Referee: Diarmuid Kirwan (Cork)
1 May 2022; Semi-final		Report		Semple Stadium; Referee: Diarmuid Kirwan (Cork)

8 May 2022; Semi-final Replay	Clare	1-11 (14) (10) 0-10	Tipperary	Gaelic Grounds; Referee: Diarmuid Kirwan (Cork)
8 May 2022; Semi-final Replay		Report		Gaelic Grounds; Referee: Diarmuid Kirwan (Cork)

=== Final ===
14 May 2022; 18:00; Final	Cork	0-24 (24) (21) 1-18 (aet)	Clare	Páirc Uí Rinn; Referee: Mike Ryan (Tipperary)
14 May 2022; 18:00; Final		Report		Páirc Uí Rinn; Referee: Mike Ryan (Tipperary)
