= Mike Fitzgerald =

Mike Fitzgerald or Mike FitzGerald may refer to:

- Mike Fitzgerald (sociologist) (born 1951), academic and consultant
- Mike Fitzgerald (American football) (born 1941), former American football player
- Mike Fitzgerald (catcher) (born 1960), catcher in Major League Baseball
- Mike Fitzgerald (first baseman) (born 1964), first baseman in Major League Baseball
- Mike Fitzgerald (game designer), designer of collectible card games
- Mike FitzGerald (hurler) (born 1985), Irish hurler
- Mike Fitzgerald (outfielder) (1891–1945), outfielder in Major League Baseball

== See also ==
- Michael Fitzgerald (disambiguation)
