= GAA 125 =

Anniversary of the Gaelic Athletic Association in Ireland

Logo of GAA 125

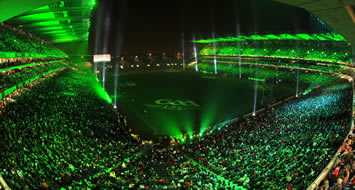
Light display in Croke Park to mark the Gaelic Athletic Association's 125th anniversary, after the opening game of the 2009 National Football League

GAA 125 refers to several events which took place during the 125th year of the Gaelic Athletic Association (GAA) in 2009. The organisation was founded at Hayes' Hotel in Thurles, County Tipperary on 1 November 1884.

The Irish Film Institute showed a film series to commemorate the occasion. A special exhibition was also held.

The Late Late Show hosted a special episode dedicated to the 125th anniversary of the foundation of the GAA. The episode, presented by Pat Kenny, was aired on RTÉ One on 9 January 2009 and was planned well in advance as soon as the 2008 Toy Show had ended. The Athlone Advertiser said the show was "a shocker. A genuine shocker. So much of the show lacked élan and panache that it became very difficult to stop switching the bloody thing off".

The Evening Herald put together a list of "125 New Year Resolutions" for the GAA in January 2009.

Events were launched at Croke Park, Dublin, with the opening match of the National Football League 2009 between Dublin and Tyrone on 31 January 2009. It was also only the second football match to take place under floodlights, following its predecessor in February 2008. The event included a fireworks display as well as commentary from Mícheál Ó Muircheartaigh, with the festivities being hosted by Hector Ó hEochagáin. A soundtrack of Irish music featuring bands such as The Cranberries and Snow Patrol was put together by Larry Mullen Jr. for the fireworks display, whilst Mundy and Sharon Shannon performed during half-time. The match ended with a victory for Tyrone by a score of 1–18 to 1–16.

President of Ireland Mary McAleese gave the Ó Fiaich Lecture in March 2009, speaking about the significance of the organisation's history. On 17 March 2009 (Saint Patrick's Day), the GAA was a central feature of the Dublin parade.

A conference occurred in Croke Park one day in April. 24 April 2009 was designated GAA 125 Schools Day and those of school-going age were encouraged to wear costumes related to the GAA.

In May, two matches were held in Grangemockler, County Tipperary, to remember Michael Hogan who was shot dead by authorities while on the field of play. At least 400,000 people from around the world took part in events held for Lá na gClub on 10 May 2009.

Avondale's Parnell Summer School examined the connections between sport and society in August. A conference titled "The birth of Croke Park in the Ballyhoura mountains" took place that month in honour of Frank Dineen, a unique man in that he was a former president and secretary of the Gaelic Athletic Association.

RTÉ Radio 1 broadcast original commentary from its archive footage of All-Ireland Football Finals and All-Ireland Hurling Finals on Sunday mornings between June and September. Guinness, a major sponsor of hurling and itself celebrating its own 250th anniversary in 2009, donated €250 per goal scored during the 2009 All-Ireland Senior Hurling Championship, which led to nearly €25,000.

The GAA 125 Quiz Final took place in Croke Park's Museum on 18 September 2009. Jimmy Magee was quizmaster on the night. The winner received a prize of a trophy, dinner, overnight stay in a hotel and tickets to the 2009 All-Ireland Senior Football Championship Final on the night of which they were also to appear on The Sunday Game television highlights package on RTÉ One. A qualifying round previously took place at the same venue three weeks earlier on 28 August 2009. Irish language television channel TG4 also conducted a similar quiz on its website in association with Jimmy Magee.

A special book dedicated to the 125th year of the GAA will be released in November. It is titled The GAA—A People’s History. The book includes journal entries and photographs from the 125-year period of the GAA's existence.

On the anniversary on 1 November there was a Mass at Thurles Cathedral, a ceremony at Thurles's Dr Croke monument, celebrations at the GAA Museum in Croke Park and a day of GAA television programming on TG4.

== See also ==
- 2009 All-Ireland Senior Football Championship Final
- 2009 All-Ireland Senior Hurling Championship Final
