= Michael Fitzgerald =

Michael Fitzgerald may refer to:

== Arts ==
- Michael A. Fitzgerald (1970–2023), American author and entrepreneur
- Michael C. FitzGerald (born 1953), American art historian and Picasso scholar
- Michael G. Fitzgerald (1950–2006), American film historian and author
- Michael O. Fitzgerald (born 1949), American author

== Religion ==
- Michael Joseph Fitzgerald (born 1948), American Catholic bishop
- Michael Fitzgerald (cardinal) (born 1937), British Catholic cardinal

== Sports ==
- Michael Fitzgerald (footballer) (born 1988), association football player for New Zealand
- Mike FitzGerald (hurler), Irish hurler
- Michael Fitzgerald (rugby union, born 1955), Australian rugby union footballer
- Michael Fitzgerald (rugby union, born 1987), New Zealand rugby union footballer
- Mick Fitzgerald (born 1970), Irish jockey

== Other ==
- Michael Fitzgerald (Iowa politician) (born 1951), State Treasurer of Iowa
- Michael Fitzgerald (Irish republican) (1881–1920), Irish Republican Army member, died on hunger strike
- Michael Fitzgerald (psychiatrist), Irish psychiatrist and professor of child and adolescent psychiatry at Trinity College, Dublin
- Michael W. Fitzgerald (born 1959), judge for the United States District Court for the Central District of California

== See also ==
- Mike Fitzgerald (disambiguation)
