= Canice (name) =

Canice is an Irish male given name, which is an anglicisation of the Gaelic name Cainnech or Coinneach, meaning "handsome". Kenneth is a Scottish name of the same origin. The name may refer to:

- Cainnech of Aghaboe (515–600), Irish saint
- Canice Brennan (born 1972), Irish hurler
- Canice Hickey (born 1982), Irish hurler
