= Noel Hickey =

Kilkenny hurler

Personal information
- Native name: Nollaig Ó hÍcí (Irish)
- Born: 22 December 1980 (age 45) Dunnamaggin, County Kilkenny, Ireland
- Occupation: Farmer
- Height: 5 ft 11 in (180 cm)

Sport
- Sport: Hurling
- Position: Full-back
Clubs
- Years: Club
- Dunnamaggin; Kilmoganny
Club titles
	Football	Hurling
Kilkenny titles	1	1
Inter-county*
Years	County	Apps (scores)
2000–2013	Kilkenny	47 (0-00)
Inter-county titles
- Leinster titles: 9
- All-Irelands: 9
- NHL: 4
- All Stars: 3
- *Inter County team apps and scores correct as of 19:55, 1 October 2012.

Noel Leonard Hickey (born 22 December 1980) is an Irish hurler who played as a full-back at senior level for the Kilkenny county team.

Born in Danganmore near Dunnamaggin, County Kilkenny, Hickey first played competitive hurling whilst at school in Coláiste Éamann Rís. He arrived on the inter-county scene at the age of sixteen when he first linked up with the Kilkenny minor team, before later lining out with the under-21 side. He made his senior debut in the 2000 championship. Hickey went on to play a key part for Kilkenny in what has come to be known as the greatest team of all time, and has won nine All-Ireland medals – eight of which were won on the field of play – nine Leinster medals and four National League medals. His brother, Tom Hickey, was a two-time All-Ireland runner-up with Kilkenny.

Hickey represented the Leinster inter-provincial team on a number of occasions in the early part of his career, winning back-to-back Inter-provincial medals in 2002 and 2003. At club level he won one championship medal with Dunnamaggin.

Cited by many of his hurling peers as one of the best full-backs of his generation, Hickey won three All-Star awards while he also won the All-Star Young Hurler of the Year award in his debut season.

Hickey has made 47 championship appearances for Kilkenny, more than any other full-back in the county's history. He announced his retirement from inter-county hurling on 12 January 2013.

== Early years ==
Hickey was born at St. Luke's Hospital in Kilkenny, to parents Andrew and Anne Hickey. The second youngest in a family of six brothers and two sisters, his father died when he was just a toddler. Hickey was educated locally at St. Leonard's National School in Dunnamaggin before later attending Coláiste Éamann Rís in nearby Callan. He later trained at Kildalton College, a third level agricultural institute.

== Playing career ==
=== Club ===
Hickey plays his club hurling with his local Dunnamaggin club and has enjoyed much success. He first came to prominence as a member of the club's minor side, winning a county title in this grade in 1995. He added a second minor county title to his collection three years later in 1998.

By this stage Hickey was also a key member of the Dunnamaggin under-21 side. It was a hugely successful period for the south Kilkenny club, as Hickey won his first under-21 county title in 1996 when he was only fifteen years-old. Two more under-21 titles followed in 1998 and 1999.

Hickey was still only a member of the club's minor team when he joined the Dunnamaggin senior team. In 1997 the club reached the senior county championship final for the very first time in their history. Reigning champions Young Irelands provided the opposition. Hickey had been impressive in some challenge games leading up to the final and was handed his senior championship debut just hours before the start of the game. It was a family affair as the full-back line consisted of Hickey at left corner-back while his two brothers provided support to his right. Dunnamaggin won the game by 2–10 to 2–7, giving Hickey and his club a first county title at senior level.

Dunnamaggin failed to retain the title the following year, while also suffering the ignominy of being relegated from the senior competition.

The club bounced back to reclaim their senior status in 2000, following victory in the intermediate county championship final.

In 2002 Hickey lined out in his second county championship decider at senior level. Once again it was Young Irelands who provided the opposition. Hickey faced a tough afternoon at full-back as D. J. Carey, his opposite number, scored a remarkable 2–7 to give Young Irelands a 3–14 to 1–15 victory.

=== Minor and under-21 ===
Hickey first came to prominence on the inter-county scene as a member of the Kilkenny minor team in 1997. He won a Leinster title that year following a fifteen-point trouncing of Offaly. Kilkenny's minor were later beaten in the All-Ireland semi-final.

Hickey was eligible for the minor grade again in 1998. He added a second Leinster title to his collection that year following a comprehensive defeat of Wexford in a replay. Kilkenny later made it all the way to the final where Cork provided the opposition. A 2–15 to 1–9 score line resulted in defeat for Kilkenny.

In 1999 Hickey joined the Kilkenny under-21 team and was appointed captain for the year. It was a successful year for 'the Cats', as they captured the Leinster title following a 1–17 to 1–6 defeat of Offaly. The subsequent All-Ireland final pitted Hickey's side against Galway and a close game developed. At the final whistle Kilkenny were the champions by 1–13 to 0–14 and Hickey collected his sole All-Ireland under-21 winners' medal.

=== Senior ===
==== 2000–2004 ====
Hickey made his senior championship debut at left corner-back on 18 June 2000 in a 3–16 to 0–10 trouncing of Dublin. He was moved to full-back for the subsequent provincial decider, and collected his first Leinster medal following a 2–21 to 1–13 defeat of Offaly. As a result of the "back-door" system both sides later faced off against each other again in the All-Ireland final. D. J. Carey capitalised on an Offaly mistake after just six minutes to start a goal-fest for "the Cats". Carey scored 2–4 in all, sharing his second goal with Henry Shefflin who also scored a goal in the second-half. At the full-time whistle Kilkenny were the champions by 5–15 to 1–14 and Hickey collected his first All-Ireland medal. He was subsequently honoured with his first All-Star award while also picking up the Eircell Young Hurler of the Year title.

In 2001 Hickey won a second Leinster medal following a 2–19 to 0–12 demolition of Wexford. Kilkenny subsequently faced a shock defeat by Galway in the All-Ireland semi-final.

Kilkenny recovered from this championship defeat by reaching the league decider in 2002. An injury-time point by Brian Dowling secured a 2–15 to 2–14 victory and a first National League medal for Hickey. He later added a third Leinster medal to his collection following a narrow 0–19 to 0–17 defeat of Wexford, before lining out in a second All-Ireland decider. First-round losers Clare worked their way through the qualifier system and provided the opposition, however, there was no doubt in the pundits' minds that there would be anything but a Kilkenny victory. Henry Shefflin and D. J. Carey combined to score 2–13, while Clare's forwards missed two easy goal chances. At the full-time whistle Kilkenny were the champions by 2–20 to 0–19 and Hickey collected a second All-Ireland medal.

The success continued for Kilkenny in 2003, with Hickey lining out in a second successive league decider. A remarkable 5–14 to 5–13 defeat of Tipperary, the highest aggregate score ever recorded in a league final, gave him a second winners' medal in that competition. A subsequent 2–23 to 2–12 defeat of Wexford gave Hickey a fourth successive Leinster medal, before Kilkenny qualified for another All-Ireland showdown. Age-old rivals Cork were the opponents, however, Hickey's side were once again the overwhelming favourites going into the game. Kilkenny were ahead at the break, however, Setanta Ó hAilpín scored the equalising goal for Cork after the restart. A Martin Comerford goal five minutes before the end clinched a 1–14 to 1–11 victory for Kilkenny. Not only did Hickey collect a third All-Ireland medal but he was also named as the man of the match. He subsequently collected a second All-Star award.

In 2004 Kilkenny surrendered their league and provincial crowns. In spite of these setbacks, Kilkenny still reached the All-Ireland final and the chance to capture an historic third championship in-a-row. Cork provided the opposition on a gloomy and overcast day, however, the game failed to live up to expectations. The sides were level for much of the game, and in the final twenty minutes Cork scored nine points without reply and secured the 0–17 to 0–9 victory.

==== 2005–2008 ====
Kilkenny were back in form in 2005, however, Hickey endured a season dogged by illness and injury. After missing Kilkenny's league triumph, he returned to championship action in time to collect a fifth Leinster medal following a 0–22 to 1–16 defeat of Wexford. Hickey had been feeling unwell for a while during the championship campaign, however, he failed to act until receiving advice from his sister who was a nurse. He was subsequently diagnosed with a virus that had attached itself to the muscle around the wall of the heart. It would have proved potentially fatal if it had gone undiagnosed. As a result, Hickey missed Kilkenny's All-Ireland semi-final against Galway, a game which saw "the Cats" concede five goals and exit the championship.

After being sidelined for a lengthy period, during which he also had laser-eye surgery, Hickey fought his way back to full fitness by the end of Kilkenny's league campaign in 2006. A forgettable 3–11 to 0–15 defeat of Limerick gave him a third National League medal. Hickey's championship return was delayed until 3 July 2006, almost a year to the day since he last played championship hurling. A 1–23 to 2–12 defeat of Wexford gave him a sixth Leinster medal. After playing at corner-back for some games throughout the campaign, Hickey was at his usual full-back position for the subsequent All-Ireland showdown with Cork. The Leesiders were aiming for a third All-Ireland victory in-a-row; however, revenge was foremost in the minds of Kilkenny as it was Cork who denied their three-in-a-row bid in 2004. On the day Kilkenny were far too strong for Cork as "the Cats" secured a 1–16 to 1–13 victory. Hickey was singled out for particular praise as he collected a fourth All-Ireland medal.

Hickey captured a seventh Leinster medal in 2007 following another facile 2–24 to 1–12 defeat of Wexford. A damaged hamstring restricted his involvement in the latter stages of the championship, however, Kilkenny still qualified for the All-Ireland final where, surprisingly, Limerick provided the opposition. Kilkenny got off to a flying start with Eddie Brennan and Henry Shefflin combining to score two goals within the first ten minutes. Hickey's hamstring caused problems during the match and he was forced to leave the field after just over twenty minutes. In spite of losing their full-back as well as their captain Henry Shefflin, Kilkenny still went on to win the game by 2–19 to 1–15. It was a fifth All-Ireland medal for Hickey.

Hickey's 2008 league and championship campaigns were hampered by injuries once again. He played no part in the provincial series but was back in his usual position for the All-Ireland semi-final defeat of Cork. The subsequent All-Ireland final saw Waterford providing the opposition. An absolute rout took place with Kilkenny winning by 3–30 to 1–13. It was a sixth All-Ireland medal for Hickey, while he later collected a third All-Star award.

==== 2009–2013 ====
A knee injury ruled Hickey out of the 2009 championship while he subsequently damaged an AC joint in his shoulder. Because of this he missed Kilkenny's historic fourth All-Ireland title in succession.

Hickey returned to championship hurling after a twenty-one month absence on 20 June 2010. He later added an eighth Leinster medal to his collection following a 1–19 to 1–12 defeat of new provincial rivals Galway. The subsequent All-Ireland final produced another showdown with Tipperary. The Munster men got off to a great start as Kilkenny's star forward Henry Shefflin had to leave the field with an injury. A hat-trick of goals by Lar Corbett and a fourth by Noel McGrath denied Kilkenny's drive-for-five and secured a remarkable 4–17 to 1–18 victory for Tipp. It was Kilkenny's first defeat in the championship since 2005.

Kilkenny retained their provincial title in 2011. The 4–17 to 1–15 defeat of Dublin ensured a ninth Leinster medal for Hickey. For the third year in succession, Kilkenny faced Tipperary in the subsequent All-Ireland decider. While Hickey's side were regarded as the underdogs, Tipp seemed uneasy with the favourites' tag. A 2–17 to 1–16 victory gave Hickey his seventh All-Ireland medal on the field of play.

Hickey played a more peripheral role during the 2012 championship. Kilkenny faced a shock defeat by Galway in the provincial final that year, however, they still reached the All-Ireland final via the "back door" system. Both sides met again in that game, however, Hickey played no part in the first drawn All-Ireland decider since 1959. In the subsequent replay he was introduced as a substitute after fifty-five minutes. Kilkenny won the game comfortably by 3–22 to 3–11 and Hickey collected his eighth All-Ireland medal on the field of play and his ninth medal overall.

On 12 January 2013, Hickey announced his retirement from inter-county hurling.

In December 2013, Hickey was honoured at a Dunnamaggin parish dinner following his retirement from inter-county hurling.

=== Inter-provincial ===
Hickey also lined out for Leinster in the inter-provincial series of games.

In 2002 he was at full-back as Munster faced their age-old rivals Munster in the championship decider. A last-minute free by Henry Shefflin secured a 4–15 to 3–17 victory and a first Inter-provincial medal for Hickey.

Hickey was the first-choice number three again in 2003 as Leinster faced Connacht in the final. A 4–9 to 2–12 victory gave him a second Inter-provincial medal.

== Honours ==
=== Team ===
Dunnamaggin

- Kilkenny Senior Hurling Championship (1): 1997
- Kilkenny Intermediate Hurling Championship (1): 2000
- Kilkenny Junior Hurling Championship (1): 2018 (sub)
- Leinster Junior Club Hurling Championship (1): 2018
- All-Ireland Junior Club Hurling Championship (1): 2019
- Kilkenny Under-21 Hurling Championship (3): 1996, 1998, 1999
- Kilkenny Minor Hurling Championship (2): 1995, 1998

Kilmoganny

- Kilkenny Senior Football Championship (1): 2000

Kilkenny

- All-Ireland Senior Hurling Championship (9): 2000, 2002, 2003, 2006, 2007, 2008, 2009 (sub), 2011, 2012
- Leinster Senior Hurling Championship (11): 2000, 2001, 2002, 2003, 2005, 2006, 2007, 2008 (sub), 2009 (sub), 2010, 2011
- National Hurling League (4): 2002, 2003, 2005, 2006
- All-Ireland Under-21 Hurling Championship (1): 1999 (c)
- Leinster Under-21 Hurling Championship (1): 1999 (c)
- Leinster Minor Hurling Championship (2): 1997, 1998

Leinster

- Inter-provincial Championship (1): 2002, 2003

=== Individual ===
Awards

- All Stars Young Hurler of the Year (1): 2000
- All-Star Awards (3): 2000, 2003, 2008
- Leinster Hurling Team of the last 25 years (1984–2009): Full-back

Achievements
Preceded by Dan Murphy (Cork)	All-Ireland Under-21 HC winning captain 1999	Succeeded by Donncha Sheehan (Limerick)
Awards
Preceded by Diarmuid O'Sullivan (Cork)	Eircell Young Hurler of the Year; 2000	Succeeded by Eoin Kelly (Tipperary)
Preceded by Henry Shefflin (Kilkenny)	All-Ireland SHC Final; Man of the Match; 2003	Succeeded by Niall McCarthy (Cork)
