= Donie Ryan =

Irish hurler (born 1976)

Personal information
- Native name: Dónal Ó Riain (Irish)
- Born: 26 December 1976 (age 49) Knocklong, County Limerick, Ireland
- Occupation: Farmer
- Height: 5 ft 10 in (178 cm)

Sport
- Sport: Hurling
- Position: Left corner-forward
Club
- Years: Club
- 1993-2018: Garryspillane
Club titles
- Limerick titles: 1
Inter-county
Years	County	Apps (scores)
2000-2011	Limerick	25 (7-09)
Inter-county titles
- Munster titles: 0
- All-Irelands: 0
- NHL: 0
- All Stars: 0

Donie Ryan (born 26 December 1976) is an Irish former hurler. At club level he played with Garryspillane and was also a member of the Limerick senior hurling team. He usually lined out as a forward.

== Career ==
Ryan first played hurling at juvenile and underage levels with the Garryspillane club and had a career that spanned 25 years with the club's top adult team. During that time, he won three County Championship titles in three different grades, including a County Senior Championship title in 2005. Ryan first came to prominence on the inter-county scene at the underage and intermediate levels with Limerick. He joined his brother, T. J. Ryan, on the Limerick senior hurling team for the Oireachtas Cup in 1997, however, it was 2002 before he established himself on the team. Ryan was at left corner-forward when Limerick lost the 2007 All-Ireland final to Kilkenny. His inter-county career ended when he was dropped from the panel in 2011.

== Career statistics ==
Team	Year	National League			Munster		All-Ireland		Total	
Team	Year	Division	Apps	Score	Apps	Score	Apps	Score	Apps	Score
Limerick	2002	Division 1B	2	0-02	1	0-00	1	0-00	4	0-02
Limerick	2003	Division 1B	0	0-00	0	0-00	0	0-00	0	0-00
Limerick	2004	Division 1B	7	2-06	0	0-00	1	0-00	8	2-06
Limerick	2005	Division 1B	8	3-07	2	0-01	4	3-02	14	6-10
Limerick	2006	Division 1B	6	1-08	1	0-00	4	1-01	11	2-09
Limerick	2007	Division 1B	5	0-02	2	0-00	3	3-02	10	3-04
Limerick	2008	Division 1B	4	2-05	1	0-01	1	0-01	6	2-07
Limerick	2009	Division 1	5	1-03	2	0-00	1	0-01	8	1-04
Limerick	2010	Division 1	0	0-00	0	0-00	0	0-00	0	0-00
Limerick	2011	Division 2	2	0-02	0	0-00	1	0-00	3	0-02
Career total			39	9-35	9	0-02	16	7-07	64	16-44

== Honours ==
Garryspillane

- Limerick Senior Hurling Championship: 2005
- Limerick Premier Intermediate Hurling Championship: 2018
- Limerick Intermediate Hurling Championship: 1996
- Limerick Under-21 Hurling Championship: 1995
