= Pat Kerwick =

Irish hurler

Personal information
- Native name: Pádraig Ó Ciarmhaic (Irish)
- Born: 18 May 1982 (age 44) Killenaule, County Tipperary, Ireland
- Occupation: Bricklayer
- Height: 5 ft 11 in (180 cm)

Sport
- Sport: Hurling
- Position: Right wing-forward
Club
- Years: Club
- Killenaule
Club titles
- Tipperary titles: 0
Inter-county*
Years	County	Apps (scores)
2008-2012	Tipperary	8 (1-9)
Inter-county titles
- Munster titles: 2
- All-Irelands: 1
- All Stars: 0
- *Inter County team apps and scores correct as of 01:30, 1 November 2012.

Pat Kerwick (born 18 May 1982) is an Irish hurler who played as a right wing-back for the Tipperary senior team.

Kerwick made his first appearance for the team during the 2006 Waterford Crystal Cup and was a regular member of the starting fifteen until he was dropped from the team prior to the 2012 National League. During that time he has won two Munster winners' medals. He ended up as an All-Ireland runner-up on one occasion.

At club level Kerwick plays with Killenaule.

== Playing career ==
=== Club ===
Kerwick plays his club hurling with Killenaule

=== Inter-county ===
Kerwick made his senior competitive debut for Tipperary in the 2006 Waterford Crystal Cup against Limerick, however, he remained on the periphery of the team for a number of seasons.

In 2008 Kerwick made his National Hurling League debut against Offaly in 2008, lining out at right half-forward and scoring 1-1 from play. Later that season he made his championship debut as Tipperary later reached the Munster final where they defeated a resurgent Clare team by 2–21 to 0–19. It was Kerwick's first Munster winners' medal. Tipperary were subsequently defeated in a tense All-Ireland semi-final by Waterford on a scoreline of 1–20 to 1–18.

Kerwick won his second Munster medal in 2009 as Tipp defeated Waterford by 4–14 to 2–16. After a six-week lay-off and a facile semi-final win over Limerick, Tipp qualified for an All-Ireland final meeting with Kilkenny. For much of the match it looked as if Tipp would pull off a shock and deny 'the Cats' a record-equaling four-in-a-row. Two quick goals in the space of a minute, one from a penalty by Henry Shefflin, sealed a 2–22 to 0–23 victory and defeat for Tipperary. In spite of this defeat Kerwick was subsequently nominated for an All-Star award.

During the 2010 championship campaign Kerwick played no part in Tipperary's campaign. In spite of this he won an All-Ireland medal that year following Tipp's 4–17 to 1–18 defeat of Kilkenny. Kerwick sang "The Galtee Mountain Boy" following the presentation of the Liam MacCarthy Cup to Tipperary, reminiscent of the singing of The West's Awake after Galway's win in 1980.

Kerwick fell out of favour with new Tiperary manager Declan Ryan, and played no part in the 2011 championship. He was eventually dropped from the panel in 2012.

== Honours ==
=== Team ===
Tipperary

- Munster Senior Hurling Championship (3): 2008, 2009
- All-Ireland Senior Hurling Championship (1): 2010

Monkey
