= Dave Bulfin =

Irish hurler

Personal information
- Native name: Daithí Bulfin (Irish)
- Born: 1980 (age 45–46) Mungret, County Limerick, Ireland
- Occupation: Primary school teacher

Sport
- Sport: Hurling
- Position: Goalkeeper
Club
- Years: Club
- Mungret/St. Paul's
Club titles
- Limerick titles: 0
Inter-county*
Years	County	Apps (scores)
2003/04, 2007/09	Limerick	0 (0-00)
Inter-county titles
- Munster titles: 0
- All-Irelands: 0
- NHL: 3
- All Stars: 0
- *Inter County team apps and scores correct as of 15:01, 4 November 2012.

Dave Bulfin (born 1980) is an Irish hurler who played as a goalkeeper for the Limerick senior team.

Bulfin joined the team during the 2003 National League and was second choice goalkeeper until he left the panel after the 2009 championship. He enjoyed little success in the senior grade and was an unused substitute in Limerick's All-Ireland final defeat in 2007. Bulfin started two games during the 2008 National Hirling League and impressed during defeats away to Tipperary and home to Galway. He received praise for both performances from both local and national media. He made spectacular saves on both games and Limerick would have been defeated by a lot more only for him

At club level Bulfin plays with Mungret/St. Paul's.

== Playing career ==
=== Club ===
Bulfin plays his club hurling with Mungret and has had a steady career helping his team in 16 championships and winning the Limerick County Junior title in 2006 when defeating Askeaton in the final. He retired from club hurling in 2013 citing a lack of motivation as his reason for packing it in.

=== Inter-county ===
Bulfin made his senior debut for Limerick in a National Hurling League game against Dublin in 2003. It was the only game he played during that campaign, however, he was subsequently included on Limerick's championship panel.

Bulfin was the sub goalkeeper for Limerick during their 2-19 to 1-15 defeat by Kilkenny in the 2007 All-Ireland final.
