= Eoin McCormack =

Irish hurler

Personal information
- Native name: Eoin Mac Cormaic (Irish)
- Born: 1982 (age 43–44) Kilkenny, Ireland

Sport
- Sport: Hurling
- Position: Centre-forward
Club
- Years: Club
- James Stephens
Club titles
- Galway titles: 3
- Leinster titles: 2
- All-Ireland Titles: 1
Inter-county
Years	County	Apps (scores)
2005-2007	Kilkenny	7 (3-4)
Inter-county titles
- Leinster titles: 1
- All-Irelands: 0
- NHL: 0
- All Stars: 0

Eoin McCormack (born 1982) is an Irish hurler who played as a right corner-forward for the Kilkenny senior team. At club level he played with James Stephens GAA club.

McCormack made his first appearance for the Kilkenny team during the 2005 National League and became a regular substitute on the team over the following two seasons. During that time, he won one Leinster winners' medal on the field of play, as well as two All-Ireland winners' medals as a non-playing substitute.

At club level, McCormack has won one All-Ireland Senior Club Hurling Championship medal (in 2005), two Leinster Club Championship winners' medals and three Kilkenny Club Championship medals.
