= Martin Comerford =

Irish hurler (born 1978)

Personal information
- Native name: Máirtín Mac Cumascaigh (Irish)
- Nickname: Gorta
- Born: 9 November 1978 (age 47) London, England
- Occupation: Sales representative
- Height: 6 ft 4 in (193 cm)

Sport
- Sport: Hurling
- Position: Centre-forward
Club
- Years: Club
- 1997-present: O'Loughlin Gaels
Club titles
- Kilkenny titles: 4
- Leinster titles: 2
- All-Ireland Titles: 0
Inter-county*
Years	County	Apps (scores)
2001–2011	Kilkenny	41 (6-64)
Inter-county titles
- Leinster titles: 8
- All-Irelands: 6
- NHL: 4
- All Stars: 3
- *Inter County team apps and scores correct as of 18:56, 17 January 2015.

Martin Timothy Comerford (born 9 November 1978) is an Irish hurler who played as a centre-forward for the Kilkenny senior team.

Born in London, at an early age Comerford went to St. John's Boys' National School in Ballybough Street, Kilkenny. Comerford went on to attend St. Kieran's College but was overlooked for the hurling team. He arrived on the inter-county scene at the age of twenty-one when he first linked up with the Kilkenny under-21 team. He joined the senior panel during the 2001 championship. Comerford later became a regular member of the starting fifteen, and won six All-Ireland medals, eight Leinster medals and four National League medals on the field of play. He was an All-Ireland runner-up on two occasions.again kane is a just a muppet .

At club level Comerford is a two-time Leinster medallist with O'Loughlin Gaels. In addition to this he has also won three championship medals, while he was an All-Ireland runner-up on one occasion.

Comerford's brother, Andy, was a three-time All-Ireland medallist and winning captain with Kilkenny.

Throughout his career Comerford made 41 championship appearances. He announced his retirement from inter-county hurling on 12 May 2011.

== Playing career ==
=== Club ===
In 2001 Comerford won his first championship medal following a 1–17 to 1–6 defeat of Graigue-Ballycallan. Not only was it Comerford's first club championship but it was O'Loughlin Gaels' first ever.

Two years later in 2003 Comerford won a second championship winners' medal following a defeat of Young Irelands after a draw and a replay. He later collected a first Leinster medal following a 0–15 to 0–9 defeat of double All-Ireland champions Birr.

After a hiatus of seven years and a defeat in the 2006 championship decider, O'Loughlin Gaels reached the top of the pile once again in 2010 following a 0–17 to 1–11 defeat of Carrickshock. It was Comerford's third championship medal. O'Loughlin Gaels later secured a second Leinster club title following a 0–14 to 1–8 defeat of Oulart-the-Ballagh. Hogan's side subsequently qualified for an All-Ireland final showdown with Clarinbridge on 17 March 2011. A dominant second-half display gave Clarinbridge a 2–18 to 0–12 victory.

=== Inter-county ===
==== Beginnings ====
Comerford never played minor hurling for Kilkenny, but was a late addition to the under-21 team for the All-Ireland series in 1999. He was an unused substitute for Kilkenny's narrow 1–13 to 0–14 defeat of Galway to take the All-Ireland title.

In 2001 Comerford was added to the Kilkenny senior panel. That year he was an unused substitute for Kilkenny's 2–19 to 0-12 provincial decider defeat of Wexford.

==== Early successes ====
Comerford became a regular member of the starting fifteen in 2002. He won his first National Hurling League medal that year, as a late Brian Dowling free secured a narrow 2–15 to 2–14 victory over Cork. Comerford made his senior championship debut on 9 June 2002 in a 2–10 to 1-14 provincial semi-final defeat of Offaly. He later collected his first Leinster medal on the field of play as Kilkenny recorded a narrow 0–19 to 0–17 defeat of fourteen-man Wexford. On 8 September 2002 Comerford lined out in his first All-Ireland decider as Kilkenny faced first-round losers Clare. Kilkenny forwards Henry Shefflin and D. J. Carey combined to score 2-13 between them, as Kilkenny secured a 2–20 to 0–19 victory. It was Comerford's first All-Ireland medal. He was later honoured with a first All-Star award.

In 2003 Comerford won a second league medal as Kilkenny came back from eight points down to secure a stunning 5–14 to 5-13 extra-time defeat of Tipperary. He later won a second successive Leinster medal, as Kilkenny defeated Wexford by 2–23 to 2–12. The subsequent All-Ireland final on 14 September 2003 saw Kilkenny face Cork for the first time in four years. Both teams remained level for much of the game, exchanging tit-for-tat scores. A Setanta Ó hAilpín goal gave Cork the advantage, however, a Comerford goal five minutes from the end settled the game as Kilkenny went on to win by 1–14 to 1–11. It was Comerford's second All-Ireland medal. He later collected his second All-Star award.

Comerford was appointed captain of the team in 2004. After facing a shock, last-minute 2–15 to 1–16 defeat by Wexford in the Leinster semi-final, Kilkenny worked their way through the qualifiers and lined out against Cork in the All-Ireland decider on 12 September 2004. The game was expected to be a classic, however, a rain-soaked day made conditions difficult as Kilkenny aimed to secure a third successive championship. The first half was a low-scoring affair and provided little excitement for fans, however, the second half saw Cork completely take over. For the last twenty-three minutes Cork scored nine unanswered points and went on to win the game by 0–17 to 0–9.

Kilkenny were back in form in 2005, with Comerford winning a third league medal following a 3–20 to 0–15 victory over Clare. "The Cats" later struggled against a wasteful Wexford side, however, a 0–22 to 1–16 victory gave Comerford a third Leinster medal. While a third successive All-Ireland showdown with Cork seemed likely, Galway defeated Kilkenny in the All-Ireland semi-final in one of the games of the decade.

==== Four-in-a-row ====
In 2006 Comerford added a fourth league medal to his collection following a 3–11 to 0–14 victory over Limerick. He later won his fourth Leinster medal following another facile 1–23 to 1–12 victory over Wexford. On 3 September 2006 Kilkenny faced a Cork team who were presented with the opportunity to become the first side in nearly thirty years to secure three successive All-Ireland championships. Like previous encounters neither side took a considerable lead, however, Kilkenny had a vital goal from Aidan Fogarty. Cork were in arrears coming into the final few minutes, however, Ben O'Connor scored a late goal for Cork. It was too little too late as the Cats denied Cork on a score line of 1–16 to 1–13. Comerford had collected his third All-Ireland medal. He rounded off the year by claiming a third successive All-Star award.

Comerford collected a fifth Leinster medal in 2007, as Kilkenny asserted their provincial dominance and defeated Wexford by 2–24 to 1–12. On 2 September 2007 Kilkenny faced defeated Munster finalists and surprise All-Ireland semi-final winners Limerick in the championship decider. Kilkenny got off to a flying start with Eddie Brennan and Henry Shefflin scoring two goals within the first ten minutes to set the tone. Limerick launched a second-half comeback, however, "the Cats" were too powerful and cruised to a 2–19 to 1–15 victory. It was Comerford's third All-Ireland medal.

Kilkenny secured the Leinster crown again in 2008, with Comerford collecting a sixth winners' medal following a 5–21 to 0-17 drubbing of Wexford. On 8 September 2008 Kilkenny faced Waterford in the All-Ireland decider for the first time in forty-five years. In a disappointingly one-sided final, Kilkenny produced a near perfect seventy minutes as Waterford endured a nightmare afternoon. A 23-point winning margin, 3-24 from play, only two wides in the entire match and eight scorers in all with Eddie Brennan and Henry Shefflin leading the way in a 3–30 to 1–13 victory. It was Comerford's fifth All-Ireland medal.

Comerford collected a seventh Leinster medal in 2009 as new challengers Dublin were bested by 2–18 to 0–18. On 6 September Kilkenny were poised to become the second team ever in the history of hurling to win four successive All-Ireland championships when they faced Tipperary in the decider. For long periods Tipp looked the likely winners, however, late goals from Henry Shefflin and substitute Comerford finally killed off their efforts to secure a 2–22 to 0–23 victory. Comerford had collected his sixth All-Ireland medal.

==== Decline ====
In 2010 Kilkenny defeated Galway in an eagerly-anticipated but ultimately disappointing provincial decider. A 1–19 to 1–12 victory gave Comerford an eighth Leinster medal. The drive for a fifth successive All-Ireland crown reached a head on 5 September 2010, when Kilkenny faced Tipperary in the All-Ireland decider. "The Cats" lost talisman Henry Shefflin due to injury, while Tipperary's Lar Corbett ran riot and scored a hat-trick of goals as Comerford's side fell to a 4–17 to 1–18 defeat.

== Honours ==
=== Team ===
O'Loughlin Gaels

- Leinster Senior Club Hurling Championship (2): 2003, 2010
- Kilkenny Senior Hurling Championship (4): 2001, 2003, 2010, 2016

Kilkenny

- All-Ireland Senior Hurling Championship (6): 2002, 2003, 2006, 2007, 2008, 2009
- Leinster Senior Hurling Championship (9): 2001 (sub), 2002, 2003, 2005, 2006, 2007, 2008, 2009, 2010
- National Hurling League (5): 2002, 2003, 2005, 2006, 2009 (sub)
- All-Ireland Under-21 Hurling Championship (1): 1999 (sub)

=== Individual ===
Awards

- All-Stars (3): 2002, 2003, 2006

Sporting positions
Preceded by D. J. Carey	Kilkenny Senior Hurling Captain; 2004	Succeeded by Peter Barry
