= Brian Murray (hurler) =

Irish hurler

Personal information
- Native name: Briain Ó Muirí (Irish)
- Born: 6 September 1984 (age 42) Patrickswell, County Limerick, Ireland
- Occupation: Courier
- Height: 5 ft 8 in (173 cm)

Sport
- Sport: Hurling
- Position: Goalkeeper
Club
- Years: Club
- 2004–present: Patrickswell
Club titles
- Limerick titles: 4
Inter-county
Years	County	Apps (scores)
2006–2009	Limerick	20 (2–0)
Inter-county titles
- Munster titles: 0
- All-Irelands: 0
- NHL: 0
- All Stars: 1

Brian Murray (born 6 September 1984 in Patrickswell, County Limerick) is an Irish sportsperson. He plays hurling with his local club Patrickswell and was a member of the Limerick senior inter-county team from 2006 until 2009.

== Playing career ==
=== Club ===
Murray plays his club hurling with the famous Patrickswell club just outside Limerick city. He was born into a family that had a strong association with hurling. His father, Terence Murray, was also a member of the Patrickswell club and refereed the 1987 and 1993 All-Ireland Senior Hurling Championship finals between Galway and Kilkenny. After enjoying little success as minor or under-21 levels he subsequently joined the club's senior team. After beginning as an outfield player Murray was later chosen as goalkeeper on the team and has remained in that position since 2005. He played in his first senior county final in 2006, however, victory went to Bruree on that occasion.

=== Inter-county ===
Murray first came to prominence on the inter-county scene as a member of the Limerick senior inter-county team in 2005. He lined out in a challenge game against Tipperary in late 2005, a game which Limerick won with Murray keeping a clean sheet as goalkeeper. He impressed in that game and made his competitive debut against the same opposition in a National Hurling League game in early 2006. Murray remained as the first-choice goalkeeper for all but one game of the National League. The team remained unbeaten and qualified for the final against Kilkenny. It was an unhappy day for Limerick as 'the Cats' won the day by 3–11 0–14. Murray's performances were so impressive that he edged out Timmy Houlihan as the regular Limerick goalkeeper for the championship. He made his debut in the Munster championship against Tipperary, however, Limerick's championship losing streak continued and they were defeated. After moving successfully through the qualifier system Murray's side later played defending champions Cork in the All-Ireland quarter-final. Although the team only lost by a point it was a game that Limerick could easily have won.

In 2007 Limerick faced near neighbours Tipperary in the semi-final of the Munster championship. That game ended in a draw with both sides scoring 1–19. The replay saw Limerick in arrears by ten points at half-time, however, Murray's side rallied to level the game at the end of normal time. A period of extra time failed to separate the sides and a score line of 1–24 to 2–21 resulted in a second replay. Once again, Limerick looked vulnerable at times during the game, however, they grinded out a victory with a score line of 0–22 to 2–13. It was Limerick's first win in the Munster championship since 2001. Murray later lined out against Waterford in the Munster final, however, they were defeated on a score line of 3–17 to 1–14. These two sides later met again in the All-Ireland semi-final, however, manager Richie Bennis had done his homework and masterminded a surprise 5–11 to 2–15 victory over the Munster champions. This victory allowed Murray's side to play Kilkenny in the championship decider. Unfortunately, Limerick got off to a bad start with Murray letting in two goals by Eddie Brennan and Henry Shefflin in the first ten minutes. Limerick fought back, however, 'the Cats', however, went on to win the game by six points. In spite of this loss Murray was later presented with his first All-Star award, marking him out as the best goalkeeper in the championship.

After the highs of the previous year, 2008 proved to be a difficult year for the Limerick hurlers. The team were trounced by 4–12 to 1–16 in opening game of the championship by Clare. The newly structured qualifier system pitted Murray's side against Offaly in a must-win game. Limerick, however, were out of sorts as Murray left in three goals leading to a 3–19 to 0–18 defeat. Limerick's involvement in the championship came to an end following this trouncing.

In 2009 Justin McCarthy took over as Limerick manager. After a poor showing in the National League, Limerick's first championship assignment was a Munster semi-final showdown with Waterford. That game, described by many pundits as the worst game in the history of the provincial championship, ended in a draw. The replay was a big improvement, however, Murray ended up on the losing side by 0–25 to 0–17. Limerick later manoeuvred through the qualifiers, narrowly defeating Wexford, Laois and Dublin. It was the first time that Limerick secured three championship victories in-a-row since 1996. In the game against 'the Dubs' Murray was brought all the way up the field to convert a penalty. A four-point victory allowed Limerick to advance to the All-Ireland semi-final against Tipperary.

=== Inter-provincial ===
Murray has also lined out with Munster in the Railway Cup inter-provincial competition. He captured a winners medal in this competition in 2007 as Munster defeated Connacht.

== Honours ==
=== Patrickswell ===
- Limerick Senior Hurling Championship:
  - Winner (4): 2000, 2003, 2016, 2019
  - Runner-up (2): 2006, 2015

=== Limerick ===
- All-Ireland Senior Hurling Championship:
  - Winner (0):
  - Runner-up (1): 2007
- Munster Senior Hurling Championship:
  - Winner (0):
  - Runner-up (1): 2007
- National Hurling League:
  - Winner (0):
  - Runner-up (1): 2006

=== Munster ===
- Railway Cup:
  - Winner (1): 2007
