= Kieran O'Rourke =

Irish hurler

Personal information
- Native name: Ciarán Ó Ruairc (Irish)
- Born: 1987 (age 38–39) Bruree, County Limerick, Ireland

Sport
- Sport: Hurling
- Position: Right corner-back
Club
- Years: Club
- Bruree
Club titles
- Limerick titles: 1
Inter-county*
Years	County	Apps (scores)
2007-2011	Limerick	2 (0-00)
Inter-county titles
- Munster titles: 0
- All-Irelands: 0
- NHL: 0
- All Stars: 0
- *Inter County team apps and scores correct as of 13:50, 4 November 2012.

Kieran O'Rourke (born 1987) is an Irish hurler who played as a right corner-back for the Limerick senior team.

O'Rourke joined the team during the 2007 National League and was a semi-regular member of the starting fifteen over subsequent seasons.

At club level O'Rourke is a one-time county club championship medalist with Bruree.

== Playing career ==
=== Club ===
O'Rourke plays his club hurling with Bruree and has enjoyed much success.

In 2006 he lined out in his first hurling championship decider. Patrickswell were the opponents, however, a narrow 1–16 to 1–15 victory gave O'Rourke a Limerick Senior Hurling Championship medal.

=== Inter-county ===
O'Rourke made his senior debut for Limerick in a National League game against Antrim in 2007. He played a number of games during that campaign and was subsequently included on Limerick's championship panel.

After a number of seasons O'Rourke was recalled to the panel in 2010. He made his championship debut that year in a Munster semi-final defeat by Cork.

== Honours ==
=== Team ===
Bruree

- Limerick Senior Club Hurling Championship (1): 2006
