= John Dalton (hurler) =

Irish hurler

Personal information
- Native name: Seán Dáltún (Irish)
- Born: 22 July 1985 (age 41) Carrickshock, County Kilkenny, Ireland
- Occupation: Professional Farmer
- Height: 6 ft 0 in (183 cm)

Sport
- Sport: Hurling
- Position: Right corner-back
Club
- Years: Club
- 2002-present: Carrickshock
Club titles
- Kilkenny titles: 0
Inter-county*
Years	County	Apps (scores)
2006-2011	Kilkenny	10 (0-00)
Inter-county titles
- Leinster titles: 4
- All-Irelands: 0
- NHL: 0
- All Stars: 0
- *Inter County team apps and scores correct as of 14:23, 12 September 2011.

John Dalton (born 22 July 1985) is an Irish hurler who played as a corner-back for the Kilkenny senior team.

Dalton joined the team during the 2006 championship. However, it took two years before he became a regular member of the starting fifteen. Since then he has won five All-Ireland winner's medals as a non playing substitute and four Leinster winner's medals on the field of play. He announced his retirement following the conclusion of the 2011 championship.

At club level Dalton plays for Carrickshock, however, he has yet to win a county club championship winners' medal.

== Playing career ==
=== Club ===
Dalton has enjoyed great success with the Carrickshock club in all grades of competition.

After winning under-16, minor and under-21 county championships, Dalton joined the club's top team in the early 2000s. After losing back-to-back county finals at intermediate level, Carrickshock triumphed in 2004 with a win over Mooncoin. The club subsequently represented Kilkenny in the provincial series of games and ended the year as Leinster champions. The great run of success for Dalton's club came to an end in the All-Ireland final, when Kildangan of Tipperary defeated Carrickshock by 2–13 to 1–13.

== Honours ==
=== Team ===
Carrickshock

- Leinster Intermediate Club Hurling Championship (1): 2004
- Kilkenny Intermediate Club Hurling Championship (1): 2004
- Kilkenny Under-21 'B' Club Hurling Championship (1): 2000
- Kilkenny Minor 'A' Club Hurling Championship (2): 2001, 2002
- Nenagh Co-op Under-16 Hurling Championship (1): 2001

Waterford Institute of Technology

- Fitzgibbon Cup (1): 2008

Kilkenny

- All-Ireland Senior Hurling Championship (5): 2006 (sub), 2007 (sub), 2008 (sub), 2009 (sub), 2011 (sub)
- Leinster Senior Hurling Championship (6): 2006 (sub), 2007, 2008, 2009, 2010, 2011 (sub)
- National Hurling League (2): 2006 (sub), 2009 (sub)
- Walsh Cup (3): 2006, 2007, 2009
- All-Ireland Under-21 Hurling Championship (1): 2006
- Leinster Under-21 Hurling Championship (2): 2005, 2006
- All-Ireland Minor Hurling Championship (2): 2002 (sub), 2003
- Leinster Minor Hurling Championship (2): 2002 (sub), 2003
