= Canice Hickey =

Irish hurler (born 1984)

Personal information
- Native name: Cainneach Ó hÍcí (Irish)
- Born: Dunamaggin, County Kilkenny, Ireland
- Occupation: Secondary school teacher
- Height: 6 ft 0 in (183 cm)

Sport
- Sport: Hurling
- Position: Full-back
Club
- Years: Club
- Dunnamaggin Kilmoganny
Club titles
| | Football | Hurling |
| Kilkenny titles | 1 | 1 |
College
- Years: College
- University College Cork
College titles
- Fitzgibbon titles: 0
Inter-county
| Years | County | Apps (scores) |
| 2004-2010 | Kilkenny | 4 (0-00) |
Inter-county titles
- Leinster titles: 4
- All-Irelands: 3
- NHL: 1
- All Stars: 0

Canice Hickey is an Irish former hurler. At club level he played with Dunnamaggin a member of the Kilkenny senior hurling team. He usually lined out as a full-back. Hickey's elder brothers Tom and Noel, also lined out at club and inter-county levels.

== Career ==
Hickey first came to prominence at juvenile and underage levels with the Dunnamaggin club before eventually joining the club's top adult team. He just graduated from the minor grade when he won a County Intermediate Championship title in 2000. Hickey first appeared in inter-county scene as part of the Kilkenny minor team that lost the 1998 All-Ireland final to Cork. After three years with minor side he progressed onto the under-21 team and won an All-Ireland Under-21 Championship title in his final game in the grade in 2003. Hickey was part of the Kilkenny senior hurling team during the pre-season Walsh Cup in 2004, was released from the panel shortly after but was recalled in 2007. He would go on to line out as a substitute in four successive All-Ireland finals, winning three successive titles against Limerick in 2007, Waterford in 2008 and Tipperary in 2009. Hickey's other honours as a substitute include a National League title and four successive Leinster Championship medals.

== Honours ==
Dunnamaggin

- Kilkenny Intermediate Hurling Championship: 2000
- Kilkenny Senior Hurling Championship: 1997
- Kilkenny Senior Football Championship: 2000

Kilkenny

- All-Ireland Senior Hurling Championship: 2007, 2008, 2009
- Leinster Senior Hurling Championship: 2007, 2008, 2009, 2010
- National Hurling League: 2009
- All-Ireland Under-21 Hurling Championship: 2003
- Leinster Under-21 Hurling Championship: 2003
- Leinster Minor Hurling Championship: 1998, 1999

Sporting positions
| Preceded by Paul Shefflin | Kilkenny minor hurling team captain 1999 | Succeeded by Tommy Walsh |
