= Brian Begley (dual player) =

Irish sportsman

Personal information
- Native name: Briain Ó Beaglaoich (Irish)
- Born: 20 October 1979 (age 47) Mungret, County Limerick, Ireland
- Height: 6 ft 5 in (196 cm)

Sport
- Football Position: Full-forward
- Hurling Position: Full-forward
Club
- Years: Club
- 1997–: Mungret/St Paul's
Inter-county
Years	County	Apps (scores)
2003 2001–2007	Limerick (F); Limerick (H)	2 (0–1); 20 (7–27)
Inter-county titles
	Football	Hurling
Munster Titles	0	0
All-Ireland Titles	0	0
League titles	0	0
All-Stars	0	0

Brian Begley (born 20 October 1979) is an Irish sportsman. He plays hurling and Gaelic football with his local club Mungret/St Paul's and was a member of the Limerick senior inter-county team in both codes from 2001 until 2007.

== Playing career ==
=== Club ===
Begley plays his club hurling with his local Mungret/St Paul's club.

=== Inter-county ===
Begley first came to prominence on the inter-county scene as a member of the Limerick under-21 team. He won a Munster title at this level in 2000 before later collecting an All-Ireland Under-21 Hurling Championship medal following a victory over Galway. It was Limerick's first step towards three such titles in-a-row; however, Begley was over-age for the latter two victories. By this stage, he had joined the county senior team. Following the county's victory over Cork in the Munster Senior Hurling Championship in 2001, Limerick failed to win a game in the province until their 2007 Munster SHC semi-final victory over Tipperary. This was achieved following a three-game saga; however, Begley's side later lost the Munster SHC final to Waterford. Limerick beat Waterford in the subsequent All-Ireland SHC semi-final, setting up an All-Ireland SHC final meeting with Kilkenny on 2 September 2007. While Begley scored a goal and won a penalty, his side lost by seven points to Kilkenny, on a scoreline of 2–19 to 1–15.

== Football ==
Begley won a Munster Under-21 Football Championship with Limerick in 2000, and played in the All-Ireland U21FC final. but the team lost to Tyrone. With the Limerick senior team he played in two Munster Senior Football Championship in 2003 and 2004 but lost both times to Kerry in 2004 only after a replay.

== Personal life ==
His cousin Cian won the 2005–06 All-Ireland Senior Club Football Championship title with Salthill-Knocknacarra.
