= Eddie Brennan =

Irish hurling manager and former player

Personal information
- Native name: Éamonn Ó Braonáin (Irish)
- Nickname: Fast Eddie
- Born: 2 October 1978 (age 48) Waterford, Ireland
- Occupation: Detective Garda
- Height: 5 ft 11 in (180 cm)

Sport
- Sport: Hurling
- Position: Left corner-forward
Club*
Years	Club	Apps (scores)
2000–2019	Graigue–Ballycallan	35 (11-66)
Club titles
- Kilkenny titles: 2
- Leinster titles: 1
- All-Ireland Titles: 0
Inter-county**
Years	County	Apps (scores)
2000–2012	Kilkenny	48 (26-63)
Inter-county titles
- Leinster titles: 11
- All-Irelands: 8
- NHL: 5
- All Stars: 4
- * club appearances and scores correct as of 16:40, 17 January 2021. **Inter County team apps and scores correct as of 18:58, 4 June 2018.

Edward Joseph Brennan (born 2 October 1978) is an Irish hurling manager and former player. His league and championship career with the Kilkenny senior team lasted twelve seasons from 2000 until 2011. Brennan was the manager of the Laois senior hurling team from 2019 to 2020.

Brennan played competitive hurling in his final year at St Kieran's College, having earlier come to prominence as a dual player at minor levels with the Graigue–Ballycallan club. He won dual championship medals with the minor and under-21 teams, before later joining the club's junior team. Brennan eventually made the break onto the Graigue–Ballycallan senior team and won a Leinster medal in 2000, having earlier won a county senior championship medal.

Brennan made his debut on the inter-county scene at the age of twenty when he was selected for the Kilkenny under-21 team. He won an All-Ireland medal in this grade in 1999. He made his senior debut during the 2000 league. Over the course of the following twelve seasons Brennan won eight All-Ireland medals, beginning with a lone triumph in 2000, back-to-back titles in 2002 and 2003, a record-equalling four championships in-a-row from 2006 to 2009 and a final winners' medal in 2011. He also won eleven Leinster medals and five National Hurling League medals. Brennan played his last game for Kilkenny in September 2011 and announced his retirement on 14 January 2012.

After being chosen on the Leinster inter-provincial team for the first time in 2002, Brennan was a regular on the starting fifteen at various times until 2009. During that time he won four Railway Cup medals.

In retirement from playing Brennan combined his policing career with a new position as a sports broadcaster. His media career began with RTÉ in 2012, where he started as a studio analyst with the flagship programme the Sunday Game.

Even during his playing days Brennan came to be recognised as one of the greatest players of his era. As one of the most prolific goal-scorers of the decade, he won four All Star Awards, three Gaelic Players' Awards and was a nominee for Hurler of the Year in 2008. Brennan was named as one of the 125 greatest stars of the GAA as part of the GAA 125 celebrations in 2009, the same year he was selected at right corner-forward on the Leinster team of the past twenty-five years.

== Playing career ==
=== St Kieran's College ===
During his schooling at St Kieran's College in Kilkenny, Brennan was overlooked for the college's senior hurling team until his final year. On 23 March 1997, he scored a point from right wing-forward in a 2-11 to 0-14 Leinster final defeat by Good Counsel College from New Ross.

=== Graigue–Ballycallan ===
Brennan joined the Graigue-Ballycallan club at a young age and played in all grades at juvenile and underage levels. On 7 October 1996, he scored a decisive 44th-minute goal when the club defeated Dunnamaggin by 2-10 to 0-11 to win the Kilkenny Minor Championship. The following year his underage success continued when he won a Kilkenny Under-21 Championship medal after an 0-11 to 0-06 defeat of Rower–Inistioge in the final.

Brennan subsequently joined the Graigue–Ballycallan junior team, however, he found it difficult to break onto the club's senior team. In spite of this he won a Kilkenny Senior Championship medal as a non-playing substitute on 1 November 1998 after a 1-14 to 0-12 defeat of Fenians.

On 15 October 2000, Brennan scored two points from play when Graigue–Ballycallan won a second Kilkenny Championship in three years after a 0-16 to 0-09 defeat of O'Loughlin Gaels in the final. Later that season he won a Leinster Championship medal at left corner-forward after a 0-14 to 1-08 defeat of University College Dublin in the decider. On 16 April 2001, Brennan scored four points from play in Graigue–Ballycallan's 3-24 to 2-19 extra-time defeat by Athenry in the All-Ireland final.

Brennan later played for Graigue–Ballycallan in the Kilkenny Intermediate Championship after the team was relegated, before lining out for the club's second team in the Kilkenny Junior Championship.

=== Kilkenny ===
==== Underage career ====
Having never played minor hurling, Brennan first played for Kilkenny at under-21 level. He made his first appearance for the team on 23 June 1999, scoring two points in a 2-14 to 1-09 Leinster Championship semi-final defeat of Dublin. He later won a provincial winners' medal after a 1-17 to 1-06 defeat of Offaly in the final. On 19 September 1999, Brennan scored a decisive goal in Kilkenny's 1-13 to 0-14 All-Ireland final victory. It was his last game in the under-21 grade.

==== Early senior successes ====
Brennan made his senior debut for Kilkenny on 26 March 2000, scoring 2-03 in a 2-14 to 2-09 National Hurling League defeat of Tipperary. Later that season he made his first appearance in the Leinster Championship against Wexford before coming on as a substitute for Henry Shefflin in the final in a 2-21 to 1-13 defeat of Offaly. On 10 September 2000, Brennan played in his first All-Ireland final when he was introduced as a 61st-minute substitute for Canice Brennan. He scored Kilkenny's fifth goal of the game in stoppage time before claiming his first All-Ireland medal after a 5-15 to 1-14 defeat of Offaly.

On 8 July 2001, Brennan won a second consecutive Leinster Championship medal after being introduced as a second-half substitute for Denis Byrne in 2-19 to 0-12 defeat of Wexford in the final.

Brennan saw much game time during the 2002 National League and played in all seven of Kilkenny's games, including scoring two points in the 2-15 to 2-14 defeat of Cork in the league final on 5 May 2002. He later won a third Leinster Championship medal after a 0-19 to 0-17 defeat of Wexford in the final. On 8 September 2002, Brennan started in his first All-Ireland final and scored one point on the way to collecting his second winners' medal in the 2-20 to 0-19 defeat of Clare.

On 5 May 2003, Brennan was described as having his "best day ever" in a Kilkenny jersey when he scored 1-03 and won his second successive National League medal after a 5-15 to 5-14 defeat of Tipperary in the final. He later won a third successive Leinster Championship medal after scoring 1-01 in a 2-23 to 2-12 defeat of Wexford in the final. On 7 September 2003, Brennan lined out in his fourth All-Ireland final, however, having been Kilkenny's main strike forward up to then, he had "a shocker, hardly touching the ball and hardly managing a single clean strike". He was substituted by Jimmy Coogan in the 70th minute but still won a third All-Ireland medal after a 1-14 to 1-11 defeat of Cork. In spite of a disappointing display in the final, Brennan's performances throughout the year were rewarded with an All Star Award.

Brennan lined out against Cork in his fourth All-Ireland final on 12 September 2004. After missing a goal chance in the first half, he was held scoreless for the rest of the game which ended with a 0-17 to 0-09 defeat for Kilkenny.

On 2 May 2005, Brennan came on as a substitute for Richie Power and scored two points in Kilkenny's National League final defeat of Clare. He later scored two points on the way to collecting his fifth Leinster Championship medal after a 0-22 to 1-16 defeat of Wexford in the final.

==== Four in-a-row ====
Brennan played only a handful of games during the 2006 National League, however, he claimed a fourth league winners' medal as a non-playing substitute after Kilkenny's five-point win over Limerick in the final. His only Leinster Championship appearance that year came in the 1-23 to 2-12 defeat of Wexford in the final in which he claimed his sixth Leinster medal. On 3 September 2006, Brennan scored a point from right wing-forward in Kilkenny's 1-16 to 1-13 defeat of Cork in the All-Ireland final. As well as winning his fourth All-Ireland winners' medal, he ended the season by winning a second All Star Award.

On 1 July 2007, Brennan won a seventh Leinster Championship medal after scoring a point in the 2-24 to 1-12 defeat of Wexford in the final. On 2 September 2007, he was at right wing-forward for the All-Ireland final against Limerick. Brennan was the game's top scorer with 1-05 from play and won his fifth All-Ireland winners' medal and was named man of the match after a 2-19 to 1-15 victory. He ended the season with a third All Star Award.

Brennan won a seventh Leinster Championship medal on 6 July 2008 after scoring 2-02 from play in a 5-21 to 0-17 defeat of Wexford in the final. On 7 September 2008, he scored 2-04 from play and won his sixth All-Ireland medal after a 3-30 to 1-13 defeat of Waterford in the All-Ireland final. Brennan was later named as the man of the match. He ended the year by winning a fourth All Star Award, while he was also a nominee for Hurler of the Year.

After playing in all of Kilkenny's group stage games during the 2009 National League, Brennan won a fifth league winners' medal on 3 May 2009 after a 4-17 to 2-26 extra time defeat of Tipperary in the final. He described the victory as one of his career favourites. He later won an eighth Leinster Championship medal after a 2-18 to 0-18 defeat of Dublin, however, he was substituted in the 62nd minute after scoring only one point from play. On 6 September 2009, Brennan was at right wing-forward for the All-Ireland final against Tipperary. He was most prominent in the first half and scored three points from play in a 2-22 to 0-23 victory. It was his seventh All-Ireland winners' medal while it was also a record-equalling fourth successive title for Kilkenny.

==== Continued dominance ====
On 4 July 2010, Brennan was a 10th Leinster Championship medal after a 1-19 to 1-12 defeat of Galway in the final. It was the two teams' first ever meeting in a provincial decider. On 5 September 2010, Brennan lined out in his ninth All-Ireland final as Kilkenny aimed to become the first team to win five successive titles. He was held scoreless throughout the game as Tipperary went on to win the title by 4-17 to 1-18.

Brennan scored a total of 4-10 after starting in all eight of Kilkenny's games, including the final defeat by Dublin, during their unsuccessful National League campaign in 2011. In the subsequent Leinster Championship, he came on as a substitute in the 1-26 to 1-15 semi-final defeat of Wexford, however, Brennan won his 11th provincial winners' medal as a non-playing substitute following a 4-17 to 1-15 win over Dublin. It was his first time in his career that he failed to score in a Leinster Championship campaign. After coming on as a substitute in the All-Ireland semi-final defeat of Waterford, Brennan returned to the starting fifteen at right wing-forward for the All-Ireland final against Tipperary on 4 September 2011. In the second half of the game, he was instrumental in the scoring of Kilkenny's second goal by making an attacking run and laying off the ball to eventual scorer Richie Hogan to give Kilkenny an eight-point lead. Kilkenny went on to win the game by 2-17 to 1-16, with Brennan winning his eighth All-Ireland medal.

==== Retirement ====
Brennan announced his retirement from inter-county hurling on 14 January 2012 stating that he had "no regrets" about the decision. Upon retirement, Brennan received many plaudits for the achievements he earned throughout his career.

=== Leinster ===
Brennan was first selected to play for the Leinster inter-provincial team on 2 November 2002, scoring 1-03 in a 3-18 to 2-12 semi-final defeat of Connacht. The following day he lined out in the final and won his first Railway Cup medal after scoring 1-03 again in a 4-15 to 3-17 defeat of Munster.

After a number of seasons off the team, Brennan returned to the Leinster team again and lined out in his second final as captain of the team on 28 October 2006. He scored six points in total as Leinster defeated Connacht by 1-23 to 0-17.

Brennan won a third Railway Cup winners' medal on 1 November 2008 after Leinster's 1-15 to 1-12 defeat of Munster in the final.

On 14 March 2009, Brennan lined out with Leinster for the final time. He won his fourth Railway Cup winners' medal after scoring three points in Leinster's 3-18 to 1-17 defeat of Connacht in the final.

=== Ireland ===
In October 2008, Brennan was called up to the Ireland team for the International Series. He scored two points in the 1-10 to 1-09 defeat by Scotland in the final at Nowlan Park.

== Management and coaching career ==
=== Lisdowney ===
Brennan began his management career at club level in 2013 when he took charge of the Lisdowney junior hurling team. On 20 October 2013, he guided Lisdowney to their first Kilkenny Junior Championship in 53 years after a 2-16 to 1-18 defeat of Bennettsbridge in the final.

=== Kilkenny ===
Brennan was appointed manager of the Kilkenny under-21 hurling team on 9 November 2015. In his opening game in charge on 25 May 2016, Kilkenny were knocked out of the Leinster Championship after a surprise 1-11 to 0-12 defeat by Westmeath. The result against Brennan's team was regarded with astonishment, even years later.

In his second season in charge, Brennan guided Kilkenny to the Leinster Championship title after a 0-30 to 1-15 defeat of Wexford in the final. On 9 September 2017, Kilkenny suffered a six-point defeat by Limerick in the All-Ireland final. Brennan later stepped down as manager of the team.

=== Killenaule ===
In January 2018, Brennan joined the Killenaule senior hurling management team as coach. In his only season with the team, he helped guide Killenaule to a South Tipperary Championship after a 0-20 to 1-12 defeat of Mullinahone in the final.

=== Laois ===
==== 2019 season ====
On 10 September 2018, Brennan was ratified as the manager of the Laois senior hurling team. His pre-season preparations were hampered by not having a full complement of players available to him, including team captain Ross King who opted to leave the panel after suffering a serious facial injury in a club game. Brennan later said: "“It’s something I just do not get. I just can’t understand why lads would not want to hurl for their county. To me if you excel with your club, there should be a drive and a grá to do that."

Laois's National League campaign saw the team qualify for the knock-out stages after a defeat of Offaly and a draw with Carlow in Division 1B. Their league campaign ended at the quarter-final stage after a 2-22 to 0-11 defeat of eventual champions Limerick.

Prior to the start of the Joe McDonagh Cup, Brennan received a boost when Ross King returned to the panel. After remaining undefeated in the group stage following three wins and a draw, Laois qualified to play Westmeath in the final on 30 June 2019. Laois ended the game as champions following a 3-16 to 1-21 victory which guaranteed their entry to the All-Ireland Championship. On 7 July 2019, Laois recorded a shock 1-22 to 0-23 defeat of Dublin to qualify for a first All-Ireland quarter-final since 1979 a week later. Laois's season ended with a 2-25 to 1-18 defeat by Tipperary.

==== 2020 season ====
Brennan's second season in charge saw Laois preserve their Division 1 status in the National League, in spite of losing all bar one of their group stage matches and finishing just outside the relegation play-off position. Laois's Leinster Championship campaign saw the team suffer a 2-31 to 0-23 defeat by Dublin at the quarter-final stage, as the championship format reverted to a straight knock out due to the COVID-19 pandemic. Brennan's side failed to record a championship victory and they exited at the hands of Clare in the All-Ireland Qualifiers.

A post-season interview by Brennan with Colm Parkinson on The GAA Hour podcast caused controversy as certain "off the record" elements in which he was severely critical of the Laois County Board were broadcast in error. Brennan stepped down as manager on 24 November 2020. The podcast controversy over his criticisms of county board officials was cited during media coverage of his resignation.

=== Cuala ===
In December 2020, Brennan was announced as a new coach at Cuala alongside manager John Twomey.

== Punditry ==
Since his retirement from inter-county, Brennan has appeared as a pundit on RTÉ Television's The Sunday Game.

== Personal life ==
Following the completion of his Leaving Certificate Brennan attended the Garda Síochána College in Templemore where he completed a Bachelor of Arts in police studies. He currently works in Portlaoise.

In December 2009 Brennan married Olivia Ryan from Portroe, County Tipperary. Brennan's side had defeated Tipperary in the All-Ireland final earlier that year.

Brennan has been an analyst on The Sunday Game for their coverage of the All-Ireland Senior Hurling Championship since 2012.

== Career statistics ==
=== As a player ===
Team	Year	National League			Leinster		All-Ireland		Total	
Team	Year	Division	Apps	Score	Apps	Score	Apps	Score	Apps	Score
Kilkenny	2000	Division 1	2	3-03	2	1-00	1	1-00	5	5-03
Kilkenny	2001	Division 1	1	1-00	2	2-02	1	0-00	4	3-02
Kilkenny	2002	Division 1	7	3-17	2	1-03	2	0-02	11	4-22
Kilkenny	2003	Division 1	9	3-10	2	2-01	2	1-04	13	6-15
Kilkenny	2004	Division 1	8	3-07	1	1-01	6	4-09	15	8-17
Kilkenny	2005	Division 1	5	1-05	1	0-02	1	2-04	7	3-11
Kilkenny	2006	Division 1	3	1-02	1	0-02	3	0-03	7	1-07
Kilkenny	2007	Division 1	7	2-18	2	0-03	3	3-07	12	5-28
Kilkenny	2008	Division 1	5	1-14	2	2-04	2	2-05	9	5-23
Kilkenny	2009	Division 1	8	0-15	2	1-01	2	1-05	12	2-21
Kilkenny	2010	Division 1	2	0-00	2	1-02	2	1-01	6	2-03
Kilkenny	2011	Division 1	8	4-10	1	0-00	2	0-02	11	4-12
Total			65	22-101	20	11-21	27	15-42	112	48-164

=== As a manager ===
As of match played 14 November 2020.

Managerial league-championship record by team and tenure
Team	From	To	Record				
Team	From	To	P	W	D	L	Win %
Laois	10 September 2018	24 November 2020	20	7	2	11	35.0

== Honours ==
=== Playing career ===
Graigue–Ballycallan

- Leinster Senior Club Hurling Championship (1): 2000
- Kilkenny Senior Hurling Championship (2): 1998, 2000
- Kilkenny Intermediate Hurling Championship (1): 2018
- Leinster Intermediate Club Hurling Championship (1): 2018
- Kilkenny Under-21 Hurling Championship (1): 1997
- Kilkenny Under-21 Football Championship (1): 1995
- Kilkenny Minor Hurling Championship (2): 1994, 1996

Kilkenny

- All-Ireland Senior Hurling Championship (8): 2000, 2002, 2003, 2006, 2007, 2008, 2009, 2011
- Leinster Senior Hurling Championship (11): 2000, 2001, 2002, 2003, 2005, 2006, 2007, 2008, 2009, 2010, 2011
- National Hurling League (5): 2002, 2003, 2005, 2006, 2009
- Walsh Cup (4): 2005, 2006, 2007, 2009
- All-Ireland Under-21 Hurling Championship (1): 1999
- Leinster Under-21 Hurling Championship (1): 1999

Leinster

- Railway Cup (4): 2003, 2006, 2008, 2009

=== Management career ===
Lisdowney

- Kilkenny Junior Hurling Championship (1): 2013

Killenaule

- South Tipperary Senior Hurling Championship (1): 2018

Kilkenny

- Leinster Under-21 Hurling Championship (1): 2017

Laois

- Joe McDonagh Cup (1): 2019

Achievements
Preceded by John Gardiner	Railway Cup Hurling Final winning captain 2006	Succeeded by John Mullane
Preceded by Colm Bonnar	Joe McDonagh Cup winning manager 2019	Succeeded by Darren Gleeson
Awards
Preceded by Aidan Fogarty	All-Ireland Senior Hurling Final; Man of the Match; 2007	Succeeded by Brian Cody
Sporting positions
Preceded by Brian Ryan	Kilkenny Under-21 Hurling Manager; 2015-2017	Succeeded by D. J. Carey
Preceded by Éamonn Kelly	Laois Senior Hurling Manager; 2018-2020	Succeeded by Séamus Plunkett
