= P. J. Delaney (hurler, born 1984) =

Irish hurler

P.J. Delaney
Personal information
- Born: 17 March 1984 (age 42) Johnstown, County Kilkenny
- Height: 6 ft 2 in (188 cm)

Sport
- Sport: Hurling
- Position: Goalkeeper
Club
- Years: Club
- 2002-present: Fenians
Club titles
- Kilkenny titles: 2
- Leinster titles: 2
- All-Ireland Titles: 1
Inter-county
Years	County	Apps (scores)
2006-present	Kilkenny	3 (0-00)
Inter-county titles
- Leinster titles: 4 (3 as sub)
- All-Irelands: 4 4 as sub)
- NHL: 2 (2 as sub)
- All Stars: 0

P. J. Delaney (born 17 March 1984 in Johnstown, County Kilkenny) is an Irish sportsperson. He plays hurling with his local club Fenians and was a member of the Kilkenny senior inter-county team from 2006.
