= Willie Ryan (Tipperary hurler) =

Irish hurler

Personal information
- Native name: Liam Ó Riain (Irish)
- Born: 29 December 1984 (age 41) Toomevara, County Tipperary

Sport
- Sport: Hurling
- Position: Full-forward
Club
- Years: Club
- 2003-present: Toomevara
Club titles
- Tipperary titles: 4
- Munster titles: 2
- All-Ireland Titles: 0
Inter-county
| Years | County | Apps (scores) |
| 2006-present | Tipperary | 14 (3-22) |
Inter-county titles
- Munster titles: 2 (1 as sub)
- All-Irelands: 0
- NHL: 1
- All Stars: 0

Willie Ryan (born 29 December 1984 in Toomevara, County Tipperary) is an Irish sportsperson. He plays hurling with his local club Toomevara and has been a member of the Tipperary senior inter-county team since 2006.

== Playing career ==
=== Club ===
Ryan plays his club hurling with his local club in Toomevara and has enjoyed much success.

In 2003 Ryan's side reached the final of the county senior championship with Thurles Sarsfields providing the opposition. A high-scoring game developed, however, at the full-time whistle Toomevara were the champions by 3–19 to 3-14 and Ryan collected a county winners' medal. This was a fourth consecutive county final defeat for Thurles Sarsfields. Toomevara later represented Tipperary in the provincial club championship, however, they were defeated at the semi-final stage.

2004 saw Ryan line out in a second consecutive county final. Éire Óg Anacarty provided the opposition on that occasion and put up a good fight. Toomevara's goal-scoring ability proved the key as Ryan's side won the game by 4–12 to 2–12. Toomevara once again represented the county in the provincial series and reached the final. Waterford champions Mount Sion provided the opposition and an unusual game unfolded. Toomevara trailed by seven points at one stage, however, they battled back with Ryan hitting 1-1 from play. At the full-time whistle Toomevara were the provincial champions by 1–14 to 1-13 and Ryan collected a Munster club winners' medal. Toomevara later fell by 3–12 to 1–11 to Athenry in the All-Ireland semi-final.

Toomevara were foiled in their aim of capturing three county titles in-a-row in 2005, however, Ryan's team bounced back the following year and reached the final once again. Nenagh Éire Óg provided the opposition and another high-scoring game ensued. In the end, Toomevara secured a 1–21 to 2–14 victory and Ryan added a third county winners' medal to his ever-growing collection. Toomevara continued their march and reached the final of the provincial championship. Cork club champs Erin's Own were the opponents and a controversial game developed. Deep into injury time both sides were level and a replay looked likely. Toomevara fought back and scored a late point to secure a 2–9 to 2–8 victory. The Erin's Own players were incensed at some of the referee's decisions, however, Toomevara won the game Ryan added a second Munster club winners' medal to his collection. The Tipp side later played Ballyhale Shamrocks in the All-Ireland semi-final. Twelve points ahead at one stage, disaster struck for Ryan's side as the Kilkenny side fought back while talismanic figure Tommy Dunne was red-carded. In the end victory went to Ballyhale by 2–20 to 3–14.

2008 saw Ryan line out in a fourth county championship final in six years. Thurles Sasrfields provided the opposition for the second time, however, Toomevara's Eoin Brislane had the game of his life. He finished the day with 1-5 from play and was a large factor in 'Toome's' 2–14 to 0–17 victory. It was Ryan's fourth county winners' medal while he also preserved his unbeaten run in county championship decider.

=== Minor & under-21 ===
Ryan first came to prominence on the inter-county scene as a member of the Tipperary minor hurling team in the early 2000s. In 2002 Tipp reached the final of the Munster championship for the second year in succession with Cork providing the opposition. Ryan came on as a substitute and a close game developed. At the full-time whistle Tipp were the champions once again by 3–7 to 2-7 and Ryan collected a Munster winners' medal in the minor grade. By the time Tipperary qualified for the All-Ireland final against Kilkenny, Ryan was a key member of the half-forward line. That game turned into an absolute rout as Tipp failed to deal with the Kilkenny challenge. After the sixty minutes were played Ryan's side were well beaten by 3–15 to 1–7.

Ryan subsequently joined the Tipperary under-21 hurling team. In 2004 he lined out in the provincial decider against Cork. Tipp were ahead coming into the final stages and survived a late rally by 'the Rebels' to secure a 1–16 to 1–13 victory and a Munster under-21 winners' medal. A subsequent trouncing of Down set up an All-Ireland final meeting with Kilkenny. It was another black day for Tipperary's underage hurlers as 'the Cats' were dominant throughout the game. A remarkable 3–21 to 1–6 score line resulted in a huge defeat for Ryan's team.

A defeat by Cork in the provincial under-21 decider in 2005 brought Ryan's tenure on the under-21 team to an end.

=== Senior ===
Ryan made his senior championship debut as a substitute against Limerick in a provincial quarter-final game in 2006. Tipp won that game, however, Ryan played no part in the subsequent Munster semi-final victory and Munster final defeat by Cork. He was introduced as a substitute again in Tipperary's All-Ireland quarter-final defeat by Waterford.

In 2007 Ryan either started or was introduced as a substitute in all of Tipperary's championship games. The year was a fruitless one for 'the premier county' as Tipp were eventually dumped out of the championship by Wexford in the All-Ireland quarter-final.

Liam Sheedy replaced Babs Keating as manager for 2008 and the year began well. Ryan's side remained undefeated in their National Hurling League campaign before meeting Galway in the final. In an exciting game Tipp emerged victorious by 3–18 to 3-16 and Ryan collected a National League winners’ medal. Ryan, however, in spite of starting against Cork in the opening round of the provincial championship, played no further part in Tipperary's hurling campaign.

At the start of 2009 Tipperary were regarded as the main challengers to Kilkenny's assault on the four-in-a-row of All-Ireland championship titles. Furthermore, Ryan was named as captain of the Tipperary senior hurling team for the year. Both Tipperary and Kilkenny lined out against each other in the final of the National League. Tipperary stormed into a decisive lead as they took the game by the scruff of the; however, ‘the Cats’ clawed their way back into the game. At the end of normal time both sides were level. A period of extra-time followed, however, in spite of a 2–26 to 4–17 defeat, Ryan's side were widely lauded for their performance. The subsequent championship campaign saw Tipp reach the Munster final for a second consecutive year, however, Ryan was not named on the starting fifteen against Waterford. He did, however, come on as a substitute. Tipperary raced into a decisive lead at the interval, however, the Decies fought back to narrow the deficit and maybe cause an upset. In the end Tipp won the game by 4–14 to 2–16. It was Ryan's first Munster winners’ medal on the field of play, while he also had the honour of collecting the Munster Cup on behalf of his team and county. This victory allowed Tipperary to advance to an All-Ireland semi-final meeting with Limerick in Croke Park.

Sporting positions
| Preceded by Paul Ormonde | Tipperary Senior Hurling Captain; 2009 | Succeeded by Incumbent |
