= 1999 All-Ireland Under-21 Hurling Championship =

All-Ireland Under-21 Hurling Championship 1999
Championship Details
- Dates: 2 June 1999 – 21 September 1999
- Teams: 17

All Ireland Champions
- Winners: Kilkenny (7th win)
- Captain: Ger Fennelly
- Manager: Richie Power

All Ireland Runners-up
- Runners-up: Galway
- Captain: Rory Gantley
- Manager: Noel Lane

Provincial Champions
- Munster: Tipperary
- Leinster: Kilkenny
- Ulster: Antrim
- Connacht: Not Played

Championship Statistics
- Top Scorer: Henry Shefflin (4-24)

The 1999 All-Ireland Senior Hurling Championship was the 36th staging of the All-Ireland Under-21 Hurling Championship since its establishment by the Gaelic Athletic Association in 1964. The championship began on 2 June 1999 ended on 21 September 1999.

Cork entered the championship as the defending champions, however, they were beaten by Clare in the Munster semi-final.

On 19 September 1999, Kilkenny won the championship following a 1-13 to 0-14 defeat of Galway in the All-Ireland final. This was their 7th All-Ireland title overall and their first in five championship seasons.

Kilkenny's Henry Shefflin was the championship's top scorer with 4-24.

== Results ==
=== Leinster Under-21 Hurling Championship ===
Quarter-finals

2 June 1999 Quarter-final	Meath	2-06 - 2-08	Dublin	St. Loman's Park
	N Horan 1-3, F McMahon 1-0, J Burke 0-2, N Reilly 0-1.		E Curley 1-0, S McDonnell 1-0, E Carroll 0-2, D Donnelly 0-2, A de Paor 0-1, M Kenny 0-1, D Foley 0-1, T McGrane 0-1.	Referee: L Doyle (Wexford)

5 June 1999 Quarter-final	Wexford	4-18 - 1-08	Laois	Nowlan Park
	B Goff 2-3, C McGrath 0-8 (6f), K Furlong 1-1, M Redmond and B O'Leary 0-2 each, P Carley 1-0, D Scallan and R Stafford 0-1 each.	Report	R Jones 0-4 (3f, 1 line cut) D Rooney (1f) and G Walsh (1f) 0-2 each, P Mahon 1-0.	Referee: P Dunphy (Kilkenny)

Semi-finals

23 June 1999 Semi-final	Kilkenny	2-14 - 1-09	Dublin	Nowlan Park
	H Shefflin 2-5, M Gordon 0-3, E Brennan 0-2, J O'Neill 0-2, P Buggy 0-1, J Hoyne 0-1.		T McGrane 0-7, S Ryan 1-0, D Donnelly 0-1, E Carroll 0-1.

23 June 1999 Semi-final	Offaly	2-13 - 0-10	Wexford	Dr. Cullen Park
	C Gath 0-8, A Hanrahan 1-2, G Oakley 1-1, M Hand 0-1, N Claffey 0-1.		C McGrath 0-6, J Kenny 0-2, K Furlong 0-1, P Carley 0-1.

Final

17 July 1999 Final	Kilkenny	1-17 - 1-06	Offaly	O'Moore Park
	H Shefflin (1-4), E Brennan (0-5), A Cummins (0-2), J Hoyne (0-2), M Gordon (0-2), M Power (0-1), T Drennan (0-1).	Report	B Murphy (1-0), C Gath (0-2), G Oakley (0-1), D Franks (0-1), D Kelly (0-1), T Spain (0-1).	Referee: L Doyle (Wexford)

=== Munster Under-21 Hurling Championship ===
Quarter-finals

23 June 1999 Quarter-final	Kerry	0-8 - 5-15	Tipperary	Ballyheigue Sportsfield
	P Galvin 0-3, M Murphy 0-2, C Harris 0-2, J Wharton 0-1.		M Kennedy 2-1, D Browne 1-4, P O'Brien 1-4, S Butler 1-0, W Maher 0-2, A Doyle 0-2, E O'Neill 0-1, M Ryan 0-1.

24 June 1999 Quarter-final	Limerick	2-10 - 2-15	Cork	Bruff Sportsfield
	D Ryan 1-3, C Hickey 1-0, J Meecall 0-2, W O'Brien 0-2, J Butler 0-1, D O'Brien 0-1, K Carey 0-1.		J Murphy 1-2, B O'Connor 0-5, N Ronan 0-5, P O'Sullivan 1-0, G O'Connor 0-2, P Sexton 0-1.	Referee: J McDonnell (Tipperary)

Semi-finals

14 July 1999 Semi-final	Waterford	2-15 - 4-11	Tipperary	Walsh Park
	K McGrath 2-7, P Fitzgerald 0-2, S Prendergast 0-2, E Bennett 0-1, A Kirwan 0-1, N Curran 0-1, N Power 0-1.		D Browne 3-1, P O'Brien 1-6, P Kelly 0-2, E O'Neill 0-2.	Referee: W Sexton (Limerick)

24 August 1999 Semi-final	Clare	0-15 - 1-10	Cork	Semple Stadium
	A Markham 0-7, J Pyne 0-3, G Quinn 0-1, S Ryan 0-1, H Consodine 0-1, E Flannery 0-1, T Carmody 0-1.	Report	C McCarthy 1-0, D O'Sullivan 0-3, N Ronan 0-3, A Coughlan 0-3, G O'Connor 0-1.	Referee: S Roche (Tipperary)

Final

31 August 1999 Final	Clare	1-15 - 1-18	Tipperary	Cusack Park
	A Markham 1-6, S Ryan 0-3, J Pyne 0-2, B Fitzpatrick 0-1, T Carmody 0-1, G Considine 0-1, J Reddan 0-1.	Report; Highlights	P O'Brien 0-9, D Browne 1-0, P Kelly 0-3, E Kelly 0-2, E O'Neill 0-2, M Ryan 0-1, R Flannery 0-1.	Attendance: 15,000; Referee: M Wadding (Waterford)

=== Ulster Under-21 Hurling Championship ===
Semi-finals

26 June 1999 Semi-final	Derry	2-08 - 0-07	Down	Celtic Park, Derry
				Referee: J McLean (Antrim)

26 June 1999 Semi-final	Armagh	3-11 - 5-11	Antrim	Athletic Grounds, Armagh
				Referee: J Devlin (Tyrone)

Final

18 July 1999 Final	Derry	0-12 - 2-14	Antrim	Dean McGlinchey Park
	D Lockhart (0-4), P McCloskey (0-4), K McCloy (0-2), P Cartin (0-1), R Kennedy (0-1).	Report	J McIntosh (0-4), C Hamill (0-4), A Watt (1-0), K McGrath (1-0), P Close (0-3), P Kelly (0-2), C Cunning (0-1).	Referee: J Gribben (Down)

=== All-Ireland Under-21 Hurling Championship ===
Semi-finals

28 August 1999 Semi-final	Kilkenny	6-27 - 0-10	Antrim	Drogheda Park
	H Shefflin 1-7, K Power 0-8, E Brennan 2-1, JP Corcoran 0-5, P Buggy 1-1, P Delaney 1-1, C Dunne 1-0, J Coogan 0-1, M Gordon 0-1, J O'Neill 0-1, R Mullally 0-1.		P Close 0-3, J McIntosh 0-2, B Kelly 0-2, C Hamill 0-2, G Bell 0-1.	Referee: J McDonnell (Tipperary)

4 September 1999 Semi-final	Galway	3-12 - 1-16	Tipperary	O'Connor Park
	E Cloonan 1-6, D Tierney 2-1, E Tannian 0-2, D Loughrey 0-1, D O'Shaughnessy 0-1, R Gantley 0-1.		E O'Neill 0-5, E Kelly 1-0, M Ryan 0-3, P O'Brien 0-3, P Kelly 0-2, J Francombe 0-2, D Browne 0-1, M Kennedy 0-1, J Carroll 0-1, W Maher 0-1.	Referee: É Morris (Dublin)

Final

19 September 1999 Final	Kilkenny	1-13 - 0-14	Galway	O'Connor Park
	H Shefflin 0-8, E Brennan 1-0, M Gordon 0-2, J O'Neill 0-1, JP Corcoran 0-1, K Power 0-1.		E Cloonan 0-8, E Linnane 0-1, D O'Shaughnessy 0-1, E Tannian 0-1, M Kerins 0-1, E Donoghue 0-1, D Donoghue 0-1.	Referee: G Harrington (Cork)

== Championship statistics ==
=== Top scorers ===
Top scorers overall

Rank	Player	Club	Tally	Total	Matches	Average
1	Henry Shefflin	Kilkenny	4-24	36	4	9.00
2	Paddy O'Brien	Tipperary	2-22	28	4	7.00
3	Declan Browne	Tipperary	5-06	21	4	5.25
4	Eddie Brennan	Kilkenny	3-08	17	4	4.25
4	Eugene Cloonan	Kilkenny	1-14	17	2	8.50
