= Mike FitzGerald (hurler) =

Irish hurler

Personal information
- Native name: Mícheál Mac Gearailt (Irish)
- Born: 1987 (age 38–39) Doon, County Limerick, Ireland
- Occupation: Garda Síochána
- Height: 5 ft 11 in (180 cm)

Sport
- Sport: Hurling
- Position: Right wing-forward
Club
- Years: Club
- 2003-2019: Doon
Club titles
- Limerick titles: 0
College(s)
- Years: College
- Mary Immaculate College; Garda College
College titles
- Fitzgibbon titles: 0
Inter-county
Years	County	Apps (scores)
2004-2008	Limerick	9 (1-15)
Inter-county titles
- Munster titles: 0
- All-Irelands: 0
- NHL: 0
- All Stars: 0

Michael FitzGerald (born 1987) is an Irish hurling coach and former player. At club level, he played with Doon and at inter-county level with the Limerick senior hurling team.

== Career ==
FitzGerald played hurling at all levels as a student at Doon CBS, before eventually joining the school's senior team in the Dr Harty Cup competition. He later played with Mary Immaculate College and was part of their Ryan Cup-winning team in 2006.

At club level, FitzGerald first played for Doon at juvenile and underage levels. He won a Limerick MAHC title in 2003, before later winning a Limerick U21AHC medal after Doon's 2–16 to 1–06 win over Adare in 2006. FitzGerald was still eligible for the minor grade when he made his senior team debut.

FitzGerald first appeared on the inter-county scene with Limerick as goalkeeper on the mnor team in 2003. He progressed to the under-21 team and was team captain in 2007. FitzGerald was called into the senior team in 2004, but left of his own accord a short time later. He returned to the panel in 2006 and won a Waterford Crystal Cup title that year. FitzGerald lined out at wing-forward when Limerick had a 2–17 to 1–15 defeat by Kilkenny in the 2007 All-Ireland final. He ended the season by being shortlisted for Young Hurler of the Year. A series of injuries brought FitzGerald's inter-county career to an end in 2008.

== Honours ==
Mary Immaculate College

- Ryan Cup: 2006

Doon

- Limerick Under-21 Hurling Championship: 2005
- Limerick Minor Hurling Championship: 2003

Limerick

- Waterford Crystal Cup: 2006
