= Diarmuid Kirwan =

Irish hurling referee

Diarmuid Kirwan is an Irish hurling referee. A native of Ballyskenagh, County Offaly he lives in Ovens, County Cork where he played hurling with the local Éire Óg club.

His father, Gerry, also refereed an All-Ireland final and when the son was appointed they became the first father and son duo to have.

Just after throwing the ball in at the beginning of the second half of the 2015 Leinster SHC semi-final between Kilkenny and Wexford, the hurley of Michael Fennelly struck Kirwan and knocked him to the ground.

In the 2016 National Hurling League final, Kirwan controversially decided not to award Waterford a free in injury-time in a defeat to Clare.

Achievements
Preceded by Tommy McIntyre; Incumbent	All-Ireland MHC Final referee 2002; 2003	Succeeded by Retained; John Sexton
Preceded by Barry Kelly	All-Ireland SHC Final referee 2007; 2009	Succeeded by Barry Kelly
