= 2009 All-Ireland Senior Hurling Championship =

Championship details
- Dates: 30 May – 6 September 2009
- Teams: 12

All-Ireland champions
- Winning team: Kilkenny (32nd win)
- Captain: Michael Fennelly
- Manager: Brian Cody

All-Ireland Finalists
- Losing team: Tipperary
- Captain: Willie Ryan
- Manager: Liam Sheedy

Provincial champions
- Munster: Tipperary
- Leinster: Kilkenny
- Ulster: Antrim
- Connacht: Not Played

Championship statistics
- Top Scorer: Joe Canning (3–46)
- Player of the Year: Tommy Walsh
- All-Star Team: See here

The 2009 All-Ireland Senior Hurling Championship was the 123rd staging of the All-Ireland Senior Hurling Championship, the Gaelic Athletic Association's premier inter-county hurling tournament. The draw for the 2000 fixtures took place on 8 October 2008. The championship began on 30 May 2009 and ended on 6 September 2009.

Kilkenny were the defending champions. Antrim and Galway joined the Leinster Championship for the first time.

On 6 September 2009, Kilkenny won the championship following a 2–22 to 0–23 defeat of Tipperary in the All-Ireland final. This was their 32nd All-Ireland title overall, their 7th championship of the decade and a record-equalling fourth All-Ireland title in-a-row.

Galway's Joe Canning was the championship's top scorer with 3–46. Kilkenny's Tommy Walsh won Hurler of the Year.

== Provincial changes ==
Due to a lack of competition in their own respective provinces, Antrim and Galway pushed for entry to the Leinster Championship. At a special meeting of Congress on 4 October 2008, delegates voted to include Galway and Antrim in a restructured Leinster Championship on a trial basis for three years. Dublin, Wexford and Offaly spoke against the move, however, when put to a vote approximately 80% of delegates voted in favour.

== Teams ==
=== General information ===
Twelve counties will compete in the All-Ireland Senior Hurling Championship: seven teams in the Leinster Senior Hurling Championship and five teams in the Munster Senior Hurling Championship.

County	Last provincial title	Last championship title	Position in 2008 Championship	Appearance
Antrim	2008	—	Qualifiers Phase 2	
Clare	1998	1997	Quarter-finals	
Cork	2006	2005	Semi-finals	
Dublin	1961	1938	Qualifiers Phase 3	
Galway	1999	1988	Qualifiers Phase 4	
Kilkenny	2008	2008	Champions	
Laois	1949	1915	Qualifiers Phase 2	
Limerick	1996	1973	Qualifiers Phase 3	
Offaly	1995	1998	Qualifiers Phase 4	
Tipperary	2008	2001	Semi-finals	
Waterford	2007	1959	Runners-up	
Wexford	2004	1996	Quarter-finals	

A total of 12 teams competed in the championship, including all of the teams from the 2008 championship. There were no new entrants. On 3 August 2008, Westmeath won the Christy Ring Cup for the second year in succession, however, there was no promotion mechanism for them to join the top flight.

=== Personnel and team details ===
Team	Colours	Sponsor	Captain(s)	Manager(s)					
Team	Colours	Sponsor	Captain(s)	Manager(s)	Antrim	Saffron and white	Creagh Concrete	Neil McGarry	Terence McNaughton; Dominic McKinley
Clare	Saffron and blue	Vodafone	Brian O'Connell	Mike McNamara					
Cork	Red and white	O2	John Gardiner	Denis Walsh					
Dublin	Navy and blue	Arnotts	Stephen Hiney	Anthony Daly					
Galway	Maroon and white	Supermacs	Ollie Canning	John McIntyre					
Kilkenny	Black and amber	Glanbia	Michael Fennelly	Brian Cody					
Laois	Blue and white	The Heritage Hotel	Brian Campion	Niall Rigney					
Limerick	Green and white	Sporting Limerick	Mark Foley	Justin McCarthy					
Offaly	Green, white and gold	Carroll Cuisine	Ger Oakley	Joe Dooley					
Tipperary	Blue and gold	Enfer	Willie Ryan	Liam Sheedy					
Waterford	White and blue	3	Stephen Molumphy; Ken McGrath	Davy FitzGerald					
Wexford	Purple and yellow	Wexford Cheddar	Diarmuid Lyng	Colm Bonnar					

=== Managerial changes ===
Team	Outgoing manager	Manner of departure	Date of vacancy	Incoming manager	Date of appointment
Limerick	Richie Bennis	Sacked	12 August 2008	Justin McCarthy	7 October 2008
Galway	Tommy Naughton	Resigned	14 September 2008	Anthony Daly	24 November 2008
Wexford	John Meyler	Resigned	7 October 2008	Colm Bonnar	11 November 2008
Galway	Ger Loughnane	Sacked	12 October 2008	John McIntyre	18 November 2008
Cork	John Considine	End of caretaker spell	26 March 2016	Denis Walsh	26 March 2009

== Format ==
The format of the 2009 championship was slightly different from previous years. Firstly, Galway have had no opposition in the Connacht Senior Hurling Championship since 2004. Due to this it was decided at a special meeting of the GAA's congress for Galway to join the Leinster Senior Hurling Championship for a three-year trial period, starting with the 2009 championship. Antrim, being the only Tier 1 team in the Ulster Senior Hurling Championship, also participated in the Leinster Championship on a three-year trial period. Antrim also competed in the Ulster Championship which was run as a separate tournament to the All-Ireland Hurling Championship.

12 counties participated in Tier 1 of the 2009 Championship. These teams were as follows:

- Leinster: Antrim, Dublin, Galway, Kilkenny, Laois, Offaly and Wexford
- Munster: Clare, Cork, Limerick, Tipperary, Waterford

Provincial Championships The Munster championship was played as usual with five teams. The Leinster championship also proceeded as usual, except for the addition of both Antrim and Galway, bringing the total number of competing teams to seven. The Leinster and Munster champions advanced directly to the All-Ireland semi-finals.

All-Ireland Qualifiers The qualifiers gave teams defeated in the provincial championships another chance at winning the All-Ireland. Phase 1: (2 matches) the three Leinster quarter-finalists and the Munster quarter-finalist play off. Phase 2: (2 matches) the two Leinster semi-finalists and two Munster semi-finalists play off. Phase 3: (2 matches) The four winners of Phase 1 and Phase 2 games meet in Phase 3. The two Phase 3 winners advance to the All-Ireland quarter-finals.

All-Ireland Series Quarter-finals: (2 matches) The defeated Munster and Leinster finalists played the winners of the Phase 3 qualifiers. Semi-finals: (2 matches) The Munster and Leinster champions played the winners of the quarter-finals.

Promotion/Relegation

Promotion and relegation between Tier 1 and Tier 2 was in operation in the 2009 championship. The defeated team in the Round 2 match of the Relegation playoffs was demoted to the 2010 Christy Ring Cup, to be replaced by the winners of the 2009 Christy Ring Cup.

== Leinster Senior Hurling Championship ==
Quarter-finals		Semi-finals		Leinster final
Dublin	2–16
Antrim	0–12	Dublin	0–18
Wexford	2–17	Wexford	1–13
Offaly	0–16			Dublin	0–18
Laois	0–17			Kilkenny	2–18
Galway	5–29	Galway	3–13
		Kilkenny	2–20

=== Quarter-finals ===
May 30
Quarter-final

Wexford	2–17 – 0–16	Offaly
S Banville 2–2, D Lyng 0–7, R Jacob, S Doyle, T Waters 0–2 each, D Redmond, A Shore 0–1 each	(Report)	S Dooley 0–4, B Carroll 0–3, B Murphy, J Bergin, K Brady 0–2 each, D Currams, D Horan, R Hanniffy 0–1

Wexford Park, Wexford
Attendance: 8,100
Referee: J Ryan (Tipperary)

May 31
Quarter-final

Laois	0–17 – 5–29	Galway
W Hyland 0–6, B Campion 0–5, J Young 0–4, O Holohan 0–2	(Report)	N Healy 3–5, J Canning 1–10, D Hayes 1–3, K Hynes 0–4, A Callanan, C Donnellan 0–3 each, A Smyth 0–1

O'Moore Park, Portlaoise
Referee: B Gavin (Offaly)

June 7
Quarter-final

Dublin	2–16 – 0–12	Antrim
A McCrabbe 1–9, D O'Callaghan 1–3, D Treacy 0–2, D Curtin, K Flynn 0–1 each	(Report)	K Stewart 0–5, K McKeegan, S Delargy, N McManus, M Herron, CJ McGourty, J Scullion, B Herron 0–1 each

Croke Park, Dublin
Attendance: 75,250
Referee: J McGrath (Westmeath)

=== Semi-finals ===
June 20
Semi-final

Galway	3–13 – 2–20	Kilkenny
J Canning 2–9, N Healy 1–1, A Callanan, C Donnellan, D Hayes 0–1 each	(Report)	H Shefflin 0–10, E Larkin 0–5, R Power, E Brennan 1–0 each, A Fogarty 0–3, D Lyng 0–2

O'Connor Park, Tullamore
Referee: B Kelly (Westmeath)

June 21
Semi-final

Dublin	0–18 – 1–13	Wexford
A McCrabbe 0–10, D Treacy, D O'Callaghan, S Lambert 0–2 each, S Durkin, L Rushe 0–1 each	(Report)	D Lyng 0–7, N Kirwan 1–0, D Redmond 0–2, W Doran, S Banville, S Doyle, R Kehoe 0–1 each

Nowlan Park, Kilkenny
Attendance: 9,490
Referee: C McAllister (Cork)

=== Final ===
July 5
Final

Dublin	0–18 – 2–18	Kilkenny
A McCrabbe 0–12, D Treacy 0–3, J Boland, K Flynn, D O'Callaghan 0–1 each	(Report)	M Comerford 2–4, H Shefflin 0–6, E Larkin, D Lyng 0–2 each, T Walsh, M Rice, E Brennan, A Fogarty 0–1 each

Croke Park, Dublin
Attendance: 29,427
Referee: J Ryan (Tipperary)

== Munster Senior Hurling Championship ==
Quarter-finals
Tipperary	1–19
Cork	0–19

Semi-finals
Tipperary	3–18
Clare	1–22
Limerick	0–17
Waterford	0–25

Munster Final
Tipperary	4–14
Waterford	2–16

=== Quarter-finals ===
May 31
Quarter-final

Tipperary	1–19 – 0–19	Cork
S Callanan 1–3, E Kelly 0–5, N McGrath, L Corbett 0–3 each, B Dunne, S McGrath 0–2 each, J O'Brien 0–1	(Report)	B O'Connor 0–11, J Gardiner 0–3, P Cronin 0–2, N McCarthy, T Kenny, A O hAilpin 0–1 each

Semple Stadium, Thurles
Referee: B Kelly (Westmeath)

=== Semi-finals ===
June 14
Semi-final

Limerick	1–8 – 0–11	Waterford
N Moran 0–4, D Breen 1–0, J Ryan 0–2, S Hickey, A O'Shaughnessy 0–1 each	(Report)	E Kelly 0–6, J Mullane 0–4, S Prendergast 0–1

Semple Stadium, Thurles
Attendance: 25,229
Referee: D Kirwan (Cork)

June 20
Semi-final replay

Limerick	0–17 – 0–25	Waterford
A O’Shaughnessy, N Moran 0–5 each, S Hickey, J Ryan 0–2 each, P Browne, D Breen, D O’Grady 0–1 each	(Report)	E Kelly 0–12, J Mullane 0–6, S Prendergast 0–4, S O’Sullivan, S Molumphy, J Kennedy 0–1 each

Semple Stadium, Thurles
Referee: B Gavin (Offaly)

June 21
Semi-final

Tipperary	3–18 – 1–22	Clare
N McGrath 0–7, J O'Brien 1–2, L Corbett 1–1, S Callanan 1–0, P Kerwick, E Kelly 0–3 each, D Fanning, J Woodlock 0–1 each	(Report)	C Ryan 0–12, D McMahon 1–2, T Griffin, J Clancy, T Carmody 0–2 each, J Conlon, D Barrett 0–1 each

Gaelic Grounds, Limerick
Referee: J Owens (Wexford)

=== Final ===
July 12
Final

Tipperary	4–14 – 2–16	Waterford
L Corbett 2–2, E Kelly 1–3, S Callanan 1–1, N McGrath 0–3, P Kerwick, C O'Mahony, S McGrath, J O'Brien, B Dunne 0–1 each	(Report)	E Kelly 1–7, J Mullane 1–5, S Molumphy 0–2, D Shanahan, R Foley 0–1 each

Semple Stadium, Thurles
Referee: J Sexton (Cork)

== Cup competitions ==
=== Christy Ring Cup (Tier 2) ===
==== Bracket ====
Round 1 Round 2B
Derry	2–15
Wicklow	0–09
Wicklow	3–09
Carlow	4–16
Westmeath	2–21
Kildare	3–19
Mayo	2–20
Westmeath	0–15
Mayo	1–16
Kerry	3–11
Down	3–20
Derry	1–22

Round 2A; Quarter-finals
Kerry	4–21
Derry	2–12
Carlow	1–16
Kildare	1–13
Kildare	1–10
Mayo	1–16
Kerry	2–10
Down	3–11

Semi-finals
Kerry	2–11
Carlow (R)	6–10
Mayo	0–14
Down	4–21

Final
Carlow	1–15
Down	0–14
Relegation Playoff
Westmeath	3–36
Wicklow	1–06

=== Lory Meagher Cup (Tier 4) ===
==== Bracket ====
Round 1 Round 2B
Fermanagh	0–14
Leitrim	1–12
Tyrone	3–09
South Down	5–06
Cavan	3–09
Fermanagh	3–15
Tyrone	3–19
Warwickshire	1–16
Warwickshire	0–14
Longford	1–14
Donegal	0–20
Cavan	1–12

Round 2A; Quarter-finals
Leitrim	1–14
South Down	2–14
Fermanagh	0–08
Donegal	3–20
Tyrone	1–20
Leitrim	3–08
Longford	5–15
Donegal	2–22

Semi-finals
South Down	2–11
Donegal	1–15
Longford	4–09
Tyrone	3–16

Final
Donegal	3–16
Tyrone	5–11

== All-Ireland qualifiers ==
=== Qualifiers phase 1 ===
July 4
Phase 1

Laois	0–18 – 1–12	Antrim
W Hyland 0–7, B Campion, J Brophy 0–3 each, C Delaney, J Walsh 0–2 each, T Fitzgerald 0–1	(Report)	K McKeegan 0–6, N McManus 1–0, M Herron, P Richmond 0–2 each, S Delargy, CJ McGourty 0–1 each

O'Moore Park, Portlaoise
Referee: P O'Connor (Limerick)

July 4
Phase 1

Offaly	1–12 – 3–19	Cork
S Dooley 1–2, B Carroll 0–3, J Bergin, C Coughlan 0–2 each, P Cleary, C Mahon, D Molloy 0–1 each	(Report)	P Horgan 1–5, A O hAilpin 2–1, J O'Connor, B O'Connor 0–4 each, T og Murphy 0–2, T McCarthy, P Cronin, C Naughton 0–1 each

O'Connor Park, Tullamore
Referee: D Murphy (Wexford)

=== Qualifiers phase 2 ===
July 11
Phase 2

Wexford	0–14 – 1–13	Limerick
D Lyng 0–6, R Jacob 0–4, W Doran 0–2, S Doyle, D Redmond 0–1 each	(Report)	A O'Shaughnessy 1–2, P McNamara 0–4, S Hickey 0–2, G O'Mahony, D O'Grady, N Moran, D Sheehan, J O'Brien 0–1 each

Wexford Park, Wexford
Referee: M Wadding (Waterford)

July 11
Phase 2

Clare	1–11 – 2–18	Galway
D McMahon 1–1, P Vaughan, N Gilligan, J Conlon 0–2 each, T Griffin, T Carmody, J Clancy, B Nugent 0–1 each	(Report)	J Canning 0–7, N Healy 1–3, C Donnellan 1–2, A Callanan 0–2, E Lynch, K Hynes, A Smyth, J Gantley 0–1 each

Cusack Park, Ennis
Referee: J Owens (Wexford)

=== Qualifiers phase 3 ===
July 18
Phase 3

Laois	1–14 – 0–20	Limerick
W Hyland 0–8, E Costelloe 1–2, J Brophy 0–2, E Jackman, T Fitzgerald 0–1 each	(Report)	A O'Shaughnessy 0–6, G O'Mahony, P Browne 0–3 each, P McNamara, J O'Brien 0–2 each, J Ryan, D Sheehan, D Breen, D Ryan 0–1 each

Semple Stadium, Thurles
Attendance: 24,136
Referee: C McAllister (Cork)

July 18
Phase 3

Cork	0–15 – 1–19	Galway
B O'Connor 0–9, K Murphy 0–2, J Gardiner, S og O hAilpin, P Horgan, N McCarthy 0–1 each	(Report)	J Canning 0–11, A Smith, D Hayes 0–3 each, J Gantley 1–0, A Callanan, G Farragher 0–1 each

Semple Stadium, Thurles
Attendance: 24,136
Referee: B Gavin (Offaly)

== Relegation play-offs ==
July 25
Round 1

Antrim	0–13 – 1–28	Offaly
K Stewart 0–6, J Campbell, M Herron, J Scullion, P McGill, CJ McGourty, C Donnelly, E McCloskey 0–1 each	(Report)	B Carroll 0–12, K Brady 1–2, B Murphy 0–4, P Cleary, D Molloy, J Bergin 0–2 each, D Franks, S Dooley, O Kealey, J Gorman 0–1 each

Parnell Park, Dublin
Referee: E Morris (Dublin)

July 25
Round 1

Clare	2–24 – 2–18	Wexford
N Gilligan 1–10, B Nugent, J Clancy 0–4 each, M Flaherty 1–0, D McMahon, A Markham 0–2 each, T Griffin, P Vaughan 0–1 each	(Report)	D Lyng 1–11, D Fitzhenry 1–0, D Redmond, S Doyle, J Berry, PJ Nolan, R Jacob, W Doran, H Kehoe 0–1 each

O'Moore Park, Portlaoise
Referee: J McGrath (Westmeath)

It was intended to hold a relegation playoff between Antrim and Wexford, but instead it was decided to allow both compete in the 2010 championship.

== All-Ireland Senior Hurling Championship ==
Quarter-finals
Waterford	1–16
Galway	0–18
Dublin	1–17
Limerick	2–18

Semi-finals
Kilkenny	2–23
Waterford	3–15
Tipperary	6–19
Limerick	2–07

All-Ireland Final
Kilkenny	2–22
Tipperary	0–23

=== All-Ireland quarter-finals ===
July 26
Quarter-final

Waterford	1–16 – 0–18	Galway
E Kelly 0–12, S Walsh 1–0, K Moran 0–2, S Prendergast, J Mullane 0–1 each	(Report)	J Canning 0–9, D Hayes 0–3, G Farragher, A Callinan 0–2 each, J Gantley, A Smith 0–1 each

Semple Stadium, Thurles
Attendance: 30,435
Referee: D Kirwan (Cork)

July 26
Quarter-final

Dublin	1–17 – 2–18	Limerick
A McCrabbe 0–8, L Rushe 1–0, D O'Callaghan 0–2, S Hiney, M Carton, R O'Carroll, L Ryan, D Sweeney, D Treacy, S Durcan 0–1 each	(Report)	G O'Mahoney 0–8, A O'Shaughnessy 0–5, J Ryan 0–4, P McNamara 1–1, B Murray 1–0

Semple Stadium, Thurles
Attendance: 30,435
Referee: M Wadding (Waterford)

=== All-Ireland semi-finals ===
August 9
Semi-final

Kilkenny	2–23 – 3–15	Waterford
H Shefflin 1–14, E Brennan 1–2, E Larkin 0–2, J Fitzpatrick, M Rice, R Power, A Fogarty, R Hogan 0–1 each	(Report)	E Kelly 1–9, S Walsh 2–0, S O'Sullivan, K Moran, S Prendergast, J Mullane, E McGrath, D Shanahan 0–1 each

Croke Park, Dublin
Attendance: 61,962
Referee: B Kelly (Westmeath)

August 16
Semi-final

Tipperary	6–19 – 2–07	Limerick
L Corbett 3–1, E Kelly 1–6, N McGrath 1–3, P Kerwick 1–2, S Callanan, C O'Mahony 0–3 each, J O'Brien 0–1	(Report)	B O'Sullivan 1–1, B Murray 1–0, G O'Mahony 0–2, S Hickey, N Moran, D Breen, A O'Shaughnessy 0–1 each

Croke Park, Dublin
Attendance: 43,808
Referee: B Gavin (Offaly)

=== All-Ireland final ===
September 6
Final

Kilkenny	2–22 – 0–23	Tipperary
H Shefflin 1–8, E Larkin, E Brennan 0–3 each, M Comerford 1–0, R Hogan 0–2, J Tyrrell, T Walsh, D Lyng, R Power, TJ Reid, M Fennelly 0–1 each	(Report)	E. Kelly 0–13, L Corbett 0–4, S Callanan 0–3, N McGrath 0–2, S McGrath 0–1

Croke Park, Dublin
Attendance: 82,106
Referee: D Kirwan (Cork)

== Championship statistics ==
=== Scoring ===
- First goal of the championship: Stephen Banville for Wexford against Offaly (Leinster quarter-final)
- Last goal of the championship: Martin Comerford for Kilkenny against Tipperary (All-Ireland final)
- First hat-trick of the championship: Niall Healy for Galway against Laois (Leinster quarter-final)
- Widest winning margin: 27 points
  - Galway 5–29 : 0–17 Laois (Leinster quarter-final)
- Most goals in a match: 8
  - Tipperary 6–19 : 2–7 Limerick (All-Ireland semi-final)
- Most points in a match: 46
  - Galway 5–29 : 0–17 Laois (Leinster quarter-final)
- Most goals by one team in a match: 6
  - Tipperary 6–19 : 2–7 Limerick (All-Ireland semi-final)
- Most goals scored by a losing team: 3
  - Galway 3–13 : 2–20 Kilkenny (Leinster quarter-final)
  - Waterford 3–15 : 2–23 Kilkenny (All-Ireland semi-final)
- Most points scored by a losing team: 23
  - Tipperary 0–23 : 2–22 Kilkenny (All-Ireland final)

== Player facts ==
=== Retirees ===
The following players played their last game in the 2009 championship:

Player	Team	Date	Opposition	Game	Début
Timmy McCarthy	Cork	July 18	Galway	All-Ireland qualifiers	1999
Damien Fitzhenry	Wexford	July 25	Clare	All-Ireland qualifiers	1993
Tony Griffin	Clare	July 25	Wexford	All-Ireland qualifiers	2002
Niall Gilligan	Clare	July 25	Wexford	All-Ireland qualifiers	1997
Ollie Moran	Limerick	August 16	Tipperary	All-Ireland semi-final	1997
Mark Foley	Limerick	August 16	Tipperary	All-Ireland semi-final	1995

== Monthly awards ==
Month	Vodafone Player of the Month		Opel GPA Player of the Month	
Month	Player	County	Player	County
May	Stephen Banville	Wexford	Eoin Cadogan	Cork
June	Ken McGrath	Waterford	John Mullane	Waterford
July	Michael 'Brick' Walsh	Waterford	John Mullane	Waterford
August	Henry Shefflin	Kilkenny	Henry Shefflin	Kilkenny
September	P.J. Ryan	Kilkenny	Tommy Walsh	Kilkenny

== Statistics ==
=== Top scorers overall ===
Rank	Player	County	Tally	Total	Matches	Average
1	Joe Canning	Galway	3–46	54	5	10.80
2	Eoin Kelly	Waterford	2–46	52	5	10.40
3	Alan McCrabbe	Dublin	1–39	42	4	10.50
4	Henry Shefflin	Kilkenny	2–38	44	4	11.00
5	Eoin Kelly	Tipperary	2–30	36	5	7.20
6	Diarmuid Lyng	Wexford	1–31	34	4	8.50
7	Lar Corbett	Tipperary	6–11	29	5	5.80
8	Niall Healy	Galway	5–9	24	5	4.80
8	Ben O'Connor	Cork	0–24	24	3	8.00
10	Andrew O'Shaughnessy	Limerick	1–20	23	6	3.83

=== Top scorers in a single game ===
Rank	Player	County	Tally	Total	Opposition
1	Henry Shefflin	Kilkenny	1–14	17	Waterford
2	Joe Canning	Galway	2-09	15	Kilkenny
3	Niall Healy	Galway	3-05	14	Laois
3	Diarmuid Lyng	Wexford	1–11	14	Clare
5	Niall Gilligan	Clare	1–10	13	Wexford
5	Joe Canning	Galway	1–10	13	Laois
7	Alan McCrabbe	Dublin	1-09	12	Antrim
7	Alan McCrabbe	Dublin	0–12	12	Kilkenny
7	Eoin Kelly	Waterford	0–12	12	Limerick
7	Colin Ryan	Clare	0–12	12	Tipperary
7	Brian Carroll	Offaly	0–12	12	Antrim
7	Eoin Kelly	Waterford	0–12	12	Galway
7	Eoin Kelly	Waterford	1-09	12	Kilkenny

=== Clean sheets ===
Rank	Goalkeeper	County	Clean sheets
1	Brian Murray	Limerick	3
2	P. J. Ryan	Kilkenny	2
2	Damien Fitzhenry	Wexford	2
2	Colm Callanan	Galway	2
2	Clinton Hennessy	Waterford	2
2	Gary Maguire	Dublin	2
7	Brendaan Cummins	Tipperary	1
7	Ryan McGarry	Antrim	1
7	Tadhg Doran	Laois	1
7	Brian Mullins	Offaly	1
