= List of people with surname O'Brien =

O'Brien
- Language: Irish

Origin
- Derivation: Ó Briain
- Meaning: descendant of Brian
- Region of origin: Munster, Ireland

O'Brien is a surname of Irish origin. It has many variants in the Irish diaspora worldwide, such as Brien, O'Bryan, O'Brian, Brian, O'Brine and O'Bryen, which all claim a general common ancestry. The original Gaelic surname is Ó Briain (feminine maiden form: Ní Bhriain; plural form and feminine marital form: Uí Bhriain).

Notable people with the name include:

== As surname ==
=== A ===
- Aidan O'Brien (born 1969), Irish racehorse trainer
- Aiden O'Brien, Irish football player
- Alan O'Brien, Irish association football player
- Alex O'Brien (born 1970), American tennis player
- Ambrose O'Brien (1885–1968), Canadian founder of the National Hockey Association
- Andrew O'Brien (politician) (fl. 1990s-2010s), US Department of State official
- Jim O'Brien (rugby, born 1897) (Andrew James O'Brien, 1897–1969), New Zealand rugby footballer
- Andy O'Brien (footballer) (born 1979), Irish footballer
- Andy O'Brien (hurler) (born 1988), Irish hurler
- Andy O'Brien (journalist) (1910–1987), Canadian sports journalist
- Andy O'Brien (politician) (1915–2006), Irish Fine Gael senator
- Anne O'Brien (disambiguation), various
- Arthur O'Brien (1878–1951), New Zealand rugby union fullback
- Austin O'Brien (born 1981), American actor and photographer

=== B ===
- Barry O'Brien (born 1957), American TV screenwriter and producer
- Billy O'Brien (baseball) (1860–1911), American baseball player
- Billy O'Brien (footballer), Welsh association football player
- Brendan O'Brien (disambiguation), various
- Brenna O'Brien (born 1991), Canadian actress and voice actor
- Brock O'Brien (born 1988), Australian rules footballer with Fremantle
- Buck O'Brien (1882–1959), pitcher with the Boston Red Sox and the Chicago White Sox
- Burton O'Brien (born 1981), Scottish football player

=== C ===
- Casey O'Brien (b. 2001), American ice hockey player
- Cathy O'Brien (athlete) (b. 1967), American long-distance runner
- Cathy O'Brien (conspiracy theorist) (b. 1957), American purported child-abuse victim
- Cecily O'Bryen (1899–1984), British diving champion
- Charles O'Brien (disambiguation), various
- Christian O'Brien (1914–2001), British geologist, author & historian
- Ciaran O'Brien (born 1987), American soccer coach and player
- Cinders O'Brien, John F., or Darby O'Brien (1867–1892), American baseball pitcher
- Clinton O'Brien (born 1974), Australian rugby league footballer
- Conal O'Brien (born 1956), American television director
- Conan O'Brien (born 1963), US comedian and talk show host
- Connor O'Brien (disambiguation) or
- Conor O'Brien (disambiguation), various people
- Cubby O'Brien (born 1946), American drummer and original Mouseketeer

=== D ===
- Daniel O'Brien (disambiguation), various
- Danielle O'Brien (born 1990), Australian ice dancer
- Danny O'Brien (disambiguation), various
- Darcy O'Brien (1939–1998), American true crime author
- Daryl O'Brien (b. 1941), Australian rules footballer
- Dave O'Brien (actor) (1912–1969), American film actor
- Dave O'Brien (sportscaster), American sportscaster
- David O'Brien (disambiguation), various
- Doug Brien (born 1970), American football placekicker
- Don Brien (born 1959), Canadian sprint canoer
- Declan O'Brien (1965–2022), American film and TV writer and producer
- Declan O'Brien (footballer) (born 1979), with Drogheda United
- Dennis O'Brien (disambiguation), various
- Derek O'Brien (disambiguation), various
- Dermod O'Brien (1865–1906), Irish painter
- Donald O'Brien (disambiguation), various
- Doug O'Brien (born 1984), Canadian ice hockey defenceman
- Dylan O'Brien (b. 1991), American actor

=== E ===
- Ed O'Brien (b. 1968), English musician
- Edmond O'Brien (1915–1985), American actor
- Edna O'Brien (1930–2024), Irish novelist
- Edward O'Brien (disambiguation), various
- Edwin Frederick O'Brien (born 1939), American Catholic prelate
- Eileen O'Brien (disambiguation), various
- Elaine O'Brien (1955–2014), American politician
- Erin O'Brien (writer), American writer
- Erin Joanne O'Brien (1934–2021), American actress
- Eugene O'Brien (disambiguation), various

=== F ===
- Fergal O'Brien (born 1872), Irish professional snooker player
- Fergal O'Brien (trainer) (born 1972), Irish National Hunt trainer
- Fergus O'Brien (1930–2016), Irish politician
- Fitz James O'Brien (1826–1862), American SF and fantasy writer
- Flann O'Brien (Brian O'Nolan, 1911–1966), Irish novelist and satirist

=== G ===
- Gareth O'Brien (born 1991), English rugby league footballer
- Geraldine O'Brien (1922–2014), Irish botanical illustrator
- George O'Brien (disambiguation), various
- Ger O'Brien (born Gerard O'Brien, 1984), Irish footballer
- Gerard O'Brien (disambiguation), various
- Geoffrey O'Brien (born 1948), American poet, editor, and film critic
- Glenn O'Brien (1947–2017), American writer, "The Style Guy"
- Gray O'Brien (born Gerard O'Brien, 1968), Scottish actor
- Gavin O'Brien (born 1993), Irish hurler

=== H ===
- Harry O'Brien, later Héritier Lumumba (born 1986), Australian rules footballer
- Harry J. O'Brien "Shorty" (1884–1955), American football, basketball, baseball coach
- Helen O'Brien (1925–2005), British nightclub owner and spy
- Henry O'Brien (disambiguation), various
- Hod O'Brien (1936–2016), American jazz pianist
- Hugh O'Brien (1827–1895), mayor of Boston

=== I ===
- Iain O'Brien (born 1976), New Zealand cricketer
- Ian O'Brien (born 1947), Australian breaststroke swimmer
- Ignatius O'Brien, 1st Baron Shandon (1857–1930), Lord Chancellor of Ireland, 1913–1918

=== J ===
- Jack O'Brien (disambiguation), various
- Jake O'Brien (ice hockey) (born 2007), Canadian ice hockey player
- Jake O'Brien (fighter) (born 1984), American MMA fighter
- Jake O'Brien (footballer) (born 2001), Irish footballer
- James O'Brien (disambiguation), various
- Jamie O'Brien (disambiguation), various
- Jeremiah O'Brien (1744–1818), US Navy officer of the American Revolutionary War
- Jesse O'Brien (disambiguation), various
- Jim O'Brien (disambiguation), various
- Joan O'Brien (1936–2025), American actress and singer
- Joanne O'Brien, portrait and documentary photographer
- Joe O'Brien (disambiguation), various
- Joey O'Brien (born 1986), Irish football player
- John O'Brien (disambiguation), various
- Joseph O'Brien (disambiguation), various

=== K ===
- Kate O'Brien (disambiguation)
- Katharine O'Brien, American film director
- Katharine O'Brien (disambiguation), other people of that name
- Katherine O'Brien (born 1963), Canadian pediatric infectious disease physician
- Kathleen O'Brien (1914–1991), Australian illustrator and fashion artist
- Katie O'Brien, British tennis player
- Keith O'Brien (1938–2018), Scottish Roman Catholic prelate
- Ken O'Brien (born 1960), American football quarterback
- Kerry O'Brien (disambiguation), various
- Kevin O'Brien (disambiguation), various
- Kieran O'Brien (born 1973), English actor
- Kim O'Brien, American film and television actress
- Kirsten O'Brien (born 1972), British TV presenter
- Kitt O'Brien (born 1990), American football player
- Kitty Wilmer O'Brien (1910–1982), Irish landscape painter

=== L ===
- Larry O'Brien (1917–1990), American politician
- Larry O'Brien (Canadian politician) (born 1949), businessman, mayor of Ottawa
- Laurence O'Brien (1792–1870), Irish merchant and politician in Newfoundland
- Lawrence O'Brien (disambiguation), various

- Lawrence D. O'Brien (1951–2004), Canadian politician representing Labrador

- Leighton O'Brien (born 1976), American soccer player with the Seattle Sounders
- Lévis Brien (born 1955), Quebec politician
- Leo O'Brien (disambiguation), various
- Leonora O'Brien, Irish pharmacist and entrepreneur
- Leslie O'Brien (1908–1995), Governor of the Bank of England
- Leslie O'Brien (cricketer) (1905–1967), played for New South Wales
- Liam O'Brien (disambiguation), various
- Lucy O'Brien (born 1961), writer on women in music
- Lucy O'Brien (philosopher) (born 1964), at University College, London
- Lucy O'Brien (doctor) (1923–2006), Irish missionary in Africa
- Luke O'Brien (born 1988), English footballer with Bradford City

=== M ===
- Margaret O'Brien (born 1937), American actress
- Margaret O'Brien (politician) (born 1973), Michigan Republican
- Maria O'Brien (actress) (1950–2026), American actress and acting coach
- Mariah O'Brien (born 1971), American actress and interior designer
- Mark O'Brien (disambiguation), various
- Mary Eileen O'Brien, American academic administrator
- Matthew O'Brien (mathematician) (1814–1855), Irish mathematician
- Maureen O'Brien (born 1943), English actress in the Doctor Who series
- Michael O'Brien (disambiguation), various
- Michele O'Brien (born 1980), soccer coach and player for Chicago Red Eleven
- Mick O'Brien (disambiguation), various
- Mike O'Brien (hurler) (born 2011) with Glenroe and Limerick
- Miles O'Brien (disambiguation), various
- Mollie O'Brien (born 1952), a folk singer from West Virginia

=== N ===
- Niall O'Brien (disambiguation), various
- Natasha O'Brien, an Irish woman attacked by an active-duty Irish soldier
- Nick O'Brien (born 1993), Australian rules footballer for Essendon

=== O ===
- Olivia O'Brien (born 1999), American singer and songwriter

=== P ===
- Paddy O'Brien (disambiguation), various
- Parry O'Brien (1932–2007), American shot put champion
- Patricia Salas O'Brien (born 1958), Peruvian sociologist and Minister of Education
- Patrick O'Brien (disambiguation), for people with the forename Patrick or Pat
- Pat O'Brien (disambiguation), various
- Paul O'Brien (disambiguation), various
- Peter O'Brien (disambiguation), various
- Phil O'Brien (disambiguation), various

=== R ===
- Raymond O'Brien (born 1944), American Roman Catholic priest
- Raymond Moulton O'Brien (1905–1977), British-born American businessman
- Richard O'Brien (disambiguation), various
- Riley O'Brien (born 1995), American baseball pitcher
- Robert O'Brien (disambiguation), various
- Ron O'Brien (disambiguation), various
- Roy O'Brien (born 1974), Irish football player

=== S ===
- Saylor O'Brien (born 2003), American para-alpine skier
- Scott O'Brien (born 1957), American football player, coach and scout
- Sean O'Brien (disambiguation)
- Sean Patrick O'Brien (1988–2023), American professional wrestling referee
- Shane O'Brien (disambiguation), various
- Shannon O'Brien (disambiguation), various
- Sicele O'Brien (1887–1931), Irish woman aviation pioneer
- Simon O'Brien (disambiguation), various
- Soledad O'Brien (born 1966), American woman television journalist
- Stephen O'Brien (born 1957), UK conservative politician for Eddisbury
- Stuart O'Brien (1906–2004), American film editor
- Stuart O'Brien (stage) (1833–1883), Australian actor

=== T ===
- Terence O'Brien (disambiguation), various
- Thomas O'Brien (disambiguation), various
- Tim O'Brien (disambiguation), various
- Timothy O'Brien (theatre designer) (1929–2022), British theatre designer
- Timothy O'Brien (endocrinologist), Irish professor
- Timothy L. O'Brien (born 1961), American journalist
- Tina O'Brien (born 1983), English actress
- Tom O'Brien (actor) (b. 1965), American film actor
- Tom O'Brien (American football) (b. 1948), coach at North Carolina State University
- Tom O'Brien (outfielder) (1873–1901), baseball outfielder
- Tom O'Brien (second baseman) (1860–1921), 19th-century baseball player
- Tom O'Brien (trade unionist) (1900–1970), British trade unionist and Member of Parliament
- Tommy O'Brien (baseball) (1918–1978), baseball outfielder

=== U ===
- Una O'Brien, British civil servant

=== V ===
- Vincent O'Brien (disambiguation), various
- Virginia O'Brien (1919–2001), American actress and comic, "Frozen Face" singer

=== W ===
- Walter O'Brien (born 1975), Irish businessman and computer specialist
- Walter A. O'Brien (1914–1998), American Progressive Party politician
- William O'Brien (disambiguation), various
- Willis H. O'Brien (1886–1962), American motion picture special effects pioneer

=== Z ===
- Zach O'Brien (born 1992), professional ice hockey player

== Irish Gaelic surname ==
- Aoife Ní Bhriain, Irish violinist
- Doireann Ní Bhriain (born 1952), Irish radio producer
- Eibhlín Ní Bhriain (1925–1986), Irish journalist
- Dara Ó Briain (born 1972), Irish comedian and presenter
- Donnchadh Ó Briain (1897–1981), Irish politician
- Liam Ó Briain (1888–1974), Irish linguist
- Niamh Uí Bhriain (born 1970), Irish lobbyist and campaigner

== As first or middle names ==
- O'Brien Alston (b. 1965), American former football linebacker
- O'Brien Schofield (b. 1987), American former football linebacker
- O'Brien Smith (c. 1756–1811), Irish-American political figure

== Fictional characters ==
- O'Brien, a character in George Orwell's novel Nineteen Eighty-Four
- Lady Cassandra O'Brien, a fictional character, Doctor Who antagonist
- Chloe O'Brian, a fictional character played by actress Mary Lynn Rajskub on the US television series 24
- Graham O'Brien, a companion of the Thirteenth Doctor in the BBC series Doctor Who
- Keiko O'Brien, a fictional character, wife of Miles O'Brien in Star Trek: The Next Generation and Deep Space Nine
- Miles O'Brien, a fictional character in Star Trek: The Next Generation and Deep Space Nine
- Sarah O'Brien, a fictional character on the ITV series Downton Abbey

== See also ==
- O'Brien dynasty, the royal dynasty that ruled Thomond
