= Daniel O'Brien =

Daniel or Dan O'Brien may refer to:

== Politicians and nobles ==
- Daniel O'Brien, 1st Viscount Clare (1577–1663), MP for County Clare, younger son of Connor O'Brien, 3rd Earl of Thomond
- Daniel O'Brien, 3rd Viscount Clare (fl. 1670–1691), son of Connor O'Brien, 2nd Viscount Clare
- Daniel O'Brien, 4th Viscount Clare (died 1693), son of Daniel O'Brien, 3rd Viscount Clare
- Daniel O'Brien (Jacobite) (1683–1759), Irish Jacobite soldier and diplomat
- Daniel Pitt O'Brien (1900–1957), Secretary of State of West Virginia

== Sportspeople ==
=== Athletes ===
- Dan O'Brien (born 1966), American decathlete
- Dan O'Brien (footballer) (1884–1917), Australian rules football player
- Dan O'Brien (pitcher) (born 1954), American baseball player
- Dan O'Brien (soccer) (born 1986), American soccer player
- Danny O'Brien (gridiron football) (born 1990), American college football quarterback

=== Coaches / executives ===
- Dan O'Brien (American football) (born 1963), American college football coach and administrator
- Dan O'Brien (baseball coach) (born 1971), American college baseball coach
- Dan O'Brien Sr. (1929–2017), American baseball executive, general manager of Rangers, Mariners, Angels
- Dan O'Brien (baseball executive) (born 1953 or 1954), American former baseball executive, general manager of Reds; son of Dan O'Brien Sr.

== Writers / journalists ==
- Daniel O'Brien (comedian) (born 1986), American humorist, writer and comedian
- Dan O'Brien (author) (born 1947), American author and rancher
- Dan O'Brien (playwright) (born 1974), American playwright
- Dan O'Brien (sports journalist), American sports journalist, author and screenwriter
- Danny O'Brien (journalist) (born 1969), British technology journalist

== See also ==
- Danny O'Brien (disambiguation)
- Danielle O'Brien (born 1990), Australian ice dancer
