= Brayan =

- Gender: Masculine
- Language: Spanish

Origin
- Meaning: Spanish spelling variant of Brian

Brayan is a Spanish language spelling variant of the masculine given name Brian. Brayan or Brian and other names with English origins were used by parents from lower economic classes with the hope that their children would become economically successful. The name has negative stereotypical connotations in Colombia and has the image of a “reckless, low-income delinquent.”

Men named Brayan objected after Colombian president Gustavo Petro made disparaging remarks during a cabinet meeting in 2025. In response, two men named Brayan filed defamation lawsuits against Petro. Social media influencer Brayan Mantilla satirized Petro's remarks by calling for a National Brayan Day and founded the Colombian Brayan Association. The Colombian branch of Burger King offered special deals for customers named Brayan.

Notable people with this name include:

== Association football (soccer) ==
- Brayan Angulo (footballer, born 1989), Colombian footballer
- Brayan Angulo (footballer, born 1993), Colombian footballer
- Brayan Beckeles (born 1985), Honduran footballer
- Brayan Ceballos (born 2001), Colombian footballer
- Brayan Cortés (born 1995), Chilean footballer
- Brayan García (born 1993), Honduran footballer
- Brayan Garnica (born 1996), Mexican footballer
- Brayan Gómez (born 2000), Colombian footballer
- Brayan Gil (born 2001), Colombian footballer
- Brayan Guevara (born 1998), Peruvian footballer
- Brayan Hurtado (born 1999), Venezuelan footballer
- Brayan López (footballer, born 1987), Colombian footballer
- Brayan López (footballer, born 1990), Costa Rican-born footballer for Nicaragua
- Brayan Lucumí (born 1994), Colombian footballer
- Brayan Martínez (born 1990), Mexican footballer
- Brayan Moreno (born 1998), Colombian footballer
- Brayan Moya (born 1993), Honduran footballer
- Brayan Palmezano (born 2000), Venezuelan footballer
- Brayan Perea (born 1993), Colombian footballer
- Brayan Ramírez (footballer) (born 1994), Honduran footballer
- Brayan Reyes (born 1991), Honduran footballer
- Brayan Riascos (born 1994), Colombian footballer
- Brayan Rojas (born 1997), Costa Rican footballer
- Brayan Rovira (born 1996), Colombian footballer
- Brayan de la Torre (born 1991), Ecuadorian footballer
- Brayan Torres (born 1998), Colombian footballer
- Brayan Véjar (born 1995), Chilean footballer
- Brayan Velásquez (born 1996), Honduran footballer
- Brayan Vera (born 1999), Colombian footballer
- Brayan Villalobos (born 1998), Mexican footballer

== Baseball ==
- Brayan Bello (born 1999), Dominican baseball pitcher
- Brayan Peña (born 1982), Cuban-American baseball catcher
- Brayan Rocchio (born 2001), Venezuelan baseball infielder
- Brayan Villarreal (born 1987), Venezuelan baseball pitcher

== Cycling ==
- Brayan Ramírez (cyclist) (born 1992), Colombian racing cyclist
- Brayan Sánchez (born 1994), Colombian road and track cyclist

== Other sports ==
- Brayan Lopez (athlete) (born 1997), Italian sprinter
- Brayan Rodallegas (born 1997), Colombian weightlifter

== See also ==
- Brayann Pereira (born 2003), French footballer
- Brian
- Brien
- Bryan (given name)
