= O'Bryant =

O'Bryant is a surname. Notable people with the name include:

- Hugh O'Bryant (1813–1883), the first mayor of Portland, Oregon, United States, serving from 1851 to 1852
- Jimmy O'Bryant (1896–1928), American jazz clarinetist, often compared to Johnny Dodds
- John D. O'Bryant (1931–1992), the first African American to be elected to Boston's School Committee in 1977
- Johnny O'Bryant III (born 1993), American professional basketball player for Crvena Zvezda of the Adriatic League and the EuroLeague
- Patrick O'Bryant (born 1986), US-born Central African professional basketball player for the London Lightning of the National Basketball League of Canada

== See also ==
- John D. O'Bryant School of Mathematics and science, formerly known as Boston Technical High School
- O'Bryant Square, in downtown Portland, Oregon, United States
- W.E. O'Bryant Bell Tower, University of Arkansas at Pine Bluff, Arkansas, United States
- Brant (disambiguation)
- Bryan (disambiguation)
- Bryant (disambiguation)
- O'Bryan
- O'Brian
- List of people named O'Brien
