= Dennis O'Brien =

Dennis or Denis O'Brien may refer to:

- Dennis O'Brien (ice hockey) (born 1949), professional ice hockey player in the National Hockey League
- Dennis M. O'Brien (born 1952), former speaker, PA House of Representatives, and member, 167th District
- Denis O'Brien (born 1958), Irish entrepreneur, charman of Digicel
- Denis O'Brien (footballer) (born 1952), Australian footballer for Collingwood
- Denis O'Brien (police officer) (1899–1942), veteran of the Easter Rising and the Irish Republican Army
- Denis O'Brien (politician) (1837–1909), New York state attorney general
- Denis O'Brien (producer) (1941–2021), co-founder of HandMade Films with George Harrison
- Denis Patrick O'Brien (born 1939), English economist
- Denny O'Brien (born 1973), American columnist, journalist and radio commentator
- G. Dennis O'Brien (born 1931), former president of the University of Rochester

== See also ==
- Dennis O'Bryen (1755–1832), Irish dramatist and political pamphleteer
