= O'Brien =

O'Brien may refer to:

== People ==
- O'Brien (surname), an Irish surname
- O'Brien dynasty, a powerful Irish dynasty that ruled Munster and produced several High Kings of Ireland

== Places ==
=== United States ===
- O'Brien, California, an unincorporated community in Shasta County
- O'Brien, Florida, an unincorporated community in Suwannee County
- O'Brien, Oregon, a census-designated place and unincorporated community in Josephine County
- O'Brien, Texas, a city in Haskell County
- O'Brien County, Iowa, a county

=== Other places ===
- O'Brien, Argentina, a town in Buenos Aires Province, Argentina
- O'Briens Hill, Queensland, a locality in the Cassowary Coast Region, Australia
- O'Brien Island, in the South Shetland Islands, Antarctica
- O'Brien Island, Chile, in the Magallanes Region, Chile

== Ships ==
- USS O'Brien, a list of ships with this name
- Capitan O'Brien-class submarine three submarines built for the Chilean Navy in 1928–1929
- Oberon-class submarine (also known as O'Brien-class submarine), Chilean Navy submarine class
  - Chilean submarine O'Brien (S22), an Oberon-class sub

== Other uses ==
- O'Brien (Nineteen Eighty-Four), the main antagonist in George Orwell's novel
- O'Brien (TV series), a British talk show presented by James O'Brien
- United States v. O'Brien, legal case ruled on by the US Supreme Court regarding draft card burning and the First Amendment's guarantee of free speech
- O'Briens Irish Sandwich Bars, a café chain based in Ireland
- O'Brien AutoGlass, the Australian subsidiary of Belron.

== See also ==
- Brien
- O'Brian, a surname (including a list of people with the name)
- O'Bryan (born 1961), American singer-songwriter
- Justice O'Brien (disambiguation)
