= 1978 in Irish television =

The following is a list of events relating to television in Ireland from 1978.

== Events ==
- January – The controversial secondary school drama The Spike goes on air. It was pulled from the schedule following a nude scene in Episode 5 which sparked criticism from Irish conservatives, and has never been retransmitted.
- March – George T. Waters is appointed as Director-General of RTÉ.
- 2 November – Ireland's second television channel, RTÉ 2 goes on air. The opening night features a variety gala performance from the Cork Opera House and the 1968 film Bullitt.
- 6 November – The UK soap Coronation Street is aired for the first time on RTÉ 2. It had previously only been available to those who could receive UTV or HTV Wales.

== Debuts ==
=== RTÉ 1 ===
- January – The Spike (1978)
- 29 April – (Japan) Fables of the Green Forest (1973)
- 11 September – (United States) Hong Kong Phooey (1974–1975)
- 25 October – (United Kingdom) The Clifton House Mystery (1978)
- 24 December – (United States) Christmas Eve on Sesame Street (1978)

=== RTÉ 2 ===
- 2 November – RTÉ News on Two (1978–present)
- 3 November – (United Kingdom) The Upchat Line (1977)
- 3 November – (United Kingdom) Armchair Thriller (1978–1980)
- 3 November – (United Kingdom) The Voyage of Charles Darwin (1978)
- 4 November – (United Kingdom) Rumpole of the Bailey (1975, 1978–1992)
- 4 November – (United Kingdom) Mind Your Language (1977–1979)
- 4 November – (United States) Sha Na Na (1977–1981)
- 4 November – (United Kingdom) Bruce Forsyth's Big Night (1978, 1980)
- 6 November – (United Kingdom) Coronation Street (1960–present)

=== UTV ===
- 13 July – (United Kingdom) Leave it to Charlie

== Changes of network affiliation ==
Shows	Moved from	Moved to
(United States) The Great Grape Ape Show	RTÉ 1	RTÉ 2

== Ongoing television programmes ==
- RTÉ News: Nine O'Clock (1961–present)
- RTÉ News: Six One (1962–present)
- The Late Late Show (1962–present)
- The Riordans (1965–1979)
- Quicksilver (1965–1981)
- Wanderly Wagon (1967–1982)
- Hall's Pictorial Weekly (1971–1980)
- Sports Stadium (1973–1997)
- Trom agus Éadrom (1975–1985)
- The Late Late Toy Show (1975–present)

== Ending this year ==
- Undated – The Spike (1978)

== Births ==
- 5 May – Paul Byrne, broadcast journalist
- 31 October – Ella McSweeney, radio and television producer

== See also ==
- 1978 in Ireland
