= Brien =

Brien is a surname and male given name. Notable people with this name include:

== Surname ==
- Alan Brien (1925–2008), English journalist
- Chris Brien, drummer, percussionist and drum clinician
- Don Brien (born 1959), Canadian sprint canoer
- Doug Brien (born 1970), American football placekicker
- Edward Brien (1811–1902), Archdeacon of Emly
- Francis Brien, pseudonym of Australian writer Hilary Lofting
- James Brien (1848–1907), politician and physician
- Jennifer Brien, American talk radio host
- Jerry Brien, Australian rugby league football player
- John Wesley Brien (1864–1949), Canadian politician and physician
- Jon D. Brien, American politician
- Kathleen Brien, also known as Katy B (born 1989), English singer and songwriter
- Lévis Brien (born 1955), Canadian politician
- Pierre Brien (born 1970), Canadian politician
- Raley Brien, pseudonym of American writer Johnston McCulley
- Robert Brien (born 1944), Australian tennis player
- Rory Brien (born 1991), Australian rugby league football player
- Timothy Brien, defendant in Varnum v. Brien
- Tony Brien (born 1969), Irish football player
- William Roy Brien (1930–1987), English football player
- William W. Brien (born 1957), American orthopedic surgeon

== Given name ==
- Brien Best (born 1996), Barbadian weightlifter
- Brien Cobcroft (1934–2010), Australian equestrian
- Brien Cokayne, 1st Baron Cullen of Ashbourne (1864–1932), British businessman and banker
- Brien Cullen, American football coach
- Brien McIlroy (1939–1995), Scottish football player
- Brien McMahon (1903–1952), American lawyer and politician
- Brien S. Wygle (1924–2020), American pilot
- Brien Taylor (born 1971), American baseball player

== See also ==
- O'Brien (disambiguation)
- Brian
- Bryan (disambiguation)
- Brayan
