= Richard O'Brien (disambiguation) =

Richard O'Brien (born 1942) is an English actor, television presenter, writer and theatre performer.

Richard O'Brien may also refer to:

- Richard O'Brien (American actor) (1917–1983), American film and television actor
- Richard O'Brien (author) (1934–2012), American writer on the subject of toys and toy collecting
- Richard O'Brien (economist) (born 1950), English economist
- Sir Richard O'Brien (industrial relations expert) (1920–2009), British industrial relations expert and British Army officer
- Richard O'Brien (Fox News) (1956–2017), American creative director who worked for Fox News
- Richard Baptist O'Brien (1809–1885), Irish Roman Catholic priest, author and advocate of Irish home rule
- Richard Barry O'Brien (1847–1918), Irish lawyer, historian, journalist and writer
- Richard Henry O'Brien (1758–1824), American privateer during the American Revolution

== See also ==
- Richard O'Brien Three-Decker, an apartment house listed in the United States National Register of Historic Places
- Lucius Richard O'Brien (1832–1899), Canadian artist
