= Brian Lopez =

Brian Lopez may refer to:

- Brian López, Dominican Republic footballer
- Brian Lopez (musician), Mexican-American singer-songwriter

== See also ==
- Brian Lopes, mountain bike racer
- Bryan Lopez, American soccer player
- Brayan López (disambiguation)
