= Edward O'Brien =

Edward, Ed, Eddie or Ted O'Brien may refer to:

- Ed O'Brien (born 1968), guitarist for Radiohead
- Sir Edward O'Brien, 2nd Baronet (1705–1765), Irish politician and baronet
- Edward Dominic O'Brien (1735–1801), Irish law enforcement official and British Army officer
- Sir Edward O'Brien, 4th Baronet (1773–1837), Irish politician and baronet
- Edward O'Brien, 14th Baron Inchiquin (1839–1900), Irish peer
- Edward Joseph Harrington O'Brien (1890–1941), American writer, poet, editor and anthologist
- Edward O'Brien (mural artist) (1910–1975), American artist and muralist
- Edward O'Brien (athlete) (1914–1976), American 400m runner
- Edward O'Brien (Irish republican) (1974–1996), IRA member
- Edward Conor Marshall O'Brien (1880–1952), Irish aristocrat, architect and sailor
- Eddie O'Brien (baseball) (1930–2014), American former Major League Baseball player
- Eddie O'Brien (hurler) (born 1945), Irish hurler
- Eddie O'Brien (footballer) (1883–1934), Australian rules footballer
- Ted O'Brien, Australian politician (born 1974)
- Ted O'Brien (American politician) (born 1957)

== See also ==
- Edward O'Bryen (c. 1753–1808), sometimes O'Brien, Royal Navy admiral
- Edmond O'Brien (1915–1985), American actor and director
