= Tim O'Brien =

Tim or Timothy O'Brien may refer to:

== Arts and entertainment ==
- Tim O'Brien (record producer), American record producer and music industry executive.
- Tim O'Brien (author) (born 1946), American novelist
- Tim O'Brien (illustrator) (born 1964), American artist
- Tim O'Brien (musician) (born 1954), American country and bluegrass singer
- Timothy O'Brien (theatre designer) (1929–2022), British theatre designer

== Sports ==
- Sir Tim O'Brien, 3rd Baronet (1861–1948), Irish-born cricketer
- Tim O'Brien (footballer) (born 1994), Australian rules footballer
- Tim O'Brien (rugby union), head coach of St. Mary's Gaels rugby

== Other ==
- Sir Timothy O'Brien, 1st Baronet (1787–1862), Irish politician and merchant
- Tim O'Brien (physicist) (born 1963), astrophysicist at the University of Manchester
- Tim O'Brien (Connecticut politician) (born 1968), legislator in the Connecticut House of Representatives
- Tim O'Brien (Indiana politician), member of the Indiana House of Representatives
- Timothy O'Brien (endocrinologist), Irish professor
- Timothy L. O'Brien (born 1961), American journalist

== See also ==
- Timothy (given name)
- O'Brien (disambiguation)
