= Gerard O'Brien =

Gerard O'Brien or Ger O'Brien may refer to:

- Ger O'Brien (born 1984), former Irish footballer
- Gerard O'Brien (cricketer) (born 1942), former Irish cricketer
- Gerard O'Brien (judge) (born 1964), Irish judge
- Gray O'Brien (born Gerard O'Brien, 1968), Scottish actor
