= Joe O'Brien =

Joe O'Brien may refer to:

- Joe O'Brien (American football) (born 1972), American football player and coach
- Joe O'Brien (basketball) (born 1955), American basketball coach
- Joe O'Brien (cyclist) (fl. 1959–1960), Irish cyclist
- Joe O'Brien (19th-century footballer), played for Manchester City and Walsall Town Swifts, see List of Manchester City F.C. players (1–24 appearances)
- Joe O'Brien (footballer) (1875–?), Scottish footballer
- Joe O'Brien (harness racing) (1917–1984), American driver, trainer and owner
- Joe O'Brien (politician), Irish Green Party politician and TD in the 32nd Dáil

== See also ==
- Joe O'Brien Field, Elizabethton, Tennessee
- Joseph O'Brien (disambiguation)
