= Eileen O'Brien =

Eileen O'Brien may refer to:

- Eileen O'Brien (actress), English actress
- Eibhlín Ní Bhriain (1925–1986), also published as Eileen Mary O'Brien, Irish journalist
- Eileen O'Brien (baseball) (1922–2015), played in the All-American Girls Professional Baseball League in 1946
- Eileen Quiring O'Brien (born 1948), American politician in Washington, and in Oregon
- Eileen O'Brien, musician, daughter of accordionist Paddy O'Brien

== See also ==
- Aileen O'Brien (1913–2000), American writer, journalist, and political activist
