= George O'Brien =

George O'Brien may refer to:

- George O'Brien (actor) (1899–1985), American film actor
- George O'Brien (baseball) (1889–1966), American baseball player
- George O'Brien (cricketer) (born 1984), Bermudian cricketer
- George O'Brien (cyclist) (born 1935), British cyclist
- George O'Brien (footballer, born 1935) (1935–2020), Scottish football player for Dunfermline Athletic, Leeds United and Southampton
- George O'Brien (1900s footballer), English football player for Manchester United
- George O'Brien (Irish politician) (1892–1973), Irish politician, economist and academic
- George O'Brien (painter) (1821–1888), New Zealand painter
- George O'Brien (writer) (born 1945), Irish academic and writer of short fiction and memoir
- George D. O'Brien (1900–1957), U.S. Representative from Michigan
- G. Dennis O'Brien (born 1931), former president of the University of Rochester
- George H. O'Brien Jr. (1926–2005), Korean War Medal of Honor recipient
- George M. O'Brien (1917–1986), U.S. Representative from Illinois
- George Thomas Michael O'Brien (1844–1906), governor of Fiji, governor of Hong Kong, High Commissioner for the Western Pacific
- George O'Brien, a fictional politician in the Kingston Trio song "M.T.A."
