= Kate O'Brien =

Kate O'Brien may refer to:

- Kate O'Brien (novelist) (1897–1974), Irish novelist and playwright
- Kate O'Brien (cyclist) (born 1988), Canadian track cyclist and bobsledder
- Kate Cruise O'Brien (1948–1998), Irish writer
- Kate O'Brien (The Drew Carey Show), a character from The Drew Carey Show

== See also ==
- Catherine O'Brien (disambiguation)
- Cathy O'Brien (disambiguation)
- Kate O'Brian, founder of O'Media Strategies
- Katie O'Brien (born 1986), British professional tennis player
- Katy O'Brien (Fair City character), from the Irish television series Fair City
