= David O'Brien =

Dave, Davey or David O'Brien may refer to:

== Sportsmen ==
- Davey O'Brien (1917–1977), American football quarterback
- Dave O'Brien (athletic director) (1956–2014), American collegiate professor at Long Beach, Temple and Northeastern
- David O'Brien (racehorse trainer), Irish racehorse trainer during 1970s and 1980s
- Dave O'Brien (sportscaster) (born 1963), American sportscaster
- David O'Brien (sailor) (born 1965), Irish yacht racer in 2000 Summer Olympics
- David O'Brien (swimmer) (born 1983), English freestyle in 2004 Summer Olympics
- David O'Brien (footballer) (born 1984), Scottish left-sided midfielder
- Dave O'Brien (American football) (born 1941), American football player

== Others ==
- Dave O'Brien (actor) (1912–1969), American film and TV performer, director and writer
- David Wright O'Brien (1918–1944), American fantasy and science fiction writer
- David O'Brien (actor) (1937–1989), American performer in daytime dramas
- David P. O'Brien (born 1941), Canadian business executive since 1980s
- David O'Brien (politician) (born 1970), Australian politician from Victoria

David O'Brien (Politician)
