= Connor O'Brien =

Connor O'Brien may refer to:

- Connor O'Brien, King of Thomond (died 1540)
- Connor O'Brien, 3rd Earl of Thomond (1534?–1581)
- Connor O'Brien, 2nd Viscount Clare (1605–1670)
- Connor O'Brien (alpine skier) (born 1961), Canadian alpine skier
- Connor O'Brien (footballer) (born 2004), English footballer

== See also ==
- Con O'Brien (disambiguation)
- Conor O'Brien (disambiguation)
- Conor O'Brian (born 1980), American wrestler
