= Cathy O'Brien =

Cathy O'Brien or Kathy O'Brien is the name of

- Cathy O'Brien (conspiracy theorist) (born 1957), American conspiracy theorist
- Cathy O'Brien (runner) (born 1967), American marathon runner

== See also ==
- Kate O'Brien (disambiguation)
- Catherine O'Brien (disambiguation)
