= Catherine O'Brien =

Catherine (or variants) O'Brien may refer to:

- Catherine Amelia O'Brien (1881–1963), Irish stained glass artist
- Catherine O'Brien (film scholar), British film scholar
- Catherine O'Brien (Neighbours)
- Katherine O'Brien, physician and scientist in the field of pneumococcal disease
- Katharine O'Brien, film director

== See also ==
- Kitty O'Brien (disambiguation)
- Cathy O'Brien (disambiguation)
- Kate O'Brien (disambiguation)
