= Patrick O'Brien =

Pat or Patrick O'Brien may refer to:

== Politics ==
- Patrick O'Brien (Australian politician) (1810–1882), politician in Victoria, Australia
- Patrick Joseph O'Brien (1835–1911), Member of Parliament for North Tipperary, 1885–1906
- Pat O'Brien (Irish politician) (c. 1847–1917), Irish Nationalist MP in the United Kingdom Parliament
- Sir Patrick O'Brien, 2nd Baronet (1823–1895), Irish politician
- Pat O'Brien (Irish politician) (Patrick O'Brien, c. 1847–1917), Irish Nationalist MP in the United Kingdom Parliament
- Patrick Joseph O'Brien, (1835–1911) , Irish Nationalist MP in the United Kingdom Parliament
- Pat O'Brien (Canadian politician) (born 1948), member of the Canadian House of Commons

== Arts and entertainment ==
- Pat O'Brien (radio and television personality) (born 1948), American sports commentator and television host

=== Actors ===
- Patrick Thomas O'Brien (born 1951), American actor
- Pat O'Brien (actor) (1899–1983), American film actor

=== Authors ===
- Patrick O'Brian (1914–2000), English novelist and translator
- Patrick O'Brien (artist) (born 1960), illustrator and author of children's books

=== Musicians ===
- Patrick O'Brien (musician) (1947–2014), American musician and lutenist
- Pat O'Brien (guitarist) (born 1965), American guitarist for Cannibal Corpse

== Sports ==
- Patrick O'Brien (footballer, born 1875) (1875–1951), Scottish footballer
- Patrick O'Brien (footballer, born 1884) (1884–?), Scottish footballer and surgeon
- Maynard O'Brien (1907–1990), American football coach nicknamed Pat
- Pat O'Brien (racing driver) (born 1965), Hall of Fame modified racing driver
- Pat O'Brien (rugby union) (born 1989), South African rugby union player

== Other ==
- Patrick Cotter O'Brien (1760–1806), the tallest person alive in his lifetime
- Patrick K. O'Brien (born 1932), British academic and historian
- Patrick O'Brien (political scientist) (1937–1998), politics professor, University of Western Australia
- Benson Harrison "Pat" O'Brien (1894–1983) of Pat O'Brien's Bar, US cocktail maker

== See also ==
- Paddy O'Brien (disambiguation)
