= Eugene O'Brien =

Eugene O'Brien may refer to:

- Eugene O'Brien (actor) (1880–1966), American silent film and stage actor
- Eugene O'Brien (composer) (born 1945), American composer, and professor
- Eugene O'Brien (engineer) Irish bridge engineer and academic
- Eugene O'Brien (playwright), Irish playwright, screenwriter and actor
- Eugene O'Brien (politician) (1897–1980), Irish politician
- Eugene O'Brien (racing driver) (born 1960), British auto racing driver and coach
- Eugene W. O'Brien (1897–1970s), American engineer, editor, and publisher
