= Kitty O'Brien =

Kitty O'Brien may refer to:

- Kitty O'Brien (stained glass artist) (1881–1963), Irish stained glass artist
- Kitty O'Brien (engineer) (1916–1993), American electrical engineer
- Kitty Wilmer O'Brien (1910–1982), Irish painter

== See also ==
- Kitt O'Brien (born 1990), American football player
- Catherine O'Brien (disambiguation)
