= Lochie O'Brien =

Australian rules footballer

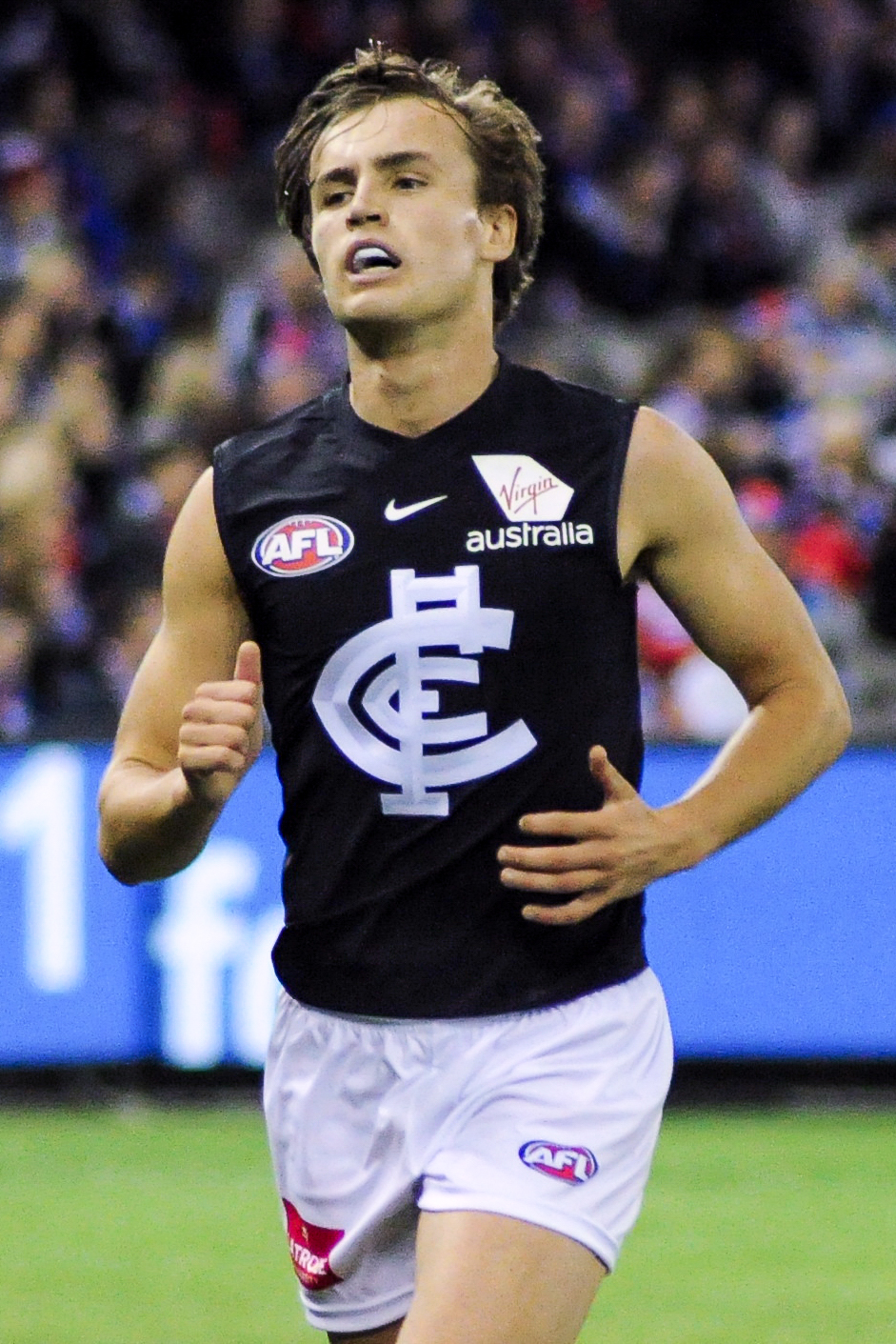
- O'Brien playing for Carlton in April 2018

Personal information
- Born: 18 September 1999 (age 27)
- Original team: Bendigo Pioneers (TAC Cup)/Geelong Grammar School (APS)/ South Mildura
- Draft: No. 10, 2017 national draft
- Debut: Round 4, 2018, Carlton vs. North Melbourne, at Blundstone Arena
- Height: 185 cm (6 ft 1 in)
- Weight: 82 kg (181 lb)
- Position: Midfielder

Playing career
Years	Club	Games (Goals)
2018–2023	Carlton	66 (16)
2024–2026	Wang Rovers	61 (24)

Career highlights
- O&MFNL - Premiership: 2024, 2025, 2026; O&MFNL - Morris Medal: 2025

Lochie O'Brien (born 18 September 1999) is a former professional Australian rules footballer who played for the Carlton Football Club in the Australian Football League (AFL).

== Early life and junior career ==
Lochie grew up in rural Victoria and played junior football for the South Mildura Football Club. Growing up a Collingwood fan, his grandfather Denis played one senior game for Collingwood in 1971. Lochie had a promising athletics career growing up, breaking regional records in the 400 and 1500m categories and eventually breaking the state's school record with a time of 51.06 seconds. His impressive sporting background gave him the opportunity to attend Geelong Grammar School. It was not long before he was picked up by the Bendigo Pioneers of the TAC Cup.

== AFL career ==
O'Brien was drafted by Carlton with its second selection (No. 10 overall) in the 2017 national draft. He made his debut in Round 4, 2018 against North Melbourne at Blundstone Arena, and the following week was given a contract extension to the end of 2021.

O'Brien played regular senior football in his first two seasons, appearing in 35 of 44 matches, before falling out of favour and playing only six across in 2020 and 2021. He was demoted from the club's senior list to its rookie list for the 2022 season. At the end of 2023 AFL season he was delisted from the Carlton Football Club.

O'Brien was a member of Wangaratta Rovers' 2024, 2025 and 2026 Ovens & Murray Football League premiership teams and won the league's best and fairest award, the Morris Medal in 2025.

== Statistics ==
Statistics are correct to the end of round 23, 2022.

Legend
G	Goals	K	Kicks	D	Disposals	T	Tackles
B	Behinds	H	Handballs	M	Marks

Season	Team	No.	Games	Totals							Averages (per game)						
Season	Team	No.	Games	G	B	K	H	D	M	T	G	B	K	H	D	M	T
2018	Carlton	4	18	2	1	168	83	251	79	26	0.1	0.1	9.3	4.6	13.9	4.4	1.4
2019	Carlton	4	14	6	4	130	45	175	64	16	0.4	0.1	9.3	3.2	12.5	4.6	1.1
2020	Carlton	4	1	1	0	5	2	7	2	2	1.0	0.0	5.0	2.0	7.0	2.0	1.0
2021	Carlton	4	5	1	3	49	31	80	20	9	0.2	0.6	9.8	6.2	16.0	4.0	1.8
2022	Carlton	4	19	5	9	238	99	337	98	27	0.4	0.5	12.5	5.2	17.7	5.1	1.4
Career			60	16	17	619	267	886	279	83	0.3	0.3	10.3	4.4	14.8	4.6	1.4
