= Alexander Owens =

Irish barrister, High Court judge since 2019

The Hon. Mr. Justice Alexander Owens

Judge of the High Court
- Incumbent
- Assumed office 4 February 2019
- Nominated by: Government of Ireland
- Appointed by: Michael D. Higgins

Personal details
- Education: Trinity College Dublin; King's Inns

Alexander Owens is an Irish judge who has served as a Judge of the High Court since February 2019. He formerly worked as a barrister with an expertise in criminal law.

== Education ==
Owens attended Trinity College Dublin where he obtained a BA. He studied to become a barrister at the King's Inns.

== Legal career ==
He was called to the Bar in 1980 and became a senior counsel in 2000. His practice focused on criminal law, and the law of conveyancing, local government and chancery law. He also appeared in cases involving company law and personal injuries.

He frequently appeared on behalf of the Director of Public Prosecutions. He prosecuted criminal trials of a serious nature involving sexual offences, kidnapping, murder, waste offences, and terrorism offences. He appeared for the Minister for Justice in an action relating to the publication of the Cloyne Report.

He was appointed Deputy Chairman of the Panel of Enquiry of the University of Dublin in 2004 and subsequently became the chair.

== Judicial career ==
Owens was appointed a judge of the High Court in February 2019. He has presided over cases involving extradition, sexual offences, murder, manslaughter, false imprisonment, and the proceeds of crime. Outside of criminal law he has heard cases involving child law, property, and personal injury law.

He became a judge of the Special Criminal Court in July 2019, replacing Aileen Donnelly. He has acted as the presiding judge in that court.

Notable cases he has presided over include the trial of Circuit Court judge Gerard O'Brien in December 2023, and the trial of Conor McGregor in November 2024.
