= Jemma Redmond =

Irish biotechnology pioneer

- Born: 16 March 1978; Tallaght, Ireland
- Died: 16 August 2016 (aged 38)
- Occupations: Biotechnologist, innovator

Jemma Redmond (16 March 1978 – 16 August 2016) was an Irish biotechnology pioneer and innovator. She was a co-founder of 3D bio-printing firm Ourobotics, developers of the first-ever ten-material bio-printer. Redmond designed a way of keeping living cells alive while printed using 3D printers, making her a leading figure in Irish science and technology.

== Early life ==
Born in Tallaght, South Dublin, Redmond studied electronic engineering before earning her undergraduate degree in applied physics at Robert Gordon University in Aberdeen in 2002. She later returned to university, completing a master's degree in nano-bioscience at University College Dublin in 2012, along with qualifications in project management and electronic engineering. Her interest in nano-bioscience was sparked by an intersex condition that made her infertile. She started bioprinting by building her own devices in her kitchen.

== Career ==
A serial entrepreneur, Redmond created a company manufacturing vending machines in 2008, before co-founding Ourobotics in January 2015, with Alanna Kelly from Galway, Ireland, and backing from SOSV. Kelly resigned as director in July 2015. Tony Herbert, entrepreneur and owner of technical optics company Irish Precision Optics, from Cork became a director of Ourobotics in August 2015 and the company moved to the optics company premises in Cork City. Redmond designed and marketed two bio-printers including, in 2016, a printer capable of printing human tissue, and at a much lower cost than previous bio-printers. Redmond's first device printed an extended finger, described by Pádraig Belton as "a gentle reply to those who had called printing organs of such complexity impossible."

In January 2016, the company won first prize in a prestigious international competition, Silicon Valley Open Doors Europe. The company was also selected as part of a start-up adoption program by Google.

== Death ==
Redmond died unexpectedly in August 2016. Her mother described it as a "tragic accident". She was described as a polymath, an inspiration and great friend.
