= Terence O'Brien =

Terence or Terrence O'Brien may refer to:

- Terence O'Brien (bishop) (1600–1651), Irish Roman Catholic bishop of Emly
- Terence O'Brien (British Army officer, died 1865), British Army officer and acting governor of Ceylon
- Sir Terence O'Brien (colonial administrator) (1830–1904), British Army officer and governor of Newfoundland, 1889–1895, son of the above
- Terence O'Brien (actor) (1887–1970), Irish-born British actor
- Terence O'Brien (rower) (1906–1982), English Olympic rower
- Terence O'Brien (British diplomat) (1921–2006), British ambassador to Nepal, 1970–1974, Burma, 1974–1978, and Indonesia, 1978–1981
- Terence O'Brien (New Zealand diplomat) (1936–2022), New Zealand ambassador to the United Nations, 1980–1983, 1990–1993, and the European Community, 1983–1986
- Terrence L. O'Brien (born 1943), United States federal judge
- Terrence O'Brien (director) (born 1953), American founder and director of the Hudson Valley Shakespeare Festival
