= Press Association =

National news agency of the UK and Ireland

- Logo since October 2026
- Formerly: PA Media
- Type: Press agency
- Founded: 1868; 158 years ago in United Kingdom
- Headquarters: North Wharf Road; London, W2; United Kingdom
- Number of locations: 8 (2026)
- Parent: The PA
- Website: pressassociation.com

Press Association (formerly PA Media) is a multimedia news agency. It is part of The PA, a private company with 20 shareholders, most of whom are national and regional newspaper publishers. The biggest shareholders include the Daily Mail and General Trust, News UK, and Informa.

The PA has expertise in news, sport, content and communications. At the heart of the organisation is the Press Association, the national news agency for the UK and Ireland. The PA’s wider portfolio of businesses includes stock content library Alamy, sport data business Podium and PR and communications division Hydrogen.

The Press Association delivers breaking news, sports coverage, court reporting, photos, video and data journalism to audiences across print, digital and broadcast. In recent years, it has moved beyond the news agenda to launch puzzles, lifestyle, human interest, listings and entertainment content, metadata and media training.

== History ==
Founded in 1868 by a group of provincial newspaper proprietors, the Press Association provides a London-based service of news-collecting and reporting from around the United Kingdom. The news agency's founders sought to produce a more accurate and reliable alternative to the monopoly service of the telegraph companies.

In January 1870 the agency moved from temporary offices into new headquarters at 7 Wine Office Court, off Fleet Street. The agency's first Editor-in-Chief was Arthur Cranfield, appointed in 1926. The PA then moved to 85 Fleet Street in the 1930s.

In 1995, PA moved from Fleet Street to Vauxhall Bridge Road, enabling the company to rapidly expand its output particularly in the sports and new media divisions.

The Press Association launched the Ananova news website in 2000. Ananova was then sold to Orange.

In 2005, the company changed its name to PA Group.

In December 2013, PA Group sold its weather business MeteoGroup, Europe's largest private sector weather company, to global growth investment firm General Atlantic.

In February 2015, PA announced the sale of its finance publications divisions, which included TelecomFinance and SatelliteFinance.

In September 2018 it was announced that the news agency was renamed from Press Association to PA Media, and the umbrella company from PA Group Limited to PA Media Group Limited. This coincided with a move from their Vauxhall Bridge Road offices to a new space that would accommodate the move toward digital media.

In 2020-2023, PA Media Group acquired several new businesses, including global content platform Alamy (2020), social media marketing agency Hydrogen (2022), and Asian racing specialist iRace Media (2023).

In 2024, PA Betting Services rebranded as sport data business, Podium.

The editor-in-chief of the news agency is Jack Lefley, who was appointed in 2024 and began the role in 2025. Emily Shelley was appointed CEO of The PA in 2024, becoming the first female to lead the group in its history.

In June 2024, the Central Arbitration Committee forced PA to recognize the National Union of Journalists as the official union representing PA's editorial employees. As of May, the bargaining unit was composed of 274 workers.

In 2026, PA Media reinstated its historic Press Association name, while the news agency’s parent company, PA Media Group, became The PA.

== Other divisions and ventures ==
=== Press Association Academy ===
Press Association Academy, formerly PA Training and PA Media Academy, is Europe's biggest journalism and media training company. It was formed in 2006, when the Press Association acquired Trinity Mirror's training centre in Newcastle upon Tyne. The NCTJ course in Newcastle has been around since 1969.

The business already owned the former Westminster Press-owned Editorial Centre and merged the two businesses to become PA Training.

In 2026, Press Association Academy relocated to a new office in Stratford, London.

== See also ==
- EMPICS
- Media of the United Kingdom
- List of news agencies
