= Brayan López =

Brayan López may refer to:

- Brayan Lopez (athlete) (born 1997), Italian sprinter
- Brayan López (footballer, born 1987), Colombian footballer
- Brayan López (footballer, born 1990), Nicaragua-Costa Rican footballer
