= Michael O'Brien =

Michael or Mike O'Brien may refer to:

== Politicians ==
- Michael O'Brien (Fianna Fáil politician) (1933–2025), Irish councillor and mayor of Clonmel
- Michael O'Brien (Ohio politician) (born 1955), American politician in the state of Ohio
- Michael O'Brien (South Australian politician) (born 1949), Australian Labor Party member of the South Australian House of Assembly, 2002–present
- Micheal O'Brien (Canadian politician), Progressive Conservative Party of Canada candidate for the Canadian House of Commons
- Michael O'Brien (Victorian politician) (born 1971), Liberal Party of Australia member of the Victorian Legislative Assembly, 2006–present
- Michael H. O'Brien (1954–2018), American politician in the commonwealth of Pennsylvania
- Michael J. O'Brien (born 1939), American politician in the state of Iowa
- Michael John O'Brien (1851–1940), Canadian politician, railway builder, industrialist and philanthropist
- Mike O'Brien (British politician) (born 1954), United Kingdom Labour Party politician
- Mike O'Brien (Canadian politician), mayor of Fredericton, New Brunswick
- Mike O'Brien (Seattle politician) (born 1968), American politician
- Michael O'Brien (New Hampshire politician)

== Sports ==
- Michael O'Brien (Australian rules footballer) (born 1980), West Coast Eagles
- Michael O'Brien (fencer) (born 1969), Irish fencer
- Michael O'Brien (hurling manager) (1933–2014), Irish Catholic priest and hurling manager
- Michael O'Brien (Irish sportsman), Irish association footballer, Gaelic footballer and cricketer in the 1920s
- Mike O'Brien (swimmer) (born 1965), American swimmer
- Micheál O'Brien (1923–2015), Irish Gaelic footballer and hurler
- Mike O'Brien (American football) (born 1956), American football player
- Mike O'Brien (hurler) (born 1978), Irish hurler
- Mikey O'Brien (born 1999), Irish hurler

== Others ==
- Michael O'Brien (bishop) (1876–1952), Irish Roman Catholic bishop
- Michael O'Brien (American poet) (1939–2016), American poet
- Michael O'Brien (Canadian author) (born 1948), Canadian author
- Michael O'Brien (game designer), Australian game designer
- Michael O'Brien (historian) (1948–2015), American historian
- Michael O'Brien (unionist) (born 1949 or 1950), American labor union leader
- Michael O'Brien (musician) (born 1964), American musician
- Michael O'Brien (photographer) (born 1950), American photographer
- Michael K. O'Brien, visual effects artist
- Mike O'Brien (actor) (born 1976), American writer and performer on Saturday Night Live
- Mike O'Brien (game developer), co-founder, ArenaNet; game designer and programmer
- Michael O'Brien(accountant), Australian accountant who was a streaker during a Twickenham rugby match during 1974.

== Characters ==
- Guardsman (Michael O'Brien), a fictional character in the Iron Man comics
- Michael O'Brien, a fictional engineer character in the 1940 Christmas film Beyond Tomorrow

== See also ==
- Mick O'Brien (disambiguation)
