= Phil O'Brien =

Phil O'Brien may refer to:

== Sportsmen ==
- Phil O'Brien (footballer) (1930–2020), Australian rules forward
- Phil O'Brien (motorcyclist), Australian racer in 1969 Grand Prix motorcycle racing season, 500cc race
- Phil O'Brien (athlete), English runner in 1983 IAAF World Cross Country Championships – Senior men's race

== Writers ==
- Phil O'Brien, pen name, since 1970s, of Irish dramaturge Philomena Muinzer
- Phil O'Brien, American journalist, 1993–94 president of New York Press Club
- Phil O'Brien, Australian writer, musician and filmmaker who directed 2022 film in Nhulunbuy, Northern Territory

== Others ==
- Phil O'Brien, New Zealand presenter on TVNZ and Radio New Zealand since 1970s
- Phil O'Brien (entrepreneur), British photographer, founder of EMPICS in 1985
