= Miles O'Brien =

Miles O'Brien may refer to:

- Miles O'Brien (journalist) (born 1959), news journalist
- Miles M. O'Brien (1852–1910), banker and former president of the New York City Board of Education
- Miles O'Brien (Star Trek), a fictional character from Star Trek: The Next Generation and Star Trek: Deep Space Nine, played by Colm Meaney
