= Robert O'Brien =

Robert O'Brien may refer to:

== Sportspeople ==
- Robert O'Brien (cricketer) (1869–1922), Australian cricketer
- Robert O'Brien (racing driver) (1908–1987), American racing driver
- Bob O'Brien (basketball) (1927–2008), American basketball player
- Robert O'Brien (canoeist) (born 1933), American sprint canoer
- Bob O'Brien (baseball) (born 1949), baseball player

== Others ==
- Robert J. O'Brien (1858–1948), American real estate developer, politician and philanthropist
- Robert O'Brien (executive) (1907–1997), American businessman
- Robert C. O'Brien (author) (1918–1973), American journalist and children's book author
- Robert O'Brien (1918–2005), film and TV writer, most notably Say One for Me (1959)
- Robert O'Brien (artist) (born 1939), British Hong Kong artist
- Robert O'Brien (RAF officer) (active in 1990s), former US Air Secretary
- Robert C. O'Brien (born 1966), US National Security Advisor
