= Mark O'Brien =

Mark O'Brien may refer to:

- Mark O'Brien (actor) (born 1984), Canadian actor
- Mark O'Brien (cyclist) (born 1987), Australian cyclist
- Mark O'Brien (footballer, born 1984), Irish footballer, plays for Shelbourne F.C.
- Mark O'Brien (footballer, born 1992), Irish footballer
- Mark O'Brien (poet) (1949–1999), American poet and disability rights advocate
- Mark O'Brien (hurler), Irish hurler
- Mark O'Brien (politician), member of the Kentucky House of Representatives
