= The Spike (TV series) =

- Genre: Drama
- Country of origin: Ireland
- Original language: English
- No. of seasons: 1
- No. of episodes: 10 (of which 5 were aired)

Original release
- Network: Raidió Teilifís Éireann (RTÉ)

The Spike is a controversial Irish drama television series, broadcast by Raidió Teilifís Éireann (RTÉ) in 1978. The ten-part series was set in a secondary school. The script was written by Patrick Gilligan who was a vocational school teacher.

== Reviews ==
The series was negatively reviewed by critics who took issue with the poor script, bad acting and the clumsy thematic treatment. A review in The Irish Times stated that " this much publicized drama series has turned out to be so bad it must now be taken seriously". Dr Helena Sheehan, a lecturer in social history, wrote in 2002 that

There was little ground for anyone to stand on to defend it. Those who would have been willing to accept a critical perspective on the education system and explicit references to human sexuality were undercut by the clumsiness of the treatment of the issues, the superficiality of the characterisation and the immaturity of the underlying point of view.

== Controversy ==
In episode five, "the briefest glimpse of naked flesh" caused outrage and angry phonecalls to newspapers. The show's producer defended the nude streak as an intent "to examine the attitude of pupils and staff to nudity". The ensuing fuss led to one of the actors requiring medical treatment after he was, as the Evening Press elegantly phrased it, "thumped by a fat elderly lady". The episode sparked debate in Dáil Éireann and was condemned by the Taoiseach Jack Lynch, despite him having never seen the programme. On the day that the sixth episode was due to air with a story of a schoolboy bomber, it was axed. The remaining episodes remain locked away and have neither never been broadcast on RTÉ nor viewed by members of the general public. The Spike was later featured on RTÉ's scandal series, Scannal, with the Irish Independent naming it as one of their "Top 10 Worst Irish TV Programmes".
