= Jack O'Brian =

American journalist

- Born: John Dennis Patrick O'Brian; August 16, 1914; Buffalo, New York
- Died: November 5, 2000 (aged 86); New York, New York
- Citizenship: United States
- Occupations: Journalist for Buffalo Courier-Express, Associated Press, New York Journal American, WOR

John Dennis Patrick O'Brian (August 16, 1914 – November 5, 2000) was an American entertainment journalist best known for his longtime role as a television critic for New York Journal American.

== Career ==
A supporter of Senator Joseph McCarthy, O'Brian wrote a series of red-baiting attacks on CBS News and WCBS TV reporter Don Hollenbeck, accusing him of having Communist sympathies. These attacks were a major factor in Hollenbeck's eventual suicide in 1954, and are referenced in the 1986 film Murrow as well as in the 2005 film Good Night, and Good Luck and its Broadway adaptation.

After the death in November 1965 of Dorothy Kilgallen, his colleague at the Journal American, O'Brian took over her Voice of Broadway column at the paper.

== Personal life and death ==
O'Brian was married to Yvonne Johnston, who died in 1996. They had two daughters, Bridget and Kate O'Brian, who was president of Al Jazeera America.
