= Vincent O'Brien (disambiguation) =

Vincent O'Brien (1917–2009) was an Irish race horse trainer.

Vincent O'Brien may also refer to:

- Vincent O'Brien (composer) (1871–1948), Irish organist, music teacher and composer
- Vincent J. O'Brien (1919-2010), American character actor
- "Vincent O'Brien", a song by M. Ward from his 2003 album Transfiguration of Vincent
- Vincent O'Brian, a minor fictional character in American TV series 24
