= Derek O'Brien =

Derek O'Brien may refer to:

- Derek O'Brien (drummer) (born 1963), American drummer for punk bands Social Distortion, D.I. and The Adolescents
- Derek O'Brien (footballer, born 1957), Irish player for Boston Utd, Bohemians, Dundalk, Shamrock Rovers, Athlone Town, Longford Town & Home Farm
- Derek O'Brien (footballer, born 1979), Irish footballer
- Derek O'Brien (politician) (born 1961), Indian politician, author, television personality, public speaker and quiz show host

== See also ==
- Derrick O'Brien (1975–2006), executed convicted murderer
