= O'Brian =

O'Brian is an Irish surname and may refer to:

== People named O'Brian ==
=== Forename ===
- O'Brian White (born 1985), Jamaican footballer
- O'Brian Woodbine (born 1988), Jamaican footballer

=== Surname ===
- Conor O'Brian (born 1980), a ring name of American professional wrestler Ryan Parmeter
- Hugh O'Brian (1925–2016), stage name of American actor Hugh Krampe
- Jack O'Brian (1914–2000), columnist and supporter of Joseph McCarthy
- Katy O'Brian (born 1989), American actress
- Michael John O'Brian (1928–2002), Pakistan Air Force air vice-marshal
- Patrick O'Brian (1914–2000), pen name of British novelist and translator Richard Russ
- Peter O'Brian (actor) (born 1956), New Zealand/Indonesian actor
- Peter O'Brian (film producer) (born 1947), Canadian film producer

== Fictional people named O'Brian ==
- Chloe O'Brian, a character in the American TV series 24
- Morris O'Brian, a character in the American TV series 24

== See also ==
- O'Brien (surname), alternate Anglicization of surname (also O'Bryan)
- Dara Ó Briain, Irish comedian and presenter
