= Dave O'Brien (athletic director) =

David P. O'Brien (March 16, 1956 – March 1, 2014) was an American collegiate athletic director at Long Beach State College in Long Beach, California, Temple University in Philadelphia, Pennsylvania, and Northeastern University in Boston, Massachusetts. He was also an associate teaching professor and program director of sports management at Drexel University, an editor of College Sports Business News and managing partner of O'Brien Sports Group.

O'Brien was athletic director at Long Beach State from 1989 to 1996 and oversaw two major moves: cutting the football program in 1991 and building the Walter Pyramid, the basketball arena which opened in 1994.

During O'Brien's tenure at Temple (1996–2002), the Temple Owls' men's basketball team went 135–65 and made it to the NCAA Basketball Tournament in five of six seasons under head coach John Chaney. The team advanced to the Elite Eight in 1999 and 2001. The football team struggled and was voted out of the Big East Conference shortly before O'Brien resigned from Temple in January 2002.

At Northeastern from 2002 to 2007, O'Brien was responsible for hiring current men's basketball coach Bill Coen, women's basketball coach Daynia La-Force, former football coach Rocky Hager and former men's ice hockey coach Greg Cronin. The school announced a move from the America East Conference to the Colonial Athletic Association in 2004. After O'Brien left Northeastern in 2007, the school cut the football team following the 2009 season.

O'Brien was a graduate of Moravian College and Seton Hall Law School.

O'Brien died on March 1, 2014, at the age of 57 at his home in Lower Gwynedd Township, Montgomery County, Pennsylvania, of cancer.
