= Anne O'Brien =

Anne O'Brien may refer to:

- Anne O'Brien, 2nd Countess of Orkney (died 1756), Scottish noblewoman
- Anne O'Brien (athlete) (1911–2007), American track and field athlete
- Anne O'Brien (footballer), Irish footballer
- Anne Philomena O'Brien, Australian historian
- Ann O'Brien (runner), Irish runner
- Ann O'Brien, comic book superheroine

== See also ==
- Anne Rice (Howard Allen Frances O'Brien, 1941–2021), American author
