= Eugene W. O'Brien =

American engineer, writer and publisher

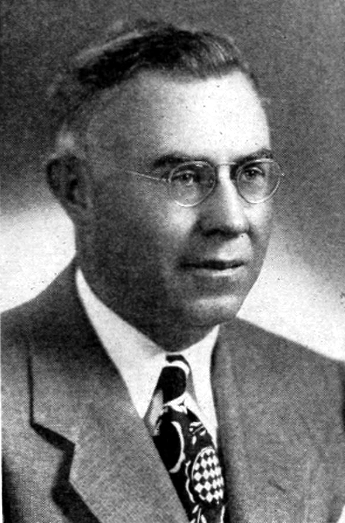
Eugene W. O'Brien

Eugene William O'Brien (June 20, 1897 – 1984) was an American electrical, mechanical and consulting engineer, editor, and publisher, who was 66th president of the American Society of Mechanical Engineers in the year 1947–48.

== Biography ==
=== Youth and education ===
O'Brien was born in 1899 in West Warwick, Rhode Island as son of John Joseph O'Brien and Mary (Flynn) O'Brien. His father was a blacksmith and wheelwright.

After attending Warwick High School, O'Brien obtained his BSc in electrical engineering from Brown University in 1919, and in 1921 his M.Sc.in mechanical engineering. In 1925 he obtained his PhD in mechanical engineering from Yale University.

=== Career and acknowledgement ===
O'Brien had started his career as faculty member at Brown University from 1918 to 1922, and at Yale University from 1922 to 1925. After his graduation from Yale in 1925 he started a private practice as consulting engineer, and was connected with the structural engineering firm Jenks & Ballou at Providence.

In 1927 O'Brien was appointed editor-in-chief of the Southern Power Journal, later Southern Power and Industry, and moved up to managing director of the journal in 1933. In 1936 he was appointed vice president and director of W.R.C. Smith Publishing Company in Atlanta.

In 1946 O'Brien had been elected president of the American Society of Mechanical Engineers (ASME) for the year 1947–48. He had started as ASME member in 1921, and had served as manager from 1931 to 1934, and as vice president from 1934 to 1936. In 1975 he was elected Honorary Member of the ASME. In 1958 O'Brien was named as "Brown's Ambassador-at-Large" by Brown University, and awarded the Brown Bear Award by the Brown Alumni Association for "outstanding personal service over a period of years."
