= Paddy O'Brien =

Paddy O'Brien may refer to:

== Sports ==
- Paddy O'Brien (Australian rules footballer) (1893–1964)
- Paddy O'Brien (Gaelic footballer) (1925–2016), inter-county Irish Gaelic footballer
- Paddy O'Brien (rugby union) (born 1959), New Zealand international rugby union referee
- Paddy O'Brien (Tipperary hurler) (born 1979), Irish left corner-forward
- Paddy O'Brien (Éire Óg hurler), member of the 1947 Kilkenny Hurling Team
- Paddy O'Brien (Laois hurler), played in the 1949 All-Ireland Senior Hurling Championship final
- Paddy O'Brien (fl. 1949), Tipperary hurler

== Other people ==
- Paddy O'Brien (accordionist) (1922–1991), Irish button accordion player and composer
- Paddy O'Brien (musician and author) (born 1945), Irish-American accordionist, born County Offaly
- Paddy O'Brien (singer) (born 1954), Irish country singer, born County Waterford
- Paddy O'Brien, minion of the Austin Powers character Dr. Evil
- Paddy (Patrick) O'Brien, multiple officers involved in IRA operations:
  - see Battle of Dublin
  - see Clonbanin Ambush
  - see Kilmichael Ambush

== See also ==
- Patrick O'Brien (disambiguation)
