= Eddie O'Brien (footballer) =

Australian rules footballer

Personal information
- Full name: Edmund Vincent O'Brien
- Born: 4 May 1883; Bendigo, Victoria
- Died: 30 January 1934 (aged 50); Brisbane, Queensland

Playing career^{1}
Years	Club	Games (Goals)
1910	St Kilda	2 (0)
- ^{1} Playing statistics correct to the end of 1910.

Edmund Vincent O'Brien (4 May 1883 – 30 January 1934) was an Australian rules footballer who played with St Kilda in the Victorian Football League (VFL).
