= Dennis O'Bryen =

Irish surgeon, dramatist and political pamphleteer

- Born: 1755; Ireland
- Died: 13 August 1832 (aged 76–77)
- Occupations: Dramatist and political pamphleteer

Dennis O'Bryen (1755 – 13 August 1832) was an Irish dramatist and political pamphleteer.

== Biography ==
O'Bryen was born in Ireland in 1755, became a surgeon, but relinquished the practice of his profession and settled in London, where he distinguished himself as a zealous political partisan of Fox, with whom he was on terms of great intimacy. The work which first brought him into notice was an ironical ‘Defence of the Earl of Shelburne from the Reproaches of his numerous Enemies, in a Letter to Sir George Saville, bart., to which is added a Postscript addressed to the Earl of Stair’ relative to his pamphlet on the state of the public debt, London, 1782, 8vo; 2nd ed. 1783. He next wrote ‘A Friend in Need is a Friend indeed,’ a three-act comedy performed at the Haymarket Theatre on 5 July 1783, but not printed. The cast included Palmer, Edwin, Parsons, Baddeley, and Mrs. Inchbald. This play, which in some respects resembled Oliver Goldsmith's ‘The Good-Natur'd Man,’ was acted eight times, but did not meet with a very cordial reception, and it gave rise to a newspaper controversy between the author and George Colman, the manager of the theatre (Baker, Biogr. Dramatica, 1812, i. 545, ii. 252; Genest, vi. 281).

In 1784 he published another ironical work, entitled ‘A Gleam of Comfort to this distracted Empire, demonstrating the Fairness and Reasonableness of National Confidence in the present Ministry’—meaning the ministry of Pitt. About the same time he published two papers, called ‘The Reasoner,’ which subsequently appeared in several compilations, the first being attributed by the compiler to Lord Erskine, and the second to Sheridan. In 1786 he printed ‘A View of the Commercial Treaty with France,’ negotiated by William Eden, afterwards Lord Auckland. This was followed by ‘Lines written at Twickenham,’ 1788, in which year, immediately upon the king's illness, he published anonymously ‘The Prospect before us, being a Series of Papers upon the great Question [i.e. of the regency] which now agitates the Public Mind.’ This was reproduced under the title of ‘The Regency Question,’ with a new preface, in consequence of the discussions caused by the return of his majesty's malady in 1810. In 1796 he published ‘Utrum Horum? The Government or the Country?’ which rapidly passed through three editions.

Upon the change of ministry in 1806 he succeeded to the lucrative sinecure of deputy paymaster-general, and in the same year he was appointed by Fox to the patent office of marshal of the admiralty at the Cape of Good Hope, worth, it was said, 4,000l. per annum. He died at Margate on 13 August 1832. He had resided in London in Craven Street, Strand. His political correspondence was sold by auction a year or two after his death.
