= Denis O'Brien (footballer) =

Australian rules footballer (born 1952)

Personal information
- Full name: Denis O'Brien
- Born: 10 April 1952 (age 74)
- Original team: Greensborough
- Height: 178 cm (5 ft 10 in)
- Weight: 72 kg (159 lb)

Playing career^{1}
| Years | Club | Games (Goals) |
| 1971 | Collingwood | 1 (0) |
- ^{1} Playing statistics correct to the end of 1971.

Denis O'Brien (born 10 April 1952) is a former Australian rules footballer who played with Collingwood in the Victorian Football League (VFL).

Grandfather of former Carlton player, Lochie O'Brien.
