= Dan O'Brien (sports journalist) =

American sports journalist

Dan O'Brien is an American journalist, author and screenwriter with an emphasis in sports, having written books, television sports stories, magazine articles and a screenplay.

In 2005, O'Brien collaborated with former NFL player and ESPN college football analyst Mark May on Mark May's Tales from the Washington Redskins. The book was promoted through public appearances, including a December 2005 signing in Northern Virginia.

== Career ==
A 1977 graduate of the University of Missouri's School of Journalism, O'Brien is a former television anchor, reporter and producer, including stints with network affiliates in Columbia, Missouri; Montgomery, Alabama; Grand Rapids, Michigan; Miami, Florida; Washington, D.C.; Pittsburgh, Pennsylvania; and Indianapolis, Indiana.

His documentaries and special programming earned numerous broadcasting honors, including an Emmy Award for his series on women's athletics at the University of Miami. Speed, Crash, Rescue, a documentary written and produced by O'Brien about safety issues in the IndyCar racing series, received worldwide distribution.

== Books and baseball writing ==
In 2004, O'Brien co-authored MizzouRah! Memorable Moments in Missouri Tiger Football History with Los Angeles sportscaster Todd Donoho.

A former committee member with the Society for American Baseball Research (SABR), O'Brien wrote biographies of Rube Waddell and Ossee Schreckengost for Deadball Stars of the American League, published by SABR and Potomac Books.

He was a founding member of the board of directors of the Pittsburgh Pandas of the Tri-State Summer Collegiate Baseball League.

== Screenwriting ==
O'Brien was a script consultant for two films by director Ryan Little, Outlaw Trail: The Treasure of Butch Cassidy (2006) and Forever Strong (2008).

He wrote a screenplay based on the life of Baseball Hall of Famer Rube Waddell, titled Rube. Rube was a third-place finisher in the Free Screenplay Contest, which received nearly 2,000 entries worldwide. Rube was also a quarterfinalist in the BlueCat Screenplay Competition.

In 2019, the University of Missouri School of Journalism reported that Rube had won the Grand Jury Prize for Outstanding Screenplay at the Film Invasion Los Angeles Festival.
