= EMPICS =

EMPICS, a PA Media company, is a UK firm which deals with licensing photographs of people and events for the press and other mass news media.

EMPICS is the photo licensing arm of the PA Images division, bringing together the news, sport and entertainment picture productions and archives of PA Media (formerly known as the Press Association), EMPICS, AP and niche photographers.

== History ==
EMPICS, originally known as East Midlands Pictures, was founded in 1985 by Phil O'Brien, as a news/sport/features photographic agency after covering the East Midlands M1 plane crash. Profits were invested in colour wiring equipment and with the company then focusing on sports photography.

EMPICS was based in Musters Road, Nottingham, very near to the Trent Bridge Cricket Ground and home stadiums of Nottingham Forest and Notts County. Towards the end of the 1990s, it was branded as Empic Sports Photo Agency. Over the years many staff moved on to work for rivals Allsport including Picture Desk Manager John Childs who left in 1997 along with photographer Laurence Griffiths. EMPICS later moved into the centre of Nottingham and expanded with many new sales staff.

Empics were the original official photographers of the UEFA Champions League with photographers shooting team photos and headshots of the participating teams for the TV broadcasters and also commercial and advertising photography for TEAM Marketing who produce the UCL. It acquired the collection of FIFA Photographer Peter Robinson gained the reputation as a worldwide stock football agency covering global soccer tournaments.

On 11 May 2004, EMPICS Ltd was acquired by the Press Association with business partners Caroline Hodinott and Phil O'Brien eventually leaving the company to be managed by PA.

Past directors include award-winning photographers Ross Kinnaird, Steve Etherington, Neal Simpson and Phil O'Brien.

Past news photographers include Phil O'Brien and British Press Award winner Rob Rathbone.

Past sport photographers include:

- Ross Kinnaird (who left to join Allsport/Getty)
- Laurence Griffiths (who left to join Allsport/Getty)
- Steve Morton
- Rui Viera (who left and now works for PA)
- Steve Etherington (now a successful freelance Motor Sport Photographer)
- Matthew Ashton (who left and now runs AMA Sports Photo Agency)
- Graham Chadwick (who left to join Allsport/Getty and now works for the Daily Mail)
- Claire Mackintosh (who left and now runs Clickers Photography Ltd)
- Nick Potts (who left and now works for PA)
- Michael Regan (who left Action Images only to rejoin them a matter of weeks later, after writing off a company car on his last day by driving into a ticket machine at Luton airport. - now owns Getty Images)
- Andy Heading (now photographer to the European Athletic Association and co-director of www.racekit.co.uk)
- Paul Marriott (now a freelance photographer)
- Steve Mitchell (Notts Evening Post)
- Michael Steele (who left to join Allsport/Getty)
- Laurence Griffiths (who left to join Allsport/Getty)
- John Marsh (now a freelance photographer)

Other notable employees within the industry include:

- Martin Willetts (ex Telegraph Sport picture editor, currently works at Regan Images)
- John Childs AKA JC (who left to join Allsport/Getty)
- Simon Galloway (now group picture editor Bristol News & Media)
- Adam Chantrey
- Joanna Adams
- Steve Mitchell (Notts Evening Post)
- Andy Baldwin (who died in a car accident in South Africa)
- Shawn Russell (now a London-based picture editor)
- Simon Wilkinson (now running SWpix)
- Graham Cross (ex Corbis)
- Jed Leicester (BPI)
- Sarah Jeynes (now a music photographer with BBC)
- Jaffa [David McMahon] who now runs MSc Biological Photography & Imaging at The University of Nottingham
- Martin Aspley

Current photographers include Neal Simpson, Michael Egerton, Adam Davy, Steve Pond, Tony Marshall, Barry Coombs and John Walton.

Collections include:

- Press Association
- Associated Press - worldwide news sport and showbiz
- EMPICS Sport
- EMPICS Entertainment
