= Simon O'Brien =

Simon O'Brien may refer to:

- Simon O'Brien (politician) (born 1960), Liberal member of the Western Australian Legislative Council
- Simon O'Brien (presenter) (born 1965), British television and radio personality
