= Edward Brien =

Former Archdeacon of Emly

Edward Henry Brien (1811–1902) was Archdeacon of Emly from 1858 until 1880.

Brien was born in Devon and educated at Trinity College, Dublin. He was the rector of Enniskerry until his appointment as archdeacon.
