= Shane O'Brien =

Shane O'Brien may refer to:

- Shane O'Brien (ice hockey) (born 1983), Canadian ice hockey defenceman
- Shane O'Brien (rower) (born 1960), New Zealand rower
- Shane O'Brien (hurler) (born 2004), Irish hurler
