= Gerard O'Brien (cricketer) =

Irish cricketer

Personal information
- Full name: Gerard Peter O'Brien
- Born: 12 November 1942 (age 84); Dublin, Leinster, Ireland
- Batting: Right-handed

Domestic team information
- Years: Team
- 1976–1977: Ireland

Career statistics
Competition	First-class
Matches	2
Runs scored	22
Batting average	5.50
100s/50s	–/–
Top score	11
Balls bowled	90
Wickets	0
Bowling average	–
5 wickets in innings	–
10 wickets in match	–
Best bowling	–
Catches/stumpings	3/–
- Source: Cricinfo, 21 October 2018

Gerard Peter O'Brien (born 12 November 1942) is a former Irish first-class cricketer.

O'Brien was born at Dublin in County Down and was educated in the city at O'Connell School. A wicket-keeper for Malahide at club level, O'Brien played two first-class cricket matches for Ireland. The first came against Scotland at Glasgow in 1976, with his second match coming against the same opposition at Dublin in 1977. Across his two first-class matches, O'Brien scored a total of 22 runs, with a high score of 11. He worked in the insurance industry as his profession.
