= Kerry O'Brien =

Kerry O'Brien is the name of:

- Kerry O'Brien (athlete) (1946–2025), Australian steeple chaser and long-distance runner
- Kerry O'Brien (journalist) (born 1945), Australian journalist and television presenter
- Kerry O'Brien (politician) (born 1951), Australian politician, Senator for Tasmania
