= Conor O'Brien =

Conor O'Brien may refer to:

- Conor O'Brien (died 1603), Irish nobleman and landowner
- Conor O'Brien (died 1651), Royalist Commander during the Irish Confederate Wars
- Edward Conor Marshall O'Brien (1880–1952), Irish aristocrat, republican, nationalist, sailor
- Conor Cruise O'Brien (1917–2008), Irish writer, politician, and diplomat
- Conor O'Brien, 18th Baron Inchiquin (1943–2023), Irish peer
- Conor O'Brien, 19th Baron Inchiquin (born 1952), Irish peer
- Conor O'Brien (hurler) (born 1985), Tipperary intercounty player
- Conor O'Brien (soccer) (born 1988), American soccer player
- Conor O'Brien (rugby union) (born 1996), Irish rugby union player
- Conor O'Brien, Irish musician and member of Villagers

== See also ==
- Connor O'Brien (disambiguation)
- Conor O'Brian, American wrestler
