= Danny O'Brien =

Danny O'Brien may refer to:

- Danny O'Brien (Australian rules footballer) (born 1980), former Australian rules footballer
- Danny O'Brien (boxer) (1939–2001), Irish Olympic boxer
- Danny O'Brien (gridiron football) (born 1990), American football quarterback
- Danny O'Brien (journalist) (born 1969), British technology journalist and civil liberties activist
- Danny O'Brien (politician) (born 1974), Australian politician and Member of the Victorian Legislative Assembly
- Danny O'Brien, character in The Affairs of Martha
- Danny O'Brien (footballer, born 1996), English footballer for Finnish side SJK
- Danny O'Brien (racing driver) (born 1967), 14 time track champion of Brockville Ontario Speedway

== See also ==
- Daniel O'Brien (disambiguation)
