= George O'Brien (1900s footballer) =

English footballer

George O'Brien was an English footballer. His regular position was as a forward. He played for Manchester United in 1901 and 1902.
