= Dan O'Brien (footballer) =

Australian rules footballer

Personal information
- Full name: Dan O'Brien
- Born: 27 October 1884
- Died: 26 June 1917 (aged 32)

Playing career^{1}
| Years | Club | Games (Goals) |
| 1907 | St Kilda | 2 (0) |
- ^{1} Playing statistics correct to the end of 1907.

Dan O'Brien (27 October 1884 – 26 June 1917) was an Australian rules footballer who played with St Kilda in the Victorian Football League (VFL).
