= Patrick O'Brien (footballer, born 1884) =

Scottish footballer

Personal information
- Full name: Patrick Aloysius O'Brien
- Date of birth: 8 February 1884
- Place of birth: Garnethill, Scotland
- Position: Centre forward

Senior career*
Years	Team	Apps	(Gls)
1912	Queen's Park	2	(0)
- * Club domestic league appearances and goals

Patrick Aloysius O'Brien was a Scottish amateur football centre forward who played in the Scottish League for Queen's Park.

== Personal life ==
O'Brien had a wife, four sons and two daughters. He served as a captain in the Royal Army Medical Corps during the First World War and later became a casualty surgeon for the Glasgow Police. In May 1941, during the Second World War, O'Brien was called to examine Nazi Deputy Führer Rudolf Hess, who had landed near Eaglesham on an attempted peace mission.

== Career statistics ==
Appearances and goals by club, season and competition
Club	Season	League			Scottish Cup		Total	
Club	Season	Division	Apps	Goals	Apps	Goals	Apps	Goals
Queen's Park	1912–13	Scottish First Division	2	0	0	0	2	0
Career total			2	0	0	0	2	0
