= Mick O'Brien =

Mick O'Brien may refer to:

- Mick O'Brien (boxer) (born 1954), Australian Olympic boxer
- Mick O'Brien (footballer, born 1893), Irish international football player
- Mick O'Brien (footballer, born 1979), English football player
- Mick O'Brien (musician) (born 1961), Irish musician
- Mickey O'Brien, English composer and musician

== See also ==
- Michael O'Brien (disambiguation)
