= Donald O'Brien =

Donald O'Brien may refer to:

- Donald O'Brien (actor) (1930–2018), French-born Italian film and television actor
- Donald E. O'Brien (1923–2015), U.S. district judge
- Domnall Mór Ua Briain (died 1194), King of Thomond in Ireland (1168–1194)
- Donald O'Brien (1990s), fictional white supremacist
