= Richard O'Brien Three-Decker =

- U.S. National Register of Historic Places
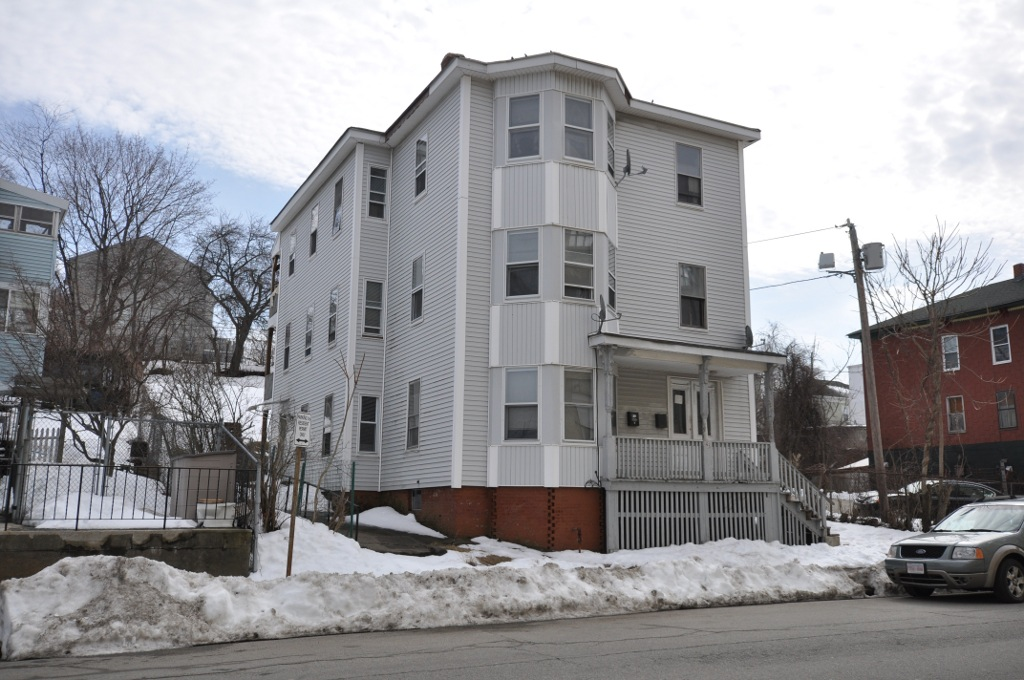

- Location within Massachusetts Location within the United States
- Location: 43 Suffolk St., Worcester, Massachusetts
- Coordinates: 42°15′30″N 71°47′15″W
- Area: less than one acre
- Built: 1890
- Architectural style: Queen Anne
- MPS: Worcester Three-Deckers TR
- NRHP reference No.: 89002441
- Added to NRHP: February 9, 1990

The Richard O'Brien Three-Decker is a historic triple-decker in Worcester, Massachusetts. The house was built c. 1890, and was noted for its well-preserved Queen Anne styling when it was listed on the National Register of Historic Places in 1990. A number of these details have been lost or obscured (see photo).

== Description and history ==
The Richard O'Brien Three-Decker is located southeast of downtown Worcester, on the east side of Suffolk Street in a mixed residential-industrial area. It is a three-story wood-frame structure, with a hip roof and exterior clad in modern siding. Its front facade is asymmetrical, with a three-story rounded window bay on the left, and the main entrance on the right. The entrance is sheltered by a porch with bracketed turned posts and a plain 20th-century balustrade. The entrance is a pair of paneled doors, each with frosted windows framed by a bracketed cornice. The exterior of the house was originally more elaborate: the main roof eave was bracketed, the porch balustrade had turned balusters, and the window bay had bands of decorative cut shingles between the floors. These features have been lost or obscured by the application of modern siding.

The house was built about 1890, serving as worker housing for people employed either in the nearby railroad yards or factories. Richard O'Brien, the first owner, was a painter, and his family owned the house until at least 1920. Tenants included laborers and leatherworkers, primarily of Irish extraction.

== See also ==
- National Register of Historic Places listings in eastern Worcester, Massachusetts
