= Leo O'Brien =

Leo O'Brien may refer to:

- Leo O'Brien (actor) (1970–2012), American television and film actor
- Leo O'Brien (cricketer) (1907–1997), Australian cricketer
- Leo F. O'Brien (1924-1968), American politician, member of the Illinois House of Representatives
- Leo P. O'Brien (1893–1968), American politician, member of the Wisconsin State Senate
- Leo W. O'Brien (1900–1982), American politician, Representative from New York
