= Terrence O'Brien (director) =

American theatre director (born 1953)

Terrence O’Brien
- Born: 3/17/1953
- Education: University of Notre Dame
- Occupation: Theatre director
- Years active: Since 1987

Terrence O’Brien is an American theatre director. O'Brien is a graduate of University of Notre Dame, and received advanced training in acting and directing at American Conservatory Theater, A.C.T. in San Francisco. He is the Founding Artistic Director of the Hudson Valley Shakespeare Festival, which began in 1987 with a modest outdoor production of A Midsummer Night's Dream, produced in cooperation with the 29th Street Project. In 1988, the Festival moved to Boscobel, a Hudson River museum estate in Garrison, New York. Once in its new home and under a big tent, the festival grew dramatically, from its first season audience of 230 to 37,000 in 2010. Dedicated to producing the plays of Shakespeare with an economy of style that focuses its energy and resources on script, actors, and audience, the festival draws theater-goers from the tri-state area and beyond.

As noted by Terry Teachout in 2008, "Mr. O'Brien keeps things simple and light, letting the verse speak for itself, and the result is a staging that makes perfect sense of a play that long was thought to be one of Shakespeare's weakest efforts. It is, in fact, a masterpiece worthy of direct comparison with "The Tempest," and this unassuming production makes plain its virtues." Anita Gates also noted O'Brien's leaned down approach, "you always know what you’re going to get: spare, streamlined, playful Shakespeare with laughs (even in the tragedies)."

Among the over thirty productions O'Brien directed at Hudson Valley Shakespeare Festival: King Lear, Love's Labour's Lost, Hamlet, Troilus and Cressida, Pericles, All's Well That Ends Well, Henry V, The Merchant of Venice, Measure for Measure, Titus Andronicus, Macbeth, The Merry Wives of Windsor, The Taming of the Shrew, Romeo and Juliet, Much Ado About Nothing, Twelfth Night, As You Like It, A Midsummer Night's Dream, Tartuffe, Cymbeline, and The Winter's Tale. He directed A Midsummer Night's Dream for the first annual Stratford Arts Commission Shakespeare Season in Stratford, Connecticut.

O'Brien is the founder and director of the New World Shakespeare Lab, a New York City group which experiments with rehearsal techniques and seeks to find a more spontaneous way of acting Shakespeare. He lives in New York, NY with his wife, Jane, and his two children, Leo and Jenne.
