= Denny O'Brien =

American columnist, journalist and radio commentator

Dennis Avery O'Brien III (born February 9, 1973, in Laurinburg, NC) is an American columnist, journalist and radio commentator. He has risen to cult fame status through his numerous internet columns about college football and college athletics. He is a Harris Interactive College Football Poll voter and is featured primarily as a columnist on bonesville.net.

O'Brien is a contributor and one time editor of "The Pirates' Chest", which is the official magazine of East Carolina University athletics, a monthly publication that is distributed to all members of the ECU Pirate Club. O'Brien also has penned freelance articles for East Magazine and the ACC Area Sports Journal.

"D.O.B.", as he is commonly known, has appeared on various radio shows as a guest and commentator on such stations as WPTF-AM, WRBZ, WDNC-AM, and WTIB-FM. O'Brien worked with the Curtis Media Group as a correspondent for The Big Tailgate Show, a syndicated radio program centered on college football that aired each Saturday during the fall in North Carolina for three seasons. He worked during the 2008 season in Greenville, NC on WTIB-FM and Cable 7 as the post-game show co-host for ECU football. O'Brien worked in 2009 as a co-host of WTIB's East Carolina University football pre-game show, and as a correspondent in 2010. O'Brien has been affiliated with various pre-game shows for ECU football since the early 2000s.

Denny is no longer a member of the media, but possesses a large following on “X”. While he does not serve within the media, he’s often found in Dowdy-Ficklen Stadium cheering on the Pirates.

O’Brien served as the head coach of the Raleigh Knights in the Wilson/Smithfield Tobs High School Fall League in 2025 and 2026.

O'Brien resides in Raleigh, North Carolina, is a father of two, and is a workout enthusiast.
