= Shannon O'Brien =

Shannon O'Brien may refer to:

- Shannon O'Brien (Massachusetts politician)
- Shannon O'Brien (Montana politician)
- Shannon O'Brien (footballer)
