= Jesse O'Brien =

Jesse O'Brien may refer to:

- Jesse O'Brien (footballer) (born 1990), Australian rules football player
- Jesse O'Brien, contestant with season 2 of New Zealand Idol
- Jesse O'Brien (director), Australian film director of Arrowhead (2016) and Two Heads Creek (2019)
