= Kevin O'Brien =

Kevin O'Brien may refer to:

== Sportsmen ==
- Kevin O'Brien (American football) (born 1970), American football player
- Kevin O'Brien (Australian footballer) (1932–2020), Australian rules footballer
- Kevin O'Brien (cricketer) (born 1984), Irish cricketer
- Kevin O'Brien (Dublin Gaelic footballer) (born 1991), Gaelic footballer for Dublin
- Kevin O'Brien (rugby league) (born 1932), Australian rugby league footballer
- Kevin O'Brien (rugby union) (born 1955), 1980s Ireland rugby union international
- Kevin O'Brien (rugby union coach), Welsh rugby union coach
- Kevin O'Brien (Wicklow Gaelic footballer), Irish Gaelic footballer

== Politicians ==
- Kevin O'Brien (Newfoundland and Labrador politician) (born 1956), Newfoundland and Labrador MHA
- Kevin O'Brien (Nunavut politician) (born 1956), Nunavut and Northwest Territories MLA

== Others ==
- Kevin F. O'Brien, American Jesuit and educational leader
- Kevin O'Brien (architect) (born 1972), architect in Queensland
- Kevin O'Brien (author), railroad inspector and novelist
- Kevin O'Brien (director), American director and storyboard artist
