= Catherine O'Brien (film scholar) =

British film scholar

Catherine O'Brien (born in 1962) is a British academic, film scholar, linguist and writer. Her main fields are French cinema; the First World War in French and German cultures in relation to art and comparative literature and the intersections between cinema, theology and religion.

== Early life and education ==
O'Brien obtained a Bachelor of Arts (1985) as well as a Doctor of Philosophy (Ph.D.;1994) both in French and German from the University of Hull in Kingston upon Hull, a city in the East Riding of Yorkshire, England.

== Academic career ==
From 1989 to 2017, O'Brien was a senior lecturer at Kingston University, a public research university located within the Royal Borough of Kingston upon Thames, in South West London, United Kingdom. O'Brien was mainly based at the Faculty of Arts and Social Sciences (FASS) at the Penrhyn Road Campus. She taught a wide range of courses on both the French and the Film Studies degrees and was a Module Leader for French Cinema, New Wave Cinema, European Cinema, Female Archetypes on Screen and final-year French Language. O'Brien was the Course Director for the Master of Art in Film Studies from 2003 to 2007. As Director of Studies, she has supervised Doctorate theses. She went on to become the co-director of the Center for Marian Studies at the University of Roehampton in England. O'Brien has been a visiting professor at several universities in the West such as the University of Westminster or the University of Notre Dame located in South Bend in Indiana.

== Selected bibliography ==
Non-exhaustive list of her works:

=== Books ===
- Martin Scorsese's Divine Comedy: Movies and Religion (2018, ISBN 9781350003309).
- The Celluloid Madonna: From Scripture to Screen - investigating the screen portrait of the Virgin Mary (2011, ISBN 9780231501811).
- Women's Fictional Responses to the First World War: A Comparative Study of Selected Texts by French and German Writers (1997, ISBN 0820431419).

=== Articles ===
- "Love, What Have You Done to Me?" Eros and agape in Alfred Hitchcock's I Confess. Journal of Religion and Film, 18(1), (2014, ISSN 1092-1311).
- "In Bruges: heaven or hell?" Literature and Theology, 26(1), pp. 93–105. (2012, ISSN 0269-1205).
- "Marian film in the 21st century". Marian Studies, 60, pp. 287–296. (2009, ISSN 0464-9680).
- "Mythological readings of Mary's motherhood". Marian Studies, 57, (2006, ISSN 0464-9680).
- "Seeking perfection of form: French cultural responses to the dogma of the Immaculate Conception". Marian Studies, LV, pp. 114–134. (2004, ISSN 0464-9680).
- "From sacred to secular: translations of the infancy narratives in Twentieth Century French culture". Maria: A Journal of Marian Studies, 3(2), pp. 226–238,(2003, ISSN 1462-4087).
- "When radical meets conservative: Godard, Delannoy and the Virgin Mary". Literature and theology: an international journal of religion, theory and culture, 15(2), pp. 174–186, (2001, ISSN 0269-1205).
- "Book Review of: Writing otherwise: Atlan, Duras, Giraudon, Redonnet, and Wittig by Jeannette Gaudet". French Studies, 55(2), pp. 276–277, (2001, ISSN 0016-1128).
- "Beyond the can[n]on: French women's responses to the First World War". French Cultural Studies, 7(20), pp. 201–213, (1996, ISSN 0957-1558).

=== Book sections ===
- "Women in the cinematic gospels". In: Burnette-Bletsch, Rhonda, (ed.) The Bible in motion : a handbook of the Bible and its reception in film. Berlin, Germany: Walter de Gruyter GmbH & Co KG. pp. 449–462, (2016, ISBN 9781614515616).
- "Mary in film". In: Boss, Sarah Jane, (ed.) Mary: the complete resource. London, U.K. : Continuum. pp. 532–536, (2007, ISBN 0860123413).
- "Mary in modern European literature". In: Boss, Sarah Jane, (ed.) Mary: the complete resource. London, U.K. : Continuum. pp. 521–531, (2007, ISBN 0860123413).
- "Sacrificial rituals and wounded hearts: the uses of Christian symbolism in French and German women’s responses to the First World War". In: Fell, Alison S. and Sharp, Ingrid, (eds.) The Women’s Movement in Wartime: International Perspectives, 1914–19. Basingstoke, UK : Palgrave Macmillan. pp. 244–259, (2007, ISBN 0230019668).
- "A double message: French literary responses to Mariology". In: Cooke, Paul and Lee, Jane, (eds.) (Un)faithful texts? : religion in France and Francophone literature, from the 1780s to the 1980s. New Orleans, USA : University Press of the South. pp. 201–213, (2000, ISBN 1889431524).
- "There is no greater love: Biblical imagery in Women's First World War literature". In: Schneider, Thomas F, (ed.) The experience of war and the creation of myths : the image of modern war in literature, theatre, photography, and film. Osnabrück, Germany : Universitätsverlag Rasch. pp. 339–351, (1999, ISBN 9783934005143).

== Conferences ==
- Scorsese’s divine tragedy - Roehampton, U.K. (october 2013)
- Biblical tales - a mother's love: adapting the story of Mary and Jesus for the screen - European Cinema Research Forum Annual Conference in Ormskirk, U.K (16-18 July 2012).
- "Ave Maria”: sacred spaces in 'Lourdes' and '28 Days Later' - NECS Conference: Sonic Futures: soundscapes and the languages of screen media, London, U.K.. (June 2011)
- Agape: a maternal narrative. In: Representations of Love in Film and Television; 11–14 November, Milwaukee, U.S. (2010)
- In Bruges: heaven or hell? - European Network for Cinema and Media Studies Annual Conference; 24 - 27 Jun, Istanbul, Turkey. (2010).
- An ordinary extraordinary couple: performing the life of Mary and Joseph - Kingston upon Thames, U.K. (July 2009).
- The life of Mary in film - The Mariological Society of America 60th Annual Program, Florida, U.S. (May 2009).
- The celluloid Madonna : re-visioning the narrative of the mother of Jesus, Southampton, U.K. (September 2008)
- Mythological readings of Mary's motherhood - Mariological Society of America 57th Annual Meeting, Detroit, U.S. (May 2006).
- The nature of sacrifice. In: The Gentler Sex? Responses of the women's movement to the First World War 1914–1919, London, U.K. (September 2005).
- The marshmallow effect: writing the life of the Virgin Mary in French culture - Society of French Studies Conference, Sheffield, U.K. (July 2003).

== See also ==
- France–Germany relations.
- List of religious films.
- Cinema of France.
