= Miles M. O'Brien =

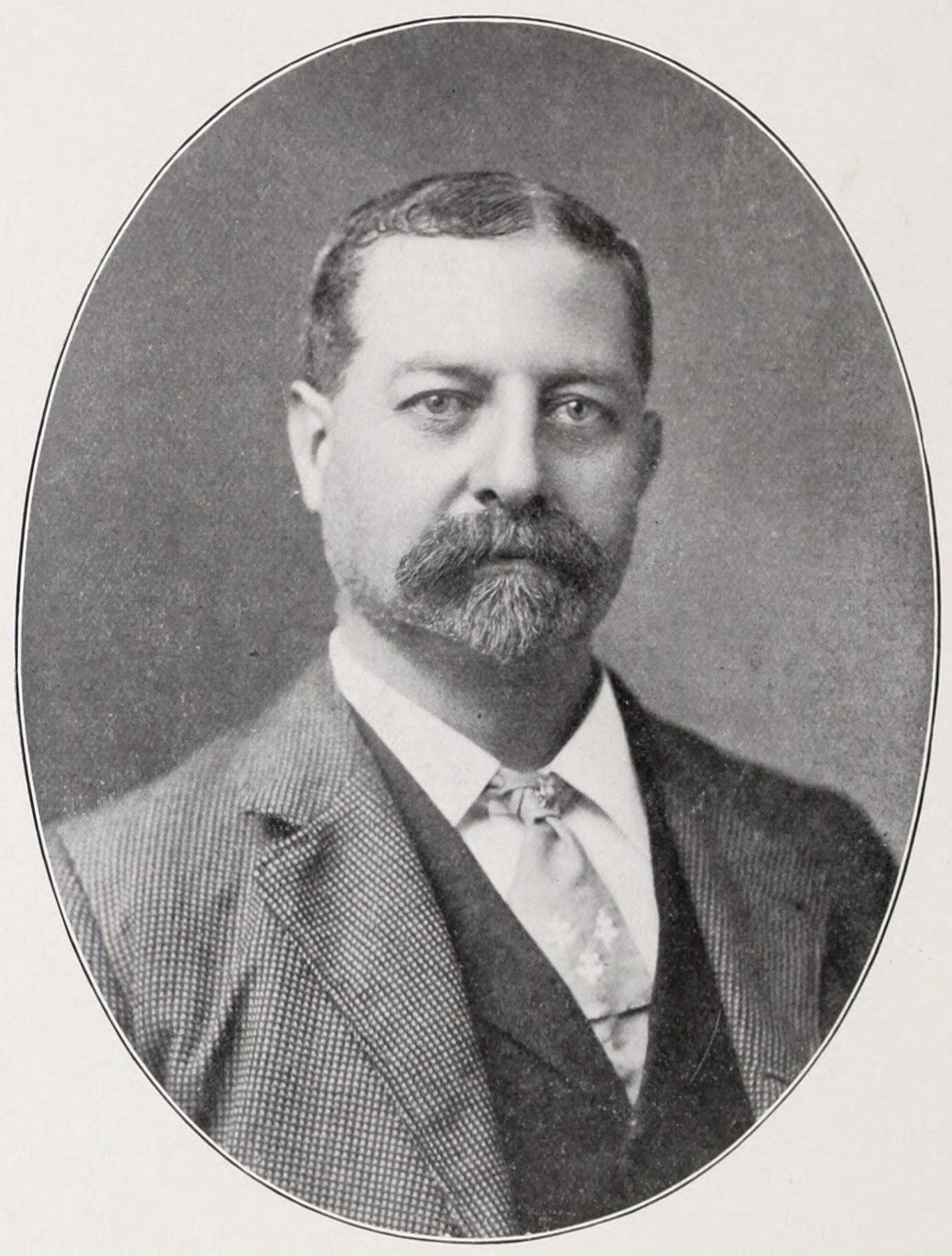

Miles M. O'Brien (1852 – December 22, 1910) was a banker and former president of the New York City Board of Education, who was born in Ireland. His parents were Dr. Miles O'Brien and Fanny Casey O'Brien. He went to the United States at the age of twelve. He became president of the New Amsterdam National Bank, vice-president of the Mercantile National Bank, and director of the American Ice Company. His great-great-grandson (and namesake) Miles O'Brien is a correspondent for CNN based in New York City.

== Education and career ==
He started as a clerk in a dry goods store and was educated by the Congregation of Christian Brothers and in the Model School. He earned an L.L.D. degree from St. John's College, which became Fordham University. O'Brien served on the board of education for twenty years, having been appointed its first vice-president by New York City mayor William R. Grace. Among his contributions were the free lecture system, free baths, and the high school of commerce. He was an advocate of teachers' pension laws and participated in Democratic Party politics. In 1900 O'Brien became president of the board of education. He was removed from the school board by William L. Strong but reinstated by Robert A. Van Wyck.

== Death ==
O'Brien died of an intestinal disorder at his home at 320 West 89th Street in Manhattan, New York in 1910. His funeral was conducted from the Church of the Blessed Sacrament on West 71st Street, Manhattan.
