= Paul O'Brien =

Paul O'Brien may refer to:

- Paul O'Brien (scholar) (1763–1820), Irish language scholar and Catholic priest
- Paul O'Brien (Australian footballer, born 1948), VFL footballer for Fitzroy
- Paul O'Brien (Australian footballer, born 1950), VFL footballer for Carlton
- Paul O'Brien (chemist) (1954–2018), professor of chemistry
- Paul O'Brien (Australian footballer, born 1961), VFL footballer for Essendon and Melbourne
- Paul O'Brien (Scottish footballer) (born 1967), Scottish footballer
- Paul O'Brien (equestrian) (born 1968), New Zealand equestrian
- Paul O'Brien (actor) (born 1978), Australian actor
- Paul O'Brien (rugby league), Australian rugby league footballer of the 1970s
