= Ron O'Brien =

Ron O'Brien may refer to:

- Ron O'Brien (coach), American diving coach
- Ron O'Brien (DJ) (1951–2008), American disc jockey
- Ron O'Brien (footballer) (born 1942), Australian rules footballer for Richmond
- Ronnie O'Brien (born 1979), Irish footballer

== See also ==
- Ronald Clark O'Bryan (1944–1984), American murderer
