= Con O'Brien =

Con O'Brien may refer to:

- Con O'Brien (American football) (1898–1993), American football player and police officer
- Con O'Brien (politician) (1866–1938), Australian politician
