= Joseph O'Brien =

Joseph O'Brien may refer to:

- Joseph Patrick O'Brien (born 1993), Irish jockey and racehorse trainer
- Joseph O'Brien (singer), American singer and songwriter
- Joseph C. O'Brien (born 1965), mayor of Worcester, Massachusetts, USA
- Joseph J. O'Brien (1897–1953), U.S. congressman from New York
- Joseph Leonard O'Brien (1895–1973), lieutenant governor of New Brunswick
- Joseph O'Brien (rower), Australian rower
- Joe O'Brien (basketball) (born 1955), basketball player
- Joe O'Brien (footballer) (1875 – after 1906), Scottish football full back
- Joey O'Brien (born 1986), Irish international and former Bolton Wanderers footballer
- Joey Aiuppa (1907–1997), American mobster whose nicknames include "Joey O'Brien"
