= Liam Ó Briain =

Irish language expert and political activist (1888–1974)

Liam Ó Briain (16 September 1888 – 12 August 1974) was an Irish language expert and political activist.

Born in North Wall, Dublin as William O'Brien, he took an interest in the Irish language from an early age and while still at the O'Connell School started using the Irish version of his name. He also attended meetings of the Gaelic League, then attended University College Dublin (UCD) on a scholarship, where he studied French, English and Irish, receiving a BA and an MA.

UCD decided to start awarding one annual scholarship for overseas travel in 1911, and Ó Briain won the first one, using it to visit Germany and study under Kuno Meyer and Rudolf Thurneysen. After three years, he returned home, where he rejoined the Gaelic League and began teaching French at UCD. He also joined the Irish Volunteers then, the following year, Seán T. O'Kelly convinced him to join the Irish Republican Brotherhood.

During the Easter Rising, Ó Briain saw action with the Irish Citizen Army. He came into conflict with his commander, Michael Mallin, as he wanted to pursue a strategy without the Dublin brigade being "cooped up in the city". However, Mallin overruled him and insisted they should focus on taking Dublin Castle. He spent two months in prison and six at an internment camp before being released to discover that he had been fired from his job, but quickly obtained a professorship in Romance languages at University College Galway (UCG).

Around this time, Ó Briain joined Sinn Féin, and he stood unsuccessfully for the party in Mid Armagh at the 1918 Irish general election, taking 5,689 votes. His campaign led, indirectly, to another prison sentence. On release, he was appointed as a judge in the then-illegal republican court system, and visited both France and Italy to try to source weapons for the Irish Republican Army. In November 1920, he was again arrested and interned for just over a year, thereby missing the conclusion of the Irish War of Independence. By the time he was released, the Anglo-Irish Treaty had been signed; he supported this, and took no further part in militant activity.

In the newly independent Ireland, Ó Briain remained a professor at Galway. He also stood in the 1925 Seanad election, although he was not successful. He was the founding secretary of the Taibhdhearc na Gaillimhe theatre, also acting in many of its productions, and spent much time translating works from English and the Romance languages into Irish. He stood to become president of UCG in 1945, but was not elected, and in the 1940s and 1950s was best known for his many appearances on television and radio.

On 1 September 1921 he married Helen Lawlor. The couple's only child was the journalist Eibhlín Ní Bhriain.
