= Brayan Torres =

Colombian footballer (born 1998)

Personal information
- Full name: Brayan Andrés Torres Quiñones
- Date of birth: 23 January 1998 (age 28)
- Place of birth: Cota, Colombia
- Height: 1.80 m (5 ft 11 in)
- Position: Left winger

Youth career
- –2015: Fortaleza

Senior career*
Years	Team	Apps	(Gls)
2015–2019	Fortaleza	20	(0)
2019	Deportivo Pasto	7	(0)
2020	La Equidad	11	(0)
2021–2022	Botoșani	1	(0)
2021	→ Politehnica Iași (loan)	3	(1)
2023	Comerciantes FC	7	(1)
- * Club domestic league appearances and goals as of 19:28, 10 August 2023 (UTC)

Brayan Andrés Torres Quiñones (born 23 January 1998) is a Colombian professional footballer who plays as a left winger for Liga 2 Comerciantes FC.

== Club career ==
=== FC Botosani ===
He made his league debut on 16 August 2021 in Liga I match against CS Gaz Metan Medias.
