= Lawrence O'Brien =

Lawrence O'Brien or Larry O'Brien could refer to:

- Larry O'Brien (1917–1990), American politician and basketball commissioner
  - Larry O'Brien Championship Trophy, award presented by the National Basketball Association to the winner of the NBA Finals, named for the above
- Larry O'Brien (Canadian politician) (born 1949), former mayor of Ottawa, Ontario
- Lawrence D. O'Brien (1951–2004), member of the Canadian House of Commons from Labrador
- Larry O'Brien, former director of the Glenn Miller Orchestra

== See also ==
- Laurence O'Brien (1792–1870), Irish-Canadian merchant and member of the Newfoundland and Labrador House of Assembly
