= The Regenerative Medicine Institute =

Irish medical research organisation

- Established: 2003
- Focus: Centre for Science, Technology & Engineering

The Regenerative Medicine Institute (REMEDI), was established in 2003 as a Centre for Science, Technology & Engineering in collaboration with National University of Ireland, Galway. It obtained an award of €14.9 million from Science Foundation Ireland over five years.

It conducts basic research and applied research in regenerative medicine, an emerging field that combines the technologies of gene therapy and adult stem cell therapy. The goal is to use cells and genes to regenerate healthy tissues that can be used to repair or replace other tissues and organs in a minimally invasive approach.

Centres for Science, Engineering & Technology help link scientists and engineers in partnerships across academia and industry to address crucial research questions, foster the development of new and existing Irish-based technology companies, attract industry that could make an important contribution to Ireland and its economy, and expand educational and career opportunities in Ireland in science and engineering. CSETs must exhibit outstanding research quality, intellectual breadth, active collaboration, flexibility in responding to new research opportunities, and integration of research and education in the fields that SFI supports.
