= Richard Henry O'Brien =

American diplomat and privateer (c. 1758 – 1824)

Richard O’Brien
- Born: c. 1758
- Died: February 17, 1824 (aged 65–66); Washington D.C.
- Burial place: Congressional Cemetery, Washington D.C.
- Military career
- Service years: 1799–1803 Consul to Algiers
- Rank: Consul general

Richard Henry O'Brien (c. 1758 – February 17, 1824) was an American privateer during the American Revolution. He was a captive of Barbary Pirates for ten years and then the U.S. Consul-General to the Barbary state of Algiers.

== Biography ==
Richard Henry O'Brien was born in the year of 1758 at an unknown location. Or born about 1751 according to his obituary

At some point in time O'Brien had been made captain of a Philadelphia merchant ship, the Dauphin. It was on this such ship that on July 30, 1785, about 150 miles west of Lisbon, Portugal, the Dauphin was boarded by an Algerian vessel armed with eighteen cannons. The raiding party of the Algerian vessel reportedly had daggers gripped between their teeth as they seized the Dauphin. After boarding the Dauphin the Algerian pirates took O'Brien and his men hostage and then proceeded to strip O'Brien and his men of their shoes, hats and handkerchiefs, thus leaving them unprotected from the blazing sun.

Upon their arrival in Algiers O'Brien and his men were issued rough sets of native Algerian clothing and two blankets each that were to last for the entire period of captivity which for some had ranged anywhere from between a few weeks to fifty years. As the captain of the Dauphin, O'Brien was treated somewhat better than his men by the Algerians. During O'Brien's period within captivity, he learned the language, represented the interests of the other prisoners, and had become a clerk to the Dey. O'Brien had spent ten years as a slave in Algiers.

A letter dated May 20, 1786, from John Lamb, who was negotiating for their release, indicated that all twenty-one men had survived their first year of captivity. However, numbers only began to decline from there. On December 12, 1799, O'Brien wrote that only fifteen individuals from the Dauphin were still alive.

Thereafter his companions were freed, O'Brien had chosen to remain in Algiers in order to assist the American government as he was by then well-known and a well-connected presence in Algiers from his years of working at the British consulate. Traveling between several cities within Europe, including London, O'Brien had hoped to obtain gold and silver from London bankers and eventually succeeded in securing loans from Portugal and Italy, but, before arriving with the promised merchandise in Algiers, the ship by which O'Brien was travelling, the brig Sophia, was captured by Tripolitan pirates.

Because the Maria had an Algerian passport, Bashaw Yusuf Qaramanli, the ruler of Tripoli, promptly ordered its release. But O'Brien's latest capture had given American Joel Barlow an idea: he commissioned O'Brien to act as his intermediary and to negotiate with the militant bashaw.
