= Paul Byrne (journalist) =

Irish journalist

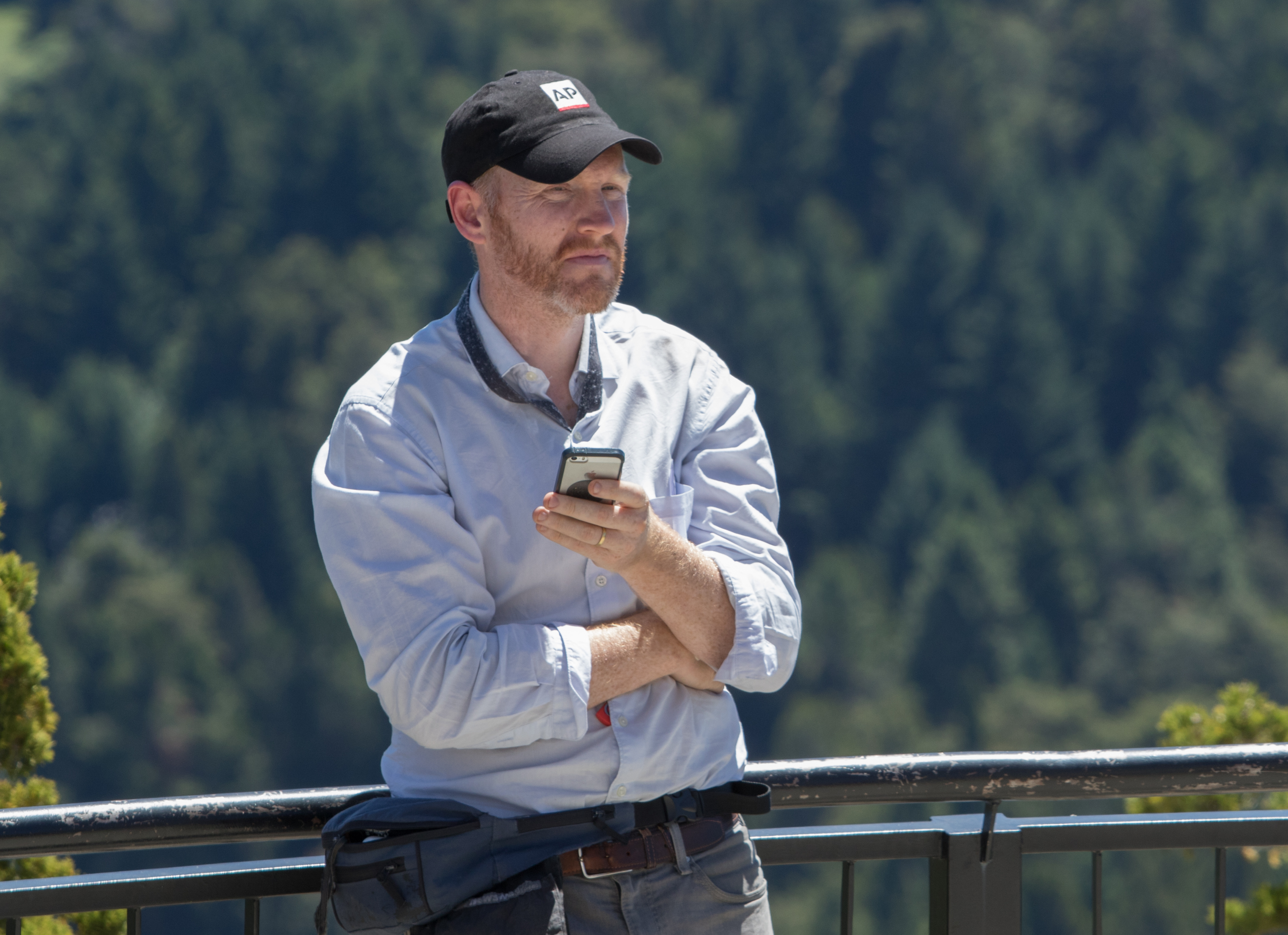
Byrne in 2018

Paul Byrne (born 9 May 1978 in Kilkenny, Ireland) is a broadcast journalist and news director who currently works as AP's news director for Latin America, the Caribbean and Canada.

== Education ==
Byrne graduated with a Bachelor of Business Studies from the Cork Institute of Technology (CIT). Subsequently, he was selected as one of Ireland's top 50 Business Graduates in 2000 as a chosen candidate for the Irish Business and Employers Confederation (Ibec) European Orientation Programme. He worked for six years for a Belgian-based documentary production company, US Television, producing business documentaries for broadcast on CNBC and FOX Network affiliates.

He then went on to do his masters in Broadcast Journalism in the University of Sheffield in 2006. Having worked for BBC as a video-journalist he then took up a position with Russia Today based out of Moscow in November 2006 where he worked as a correspondent for 18 months.

== Career ==
On 1 March 2014 Byrne was appointed as the Associated Press' Senior Producer for Argentina and the Southern Cone of South America. Reporting directly to AP Television's Latin America desk in Washington D.C., he was responsible for all of AP's video coverage from his appointed region. Before this appointment Byrne worked as a freelance multimedia producer for Associated Press Television News based in Buenos Aires, Argentina. His correspondent work has been included on RTÉ (Ireland's public service broadcaster) among other international print and broadcast media such as The Guardian, The Observer and USA Today. On 21 November 2019 Paul Byrne was designated as the Associated Press' news director for Southern South America. On 3 March 2020 Paul Byrne was named as the Associated Press' deputy news director in Latin America and the Caribbean.

Based in Kyiv during August and September 2022, Byrne coordinated AP’s coverage of the milestone date of the Russian invasion, a high-stakes gathering in the city of Lviv that brought together U.N. Secretary-General Antonio Guterres, Turkey's president Erdogan, and Ukrainian President Volodymr Zelenskyy; he led teams to on-location coverage from the front-line in South East Ukraine as IAEA rushed efforts to secure the safety of Europe's biggest nuclear power plant, he also led the agencies coverage through the early soundings of Ukraine’s counter-offensive. Byrne is part of the AP's regional leadership that headed up a team of visual journalists who won the 2024 Pulitzer Prize for Feature Photography as seen in compelling, multi-country photojournalism showing migration from Central America to the United States.

On 28 September 2026, the Associated Press announced that Byrne had been appointed news director for Latin America, the Caribbean and Canada, overseeing all-format coverage in English and Spanish across a region of more than 30 countries. He succeeded Eduardo Castillo, who became AP's news director for Greater China earlier that year.
