= Timothy O'Brien (endocrinologist) =

Irish medical researcher

Timothy O'Brien is an Irish endocrinologist. He is a Professor and Director of The Regenerative Medicine Institute (REMEDI). The Institute was established in collaboration with National University of Ireland, Galway as a Centre for Science, Engineering & Technology (CSET) and has been supported with funding of €14.9 million by Science Foundation Ireland (SFI) to conduct basic and applied research in regenerative medicine, an emerging field that combines the technologies of gene therapy and adult stem cell therapy. The goal is to use cells and genes to regenerate healthy tissues that can be used to repair or replace other tissues and organs with a minimally invasive approach.

== Professional background ==
O'Brien graduated from University College Cork with a MB BCh BAO (Honours) and a PhD. He is a Fellow of the Royal College of Physicians of Ireland and a Fellow of the American College of Endocrinology.

He returned to Ireland from the United States in 2000 where he held positions at University of California-San Francisco and in Endocrinology at the Mayo Clinic, Rochester MN. He focuses his research on cardiovascular disease and has a special interest in diabetic vascular disorders.
