= Henry O'Brien =

Henry O'Brien may refer to:

- Henry O'Brien, Lord Ibrackan (c. 1642–1678), Irish nobleman and politician
- Henry O'Brien, 5th Earl of Thomond (1588–1639), Irish peer
- Henry O'Brien, 7th Earl of Thomond (c. 1620–1691), Irish peer
- Henry O'Brien, 8th Earl of Thomond (1688–1741), Irish peer and Member of Parliament
- Henry O'Brien (Australian politician) (1793–1866), Irish-born New South Wales politician
- Henry O'Brien (classicist) (1808–1835), Irish classicist and author
- Henry O'Brien (colonel) (died 1863), colonel of the 11th New York Volunteer Infantry Regiment killed during the New York draft riots
- Henry O'Brien (cyclist) (1910–1973), American cyclist
- Henry D. O'Brien (1842–-1902), Medal of Honor recipient from the American Civil War
- Henry Joseph O'Brien (1896–1976), American prelate of the Roman Catholic Church
- Henry L. O'Brien (c. 1869–1935), American politician from New York
- Henry X. O'Brien (c. 1903–1990), American lawyer and judge
