= Brendan O'Brien =

Brendan O'Brien may refer to:

- Brendan O'Brien (bishop) (born 1943), Roman Catholic archbishop of Kingston, Ontario, Canada
- Brendan O'Brien (cricketer) (born 1942), Irish former cricketer
- Brendan O'Brien (journalist) (1943/1944–2026), Irish journalist on RTÉ's Prime Time current affairs programme
- Brendan O'Brien (record producer) (born 1960), record producer, mixer, engineer, and musician
- Brendan O'Brien (screenwriter), American screenwriter
- Brendan O'Brien (actor) (1962–2023), actor and voice of many Crash Bandicoot characters
