= Gerard O'Brien (judge) =

Irish judge

Judge of the Circuit Court
- In office 18 February 2015 – 5 January 2024
- Nominated by: Government of Ireland
- Appointed by: Michael D. Higgins

Personal details
- Born: 14 November 1964 (age 61) Limerick, Ireland
- Party: Fianna Fáil
- Education: University College Dublin

Gerard O'Brien (born 14 November 1964) is an Irish lawyer and former judge who served as a Judge of the Circuit Court from 2015 to 2024. Prior to his appointment, he was state solicitor for North Tipperary and practiced as a solicitor in Thurles. He was formerly a secondary school teacher and a local politician.

In December 2023, he was found guilty of attempted rape and sexual assault. He resigned as a judge the following month.

== Early life ==
O'Brien was born in 1964. He was born without arms and with one leg as a result of the thalidomide drug. A documentary on RTÉ Radio 1 in 1992 profiled O'Brien and his mother and their experiences of his disability. He attended University College Dublin, from where he graduated in 1986 with a law degree. He later obtained a higher diploma in education in 1987 and master of law in criminology and criminal justice in 2012 from UCD.

He was a secondary school teacher in a Dublin school during the 1990s. He founded Phoenix Productions, a youth musical theatre group in Thurles, in 1998.

== Legal and political career ==
Following his teaching career, O'Brien qualified as a solicitor in March 2003. He first worked at two Dublin firms, Garrett Sheehan & Co Solicitors and Roger Greene & Sons Solicitors.

O'Brien established his own practice in Thurles, Gerard O'Brien Solicitors, in 2006. His practice was involved in childcare, mental health and criminal cases in the courts. The firm was frequently retained by the Child and Family Agency to act for people appointed to the role of guardian at litem. In 2013, he acted for the guardian ad litem appointed to Samantha Azzopardi in the High Court. It was initially believed that Azzopardi was a child, but it was subsequently determined that she was a woman in her twenties. The case attracted media attention in several countries and was featured on Con Girl, a documentary on Paramount+.

O'Brien was elected to Thurles Town Council in the 2009 local elections for Fianna Fáil and served as deputy mayor of Thurles. He was appointed state solicitor for North Tipperary in April 2012 and resigned his position as councillor. He was replaced on the council by Gerard Fogarty. As state solicitor, he brought a prosecution against Michael Lowry for tax law offences in 2014, serving the book of evidence on Lowry in April 2014.

== Judicial career ==
O'Brien was nominated to the Circuit Court to fill a vacancy created by Margaret Heneghan. He was appointed in February 2015. Initially based in Dublin, he was later assigned to the Cork circuit. He heard cases including those involving drugs offences, sexual offences, criminal damage, assault, theft, arson, and road traffic offences. In 2018, O'Brien reviewed an essay written by a man appealing a conviction of drugs possession. On the basis of the essay, he dismissed the conviction. He has heard civil cases involving personal injuries and mental distress.

Following his criminal conviction, O'Brien resigned on 5 January 2024.

== Trial and conviction ==
In 2019, the Garda Síochána received formal complaints from six men about O'Brien relating to events from 1991 to 1997. Four complainants were students in the school where he taught and two knew O'Brien from his home town. He initially denied to Gardaí having had sexual contact any with the complainants, but later claimed he had consensual relations with three of them. He was charged in 2021 with one count of attempted rape and eight counts of sexual assault.

The four-week trial presided over by Alexander Owens in the Central Criminal Court concluded on 22 December 2023. O'Brien pleaded not guilty. Five of the complainants said that they were sexually assaulted after waking up next to O'Brien and the sixth said that he was sexually assaulted in the toilet of a pub. A ten-person jury found O'Brien guilty of the nine charges.

As a result of his conviction, O'Brien is on the sex offender register. He will be sentenced in March 2024.

Following the trial, the Minister for Justice, Helen McEntee, said that she was consulting with Attorney General Rossa Fanning on "the options open to the Government and the Oireachtas". One of the complainants and several politicians made statements seeking his resignation. He later resigned.
