= Kate O'Brian =

American television executive

- Born: New York City, New York, U.S.
- Education: Smith College (BA)
- Parent(s): Jack O'Brian (father); Von Johnston (mother)

Kate O'Brian is an American journalist and television executive. She is the head of news for the E. W. Scripps Company's national news channels, Scripps News and Court TV. She was previously with Al Jazeera America as president of the network and before, ABC News, where she spent most of her career.

== History ==
Formerly she was Senior Vice-president of ABC News in charge of the news division's newsgathering since 2007 which included all ABC News bureaus worldwide, business, law and justice, medical, and investigative units, ABC NewsOne, ABC News Radio and affiliate relations. Prior to that she had worked at the network for over 30 years in various roles including positions with 20/20 and Nightline.

O'Brian began as an intern for 20/20, then moved on to become a television desk assistant in New York City and then joined the staff of "This Week with David Brinkley" when it launched in 1981. She also held the position of general manager of programming for ABC News Radio where she was responsible for editorial content; she has also been an overseas field producer in Rome and London and a producer for "World News Tonight with Peter Jennings," both in Washington DC and New York; she was a manager in talent development and later the primary liaison between ABC News and its 200+ affiliate stations.

O'Brian was named president of Al Jazeera America on July 22, 2013, alongside the naming of Ehab Al Shihabi as interim CEO in charge of business affairs.

== Al Jazeera America ==
O'Brian stated that Al Jazeera America (in particular its news department) was on its way to being the "envy of the industry." She also stated that the channel will be committed to hard news not the salacious "infotainment" made popular on competitor cable news networks. The channel also branched into airing independent documentaries and town hall sessions on particular topics. Al Jazeera America was closed in April 2015 due to low ratings and change in strategy by Al Jazeera Media Network.

== Scripps Media ==
Following the closure of Al Jazeera America, O'Brian consulted for various news organizations, including the Washington Post and Voice of America, on media projects. In April 2021, she was named head of news for E.W. Scripps Company's national news channels, Court TV and Newsy. She was responsible for Newsy's conversion from a cable news channel to a broadcast and streaming news channel starting October 2021, as well as leading Court TV's coverage of major legal events and trials.

== Awards ==
A 30-year ABC News veteran, O'Brian has won an Alfred I. duPont Award as part of the "This Week with David Brinkley" team, an Emmy Award for the 2000 Millennium coverage, and Alfred I. duPont and a Peabody Award for September 11 coverage. In 2015, the School of Mass Communication and Journalism at Kent State University named O'Brian the winner of the Robert G. McGruder Distinguished Guest Lecture and Award for Diversity. "The award recognizes the accomplishments of media professionals who encourage diversity in the field of journalism".

== Personal life ==
Kate O'Brian is the daughter of Jack O'Brian (1914–2000), a former gossip columnist best known for being a champion of Joseph McCarthy and for contributing to serious journalist Don Hollenbeck's suicide. Her sister, Bridget O'Brian, is also a journalist. Bridget worked as a reporter for the New Orleans Times-Picayune, the Wall Street Journal and at Columbia University.
