= Dan O'Brien (American football) =

American football coach and administrator

Biographical details
- Born: May 16, 1963 (age 63)
- Education: St. Thomas (MN) (1987)

Coaching career (HC unless noted)
- 1987–1988: Benilde-St. Margaret's HS (MN) (assistant)
- 1989–1992: Lakeville HS (MN) (assistant)
- 1993–1994: Bemidji HS (MN)
- 1995–1997: Concordia (MN) (assistant)
- 1998–1999: Concordia (MN) (AHC)

Administrative career (AD unless noted)
- 1999–2002: Concordia (MN)
- 2002–2007: Hamline
- 2008–2014: Minnesota (director of football operations)
- 2014–2017: Minnesota (senior associate AD / football)

Head coaching record
- Overall: 7–13 (college)

Accomplishments and honors

Awards
- Concordia (MN) Hall of Fame (2012)

Dan O'Brien (born May 16, 1963) is an American college football coach and administrator. He is currently the Senior Associate Athletic Director for Football at the University of Minnesota in Minneapolis, Minnesota.

O'Brien has served in a number of administrative roles at the University of Minnesota, Hamline University, and Concordia University of St. Paul. He was the head football coach of the Concordia Golden Bears from 1998 to 1999, compiling a record of 7–13 while ushering the team into NCAA Division II status.

== Head coaching record ==
=== College ===
Year	Team	Overall	Conference	Standing	Bowl/playoffs
Concordia Golden Bears (Upper Midwest Athletic Conference) (1998)
1998	Concordia	5–5	3–3		
Concordia Golden Bears (Northern Sun Intercollegiate Conference) (1999)
1999	Concordia	2–8	2–6	T–8th	
Concordia:		7–13	5–9		
Total:		7–13			
