= Justice O'Brien =

Justice O'Brien may refer to:

- Charles H. O'Brien (1920–2007), associate justice of the Tennessee Supreme Court
- Denis O'Brien (politician) (1837–1909), judge of the New York Court of Appeals
- Henry X. O'Brien (1903/04–1990), associate justice of the Supreme Court of Pennsylvania
- James O'Brien (1830–1901), chief justice of the New Mexico Territorial Supreme Court
- John F. O'Brien (judge) (1874–1939), chief judge of the New York Court of Appeals
- Thomas D. O'Brien (1859–1935), associate justice of the Minnesota Supreme Court
