= Brayan López (footballer, born 1987) =

Colombian footballer

Personal information
- Full name: Brayan Styven López Yepes
- Date of birth: 25 June 1987 (age 39)
- Place of birth: Medellín, Colombia
- Height: 1.85 m (6 ft 1 in)
- Position: Goalkeeper

Team information
- Current team: Independiente Medellín
- Number: 1

Senior career*
Years	Team	Apps	(Gls)
2006 – 2008^{1}	Independiente Medellín	57	(0)
2008	Atlético Bucaramanga	18	(0)
2009 - 2010	Independiente Medellín	5	(0)
2012	Club Sportivo San Lorenzo		
- * Club domestic league appearances and goals as of 21:05, 21 March 2010 (UTC)

Brayan Styven López Yepes (born 25 June 1987) is a Colombian footballer. He last played as a goalkeeper for Club Sportivo San Lorenzo in the Copa Paraguay.
