= Eibhlín Ní Bhriain =

- Born: 23 January 1925; 37 Lower Leeson Street, Dublin, Ireland
- Died: 1 January 1986 (aged 60); Baggot Street Hospital
- Parent(s): Liam Ó Briain and Helen Lawlor
- Writing career
- Pen name: Candida
- Genre: journalism

Eibhlín Ní Bhriain (also published as Eileen Mary O'Brien, 23 January 1925 – 1 January 1986) was an Irish journalist and promoter of the Irish language.

== Early life ==
Eibhlín Ní Bhriain was born at 37 Lower Leeson Street, Dublin, Ireland on 23 January 1925. She was the only child of the nationalist and professor Liam Ó Briain and Helen O'Brien (née Lawlor) of Dublin, a suffragette. She attended the Taylor's Hill convent, Galway, going on to enter University College Galway to study Latin, Irish and French, at age 16.

== Career ==
After university, Ní Bhriain worked for the Connacht Tribune. She worked for a time as an official Oireachtas reporter before she left for England to work at The Yorkshire Post. She joined the Irish News Agency in the early 1950s, reporting from London, Dublin and Belfast. She was appointed the northern editor of The Irish Press, reporting on the IRA border campaign in the mid-1950s.

Ní Bhriain wrote a series of articles on Northern Ireland in Irish for Comhar magazine in 1958. They were titled An Tuaisceart (The North), reflecting on the conflict in Northern Ireland during her time as a reporter in Belfast. In 1959 she edited Comhar before taking up a position as the public and press relations officer of Gael Linn. In this post, she was responsible for the promotion of the Irish language, and the weekly cinema newsreel Amharc Éireann (Landscapes of Ireland). She joined The Irish Times in 1965, writing a weekly column, Irishwoman's diary, under the pen name "Candida". Her article "A social sort of column" received critical acclaim for drawing attention to poverty and oppression in Irish society.

She was part of the first cohort of women journalists at The Irish Times (which included Maeve Binchy, Nell McCafferty and Elgy Gillespie) to write not about cookery and fashion but on social affairs and politics. With Donal Foley she started a weekly Irish language feature in the newspaper titled Tuarascáil, and went on to become the newspaper's Irish editor. She was also an active member of the National Union of Journalists.

== Death ==
Ní Bhriain died at Baggot Street Hospital on 1 January 1986, and donated her body to medical research.
