= Joe O'Brien (footballer) =

Scottish footballer

Personal information
- Full name: Joseph O'Brien
- Date of birth: 27 December 1875
- Place of birth: Shettleston, Scotland
- Height: 5 ft 8 in (1.73 m)
- Position: Full back

Senior career*
Years	Team	Apps	(Gls)
- Baillieston Thistle
- Clitheroe
- Sheffield
1896–1900	Reading		
1900–1901	Blackburn Rovers	3	(0)
1901–1902	Aberdeen	11	(2)
1902–1903	Swindon Town	29	(0)
1903–1904	Reading		
1904–1905	Brighton & Hove Albion	28	(0)
1905–1906	Swindon Town	21	(0)
- Stalybridge Rovers
- Haslingden
- * Club domestic league appearances and goals

Joseph O'Brien (27 December 1875 – after 1906) was a Scottish professional footballer who played as a full back in the Football League for Blackburn Rovers, in the Northern League for Aberdeen, and in the Southern League for Reading, Swindon Town and Brighton & Hove Albion. While a Reading player, he was selected for the Southern League representative XI.

== Life and career ==
O'Brien was born in Shettleston, Lanarkshire, in 1875. He played football for Baillieston Thistle, Clitheroe and Sheffield before signing for Southern League club Reading in 1896. He earned a "big reputation" with Reading, was selected for the Southern League representative XI to face the London Association in 1899, and signed for Football League First Division club Blackburn Rovers in April 1900. In the absence of Allan Hardy, he went straight into the team for the league match against Sheffield United on 13 April, which finished as a 3–3 draw. Hardy's return for the visit of Derby County "materially strengthened" the team, according to the Blackburn Standard, whose reporter thought O'Brien had been "of little use" the day before. He made two more league appearances before returning to Scotland where he spent the 1901–02 season with Aberdeen, for whom he scored twice from eleven Northern League matches.

For his next club, Swindon Town, he played in all five FA Cup ties and all but one Southern League fixture in 1902–03. He spent the following season back with Reading, before joining another Southern League club, Brighton & Hove Albion, for 1904–05. He was a regular in their side, partnering Tom Robertson at full back, before returning to Swindon Town for 1905–06. This time he was less of a first-team regular, appearing in 21 Southern League matches and 14 in the United League, a secondary competition. He finished his football career in the north-west of England with Stalybridge Rovers and Haslingden.
