= Mike O'Brien (hurler) =

Irish hurler

Personal information
- Native name: Mícheál Ó Briain (Irish)
- Born: Glenroe, County Limerick

Sport
- Sport: Hurling
- Position: Midfield
Club
- Years: Club
- Glenroe
Inter-county
- Years: County
- 2000-2003, 2006-2011: Limerick
Inter-county titles
- Munster titles: 0
- All-Irelands: 0

Mike O'Brien (born 1978) is an Irish sportsperson. He plays hurling with his local club Glenroe and with the Limerick senior inter-county team.

== Early & private life ==
Mike O'Brien was born in Glenroe, County Limerick in 1978. He was educated locally at Glenroe NS and went on to complete a law degree at Trinity College in the 1990s, playing both Sigerson and Fitzgibbon Cup. He returned home to the land following the completion of his degree and is now a farmer by profession.

== Playing career ==
=== Club ===
O'Brien plays his club hurling with his local Glenroe club and has enjoyed some success. Although not a senior club O'Brien has won a junior county title.

=== Inter-county ===
O'Brien first came to prominence on the inter-county scene as a member of the Limerick intermediate hurling team. He won both Munster and All-Ireland medals at this level in 1998. As a result of this O'Brien joined the county senior team and made his debut in an Oireachtas game against Kilkenny in October 1998. Most of the next decade proved to be disappointing for Limerick and for O'Brien. A victory over Cork in the Munster Championship in 2001 was Limerick's last provincial win until a defeat of Tipperary following a three-game saga in 2007. O'Brien played in that year's Munster final, however, victory went to Waterford on that occasion. He and eleven other teammates were cut in October 2009, ending a twelve-year career with the team.
