= 2007 Munster Senior Hurling Championship final =

- Event: 2007 Munster Senior Hurling Championship
Waterford	Limerick
3-17	1-14
- Date: 8 July 2007
- Venue: Semple Stadium, Thurles
- Man of the Match: Dan Shanahan (Waterford)
- Referee: Séamus Roche (Tipperary)
- Attendance: 48,700

The 2007 Munster Senior Hurling Championship final was a hurling match played on 8 July 2007 at Semple Stadium, Thurles, County Tipperary. It was contested by Limerick and Waterford. Waterford claimed their third Munster Championship of the decade, beating Limerick on a scoreline of 3-17 to 1-14, a 9-point winning margin. Overall, this was Waterford's eighth Munster Senior Hurling Championship.

== Match ==
=== Details ===
8 July
Munster Final

Waterford	3-17 - 1-14	Limerick
D. Shanahan 3-3; E. Kelly 0-4 (2f); J. Mullane 0-3; S. Molumphy 0-2; P. Flynn 0-2 (1f); S. Prendergast 0-1; K. McGrath 0-1 (1f); E McGrath 0-1	(Report)	B. Begley 1-2; M. Fitzgerald 0-3; A. O'Shaughnessy 0-3 (2 '65's, 1f); K. Tobin 0-2; D. O'Grady 0-1; P. Tobin 0-1; O. Moran 0-1; M. O'Brien 0-1

Semple Stadium, Thurles
Attendance: 48,700
Referee: Séamus Roche (Tipperary)

Waterford	Limerick

WATERFORD GAA:
1	Clinton Hennessy
2	Aidan Kearney
3	Kevin Moran		(substituted off) 56'
4	Eoin Murphy
5	Tony Browne
6	Declan Prendergast
7	Ken McGrath
8	Michael Walsh (c)
9	Stephen Molumphy
10	Seamus Prendergast
11	Dan Shanahan
12	Paul Flynn
13	John Mullane
14	Eoin Kelly	(yellow card) 35+3'
15	Jack Kennedy	(yellow card) 53'	(substituted off) 61'
Substitutes:
16	Brian O'Leary
17	James Murray		(substituted on) 56'
18	Bryan Phelan
19	Tom Feeney
20	Eoin McGrath		(substituted on) 61'
21	Dave Bennett
22	Denis Coffey
23	Shane O'Sullivan
24	Richie Foley
25	Kenny Stafford
26	Jamie Nagle
27	Nicky Jacob
28	John Hartley
29	Shane Walsh
30	Conor Carey
Manager:
Justin McCarthy

LIMERICK GAA:
1	Brian Murray
2	Mark O'Riordan	(yellow card) 46'
3	Stephen Lucey
4	Seamus Hickey
5	Peter Lawlor
6	Brian Geary
7	Mark Foley
8	Dónal O'Grady (c)
9	Mike O'Brien		(substituted off) 64'
10	Niall Moran		(substituted off) 44'
11	Ollie Moran
12	Michael Fitzgerald	(yellow card) 53'
13	Andrew O'Shaughnessy
14	Brian Begley
15	Barry Foley		(substituted off) 55'
Substitutes:
16	David Bulfin
17	Hugh Flavin
18	Eoin Foley
19	Wayne McNamara
20	James O'Brien
21	Maurice O'Brien
22	Seán O'Connor
23	Paudie O'Dwyer		(substituted on) 64'
24	Gavin O'Mahony
25	Damien Reale
26	Paudie Ryan
27	Donie Ryan
28	Donnacha Ryan
29	Kevin Tobin		(substituted on) 44'
30	Pat Tobin		(substituted on) 55'
Manager:
Richie Bennis

Man of the Match:
Dan Shanahan

Linesmen:
Diarmuid Kirwan (Cork)
Anthony Stapleton (Laois)

Sideline Official
Joe Kelly (Wexford)

Umpires
P. J. Condon
Tommy Lonergan
Peter Moore
Gerry Hennerby
