= 1980 in Ireland =

- Centuries: 18th; 19th; 20th; 21st
- Decades: 1960s; 1970s; 1980s; 1990s; 2000s
- See also: 1980 in Northern Ireland; Other events of 1980; List of years in Ireland

Events from the year 1980 in Ireland.

== Incumbents ==
- President: Patrick Hillery
- Taoiseach: Charles Haughey (FF)
- Tánaiste: George Colley (FF)
- Minister for Finance:
  - Michael O'Kennedy (FF) (until 16 December 1980)
  - Gene Fitzgerald (FF) (from 16 December 1980)
- Chief Justice: Tom O'Higgins
- Dáil: 21st
- Seanad: 14th

== Events ==
=== January ===
- January – Jorge Bergoglio, the future Pope Francis, arrived in Ireland for three months to learn English at Milltown College in Milltown, Dublin.
- 9 January – Taoiseach Charles Haughey addressed the nation on television on the matter of worsening public finances.
- 31 January – A new £20 note was introduced bearing an image of the poet W. B. Yeats.

=== February ===
- 13 February – The first automated teller machine (ATM) in Ireland was launched, the Bank of Ireland Pass machine.
- 17 February – The eighth century Derrynaflan Hoard, including the Derrynaflan Chalice, was discovered in a bog in Lurgoe, County Tipperary.

=== March ===
- 24 March – The first dedicated bus lane in Dublin was opened by the CIÉ bus company on Parliament Street. The 250 metre contraflow lane allowed buses and emergency service vehicles to travel in the opposite direction to other traffic.

=== April ===
- 19 April – Johnny Logan won the Eurovision Song Contest for Ireland with the song "What's Another Year".

=== August ===
- 1 August – Eighteen people died in the Buttevant Rail Disaster.
- 8 August – Ten people died in the Central Hotel fire in Bundoran, County Donegal.
- 15 August – The first section of the Wicklow Way – from Marlay Park to Luggala – was opened by Jim Tunney TD, Minister of State for Education.
- August – Urney Chocolates factory in Tallaght, once the largest chocolate factory in Europe, closes.

=== September ===
- 1 September – China's first Ambassador to Ireland, Madame Gong Pusheng, arrived in Dublin.

=== October ===
- 6 October – Justice Mella Carroll was the first woman to reach the position of High Court Judge.
- 27 October – Over 2,000 people took part in the first Dublin Marathon.

=== November ===
- 1 November – The Health (Family Planning) Act 1979 came into operation, permitting the provision of contraceptives by prescription.
- 2 November – The first edition of the Sunday Tribune newspaper went on sale.
- 11 November – The National Institute for Higher Education, Dublin admitted its first 200 students to the college.

=== December ===
- 8 December – Taoiseach Charles Haughey met with the British prime minister Margaret Thatcher at Dublin Castle. It was the first visit by a British prime minister since Irish Independence.
- 19 December – Former Taoiseach Jack Lynch was conferred with the freedom of his native city, Cork.

== Arts and literature ==
- 23 September – Field Day Theatre Company presented its first production, the première of Brian Friel's Translations at the Guildhall, Derry.
- Eavan Boland's poetry In Her Own Image was published in the United Kingdom.
- Dermot Bolger's poetry The Habit of Flesh was published.
- Shaun Davey's orchestral suite for uilleann pipes The Brendan Voyage was composed.
- Seamus Heaney's Selected Poems 1965–1975 was published in the UK.
- Ron Hutchinson's The Irish Play was first performed, in London.
- Thomas Kinsella's Poems 1956–1973 was published in the UK.
- Paul Muldoon's poetry Why Brownlee Left was published in the UK.
- Tom Paulin's The Strange Museum, including "Pot Burial" and "Where Art Is a Midwife", was published in the UK.
- Bernard Farrell was awarded the Rooney Prize for Irish Literature.
- The Irish Film Board was established as a funding body.
- W. A. McCutcheon's official survey The Industrial Archaeology of Northern Ireland was published.

== Sport ==
=== Golf ===
- Carroll's Irish Open was won by Mark James (England).

== Births ==
- 11 January – Liam O'Brien, actor.
- 14 January – Clive Clarke, association footballer.
- 19 January – Kevin McHugh, association footballer.
- 31 January – Gary Doherty, association footballer.
- 1 February – Justin Kehoe, golfer.
- 6 February – Bernard Dunne, boxer.
- 28 February – Denise Gough, actress.
- 3 March – Toiréasa Ferris, Sinn Féin politician.
- 14 March – Colin Healy, association footballer.
- 15 March – Caitríona Perry, RTÉ news reporter.
- 3 April – Mairead Ronan, television presenter.
- 9 April – Jennifer Zamparelli, comedian and television presenter.
- 12 April – Brian McFadden, singer and songwriter.
- 13 April – Jason Maguire, jockey.
- 17 April – Richie Baker, association footballer.
- 29 April – Kian Egan, singer with Westlife.
- 21 May – Darragh Ryan, association footballer.
- 28 May – Mark Feehily, singer with Westlife.
- 3 June – Ciarán Walsh, visual artist.
- 5 June – Stephen Lucey, Limerick hurler.
- 6 June – Colin Moran, Gaelic footballer.
- 16 June – Richie Foran, association footballer.
- 19 June
  - Jean Carroll, Irish cricketer
  - Derek Geary, association footballer.
- 3 July – Donal O'Grady, Limerick hurler
- 8 July – Robbie Keane, association footballer.
- 23 July – Graham Canty, Cork Gaelic footballer.
- 13 August – Paul Crowley, association footballer.
- 22 August – Alan Reilly, association footballer.
- 12 September – Richie Partridge, association footballer.
- 15 September – Dean Delany, association footballer.
- 28 September – Danny O'Connor, association footballer.
- 3 October – Danny O'Donoghue, musician.
- 8 October – Tony Buckley, rugby player.
- 27 October – Peter Murphy, association footballer.
- 29 October – Derek Kavanagh, Cork Gaelic footballer.
- 14 November – James Ryall, Kilkenny hurler.
- 17 December – Conor Armstrong, cricketer.
- 22 December – Noel Hickey, Kilkenny hurler.

Full date unknown
- Brian Geary, Limerick hurler.
- Mark O'Riordan, Limerick hurler.

== Deaths ==
- 26 January – John Doherty, fiddle player (born 1900).
- 14 March – Gustavus Kelly, cricketer (born 1901).
- 2 May – Cecile O'Rahilly, scholar of the Celtic languages and writer (born 1894).
- 14 May – Christine Longford, playwright (born 1900 in England).
- 11 June – William J.E. Jessop, professor, represented Dublin University in the Seanad from 1951 to 1973.
- 25 June – James Hamilton Delargy, folklorist.
- 2 July – Tom Barry, guerrilla leader in the Irish Republican Army during the Irish War of Independence (born 1897).
- 5 July – A. J. Potter, composer (born 1918).
- 13 July – Joseph Brennan, Fianna Fáil party Teachta Dála (TD), Cabinet Minister and Ceann Comhairle of Dáil Éireann (born 1912).
- 24 August – Frederick Maurice Watson Harvey, soldier, recipient of the Victoria Cross for gallantry in 1917 at Guyencourt, France (born 1888).
- 5 September – Eric Cross, scientist.
- 21 September – Mick Gill, Galway and Dublin hurler (born 1899).
- 7 November – Frank Duff, founder of the Legion of Mary (born 1889).
- 9 November – Patrick Campbell, 3rd Baron Glenavy, journalist and author (born 1931).
- 10 November – John Moyney, soldier, recipient of the Victoria Cross for gallantry in 1917 north of Broembeek, Belgium (born 1895).
- 22 November – Norah McGuinness, artist (born 1901).
- 25 November – Joseph Sweeney, member of First Dáil representing West Donegal, (Pro Treaty) (born 1897).
- 16 December – Roddy Connolly, Labour Party TD, Seanad member, son of James Connolly (born 1901).
- 24 December – Arland Ussher, academic, essayist and translator (born 1899).
- 30 December – Patrick Hennessy, painter (born 1915).

Full date unknown
- Bill Delaney, Laois Gaelic footballer.
- Jimmy McCambridge, association footballer (born 1905).

== See also ==
- 1980 in Irish television
