= 2008 All-Ireland Senior Hurling Championship final =

2008 All-Ireland Hurling Final
- Event: 2008 All-Ireland Senior Hurling Championship
Kilkenny	Waterford
3–30	1–13
- Date: 7 September 2008
- Venue: Croke Park, Dublin
- Man of the Match: Brian Cody (Kilkenny)
- Referee: Barry Kelly (Westmeath)
- Attendance: 82,186
- Weather: Mild and sunny 16 °C (61 °F)

The 2008 All-Ireland Senior Hurling Championship Final was a hurling match played on 7 September 2008 in Croke Park, Dublin, between Kilkenny and Waterford. The match was the 121st All-Ireland Hurling Final and the culmination of the 2008 All-Ireland Senior Hurling Championship. It was the fourth time the teams played each other in the final, having played each other previously in 1957, 1959 and 1963. Kilkenny won their 31st All-Ireland Championship and in doing so overtook Cork on the roll of honour. The Kilkenny win witnessed the county doing three in a row for the first time since 1913. The match represented Waterford's sixth appearance in the All-Ireland Final and their first for 45 years since 1963. Waterford has not won the All-Ireland Championship since 1959.

== Previous championship encounters ==
This particular fixture has been infrequent in the history of the All-Ireland Senior Hurling Championship due to the provincial structure of the championship from 1888 to 1996. Kilkenny has played Waterford a total of six times in the All-Ireland Senior Hurling Championship. Kilkenny has four victories, Waterford has one and the remaining fixture ended as a draw. The last encounter between the two teams occurred in 2004 where a Henry Shefflin-inspired Kilkenny side ran out semi-final winners on a scoreline of Kilkenny 3–12, Waterford 0–18.

Year	Venue	Competition	Kilkenny score	Waterford score	Match report
1957	Croke Park, Dublin	All-Ireland Hurling Final	4–10 (22)	3–12 (21)	
1959	Croke Park, Dublin	All-Ireland Hurling Final	5-05 (20)	1–17 (20)	
1959	Croke Park, Dublin	All-Ireland Hurling Final Replay	1–10 (13)	3–12 (21)	
1963	Croke Park, Dublin	All-Ireland Hurling Final	4–17 (29)	6-08 (26)	
1998	Croke Park, Dublin	All-Ireland Hurling Semi-Final	1–11 (14)	1–10 (13)	Irish Independent
2004	Croke Park, Dublin	All-Ireland Hurling Semi-Final	3–12 (21)	0–18 (18)	Irish Independent

== Paths to final ==
=== Kilkenny ===
A programme for the 2008 final

Kilkenny's path to the All-Ireland Hurling Final turned out to be a more straight forward affair in comparison to Waterford. Kilkenny's Leinster Championship campaign started off in O'Moore Park, Portlaoise on 15 June 2008 against Offaly. The match turned out to be a very one-sided affair with Henry Shefflin scoring 11 points on his return from a long-term injury. Kilkenny eventually ran out easy winners on a scoreline of Kilkenny 2–24 Offaly 0–12. Kilkenny moved onto the Leinster Hurling Final where they would face a Wexford side who took a replay to defeat Dublin in the other semi-final. As in previous year, the Leinster Final also turned out to be a one sided affair. Wexford stuck with Kilkenny for the first half but the cats pulled away in the second half, essentially killing off Wexford's challenge with 4 goals in the second half. Kilkenny became Leinster Champions for the ninth time in ten years on a scoreline of Kilkenny 5–21 Wexford 0–17.

After the completion of the All-Ireland Qualifier Series, Cork revealed themselves to be Kilkenny's All-Ireland Semi-final opponents. The fixture was much hyped by the Irish media, in light of both teams' respective records over the past 5 years. A large crowd at Croke Park viewed an entertaining match which pitted the 2006 finalists against each other. The sides stuck with each other, point for point at the start, resulting in a score of 6 points each after 20 minutes. However, Cork went without a score for a long period of the first half resulting in Kilkenny leading by 8 points at half time. Cork opened the second half with a barrage of points, but Kilkenny held strong and ran out 9-point winners – Kilkenny 1–23 Cork 0–17. Kilkenny qualified for their eighth final in ten years.

15 June
Leinster Semi-final

Offaly	0–12 – 2–24	Kilkenny
B Carroll 0–6 (2f, 1’65'); G Healion 0–2; J Bergin 0–2; R Hanniffy 0–1; D Molloy 0–1	(Report)	H Shefflin 0–11 (9f, 1’65'); E Larkin 0–4; M Comerford 1–1; A Fogarty 1–0; M Rice 0–2; E Brennan 0–2; J Fitzpatrick 0–1; M Fennelly 0–1; R Hogan 0–1; TJ Reid 0–1

O'Moore Park, Portlaoise
Referee: J Sexton (Cork)

6 July
Leinster Final

Kilkenny	5–21 – 0–17	Wexford
H Shefflin 1–7 (1-7f); E Brennan 2–2; R Power 1–2; A Fogarty 1–1; J Fitzpatrick 0–4 (1f); E Larkin 0–3; D Lyng 0–1; M Comerford 0–1	(Report)	D Lyng 0–7 (6f, 1 sl); R Jacob 0–3; PJ Nolan 0–2; D Redmond 0–2; S Doyle 0–1; M Jacob 0–1; B Lambert 0–1

Croke Park, Dublin
Referee: B Kelly (Westmeath)

10 August
All-Ireland Semi-final

Kilkenny	1–23 – 0–17	Cork
H Shefflin 0–11 (6f); E Larkin 1–2; A Fogarty 0–5; TJ Reid 0–2; R Power 0–1; E Brennan 0–1; J Fitzpatrick 0–1	(Report)	B O'Connor 0–8 (8f); N McCarthy 0–2; T Kenny 0–2; J O'Connor 0–2; C Naughton 0–1; J Gardiner 0–1; P Cronin 0–1

Croke Park, Dublin
Referee: M Wadding (Waterford)

=== Waterford ===
Waterford started off the year with a Munster Championship first round clash with Clare at the Gaelic Grounds, Limerick on 1 June 2008. Waterford, missing a number of first team regulars such as Ken McGrath, Eoin Kelly and Eoin Murphy succumbed to a youthful Clare team on a scoreline of Waterford 0–23 Clare 2–26. Soon after the game, manager, Justin McCarthy was fired from his position by the Waterford County Board. It has been rumoured at the time that player unrest had a lot to do with the decision. The Waterford County Board acted quickly and appointed former Clare goalkeeper Davy Fitzgerald as new Waterford manager on 10 June 2008. The loss to Clare sent Waterford into the All-Ireland Qualifier Series. The first round match against Antrim saw the return of both Ken McGrath and Eoin Kelly. Davy Fitzgerald started his Waterford managerial career with the unusual decision of placing Ken McGrath at full back in order to strengthen the full back line. The decision paid off and the match turned out to be a complete mismatch, with Waterford running out winners on a scoreline of Waterford 6–18 Antrim 0–15.

Waterford were then pitted against Offaly in their Phase 4 Qualifier on 19 July 2008 at Semple Stadium, Thurles. After a stern test in the first 60 minutes, Waterford eventually pulled away towards the end winning on a scoreline of Waterford 2–18 Offaly 0–18. This resulted in Waterford reaching the All-Ireland Quarter Finals and a match-up against Leinster runners-up Wexford. This was a competitive match which toed and froed from one side to the other. However, a late barrage of points saw Waterford over the endline on a scoreline of Waterford 2–19 Wexford 3–15. The win against Wexford lead Waterford to their sixth All-Ireland Semi-Final since 1998. The opponents would be a highly fancied Tipperary, who were reigning National Hurling League and Munster champions. Waterford started a blistering page, going 0–6 to 0–0 up after 8 minutes. However Tipperary were level going in at half time. Both teams scored goals in rapid succession in the 2nd half. Waterford's nerve held, and they won by two points on a scoreline of Waterford 1–20 Tipperary 1–18. It was Waterford's first semi-final win since 1963 and brought to an end a run of 5 consecutive semi-final defeats.

1 June
Munster 1st round

Waterford	0–23 – 2–26	Clare
D Bennett 0–10 (9f); J Mullane 0–8; G Hurney 0–1; S Molumphy 0–1; S Prendergast 0–1; E McGrath 0–1; D Coffey 0–1	(Report)	M Flaherty 1–7 (3f, 2 '65'); N Gilligan 1–2; T Griffin 0–5; C Plunkett 0–3 (2f); D McMahon 0–3; C Lynch 0–2; T Carmody 0–2; P Vaughan 0–1; B Bugler 0–1

Gaelic Grounds, Limerick
Referee: D Murphy (Wexford)

5 July
Phase 2 Qualifier

Waterford	6–18 – 0–15	Antrim
E Kelly 2–3 (3f); J Mullane 2–2; E McGrath 0–5; D Shanahan 0–4; G Hurney 1–0; S Molumphy 1–0; J Nagle 0–2; P Flynn 0–1; D Bennett 0–1	(Report)	P Shiels 0–7 (5f); PJ O'Connell 0–2; K Stewart 0–2; C Herron 0–1; M Herron 0–1; B Quinn 0–1; S McNaughton 0–1

Walsh Park, Waterford
Referee: M Haverty (Galway)

19 July
Phase 4 Qualifier

Waterford	2–18 – 0–18	Offaly
E Kelly 2–13; J Mullane 0–2; E McGrath 0–1; S Prendergast 0–1; S Molumphy 0–1	(Report)	B Carroll 0–9; B Murphy 0–2; G Hannify 0–2; D Franks 0–1; P Cleary 0–1; S Dooley 0–1; D Molly 0–1; J Bergin 0–1

Semple Stadium, Thurles
Referee: M Haverty (Galway)

27 July
All-Ireland Quarter-final

Wexford	3–15 – 2–19	Waterford
S Doyle 2–1; D Lyng 0–5 (5f); W Doran 1–1; R Jacob 0–3 (1f); D Redmond 0–2; S Nolan 0–1; E Quigley 0–1; D Fitzhenry 0–1 (1 pen)	(Report)	E Kelly 1–8 (1-6f, 1 '65'); E McGrath 0–4; D Shanahan 1–1; J Mullane 0–3; J Nagle 0–1; S Prendergast 0–1; S Molumphy 0–1

Semple Stadium, Thurles
Referee: J Sexton (Cork)

17 August
All-Ireland Semi-final

Tipperary	1–18 – 1–20	Waterford
E Kelly 0–8 (6f); S Callinan 1–3; S McGrath 0–3; C O’Mahony 0–1 (1f); L Corbett 0–1; P Kerwick 0–1; S Maher 0–1	(Report)	E Kelly 1–10 (8f); J Mullane 0–3; E McGrath 0–2; S Molumphy 0–2; M Walsh 0–2; J Kennedy 0–1

Croke Park, Dublin
Referee: D Kirwan (Cork)

== Television and Radio Coverage ==
Country	Broadcaster	Channel	Start of coverage
Australia	Setanta Sports	Setanta Sports	21:45 CDT
Canada	Setanta Sports	Setanta Premium	08:30 ET
Ireland	RTÉ	RTÉ Two	12:30 IST
United Kingdom	Setanta Sports	Setanta Sports 1	13:30 BST
USA	Setanta Sports	Setanta Premium	08:30 ET

As with previous years, the Irish state broadcaster, Radio Telefís Éireann will provide both television and radio coverage for the event. As well as showing the senior game, RTÉ will also provide coverage of the All-Ireland Minor Hurling Championship Final on the day along with a suitable build up to the game in the preceding days. Irish satellite sports channel, Setanta Sports will provide coverage on the day for Australia, Canada, United Kingdom and United States of America. The British Broadcasting Corporation provides coverage in Northern Ireland, although viewers may also be able to watch the RTÉ coverage through different mediums. Ger Canning will commentate on RTÉ's television coverage. It was Canning's twenty third time doing the live match commentary for RTÉ.

Mícheál Ó Muircheartaigh provide commentary for RTÉ radio with the match being broadcast on both FM and LW. Radio coverage was also provided by numerous Irish local radio stations, most notably, WLR FM and KCLR 96FM.

== Match details ==
7 September 2008
15:30 UTC+1

Kilkenny GAA	3–30 – 1–13	Waterford GAA
E Brennan 2–4; H Shefflin 0–8 (5f, 1 '65'); E Larkin 1–4; TJ Reid 0–4; A Fogarty 0–3; D Lyng 0–3; R Power 0–2; J Fitzpatrick 0–2	(Report)	E Kelly 1–9 (1-9f); J Mullane 0–3; D Bennett 0–1

Croke Park, Dublin
Attendance: 82,186
Referee: Barry Kelly (Westmeath)

Kilkenny GAA	Waterford GAA

KILKENNY GAA:
1	P. J. Ryan		(substituted off) 61'
2	Michael Kavanagh
3	Noel Hickey
4	Jackie Tyrell
5	Tommy Walsh	(yellow card) 44'
6	Brian Hogan
7	J. J. Delaney
8	Cha Fitzpatrick (c)
9	Derek Lyng
10	Martin Comerford		(substituted off) 43'
11	Richie Power
12	Eoin Larkin
13	Eddie Brennan
14	Henry Shefflin
15	Aidan Fogarty
Substitutes:
16	James McGarry		(substituted on) 61'
17	John Dalton
18	P. J. Delaney
19	James Ryall
20	John Tennyson
21	Canice Hickey
22	Donnacha Cody
23	Sean Cummins
24	Michael Fennelly
25	Richie Mullally
26	Michael Rice
27	Willie O'Dwyer
28	T. J. Reid		(substituted on) 43'
29	Richie Hogan
30	Eoin Reid
Manager:
Brian Cody

WATERFORD GAA:
1	Clinton Hennessy
2	Eoin Murphy
3	Declan Prendergast		(substituted off) 64'
4	Aidan Kearney
5	Tony Browne
6	Ken McGrath
7	Kevin Moran	(yellow card) 65'
8	Michael Walsh (c)
9	Jamie Nagle		(substituted off) 35'
10	Dan Shanahan		(substituted off) 64'
11	Seamus Prendergast		(substituted off) 35'
12	Stephen Molumphy
13	Eoin McGrath	(yellow card) 31'	(substituted off) 52'
14	Eoin Kelly
15	John Mullane	(yellow card) 71'
Substitutes:
16	Adrian Power
17	Jack Kennedy		(substituted on) 35'
18	Paul Flynn		(substituted on) 52'
19	Shane O'Sullivan	(yellow card) 40'	(substituted on) 35'
20	Gary Hurney
21	Dave Bennett		(substituted on) 64'
22	Richie Foley
23	Bryan Phelan
24	James Murray
25	Tom Feeney		(substituted on) 64'
26	Wayne Hutchinson
27	Shane Walsh
28	Pat Fitzgerald
29	Pa Kearney
30	Denis Coffey
Manager:
Davy Fitzgerald

Man of the Match:
Brian Cody

Linesmen:
John Sexton (Cork)
Tommy McIntyre (Antrim)

Sideline Official
Pat Green (Galway)

Umpires
Seamus O'Brien (Westmeath)
Michael Coyle (Westmeath)
Noel Nugent (Westmeath)
Anthony Gavin (Westmeath)
