= List of Limerick senior hurling team captains =

This article lists players who have captained the Limerick county hurling team in the Munster Senior Hurling Championship and the All-Ireland Senior Hurling Championship.

== List of captains ==
Year	Player	Club	National titles	Provincial titles
1927	Micky Cross	Claughaun		
1928	Willie Gleeson	Fedamore		
1929	Bob McConkey	Young Irelands		
1930				
1931	Bob McConkey	Young Irelands		
1932	Timmy Ryan	Ahane		
1933	Micky Fitzgibbon	Young Irelands		Munster Hurling Final winning captain
1934	Timmy Ryan	Ahane	All-Ireland Hurling Final winning captain	Munster Hurling Final winning captain
1935	Timmy Ryan	Ahane		Munster Hurling Final winning captain
1936	Mick Mackey	Ahane	All-Ireland Hurling Final winning captain	Munster Hurling Final winning captain
1937	Mick Mackey	Ahane		
1938	Mick Mackey	Ahane		
1939	Mick Mackey	Ahane		
1940	Mick Mackey	Ahane	All-Ireland Hurling Final winning captain	Munster Hurling Final winning captain
1941	Jim Roche	Croom		
1942		Croom		
1943		Ahane		
1944	Mick Mackey	Ahane		
1945	Mick Mackey	Ahane		
1946	Mick Mackey	Ahane		
1947		Ahane		
1948	Jackie Power	Ahane		
1949	Seán Herbert	Ahane		
1950				
1951	Dick Stokes	Pallasgreen		
1952	Dick Stokes	Pallasgreen		
1953				
1954				
1955	Liam Ryan	Cappamore		Munster Hurling Final winning captain
1956	Tommy Casey			
1957	Séamus Ryan	Cappamore		
1958	Mick Tynan	Claughaun		
1959	Jim Keogh	Claughaun		
1960	Séamus Ryan	Cappamore		
1961				
1962				
1963	Kevin Long	Feenagh-Kilmeedy		
1964	Kevin Long	Feenagh-Kilmeedy		
1965	Johnny Hayes	Cappamore		
1966	Phil Bennis	Patrickswell		
1967	Phil Bennis	Patrickswell		
1968	Mossie Dowling	Kilmallock		
1969	Éamonn Cregan	Claughaun		
1970	Phil Bennis	Patrickswell		
1971	Tony O'Brien	Patrickswell		
1972	Jim Hogan	Claughaun		
1973	Éamonn Grimes	south Liberties	All-Ireland Hurling Final winning captain	Munster Hurling Final winning captain
1974	Seán Foley	Patrickswell		Munster Hurling Final winning captain
1975	Éamonn Grimes	South Liberties		
1976	Paddy Kelly	Kilmallock		
1977	Éamonn Grimes	South Liberties		
1978	Seán Foley	Patrickswell		
1979	Pat Hartigan	South Liberties		
1980	Seán Foley	Patrickswell		Munster Hurling Final winning captain
1981	Paudie Fitzmaurice	Killeedy		Munster Hurling Final winning captain
1982	Joe McKenna	South Liberties		
1983	Leonard Enright	Patrickswell		
1984	Leonard Enright	Patrickswell		
1985	Leonard Enright	Patrickswell		
1986	Paddy Kelly	Kilmallock		
1987	Danny Fitzgerald	Claughaun		
1988	Leonard Enright	Patrickswell		
1989	Gary Kirby	Patrickswell		
1990	Terence Kenny	Ballybrown		
1991	Anthony Carmody	Patrickswell		
1992	Joe O'Connor	Ballybrown		
1993	Mike Houlihan	Kilmallock		
1994	Gary Kirby	Patrickswell		Munster Hurling Final winning captain
1995	Mike Houlihan	Kilmallock		
1996	Ciarán Carey	Patrickswell		Munster Hurling Final winning captain
1997	Gary Kirby	Patrickswell		
1998	Ciarán Carey	Patrickswell		
1999	Ollie Moran	Ahane		
2000	Ollie Moran	Ahane		
2001	Barry Foley	Patrickswell		
2002	Mark Foley	Adare		
2003	Mark Foley	Adare		
2004	Ciarán Carey	Patrickswell		
	T.J. Ryan	Garryspillane		
2005	Ollie Moran	Ahane		
2006	T.J. Ryan	Garryspillane		
	Damian Reale	Hospital-Herbertstown		
2007	James O'Brien	Bruree		
2008	Mark Foley	Adare		
2009	Mark Foley	Adare		
2010	Bryan O'Sullivan	Kilmallock		
2011	Gavin O'Mahony	Kilmallock		
2012	David Breen	Na Piarsaigh		
2013	Donal O'Grady	Granagh-Ballingarry		Munster Hurling Final winning captain
2014	Donal O'Grady	Granagh-Ballingarry		
2015	Donal O'Grady	Granagh-Ballingarry		
2016	Nickie Quaid	Effin		
2017	James Ryan	Garryspillane		
2018	Declan Hannon	Adare	All-Ireland Hurling Final winning captain	
2019	Declan Hannon	Adare		Munster Hurling Final winning captain
2020	Declan Hannon	Adare	All-Ireland Hurling Final winning captain	Munster Hurling Final winning captain
2021	Declan Hannon	Adare	All-Ireland Hurling Final winning captain	Munster Hurling Final winning captain
2022	Declan Hannon	Adare	All-Ireland Hurling Final winning captain	Munster Hurling Final winning captain
2023	Cian Lynch	Patrickswell	All-Ireland Hurling Final winning captain	Munster Hurling Final winning captain
2024	Declan Hannon	Adare		Munster Hurling Final winning captain
2025	Cian Lynch	Patrickswell		
2026				
