= Jim Roche =

Jim Roche may refer to:

- Jim Roche (artist), American artist, flourishing since the 1970s
- Jim Roche (hurler) (1909-1980), Irish hurler
- Jimmy Joe Roche, American visual artist and underground filmmaker, flourishing since the 1990s

== See also ==
- James Roche (disambiguation)
