= Éamonn Grimes =

Irish hurler

Personal information
- Native name: Éamonn Ó Greacháin (Irish)
- Born: 1947 (age 78–79) Donoughmore, County Limerick, Ireland
- Occupation: Sales representative
- Height: 5 ft 8 in (173 cm)

Sport
- Sport: Hurling
- Position: Midfield
Club
- Years: Club
- South Liberties
Club titles
- Limerick titles: 4
Inter-county
Years	County	Apps (scores)
1966–1981	Limerick	30 (3-27)
Inter-county titles
- Munster titles: 2
- All-Irelands: 1
- NHL: 1
- All Stars: 2

Éamonn Grimes (born 1947) is an Irish retired hurler who played as a midfielder for the Limerick senior team.

Grimes joined the team during the 1966 championship and was a regular member of the starting fifteen until his retirement after the 1981 championship. During that time he won one All-Ireland medal, four Munster medals (two as a substitute), one National Hurling League medal and two All-Star awards. An All-Ireland runner-up on two occasions, Grimes captained the team to the All-Ireland title in 1973.

At club level Grimes was a four-time county club championship medalist with South Liberties.

== Playing career ==
=== Colleges ===
During his secondary schooling at CBS Sexton Street, Grimes became a member of the college senior hurling team.

In 1964 he won his first Harty Cup medal following a defeat of St. Flannan's College. The subsequent All-Ireland decider saw the Limerick side face St. Peter's College, Wexford. A 6–7 to 4–5 victory gave Grimes an All-Ireland medal.

Grimes added a second Harty Cup medal the following year, before losing to St. Kieran's College in the All-Ireland decider on a score line of 6–9 to 6–1.

In his final year with the school, Grimes won a third successive Harty Cup medal as captain of the side, following a defeat of Thurles CBS. The subsequent All-Ireland decider against St. Mary's of Galway was a rout, with a large 8–9 to 2–2 victory giving Grimes a second All-Ireland medal.

=== Club ===
Grimes played his club hurling, along with his brothers Lar, John, Mikey and Joe, with the South Liberties GAA Club in Limerick.

After playing in two losing county finals, Grimes was at midfield again when South Liberties faced Patrickswell in 1972. A 4–8 to 1–5 victory gave Grimes a Limerick Senior Hurling Championship medal.

Four years later Grimes added a second championship medal to his collection following a 2–9 to 2–6 defeat of Killeedy.

South Liberties surrendered their title the following year, but they reached the final again in 1978. Grimes won a third championship medal following a 2–9 to 2–5 defeat of Bruree.

In 1981 South Liberties defeated Kilmallock by 4–7 to 2–11, giving Grimes a fourth championship medal.

Grimes retired from club hurling in 1986.

=== Minor and under-21 ===
Grimes first came to prominence on the inter-county scene as a member of the Limerick minor hurling team in 1963. He was an unused substitute that year when Limerick defeated Tipperary by 4–12 to 5–4 to take the Munster Minor Hurling Championship crown. The subsequent All-Ireland decider saw Limerick face Wexford. Grimes was introduced as a substitute, but Wexford won a high-scoring game by 6–12 to 5–9.

Two years later Grimes was in his final year in the grade and was a regular member of the starting fifteen. A 5–5 to 3–9 defeat of Tipperary gave him his first Munster medal on the field of play. Limerick were defeated by 4–10 to 2–7 by Dublin in the subsequent All-Ireland decider.

Grimes subsequently joined the Limerick under-21 hurling team; however, he had little success in this grade.

=== Senior ===
Grimes subsequently joined the Limerick senior team, making his debut the day before he was due to sit his Leaving Certificate in a Munster quarter-final defeat of Tipperary.

In 1971 Limerick hurling bounced back after over a decade in the doldrums. A narrow 3–12 to 3–11 defeat of Tipperary gave Grimes a National Hurling League medal.

Two years later Grimes was appointed captain of the team as Limerick finally made the provincial breakthrough. A last-minute free by Richie Bennis secured a 6–7 to 2–18 defeat of Tipperary in the provincial decider and a first Munster medal for Grimes. It was Limerick's first provincial championship since 1955. Grimes later led his team to Croke Park for an All-Ireland showdown with reigning champions and injury-ravaged Kilkenny. A Mossie Dowling goal eight minutes after half-time, together with a series of scores by Richie Bennis led Limerick to a 1–21 to 1–14 victory. This gave Grimes an All-Ireland Senior Hurling Championship medal, and he had the honour of collecting the Liam MacCarthy Cup on behalf of the team. Following the conclusion of the championship he was presented with his first All-Star award, as well as being named Texaco Hurler of the Year.

In 1974 Limerick maintained their provincial dominance. Grimes captured a second Munster medal following a 6–14 to 3–9 win over Clare. This victory allowed Grimes's side advance directly to the All-Ireland final where Kilkenny provided the opposition once again. While Kilkenny were back to full strength, Limerick went into an early lead. However, this was diminished as Pat Delaney, Eddie Keher and Mick Brennan scored goals. Limerick lost the game by 3–19 to 1–13.

Limerick failed to win a third provincial championship, but Grimes won a second All-Star award in 1975.

By 1980 Grimes had been dropped from the starting fifteen. He was a non-playing substitute as Limerick won the Munster final by 2–14 to 2–10 that year and denied Cork a record-breaking sixth successive title. The subsequent All-Ireland decider pitted Limerick against Galway; however, Grimes started the game outside of the starting fifteen once again. He was introduced to the field of play during the game. Though Éamonn Cregan scored 2–7 for Limerick, Galway went on to win the game by 2–15 to 3–9.

Limerick retained their provincial crown in 1981 following a 3–12 to 2–9 defeat of Clare, but Grimes was still a non-playing substitute. His career drew to an end when eventual champions Offaly defeated Limerick in the subsequent All-Ireland semi-final.

=== Inter-provincial ===
Grimes was also selected for Munster in the inter-provincial series of games. He made his debut with the province in 1972 and was a regular at various intervals until his retirement in 1978. During that time he won two Railway Cup medals as a non-playing substitute in 1976 and 1978.

== Personal life ==
Grimes lives in Limerick, with his wife, Helen. They married in the 1970s and have two children.

After completing his education Grimes later worked as a sales representative for Beamish and Crawford.

His name re-appeared in sports reports many years later when his friend and fellow member and benefactor of the South Liberties club, J.P. McManus, named his successful racehorse "Grimes" in his honour.

== Honours ==
=== Team ===
Sexton Street CBS

- All-Ireland Senior Colleges' Hurling Championship (2): 1964, 1966 (c)
- Munster Senior Colleges' Hurling Championship (3): 1964, 1965, 1966 (c)

South Liberties

- Limerick Senior Club Hurling Championship (4): 1972, 1976, 1978, 1981

Limerick

- All-Ireland Senior Hurling Championship (1): 1973 (c)
- Munster Senior Hurling Championship (4): 1973 (c), 1974, 1980 (sub), 1981 (sub)
- National Hurling League (1): 1970–71
- Munster Minor Hurling Championship (2): 1963 (sub), 1965

Munster

- Railway Cup (4): 1976 (sub), 1978 (sub)

=== Individual ===
Awards

- Texaco Hurler of the Year (1): 1973
- All-Star Awards (2): 1974, 1975

Sporting positions
Preceded by Jim Hogan	Limerick Senior Hurling Captain; 1973	Succeeded by Seán Foley
Preceded by Seán Foley	Limerick Senior Hurling Captain; 1975	Succeeded by Paddy Kelly
Achievements
Preceded by Noel Skehan (Kilkenny)	All-Ireland Senior Hurling Final winning captain 1973	Succeeded by Nicky Orr (Kilkenny)
Awards
Preceded by Eddie Keher (Kilkenny)	Texaco Hurler of the Year; 1973	Succeeded by Ger Henderson (Kilkenny)
