= Jackie O'Connell =

Irish hurler

Personal information
- Native name: Seán Cathal Ó Conaill (Irish)
- Nickname: Jackie
- Born: 22 January 1912 Banogue, County Limerick, Ireland
- Died: 16 October 1997 (aged 85) Ballinacurra, Limerick, Ireland
- Occupation: Employment exchange manager

Sport
- Sport: Hurling
- Position: Centre-forward
Club
- Years: Club
- Croom
Club titles
- Limerick titles: 0
Inter-county
- Years: County
- 1930-1932 1933-1935: Waterford; Limerick
Inter-county titles
- Munster titles: 1
- All-Irelands: 1
- NHL: 1

John Charles O'Connell (26 January 1912 – 16 October 1997) was an Irish hurler who played as a centre-forward for the Limerick senior team.

Born in Banogue, County Limerick, O'Connell first played competitive hurling during his schooling at Rockwell College. He arrived on the inter-county scene at the age of eighteen when he first linked up with the Waterford senior and junior teams. He made his debut for Limerick during the 1933-34 league. O'Connell immediately became a regular member of the starting fifteen and won one All-Ireland medal, one Munster medal and one National Hurling League medal. He was an All-Ireland runner-up on one occasion.

At club level O'Connell was a two-time divisional championship medallist with Croom.

O'Connell's retirement came following the conclusion of the 1935 championship.

In retirement from playing O'Connell became involved in the administrative affairs of the Limerick County Board. He served as secretary for 27 years before later being elected chairman and eventually life president.

== Playing career ==
=== College ===
During his tenure at Rockwell College O'Connell was heavily involved in rugby union and rowing, however, he excelled as captain of the senior hurling team. In 1930 he won a Harty Cup medal following an 8-2 to 1-1 trouncing of Mount Sion.

=== Inter-county ===
During his studies in Waterford O'Connell lined out for the Déise during several league campaigns.

O'Connell joined the Limerick panel during the team's successful league campaign and made his debut in the subsequent championship. That campaign saw Limerick reach the decider, where they played Waterford for the second year in-a-row. The result was much the same, with O'Connell collecting a second Munster medal following a 4-8 to 2-5 victory. The All-Ireland final on 2 September 1934 was a special occasion as it was the golden jubilee final of the Gaelic Athletic Association. Dublin were the opponents and a close game developed. After leading by a point at the interval, Limerick went five clear with time running out. Dublin fought their way back to secure a remarkable draw. The replay on 30 September turned out to be an even closer affair, with both sides level with two minutes to go. Points from Mick Mackey and O'Connell and a remarkable four goals from Dave Clohessy secured a 5-2 to 2-6 victory for Limerick. The win gave O'Connell an All-Ireland medal.

In 1935 O'Connell added a National Hurling League medal to his collection, as Limerick retained their title in a straightforward league format. He missed Limerick's subsequent provincial triumph, however, he was back on the starting fifteen as Kilkenny provided the opposition in the subsequent All-Ireland final on 1 September 1935. Limerick were the red-hot favourites as a record crowd of over 46,000 turned up to watch a hurling classic. In spite of rain falling throughout the entire game both sides served up a great game. At the beginning of the second-half Lory Meagher sent over a huge point from midfield giving Kilkenny a lead which they would not surrender. The game ended in controversial circumstances for Mick Mackey when Limerick were awarded a close-in free to level the game. Jack Keane issued an instruction from the sideline that Timmy Ryan, the team captain, was to take the free and put the sliotar over the bar for the equalising point. As he lined up to take it, Mackey pushed him aside and took the free himself. The shot dropped short and into the waiting hands of the Kilkenny goalkeeper and was cleared. The game ended shortly after with Kilkenny triumphing by 2-5 to 2-4.

A recurring knee injury brought O'Connell's career to a premature end in 1936.

== Biography ==
The son of a farmer and a schoolteacher, O'Connell was born in Banogue just outside Croom, County Limerick. He was educated at the local national school before later earning a scholarship to Rockwell College. O'Connell subsequently began his teacher training at De La Salle College in Waterford, however, ill health forced him to abandon his studies after two years. On returning to Limerick he joined the civil service and gave over forty years of service to the Department of Social Welfare. He was manager of the employment exchange on his retirement in 1976.

O'Connell married his wife Eileen in 1938 and the couple had seven children: Breda, Kathleen, Brendan, Sheila, Patricia, Marie and Margaret.

After retiring from the civil service, O'Connell and his wife spent much of their time in Kilkee, County Clare. He died on 16 October 1997 at his home in Ballinacurra. At the time of his death he was the last surviving member of Limerick's 1934 All-Ireland-winning team.

== Honours ==
=== Player ===
Rockwell College

- Dr. Harty Cup (1): 1930 (c)

Limerick

- All-Ireland Senior Hurling Championship (1): 1934
- Munster Senior Hurling Championship (1): 1934
- National Hurling League (1): 1934-35
