= Peter Cregan =

Irish hurler (1918–2004)

Personal information
- Native name: Peadar Ó Críagáin (Irish)
- Born: 13 May 1918 Croom, County Limerick, Ireland
- Died: 12 August 2004 (aged 86) Fedamore, County Limerick, Ireland
- Height: 5 ft 9 in (175 cm)

Sport
- Sport: Hurling
- Position: Left wing-back
Club
- Years: Club
- Croom
Club titles
- Limerick titles: 2
Inter-county
- Years: County
- 1937–1947: Limerick
Inter-county titles
- Munster titles: 1
- All-Irelands: 1
- NHL: 1

Peter Cregan (13 May 1918 – 12 August 2004) was an Irish hurler who played as a goalkeeper for the Limerick senior team.

Born in Croom, County Limerick, Cregan first appeared on the inter-county scene at the age of sixteen with the Limerick minor team. He made his senior debut during the 1937 championship. Cregan immediately became a regular member of the starting fifteen and won one All-Ireland medals, one Munster medal and one National Hurling League medal.

As a member of the Munster inter-provincial team on a number of occasions, Cregan won four Railway Cup medals. At club level he was twice a championship medallist with Croom.

Cregan retired before to the start of the 1947 championship.
