= James Roche =

James Roche may refer to:

- James Roche (General Motors) (1906–2004), chairman and CEO of General Motors
- James G. Roche (1939–2026), 20th Secretary of the United States Air Force
- James Roche, 3rd Baron Fermoy (1852–1920), Irish peer and politician
- James Jeffrey Roche (1847–1908), Irish-American poet, journalist and diplomat
- James Roche (bishop) (1870–1956), Irish Roman Catholic bishop
- Jim Roche (hurler) (James Roche, 1909–1980), Irish hurler
- James Roche, member of the Australian pop music group Bachelor Girl
- James Roche (1770–1853), Irish wine merchant, patron of the Royal Cork Institution

== See also ==
- Jim Roche (disambiguation)
- Jimmy Joe Roche, American visual artist and underground filmmaker, flourishing since the 1990s
