= Stephen Molumphy =

Irish hurler and selector

Personal information
- Native name: Stiofáin Ó Maolanfaidh (Irish)
- Nickname: Rambo/Hannibal
- Born: 11 January 1984 (age 42) Waterford, Ireland
- Occupation: Irish military Officer
- Height: 1.78 m (5 ft 10 in)

Sport
- Sport: Hurling
- Position: Left Half Forward
Club
- Years: Club
- 2001-: Ballyduff Upper
Club titles
- Waterford titles: 1 Senior title, 2x Intermediate A titles
College(s)
- Years: College
- NUI Galway; Maynooth University
College titles
- Fitzgibbon titles: 0 European = 1 European title 2025
Inter-county*
Years	County	Apps (scores)
2006-2014	Waterford	31 (3-26)
Inter-county titles
- Munster titles: 2
- All-Irelands: 0
- NHL: 1
- All Stars: 1
- *Inter County team apps and scores correct as of 12:56, 24 July 2019.

Stephen Molumphy (born 11 January 1984) is an Irish former hurler with Waterford senior hurling team, and since July 2026, the current manager of the Waterford senior hurling team. He played for Waterford Senior Championship club Ballyduff Upper and was a member of the Waterford senior hurling team for nine seasons, during which time he usually lined out in midfield or as a left wing-forward.

== Playing career ==
=== St. Colman's College ===
Molumphy first came to prominence as a hurler with St. Colman's College in Fermoy. He played in every grade of hurling and enjoyed success by winning a Dean Ryan Cup medal before eventually joining the college's senior hurling team.

On 25 March 2001, Molumphy was part of the team when St. Colman's College defeated St. Flannan's College from Ennis by 2–12 to 0–15 to win the Harty Cup. When St. Colman's College faced Gort Community School in the All-Ireland final on 5 May 2001, Molumphy played at corner forward and ended the game with a winners' medal following the 2–10 to 2–07 victory.

Molumphy became one of the leaders of the starting fifteen during the 2002 Harty Cup. On 23 March 2002, he scored a point from left wing-forward when St. Colman's College defeated Our Lady's Secondary School from Templemore by 2–18 to 0–06 to retain the Harty Cup title. Molumphy was selected at left wing-forward for the All-Ireland final against St. Kieran's College from Kilkenny on 28 April 2002. He scored a point from play and claimed a second successive All-Ireland medal after an 0–11 to 2–04 victory.

=== NUI Galway ===
During his studies at NUI Galway, Molumphy quickly became a member of the senior hurling team. On 10 March 2007, he lined out at midfield when NUI Galway suffered a 0–13 to 1–07 defeat by the Limerick Institute of Technology in the Fitzgibbon Cup final.

=== Ballyduff Upper ===
Molumphy joined the Ballyduff Upper club at a young age and played in all grades at juvenile and underage levels before eventually joining the club's top adult team in the Waterford Senior Championship. He is the only club player to captain 3 teams at the highest grade to hurling titles, the U13 A County title 1997, U21 A Western title 2005 and Senior hurling title 2007.

On 6 November 2005, Molumphy lined out at midfield when Ballyduff Upper faced Passage in the Waterford Intermediate Championship final in the 1–13 apiece draw. Molumphy was again dominant at midfield for the replay on 12 November 2005 and ended the game with a winners' medal following the 1–15 to 0–08 victory.

Molumphy was appointed captain of the Ballyduff Upper senior team at the start of the 2006 season until 2010 season. On 4 November 2007, he captained the team to the Waterford Senior Championship title after a 1–18 to 1–14 defeat of Ballygunner in the final. This match is famous for five Molumphy brothers (Patrick, Michael, Thomas, Edward and Stephen Molumphy) being on the same team that won a senior county hurling title in Waterford.

=== Tipperary ===
During a spell in Boston during the summer of 2015, Molumphy joined the Tipperary club. On 30 August 2015, he won a Boston Championship medal when he lined out at wing-back in a 2–25 to 0–16 defeat of Fr. Tom Burke's.

=== Eire Óg, Hertfordshire, Oxford, UK ===
In 2021, Molumphy joined the Eire Óg Oxford Gaelic Football team and the Hertfordshire hurling team. He competed in both grades.

=== Waterford ===
==== Minor and under-21 ====
Molumphy first played for Waterford as a 16-year-old when he lined out for the minor team during the 2001 Munster Championship. He made his first appearance for the team on 25 April 2001 when he came on as a substitute at left wing-forward in a 1–15 to 0–07 first round defeat by Cork.

Molumphy was once again eligible for the minor grade in 2002. He scored the equalising point to end the first round against Cork in a draw and made his final appearance for the team on 31 March 2002 when Waterford suffered a 1–09 to 1–08 defeat by Cork in the first round replay.

On 8 June 2005, Molumphy made his debut for the Waterford under-21 team in the Munster Championship. He scored two points from full-forward in the 2–16 to 0–11 defeat by Cork in what was his only appearance in the grade.

==== Senior ====
Molumphy was drafted onto the Waterford senior team during the 2006 season. He made his first appearance on 8 July 2006 when he was introduced as a 52nd-minute substitute for James Murray at right corner-forward in a 2–17 to 1–13 defeat of Laois in the All-Ireland Qualifiers.

Molumphy became a regular starter during the 2007 National League. On 29 April 2007 he claimed his first silverware when Waterford defeated Kilkenny by 0–20 to 0–18 to win the National Hurling League. On 8 July 2007, Molumphy lined out at left wing-forward when Waterford faced Limerick in the Munster final. He scored two points from play and collected a winners' medal after the 3–17 to 1–14 victory. Molumphy ended the season by being named at left wing-forward on the All-Star team.

On 7 September 2008, Molumphy was selected at left wing-forward when Waterford qualified to play Kilkenny in the All-Ireland final for the first time since 1963. He played the full match as Waterford suffered a large defeat.

Molumphy was appointed joint-captain of the Waterford team alongside Ken McGrath at the start of the 2009 season. On 12 July 2009, he scored two points from full-forward in Waterford's 4–14 to 2–16 defeat by Tipperary in the Munster final.

Molumphy assumed the captaincy of the Waterford team in his own right for the 2010 season. On 11 July 2010, he captained the team from right corner-forward when Waterford drew 2–15 apiece with Cork in the Munster final. Molumphy was switched to right wing-forward for the subsequent replay, which saw him claim a second winners' medal after Waterford's by 1–16 to 1–13 victory.

Molumphy retained the Waterford captaincy for the 2011 season. He captained the team from midfield and scored two points when Waterford were defeated by Tipperary in the Munster final on 10 July 2011.

On 15 July 2012, Molumphy was again selected at midfield when Waterford contested their fourth successive Munster final. He ended the game on the losing side, scoring two points following a 2–17 to 0–16 defeat by Tipperary.

On 5 January 2013, Waterford manager Michael Ryan confirmed Molumphy's unavailability to the team for the 2013 season due to overseas work commitments with the army in Lebanon.

Molumphy returned to the Waterford senior team in December 2013. He played his last game for Waterford on 19 July 2014 when he came on as a 43rd-minute substitute for Darragh Fives at right wing-forward and scored one point in a 3–15 to 2–15 defeat by Wexford in the All-Ireland Qualifiers.

On 23 October 2014, Molumphy announced his retirement from inter-county hurling. In a statement he said: "It has been an honour and privilege to have played on and captained the Waterford senior hurling team since 2006 and been part of one of the most successful periods in Waterford hurling history."

=== Munster ===
Molumphy joined the Munster inter-provincial team in advance of the 2009 Inter-provincial Championship. He made his first appearance for the team on 21 February 2009 when he lined out at full-forward in a 2–20 to 2–18 defeat by Connacht at the semi-final stage.

Molumphy was again selected for Munster for the 2012 Inter-provincial Championship. He made his only appearance of the campaign on 19 February 2012 when he came on as a 44th-minute substitute for Pa Cronin in a 3–14 to 1–16 defeat by Leinster.

After a one-year absence, Molumphy was again selected for Munster in advance of the 2014 Inter-provincial Championship. He made his final appearance for the team on 9 February 2014 when he lined out at left wing-forward in a 1–18 to 0–16 defeat by Connacht in the semi-final.

=== Belgium ===
Molumphy joined Belgium GAA hurling team in late 2024 and two months later was part of the hurling team who won the Vienna Gaelic European Hurling Championship tournament, the first trophy won by Belgium since 2019. Molumphy was awarded the Player of the Tournament award at the first round tournament of the 2025 European Hurling Championships in Maastricht on 3 May 2025. In Oct 2025, Molumphy won his first European hurling medal and was one of the key players of the Bussels mens hurling team who won the 2025 European Hurling Championship 9-aside hurling championship culminating in the final championship round in Copenhagen, Denmark.

== Coaching career ==
=== Irish Defence Forces ===
Molumphy was manager of the DF hurling team between 2018 and 2019 which were successful in retaining the representative series titles.

=== Wexford ===
On 21 November 2018, it was revealed that Molumphy had joined Davy Fitzgerald's Wexford senior hurling management team as a selector. In his first season as a selector/coach, he helped guide the team to the Leinster Championship title after a 1–23 to 0–23 defeat of Kilkenny in the final.

Previous to this Molumphy was manager of Castlemartyr intermediate hurling team in Cork for two years 2016–2017 and led them to league promotion in 2016.

=== Waterford ===
Molumphy served as a selector with Waterford but in the middle of the 2020 season due to work commitments with the Irish Defence Forces in the UK Defence Academy, Oxford, to be replaced by Tom Feeney.

=== Kerry ===
In September 2021 Molumphy was appointed as manager of the Kerry senior hurling team for the coming season.

In his first game in charge Kerry recorded their first victory over Tipperary 0–17 to 0–14 in the Munster Hurling Cup quarter-final. He later lead his side to the Joe McDonagh Cup final. Only to fall short to Antrim by a single point in the final, the closest Kerry have ever come to promotion to Liam McCarthy hurling. He was credited with lowering the average age of the Kerry hurling team from 35 to 24 between 2022 and 2024. In his third year as manager, Kerry finished third in the McDonagh Championship after beating Westmeath, Meath and Down.

After three years as manager of the Kerry senior hurling team, Molumphy stepped down as manager due to work commitments.

=== Waterford ===
In July 2026, Molumphy was appointed as the new Waterford Senior hurling manager on a three-year term.

== Army career ==
Molumphy is currently a Lieutenant Colonel, a rank he was promoted to in 2023, in the Irish Army. He has spent nine months with the Bundeswehr (German Armed Forces) in Germany, served five months in Chad, served six months in Lebanon and was company commander in Syria in 2018. He has served in the 3rd Infantry Battalion in Stephens Barracks in Kilkenny, served as a HR Staff Officer in Defence Forces Headquarters, an instructor in the Military College in the Curragh Camp and served in the Nordic Battle Group in Sweden and as a staff officer in Brigade Operations in Collins Barracks in Cork. He was then appointed as Officer Commanding of Lynch Camp which resides outside Kilworth, County Cork. In summer 2020 Commandant Molumphy was selected to go to England for one year to complete the Advanced Command and Staff Course in the UK Defence Academy. In 2024, he was selected to serve as a strategic level planner with the EU military headquarters in Brussels for 24 months with his family. During this time he worked in the EU Military Assistance mission to Ukraine (EUMAM Ukraine) which meant he was deployed to Ukraine at regular intevals to coordinate the EU military assistance to Ukraine.

== Mountaineering ==
Molumphy is an avid mountain climber after completing several mountaineering course in the Irish military. Molumphy climbed Kilimanjaro, Tanszania (highest summit in Africa) in 2015 and Aconcagua, Argentina (highest summit in South America) in 2024.

== Career statistics ==
Team	Year	National League			Munster		All-Ireland		Total	
Team	Year	Division	Apps	Score	Apps	Score	Apps	Score	Apps	Score
Waterford	2006	Division 1A	0	0-00	0	0-00	2	0-00	2	0-00
Waterford	2007	Division 1A	7	2-06	2	0-02	3	2-03	12	4-11
Waterford	2008	Division 1A	3	0-01	1	0-01	5	1-04	9	1-06
Waterford	2009	Division 1	6	2-04	3	0-03	2	0-00	11	2-07
Waterford	2010	Division 1	7	2-04	3	0-03	1	0-01	11	2-08
Waterford	2011	Division 1	6	0-03	2	0-01	2	0-04	10	0-08
Waterford	2012	Division 1A	4	1-00	2	0-02	1	0-01	7	1-03
Waterford	2013	Division 1A	—		—		—		—	
Waterford	2014	Division 1A	6	0-03	1	0-00	1	0-01	8	0-04
Total			39	7-21	14	0-12	17	3-14	70	10-47

== Honours ==
=== As a player ===
St. Colman's College

- Dr. Croke Cup (2): 2001, 2002
- Dr. Harty Cup (2): 2001, 2002

Ballyduff Upper

- Waterford Senior Hurling Championship (1): 2007 (c)
- Waterford Intermediate Hurling Championship (2): 2005, 2020 (c)

Tipperary

- Boston Senior Hurling Championship (1): 2015

Waterford

- Munster Senior Hurling Championship (2): 2007, 2010 (c)
- National Hurling League (1): 2007

Individual

- All-Stars (1): 2007

=== As a manager ===
Manager of Castlemartyr intermediate hurling club for two years 2016–2017.

=== As a selector ===
Wexford

- Leinster Senior Hurling Championship (1): 2019

Sporting positions
Preceded by Michael Walsh	Waterford Senior Hurling Team Captain; 2009-2011	Succeeded by Michael Walsh
Preceded by Fintan O'Connor	Kerry Senior Hurling Team Manager; 2021-2024	Succeeded by John Griffin
