= Donal Murray =

Donal Murray may refer to:

- Donal Murray (bishop)
- Donal Murray (hurler)
