= Patrick Kearney (hurler) =

Irish hurler

Pa Kearney
Personal information
- Born: 16 November 1987 (age 38) Ballyduff, County Waterford, Ireland

Sport
- Sport: Hurling
- Position: Corner-forward
Club
- Years: Club
- 1990s–present: Ballyduff Upper
Inter-county
Years	County	Apps (scores)
2007–present	Waterford	0 (0-00)
Inter-county titles
- Munster titles: 0
- All-Irelands: 0
- NHL: 0

Patrick 'Pa' Kearney (born 16 November 1987) is an Irish sportsman. He plays hurling with his local club Ballyduff Upper and has been a member of the Waterford senior inter-county team since 2007.

== Playing career ==
=== Club ===
Kearney plays his club hurling with Ballyduff Upper. Kearney has had several successes with the club, including winning the Waterford Intermediate Hurling Championship with the club in 2005 and the Waterford Senior Hurling Championship in 2007.

=== Inter-county ===
Kearney first came to Justin McCarthy's attention after an impressive performance at club level. While Kearney joined the panel during the All-Ireland Senior Hurling Championship in 2007, Kearney did not play his first game for Waterford until the National Hurling League 2008. Kearney was part of the Waterford squad which made the 2008 All-Ireland Senior Hurling Championship Final, the county's first final since 1963. Unfortunately for Kearney, Waterford ended up losing heavily to Kilkenny GAA in the final. Kearney was injured in a car crash in 2009 suffering a spinal injury and will not take part in Waterford's 2010 Hurling Season. All in Waterford GAA wish Kearney a speedy and successful recovery and hope to see him playing hurling for Waterford in the near future.
