= Paudie Prendergast =

Waterford hurler

Personal information
- Native name: Pádraig de Priondragás (Irish)
- Born: 26 September 1960 (age 66) Lismore, County Waterford

Sport
- Sport: Hurling
- Position: Midfield
Club
- Years: Club
- 1970s–2000s: Ballyduff Upper
Club titles
- Waterford titles: 2
Inter-county
- Years: County
- 1980s–1990s: Waterford
Inter-county titles
- Munster titles: 0
- All-Irelands: 0
- All Stars: 0

Paudie Prendergast (born 26 September 1960 in Lismore, County Waterford) is an Irish former hurler who played for the Ballyduff Upper club and at senior level for the Waterford county team.

Prendergast played at midfield. The closest he came to inter-county silverware was in 1989 when Waterford finished runner-up to Tipperary in the Munster Senior Hurling Championship. His club Ballyduff Upper, associated with the village of Ballyduff, County Waterford, and he won two Waterford Senior Hurling Championships in 1982 and 1987. After retiring from senior club hurling in the early 2000s, Prendergast continued to play for a number of years at junior level.

== Honours ==
- Waterford Senior Hurling Championship winner: 1982 and 1987
- Munster Senior Hurling Championship runners-up: 1989
