= Ollie Moran =

Irish sportsperson (born 1975)

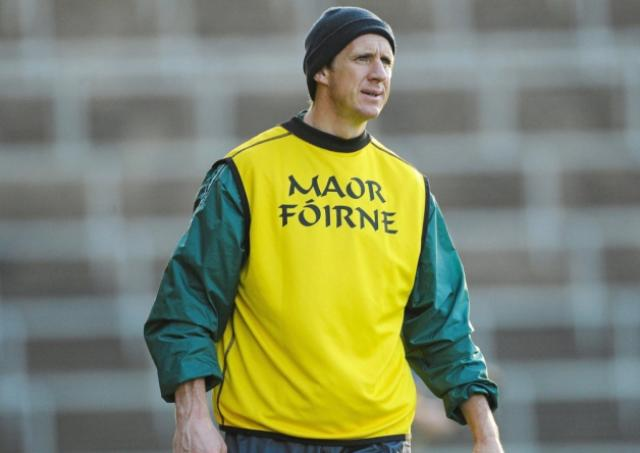

Personal information
- Native name: Oilibhéar Ó Moráin (Irish)
- Nickname: Ollie
- Born: 7 November 1975 (age 50) Castleconnell, County Limerick
- Occupation: Financial Advisor
- Height: 6 ft 2 in (188 cm)

Sport
- Sport: Hurling
- Position: Right wing-back
Club
- Years: Club
- 1990s–present: Ahane
Club titles
- Limerick titles: 3
- Munster titles: 0
College
- Years: College
- 1994–2003: Waterford IT
College titles
- Fitzgibbon titles: 2
Inter-county
Years	County	Apps (scores)
1997–2009	Limerck	? (6–29)
Inter-county titles
- Munster titles: 0
- All-Irelands: 0
- NHL: 1
- All Stars: 1

Oliver Moran (born 7 November 1975 in Castleconnell, County Limerick) is an Irish sportsperson. He plays hurling with his local club Ahane and was a member of the Limerick senior inter-county team from 1997 to 2009. During his career as a hurler, he has won 3 County Championships with Ahane, 2 Fitzgibbon Cup titles with Waterford IT, a National Hurling League and Waterford Crystal Cup title with Limerick, 5 Railway Cup titles with Munster and a shinty/hurling international with Ireland. Ollie's individual accolades include a Munster All-Star award in 2004 and a GAA All-Star award in 2007. He was also captain of the Limerick Senior Hurling Team in 2005. In 2013 he appeared as a studio analyst on The Sunday Game.

== Biography ==
Ollie Moran was born in Castleconnell, County Limerick in 1975. He was raised by his parents, Pat and Brigid, on a dairy farm along with his brother and fellow Limerick hurler, Niall. He was born into a family that has a strong association with the game of hurling. He is a first cousin to Tipperary hurlers, Eoin and Paul Kelly and is also a relation of former Tipperary manager, Babs Keating. From an early age, Ollie showed great skill as an all-round sports star. He played both hurling and football at minor level for Limerick. As well as Gaelic games, Ollie was an accomplished rugby union player. At underage, he was more into rugby and played at full back for Ireland U18s, the Irish Colleges, and Munster U18s and U20s. He won an AIL Division Four medal with UL Bohemians. Ollie was educated at local secondary school, Ardscoil Rís, and later attended Waterford Regional Technical College where he graduated with a First Class Honours Degree (BA) in Financial Services. He has worked as a Financial Advisor in the Financial Services industry since 1997. He is the owner and principal director of company, Ollie Moran Financial Services Limited, which have been based in Limerick since September 2008. He lives with his wife, Lisa, and son, David.

== Playing career ==
=== Club ===
Ollie plays his club hurling with Ahane, the club made famous by the legendary Mick Mackey. He enjoyed much success at under-age level and was later part of 3 different senior teams that won the Limerick County Championship. Moran received his first senior championship medal in 1998 when Ahane beat Patrickswell by 1–11 to 0–9. He wasn't long waiting for a second county medal as Ahane were in the final the following year, this time against Kilmallock whom they drew with in the first final, 0–12 to 2–6. However, Ahane were crowned champions after the game was replayed at the Gaelic Grounds in Limerick. They won the game by a scoreline of 0–14 to 2–5. Ollie played at centre-back and picked up the man of the match award for a great performance which saw him score 3 points in total. Ahane were back in the county final in 2002, however they lost on this occasion to Adare by 0–14 to 0–12. Ollie picked up his third county medal in 2004 when Ahane beat Garryspillane in the final. Ollie's brother, Niall, was the hero on this occasion after he scored a 58-yard free deep into injury time to put their team ahead by a single point and win by 1–11 to 0–13. The most recent county final that Ollie featured in was the 2008 final against Adare who once again defeated them, this time by a scoreline of 0–13 to 0–8. Despite having won numerous county titles, Ollie and the Ahane club have never been successful in the Munster Club Championship and hence have never progressed to the All-Ireland Club Championship.

=== Colleges ===
Ollie attended Waterford Regional Technical College (WRTC), now known as Waterford Institute of Technology (WIT), between the years of 1994 and 2003. Here, his hurling skills came to the fore. In 1994, his first year playing for WRTC, he won an All-Ireland Freshers Hurling title as well as featuring in the Fitzgibbon Cup team that lost in extra time of the final to UL by 2–11 to 1–11. The following year, WRTC were back in the Fitzgibbon Cup final, this time against UCD whom they beat by 3–15 to 1–4. Ollie featured as a substitute on this team. Ollie didn't play in another Fitzgibbon Cup final until 2003, when WIT beat Cork IT by 0–13 to 0–7, earning him his second medal. This time he gave brilliant performance at midfield and managed to score a point early on in the game.

=== Inter-county ===
In the early 1990s, Ollie joined the Limerick minor hurling panel. He later graduated on to the county's under-21 team, however, he had little success at either level. Ollie joined the extended Limerick panel as a 22-year-old in 1996 and he made his senior debut in a league game against Kilkenny in 1997. That year, Limerick went on to win the league and Ollie captured his first senior inter-county medal after beating Galway in the final by 1–12 to 1–9. The closest that Ollie came to winning another league title was in 2006 when they lost to Kilkenny in the final by 3–11 to 0–14. That same year, Limerick did however win the first ever Waterford Crystal Cup title when they beat Ollie's former college, WIT in the final by 1–19 to 3–10. Ollie displayed an impressive performance at right half-back in the Gaelic Grounds that day and also contributed a point to Limerick's tally. Ollie never experienced any success with Limerick in the Provincial or All-Ireland Championship. He reached 2 Munster finals with them in 2001 and 2007. He also reached the All-Ireland final with them in 2007 which they lost to Kilkenny by 2–19 to 1–15. However, Ollie displayed a great individual performance that day and scored a personal tally of 1–3 having started at centre-forward. He was rewarded with an All-Star award for his efforts that year. As an individual, he was also picked for the Munster All-Star Team in 2004 and as captain of the Limerick Senior Team in 2005. In October 2009, Ollie announced his retirement from inter-county hurling after 13 years.

=== Inter-provincial ===
Ollie lined out for the Munster hurling team in 8 different seasons between the years of 1997 and 2007. During that time he won 5 Railway Cup medals in 1997, 2000, 2001, 2005 and 2007. He also featured in an additional 3 Railway Cup finals in 1999, 2002 and 2004 in which Munster were defeated. The last time he played for Munster was in October 2007 when they beat Connacht in the final by 2–22 to 1–19.

=== Composite rules ===
In October 2000, Ollie was part of the Ireland team that beat Scotland in a shinty/hurling international by 57 to 32. This was the first time Ireland had tasted victory over Scotland in 21 years, having previously endured 5 consecutive defeats.

== Coaching career ==
In 2014 Moran was appointed coach to Tipperary club side Borris-Ileigh. In 2019 he managed the Offaly Senior hurling team.

In 2022, Moran became involved with the Blackrock Senior hurling team in County Limerick.

== Honours ==
=== Ahane ===
- Limerick Senior Hurling Championship

Winner (3): 1998, 1999, 2004
Runner-up (2): 2002, 2008

=== Waterford Institute of Technology ===
- Fitzgibbon Cup

Winner (2): 1995 (sub), 2003
Runner-up (1): 1994

- All-Ireland Freshers Hurling

Winner (1): 1994

=== Limerick ===
- All-Ireland Senior Hurling Championship

Runner-up (1): 2007

- Munster Senior Hurling Championship

Runner-up (2): 2001, 2007

- National Hurling League

Winner (1): 1997
Runner-up (1): 2006

- Waterford Crystal Cup

Winner (1): 2006

=== Munster ===
- Railway Cup

Winner (5): 1997, 2000, 2001, 2005, 2007
Runner-up (3): 1999, 2002 (sub), 2004

=== Ireland ===
- Composite Rules International

Winner (1): 2000

=== Individual ===
- GAA All-Star

Winner (1): 2007
Nominated (2): 2004, 2007

- Munster All-Star

Winner (1): 2004

Sporting positions
Preceded by T. J. Ryan	Limerick Senior Hurling Captain; 2005	Succeeded by T. J. Ryan
