= Danny Fitzgerald (sportsperson) =

Irish hurler and Gaelic footballer

Personal information
- Native name: Dónall Mac Gearailt (Irish)
- Born: Limerick, Ireland

Sport
- Football Position: Corner-forward
- Hurling Position: Midfield
Club
- Years: Club
- 1980s–1990s 1980s–1990s: Claughaun
Club titles
	Football	Hurling
Limerick titles	8	1
Inter-county
- Years: County
- 1985–1993 1983–1990: Limerick (F); Limerick (H)
Inter-county titles
	Football	Hurling
Munster Titles	0	0
All-Ireland Titles	0	0
League titles	0	2
All-Stars	0	0

Danny Fitzgerald (1961 – 10 January 2010) was an Irish sportsperson. A dual player at the highest levels, he played hurling and Gaelic football with his local club Claughaun and was a member of the Limerick senior inter-county teams in both codes between 1983 and 1993.

Sporting positions
Preceded by Paddy Kelly	Limerick Senior Hurling Captain; 1987	Succeeded by
