= James O'Brien (hurler) =

Irish hurler (born 1983)

Personal information
- Native name: Séamus Ó Briain (Irish)
- Born: Bruree, County Limerick
- Occupation: Nurse

Sport
- Sport: Hurling
- Position: Forward
Club
- Years: Club
- 2001-present: Bruree
Club titles
- Limerick titles: 1
Inter-county
Years	County	Apps (scores)
2003-present 2008	Limerick; Kerry	16 (0-10); 3 (?)
Inter-county titles
- Munster titles: 0
- All-Irelands: 0
- NHL: 2
- All Stars: 1

James O'Brien (born 1983) is an Irish athlete from Bruree, County Limerick. He is a hurler for Bruree and has represented both the Limerick and Kerry senior inter-county teams since 2003. In 2007, he assisted Tralee IT in winning the Ryan Cup and became the only player outside the Fitzgibbon Cup to receive a Higher Education All-Star award that year. He won the Limerick Senior Hurling Championship with Bruree in 2006.

Preceded by Brian Geary	Limerick Senior Hurling Captain; 2007	Succeeded by Mark Foley
