= Peter Lawlor (hurler) =

Irish hurler

Personal information
- Native name: Peadar Ó Leathlobhair (Irish)
- Born: Croom, County Limerick, Ireland

Sport
- Sport: Hurling
- Position: Right wing-back
Club
- Years: Club
- 2000-present: Croom
Inter-county
- Years: County
- 2002-: Limerick
Inter-county titles
- Munster titles: 0
- All-Irelands: 0

Peter Lawlor (born 1982 in Croom, County Limerick) is an Irish sportsperson. He plays hurling with his local club Croom and has been a member of the Limerick senior inter-county team since 2002.

== Playing career ==
=== Club ===
Lawlor plays his club hurling with his local club in Croom and has enjoyed some success. As an under-age player he captured played in the minor county final in 1998, however, Croom were defeated by Adare. Lawlor later moved onto the club's under-21 team where he won a county title in this grade in 2001. Croom's dominance at minor and under-21 levels bore fruit at senior level in 2007 when the club qualified for the final of the senior county championship Unfortunately, Croom were completely trounced by Adare on a score line of 0–14 to 0–5.

=== Under-21 ===
Lawlor first came to prominence on the inter-county scene as a member of the Limerick under-21 team in the early years of the new century. In 2001 Lawlor joined the team and he quickly picked up his first Munster title. Limerick later qualified for the All-Ireland final where Wexford were the opponents. In spite of leaving in two goals Limerick emerged victorious by 0–17 to 2–10. It was Lawlor's first All-Ireland under-21 winners' medal.

2002 saw Lawlor being appointed captain of the under-21 team with Limerick reaching the provincial decider once again. After an exciting contest with Tipperary, which included extra-time, saw Limerick win by 1–20 to 2–14. It was his second consecutive Munster under-21 winners' medal. For the third year in-a-row Limerick lined out in the All-Ireland final with Galway providing the opposition once again. Limerick kept a clean sheet once again as Limerick powered to a 3–17 to 0–8 victory. It was Lawlor's second consecutive All-Ireland under-21 winners' medal while he also had the honour of receiving the cup.

=== Senior ===
By this stage Lawlor had already made his debut with the Limerick senior hurling team. His first few years with the senior team proved difficult for both Lalwor and for Limerick. In spite of coming close to creating some hurling upsets, defeat seemed to be Limerick's lot. In 2005 Peter was awarded the man of the match award in the All Ireland Hurling Quarter Final although playing on the Limerick side beaten by Kilkenny. He was also nominated for an All Star in 2005. In 2006 Limerick remained unbeaten throughout the entire National Hurling League campaign and qualified for the final against Kilkenny. It was an unhappy day for Limerick as 'the Cats' won the game by 3-11 0–14. In spite of some success in the league, Limerick's championship form was still below par.

All this changed in 2007 when Limerick had one of their best seasons. That year Limerick faced near neighbours Tipperary in the semi-final of the Munster championship. That game ended in a draw with both sides scoring 1–19. The replay saw Limerick in arrears by ten points at half-time, however, Limerick rallied to level the game at the end of normal time. A period of extra time had to be played and Andrew O'Shaughnessy turned out to be the hero as he scored the equalising point which meant that the sides had to play for a third time. Once again, Limerick looked vulnerable at times during the game, however, they grinded out a victory with a score line of 0–22 to 2–13. It was Limerick's first win in the Munster championship since 2001. Lawlor later lined out against Waterford in the Munster final, however, they were defeated on a score line of 3–17 to 1–14. These two sides later met again in the All-Ireland semi-final, however, manager Richie Bennis had done his homework and masterminded a surprise 5–11 to 2–15 victory over the Munster champions. This victory allowed Lawlor's side to play Kilkenny in the championship decider. Unfortunately, Limerick got off to a bad start with goalkeeper Brian Murray letting in two goals by Eddie Brennan and Henry Shefflin in the first ten minutes. Limerick fought back, however, 'the Cats', however, went on to win the game by six points.

After the highs of the previous year, 2008 proved to be a difficult year for the Limerick hurlers with Lawlor failing to make any championship appearances.

Achievements
Preceded by Timmy Houlihan (Limerick)	All-Ireland Under-21 Hurling Final winning captain 2002	Succeeded by Jackie Tyrrell (Kilkenny)
