= Hugh Flavin =

Irish hurler

High Flavin
Personal information
- Native name: Aodh Ó Flaithimhín (Irish)
- Born: Croom, County Limerick, Ireland

Sport
- Sport: Hurling
- Position: Centre-forward
Club
- Years: Club
- Croom
Club titles
- Limerick titles: 0
Inter-county*
| Years | County | Apps (scores) |
| 2007-2008 | Limerick | 1 (0-00) |
Inter-county titles
- Munster titles: 0
- All-Irelands: 0
- NHL: 0
- All Stars: 0
- *Inter County team apps and scores correct as of 15:50, 4 November 2012.

Hugh Flavin is an Irish hurler who played as a centre-forward for the Limerick senior team.

Flavin joined the team during the 2007 National League and was a semi-regular member of the starting fifteen over the following two seasons. He enjoyed little success in the senior grade and was an unused substitute in Limerick's All-Ireland final defeat in 2007.

At club level Flavin plays with Croom.

== Playing career ==
=== Club ===
Flavin plays his club hurling with Croom and has enjoyed some success.

In 2001 he lined out in a county under-21 championship decider. Ballybrown were the opponents, however, a comprehensive 1–12 to 0–4 victory gave Flavin an under-21 championship medal.

=== Inter-county ===
Flavin made his senior debut for Limerick in a National League game against Antrim in 2007. He played a number of games during that campaign and was subsequently included on Limerick's championship panel, making his debut in a Munster semi-final defeat of Tipperary. Flavin was an unused substitute for Limerick during their 2–19 to 1–15 defeat by Kilkenny in the 2007 All-Ireland final.

Flavin played a number of National League games for Limerick again in 2008, however, he left the panel after that year's championship.

== Honours ==
=== Team ===
Croom

- Limerick Under-21 Club Hurling Championship (1): 2001
