= Mark Foley (Limerick hurler) =

Irish sportsperson

Personal information
- Native name: Marc Ó Foghlú (Irish)
- Born: 17 April 1975 (age 51) Cork, Ireland
- Occupation: Publican
- Height: 5 ft 11 in (180 cm)

Sport
- Sport: Hurling
- Position: Left wing-back
Club
- Years: Club
- 1993–2012: Adare
Club titles
- Limerick titles: 5
Inter-county
Years	County	Apps (scores)
1995–2009	Limerick	47 (1-16)
Inter-county titles
- Munster titles: 1
- All-Irelands: 0
- NHL: 1
- All Stars: 2

Mark Foley (born 17 April 1975 in Cork, Ireland) is an Irish sportsperson. He plays hurling with his local club Adare and was a member at inter-county level of the Limerick senior team from 1995 until 2009.

== Early life ==
Mark Foley was born in Cork in 1975 and when he was nine months old his family moved to Adare, County Limerick. He was born into a family that had a great interest in Gaelic games. His father would later serve as a selector with the Limerick senior hurling team. Foley was educated locally and later attended Mary Immaculate College in Limerick where he studied to be a primary school teacher. Here he played on both the college hurling and college football teams.

== Playing career ==
=== Club ===
Foley plays his club hurling with his local Adare team. He has had much success with the club, winning under-12, under-14, under-16 and minor county medals throughout the late 1980s and early 1990s. In 2001 and 2002. Foley won back-to-back senior county championship medals with Adare. They were beaten in the 2003 final by Patrickswell. In 2007 he (and Adare) won a third county senior championship and a fourth in 2008.

In early 2013 Foley played junior hurling with Castletown/Ballyagran the very same parish as where he run's the local pub, however there was mixed fortunes for the club as they won the South junior hurling championship but were then beaten in a county semi-final by local rivals Feenagh/Kilmeedy

On 30 December 2013 Foley was announced vice-chairman of Castletown/Ballyagran GAA club .

=== Inter-county ===
Foley has played hurling at all levels with Limerick. In the early 1990s he played on both the minor and under-21 teams, however, he had little success. He later joined the senior side and was a member of the panel when Limerick won the Munster Championship in 1994. The team later lost the All-Ireland final to Offaly in what has become known as 'the five-minute final.' In 1995 Foley made his championship debut against Tipperary, however, Limerick later lost the Munster final to Clare. The following year he won his first Munster title as a full member of the team and Limerick later qualified to play Wexford in the All-Ireland final. For the second time in three years Limerick left Croke Park empty handed. There was some consolation for Foley as his performance in the championship earned him an All-Star award and he was also crowned the All Stars Young Hurler of the Year.

In 1997 Foley won a National Hurling League medal with Limerick, however, the following decade saw Limerick's senior hurling fortunes take a dramatic downturn. In spite of this Foley received a second All-Star award in 2001. Six years later in 2007 Limerick had an epic battle with Tipp in the provincial championship. After a second replay Foley's side emerged victorious and qualified to play Waterford in the Munster final. Although Limerick lost on that occasion the team showed that they were not a pushover. Limerick later gained their revenge on Waterford by defeating them in the All-Ireland semi-final. This victory allowed Foley's side to play Kilkenny in the championship decider. Unfortunately, Limerick got off to a bad start with goalkeeper Brian Murray letting in two goals in the first ten minutes. 'The Cats', however, went on to win the game by six points.

In the 2009 All-Ireland Championship quarter-final against Dublin, Foley became Limerick's most "capped" player of all time. It was his 46th Championship appearance for Limerick, overtaking Timmy Ryan's record which had stood since 1946. He led his team as far as the All-Ireland semi-finals before being knocked out by Tipperary.

=== Provincial ===
Foley has also lined out with Munster in the Railway Cup inter-provincial competition. He captured a winners medal in this competition in 1997 as Munster defeated Leinster.

Sporting positions
Preceded by Barry Foley	Limerick Senior Hurling Captain; 2002–2003	Succeeded by Ciarán Carey
Preceded by James O'Brien	Limerick Senior Hurling Captain; 2008–2009	Succeeded by Bryan O'Sullivan
