= Donal Murray (hurler) =

Irish hurler

Personal information
- Native name: Dónall Ó Muirí (Irish)
- Born: 24 August 1956 (age 70) Croom, County Limerick
- Occupation: Computer programmer
- Height: 5 ft 11 in (180 cm)

Sport
- Sport: Hurling
- Position: Right corner-back
Club
- Years: Club
- 1970s-1990s: Croom
Inter-county
- Years: County
- 1970s-1980s: Limerick
Inter-county titles
- Munster titles: 2
- All-Irelands: 0
- NHL: 0
- All Stars: 0

Donal Murray (born 24 August 1956) is a retired Irish sportsman. Born in Croom, County Limerick, he played hurling with his local club Croom and was a member of the Limerick senior inter-county team in the 1970s and 1980s.
