= John Galvin (Gaelic footballer) =

Irish Gaelic footballer

Personal information
- Native name: Seán Ó Galbháin (Irish)
- Born: 1980 (age 45–46) Limerick, Ireland
- Height: 1.93 m (6 ft 4 in)

Sport
- Sport: Gaelic Football
- Position: Midfield
Clubs
- Years: Club
- 1998-2013 2014-: Croom; Cratloe
Club titles
- Clare titles: 1
Inter-county
- Years: County
- 1999-2014: Limerick
Inter-county titles
- Munster titles: 0
- All-Irelands: 0
- NFL: 1
- All Stars: 2

John Galvin is a former Gaelic footballer who played as a midfielder for Limerick in a career spanning 15 years from 1999 to 2014. He played his club football with Croom before transferring to Cratloe in Clare where he had been living for some years.

He was captain of the Limerick team that won the Munster Under-21 Football Championship in 2000. He played in 4 Munster Senior Football Championship finals but lost all 4 to Kerry in 2003, 2004 and 2010 and to Cork in 2009. In April 2003, he was named Vodafone GAA All-Stars Player of the Month for his part in helping Limerick win the Division 4 final of the National Football League. He was Man of the Match in the 2010 final scoring 1-02. He was picked on the 2010 GPA awards team at midfield. He also plays hurling with Croom. He has been an all star nominee 3 times 2004, 2009, 2010. In 2008 he was part of the Munster team that won the Railway Cup.

In 2014, Galvin switched clubs to play for Cratloe in county Clare after living in the area for four years. He won the Clare Senior Football Championship with Cratloe in 2014.

Galvin announced his retirement from inter-county football on 8 January 2015 after spending 15 years with Limerick and became what some people said "Limerick's greatest ever player."

== Honours ==
Limerick

- Munster Under-21 Football Championship (1): 2000
- National Football League, Division 4 (1): 2010
- Munster Final Man of The Match (1): 2010
- GPA Team Of The Year (1): 2010

Cratloe

- Clare Senior Football Championship (1): 2014

Munster

- Railway Cup (1): 2008
