= Adrian Power =

Irish hurler and footballer

Personal information
- Native name: Adrian de Paor (Irish)
- Nickname: DJ Odyssey
- Born: 4 May 1988 (age 38) Ballyduff Upper, County Waterford

Sport
- Sport: Hurling
- Position: Goalkeeper
Club
- Years: Club
- Ballyduff Upper
Inter-county*
Years	County	Apps (scores)
2008 -	Waterford	0 (0-00)
Inter-county titles
- Munster titles: 0
- All-Irelands: 0
- NHL: 0
- All Stars: 0
- *Inter County team apps and scores correct as of 21 July 2008.

Adrian Power (born 4 May 1988) is an Irish sportsperson. He plays both hurling and football with his local club Ballyduff Upper GAA and he plays hurling with the Waterford senior inter-county team.

Adrian has been a member of the Waterford Senior Panel since 2008 after a number of impressive performances in goal for both his local club Ballyduff Upper GAA as well as for Waterford Institute of Technology in the Fitzgibbon Cup where they won the competition in 2008.

Adrian is noted for his long puck outs having won the Waterford long puck competition three years in a row from 2006 to 2008 as well as representing Waterford in the national long puck competition.
