= Bryan O'Sullivan =

Irish hurler

Personal information
- Native name: Brian Ó Súilleabháin (Irish)
- Born: 24 January 1988 (age 38) Kilmallock, County Limerick, Ireland
- Height: 6 ft 2 in (188 cm)

Sport
- Sport: Hurling
- Position: Left wing-forward
Club
- Years: Club
- 2006-present: Kilmallock
Club titles
- Limerick titles: 1
Inter-county
Years	County	Apps (scores)
2009-present	Limerick	3 (1-01)
Inter-county titles
- Munster titles: 0
- All-Irelands: 0
- NHL: 0
- All Stars: 0

Bryan O'Sullivan (born 24 January 1988 in Kilmallock, County Limerick) is an Irish sportsperson. He plays hurling with his local club Kilmallock and has been a member at inter-county level of the Limerick senior team since 2009. O'Sullivan was captain of the Limerick senior hurling team for 2010.

Sporting positions
Preceded by Mark Foley	Limerick Senior Hurling Captain; 2010	Succeeded by Gavin O'Mahony
