= Ballyduff Upper GAA =

Gaelic sports club in County Waterford, Ireland

Ballyduff Upper GAA Club
- Baile Ui Dhuibh CLCG
- Founded: 1886
- County: Waterford
- Nickname: The Village
- Colours: Red and White
- Coordinates: 52°08′30.30″N 8°03′06.26″W

Playing kits
Standard colours

Senior Club Championships
	All Ireland	Munster champions	Waterford champions
Football:	-	-	1
Hurling:	-	-	3

Ballyduff Upper GAA Club is a GAA club based in the west County Waterford village of Ballyduff, Republic of Ireland. The club has won the Waterford Senior Hurling Championship three times, in 1982, 1987 and most recently in 2007. While mainly a hurling club, the club has had some success in Gaelic football, winning the Waterford Senior Football Championship in 1924.

Ballyduff won the 2007 Waterford Senior Championship after beating Ballygunner on a scoreline of 1–18 to 1–14. Ballyduff are the first West Waterford side to win the county championship since 1993. The title is seen as a great achievement considering Ballyduff only won the Waterford Intermediate Championship in 2005. Ballyduff Upper Club was awarded the 'Club of the Year award' in 2005.

== Honours ==
In addition to being named 'Club of the Year' in 2005, achievements by Ballyduff Upper have included:

- Waterford Senior Hurling Championships (3): 1982, 1987, 2007
- Waterford Intermediate Hurling Championships (5): 1964, 1975, 2005, 2020, 2026
- Waterford Junior Hurling Championships (2): 1953, 1971
- Waterford Junior B Hurling Championship (1): 2025
- Waterford Senior Football Championships (1): 1924
- Waterford Intermediate Football Championships (2): 1973, 1981, 2013
- Waterford Junior Football Championships (5): 1915, 1917, 1953, 1997, 2008

== Notable hurlers ==
- Mossie Walsh, inter-county hurler and 1980 All-Star
- Stephen Molumphy, 2010 Munster Senior Hurling Championship winning captain. 2007 All-Star
- Tom Feeney, inter-county hurler
- Patrick Kearney, inter-county hurler
- Adrian Power, football and inter-county hurler
- Paudie Prendergast, inter-county hurler
- Johnny Quirke, inter-county hurler
- Mikey Kearney, inter-county hurler

Preceded by Ballygunner GAA	Waterford Senior Hurling Championship; 2007	Succeeded by De La Salle GAA
