= Tom Feeney (hurler) =

Irish hurler (born 1974)

Personal information
- Native name: Tomás Ó Fiannaí (Irish)
- Born: 4 February 1974 (age 52) Ballyduff, County Waterford, Ireland
- Occupation: EMC employee
- Height: 6 ft 2 in (188 cm)

Sport
- Sport: Hurling
- Position: Full-back
Clubs
- Years: Club
- Ballyduff Upper; Sarsfields
Club titles
- Waterford titles: 1
Inter-county*
Years	County	Apps (scores)
1993-2008	Waterford	36 (0-00)
Inter-county titles
- Munster titles: 1
- All-Irelands: 0
- NHL: 0
- All Stars: 0
- *Inter County team apps and scores correct as of 19:03, 3 November 2012.

Thomas Feeney (born 4 February 1974) is an Irish former hurler who played as a full-back for the Waterford senior team.

Feeney joined the team during the 1993-94 National League and was a regular member of the starting fifteen until his retirement after the 2008 championship. During that time, he won one Munster winners' medal. Feeney was an All-Ireland runner-up on one occasion.

At club level, Feeney is a one-time county championship medallist with Ballyduff Upper. He also played with the Sarsfields in Cork.

== Playing career ==
=== Club ===
Feeney played club hurling with the Ballyduff Upper club in Waterford.

In 2007 he lined out in the final of the county championship with Ballygunner. A 1-18 to 1-14 victory gave Feeney a Waterford Senior Hurling Championship medal.

Feeney also spent one season with the Sarsfields club in Cork.

=== Inter-county ===
Feeney first came to prominence on the inter-county scene as a member of the Waterford minor hurling team. In 1992 he won a Munster medal in that grade following a two-game series with Tipperary. Waterford later qualified for the All-Ireland final, but Galway had a 1-13 to 2-4 victory.

Feeney made his senior debut for Waterford in a National Hurling League game against Wexford in 1993.

In 2002 Waterford reached the Munster final. Feeney collected a Munster medal that year as Waterford beat Tipperary by 2-23 to 3-12. It was their first provincial win in thirty-nine years. Waterford's championship came to an end in the All-Ireland semi-final.

Feeney was a regular at full-back by this stage, but was not involved in Waterford's Munster National League success in 2007.

The Waterford team under manager Justin McCarthy lost their opening game in 2008 to Clare, but were ultimately successful in reaching the All-Ireland final for the first time in forty-five years. Following defeat by 3-30 to 1-13 to Kilkenny, who claimed a third All-Ireland title in-a-row, Feeney retired from his inter-county career.

== Post-playing career ==
Feeney was appointed as a selector with Waterford ahead of the 2021 season in place of Stephen Molumphy, who left due to work commitments.
