= Stephen Lucey =

Irish hurler and Gaelic footballer

Personal information
- Native name: Stiofán Ó Luasaigh (Irish)
- Born: 4 January 1980 (age 46) Croom, County Limerick
- Height: 6 ft 2 in (188 cm)

Sport
- Football Position: Centre-back
- Hurling Position: Full-back
Club
- Years: Club
- 1998-present: Croom
Club titles
	Football	Hurling
Limerick titles	1 (UCD)	0
Inter-county
- Years: County
- 1999-2009-2011-2015 2000-2015: Limerick (H); Limerick (F)
Inter-county titles
	Football	Hurling
Munster Titles	1	2
All-Ireland Titles	0	2
League titles	1	1
All-Stars	0	0

Stephen Lucey (born 4 January 1980 in Croom, County Limerick) is a former Irish sportsperson. He plays hurling with his local club Croom and was with the Limerick senior inter-county team. He also played football with Limerick.

== Playing career ==
=== Club ===
Lucey plays hurling with his local Croom club and has enjoyed some success. He also played with UCD during his college days.

=== Inter-county ===
Lucey first came to prominence on the inter-county scene as a member of the Limerick under-21 team. He won a Munster title at this level in 2000 before later collecting an All-Ireland medal following a victory over Galway. The following year Lucey won a second set of Munster and All-Ireland under-21 honours, as Limerick completed the second leg of a three-in-a-row. By this stage he had already joined the county senior team, however, Limerick's hurling fortunes were about to take a dramatic downturn. Following the county's victory over Cork in the Munster Championship in 2001 Limerick failed to win a game in the province until their 2007 Munster semi-final victory over Tipperary. This was achieved following a three-game saga, however, Lucey's side later lost the Munster final to Waterford. Limerick later gained revenge by defeating 'the Decies' in the subsequent All-Ireland semi-final, setting up an All-Ireland final meeting with Kilkenny on 2 September 2007. In 2009 Lucey, along with 11 others, was dropped from the hurling squad thus ending his 9-year career. In early 2011 Lucey was recalled to the hurling panel after new Dónal O'Grady was appointed as manager.

== Football ==
Lucey won a Munster Under-21 Football Championship in 2000 and played in the All Ireland final only to lose out to Tyrone in the final. He won 2 Munster Under-21 Hurling Championship in 2000 and 2001. He played in two Munster Senior Football Championship final only to lose out to Kerry both times. He made a return to the football panel in 2009 and played in another Munster Senior Football Championship final but lost out to Cork by a point. The following year Lucey's bad luck went on as Limerick were once again beaten this time by Kerry in the Munster Final.

== Honours ==
Hurling

- 2 All-Ireland Under-21 Hurling Championship 2000 2001
- 2 Munster Under-21 Hurling Championship 2000 2001
- 1 National Hurling League Division 2 2011
- 1 Dublin Under-21 Hurling Championship 2001

Football

- 1 Munster Under-21 Football Championship 2000
- 1 National Football League Division 4 2010
- 1 McGrath Cup 2004
- 1 Dublin Senior Football Championship 2002

Awards

- 1 GPA Hurling Team of the Year 2007
- 1 Munster Hurling Team of the Year 2005
- 1 Munster Football Team of the Year 2004
