= Kevin Tobin =

Irish hurler

Personal information
- Native name: Caoimhin Ó Tóibín (Irish)
- Born: Boher, County Limerick

Sport
- Sport: Hurling
- Position: Forward
Club
- Years: Club
- Murroe-Boher
Inter-county
- Years: County
- 2000s: Limerick
Inter-county titles
- Munster titles: 0
- All-Irelands: 0

Kevin Tobin (born 1981 in Boher, County Limerick) is an Irish sportsperson. He plays hurling with his local club Murroe-Boher and at inter-county level with the Limerick senior team.

== Playing career ==
=== Club ===
Tobin plays his club hurling with his local Murroe-Boher club, however, he has yet to taste success at senior level. Tobin's brother Pat also plays on the team.

=== Inter-county ===
Tobin first came to prominence on the inter-county scene as a member of the successful Limerick under-21 team of the early 2000s. He won his first Munster title in this grade in 2000. He later collected an All-Ireland medal with the team following a victory over Galway in the championship decider. In 2001 Tobin won a second Munster under-21 medal. He played in the All-Ireland final against Wexford scoring 2 points to capture a second consecutive All-Ireland medal. The following year Tobin added a third Munster medal to his collection. Once again Limerick went all the way and Tobin captured a third consecutive All-Ireland medal. It was Limerick's third such victory in-a-row. Tobin later joined the county senior team, however, Limerick hurling was in the doldrums at the time. All this changed in 2007 under the management of Richie Bennis. Limerick began their championship campaign with an epic battle with Tipperary. Limerick went on to win the second replay and qualified to play Waterford in the Munster final. Although Limerick lost on that occasion the team showed that they were not a pushover. Limerick later gained their revenge on Waterford by defeating them in the All-Ireland semi-final. This victory allowed Tobin's side to play Kilkenny in the championship decider. Unfortunately, Limerick got off to a bad start and conceded two goals in the first ten minutes. 'The Cats', however, went on to win the game by six points.
