= Mark O'Riordan =

Irish hurler and Gaelic footballer

Personal information
- Native name: Marc Ó Ríordán (Irish)
- Born: 1980 (age 45–46) Limerick, Ireland
- Height: 1.78 m (5 ft 10 in)

Sport
- Football Position: Right corner back
- Hurling Position: Left half back
Club
- Years: Club
- Croom
Inter-county
- Years: County
- 2002– 2007-2009: Limerick footballers Limerick hurlers
Inter-county titles
	Football	Hurling
Munster Titles	0	0
All-Ireland Titles	0	0
League titles	1	1
All-Stars	0	0

Mark O'Riordan (born 1980 in Croom, County Limerick) is an Irish athlete who plays hurling with his local club Croom and with the Limerick senior inter-county team. He also plays with the Limerick senior football team.

== Playing career ==
=== Club ===
O'Riordan plays his club hurling with his local Croom club and has enjoyed some success.

=== Inter-county ===
Hurling

O'Riordan first came to prominence on the inter-county scene as a member of the Limerick under-21 team. He won a Munster title at this level in 2000 before later collecting an All-Ireland medal following a victory over Galway. The following year O'Riordan won a second set of Munster and All-Ireland under-21 honours, as Limerick completed the second leg of a three-in-a-row. By this stage he had already joined the county senior team, however, Limerick's hurling fortunes were about to take a dramatic downturn. Following the county's victory over Cork in the Munster Championship in 2001 Limerick failed to win a game in the province until their 2007 Munster semi-final victory over Tipperary. This was achieved following a three-game saga, however, O'Riordanside later lost the Munster final to Waterford. Limerick later gained revenge by defeating 'the Decies' in the subsequent All-Ireland semi-final, setting up an All-Ireland final meeting with Kilkenny on 2 September 2007.

Football

O'Riordan was part of the Limerick team that won the Munster U21 Championship in 2000 he also played in the All Ireland Final but lost out to Tyrone. In 2009 he played in the Munster Senior Championship final but lost out by a point Cork. In 2010 he helped Limerick win the National Football League Div 4 title beating Waterford in the final in Croke Park.

== Honours ==
Hurling

- All-Ireland Under-21 Hurling Championship (2): 2000, 2001
- Munster Under-21 Hurling Championship (2): 2000, 2001
- National Hurling League, Division 2 (1): 2011

Football

- Munster Under-21 Football Championship (1): 2000
- National Football League, Division 4 (1): 2010
- McGrath Cup (1): 2004
