= Gavin O'Mahony =

Irish hurler

Personal information
- Native name: Gabhán Ó Mathúna (Irish)
- Born: 11 June 1987 (age 39) Limerick, Ireland
- Height: 1.88 m (6 ft 2 in)

Sport
- Sport: Hurling
- Position: Midfield
Club
- Years: Club
- 2004-: Kilmallock
Club titles
- Limerick titles: 3
- Munster titles: 1
Inter-county
Years	County	Apps (scores)
2007-2017	Limerick	36 (0-21)
Inter-county titles
- Munster titles: 1
- NHL: 1 (Div 2)

Gavin O'Mahony (born 11 June 1987) is an Irish sportsperson. He plays hurling with his local club Kilmallock and was a member at inter-county level of the Limerick senior team from 2007 until 2017.

O'Mahony announced his retirement from inter-county hurling in November 2017.

== Honours ==
Limerick

- Munster Senior Hurling Championship (1): 2013
- National Hurling League (Div 2): 2012

Kilmallock

- Limerick Senior Hurling Championship (3): 2010, 2012, 2014
- Munster Senior Club Hurling Championship (1): 2014

Munster

- Railway Cup (1): 2013

Sporting positions
Preceded by Bryan O'Sullivan	Limerick Senior Hurling Captain; 2011	Succeeded by David Breen
Achievements
Preceded by Diarmuid Lyng (Wexford)	National Hurling League Final (Div 2) winning captain 2011	Succeeded by Incumbent
