= Jim Roche (artist) =

American contemporary artist

- Born: 1943; Jackson County, Florida
- Education: University of Dallas, Texas
- Movement: Contemporary Art, Performance

Jim Roche (born 1943) is an American contemporary artist, known for his "outsider art" chronicling Southern culture in sculptures, graphics, and performance art since the 1960s. His work, which often adopts the folk motifs of contemporary Southern culture, has occasioned descriptions as both "standing for the far right" and ... "confront[ing] hypocrisy and social injustice ... aligned [] with the downtrodden, disenfranchised and working class populations."

== Life and education ==
Roche graduated from the University of Dallas in 1970, and taught at Florida State University from 1973 to 2011. Roche was part of the "Oak Cliff Four", a group of artists from Dallas.

He has been an avid motorcycle racer, and has performed small roles in a number of films—for instance, as a televangelist in "The Silence of the Lambs".

He is married to artist Alexa Kleinbard. In 2023, Roche and Alexa Kleinbard were featured in the group exhibition and accompanying catalog Spirit in the Land, organized by the Nasher Museum of Art at Duke University and later at the Pérez Art Museum Miami in 2024.

== Selected and major works ==
- "Potted Mama" - large sculptural works with sexual elements
- "The Bicentennial Welfare Cadillac" (1976) - A decorated 1950 sedan
- "background piece" (1970s); appeared at the Whitney
- "Don’t Tread on Me No More Y’all: Piece" - A large serpent, satire of the flag of Gadsden, Alabama; appeared in the 37th Venice Biennale in 1976 (full title: "Two hundred years keeping animals down, done brought Da Snake crawlin back around, Flashin Symbols for One and All; Don’t Tread on Me No More Y’all: Piece")
- "Learning to Count" (1982); spoken word performance on a 2-LP album; Roche speaks in character of people from the South
- Co-Curator, with Alexa Kleinbard, Ogden Museum (2011)

== Honors ==
- National Endowment for the Arts in 1975 and 1982
- Florida Arts Council Fellowship in 1980

== Exhibitions ==
- Whitney Annual (1960s)
- Venice Biennale in 1976 (invited)
- Paris Biennale in 1977 (invited)

Selected solo exhibitions

- Dave Hickey's "Clean, Well-Lighted Space" in Dallas (Roche's first solo exhibition)
- Whitney Solo Show (curator, Marcia Tucker)
- Automobile and Culture (1984)
- Made in Florida (1989)
- "Jim Roche: Sense of Place", Gulf Coast Museum of Art, Largo Florida (2003–2004)
- "Jim Roche: Glory Roads", Florida State University Museum of Fine Arts (2010)
- "The Art Guys" (2014)
- "Cultural Mechanic", Ogden Museum of Southern Art, New Orleans (2015) (curated by Bradley Sumrall)
- "Some Americans Feel Like This", Bale Creek Allen Gallery, Austin, Texas (2016)
