= Ciarán Walsh =

Ciarán Walsh (born 1980 in Carlow, Ireland) is a contemporary Irish artist living in Berlin, Germany.

== Career ==
He has exhibited in Mothers Tankstation (Dublin, 2008), VISUAL (Carlow, 2009), Project Arts (Dublin, 2010), Galway Arts Centre (2010).

== Bibliography ==
Walsh, Ciarán (2017). The Sickness, Book One. Düsseldorf/Berlin: TFGC Publishing.
