= Central Hotel fire =

Fatal 1980 building fire in County Donegal

- Date: 8 August 1980
- Location: Bundoran, Donegal, Ireland
- Type: Fire
- Cause: Electrical fault
- Deaths: 10
- Property damage: Central Hotel destroyed

The Central Hotel fire, was a fire at a popular family-owned hotel in the heart of the seaside resort of Bundoran, County Donegal, in the northwest of Ireland. On 8 August 1980, a fire broke out killing ten people, including both locals and holiday makers. The tragedy was covered as part of the RTÉ television series Disasters in summer 2007.

== The blaze ==
Just after midnight on Friday 8 August 1980, a call was made to the emergency services after a fire had been discovered in a small corridor to the back of the main bar, and going towards the main staircase used by the hotel's guests. The fire broke out at the height of the summer season, with sixty guests, mainly couples and families, booked in on the night, while a function was also taking place in the main dance hall of the hotel.

Initially, the town's own fire brigade was dispatched, and was to be aided by other units from across the northwest including Ballyshannon, Donegal Town, Killybegs, Letterkenny and Manorhamilton. As panic spread throughout the town, many locals and holiday makers rushed to the hotel in an effort to rescue some of those who had been trapped inside, with people jumping from the upper floors of the building into blankets held by those below.

The fire spread rapidly and burned so intensely that cars parked on the street outside burst into flames. Ambulances were sent from Ballyshannon and Sligo to bring the many injured to hospital, while the fire brigade fought the blaze throughout the night. The fire brigade and Garda forensic experts launched an investigation into the blaze, as the remains of the hotel smouldered for several days afterwards.

== Victims ==
The names of those who died in the fire were two members of the housekeeping staff, Mary Gallagher and Sadie Dowdican, and 8 hotel guests, Charles Lazenby, Nicola Lamont, Adrienne and Jimmy Kinsella, and John, Anne, Deirdre and James Brennan.

== Investigation ==
Despite calls from the victims' families and Dáil debates for a public enquiry into the circumstances surrounding the fire, similar to that held after the Stardust fire several months later, none was ever held. Calls for an investigation were made again in 2002, when the Fine Gael Senator Jim Higgins called for the Garda handling of the fire to be investigated as part of the Morris Tribunal, an enquiry into police corruption in County Donegal. Higgins said that the fire warranted inclusion in the tribunal's work as claims had been made by the owner of the hotel that Gardaí had tampered with the evidence. However, the terms of reference were not extended to include the fire.

== Depiction in media ==
In 2007, RTÉ's Disaster series investigated the circumstances surrounding the fire. It put forward extracts from the original investigation which stated that it was an electrical fault that had caused the blaze, and stories surrounding the fire of the poor upkeep of the hotel, including allegations that coins had been used rather than electrical fuses.

The programme focused mainly on the Kinsella family from Artane in Dublin who lost two of their children in the fire, and on the unfortunate nature of their deaths. It was the family's first visit to the seaside town, and due to a mix up with bookings the family was split up with the two parents sleeping in separate rooms to their four young children. Sean McEniff, a member of the town council, criticised the programme claiming it would reopen old wounds for the families involved and that it was better left in the past.

== Remembrance ==
At the time of the tragedy, it was one of the worst fires in Irish history, but the following St Valentine's Day (14 February 1981), 48 people died in the Stardust fire at a club in Artane, Dublin (48 had also died in a cinema fire at Dromcolliher in 1926). The Bundoran fire was for a long time not commemorated physically, although in the aftermath of the RTÉ programme the town council voted in favour of a memorial plaque to the ten victims. There was a reluctance to place a plaque on the site of the fire from both councillors and members of the new hotel's board. The site of the Central Hotel lay vacant for several years, but is now occupied by the Grand Central Hotel and Apartments.

However, on Sunday 8 August 2010, a memorial to those who died in the hotel fire was unveiled in the town, exactly 30 years after the tragedy. Families and relatives of the victims attended prayer services in two churches and an unveiling of the memorial seat with the names of the victims inscribed on it.

== See also ==
- Stardust fire
