= Pat Tobin =

Irish hurler

Personal information
- Native name: Pádraig Ó Tóibín (Irish)
- Born: 1982 (age 43–44) Murroe, County Limerick, Ireland

Sport
- Sport: Hurling
- Position: Forward
Club
- Years: Club
- Murroe-Boher
Inter-county
Years	County	Apps (scores)
2004-2011	Limerick	18 (1-14)
Inter-county titles
- Munster titles: 0
- All-Irelands: 0
- NHL: 0
- All Stars: 0

Pat Tobin (born 1982 in Murroe, County Limerick) is an Irish sportsperson. He plays hurling with his local club Murroe-Boher and was a member at inter-county level of the Limerick senior team from 2004 until 2011.

== Playing career ==
=== Club ===
Tobin plays his club hurling with his local Murroe-Boher club, however, he has yet to taste success at senior level. Tobin's brother, Kevin, also plays on the team.

=== Inter-county ===
Tobin first came to prominence on the inter-county scene as a member of the successful Limerick under-21 team of the early 2000s. He came on as a substitute to win a Munster title in this grade in 2000. He later collected an All-Ireland medal with the team following a victory over Wexford in the championship decider. In 2002 Tobin won a second Munster under-21 medal. He later came on as a substitute in the All-Ireland final against Galway to capture a second consecutive All-Ireland medal. It was Limerick's third such victory in-a-row. Tobin later joined the county senior team, however, Limerick hurling was in the doldrums at the time. All this changed in 2007 under the management of Richie Bennis. Limerick began their championship campaign with an epic battle with Tipperary. In the first game of three Tobin contributed 1-1, however, after a second replay Limerick emerged victorious and qualified to play Waterford in the Munster final. Although Limerick lost on that occasion the team showed that they were not a pushover. Limerick later gained their revenge on Waterford by defeating them in the All-Ireland semi-final. This victory allowed Tobin's side to play Kilkenny in the championship decider. Unfortunately, Limerick got off to a bad start and conceded two goals in the first ten minutes. 'The Cats', however, went on to win the game by six points.
