= 1964 Croke Cup =

Irish hurling competition

- Dates: 12-25 April 1964
- Teams: 4
- Champions: Limerick CBS (1st title); Éamonn Cregan (captain)
- Runners-up: St Peter's College

Tournament statistics
- Matches played: 3
- Goals scored: 28 (9.33 per match)
- Points scored: 31 (10.33 per match)
- Top scorer(s): Tom Royce (3-04)

The 1964 Croke Cup was the 13th staging of the Croke Cup since its establishment by the Gaelic Athletic Association in 1944. The competition ran from 12 April to 25 April 1964.

St Finbarr's College were the defending champions, however, they were beaten in the Harty Cup. Representatives from the Ulster Championship were allowed to contest the All-Ireland series for the first time.

The final was played on 25 April 1964 at Croke Park in Dublin, between Limerick CBS and St Peter's College, in what was their first ever meeting in the final. Limerick CBS won the match by 6–07 to 4–05 to claim their first ever Croke Cup title.

Tom Royce was the top scorer with 3-04.

== Qualification ==
Province	Champions
Connacht	St Mary's College
Leinster	St Peter's College
Munster	Limerick CBS
Ulster	St MacNissi's College

== Results ==
=== Semi-finals ===
12 April 1964 Semi-final	Limerick CBS	4-05 - 4-02	St Mary's College	St Brendan's Park
	T Clohessy 3-0, N Carroll 1-1, E Cregan 0-3, E Grimes 0-1.		T Connolly 2-0, N Keogh 2-0, J McLoughlin 0-2.

19 April 1964 Semi-final	St Peter's College	8-07 - 2-05	St MacNissi's College	Croke Park
	N Rochford 2-0, T Royce 2-0, P Bernie 2-0, F O'Neill 1-1, J Furlong 1-1, E Ryan 0-4, E Furlong 0-1.		E Black 1-4, C Donnelly 1-0, E Donnelly 0-1.

=== Final ===
25 April 1964 Final	Limerick CBS	6-07 - 4-05	St Peter's College	Croke Park
	P Nash 2-2, E Grimes 2-0, J Kennedy 1-2, B Cobbe 1-1, E Cregan 0-2.		T Royce 1-4, J Furlong 2-0, D Bernie 1-0, E Furlong 0-1.	Referee: A Higgins (Galway)
