= Conor Armstrong =

Irish cricketer

Personal information
- Full name: Conor Michael Armstrong
- Born: 17 December 1980 (age 45); Drogheda, County Louth, Ireland
- Batting: Left-handed
- Bowling: Right-arm medium

Career statistics
Competition	First-class	List A
Matches	4	5
Runs scored	17	50
Batting average	5.66	10.00
100s/50s	0/0	0/0
Top score	12	17
Balls bowled	132	72
Wickets	0	2
Bowling average	–	38.00
5 wickets in innings	–	0
10 wickets in match	–	0
Best bowling	–	1/17
Catches/stumpings	2/–	0/0
- Source: CricInfo, 25 March 2019

Conor Michael Armstrong (born 17 December 1980) is an Irish cricketer. He is a left-handed batsman and a right-arm medium-pace bowler.

Having first represented the Ireland cricket team at Under-19 level during the Youth World Cup of 2000, he made his debut for the senior side against the MCC in May 2001. He has since gone onto play for them on 27 occasions, including four first-class matches in the 2005 ICC Intercontinental Cup.

He has not played for the senior team since the final of the 2005 Intercontinental Cup against Kenya at Windhoek in October 2005, but he did represent the Ireland A team in 2006.
