= Niall Moran =

Irish hurler

Personal information
- Native name: Niall Ó Moráin (Irish)
- Born: 1 March 1983 (age 43) Castleconnell, County Limerick, Ireland
- Occupation: Secondary school teacher
- Height: 6 ft 3 in (191 cm)

Sport
- Sport: Hurling
- Position: Centre-forward
Club
- Years: Club
- 1999-present: Ahane
Club titles
- Limerick titles: 2
Inter-county*
Years	County	Apps (scores)
2003-2013	Limerick	44 (7-97)
Inter-county titles
- Munster titles: 1
- All-Irelands: 0
- NHL: 0
- All Stars: 0
- *Inter County team apps and scores correct as of 20:05, 16 December 2013.

Niall Moran (born 1 March 1983) is an Irish hurler who played as a centre-forward for the Limerick senior team.

Born in Castleconnell, County Limerick, Moran first played competitive hurling whilst at Ardscoil Rís. He arrived on the inter-county scene at the age of eighteen when he first linked up with the Limerick minor team, before later lining out with the under-21 side. He made his senior debut in the 2003 championship. Moran went on to play a key part in the forwards for a decade, and won one Munster medal and one National Hurling League (Division 2) medal. He was an All-Ireland runner-up on one occasion.

As a member of the Munster inter-provincial team at various times, Moran won one Railway Cup medal in 2007. At club level he won two championship medals with Ahane.

Moran's career tally of 7 goals and 97 points ranks him as Limerick's sixth highest championship scorer of all time.

Throughout his career Moran made 44 championship appearances, making one of Limerick's most "capped" player of all time. He announced his retirement from inter-county hurling on 14 December 2013.

His brothers, Ollie and James, have also played with Limerick.

Moran has also become involved in team management and coaching. He has served as manager and selector with various hurling teams at Ardscoil Rís.

== Honours ==
=== Player ===
Ahane

- Limerick Senior Hurling Championship (2): 1999, 2004

Limerick

- Munster Senior Hurling Championship (1): 2013
- National Hurling League (Division 2) (1): 2011
- All-Ireland Under-21 Hurling Championship (2): 2001, 2002
- Munster Under-21 Hurling Championship (2): 2001, 2002

Munster

- Railway Cup (1): 2007

=== Manager ===
Ardscoil Rís

- Harty Cup (2): 2010, 2011
