= Jack Kennedy (hurler) =

Irish hurler

Personal information
- Native name: Seán Ó Cinnéide (Irish)
- Born: 1982 (age 43–44) Ballyduff, County Waterford, Ireland
- Height: 6 ft 0 in (183 cm)

Sport
- Sport: Hurling
- Position: Left wing-forward
Clubs
- Years: Club
- Ballyduff Lower; De La Salle
Club titles
- Waterford titles: 1
Inter-county*
Years	County	Apps (scores)
2003–2009	Waterford	22 (0–9)
Inter-county titles
- Munster titles: 2
- All-Irelands: 0
- NHL: 1
- All Stars: 0
- *Inter County team apps and scores correct as of 23:41, 1 November 2012.

Jack Kennedy (born 1982) is an Irish hurler who played as a left wing-forward for the Waterford senior team.

Kennedy joined the team during the 2003 National League and was a regular member of the starting fifteen until his retirement during the 2009 championship. During that time he won two Munster winners' medals and one National League winners' medal. Kennedy ended up as an All-Ireland runner-up on one occasion.

At club level Kennedy is a one-time county club championship medalist with De La Salle. He previously played with Ballyduff Lower.

== Playing career ==
=== Club ===
Kennedy began his club hurling career with Ballyduff Lower, however, he enjoyed little success with the club.

In 2012 Kennedy transferred from Ballyduff Lower to the De La Salle club in Waterford city. It was a successful as he won a championship medal at the end of the year as De La Salle trounced Dungarvan by 1–21 to 0–12 in the decider.

=== Inter-county ===
Kennedy made his senior debut for Waterford in a National League game against Dublin in 2003, however, he was unused substitute during the championship.

By 2004 Kennedy made his championship debut in the Munster final against Cork. Described as the game that had everything Waterford beat Cork by 3–16 to 1–21 to win one of the greatest games of hurling ever played. It was Kennedy's first Munster medal.

In 2007 Kennedy added a National Hurling League medal to his collection when Waterford defeated Kilkenny by 0–20 to 0–18 in the final. He later claimed a second Munster medal as Waterford defeated Limerick by 3–17 to 1–14 in the provincial decider. While Waterford were viewed as possibly going on and winning the All-Ireland title for the first time in almost half a century, Limerick ambushed Kennedy's side in the All-Ireland semi-final.

2008 began poorly for Waterford as the team lost their opening game to Clare as well as their manager Justin McCarthy. In spite of this poor start Kennedy's side reached the All-Ireland final for the first time in forty-five years. Kilkenny provided the opposition and went on to trounce Waterford by 3–30 to 1–13 to claim a third All-Ireland title in-a-row.

In the build up to Waterford's All-Ireland quarter-final meeting with Galway in 2009, Kennedy left the Waterford panel.
