= Barry Foley =

Irish sportsman

Personal information
- Native name: Barra Ó Foghlú (Irish)
- Born: 12 May 1977 (age 49) Patrickswell, County Limerick, Ireland
- Height: 5 ft 10 in (178 cm)

Sport
- Sport: Hurling
- Position: Midfield
Club
- Years: Club
- 1993-present: Patrickswell
Club titles
- Limerick titles: 6
Inter-county
Years	County	Apps (scores)
1996–2008	Limerick	? (6-39)
Inter-county titles
- Munster titles: 1
- All-Irelands: 0
- NHL: 1
- All Stars: 0

Barry Foley is an Irish sportsman. He plays hurling with his local club Patrickswell and was a member at inter-county level of the Limerick senior team from 1996 until 2008.

== Early life ==
Barry Foley was born in Patrickswell, County Limerick in on 12 May 1977. He was born into a family that had a strong association with hurling. His father and uncles all played for Patrickswell and one uncle, Seán Foley, won an All-Ireland medal in 1973. Foley was educated locally and later attended secondary school in Limerick. Here he won a Harty Cup medal in 1993 and was named "Man of the Match" in the final.

== Playing career ==
=== Club ===
Foley plays his club hurling with Patrickswell. He has enjoyed much success with the club, winning county medals at under-14, under-15, under-16, minor and under-21 levels. In 1995, he won his first senior county medal. He won another two county medals in 1996 and 1997 before winning his fourth and fifth county titles in 2000 and 2003. In 2006, Foley narrowly missed out on winning a sixth medal when Patrickswell were defeated by a single point by Bruree.

=== Inter-county ===
In the early 1990s, Foley played for both the Limerick minor and under-21 hurling teams but with little success. In 1996, he made his senior debut in a Munster Championship game against Clare. Limerick later won the Munster final and Foley had his first senior inter-county success. In the subsequent All-Ireland final, Foley's side lost to Wexford. The following year he won his first National Hurling League medal. However, since then, Limerick's senior hurling fortunes have taken a downturn and Foley has failed to add any more winners' medals to his collection.
