= Brian Geary =

Irish hurler and Gaelic footballer

Personal information
- Native name: Briain Ó Gadhra (Irish)
- Born: 1980 (age 45–46) Castletroy, County Limerick, Ireland
- Height: 6 ft 3 in (191 cm)

Sport
- Sport: Hurling
- Position: Centre-forward
Club
- Years: Club
- Monaleen
Club titles
	Football	Hurling
Limerick titles	4	0
Inter-county*
Years	County	Apps (scores)
1999-2012	Limerick	45 (0-11)
Inter-county titles
- Munster titles: 0
- All-Irelands: 0
- NHL: 0
- All Stars: 0
- *Inter County team apps and scores correct as of 19:45, 20 November 2012.

Brian Geary (born 1980) is an Irish hurler who played as a centre-forward for the Limerick senior team.

Geary made his first appearance for the team during the 1999 championship and was a regular member of the starting fifteen until his retirement after the 2012 championship. A two-time All-Ireland medalist in the under-21 grade, he enjoyed little success as a member of the county senior team. Geary ended up an All-Ireland runner-up on one occasion.

At club level Geary is a four-time county football championship medalist with Monaleen.

== Playing career ==
=== Club ===
Geary has enjoyed much success as a Gaelic footballer with the Monaleen club.

In 2002 Geary lined out in his first championship decider. Adare provided the opposition and were hopeful of a county double. After a thrilling draw and a replay, Monaleen were the victors on a score line of 1–10 to 1–19. It was Geary's first county championship medal.

After a three-year absence Monaleen returned to the county final again in 2005. A 0–13 to 2–5 defeat of St. Kieran's gave Geary a second championship medal.

Monaleen once again went into decline following this victory, but reached another championship decider in 2010. Adare provided the opposition, however, a 1–9 to 1–5 defeat gave Geary a third county championship medal.

After failing to retain their title on various previous occasions, Monaleen were back in the county final again in 2011. A 1–12 to 1–7 defeat of Newcastle West saw Monaleen retain their title, while Geary collected a fourth championship medal.

=== Minor and under-21 ===
Geary enjoyed his first inter-county success as a dual player in the under-21 grades.

In 2000 he was a key member of the Limerick under-21 football team that broke the provincial dominance of Cork and Kerry. A 0–7 to 0–4 defeat of Waterford gave Geary a Munster medal in football.

That same year Geary was also a member of the successful Limerick under-21 hurling team. After a 1-13 apiece draw with Cork in the provincial decider, Limerick went on to win the replay following a stunning 4–18 to 1–6 victory. It was Geary's first Munster medal in under-21 hurling. Limerick subsequently defeated Galway by 1–13 to 0–13 in the All-Ireland decider, giving Geary an All-Ireland Under-21 Hurling Championship medal.

In 2002 Geary added a second Munster under-21 medal to his collection as Limerick retained their provincial title following a 3–14 to 2–16 defeat of Tipperary. Limerick later went on to defeat Wexford by just a single point to retain their All-Ireland title. It was Geary's last game for the under-21 hurlers.

=== Senior ===
By this stage Geary was a key member of the Limerick senior hurling team. He made his championship debut in a Munster quarter-final defeat by Waterford in 1999.

Two years later in 2001 Geary lined out in his first Munster final at senior level. Tipperary were the opponents on that occasion, however, Limerick faced a narrow 2–16 to 1–17 defeat.

Limerick hurling went into decline following this defeat and faced a number of years of early championship exits.

In 2006 Geary claimed his first silverware at senior level with Limerick. A 1–19 to 3–10 defeat of the Waterford Institute of Technology secured the Waterford Crystal Cup for Geary's side.

Geary was appointed co-captain of the Limerick senior hurling team in 2007. That year he lined out in a second Munster Senior Hurling Championship final, this time with Waterford providing the opposition. A 3–17 to 1–14 defeat was Limerick's lot on that occasion. Limerick later gained their revenge on Waterford in the All-Ireland semi-final, thus gaining qualification to a first All-Ireland decider in eleven years for the Treaty men. Kilkenny provided the opposition and got off to a flying start with Eddie Brennan and Henry Shefflin combining to score two goals within the first ten minutes. Limerick were eventually defeated on a 2–19 to 1–15 score line.

Limerick failed to build on their reasonably successful 2007 season and went into decline once again.

After indicating that he would return for one more season with the Limerick senior hurling team, Geary announced his retirement from inter-county hurling on 19 November 2012.

Sporting positions
Preceded by T. J. Ryan	Limerick Senior Hurling Captain; 2007	Succeeded by Damian Reale
