= Croom GAA =

Gaelic Athletic Association club

- CLG Cromadh
- Founded: 1884
- County: Limerick
- Colours: Blue and white
- Grounds: Páirc na nGael, Church Road

Playing kits
Standard colours

Senior Club Championships
	All Ireland	Munster champions	Limerick champions
Football:	0	0	2
Hurling:	0	0	6

Croom GAA club is a Gaelic Athletic Association club located in Croom, County Limerick, Ireland. The club was founded in 1884 and fields teams in both hurling and Gaelic football.

== Location ==
The club is situated in the parish of Croom in central County Limerick in the south division on the banks of the Maigue. Bordering clubs include Granagh/Ballingarry, Croagh/Kilfinny, Adare, Patrickswell, Crecora/Manister and Banogue. The club is roughly 20 km south of Limerick City.

== History ==
The club was founded in 1884 as Croom Abú's and is one of the oldest clubs in the county. Croom became a force in hurling within the county, winning twenty-three West Senior Hurling titles from 1907 to 1943. During that period, they also won County Senior Hurling Championships in 1908, 1919, 1924, 1929, 1940 and 1941 along with a Junior Hurling title in 1922 and a minor in 1936. At this time they built up a rivalry with Ahane with whom they contested a number of county finals. Croom had a number of All-Ireland winners with Limerick in the early part of the 20th century, including Paddy Buskin in 1897, Mick Feely, Jack O'Shea and Ter Mangan in 1913, Garrett Howard, Mick Mullane and Tom Mangan, Howard, Jim Roche and Jack O'Connell in 1934, Howard and Roche in 1936 and Peter Cregan and Roche in 1940.

In 1950, the club could only field a junior hurling team and they were moved to the south division in 1956. They then won the County Junior Hurling Championship in 1965. Croom first fielded a junior football team in 1954 winning the County Championship in 1967. At this stage, football was becoming the dominant sport in the club. They went on to win seven South Senior Football titles winning County titles in 1976 and 1983 beating Oola and St. Kieran's along with several underage titles. Donal Murray was a member of the Limerick Senior Hurling team that lost the All-Ireland final to Galway in 1980. A South Senior Hurling Crown was won in 1982 but this marked the start of a barren period for the club.

By the mid-1990s there had been a revival in both codes at underage level. The now junior hurlers won the County title in 1996 and won the Intermediate title two years later. Croom won back-to-back Minor County titles in 1996/97 and won a County Under-21 title in 2001 and had several players on the All-Ireland Under-21 winning teams of 2000-02. The footballers won a County Minor title in 1998 and followed it up by winning the County Under-21 titles in 1999 and 2000, along with a County junior championship in 1999. There was also three Croom footballers on the Limerick team that won their first ever Munster Under-21 Football Championship in 2000. In this period, however, Croom did not win intermediate football or senior hurling titles, losing an Intermediate Championship final in 2000 to Gerald Griffin's and a County Senior Hurling final in 2007 when they were beaten by Adare.

Four Croom players, Stephen Lucey, Peter Lawlor, Mark O'Riordan and Hugh Flavin, were part of the Limerick Senior Hurling team that lost the 2007 All-Ireland final. In the late 2000s-early 2010s, the club's underage teams mainly fielded 13-a-side and 11 a-side teams, often amalgamating with neighbouring parishes to field a 15-a-side team. The hurlers lost their senior status in 2013, losing a relegation play-off to rivals Patrickswell and were regraded to play at premier intermediate level for 2014. The footballers were also relegated in 2013, after being beaten by old rivals Gerald Griffin's in the relegation playoff.

== Honours ==
- Limerick Senior Football Championship (2): 1976, 1983
- Limerick Senior Hurling Championship (6): 1908, 1919, 1924, 1929, 1940, 1941
- Limerick Intermediate Hurling Championship (1): 1998
- Limerick Junior Hurling Championship (3): 1922, 1965, 1996
- Limerick Junior Football Football Championship (2): 1967, 1999
- Limerick Under-21 Hurling Championship (1): 2001
- Limerick Under-21 Football Championship (2): 1999, 2000
- Limerick Minor Hurling Championship (3): 1936, 1996, 1997
- Limerick Minor Football Championship (1): 1998

== Notable players ==
- Conor Allis
- Peter Cregan
- Hugh Flavin
- John Galvin
- Garrett Howard
- Peter Lawlor
- Stephen Lucey
- Donal Murray
- Mark O'Riordan
- Jim Roche
