= James Murray (hurler) =

Irish hurler

Personal information
- Native name: Séamas Ó Muirithe (Irish)
- Born: 1979 (age 46–47) Tallow, County Waterford
- Height: 182 cm (6 ft 0 in)

Sport
- Sport: Hurling
- Position: Half-back
Clubs
- Years: Club
- 1996–: Tallow; UCC; Harry Bolands (USA)
Club titles
- Waterford titles: 0
Inter-county**
| Years | County | Apps (scores) |
| 2000–2010 | Waterford | 19 0–00 |
Inter-county titles
- Munster titles: 4
- All-Irelands: 0
- NHL: 1
- **Inter County team apps and scores correct as of August 2008.

James Murray (born 1979) is an Irish sportsperson. He plays hurling with his local club Tallow and with the Waterford senior inter-county team.

== Career ==
=== Club ===
Murray has played with his local club, Tallow from a young age. His greatest achievement with the club was in winning the Waterford Minor Hurling Championship in 1997. As well as playing with Tallow, Murray has represented St. Colmans of Fermoy, winning the Dr. Harty Cup and at collegic level, with UCC in the Fitzgibbon Cup winning two titles, and has also won a North American Championship with the Harry Bolands Chicago in 1999.

=== Inter-county ===
He has represented Waterford at all under-age grades. Murray made his senior inter-county debut for Waterford on 28 May 2000 playing against Tipperary at Páirc Uí Chaoimh, Cork. Murray has had a successful time at inter-county winning 3 Munster Senior Hurling Championships and one National Hurling League in 2007. He also featured on the panel which lost the 2008 All-Ireland Hurling Final to Kilkenny. As well as playing with Waterford, Murray has also represented Munster, winning a Railway cup medal.
