= Seán Foley =

Irish hurler (born 1949)

Personal information
- Native name: Seán Ó Foghlú (Irish)
- Born: 29 October 1949 (age 77) London, England
- Occupation: Hospital supplies officer
- Height: 5 ft 11 in (180 cm)

Sport
- Sport: Hurling
- Position: Left wing-back
Club
- Years: Club
- 1966-1991: Patrickswell
Club titles
- Limerick titles: 11
- Munster titles: 2
Inter-county*
Years	County	Apps (scores)
1970-1983	Limerick	32 (0-11)
Inter-county titles
- Munster titles: 4
- All-Irelands: 1
- NHL: 1
- All Stars: 1
- *Inter County team apps and scores correct as of 16:24, 1 October 2016.

Seán Foley (born 29 October 1949) is an Irish retired hurler whose league and championship career as a left wing-back with the Limerick senior team spanned thirteen seasons from 1970 to 1983.

Born in London, England, Foley was introduced to hurling when his family relocated to Patrickswell, County Limerick. His father, John Foley, was an All-Ireland medal winner in the junior grade with Limerick in 1941. Foley enjoyed All-Ireland success with the CBS Sexton Street team in 1966, while simultaneously joining the Patrickswell senior team. In a club career that spanned 25 years he won two Munster medals and eleven county senior championship medals. Foley was an All-Ireland runner-up on one occasion.

Foley enjoyed an unsuccessful underage career at minor and under-21 levels with Limerick before making his senior debut during the 1970-71 league. Over the course of the next thirteen seasons he won one All-Ireland medal as Limerick won the title after a long absence in 1973. Foley also won four Munster medals, one National Hurling League medal and was chosen as an All-Star in 1973. He played his last game for Limerick in June 1983.

Foley was chosen on the Munster inter-provincial team for four consecutive years between 1972 and 1975, however, he failed to win a Railway Cup medal.

== Career statistics ==
Team	Season	Munster		All-Ireland		Total	
Team	Season	Apps	Score	Apps	Score	Apps	Score
Limerick	1971	3	0-02	0	0-00	3	0-02
Limerick	1972	1	0-00	0	0-00	1	0-00
Limerick	1973	2	0-00	2	0-00	4	0-00
Limerick	1974	2	0-00	1	0-00	3	0-00
Limerick	1975	3	0-00	0	0-00	3	0-00
Limerick	1976	2	0-02	0	0-00	2	0-02
Limerick	1977	1	0-00	0	0-00	1	0-00
Limerick	1978	2	0-03	0	0-00	2	0-03
Limerick	1979	3	0-01	0	0-00	3	0-01
Limerick	1980	2	0-01	1	0-00	3	0-01
Limerick	1981	3	0-01	1	0-00	4	0-01
Limerick	1982	1	0-00	0	0-00	1	0-00
Limerick	1983	2	0-01	0	0-00	2	0-01
Total		27	0-11	5	0-00	32	0-11

== Honours ==
CBS Sexton Street

- Dr. Croke Cup (1): 1966
- Dr. Harty Cup (3): 1965, 1966, 1967

Patrickswell

- Munster Senior Club Hurling Championship (2): 1988, 1990
- Limerick Senior Hurling Championship (11): 1966, 1969, 1970, 1977, 1979, 1982, 1983, 1984, 1987, 1988, 1990

Limerick

- All-Ireland Senior Hurling Championship (1): 1973
- Munster Senior Hurling Championship (4): 1973, 1974 (c), 1980 (c), 1981
- National Hurling League (1): 1970-71

Sporting positions
Preceded by Éamonn Grimes	Limerick Senior Hurling Captain; 1974	Succeeded by Éamonn Grimes
Preceded by	Limerick Senior Hurling Captain; 1978	Succeeded by Pat Hartigan
Preceded by Pat Hartigan	Limerick Senior Hurling Captain; 1980	Succeeded by Paudie Fitzmaurice
