= Jim Roche (hurler) =

Irish hurler

Personal information
- Native name: Séamus de Róiste (Irish)
- Height: 5 ft 11 in (180 cm)

Sport
- Sport: Hurling
- Position: Left wing-forward
Club
- Years: Club
- Croom
Club titles
- Limerick titles: 2
Inter-county
- Years: County
- Limerick
Inter-county titles
- Munster titles: 5
- All-Irelands: 3
- NHL: 5

James Roche (11 June 1910 – 23 April 1980) was an Irish hurler who played as a left wing-forward for the Limerick senior team.

Roche joined the team during the 1933 championship and was a regular member of the starting fifteen until his retirement almost a decade later. During that time he won three All-Ireland medals, five Munster medals and five National Hurling League medals. Roche was an All-Ireland runner-up on two occasions.

At club level Roche played with Croom.

Sporting positions
Preceded by Mick Mackey	Limerick Senior Hurling Captain; 1941	Succeeded by
