= Ballyduff, County Waterford =

Village in County Waterford, Ireland

Ballyduff Baile Dubh
- Village
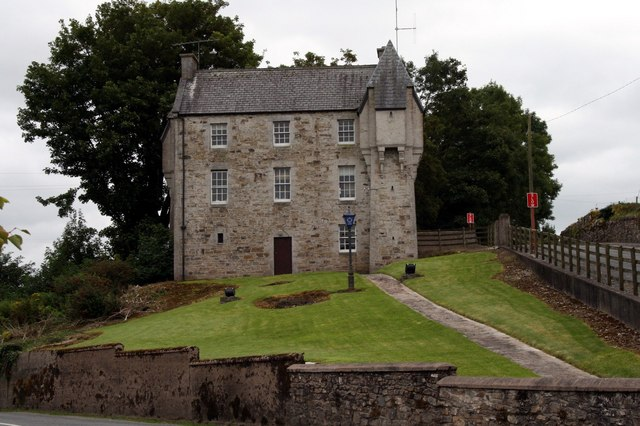
- Former Garda station in Ballyduff

- Location in Ireland
- Coordinates: 52°08′52″N 8°03′11″W
- Country: Ireland
- Province: Munster
- County: County Waterford
- Time zone: UTC+0 (WET)
  - Summer (DST): UTC-1 (IST (WEST))

Ballyduff (Irish: Baile Dubh, meaning 'black village') is a village in County Waterford, Ireland. It is also a parish in the Roman Catholic Diocese of Waterford and Lismore.

Historical maps mark the location of Ballyduff Castle in ruins. It was built in 1627 by the carpenter Andrew Tucker for the Earl of Cork. The Drew family gained possession of it later in the 17th century.

== Location and access ==
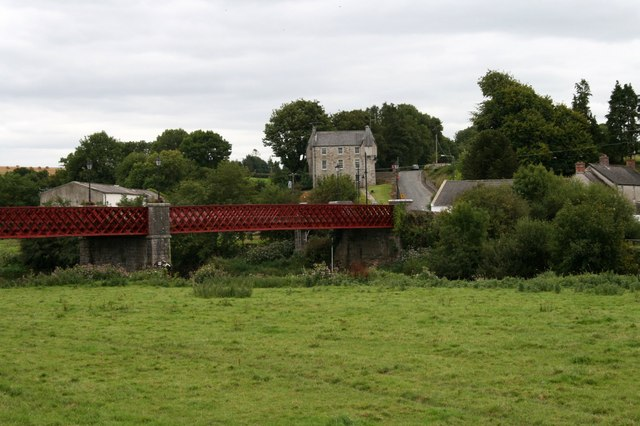
Bridge over Blackwater River

Ballyduff is approximately 9.8 kilometres (6 mi) west of Lismore, County Waterford and 17 kilometres (10 mi) east of Fermoy, County Cork. The village is located on the River Blackwater, which is spanned by the late 19th century Ballyduff Bridge.

The former Ballyduff railway station (opened in 1872 and closed in 1967) was located on the Waterford to Mallow line. It was served by the Rosslare to Cork boat train.

Bus routes which serve the area include Local Link Waterford services on certain days. Until 2010, Ballyduff was served by Bus Éireann route 366.

== Amenities ==
Ballyduff has a Roman Catholic church, a parish hall (old school hall) and a national school.

The local Gaelic Athletic Association club, Ballyduff Upper GAA, was named "club of the year" in 2005.
