= Croom, County Limerick =

Village in County Limerick, Ireland

Croom Cromadh
- Village
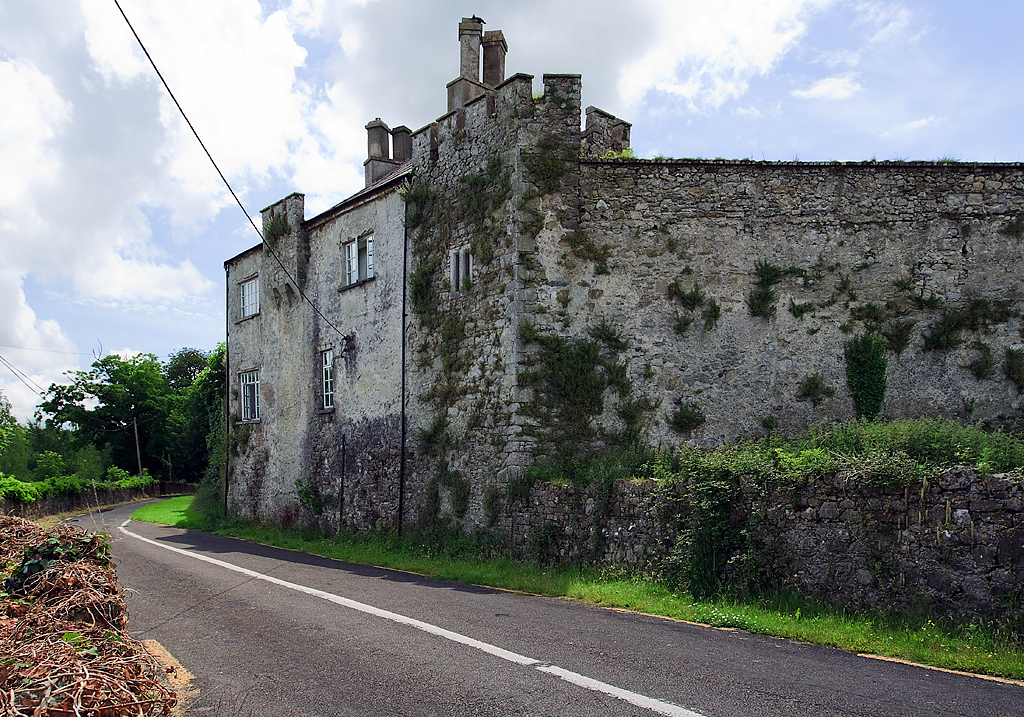
- Croom Castle overlooks the River Maigue

- Location in Ireland
- Coordinates: 52°31′17″N 8°43′14″W
- Country: Ireland
- Province: Munster
- County: County Limerick
- Elevation: 25 m (82 ft)

Population (2022)
  - Total: 1,240
- Irish Grid Reference: R509411

Croom (Irish: Cromadh) is a village in County Limerick, Ireland. It is located just off the N20 (which has bypassed the town since 2001) on the River Maigue. It is 8 km southeast of Adare on the N20. The village is in a townland and civil parish of the same name.

== History ==
Cromadh (now Croom) was a village in the territory of the Uí Fidgenti, and one of the seats of the O’Donovans of the Ui Fidgheinte, which flourished from the late 4th century to the mid 12th century. A hermitage, Dísert Óengusa, was founded nearby by Óengus of Tallaght around the year AD 780. The townland is located on the River Maigue, which although now having a tidal flow only to Adare, in ancient years the river had a tidal flow past Croom, making it a transit route for the Viking ships traversing inland from the Shannon during the 9th and 10th centuries. Contacts arising along the Maigue River between Danish Vikings and the Uí Donnabháins provide an insight into the alliance between the two groups in the late 10th century.

John O’Donovan claimed in an appendix to the Annals of the Four Masters that Croom derived its name from Ancrom O'Donovan Crom Ua Donnabáin, who was slain in Innis Beale Antha Dos (now Broadford) in 1254, based on the similarity of Ancrom with Crom. However, that claim has been thoroughly discredited.

The earliest mention of Cromadh in the historical annals was in 1151, when "A great predatory excursion was made by Ruaidhrí, son of Toirdhealbhach Ua Conchobhair, into Thomond; and he carried away many cows, and burned Cromadh". This event took place only three years after Turlogh O’Brien, King of Munster in 1148, and whom alternatively allied with and opposed Ruaidhrí Ua Conchobhair, defeated the Danes at the nearby fort of Rathmore. The burning of Croom in 1151 should be viewed in the larger context of leading powers continuing to punish and push the O’Donovans with their Danish alliances from their historical territory, which continued for another century as new Anglo Saxon powers arose from the Fitzgeralds, Butlers, Roches and whom competed with the O’Briens, O’Connors and MacCarthys for the Ui Fidgheinte (Ui Chairpre and Ui Chonaill) territories.

Ultimately, in the early 13th century, the lands surrounding Croom were given to the Fitzgeralds of Kildare. The Earls of Kildare continued to administer and build in the area of Croom through the end of the 16th century, and the competition for control of the Croom area was reduced to regional contests between the Earls of Desmond and the Earls of Kildare. Both houses associated their war cries with their territory: the war cry of the Geraldines of Kildare was Cromadh-abú ('Victory to Croom'), with various spellings Croom Abú. For comparison, the war-cry of the Desmond Geraldines was Seanaid-abú, associated with Shannid Castle, or Shannid Forever.

== Places of interest ==
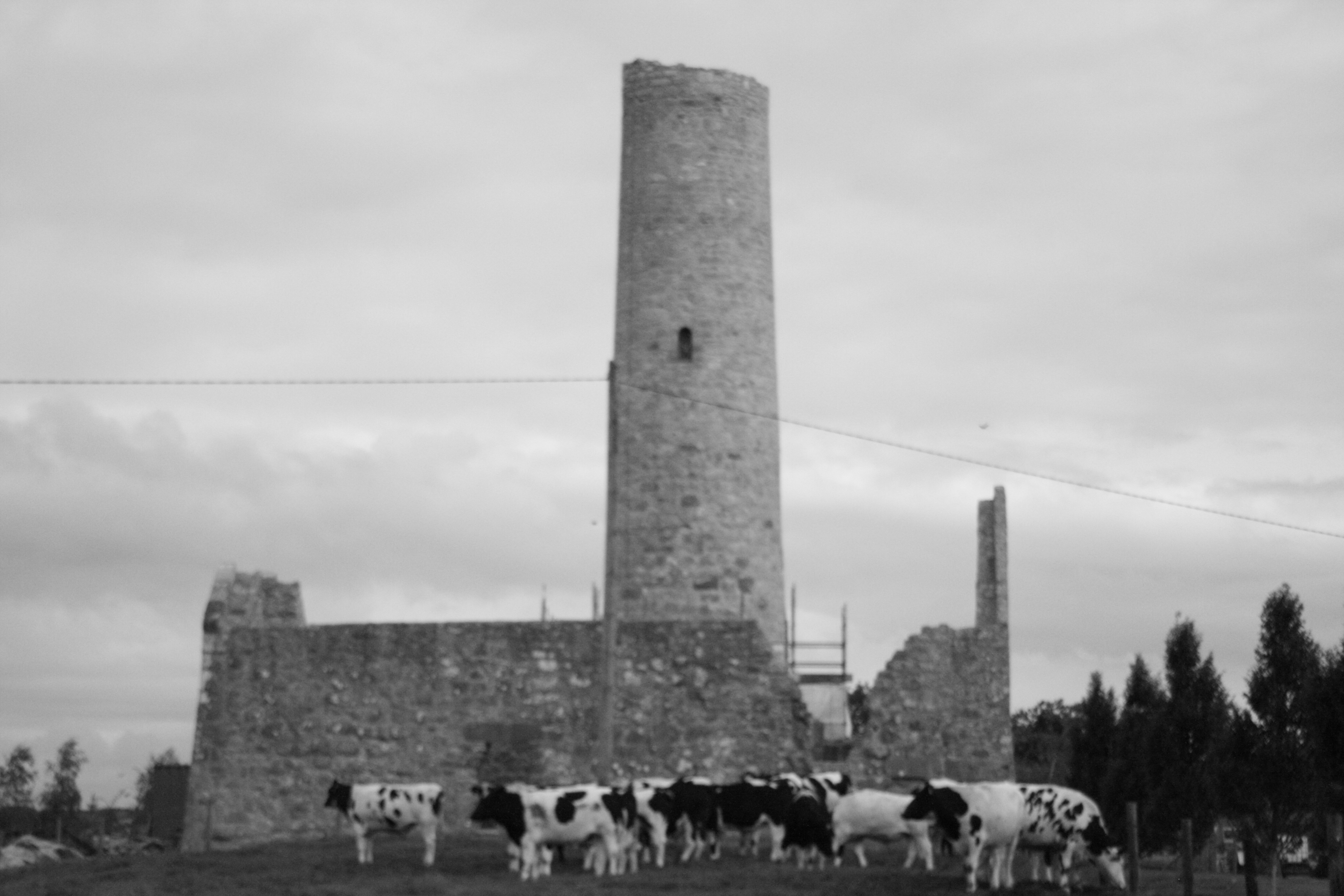
The round tower

Croom is home to Croom Castle, rebuilt by the FitzGeralds and Fitzmaurices from an earlier O'Donovan fortress, which may or may not have first been destroyed. In any case, it was restored in the 19th century. In the 18th century, it was the meeting-place of the "Maigue Poets".

West of Croom are the ruins of a 15th-century church (National Monument) and a round tower (12th century), the top part of which is missing. To the east is Croom Hospital which began life in 1852 as a workhouse, and became a hospital in 1924. Along the river Maigue is a ruin mill along with a newer mill, built by Henry Lyons in 1788 and was operational until 1927. In late 2014, a new Civic Centre was opened which includes a restaurant, library, public computers and function hall.

== Transport ==
Croom railway station opened on 1 August 1862, closed for passenger traffic on 31 December 1934 and for goods traffic on 9 September 1963, finally closing altogether on 27 March 1967.

The town is bypassed by the N20 Croom Bypass (2001). Bus Eireann provides public transport between Croom, Limerick and Charleville.

== Sport ==
The thoroughbred horse stud Islanmore Stud is on the south side of the village. The original 18th-century house was built for a younger brother of the Earl of Dunraven.

The local GAA club is Croom GAA. Croom United F.C. is a soccer club in the area.

== Education ==
Croom has two schools, a primary school named "St. Marys" and a secondary school named "Coláiste Chiaráin".

== See also ==
- List of towns and villages in County Limerick
