= Mike Casey (hurler) =

Irish hurler (born 1995)

Personal information
- Native name: Mícheál Ó Cathasaigh (Irish)
- Born: 25 October 1995 (age 31) Caherdavin, Limerick, Ireland
- Occupation: Teacher
- Height: 5 ft 6 in (168 cm)

Sport
- Sport: Hurling
- Position: Full-back
Club
- Years: Club
- 2013-present: Na Piarsaigh
Club titles
- Limerick titles: 6
- Munster titles: 3
- All-Ireland Titles: 1
College
- Years: College
- 2014-2018: University of Limerick
College titles
- Fitzgibbon titles: 1
Inter-county*
| Years | County | Apps (scores) |
| 2016-present | Limerick | 47 (0-02) |
Inter-county titles
- Munster titles: 6
- All-Irelands: 5
- NHL: 4
- All Stars: 0
- *Inter County team apps and scores correct as of 21:23, 19 July 2026.

Michael L. Casey (born 25 October 1995) is an Irish hurler who plays as a full-back for club side Na Piarsaigh and at inter-county level with the Limerick senior hurling team. His brother, Peter Casey, also plays for both teams.

== Playing career ==
=== College ===
Casey first came to prominence as a hurler with Ardscoil Rís in Limerick. On 22 February 2014, he won a Harty Cup medal following a 2–13 to 0–04 defeat of Scoil na Trionoide Naofa.

=== University ===
During his studies at the University of Limerick, Casey was selected for the college's senior hurling team on a number of occasions. On 24 February 2018, he was introduced as a substitute when the university defeated DCU Dóchás Éireann by 2–21 to 2–15 to win the Fitzgibbon Cup.

=== Club ===
Casey joined the Na Piarsaigh club at a young age and played in all grades at juvenile and underage levels, enjoying championship success in the under-16, minor and under-21 grades. He made his senior championship debut for the club as a seventeen-year-old in 2013.

On 6 October 2013, Casey was at left corner-back when Na Piarsaigh defeated Adare by 0–14 to 0–12 to win the Limerick Senior Championship. Team manager Seán Stack later said that Casey "was definitely man of the match for me". Casey retained his place at corner-back for the subsequent Munster Championship, which culminated with him winning a provincial medal after a 4–14 to 0–08 defeat of Sixmilebridge in the final.

Casey won a second Limerick Championship medal on 11 October 2015 after a 1–22 to 4–12 defeat of Patrickswell in the final. Later that season he won a second Munster medal after a 2–18 to 2–11 defeat of Ballygunner. On 17 March 2016, Casey won an All-Ireland medal when Na Piarsaigh defeated Ruairí Óg by 2–25 to 2–14 in the final.

On 15 October 2017, Casey won a third Limerick Championship medal when Na Piarsaigh defeated Kilmallock by 1–22 to 2–14 in the final. He later won a third Munster Championship medal when Na Piarsaigh defeated Ballygunner by 3–15 to 2–10 in the final. On 17 March 2018, Casey was at full-back when Na Piarsaigh were defeated by Cuala in the All-Ireland final.

On 27 October 2018, Casey won a fourth Limerick Championship medal following Na Piarsaigh's 2–22 to 3–10 defeat of Doon.

=== Inter-county ===
==== Minor and under-21 ====
Casey first played for Limerick at minor level. On 23 July 2013, he was introduced as a substitute in the 39th minute when Limerick won their first Munster Championship title in 29 years after a 1–20 to 4–08 defeat of Waterford in the final.

Casey subsequently joined the Limerick under-21 hurling team in 2015 and won a Munster Championship medal after a 0–22 to 0–19 defeat of Clare in the final. On 12 September 2015, Casey was at left corner-back when Limerick defeated Wexford in the All-Ireland final.

==== Senior ====
Casey joined the Limerick senior hurling team in January 2016. He was released from the panel prior to the start of the Munster Championship.

On 12 February 2017, Casey made his senior debut at left corner-back in a National League defeat by Wexford. Later that season he made his first championship start in a 3–17 to 2-16 Munster Championship semi-final defeat by Clare.

On 19 August 2018, Casey was at full-back when Limerick won their first All-Ireland title in 45 years after a 3–16 to 2–18 defeat of Galway in the final. He ended the season by being nominated for an All-Star Award.

On 31 March 2019, Casey started Limerick's National League final meeting with Waterford on the bench. He was introduced as a half-time substitute for Tom Condon and collected a winners' medal following the 1–24 to 0–19 victory. On 30 June 2019, Casey won a Munster Championship medal at full-back following Limerick's 2–26 to 2–14 defeat of Tipperary in the final. He ended the year by being nominated for a second All-Star award.

== Career statistics ==
As of match played 19 July 2026.

| Team | Year | National League | | | Munster | | All-Ireland | | Total | |
| Team | Year | Division | Apps | Score | Apps | Score | Apps | Score | Apps | Score |
|---|---|---|---|---|---|---|---|---|---|---|
| Limerick | 2016 | Division 1B | 0 | 0-00 | — | | — | | 0 | 0-00 |
| Limerick | 2017 | Division 1B | 5 | 0-00 | 1 | 0-00 | 1 | 0-00 | 7 | 0-00 |
| Limerick | 2018 | Division 1B | 0 | 0-00 | 4 | 0-00 | 4 | 0-00 | 8 | 0-00 |
| Limerick | 2019 | Division 1A | 2 | 0-00 | 5 | 0-00 | 1 | 0-00 | 8 | 0-00 |
| Limerick | 2020 | Division 1A | 4 | 0-00 | 0 | 0-00 | 0 | 0-00 | 4 | 0-00 |
| | 2021 | | 0 | 0-00 | — | | — | | 0 | 0-00 |
| | 2022 | | 1 | 0-00 | 5 | 0-00 | 2 | 0-00 | 8 | 0-00 |
| | 2023 | | 4 | 0-01 | 5 | 0-00 | 2 | 0-00 | 11 | 0-01 |
| | 2024 | | 3 | 0-01 | 3 | 0-00 | 1 | 0-00 | 7 | 0-01 |
| | 2025 | | 4 | 0-00 | 5 | 0-01 | 1 | 0-00 | 10 | 0-01 |
| | 2026 | | 4 | 0-01 | 5 | 0-01 | 2 | 0-00 | 12 | 0-02 |
| Career total | | | 27 | 0-03 | 33 | 0-02 | 14 | 0-00 | 74 | 0-05 |

== Honours ==
Ardscoil Rís

- Dr Harty Cup (1): 2014

University of Limerick

- Fitzgibbon Cup (1): 2018

Na Piarsaigh

- All-Ireland Senior Club Hurling Championship: 2016
- Munster Senior Club Hurling Championship: 2013, 2015, 2017
- Limerick Senior Hurling Championship: 2013, 2015, 2017, 2018, 2020, 2022

Limerick

- All-Ireland Senior Hurling Championship: 2018, 2020, 2022, 2023
- Munster Senior Hurling Championship: 2019, 2020, 2022, 2023
- National Hurling League: 2019, 2020, 2023
- All-Ireland Under-21 Hurling Championship: 2015
- Munster Under-21 Hurling Championship: 2015
- Munster Minor Hurling Championship: 2013
