= Conor Boylan =

Irish hurler (born 1998)

Personal information
- Native name: Conchúr Ó Baíolláin (Irish)
- Born: 22 March 1998 (age 28) Caherdavin, Limerick, Ireland
- Occupation: Student
- Height: 6 ft 3 in (191 cm)

Sport
- Sport: Hurling
- Position: Left wing-forward
Club
- Years: Club
- 2015–present: Na Piarsaigh
Club titles
- Limerick titles: 4
- Munster titles: 2
- All-Ireland Titles: 1
College
- Years: College
- 2017–present: University College Cork
College titles
- Fitzgibbon titles: 2
Inter-county*
Years	County	Apps (scores)
2018–present	Limerick	20 (1-03)
Inter-county titles
- Munster titles: 6
- All-Irelands: 3
- NHL: 3
- All Stars: 0
- *Inter County team apps and scores correct as of 19:55, 09 June 2024.

Conor Boylan (born 22 March 1998) is an Irish hurler who plays for Limerick Senior Championship club Na Piarsaigh and at inter-county level with the Limerick senior hurling team. He usually lines out as a left wing-forward.

== Playing career ==
=== Ardscoil Rís ===
Boylan first came to prominence as a hurler with Ardscoil Rís in Limerick. On 20 February 2016, he was at right wing-forward when Ardscoil Rís won the Harty Cup title after an 0–11 to 0–08 defeat of Our Lady's Secondary School from Templemore in the final.

=== University College Cork ===
On 23 February 2019, Boylan was a substitute for University College Cork when they faced Mary Immaculate College in the Fitzgibbon Cup final. He remained on the bench for the 2–21 to 0–13 victory.

Boylan played in a second successive Fitzgibbon Cup final on 12 February 2020. Lining out at centre-forward, he ended the game with a second successive winners' medal after the 0–18 to 2–11 defeat of the Institute of Technology, Carlow.

=== Na Piarsaigh ===
Boylan joined the Na Piarsaigh club at a young age and played in all grades at juvenile and underage levels, enjoying championship success in the under-16, minor and under-21 grades.

Boylan won a Limerick Championship medal as a non-playing substitute on 11 October 2015 after a 1–22 to 4–12 defeat of Patrickswell in the final. Later that season he won a Munster Championship medal, also as a non-playing substitute, after a 2–18 to 2–11 defeat of Ballygunner. On 17 March 2016, Boylan was on the bench when he won an All-Ireland medal when Na Piarsaigh defeated Ruairí Óg by 2–25 to 2–14 in the final.

On 15 October 2017, Boylan won a second Limerick Championship medal after being introduced as a substitute when Na Piarsaigh defeated Kilmallock by 1–22 to 2–14 in the final. He later won a second Munster Championship medal from midfield when Na Piarsaigh defeated Ballygunner by 3–15 to 2–10 in the final. On 17 March 2018, Boylan played as a substitute when Na Piarsaigh were defeated by Cuala in the All-Ireland final.

On 27 October 2018, Boylan won a third Limerick Championship medal at left wing-forward following Na Piarsaigh's 2–22 to 3–10 defeat of Doon.

=== Limerick ===
==== Minor and under-21 ====
Boylan made his first appearance for the Limerick minor team on 8 April 2015. He was introduced as a substitute in a 2–20 to 1–13 defeat by Cork in the Munster Championship. On 12 July Boylan was again introduced as a substitute in Limerick's 0–20 to 0–17 defeat by Tipperary in the Munster final.

Boylan was eligible for the minor grade again in 2016 and made his first start on 6 April in a 2–11 to 1–08 defeat of Clare. On 10 July, he scored two points from left wing-forward when Limerick suffered a 1–24 to 0–10 defeat by Tipperary in a second successive Munster final. On 4 September, Boyle was at right corner-forward when Limerick suffered a second defeat by Tipperary in the All-Ireland final at Croke Park.

Boylan subsequently progressed onto the Limerick under-21 hurling team and won a Munster Championship medal on 26 July 2017 after a coming on as a substitute in Limerick's 0–16 to 1–11 defeat of Cork in the final. On 9 September, he was introduced as a 38th-minute substitute for Cian Lynch in Limerick's 0–17 to 0–11 defeat of Kilkenny in the All-Ireland final.

==== Senior ====
Boylan made his first appearance for the Limerick senior team on 14 December 2018. He was introduced as a 55th-minute substitute for Barry O'Connell in a 4–14 to 2–17 defeat by Tipperary in the Munster League. On 2 February 2019, he made his first start at left wing-forward in a 1–21 to 1–14 defeat of Tipperary.

== Career statistics ==
As of match played 26 May 2024.

Team	Year	National League			Munster		All-Ireland		Total	
Team	Year	Division	Apps	Score	Apps	Score	Apps	Score	Apps	Score
Limerick	2019	Division 1A	4	2–04	1	0–00	0	0–00	5	2–04
Limerick	2020	Division 1A	1	0–00	0	0–00	0	0–00	1	0–00
Limerick	2021	Division 1A	4	0–01	2	0–00	1	0–00	7	0–01
	2022		3	0–00	5	1-01	2	0–01	10	1–02
	2023		5	1–00	3	0–00	1	0–00	9	1–00
	2024		5	0–02	5	0–01	0	0–00	10	0–03
Career total			22	3–07	16	1–02	4	0–01	42	4–10

== Honours ==
Ardscoil Rís

- Dr Harty Cup (1): 2016

University College Cork

- Fitzgibbon Cup (2): 2019, 2020

Na Piarsaigh

- All-Ireland Senior Club Hurling Championship (1): 2016
- Munster Senior Club Hurling Championship (2): 2015, 2017
- Limerick Senior Hurling Championship (4): 2015, 2017, 2018, 2020

Limerick

- All-Ireland Senior Hurling Championship (3): 2020, 2021, 2022
- Munster Senior Hurling Championship (5): 2019, 2020, 2021, 2022, 2023
- National Hurling League (3): 2019, 2020, 2023
- All-Ireland Under-21 Hurling Championship (1): 2017
- Munster Under-21 Hurling Championship (1): 2017
