= Kevin Downes (hurler) =

Irish hurler (born 1991)

Personal information
- Native name: Caoimhín Ó Dubháin (Irish)
- Born: 14 October 1991 (age 35) Coonagh, County Limerick, Ireland
- Occupation: Account manager
- Height: 6 ft 2 in (188 cm)

Sport
- Sport: Hurling
- Position: Full-forward
Club
- Years: Club
- 2009-present: Na Piarsaigh
Club titles
- Limerick titles: 8
- Munster titles: 4
- All-Ireland Titles: 1
College
- Years: College
- 2010-2014: NUI Galway
College titles
- Fitzgibbon titles: 0
Inter-county*
Years	County	Apps (scores)
2011-present	Limerick	21 (3-22)
Inter-county titles
- Munster titles: 1
- All-Irelands: 1
- NHL: 0
- All Stars: 0
- *Inter County team apps and scores correct as of 23:17, 24 August 2018.

Kevin Downes (born 14 October 1991) is an Irish hurler who plays for Limerick Senior Championship club Na Piarsaigh and at inter-county level with the Limerick senior hurling team. He usually lines out as a full-forward.

== Playing career ==
=== Ardscoil Rís ===
Downes first came to prominence as a hurler with Ardscoil Rís in Limerick. Having played in every grade as a hurler, he was full-forward on the college's senior hurling team. On 11 March 2010, Downes scored 1-02 from play when Ardscoil Rís defeated Thurles CBS in the final of the Harty Cup. On 3 April, he was switched to left wing-forward for the All-Ireland final against St. Kieran's College. Downes was held scoreless in the 2–11 to 2–08 defeat.

=== NUI Galway ===
During his studies at NUI Galway, Downes was selected for the college's senior hurling team. He was a regular member of the starting fifteen during the Fitzgibbon Cup and also served as chairman of the club.

=== Na Piarsaigh ===
Downes joined the Na Piarsaigh club at a young age and played in all grades at juvenile and underage levels, enjoying championship success in the under-21 grades as a dual player before eventually joining the club's top adult teams.

On 2 October 2011, Downes scored 1-01 from full-forward in Na Piarsaigh's 2–18 to 0–13 defeat of Adare to win their very first Limerick Championship title. On 4 December 2012, he won a Munster Championship medal following a 1–13 to 0–09 defeat of Crusheen in the final.

After surrendering their titles the following year, Downes won a second Limerick Championship medal after lining out at centre-forward when Na Piarsaigh defeated Adare by 0–14 to 0–12 on 6 October 2013. He was retained at centre-forward for the subsequent Munster Championship, which culminated on 24 November 2014 with him winning a second provincial medal after scoring a goal in the 4–14 to 0–08 defeat of Sixmilebridge in the final.

Downes won a third Limerick Championship medal on 11 October 2015 after a 1–22 to 4–12 defeat of Patrickswell in the final. He top scored with 1-05 and ended the game as man of the match. Downes missed Na Piarsaigh's subsequent Munster Championship final defeat of Ballygunner due to a concussion. On 17 March 2016, he won an All-Ireland Championship medal after scoring 1–02 in Na Piarsaigh's 2–25 to 2–14 defeat of Ruairí Óg in the final.

On 15 October 2017, Downes won a fourth Limerick Championship medal when Na Piarsaigh defeated Kilmallock by 1–22 to 2–14 in the final. He won a third Munster Championship medal on 19 November when Na Piarsaigh defeated Ballygunner by 3–15 to 2–10 in the final. On 17 March 2018, Downes was named at full-forward by played much of the match at left corner-forward when Na Piarsaigh suffered a 2–17 to 1–17 defeat by Cuala in the All-Ireland final.

On 27 October 2018, Downes won a fifth Limerick Championship medal following Na Piarsaigh's 2–22 to 3–10 defeat of Doon in the final.

=== Limerick ===
==== Minor and under-21 ====
Downes first played for Limerick when he was selected for the minor team in advance of the 2008 Munster Championship. He made his first appearance on 30 April when he scored seven points in a 3–21 to 1–12 defeat by Tipperary. Limerick's championship ended with a defeat by Cork in a play-off, however, Downes ended the season as Limerick's top scorer.

Downes was eligible for the minor grade again the following year. After a second consecutive defeat to Tipperary at the quarter-final stage, he played his last game for Limerick on 5 June 2009 in a 4–08 to 1–14 defeat by Waterford in a play-off.

After progressing onto the Limerick under-21 team, he made his first appearance on 14 July 2010 when he came on as a substitute and scored two points in Limerick's 1–15 to 1–12 defeat by Clare in the Munster Championship.

Downes broke onto the starting fifteen of the Limerick under-21 team during the 2011 Munster Championship and was appointed captain of the team. On 3 August, he scored a point from full-forward when Limerick defeated Cork by 4–20 to 1–27 after extra-time to win the Munster Championship.

Downes played his last game for the Limerick under-21 team on 18 July 2012. He scored two points from full-forward in a 1–16 to 1–11 defeat by Tipperary in the Munster Championship semi-final.

==== Senior ====
On 13 February 2011, Downes made his first appearance for the Limerick senior team. He scored a point in Limerick's 2–09 to 0–06 defeat of Clare in the National League. On 30 April, he scored 1-02 from play when Limerick defeated Clare by 4–12 to 2–13 to win the Division 2 title. Downes made his first championship appearance on 12 June. He top scored for Limerick 2–01 in the 3–15 to 3–14 defeat by Waterford.

On 14 July 2013, Downes lined out in his first Munster Championship final. He started the game on the bench but was introduced as a 65th-minute substitute and scored two points in Limerick's 0–24 to 0–15 defeat of Cork and a first title in 17 years.

On 2 August 2016, Downes tore his cruciate in a club football game. The injury ruled him out of Limerick's 2017 league and championship campaigns.

Downes rejoined the Limerick senior panel in 2018. On 19 August 2018, he was an unused substitute when Limerick won their first All-Ireland title in 45 years after a 3–16 to 2–18 defeat of Galway in the final.

On 2 February 2019, Downes made his first appearance for Limerick in over 30 months when he lined out at full-forward in Limerick's 1–21 to 1–14 defeat of Clare in the National League.

== Career statistics ==
=== Inter-county ===
As of match played 24 March 2019.

Team	Year	National League			Munster		All-Ireland		Total	
Team	Year	Division	Apps	Score	Apps	Score	Apps	Score	Apps	Score
Limerick	2011	Division 2	7	5-07	1	2-01	3	0-04	11	7-12
Limerick	2012	Division 1B	4	0-02	1	0-02	2	0-02	7	0-06
Limerick	2013	Division 1B	6	0-11	2	0-02	1	0-01	9	0-14
Limerick	2014	Division 1B	5	0-07	2	0-03	2	0-00	9	0-10
Limerick	2015	Division 1B	0	0-00	2	0-00	2	1-03	4	1-03
Limerick	2016	Division 1B	2	1-02	1	0-00	2	0-04	5	1-06
Limerick	2017	Division 1B	—		—		—		—	
Limerick	2018	Division 1B	0	0-00	0	0-00	0	0-00	0	0-00
Limerick	2019	Division 1A	1	0-00	0	0-00	0	0-00	1	0-00
Career total			25	6-29	9	2-08	12	1-14	46	9-51

== Honours ==
Na Piarsaigh

- All-Ireland Senior Club Hurling Championship (1): 2016
- Munster Senior Club Hurling Championship (4): 2011, 2013, 2015, 2017
- Limerick Senior Hurling Championship (8): 2011, 2013, 2015, 2017, 2018, 2020, 2022, 2023
- Limerick Under-21 Hurling Championship (1): 2010
- Limerick Under-21 Football B Championship (1): 2011
- Limerick Under-21 Football All County Championship (1): 2011

Limerick

- All-Ireland Senior Hurling Championship (1): 2018
- Munster Senior Hurling Championship (1): 2013
- National Hurling League Division 2 (1): 2011
- Munster Under-21 Hurling Championship (1): 2011 (c)
