= Adrian Breen (hurler) =

Irish hurler

Personal information
- Native name: Dreáin Ó Braoin (Irish)
- Born: 28 May 1992 (age 34) Corbally, Limerick, Ireland
- Occupation: Pharmaceutical employee
- Height: 6 ft 1 in (185 cm)

Sport
- Sport: Hurling
- Position: Left Wing/Corner forward
Club
- Years: Club
- Na Piarsaigh
Club titles
- Limerick titles: 8
- Munster titles: 4
- All-Ireland Titles: 1
College
- Years: College
- 2010-2014: University College Cork
College titles
- Fitzgibbon titles: 1
Inter-county*
Years	County	Apps (scores)
2015; 2020-	Limerick	4 (1-02)
Inter-county titles
- Munster titles: 3
- All-Irelands: 2
- NHL: 1
- All Stars: 0
- *Inter County team apps and scores correct as of 20:18, 13 December 2020.

Adrian Breen (born 28 May 1992) is an Irish hurler who plays for Limerick Senior Championship club Na Piarsaigh and at inter-county level with the Limerick senior hurling team. He usually lines out as a right wing-forward.

== Career statistics ==
As of match played 13 June 2021.

Team	Year	National League			Munster		All-Ireland		Total	
Team	Year	Division	Apps	Score	Apps	Score	Apps	Score	Apps	Score
Limerick	2015	Division 1B	4	0-01	0	0-00	1	1-00	5	1-01
Limerick	2016	Division 1B	—		—		—		—	
Limerick	2017	Division 1B	—		—		—		—	
Limerick	2018	Division 1B	—		—		—		—	
Limerick	2019	Division 1A	—		—		—		—	
Limerick	2020	Division 1A	0	0-00	1	0-01	2	0-01	3	0-02
	2021	Division 1A	4	0-04	0	0-00	0	0-00	4	0-04
Total			8	0-05	1	0-01	3	1-01	12	1-07

== Honours ==
Ardscoil Rís

- Dr Harty Cup (1): 2010

University College Cork

- Fitzgibbon Cup (1): 2013
- All-Ireland Freshers' Hurling Championship (1): 2011

Na Piarsaigh

- All-Ireland Senior Club Hurling Championship (1): 2016
- Munster Senior Club Hurling Championship (4): 2011, 2013, 2015, 2017
- Limerick Senior Hurling Championship (6): 2011, 2013, 2015, 2017, 2018, 2020

Limerick

- All-Ireland Senior Hurling Championship (1): 2020
- Munster Senior Hurling Championship (1): 2020
- National Hurling League (1): 2020
- Munster Senior Hurling League (1): 2020
- Munster Under-21 Hurling Championship (1): 2011
