= David Dempsey (hurler) =

Irish hurler (born 1995)

David Demspey
Personal information
- Native name: Daithí Ó Díomasaigh (Irish)
- Born: 13 May 1995 (age 31) Caherdavin, Limerick, Ireland
- Height: 6 ft 1 in (185 cm)

Sport
- Sport: Hurling
- Position: Left wing-forward
Club
- Years: Club
- Na Piarsaigh
Club titles
- Limerick titles: 5
- Munster titles: 3
- All-Ireland Titles: 2
College
- Years: College
- Limerick Institute of Technology
College titles
- Fitzgibbon titles: 0
Inter-county*
Years	County	Apps (scores)
2016-present	Limerick	9 (1-02)
Inter-county titles
- Munster titles: 2
- All-Irelands: 2
- NHL: 2
- All Stars: 0
- *Inter County team apps and scores correct as of 18:52, 15 December 2020.

David Dempsey (born 13 May 1995) is an Irish hurler who plays as a left wing-forward for club side Na Piarsaigh and at inter-county level with the Limerick senior hurling team.

== Playing career ==
=== College ===
Dempsey first came to prominence as a hurler with Ardscoil Rís in Limerick. Having played in every grade as a hurler, he was an unused substitute on 27 February 2011 when Ardscoil Rís retained the Harty Cup title after a 3–19 to 0–03 defeat of C.B.S. Charleville in the final.

=== University ===
During his studies at the Limerick Institute of Technology, Dempsey was selected for the college's senior hurling team for the Fitzgibbon Cup.

=== Club ===
Dempsey joined the Na Piarsaigh club at a young age and played in all grades at juvenile and underage levels, enjoying championship success in the under-16, minor and under-21 grades. He made his senior championship debut for the club as a seventeen-year-old in 2013.

On 6 October 2013, Dempsey was at right wing-forward when Na Piarsaigh defeated Adare by 0–14 to 0–12 to win the Limerick Senior Championship. He retained his place in the half-forward line for the subsequent Munster Championship, which culminated with him winning a provincial medal after a 4–14 to 0–08 defeat of Sixmilebridge in the final.

Dempsey won a second Limerick Championship medal on 11 October 2015 after a 1–22 to 4–12 defeat of Patrickswell in the final. Later that season he won a second Munster Championship medal after a 2–18 to 2–11 defeat of Ballygunner. On 17 March 2016, Dempsey won an All-Ireland medal when Na Piarsaigh defeated Ruairí Óg by 2–25 to 2–14 in the final.

On 15 October 2017, Dempsey won a third Limerick Championship medal when Na Piarsaigh defeated Kilmallock by 1–22 to 2–14 in the final. He later won a third Munster Championship medal when Na Piarsaigh defeated Ballygunner by 3–15 to 2–10 in the final. On 17 March 2018, Casey was named at left wing-forward but played at midfield when Na Piarsaigh were defeated by Cuala in the All-Ireland final.

On 27 October 2018, Dempsey won a fourth Limerick Championship medal following Na Piarsaigh's 2–22 to 3–10 defeat of Doon.

=== Inter-county ===
==== Minor and under-21 ====
Dempsey first played for Limerick at minor level. On 23 July 2013, he scored two points when Limerick won their first Munster Championship title in 29 years after a 1–20 to 4–08 defeat of Waterford in the final.

Dempsey subsequently joined the Limerick under-21 hurling team in 2015 and won a Munster Championship medal after a 0–22 to 0–19 defeat of Clare in the final. On 12 September 2015, Dempsey was at left wing-forward when Limerick defeated Wexford in the All-Ireland final.

==== Intermediate ====
In 2016, Dempsey joined the Limerick intermediate hurling team. On 6 July 2016, he was at right corner-forward when Limerick were defeated by Clare in the Munster final.

==== Senior ====
Dempsey joined the Limerick senior hurling team in January 2016. He was an unused substitute throughout the entire season.

Dempsey made his senior debut for Limerick on 12 February 2017 in a 1–14 to 0-14 National Hurling League defeat by Wexford. Later that season he made his first championship start, scoring 1–01 in a Munster Championship defeat by Clare.

On 19 August 2018, Dempsey was a member of the extended panel when Limerick won their first All-Ireland title in 45 years after a 3–16 to 2–18 defeat of Galway in the final.

On 31 March 2019, Dempsey was named on the bench for Limerick's National League final meeting with Waterford at Croke Park. He collected a winners' medal as a non-playing substitute in the 1–24 to 0–19 victory.

== Career statistics ==
As of match played 9 May 2021.

Team	Year	National League			Munster		All-Ireland		Total	
Team	Year	Division	Apps	Score	Apps	Score	Apps	Score	Apps	Score
Limerick	2016	Division 1B	0	0-00	0	0-00	0	0-00	0	0-00
Limerick	2017	Division 1B	5	1-03	1	1-01	1	0-00	7	2-04
Limerick	2018	Division 1B	0	0-00	4	0-01	0	0-00	4	0-01
Limerick	2019	Division 1A	4	0-01	1	0-00	0	0-00	5	0-01
Limerick	2020	Division 1A	5	2-07	2	0-00	0	0-00	7	2-07
	2021	Division 1A	1	0-00	0	0-00	0	0-00	1	0-00
Total			15	3-11	8	1-02	1	0-00	24	4-13

== Honours ==
Ardscoil Rís

- Harty Cup (1): 2011

Na Piarsaigh

- All-Ireland Senior Club Hurling Championship (1): 2016
- Munster Senior Club Hurling Championship (3): 2013, 2015, 2017
- Limerick Senior Hurling Championship (5): 2013, 2015, 2017, 2018, 2020

Limerick

- All-Ireland Senior Hurling Championship (2): 2018, 2020
- Munster Senior Hurling Championship (2): 2019, 2020
- National Hurling League (2): 2019, 2020
- All-Ireland Under-21 Hurling Championship (1): 2015
- Munster Under-21 Hurling Championship (1): 2015
- Munster Minor Hurling Championship (1): 2013
