= Shane Dowling (hurler) =

Limerick hurler (born 1993)

Personal information
- Native name: Seán Ó Dualaing (Irish)
- Nickname: The Dow
- Born: 21 February 1993 (age 33) Caherdavin, Limerick, Ireland
- Height: 6 ft 0 in (183 cm)

Sport
- Sport: Hurling
- Position: Half-forward, goalkeeper
Club
- Years: Club
- 2010–present: Na Piarsaigh
Club titles
- Limerick titles: 5
- Munster titles: 4
- All-Ireland Titles: 1
Inter-county*
Years	County	Apps (scores)
2012–	Limerick	33 (13-176)
Inter-county titles
- Munster titles: 2
- All-Irelands: 1
- NHL: 1
- All Stars: 1
- *Inter County team apps and scores correct as of 18:06, 25 May 2025.

Shane Dowling (born 21 February 1993) is an Irish hurler who plays as a goalkeeper for club side Na Piarsaigh and previously as a half-forward at inter-county level with the Limerick senior hurling team.

== Playing career ==
=== College ===
Dowling first came to prominence as a hurler with Ardscoil Rís in Limerick. Having played in every grade as a hurler, he was centre-forward on the college's senior hurling team. On 11 March 2010, Dowling scored a point from play when Ardscoil Rís defeated Thurles CBS in the final of the Harty Cup.

On 27 February 2011, Dowling was again at centre-forward when Ardscoil Rís retained the Harty Cup title after a 3–19 to 0–03 defeat of C.B.S. Charleville in the final.

=== Club ===
Dowling joined the Na Piarsaigh club at a young age and played in all grades at juvenile and underage levels, enjoying championship success in the under-16, minor and under-21 grades.

On 2 October 2011, Dowling scored 1-10 from right corner-forward in Na Piarsaigh's 2–18 to 0–13 defeat of Adare to win their first Limerick Championship. He later won a Munster Championship medal following a 1–13 to 0–09 defeat of Crusheen in the final.

After surrendering their titles the following year, Dowling won a second Limerick Championship medal at midfield when Na Piarsaigh defeated Adare by 0–14 to 0–12 on 6 October 2013. He was switched to full-forward for the subsequent Munster Championship, which culminated with him winning a second provincial medal after a 4–14 to 0–08 defeat of Sixmilebridge in the final.

Dowling won a third Limerick Championship medal on 11 October 2015 after a 1–22 to 4–12 defeat of Patrickswell in the final. Later that season he won a third Munster medal after scoring 1–04 in a 2–18 to 2–11 defeat of Ballygunner. On 17 March 2016, Dowling won an All-Ireland medal when Na Piarsaigh defeated Ruairí Óg by 2–25 to 2–14 in the final.

On 15 October 2017, Dowling won a fourth Limerick Championship medal when Na Piarsaigh defeated Kilmallock by 1–22 to 2–14 in the final. He was substituted in the 43rd minute after picking up an injury. Scans initially showed cartilage damage, but during surgery a fracture was also discovered inside his knee which ended his participation in the Munster Championship. Dowling's participation in the All-Ireland series was also in doubt, however, he was introduced as a substitute in the All-Ireland semi-final against Slaughtneil and set up a goal for Kevin Downes before scoring his own goal. On 17 March 2018, he was at midfield when Na Piarsaigh were defeated by Cuala in the All-Ireland final.

On 27 October 2018, Dowling won a fifth Limerick Championship medal after scoring 0–12 in Na Piarsaigh's 2–22 to 3–10 defeat of Doon. He coaches the under 14’ at his club and has brought them to win one county championships in under 13 and feile in under 14

=== Inter-county ===
==== Minor and under-21 ====
Dowling first played for Limerick at minor level as a sixteen-year-old. He made his first appearance for the team on 29 April 2009, replacing John Fitzgibbon at half-time in a 1–21 to 0–11 defeat by Tipperary. He was eligible for the minor grade for the following two seasons, however, Limerick faced respective defeats by Clare and Waterford.

In his final year on the minor team, Dowling was drafted onto the Limerick under-21 team. On 3 August 2011, he scored seven points, including six frees, when Limerick defeated Cork by 4–20 to 1–27 in the final of the Munster Championship.

Dowling was appointed captain of the Limerick under-21 hurling team during his fourth and final season on the team in 2014.

==== Senior ====
Dowling made his senior debut for Limerick on 25 February 2012 in a 2–24 to 1-13 National Hurling League defeat by Clare. Later that season he made his first Munster Championship appearance in a 2–20 to 1–19 defeat by Tipperary. On 30 June 2012, Dowling scored 3–09 in an All-Ireland Qualifier defeat of Antrim. It was the highest personal tally for any player in that year's championship.

After playing a number of games for Limerick after returning from club duty during the 2013 National League, Dowling was surprisingly dropped from the starting fifteen by team manager John Allen for the team's opening championship game against Tipperary. Recalling being left on the bench, he later said: "I took that very hard at the time. Growing up I was never a sub on any team I had ever played for so, at the time, John Allen was the demon, the big bad wolf. I genuinely thought my inter-county career was over. I was devastated." Dowling was introduced as a 49th-minute substitute for Séamus Hickey and scored two points in a three-point victory. On 14 July 2013, he scored three points from play after being introduced as a substitute in Limerick's 0–24 to 0–15 defeat of Cork in the Munster final.

Dowling returned to the Limerick starting fifteen under new joint-managers Dónal O'Grady and T. J. Ryan in 2014. After scoring 2–09 in Limerick's Munster Championship defeat of Tipperary on 1 June 2014, he later revealed how he had been the subject of an abusive text message: "Last week, the chairman of the club showed me a text message from a journalist in Limerick. I’ve no problem with someone voicing their opinion. That particular person personally abused me in that text message. I don’t say that lightly. Thank God, that we answered that today." On 24 October 2014, Dowling was named on the All-Star Team.

On 10 June 2018, Dowling's tally of 0–15 in a Munster Championship game allowed him to replace Gary Kirby as Limerick's all-time top championship scorer.

On 19 August 2018, Dowling scored a goal after coming on as a substitute when Limerick won their first All-Ireland title in 45 years after a 3–16 to 2–18 defeat of Galway in the final.

On 31 March 2019, Dowling started Limerick's National League final meeting with Waterford on the bench. He was introduced as a 64th-minute substitute for Tom Morrissey and collected a winners' medal following the 1–24 to 0–19 victory. On 30 June 2019, Dowling won his first Munster Championship medal in six years after coming on as a 66th-minute substitute for Gearóid Hegarty in Limerick's 2–26 to 2–14 defeat of Tipperary in the final.

On 2 July 2020, Dowling announced his retirement from inter-county hurling due to degenerative knee and cartilage issues.

In November 2024, it was announced that Dowling would come out of retirement to be part of the Limerick senior hurling panel as a goalkeeper after playing the last two years in goal for his club.

=== Inter-provincial ===
Dowling was selected for the Munster inter-provincial team for the first time on 17 February 2013. He later won a Railway Cup medal following a 1–22 to 0–15 defeat of Connacht in the final. Dowling was also selected for the Munster team in 2016.

== Career statistics ==
=== Club ===
As of 2 November 2025.

Team	Season	Limerick		Munster		All-Ireland		Total	
Team	Season	Apps	Score	Apps	Score	Apps	Score	Apps	Score
Na Piarsaigh	2010	5	2-17	—		—		5	2-17
Na Piarsaigh	2011	5	1-31	3	3-14	1	0-06	9	4-51
Na Piarsaigh	2012	5	3-37	—		—		5	3-37
Na Piarsaigh	2013	6	4-21	3	0-15	1	1-04	10	5-40
Na Piarsaigh	2014	7	3-42	—		—		7	3-42
Na Piarsaigh	2015	6	1-38	3	1-16	2	0-12	11	2-66
Na Piarsaigh	2016	5	3-15	—		—		5	3-15
Na Piarsaigh	2017	6	0-36	0	0-00	3	1-11	9	1-47
Na Piarsaigh	2018	7	1-65	2	1-09	—		9	2-74
Na Piarsaigh	2019	4	2-30	—		—		4	2-30
Na Piarsaigh	2020	—		—		—		—	
Na Piarsaigh	2021	—		—		—		—	
Na Piarsaigh	2022	—		—		—		—	
Na Piarsaigh	2023	7	0-03	1	0-00	—		8	0-03
Na Piarsaigh	2024	7	0-08	—		—		7	0-08
Na Piarsaigh	2025	7	1-00	1	0-00	—		8	1-00
Career total		77	21-343	13	5-54	7	2-33	97	28-430

=== Inter-county ===
As of match played 25 May 2025.

Team	Year	National League			Munster		All-Ireland		Total	
Team	Year	Division	Apps	Score	Apps	Score	Apps	Score	Apps	Score
Limerick	2012	Division 1B	4	3-24	1	0-08	4	4-21	9	7-53
Limerick	2013	Division 1B	5	0-10	2	0-05	1	0-06	8	0-21
Limerick	2014	Division 1B	3	1-15	2	2-21	2	2-15	7	5-51
Limerick	2015	Division 1B	4	1-20	2	1-18	2	1-07	8	3-45
Limerick	2016	Division 1B	2	1-07	1	0-09	2	0-20	5	1-36
Limerick	2017	Division 1B	4	1-33	1	0-07	1	0-08	6	1-48
Limerick	2018	Division 1B	0	0-00	2	0-19	3	2-05	5	2-24
Limerick	2019	Division 1A	5	1-10	5	0-07	1	1-00	11	2-17
	2025		4	0-00	1	0-00	0	0-00	5	0-00
Total			31	8-119	17	3-94	16	10-82	64	21-292

== Honours ==
Ardscoil Rís

- Dr Harty Cup (2): 2010, 2011

Na Piarsaigh

- All-Ireland Senior Club Hurling Championship (1): 2016
- Munster Senior Club Hurling Championship (4): 2011, 2013, 2015, 2017
- Limerick Senior Hurling Championship (5): 2011, 2013, 2015, 2017, 2018

Limerick

- All-Ireland Senior Hurling Championship (1): 2018
- Munster Senior Hurling Championship (1): 2013, 2019
- National Hurling League (1): 2019
- Munster Under-21 Hurling Championship (1): 2011

Munster

- Railway Cup (2): 2013, 2016

Individual

- GAA GPA All Stars Awards (1): 2014

Sporting positions
Preceded by Evan Loftus	Limerick minor hurling team manager 2023-2024	Succeeded by Donal O'Grady
