= William O'Donoghue =

Irish hurler

Personal information
- Native name: Liam Ó Donnchú (Irish)
- Nickname: The Terminator
- Born: 8 December 1994 (age 31) Caherdavin, Limerick, Ireland
- Occupation: Company director
- Height: 6 ft 5 in (196 cm)

Sport
- Sport: Hurling
- Position: Midfield
Club
- Years: Club
- 2013–: Na Piarsaigh
Club titles
- Limerick titles: 6
- Munster titles: 3
- All-Ireland Titles: 1
College
- Years: College
- 2013–2017: University of Limerick
College titles
- Fitzgibbon titles: 0
Inter-county*
Years	County	Apps (scores)
2017–	Limerick	54 (0–11)
Inter-county titles
- Munster titles: 7
- All-Irelands: 6
- NHL: 4
- All Stars: 3
- *Inter County team apps and scores correct as of 23:15, 30 October 2026.

William O'Donoghue (born 8 December 1994) is an Irish hurler who plays as a midfielder for club side Na Piarsaigh which he captains and at inter-county level with the Limerick senior team.

== Playing career ==
=== Club ===
O'Donoghue joined the Na Piarsaigh club at a young age and played in all grades at juvenile and underage levels, experiencing championship success in the under-16, minor and under-21 grades.

On 6 October 2013, O'Donoghue was at right wing-forward when Na Piarsaigh defeated Adare by 0–14 to 0–12 to win the Limerick Senior Championship. He was switched to midfield for the subsequent Munster Championship, which culminated with him winning a provincial medal after a 4–14 to 0–8 defeat of Sixmilebridge in the final.

O'Donoghue won a second Limerick Championship medal on 11 October 2015 after a 1–22 to 4–12 defeat of Patrickswell in the final. Later that season he won a second Munster medal after a 2–18 to 2–11 defeat of Ballygunner. On 17 March 2016, O'Donoghue won an All-Ireland medal when Na Piarsaigh defeated Ruairí Óg by 2–25 to 2–14 in the final.

On 15 October 2017, O'Donoghue won a third Limerick Championship medal when Na Piarsaigh defeated Kilmallock by 1–22 to 2–14 in the final. He later won a third Munster Championship medal when Na Piarsaigh defeated Ballygunner by 3–15 to 2–10 in the final. On 17 March 2018, O'Donoghue was at midfield when Na Piarsaigh were defeated by Cuala in the All-Ireland final.

On 27 October 2018, O'Donoghue won a fourth Limerick Championship medal as captain following Na Piarsaigh's 2–22 to 3–10 defeat of Doon.

O'Donoghue retained the captaincy for the 2019 championship, however, Na Piarsaigh surrendered their title following a 1–17 to 0–15 defeat by Patrickswell in the 2019 final.

On 19 September 2020, O'Donoghue captained Na Piarsaigh in a third consecutive final and their eighth overall in ten seasons. He ended the game with a fifth winners' medal after the 5–27 to 1–12 victory over Doon.

=== Inter-county ===
==== Under-21 ====
O'Donoghue joined the Limerick under-21 hurling team in 2014. He later joined the Limerick under-21 Gaelic football team.

==== Senior ====
On 19 February 2017, O'Donoghue made his first appearance for the Limerick senior hurling team in a 6–21 to 3–8 defeat of Kerry in the National Hurling League. In the subsequent league semi-final against Tipperary he scored his first goal in a 1–21 to 1–11 defeat by Tipperary.

On 19 August 2018, O'Donoghue was introduced as a 66th-minute substitute for Darragh O'Donovan when Limerick won their first All-Ireland SHC title in 45 years after a 3–16 to 2–18 defeat of Galway in the final.

In December 2018, O'Donoghue was included on the Limerick panel for the upcoming season. Injury ruled him out of the National League; however, he returned to training in March 2019. On 30 June 2019, O'Donoghue won a Munster SHC medal at midfield following Limerick's 2–26 to 2–14 defeat of Tipperary in the final. He ended the year by receiving his first All-Star nomination.

== Career statistics ==
As of match played 19 July 2026.

Team	Year	National League			Munster		All-Ireland		Total	
Team	Year	Division	Apps	Score	Apps	Score	Apps	Score	Apps	Score
Limerick	2017	Division 1B	5	1–3	0	0–0	0	0–0	5	1–3
Limerick	2018	Division 1B	0	0–0	2	0–0	4	0–0	6	0–0
Limerick	2019	Division 1A	0	0–0	5	0–1	1	0–0	6	0–1
Limerick	2020	Division 1A	4	0–2	3	0–2	2	0–1	9	0–5
Limerick	2021	Division 1A	5	0–2	2	0–1	2	0–1	9	0–4
	2022	Division 1A	4	0–0	5	0–1	2	0–1	11	0–2
	2023		3	0–2	5	0–1	2	0–0	10	0–3
	2024		4	0–0	5	0–2	1	0–0	10	0–2
	2025		3	1–0	5	0–0	1	0–0	9	1–0
	2026		6	0-0	5	0-0	2	0-0	13	0-0
Career total			34	2–9	37	0–8	17	0–3	88	2–21

== Honours ==
Na Piarsaigh

- All-Ireland Senior Club Hurling Championship: 2016
- Munster Senior Club Hurling Championship: 2013, 2015, 2017
- Limerick Senior Hurling Championship: 2013, 2015, 2017, 2018 (c), 2020 (c), 2022 (c), 2023 (c), 2025

Limerick

- All-Ireland Senior Hurling Championship: 2018, 2020, 2021, 2022, 2023, 2026
- Munster Senior Hurling Championship: 2019, 2020, 2021, 2022, 2023, 2024, 2026
- National Hurling League: 2019, 2020, 2023, 2026

Awards

- The Sunday Game Team of the Year (2): 2021, 2023
- GAA/GPA All-Star (3): 2021, 2023, 2026
