= David Dempsey =

David Dempsey may refer to:

- David Dempsey (cricketer) (born 1955), New Zealand cricketer
- David Dempsey (hurler) (born 1995), Irish hurler
- David Dempsey (writer) (1914–1999), American writer
