= Shane O'Neill (Limerick hurler) =

Irish hurling manager (born 1974)

Personal information
- Native name: Seán Ó Néill (Irish)
- Born: 1974 (age 51–52) Caherdavin, Limerick, Ireland
- Occupation: Solicitor

Sport
- Sport: Hurling
- Position: Full-forward
Club
- Years: Club
- 1990-2012: Na Piarsaigh
Club titles
- Limerick titles: 1
- Munster titles: 1
- All-Ireland Titles: 0
College
- Years: College
- University of Limerick
Inter-county
Years	County	Apps (scores)
1994-2000	Limerick	9 (1-05)
Inter-county titles
- Munster titles: 1
- All-Irelands: 0
- NHL: 1
- All Stars: 0

Shane O'Neill (born 1974) is an Irish hurling manager and former player who previously was the manager of the Galway senior hurling team. As a player he lined out with Limerick Senior Championship club Na Piarsaigh and the Limerick senior hurling team.

== Playing career ==
=== Na Piarsaigh ===
O'Neill joined the Na Piarsaigh club at a young age and played in all grades at juvenile and underage levels, enjoying much championship success in the minor and under-21 grades.

On 25 November 1990, O'Neill was just 16-years-old when he was a member of the extended panel of the Na Piarsaigh junior team that qualified to play Dromcollogher/Broadford in the Limerick Junior Championship final. He ended the game with a winners' medal following the 2-10 to 2-00 victory.

On 3 October 1993, O'Neill was at full-forward when Na Piarsaigh faced Blackrock in the Limerick Intermediate Championship final. He scored three points but ended on the losing side after a 2-04 to 0-08 defeat.

Na Piarsaigh qualified for a second successive Limerick Intermediate Championship final on 6 November 1994, with Tournafulla providing the opposition. O'Neill top scored with 1-02 from full-forward and ended the game with a winners' medal after the 2-14 to 0-04 victory.

On 18 October 2009, O'Neill was at full-forward when Na Piarsaigh qualified for their very first Limerick Senior Championship final. He was held scoreless from play in the 1-17 to 0-03 defeat by Adare.

Na Piarsaigh qualified for a second senior final on 2 October 2011. O'Neill lined out at left wing-forward and scored a point from play in the 2-13 to 0-13 defeat of Adare. On 4 December 2011, he won a Munster Championship medal following a 1-13 to 0-09 defeat of Crusheen in the final replay.

=== Limerick ===
==== Minor and under-21 ====
O'Neill was called up for a trial with the Limerick minor team prior to the start of the 1991 season, however, he failed to make the championship panel. Again eligible for the grade the following year, he was an unused substitute on 22 April 1992 when Limerick suffered a 1-07 to 0-09 defeat by Tipperary in the Munster Championship.

On 16 April 1993, O'Neill made his first appearance for the Limerick under-21 team. He scored 2-01 from play in the 5-09 to 4-08 defeat of Waterford in the Munster Championship. On 23 July 1993, O'Neill scored a goal when Limerick suffered a 1-18 to 3-09 defeat by Cork in the Munster final.

==== Senior ====
O'Neill was added to the Limerick senior team during the 1994-95 National League. He made a number of appearances throughout the campaign and was retained on the panel for the 1995 Munster Championship. O'Neill made his championship debut on 18 June 1995 when he came on as a 62nd-minute substitute for Pat Heffernan in a 0-16 to 0-15 defeat of Tipperary in the Munster semi-final. On 9 July 1995, he was an unused substitute when Limerick suffered a 1-17 to 0-11 defeat by Clare in the Munster final.

On 7 July 1996, O'Neill lined out at midfield when Limerick faced Tipperary in the Munster final. He was substituted at half-time in the 0-19 to 1-16 draw. O'Neill was dropped from the starting fifteen for the replay a week later but collected a Munster Championship medal as an unused substitute after a 4-07 to 0-16 victory. On 1 September 1996, he was again listed amongst the substitutes when Limerick faced Wexford in the All-Ireland final. He remained on the bench for the 1-13 to 0-14 defeat.

On 6 October 1997, O'Neill lined out at midfield when Limerick faced Galway in the National League final. He scored a point from play and collected a winners' medal after the 1-12 to 1-09 victory.

== Managerial career ==
=== Na Piarsaigh ===
In April 2014, it was confirmed that O'Neill had replaced Seán Stack as manager of the Na Piarsaigh senior team. His debut championship campaign saw Na Piarsaigh remain undefeated in the group stage and qualify for the final against Kilmallock on 19 October 2014 where his side suffered a 1-15 to 0-14 defeat.

O'Neill guided Na Piarsaigh to a second successive final on 11 October 2015. He claimed his first silverware as manager following the 1-22 to 4-12 defeat of Patrickswell. On 22 November 2015, Na Piarsaigh won the Munster Championship after a 2-18 to 2-11 defeat of Ballygunner in the final. On 17 March 2016, O'Neill managed Na Piarsaigh to the All-Ireland Championship medal when the club defeated Ruairí Óg by 2-25 to 2-14 in the All-Ireland final.

On 15 October 2017, O'Neill guided Na Piarsaigh to a third county final in four seasons. He claimed his second championship as manager following the 1-22 to 2-14 defeat of Kilmallock. On 19 November 2017, O'Neill won a second Munster Championship as Na Piarsaigh manager after a 3-15 to 2-10 defeat of Ballygunner in the final. On 17 March 2018, he guided Na Piarsaigh to a second All-Ireland final, however, his side suffered a 2-17 to 1-17 defeat by Cuala. It was later confirmed that O'Neill had stepped down as manager.

=== Galway ===
On 8 November 2019, O'Neill was ratified as manager of the Galway senior hurling team on a two-year term.

On 2 September 2021, after two years in charge, O'Neill announced that he would not be seeking an extension to his term as Galway manager and would leave the position.

== Career statistics ==
Team	Year	National League			Munster		All-Ireland		Total	
Team	Year	Division	Apps	Score	Apps	Score	Apps	Score	Apps	Score
Limerick	1994-95	Division 1	4	1-01	1	0-00	—		5	1-01
Limerick	1995-96	Division 2	1	0-00	3	0-00	0	0-00	4	0-00
Limerick	1997	Division 1	8	1-06	2	0-04	—		10	1-10
Limerick	1998	Division 1A	6	1-01	1	1-01	—		7	2-02
Limerick	1999	Division 1A	3	0-06	1	0-00	—		4	0-06
Limerick	2000	Division 1A	7	0-12	1	0-00	—		8	0-12
Total			29	3-26	9	1-05	0	0-00	39	4-31

== Honours ==
=== As a player ===
Na Piarsaigh

- Munster Senior Club Hurling Championship (1): 2011
- Limerick Senior Hurling Championship (1): 2011
- Limerick Intermediate Hurling Championship (1): 1994
- Limerick Junior Hurling Championship (1): 1990

Limerick

- Munster Senior Hurling Championship (1): 1996
- National Hurling League (1): 1997

=== As a manager ===
Na Piarsaigh

- All-Ireland Senior Club Hurling Championship (1): 2016
- Munster Senior Club Hurling Championship (2): 2015, 2017
- Limerick Senior Hurling Championship (2): 2015, 2017

Galway

- National Hurling League (1): 2021

Sporting positions
Preceded by Micheál Donoghue	Galway Senior Hurling Team Manager; 2019-2021	Succeeded by Henry Shefflin
