= 2016 All-Ireland Senior Club Hurling Championship final =

2016 All-Ireland Senior Club Hurling Championship Final
- Event: 2015–16 All-Ireland Senior Club Hurling Championship
Ruairí Óg, Cushendall	Na Piarsaigh
2-14	2-25
- Date: 17 March 2016
- Venue: Croke Park, Dublin
- Man of the Match: Adrian Breen
- Referee: Diarmuid Kirwan (Cork)
- Attendance: 31,603
- Weather: Dry

The 2016 All-Ireland Senior Club Hurling Championship final was a hurling match which was played at Croke Park on 17 March 2016 to determine the winners of the 2015–16 All-Ireland Senior Club Hurling Championship, the 46th season of the All-Ireland Senior Club Hurling Championship, a tournament organised by the Gaelic Athletic Association for the champion clubs of the four provinces of Ireland. The final was contested by Ruairí Óg, Cushendall of Antrim and Na Piarsaigh of Limerick, with Na Piarsaigh winning by 2-25 to 2-14.

The All-Ireland final between Na Piarsaigh and Ruairí Óg, Cushendall was a unique occasion as it was the first ever championship meeting between the two teams. Both teams were appearing in their first All-Ireland final.

The game developed into a one-sided affair. Adrian Breen, who was a late addition to the Na Piarsaigh team, stroked home an early goal as well as a point soon after. Kevin Downes contributed a 24th-minute goal when he cut inside and fired a low shot to the left corner. Na Piarsaigh had effectively settled the game as early as the 26th minute when they led by 13 points after outscoring the Ulster champions by 1-09 to 0-01 in a blitzkrieg period. Ruairí Óg, Cushendall responded with three points in a row including a second of the day from Shane McNaughton who hit four excellent points in total, however, Na Piarsaigh held a solid 2-12 to 0-06 half-time lead.

After the interval goal-scorer Breen was on the mark again along with Shane Dowling and Peter Casey. There was a brief reprieve for Cushendall when Neil McManus flicked in a 39th-minute goal from a long Shane McNaughton free. McManus continued to pick off points from frees and finished with that impressive 1-07 tally but the scores simply came easier for Na Piarsaigh who continued to split the posts at their ease and took Karl McKeegan's goal in their stride.

Na Piarsaigh's All-Ireland victory was their first ever and a first for a Limerick club. They became the 25th club to win the All-Ireland title.

== Match ==
17 March 2016

Ruairí Óg, Cushendall	2-14 - 2-25	Na Piarsaigh
N. McManus (1-7, 0-7 frees); S. McNaughton (0-4); K. McKeegan (1-0); E. Campbell, A. Delargy, C. Carson (0-1 each).	Report	S. Dowling (0-7, 0-5 frees), A. Breen (1-4); K. Downes (1-2); A. Dempsey (0-4); P. Casey (0-3); D. Breen (0-2); R. Lynch, W. O’Donoghue, P. Gleeson (65) (0-1 each).

Croke Park, Dublin
Attendance: 31,603
Referee: D Kirwan (Cork)

Ruairí Óg, Cushendall	Na Piarsaigh
