= David Dempsey (cricketer) =

New Zealand cricketer

Personal information
- Full name: David Angus Dempsey
- Born: 27 May 1955 (age 71); Christchurch, New Zealand
- Batting: Right-handed
- Bowling: Right-arm medium

Domestic team information
- Years: Team
- 1979/80–1987/88: Canterbury

Career statistics
Competition	First-class	List A
Matches	32	25
Runs scored	1,517	642
Batting average	25.28	26.75
100s/50s	4/1	1/5
Top score	131	104
Balls bowled	537	416
Wickets	5	11
Bowling average	57.20	24.36
5 wickets in innings	0	0
10 wickets in match	0	0
Best bowling	3/67	3/37
Catches/stumpings	18/–	11/–
- Source: Cricinfo, 17 April 2024

David Angus Dempsey (born 27 May 1955) is a former New Zealand cricketer. He played in 32 first-class and 25 List A matches for Canterbury from 1979 to 1988.

Dempsey was born in Christchurch and attended Christchurch Boys' High School. He was a hard-hitting right-handed opening batsman and occasional medium-pace bowler. In a senior club match in Christchurch in December 1977, he scored 174 in 112 minutes.

Dempsey was the highest scorer in the national one-day Shell Cup competition in 1980–81, with 252 runs at an average of 42.00; he also made the competition's highest score, 104 off 89 balls, against Northern Districts, winning the man of the match award.

1980–81 was also Dempsey's most successful season in first-class cricket, with 503 runs at an average of 35.92; he also made his own highest score, against Otago in the Shell Trophy, when he and Barry Hadlee opened the match with a partnership of 218 before Dempsey was out for 131. In the match against Wellington, when Canterbury needed 273 to win in 220 minutes, he scored a century off 89 balls, finished with 121, and Canterbury won with time to spare.

Dempsey lost form in 1981–82, and after being dropped from the Canterbury team he publicly expressed his displeasure with the selectors. He was not included in the initial Canterbury squad for the 1982–83 season. After some years of little first-class cricket, he was selected to captain Canterbury for the 1987–88 season. His form during the season was moderate, but in the last match he finished his first-class career with 121 from 187 balls against Otago.
