= Micheál Houlihan =

Irish hurler (born 1997)

Personal information
- Native name: Mícheál Ó hUallacháin (Irish)
- Born: 1997 (age 28–29) Kilmallock, County Limerick, Ireland
- Occupation: Insurance agent

Sport
- Sport: Hurling
- Position: Left wing-forward
Club
- Years: Club
- 2015-present: Kilmallock
Club titles
- Limerick titles: 2
College
- Years: College
- 2015-2019: University of Limerick
Inter-county*
Years	County	Apps (scores)
2022-present	Limerick	0 (0-00)
Inter-county titles
- Munster titles: 3
- All-Irelands: 2
- NHL: 2
- All Stars: 0
- *Inter County team apps and scores correct as of 16:25, 12 February 2022.

Micheál Houlihan (born 1997) is an Irish hurler. At club level he plays with Kilmallock, while he is also a member of the Limerick senior hurling team. He usually lines out as a forward.

== Career ==
Houlihan first played hurling at juvenile and underage levels with the Kilmallock club. He had already joined the club's senior team when he captained the under-21 side to a county title in 2018. Houlihan was the championship's top scorer when Kilmallock beat Patrickswell to win the Limerick SHC title in 2021.

After being overlooked at minor level, Houlihan first played for the Limerick at under-21 level in 2018. He was drafted onto the senior team in 2022 and was part of the extended panel when Limerick won that year's All-Ireland title. Houlihan made his debut during the 2023 National League.

== Career statistics ==
As of 22 March 2025.

Team	Year	National League			Munster		All-Ireland		Total	
Team	Year	Division	Apps	Score	Apps	Score	Apps	Score	Apps	Score
Limerick	2022	Division 1A	0	0-00	0	0-00	0	0-00	0	0-00
Limerick	2023	Division 1A	4	0-18	0	0-00	0	0-00	4	0-18
	2024		3	0-08	0	0-00	0	0-00	3	0-08
	2025		3	0-00	0	0-00	0	0-00	3	0-00
Career total			10	0-28	0	0-00	0	0-00	10	0-28

== Honours ==
Kilmallock

- Limerick Senior Hurling Championship: 2021
- Limerick Under-21 Hurling Championship: 2018 (c)

Limerick

- All-Ireland Senior Hurling Championship: 2022
- Munster Senior Hurling Championship: 2022
