= 2020 Limerick Senior Hurling Championship =

Annual hurling competition season

- Dates: 23 July 2020 – 19 September 2020
- Teams: 12
- Sponsor: Bon Secours Hospital
- Champions: Na Piarsaigh (6th title); William O'Donoghue (captain); Kieran Bermingham (manager)
- Runners-up: Doon; Tony Ward (manager)
- Relegated: Murroe-Boher

Tournament statistics
- Matches played: 20
- Goals scored: 57 (2.85 per match)
- Points scored: 712 (35.6 per match)
- Top scorer(s): Andrew Cliffe (3–31)

The 2020 Limerick Senior Hurling Championship was the 126th staging of the Limerick Senior Hurling Championship since its establishment by the Limerick County Board in 1887. The original championship draw took place on 16 December 2019, however, due to the COVID-19 pandemic the draws for a rescheduled championship took place on 24 June 2020 with a new format being adopted. The championship began on 23 July 2020 and ended on 19 September 2020.

Patrickswell were the defending champions, however, they were beaten by Na Piarsaigh at the semi-final stage. Murroe-Boher were relegated after suffering a 0–24 to 1–17 defeat by Garryspillane in a playoff.

On 19 September 2020, Na Piarsaigh won the championship after a 5–27 to 1–12 victory over Doon in the final at the LIT Gaelic Grounds. It was their sixth championship title overall and their first title since 2018.

Ballybrown's Andrew Cliffe was the championship's top scorer with 3–31.

== Revised format ==
The championship was redrawn to consist of four groups of three teams. The six teams that were drawn in the original format in each section group 1 and 2 were split into two further groups. The redrawn groups were decided based on 2019 championship results.

Section A

- The top team in each group in Section A to qualify for the championship semi-finals.
- The second team in each group in Section A qualify for the championship quarter-finals.
- The bottom team in each group to play in the relegation final for Group 2 in the 2021 championship.

Section B

- The top team in each group in Section B qualify for the championship quarter-finals (draw will be seeded).
- The bottom team in each group in Section B to play in the relegation final for the Premier Intermediate Championship in 2021.
- The top team in each group in Section B to qualify for the promotion final to Section A for the 2021 season.
- If a team from Section B wins the championship they will automatically be promoted to Section A for the 2021 season and no promotion final will be necessary.

== Team changes ==
=== To Championship ===
Promoted from the Limerick Premier Intermediate Hurling Championship

- Blackrock

=== From Championship ===
Relegated to the Limerick Premier Intermediate Hurling Championship

- Knockainey

== Fixtures/results ==
=== Section A ===
==== Group 1 table ====
Advance to semi-finals Advance to quarter-finals Advance to sectional relegation final

Team	Matches				Score			Pts
Team	Pld	W	D	L	For	Against	Diff	Pts
Patrickswell	2	1	1	0	5–38	0–47	6	3
Doon	2	0	2	0	0–43	3–34	0	2
Adare	2	0	1	1	1–45	3–45	−6	1

==== Group 1 results ====
23 July 2020 Round 1	Patrickswell	3–23 – 0–26	Adare	LIT Gaelic Grounds
	A Gillane 2–6, K O'Brien 1–2, P Kirby 0–4, J Kelleher 0–3, J Gillane 0–2, J Flynn 0–2, C Lynch 0–1, D Byrnes 0–1, T O'Brien 0–1, M Carmody 0–1.	Report	W Griffin 0–14, D Hannon 0–4, B O'Connor 0–2, J Sweeney 0–1, C McCarthy 0–1, M Connolly 0–1, J Fitzgibbon 0–1, R Connolly 0–1, F Costello 0–1.

31 July 2020 Round 2	Adare	1–19 – 0–22	Doon	LIT Gaelic Grounds
	W Griffin 0–8, B O'Connor 1–2, J Fitzgibbon 0–5, J Sweeney 0–2, S Connolly 0–1, J McSweeney 0–1.		B Murphy 0–7, J Ryan 0–4, D o'Donovan 0–3, P Ryan 0–3, D Moloney 0–2, J Ryan 0–1, M Ryan 0–1, J Cummins 0–1.

8 August 2020 Round 3	Doon	0–21 – 2–15	Patrickswell	LIT Gaelic Grounds
	B Murphy 0–5, P Ryan 0–3, D Moloney 0–3, D Stapleton 0–3, D Coleman 0–3, D O'Donovan 0–1, M O'Brien 0–1, M Ryan 0–1, J Ryan 0–1.		A Gillane 1–3, J Gillane 0–5, P Kirby 1–0, J Flynn 0–2, K O'Brien 0–2, D Byrne 0–1, M Carmody 0–1, T O'Brien 0–1.

==== Group 2 table ====
Advance to semi-finals Advance to quarter-finals Advance to sectional relegation final

Team	Matches				Score			Pts
Team	Pld	W	D	L	For	Against	Diff	Pts
Kilmallock	2	2	0	0	4–38	4–30	8	4
Na Piarsaigh	2	1	0	1	3–40	2–25	+18	2
Ahane	2	0	0	2	3–22	4–45	−26	0

==== Group 2 results ====
24 July 2020 Round 1	Na Piarsaigh	1–17 – 2–16	Kilmallock	LIT Gaelic Grounds
	P Casey (0–6, 2f), A Breen 1–2, W Henn (0–5 3f), R Lynch (0–3, 2f, ‘65), T Grimes (0–1).	Report	G Mulcahy (1–4), M Houlihan (0–6, 5f), K O’Donnell (0–3), O O’Reilly (1–0), P O’Brien, G O’Mahony (s), Paddy O’Loughlin (0–1) each.	Referee: J O'Halloran

1 August 2020 Round 2	Ahane	0–09 – 2–23	Na Piarsaigh	LIT Gaelic Grounds
	T Morrissey (0–6 5 f), N Moran, C Barry, D Morrissey (0–1) each		W Henn (1–8, 5f), A Breen 1–4, R Lynch (0–4, 3f, '65), D Dempsey 0–3, K Downes, P Casey (0–2) each.

8 August 2020 Round 3	Ahane	3–13 – 2–22	Kilmallock	LIT Gaelic Grounds
	T Morrissey 1–7, P O'Halloran 2–0, N Moran 0–2, D Morrissey 0–1, W Brennan 0–1, R Fox 0–1, C O'Mara 0–1.		M Houlihan 0–10, G Mulcahy 1–4, D Woulfe 0–5, O O'Reilly 1–0, G O'Mahoney 0–2, P O'Brien 0–1.

==== Relegation final ====
13 September 2020 Final	Adare	2–17 – 0–28	Ahane	Childers Road
	J Fitzgibbon 2–6, W Griffin 0–6, D Hannon 0–2, C McCarthy 0–1, D O'Mahony 0–1, M Connolly 0–1.		T Morrissey 0–16, N Moran 0–7, W Brennan 0–4, M O'Halloran 0–1.

=== Section B ===
==== Group 1 table ====
Advance to sectional promotion final and championship quarter-finals Advance to championship relegation final

Team	Matches				Score			Pts
Team	Pld	W	D	L	For	Against	Diff	Pts
South Liberties	2	1	0	1	3–33	2–30	6	2
Monaleen	2	1	0	1	2–30	0–33	3	2
Murroe-Boher	2	1	0	1	1–36	4–36	−9	0

==== Group 1 results ====
25 July 2020 Round 1	Monaleen	1–15 – 0–12	South Liberties	Fr. Hayes Memorial Park
	M O'Dwyer 1–4, A La Touche Cosgrave 0–6, G Collins 0–2, E Doyle 0–2, J Nicholas 0–1.		B Ryan 0–7, T Ryan 0–2, B Garry 0–1, B Nash 0–1, D O'Neill 0–1.

1 August 2020 Round 2	Murroe-Boher	1–15 – 3–21	South Liberties	Fr. Hayes Memorial Park
	S Tobin 0–10, D Hickey 1–0, M Ryan 0–1, M Hanley 0–1, A Kennedy 0–1, J Casey 0–1, E Hourigan 0–1.		B Nash 3–5, B Ryan 0–6, T Ryan 0–4, D O'Neill 0–3, J Fitzpatrick 0–1, B Garry 0–1, C McSweeney 0–1.

9 August 2020 Round 3	Monaleen	1–15 – 0–21	Murroe-Boher	LIT Gaelic Grounds
	M O'Dwyer 0–9, D Ó Dálaigh 1–0, E Doyle 0–2, L Lyons 0–2, J Nicholas 0–1, D Moloney 0–1.		S Tobin 0–15, J Casey 0–3, M Dee 0–1, E Horigan 0–1, D Sheehan 0–1.

==== Group 2 table ====
Advance to sectional promotion final and championship quarter-finals Advance to championship relegation final

Team	Matches				Score			Pts
Team	Pld	W	D	L	For	Against	Diff	Pts
Ballybrown	2	2	0	0	9–43	3–25	36	4
Blackrock	2	0	1	1	2–31	5–32	−10	1
Garryspillane	2	0	1	1	2–25	5–42	−26	1

==== Group 2 results ====
25 July 2020 Round 1	Blackrock	2–14 – 4–18	Ballybrown	Bruff Sportsfield
	K Palmer 2–2; P Leahy 0–7 (0-5f, 1 ’65); G O’Loughlin 0–2; R McCarthy, C O’Keeffe, I O’Brien 0–1 each.	Report	A Cliffe 2–11 (1–0 pen, 5fs, 1 ’65); S Kenny, S O’Reilly 1–0 each; C Coughlan 0–3; K Power 0–2; A O’Connor, B Griffin 0–1 each.	Referee: M Sexton (Bruree)

1 August 2020 Round 2	Blackrock	0–17 – 1–14	Garryspillane	FitzGerald Park, Kilmallock
	P Leahy 0–7, K Palmer 0–2, C O'Keeffe 0–2, M Farrell 0–2, D Dawson 0–1, D Heffernan 0–1, I O'Brien 0–1, D Moloney 0–1.		D O'Shea 0–8, E Sheehan 1–3, J Kerins 0–2, C Ryan 0–1.

7 August 2020 Round 3	Ballybrown	5–25 – 1–11	Garryspillane	LIT Gaelic Grounds
	A Cliffe 1–7, J Adams 2–0, A O'Connor 1–2, S Kenny 1–1, K Gavin 0–4, S O'Reilly 0–4, B Griffin 0–3, C Coughlan 0–2, R Griffin 0–1, R Kenny 0–1.		D Ryan 1–6, B Heavey 0–4, J Kerins 0–1.

==== Promotion final ====
13 September 2020 Final	South Liberties	2–09 – 2–14	Ballybrown	Mick Neville Park
	D O'Neill 1–4, S Brosnahan 1–1, B Nash 0–3, B Garry 0–1.		J Adams 2–0, A Cliffe 0–6, K Gavin 0–3, S O'Reilly 0–2, L Doolan 0–1, B Griffin 0–1, S Kenny 0–1.

=== Knock-out stage ===
==== Relegation final ====
13 September 2020 Final	Murroe-Boher	1–17 – 0–24 (aet)	Garryspillane	Bruff Sportsfield

==== Quarter-finals ====
5 September 2020 Quarter-final	Na Piarsaigh	0–26 – 0–13	Ballybrown	LIT Gaelic Grounds
	P Casey (0–7, 1f), R Lynch (0–5, 3f, 2 ‘65), C Boylan (0–4), K Downes and W Henn (1f)( 0–3 each), D Dempsey, W O’Donoghue, A McNamara and A Breen (0–1 each).	Report	A Cliffe (0–7, 7f), A O’Connor and J Adams (1f) (0–2 each), K Power and L Doolan (0–1 each).

6 September 2020 Quarter-final	Doon	3–20 – 2–12	South Liberties	LIT Gaelic Grounds
	B Murphy (0–6, 5f, ‘65), P Ryan (1–2), Josh Ryan (0–4), Jack Ryan (0–3), D Stapleton and M Ryan (1–0 each), E Stokes (0–2), D Moloney, C Ryan and J Cummins (0-1each).	Report	B Ryan (1–5, 5f), T Ryan (0–5), D O’Neill (1–0), B Garry (0–2), B Nash (0–1).

==== Semi-finals ====
12 September 2020 Semi-final	Patrickswell	0–17 – 1–25	Na Piarsaigh	LIT Gaelic Grounds
	A Gillane (7 frees)(0–9); C Lynch, D Byrnes (2 frees)(0–3); K O’Brien, J Flynn (0–1 each).	Report	W Henn (6 frees)(0–9); D Dempsey (1–1); R Lynch (free, 2 65s) (0–3); W O’Donoghue, K Downes, T Grimes, P Casey (0–2 each); A Breen, J Boylan, C Boylan, A McNamara (0–1 each).

12 September 2020 Semi-final	Kilmallock	1–17 – 2–20	Doon	LIT Gaelic Grounds
	M Houlihan (65, 2 frees) (0–4); G Mulcahy (1–3); O O’Reilly, P O’Brien, K O’Donnell (0–2 each), G O’Mahony (free), D Woulfe, C O’Connor, R Hanley (0–1 each).	Report	B Murphy (7 frees, 1 65) (0–8); P Ryan (0–7); Jack Ryan (2–0); Josh Ryan (0–3); D Stapleton, D Coleman (0–1 each).

==== Final ====
20 September 2020 Final	Na Piarsaigh	5–27 – 1–12	Doon	LIT Gaelic Grounds
	P Casey (2–4); D Dempsey (2–2); W Henn (0–8, 7 frees); R Lynch (0–4, 3 frees, 1 65), A Breen (0–3), C Boylan, T Grimes, J O'Brien (frees) (0–2 each).	Report	B Murphy (1–4, 3 frees, 1 65, 1 pen), C Ryan (0–3, frees), J Ryan, D Moloney (0–2 each); J Cummins (0–1).	Attendance: 200; Referee: J Murphy

== Championship statistics ==
=== Top scorers ===
Overall

Rank	Player	Club	Tally	Total	Matches	Average
1	Andrew Cliffe	Ballybrown	3–31	40	4	10.00
2	Will Henn	Na Piarsaigh	1–33	36	5	7.20
3	Barry Murphy	Doon	1–30	33	5	6.60
4	Tom Morrissey	Ahane	1–29	32	3	10.66
5	Willie Griffin	Adare	0–28	28	3	9.33
6	Aaron Gillane	Patrickswell	3–18	27	3	9.00
6	Peter Casey	Na Piarsaigh	2–21	27	5	5.40
7	Seán Tobin	Murroe-Boher	0–25	25	2	12.50
8	Dylan O'Shea	Garryspillane	0–24	24	3	8.00
9	Brian Ryan	South Liberties	1–18	21	3	6.00

In a single game

Rank	Player	Club	Tally	Total	Opposition
1	Andrew Cliffe	Ballybrown	2–11	17	Blackrock
2	Tom Morrissey	Ahane	0–16	16	Adare
3	Seán Tobin	Murroe-Boher	0–15	15	Monaleen
4	Barry Nash	South Liberties	3–05	14	Murroe-Boher
4	Willie Griffin	Adare	0–14	14	Patrickswell
4	Dylan O'Shea	Garryspillane	0–14	14	Murroe-Boher
5	Aaron Gillane	Patrickswell	2–06	12	Adare
5	John Fitzgibbon	Adare	2–06	12	Ahane
6	Will Henn	Na Piarsaigh	1–08	11	Ahane
7	Peter Casey	Na Piarsaigh	2–04	10	Doon
7	Tom Morrissey	Ahane	1–07	10	Kilmallock
7	Andrew Cliffe	Ballybrown	1–07	10	Garryspillane
7	Micheál Houlihan	Kilmallock	0–10	10	Ahane
7	Seán Tobin	Murroe-Boher	0–10	10	South Liberties
