= John Fitzgibbon (Limerick hurler) =

Irish hurler

Personal information
- Native name: Seán Mac Giobúin (Irish)
- Born: 21 September 1992 (age 34) Adare, County Limerick, Ireland
- Occupation: Bank official
- Height: 5 ft 11 in (180 cm)

Sport
- Sport: Hurling
- Position: Midfield
Club
- Years: Club
- 2009-present: Adare
Club titles
- Limerick titles: 1
Inter-county*
Years	County	Apps (scores)
2015-2017	Limerick	2 (0-1)
Inter-county titles
- Munster titles: 0
- All-Irelands: 0
- NHL: 0
- All Stars: 0
- *Inter County team apps and scores correct as of 20:03, 12 March 2016.

John Fitzgibbon (born 21 September 1992) is an Irish hurler who plays as a midfielder for the Limerick senior team.

Born in Adare, County Limerick, Fitzgibbon was introduced to hurling in his youth. He enjoyed Harty Cup success at colleges level with Ardscoil Rís while simultaneously enjoying championship successes at underage levels with the Adare club. Fitzgibbon has won one championship medal.

Fitzgibbon made his debut on the inter-county scene at the age of sixteen when he first linked up with the Limerick minor team. He later lined out with the under-21 team. Fitzgibbon made his senior debut during the 2015 Waterford Crystal Cup. He has since gone on to become a regular member of the Limerick senior team.

== Honours ==
=== Player ===
Ardscoil Rís

- Harty Cup (2): 2010, 2011

Adare

- Limerick Senior Hurling Championship (1): 2009

Limerick

- Waterford Crystal Cup (1): 2015
