= 2018 Limerick Senior Hurling Championship =

Annual hurling competition season

- Dates: 20 April 2018 – 27 October 2018
- Teams: 12
- Sponsor: Credit Union
- Champions: Na Piarsaigh (5th title); William O'Donoghue (captain); Paul Beary (manager)
- Runners-up: Doon; Richie English (captain); Tom Murphy (manager)
- Relegated: Cappamore

Tournament statistics
- Matches played: 35
- Goals scored: 83 (2.37 per match)
- Points scored: 1096 (31.31 per match)
- Top scorer(s): Shane Dowling (1–65)

The 2018 Limerick Senior Hurling Championship was the 124th staging of the Limerick Senior Hurling Championship since its establishment by the Limerick County Board in 1887. The group stage placings were confirmed on 21 November 2017. The championship began on 20 April 2018 and ended on 27 October 2018.

Na Piarsaigh were the defending champions.

On 27 October 2018, Na Piarsaigh won the title following a 2–22 to 3–10 defeat of Doon in the final at the Gaelic Grounds. It was their fifth championship title overall and their second title in succession.

Na Piarsaigh's Shane Dowling was the championship's top scorer with 1–65.

== Team changes ==
=== To Championship ===
Promoted from the Limerick Premier Intermediate Hurling Championship

- Murroe/Boher

=== From Championship ===
Relegated to the Limerick Premier Intermediate Hurling Championship

- Bruff

== Results ==
=== Group 1 ===
==== Table ====
Advanced to semi-finals Advanced to quarter-finals Relegated

Team	Matches				Score			Pts
Team	Pld	W	D	L	For	Against	Diff	Pts
Na Piarsaigh	5	4	1	0	124	80	+44	9
Doon	5	3	1	1	90	82	+12	7
Kilmallock	5	3	1	1	106	81	+25	7
Patrickswell	5	2	0	3	105	109	−4	4
Adare	5	0	2	3	90	123	−33	2
Ballybrown	5	0	1	4	78	118	−40	1

==== Results ====
21 April 2018 Round 1	Ballybrown	0–14 – 1–24	Kilmallock	Gaelic Grounds, Limerick
	A O'Connor 0–12, R Kenny 0–1, M Sheehan 0–1.		M Houlihan 0–6, G Mulcahy 0–5, O O'Reilly 1–1, J Mulcahy 0–3, P O'Loughlin 0–2, G O'Mahony 0–2, P O'Brien 0–1, K O'Donnell 0–1, P O'Loughlin 0–1, P O'Reilly 0–1, S Quirke 0–1.	Referee: D O'Callaghan (Feohanagh-Castlemahon)

21 April 2018 Round 1	Adare	3–10 – 3–24	Patrickswell	Gaelic Grounds, Limerick
	W Griffin 1–5, D Hannon 2–0, C McCarthy 0–2, J Fitzgibbon 0–2, L O'Brien 0–1.		S O'Brien 2–1, A Gillane 1–4, P Harty 0–5, C Lynch 0–3, T O'Brien 0–3, K O'Brien 0–3, J Considine 0–2, J Kelleher 0–2, D Ahern 0–1.	Referee: J O'Halloran (Adare)

22 April 2018 Round 1	Doon	1–16 – 4–15	Na Piarsaigh	Gaelic Grounds, Limerick
	B Murphy 0–10, D O'Donovan 1–1, D Coleman 0–2, D Moloney 0–1, P Ryan 0–1, M Ryan 0–1.		S Dowling 1–8, R Lynch 1–2, C Boylan 1–0, A Breen 1–0, A Dempsey 0–2, D Dempsey 0–2, K Downes 0–1.	Referee: J Murphy (Glenroe)

28 April 2018 Round 2	Na Piarsaigh	2–21 – 1–08	Ballybrown	Bruff Sportsfield, Bruff
	S Dowling 0–12, A Breen 1–2, A Dempsey 0–5, D Sheppard 1–0, K Downes 0–1, C King 0–1.		J Adams 1–0, A O'Connor 0–3, B Griffin 0–1, J Hall 0–1, R Griffin 0–1, R Kenny 0–1, S O'Reilly 0–1.

29 April 2018 Round 2	Patrickswell	1–17 – 1–20	Doon	FitzGerald Park, Kilmallock
	A Gillane 0–8, J Considine 1–2, C Lynch 0–2, D Byrnes 0–2, K O'Brien 0–1, J Kelleher 0–1, S O'Brien 0–1.		B Murphy 0–10, D Coleman 1–4, P Ryan 0–2, D O'Donovan 0–2, M Ryan 0–1, J Ryan 0–1.

29 April 2018 Round 2	Kilmallock	2–17 – 0–14	Adare	Gaelic Park, Newcastle West
	M Houlihan 0–7, G O'Mahony 1–2, G Mulcahy 0–5, O O'Reilly 1–0, P O'Brien 0–1, P O'Loughlin 0–1, P O'Reilly 0–1.		J Fitzgibbon 0–4, W Griffin 0–4, D Hannon 0–3, M Mackey 0–1, J English 0–1, J Hannon 0–1.

31 August 2018 Round 3	Patrickswell	1–20 – 2–12	Ballybrown	Childers Road, Limerick
	A Gillane 0–8, P Harty 1–0, C Lynch 0–3, L Considine 0–2, K O'Brien 0–2, J Kelleher 0–1, C Carroll 0–1, J Considine 0–1, D Byrnes 0–1, T O'Brien 0–1.		A Cliffe 0–9, B Griffin 1–1, A O'Connor 1–0, K Gavin 0–1, J Garvey 0–1.

1 September 2018 Round 3	Doon	1–13 – 1–13	Adare	Bruff Sportsfield, Bruff
	B Murphy 0–7, D Stapleton 1–0, C McNamara 0–2, J Ryan 0–1, M Barry 0–1, D Coleman 0–1, M Ryan 0–1.		W Griffin 0–9, B O'Connor 1–0, J Fitzgibbon 0–3, S O'Connor 0–1.

1 September 2018 Round 3	Na Piarsaigh	0–21 – 2–15	Kilmallock	Gaelic Grounds, Limerick
	S Dowling 0–10, A Breen 0–3, C Boylan 0–2, R Lynch 0–2, T Grimes 0–2, T Dempsey 0–1, K Downes 0–1.		O O'Reilly 1–2, R Egan 1–2, M Houlihan 0–5, R Hanley 0–2, G Mulcahy 0–2, K Hayes 0–1, P O'Brien 0–1.

8 September 2018 Round 4	Kilmallock	1–22 – 1–12	Patrickswell	Gaelic Grounds, Limerick
	G Mulcahy 0–9, J Mulcahy 0–5, O O'Reilly 1–0, P O'Brien 0–3, G O'Mahony 0–2, M Houlihan 0–1, R Hanley 0–1, R Egan 0–1.		A Gillane 1–3, C Lynch 0–3, D Byrnes 0–2, J Considine 0–2, J Kelleher 0–1, T O'Brien 0–1.

8 September 2018 Round 4	Adare	0–15 – 2–19	Na Piarsaigh	Gaelic Grounds, Limerick
	W Griffin 0–11, J Fitzgibbon 0–3, R Connolly 0–1.		A Breen 1–5, S Dowling 0–7, P Casey 1–1, K Downes 0–3, T Grimes 0–1, D Dempsey 0–1, A Dempsey 0–1.

9 September 2018 Round 4	Ballybrown	0–09 – 1–12	Doon	Bruff Sportsfield, Bruff
	A Cliffe 0–3, D Hall 0–2, K Power 0–2, K Gavin 0–1, R Griffin 0–1.		P Ryan 1–2, B Murphy 0–4, J Ryan 0–3, D Coleman 0–2, D Stapleton 0–1.

23 September 2018 Round 5	Adare	3–17 – 3–17	Ballybrown	Childers Road, Limerick
	W Griffin 0–12, C McCarthy 1–2, J Fitzgibbon 1–1, S O'Connor 1–0, M Mackey 0–1, R Connolly 0–1.		A Cliffe 0–7, B Griffin 1–2, K Gavin 0–5, M Kiely 1–1, R Grififn 1–0, K Power 0–1, L Doolan 0–1.

23 September 2018 Round 5	Patrickswell	1–11 – 1–21	Na Piarsaigh	Gaelic Grounds, Limerick
	A Gillane 1–3, C Lynch 0–2, P Harty 0–2, L Conisidine 0–2, T O'Brien 0–1, D Byrnes 0–1.		S Dowling 0–9, P Casey 1–3, K Downes 0–3, D Dempsey 0–3, A Dempsey 0–2, G Brown 0–1.

23 September 2018 Round 5	Doon	0–17 – 0–10	Kilmallock	Gaelic Grounds, Limerick
	B Murphy 0–9, D Coleman 0–4, P Ryan 0–2, J Ryan 0–2.		R Egan 0–2, G Mulcahy 0–2, J Mulcahy 0–2, P O'Brien 0–2, P O'Reilly 0–1, O O'Reilly 0–1.

=== Group 2 ===
==== Table ====
Promoted and advanced to quarter-finals Advanced to quarter-finals Relegated

Team	Matches				Score			Pts
Team	Pld	W	D	L	For	Against	Diff	Pts
South Liberties	5	4	0	1	90	79	+11	8
Murroe-Boher	5	4	0	1	94	75	+19	8
Monaleen	5	3	1	1	91	81	+10	7
Ahane	5	2	0	3	76	72	+4	4
Knockainey	5	1	0	4	81	107	−26	2
Cappamore	5	0	1	4	74	92	−18	1

==== Results ====
20 April 2018 Round 1	Monaleen	0–20 – 0–16	Knockainey	Fr. Hayes Memorial Park, Caherconlish
	M O'Dwyer 0–8, E Doyle 0–3, L Murphy 0–2, A La Touche-Cosgrave 0–2, J Nicholas 0–1, J Porter 0–1, D Power 0–1, S Griffin 0–1, P Russell 0–1.		K Cleary 0–8, D Walsh 0–3, P Barron 0–2, K Moloney 0–1, D Madden 0–1, J Lonergan 0–1.

21 April 2018 Round 1	Ahane	0–14 – 0–11	Cappamore	Fr. Hayes Memorial Park, Caherconlish
	T Morrissey 0–9, N Moran 0–2, C Carroll 0–1, J Fox 0–1, D Morrissey 0–1.		T O'Donoghue 0–5, C Berkery 0–2, A Coleman 0–2, D Shanahan 0–1, D Lonergan 0–1.

22 April 2018 Round 1	South Liberties	1–13 – 1–12	Murroe-Boher	Portnard Sportsfield, Cappamore
	B Ryan 0–9, B Nash 1–0, D O'Neill 0–2, M Keane 0–1, S O'Neill 0–1.		S Tobin 0–6, M Ryan 1–2, D Sheehan 0–2, D Dunlea 0–1, D Kennedy 0–1.

28 April 2018 Round 2	Cappamore	1–13 – 1–13	Monaleen	FitzGerald Park, Kilmallock
	T O'Donoghue 0–8, B Creamer 1–3, A Coleman 0–1, P Doyle 0–1.		P Russell 0–5, J Nicholas 1–1, A La Touche-Cosgrave 0–2, C Nicholas 0–2, S Griffin 0–1, L Lyons 0–1, E Doyle 0–1.

29 April 2018 Round 2	Murroe-Boher	0–13 – 0–12	Ahane	Portnard Sportsfield, Cappamore
	S Tobinb 0–10, A Kennedy 0–1, D Sheehan 0–1, M Ryan 0–1.		T Morrissey 0–9, W Shanahan 0–2, J Fox 0–1.

29 April 2018 Round 2	Knockainey	2–09 – 3–18	South Liberties	Bruff Sportsfield, Bruff
	P Barron 2–2, K Cleary 0–6, D Madden 0–1.		W Hickey 3–2, B Ryan 0–8, B Bash 0–3, D O'Neill 0–2, S O'Neill 0–2, R O'Neill 0–1.

31 August 2018 Round 3	Knockainey	1–09 – 0–18	Ahane	Portnard Sportsfield, Cappamore
	P Barron 1–7, D Madden 0–1, C Madden 0–1.		T Morrissey 0–9, D Morrissey 0–2, J Fox 0–2, P O'Hallroan 0–2, W Shanahan 0–1, M Carr 0–1, C Carroll 0–1.

31 August 2018 Round 3	Murroe-Boher	2–20 – 1–10	Cappamore	Fr. Hayes Memorial Park, Caherconlish

1 September 2018 Round 3	South Liberties	0–14 – 1–17	Monaleen	Childers Road, Limerick
	B Nash 0–8, B Ryan 0–5, D O'Neill 0–1.		M O'Dwyer 0–10, D Power 1–0, C Nicholas 0–2, D Moloney 0–1, P Russell 0–1, D Golden 0–1, E Doyle 0–1, L Lyons 0–1.

8 September 2018 Round 4	Cappamore	3–11 – 1–18	Knockainey	Kilteely Sportsfield, Kilteely
	T O'Donoghue 1–8, D Deere 1–1, J Lonergan 1–0, D Lonergan 0–1, D Shanahan 0–1.		P Barron 1–13, C Cleary 0–2, M O'Grady 0–2, S Walsh 0–1.

8 September 2018 Round 4	Monaleen	0–17 – 1–15	Murroe-Boher	Childers Road, Limerick
	M O'Dwyer 0–13, L Murphy 0–4.		S Tobin 0–10, R Kennedy 1–1, P Tobin 0–2, M Ryan 0–1, D Sheehan 0–1.

9 September 2018 Round 4	Ahane	0–15 – 1–15	South Liberties	Portnard Sportsfield, Cappamore
	T Morrissey 0–10, W Shanahan 0–3, M Carr 0–1, N Moran 0–1.		B Ryan 0–9, B Garry 1–0, S O'Neill 0–2, D O'Neill 0–2, Barry Nash 0–1, Brian Nash 0–1.

23 September 2018 Round 5	Monaleen	1–15 – 0–17	Ahane	Portnard Sportsfield, Cappamore
	M O'Dwyer 0–8, C Nicholas 1–0, L Lyons 0–3, D Moloney 0–1, A La Touche-Cosgrave 0–1, P Russell 0–1, L Murphy 0–1.		T Morrissey 0–11, J Fox 0–2, C Barry 0–2, W Brennan 0–1, E Carroll 0–1.

23 September 2018 Round 5	South Liberties	1–12 – 1–11	Cappamore	FitzGerald Park, Kilmallock
	B Ryan 0–6, S Garry 1–1, B Nash 0–2, C McSweeney 0–1, D O'Neill 0–1, E Godfrey 0–1.		T O'Donoghue 0–6, B Creamer 1–0, C Sheehan 0–3, P O'Brien 0–1, J Lonergan 0–1.

23 September 2018 Round 5	Knockainey	2–11 – 2–16	Murroe-Boher	Bruff Sportsfield, Bruff
	K Cleary 1–1, B O'Shea 1–0, P Barron 0–3, K Moloney 0–2, M O'Grady 0–2, R Lonergan 0–1, J Lonergan 0–1, D Walsh 0–1.		S Tobin 1–8, M Ryan 1–4, P Tobin 0–2, D Sheehan 0–1, C Byrnes 0–1.

=== Knock-out stage ===
==== Quarter-finals ====
7 October 2018 Quarter-final	Kilmallock	4–27 – 0–13	Murroe-Boher	Gaelic Grounds, Limerick
	P O'Brien 1–9, O O'Reilly 1–2, J Mulcahy 1–1, R Hanley 1–1, G Mulcahy 0–3, K O'Donnell 0–3, R Egan 0–2, G O'Mahony 0–2, P O'Reilly 0–1, M Houlihan 0–1, A Costello 0–1, P O'Loughlin 0–1.		S Tobin 0–5, P Tobin 0–3, M Ryan 0–2, A Kennedy 0–2, D Sheehan 0–1.	Referee: J O'Mahony (Kildimo-Pallaskenry)

7 October 2018 Quarter-final	Patrickswell	1–26 – 1–13	South Liberties	Gaelic Grounds, Limerick
	A Gillane 0–8, T O'Brien 1–1, J Kelleher 0–3, D Byrnes 0–3, L Considine 0–3, C Carroll 0–2, C Lynch 0–2, P Harty 0–1, J Gillane 0–1, S O'Brien 0–1, D Ahern 0–1.		B Ryan 1–9, D O'Neill 0–1, B Nash 0–1, C McSweeney 0–1, M Keane 0–1.	Referee: J O'Halloran (Bruree)

==== Semi-finals ====
14 October 2018 Semi-final	Doon	2–17 – 0–22	Patrickswell	Gaelic Grounds, Limerick
	B Murphy 0–8, P Ryan 1–2, D Coleman 1–0, D Stapleton 0–3, D O'Donovan 0–2, J Ryan 0–1, D Moloney 0–1.		A Gillane 0–9, C Carroll 0–5, T O'Brien 0–3, D Byrnes 0–3, L Considine 0–2.	Referee: M Sexton (Bruree)

14 October 2018 Semi-final	Kilmallock	2–15 – 2–19	Na Piarsaigh	Gaelic Grounds, Limerick
	G Mulcahy 1–2, O O'Reilly 1–1, K O'Donnell 0–4, G O'Mahony 0–3, P O'Brien 0–2, P O'Reilly 0–1, R Hanley 0–1, J Mulcahy 0–1.		A Breen 2–1, S Dowling 0–7, P Casey 0–3, A Dempsey 0–3, C Boylan 0–1, D Dempsey 0–1, G Brown 0–1, C Houlihan 0–1, K Downes 0–1.	Referee: J Mullins (St. Kieran's)

==== Final ====
27 October 2018 Final	Na Piarsaigh	2–22 – 3–10	Doon	Gaelic Grounds, Limerick
	S Dowling (0–12, 7 frees, 1 65); A Breen (1–2); D Dempsey (1–1); A Dempsey (0–4): P Casey (0–3).	Report	B Murphy (1–7, frees); P Ryan, D Coleman (1–1 each); D O’Donovan (0–1).	Referee: J O’Mahony (Kildimo/Pallaskenry)

== Championship statistics ==
=== Top scorers ===
Overall

Rank	Player	County	Tally	Total	Matches	Average
1	Shane Dowling	Na Piarsaigh	1–65	68	7	9.71
2	Barry Murphy	Doon	1–55	58	7	8.28
3	Aaron Gillane	Patrickswell	3–43	52	7	7.42
