= 2015 Limerick Senior Hurling Championship =

Annual hurling competition season

- Dates: 30 April – 11 October 2015
- Teams: 12
- Champions: Na Piarsaigh (3rd title); Cathal King (captain); Shane O'Neill (manager)
- Runners-up: Patrickswell; Barry Foley (captain); Ciarán Carey (manager)
- Relegated: Croom; Effin

Tournament statistics
- Matches played: 36
- Goals scored: 106 (2.94 per match)
- Points scored: 1061 (29.47 per match)
- Top scorer(s): Willie Griffin (3–50)

The 2015 Limerick Senior Hurling Championship was the 121st staging of the Limerick Senior Hurling Championship since its establishment by the Limerick County Board in 1887. The championship ran from 30 April to 11 October 2015.

Kilmallock entered the championship as the defending champions, however, they were beaten by Na Piarsaigh in the semi-finals. Croom and Effin were relegated.

The final was played on 11 October 2015 at the Gaelic Grounds in Limerick, between Na Piarsaigh and Patrickswell, in what was their first ever meeting in the final. Na Piarsaigh won the match by 1–22 to 4–12 to claim their third championship title overall and a first title in two years.

Adare's Willie Griffin was the championship's top scorer with 3–50.

== Team changes ==
=== To Championship ===
Promoted from the Limerick Premier Intermediate Hurling Championship

- Bruff
- Croom

=== From Championship ===
Relegated to the Limerick Premier Intermediate Hurling Championship

- Granagh-Ballingarry
- Knockainey

== Group 1 ==
=== Group 1 table ===
Advance to semi-finals Advance to quarter-finals Relegated

Team	Matches				Score			Pts
Team	Pld	W	D	L	For	Against	Diff	Pts
Patrickswell	5	5	0	0	128	69	59	10
Kilmallock	5	4	0	1	113	76	37	8
Ahane	5	2	0	3	88	88	0	4
South Liberties	5	1	1	3	73	103	−30	3
Murroe/Boher	5	1	1	3	87	111	−4	3
Effin	5	0	2	3	73	115	−42	2

=== Group 1 results ===
30 April 2015 Round 1	Kilmallock	2–14 – 1–13	Ahane	Fr Hayes Memorial Park
	E Ryan 0–10, G Mulcahy 2–1, G O'Mahony 0–3.		J Meskell 1–8, F Aherne 0–2, J Fox 0–2, K Enright 0–1.

1 May 2015 Round 1	Murroe/Boher	1–14 – 2–12	South Liberties	Cappamore Grounds
	S Tobin 0–10, M Ryan 1–2, D Kennedy 0–1, D Sheehan 0–1.		B Ryan 2–4, B Nash 0–4, J Butler 0–1, C O'Neill 0–1, W Hickey 0–1, T Ryan 0–1.

3 May 2015 Round 1	Patrickswell	3–24 – 1–07	Effin	Bruff Grounds
	K O'Brien 3–3, L Considine 0–5, J Kelleher 0–4, C Lynch 0–3, S O'Brien 0–2, T Sheehan 0–2, T O'Brien 0–2, M Carmody 0–1, D Byrnes 0–1, A Gillane 0–1.		T Quaid 1–5, J Quaid 0–1, K Dillon 0–1.

29 May 2015 Round 2	Ahane	1–14 – 2–10	Effin	Bruff Grounds
	J Meskell 0–5, J Fox 1–0, N Moran 0–2, F Ahern 0–2, D Morrissey 0–2, S Power 0–1, M Carr 0–1, K Enright 0–1.		T Quaid 1–5, D Sheehy 1–1, E Kelly 0–2, P O'Kelly 0–1, T Rea 0–1.

29 May 2015 Round 2	Kilmallock	3–15 – 1–12	South Liberties	Bruff Grounds
	P O'Loughlin 3–0, E Ryan 0–9, K O'Donnell 0–2, R Egan 0–2, P O'Brien 0–1, R Hanley 0–1.		B Ryan 1–3, T Ryan 0–6, D O'Neill 0–2, B Nash 0–1.

30 May 2015 Round 2	Murroe/Boher	0–16 – 6–15	Patrickswell	Childers Road
	S Tobin 0–11, M Ryan 0–2, A Kennedy 0–1, K Tobin 0–1, B Mackay 0–1.		T O'Brien 2–4, L Considine 2–3, K O'Brien 2–0, J Kelleher 0–4, M Carmody 0–2, T Sheehan 0–1, O McNamara 0–1.

24 June 2015 Round 3	Effin	2–13 – 0–19	South Liberties	Bruff Grounds
	T Quaid 2–11, D Sheehy 0–2.		T Ryan 0–8, B Ryan 0–5, M Keane 0–2, J Butler 0–2, Brian Nash 0–1, Barry Nash 0–1.

25 June 2015 Round 3	Kilmallock	4–13 – 0–17	Murroe/Boher	Fr Hayes Memorial Park
	G Mulcahy 1–4, G O'Mahony 1–2, P Doona 1–1, R Egan 1–0, P O'Brien 0–2, J Mulcahy 0–1, B Hennessy 0–1, K O'Donnell 0–1, P O'Loughlin 0–1.		S Tobin 0–8, K Tobin 0–3, S Hickey 0–2, P McNamara 0–1, J O'Connor 0–1, C Byrnes 0–1, D Dunlea 0–1.

27 June 2015 Round 3	Ahane	1–12 – 2–18	Patrickswell	Childers Road
	N Moran 0–6, J Fox 1–0, D Morrissey 0–3, T Morrissey 0–2, M Carr 0–1.		J Kelleher 0–8, K O'Brien 1–3, L Considine 1–2, T O'Brien 0–2, A Carroll 0–2, C Lynch 0–1.

2 August 2015 Round 4	Kilmallock	0–25 – 0–07	Effin	Michael Fox Park
	J Mulcahy 0–7, G Mulcahy 0–4, R Egan 0–4, G O'Mahony 0–2, P O'Brien 0–2, R Hanley 0–2, K Kennelly 0–1, K O'Donnell 0–1, C Barry 0–1, P O'Loughlin 0–1.		T Quaid 0–5, N Quaid 0–1, J Quaid 0–1.

2 August 2015 Round 4	Patrickswell	0–17 – 0–09	South Liberties	Gaelic Grounds
	J Kelleher 0–8, P Harty 0–3, L Considine 0–2, D Byrnes 0–2, M Carmody 0–1, T O'Brien 0–1.		B Ryan 0–6, D O'Neill 0–1, D Garry 0–1, S O'Neill 0–1.

2 August 2015 Round 4	Ahane	1–11 – 1–13	Murroe/Boher	Fr Hayes Memorial Park
	M Carr 0–8, T Morrissey 1–1, S Power 0–1, K Enright 0–1.		S Tobin 0–10, P McNamara 1–0, P Tobin 0–2, C Byrnes 0–1.

29 August 2015 Round 5	Ahane	2–20 – 0–12	South Liberties	Fr Hayes Memorial Park
	N Moran 1–4, J Meskell 0–6, S Power 1–1, K Enright 0–3, P Morrissey 0–2, T Morrissey 0–2, R Ryan 0–1, J Fox 0–1.		T Ryan 0–4, B Ryan 0–3, Barry Nash 0–2, D O'Neill 0–1, Brian Nash 0–1, B McSweeney 0–1.

29 August 2015 Round 5	Effin	1–18 – 1–18	Murroe/Boher	Bruff Grounds
	T Quaid 0–11, D Sheehy 1–1, E Kelly 0–3, D Moloney 0–1, K Dillon 0–1, N Quaid 0–1.		S Tobin 0–8, P McNamara 1–1, D Kennedy 0–4, D Sheehan 0–2, K Tobin 0–2, M Ryan 0–1.

30 August 2015 Round 5	Kilmallock	0–19 – 1–18	Patrickswell	Bruff Grounds
	J Mulcahy 0–6, G Mulcahy 0–4, G O'Mahony 0–2, R Egan 0–2, B Burke 0–2, P O'Brien 0–1, K O'Donnell 0–1, A Costello 0–1.		L Considine 0–4, K O'Brien 1–0, J Kelleher 0–3, C Lynch 0–2, A Gillane 0–2, A Carroll 0–2, D Byrnes 0–1, P Harty 0–1, T O'Brien 0–1, M Carmody 0–1, T Sheehan 0–1.

== Group 2 ==
=== Group 2 table ===
Advance to semi-finals Advance to quarter-finals Relegated

Team	Matches				Score			Pts
Team	Pld	W	D	L	For	Against	Diff	Pts
Na Piarsaigh	5	4	1	0	136	88	48	8
Adare	5	2	3	0	110	83	27	7
Doon	5	3	0	2	119	77	42	6
Ballybrown	5	2	1	2	93	93	0	5
Bruff	5	1	0	4	61	128	−67	2
Croom	5	0	1	4	68	118	−50	1

=== Group 2 results ===
1 May 2015 Round 1	Na Piarsaigh	3–13 – 2–14	Doon	FitzGerald Park
	D Breen 2–0, D Sheppard 1–2, S Dowling 0–4, A Breen 0–2, R Lynch 0–2, A Dempsey 0–2, D Dempsey 0–1.		M Fitzgerald 1–3, D O'Donovan 1–2, B Murphy 0–5, D Stapelton 0–1, M Ryan 0–1, M Barry 0–1, N Maher 0–1.

1 May 2015 Round 1	Adare	0–14 – 0–14	Ballybrown	Páirc na nGael
	W Griffin 0–6, D Hannon 0–2, A O'Connell 0–2, PJ Hall 0–2, C McCarthy 0–1, J Fitzgibbon 0–1.		A O'Connor 0–9, B Griffin 0–2, J Hall 0–1, M Sheehan 0–1, D Hall 0–1.

2 May 2015 Round 1	Bruff	1–13 – 1–10	Croom	FitzGerald Park
	J Cooke 1–4, S Bulfin 0–7, S Finn 0–1, C Browne 0–1.		T Carmody 0–5, P Lawlor 1–0, C Allis 0–2, C Laffan 0–2, J Carroll 0–1.

29 May 2015 Round 2	Na Piarsaigh	2–18 – 0–18	Ballybrown	Childers Road
	S Dowling 1–4, A Breen 1–3, D Dempsey 0–3, K Downes 0–3, W O'Donoghue 0–2, D Sheppard 0–1, K Ryan 0–1, P Casey 0–1.		S Kenny 0–7, A Cliffe 0–3, D Kenny 0–2, J Hall 0–2, M Sheehan 0–2, L Doolan 0–1, D Hall 0–1.

30 May 2015 Round 2	Adare	1–13 – 2–10	Croom	Bruff Grounds
	J Fitzgibbon 0–5, W Griffin 0–5, D Hannon 1–0, A O'Connell 0–2, C McCarthy 0–1.		C Laffan 1–3, T Carmody 0–5, D Sexton 1–0, M Reidy 0–1, C Behan 0–1.

30 May 2015 Round 2	Doon	2–18 – 0–08	Bruff	Fr Hayes Memorial Park
	M Fitzgerald 1–2, C McNamara 0–5, N Maher 0–4, D Coleman 1–0, D O'Donovan 0–3, P Ryan 0–2, M Ryan 0–1, B Murphy 0–1.		S Bulfin 0–4, J Cooke 0–1, C Browne 0–1, P O'Leary 0–1, D Madden 0–1.

25 June 2015 Round 3	Adare	3–16 – 2–19	Na Piarsaigh	Clarina Grounds
	W Griffin 1–9, M Mackey 2–1, J Fitzgibbon 0–3, D Hannon 0–1, A O'Connell 0–1, L O'Brien 0–1.		S Dowling 0–10, A Breen 2–3, D Breen 0–2, K Downes 0–2, P Casey 0–1, D Dempsey 0–1.

27 June 2015 Round 3	Ballybrown	1–19 – 1–12	Bruff	The Bog Garden
	A O'Connor 0–12, M Kiely 1–1, D Hall 0–3, S Kenny 0–1, B Griffin 0–1, D Kenny 0–1.		J Cooke 1–1, S Bulfin 0–3, P O'Leary 0–2, C Madden 0–2, J Hayes 0–2, T Burke 0–1, S Finn 0–1.

31 July 2015 Round 4	Ballybrown	2–18 – 1–12	Croom	Páirc an Chrócaigh
	A O'Connor 1–11, S Kenny 1–1, M Kiely 0–2, M Sheehan 0–2, D Hall 0–1, B Griffin 0–1.		C Allis 0–6, C Laffan 1–1, D Sexton 0–1, PJ Cregan 0–1, R O'Shea 0–1, P Reidy 0–1, P Lawlor 0–1.

2 August 2015 Round 4	Na Piarsaigh	6–17 – 2–05	Bruff	Childers Road
	D Dempsey 2–2, P Casey 1–5, K Downes 2–0, A Breen 1–3, K Ryan 0–3, D Sheppard 0–2, D Breen 0–1, R Lynch 0–1.		J Cooke 1–0, T Burke 1–0, C Madden 0–2, C Browne 0–1, D Madden 0–1, S Bulfin 0–1.

2 August 2015 Round 4	Adare	2–15 – 1–15	Doon	Gaelic Grounds
	W Griffin 1–5, J Fitzgibbon 1–4, D Hannon 0–3, L O'Brien 0–1, N Mulvihill 0–1, A O'Connell 0–1.		M Fitzgerald 1–3, C McNamara 0–5, D Coleman 0–3, N Maher 0–1, P Ryan 0–1, M McKenna 0–1, B Murphy 0–1.

14 August 2015 Round 3	Doon	5–17 – 1–07	Croom	FitzGerald Park
	N Maher 1–3, C McNamara 0–5, D Coleman 1–1, B Murphy 0–4, M Fitzgerald 1–0, D O'Donovan 1–0, M McKenna 1–0, D Moloney 0–3, P Ryan 0–1.		S O'Kelly 1–0, C Laffan 0–3, C Allis 0–2, J Malone 0–1, P Brennan 0–1.

30 August 2015 Round 5	Doon	1–22 – 2–09	Ballybrown	FitzGerald Park
	D Coleman 1–2, C McNamara 0–5, P Ryan 0–4, M Fitzgerald 0–3, B Murphy 0–3, D O'Donovan 0–2, D Moloney 0–2, R Maher 0–1.		A O'Connor 1–3, D Hall 1–1, M Kiely 0–2, S Kenny 0–2, J Adams 0–1.

30 August 2015 Round 5	Adare	5–19 – 1–07	Bruff	Childers Road
	W Griffin 1–6, J Fitzgibbon 1–4, D Hannon 1–2, L O'Brien 1–2, E Ryan 1–0, C McCarthy 0–1, L Costelloe 0–1, M Mackey 0–1, D Sexton 0–1, K Hannon 0–1.		B Finn 1–1, S Bulfin 0–3, S Finn 0–1, K Dillon 0–1, S Bulfin 0–1.

30 August 2015 Round 5	Na Piarsaigh	4–18 – 0–14	Croom	Clarina Grounds
	K Downes 2–2, S Dowling 0–7, D Breen 1–2, A Breen 1–0, D Dempsey 0–3, P Casey 0–2, K Ryan 0–1, P Gleeson 0–1.		C Allis 0–10, S Cahill 0–3, G Flynn 0–1

== Knockout stage ==
=== Quarter-finals ===
19 September 2015 Quarter-final	Adare	0–17 – 0–17	Ahane	FitzGerald Park
	W Griffin 0–7, D Hannon 0–3, C McCarthy 0–2, J Fitzgibbon 0–2, M Mackey 0–1, L O'Brien 0–1, D Sexton 0–1.		J Meskell 0–11, J Fox 0–2, T Morrissey 0–2, K Enright 0–1, M Carr 0–1.

20 September 2015 Quarter-final	Doon	0–15 – 1–14	Kilmallock	Gaelic Grounds
	B Murphy 0–4, D Moloney 0–3, D Coleman 0–3, P Ryan 0–2, D O'Donovan 0–1, N Maher 0–1, M Barry 0–1.		J Mulcahy 0–5, P O'Brien 1–1, R Egan 0–2, G Mulcahy 0–2, P O'Loughlin 0–1, O O'Reilly 0–1, B O'Sullivan 0–1, G O'Mahony 0–1.

27 September 2015 Quarter-final replay	Adare	1–20 – 2–10	Ahane	Gaelic Grounds
	W Griffin 0–9, M Mackey 1–1, J Fitzgibbon 0–4, D Hannon 0–4, D Sexton 0–1, C McCarthy 0–1.		J Fox 1–2, N Moran 1–1, J Meskell 0–3, R Ryan 0–2, T Morrissey 0–1, K Enright 0–1.

=== Semi-finals ===
27 September 2015 Semi-final	Kilmallock	2–13 – 0–20	Na Piarsaigh	Gaelic Grounds
	J Mulcahy 0–7, R Hanley 2–0, P O'Loughlin 0–2, O O'Reilly 0–2, K O'Donnell 0–1, G O'Mahony 0–1.	Report	S Dowling 0–7, P Casey 0–5, A Breen 0–3, A Dempsey 0–3, W O'Donoghue 0–2.

4 October 2015 Semi-final	Adare	0–08 – 2–24	Patrickswell	Gaelic Grounds
	W Griffin 0–3, D Hannon 0–1, J Fitzgibbon 0–1, A O'Connell 0–1, D Sexton 0–1, J Gahan 0–1.		J Kelleher 0–7, D Byrnes 0–7, L Considine 1–3, T O'Brien 1–2, A Gillane 0–2, A Carroll 0–1, K O'Brien 0–1, C Lynch 0–1.

=== Final ===
11 October 2015 Final	Na Piarsaigh	1–22 – 4–12	Patrickswell	Gaelic Grounds
	K Downes 1–5, S Dowling 0–6 (4fs), P Casey, K Ryan 0–3 each, A Dempsey 0–2, W O'Donoghue, C King, D Dempsey 0–1 each.	Report	D Byrnes 2–2 (2–0 pens, 2fs), T O'Brien 1–1, K O'Brien 1–0, J Kelleher 0–3 (3f), C Lynch, L Considine 0–2 each, S O'Brien, A Gillane 0–1 each.	Referee: M Sexton

== Championship statistics ==
=== Top scorers ===
Overall

Rank	Player	Club	Tally	Total	Matches	Average
1	Willie Griffin	Adare	3–50	59	8	7.37
2	Tommy Quaid	Effin	4–37	49	5	9.80
3	Seán Tobin	Murroe/Boher	0–47	47	5	9.40
4	Alan O'Connor	Ballybrown	2–35	41	4	10.25
4	Shane Dowling	Na Piarsaigh	1–38	41	6	6.83
6	Jack Kelleher	Patrickswell	0–37	37	7	5.28
7	John Meskell	Ahane	1–33	36	7	5.14
8	Lar Considine	Patrickswell	4–21	33	7	4.71
9	Kevin O'Brien	Patrickswell	8–07	31	6	5.16
10	Brian Ryan	South Liberties	3–21	30	5	6.00
10	John Fitzgibbon	Adare	2–24	30	7	4.28

Single game

Rank	Player	Club	Tally	Total	Opposition
1	Tommy Quaid	Effin	2–11	17	South Liberties
2	Alan O'Connor	Ballybrown	1–11	14	Croom
3	Kevin O'Brien	Patrickswell	3–03	12	Effin
3	Willie Griffin	Adare	1–09	12	Na Piarsaigh
3	Alan O'Connor	Ballybrown	0–12	12	Bruff
6	John Meskell	Ahane	1–08	11	Kilmallock
6	John Meskell	Ahane	0–11	11	Adare
6	Tommy Quaid	Effin	0–11	11	Murroe/Boher
6	Seán Tobin	Murroe/Boher	0–11	11	Patrickswell
10	Thomas O'Brien	Patrickswell	2–04	10	Murroe/Boher
10	Brian Ryan	South Liberties	2–04	10	Murroe/Boher
10	Shane Dowling	Na Piarsaigh	0–10	10	Adare
10	Conor Allis	Croom	0–10	10	Na Piarsaigh
10	Seán Tobin	Murroe/Boher	0–10	10	South Liberties
10	Seán Tobin	Murroe/Boher	0–10	10	Ahane
10	Eoin Ryan	Kilmallock	0–10	10	Ahane
