= 2013 Limerick Senior Hurling Championship =

Annual hurling competition season

- Dates: 10 May – 6 October 2013
- Teams: 16
- Sponsor: Hyundai Motor Centre
- Champions: Na Piarsaigh (3rd title); James O'Brien (captain); Seán Stack (manager)
- Runners-up: Adare; Wayne McNamara (captain); Dave Keane (manager)
- Relegated: Bruree; Croom; Garryspillane; Hospital-Herbertstown

Tournament statistics
- Top scorer(s): Declan Hannon (4–39)

The 2013 Limerick Senior Hurling Championship was the 119th staging of the Limerick Senior Hurling Championship since its establishment in 1887. The championship began on 2013 and is ended on 6 October 2013.

Kilmallock were the defending champions, however, they were defeated in the semi-final stage. Na Piarsaigh won the title following a 0–14 to 0–12 defeat of Adare in the final.

== Group 1 ==
=== Group 1 table ===
Pos	Team	Pld	W	D	L	SF	SA	Diff	Pts	Notes
1	Ahane	3	3	0	0	10–43	1–34	36	6	
2	South Liberties	3	2	0	1	1–40	3–29	5	4	
3	Garryspillane	3	1	0	2	3–39	4–45	−9	2	
4	Croom	3	0	0	3	2–33	8–47	−32	0	

=== Group 1 results ===
10 May 2013 Round 1	Garryspillane	1–17 – 2–12	Croom	FitzGerald Park
	D Ryan 0–8, C Hickey 1–1, J Ryan 0–4, T Harty 0–1, V Sheehan 0–1, G Power 0–1, K Hickey 0–1.		E Burchill 2–1, C Allis 0–5, T Carmody 0–3, S Cahill 0–2, P Reidy 0–1.

11 May 2013 Round 1	Ahane	2–09 – 0–11	South Liberties	Fr Hayes memorial Park
	R Ryan 1–7, T Morrissey 1–0, J Meskell 0–1, N Moran 0–1.		T Ryan 0–6, A Owens 0–2, B Foley 0–1, D Clifford 0–1.

15 June 2013 Round 2	Garryspillane	1–12 – 1–15	Ahane	Bruff Grounds
				Referee: D O'Driscoll (Ballinacurra Gaels)

16 June 2013 Round 2	South Liberties	0–11 – 0–10	Croom	Bruff Grounds
	B Nash 0–7, B Foley 0–2, A Owens 0–1, R O'Neill 0–1.		C Allis 0–8, P Reidy 0–1, C Laffan 0–1.

2 August 2013 Round 3	Garryspillane	1–10 – 1–18	South Liberties	Bruff Grounds
	D Ryan 0–7, G Power 1–0, J Ryan 0–1, T Harty 0–1, D Hayes 0–1.		Mark Keane 0–11, W Hickey 1–0, B Nash 0–2, T Ryan 0–2, Mike Keane 0–1, S Garry 0–1, B Foley 0–1.

2 August 2013 Round 3	Ahane	7–19 – 0–11	Croom	Gaelic Grounds
	T Morrissey 2–2, P O'Halloran 2–2, S O'Connor 2–1, R Ryan 0–6, N Moran 0–5, J Meskell 1–1, D Laing 0–1, M Foley 0–1.		C Laffan 0–5, C Allis 0–2, E Burchill 0–2, E O'Farrell 0–1, G Flynn 0–1.

== Group 2 ==
=== Group 2 table ===
Pos	Team	Pld	W	D	L	SF	SA	Diff	Pts	Notes
1	Doon	3	3	0	0	5–47	4–41	9	6	
2	Na Piarsaigh	3	2	0	1	6–44	3–37	16	4	
3	Patrickswell	3	1	0	2	4–46	4–36	10	2	
4	Granagh-Ballingarry	3	0	0	3	2–29	6–52	−25	0	

=== Group 2 results ===
12 May 2013 Round 1	Doon	3–10 – 0–18	Patrickswell	Bruff Grounds
	P Ryan 2–2, D Coleman 1–0, C McNamara 0–3, M Ryan 0–3, D O'Donovan 0–1, N Maher 0–1.		K O'Brien 0–4, J Kelleher 0–4, D Byrnes 0–3, M Carmody 0–2, S O'Brien 0–2, T O'Brien 0–2, P Howard 0–1.

12 May 2013 Round 1	Na Piarsaigh	2–16 – 1–08	Granagh-Ballingarry	Clarina Grounds
	S Dowling 2–6, K Downes 0–4, A Breen 0–3, D Breen 0–2, K Ryan 0–1.		E Chawke 1–6, B Hanley 0–2.

16 June 2013 Round 2	Granagh-Ballingarry	0–08 – 3–16	Patrickswell	FitzGerald Park
	E Chawke 0–4, E Kennedy 0–2, D O'Connor 0–1, B Hanley 0–1.		J Kelleher 0–10, B Foley 1–1, T O'Brien 1–1, K O'Brien 1–0, L Considine 0–2, S O'Brien 0–1, M Carmody 0–1.

16 June 2013 Round 2	Doon	1–17 – 3–10	Na Piarsaigh	FitzGerald Park
	M Ryan 1–4, C McNamara 0–5, G McPartland 0–2, P Ryan 0–2, N Maher 0–1, D Moloney 0–1, D Coleman 0–1, M Fitzgerald 0–1.		S Dowling 1–5, K Downes 2–1, D Breen 0–1, K Ryan 0–1, P Gleeson 0–1, D Sheppard 0–1.

2 August 2013 Round 3	Doon	1–20 – 1–13	Granagh-Ballingarry	Childers Road
	D Coleman 1–3, M Ryan 0–5, C McNamara 0–4, N Maher 0–2, R Ryan 0–2, D O'Donovan 0–1, D Moloney 0–1, D Sheppard 0–1, G McParland 0–1.		D O'Connor 1–6, E Kennedy 0–4, D O'Grady 0–2, B Hanley 0–1.

3 August 2013 Round 3	Na Piarsaigh	1–18 – 1–12	Patrickswell	Gaelic Grounds
	P Gleeson 0–6, K Ryan 1–0, D Quigley 0–3, A Dempsey 0–3, D Sheppard 0–2, A Breen 0–2, S Dowling 0–2.		J Kelleher 0–6, L Considine 1–2, C Lynch 0–2, K O'Brien 0–1, M Carmody 0–1.

== Group 3 ==
=== Group 3 table ===
Pos	Team	Pld	W	D	L	SF	SA	Diff	Pts	Notes
1	Adare	3	2	0	1	4–50	1–36	23	4	
2	Knockainey	3	2	0	1	3–40	1–37	9	4	
3	Murroe-Boher	3	2	0	1	4–48	5–42	3	4	
4	Bruree	3	0	0	3	4–32	8–55	−35	0	

=== Group 3 results ===
10 May 2013 Round 1	Knockainey	2–13 – 0–11	Bruree	Bruff Grounds
	P Kirby 0–7, J Lonergan 1–0, K Cleary 1–0, M Cleary 0–2, D Madden 0–2, B Cleary 0–1, D Walsh 0–1.		C O'Dea 0–6, S Mullane 0–2, D Linehan 0–1, S Riordan 0–1, M Lane 0–1.

11 May 2013 Round 1	Adare	1–17 – 0–13	Murroe/Boher	Childers Road
	W Griffin 1–5, D Hannon 0–5, P Keane 0–3, J Fitzgibbon 0–2, D Sheehan 0–1, C Fitzgerald 0–1.		S Tobin 0–9, P Walsh 0–1, T O'Brien 0–1, N Tobin 0–1, M Ryan 0–1.

15 June 2013 Round 2	Adare	3–22 – 0–11	Bruree	Ballingarry Grounds
	D Hannon 2–4, W Griffin 1–4, J Fitzgibbon 0–5.

15 June 2013 Round 2	Knockainey	0–15 – 1–15	Murroe/Boher	Fr Hayes Memorial Park
	P Kirby 0–8, M Cleary 0–2, P Barron 0–2, D Madden 0–1, J Lonergan 0–1, L O'Shea 0–1		S Tobin 1–11, D Kitt 0–1, K Tobin 0–1, P Walsh 0–1, P Tobin 0–1.

2 August 2013 Round 3	Adare	0–11 – 1–12	Knockainey	FitzGerald Park
	D Hannon 0–5, D Sexton 0–2, P Keane 0–1, G Ahern 0–1, D Sheehan 0–1, J Hannon 0–1.		L O'Shea 1–0, B O'Shea 0–3, S Lonergan 0–2, N Finch 0–2, P Kirby 0–2, M Cleary 0–1, P Barron 0–1, D Madden 0–1.

2 August 2013 Round 3	Bruree	4–10 – 3–20	Murroe/Boher	Clarina Grounds
	K O'Dea 2–7, D Hogan 1–0, S Riordan 1–0, G O'Dea 0–2, S Mullane 0–1.		D Dunlea 0–8, M Ryan 2–1, P Tobin 0–4, W Tobin 1–0, S Hickey 0–2, J O'Connor 0–1, T O'Brien 0–1, K Tobin 0–1, D Kennedy 0–1, P Walsh 0–1.

== Group 4 ==
=== Group 4 table ===
Pos	Team	Pld	W	D	L	SF	SA	Diff	Pts	Notes
1	Kilmallock	3	3	0	0	11–37	2–37	27	6	
2	Ballybrown	3	2	0	1	6–43	7–20	20	4	
3	Effin	3	1	0	2	5–31	6–28	0	2	
4	Hospital-Herbertstown	3	0	0	3	2–23	9–49	−47	0	

=== Group 4 results ===
12 May 2013 Round 1	Effin	3–06 – 2–14	Ballybrown	FiitzGerald Park
	N Quaid 2–1, T Quaid 1–2, H O'Neill 0–1, E Kelly 0–1, D Moloney 0–1.		A O'Connor 0–11, P McCarthy 2–0, D Hall 0–1, S Kenny 0–1, M Kiely 0–1.	Referee: M Meade

12 May 2013 Round 1	Kilmallock	4–18 – 1–14	Hospital-Herbertstown	Bruree Grounds
	G Mulcahy 3–4, K O'Donnell 1–5, P O'Brien 0–4, E Ryan 0–2, R Egan 0–2, G O'Mahony 0–1.		M Deegan 0–10, K O'Connor 1–1, A Murphy 0–2, J Fitzgerald 0–1.	Referee: D O'Driscoll

14 June 2013 Round 2	Ballybrown	1–14 – 4–08	Kilmallock	Gaelic Grounds
	A O'Connor 1–8, D Byrnes 0–2, S Kenny 0–1, P McCarthy 0–1, D Hartnett 0–1.		K O'Donnell 2–5, P O'Brien 1–0, G Mulcahy 1–0, R Egan 0–2, G O'Mahony 0–1.	Referee: S Hourigan

16 June 2013 Round 2	Hospital-Herbertstown	1–03 – 2–16	Effin Grounds	Michael Fox Park
	B Ryan 1–0, J Fitzgerald 0–3.		T Quaid 0–7, J Quaid 1–2, E Kiely 0–4, C Kearney 1–0, D Moloney 0–3.	Referee: D Richardson

1 August 2013 Round 3	Ballybrown	3–15 – 0–06	Hospital-Herbertstown	Bruree Grounds
	A O'Connor 1–10, D Byrnes 1–1, D Hall 1–1, P McCarthy 0–1, R Griffin 0–1, B Griffin 0–1.		J Fitzgerald 0–4, A Murphy 0–1, R O'Donovan 0–1.	Referee: D Richardson

1 August 2013 Round 3	Kilmallock	3–11 – 0–09	Effin	Michael Fox Park
	E Ryan 1–3, G O'Mahony 1–2, K O'Donnell 0–5, G Mulcahy 1–1.		T Quaid 0–8, S O'Neill 0–1.	Referee: J Murphy

== Knockout stage ==
=== Quarter-finals ===
31 August 2013 Quarter-final	Kilmallock	0–18 – 0–03	Knockainey	Bruff Grounds
	E Ryan 0–8 (2frees), K O’Donnell 0–5 (3frees), P O’Brien 0–2, G Mulcahy, J Mulcahy, G O’Mahony (free) 0–1 each.	Report	M Cleary 0–2, B O'Shea 0–1.	Referee: S Hourigan (St Mary’s/Sean Finn’s)

31 August 2013 Quarter-final	Doon	1–18 – 0–09	South Liberties	Fr Hayes Memorial Park
	M Ryan 0–6 (three frees), D Coleman 1–1, N Maher, D O’Donovan, C McNamara (both frees) and R Ryan 0–2 each, R English, P Ryan and M Fitzgerald 0–1 each.	Report	M Keane 0–8 (five frees), B Slattery 0–1.	Referee: T Mann (Ballybrown)

1 September 2013 Quarter-final	Adare	2–24 – 1–13	Ballybrown	Gaelic Grounds
	D Hannon 1–9 (6f), J Fitzgibbon 0–7, W Griffin 1–2, C Fitzgerald, D Sexton 0–2 each, J Hannon, D Sheehan 0–1 each.	Report	A O’Connor 0–10 (6f, 2 65), S Kenny 1–0, D Hall 0–2, B Griffin 0–1.	Referee: M Meade (Glenroe)

1 September 2013 Quarter-final	Na Piarsaigh	3–16 – 0–07	Ahane	Gaelic Grounds
	S Dowling (0–7, three frees, one 65); K Downes (2–1); A Breen (1–1); K Kennedy, A Dempsey, C King, K Ryan, W O’Donoghue, D Sheppard, B Hartnett (0–1 each).	Report	R Ryan (0–3, two frees, one 65); N Moran (0–2, one sideline); P O’Halloran, O Moran (0–1 each).	Referee: J Mullins (St Kieran's, Ardagh)

=== Semi-finals ===
15 September 2013 Semi-final	Adare	2–17 – 2–15	Doon	Gaelic Grounds
	D Hannon (1–9, 5 frees, one sideline), W Griffin (1–3), J Fitzgibbon (0–2), D Sexton, C Fitzgerald, D Sheehan (0–1 each).	Report	M Ryan (1–4, 2 frees), P Cummins 0–4, P Ryan (1–0), R Ryan (0–3), M Fitzgerald (0–2), C McNamara 0–2 (0-2f).	Referee: R Moloney (Bruff)

15 September 2013 Semi-final	Na Piarsaigh	2–13 – 2–12	Kilmallock	Gaelic Grounds
	S Dowling (1–7, 3 frees, one 65), K Ryan (1–0), A Breen, K Downes (0–2 each), J O’Brien, D Dempsey (0–1 each).	Report	G O’Mahony (1–1, 1–0 pen), K O’Donnell (2 frees, one 65), B O’Sullivan (0–3 each), E Ryan (0–2, one 65), J Mulcahy, G Mulcahy, P O’Brien (0–1 each); K Breen (1–0, Na Piarsaigh own goal).	Referee: S Hourigan (St Mary’s/Sean Finn’s)

=== Final ===
6 October 2013 Final	Na Piarsaigh	0–14 – 0–12	Adare	Gaelic Grounds
	K Downes, S Dowling (4fs) (0–4 each), A Breen, A Dempsey (0–2 each), D Dempsey, D Sheppard (0–1 each).	Report	D Hannon (0–7, 6fs), J Fitzgibbon, D Sexton (0–2 each), C Fitzgerald (0–1).	Referee: J Murphy (Ballylanders/Glenroe)

== Championship statistics ==
=== Top scorers ===
Rank	Player	Club	Tally	Total	Matches	Average
1	Declan Hannon	Adare	4–39	51	6	8.50
2	Alan O'Connor	Ballybrown	2–39	45	4	11.25
3	Shane Dowling	Na Piarsaigh	4–31	43	6	7.16
4	Kevin O'Donnell	Kilmallock	3–23	32	5	6.40
5	Michael Ryan	Doon	2–22	28	5	5.60
