= 2017 Limerick Senior Hurling Championship =

Annual hurling competition season

- Dates: 5 May – 15 October 2017
- Teams: 12
- Sponsor: Hyundai Limerick Motor Centre
- Champions: Na Piarsaigh (4th title); Cathal King (captain); Shane O'Neill (manager)
- Runners-up: Kilmallock; Liam Hurley (captain); James Connery (manager)
- Relegated: Bruff

The 2017 Limerick Senior Hurling Championship was the 123rd staging of the Limerick Senior Hurling Championship since its establishment by the Limerick County Board in 1887. The championship ran from 5 May to 15 October 2017.

Patrickswell entered the championship as the defending champions, however, they were beaten by Kilmallock in the semi-finals. Bruff were relegated.

The final was played on 15 October 2017 at the Gaelic Grounds in Limerick, between Na Piarsaigh and Kilmallock, in what was their first ever meeting in the final. Na Piarsaigh won the match by 1–22 to 2–14 to claim their fourth championship title overall and a first title in two years.

== Team changes ==
=== To Championship ===
Promoted from the Limerick Premier Intermediate Hurling Championship

- Cappamore
- Monaleen

=== From Championship ===
Relegated to the Limerick Premier Intermediate Hurling Championship

- Bruree
- Murroe/Boher

== Group stage ==
=== Group 1 ===
==== Group 1 Table ====
Pos	Team	Pld	W	D	L	For	Ag.	Diff.	Pts.
1	Kilmallock	5	5	0	0	142	94	48	10
2	Doon	5	4	0	1	117	81	36	8
3	Ballybrown	5	2	1	2	112	96	16	5
4	Ahane	5	2	1	2	90	86	4	5
5	South Liberties	5	1	0	4	74	120	−46	2
6	Bruff	5	0	0	5	82	140	−58	0

==== Group 1 Round 1 ====
6 May 2017; 19:00	South Liberties	0–19 – 0–18	Bruff	Fr. Hayes Memorial Park, Caherconlish; Referee: M Doherty (Rathkeale)
6 May 2017; 19:00	B Ryan 0–10, W Hickey 0–2, C McSweeney 0–2, D O'Neill 0–2, M Keane 0–2, B Nash 0–1.		S Bulfin 0–10, M O'Donnell 0–3, K Dillon 0–3, C Browne 0–2.	Fr. Hayes Memorial Park, Caherconlish; Referee: M Doherty (Rathkeale)

6 May 2017; 7:30pm	Doon	1–12 – 0–11	Ahane	Cappamore Sportsfield, Cappamore; Referee: J Mullins (St. Kieran's)
6 May 2017; 7:30pm	D Coleman 1–2, B Murphy 0–4, M Ryan 0–2, D O'Donovan 0–2, P Ryan 0–1, J Hayes 0–1.		N Moran 0–10, M Carr 0–1.	Cappamore Sportsfield, Cappamore; Referee: J Mullins (St. Kieran's)

7 May 2017; 7:00pm	Kilmallock	5–18 – 1–19	Ballybrown	Bruff Sportsfield, Bruff; Referee: D O'Driscoll (Ballinacurra Gaels)
7 May 2017; 7:00pm	O O'Reilly 2–1, R Hanley 2–0, P O'Brien 1–3, E Ryan 0–6, G Mulcahy 0–2, D Joy 0–1, J Mulcahy 0–1, G O'Mahony 0–1, K O'Donnell 0–1, C O'Connor 0–1, M Houlihan 0–1.		A O'Connor 0–5, J Adams 0–5, D Hall 0–4, B Griffin 1–0, R Griffin 0–1, R Kenny 0–1, M Sheehan 0–1, K Power 0–1, L Doolan 0–1.	Bruff Sportsfield, Bruff; Referee: D O'Driscoll (Ballinacurra Gaels)

==== Group 1 Round 2 ====
12 May 2017; 7:30pm	Bruff	2–13 – 4–24	Doon	Fr. Hayes Memorial Park, Caherconlish; Referee: D O'Driscoll (Ballinacurra Gaels)
12 May 2017; 7:30pm	S Bulfin 1–6, D Browne 1–0, K Dillons 0–3, P Browne 0–2, C Madden 0–1, S Finn 0–1.		P Ryan 2–2, D O'Donovan 1–5, B Murphy 0–6, D Stapelton 1–1, M Ryan 0–4, D Coleman 0–4, D Moloney 0–2.	Fr. Hayes Memorial Park, Caherconlish; Referee: D O'Driscoll (Ballinacurra Gaels)

13 May 2017; 6:00pm	Ahane	1–16 – 0–19	Ballybrown	Gaelic Grounds, Limerick; Referee: J Murphy (Glenroe)
13 May 2017; 6:00pm	T Morrissey 0–10, N Moran 1–2, M Carr 0–2, K Enright 0–1, J Fox 0–1.		A O'Connor 0–14, L Doolan 0–2, B Griffin 0–1, K Galvin 0–1, D Hall 0–1.	Gaelic Grounds, Limerick; Referee: J Murphy (Glenroe)

13 May 2017; 7:30pm	Kilmallock	3–18 – 3–14	South Liberties	Bruff Sportsfield, Bruff; Referee: É Stapleton (Doon)
13 May 2017; 7:30pm	G Mulcahy 1–6, G O'Mahony 1–3, C O'Connor 1–0, P O'Brien 0–3, J Mulcahy 0–2, E Ryan 0–2, P O'Loughlin 0–1, O O'Reilly 0–1.		B Ryan 1–10, S Garry 1–1, S Kilcoyne 1–0, B Nash 0–1, M Keane 0–1, D O'Neill 0–1.	Bruff Sportsfield, Bruff; Referee: É Stapleton (Doon)

==== Group 1 Round 3 ====
9 June 2017; 7:30pm	Bruff	0–14 – 2–10	Ahane	Fr. Hayes Memorial Park, Caherconlish; Referee: T Mann (Patrickswell)
9 June 2017; 7:30pm	S Bulfin 0–6, C Browne 0–4, P Browne 0–1, K Dillon 0–1, M O'Donnell 0–1.		T Morrissey 1–8, K Enright 1–0, D Laing 0–2.	Fr. Hayes Memorial Park, Caherconlish; Referee: T Mann (Patrickswell)

10 June 2017; 5:45pm	Ballybrown	1–18 – 0–06	South Liberties	Gaelic Grounds, Limerick; Referee: J Mullins (St. Kieran's)
10 June 2017; 5:45pm	A O'Connor 1–11, B Griffin 0–2, S O'Reilly 0–1, R Griffin 0–1, L Doolan 0–1, S Kenny 0–1, A Cliffe 0–1.		B Ryan 0–5, D O'Neill 0–1.	Gaelic Grounds, Limerick; Referee: J Mullins (St. Kieran's)

10 June 2017; 7:30pm	Kilmallock	2–17 – 3–10	Doon	Gaelic Grounds, Limerick; Referee: J O'Mahony (Kildimo-Pallaskenry)
10 June 2017; 7:30pm	R Hanley 2–1, E Ryan 0–5, P O'Brien 0–4, G Mulcahy 0–3, M Houlihan 0–2, G O'Mahony 0–1, J Mulcahy 0–1.		P Ryan 2–1, D O'Donovan 1–3, B Murphy 0–3, D Coleman 0–2, D Moloney 0–1.	Gaelic Grounds, Limerick; Referee: J O'Mahony (Kildimo-Pallaskenry)

==== Group 1 Round 4 ====
29 July 2017; 7 pm	Doon	2–21 – 0–11	South Liberties	Caherconlish
29 July 2017; 7 pm	B Murphy 2–8, D Coleman 0–4, J Hayes 0–4, D Moloney 0–2, D O'Donovan 0–2, P Ryan 0–1.		D O'Neill 0–5, B Nash 0–3, B Ryan 0–2, E Quilty 0–1.	Caherconlish

30 July 2017; 2:45 pm	Ballybrown	4–21 – 1–15	Bruff	Killmallock
30 July 2017; 2:45 pm	A O'Connor 1–8, R Griffin 1–2, S Kenney 1–2, B Griffin 1–1, K Gavin 0–3, D Hall 0–2, S O'Reilly 0–1, A Cliffe 0–1, R Kenny 0–1.		K Dillon 0–8, A Neylon 1–0, B O'Brien 0–3, C Browne 0–2, J Hayes 0–1, P Browne 0–1.	Killmallock

30 July 2017; 7:30 pm	Kilmallock	0–23 – 1–14	Ahane	Gaelic Grounds
30 July 2017; 7:30 pm	E Ryan 0–7, M Houlihan 0–5, G O'Mahony 0–4, J Mulcahy 0–2, P O'Brien 0–1, K O'Donnell 0–1, L Walsh 0–1, R Hanley 0–1, D Woulfe 0–1.		T Morrissey 1–8, M Carr 0–2, D Laing 0–1, K Enright 0–1, D Minehan 0–1, O Moran 0–1.	Gaelic Grounds

==== Group 1 Round 5 ====
8/25/17; 6:30 pm	Kilmallock	3–27 – 0–13	Bruff	Kilbreedy
8/25/17; 6:30 pm	E Ryan 1-8, O O'Reilly 1-5, K O'Donnell 0-6, M Houlihan 0-4, D Woulfe 1-1, G O'Mahony 0-3.		K Dillon 0-3, C Browne 0-3, S Bulfin 0-3, P Browne 0-2, C Madden 0-1, P O'Riordan 0-1.	Kilbreedy

8/27/17; 6:45 pm	South Liberties	1–12 – 2–20	Ahane	Caherconlish
8/27/17; 6:45 pm	B Ryan 0-6, B Nash 1-1, W Hickey 0-1, C McSweeney 0-1, D O'Neill 0-1, S Brosnan 0-1, D Garry 0-1.		T Morrissey 0-11, C Carroll 2-1, K Enright 0-3, S Power 0-2, W Shanahan 0-2, P O'Halloran 0-1.	Caherconlish

8/27/17; 6:45 pm	Doon	1–17 – 0–17	Ballybrown	Childers Rd.
8/27/17; 6:45 pm	B Murphy 0-8, D O'Donovan 0-4, D Stapleton 1-0, P Ryan 0-3, D Coleman 0-1, C McNamara 0-1.		A O'Connor 0-10, M Sheehan 0-3, B Griffin 0-1, R Griffin 0-1, L Doolan 0-1, K Power 0-1.	Childers Rd.

=== Group 2 ===
==== Group 2 Table ====
Pos	Team	Pld	W	D	L	For	Ag.	Diff.	Pts.
1	Na Piarsaigh	5	4	0	1	160	82	78	8
2	Patrickswell	5	4	0	1	132	78	54	8
3	Adare	5	4	0	1	112	85	27	8
4	Monaleen	5	1	1	3	87	143	−56	3
5	Cappamore	5	1	0	4	76	116	−40	2
6	Knockainey	5	0	1	4	58	121	−63	1

==== Group 2 Round 1 ====
5 May 2017; 7:00pm	Knockainey	0–16 – 0–16	Monaleen	Fr. Hayes Memorial Park, Caherconlish; Referee: É Stapleton (Doon)
5 May 2017; 7:00pm	P Kirby 0–7, K Cleary 0–2, J O'Grady 0–2, J Lonergan 0–2, D Madden 0–1, N Finch 0–1, D Walsh 0–1.		M O'Dwyer 0–10, P Russell 0–2, G Collins 0–2, J Nicholas 0–2.	Fr. Hayes Memorial Park, Caherconlish; Referee: É Stapleton (Doon)

6 May 2017; 7:30pm	Na Piarsaigh	2–23 – 0–12	Cappamore	FitzGerald Park, Killmallock; Referee: M Sexton (Bruree)
6 May 2017; 7:30pm	S Dowling 0–8, A Breen 1–2, D Dempsey 1–2, J O'Brien 0–3, K Daly 0–2, K Ryan 0–2, G Brown 0–1, T Grimes 0–1, M Foley 0–1, K Downes 0–1.		T O'Donoghue 0–8, C Berkery 0–2, B Coffey 0–1, J Lonergan 0–1.	FitzGerald Park, Killmallock; Referee: M Sexton (Bruree)

7 May 2017; 4:45pm	Patrickswell	0–16 – 0–14	Adare	FitzGerald Park, Killmallock; Referee: D O'Callaghan (Feohanagh-Castlemahon)
7 May 2017; 4:45pm	A Gillane 0–6, A Carroll 0–5, B Foley 0–2, S O'Brien 0–1, K O'Brien 0–1, J Flynn 0–1.		W Griffin 0–8, B O'Connor 0–3, M Mackey 0–1, D O'Mahony 0–1, M Connolly 0–1.	FitzGerald Park, Killmallock; Referee: D O'Callaghan (Feohanagh-Castlemahon)

==== Group 2 Round 2 ====
13 May 2017; 7:15pm	Monaleen	3–16 – 1–14	Cappamore	Fr. Hayes Memorial Park, Caherconlish; Referee: J O'Halloran (Bruree)
13 May 2017; 7:15pm	M O'Dwyer 0–6, C Nicholas 1–2, A La Touche-Cosgrave 0–5, G Collins 1–1, J Nicholas 1–0, L Lyons 0–2.		T O'Donoghue 0–7, B Creamer 1–0, J Lonergan 0–2, C Sheehan 0–2, P O'Brien 0–1, C Berkery 0–1, A Coleman 0–1.	Fr. Hayes Memorial Park, Caherconlish; Referee: J O'Halloran (Bruree)

13 May 2017; 7:45pm	Na Piarsaigh	3–18 – 1–15	Patrickswell	Gaelic Grounds, Limerick; Referee: J Mullins (St. Kieran's)
13 May 2017; 7:45pm	S Dowling 0–10, A Breen 1–2, D Dempsey 1–0, K Ryan 1–0, P Casey 0–3, G Brown 0–1, M Foley 0–1, R Lynch 0–1.		A Gillane 0–6, L Considine 1–2, C Lynch 0–4, M Carmody 0–1, J Kelleher 0–1, K O'Brien 0–1.	Gaelic Grounds, Limerick; Referee: J Mullins (St. Kieran's)

14 May 2017; 3:00pm	Adare	0–15 – 1–07	Knockainey	FitzGerald Park, Killmallock; Referee: M Sexton (Bruree)
14 May 2017; 3:00pm	W Griffin 0–9, M Mackey 0–2, J Gahan 0–1, D O'Mahony 0–1, B O'Connor 0–1, J Fitzgibbon 0–1.		P Kirby 1–2, D Walsh 0–4, D Madden 0–1.	FitzGerald Park, Killmallock; Referee: M Sexton (Bruree)

==== Group 2 Round 3 ====
9 June 2017; 7:30pm	Na Piarsaigh	6–21 – 0–16	Monaleen	Childers Road, Limerick; Referee: M Sexton (Bruree)
9 June 2017; 7:30pm	D Dempsey 3–3, P Casey 1–7, K Downes 1–2, A Breen 1–2, R Lynch 0–4, A Dempsey 0–2, T Grimes 0–1.		A La Touche-Cosgrave 0–6, G Collins 0–4, J Nicholas 0–3, P Russell 0–3.	Childers Road, Limerick; Referee: M Sexton (Bruree)

10 June 2017; 7:30pm	Adare	1–17 – 1–16	Cappamore	Bruff Sportsfield, Bruff; Referee: J Murphy (Glenroe)
10 June 2017; 7:30pm	W Griffin 0–8, J Fitzgibbon 1–3, D o'Mahony 0–2, D Hannon 0–1, M Mackey 0–1, A O'Connell 0–1, J Gahan 0–1.		T O'Donoghue 0–9, J Lonergan 1–1, A Coleman 0–2, E O'Donoghue 0–1, D Deere 0–1, B Creamer 0–1, J Ryan 0–1.	Bruff Sportsfield, Bruff; Referee: J Murphy (Glenroe)

11 June 2017; 7:30pm	Patrickswell	4–23 – 0–09	Knockainey	Bruff Sporstfield, Bruff; Referee: J Mullins (St. Kieran's)
11 June 2017; 7:30pm	K O'Brien 2–4, A Gillane 1–3, J Kelleher 0–6, T Breen 1–1, C Lynch 0–3, D Byrnes 0–2, A Carroll 0–2, B Foley 0–2.		D Walsh 0–3, K Cleary 0–3, P Barron 0–2, J O'Grady 0–1.	Bruff Sporstfield, Bruff; Referee: J Mullins (St. Kieran's)

==== Group 2 Round 4 ====
29 July 2017; 7:00pm	Adare	3–17 – 2–19	Na Piarsaigh	Páirc na nGael, Askeaton; Referee: J Mullins (St. Kieran's)
29 July 2017; 7:00pm	W Griffin 1–7, L O'Brien 1–1, B O'Connor 0–4, M Mackey 1–0, M Connolly 0–1, R Connolly 0–1, D O'Mahony 0–1.		P Casey 1–9, K Daly 1–0, R Lynch 0–3, A Dempsey 0–3, C Boylan 0–1, C Houlihan 0–1, S Dowling 0–1, T Grimes 0–1.	Páirc na nGael, Askeaton; Referee: J Mullins (St. Kieran's)

30 July 2017; 5:30 pm	Patrickswell	3–25 – 0–15	Monaleen	Gaelic Grounds
30 July 2017; 5:30 pm	A Gillane 0–9, L Considine 1–3, K O'Brien 0–6, B Foley 1–1, T O'Brien 1–0, M Carmody 0–2, J Kelleher 0–1, D Byrnes 0–1, C Lynch 0–1, J Dillon 0–1.		M O'Dwyer 0–7, G Collins 0–3, L Lyons 0–2, P Russell 0–1, A Nicholas 0–1, C Nicholas 0–1.	Gaelic Grounds

30 July 2017; 7 pm	Cappamore	0–15 – 0–13	Knockainey	Childers Road
30 July 2017; 7 pm	T O'Donoghue 0–9, C Berkery 0–3, P O'Brien 0–1, B Creamer 0–1.		P Kirby 0–4, D Walsh 0–4, J O'Grady 0–2, D Madden 0–1, M Cleary 0–1, P Barron 0–1.	Childers Road

==== Group 2 Round 5 ====
8/26/17; 6:30 pm	Adare	3–28 – 2–9	Monaleen	Ballybrown
8/26/17; 6:30 pm	W Griffin 0-13, M Mackey 1-2, J Fitzgibbon 0-6, R Connolly 1-1, N Mulvihill 1-0, M Connolly 0-2, B O'Connor 0-1, D Hannon 0-1, J Hannon 0-1, L O'Brien 0-1.		P Russell 1-3, G Collins 0-4, B Geary 1-0, E Doyle 0-1, M O'Dwyer 0-1.	Ballybrown

8/26/17; 6:30 pm	Na Piarsaigh	6–22 – 0–10	Knockainey	Caherconlish
8/26/17; 6:30 pm	P Casey 2-5, C Boylan 2-2, D Dempsey 1-1, A Breen 1-1, S Dowling 0-5, M Foley 0-2, R Lynch 0-2, K Downes 0-2, A Dempsey 0-1, D Breen 0-1.		P Barron 0-5, D Walsh 0-4, M Cleary 0-1.	Caherconlish

8/26/17; 6:30 pm	Patrickswell	2–23 – 0–10	Cappamore	Bruff
8/26/17; 6:30 pm	A Gillane 2-8, B Foley 0-4, A Carroll 0-4, D Byrnes 0-2, S O'Brien 0-2, K O'Brien 0-1, D Aherne 0-1, T O'Brien 0-1.		C Sheehan 1-2, C Berkery 0-4, T O'Donoghue 0-3, J Fitzgibbon 0-1, P O'Brien 0-1.	Bruff

== Knock-out Stage ==
The winners of the two groups go straight into the semi-finals. The second and third place teams compete in the two quarter finals.

== Quarter-finals ==
9/16/17; 6:00 pm	Patrickswell	0–18 – 1–15	Ballybrown	Gaelic Grounds; Man of the Match: Ross Griffin
9/16/17; 6:00 pm	Aaron Gillane 0–8 (0-6f), Diarmaid Byrnes 0–5 (2 '65), Kevin O'Brien 0–2, Mark Carmody, Andrew Carroll, Cian Lynch 0–1 each		Alan O'Connor 0–8 (0-6f), Mark Sheehan 1–1, Ross Griffin 0–2, Luke Doran, Stevie O'Reilly, Lee Doolan, Shane Kenny 0–1 each	Gaelic Grounds; Man of the Match: Ross Griffin

9/16/17; 7:45 pm	Doon	2–18 – 0–10	Adare	Gaelic Grounds; Man of the Match: Denis Moloney
9/16/17; 7:45 pm	Barry Murphy 0–10 (0-8f, 1 '65), Dean Coleman 1–2, Darragh Stapleton 1–0, Pat Ryan 0–3, Denis Moloney 0–2, Darragh O'Donovan 0–1		Willie Griffin 0–7 (0-6f), John Fitzgibbon (0-1f), Brendan O'Connor, Mikey Mackey 0–1 each	Gaelic Grounds; Man of the Match: Denis Moloney

9/23/17; 4:45 pm Replay	Patrickswell	0–17 – 0–13	Ballybrown	Gaelic Grounds; Man of the Match: Aaron Gillane
9/23/17; 4:45 pm Replay	Aaron Gillane 0–10 (0-6f), Kevin O'Brien 0–3, Diarmaid Byrnes, Barry Foley, Seanie O'Brien, Peter Harty 0–1 each		Alan O'Connor 0–9 (0-6f, 1 '65), Josh Adams, Richie Kenny, Mark Sheehan, Lee Doolan 0–1 each	Gaelic Grounds; Man of the Match: Aaron Gillane

== Semi-finals ==
9/23/17; 3:00 pm	Na Piarsaigh	2–18 – 2–14	Doon	Gaelic Grounds; Referee: Donnacha O'Callaghan (Feohanagh); Man of the Match: Shane Dowling
9/23/17; 3:00 pm	Shane Dowling 0–7 (0-6f), Peter Casey 1–2, Kevin Downes 1–1, David Dempsey 0–3, William O'Donoghue 0–2, Tommy Grimes, Alan Dempsey, Adrian Breen 0–1 each		Barry Murphy 0–12 (0-10f), Darragh O'Donovan 1–1, Denis Moloney 1–0, Josh Ryan 0–1	Gaelic Grounds; Referee: Donnacha O'Callaghan (Feohanagh); Man of the Match: Shane Dowling

9/30/17; 5:00 pm	Kilmallock	1–18 – 0–13	Patrickswell	Gaelic Grounds; Referee: Jason Mullins (St. Kierans); Man of the Match: Jake Mulcahy
9/30/17; 5:00 pm	Eoin Ryan 0–11 (0-7f, 2 '65), Michael Houlihan 1–0, Jake Mulcahy, Kevin O'Donnell, Graeme Mulcahy 0–2 each, Paddy O'Looughlin 0–1		Aaron Gillane 0–6 (0-5f), Diarmaid Byrnes 0–2 (0-1f), Jack Kelleher, Barry Foley, Lar Considine, Kevin O'Brien, Peter Harty 0–1 each	Gaelic Grounds; Referee: Jason Mullins (St. Kierans); Man of the Match: Jake Mulcahy

== Final ==
15 October 2017; 3:30 pm	Na Piarsaigh	1–22 – 2–14	Kilmallock	Gaelic Grounds; Referee: Donnacha O’Callaghan (Feohanagh); Man of the Match: Adrian Breen
15 October 2017; 3:30 pm	Adrian Breen 0–6, Shane Dowling 0-5f, David Dempsey 1–2, Kevin Downes 0–3, Ronan Lynch 0–2 (0-1f), Tommy Grimes, Alan Dempsey, David Breen, Peter Casey 0–1 each	Report	Graeme Mulcahy 1–4, Jake Mulcahy 1–1, Kevin O'Donnell 0–3, Eoin Ryan 0-2f, Paudie O'Brien, Gavin O'Mahony, Michael Houlihan, Robbie Hanley 0–1 each	Gaelic Grounds; Referee: Donnacha O’Callaghan (Feohanagh); Man of the Match: Adrian Breen
