= Aaron Gillane =

Irish hurler

Personal information
- Native name: Aron Ó Giolláin (Irish)
- Born: 1996 (age 29–30) Patrickswell, County Limerick, Ireland
- Occupation: Sales rep
- Height: 6 ft 0 in (183 cm)

Sport
- Sport: Hurling
- Position: Right corner-forward
Club*
Years	Club	Apps (scores)
2014–present	Patrickswell	66 (22–383)
Club titles
- Limerick titles: 2
College
Years	College	Apps (scores)
2017–present	Mary Immaculate College	9 (7–80)
College titles
- Fitzgibbon titles: 1
Inter-county**
Years	County	Apps (scores)
2017–present	Limerick	52 (20–328)
Inter-county titles
- Munster titles: 7
- All-Irelands: 6
- NHL: 4
- All Stars: 4
- * club appearances and scores correct as of 22:48, 2 April 2026. **Inter County team apps and scores correct as of 22:16, 19 July 2026.

Aaron Gillane (born 1996) is an Irish hurler who plays as a right corner-forward for club side Patrickswell and at inter-county level with the Limerick senior hurling team.

== Early career ==
=== Ardscoil Rís ===
Gillane first came to prominence in Ardscoil Rís in Limerick. On 22 February 2014, he was introduced as a substitute when Arscoil Rís defeated Scoil na Trionóide from Doon by 2–13 to 0–04 in the final of the Harty Cup.

=== Mary Immaculate College ===
During his studies at Mary Immaculate College, Gillane was selected as a forward for the college's senior hurling team. On 25 February 2017, he won a Fitzgibbon Cup medal as Mary I retained the title after a 3–24 to 1–19 defeat of Carlow Institute of Technology in the final.

== Club career ==
Gillane joined the Patrickswell club at a young age and played in all grades at juvenile and underage levels. After an unremarkable period in these grades, he was 17-years-old when he joined the club's junior team after failing to make the cut with the senior panel. A combination of not being "good enough" and the prospect of soccer success could have resulted in Gillane walking away from the game but for the intervention of club legend Ciarán Carey who coaxed him onto the senior team. Gillane was in the early stages of his senior club career when Patrickswell suffered a one-point defeat by Na Piarsaigh in the 2015 county final.

Throughout the 2016 Limerick County Championship, Gillane further established himself as a key member of the starting fifteen by sharing the free-taking duties with Diarmaid Byrnes. On 23 October 2016, he scored seven points, including five frees, from right corner-forward when Patrickswell claimed their first championship in 13 years after a 19-point win over Ballybrown.

Gillane lined out in a second county final on 6 October 2019. Playing at right corner-forward he scored six points and collected a second winners' medal following the 1–17 to 0–15 defeat of Na Piarsaigh.

== Inter-county career ==
=== Minor and under-21 ===
Gillane first played for Limerick when he was added to the minor panel shortly before the start of the 2014 Munster Minor Championship. He made his first appearance for the team on 26 June 2014 when he was a late substitute for Séamus Flanagan in a two-point win over Cork in the Munster semi-final. Gillane was again confined to the substitutes' bench for the subsequent Munster final replay defeat by Waterford. By the time Limerick qualified for the All-Ireland final against Kilkenny, Gillane was overlooked by the management and did not make the 24-man match-day panel.

After a season of no underage inter-county activity, Gillane made his debut with the Limerick under-21 team on 28 June 2016 when he lined out at right corner-forward in a Munster quarter-final win over Cork. He was dropped from the starting fifteen for the semi-final defeat by Tipperary. In his second and final season with the under-21 team, Gillane secured a starting fifteen berth as well as taking over the free-taking duties. He ended the 2017 Munster Under-21 Championship as top scorer with 0–29, while he also claimed a winners' medal after Limerick's defeat of Cork in the final. On 9 September 2017, Gillane top scored with seven points in Limerick's 0–17 to 0–11 defeat of Kilkenny in the All-Ireland final. As well as ending the campaign as the championship's overall top scorer with 0–44, he was later named on the Bord Gáis Energy Team of the Year.

=== Senior ===
==== 2017 season ====
Gillane was in his final season with the Limerick under-21 team when he was drafted onto the senior panel by new manager John Kiely in advance of the 2017 Munster League. He made his only appearance of the pre-season competition on 8 January 2017 when he came on as a 54th-minute substitute for full-forward Seán Tobin in a first-round defeat of Waterford. Gillane was cut from the panel for the 2017 National League campaign, however, his impressive form for Mary Immaculate College in the Fitzgibbon Cup saw him earn a recall to the panel in advance of the 2017 Munster Championship. On 4 June 2017, he made his championship debut when he came on as a 57th-minute substitute for Shane Dowling in a 3–17 to 2–16 defeat by Clare in the Munster semi-final.

==== 2018 season ====
In November 2017, Gillane was again named on the 38-man Limerick panel for the upcoming 2018 season. He claimed his first silverware at senior level on 14 January 2018 when Limerick beat Clare by 0–16 to 0–10 to claim the 2018 Munster League title. Gillane started all of Limerick's games and ended the provincial league as top scorer with 1–21. The subsequent National League saw him start in all seven of Limerick's games, ending the campaign as the team's top scorers with 5–57. On 2 June 2018, Gillane was red carded and received a one-match suspension for digging twice at Cork's Seán O'Donoghue in their Munster Championship Round 3 game. The decision was described as a "joke" by team manager John Kiely. On 19 August 2018, Gillane was named at right corner-forward when Limerick faced Galway in the All-Ireland final. He scored three points in total, including one from a free, as Limerick won their first All-Ireland Championship title in 45 years after a 3–16 to 2–18 win. Gillane was later named the GAA/GPA Player of the Month for August, before ending the season by being nominated for an All-Star Award.

==== 2019 season ====
Gillane was again a regular for Limerick during the 2019 National League, starting in six of their eight games. He top scored with 1-09 from right corner-forward when Limerick claimed their first Division 1 title since 1997 after a 1–24 to 0–19 win over Waterford in the final His man of the match performance in the final also earned him a second GAA/GPA Player of the Month award. Gillane ended the 2019 Munster Championship as top scorer with 2–41, while he also claimed his first provincial winners' medal after the 2–26 to 2–14 win over Tipperary in the Munster final. He ended the year by receiving his second All-Star nomination and his first win.

==== 2020 season ====
Gillane wasn't included on the Limerick team for the two group stage games of the 2020 Munster League, with David Reidy taking over the free-taking duties. He was back on the team at right corner-forward for the final against Cork on 11 January 2020, and scored 1–01 from play in the 1–32 to 0–20 win. The subsequent National League campaign saw Gillane score 1–28 after lining out in four of Limerick's five Division 1A games. On 25 October 2020, he top-scored with 0–12 in a 0–36 to 1–23 defeat of Clare in the delayed league final. Gillane ended the 2020 Munster Championship as top scorer with 2–28, while he also claimed a second successive winners' medal after scoring ten points in the Munster final defeat of Waterford. On 29 November 2020, Gillane was hospitalised overnight following a heavy collision with Galway centre-back Gearóid McInerney in the All-Ireland semi-final. Limerick selector Donal O'Grady later cast doubt on his ability to recover in time for the All-Ireland final: "Aaron didn't train on Tuesday, obviously he took a heavy hit there at the weekend. We are hoping to possibly get him reassessed on Friday night, to see how he is. At the moment, 50–50 is my understanding as of today." Gillane made sufficient progress in his recovery and was named at right corner-forward for the All-Ireland final against Waterford on 13 December 2020. He top-scored for Limerick with ten points, including six frees, in the 0–30 to 0–19 win.

== Career statistics ==
=== Club ===
As of 13 September 2025.

Team	Season	Limerick		Munster		All-Ireland		Total	
Team	Season	Apps	Score	Apps	Score	Apps	Score	Apps	Score
Patrickswell	2014	2	0–02	—		—		2	0–02
Patrickswell	2015	4	0–06	—		—		4	0–06
Patrickswell	2016	8	3–42	`1	0-06	—		9	3–48
Patrickswell	2017	8	3–56	—		—		8	3–56
Patrickswell	2018	7	3–43	—		—		7	3–43
Patrickswell	2019	6	0–39	1	0-05	—		7	0–44
Patrickswell	2020	3	3–18	—		—		3	3–18
Patrickswell	2021	5	2–33	—		—		5	2–33
Patrickswell	2022	6	1–31	—		—		6	1–31
Patrickswell	2023	8	7–52	—		—		8	7–52
Patrickswell	2024	5	0–33	—		—		5	0–33
Patrickswell	2025	2	0–17	—		—		2	0–17
Career total		64	22–372	2	0–11	—		66	22–383

=== Inter-county ===
As of 19 July 2026.

Team	Year	National League			Munster		All-Ireland		Total	
Team	Year	Division	Apps	Score	Apps	Score	Apps	Score	Apps	Score
Limerick	2017	Division 1B	0	0-00	1	0-00	0	0-00	1	0-00
Limerick	2018	Division 1B	7	5–57	3	0–10	4	1–27	14	6–94
Limerick	2019	Division 1A	6	2–45	5	2–41	1	1-09	12	5–95
Limerick	2020	Division 1A	5	1–40	3	2–28	2	0–16	10	3–84
Limerick	2021	Division 1A	4	0–34	2	0–11	2	2–11	8	2–56
Limerick	2022	Division 1A	5	1–30	4	3–32	2	0–15	11	4–77
Limerick	2023	Division 1A	4	2–20	5	1–31	2	2–11	11	5–68
	2024		3	1–15	5	2–32	1	0–10	9	3–57
	2025		4	0–22	4	2-32	1	0-09	9	2–63
	2026		6	3-16	3	2-00	2	0-03	11	5-19
Total			44	15–278	35	14–217	17	6–111	96	34–613

== Honours ==
Ardscoil Rís

- Dr. Harty Cup: 2014

Mary Immaculate College

- Fitzgibbon Cup: 2017

Patrickswell

- Limerick Senior Hurling Championship: 2016, 2019

Limerick

- All-Ireland Senior Hurling Championship: 2018, 2020, 2021, 2022, 2023
- Munster Senior Hurling Championship: 2019, 2020, 2021, 2022, 2023, 2024
- National Hurling League: 2019, 2020, 2023, 2026
- Munster Senior Hurling League: 2018, 2020
- All-Ireland Under-21 Hurling Championship: 2017
- Munster Under-21 Hurling Championship: 2017
- Munster Minor Hurling Championship: 2014

=== Individual ===
Awards

- All-Star Award (4): 2019, 2020, 2022, 2023
- GAA-GPA All-Star Hurler of the Year (1): 2023
- The Sunday Game Team of the Year: 2019, 2020, 2021, 2022, 2023

Awards
Preceded by Stephen Bennett	All-Ireland Under-21 Hurling Championship; Player of the Year; 2017	Succeeded by Incumbent
