= 2022 Munster Hurling Cup =

Hurling competition in Munster, Ireland

Tournament details
- Province: Munster
- Year: 2022
- Sponsor: Co-Op Superstores
- Date: 8–23 January 2022
- Teams: 5
- Defending champions: Limerick

Winners
- Champions: Limerick (3rd win)
- Manager: John Kiely
- Captain: Barry Nash

Runners-up
- Runners-up: Clare
- Manager: Brian Lohan

Other
- Matches played: 4

The 2022 Munster Hurling Cup, also called the Co-Op Superstores Munster Hurling Cup, was an inter-county hurling competition in the province of Munster. Five of the six county teams of Munster competed; Cork did not compete. The competition was originally cancelled as part of fixture rescheduling, but was reinstated in November 2021. The draw took place on 8 December 2021, and the tournament took place in January 2022. It was renamed the "Munster Hurling Cup" as it was no longer a league system.

Kerry achieved a shock victory over Tipperary in the quarter-final, the first time they had beaten them in senior hurling. The Munster Hurling Cup was won by Limerick.

== Competition format ==
The competition is a straight knockout. Drawn games go to a penalty shoot-out without the playing of extra-time.

== Fixtures and results ==
8 January 2022 Quarter-final	Kerry	0-17 (17) – (14) 0-14	Tipperary	Tralee
14:00 GMT (UTC±0)		(HT: 0-9 – 0-6)		Venue: Austin Stack Park
		Report		Referee: Ciaran O’Regan (Cork)

15 January 2022 Semi-final	Clare	2-24 (30) – (25) 1-22	Waterford	Ennis
14:00 GMT (UTC±0)		(HT: 1-10 – 0-10)		Venue: Cusack Park
		Report		Referee: Michael Kennedy (Tipperary)

16 January 2022 Semi-final	Limerick	4-29 (41) – (11) 0-11	Kerry	Limerick
14:00 GMT (UTC±0)		(HT: 1-17 – 0-05)		Venue: TUS Gaelic Grounds
		Report		Referee: Niall Malone (Clare)

=== Final ===
23 January 2022
14:00 GMT (UTC±0)
Final

Report

Clare	0-18 (18) – (27) 0-27	Limerick
(HT: 0-09 – 0-17)

Cusack Park, Ennis
Referee: Conor Doyle (Tipperary)
Attendance: 7,992

== League statistics ==
=== Top scorers ===
Top scorers overall

Rank	Player	Club	Tally	Total	Matches	Average
1	David Reidy	Limerick	1-28	31	2	15.5
2	David Reidy	Clare	0-18	18	2	9
3	Shane Conway	Kerry	0-11	11	2	5.5
4	Pat Ryan	Limerick	2-4	10	2	10
5	Patrick Curran	Waterford	0-9	9	1	9
6	Austin Gleeson	Waterford	1-4	7	1	7
6	Sean Ryan	Tipperary	0-7	7	1	7
8	Shane Meehan	Clare	1-3	6	2	3
8	Mark Rodgers	Clare	1-3	6	2	3
8	Adam English	Limerick	1-3	6	2	3
11	Cathal O'Neill	Limerick	0-5	4	2	2.5
11	Brian O'Grady	Limerick	0-5	4	2	2.5

Top scorers in a single game
