= Séamus Flanagan =

Irish hurler

Personal information
- Native name: Séamus Ó Flanagáin (Irish)
- Nickname: Sham
- Born: 3 July 1997 (age 29) Feohanagh, County Limerick, Ireland
- Occupation: Sourcing manager
- Height: 6 ft 3 in (191 cm)

Sport
- Sport: Hurling
- Position: Full-forward
Club
- Years: Club
- Feohanagh-Castlemahon
Club titles
- Limerick titles: 0
College
- Years: College
- University College Dublin
College titles
- Fitzgibbon titles: 0
Inter-county*
Years	County	Apps (scores)
2017-present	Limerick	40 (9-59)
Inter-county titles
- Munster titles: 5
- All-Irelands: 5
- NHL: 3
- All Stars: 1
- *Inter County team apps and scores correct as of 17:56, 29 April 2026.

Séamus Flanagan (born 3 July 1997) is an Irish hurler who plays as a full-forward for club side Feohanagh-Castlemahon and at inter-county level with the Limerick senior hurling team.

== Club career ==
Flanagan joined the Feohanagh-Castlemahon club at a young age and played in all grades at juvenile and underage levels before eventually joining the club's top adult team. His father, John Flanagan, had also played for the club and was an All-Ireland runner-up with Limerick in 1980. His cousin, Paul Flanagan, won an All-Ireland medal with the Clare senior hurling team in 2013.

== Inter-county career ==
=== Minor and under-21 ===
Flanagan first played for Limerick when he was added to the minor panel shortly before the start of the 2014 Munster Minor Championship. He made his first appearance for the team on 10 April 2014 when he lined out at right wing-forward in a 3–17 to 2–11 win over Tipperary in the Munster quarter-final. Flanagan was switched to left wing-forward for the subsequent Munster final replay defeat by Waterford. On 7 September 2014, he scored two points from play in a 2–17 to 0–19 defeat by Kilkenny in the All-Ireland final. Eligible for the minor grade again the following year, he was selected at full-forward when Limerick suffered defeat by Tipperary in the 2015 Munster final.

After the end of his minor career, Flanagan was immediately added to the Limerick under-21 panel for the 2016 Munster Under-21 Championship. He made his first appearance for the team on 14 July 2016 in a two-point defeat by Tipperary in the Munster semi-final. Flanagan was again called up to the squad for the 2017 championship season, however, he found it difficult to break onto the team as either a member of the starting fifteen or as a substitute. He ended the 2017 Munster Under-21 Championship campaign with a winners' medal as a non-playing substitute after Limerick's 0–16 to 1–11 defeat of Cork in the final. On 9 September 2017, Flanagan was again confined to the substitutes' bench lined for Limerick's 0–17 to 0–11 defeat of Kilkenny in the All-Ireland final. For the third successive season in 2018, he earned inclusion on the under-21 panel. Flanagan made his last under-21 appearance on 21 June 2018 in a Munster semi-final defeat by Tipperary.

=== Senior ===
==== 2018 season ====
In November 2017, Flanagan was entering his final year with the Limerick under-21 team when he was named on the 38-man senior panel for the upcoming 2018 season. He made his competitive debut on 30 December 2017 and scored 1-02 from play the 2–23 to 1–21 defeat of Cork in the first round of the 2019 Munster League. Flanagan ended the pre-season league as the third highest scorer with 3-05, while he also collected his first silverware at senior level when Limerick defeated Clare by 0–16 to 0–10 to secure the provincial league title. On 28 January 2018, Flanagan made his National League debut when he lined out at full-forward in a 10-point first-round defeat of Laois. He was a regular for Limerick during the league, lining out in seven of their games, including the semi-final defeat by Tipperary. On 20 May 2018, Flanagan made his first championship appearance and scored a point from play in a 1–23 to 2–14 win over Tipperary in the Munster Championship. He established himself as Limerick's first-choice full-forward throughout the championship and was selected in that position when Limerick faced Galway in the 2018 All-Ireland final. He was held scoreless and substituted by Peter Casey as Limerick won their first All-Ireland Championship title in 45 years after a 3–16 to 2–18 win. Flanagan ended the season by being nominated for an All-Star Award.

==== 2019 season ====
Flanagan was again an integral part of the Limerick senior team during the early stages of the 2019 season, making two appearances during Limerick's unsuccessful pre-season Munster League campaign. He was a regular match-day player during the 2019 National League, making seven appearances during their eight league games. On 31 March 2019, Flanagan was introduced as a 55th-minute substitute for Graeme Mulcahy when Limerick claimed their first Division 1 title since 1997 after a 1–24 to 0–19 win over Waterford in the final. Flanagan found it difficult to break onto the starting fifteen during the 2019 Munster Championship, making just one start and two substitute appearances during the four group stage games. On 30 June 2019, he came on as a 66th-minute substitute for Peter Casey in Limerick's 2–26 to 2–14 defeat of Tipperary in the Munster final.

==== 2020 season ====
Flanagan again found it difficult to break onto Limerick's starting fifteen, making just one appearance during their title-winning Munster League campaign. The subsequent National League campaign saw Flanagan line out in four of Limerick's five Division 1A games. On 25 October 2020, he was introduced as a substitute in Limerick's 0–36 to 1–23 defeat of Clare in the delayed league final. Flanagan made three appearances off the bench during the 2020 Munster Championship, ending the campaign with a second successive winners' medal after the defeat of Waterford in the Munster final. On 29 November 2020, he received his first start of the championship when he lined out at full-forward in the All-Ireland semi-final defeat of Galway. On 13 December 2020, Flanagan scored three points after starting at full-forward when Limerick defeated Waterford by 0–30 to 0–19 in the All-Ireland final.

==== 2026 season ====
In October 2025, Flanagan was informed by Limerick manager John Kiely that we would not be part of the Limerick panel for 2026.

== Personal life ==
Flanaghan is married to Laurie Carey since 2022 and they have four children. He works as a Sourcing Manager for Verizon having previously worked as a radiographer at University Hospital Limerick. Since 2025, he has been the manager of Boherlahan–Dualla and has also done media work for the BBC and RTE Sport.

== Career statistics ==
Team	Year	National League			Munster		All-Ireland		Total	
Team	Year	Division	Apps	Score	Apps	Score	Apps	Score	Apps	Score
Limerick	2018	Division 1B	7	0-11	4	0-09	4	0-03	15	0-23
Limerick	2019	Division 1B	6	2-06	4	0-00	0	0-00	10	2-06
Limerick	2020	Division 1A	5	0-09	3	1-03	2	0-05	10	1-17
Limerick	2021	Division 1A	4	1-10	2	1-05	2	0-05	8	2-20
Limerick	2022	Division 1A	3	0-03	3	0-08	2	0-04	8	0-15
Limerick	2023	Division 1A	7	0-08	5	4-07	2	0-02	14	4-17
Limerick	2024	Division 1A	5	0-02	3	3-03	1	0-01	9	3-06
Limerick	2025	Division 1A	4	0-00	2	0-02	0	0-00	6	0-02
Total			41	3-49	27	9-39	13	0-20	81	12-106

== Honours ==
Feohanagh/Castlemahon

- Limerick Junior A Hurling Championship (1): 2014

Limerick

- All-Ireland Senior Hurling Championship (5): 2018, 2020, 2021, 2022, 2023
- Munster Senior Hurling Championship (5): 2019, 2020, 2021, 2022, 2023
- National Hurling League (3): 2019, 2020, 2023
- All-Ireland Under-21 Hurling Championship (1): 2017
- Munster Under-21 Hurling Championship (1): 2017
- Munster Minor Hurling Championship (1): 2014

Awards

- All-Star Award (1): 2021
- The Sunday Game Team of the Year (1): 2021
