= Cian Lynch =

Irish hurler (born 1996)

Personal information
- Native name: Cian Ó Loingsigh (Irish)
- Born: 3 January 1996 (age 30) Patrickswell, County Limerick, Ireland
- Height: 1.8 m (5 ft 11 in)

Sport
- Sport: Hurling
- Position: Centre-forward
Club
- Years: Club
- 2013–present: Patrickswell
Club titles
- Limerick titles: 2
College(s)
- Years: College
- Mary Immaculate College; NUI Galway
College titles
- Fitzgibbon titles: 2
Inter-county*
Years	County	Apps (scores)
2015–present	Limerick	57 (1–70)
Inter-county titles
- Munster titles: 7
- All-Irelands: 6
- NHL: 4
- All Stars: 3
- *Inter County team apps and scores correct as of 21:58, 19 July 2026.

Cian Lynch (born 3 January 1996) is an Irish hurler who plays as a centre forward for Limerick Championship club Patrickswell, where he has held the role of captain, and the Limerick senior team. Recognised for his skill level and team play, he is widely considered one of the best players in the current game and has often been described as a "midfield magician". He is also one of only two players to win the 'hurler of the year' award more than once, with the only other player to do so being Henry Shefflin with three wins.

Lynch began his inter-county career at minor level with Limerick in 2012, with whom he won back-to-back Munster Minor Championship titles in his last two years with the team. In 2014, he joined the Limerick under-21 team and was integral in the team's All-Ireland Under-21 Championship wins in 2015 and 2017. Lynch joined the Limerick senior team for the 2015 season. He has since won four All-Ireland Championship titles, three Munster Championship titles and two National Hurling League titles with the team. In 2020, he had a significant role in Limerick becoming the first team since Tipperary in 1961 to have a 100% winning record in all competitions in a single season.

Lynch made his senior club championship debut with Patrickswell as a 17-year-old in 2013 and has since established himself as one of the mainstays of the team. He was a member of the Patrickswell team that won County Championship titles in 2016 and 2019.

Lynch has been named on the GAA–GPA All-Star Team and the Sunday Game Team of the Year three times each and the Under-21 Team of the Year twice. He was also named GAA–GPA Player of the Month in his first championship season and was GAA–GPA All-Star Hurler of the Year in 2018 and 2021.

== Early career ==
=== Ardscoil Rís ===
Lynch first came to prominence as a hurler with Ardscoil Rís in Limerick. Having played in every grade, he was just 15-years-old when he earned selection for the college's senior hurling team. On 27 February 2011, Lynch was introduced as a substitute when Ardscoil Rís won the Harty Cup title after a 3–19 to 0–03 defeat of C.B.S. Charleville in the final. He was also introduced as a substitute in the subsequent 2–10 to 1–11 defeat by St. Kieran's College in the All-Ireland final. On 22 February 2014, Lynch was captain of the Ardscoil Rís that defeated Scoil na Trionóide from Doon by 2–13 to 0–04 in the final of the Harty Cup.

=== Mary Immaculate College ===
During his studies at Mary Immaculate College, Lynch was selected as a forward for the college's senior hurling team. On 27 February 2016, he won a Fitzgibbon Cup medal as Mary I won their first ever title after a 1–30 to 3–22 defeat of the University of Limerick. Lynch was at full-forward when Mary I retained the title in 2017 following a 3–24 to 1–19 defeat of Carlow Institute of Technology.

== Club career ==
Lynch joined Patrickswell at a young age, a club with whom his family had a long tradition. His six uncles, Ciarán, Paul, Pa, Seán and Nigel Carey, were senior team mainstays during a golden era for the club in the 1980s and 1990s. After an unremarkable juvenile and underage career, Lynch was 17-years-old when he joined the club's senior team, stating: "I was in fifth year at school and was with the county minors. It was my second last year minor so I was only coming and going so I didn't play that much that year. I was kind of concentrating on the minor and my own age group."

An undefeated run through the 2015 County Championship campaign saw Patrickswell qualify for the final, with Lynch's side ultimately facing a one-point defeat by Na Piarsaigh. For the second successive season, Patrickswell remained undefeated on their way to the 2016 County Championship final. Lynch scored three points from play and ended the game with his first winners' medal after a 1–26 to 1–07 win over Ballybrown.

After two unsuccessful seasons, Lynch was appointed team captain in advance of the 2019 County Championship. After a third undefeated run through the group stage in five years, Patrickswell qualified for the 2019 final. Lynch ended the game with a second winners' medal after scoring three points in the 1–17 to 0–15 defeat of Na Piarsaigh.

== Inter-county career ==
=== Minor and under-21 ===
Lynch was just 16-years-old when he was added to the Limerick minor panel shortly before the start of the 2012 Munster Minor Championship. On 2 May 2012, he made his first appearance for the team, scoring a point from left corner-forward in a 0–16 to 1–12 quarter-final defeat of Cork. Once again eligible for the minor grade in 2013, Lynch was retained on the team by manager Brian Ryan. On 23 July 2013, he lined out at wing-forward when Limerick won their first Munster Minor Championship title in 29 years after a 1–20 to 4–08 defeat of Waterford in a replay of the final. Lynch was appointed captain of the Limerick minor team in advance of the 2014 Munster Minor Championship. On 22 July 2014, he won a second successive Munster Minor Championship title after a six-point win over Waterford in a final replay. On 7 September 2014, Lynch captained Limerick to a 2–17 to 0–19 defeat by Kilkenny in the All-Ireland final.

Lynch was in his final year with the minor team when he was drafted onto the Limerick under-21 team for the 2014 Munster Under-21 Championship. On 4 June 2014, he made his first appearance for the team in a 2–20 to 1–14 quarter-final defeat by Clare. Lynch was again called up to the under-21 panel for the 2015 Munster Under-21 Championship, becoming the only senior panellist on the team. On 30 July 2015, he lined out at left corner-forward when Limerick defeated four-in-a-row hopefuls Clare by 0–22 to 0–19 to win the Munster Under-21 Championship title. On 12 September 2015, Lynch was switched to centre-forward when Limerick defeated Wexford by 0–26 to 1–07 to win the All-Ireland Championship. He ended the season by being named in the centre-forward position on the Team of the Year.

After a defeat by Tipperary in 2016, Lynch lined out in a fourth successive Munster Under-21 Championship campaign the following year. On 26 July 2017, he won a second Munster Under-21 Championship title in three years after a 0–16 to 1–11 defeat of Cork in the Munster final. On 9 September 2017, Lynch was at left wing-forward for Limerick's 0–17 to 0–11 defeat of Kilkenny in the All-Ireland final. He was once again honoured at the end of the season by being included on the Team of the Year.

=== Senior ===
==== 2015 season ====
Lynch was just 19-years-old when he was drafted onto the Limerick senior panel by team manager T. J. Ryan in advance of the 2015 Waterford Crystal Cup. He made his first appearance for the team on 17 January 2015, scoring three points from left wing-forward in a 2–15 to 1–15 quarter-final win over Waterford. Lynch was a regular during the pre-season competition and ended the campaign by claiming his first senior silverware after a 3–20 to 1–16 defeat of Cork in the final. He was retained on the Limerick panel for the 2015 National League and lined out in all six of Limerick's games after making his debut on 14 February 2015 in a 2–16 to 0–22 draw with Waterford. On 24 May 2015, Lynch made his first appearance in the Munster Championship when he gave a man of the match performance in a one-point quarter-final win over Clare. He was later named as the GAA/GPA Player of the Month.

==== 2016 season ====
Lynch was again included on the Limerick panel for the 2016 season, but missed the team's two opening games in the newly created pre-season Munster League. On 23 January 2016, he scored two points from left wing-forward when Limerick were beaten by Clare in the final. Lynch was a regular starter in Limerick's 2016 National League campaign and made six appearances in total, including at left wing-forward in the 3–23 to 1–18 semi-final defeat by Waterford.

==== 2017 season ====
Lynch combined his Mary Immaculate College Fitzgibbon Cup duties with Limerick's Munster League campaign at the start of the 2017 season. On 29 January 2017, he came on as a 60th-minute substitute for team captain James Ryan in a 1–21 to 1–20 provincial league final defeat by Cork. Lynch made five appearances for Limerick during the 2017 National League campaign, including at left corner-forward in the ten-point defeat by Galway in the semi-final.

==== 2018 season ====
Lynch was again named on the 38-man Limerick panel for the upcoming 2018 season, however, he missed some part of the pre-season Munster League due to Fitzgibbon Cup commitments with Mary Immaculate College. On 14 January 2018, he claimed his first senior silverware in three years when Limerick beat Clare by 0–16 to 0–10 to claim the pre-season tournament title. The subsequent National League saw Lynch line out in all seven of Limerick's games. On 19 August 2018, he was named at right corner-forward when Limerick faced Galway in the All-Ireland final. Lynch scored a point from play as Limerick won their first All-Ireland Championship title in 45 years after a 3–16 to 2–18 win. Later that day he was named on the Sunday Game Team of the Year. Lynch ended the season by being named Hurler of the Year, while he also selected as midfield partner to Cork's Darragh Fitzgibbon on the All-Star Team.

==== 2019 season ====
Lynch was again a regular for Limerick during the 2019 National League, playing a role in seven of their eight games. He scored two points from play when Limerick claimed their first Division 1 title since 1997 after a 1–24 to 0–19 win over Waterford in the final. Lynch ended the 2019 Munster Championship with his first provincial winners' medal after the 2–26 to 2–14 win over Tipperary in the Munster final. He ended the year by receiving his second successive All-Star nomination.

==== 2020 season ====
Lynch wasn't included on the Limerick team for the two group stage games of the 2020 Munster League. He was back on the team at midfield for the final against Cork on 11 January 2020, and scored a point from play in the 1–32 to 0–20 win. The subsequent National League campaign saw Lynch lining out in three of Limerick's five Division 1A games. On 25 October 2020, he was again at midfield for the 0–36 to 1–23 defeat of Clare in the delayed league final. Lynch ended the 2020 Munster Championship with a second successive winners' medal after lining out in the new position of centre-forward in the Munster final defeat of Waterford. He was again selected at centre-forward for the All-Ireland final against Waterford on 13 December 2020, ending the game with a second title in three years after the 0–30 to 0–19 win.

==== 2021 season ====
Lynch was named on the bench for Limerick's opening group stage game of the 2021 National League against Tipperary. After coming on as a substitute in the 0–20 apiece draw, he was restored to the starting fifteen for Limerick's next three games against Galway, Waterford and Cork, before dropping to the subs' bench for Limerick's final group stage game against Westmeath. After the team came in for criticism for a poor league start, Lynch stated: "It’s just about staying focused really and working hard every week, every game that comes your way. Just doing your best as a group and team. It’s just about driving on and we’re looking forward to the summer now." Lynch subsequently claimed a third successive Munster Championship title as well as being named man of the match for his Munster final performance against Tipperary. He was again named man of the match after claiming a third All-Ireland winners' medal in four seasons following the All-Ireland final defeat of Cork. Lynch was subsequently named GAA/GPA Player of the Month for the second time in his career.

== Career statistics ==
As of match played 19 July 2026

Team	Year	National League			Munster		All-Ireland		Total	
Team	Year	Division	Apps	Score	Apps	Score	Apps	Score	Apps	Score
Limerick	2015	Division 1B	6	0-07	2	0-03	2	0-00	10	0–10
Limerick	2016	Division 1B	6	0-02	1	0-01	1	0-01	8	0-04
Limerick	2017	Division 1B	5	1-05	1	0-02	1	0-00	7	1-07
Limerick	2018	Division 1B	7	0-07	4	0-09	4	1-03	15	1–19
Limerick	2019	Division 1A	6	0-04	5	0-04	1	0-00	12	0-08
Limerick	2020	Division 1A	4	0-03	3	0-05	2	0-02	9	0–10
Limerick	2021	Division 1A	4	0-05	2	0-04	2	0-09	8	0–18
Limerick	2022	Division 1A	3	1-01	2	0-02	1	0-00	6	1-03
Limerick	2023	Division 1A	5	0-06	4	0-01	2	0-03	11	0–10
Limerick	2024	Division 1A	3	0-02	5	0-03	1	0-01	9	0-06
Limerick	2025	Division 1A	6	0-06	4	0-05	1	0-02	11	0–13
Limerick	2026	Division 1A	6	0-03	4	0-08	2	0-02	12	0-11
Career total			61	2–51	37	0–47	20	1–23	118	3–118

== Honours ==
=== Player ===
Patrickswell

- Limerick Senior Hurling Championship (2): 2016, 2019 (c)

Ardscoil Rís

- Dr. Harty Cup (2): 2011, 2014 (c)

Mary Immaculate College

- Fitzgibbon Cup (2): 2016, 2017

Limerick

- All-Ireland Senior Hurling Championship (6): 2018, 2020, 2021, 2022, 2023 (c), 2026
- Munster Senior Hurling Championship (7): 2019, 2020, 2021, 2022, 2023, 2024, 2026
- National Hurling League (4): 2019, 2020, 2023 (c), 2026 (c)
- Munster Senior Hurling League (2): 2018, 2020 (c)
- All-Ireland Under-21 Hurling Championship (2): 2015, 2017
- Munster Under-21 Hurling Championship (2): 2015, 2017
- Munster Minor Hurling Championship (2): 2013, 2014 (c)
- Waterford Crystal Cup (1): 2015

=== Individual ===
Awards

- All Stars Hurler of the Year (2): 2018, 2021
- All-Star Award (3): 2018, 2020, 2021
- The Sunday Game Hurler of the Year: 2021
- The Sunday Game Team of the Year (3): 2018, 2020, 2021
- All-Ireland Senior Hurling Championship Final Man of the Match: 2021
- GAA/GPA Player of the Month (1): May 2015

Sporting positions
Preceded by Richie English	Limerick minor hurling team captain 2014	Succeeded by Eoghan McNamara
Preceded by Declan Hannon	Limerick senior hurling team captain 2023	Succeeded by Incumbent
Achievements
Preceded by Declan Hannon	All-Ireland Senior Hurling Final winning captain 2023	Succeeded by Incumbent
Awards
Preceded by Joe Canning	GAA-GPA All-Star Hurler of the Year; 2018	Succeeded by Séamus Callanan
Preceded by Gearóid Hegarty	GAA-GPA All-Star Hurler of the Year; 2021	Succeeded by Diarmaid Byrnes
Preceded by Gearóid Hegarty	All-Ireland Senior Hurling Final; Man of the Match; 2021	Succeeded by Gearóid Hegarty
