= 2026 Munster Senior Hurling League =

Irish hurling competition

Tournament details
- Province: Munster
- Date: 3–17 January 2026
- Teams: 6
- Defending champions: Cork

Winners
- Champions: Limerick (4th win)
- Manager: John Kiely
- Captain: Cian Lynch

Runners-up
- Runners-up: Waterford
- Manager: Peter Queally
- Captain: Billy Nolan

Other
- Matches played: 7

The 2026 Munster Senior Hurling League was a hurling competition for county teams in the province of Munster.

The fixtures were announced in November 2025, with the competition commencing on 3 January. It was won by Limerick.

== Format ==
The teams are drawn into two groups of three teams. Each team plays the other teams in its group once, earning 2 points for a win and 1 for a draw. The two group winners play in the final.

== Results ==
=== Group A ===
| Pos | Team | Pld | W | D | L | PF | PA | PD | Pts | Qualification |
|---|---|---|---|---|---|---|---|---|---|---|
| 1 | Waterford | 2 | 1 | 1 | 0 | 64 | 27 | +37 | 3 | Advance to final |
| 2 | Tipperary | 2 | 1 | 1 | 0 | 40 | 31 | +9 | 3 | |
| 3 | Kerry | 2 | 0 | 0 | 2 | 16 | 62 | −46 | 0 | |

Source: Munster GAA

=== Group B ===
| Pos | Team | Pld | W | D | L | PF | PA | PD | Pts | Qualification |
|---|---|---|---|---|---|---|---|---|---|---|
| 1 | Limerick | 2 | 1 | 0 | 1 | 58 | 45 | +13 | 2 | Advance to final |
| 2 | Clare | 2 | 1 | 0 | 1 | 49 | 48 | +1 | 2 | |
| 3 | Cork | 2 | 1 | 0 | 1 | 37 | 51 | −14 | 2 | |

Source: Munster GAA

=== Final ===
| 17 January 2026 Final | Waterford | 0-15 (15) – (23) 0-23 | Limerick | Mallow |
| 15:15 IWT (UTC±0) | | (HT: 0-11 – 0-12) | | Venue: Mallow GAA Sports Complex |
| | | Report | | Referee: John Bugler (Clare); Attendance: 2,000; TV: TG4 |
