= 2023 Munster Senior Hurling League =

- Dates: 3–22 January 2023
- Teams: 6
- Sponsor: Co-Op Superstores
- Champions: Cork (2nd title); Seán O'Donoghue (captain); Pat Ryan (manager)
- Runners-up: Tipperary; Noel McGrath (captain); Liam Cahill (manager)

Tournament statistics
- Matches played: 7
- Goals scored: 15 (2.14 per match)
- Points scored: 270 (38.57 per match)
- Top scorer(s): Jason Forde (2-28)

The 2023 Munster Senior Hurling League, known for sponsorship reasons as the Co-Op Superstores Munster Hurling League, was an inter-county hurling competition in the province of Munster, played by all six county teams in January 2023. Cork were the winners, defeating Tipperary in the final.

== Format ==
The teams were drawn into two groups of three teams. Each team played the other teams in its group once, earning 2 points for a win and 1 for a draw. The two group winners played in the final.

== Group A ==
=== Group A table ===
| Pos | Team | Pld | W | D | L | PF | PA | PD | Pts | Qualification |
|---|---|---|---|---|---|---|---|---|---|---|
| 1 | Tipperary | 2 | 1 | 0 | 1 | 46 | 41 | +5 | 2 | Advance to final |
| 2 | Waterford | 2 | 1 | 0 | 1 | 46 | 45 | +1 | 2 | |
| 3 | Clare | 2 | 1 | 0 | 1 | 47 | 53 | −6 | 2 | |

Updated to match(es) played on 15 January 2023. Source: Munster GAA

=== Group A results ===
| 3 January 2023 Round 1 | Waterford | 0-21 - 1-15 | Tipperary | Mallow GAA Complex |
| | R Halloran 0-7 (6fs, 1 ’65); C Dunford, S Walsh and P Fitzgerald 0-2 each; C Daly, M Fitzgerald, I Daly, P Leavey, DJ Foran, B Nolan (f), B Power and A Gleeson 0-1 each. | Report | J Forde 1-11 (5fs, 1 ’65); C O’Dwyer 0-2; A Tynan and C Bowe 0-1 each. |

| 8 January 2023 Round 2 | Tipperary | 2-22 - 0-20 | Clare | MacDonagh Park |
| | G O’Connor 0-8 (6f, 1 65), J Forde 1-3 (1-1 pens), S Ryan 1-1, C Stakelum 0-2, B Hogan (f), E Heffernan, S Kennedy, A Tynan, J Morris, M Kehoe, C O’Dwyer, J Ryan 0-1 each. | Report | P Duggan 0-5 (3f, 1 pen), R Mounsey 0-4, D Conroy, M Rodgers, D Ryan 0-3 each, P Crotty, A McCarthy 0-1 each. | Attendance: 3,000 |

| 15 January 2023 Round 3 | Clare | 1-24 - 2-18 | Waterford | Cusack Park |
| | A McCarthy 0-10 (6 free, 2 65), M Rodgers 0-4, A Shanagher 1-1, K Smythe 0-2, P Donnellan 0-2, G O’Grady 0-1, D McInerney 0-1, D Ryan 0-1, D Fitzgerald 0-1, I Galvin 0-1. | Report | S Bennett 1-8 (1 pen, 6 free), M Kiely 1-3, P Curran 0-1, S McNulty 0-1, R Halloran 0-1, J Barron 0-1, P Fitzgerald 0-2, D Lyons 0-1, K Mahony 0-1. | Attendance: 2,254; Referee: S Stokes (Cork) |

== Group B ==
=== Group B table ===
| Pos | Team | Pld | W | D | L | PF | PA | PD | Pts | Qualification |
|---|---|---|---|---|---|---|---|---|---|---|
| 1 | Cork | 2 | 2 | 0 | 0 | 56 | 42 | +14 | 4 | Advance to final |
| 2 | Limerick | 2 | 1 | 0 | 1 | 44 | 29 | +15 | 2 | |
| 3 | Kerry | 2 | 0 | 0 | 2 | 32 | 61 | −29 | 0 | |

Updated to match(es) played on 22 January 2023. Source: Munster GAA

=== Group B results ===
| 5 January 2023 Round 1 | Kerry | 2-17 - 2-30 | Cork | Austin Stack Park |
| | P Boyle (2-7, 1-5 frees); J Conway, S Conway, K Carmody (0-2 each); F MacKessy, N Mulcahy, D Goggin, K O’Connor (0-1 each). | Report | D Dalton (1-7, 0-2 frees); S Kingston (0-6, 0-5 frees); S Barrett (1-3, 0-1 free); A Cadogan (0-4); C Lehane, C Beausang (0-3 each); T O’Connell, B Roche, C Walsh, B O’Sullivan (0-1 each). |

| 15 January 2023 Round 2 | Cork | 0-20 - 1-16 | Limerick | Páirc Uí Rinn |
| | C Lehane 0-12 (0-7 frees, 0-1 65), C Beausang, B Hayes 0-2 each, L Meade, S Barrett, C Cahalane, B O’Sullivan 0-1 each. | Report | D Reidy 0-9f, D O’Donovan 1-0, S O’Brien, A O’Connor 0-2 each, O O’Reilly, B Murphy, C O’Grady 0-1 each. | Attendance: 5,128; Referee: J Mullins (Clare) |

| 22 January 2023 Round 3 | Kerry | 0-09 - 0-25 | Limerick | Austin Stack Park |
| | S Conway 0-5 (0-5 frees), F Mackessy 0-2, E Ross 0-2 | | D Reidy 0-9 (0-7 frees), C Coughlin 0-4, M Quinlan 0-3, M Houlihan 0-2, C O'Grady 0-2, A Costelloe 0-1, R Connolly 0-1, B Murphy 0-1, D O'Connell 0-1, S O'Brien 0-1 |

== Knockout stage ==
=== Final ===
| 22 January 2023 Final | Tipperary | 1-19 - 3-14 | Cork | Páirc Uí Rinn |
| 15:00 IWT (UTC±0) | J Forde (0-14, 0-9 frees); S Ryan (1-0); B McGrath, C Stakelum, S Kennedy, C O’Dwyer, C Bowe (0-1 each). | Report | P Horgan (1-6, 0-6 frees); J O’Connor (1-1); B Hayes (1-0); P Collins (0-2 frees), B Roche (0-2 each); S Twomey, R O’Flynn, C Lehane (0-1 each). | Attendance: 4,727; Referee: É Stapleton (Limerick) |

== League statistics ==
=== Top scorers ===
Overall

| Rank | Player | Club | Tally | Total | Matches | Average |
|---|---|---|---|---|---|---|
| 1 | Jason Forde | Tipperary | 2-28 | 34 | 3 | 11.33 |
| 2 | David Reidy | Limerick | 0-18 | 18 | 2 | 9.00 |
| 3 | Conor Lehane | Cork | 0-16 | 16 | 3 | 5.33 |
| 4 | Pádraig Boyle | Kerry | 2-07 | 13 | 1 | 13.00 |
| 5 | Stephen Bennett | Waterford | 1-08 | 11 | 1 | 11.00 |
| 5 | Aidan McCarthy | Clare | 0-11 | 11 | 2 | 5.50 |
| 7 | Declan Dalton | Cork | 1-07 | 10 | 2 | 5.00 |
| 8 | Patrick Horgan | Cork | 1-06 | 9 | 2 | 4.50 |
| 9 | Gearóid O'Connor | Tipperary | 0-08 | 8 | 2 | 4.00 |
| 9 | Reuben Halloran | Waterford | 0-08 | 8 | 2 | 4.00 |

In a single game

| Rank | Player | Club | Tally | Total | Opposition |
|---|---|---|---|---|---|
| 1 | Jason Forde | Tipperary | 1-11 | 14 | Waterford |
| 1 | Jason Forde | Tipperary | 0-14 | 14 | Cork |
| 3 | Pádraig Boyle | Kerry | 2-07 | 13 | Cork |
| 4 | Conor Lehane | Cork | 0-12 | 12 | Limerick |
| 5 | Stephen Bennett | Waterford | 1-08 | 11 | Clare |
| 6 | Declan Dalton | Cork | 1-07 | 10 | Kerry |
| 6 | Aidan McCarthy | Clare | 0-10 | 10 | Waterford |
| 8 | Patrick Horgan | Cork | 1-06 | 9 | Tipperary |
| 8 | David Reidy | Limerick | 0-09 | 9 | Kerry |
| 8 | David Reidy | Limerick | 0-09 | 9 | Cork |
