= Darren O'Connell =

Irish hurler (born 1997)

Personal information
- Native name: Darrin Ó Conaill (Irish)
- Born: 1997 (age 28–29) Kildimo, County Limerick, Ireland
- Occupation: Quantity surveyor

Sport
- Sport: Hurling
- Position: Right corner-forward
Club
- Years: Club
- Kildimo-Pallaskenry
Club titles
- Limerick titles: 0
College
- Years: College
- 2016-2020: Limerick Institute of Technology
College titles
- Fitzgibbon titles: 0
Inter-county*
Years	County	Apps (scores)
2019-present	Limerick	0 (0-00)
Inter-county titles
- Munster titles: 1
- All-Irelands: 1
- NHL: 1
- All Stars: 0
- *Inter County team apps and scores correct as of 22:20, 22 December 2020.

Darren O'Connell (born 1997) is an Irish hurler who plays for Limerick Senior Championship club Kildimo/Pallaskenry and at inter-county level with the Limerick senior hurling team. He usually lines out as a right corner-forward.

== Career statistics ==
As of match played 27 February 2022.

Team	Year	National League			Munster		All-Ireland		Total	
Team	Year	Division	Apps	Score	Apps	Score	Apps	Score	Apps	Score
Limerick	2020	Division 1A	3	0-02	0	0-00	0	0-00	3	0-02
Limerick	2021		3	1-00	0	0-00	0	0-00	3	1-00
	2022		2	0-00	0	0-00	0	0-00	2	0-00
Career total			8	1-02	0	0-00	0	0-00	8	1-02

== Honours ==
Garryspillane

- Limerick Premier Intermediate Hurling Championship (1): 2020

Limerick

- All-Ireland Senior Hurling Championship (1): 2020
- Munster Senior Hurling Championship (1): 2020
- National Hurling League (1): 2020
- Munster Senior Hurling League (2): 2020
