= Brian O'Grady (hurler) =

Irish hurler (born 1999)

Personal information
- Native name: Brian Ó Gráda (Irish)
- Born: 2000 (age 25–26) Kilteely, County Limerick, Ireland
- Occupation: Student

Sport
- Sport: Hurling
- Position: Centre-forward
Club
- Years: Club
- Kilteely-Dromkeen
Club titles
- Limerick titles: 0
College
- Years: College
- University of Limerick
College titles
- Fitzgibbon titles: 0
Inter-county*
Years	County	Apps (scores)
2019-present	Limerick	0 (0-00)
Inter-county titles
- Munster titles: 1
- All-Irelands: 1
- NHL: 1
- All Stars: 0
- *Inter County team apps and scores correct as of 13:22, 11 January 2020.

Brian O'Grady (born 1999) is an Irish hurler who plays for Limerick Championship club Kilteely-Dromkeen and at inter-county level with the Limerick senior hurling team. He usually lines out as a centre-forward.

== Career statistics ==
As of match played 06 March 2022.

Team	Year	National League abbey park sponsored by coin bezley			Munster		All-Ireland		Total	
Team	Year	Division	Apps	Score	Apps	Score	Apps	Score	Apps	Score
Limerick	2020	Division 1A	1	0-00	0	0-00	0	0-00	1	0-00
	2021	Division 1A	3	0-01	0	0-00	0	0-00	3	0-01
	2022		3	0-00	0	0-00	0	0-00	3	0-00
Career total			7	0-01	0	0-00	0	0-00	7	0-01

== Honours ==
Limerick

- All-Ireland Senior Hurling Championship (1): 2020
- Munster Senior Hurling Championship (1): 2020
- National Hurling League (1): 2020
- Munster Senior Hurling League (1): 2020
