= 2019 Munster Senior Hurling League =

- Dates: 14 December 2018 – 13 January 2019
- Teams: 6
- Sponsor: Co-Op Superstores
- Champions: Clare (2nd title); Tony Kelly (captain); Donal Moloney and Gerry O'Connor (manager)
- Runners-up: Tipperary; Barry Hogan (captain); Liam Sheedy (manager)

Tournament statistics
- Matches played: 7
- Goals scored: 28 (4 per match)
- Points scored: 236 (33.71 per match)
- Top scorer(s): Stephen Bennett (2-25)

The 2019 Munster Senior Hurling League, known for sponsorship reasons as the Co-Op Superstores Munster Hurling League, is the fourth Munster Senior Hurling League, an annual hurling league competition for county teams from the province of Munster.

For the first time, all six county teams competed, with Tipperary making their debut. They reached the final where they lost to Clare.

== Competition format ==
The six teams are drawn into two groups of three teams. Each team plays the other teams in their group once, earning 2 points for a win and 1 for a draw. The two group winners advance to the final.

== Group A ==
=== Table ===
Pos	Team	Pld	W	D	L	SF	SA	Diff	Pts
1	Tipperary	2	2	0	0	8-34	3-31	+18	4
2	Limerick	2	1	0	1	6-31	4-25	+12	2
3	Kerry	2	0	0	2	1-25	8-34	–30	0

=== Fixtures and results ===
14 December 2018 Round 1	Limerick	2-17 – 4-14	Tipperary	Gaelic Grounds, Limerick
19:30 GMT (UTC±0)	A Gillane 1-7 (6 f), D Reidy 1-3, B O’Connell 0-3, C Ryan 0-3, A La Touche Cosgrave 0-1.	Report	S Callinan 2-7 (1pen gl, 6f), M Kehoe, Patrick Maher 1-1 each, J Forde 0-2, R Maher 0-2, C English, D McCormack 0-1 each.	Attendance: 3,224; Referee: R McGann (Clare)

20 December 2018 Round 2	Kerry	0-11 – 4-14	Limerick	Austin Stack Park, Tralee
19:30 GMT (UTC±0)	S Conway 0-4 (2f), P Boyle 0-3 (2f), M O'Leary 0-2, J Conway and J Diggins 0-1 each	Report	B Murphy 1-6 (0-4frees), O O'Reilly 1-1, D Reidy 1-0 and G Mulcahy 1-0 each, G Hegarty 0-3 (1 sideline), C Ryan 0-2 (1f), T Morrissey and D Byrnes 0-1 each	Attendance: 799; Referee: C Lyons (Cork)

5 January 2019 Round 3	Tipperary	4-20 – 1-14	Kerry	MacDonagh Park, Nenagh
14:00 GMT (UTC±0)	J Forde 1-5 (0-2f, 0-1 ’65), N McGrath 1-4, M Kehoe 1-3, Patrick Maher 1-0, J Morris 0-3, M Breen 0-1, W Connors 0-1, D McCormack 0-1, C Darcy 0-1, D Maher 0-1.	Report	B Barrett 0-5 (0-4f), S Conway 1-2, M O’Leary 0-3, J Goulding 0-2, N O’Mahony 0-1, P Boyle 0-1.	Attendance: 1,186; Referee: N Wall (Cork)

== Group B ==
=== Table ===
Pos	Team	Pld	W	D	L	SF	SA	Diff	Pts
1	Clare	2	2	0	0	3-40	3-37	+3	4
2	Waterford	2	1	0	1	4-40	3-38	+5	2
3	Cork	2	0	0	2	1-39	2-44	–8	0

=== Fixtures and results ===
29 December 2018 Round 1	Clare	1-20 – 0-21	Cork	Cusack Park, Ennis
14:00 GMT (UTC±0)	N Deasy (0-10) 0-7 f’s, C Guilfoyle (1-0), G Cooney (0-3), D Ryan (0-3), D Conroy (0-2), C Malone, R Taylor (0-1) each.	Report	D Dalton (0-10) 0-7 f’s, 0-2 ‘65’s 1 sideline. M O’Halloran (0-4), J Coughlan (0-4) 1 f, R O’Flynn (0-2), C Murphy (0-1).	Attendance: 1,987; Referee: F Horgan (Tipperary)

2 January 2019 Round 2	Cork	1-18 – 1-24	Waterford	Mallow GAA Complex, Mallow
19:30 GMT (UTC±0)	D Dalton 0-9 (0-7 frees), C Murphy 0-3, A Walsh 1-0, M O’Halloran 0-2, T O’Mahony, C Joyce, R O’Flynn, W Kearney 0-1 each.	Report	S Bennett 0-13 (0-12 frees), M Kearney 0-4, M Walsh 1-0, J Barron, K Moran, T Ryan 0-2 each, J Prendergast 0-1.	Attendance: 2,021; Referee: Johnny Murphy (Limerick)

6 January 2019 Round 3	Waterford	3-16 – 2-20	Clare	Fraher Field, Dungarvan
14:00 GMT (UTC±0)	S Bennett 2-12 (1-10f); T Ryan 1-1; DJ Foran, K Moran, M Kearney 0-1 each.	Report	D Ryan 0-6; N Deasy 0-5 (3f); T Kelly 1-2; C Guilfoyle 1-1; S Golden 0-3; R Taylor, A McCarthy, D Conroy 0-1 each.	Attendance: 3,039; Referee: K Jordan (Tipperary)

== Final ==
13 January 2019 Final	Tipperary	1-18 – 4-19	Clare	Gaelic Grounds, Limerick
14:00 GMT (UTC±0)	S Callanan (0-9, six frees, one 65), J Forde (0-5, one sideline), D McCormack (1-0), A Flynn (0-2), M Kehoe (0-1), N McGrath (0-1).	Report	T Kelly (2-3; 0-1f); C Guilfoyle (1-3), C McInerney (1-2), D Ryan (0-3), N Deasy (0-3, two frees), R Taylor (0-2); S Golden (0-2), M O’Malley (0-1).	Attendance: 4,531; Referee: T Walsh (Waterford)

== League statistics ==
=== Top scorers ===
Top scorers overall

Rank	Player	Team	Tally	Total	Matches	Average
1	Stephen Bennett	Waterford	2-25	31	2	15.50
2	Séamus Callanan	Tipperary	2-16	22	2	11.00
3	Declan Dalton	Cork	0-19	19	2	9.50
4	Niall Deasy	Clare	0-18	18	3	6.00
5	Tony Kelly	Clare	4-05	14	2	7.00
5	Jason Forde	Tipperary	1-11	14	3	4.66
6	Colin Guilfoyle	Clare	3-04	13	3	4.33
7	Diarmuid Ryan	Clare	0-12	12	3	4.00
8	Mark Kehoe	Tipperary	2-05	11	3	3.66
9	Aaron Gillane	Limerick	1-07	10	1	10.00

Top scorers in a single game

Rank	Player	Team	Tally	Total	Opposition
1	Stephen Bennett	Waterford	2-12	18	Clare
2	Séamus Callanan	Tipperary	2-07	13	Limerick
2	Stephen Bennett	Waterford	0-13	13	Cork
3	Aaron Gillane	Limerick	1-07	10	Tipperary
3	Niall Deasy	Clare	0-10	10	Cork
3	Declan Dalton	Cork	0-10	10	Clare
4	Tony Kelly	Clare	2-03	9	Tipperary
4	Barry Murphy	Limerick	1-06	9	Kerry
4	Declan Dalton	Cork	0-09	9	Waterford
4	Séamus Callanan	Tipperary	0-09	9	Limerick
