= 2018 Munster Senior Hurling League =

- Dates: 30 December 2017 – 14 January 2018
- Teams: 4
- Sponsor: Co-Op Superstores
- Champions: Limerick (1st title); Paul Browne (final captain); Declan Hannon (captain); John Kiely (manager)
- Runners-up: Clare; Patrick O'Connor (captain); Donal Moloney and Gerry O'Connor (manager)

Tournament statistics
- Matches played: 6
- Goals scored: 17 (2.83 per match)
- Points scored: 207 (34.5 per match)
- Top scorer(s): Aaron Gillane (1-21)

The 2018 Munster Senior Hurling League, known for sponsorship reasons as the Co-Op Superstores Munster Hurling League, was the third Munster Senior Hurling League, an annual hurling league competition for county teams from the province of Munster. The league began on 30 December 2017 and ended on 14 January 2018.

Cork were the defending champions. Tipperary and Waterford did not participate in the league.

The group stage saw Kerry defeat Cork in senior hurling for the first time since the 1891 Munster semi-final.

On 14 January 2018, Limerick won the league title following a 0-16 to 0-10 defeat of Clare. It was their first Munster SHL title.

== Format ==
Each team plays each other team once, earning 2 points for a win and 1 for a draw. The top two teams advance to the final.

== Results ==
=== Table ===
| Pos | Team | Pld | W | D | L | SF | SA | Diff | Pts |
|---|---|---|---|---|---|---|---|---|---|
| 1 | Clare | 2 | 2 | 0 | 0 | 8-37 | 0-30 | 31 | 4 |
| 2 | Limerick | 2 | 2 | 0 | 0 | 5-42 | 2-36 | 15 | 4 |
| 3 | Kerry | 3 | 1 | 0 | 2 | 2-50 | 8-52 | –20 | 2 |
| 4 | Cork | 3 | 0 | 0 | 3 | 2-52 | 7-63 | –25 | 0 |

=== Round 1 ===
| 30 December 2017 Round 1 | Clare | 4-20 – 0-12 | Kerry | Limerick Institute of Technology, Limerick |
| | David Reidy (1-3), Niall Deasy (0-5, 1f) Shane O’Donnell, Cathal O’Connell, Bobby Duggan (1-1 each), Colin Guilfoyle (0-3), Daragh Corry, Ryan Taylor (0-2 each), Cathal Malone, John Conlon (0-1 each) | Report | Shane Nolan (0-7, 5f, 1’65), Daithi Griffin, Daniel Collins (0-2 each, Collins 1f) Padraig Boyle (0-1) | Referee: Johnny Murphy (Limerick) |

| 30 December 2017 Round 1 | Cork | 1-21 – 2-23 | Limerick | Mallow GAA Complex, Mallow |
| | Robert O’Shea 0-5 (1free), Jack O’Connor 1-2, Eoghan Finn 0-4, Dean Brosnan 0-3, Christopher Joyce 0-2, Robbie O’Flynn, Brian Lawton, Daniel Kearney, Brian Murray and Patrick Collins (free) 0-1 each | Report | Aaron Gillane 1-9 (0-5frees), Seamus Flanagan 1-2, Tom Morrissey 0-4, Barry Nash, Doiarmaid Byrnes 0-2 each, Cian Lynch, Paul Browne, Darragh O’Donovan and Pat Ryan 0-1 each | Attendance: 1,364; Referee: Philip Kelly (Tipperary) |

=== Round 2 ===
| 7 January 2018 Round 2 | Limerick | 3-19 - 1-15 | Kerry | Gaelic Grounds, Limerick |
| | Barry Nash 1-5, Seamus Flanagan 2-2, Aaron Gillane 0-4 (2frees), Andrew La Touche Cosgrave, Darragh O'Donovan 0-2 each, Declan Hannon, Cian Lynch, Diarmaid Byrnes and Paddy O'Loughlin 0-1 each. | Report | Padraig Boyle 1-10 (1-8frees), Daniel Collins 0-2, Jordan Conway, Daniel O'Carroll and Brandon Barrett 0-1 each. | Attendance: 485; Referee: J Larkin (Cork) |

| 7 January 2018 Round 2 | Clare | 4-17 - 0-18 | Cork | Cusack Park, Ennis |
| | Peter Duggan 2-0, Cathal Malone, Niall Deasy (0-1f) 1-2 each, Ian Galvin 0-3, Seadna Morey, David Reidy, Tony Kelly, Mickey O’Neill 0-2 each, Billy Connors, Ryan Taylor 0-1 each. | Report | Rob O’Shea 0-5 (0-2f), Declan Dalton 0-4 (0-4f), Daniel Kearney 0-3, Lorcan McLoughlin, Eoin Murphy 0-2 each, Eoghan Finn, John Looney 0-1 each. | Referee: J McCormack (Tipperary) |

=== Round 3 ===
| 14 January 2018 Round 3 | Kerry | 1-23 - 1-13 | Cork | Austin Stack Park, Tralee |
| | Shane Conway 0-10 (0-4 f), Colum Harty 1-1, Pádraig Boyle 0-4, Shane Nolan 0-3, Seán Weir 0-2, B Barrett, J Goulding, Daithí Griffin 0-1 each. | Report | Declan Dalton 0-8 (7 f), John Looney 1-0, Eoghan Keniry 0-3, Luke Meade, Aaron Myers 0-1 each. | Attendance: 433; Referee: T Walsh (Waterford) |

The final group game was cancelled, as Limerick and Clare had already reached the final.

=== Final ===
| 14 January 2018 Final | Limerick | 0-16 – 0-10 | Clare | Gaelic Grounds, Limerick |
| 14:00 | Aaron Gillane 0-8 (0-5f), Tom Morrissey 0-4, Paul Browne, Seamus Flanagan, Barry O’Connell, Gearoid Hegarty 0-1 each. | Report | Cathal Malone 0-4, Cathal O’Connell 0-2 (0-1f), Niall Deasy (0-1f), Podge Collins, Tony Kelly, David Reidy (0-1f) 0-1 each. | Attendance: 3,209; Referee: C McAllister (Cork) |

== League statistics ==
=== Top scorers ===
Top scorers overall

| Rank | Player | Team | Tally | Total | Matches | Average |
|---|---|---|---|---|---|---|
| 1 | Aaron Gillane | Limerick | 1-21 | 24 | 3 | 8.00 |
| 2 | Pádraig Boyle | Kerry | 1-15 | 18 | 3 | 6.00 |
| 3 | Séamus Flanagan | Limerick | 3-5 | 14 | 3 | 4.66 |
| 4 | Declan Dalton | Cork | 0-12 | 12 | 2 | 6.00 |
| 5 | Niall Deasy | Clare | 1-8 | 11 | 3 | 3.66 |
| 6 | Cathal Malone | Clare | 1-7 | 10 | 3 | 3.33 |
| 6 | Barry Nash | Limerick | 1-7 | 10 | 2 | 5.00 |
| 6 | Rob O'Shea | Cork | 0-10 | 10 | 2 | 5.00 |
| 6 | Shane Conway | Kerry | 0-10 | 10 | 3 | 3.33 |
| 6 | Shane Nolan | Kerry | 0-10 | 10 | 2 | 5.00 |

Top scorers in a single game

| Rank | Player | Team | Tally | Total | Opposition |
|---|---|---|---|---|---|
| 1 | Pádraig Boyle | Kerry | 1-10 | 13 | Limerick |
| 2 | Aaron Gillane | Limerick | 1-9 | 12 | Cork |
| 3 | Shane Conway | Kerry | 0-10 | 10 | Cork |
| 4 | Séamus Flanagan | Limerick | 2-2 | 8 | Kerry |
| 4 | Barry Nash | Limerick | 1-5 | 8 | Kerry |
| 4 | Aaron Gillane | Limerick | 0-8 | 8 | Clare |
| 4 | Declan Dalton | Cork | 0-8 | 8 | Kerry |
| 5 | Shane Nolan | Kerry | 0-7 | 7 | Clare |
| 6 | Peter Duggan | Clare | 2-0 | 6 | Clare |
| 6 | David Reidy | Clare | 1-3 | 6 | Kerry |

=== Miscellaneous ===
- Kerry's 1-23 to 1-13 defeat of Cork was their first competitive senior victory over their neighbours since the 1891 Munster Championship.
