= Stephen McDonnell (hurler) =

Irish hurler (born 1989)

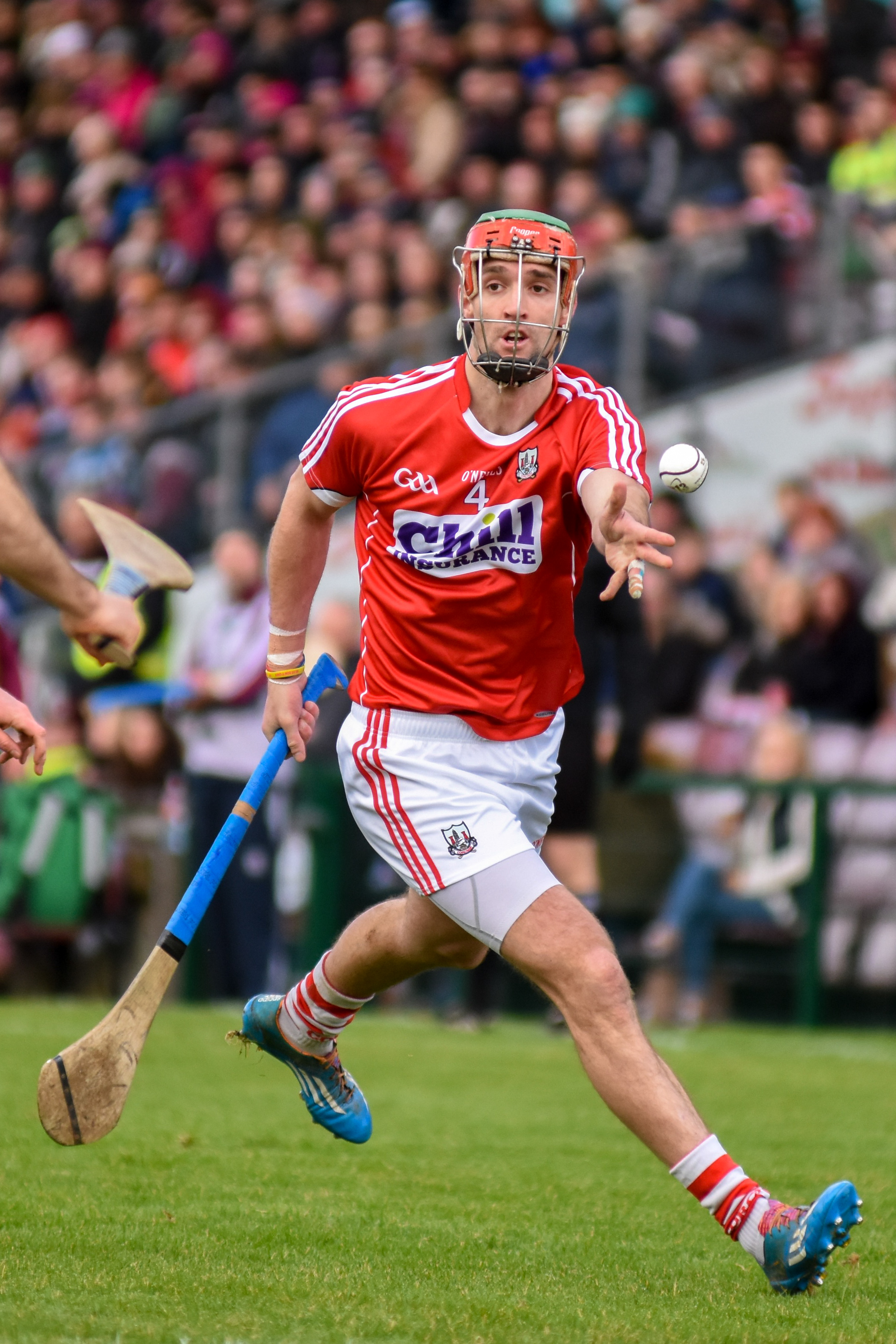

Personal information
- Native name: Stiofáin Mac Domhnaill (Irish)
- Born: 28 January 1989 (age 37) Blackpool, Cork, Ireland
- Occupation: Performance coach
- Height: 1.88 m (6 ft 2 in)

Sport
- Sport: Hurling
- Position: Left corner-back
Club
- Years: Club
- 2006-present: Glen Rovers
Club titles
- Cork titles: 2
College
- Years: College
- 2008-2012: Cork Institute of Technology
College titles
- Fitzgibbon titles: 0
Inter-county*
Years	County	Apps (scores)
2011-2021	Cork	32 (0-00)
Inter-county titles
- Munster titles: 2
- All-Irelands: 0
- NHL: 0
- All Stars: 0
- *Inter County team apps and scores correct as of 18:52, 14 November 2020.

Stephen McDonnell (born 28 January 1989) is an Irish hurler who plays as a corner-back for Premier Senior Championship club Glen Rovers. He made 70 appearances for the Cork senior hurling team between 2011 and 2020, serving as captain for two seasons.

McDonnell began his inter-county career as captain of the Cork minor team in 2007. After a stint with the under-21 team, he joined the Cork senior team for the 2011 season and made his last appearance as a substitute during the 2020 qualifiers. In the interim, McDonnell started in the 2013 All-Ireland final draw and replay defeat by Clare and won two Munster Championship titles, the second as captain of the team in 2017.

After a successful underage career, McDonnell made his senior club championship debut with Glen Rovers as a 17-year-old in 2006 and has since established himself as one of the mainstays of the team. He was a member of the Glen Rovers team that won County Championship titles in 2015 and 2016.

== Playing career ==
=== Cork Institute of Technology ===
On 3 March 2012, McDonnell lined out at full-back for the Cork Institute of Technology when they faced University College Cork in the Fitzgibbon Cup final. CIT suffered a 2–15 to 2–14 defeat after extra-time.

=== Glen Rovers ===
==== Minor and under-21 ====
McDonnell joined the Glen Rovers club at a young age and played in all grades at juvenile and underage levels. On 20 November 2005, he was at midfield when Glen Rovers defeated Carrigaline by 0–15 to 1–08 in the Premier County Minor Championship final.

On 11 November 2006, McDonnell was again at midfield for a second successive Premier County Minor Championship final. Bishopstown were the opponents, however,0-12 from Patrick Horgan secured an 0–18 to 2–09 victory.

McDonnell subsequently progressed onto the Glen Rovers under-21 team. On 8 November 2008, he was at left wing-back when Glen Rovers drew with Duhallow in the Cork Premier Under-21 Championship final. The replay took place on 16 November, with Glen Rovers winning by 4–15 to 2–18.

==== Senior ====
On 10 October 2010, McDonnell lined out at full-back in Glen Rovers' first Cork Senior Championship final in 19 years, however, Sarsfields won the game by 1–17 to 0–18.

On 12 October 2014, McDonnell was again at full-back when Glen Rovers faced Sarsfields in the Cork Senior Championship final. After helping to set up the Glen's opening score, the team suffered a heavy 2–18 to 0–08 defeat.

McDonnell was at right corner-back for much of the Glen's 2015 championship campaign. He was also named in that position for the final against reigning champions Sarsfields, with the Glen winning by 2–17 to 1–13. It was the club's first championship title since 1989.

For the third year in-a-row, Glen Rovers qualified for the championship final on 9 October 2016. McDonnell was at full-back in the 0–19 to 2–10 defeat of Erin's Own.

On 20 October 2019, McDonnell played in his fifth final when Glen Rovers faced Imokilly. Lining out at right corner-forward, he ended the game on the losing side following a 2–17 to 1–16 defeat.

=== Cork ===
==== Minor and under-21 ====
McDonnell first played for Cork at minor level during the 2007 Championship, a year which also saw him captain the team. He made his first appearance on 2 May when he played at left wing-back in Cork's 3–15 to 0–09 defeat of Waterford. On 8 July, McDonnell was at midfield for Cork's 0–18 to 1-11 Munster Championship final defeat by Tipperary. After being substituted in that game, he was dropped from the starting fifteen for the subsequent All-Ireland Championship and replaced as captain by Ryan Clifford. On 2 September, McDonnell started the All-Ireland final against Tipperary on the bench but was introduced as a 24th-minute substitute in the 3–14 to 2–11 defeat.

On 2 June 2010, McDonnell made his first appearance for the Cork under-21 team in a 1–16 to 1–03 defeat of Waterford in the Munster Championship.

==== Senior ====
McDonnell was drafted onto the Cork senior panel by team manager Denis Walsh in advance of the 2011 season. He made his first appearance for the team on 13 February 2011 when he lined out at right corner-back in a 1–20 to 1–15 defeat of Offaly in the first round of the National League. McDonnell made six league appearances and was retained when Walsh named his panel for the 2011 Munster Championship. He made his championship debut at right corner-back on 29 May 2011 in a 3–22 to 0–23 defeat by Tipperary.

The 2012 National League saw McDonnell play a regular role on Cork's starting fifteen. On 6 May 2012, he was selected at full-back for Cork's 3–21 to 0–16 defeat by Kilkenny in the league final. McDonnell missed the subsequent Munster Championship defeat by Tipperary, however, he returned to the starting fifteen for the latter stages of the All-Ireland Championship where he again lined out at full-back.

On 14 July 2013, McDonnell lined out in his first Munster final, a game which saw Cork suffer a 0–24 to 0–15 defeat by Limerick. In spite of that defeat, Cork subsequently qualified for the All-Ireland final against Clare, with McDonnell lining out at right corner-back in the 3–16 to 0–25 draw. He was selected in the same position for the replay, which Cork lost by 5–16 to 3–16.

The 2014 season saw McDonnell secure his first silverware as Cork won the Munster Championship title after a 2–24 to 0–24 win over Limerick in the last final to be played at the old Páirc Uí Chaoimh. He ended the season by being nominated for an All-Star.

McDonnell made five appearances for Cork during the 2015 National League campaign, including at left corner-back in Cork's 1–24 to 0–17 defeat by Waterford in the league final. He lined out in all of Cork's subsequent championship games during their unsuccessful campaign. On 3 November 2015, McDonnell was appointed captain of the Cork senior hurling team. A broken elbow sustained in a challenge match ruled McDonnell out of Cork's opening Munster Championship game, while his first season as captain ended with a first championship defeat for Cork by Wexford in 60 years.

McDonnell retained the captaincy of the team for the 2017 season. He won his second Munster Championship medal on 9 July following a 1–25 to 1–20 defeat of Clare in the final. In December, McDonnell announced that he was leaving the Cork panel. Team manager John Meyler said: "Stephen’s not in our plans. He’s taking time out in 2018 so he won’t be available." After a one-year absence, it was announced in November 2018 that McDonnell would be returning to the Cork panel for the 2019 season. He made eight league and championship appearances after making his return.

The 2020 season saw McDonnell fail to make a single appearance during the National League. He was again an unused substitute for Cork's Munster Championship defeat by Waterford before coming off the bench in both of Cork's qualifier games. On 6 January 2021, McDonnell announced his retirement from inter-county hurling.

== Career statistics ==
Team	Year	National League			Munster		All-Ireland		Total	
Team	Year	Division	Apps	Score	Apps	Score	Apps	Score	Apps	Score
Cork	2011	Division 1A	6	0-00	1	0-00	3	0-00	10	0-00
Cork	2012	Division 1A	6	0-00	0	0-00	2	0-00	8	0-00
Cork	2013	Division 1A	2	0-00	2	0-00	4	0-00	8	0-00
Cork	2014	Division 1B	4	0-00	4	0-00	1	0-00	9	0-00
Cork	2015	Division 1A	5	0-00	1	0-00	3	0-00	9	0-00
Cork	2016	Division 1A	6	0-00	0	0-00	1	0-00	7	0-00
Cork	2017	Division 1A	5	0-00	3	0-00	1	0-00	9	0-00
Cork	2018	Division 1A	—		—		—		—	
Cork	2019	Division 1A	4	0-00	2	0-00	2	0-00	8	0-00
Cork	2020	Division 1A	0	0-00	0	0-00	2	0-00	2	0-00
Career total			38	0-00	13	0-00	19	0-00	70	0-00

== Honours ==
Glen Rovers

- Cork Senior Hurling Championship (2) 2015, 2016
- Cork Under-21 Hurling Championship (1): 2008
- Cork Minor Hurling Championship (2): 2005, 2006

Cork

- Munster Senior Hurling Championship (2): 2014, 2017 (c)
- Munster Senior Hurling League (1): 2017

Sporting positions
Preceded by Patrick Horgan	Cork Minor Hurling Captain; 2007	Succeeded by Ryan Clifford
Preceded by Anthony Nash	Cork Senior Hurling Captain; 2016-2017	Succeeded by Séamus Harnedy
