= 2024 Munster Senior Hurling League =

Tournament details
- Province: Munster
- Date: 2–14 January 2024
- Teams: 6
- Defending champions: Cork

Other
- Matches played: 5

The 2024 Munster Senior Hurling League, known for sponsorship reasons as the Co-Op Superstores Munster Hurling League, was an inter-county hurling competition in the province of Munster, played by all six county teams in January 2024. After the postponement of multiple games due to inclement weather, the tournament was unfinished.

== Format ==
The teams are drawn into two groups of three teams. Each team plays the other teams in its group once, earning 2 points for a win and 1 for a draw. The two group winners play in the final.

== Results ==
=== Group A ===
Pos	Team	Pld	W	D	L	PF	PA	PD	Pts	Qualification
1	Limerick	1	1	0	0	27	22	+5	2	Advance to final
2	Cork	1	1	0	0	27	24	+3	2	
3	Clare (E)	2	0	0	2	46	54	−8	0	

Updated to match(es) played on 14 January 2024. Source: Munster GAA
(E) Eliminated

=== Group B ===
Pos	Team	Pld	W	D	L	PF	PA	PD	Pts	Qualification
1	Waterford (A)	2	2	0	0	57	44	+13	4	Advance to final
2	Tipperary (E)	2	1	0	1	54	42	+12	2	
3	Kerry (E)	2	0	0	2	38	63	−25	0	

Source: Munster GAA
(A) Advance to final; (E) Eliminated

== Cancellation ==
The Cork–Limerick game was postponed three times: due to fog on 7 January, a frozen pitch on 17 January and a waterlogged pitch on 21 January. The winning team (or, in the event of a draw, Limerick) would have faced Waterford in the final, but it was decided that it would not be possible to play both games in the week of 22–28 January with the National Hurling League about to start, so the competition was left unfinished.
