= 2020 Munster Senior Hurling League =

- Dates: 15 December 2019 – 11 January 2020
- Teams: 6
- Sponsor: Co-Op Superstores
- Champions: Limerick (2nd title); Cian Lynch (captain); John Kiely (manager)
- Runners-up: Cork; Patrick Horgan (captain); Kieran Kingston (manager)

Tournament statistics
- Matches played: 7
- Goals scored: 17 (2.43 per match)
- Points scored: 274 (39.14 per match)
- Top scorer(s): David Reidy (1-29)

The 2020 Munster Senior Hurling League was the fifth staging of the Munster Senior Hurling League since its establishment by the Munster Council in 2016. The league began on 15 December 2019 and ended on 11 January 2020.

Clare were the defending champions, however, they failed to make it out of the group stage.

On 11 January 2020, Limerick won the Munster League after a 1-32 to 0-20 defeat of Cork in the final at the LIT Gaelic Grounds. This was their second league title overall and their first title since 2018.

== Competition format ==
The six teams are drawn into two groups of three teams. Each team plays the other teams in their group once, earning 2 points for a win and 1 for a draw. The two group winners advance to the final. If the final is a draw, a penalty shoot-out is used to decide the winner; there is no extra time played.

== Fixtures and results ==
=== Group 1 ===
==== Table ====
Team	Matches				Score			Pts
Team	Pld	W	D	L	For	Against	Diff	Pts
Limerick	2	2	0	0	58	42	+16	4
Clare	2	1	0	1	45	52	–7	2
Tipperary	2	0	0	2	42	51	–9	0

==== Fixtures and results ====
15 December 2019	Tipperary	1-19 – 2-17	Clare	MacDonagh Park, Nenagh
	J Forde (0-14 7f 2SC) P Flynn (0-03), T Fox (1-00), M Breen (0-01), M Kehoe (0-01)	Report	N Deasy (0-07 5f), I Galvin (1-02), P Collins (0-03), S Morey (1-00), D Ryan (0-03), A Fahey (0-01 1f), C McInerney (0-01), A McCarthy (0-01)	Attendance: 830; Referee: Colm Lyons (Cork)

20 December 2019	Limerick	2-22 – 1-17	Tipperary	LIT Gaelic Grounds, Limerick
	A Breen (1-5); D Reidy (0-6, 0-6 frees); S Flanagan (0-3); D Dempsey (1-0); D O’Connell T Morrissey (0-2 each); B Ryan, D Morrissey, P O’Loughlin, D O’Donovan (0-1 each).	Report	J Forde (0-8, 0-6 frees, 0-1 sc); J McGrath (1-2); P Flynn (0-2); M Breen, M Kehoe, W Connors, J Cahill, C Darcy (0-1 each).	Attendance: 1,628; Referee: T (Waterford)

5 January 2020	Clare	1-19 – 1-27	Limerick	O'Garney Park, Sixmilebridge
	N Deasy 0-11 (nine frees, one 65’), A Shanagher 1-1, D Ryan 0-2, S O’Halloran 0-1, M O’Neill 0-1, C Guilfoyle 0-1, T Kelly 0-1, L Corry 0-1.	Report	D Reidy 1-12 (nine frees, one 65’), A Breen 0-4, T Morrissey 0-4, R Connolly 0-2, J Considine 0-2, R Hanley 0-1, D O’Donovan 0-1, D O’Connell 0-1.	Referee: K Jordan (Tipperary)

=== Group 2 ===
==== Table ====
Team	Matches				Score			Pts
Team	Pld	W	D	L	For	Against	Diff	Pts
Cork	2	2	0	0	50	27	+23	4
Waterford	2	1	0	1	51	33	+18	2
Kerry	2	0	0	2	24	65	–41	0

==== Fixtures and results ====
20 December 2019	Cork	1-27 – 0-11	Kerry	Mallow GAA Complex, Mallow
	S Kingston 0-5 (0-1 free), R Walsh 1-2, S Twomey, C O’Leary (0-2 frees), R O’Flynn 0-4 each, M O’Halloran 0-3, B Turnbull, M Coleman (0-1 free) 0-2 each, D Cahalane 0-1.	Report	S Conway 0-7 (0-4 frees), S Nolan, D Collins, G Dooley, D O’Donoghue 0-1 each.	Attendance: 250; Referee: J O'Halloran (Limerick)

29 December 2019	Waterford	1-13 – 1-17	Cork	Fraher Field, Dungarvan
	P Curran 1-6 (0-5 frees), S Bennett 0-2 (0-1 free), S McNulty, K Moran, K Bennett, D Lyons, C Lyons 0-1 each.	Report	C Lehane 0-6 (0-3 frees, 0-1 65), T O’Connell 1-1, J O’Connor 0-3, L Meade, R O’Flynn, A Walsh 0-2 each, M O’Halloran 0-1.	Attendance: 2,976; Referee: J McCormack (Tipperary)

5 January 2020	Kerry	1-10 – 4-23	Waterford	Austin Stack Park, Tralee
	S Conway (1-8, 7f), J Conway and M Leane (0-1 each)	Report	S Bennett (1-9, 5f, 3 ‘65’s), A Gleeson (0-4, 2f), C Lyons and D Hutchinson (1-1 each), D Lyons (1-0), N Montgomery (0-3), M O’Brien (0-2), K Power, S Ryan and C Dunford (0-1 each)	Referee: R McGann (Clare)

=== Final ===
11 January 2020 Final	Limerick	1-32 – 0-20	Cork	Gaelic Grounds, Limerick
19:30 GMT (UTC±0)	D Reidy 0-11 (0-8 frees); A Gillane 1-2; D Dempsey; G Mulcahy 0-5 each; D Byrnes (0-1 free); B Nash, T Morrissey 0-2 each; C Lynch, D O’Donovan, R Hanley, G Hegarty 0-1 each	Report	C Lehane 0-5 (0-3 frees); S Twomey, C O’Leary (0-3 frees), S Harnedy 0-3 each; B Turnbull, A Walsh 0-2 each; J O’Connor, P Horgan (free) 0-1 each	Attendance: 5,295; Referee: Kevin Jordan (Tipperary)

== League statistics ==
=== Top scorers ===
Top scorers overall

Rank	Player	Club	Tally	Total	Matches	Average
1	David Reidy	Limerick	1-29	32	3	10.66
2	Shane Conway	Kerry	1-15	18	2	9.00
2	Niall Deasy	Clare	0-18	18	2	9.00
3	Jason Forde	Tipperary	0-22	22	2	11.00
4	Stephen Bennett	Waterford	1-11	14	2	7.00
5	Adrian Breen	Limerick	1-09	12	3	4.00
6	Conor Lehane	Cork	0-11	11	2	5.50
7	Patrick Curran	Waterford	1-06	9	1	9.00
8	David Dempsey	Limerick	1-05	8	3	2.66
8	Tom Morrissey	Limerick	0-08	8	3	2.66

Top scorers in a single game

Rank	Player	Club	Tally	Total	Opposition
1	David Reidy	Limerick	1-12	15	Clare
2	Jason Forde	Tipperary	0-14	14	Clare
3	Stephen Bennett	Waterford	1-09	12	Kerry
4	Shane Conway	Kerry	1-08	11	Waterford
4	Niall Deasy	Clare	0-11	11	Limerick
4	David Reidy	Limerick	0-11	11	Cork
5	Patrick Curran	Waterford	1-06	9	Cork
6	Adrian Breen	Limerick	1-05	8	Tipperary
6	Jason Forde	Tipperary	0-08	8	Limerick
7	Niall Deasy	Clare	0-07	7	Tipperary
7	Shane Conway	Kerry	0-07	7	Cork
