= Munster Senior Hurling League =

Gaelic sports provincial competition

- Current season or competition: 2026 Munster Senior Hurling League
- Irish: Sraith Shinsir Iomána na Mumhan
- Code: Hurling
- Founded: 2016; 10 years ago
- Region: Munster (GAA)
- Trophy: Munster Senior League Trophy
- No. of teams: 6
- Title holders: Limerick (4th title)
- Most titles: Limerick (4 titles)
- Sponsors: Co-Op Superstores
- Official website: Official website

The Munster Senior Hurling League is an annual hurling competition organised by the Munster Council of the Gaelic Athletic Association since 2016 for the top inter-county teams in the province of Munster in Ireland.

The series of games are played during January. The Munster Senior Hurling League is effectively a pre-season tournament. It allows teams to blood new players and to experiment prior to the opening of the National Hurling League.

2019 was the first year that all six eligible teams participated in the Munster Senior Hurling League. Participation or non-participation can be decided on an annual basis. Limerick are the current champions.

== History ==
This competition is a successor completion to the Waterford Crystal Cup which lasted from 2006 to 2015.

== Format ==
In the tournament's first three years, each team played all the others once in a single round-robin system (of 4 or 5 county teams), with the top two teams progressing to the final. In 2019 and 2020, all six counties competed, and they were drawn into two separate groups, with the two group winners meeting in the final.

In 2022 the competition was a straight knockout, with 5 teams, and was called the "Munster Hurling Cup". From 2023 onward the competition returned to the format of 2020, with two groups of three teams.

== Stadia and locations ==
Location	Stadium	Capacity
Limerick	Gaelic Grounds	44,023
Killarney	Fitzgerald Stadium	38,000
Ennis	Cusack Park	19,000
Dungarvan	Fraher Field	15,000
Tralee	Austin Stack Park	12,000
Waterford	Walsh Park	11,046
Mallow	Mallow GAA Complex	8,000
Sixmilebridge	O'Garney Park	7,000
Kilmallock	FitzGerald Park	4,000
Nenagh	MacDonagh Park	
Clarecastle	Clarecastle GAA	
Rathkeale	Mick Neville Park	

As of the 2022 season, Munster League hurling has been played in eleven stadiums since the formation of the league in 2016.

While the traditional county grounds are sometimes used for league matches, smaller club grounds have usually been used for games which may not have had such a high profile.

Munster League matches are usually played on a rolling home and away basis.

The stadiums for the 2017 league showed a large disparity in capacity: Gaelic Grounds, the home ground of Limerick has a capacity of 50,500 with O'Garney Park, one of the grounds used by Clare, having a capacity of 7,000. The combined total capacity of the Munster League in the 2017 season was 111,000.

Stadium attendances are a significant source of regular income for the Munster Council and the individual county boards.

== Roll of honour ==
County	Titles	Years winners
Limerick	4	2018, 2020, 2022, 2026
Clare	2	2016, 2019
Cork	2	2017, 2023
Tipperary	0	Best finish: 2nd, 2019 and 2023
Waterford	0	Best finish: 2nd, 2024 and 2026
Kerry	0	Best finish: 3rd, 2018 and 2022

== List of finals ==
Year	Winners		Runners-up		Venue	Winning Captain(s)	Attendance
Year	County	Score	County	Score	Venue	Winning Captain(s)	Attendance
2026	Limerick	0-23	Waterford	0-15	Mallow	William O'Donoghue	1,900
2025	Competition not held due to fixture congestion						
2024	Competition unfinished with Cork, Limerick and Waterford left in tournament.						
2023	Cork	3-14	Tipperary	1-19	Páirc Uí Rinn	Seán O’Donoghue	4,727
2022	Limerick	0-27	Clare	0-18	Cusack Park, Ennis	Barry Nash	7,992
2021	No competition due to COVID-19						
2020	Limerick	1-32	Cork	0-20	Gaelic Grounds	Cian Lynch	5,295
2019	Clare	4-19	Tipperary	1-18	Gaelic Grounds	Tony Kelly	4,531
2018	Limerick	0-16	Clare	0-10	Gaelic Grounds	Paul Browne; Declan Hannon	3,209
2017	Cork	1-21	Limerick	1-20	Gaelic Grounds	Stephen McDonnell	2,372
2016	Clare	0-18	Limerick	0-17	Gaelic Grounds	Cian Dillon; Tony Kelly	4,583

== Player records ==
=== Winning teams ===
Year	Winning county	Winning team
2023	Cork	P Collins; S O’Donoghue, R Downey, S O’Leary Hayes; C Cormack, N O’Leary, D Cahalane; T O’Connell, B Roche; S Twomey, R O’Flynn, L Meade; C Walsh, D Dalton), P Horgan
2022	Limerick	David McCarthy; Barry Nash, Dan Morrissey, Richie English; Colin Coughlan, Ronan Connolly, Paddy O’Loughlin; William O’Donoghue, Brian O’Grady; David Reidy, Cathal O’Neill, Gearoid Hegarty; Darren O’Connell, Pat Ryan, Oisin O’Reilly. Subs: Adam English, Rory Duff, Conor Boylan
2020	Limerick	Barry Hennessey; Tom Condon, Richie English, Aaron Costello; Diarmuid Byrnes, Dan Morrissey, Barry Nash; Robbie Hanley, Cian Lynch (capt); Darragh O’Donovan, Tom Morrissey, David Dempsey; Graeme Mulcahy, David Reidy, Aaron Gillane Subs: Sean Finn, Gearoid Hegarty, Mark Quinlan, Brian O’Grady, Jerome Boylan
2019	Clare	D Tuohy; J McCarthy, D McInerney, R Hayes; A McCarthy, C Cleary, C Malone; S Golden, R Taylor; D Ryan, T Kelly N Deasy; C Guilfoyle, C McInerney, M O’Neill. Subs: P Collins, D Conroy, M O’Malley, G Cooney, J Browne.
2018	Limerick	N Quaid; T Condon, S Hickey, R English; D Byrnes, D Morrissey, W O’Meara; P Browne, C Lynch; T Morrissey, D O’Donovan, B O’Connell; A Gillane, S Flanagan, G Hegarty. Subs: B Murphy, D Reidy, A La Touche Cosgrave
2017	Cork	A Nash, S McDonnell, C Spillane, D Cahalane, M Ellis, C Joyce, M Coleman, L McLoughlin, D Kearney, C Lehane, L Meade, S Kingston, A Cadogan, P Horgan, D Fitzgibbon. Subs: D Griffin, K Burke, D Brosnan, S Harnedy, C O’Sullivan.
2016	Clare	A Fahy; J Browne, P O’Connor, P Flanagan; C Dillon, D McInerney, C Cleary; G O’Connell, D Reidy; P Duggan, C Ryan, D Fitzgerald; J Conlon, D Honan, B Duggan. Subs: T Kelly, B Bolger, S Golden, C O’Connell.

== Top Scorers ==
=== All time ===
As of the 2019 league
Pos.	Name	Team	Goals	Points	Total
1	Shane Nolan	Kerry	0	55	55
2	David Reidy	Limerick	4	28	40
3	Stephen Bennett	Waterford	3	30	39
4	Patrick Horgan	Cork	2	28	34
4	Aaron Gillane	Limerick	2	28	34
5	Declan Dalton	Cork	0	33	33
6	Barry Nash	Limerick	5	15	30
7	David Reidy	Clare	2	23	29
7	Niall Deasy	Clare	1	26	29
8	Declan Hannon	Limerick	1	23	26
8	Pádraig Boyle	Kerry	1	23	26

=== Overall ===
year	Name	Team	Goals	Points	Total
2016	Declan Hannon	Limerick	1	21	24
2017	Patrick Horgan	Cork	2	27	33
2018	Aaron Gillane	Limerick	1	21	24
2019	Stephen Bennett	Waterford	2	25	31

=== Single game ===
year	Name	Team	Goals	Points	Total
2016	Declan Hannon	Limerick	1	9	12
2017	Pauric Mahony	Waterford	0	14	14
2018	Pádraig Boyle	Kerry	1	10	13
2019	Stephen Bennett	Waterford	2	12	18

=== Finals ===
year	Name	Team	Goals	Points	Total
2016	Declan Hannon	Limerick	0	7	7
2017	Peter Casey	Limerick	0	9	9
2017	Patrick Horgan	Cork	0	9	9
2018	Aaron Gillane	Limerick	0	8	8
2019	Tony Kelly	Clare	2	3	9
2019	Séamus Callanan	Tipperary	0	9	9

== See also ==
- Connacht Senior Hurling League
- Leinster Senior Hurling League (Walsh Cup)
- Ulster Senior Hurling League (Conor McGurk Cup)
