= 2017 Munster Senior Hurling League =

- Dates: 8 January 2016 – 29 January 2017
- Teams: 5
- Sponsor: Co-Op Superstores
- Champions: Cork (1st title); Stephen McDonnell (captain); Kieran Kingston (manager)
- Runners-up: Limerick; James Ryan (captain); John Kiely (manager)

Tournament statistics
- Matches played: 11
- Goals scored: 31 (2.82 per match)
- Points scored: 429 (39 per match)
- Top scorer(s): Patrick Horgan (2-27)

The 2017 Munster Senior Hurling League, known for sponsorship reasons as the Co-Op Superstores.ie Munster Hurling League, was the second Munster Senior Hurling League, the annual hurling league competition for county teams from the province of Munster.

Clare came into the season as the defending champions. For the second year in succession Tipperary declined to field a team in the league. The opening round of the league took place on 8 January 2017.

On 29 January 2017, Cork won the league title following a 1–21 to 1–20 defeat of Limerick. It was their first Munster League title.

== Format ==
Five of the six Munster teams compete in the league, with Tipperary opting not to participate.

Each team plays each other team once, earning 2 points for a win and 1 for a draw. The top two teams play each other in the final.

== Table ==
Pos	Team	Pld	W	D	L	SF	SA	Diff	Pts
1	Cork	4	4	0	0	8-94	2-71	+41	8
2	Limerick	4	3	0	1	7-86	8-71	+12	6
3	Clare	4	2	0	2	4-77	6-62	+9	4
4	Waterford	4	1	0	3	9-67	2-83	+5	2
5	Kerry	4	0	0	4	1-64	11-101	−67	0

== Round 1 ==
8 January 2017; 14:00; Round 1	Cork	1-28 - 0-18	Kerry	Mallow GAA Complex, Mallow; Referee: T Walsh (Waterford)
8 January 2017; 14:00; Round 1	S Kingston 0-9 (0-3 frees), D Fitzgibbon 1-2, M Cahalane 0-4, S Harnedy (0-2 frees), L Meade, M Coleman (0-3 frees), 0-3 each, B Cooper 0-2, L McLoughlin, B Lawton 0-1 each.	Report	S Nolan 0-9 (0-7 frees), J Conway 0-3, M O’Leary, P O’Connor 0-2 each, M Boyle, J Egan 0-1 each.	Mallow GAA Complex, Mallow; Referee: T Walsh (Waterford)

8 January 2017; 14:00; Round 1	Waterford	1-14 - 0-24	Limerick	Fraher Field, Dungarvan; Referee: J Ryan (Tipperary)
8 January 2017; 14:00; Round 1	B Nolan 0-6 (0-3f), DJ Foran 1-1, M O’Neill 0-2, S Roche, M O’Brien, G O’Brien, M Kearney, C Roche 0-1 each.	Report	J Fitzgibbon 0-8 (0-6f) A Dempsey 0-7, S Tobin 0-3, D Byrnes (0-2f), G Hegarty 0-2 each, D Hannon, K Hayes 0-1 each.	Fraher Field, Dungarvan; Referee: J Ryan (Tipperary)

== Round 2 ==
15 January 2017; 14:00; Round 2	Limerick	1-19 - 7-22	Cork	Gaelic Grounds, Limerick; Attendance: 1,625; Referee: P Kelly (Tipperary)
15 January 2017; 14:00; Round 2	R Lynch 0-11 (0-8f), B Nash 1-0, K O’Brien 0-3, A Dempsey, D Dempsey, D Byrnes, J Ryan & P Browne 0-1 each.	Report	P Horgan 2-5 (0-3f), S Kingston 2-2, A Cadogan 1-4, L Meade & M O’Halloran 1-0 each, B Cooper 0-3, M Coleman, D Fitzgibbon & R O’Flynn 0-2 each, D Kearney & B Hennessy 0-1 each.	Gaelic Grounds, Limerick; Attendance: 1,625; Referee: P Kelly (Tipperary)

15 January 2017; 14:00; Round 2	Kerry	1-15 - 2-24	Clare	Austin Stack Park, Tralee; Referee: J Mullins (Limerick)
15 January 2017; 14:00; Round 2	S Nolan 0-7, M Boyle 1-0, J Egan 0-2, J Conway 0-2, P Kelly 0-1, P O’Connor 0-1, T Casey 0-1, P Boyle 0-1.	Report	D Reidy 0-10, P Collins 1-3, K Hehir 1-1, C McInerney 0-2, P Duggan 0-2, S Morey 0-1, J McCarthy 0-1, C Galvin 0-1, C Malone 0-1, A Shanagher 0-1, A Cunningham 0-1.	Austin Stack Park, Tralee; Referee: J Mullins (Limerick)

== Round 3 ==
18 January 2017; 19:30; Round 3	Clare	0-19 - 2-15	Limerick	O'Garney Park, Sixmilebridge; Referee: C McAllister (Cork)
18 January 2017; 19:30; Round 3	D Reidy 0-5 (0-3f); J Conlon 0-4; A Cunningham 0-3; S Golden 0-2; D Fitzgerald, C O’Connell, J McCarthy, C Malone, B O’Gorman 0-1 each,	Report	D Byrnes 0-5 (0-3f); S Tobin 0-3 (0-3f); G Mulcahy, B Nash 1-0 each; J Fitzgibbon, C Lynch 0-2 each; G Hegarty, T Morrissey, P Browne 0-1 each.	O'Garney Park, Sixmilebridge; Referee: C McAllister (Cork)

18 January 2017; 19:30; Round 3	Cork	0-25 - 1-19	Waterford	Mallow GAA Complex, Mallow; Referee: F Horgan (Tipperary)
18 January 2017; 19:30; Round 3	P Horgan 0-13 (0-9 frees), D Kearney 0-5, R O’Flynn 0-2, D Brosnan, L Meade, D Fitzgibbon, S Kingston, A Cadogan 0-1 each.	Report	Shane Bennett 0-9 (0-8 frees), Stephen Bennett 0-5, E Murphy 1-1, B O’Keeffe, T Devine, B Nolan, C Roche 0-1 each.	Mallow GAA Complex, Mallow; Referee: F Horgan (Tipperary)

== Round 4 ==
22 January 2017; 14:00; Round 4	Waterford	3-13 – 2-19	Clare	Fraher Field, Dungarvan; Referee: J Larkin (Cork)
22 January 2017; 14:00; Round 4	P Hogan 2-0; B Nolan 0-6 (6fs); B O’Keeffe 1-0; DJ Foran, E Murphy 0-2 each; S Roche, S Keating, J Fagan 0-1 each.	Report	C Malone, B O’Gorman 1-1 each; J Conlon, B Duggan (4fs) 0-4 each; A Cunningham 0-3; C O’Donnell 0-2; J McCarthy, S Golden, P Duggan, J Shanahan 0-1 each.	Fraher Field, Dungarvan; Referee: J Larkin (Cork)

22 January 2017; 13:00; Round 4	Limerick	4-28 – 0-16	Kerry	Gaelic Grounds, Limerick; Referee: J McCormack (Tipperary)
22 January 2017; 13:00; Round 4	P Casey (1-9; 0-6f), B Nash (2-3), T Morrissey (1-2), R Lynch (0-6; 5f), C Lynch (0-3), K O’Brien (0-2), S Cahill (0-1), J Ryan (0-1), G Mulcahy (0-1)	Report	S Nolan (0-6; 5f), D Collins (0-4), M Boyle (0-2), J Griffin (0-1), P Boyle (0-1), J Goulding (0-1 sideline), S Murphy (0-1).	Gaelic Grounds, Limerick; Referee: J McCormack (Tipperary)

== Round 5 ==
25 January 2017; 19:30; Round 5	Clare	0-15 – 0-19	Cork	O'Garney Park, Sixmilebridge; Referee: J Murphy (Limerick)
25 January 2017; 19:30; Round 5	C O’Connell 0-6 (5f); B Duggan 0-4 (3f); A Cunningham, S Golden 0-2 each; S Morey 0-1	Report	C Lehane 0-8 (4f); D Kearney 0-3; D Dalton (1f), S O’Keeffe 0-2 each; C Murphy, M O’Halloran, D Brosnan 0-1 each	O'Garney Park, Sixmilebridge; Referee: J Murphy (Limerick)

28 January 2017; 12:30; Round 5	Waterford	4-21 – 0-15	Kerry	Fraher Field, Dungarvan
28 January 2017; 12:30; Round 5	P Mahony 0-14, A Gleeson 1-2, T Ryan 1-1, Stephen Bennett 1-0, M Walsh 1-0, B O'Halloran 0-3, C Gleeson 0-1.		S Nolan 0-7, M Boyle 0-2, D Collins 0-2, P Boyle 0-2, J Egan 0-1, J Goulding 0-1, C Harty 0-1.	Fraher Field, Dungarvan

== Final ==
29 January 2017; 14:00; Final	Limerick	1-20 - 1-21	Cork	Gaelic Grounds, Limerick; Attendance: 2,372; Referee: P Kelly (Tipperary)
29 January 2017; 14:00; Final	P Casey (0-9, 0-7 frees); D Dempsey (1-3), D Byrnes (0-4, 0-3 frees); G Mulcahy, B Nash, K Hayes, G Hegarty (0-1 each).	Report	P Horgan (0-9, 0-7 frees); A Cadogan (1-2) C Lehane, S Kingston (0-3); D Brosnan, M Coleman, D Kearney, S Harnedy (0-1 each).	Gaelic Grounds, Limerick; Attendance: 2,372; Referee: P Kelly (Tipperary)

== Scoring statistics ==
Top scorers overall

Rank	Player	Team	Tally	Total	Matches	Average
1	Patrick Horgan	Cork	2-27	33	3	11.00
2	Shane Nolan	Kerry	0-29	29	4	7.25
3	Shane Kingston	Cork	2-15	21	4	5.25
3	Peter Casey	Limerick	1-18	21	2	10.50
5	Ronan Lynch	Limerick	0-17	17	2	8.50
6	Barry Nash	Limerick	4-04	16	4	4.00
7	David Reidy	Clare	0-15	15	4	3.75
8	Pauric Mahony	Waterford	0-14	14	1	14.00
9	Alan Cadogan	Cork	2-07	13	4	3.25
9	Billy Nolan	Waterford	0-13	13	3	4.33

Top scorers in a single game

Rank	Player	Team	Tally	Total	Opposition
1	Pauric Mahony	Waterford	0-14	14	Kerry
2	Patrick Horgan	Cork	0-13	13	Waterford
3	Barry Nash	Limerick	2-03	12	Kerry
3	Peter Casey	Limerick	1-09	12	Kerry
5	Patrick Horgan	Cork	2-05	11	Limerick
5	Ronan Lynch	Limerick	0-11	11	Cork
7	David Reidy	Clare	0-10	10	Kerry
8	Shane Kingston	Cork	0-09	9	Kerry
8	Shane Nolan	Kerry	0-09	9	Cork
8	Shane Bennett	Waterford	0-09	9	Cork
8	Patrick Horgan	Cork	0-09	9	Limerick
8	Peter Casey	Limerick	0-09	9	Cork

Goalkeeping clean sheets

Rank	Goalkeeper	County	Clean sheets
1	Ian O'Regan	Waterford	2
2	Patrick Collins	Cork	1
2	Nickie Quaid	Limerick	1
2	Barry Hennessy	Limerick	1
2	Declan Dalton	Cork	1
2	Andrew Fahey	Limerick	1
