= Declan Hannon =

Limerick hurler (born 1992)

Personal information
- Native name: Déaglán hAnnáin (Irish)
- Born: 25 November 1992 (age 33) Adare, County Limerick, Ireland
- Occupation: Recruitment consultant
- Height: 1.88 m (6 ft 2 in)

Sport
- Sport: Hurling
- Position: Centre-back
Club
- Years: Club
- 2009–: Adare
Club titles
- Limerick titles: 1
College
- Years: College
- Mary Immaculate College
College titles
- Fitzgibbon titles: 1
Inter-county*
Years	County	Apps (scores)
2011–2025	Limerick	67 (1–104)
Inter-county titles
- Munster titles: 7
- All-Irelands: 5
- NHL: 2
- All Stars: 3
- *Inter County team apps and scores correct as of 19:37, 21 June 2025.

Declan Hannon (born 25 November 1992) is an Irish former hurler who played for Limerick Senior Championship club Adare and previously at inter-county level as captain of the Limerick senior hurling team. He captained Limerick to the All Ireland hurling title in 2018, 2020, 2021, 2022 and 2023 becoming the first Limerick captain since Mick Mackey to captain Limerick to victory more than once. He is the only hurling captain to lift the Liam MacCarthy Cup a record four times as well as lifting the Mackey cup in the Munster hurling final six times. He is the most successful hurling captain in hurling history. He usually lined out as a centre-back.

== Early life ==
Hannon attended Scoil Naomh Iosaf, an all boys school situated in the village of Adare. Hurling was a pillar of the education system in the school, pushed by two Tipperary men, Brother Cathal Duane (Kilruane) and Principal Barry O'Riordan (Nenagh). Hannon was born in Adare, County Limerick. His granduncle, Pat Stakelum, captained Tipperary to the All-Ireland title in 1949.

== Playing career ==
=== Ardscoil Rís ===
Hannon first came to prominence as a hurler with Ardscoil Rís in Limerick. Having played in every grade as a hurler, he was centre-back on the college's senior hurling team. On 11 March 2010, Hannon scored three points from play when Ardscoil Rís defeated Thurles CBS in the final of the Harty Cup.

On 27 February 2011, Hannon was again at centre-back when Ardscoil Rís retained the Harty Cup title after a 3–19 to 0–03 defeat of C.B.S. Charleville in the final.

=== Mary Immaculate College ===
During his studies at Mary Immaculate College, Hannon was selected for the college's senior hurling team. On 27 February 2016, he won a Fitzgibbon Cup medal as Mary I won their first ever title after a 1–30 to 3–22 defeat of the University of Limerick after two periods of extra-time. Hannon, in spite of being substituted in the 79th minute, ended as the game's top scorer. He said of the game "That was one of the most unbelievable games I have played in. We had it won and lost so many times throughout the game, but we’d have stayed until midnight to win."

=== Adare ===
Hannon joined the Adare club at a young age and played in all grades at juvenile and underage levels. He enjoyed championship success in the under-14 and under-16 grades before making his championship debut with the club's senior team as a sixteen-year-old. On 18 October 2009, Hannon scored three points from right wing-forward when Adare defeated Na Piarsaigh by 1–17 to 0–03 in the final of the Limerick Senior Championship.

=== Limerick ===
==== Minor and under-21 ====
Hannon first played for Limerick at minor level. He made his first appearance on 25 June 2010 in a 1–17 to 2–12 defeat by Clare in the Munster Championship.

Hannon subsequently joined the Limerick under-21 hurling team. On 3 August 2011, he scored 1-04 from play when Limerick defeated Cork by 4–20 to 1–27 in the final of the Munster Championship.

==== Senior ====
On 17 April 2010, Hannon made his senior debut at right wing-forward for Limerick in a National League defeat of Antrim at Loughguile. He later won a National League Division 2 medal after a 4–12 to 2–13 defeat of Clare in the final.

On 14 July 2013, Hannon was at full-forward in Limerick's 0–24 to 0–15 defeat of Cork in the Munster final.

Hannon's performances during the 2011 and 2014 seasons earned him All-Star nominations.

In December 2017, Hannon was appointed captain of the Limerick senior hurling team for the 2018 season. On 19 August 2018, he scored two points from play and captained Limerick to their first All-Ireland title in 45 years after a 3–16 to 2–18 defeat of Galway in the final. Later that day Hannon was named on The Sunday Game Team of the Year. He ended the season by winning an All-Star Award.

On 31 March 2019, Hannon was selected at centre-back for Limerick's National League final meeting with Waterford at Croke Park. He collected a winners' medal and the cup after contributing with a point in the 1–24 to 0–19 victory. On 30 June 2019, Hannon won his first Munster Championship medal in six years after captaining Limerick to a 2–26 to 2–14 defeat of Tipperary in the final.

Hannon won a second successive National League medal on 25 October 2020, after captaining Limerick to a 0–36 to 1–23 defeat of Clare in the delayed 2020 league final. On 15 November 2020, he won a third Munster Championship medal after captaining Limerick to a 0–25 to 0–21 win over Waterford in the final. Hannon was the first Limerick player since Mick Mackey to captain the team to two provincial title successes.

Hannon entered the history books in 2022 when he became the first hurling captain to lift the Liam MacCarthy Cup on four occasions.

He won a fifth All-Ireland medal in 2023, but missed the All-Ireland semi-final and final with a knee injury.

In October 2025, Hannon announced his retirement from inter-county hurling after 15 years with the Limerick Senior team.

=== Munster ===
On 19 February 2012, Hannon was an unused substitute in Munster's 3–14 to 1-16 Railway Cup semi-final defeat by Leinster.

== Personal life ==
In September 2023, Hannon married radio presenter Louise Cantillon with the reception at Adare Manor.

== Career statistics ==
As of match played 21 June 2025.

Team	Year	National League			Munster		All-Ireland		Total	
Team	Year	Division	Apps	Score	Apps	Score	Apps	Score	Apps	Score
Limerick	2011	Division 2	2	1-07	0	0-00	3	0-28	5	1-35
Limerick	2012	Division 1B	0	0-00	1	0-01	4	1-12	5	1-13
Limerick	2013	Division 1B	5	3-35	2	0-17	1	0-02	8	3-54
Limerick	2014	Division 1B	1	0-00	2	0-02	2	0-09	5	0-11
Limerick	2015	Division 1B	5	1-07	2	0-03	2	0-05	9	1-15
Limerick	2016	Division 1B	5	3-23	1	0-02	2	0-03	8	3-28
Limerick	2017	Division 1B	7	0-02	1	0-00	1	0-00	9	0-02
Limerick	2018	Division 1B	5	0-00	4	0-00	4	0-03	13	0-03
Limerick	2019	Division 1A	6	0-02	4	0-02	1	0-00	11	0-04
Limerick	2020	Division 1A	5	0-02	3	0-01	2	0-02	10	0-04
Limerick	2021	Division 1A	2	0-01	2	0-00	2	0-02	6	0-03
	2022	Division 1A	5	0-01	5	0-03	2	0-02	12	0-06
	2023		3	0-03	5	0-02	0	0-00	8	0-05
	2024		2	0-00	5	0-02	1	0-00	8	0-02
	2025		0	0-00	2	0-01	1	0-00	3	0-01
Total			53	8-83	39	0-36	28	1-68	119	10-187

== Honours ==
Ardscoil Rís

- Harty Cup (2): 2010, 2011

Mary Immaculate College

- Fitzgibbon Cup (1): 2016

Adare

- Limerick Senior Hurling Championship (1): 2009
- Limerick Senior Football Championship (3): 2017, 2018, 2020
- Limerick Intermediate Football Championship (1): 2016

Limerick

- All-Ireland Senior Hurling Championship (5): 2018 (c), 2020 (c), 2021 (c), 2022 (c), 2023
- Munster Senior Hurling Championship (7): 2013, 2019 (c), 2020 (c), 2021 (c), 2022 (c), 2023 (c), 2024 (c)
- National Hurling League (2): 2019 (c), 2020 (c)
- National Hurling League Division 2 (1): 2011
- Munster Senior Hurling League (2): 2018 (c), 2020 (c)
- Waterford Crystal Cup (1): 2015
- Munster Under-21 Hurling Championship (1): 2011

Awards

- All-Star Award (3): 2018, 2021, 2022
- The Sunday Game Team of the Year (3): 2018, 2021, 2022

Sporting positions
Preceded by James Ryan	Limerick Senior Hurling Captain; 2018-2019	Succeeded by Tom Morrissey
Preceded by Tom Morrissey	Limerick Senior Hurling Captain; 2019-2023	Succeeded by Cian Lynch
Achievements
Preceded by David Burke	All-Ireland Senior Hurling Final winning captain 2018	Succeeded by Séamus Callanan
Preceded by Séamus Callanan	All-Ireland Senior Hurling Final winning captain 2020-2022	Succeeded by Cian Lynch
