= 2016 Munster Senior Hurling League =

- Dates: 3 January 2016 – 23 January 2016
- Teams: 5
- Champions: Clare (1st title); Tony Kelly & Cian Dillon (captain); Davy Fitzgerald (manager)
- Runners-up: Limerick; Nicky Quaid (captain); T. J. Ryan (manager)

Tournament statistics
- Matches played: 10
- Goals scored: 17 (1.7 per match)
- Points scored: 330 (33 per match)
- Top scorer(s): Declan Hannon (1-21)

The 2016 Munster Senior Hurling League was the inaugural staging of the Munster Senior Hurling League. The fixtures were announced on 4 December 2015. The league began on 3 January 2016 and ended on 23 January 2016.

On 23 January 2016, Clare won the league following an 0-18 to 0-17 defeat of Limerick in the final.

Limerick's Declan Hannon was the league's top scorer with 1-21.

The league attracted almost 12,000 spectators in total, an average of 1,192 per match.

== Format ==
Five of the six Munster teams compete in the league, with Tipperary opting not to participate. Unlike its predecessor, the Waterford Crystal Cup, the league is confined to inter-county teams only. This means that third level institutions are not permitted to take part.

Each team plays the other teams in its group once, earning 2 points for a win and 1 for a draw. Originally the top two teams were to play each other in the final, but as both Clare and Limerick won their first three games, it was decided that the last group game would double up as the Munster Senior Hurling League final.

== Details ==
=== Table ===
	Team	Pld	W	D	L	SF	SA	SD	Pts
1	Clare	3	3	0	0	4-61	1-31	+39	6
2	Limerick	3	3	0	0	8-56	1-53	+24	6
3	Cork	4	2	0	2	3-70	4-62	+5	4
4	Waterford	4	1	0	3	2-56	6-62	–18	2
5	Kerry	4	0	0	4	0-52	5-87	–50	0

=== Fixtures/results ===
Round 1

3 January 2016 Round 1	Limerick	2-23 - 0-18	Kerry	FitzGerald Park, Kilmallock
14:00	D Reidy 1-4, T Morrissey and D Hannon (free) 0-5 each, S Tobin 0-3 (1free), M Ryan 1-0, D Byrnes 0-2 (free and ‘65), G O’Mahony, J Fitzgibbon, P Browne and D O'Donovan 0-1 each.	Report	S Nolan 0-8 (5frees, 1 ‘65), J Griffin 0-3, P Lucid and B O'Leary 0-2 each, K Carmody, P O'Connor, M O'Leary 0-1 each.	Attendance: 653; Referee: J McCormack (Tipperary)

3 January 2016 Round 1	Clare	1-14 - 0-14	Cork	O'Garney Park, Sixmilebridge
14:00	T Kelly (0-4 fs) 0-6; S O'Donnell 1-0; G O'Connell, J Conlon (fs), B Duggan (fs) 0-2 each; P Duggan, M O'Malley, 0-1 each.	Report	P O'Sullivan 0-7 (0-6 fs); W Leahy 0-2; P Collins (f), L Meade, P Haughney, M Ellis, D Brosnan, 0-1 each.	Attendance: 1,309; Referee: J Murphy (Limerick)

Round 2

10 January 2016 Round 2	Cork	1-20 - 0-18	Kerry	Mallow GAA Complex, Mallow
	C Lehane 0-6 (0-2 frees), L O’Farrell 1-3, S Harnedy 0-4 (0-2 frees), B Moylan (0-1 free), D Brosnan, A Cadogan 0-2 each, C O’Leary 0-1.	Report	M O’Leary, S Nolan (frees) 0-5 each, C Harty 0-3, P Lucid 0-2, B O’Leary, J Conway, J Goulding 0-1 each.	Attendance: 750; Referee: R McGann (Clare)

19 January 2016 Round 2	Waterford	1-17 - 3-16	Limerick	Carriganore Sports Campus, Waterford
	M Shanahan (0-7, 5fs), A Gleeson (1-0), J Dillon (0-3), P Curran (0-2), S Bennett (0-2), S McNulty (0-1), J Barron (0-1), P Hogan (0-1).	Report	D Reidy (1-5, 0-2f), K O’Brien (1-1), T Morrissey (1-1), S Tobin (0-3), D Byrnes (0-2, 1f), G O’Mahony (0-2), T O’Brien (0-2).	Attendance: 1,069; Referee: P Kelly (Tipperary)

Round 3

13 January 2016 Round 3	Clare	2-27 - 0-8	Kerry	O'Garney Park, Sixmilebridge
19:30	P Duggan (2-2), Colin Ryan (0-8, 7f), J Conlon (0-3), C O’Connell (0-3, 1f), C O’Donnell (0-2), D Reidy (0-2), G O’Connell (0-2), C Dillon (0-1), D Honan (0-1), M O’Malley (0-1), D Keane (0-1), D Conroy (0-1).	Report	C Harty (0-3, 2f), J Conway (0-2, 1f), B O’Leary (0-1), M Boyle (0-1), J Buckley (0-1).	Attendance: 510; Referee: J. Larkin (Cork)

13 January 2016 Round 3	Cork	2-18 - 0-13	Waterford	Mallow GAA Complex, Mallow
19:30	P Cronin (1-8, 0-6f, 0-1'65), W Leahy (1-1), L O’Farrell (0-3), S Harnedy (0-2), B Cooper (0-1), D Brosnan (0-1), P O’Rourke (0-1), S Moylan (0-1).	Report	Shane Bennett (0-6, 4f, 1'65), T Ryan (0-2), T Waring (0-2), S O’Sullivan (0-1), A Molumby (0-1), M Kearney (0-1).	Attendance: 588; Referee: D. O'Driscoll (Limerick)

Round 4

17 January 2016 Round 4	Cork	0-18 – 3-17	Limerick	Mallow GAA Complex, Mallow
14:00	P O’Sullivan 0-7 (0-5 frees, 0-1 65), P Cronin 0-4, C Lehane 0-3, W Leahy 0-2, P Haughney, P Horgan 0-1 each.	Report	D Hannon 1-9 (0-7 frees, 0-1 65), G Mulcahy 1-2, C Lynch 0-3, D O’Donovan 1-0, P Ryan, D Reidy, P Browne 0-1 each.	Attendance: 1,185; Referee: T Walsh (Waterford)

17 January 2016 Round 4	Waterford	1-9 – 1-20	Clare	Carriganore Sports Campus, Waterford
14:00	T Ryan 0-7 (6fs), A Molumby 1-0, P Prendergast, B Nolan 0-1 each.	Report	C Ryan 0-7 (4fs, 1 65), J Conlon 0-5, D Honan 0-4, D Reidy 1-0, M O’Malley 0-2, T Kelly, C O’Connell 0-1 each.	Attendance: 500 est. Referee: J O'Brien (Tipperary)

Round 5

23 January 2016 Round 5	Kerry	0-8 — 0-17	Waterford	FitzGerald Stadium, Killarney
14:00	P Lucid (0-4f), S Nolan (0-3f), J Goulding (0-1).	Report	M Shanahan (0-9, 7f, 1pen), J Dillon (0-2), A Gleeson (0-2), P Curran (0-2), C Dunford (0-2).	Attendance: 500 est. Referee: J Mullins

Final

23 January 2016 Final	Limerick	0-17 – 0-18	Clare	Gaelic Grounds, Limerick
19:30	D Hannon 0-7 (3f); B Nash 0-4; P Browne, C Lynch 0-2 each; D O'Donovan, P Ryan 0-1 each.	Report	C Ryan 0-5 (2f); B Duggan, P Duggan 0-3 each; J Conlon, C O'Connell 0-2 each; C Dillon, D Fitzgerald, C Cleary 0-1 each.	Attendance: 4,853; Referee: N Wall (Cork)

== League statistics ==
=== General ===
- First goal of the championship:
  - David Reidy for Limerick against Kerry (3 January 2016)
- Widest winning margin: 25 points
  - Clare 2-27 – 0-8 Kerry (13 January 2016)
- Most goals in a match: 4
  - Waterford 1-17 – 3-16 Limerick (19 January 2016)
- Most points in a match: 41
  - Limerick 2-23 – 0-18 Kerry (3 January 2016)
- Most goals by one team in a match: 3
  - Limerick 3-16 - 1-17 Waterford (19 January 2016)
- Highest aggregate score: 47
  - Limerick 2-23 – 0-18 Kerry (3 January 2016)
- Lowest aggregate score: 31
  - Clare 1-14 - 1-14 Cork (3 January 2016)
- Most goals scored by a losing team: 1
  - Waterford 1-9 – 1-20 Clare (17 January 2016)
  - Waterford 1-17 – 3-16 Limerick (19 January 2016)

=== Scoring ===
Overall

Rank	Player	County	Tally	Total	Matches	Average
1	Declan Hannon	Limerick	1-21	24	3	8.00
2	Colin Ryan	Cork	0-20	20	4	5.00
3	David Reidy	Limerick	2-10	16	3	5.33
3	Shane Nolan	Kerry	0-16	16	4	4.00
3	Maurice Shanahan	Waterford	0-16	16	2	8.00
6	Pa Cronin	Cork	1-12	15	2	7.50
7	Paudie O'Sullivan	Cork	0-14	14	3	4.66
8	Peter Duggan	Clare	2-6	12	4	3.00
8	John Conlon	Clare	0-12	12	4	3.00
10	Luke O'Farrell	Cork	1-6	9	2	4.50
10	Tom Morrissey	Limerick	1-6	9	3	3.00
10	Thomas Ryan	Waterford	0-9	9	2	4.50
10	Conor Lehane	Cork	0-9	9	2	4.50

Single game

Rank	Player	County	Tally	Total	Opposition
1	Declan Hannon	Limerick	1-9	12	Cork
2	Pa Cronin	Cork	1-8	11	Waterford
3	Maurice Shanahan	Waterford	0-9	9	Kerry
4	Peter Duggan	Clare	2-2	8	Kerry
4	David Reidy	Limerick	1-5	8	Waterford
4	Colin Ryan	Clare	0-8	8	Kerry
4	Shane Nolan	Kerry	0-8	8	Limerick
8	David Reidy	Limerick	1-4	7	Kerry
8	Paudie O'Sullivan	Cork	0-7	7	Clare
8	Declan Hannon	Limerick	0-7	7	Clare
8	Thomas Ryan	Waterford	0-7	7	Clare
8	Paudie O'Sullivan	Cork	0-7	7	Limerick
8	Colin Ryan	Clare	0-7	7	Waterford
8	Maurice Shanahan	Waterford	0-7	7	Limerick
8	Declan Hannon	Limerick	0-7	7	Clare

Clean sheets

Rank	Goalkeeper	County	Clean sheets
1	Nicky Quaid	Limerick	2
1	Andrew Fahy	Clare	2
3	Ian O'Regan	Waterford	1
3	Donal Tuohy	Clare	1
3	Declan Dalton	Cork	1
3	Anthony Nash	Cork	1
3	Aidan McCabe	Kerry	1

=== Miscellaneous ===
- Initially intended to be a final group game, with Limerick and Clare already through to the final of the competition it was decided to double this fixture up as the final. Both sides advanced having won each of their three group games.
