= Barry Nash =

Irish hurler

Personal information
- Native name: Barra de Nais (Irish)
- Born: 31 December 1996 (age 29) Limerick, Ireland
- Occupation: Aviation Services Project Lead
- Height: 6 ft 2 in (188 cm)

Sport
- Sport: Hurling
- Position: Left corner-back
Club
- Years: Club
- South Liberties
Club titles
- Limerick titles: 0
College
- Years: College
- University of Limerick
Inter-county*
Years	County	Apps (scores)
2016–present	Limerick	52 (0–27)
Inter-county titles
- Munster titles: 7
- All-Irelands: 6
- NHL: 4
- All Stars: 3
- *Inter County team apps and scores correct as of 23:00, 30 October 2026.

Barry Nash (born 31 December 1996) is an Irish hurler who plays as a left corner-back for the Limerick senior team.

== Playing career ==
=== South Liberties ===
Nash joined th South Liberties club at a young age and played in all grades at juvenile and underage levels before joining the club's senior team.

=== Limerick ===
==== Minor and under-21 ====
Nash first played for Limerick as a member of the county's minor team. On 23 July 2013, he scored three points from play when Limerick won their first Munster Championship title in 29 years after a 1–20 to 4–08 defeat of Waterford in a replay of the final.

Nash was eligible for the minor team again in 2014 and won a second successive Munster Championship medal after a 0–24 to 0–18 second successive defeat of Waterford in a replay of the final. On 7 September 2014, Nash scored two points in Limerick's 2–17 to 0–19 All-Ireland final defeat by Kilkenny.

On 30 July 2015, Nash won a Munster Championship medal with the Limerick under-21 team after a 0–22 to 0–19 win over Clare in the final. On 12 September 2015, he was named man of the match when Limerick defeated Wexford by 0–26 to 1–07 in the All-Ireland final.

After surrendering their title in 2016, Nash won a second Munster Championship medal the following year after a 0–16 to 1–11 defeat of Cork in the final. On 9 September 2017, Nash was at left corner-forward in Limerick's 0–17 to 0–11 defeat of Kilkenny in the All-Ireland final.

==== Senior ====
Nash was drafted onto the Limerick senior hurling team in January 2016. He made his first appearance for the team in a 2–23 to 0–15 defeat of Wexford in the National Hurling League on 13 February 2016. Later that season, Nash made his first Munster Championship appearance in a 3–12 to 1–16 defeat by Tipperary.

On 6 February 2017, it was announced that Nash had withdrawn from the Limerick senior hurling panel for "personal reasons". Team manager John Kiely stated: "It is what it is. I have no doubt Barry will have a major part to play in the years ahead, who knows, maybe even at some point later this year, he may find himself in a position to return to training." Just over a month after leaving the panel, Nash returned to training.

On 19 August 2018, Nash was a non-playing substitute when Limerick won their first All-Ireland title in 45 years after a 3–16 to 2–18 defeat of Galway in the final.

On 31 March 2019, Nash was named on the bench for Limerick's National League final meeting with Waterford at Croke Park. He collected a winners' medal as a non-playing substitute in the 1–24 to 0–19 victory. On 30 June 2019, Nash won a Munster Championship medal after coming on as a 70th-minute substitute for Declan Hannon in Limerick's 2–26 to 2–14 defeat of Tipperary in the final.

On 25 October 2020, Nash won a second successive National League medal after Limerick's 0–36 to 1–23 win over Clare in the delayed final. Later that season he claimed a second successive Munster Championship medal after lining out at left corner-back in the 0–25 to 0–21 Munster final defeat of Waterford.

== Career statistics ==
As of match played 19 July 2026.

Team	Year	National League			Munster		All-Ireland		Total	
Team	Year	Division	Apps	Score	Apps	Score	Apps	Score	Apps	Score
Limerick	2016	Division 1B	7	2–12	1	0-01	2	0-00	10	2–13
Limerick	2017	Division 1B	3	0-02	1	0-01	1	0-01	5	0-04
Limerick	2018	Division 1B	1	0-01	2	0-00	2	0-02	5	0-03
Limerick	2019	Division 1A	2	0-00	1	0-01	1	0-01	4	0-02
Limerick	2020	Division 1A	5	0-02	3	0-00	2	0-01	10	0–02
Limerick	2021	Division 1A	5	0-01	2	0-00	2	0-01	9	0-02
	2022	Division 1A	4	1-01	5	0-03	2	0-01	11	1-05
	2023		4	1-02	5	0-02	2	0-01	11	1-05
	2024		4	0-00	5	0-01	0	0-00	9	0-01
	2025		4	0-04	5	0-04	1	0-01	10	0-09
	2026		4	0-00	5	0-04	2	0-02	11	0-06
Total			43	4–25	35	0–17	17	0-10	95	4–52

== Honours ==
Limerick

- All-Ireland Senior Hurling Championship: 2018, 2020, 2021, 2022, 2023
- Munster Senior Hurling Championship: 2019, 2020, 2021, 2022, 2023
- National Hurling League: 2019, 2020, 2023
- All-Ireland Under-21 Hurling Championship (2): 2015, 2017
- Munster Under-21 Hurling Championship (2): 2015, 2017
- Munster Minor Hurling Championship (2): 2013, 2014

Awards

- The Sunday Game Team of the Year (2): 2021, 2022
- GAA GPA All Stars Awards: 2021, 2022, 2026
