= Stephen Bennett (hurler) =

Irish hurler (born 1995)

Personal information
- Native name: Stiofán Mac Beinéid (Irish)
- Born: 8 October 1995 (age 31) Ballysaggart, County Waterford, Ireland
- Occupation: Primary Teacher
- Height: 6 ft 1 in (185 cm)

Sport
- Sport: Hurling
- Position: Full-forward
Club
- Years: Club
- Ballysaggart
Club titles
- Waterford titles: 0
College
- Years: College
- 2013-2017: University of Limerick
College titles
- Fitzgibbon titles: 1
Inter-county*
Years	County	Apps (scores)
2014-present	Waterford	45 (16-239)
Inter-county titles
- Munster titles: 0
- All-Irelands: 0
- NHL: 2
- All Stars: 1
- *Inter County team apps and scores correct as of match played 4 May 2026.

Stephen Bennett (born 8 October 1995) is an Irish hurler who plays for Waterford Intermediate Championship club Ballysaggart and at inter-county level with the Waterford senior hurling team. He usually lines out as a full-forward.

== Playing career ==
=== Blackwater Community School ===
Bennett first came to prominence as a hurler with Blackwater Community School in Lismore. He played in every grade of hurling and enjoyed some success. On 23 November 2011, Bennett scored ten points for Blackwater CS in their 0–11 to 0–08 defeat of Dungarvan Community School to win the Dean Ryan Cup. He also spent four years with the Blackwater CS senior hurling team in the Dr. Harty Cup.

=== University of Limerick ===
During his studies at the University of Limerick, Bennett was selected for the college's senior hurling team. On 11 March 2015, he came on as a substitute and won a Fitzgibbon Cup medal as UL defeated the Waterford Institute of Technology by 2–18 to 1–14 in a replay of the final at Páirc Uí Rinn.

=== Ballysaggart ===
Bennett first played hurling at juvenile and underage levels with Naomh Carthach, an amalgamation of Ballysaggart and Lismore. He eventually joined Ballysaggart's top adult team.

On 27 October 2013, he scored 1-12 when Ballysaggart defeated Tramore by 1–18 to 1–09 to win the Waterford Junior Championship. On 8 December, he lined out at full-forward against Feenagh-Kilmeedy in the final of the Munster Championship. He top scored with 1-07 and collected a winners' medal after the 3–12 to 0–15 victory. On 8 February 2014, Ballysaggart faced Creggan Kickhams in the All-Ireland final. Bennett top scored with 2–07 in the 5–12 to 2–21 draw. The replay on 15 February saw Bennett score 1–01 in the 1–07 to 1–11 defeat for Ballysaggart.

=== Waterford ===
==== Minor and under-21 ====
Bennett first played for Waterford when he was selected for the minor team in advance of the 2012 Munster Championship. He made his first appearance on 2 May when he scored seven points in a 1–20 to 3-13 extra-time defeat by Clare. Waterford's championship ended with a defeat by Tipperary at the semi-final stage, however, Bennett ended the season as Waterford's top scorer with 0–12.

Bennett was eligible for the minor grade again the following year. On 23 July 2013, he scored 3-02 when Waterford suffered a 1–20 to 4–08 defeat by Limerick in the Munster Championship final. On 8 September, Bennett lined out at right wing-forward when Waterford faced Galway in the All-Ireland final. He scored four points from play in the 1–21 to 0–16 victory.

After progressing onto the Waterford under-21 team, Bennett made his first appearance for the team on 16 July 2014. He scored a point after coming on as a substitute in a 3–18 to 0–16 defeat by Cork.

On 27 July 2016, Bennett lined out in his first Munster Championship final. He scored 1-01 from right corner-forward in the 2–19 to 0–15 defeat of Tipperary. On 10 September, Bennett was moved to full-forward for the All-Ireland final against Galway. He scored two goals in the 5–15 to 0–14 victory and collected a winners' medal in what was his last game in the grade. Bennett ended the season by being named Player of the Year.

==== Senior ====
Bennett was just 18-years-old when he was added to the Waterford senior team. He made his first appearance on 19 July 2014 when he came on as a 62nd-minute substitute for Liam Lawlor in a 3–15 to 2–15 defeat by Wexford.

On 3 May 2015, Bennett was a late change to the Waterford team that faced Cork in the 2015 National League final. He scored a point from left corner-forward and collected a winners' medal after the 1–24 to 0–17 victory. On 12 July 2015, Bennett lined out at right corner-forward in the Munster Championship final but was substituted by his brother Shane in the 0–21 to 0–16 defeat.

In November 2015, it was announced that Bennett would miss the 2016 National Hurling League after undergoing two hip operations. He made his return to the Waterford team on 5 June 2016 when he came on as a late substitute for Michael Walsh in a 1–21 to 0–17 defeat of Clare. On 10 July, Bennett was an unused substitute when Waterford suffered a 5–19 to 0–13 defeat by Tipperary in the Munster Championship final.

On 3 September 2017, Bennett was an unused substitute when Waterford faced Galway in the All-Ireland final. Waterford eventually lost the game by 0–26 to 2–17.

== Career statistics ==
As of (Championship statistics only) 19 May 2025

Team	Year	National League			Munster		All-Ireland		Total	
Team	Year	Division	Apps	Score	Apps	Score	Apps	Score	Apps	Score
Waterford	2014	Division 1A	0	0-00	0	0-00	1	0-00	1	0-00
Waterford	2015	Division 1B	4	0-00	2	0-02	2	0-00	8	0-02
Waterford	2016	Division 1A	0	0-00	1	0-00	2	0-00	3	0-00
Waterford	2017	Division 1A	5	2-07	1	0-01	2	0-00	8	2-08
Waterford	2018	Division 1A	4	0-07	4	0-04	—		8	0-11
Waterford	2019	Division 1A	8	4-85	4	1-21	—		12	5-106
Waterford	2020	Division 1B	5	3-24	2	0-24	2	1-20	9	4-68
Waterford	2021	Division 1B	4	1-43	1	0-12	4	2-28	9	3-83
Waterford	2022	Division 1B	5	8-51	4	1-29	—		9	9-80
Waterford	2023	Division 1B	1	2-07	4	0-37	—		5	2-44
Waterford	2024	Division 1B			4	4-13	—		4	4-13
Waterford	2025	Division 1B			3	3-26			3	3-26
Career total			36	20-224	30	9-169	13	3-48	80	31-441

== Honours ==
Blackwater Community School

- Dean Ryan Cup: 2011

University of Limerick

- Fitzgibbon Cup: 2015

Ballysaggart

- Waterford Intermediate Hurling Championship: 2019
- Munster Junior Club Hurling Championship: 2013
- Waterford Junior Hurling Championship: 2013

Waterford

- National Hurling League: 2015, 2022
- All-Ireland Under-21 Hurling Championship: 2016
- Munster Under-21 Hurling Championship: 2016
- All-Ireland Minor Hurling Championship: 2013

Awards

- All-Star Award: 2020
- All-Ireland Senior Hurling Championship Top Scorer: 2020

Sporting positions
Preceded by Pauric Mahony	Waterford Senior Hurling Captain; 2021	Incumbent
Awards
Preceded by Richie English	All-Ireland Under-21 Hurling Championship; Player of the Year; 2016	Succeeded by Aaron Gillane
