= David Reidy (Limerick hurler) =

Irish hurler

Personal information
- Native name: Daithí Ó Riada (Irish)
- Born: 30 June 1993 (age 33) Athlacca, County Limerick, Ireland
- Occupation: Primary school teacher

Sport
- Sport: Hurling
- Position: Right wing-forward
Club
- Years: Club
- Dromin-Athlacca
Club titles
- Limerick titles: 0
College
- Years: College
- Mary Immaculate College
College titles
- Fitzgibbon titles: 1
Inter-county*
Years	County	Apps (scores)
2013-2016 2017 2018-	Limerick; Kildare; Limerick	2 (0-01); 2 (0-24); 47(0-40)
Inter-county titles
- Munster titles: 8
- All-Irelands: 6
- NHL: 4
- All Stars: 0
- *Inter County team apps and scores correct as of 23:09, 19 July 2026.

David Reidy (born 30 June 1993) is an Irish hurler who plays for Limerick Intermediate Championship club Dromin-Athlacca and at inter-county level with the Limerick senior hurling team. He usually lines out as a right wing-forward.

== Playing career ==
=== Mary Immaculate College ===
During his studies at Mary Immaculate College, Reidy was selected for the college's senior hurling team during his second year. On 27 February 2016, he won a Fitzgibbon Cup medal when Mary Immaculate College won their first ever title after a 1–30 to 3–22 defeat of the University of Limerick.

=== Dromin-Athlacca ===
Reidy joined the Dromin-Athlacca club at a young age and played in all grades at juvenile and underage levels before eventually joining the club's top adult team in the Limerick Intermediate Championship.

On 15 October 2013, Reidy lined out at centre-forward when Dromin-Athlacca faced Knockaderry in the Limerick Intermediate Championship final. He scored 1-02, including a point from a free, and collected a winners' medal following a 2–18 to 1–15 victory.

On 27 October 2018, Reidy lined out in a second Limerick Intermediate Championship final. He top scored for Dromin-Athlacca with 0-09 and collected a second winners' medal following a 2–15 to 0–14 defeat of Croom.

=== Limerick ===
==== Minor and under-21 ====
Reidy first played for Limerick as a member of the minor team during the 2011 Munster Championship. He made his first appearance for the team on 27 April 2011 when he lined out at right wing-forward in a 2–14 to 0–12 defeat of Cork.

Reidy was drafted onto the Limerick under-21 team for the 2013 Munster Championship. He made his only appearance in the grade on 31 May 2013 when he scored a point from left wing-forward in a 2–18 to 2–11 defeat by Tipperary.

==== Senior ====
Reidy was just 19-year-old when he was added to the Limerick panel for the 2013 National League. On 14 July 2013, he won a Munster Championship medal as a non-playing substitute following a 0–24 to 0–15 defeat of Cork in the Munster final.

On 23 February 2014, Reidy made his first appearance for the Limerick senior team when he came on as a 21st-minute substitute for Donal O'Grady and scored a goal in a 3–26 to 0–12 defeat of Antrim in the National League. On 3 July 2014, he was an unused substitute when Limerick suffered a 2–24 to 0–24 defeat by Cork in the Munster final.

=== Kildare ===
In January 2017, Reidy transferred to the Kildare senior hurling team. He made his first appearance for the team on 12 February 2017 and scored 0–06 in a 1–18 to 1–15 defeat of Armagh in the National League. Reidy ended the league as Kildare's top scorer with 2–42 in five games. He was also top scorer in Kildare's Christy Ring Cup campaign with 0-24.

=== Limerick return ===
In November 2017, it was announced that Reidy was returning to the Limerick senior hurling team. On 19 August 2018, he was an unused substitute when Limerick won their first All-Ireland title in 45 years after a 3–16 to 2–18 defeat of Galway in the final.

On 31 March 2019, Reidy was a member of the extended panel but failed to make the match-day panel when Limerick defeated Waterford by 1–24 to 0–19 to win the National League title. On 30 June 2019, he won a second Munster Championship medal after coming on as a substitute for Tom Morrissey in Limerick's 2–26 to 2–14 defeat of Tipperary in the final.

== Career statistics ==
As of match played 19 July 2026.

Team	Year	National League			Ring Cup		Munster		All-Ireland		Total	
Team	Year	Division	Apps	Score	Apps	Score	Apps	Score	Apps	Score	Apps	Score
Limerick	2013	Division 1B	0	0-00	—		0	0-00	0	0-00	0	0-00
Limerick	2014	Division 1B	5	1-05	—		0	0-00	0	0-00	5	1-05
Limerick	2015	Division 1B	6	2-11	—		1	0-00	0	0-00	7	2-11
Limerick	2016	Division 1B	4	0-05	—		0	0-00	1	0-01	5	0-06
Kildare	2017	Division 2A	5	2-42	2	0-24	—		—		7	2-66
Limerick	2018	Division 1B	7	0-15	—		0	0-00	1	0-01	8	0-16
Limerick	2019	Division 1A	1	0-00	—		3	0-01	1	0-01	5	0-02
Limerick	2020	Division 1A	6	0-16	—		3	0-01	2	0-00	11	0-17
Limerick	2021	Division 1A	2	0-15	-		2	0-02	2	0-01	6	0-18
	2022	Division 1A	5	0-06	-		6	0-09	2	0-03	13	0-18
	2023		2	0-08	-		5	0-03	2	0-03	9	0-14
	2024		4	0-07	-		5	0-08	1	0-03	10	0-18
	2025		5	0-14	-		5	0-04	1	0-00	11	0-18
	2026		6	0-06	-		5	0-00	2	0-01	13	0-07
Career total			58	5-150	4	0-24	33	0-27	15	0-14	109	5-212

== Honours ==
Mary Immaculate College

- Fitzgibbon Cup (1): 2016

Dromin-Athlacca

- Limerick Intermediate Hurling Championship (2): 2013, 2018

Limerick

- All-Ireland Senior Hurling Championship (6): 2018, 2020, 2021, 2022, 2023, 2026
- Munster Senior Hurling Championship (8): 2013, 2019, 2020, 2021, 2022, 2023, 2024, 2026
- National Hurling League (4): 2019, 2020, 2023, 2026
