= John Kiely (Limerick hurler) =

Limerick hurler and manager

Personal information
- Native name: Seán Ó Cadhla (Irish)
- Born: Galbally, County Limerick, Ireland
- Height: 6 ft 0 in (183 cm)

Sport
- Sport: Hurling
- Position: Right corner-back
Clubs
- Years: Club
- Garryspillane; Galbally
Club titles
	Football	Hurling
Limerick titles	2	1
College
- Years: College
- University College Cork
College titles
- Fitzgibbon titles: 0
Inter-county*
Years	County	Apps (scores)
1994-1996	Limerick	0 (0-00)
Inter-county titles
- Munster titles: 1
- All-Irelands: 0
- NHL: 0
- All Stars: 0
- *Inter County team apps and scores correct as of 14:55, 15 September 2016.

John Kiely is an Irish hurling manager and former selector, Gaelic footballer and hurler. He has been manager of the Limerick senior hurling team since 2016. He is widely considered to be one of the greatest Hurling managers of all time.

Born in Galbally, County Limerick, Kiely first played competitive hurling and Gaelic football in his youth. After beginning his club career at juvenile and underage levels, he later became a dual player at senior level with the Galbally and Garryspillane teams. Kiely won a total of three championship medals across both codes.

He was principal of The Abbey, a secondary school in Tipperary Town for 10 years, before taking up the role of deputy principal in 2023. He took a one-year career break from his role as deputy principal in 2024.

In October 2024, Kiely started to work at JP McManus' Martinstown Stud in Co. Limerick. While on a leave of absence from his vice-principal job at the Abbey School in Tipperary town.

== Career ==
Kiely made his debut on the inter-county scene at the age of seventeen when he joined the Limerick minor hurling team. After little success in this grade he later joined the under-21 team, also without championship success. Kiely was a member of the extended Limerick panel in 1994 before later winning a Munster medal as a non-playing substitute in 1996. He later captained the Limerick senior football team.

== Management and coaching career ==
=== Limerick intermediate manager ===
After Limerick's 6-19 to 2-07 All-Ireland semi-final defeat by Tipperary in 2009, Kiely was prompted to become involved in inter-county team management with Limerick. "I rang [County Board chairman] Liam Lenihan the next day to tell him I wanted to get involved and help out at any level." Kiely was later named as the new manager of the Limerick intermediate hurling team. In his first season with the team, Limerick were beaten by eventual Munster Championship winners Cork after extra-time in the semi-final. The following year, Kiely's side lost out by two points to eventual All-Ireland champions Clare in the Munster final.

=== Limerick under-21 selector ===
In 2011, Kiely combined his role as intermediate manager with that of a selector with Leo O'Connor's Limerick under-21 team. On 3 August 2011, he was part of the management team that guided Limerick to a 4-20 to 1-27 extra-time defeat of Cork in the final of the Munster Championship.

=== Limerick senior selector ===
After John Allen's appointment as manager of the Limerick senior team in October 2012, Kiely was chosen to be part of the new management team as a selector. His first season as a selector ended with Limerick failing to secure promotion from Division 1B of the National Hurling League before exiting the championship after a quarter-final defeat by Kilkenny.

Limerick once again failed to secure promotion from Division 1B in Kiely's second season as a selector. On 14 July 2013, he was a selector when Limerick defeated Cork by 0-24 to 0-15 to win the Munster Championship. The management team stepped down at the end of the season.

=== Limerick under-21 manager ===
On 18 September 2014, Kiely was appointed manager of the Limerick under-21 team in succession to Ciarán Carey. He subsequently guided the team to the Munster Championship title after a 0-22 to 0-19 win over Clare in the final. On 12 September 2015, Kiely was in charge when Limerick defeated Wexford by 0-26 to 1-07 in the All-Ireland final. He ended the season by being named Manager of the Year by the Munster Council.

Kiely's second season as manager of the Limerick under-21 team ended with a 2-12 to 1-13 Munster semi-final defeat by Tipperary.

=== Limerick senior manager ===
Kiely was named as the new manager of the Limerick senior team after a meeting of the County Board on 14 September 2016. In his first season in charge, Limerick reached the semi-finals of the National League, losing by 1-11 to 1-21 to eventual champions Galway. Kiely's side were later beaten by Clare in the Munster Championship, before exiting the All-Ireland Championship following a three-point defeat by Kilkenny.

In his second season in charge, Kiely's side secured promotion to Division 1A of the National League after securing maximum points in their five group stage games. Limerick later narrowly missed out on a place in the Munster final, but their third-place finish in the new Munster Championship group stage allowed Limerick to qualify for the All-Ireland Championship. Subsequent defeats of Carlow, Kilkenny and Cork secured a place in the All-Ireland final. On 19 August 2018, Kiely guided Limerick to their first All-Ireland title in 45 years after a 3-16 to 2-18 victory over Galway in the final.

On 31 March 2019, Kiely guided Limerick to a first National League final appearance since 2005. A 1-24 to 0-19 defeat of Waterford secured a first league title for Limerick since 1997. In Munster, Limerick qualified for the Munster Final against Tipperary. The All Ireland Semi-Final saw Limerick face Kilkenny. Limerick were favourites but struggled as Kilkenny took a commanding lead and while Limerick fought back to reduce the lead to a point, they lost by the minimum and went out of the championship.

Limerick were hotly tipped to win back the All-Ireland in 2020. When the championship started in October, having been postponed due to the COVID-19 pandemic, Limerick retained their Munster title by defeating Waterford in the final. Victory over Galway put Kiely's team into a second All-Ireland final in three years. Again they faced Waterford and went on to win on a scoreline of 0-30 to 0-19. This victory gave them back the All-Ireland crown and also ensured that Kiely's Limerick side went through all competitions in 2020 unbeaten. In 2021, Limerick surrendered their league crown but went on to retain the Munster title following a dramatic comeback against Tipperary in the final, with Kiely's side coming back from ten points down to win by five. Victory over Waterford put Limerick into a second consecutive All-Ireland final. In the All-Ireland final Limerick defeated Cork on a scoreline of 3-32 to 1-22. With that victory Limerick retained the All-Ireland for the first time in their history and marked the highest winning score ever achieved in an All-Ireland Hurling final.

2022 saw Limerick set out to capture three-in-a-row. After going through the Munster round robin unbeaten, Limerick beat Clare in the Munster final after extra time. On 3 July, Limerick defeated Galway in the All-Ireland Semi-Final by 0-27 to 1-21 to get back to the final. The final played on 18 July saw Limerick face Kilkenny. Limerick won the game by 1-31 to 2-26 to claim their fourth title in five years and their first ever three-in-a-row.

2023 saw Limerick try to equal Cork and Kilkenny's record by winning 4 in a row. From the start of the year, Limerick laid out their intentions by winning the League final against Kilkenny. On the 29th April, Limerick's unbeaten run in the Championship came to an end when Clare defeated them in The Munster Round Robin at the Gaelic Grounds by 1-24 to 2-20. However they met again in the Munster Final and Limerick turned the tables on them by winning by a single point, 1-23 to 1-22, giving Kiely's side a fifth Munster title in a row. After a win over Galway in the All Ireland Semi Final, Limerick faced Kilkenny in the final for the second year in a row. While Limerick struggled in the first half, they trailed by only a goal at half time. The second half saw Limerick take complete control as they outscored the Cats by 0-21 to 1-06, eventually winning by 0-30 to 2-15 to win the four in a row, becoming only the third team ever to accomplish it.

In September 2024, Kiely signed on for another two years as Limerick manager.

On July 19th 2026, Kiely led Limerick to a 6th All-Ireland title since taking over in 2016, cementing both himself and the team as one of the greatest of all time.

== Managerial statistics ==
As of match played 13 December 2020.

Managerial league-championship record by team and tenure
Team	From	To	Record				
Team	From	To	P	W	D	L	Win %
Limerick	14 September 2016	Present	49	36	2	11	73.5

== Honours ==
=== As a player ===
Galbally

- Limerick Senior Football Championship (2): 1994, 1997
- Limerick Junior B Hurling Championship: 1995

Garryspillane

- Limerick Senior Hurling Championship (1): 2005

Limerick

- Munster Senior Hurling Championship (1): 1996
- All-Ireland Intermediate Hurling Championship (1): 1998
- Munster Intermediate Hurling Championship (1): 1998

=== In management ===
Limerick

- All-Ireland Senior Hurling Championship (6): 2018, 2020, 2021, 2022, 2023, 2026
- Munster Senior Hurling Championship (8): 2013, 2019, 2020, 2021, 2022, 2023, 2024, 2026
- National Hurling League (4): 2019, 2020, 2023, 2026
- Munster Senior Hurling League (2): 2018, 2020, 2026
- All-Ireland Under-21 Hurling Championship (1): 2015
- Munster Under-21 Hurling Championship (1): 2011, 2015

Individual

- RTÉ Sports Manager of the Year Award (1): 2020

Sporting positions
Preceded by Ed Walsh	Limerick Senior Football Captain; 1998	Succeeded by
Preceded by Jerry Molyneaux	Limerick Intermediate Hurling Manager; 2009–2011	Succeeded by Natal O'Grady
Preceded by Ciarán Carey	Limerick Under-21 Hurling Manager; 2014–2016	Succeeded by Pat Donnelly
Preceded by T. J. Ryan	Limerick Senior Hurling Manager; 2016-present	Succeeded by Incumbent
Achievements
Preceded by Donal Moloney; Gerry O'Connor	All-Ireland Under-21 HC winning manager 2015	Succeeded by Seán Power
Preceded by Micheál Donoghue	All-Ireland SHC winning manager 2018	Succeeded by Liam Sheedy
Preceded by Liam Sheedy	All-Ireland SHC winning manager 2020–2021	Succeeded by Incumbent
