= 2025 Limerick Senior Hurling Championship =

Annual hurling competition in Limerick

- Dates: 31 July – 19 October 2025
- Teams: 12
- Sponsor: Whitebox Developments
- Champions: Na Piarsaigh (9th title); Jerome Boylan (captain); Shane O'Neill (manager)
- Runners-up: Doon; Darragh O'Donovan (captain); Derek McGrath (manager)
- Relegated: Dromin/Athlacca

Tournament statistics
- Matches played: 35
- Goals scored: 87 (2.49 per match)
- Points scored: 1265 (36.14 per match)
- Top scorer(s): Shane O'Brien (4–59); Aidan O'Connor (2–65)

The 2025 Limerick Senior Hurling Championship was the 131st staging of the Limerick Senior Hurling Championship since its establishment by the Limerick County Board in 1887. The draws for the group stage placings took place on 21 January 2025. The championship ran from 31 July to 19 October 2025.

Doon entered the championship as the defending champions. Newcastle West returned to the top tier for the first time since 1990. Dromin/Athlacca's relegation brought an end to two years of top tier hurling for the club.

The final was played on 19 October 2025 at the TUS Gaelic Grounds in Limerick, between Na Piarsaigh and Doon, in what was their fourth meeting overall in the final and a second consecutive meeting in the final. Na Piarsaigh won the match by 2–25 to 2–18 to claim their ninth championship title overall and a first title in two years.

Kilmallock's Shane O'Brien (4–59 and Ballybrown's Aidan O'Connor (2–65) were the championship's top scorers.

== New sponsorship ==
Property development company Whitebox Developments became the new sponsor of the competition.

== Team changes ==
=== To Championship ===
Promoted from the Limerick Premier Intermediate Hurling Championship

- Newcastle West

=== From Championship ===
Relegated to the Limerick Premier Intermediate Hurling Championship

- South Liberties

== Group 1 ==
=== Group 1 table ===
Semi-finalists Quarter-finalists Relegated

| Team | Matches | | | | Score | | | Pts |
| Team | Pld | W | D | L | For | Against | Diff | Pts |
|---|---|---|---|---|---|---|---|---|
| Na Piarsaigh | 5 | 4 | 1 | 0 | 135 | 88 | 47 | 9 |
| Doon | 5 | 3 | 2 | 0 | 125 | 104 | 21 | 8 |
| Ballybrown | 5 | 3 | 0 | 2 | 124 | 110 | 14 | 6 |
| Kilmallock | 5 | 1 | 2 | 2 | 102 | 119 | −17 | 4 |
| Ahane | 5 | 1 | 1 | 3 | 105 | 125 | −20 | 3 |
| Patrickswell | 5 | 0 | 0 | 5 | 87 | 132 | −45 | 0 |

=== Group 1 results ===
| 31 July 2025 Round 1 | Kilmallock | 0–23 – 0–18 | Patrickswell | Newcastle West Grounds |
| | S O’Brien (0–10, 4f), O O’Reilly (0–3), C Staunton and P O’Reilly (0–2 each), S Quirke, C Hanley-Clarke (0–1, 1f), G Enright, D Woulfe, P Connery (1f) and K O’Donnell (0–1 each). | Report | A Gillane (0–12, 10f), D Byrnes (0–5, 4f), J Higgins (0–1). |

| 2 August 2025 Round 1 | Ballybrown | 5–18 – 1–23 | Ahane | Childers Road |
| | A O’Connor 1–6; B Griffin, Barry Adams 2–1 each; R Kenny, R Griffin, L Doolan 0–2; B Smith, D Hall, J Adams, M Kiely 0–1 each. | Report | T Morrissey 0–12 (9 frees); C Barry 1–2; J O’Connor 0–4; J Cosgrove 0–3; C Ryan 0–2. |

| 2 August 2025 Round 1 | Doon | 1–19 – 2–16 | Na Piarsaigh | FitzGerald Park |
| | A English 1–7 (all frees); D O’Donovan 0–3 (0–2 frees); J Ryan, P Ryan, C Thomas 0–2 each; B Murphy, G Thomas, D Coughlan 0–1 each. | Report | K Downes 1–7 (0–5f); K Dempsey 1–2; W Henn 0–2; JJ Carey, D Dempsey, J Finn, D Lynch 0–1 each. |

| 7 August 2025 Round 2 | Patrickswell | 0–14 – 3–23 | Doon | FitzGerald Park |
| | A Gillane 0–5 (4f); D Byrnes 0–3 (3f); J Murray (0–2); J Higgins, J Kelleher, K O’Brien, M Carmody (0–1 apiece). | Report | G Thomas (0–7) A English (0–7, 0-4f, 0–1 65); C Thomas (1–2); K Maher (1–1); P Ryan (1–1); D Coughlan (0–3); R English, D O’Donovan (0–1 apiece). |

| 8 August 2025 Round 2 | Ahane | 0–18 – 1–15 | Kilmallock | Doon Grounds |
| | T Morrissey (0–10, 0–7 frees); J O’Connor (0–3); J Cosgrove (0–3); R Fox, C Barry (0–1 each). | Report | Shane O’Brien (1–7, 0–5 frees); P O’Reilly (0–2); D Woulfe, S Quirke, R Egan, G Mulcahy, C Hanley Clarke (free), C Staunton (0–1 each). |

| 8 August 2025 Round 2 | Na Piarsaigh | 0–21 – 1–10 | Ballybrown | Childers Road |
| | K Downes (0–8, 6f), R Lynch (0–4, 4f), JJ Carey and K Dempsey (0–3 each), A Breen (0–2), M Foley (0–1). | Report | A O’Connor (1–9, 8f, 1 ’65), D Hall (0–1). |

| 21 August 2025 Round 3 | Doon | 0–22 – 2–16 | Kilmallock | Knocklong Sportsfield |
| | A English 0–13 (9f), B Murphy and E Stokes 0–2 each, G Thomas, P Ryan, R English, D O’Donovan and J Ryan 0–1 each. | Report | K Hayes and O O’Reilly 1–2 each, S O’Brien 0–4 (3f, 1’65), C Hanley-Clarke 0–3 (3f), G Enright 0–2, C Staunton, G Mulcahy and D O’Brien 0–1 each. |

| 23 August 2025 Round 3 | Patrickswell | 2–09 – 1–18 | Ballybrown | Mick Neville Park |
| | T O'Brien 1–0, D Byrnes (1–0, 1–0 free), J Kelleher (0–2, 0–1 free), C Fitzgerald, C Lynch 0–2 each, P Kirby (0–1, 0–1 free), K O'Brien, M Carmody 0–1 each. | Report | A O'Connor (0–10, 0–4 frees, 0–1 65); R Griffin 1–1, K Gavin and L Doolan 0–2 each, M Kiely, J Adams and C Coughlan 0–1 each. |

| 24 August 2025 Round 3 | Na Piarsaigh | 2–25 – 1–13 | Ahane | Childers Road |
| | K Downes 0–8 (5f); A Breen 1–3; R Lynch 0–5 (3f, 2 65); D Lynch 1–2; K Dempsey 0–3; T Grimes 0–2; M Foley 0–1; D Dempsey 0–1. | Report | T Morrissey 0–11 (8f); J O’Connor 1–0; D Minihan 0–1, R Fox 0–1. |

| 29 August 2025 Round 4 | Ballybrown | 2–19 – 3–17 | Doon | Fitzgerald Park |
| | A O’Connor (0–13, 8f, 1 s/l); R Kenny (1–2), B Adams (1–1), L Doolan (0–3). | Report | D Coughlan (1–2), D O’Donovan (1f), P Ryan (1–1 each), G Thomas (3f), K Maher (0–3 each), C Thomas, A English (2f), E Stokes (0–2 each), R English (0–1). |

| 29 August 2025 Round 4 | Ahane | 1–21 – 2–14 | Patrickswell | Childers Road |
| | T Morrissey 0–10 (6f), J Cosgrave 0–4, J O’Connor 1–0, R Foxe 0–3, W McCormack 0–2, M Donnellan and D Morrissey 0–1 each. | Report | J Kelleher 0–6 (4f), D Byrnes (f) and K O’Brien 1–0 each, C Lynch 0–2, T O’Brien, C Fitzgerald, M Carmody, H Maher, J Higgins and S O’Brien 0–1 each. |

| 30 August 2025 Round 4 | Kilmallock | 1–14 – 2–23 | Na Piarsaigh | Mick Neville Park |
| | S O’Brien (0–4, 4f), D Woulfe (1–0), K Hayes, C Hanley-Clarke (2f) and P Connery (0–2 each), R Hanley, P O’Brien, M Houlihan and O O’Reilly (0–1 each). | Report | K Downes (0–8, 6f, 1’65), D Lynch (1–2), S Dowling (1–0, pen), R Lynch (0–3, 2f, 1’65), P Casey and D Dempsey (0–2 each), K Dempsey, A Breen, E McEvoy, W O’Donoghue, W Henn and M Foley (0–1 each). |

| 13 September 2025 Round 5 | Patrickswell | 2-14 - 2-26 | Na Piarsaigh | Childers Road |
| | D Byrnes 0-9 (0-6f), L Fitzgerald 1-02, E Fitzgerald 1-01, M Carmody and H Maher 0-1 each. | Report | A Breen 1-07, W Henn 0-09 (0-08f), P Casey 1-01, M Foley, W Kearns, D Lynch 0-2 each, E McEvoy, R Lynch and D Dempsey 0-1 each. |

| 13 September 2025 Round 5 | Doon | 0-23 - 1-18 | Ahane | Cappamore Grounds |
| | A English 0-6 (5f), D Coleman and D O’Donovan (2f) 0-4 each, K Maher and C O’Donovan 0-2, J Ryan, A O’Connell, B Murphy, E Stokes and C Ryan 0-1 each. | Report | T Morrisey 1-13 (1-0 pen, 12f), R Fox 0-3, J Cosgrove and C Ryan 0-1 each. |

| 13 September 2025 Round 5 | Kilamllock | 1-19 - 4-20 | Ballybrown | Newcastle West Grounds |
| | S O'Brien (1-11, 0-10 frees), D Woulfe 0-3, K Hayes and T Savage 0-1 each, C Hanley Clarke (0-3, 0-3 frees). | Report | A O'Connor (0-8, 0-5 frees); R Kenny 1-3; L Doolan 1-2; M Kiely 1-1, Barry Adams 1-0, B Griffin 0-3, C Coughlan, R Griffin, J Coughlan 0-1 each. |

== Group 2 ==
=== Group 2 table ===
Promoted, quarter-finalists Quarter-finalists Relegated

| Team | Matches | | | | Score | | | Pts |
| Team | Pld | W | D | L | For | Against | Diff | Pts |
|---|---|---|---|---|---|---|---|---|
| Monaleen | 5 | 4 | 1 | 0 | 118 | 99 | 19 | 9 |
| Adare | 5 | 3 | 1 | 1 | 112 | 102 | 10 | 7 |
| Mungret/St Paul's | 5 | 2 | 2 | 1 | 111 | 101 | 10 | 6 |
| Kildimo-Pallaskenry | 5 | 1 | 1 | 2 | 94 | 100 | −6 | 4 |
| Newcastle West | 5 | 0 | 3 | 2 | 96 | 100 | −4 | 3 |
| Dromin/Athlacca | 5 | 0 | 1 | 4 | 87 | 116 | −29 | 1 |

=== Group 2 results ===
| 31 July 2025 Round 1 | Monaleen | 1–20 – 0–18 | Adare | Fedamore Grounds |
| | D O Dálaigh 1–2, M Fitzgerald 0–5 (frees), A La Touche Cosgrave 0–4, L Lyons 0–4, E O'Driscoll 0–2, L Murphy, D Ferland, E Maher 0–1 each. | Report | W Griffin 0–12 (0–5 frees, 0–2 '54s, 0–1 sideline cut), P Kearney 0–2, J Fitzgibbon (free), D Gleeson, D O'Mahoney, J Gahan 0–1 each. |

| 1 August 2025 Round 1 | Mungret/St Paul's | 1–17 – 2–14 | Newcastle West | Mick Neville Park |
| | M O’Brien 0–6 (0–3 frees); C O’Halloran 1–1; N Mulcahy 0–3; B Duff 0–3; L Lynch 0–2; L Harrington and J McCarthy 0–1 each | Report | Eoin Hurley 1–4; Cathal Hayes (0–3, 0–3 frees); Ethan Hurley (0–3, 0–2 frees); Con Hayes 1–0; M Dee and D Lyons 0–2 each |

| 2 August 2025 Round 1 | Kildimo-Pallaskenry | 3–16 – 0–18 | Dromin/Athlacca | Ballyagran Grounds |
| | R O'Farrell 1–4, P Nash 1–1, S Hartigan 0–4 (4 frees), J O'Keeffe 1–0, L Griffin 0–3 (3 frees), K Hayes, S Barry (1 '65') 0–2 each; | Report | D Reidy 0–12 (8 frees), T Boddy 0–2 (2 frees), D Breen, S O'Leary, D Scully (free), C Scully (free) 0–1 each. |

| 6 August 2025 Round 2 | Adare | 1–21 – 2–18 | Mungret/St Paul's | Ballybrown Grounds |
| | P Kearney (1–7, 0–3 frees), D Gleeson 0–4, D O'Mahony 0–3, J Hannon 0–2, J Fitzgibbon, D Hannon, R Connolly and S Connolly 0–1 each, W Griffin (0–1, 0–1 free) | Report | F Fitzgerald1-1, M O'Brien (0–9, 0–8 frees), B Giltenane 0–3, N Mulcahy 0–2, B O'Meara, C O'Halloran and L Lynch 0–1 each, B Duff 1–0 |

| 8 August 2025 Round 2 | Dromin/Athlacca | 1–16 – 1–21 | Monaleen | Fedamore Grounds |
| | D Reidy 1–11 (1–10 frees), T Boddy 0–4 (3 frees), D Griffin 0–1. | Report | A La Touche Cosgrave 1–2, D Ó Dálaigh, M Fitzgerald (4 frees) 0–4 each, L Murphy 0–3, E O'Driscoll, D Ferland, J Fitzgerald 0–2 each, D Langan (free), R Lyons 0–1 each. |

| 8 August 2025 Round 2 | Newcastle West | 2–16 – 2–16 | Kildimo-Pallaskenry | Seán Finn Park |
| | M McMahon 2–1, Con Hayes 0–4, Cathal Hayes (0–3, 0–2 frees, 0–1 65), M Dee and D Lyons 0–2 each, B Hurley, Eoin Hurley, M Cremin and B Foley 0–1 each | Report | J O'Keefe 1–4, C McMahon 1–0, R O'Farrell (0–3, 0–1 free), S Barry (0–3, 0–1 free), S Hartigan (0–2, 0–1 free), P Nash 0–2, D Fitzgerald and C Downes 0–1 |

| 22 August 2025 Round 3 | Mungret/St Paul's | 1–19 – 2–23 | Monaleen | Childers Road |
| | L Lynch 0–6 (3f), N Mulcahy and M O’Brien (3f) 0–3 each, C O’Halloran 1–0, B O’Meara and C Moloney 0–2 each, B Duff, F Fitzgerald and B Giltenane 0–1 each. | Report | D Ó Dálaigh, J Fitzgerald (0–2 frees) 1–4 each, L Lyons (0–1 free), D Ferland 0–3 each, E O’Driscoll, D Langan 0–2 each, M Fitzgerald (0–1 free), R Lyons, L Murphy, B Hayes and E Maher 0–1 each; |

| 22 August 2025 Round 3 | Adare | 0–18 – 0–16 | Kildimo-Pallaskenry | Seán Finn Park |
| | W Griffin 0–9 (0–7 frees), M Mackey, D O’Mahoney, J Fitzgibbon (0–2 frees) 0–2 each, P Kearney, J McSweeney, M Connolly 0–1 each. | Report | S Barry 0–6 (0–6 frees), D Fitzgerald 0–3, J O’Keeffe, C McMahon and R O’Farrell 0–2 each, C Downes 0–1. |

| 23 August 2025 Round 3 | Newcastle West | 0–14 – 0–14 | Dromin/Athlacca | Páirc an Chrócaigh |
| | Cathal Hayes (0–6, 0–5 frees), Eoin Hurley 0–4, B Hurley, M Dee, Con Hayes, B Foley 0–1 each | Report | D Reidy (0–5, 0–4 frees), T Boddy (0–5, 0–4 frees), D Breen, D Griffin, J Fitzgibbon and S Fitzgibbon 0–1 each |

| 28 August 2025 Round 4 | Monaleen | 1–18 – 0–19 | Newcastle West | Seán Finn Park |
| | M Fitzgerald (0–6, 0–5f); L Lyons (1–2, 0-1f); D Ó Dálaigh (0–4); J Fitzgerald (0–2); L Murphy, A La Touche Cosgrave, D Ferland, E O’Driscoll (0–1 each). | Report | Cathal Hayes (0–6, 5f); M Quilligan (0–4, 3f); B Nix (0–3); Ethan Hurley (0–2, 1f); Con Hayes (0–2); M Dee, Eoin Hurley (0–1). |

| 29 August 2025 Round 4 | Kildimo-Pallaskenry | 0–10 – 1–18 | Mungret/St Paul's | Ballybrown Grounds |
| | S Barry 0–4 (frees), S Hartigan 0–3, J O'Keeffe 0–2, E McLoughlin 0–1. | Report | L Lynch 1–5 (0–3 frees), N Mulcahy 0–5, B Giltenane 0–3, B Duff 0–2, F Fitzgerald (free), B O'Meara, M O'Brien 0–1 each. |

| 30 August 2025 Round 4 | Dromin/Athlacca | 1–15 – 4–17 | Adare | Ballybrown Grounds |
| | D Reidy 1–6 (1 pen, 6f), T Boddy 0–5 (4f), S Fitzgibbon 0–2, D Breen 0–2. | Report | P Kearney 1–7 (6f), D Hannon 2–2, S Connolly 1–1, D O’Mahoney 0–2, R Conolly 0–1, S Hickey 0–2, M Connolly 0–1. |

| 13 September 2025 Round 5 | Adare | 2-17 - 1-18 | Newcastle West | Mick Neville Park |
| | B O'Connor 1-0, J Fitzgibbon (1-5, 0-3 frees, 0-1 penalty), P Kearney (0-8, 0-7 frees), D O'Mahoney, S Hickey, J Hannon and D Hannon 0-1 each | Report | Ethan Hurley 1-0, Eoin Hurley 0-2, Con Hayes 0-5, Cathal Hayes (0-3, 0-3 frees), M Quilligan (0-2, 0-2 frees), M McMahon 0-2, B Hurley, M Dee and B Nix 0-1 each |

| 13 September 2025 Round 5 | Mungret/St Paul's | 1-21 - 1-15 | Dromin/Athlacca | Bruff Grounds |
| | L Lynch 0-8 (0-7 frees), B Duff 1-3, M O’Brien 0-5, N Mulcahy, B O’Meara 0-2 each, F Fitzgerald 0-1 (0-1 free). | Report | D Reidy 1-6 (1-5 frees), T Boddy 0-6 (0-4 frees), D Griffin, M Reidy, S O’Leary 0-1 each |

| 13 September 2025 Round 5 | Monaleen | 0-21 - 0-21 | Kildimo-Pallaskenry | Ballybrown Grounds |
| | M Fitzgerald 0-6 (6 frees), L Lyons 0-4 (4 frees), L Murphy, D Ferland, M O'Dwyer (2 frees) 0-2 each, B Hayes, C Ó Duinn, E O'Driscoll, E Maher, A La Touche Cosgrave 0-1 each; | Report | S Barry 0-7 (7 frees), J O'Keeffe 0-6, S Hartigan (2 frees), L Griffin (1 free, 1 sideline cut) 0-3 each, R O'Farrell, D Fitzgerald 0-1 each. |

== Knockout stage ==
=== Quarter-finals ===
| 21 September 2025 Quarter-final | Ballybrown | 0-20 - 2-10 | Adare | Páirc na nGael |
| | A O’Connor 0-8 (7f); R Griffin 0-4; C Coughlan 0-2; R Kenny 0-2; J Coughlan 0-1; B Griffin 0-1, L O’Connor 0-1; B Smith 0-1. | Report | W Griffin 1-7 (6f); J Fitzgibbon 1-3 (2f). |

| 21 September 2025 Quarter-final | Kilmallock | 2-27 - 0-30 (aet) | Monaleen | Bruff Grounds |
| | S O'Brien (2-14, 0-10 frees, 0-1 65), K Hayes, P Connery and C Staunton 0-2 each, P O'Brien, O Enright, P O'Reilly, O O'Reilly, R Hanley, D Woulfe, S Carroll 0-1 each. | Report | L Lyons (0-8, 0-6 frees), M Fitzgerald (0-4, 0-2 frees), M O'Dwyer (0-6, 0-6 frees), J Fitzgerald 0-4, D Ferland and A La Touche Cosgrove 0-2 each, D Langan, D Ó Dálaigh, R Lyons and L Murphy 0-1 each |

=== Semi-finals ===
| 5 October 2025 Semi-final | Na Piarsaigh | 2-20 - 1-17 | Kilmallock | Bruff Grounds |
| | A Breen 2-1, K Downes 0-6 (5f) (1 65'), P Casey 0-5, D Dempsey and W Henn 0-2 each, M Casey, R Lynch, T Grimes and D Lynch 0-1 each. | Report | S O'Brien 0-9 (6f), C Hanley Clarke 0-3 (3f), O Enright 1-0, O O'Reilly, D Woulfe, M Houlihan, P O'Brien 0-1 each. | Referee: Johnny Murphy |

| 5 October 2025 Semi-final | Doon | 2-21 - 0-14 | Ballybrown | FitzGerald Park |
| | A English (0-10, 0-8 frees), E Stokes 1-2, K Maher 1-1, D Coughlan 0-3, P Ryan, C Ryan, C O'Donovan, D O'Donovan and D Coleman 0-1 each | Report | A O'Connor (0-11, 0-9 frees, 0-1 65), C Coughlan, L O'Connor and L Doolan 0-1 each | Referee: John O’Halloran |

=== Final ===
| 19 October 2025 Final | Doon | 2-18 - 2-25 (aet) | Na Piarsaigh | TUS Gaelic Grounds |
| | A English (0-10, 6 frees); D. Coleman, D O’Donovan (0-1 sidelIne) (1-2 each); E Stokes (0-2); P Ryan, D Coughlan (0-1 each). | Report | K Downes (0-6, frees); A Breen (1-2); C Boylan (1-1); P Casey (0-4); R Lynch (0-3, frees); W Henn, M Foley, W O’Donoghue, K Dempsey (1 free), D Dempsey (0-2 each). | Referee: K Guina (Feohanagh/Castlemahon) |

== Championship statistics ==
=== Top scorers ===
Overall

| Rank | Player | Club | Tally | Total | Matches | Average |
|---|---|---|---|---|---|---|
| 1 | Shane O'Brien | Kilmallock | 4–59 | 71 | 7 | 10.14 |
| 1 | Aidan O'Connor | Ballybrown | 2–65 | 71 | 7 | 10.14 |
| 3 | Tom Morrissey | Ahane | 1–56 | 59 | 5 | 11.80 |
| 4 | Adam English | Doon | 1–55 | 58 | 7 | 8.28 |
| 5 | David Reidy | Dromin/Athlacca | 3–40 | 49 | 5 | 9.80 |
| 6 | Kevin Downes | Na Piarsaigh | 1–43 | 46 | 6 | 7.66 |
| 7 | Willie Griffin | Adare | 1–29 | 32 | 5 | 6.33 |
| 8 | Adrian Breen | Na Piarsaigh | 5–16 | 31 | 7 | 4.42 |
| 8 | Patrick Kearney | Adare | 2–25 | 31 | 6 | 5.16 |
| 10 | Matthew Fitzgerald | Monaleen | 0–26 | 26 | 6 | 4.33 |

In a single game

| Rank | Player | Club | Tally | Total | Opposition |
|---|---|---|---|---|---|
| 1 | Shane O'Brien | Kilmallock | 2–14 | 20 | Monaleen |
| 2 | Tom Morrissey | Ahane | 1–13 | 16 | Doon |
| 3 | David Reidy | Dromin/Athlacca | 1–10 | 13 | Monaleen |
| 3 | Adam English | Doon | 0–13 | 13 | Kilmallock |
| 3 | Aidan O'Connor | Ballybrown | 0–13 | 13 | Doon |
| 6 | Aidan O'Connor | Ballybrown | 1–09 | 12 | Na Piarsaigh |
| 6 | Aaron Gillane | Patrickswell | 0–12 | 12 | Kilmallock |
| 6 | Willie Griffin | Adare | 0–12 | 12 | Monaleen |
| 6 | Tom Morrissey | Ahane | 0–12 | 12 | Ballybrown |
| 6 | David Reidy | Dromin/Athlacca | 0–12 | 12 | Kildimo-Pallaskenry |

=== Miscellaneous ===
- Ballybrown beat Patrickswell in championship hurling for the first time since 1991.
