= 2024 Limerick Senior Hurling Championship =

Annual hurling competition in Limerick

- Dates: 1 August – 27 October 2024
- Teams: 12
- Sponsor: Bon Secours Hospital
- Champions: Doon (1st title); Darragh O'Donovan (captain); Derek McGrath (manager)
- Runners-up: Na Piarsaigh; Mike Casey (captain); Shane O'Neill (manager)
- Relegated: South Liberties

Tournament statistics
- Matches played: 35
- Goals scored: 92 (2.63 per match)
- Points scored: 1269 (36.26 per match)
- Top scorer(s): Aidan O'Connor (3–60)

The 2024 Limerick Senior Hurling Championship was the 130th staging of the Limerick Senior Hurling Championship since its establishment by the Limerick County Board in 1887. The draws for the group stage pairings took place on 6 February 2024. The championship ran from 1 August to 27 October 2024.

Na Piarsaigh were the defending champions.

The final was played on 27 October 2024 at the TUS Gaelic Grounds in Limerick, between Na Piarsaigh and Doon, in what was their third meeting overall in the final and a first final meeting in four years. Doon won the match by 0–16 to 2–09 to claim their first ever championship title.

Ballybrown's Aidan O'Connor was the championship's top scorer with 3–60.

== Team changes ==
=== To Championship ===
Promoted from the Limerick Premier Intermediate Hurling Championship

- Dromin/Athlacca

=== From Championship ===
Relegated to the Limerick Premier Intermediate Hurling Championship

- Garryspillane

== Group 1 ==
=== Group 1 table ===
Semi-finalists Quarter-finalists Relegated

Team	Matches				Score			Pts
Team	Pld	W	D	L	For	Against	Diff	Pts
Doon	5	4	0	1	125	110	15	8
Na Piarsaigh	5	4	0	1	121	96	25	8
Kilmallock	5	3	0	2	120	117	3	6
Patrickswell	5	2	0	3	115	107	8	4
Ahane	5	2	0	3	111	114	−3	4
Mungret/St Paul's	5	0	0	5	92	140	−48	0

=== Group 1 results ===
1 August 2024 Round 1	Doon	2–20 – 3–16	Kilmallock	TUS Gaelic Grounds
	A English 0–10 (9f), D Stapleton 1–1, C Thomas 1–0, C O’Donovan 0–3, G Thomas and P Ryan 0–2 each, D Coughlan and R English 0–1 each	Report	P O’Reilly 2–2, M Houlihan 0–5 (3f, 1 ’65), P O’Loughlin 0–4 (4f), S O’Brien 1–1, O’ O’Reilly 0–2, G Mulcahy, A Costello 0–1 each.

2 August 2024 Round 1	Na Piarsaigh	0–23 – 1–17	Patrickswell	TUS Gaelic Grounds
	R Lynch 0–8 (0–6 frees); K Downes 0–4; W Henn 0–3; S Dowling (0–2 frees), D Dempsey, C Boylan 0–2 each; W Kearns, D Lynch 0–1.	Report	A Gillane 0–9 (0–5 frees, 0–1 ’65); P Kirby 1–1; J Kelleher 0–3; D Byrnes 0–2; C Lynch, E Fitzgerald 0–1 each.

3 August 2024 Round 1	Mungret/St Paul's	0–19 – 1–17	Ahane	Childers Road
	P O’Brien 0–10 (7f), S Duff, B O’Meara and B Duff 0–2 each, S Barry, F Fitzgerald and R Duff 0–1 each.	Report	T Morrissey 1–7 (3f), R Fox 0–5, G Brennan 0–3, D Minihin and C O’Connell 0–1 each

9 August 2024 Round 2	Patrickswell	0–20 – 4–14	Doon	FitzGerald Park
	D Byrnes 0–5 (0-3f); A Gillane 0–4 (0-3f); C Lynch, P Kirby 0–3 each; E Fitzgerald, K O’Brien, M Carmody, N Foley, J Gillane (free), 0–1 each.	Report	A English 1–5 (0–4 frees); C Thomas 1–1; D Stapleton, D O’Donovan 1–0 each; K Maher 0–3; G Thomas 0–2; R English, E Stokes, D Coughlan 0–1 each.

9 August 2024 Round 2	Kilmallock	1–20 – 1–19	Mungret/St Paul's	Bruff Grounds
	S O'Brien 1–6, M Houlihan 0–3 (0–2 frees), P Connery 0–4, P O'Reilly and G Mulcahy 0–2 each and O O'Reilly 0–2 each K O'Donnell 0–1,	Report	P O'Brien (0–11, 0–10 frees), N Mulcahy 1–1, B Barry and B Duff 0–2 each B Duff and D O'Hagan 0–1 each

10 August 2024 Round 2	Ahane	1–17 – 1–22	Na Piarsaigh	Fr Hayes Memorial Park
	T Morrissey 0–12 (0–10 frees); W Brennan 1–1; R Fox 0–2; G Brennan, D Minihan 0–1 each.	Report	R Lynch 0–7 (6 frees); W Henn 0–4; D Dempsey 1–0, M Foley 0–3; D Lynch, C Boylan, T Grimes 0–2 each; S Dowling (free), J Fitzgerald 0–1 each.

29 August 2024 Round 3	Kilmallock	4–17 – 1–18	Ahane	Mick Neville Park
	M Houlihan 0–9 (8f), O O’Reilly 2–2, S O’Brien 1–1, P O’Reilly 1–0, K O’Donnell 0–2, P Connery, R Hanley and C Staunton 0–1 each.	Report	T Morrissey 0–9 (6f, 1 ’65), G Brennan 1–0, W Brennan, C O’Mara and R Fox 0–2 each, J Butler, C Barry and S Power 0–1 each.

30 August 2024 Round 3	Doon	1–15 – 0–17	Na Piarsaigh	FitzGerald Park
	A English 0–8 (7f), D Coughlan 1–1, D O’Donovan 0–2 (1 s/l), C Thomas, G Thomas, K Maher and B Murphy 0–1 each.	Report	S Dowling 0–3 (3f), R Lynch (2f) and K Downes 0–2 each, E McEvoy, T Grimes, C Boylan, J Boylan, D Dempsey, W Henn (f), M Foley, D Lynch, W Kearns and J Finn 0–1 each.

31 August 2024 Round 3	Patrickswell	2–28 – 1–12	Mungret/St Paul's	Childers Road
	P Kirby 1–6, C Lynch 1–3, A Gillane 0–7 (4f), K O’Brien 0–4, D Byrnes (1f) and T O’Brien 0–2 each, M Carmody, J Kelleher, E Harmon and J Kirby 0–1 each.	Report	C O’Halloran 1–2, P O’Brien 0–5 (3f), N Mulcahy, R Duff, F Fitzgerald, L Lynch and D O’Hagan 0–1 each.

6 September 2024 Round 4	Na Piarsaigh	1–26 – 1–17	Kilmallock	Doon Grounds
	R Lynch (0–13, 8f, 1 ’65, 1 s/l), D Dempsey (1–2), C Boylan (0–5), T Grimes and A Breen (0–2), W Henn and M Foley (0–1 each).	Report	M Houlihan (0–8, 7f), P O’Reilly (1–1), P O’Loughlin (1f), P Connery and S O’Brien (0–2 each), K O’Donnell and C Hanley-Clarke (0–1 each).

7 September 2024 Round 4	Mungret/St Paul's	0–18 – 5–21	Doon	FitzGerald Park
	F Fitzgerald 0–6 (0–1 ’65); P O’Brien 0–3 (0-1f, 0–1 ’65); L Lynch 0–2; C O’Halloran 0–1; N Mulcahy 0–1, B Barry 0–1, Shane Barry 0–1; S Duff 0–1; R Duff 0–1; B Duff 0–1.	Report	A English 1–7 (0-3f, 0–1 ’65); C Thomas 1–2; D Stapleton 1–1; B Murphy 1–1 (1–0 pen); Eddie Stokes 1–1; C O’Donovan 0–3; G Thomas 0–2; K Maher 0–2; P Ryan (free) 0–1; P Cummins 0–1.

13 September 2024 Round 4	Ahane	1–17 – 1–19	Patrickswell	Childers Road
	T Morrissey 1–11 (0–9 frees); W Brennan 0–2; C Heffernan, P Harnett, R Fox, M Donnellan 0–1 each.	Report	P Kirby 1–4; D Byrnes (0–3 frees), J Kelleher (0–2 frees) 0–5 each; E Fitzgerald 0–2; C Lynch, N Foley, K O’Brien 0–1 each.

22 September 2024 Round 5	Patrickswell	1–16 – 0–23	Kilmallock	Mick Neville Park
	J Kelleher (0–2 frees), D Byrnes (0–3 frees) 0–4 each; K O’Brien, P Kirby (0–2 frees) 0–3; G Carey 1–0; J Gillane, E Harmon 0–1 each.	Report	S O’Brien, M Houlihan (0–5 frees) 0–7 each; R Hanley 0–3; P Connery 0–2; G Mulcahy, P O’Loughlin, C Staunton, T Savage 0–1 each.

22 September 2024 Round 5	Doon	1–16 – 2–24	Ahane	Cappamore Grounds
	A English 0–8 (4 frees), P Ryan 1–1, D Stapleton, D O'Donovan (1 sideline cut) 0–2 each, B Murphy, C O'Donovan 0–1 each.	Report	T Morrissey 0–14 (7 frees, 1 '65'), G Brennan 1–3, C O'Mara 1–0, M Donnellan, W Brennan, R Fox 0–2 each, W McCormack 0–1;

22 September 2024 Round 5	Na Piarsaigh	2–21 – 1–15	Mungret/St Paul's	FitzGerald Park
	D Lynch 1–5, R Lynch 0–6 (0–3 frees, 0–1 65), K Downes 1–1, K Dempsey 0–2, C Boylan 0–2, JJ Carey 0–2, M Foley and D Dempsey 0–1 each.	Report	M O'Brien 0–4 (0–4 frees), B Duff 1–1, P O'Brien 0–3 (0–2 frees), L Lynch, F Fitzgerald, C O'Halloran, S Duff and S Barry 0–1 each

== Group 2 ==
=== Group 2 table ===
Promoted, quarter-finalists Quarter-finalists Relegated

Team	Matches				Score			Pts
Team	Pld	W	D	L	For	Against	Diff	Pts
Ballybrown	5	4	0	1	120	113	7	8
Monaleen	5	4	0	1	122	93	29	8
Kildimo-Pallaskenry	5	2	1	2	92	92	0	5
Dromin/Athlacca	5	2	0	3	114	119	−5	4
Adare	5	2	0	3	125	117	8	4
South Liberties	5	0	1	4	85	124	−39	1

=== Group 2 results ===
1 August 2024 Round 1	Dromin/Athlacca	2–23 – 3–14	South Liberties	FitzGerald Park
	D Reidy 1–14 (0–12 frees); D Scully 0–5; P McMahon 1–0; C Scully 0–2; J Fitzgibbon 0–1; M Reidy 0–1.	Report	B Nash 0–9 (0–8 frees); S O’Neill 2–0; T Ryan 0–3; B Garry 1–0; S Brosnan 0–1; E Godfrey 0–1.

2 August 2024 Round 1	Kildimo-Pallaskenry	2–21 – 0–19	Adare	Mick Neville Park
	S Barry (3f) and R O’Farrell (1f) 1–3 each, L Griffin 0–5 (3f), K Hayes and J O’Keeffe 0–3 each, S Hartigan 0–2, C McMahon and D Fitzgerald 0–1 each.	Report	J Fitzgibbon (2f), W Griffin (3f) 0–5 each, D O’Mahony 0–3, D Hannon 0–2, P Heffernan, W McNamara, S Hickey and M Keane 0–1 each.

3 August 2024 Round 1	Monaleen	1–16 – 0–22	Ballybrown	Fedamore Grounds
	M Fitzgerald 1–3 (0–3 frees); D Ó Dálaigh, D Ferland (0-2f), L Lyons (0-2f, 0–1 ’65) 0–3 each; E O’Driscoll, A La Touche Cosgrave, J Power (free), R Lyons 0–1 each.	Report	A O’Connor 0–10 (0-5f, 0–1 ’65); L O’Connor 0–3; J Coughlan, L Doolan 0–2 each; K Gavin, B O’Connor, B Adams, R Kenny, A Cliffe 0–1 each.

8 August 2024 Round 2	South Liberties	0–10 – 0–23	Monaleen	Fedamore Grounds
	B Nash 0–7 (frees), K Byrnes 0–2, B Compton 0–1.	Report	M Fitzgerald 0–8 (0–3 frees), L Lyons 0–3 (frees), D Langan, R Lyons, L McHale, D Ferland, D O Dálaigh 0–2 each, A La Touche Cosgrave, E O'Driscoll 0–1 each.

8 August 2024 Round 2	Ballybrown	0–18 – 1–07	Kildimo-Pallaskenry	Mick Neville Park
	A O’Connor 0–11 (0–8 frees, 0–2 ‘65’); L O’Connor 0–3; B O’Connor 0–2; L Doolan, Barry Adams 0–1 each.	Report	S Barry 0–4 (all frees); S Hartigan 1–0; L Griffin 0–2 (0–1 free, 0–1 ’65); R O’Farrell 0–1.

10 August 2024 Round 2	Adare	1–16 – 2–15	Dromin/Athlacca	Ballyagran Grounds
	J Fitzgibbon 0–8 (5f, 2‘65s, 1 s/l), M Mackey 1–0, D O’Mahony 0–3, S Gleeson 0–2, D Gleeson, M Keane and B O’Connor 0–1 each.	Report	D Reidy 0–9 (6f), J Fitzgibbon and S O’Leary 1–1 each, D Breen 0–2, D Scully and C Scully 0–1

30 August 2024 Round 3	Dromin/Athlacca	1–14 – 0–20	Kildimo-Pallaskenry	Newcastle West Grounds
	D Reidy 1–10 ( 1–7 frees), D Scully 0–2, C Scully, P McMahon 0–1 each.	Report	S Barry 0–5 (0–5 frees) L Griffin 0–4 (0–3 frees, 0–1 65’) R O’Farrell, S Hartigan 0–3 each, K Hayes 0–2, C Staff, C McMahon, D Fitzgerald 0–1 each.

31 August 2024 Round 3	South Liberties	1–20 – 0–25	Ballybrown	Fedamore Grounds
	B Nash 0–12 (10 frees), B Crompton 1–2, B Cooney 0–3, D Garry 0–2, K Byrnes 0–1.	Report	A O'Connor 0–14 (10 frees), B Griffin, B Adams, C Coughlan, L O'Connor, A Cliffe 0–2 each, L Doolan 0–1;

31 August 2024 Round 3	Adare	3–15 – 2–25	Monaleen	Bruff Grounds
	D Hannon 2–4 (0–3 frees), J Fitzgibbon 1–7 (0–4 frees), B O'Connor, R Connolly, M Keane, S Connolly 0–1 each.	Report	D Ó Dálaigh 1–6, L Lyons 0–5 (0–4 frees), M Fitzgerald 0–5 (0–5 frees), B Hayes 1–0, E O'Driscoll 0–3, D Ferland 0–2, J Fitzgerald 0–2, L Murphy and A La Touche Cosgrave 0–1 each.

5 September 2024 Round 4	Kildimo-Pallaskenry	1–12 – 1–12	South Liberties	Ballybrown Grounds
	L Griffin 1–1 (0–1 free), S Barry 0–4 (3 frees, 1 ’65’), J O’Keeffe, S Kavanagh 0–2 each, P Nash, S Hartigan, R O’Farrell 0–1 each.	Report	B Nash 0–7 (4 frees, 1 ’65’), S Brosnahan 1–1, J Hickey, B Crompton, B McSweeney, B Cooney 0–1 each.

6 September 2024 Round 4	Ballybrown	2–17 – 3–22	Adare	Mick Neville Park
	L O’Connor 2–1, A O’Connor 0–8 (0-5frees), L Doolin 0–4, R Kenny 0–2, A Cliffe, C Coughlan 0–1 each.	Report	D Hannon 1–11( 0–5 frees) J Fitzgibbon 1–4 (0–4 frees), B O’Connor 1–0, D Gleeson, D O’Mahony, S Gleeson, S Hickey, R Connolly, M Mackey, J Hannon 0–1 each.

6 September 2024 Round 4	Monaleen	2–20 – 1–14	Dromin/Athlacca	Cappamore Grounds
	D O Dálaigh 1–4, M Fitzgerald 1–5 (0–5 frees), L Lyons 0–2 (0–1 free, 0–1 65), J Fitzgerald 0–2, D Ferland 0–2, L Murphy 0–2, E O'Driscoll and B Hayes 0–1 each.	Report	D Reidy 0–9 (0–8 frees), J Fitzgibbon 1–0, D Breen 0–2, C Scully, S O'Leary and M Reidy 0–1 each

22 September 2024 Round 5	Adare	2–26 – 1–12	South Liberties	Fedamore Grounds
	D Hannon 0–9 (6 frees), M Mackey 1–3, S Connolly1-2, B O'Connor 0–4, D O'Mahony, J Fitzgibbon (2 frees), S Heffernan 0–2 each, R Connolly, S Gleeson 0–1 each;	Report	B Nash 0–7 (5 frees, 1 '65'), B McSweeney 1–0, B Crompton, A Nash (free), B O'Donoghue, T Ryan, D Garry 0–1 each.

22 September 2024 Round 5	Dromin-Athlacca	4–18 – 4–20	Ballybrown	Childers Road
	D Reidy 1–13 (0–11 frees), D Breen 3–1, J Fitzgibbon 0–2, S Fitzgibbon, M Reidy 0–1 each.	Report	A O'Connor 3–9 (0–6 frees), R Kenny 1–4, B Adams 0–2, A Cliffe, L O'Connor, K Gavin, L Doolin and B Griffin 0–1 each.

22 September 2024 Round 5	Kildimo-Pallaskenry	1–17 – 1–20	Monaleen	Mungret Grounds
	S Barry 0–5 (frees), L Griffin 0–5 (0–3 frees), K Hayes 0–4, P Nash 1–0, J O'Keeffe 0–2, R O'Farrell 0–1.	Report	M Fitzgerald 1–6 (0–5 frees), D O Dálaigh 0–6, L McHale 0–3, L Lyons 0–2 (frees), J Power (free), A La Touche Cosgrave, E O'Driscoll 0–1 each.

== Knockout stage ==
=== Quarter-finals ===
6 October 2024 Quarter-final	Kilmallock	1–22 – 2–17	Ballybrown	Mick Neville Park
	S O’Brien 1–5; C Hanley Clarke 0–5 (0–2 frees, 0–1 ’65); G Mulcahy 0–4; M Houlihan 0–3 (frees); P Connery 0–2; P O’Reilly, O O’Reilly 0–1 each.	Report	A O’Connor 0–8 (0–4 frees, 0–1 ’65); B Griffin 1–2; L O’Connor 0–4; B O’Connor 1–0; R Kenny 0–2. L Doolan 0–1.

6 October 2024 Quarter-final	Patrickswell	0–20 – 0–18	Monaleen	Bruff Grounds
	A Gillane 0–8 (7f, ’65), D Byrnes 0–3 P, K O’Brien, P Kirby and M Carmody 0–2 each, T O’Brien, E Fitzgerald and C Lynch 0–1 each.	Report	L Lyons 0–7 (5f), M Fitzgerald 0–4 (4f), A La Touche Cosgrave 0–2, J Fitzgerald, E O’Driscoll, L Murphy, D Ó Dálaigh and D Langan 0–1 each.

=== Semi-finals ===
13 October 2024 Semi-final	Doon	2–24 – 2–12	Patrickswell	FitzGerald Park
	A English 0–9 (5f, 1 ’65), K Maher 2–2, P Ryan 0–4, R English 0–3, C Thomas and D O’Donovan (1 s/l) 0–2 each, J Ryan and E Stokes 0–1 each.	Report	A Gillane 0–5 (4f), D Byrnes 0–4 (2 ‘65s), P Kirby 1–1, K O’Brien 1–0, T O’Brien and E Fitzgerald 0–1 each.

13 October 2024 Semi-final	Na Piarsaigh	1–16 – 0–18	Kilmallock	Mick Neville Park
	R Lynch 1–9 (0–6 frees, 0–2 ’65); JJ Carey and W Henn (0–2 each); A Breen, M Foley, W Kearns 0–1 each.	Report	Conor Hanley Clarke 0–9 (0–7 free); R Hanley, P Connery, O O’Reilly (0–2 each); M Houlihan, P O’Loughlin (free), S O’Brien (0–1 each).

=== Final ===
27 October 2024 Final	Doon	0–16 – 2–09	Na Piarsaigh	TUS Gaelic Grounds
	A English (0–11, 0–7 frees, 0–1 ‘65’); B Murphy, D O’Donovan, P Ryan, G Thomas, D Stapleton (all 0–1).	Report	D Dempsey and A Breen (both 1–0); R Lynch and S Dowling (both 0–2 frees); C Boylan, M Foley. JJ Carey, P Casey, D Lynch (all 0–1).	Referee: J O'Halloran (Bruree)

== Championship statistics ==
=== Top scorers ===
Overall

Rank	Player	Club	Tally	Total	Matches	Average
1	Aidan O'Connor	Ballybrown	3–60	69	6	11.50
2	David Reidy	Dromin/Athlacca	3–55	64	5	12.80
2	Adam English	Doon	2–58	64	7	9.14
4	Tom Morrissey	Ahane	2–53	59	5	11.80
5	Ronan Lynch	Na Piarsaigh	1–47	50	7	7.14
6	Barry Nash	South Liberties	0–42	42	5	8.40
7	Matthew Fitzgerald	Monaleen	3–31	40	6	6.66
8	Micheál Houlihan	Kilmallock	0–36	36	7	5.14
9	Shane O'Brien	Kilmallock	4–23	35	7	5.0
9	Declan Hannon	Adare	3–26	35	5	7.00

In a single game

Rank	Player	Club	Tally	Total	Opposition
1	Aidan O'Connor	Ballybrown	3–09	18	Dromin-Athlacca
2	David Reidy	Dromin/Athlacca	1–16	19	Ballybrown
3	David Reidy	Dromin/Athlacca	1–14	17	South Liberties
4	Declan Hannon	Adare	1–11	14	Ballybrown
4	Tom Morrissey	Ahane	1–11	14	Patrickswell
4	Aidan O'Connor	Ballybrown	0–14	14	South Liberties
4	Tom Morrissey	Ahane	0–14	14	Doon
8	David Reidy	Dromin/Athlacca	1–10	13	Kildimo-Pallaskenry
8	Ronan Lynch	Na Piarsaigh	0–13	13	Kilmallock
10	Ronan Lynch	Na Piarsaigh	1–09	12	Kilmallock
10	Barry Nash	South Liberties	0–12	12	Ballybrown
10	Tom Morrissey	Ahane	0–12	12	Na Piarsaigh

=== Miscellaneous ===
- Doon win their first ever title.
