= Eddie Stokes (hurler) =

Irish hurler

Personal information
- Native name: Éamonn Stóc (Irish)
- Born: 2002 (age 23–24) Doon, County Limerick, Ireland
- Occupation: Student

Sport
- Sport: Hurling
- Position: Left wing-forward
Club
- Years: Club
- 2020-present: Doon
Club titles
- Limerick titles: 1
College
- Years: College
- 2023-present: University College Cork
College titles
- Fitzgibbon titles: 0
Inter-county*
Years	County	Apps (scores)
2024-present	Limerick	0 (0-00)
Inter-county titles
- Munster titles: 0
- All-Irelands: 0
- NHL: 0
- All Stars: 0
- *Inter County team apps and scores correct as of 16:46, 2 February 2025.

Eddie Stokes (born 2002) is an Irish hurler. At club level he plays with Doon and at inter-county level he lines out with the Limerick senior hurling team.

== Career ==
Stokes played hurling at levels as a student at Scoil na Tríonóide Naofa. He eventually progressed to the senior team and was a Munster PPS SBHC runner-up in 2020. Stokes later played with University College Cork in the Fitzgibbon Cup.

At club level, Stokes first played for Doon at adult level in 2022. He was part of the team that won the club's inaugural Limerick SHC title in 2024, following a 0–16 to 2–09 win over Na Piarsaigh in the final.

Stokes first appeared on the inter-county scene with Limerick during a two-year tenure with the minor team. He won consecutive Munster MHC titles in 2019 and 2020. Stokes immediately progressed to the under-20 team and was at wing-forward when Kilkenny beat Limerick in the 2022 All-Ireland under-20 final.

Stokes made his senior team debut in a National Hurling League game against Cork in February 2025.

== Career statistics ==
As of 22 March 2025.

Team	Year	National League			Munster		All-Ireland		Total	
Team	Year	Division	Apps	Score	Apps	Score	Apps	Score	Apps	Score
Limerick	2025	Division 1A	6	0-01	0	0-00	0	0-00	6	0-01
Career total			6	0-01	0	0-00	0	0-00	6	0-01

== Honours ==
Doon

- Limerick Senior Hurling Championship: 2024

Limerick

- Munster Under-20 Hurling Championship: 2022
- Munster Minor Hurling Championship: 2019, 2020
