= 2021 Limerick Senior Hurling Championship =

Annual hurling competition season

- Dates: 2 September – 24 October 2021
- Teams: 12
- Sponsor: Bon Secours Hospital
- Champions: Kilmallock (12th title); Philip O'Loughlin (captain); Tony Considine (manager)
- Runners-up: Patrickswell; Diarmaid Byrnes (captain); Jonathan O'Meara (manager)
- Relegated: Monaleen

Tournament statistics
- Matches played: 20
- Goals scored: 48 (2.4 per match)
- Points scored: 787 (39.35 per match)
- Top scorer(s): Micheál Houlihan (1–52)

The 2021 Limerick Senior Hurling Championship was the 127th staging of the Limerick Senior Hurling Championship since its establishment by the Limerick County Board in 1887. The draw for the group stage placings took place on 30 June 2021. The championship began on 3 September 2021 and ended on 24 October 2021.

Na Piarsaigh were the defending champions, however, they were beaten by Patrickswell in the semi-final. Monaleen were relegated from the championship after being beaten in a playoff by Blackrock.

The final was played on 24 October 2020 at the TUS Gaelic Grounds in Limerick, between Kilmallock and Patrickswell, in what was their first meeting in a final in 29 years. Kilmallock won the match by 1–24 to 0–19 to claim their 12th championship title overall and a first title since 2014.

Kilmallock's Micheál Houlihan was the championship's top scorer with 1–52.

== Team changes ==
=== To Championship ===
Promoted from the Limerick Premier Intermediate Hurling Championship

- Kildimo-Pallaskenry

=== From Championship ===
Relegated to the Limerick Premier Intermediate Hurling Championship

- Murroe-Boher

== Results ==
=== Section A ===
==== Group 1 table ====
Advance to semi-finals Advance to quarter-finals Advance to sectional relegation final

Team	Matches				Score			Pts
Team	Pld	W	D	L	For	Against	Diff	Pts
Na Piarsaigh	2	2	0	0	5–39	0–30	24	2
Kilmallock	2	1	0	1	0–42	5–36	−9	2
Ballybrown	2	0	0	2	2–35	2–50	−15	0

==== Group 1 results ====
4 September 2021 Round 1	Na Piarsaigh	3–16 – 0–15	Kilmallock	TUS Gaelic Grounds
	D Dempsey 1–2, W Henn 0–5, C Boylan 1–1, A Breen 1–1, R Lynch 0–3, K Dempsey 0–1, A McNamara 0–1, K Downes 0–1, S Long 0–1.		M Houlihan 0–5, D Woulfe 0–4, O O'Reilly 0–2, G O'Mahony 0–2, P O'Brien 0–1, R Hanley 0–1.

11 September 2021 Round 2	Ballybrown	2–20 – 0–27	Kilmallock	TUS Gaelic Grounds
	A O'Connor 1–6, C Coughlan 1–2, K Gavin 0–5, L O'Connor 0–4, J Adams 0–1, R Kenny 0–1, L Doolan 0–1.		M Houlihan 0–16, O O'Reilly 0–3, P O'Reilly 0–2, B Hennessy 0–1, R Hanley 0–1, D Woulfe 0–1, P O'Loughlin 0–1, G O'Mahony 0–1, K O'Donnell 0–1.

18 September 2021 Round 3	Ballybrown	0–15 – 2–23	Na Piarsaigh	TUS Gaelic Grounds
	A O'Connor 0–8, D Hartnett 0–2, C Coughlan 0–2, B Griffin 0–1, J Adams 0–1, K Gavin 0–1.		D Dempsey 2–4, R Lynch 0–4, W Henn 0–3, C Boylan 0–3, S Long 0–2, K Downes 0–2, K Dempsey 0–2, T Grimes 0–1, M Foley 0–1, E McEvoy 0–1.

==== Group 2 table ====
Advance to semi-finals Advance to quarter-finals Advance to sectional relegation final

Team	Matches				Score			Pts
Team	Pld	W	D	L	For	Against	Diff	Pts
Doon	2	2	0	0	2–45	2–39	6	4
Patrickswell	2	1	0	1	4–44	0–44	12	2
Ahane	2	0	0	2	1–33	5–39	−18	0

==== Group 2 results ====
5 September 2021 Round 1	Patrickswell	1–23 – 0–27	Doon	TUS Gaelic Grounds
	D Byrnes 0–8, A Gillane 0–7, C Lynch 1–2, J Kirby 0–2, C Carroll 0–1, M Carmody 0–1, N Foley 0–1, S O'Brien 0–1.		A English 0–16, P Ryan 0–4, B Murphy 0–2, D O'Donovan 0–1, M O'Brien 0–1, E Stokes 0–1, M Barry 0–1, M Ryan 0–1.

12 September 2021 Round 2	Ahane	0–17 – 3–21	Patrickswell	TUS Gaelic Grounds
	T Morrissey 0–12, C Barry 0–3, R Fox 0–1, P O'Halloran 0–1.		A Gillane 2–9, T O'Brien 1–2, J Considine 0–4, J Gillane 0–2, C Fitzgerald 0–1, C Carroll 0–1, J Kelleher 0–1, M Carmody 0–1.

19 September 2021 Round 3	Ahane	1–16 – 2–18	Doon	TUS Gaelic Grounds
	T Morrissey 1–6, N Moran 0–3, R Fox 0–2, C Barry 0–2, M Donnellan 0–2, D Minehan 0–1.		A English 0–8, P Ryan 1–3, J Ryan 1–1, D O'Donovan 0–2, C O'Donovan 0–2, D Coleman 0–2.

==== Relegation final ====
2 October 2021 Final	Ahane	1–21 – 1–15	Ballybrown	Páirc Uí Dromgúil
	T Morrissey 1–12 (six frees); R Fox 0–2; A O’Brien (free), P O’Halloran, M O’Halloran, K Enright, C Carroll, P Harnett, N Moran 0–1 each.	Report	A O’Connor 0–8 (four frees, one 65’); J Adams 1–1 (one free); L O’Connor 0–3; C Coughlan, K Gavin, R Kenny 0–1 each.

=== Section B ===
==== Group 1 table ====
Advance to sectional promotion final and championship quarter-finals Advance to championship relegation final

Team	Matches				Score			Pts
Team	Pld	W	D	L	For	Against	Diff	Pts
South Liberties	2	1	0	1	5–42	2–36	15	2
Garryspillane	2	1	0	1	3–37	2–42	−2	2
Blackrock	2	1	0	1	1–34	5–45	−13	2

==== Group 1 results ====
2 September 2021 Round 1	South Liberties	4–19 – 0–15	Blackrock	TUS Gaelic Grounds
	K Byrnes 1–6, B Garry 2–1, B Cooney 0–4, B McSweeney 1–0, A Nash 0–3, M Keane 0–2, B Nash 0–2, B Ryan 0–1.		D Dawson 0–6, P Leahy 0–5, B Moloney 0–1, J Quilty 0–1, D Heffernan 0–1, K Palmer 0–1.

12 September 2021 Round 2	Garryspillane	1–16 – 1–19	Blackrock	TUS Gaelic Grounds
	D O'Shea 0–8, M Quinlan 1–0, C Sheehan 0–3, E Sheehan 0–2, C Sheehan 0–2, M Bourke 0–1.		P Leahy 1–11, D Dawson 0–3, K Palmer 0–3, S O'Neill 0–1, D Moloney 0–1.

17 September 2021 Round 3	South Liberties	1–23 – 2–21	Garryspillane	TUS Gaelic Grounds
	K Byrnes 0–6, B Cooney 0–5, D O'Neill 0–5, B Nash 1–0, B Ryan 0–2, A Nash 0–1, S Kilcoyne 0–1, M Keane 0–1, T Ryan 0–1, B Garry 0–1.		D O'Shea 0–10, E Sheehan 2–1, C Sheehan 0–3, M Bourke 0–2, C Ryan 0–1, G Power 0–1, C Sheehan 0–1, D Barry 0–1, E O'Mahony 0–1.

==== Group 2 table ====
Advance to sectional promotion final and championship quarter-finals Advance to championship relegation final

Team	Matches				Score			Pts
Team	Pld	W	D	L	For	Against	Diff	Pts
Adare	2	2	0	0	3–48	2–35	16	4
Kildimo-Pallaskenry	2	1	0	1	1–39	1–36	3	2
Monaleen	2	0	0	2	1–31	2–47	−19	0

==== Group 2 results ====
3 September 2021 Round 1	Adare	2–27 – 1–16	Monaleen	TUS Gaelic Grounds
	W Griffin 0–11, M Connolly 1–2, M Keane 1–1, D Hannon 0–4, J Fitzgibbon 0–3, W McNamara 0–2, C McCarthy 0–1, J Hannon 0–1, E Ryan 0–1, D Lyons 0–1.		M O'Dwyer 0–6, D Ó Dálaigh 1–2, A La Touche Cosgrave 0–3, L Lyons 0–2, L McHale 0–1, R Lyons 0–1, L Murphy 0–1.

10 September 2021 Round 2	Kildimo-Pallaskenry	0–20 – 0–15	Monaleen	TUS Gaelic Grounds
	S Barry 0–5, J O'Keeffe 0–4, D O'Connell 0–3, L Griffin 0–2, K Hayes 0–2, B O'Connell 0–2, P Hartigan 0–1, C Downes 0–1.		M O'Dwyer 0–7, D Ó Dálaigh 0–3, A La Touche Cosgrave 0–2, C Nicholas 0–1, L Lyons 0–1, E Doyle 0–1.

19 September 2021 Round 3	Adare	1–21 – 1–19	Kildimo-Pallaskenry	TUS Gaelic Grounds
	W Griffin 0–8, D Hannon 1–2, J Fitzgibbon 0–2, C McCarthy 0–2, B O'Connor 0–1, M Connolly 0–1, J Hannon 0–1, M Keane 0–1, R Connolly 0–1, D Lyons 0–1, S O'Connor 0–1.		S Barry 0–7, D O'Connell 1–1, K Hayes 0–4, L Griffin 0–3, C Downes 0–2, J O'Keeffe 0–2.

==== Promotion final ====
16 October 2021 Final	South Liberties	1–14 – 0–20	Adare	FitzGerald Park, Kilmallock

=== Knockout stage ===
==== Relegation final ====
2 October 2021 Final	Monaleen	0–18 – 0–20	Blackrock	Bruff GAA Grounds
	M O'Dwyer 0–10, D Ó Dálaigh 0–4, R Lyons 0–2, E Doyle 0–1, A La Touche Cosgrave 0–1.		P Leahy 0–9, K Palmer 0–4, R O'Shaughnessy 0–3, D Dawson 0–2, B Moloney 0–1, J Quilty 0–1.

==== Quarter-finals ====
3 October 2021 Quarter-final	Kilmallock	1–33 – 5–17	South Liberties	TUS Gaelic Grounds
	M Houlihan 0–13 (0-8f), O O’Reilly 0–7, G Mulcahy 1–4, B Hennessy (0-2f), G O’Mahony, K O’Donnell, D Woulfe 0–2 each, R Hanley 0–1.	Report	B Ryan 0–8 (0-6f, 0–1 ’65), D O’Neill, B Nash (1-0f) 2–1 each, A Nash (0-3f), T Ryan (0-1f) 0–3 each, K Byrnes 1–0, J Hickey 0–1.	Referee: J O'Halloran (Bruree)

3 October 2021 Quarter-final	Patrickswell	0–20 – 0–18	Adare	TUS Gaelic Grounds
	D Byrnes (0-3f, 0–1 ’65), J Gillane 0–5 each, C Lynch 0–3, T O’Brien, A Gillane (0-2f) 0–2 each, J Considine, P Kirby, C Fitzgerald 0–1 each.	Report	W Griffin 0–7 (0-5f), J Fitzgibbon 0–3 (0-3f), C McCarthy 0–2, R Connolly, J Hannon, W McNamara, D O’Mahony, M Connolly, D Hannon 0–1 each.	Referee: E Stapleton (Doon)

==== Semi-finals ====
10 October 2021 Semi-final	Na Piarsaigh	1–22 – 3–21	Patrickswell	TUS Gaelic Grounds
	K Downes 0–7 (5f), K Dempsey 1–0, T Grimes, R Lynch (0-2f and 0–1 ‘65), D Dempsey 0–3 each, W O’Donoghue 0–2, M Foley, W Henn, C Boylan, A Breen 0–1 each.	Report	A Gillane 0–8 (0-5f), T O’Brien 1–2, D Byrnes 0–4 (0-3f), K O’Brien, P Kirby 1–1 each, C Lynch and J Gillane (0–1 sideline), 0–2 each, J Considine 0–1.	Referee: M Sexton (Bruree)

10 October 2021 Semi-final	Doon	2–16 – 4–20	Kilmallock	TUS Gaelic Grounds
	A English 0–7 (7f), P Cummins and R English 1–2 each, J Ryan 0–3, D O’Donovan and P Ryan 0–1 each	Report	O O’Reilly 2–4, M Houlihan 1–7 (1–0 pen, 0-5f), K O’Donnell 1–2, D Woulfe 0–3, P O’Koughlin 0–2, G Mulcahy and R Hanley 0–1

==== Final ====
24 October 2021 Final	Patrickswell	0–19 – 1–24	Kilmallock	TUS Gaelic Grounds
	A Gillane (0–7, 5 frees); D Byrnes (0–5, 3 frees, 1 65); P Kirby (0–3, 1 sl); J Gillane (0–2, 1 sl); T O’Brien, J Kelleher (0–1 each).	Report	M Houlihan (0–11, 9 frees); G Mulcahy (0–7); O O’Reilly (1–0); K O’Donnell (0–2); C Hanley, C Staunton, A Costello, D Woulfe (0–1 each).	Referee: E Stapleton (Doon)

== Championship statistics ==
=== Top scorers ===
Overall

Rank	Player	Club	Tally	Total	Matches	Average
1	Micheál Houlihan	Kilmallock	1–52	55	5	11.00
2	Aaron Gillane	Patrickswell	2–33	39	5	7.80
3	Tom Morrissey	Ahane	2–30	36	3	12.00
4	Adam English	Doon	0–31	31	3	10.33
5	Paudie Leahy	Blackrock	1–25	28	3	9.33
6	Willie Griffin	Adare	0–26	26	3	8.66
7	Oisín O'Reilly	Kilmallock	3–16	25	5	5.00
7	Aidan O'Connor	Ballybrown	1–22	25	3	8.33
9	Mark O'Dwyer	Monaleen	0–23	23	3	7.66
10	Diarmaid Byrnes	Patrickswell	0–22	22	5	4.40

In a single game

Rank	Player	Club	Tally	Total	Opposition
1	Micheál Houlihan	Kilmallock	0–16	16	Ballybrown
1	Adam English	Doon	0–16	16	Patrickswell
3	Aaron Gillane	Patrickswell	2–09	15	Ahane
4	Paudie Leahy	Blackrock	1–11	14	Garryspillane
5	Tom Morrissey	Ahane	2–09	15	Patrickswell
5	Tom Morrissey	Ahane	1–12	15	Ballybrown
7	Micheál Houlihan	Kilmallock	0–13	13	South Liberties
8	Willie Griffin	Adare	0–11	11	Monaleen
8	Micheál Houlihan	Kilmallock	0–11	11	Patrickswell
10	David Dempsey	Na Piarsaigh	2–04	10	Ballybrown
10	Oisín O'Reilly	Kilmallock	2–04	10	Doon
10	Micheál Houlihan	Kilmallock	1–07	10	Doon
10	Dylan O'Shea	Garryspillane	0–10	10	South Liberties
10	Mark O'Dwyer	Monaleen	0–10	10	Blackrock
