= 2016 Limerick Senior Hurling Championship =

Annual hurling competition season

- Dates: 7 May 2016 – 23 October 2016
- Teams: 12
- Sponsor: Credit Union
- Champions: Patrickswell (19th title); Thomas O'Brien (captain); Gary Kirby (manager)
- Runners-up: Ballybrown; Stephen O'Reilly (captain); Evan Loftus (manager)
- Relegated: Bruree; Murroe-Boher

Tournament statistics
- Matches played: 36
- Goals scored: 102 (2.83 per match)
- Points scored: 1122 (31.17 per match)
- Top scorer(s): Alan O'Connor (2–66)

The 2016 Limerick Senior Hurling Championship was the 122nd staging of the Limerick Senior Hurling Championship since its establishment by the Limerick County Board in 1887. The championship began on 7 May 2016 and ended on 23 October 2016.

Na Piarsaigh entered the championship as the defending champions, however, they failed to make it out of the group stage.

The final was played on 23 October 2016 at the Gaelic Grounds in Limerick, between Patrickswell and Ballybrown, in what was their fourth meeting the final overall and first meeting in the final in 21 years. Patrickswell won the match by 1–26 to 1–07 to claim a record-equalling 19th championship title overall and a first title in 13 years.

Ballybrown's Alan O'Connor was the championship's top scorer with 2–66.

== Team changes ==
=== To Championship ===
Promoted from the Limerick Premier Intermediate Hurling Championship

- Bruree
- Knockainey

=== From Championship ===
Relegated to the Limerick Premier Intermediate Hurling Championship

- Croom
- Effin

== Group 1 ==
=== Group 1 table ===
Advance to semi-finals Advance to quarter-finals Relegated

Team	Matches				Score			Pts
Team	Pld	W	D	L	For	Against	Diff	Pts
Kilmallock	5	4	1	0	132	88	44	9
Ballybrown	5	4	1	0	125	89	36	9
Doon	5	3	0	2	100	92	8	6
Na Piarsaigh	5	2	0	3	141	98	43	4
South Liberties	5	1	0	4	92	116	−24	2
Bruree	5	0	0	5	45	156	−111	0

=== Group 1 results ===
7 May 2016 Round 1	Bruree	0–08 – 2–20	Doon	St John's Park
	K O'Dea 0–5, G O'Brien 0–2, M Lane 0–1.		C McNamara 1–9, M Fitzgerald 1–2, M Barry 0–4, P Ryan 0–1, B Murphy 0–1, D Moloney 0–1, D Allis 0–1, R English 0–1.

7 May 2016 Round 1	Ballybrown	2–13 – 1–13	South Liberties	Childers Road
	A O'Connor 0–6, S Kenny 1–1, B Griffin 1–0, L Doolin 0–3, D Hall 0–2, R Griffin 0–1.		B Ryan 1–8, D O'Neill 0–2, B Nash 0–1, W Hickey 0–1, M Keane 0–1.

8 May 2016 Round 1	Na Piarsaigh	3–13 – 2–20	Kilmallock	Newcastle West Grounds
	K Downes 2–4, S Dowling 0–6, D Sheppard 1–0, D Breen 0–1, D Dempsey 0–1, R Lynch 0–1.		O O'Reilly 2–1, P O'Brien 0–4, E Ryan 0–4, J Mulcahy 0–3, G Mulcahy 0–3, R Hanley 0–2, P O'Loughlin 0–1, R Egan 0–1, K O'Donnell 0–1.

13 May 2016 Round 2	Ballybrown	4–25 – 2–09	Bruree	Newcastle West Grounds
	A O'Connor 0–11, S Kenny 2–3, D Hall 1–2, B Griffin 1–1, J Hall 0–3, R Griffin 0–2, S Foster 0–2, J Adams 0–1.		J O'Dea 1–4, S Feane 1–1, K O'Dea 0–3, G O'Dea 0–1.

14 May 2016 Round 2	Kilmallock	4–17 – 0–16	South Liberties	Bruff Grounds
	O O'Reilly 2–1, G Mulcahy 2–1, P O'Brien 0–5, E Ryan 0–5, P O'Loughlin 0–2, R Egan 0–1, J Mulcahy 0–1, B Hennessy 0–1.		B Ryan 0–8, B Nash 0–3, W Hickey 0–3, M Keane 0–2.

14 May 2016 Round 2	Doon	2–18 – 1–19	Na Piarsaigh	Fr Hayes Memorial Park
	B Murphy 1–6, M Fitzgerald 0–4, D O'Donovan 0–4, D Stapleton 1–0, R English 0–2, C McNamara 0–1, G Allis 0–1.		S Dowling 0–11, K Downes 1–0, A Dempsey 0–3, R Lynch 0–2, D Sheppard 0–1, A Breen 0–1, P Casey 0–1.

27 May 2016 Round 3	Doon	1–23 – 1–12	South Liberties	Fr Hayes Memorial Park
	D O'Donovan 0–10, B Murphy 0–7, M Barry 1–0, G Allis 0–2, D Stapleton 0–2, P Ryan 0–1, D Moloney 0–1.		B Ryan 0–10, B Nash 1–1, M Keane 0–1.

28 May 2016 Round 3	Ballybrown	3–15 – 2–18	Kilmallock	Bruff Grounds
	A O'Connor 1–4, R Griffin 0–5, B Griffin 1–1, D Hall 1–0, S Kenny 0–2, K Loftus 0–1, S Foster 0–1, J Hall 0–1.		R Ryan 0–8, R Hanley 1–1, O O'Reilly 1–0, J Mulcahy 0–3, G Mulcahy 0–2, P O'Brien 0–2, B O'Sullivan 0–1, R Egan 0–1.

28 May 2016 Round 3	Bruree	0–02 – 7–22	Na Piarsaigh	Clarina Grounds
	K O'Dea 0–2.		S Dowling 2–6, D Sheppard 3–2, A Dempsey 0–7, D Breen 1–3, K Downes 1–1, R Lynch 0–2, T Grimes 0–1.

19 August 2016 Round 4	Kilmallock	1–21 – 1–08	Bruree	Bruff Grounds
	J Mulcahy 1–4, G Mulcahy 0–6, R Egan 0–4, G O'Mahony 0–2, P O'Brien 0–1, C Staunton 0–1, A O'Shaughnessy 0–1, A Costelloe 0–1, L Walsh 0–1.		K O'Dea 1–3, G O'Brien 0–2, G O'Dea 0–1, T Cronnolly 0–1, JV O'Brien 0–1.

19 August 2016 Round 4	Na Piarsaigh	3–24 – 1–16	South Liberties	Childers Road
	S Dowling 1–10, D Dempsey 1–2, P Casey 0–5, D Sheppard 1–0, A Dempsey 0–3, A Breen 0–3, R Lynch 0–1.		D O'Neill 1–7, W Hickey 0–5, B Ryan 0–2, S O'Neill 0–1, B McSweeney 0–1.

21 August 2016 Round 4	Doon	0–09 – 1–15	Ballybrown	FitzGerald Park
			A O'Connor 0–6, B Griffin 1–1, R Griffin 0–2, L Doolan 0–2, S Kenny 0–1, D Hall 0–1, S Foster 0–1, K Loftus 0–1.

10 September 2016 Round 5	Bruree	0–09 – 3–17	South Liberties	Bruff Grounds
	K O'Dea 0–7, M Lane 0–1, J O'Dea 0–1.		B Ryan1 1–9, B Nash 2–2, W Hickey 0–2, D O'Neill 0–2, S O'Neill 0–2.

11 September 2016 Round 5	Kilmallock	4–17 – 1–12	Doon	Gaelic Grounds
	E Ryan 1–6, J Mulcahy 1–1, P O'Loughlin 1–1, R Hanley 1–0, G O'Mahony 0–2, P O'Brien 0–2, R Egan 0–2, G Mulcahy 0–2, B O'Sullivan 0–1.		D O'Donovan 0–5, P Coleman 1–0, B Murphy 0–3, M Ryan 0–2, P Cummins 0–1, P Ryan 0–1.

11 September 2016 Round 5	Na Piarsaigh	0–21 – 5–12	Ballybrown	Childers Road
	S Dowling 0–12, A Breen 0–3, D Sheppard 0–2, D Dempsey 0–2, P Casey 0–1, A Dempsey 0–1.		A O'Connor 1–6, D Hall 2–2, S Kenny 2–0, L Doolan 0–3, B Griffin 0–1.

== Group 2 ==
=== Group 2 table ===
Advance to semi-finals Advance to quarter-finals Relegated

Team	Matches				Score			Pts
Team	Pld	W	D	L	For	Against	Diff	Pts
Adare	5	5	0	0	124	71	53	10
Patrickswell	5	4	1	0	119	73	46	9
Ahane	5	2	0	3	83	84	−1	4
Bruff	5	2	0	3	71	116	−45	4
Knockainey	5	1	1	3	68	102	−34	3
Murroe-Boher	5	0	1	4	78	97	−19	1

=== Group 2 results ===
8 May 2016 Round 1	Adare	1–20 – 2–15	Patrickswell	Bruff Grounds
	W Griffin 0–9, J Fitzgibbon 1–5, D Hannon 0–3, A O'Connell 0–2, M Mackey 0–1.		A Gillane 2–5, D Byrnes 0–4, C Lynch 0–3, T O'Brien 0–1, B Foley 0–1, P Harty 0–1.

8 May 2016 Round 1	Ahane	3–12 – 1–14	Murroe/Boher	Fr Hayes Memorial Park
	T Morrissey 2–2, N Moran 1–2, C Carroll 0–4, M Carr 0–2, J Fox 0–2.		P McNamara 0–8, M Ryan 1–2, C Byrnes 0–1, D Sheehan 0–1, P Tobin 0–1, A Kennedy 0–1.

8 May 2016 Round 1	Bruff	2–11 – 1–11	Knockainey	FitzGerald Park
	S Bulfin 1–5, P O'Leary 1–0, P Browne 0–3, K Dillon 0–1, C Bulfin 0–1, C Browne 0–1.		D Walsh 0–6, J Lonergan 1–1, K Cleary 0–2, P Barron 0–2.

14 May 2016 Round 2	Adare	1–16 – 0–13	Ahane	Bruff Grounds
	W Griffin 0–6, A O'Connell 1–0, J Fitzgibbon 0–3, D Hannon 0–3, D Lyons 0–2, W McNamara 0–1, M Mackey 0–1.		C Carroll 0–5, J Fox 0–2, T Morrissey 0–2, C O'Mara 0–1, K Enright 0–1, C Ryan 0–1, N Moran 0–1.

15 May 2016 Round 2	Bruff	1–11 – 3–26	Patrickswell	Childers Road
	S Bulfin 0–5, C Browne 1–1, K Browne 0–2, D Madden 0–1, P Browne 0–1, C Bulfin 0–1.		A Gillane 1–6, C Lynch 1–3, K O'Brien 1–1, L Considine 0–4, D Byrnes 0–4, B Foley 0–3, J Kelleher 0–2, A Carroll 0–2, T O'Brien 0–1.

15 May 2016 Round 2	Knockainey	1–15 – 0–18	Murroe/Boher	Fr Hayes Memorial Park
	R Lonergan 1–1, J Lonergan 0–3, D Walsh 0–3, P Barron 0–3, M Cleary 0–2, P Kirby 0–2, S Lonergan 0–1.		P McNamara 0–10, J Casey 0–3, M Ryan 0–2, C Byrnes 0–2, P Tobin 0–1.

27 May 2016 Round 3	Ahane	1–21 – 0–08	Bruff	Claughaun
	T Morrissey 0–6, C Carroll 1–1, N Moran 0–4, M Carr 0–3, J Fox 0–3, K Enright 0–2, P O'Halloran 0–1, C Ryan 0–1.		S Bulfin 0–3, K Browne 0–2, P Browne 0–1, C Bulfin 0–1, C Browne 0–1.

29 May 2016 Round 3	Adare	0–23 – 2–12	Murroe/Boher	Childers Road
	W Griffin 0–12, D Hannon 0–3, J Fitzgibbon 0–2, M Mackey 0–2, E Ryan 0–1, N Mulvihill 0–1, C McCarthy 0–1, D Lyons 0–1.		P McNamara 2–6, P Tobin 0–3, C Byrnes 0–1, M Ryan 0–1.

29 May 2016 Round 3	Patrickswell	0–22 – 0–14	Knockainey	Bruff Grounds
	A Gillane 0–7, K O'Brien 0–4, L Considine 0–2, T O'Brien 0–2, D Byrnes 0–2, J Kelleher 0–1, C Lynch 0–1, B Foley 0–1, A Carroll 0–1, N Foley 0–1.		P Kirby 0–5, D Walsh 0–4, P Barron 0–3, L O'Shea 0–1, M Cleary 0–1.

20 August 2016 Round 4	Adare	3–23 – 1–04	Knockainey	FitzGerald Park
	W Griffin 0–12, J Fitzgibbon 1–4, M Macey 1–1, D Sexton 1–0, M Connolly 0–2, N Mulvihill 0–1, C McCarthy 0–1, D Connolly 0–1, D Lyons 0–1.		N Finch 1–1, P Kirby 0–2, K Cleary 0–1.

20 August 2016 Round 4	Patrickswell	0–25 – 1–09	Ahane	Gaelic Grounds
	A Gillane 0–6, L Considine 0–4, T O'Brien 0–4, P Harty 0–3, S O'Brien 0–3, J Kelleher 0–2, A Carroll 0–2, D Byrnes 0–1.		N Moran 1–1, J Meskell 0–3, O Moran 0–2, C Carroll 0–1, M Carr 0–1, S Power 0–1,

21 August 2016 Round 4	Bruff	2–13 – 1–13	Murroe/Boher	Fr Hayes Memorial Park
	P Browne 1–3, K Dillon 0–4, E Finn 1–0, C Browne 0–3, S Bulfin 0–3.		P McNamara 0–7, A Kennedy 1–0, P Tobin 0–2, J Casey 0–2, S Tobin 0–1, M Ryan 0–1.

11 September 2016 Round 5	Adare	3–18 – 1–09	Bruff	FitzGerald Park
	W Griffin 1–7, D Lyons 1–0, M Connolly 1–0, C McCarthy 0–3, J Fitzgibbon 0–3, D Hannon 0–2, M Mulvihill 0–1, A O'Connell 0–1, J English 0–1.		P O'Leary 1–1, C Browne 0–3, K Dillon 0–2, S Bulfin 0–2, P Browne 0–1.

11 September 2016 Round 5	Patrickswell	0–16 – 0–10	Murroe/Boher	Gaelic Grounds
	A Gillane 0–5, D Byrnes 0–3, T O'Brien 0–3, K O'Brien 0–1, A Carroll 0–1, B Foley 0–1, L Considine 0–1, C Lynch 0–1.		P McNamara 0–6, M Ryan 0–2, D Dunlea 0–1, S Tobin 0–1.

11 September 2016 Round 5	Knockainey	0–15 – 0–13	Ahane	Fr Hayes Memorial Park
	D Walsh 0–4, J Lonergan 0–2, L O'Shea 0–2, P Kirby 0–2, P Barron 0–2, K Cleary 0–1, N Finch 0–1, M Cleary 0–1.		J Fox 0–4, D Morrissey 0–2, C Carroll 0–2, T Morrissey 0–2, A Hackett 0–1, J Meskell 0–1, C O'Mara 0–1.

== Knockout stage ==
=== Quarter-finals ===
24 September 2016 Quarter-final	Patrickswell	1–25 – 3–15	Doon	Gaelic Grounds
	D Byrnes 0–6, T O'Brien 1–1, A Gillane 0–4, C Lynch 0–4, K O'Brien 0–3, J Kelleher 0–2, B Foley 0–1, L Considine 0–1, S O'Brien 0–1, N Foley 0–1, J Flynn 0–1.		B Murphy 0–8, P Ryan 1–1, M Barry 1–1, N Maher 1–1, D Coleman 0–1, P Cummins 0–1, M McKenna 0–1, M Ryan 0–1.	Referee: J Mullins (St. Kieran's)

24 September 2016 Quarter-final	Ahane	0–14 – 0–14	Ballybrown	Gaelic Grounds
	T Morrissey 0–10, J Fox 0–2, C Ryan 0–1, D Laing 0–1.		A O'Connor 0–9, L Doolan 0–3, D Kenny 0–1, D Hall 0–1.	Referee: J Murphy (Glenroe)

2 October 2016 Quarter-final replay	Ahane	2–13 – 1–20	Ballybrown	Gaelic Grounds
	T Morrissey 0–9, N Moran 1–1, M Carr 1–0, J Meskell 0–1, D Laing 0–1, O Moran 0–1.		A O'Connor 0–9, K Loftus 1–2, R Griffin 0–2, D Hall 0–2, J Adams 0–1, L Doran 0–1, L Doolan 0–1, A Cliffe 0–1, S Kenny 0–1.	Referee: M Sexton (Bruree)

=== Semi-finals ===
2 October 2016 Semi-final	Patrickswell	1–19 – 1–15	Kilmallock	Gaelic Grounds
	K O'Brien 1–2, T O'Brien 0–4, C Lynch 0–3, L Considine 0–3, A Gillane 0–2, D Byrnes 0–2, B Foley 0–2, S O'Brien 0–1.		R Egan 1–5, J Mulcahy 0–6, O O'Reilly 0–2, P O'Brien 0–1, P O'Loughlin 0–1.	Referee: J O'Mahony (Kildimo-Pallaskenry)

10 October 2016 Semi-final	Ballybrown	2–22 – 1–18	Adare	Gaelic Grounds
	A O'Connor 0–11, L Doolan 1–3, B Griffin 1–1, K Loftus 0–2, S Kenny 0–2, D Hall 0–1, D Kenny 0–1, A Cliffe 0–1.		W Griffin 1–8, J Fitzgibbon 0–8, W McNamara 0–1, C McCarthy 0–1.	Referee: D O'Driscoll (Ballinacurra Gaels)

=== Final ===
23 October 2016 Final	Patrickswell	1–26 – 1–07	Ballybrown	Gaelic Grounds
	A Gillane (0–7, 0–5 frees); D Byrnes (0–6, 0–5 frees); C Lynch (0–3); K O’Brien (1–0); S O’Brien, J Kelleher, B Foley, T O’Brien (0–2 each); M Carmody, L Considine (0–1 each).		S Foster (1–1); A O’Connor (0–4, 0–3 frees); L Doolan, K Loftus (0–1 each).

== Championship statistics ==
=== Top scorers ===
Rank	Player	Club	Tally	Total	Matches	Average
1	Alan O'Connor	Ballybrown	2–66	72	9	8.00
2	Willie Griffin	Adare	2–54	60	6	10.00]
3	Shane Dowling	Ballybrown	3–45	54	5	10.80
4	Aaron Gillane	Patrickswell	3–42	51	8	6.37
5	Brian Ryan	South Liberties	2–37	43	5	8.60
5	Paudie McNamara	Murroe/Boher	2–37	43	5	8.60
7	Tom Morrissey	Ahane	2–31	37	6	6.16
8	Barry Murphy	Doon	1–31	34	6	5.66
9	John Fitzgibbon	Patrickswell	2–25	31	6	5.16
10	Diarmaid Byrnes	Patrickswell	0–28	28	8	3.50
