= Aidan O'Connor (hurler) =

Irish hurler (born 2002)

Personal information
- Native name: Aodán Ó Conchúir (Irish)
- Born: 26 September 2002 (age 24) Clarina, County Limerick, Ireland
- Occupation: Student
- Height: 6 ft 0 in (183 cm)

Sport
- Sport: Hurling
- Position: Centre-forward
Club*
Years	Club	Apps (scores)
2020-present	Ballybrown	29 (10-219)
Club titles
- Limerick titles: 0
College
- Years: College
- 2021-present: University of Limerick
College titles
- Fitzgibbon titles: 2
Inter-county**
Years	County	Apps (scores)
2023-present	Limerick	17 (5-60)
Inter-county titles
- Munster titles: 3
- All-Irelands: 2
- NHL: 2
- All Stars: 1
- * club appearances and scores correct as of 20:05, 13 February 2022. **Inter County team apps and scores correct as of 00:02, 31 October 2026.

Aidan O'Connor (born 26 September 2002) is an Irish hurler. At club level, he plays with Ballybrown, while he is also a member of the Limerick senior hurling team. He usually lines out as a forward.

== Early life ==
Born and raised in Clarina, County Limerick, O'Connor was educated at Ardscoil Rís in Limerick. He played in all grades of hurling during his time there, including in the Dr Harty Cup.

During his studies at the University of Limerick (UL), O'Connor continued his hurling development. He won a league and championship double with the freshers' team in 2022. O'Connor later progressed to UL's Fitzgibbon Cup team and claimed a winners' medal in that competition in February 2025, following a 0–23 to 1–15 win over DCU Dóchas Éireann. He claimd a second consecutive winners' medal in 2026, when UL retained the title after a defeat of Mary Immaculate College in the final.

== Club career ==
O'Connor began his club career with Ballybrown, at a time when the club had multiple successes in the juvenile and underage grades. After winning the Limerick MAHC title in 2018, he won a Limerick Premier MHC title in 2019, following an 0–18 to 0–12 win over Doon in the final. O'Connor collected a second consecutive winners' medal in that competition in 2020, as Mungret were beaten by 3–23 to 0–20 . Ballybrown secured the Limerick Premier U19HC title in October 2021, with O'Connor captaining the team from midfield in the 2–30 to 1–17 win over Monaleen in the final. He added a Limerick Premier U21HC medal to his collection in 2022, after top-scoring in the seven-point win over Mungret. By this stage O'Connor had already joined the Ballybrown senior team and made his debut in July 2020 in a 4–18 to 2–14 win over Blackrock.

== Inter-county ==
O'Connor first appeared on the inter-county scene for Limerick during as a member of the minor team. He won a Munster MHC title in June 2019, following a 1–17 to 1–11 win over Clare in the final. O'Connor immediately progressed to the under-20 team and won a Munster U20HC in May 2022 following a four-point win over Tipperary. He was at centre-forward for Limerick's 0–19 to 0–18 defeat by Kilkenny in the 2022 All-Ireland U20HC final. O'Connor was Limerick's top scorer throughout the championship.

O'Connor made his senior team debut in a 1–27 to 1–15 National Hurling League defeat of Westmeath in March 2023. He ended the competition with a winners' medal, as a non-playing substitute in the 2–20 to 0–15 win over Kilkenny in the final. O'Connor later claimed his first Munster SHC medal, again as a substitute, as Limerick beat Clare by 1–23 to 1–22 to win a record-equalling fifth consecutive title. He was also an unused substitute when Limerick won a record-equalling fourth consecutive All-Ireland SHC title, following a 0–30 to 2–15 win over Kilkenny in the 2023 All-Ireland SHC final.

O'Connor came on as a substitute for David Reidy when Limerick won a record-breaking sixth consecutive Munster SHC title after a 1–26 to 1–20 win over Clare in the 2024 Munster SHC final. After a trophy-less 2025 season, Limerick regained the National League title with a six-point win over Cork in April 2026, with O'Connor claiming his second winners' medal. He also took over from Aaron Gillane as Limerick's primary free-taker for the season. O'Connor later collected a third Munster SHC medal, as Limerick also regained that title with a 1–21 to 2–17 win over Cork in the final. He won a second All-Ireland SHC medal, after scoring 0–3 from frees, in the 1–29 to 1–18 win over Galway in the 2026 All-Ireland SHC final.

== Career statistics ==
=== Club ===
As of 5 October 2025

Team	Year	Limerick SHC	
Team	Year	Apps	Score
Ballybrown	2020	3	1-05
Ballybrown	2021	3	1-22
Ballybrown	2022	5	1-41
Ballybrown	2023	5	2-26
Ballybrown	2024	6	3-60
Ballybrown	2025	7	2-65
Career total		29	10-219

=== Inter-county ===
As of 19 July 2026.

Team	Year	National League			Munster		All-Ireland		Total	
Team	Year	Division	Apps	Score	Apps	Score	Apps	Score	Apps	Score
Limerick	2023	Division 1A	2	0-01	0	0-00	0	0-00	2	0-01
Limerick	2024	Division 1A	1	0-00	3	0-01	1	0-00	5	0-01
Limerick	2025	Division 1A	6	0-14	5	1-03	1	0-03	12	1-20
Limerick	2026	Division 1A	7	1-63	5	3-39	2	1-14	14	5-116
Career total			16	1-78	13	4-43	4	1-17	33	6-136

== Honours ==
University of Limerick

- Fitzgibbon Cup (2): 2025, 2026

Ballybrown

- Limerick Premier Under-21 Hurling Championship (1): 2022
- Limerick Premier Under-19 Hurling Championship (1): 2021 (c)
- Limerick Premier Minor Hurling Championship (2): 2019, 2020
- Limerick Minor A Hurling Championship (1): 2018

Limerick

- All-Ireland Senior Hurling Championship (2): 2023, 2026
- Munster Senior Hurling Championship (3): 2023, 2024, 2026
- National Hurling League (2): 2023, 2026
- Munster Under-20 Hurling Championship (1): 2022
- Munster Minor Hurling Championship (1): 2019

Awards

- All-Star Award: 2026
