= 2023 Limerick Senior Hurling Championship =

Annual hurling competition in Limerick

- Dates: 4 August – 28 October 2023
- Teams: 12
- Sponsor: Bon Secours Hospital
- Champions: Na Piarsaigh (8th title); Mike Casey (captain); Shane O'Neill (manager)
- Runners-up: Patrickswell; Aaron Gillane (captain); Éamonn Kelly (manager)
- Relegated: Garryspillane

Tournament statistics
- Matches played: 35
- Goals scored: 111 (3.17 per match)
- Points scored: 1216 (34.74 per match)
- Top scorer(s): Aaron Gillane (7–52)

The 2023 Limerick Senior Hurling Championship was the 129th staging of the Limerick Senior Hurling Championship since its establishment by the Limerick County Board in 1887. The draws for the group stage pairings took place on 3 February 2023. The championship ran from 4 August to 28 October 2023.

Na Piarsaigh entered the championship as the defending champions.

The final was played on 28 October 2023 at the TUS Gaelic Grounds in Limerick, between Na Piarsaigh and Patrickswell, in what was their third meeting overall in the final and a first final meeting in four years. Na Piarsaigh won the match by 1–20 to 0–19 to claim their eighth championship title overall and a second title in succession. Patrickswell's Aaron Gillane was the championship's top scorer with 7–52.

As champions of Limerick, Na Piarsaigh progressed to the Munster Senior Club Hurling Championship where they lost in the semi-final to Ballygunner of Waterford.

== Team changes ==
=== To Championship ===
Promoted from the Limerick Premier Intermediate Hurling Championship

- Monaleen

=== From Championship ===
Relegated to the Limerick Premier Intermediate Hurling Championship

- Blackrock

== Group 1 ==
=== Group 1 table ===
Semi-finalists Quarter-finalists Relegated

Team	Matches				Score			Pts
Team	Pld	W	D	L	For	Against	Diff	Pts
Na Piarsaigh	5	4	0	1	124	82	42	8
Kilmallock	5	4	0	1	113	86	27	8
Doon	5	3	0	2	95	118	−23	6
Patrickswell	5	3	0	2	117	97	20	6
Ahane	5	1	0	4	91	109	−18	2
Kildimo-Pallaskenry	5	0	0	5	86	124	−38	0

=== Group 1 results ===
4 August 2023 Round 1	Patrickswell	2–15 – 1–16	Na Piarsaigh	Childers Road
	A Gillane 1–6 (0–5 frees); D Byrnes 0–4 (0-3f); C Carroll 1–1; C Lynch 0–2; T O’Brien, C Fitzgerald 0–1 each.	Report	R Lynch 0–6 (0–3 frees, 0–2 sidelines); P Casey 1–2; JJ Carey, Keith Dempsey 0–2 each; K Downes, A Breen, V Harrington, W Henn 0–1 each.	Referee: J O'Halloran (Bruree)

5 August 2023 Round 1	Kilmallock	3–22 – 0–12	Doon	Bruff Grounds
	O O'Reilly 2–3, M Houlihan 0–7, S O'Brien 0–5, R Egan 1–0, K Hayes 0–3, C Hanley 0–3, P O'Loughlin 0–1.		A English 0–10, J Ryan 0–1, E Stokes 0–1.	Referee: J Murphy (Glenroe)

5 August 2012 Round 1	Ahane	2–22 – 2–16	Kildimo-Pallaskenry	Cappamore Grounds
	T Morrissey 0–12, D Minehan 1–3, R Fox 1–2, M Donnellan 0–2, P Morrissey 0–1, C Carroll 0–1, J Butler 0–1.		S Barry 2–8, D O'Connell 0–2, C Downes 0–1, K Hayes 0–1, J O'Keeffe 0–1, L Griffin 0–1, C McMahon 0–1, P Nash 0–1.

10 August 2023 Round 2	Kilmallock	1–19 – 1–12	Ahane	Doon GAA Field
	M Houlihan 0–9, G O'Mahony 1–0, S O'Brien 0–3, P O'Reilly 0–2, O O'Reilly 0–2, C Staunton 0–2, P O'Loughlin 0–1.		T Morrissey 0–8, J Butler 1–0, R Fox 0–3, M Donnellan 0–1.

10 August 2023 Round 2	Doon	2–18 – 2–16	Patrickswell	FitzGerald Park
	P Ryan 1–3; A English 0–6 (0-5f); D Coughlan 0–5; K Maher 1–0; J Ryan 0–3; P Cummins 0–1.	Report	A Gillane 1–3 (1-3f); J Kirby 1–2; D Byrnes 0–4 (0-3f); C Lynch, M Carmody, J Higgins 0–2 each; C Fitzgerald 0–1.

11 August 2023 Round 2	Na Piarsaigh	1–23 – 1–14	Kildimo-Pallaskenry	Childers Road
	R Lynch 0–6, P Casey 0–5, A Breen 0–5, C Boylan 1–1, W Kearns 0–3, V Harrington 0–2, S Dowling 0–1.		S Barry 1–5, C McMahon 0–2, D O'Connell 0–2, K Hayes 0–2, L Griffin 0–2, D Fitzgerald 0–1.

31 August 2023 Round 3	Patrickswell	2–16 – 2–13	Ahane	FitzGerald Park
	A Gillane 1–5, J Higgins 1–1, C Lynch 0–2, M Carmody 0–2, K O'Brien 0–2, J Kirby 0–1, C Fitzgerald 0–1, D Byrnes 0–1, J Kelliher 0–1.	Report	T Morrissey 1–11, P Morrissey 1–0, M Donnellan 0–2.

1 September 2023 Round 3	Kildimo-Pallaskenry	0–13 – 1–17	Kilmallock	Newcastle West Grounds
	S Barry 0–8, K Hayes 0–1, D O'Connell 0–1, C McMahon 0–1, L Griffin 0–1, J Chawke 0–1.	Report	S O'Brien 1–4, M Houlihan 0–4, C Hanley-Clarke 0–4, O O'Reilly 0–2, R Egan 0–2, R Hanley 0–1.

2 September 2023 Round 3	Doon	0–16 – 4–23	Na Piarsaigh	Bruff Grounds
	A English 0–13, D Coughlan 0–1, C O'Donovan 0–1, P Ryan 0–1.	Report	R Lynch 1–7, A Breen 2–3, C Boylan 1–3, P Casey 0–5, W Kearns 0–1, K Dempsey 0–1, D Dempsey 0–1, S Dowling 0–1, E McEvoy 0–1.

6 September 2023 Round 4	Kildimo-Pallaskenry	0–17 – 2–18	Doon	FitzGerald Park
	S Barry 0–7, K Hayes 0–4, D O'Connell 0–3, P Nash 0–1, L Griffin 0–1, C Staff 0–1.		P Ryan 1–2, A English 0–4, J Ryan 1–0, D O'Donovan 0–3, K Maher 0–2, B Murphy 0–2, C Ryan 0–1, D Stapleton 0–1, E Stokes 0–1, D Coughlan 0–1, G Thomas 0–1.

7 September 2023 Round 4	Kilmallock	2–22 – 2–20	Patrickswell	Cappamore Grounds
	M Houlihan 0–7, O O'Reilly 1–3, S O'Brien 0–5, G Mulcahy 1–1, K Hayes 0–3, P O'Loughlin 0–2, K O'Donnell 0–1.		A Gillane 1–10, C Lynch 1–1, C Fitzgerald 0–2, P Kirby 0–1, J Kelliher 0–1, E Fitzgerald 0–1, J Flynn 0–1, J Kirby 0–1, J Higgins 0–1, D Byrnes 0–1.

7 September 2023 Round 4	Ahane	1–13 – 1–21	Na Piarsaigh	Childers Road
	T Morrissey 0–8, R Fox 1–4, K Morrissey 0–1.		R Lynch 0–10, JJ Carey 1–0, K Downes 0–3, A Breen 0–2, W Henn 0–2, P Casey 0–1, V Harrington 0–1, M Foley 0–1, D Dempsey 0–1.

23 September 2023 Round 5	Na Piarsaigh	0–20 – 1–09	Kilmallock	Doon GAA Field
	R Lynch 0–8, K Dempsey 0–3, A Breen 0–2, W Henn 0–2, C Boylan 0–1, S Dowling 0–1, JJ Carey 0–1, V Harrington 0–1, E McEvoy 0–1.		O O'Reilly 1–1, G Mulcahy 0–3, C Hanley-Clarke 0–2, R Egan 0–1, G O'Mahony 0–1, M Houlihan 0–1.

23 September 2023 Round 5	Doon	2–13 – 0–13	Ahane	Cappamore Grounds
	A English 1–6, D Stapleton 1–1, D O'Donovan 0–2, C Ryan 0–1, E Stokes 0–1, B Murphy 0–1, J Ryan 0–1.		T Morrissey 0–6, D Minehan 0–2, J Butler 0–1, M Donnellan 0–1, R Fox 0–1, N Moran 0–1, W Brennan 0–1.

23 September 2023 Round 5	Patrickswell	3–17 – 1–14	Kildimo-Pallaskenry	FitzGerald Park
	A Gillane 1–5, D Byrne 0–5, J Higgins 1–1, J Flynn 1–0, K O'Brien 0–2, E Fitzgerald 0–1, T O'Brien 0–1, J Kirby 0–1, J Considine 0–1.		S Barry 0–5, C McMahon 1–1, K Hayes 0–4, D O'Connell 0–3, C Staff 0–1.

== Group 2 ==
=== Group 2 table ===
Promoted, quarter-finalists Quarter-finalists Relegated

Team	Matches				Score			Pts
Team	Pld	W	D	L	For	Against	Diff	Pts
Mungret/St. Paul's	5	4	1	0	125	88	37	9
Ballybrown	5	3	1	1	134	106	28	7
Adare	5	3	1	1	116	90	26	7
Monaleen	5	2	0	3	99	104	−5	4
South Liberties	5	1	0	4	104	154	−50	2
Garryspillane	5	0	1	4	99	135	−36	1

=== Group 2 results ===
4 August 2023 Round 1	Monaleen	0–14 – 2–21	Ballybrown	Seán Finn Park
	M O'Dwyer 0–3, A La Touche Cosgrave 0–3, L Murphy 0–2, E O'Driscoll 0–2, S Griffin 0–1, L McHale 0–1, D Ó Dálaigh 0–1, J Fitzgerald 0–1.		A O'Connor 1–6, A Cliffe 0–8, B Adams 1–0, C Coughlan 0–2, B O'Connor 0–2, M Gavin 0–1, L O'Connor 0–1, R Griffin 0–1.

4 August 2023 Round 1	Mungret/St Paul's	4–19 – 0–13	South Liberties	Fedamore Grounds
	B Duff 2–2, P o'Brien 0–6, L Lynch 0–5, B Giltennane 1–1, N Mulcahy 1–1, F Fitzgerald 0–3, B O'Meara 0–1.		B Cooney 0–4, T Ryan 0–3, S Brosnahan 0–2, D Garry 0–1, B Garry 0–1, D Godfrey 0–1, K Byrnes 0–1.

4 August 2023 Round 1	Adare	4–11 – 1–11	Garryspillane	FitzGerald Park
	W Griffin 3–5, M Mackey 1–1, B O'Connor 0–2, J Fitzgibbon 0–2, J Hannon 0–1.		C Sheehan 1–2, D O'Shea 0–4, C Ryan 0–2, B Heavey 0–1, J English 0–1, G Power 0–1.	Referee: D O'Callaghan (Feohanagh)

11 August 2023 Round 2	Garryspillane	2–11 – 1–14	Mungret/St Paul's	Cappamore Grounds
	C Ryan 2–0, D O'Shea 0–3, C Sheehan 0–3, B Heavey 0–3, D Barry 0–1, R Donovan 0–1.		P O'Brien 0–8, B Duff 1–0, L Lynch 0–2, B O'Meara 0–1, F Fitzgerald 0–1, S Barry 0–1, B Giltennane 0–1.

12 August 2023 Round 2	South Liberties	0–14 – 2–24	Monaleen	Fr Hayes Memorial Park
	B Cooney 0–8 (0–7 frees), B Nash 0–2 (0–2 frees), T Ryan (0–1 s/l), D Garry, B Garry and R O'Mahony 0–1 each.	Report	D Ó Dálaigh and A La Touche Cosgrave (0–4 frees) 0–6 each, J Fitzgerald 0–5 (0–3 frees), L Murphy 1–1, M Field 1–0, L McHale 0–3, E O'Driscoll, L Lyons and B Crowe 0–1 each.

13 August 2023 Round 2	Ballybrown	1–17 – 1–17	Adare	Páirc na nGael
	A O'Connor 1–3, A Cliffe 0–6, L Doolin 0–2, L O'Connor 0–2, B O'Connor 0–1, C Coughlan 0–1, B Adams 0–1, K Power 0–1.		W Griffin 1–9, J Fitzgibbon 0–3, D O'Mahony 0–2, B O'Connor 0–1, R Connolly 0–1, M Mackey 0–1.

31 August 2023 Round 3	Mungret/St Paul's	1–23 – 2–17	Adare	Páirc na nGael
	L Lynch 0–6, N Mulcahy 1–2, P O'Brien 0–5, S Barry 0–4, B O'Meara 0–2, F Fitzgerald 0–2, B Barry 0–1, B Duff 0–1.	Report	J Fitzgibbon 0–9, W Griffin 0–4, S Hickey 1–0, D Hannon 1–0, C McCarthy 0–2, S Gleeson 0–1, M Keane 0–1.

31 August 2023 Round 3	Garryspillane	2–12 – 3–21	Monaleen	Fr Hayes Memorial Park
	D O'Shea 2–3, C Ryan 0–4, B Heavey 0–3, J English 0–1, P Morrissey 0–1.		M O'Dwyer 1–8, D Ó Dálaigh 2–4, L McHale 0–3, A La Touche Cosgrave 0–2, L Murphy 0–2, R Lyons 0–1, E Doyle 0–1.

31 August 2023 Round 3	South Liberties	2–17 – 5–21	Ballybrown	Fedamore Grounds
	B Nash 1–3, B Cooney 0–6, D Godfrey 1–1, K Byrnes 0–4, D Garry 0–1, T Ryan 0–1, A Heyes 0–1.		J Adams 3–3, C Coughlan 1–8, A Cliffe 1–4, M Gavin 0–2, J Adams 0–2, L Doolan 0–1, L O'Connor 0–1.

6 September 2023 Round 4	Adare	4–21 – 0–20	South Liberties	Moneteen Grounds
	J Fitzgibbon 2–5, W Griffin 1–6, D Hannon 1–1, S Hickey 0–3, S Heffernan 0–3, R Connolly 0–1, D O'Mahony 0–1, J Hannon 0–1.		D Garry 0–5, B Nash 0–4, T Ryan 0–3, B Cooney 0–2, K Byrnes 0–2, J Fitzpatrick 0–2, D Godfrey 0–1.

8 September 2023 Round 4	Ballybrown	3–22 – 4–14	Garryspillane	Fedamore Grounds
	A Cliffe 1–7, C Coughlan 1–3, B Adams 1–2, L O'Connor 0–4, A O'Connor 0–3, M Gavin 0–1, J Adams 0–1, D Hartnett 0–1.		C Ryan 1–5, K Hickey 2–0, B Heavey 0–5, J English 1–0, C Sheehan 0–2, M Quinlan 0–2.

8 September 2023 Round 4	Monaleen	0–15 – 1–25	Mungret/St. Paul's	Childers Road
	D Ó Dálaigh 0–4, A La Touche Cosgrave 0–3, J Fitzgerald 0–2, E O'Driscoll 0–2, L Lyons 0–2, D Power 0–1, L Murphy 0–1.		N Mulcahy 1–3, P O'Brien 0–6, F Fitzgerald 0–4, L Lynch 0–4, S Barry 0–2, B Barry 0–2, B Duff 0–2, B O'Meara 0–1, B Giltenane 0–1.

21 September 2023 Round 5	Garryspillane	2–18 – 7–13	South Liberties	Br Rice Field
	C Ryan 1–7 (0-6f); B Heavey 0–4 (0-3f); Calum Sheehan 1–1; J English 0–2; M Bourke, D O’Shea, D Barry, R Tobin 0–1 each.	Report	B Nash 2–5 (1-3f); T Ryan 2–2; B Cooney 1–2 (0-1f); D Godfrey 1–2; A Nash 1–0 (penalty); D Garry, J Fitzpatrick 0–1 each.

24 September 2023 Round 5	Adare	0–17 – 1–07	Monaleen	Bruff Sportsfield
	J Fitzgibbon 0–7, W Griffin 0–3, S Hickey 0–2, S Heffernan 0–2, D Hannon 0–1, S Gleeson 0–1, R Connolly 0–1.		L Lyons 1–2, J Fitzgerald 0–2, L Murphy 0–1, A La Touche Cosgrave 0–1, E O'Driscoll 0–1.

24 September 2023 Round 5	Mungret/St. Paul's	2–17 – 0–20	Ballybrown	Childers Road
	L Lynch 1–12, B Duff 1–0, B O'Meara 0–2, P O'Brien 0–2, P Begley 0–1.		A Cliffe 0–6, A O'Connor 0–5, L O'Connor 0–3, J Adams 0–2, R Griffin 0–1, L Doolan 0–1, C Coughlan 0–1, B Griffin 0–1.

== Knockout stage ==
=== Quarter-finals ===
1 October 2023 Quarter-final	Doon	1–25 – 0–21	Mungret/St. Paul's	TUS Gaelic Grounds
	A English (1–8, 0–7 frees, 0–1 65); P Ryan (0–4); K Maher, D Coughlan (0–3 each); B Murphy (0–2); D Stapleton, E Stokes, J Ryan, B Purcell, D O’Donovan (0–1 each).	Report	L Lynch (0–9, 6 frees, 1 65); N Mulcahy (0–4); B Duff (0–3); F Fitzgerald, P O’Brien (0–2 each); L Harrington (0–1).

1 October 2023 Quarter-final	Patrickswell	4–17 – 1–17	Ballybrown	TUS Gaelic Grounds
	A Gillane (1–4, 0–3 frees); T O’Brien, C Lynch (1–1 each); J Higgins, D Byrnes (1 free) (0–3 each); J Kirby (1–0); E Fitzgerald (0–2); J Kelleher, J Kirby, C Fitzgerald (0–1 each).	Report	A O’Connor (0–9, 6 frees, 1 65); C Coughlan (0–6, 1 free); L O’Connor (1–2).

=== Semi-finals ===
14 October 2023 Semi-final	Na Piarsaigh	2–23 – 0–29; Penalties: 4–3	Doon	TUS Gaelic Grounds
	R Lynch 0–11 (0–8 frees, 0–2 ‘65s); A Breen 2–0; P Casey 0–4; D Dempsey, JJ Carey 0–2 each; C Boylan, W Kearns, V Harrington, J Fitzgerald 0–1 each.	Report	A English 0–12 (0–8 frees) D O’Donovan 0–5 (0–2 frees); P Ryan 0–4 (0–1 free); J Ryan 0–3; C O’Donovan 0–2; D Stapleton, J Cummins, K Maher 0–1 each.	Referee: J Murphy (Glenroe)

15 October 2023 Semi-final	Kilmallock	2–15 – 2–25	Patrickswell	TUS Gaelic Grounds
	M Houlihan (0–7, 5fs, 1 65), R Hanley (2–0), K O’Donnell, P O’Loughlin (2fs), S O’Brien (0–2 each), K Hayes, O O’Reilly (0–1 each).	Report	A Gillane (1–12, 8fs), C Lynch (0–3), J Kirby (1–0), T O’Brien (0–2), D Byrnes 0–3 (2fs), K O’Brien, C Fitzgerald, J Higgins, E Fitzgerald, P Kirby (0–1 each).	Referee: J O'Halloran (Bruree)

=== Final ===
28 October 2023 Final	Na Piarsaigh	1–20 – 0–19	Patrickswell	TUS Gaelic Grounds
	R Lynch 0–8 (7 free), P Casey 1–1, K Downes 0–4, D Dempsey 0–2, C Boylan 0–2, M Foley 0–1, W Henn 0–1, JJ Carey 0–1.	Report	A Gillane 0–7 (5 frees), J Kelleher 0–4 (1 sideline), D Byrnes 0–2 (2 frees), K O’Brien 0–2, M Carmody 0–1, J Flynn 0–1, C Carroll 0–1, E Fitzgerald 0–1.	Referee: M Sexton (Bruree)

== Championship statistics ==
=== Top scorers ===
Overall

Rank	Player	County	Tally	Total	Matches	Average
1	Aaron Gillane	Patrickswell	7–52	73	8	9.12
2	Adam English	Doon	2–59	65	7	9.28
3	Ronan Lynch	Na Piarsaigh	1–56	59	7	8.42
4	Tom Morrissey	Ahane	1–45	48	5	9.60
5	Willie Griffin	Adare	5–27	42	5	8.40
5	Shaun Barry	Kildimo/Pallaskenry	3–33	42	5	8.40
7	Liam Lynch	Mungret/St Paul's	1–38	41	6	6.83
8	Andy Cliffe	Ballybrown	2–31	37	5	7.20
9	Micheál Houlihan	Kilmallock	0–35	35	6	5.83
10	John Fitzgibbon	Adare	2–26	32	5	6.40
10	Aidan O'Connor	Ballybrown	2–26	32	5	6.40

Single game

Rank	Player	Club	Tally	Total	Opposition
1	Aaron Gillane	Patrickswell	1–12	15	Kilmallock
1	Liam Lynch	Mungret/St Paul's	1–12	15	Ballybrown
3	Willie Griffin	Adare	3–05	14	Garryspillane
3	Shaun Barry	Kildimo/Pallaskenry	2–08	14	Ahane
3	Tom Morrissey	Ahane	1–11	14	Patrickswell
6	Aaron Gillane	Patrickswell	1–10	13	Kilmallock
6	Adam English	Doon	0–13	13	Na Piarsaigh
8	Josh Adams	Ballybrown	3–03	12	South Liberties
8	Willie Griffin	Adare	1–09	12	Ballybrown
8	Adam English	Doon	0–12	12	Na Piarsaigh
8	Tom Morrissey	Ahane	0–12	12	Kildimo/Pallaskenry
