= Willie Moore (Limerick hurler) =

Irish hurler

Personal information
- Native name: Liam Ó Mordha (Irish)
- Born: 1950 (age 75–76) Doon, County Limerick, Ireland
- Occupation: Teacher
- Height: 5 ft 10 in (178 cm)

Sport
- Sport: Hurling
- Position: Right corner-back
Club
- Years: Club
- Doon
Club titles
- Limerick titles: 0
Inter-county*
Years	County	Apps (scores)
1971-1974	Limerick	9 (0-00)
Inter-county titles
- Munster titles: 2
- All-Irelands: 1
- NHL: 0
- All Stars: 0
- *Inter County team apps and scores correct as of 20:25, 1 December 2011.

William Moore (born 1950) is an Irish retired hurler who played as a right corner-back for the Limerick senior hurling team.

Moore made his first appearance for the team during the 1971 championship and became a regular player over the next few seasons. During that time he won one All-Ireland winners' medal and back-to-back Munster winners' medals.

At club level Moore enjoyed a lengthy career with Doon, however, he ended his career without claiming a county club championship winners' medal.

== Playing career ==
=== Club ===
Moore played his club hurling with his local Doon club.

=== Inter-county ===
Moore first came to prominence as a member of the Limerick senior inter-county team in the early 1970s. In 1973 he won his first Munster Championship medal, Limerick's first since 1955. Limerick later faced Kilkenny in the All-Ireland final, however, the Munster champions were burdened with the underdogs tag. In spite of this Limerick powered to a seven-point victory, giving Moore an All-Ireland medal.

In 1974 Moore won a second consecutive Munster title before lining out in a second consecutive All-Ireland final. Once again Kilkenny provided the opposition. Limerick stormed to an early lead, however, a Pat Delaney shot from midfield bounced on the wet Croke Park surface and between goalkeeper Séamus Horgan's legs for a goal. Two more goals for Kilkenny put an end to Limerick's hopes of victory as 'the Cats' emerged the winners by twelve points.

Horgan continued hurling at inter-county level until 1974.
