= Adam English =

Irish hurler (born 2003)

Personal information
- Native name: Adam Mac an Bhearlaigh (Irish)
- Born: 25 March 2003 (age 23) Doon, County Limerick, Ireland
- Occupation: Business manager
- Height: 5 ft 11 in (180 cm)

Sport
- Sport: Hurling
- Position: Midfield
Club
Years	Club	Apps (scores)
2022-present	Doon	5 (0-34)
Club titles
- Limerick titles: 1
College
- Years: College
- 2021-2025: University of Limerick
College titles
- Fitzgibbon titles: 2
Inter-county*
Years	County	Apps (scores)
2022-present	Limerick	20 (2-34)
Inter-county titles
- Munster titles: 4
- All-Irelands: 3
- NHL: 2
- All Stars: 1
- *Inter County team apps and scores correct as of 23:57, 30 October 2026.

Adam English (born 25 March 2003) is an Irish hurler. At club level, he plays with Doon and at inter-county level with the Limerick senior hurling team.

== Early life ==
Born and raised in Doon, County Limerick, English was educated at Scoil na Trionóide Naofa. He played in all grades of hurling during his time there and won a Munster PPS U15BHC title as joint-captain in 2018.

During his studies at the University of Limerick (UL), English continued his hurling development. He won a Fitzgibbon Cup medal in February 2023, after scoring two points in the 4–19 to 1–13 win over University of Galway in the final. English claimed a second Fitzgibbon Cup medal two years later, following a 0–23 to 1–15 win over DCU Dóchas Éireann.

== Club career ==
English began his club career at juvenile and underage levels with Doon. He was part of the club's under-21 team that won three consecutive Limerick Premier U21HC titles between 2019 and 2021. English made his senior team debut in September 2021 in a 0–27 to 1–23 win over Na Piarsaigh. He won a Limerick SHC medal in October 2024, after scoring 0–11 in the one-point win over Na Piarsaigh in the final.

== Inter-county career ==
English first appeared on the inter-county scene for Limerick during a two-year tenure with the minor team. He won a Munster MHC title in June 2019, following a 1–17 to 1–11 win over Clare in the final. English captained the team to a second consecutive Munster MHC title in December 2020, when Limerick beat Tipperary in extra time by 2–22 to 0–25 in a COVID-delayed Munster MHC final. English immediately progressed to the under-20 team and won a Munster U20HC in May 2022 following a four-point win over Tipperary. He was at right wing-forward for Limerick's 0–19 to 0–18 defeat by Kilkenny in the 2022 All-Ireland U20HC final.

English made his senior team debut in a 0–27 to 1–18 National Hurling League defeat by Galway in February 2022. His membership of the under-20 team impacted on his senior team appearances that season. Limerick retained the Munster SHC title for a fourth consecutive year in June 2022, with English being an extended panel member for the 1–29 to 0–29 extra-time win over Clare. He later won his first All-Ireland SHC medal, again as an extended panel member, in the 1–31 to 2–26 win over Kilkenny in the 2022 All-Ireland SHC final.

English won his first National League medal in April 2023, again as a substitute, in the 2–20 to 0–15 win over Kilkenny in the final. He later claimed his second Munster SHC medal, his first on the field of play, as Limerick beat Clare by 1–23 to 1–22 to win a record-equalling fifth consecutive title. English was an unused substitute when Limerick won a record-equalling fourth consecutive All-Ireland SHC title, following a 0–30 to 2–15 win over Kilkenny in the 2023 All-Ireland SHC final.

English came on as a substitute for Cian Lynch when Limerick won a record-breaking sixth consecutive Munster SHC title after a 1–26 to 1–20 win over Clare in the 2024 Munster SHC final. After a trophy-less 2025 season, Limerick regained the National League title with a six-point win over Cork in April 2026, with English claiming his second winners' medal. He later collected a fourth Munster SHC medal as Limerick also regained that title with a 1–21 to 2–17 win over Cork in the final. English won a third All-Ireland SHC medal, after lining out at midfield, in the 1–29 to 1–18 win over Galway in the 2026 All-Ireland SHC final.

== Career statistics ==
=== Club ===
As of 19 October 2025.

Team	Year	Limerick		Munster		All-Ireland		Total	
Team	Year	Apps	Score	Apps	Score	Apps	Score	Apps	Score
Doon	2021	3	0-31	—		—		3	0-31
Doon	2022	2	0-07	—		—		2	0-07
Doon	2023	7	2-59	—		—		7	2-59
Doon	2024	7	2-58	1	0-10	—		8	2-68
Doon	2025	7	1-55	—		—		7	1-55
Career total		26	5-210	1	0-10	—		27	5-220

=== Inter-county ===
As of 19 July 2026.

Team	Year	National League			Munster		All-Ireland		Total	
Team	Year	Division	Apps	Score	Apps	Score	Apps	Score	Apps	Score
Limerick	2022	Division 1A	3	0-01	0	0-00	0	0-00	3	0-01
Limerick	2023	Division 1A	3	0-02	1	0-01	1	0-00	5	0-05
Limerick	2024	Division 1A	5	0-24	5	0-07	1	0-02	11	0-33
Limerick	2025	Division 1A	6	0-11	4	2-10	1	0-05	11	2-26
Limerick	2026	Division 1A	7	0-15	5	0-06	2	0-03	14	0-24
Career total			24	0-53	15	2-24	5	0-10	44	2-90

== Honours ==
Scoil na Trionóide Naofa

- Munster PPS Under-15 B Hurling Championship (1)L 2018

University of Limerick

- Fitzgibbon Cup (2): 2023, 2025

Doon

- Limerick Senior Hurling Championship (1): 2024
- Limerick Premier Under-21 Hurling Championship (3): 2019, 2020, 2021

Limerick

- All-Ireland Senior Hurling Championship (3): 2022, 2023, 2026
- Munster Senior Hurling Championship (4): 2022, 2023, 2024, 2026
- National Hurling League (2): 2023, 2026
- Munster Under-20 Hurling Championship (1): 2022
- Munster Minor Hurling Championship (2): 2019 (c), 2020

Awards

- All-Star Award: 2026
