= Willie Gleeson =

Irish hurler

Personal information
- Native name: Liam Ó Gliasáin (Irish)
- Born: 1893 Fedamore, County Limerick, Ireland
- Died: Unknown
- Occupation: Carpenter

Sport
- Sport: Hurling
- Position: Midfield
Club
- Years: Club
- 1912-1932: Fedamore
Club titles
- Limerick titles: 4
Inter-county
- Years: County
- 1915-1928: Limerick
Inter-county titles
- Munster titles: 3
- All-Irelands: 2
- NHL: 0

William Joseph Gleeson (1893 – 18 November 1975) was an Irish hurler who played as a midfielder for the Limerick senior team.

== Career ==
Gleeson made his first appearance for the team during the 1915 championship and became a regular player over the next decade. During that time he won two All-Ireland winner's medals and three Munster winner's medals

At club level, Gleeson played with Fedamore and Young Irelands and won four county championship winners' medals in a career that spanned three decades.

Gleeson also won a Railway Cup winners' medal when he was chosen on the first two Munster inter-provincial teams and also represented Ireland in the Tailteann Games.

In retirement from playing Gleeson enjoyed a distinguished career as a referee while he was also a long-serving representative with the Munster Council.
