= Mikey O'Brien =

Irish hurler

Personal information
- Native name: Mícheál Ó Briain (Irish)
- Born: 1999 (age 26–27) Doon, County Limerick, Ireland
- Occupation: Student

Sport
- Sport: Hurling
- Position: Left wing-back
Club
- Years: Club
- Doon
Club titles
- Limerick titles: 0
Inter-county*
| Years | County | Apps (scores) |
| 2019- | Limerick | 0 (0-00) |
Inter-county titles
- Munster titles: 0
- All-Irelands: 0
- NHL: 0
- All Stars: 0
- *Inter County team apps and scores correct as of 19:06, 23 February 2019.

Michael O'Brien (born 1999) is an Irish hurler who plays for the Limerick Senior Championship club Doon and at inter-county level with the Limerick senior hurling team. He usually lines out as a left wing-back.

== Honours ==
Doon

- Limerick Premier Minor Hurling Championship (1): 2015
