= Barry Murphy (Limerick hurler) =

Irish hurler

Personal information
- Native name: Barra Ó Murchú (Irish)
- Nickname: Blocks
- Born: 25 February 1997 (age 29) Doon, County Limerick, Ireland
- Occupation: Student
- Height: 6 ft 0 in (183 cm)

Sport
- Sport: Hurling
- Position: Centre-forward
Club
- Years: Club
- Doon
Club titles
- Limerick titles: 1
College
- Years: College
- University of Limerick
College titles
- Fitzgibbon titles: 1
Inter-county*
Years	County	Apps (scores)
2018-	Limerick	12 (1-01)
Inter-county titles
- Munster titles: 3
- All-Irelands: 3
- NHL: 2
- All Stars: 0
- *Inter County team apps and scores correct as of 19:34, 21 June 2025.

Barry Murphy (born 25 February 1997) is an Irish hurler who plays as a centre-forward for club side Doon and at inter-county level with the Limerick senior hurling team.

== Playing career ==
=== College ===
Murphy first came to prominence as a hurler with Scoil na Trionóide in Doon. Having played in every grade as a hurler, he eventually joined the school's senior team. On 22 February 2014, Murphy was at left corner-forward when Ardscoil Rís defeated Scoil na Trionóide by 2–13 to 0–04 in the final of the Harty Cup.

=== University ===
During his studies at the University of Limerick, Murphy was selected for the college's senior hurling team for the Fitzgibbon Cup.

=== Club ===
Murphy joined the Doon club at a young age and played in all grades at juvenile and underage levels, enjoying championship success in under-12, under-14 and under-15 grades. As a member of the club's minor team, he also enjoyed championship success before joining the club's senior team.

=== Inter-county ===
==== Minor and under-21 ====
Murphy first played for Limerick at minor level. On 22 July 2014, he was an unused substitute when Limerick won their second successive Munster Championship title after a 0–24 to 0–18 defeat of Waterford in the final. On 7 September 2014, Murphy was introduced as a substitute for Thomas Grimes in Limerick's 2–17 to 0–19 defeat by Kilkenny in the All-Ireland final.

Murphy's second and final season with the Limerick minor hurling team ended with an All-Ireland quarter-final defeat by Galway.

Murphy subsequently joined the Limerick under-21 hurling team in 2016 and played during the team's unsuccessful championship campaign. In his second season with the team he won a Munster Championship medal after coming on as a substitute for Tom Morrissey in Limerick's 0–16 to 1–11 defeat of Cork in the final. On 9 September 2017, Murphy was named at centre-forward for Limerick's 0–17 to 0–11 defeat of Kilkenny in the All-Ireland final.

==== Senior ====
Murphy joined the Limerick senior hurling panel in 2018 and made his first appearance for the team during the pre-season Munster League. He made his first appearance in the National Hurling League on 28 January 2018 after being introduced as a 46th-minute substitute for Gearóid Hegarty in a 1–25 to 0–18 defeat of Laois. He made his Munster Championship debut on 20 May 2018 and scored a goal in a 1–23 to 2–14 defeat of Tipperary. On 19 August 2018, Murphy was a member of the extended panel when Limerick won their first All-Ireland title in 45 years after a 3–16 to 2–18 defeat of Galway in the final.

On 31 March 2019, Murphy started Limerick's National League final meeting with Waterford on the bench. He was introduced as a 64th-minute substitute for Aaron Gillane and collected a winners' medal following the 1–24 to 0–19 victory. On 2 June 2019, Murphy sustained a bad hamstring injury in the final minutes of Limerick's Munster Championship defeat of Waterford. After undergoing a number of scans and an operation, Murphy was later ruled out for the rest of season.

== Career statistics ==
As of match played 21 June 2025.

Team	Year	National League			Munster		All-Ireland		Total	
Team	Year	Division	Apps	Score	Apps	Score	Apps	Score	Apps	Score
Limerick	2018	Division 1B	6	0-01	3	1-00	0	0-00	9	1-01
Limerick	2019	Division 1A	6	0-11	2	0-01	0	0-00	8	0-12
Limerick	2020	Division 1A	0	0-00	0	0-00	0	0-00	0	0-00
Limerick	2021	Division 1A	1	0-02	0	0-00	1	0-00	2	0-02
	2022		0	0-00	0	0-00	0	0-00	0	0-00
	2023		5	0-04	0	0-00	1	0-00	6	0-04
	2024		5	0-01	0	0-00	0	0-00	5	0-01
	2025		4	0-00	4	0-00	1	0-00	10	0-00
Career total			27	0-19	9	1-01	3	0-00	39	1-20

== Honours ==
Limerick

- All-Ireland Senior Hurling Championship (1): 2018
- National Hurling League (1): 2019
- Munster Senior Hurling League (1): 2018
- All-Ireland Under-21 Hurling Championship (1): 2017
- Munster Under-21 Hurling Championship (1): 2017
- Munster Minor Hurling Championship (1): 2014
