= Tom Morrissey (hurler) =

Irish hurler

Personal information
- Native name: Tomás Ó Muireasa (Irish)
- Born: 29 May 1996 (age 30) Castleconnell, County Limerick, Ireland
- Occupation: Tax assistant
- Height: 6 ft 0 in (183 cm)

Sport
- Sport: Hurling
- Position: Left wing-forward
Club*
Years	Club	Apps (scores)
2023-present	Ahane	64 (30-462)
Club titles
- Limerick titles: 0
College
- Years: College
- 2014–2019: University of Limerick
College titles
- Fitzgibbon titles: 1
Inter-county**
Years	County	Apps (scores)
2015–present	Limerick	60 (2–146)
Inter-county titles
- Munster titles: 7
- All-Irelands: 6
- NHL: 3
- All Stars: 3
- * club appearances and scores correct as of 16:17, 2 April 2026. **Inter County team apps and scores correct as of 22:33, 19 July 2026.

Thomas Morrissey (born 29 May 1996) is an Irish hurler who plays as a left wing-forward for club side Ahane and at inter-county level with the Limerick senior hurling team.

== Early life ==
Morrissey was born in Castleconnell, County Limerick. His brother, Dan Morrissey, also plays for Ahane and the Limerick senior hurling team.

== Playing career ==
=== University ===
During his studies at the University of Limerick, Morrissey was selected for the college's senior hurling team. On 24 February 2018, he won a Fitzgibbon Cup medal following UL's 2–21 to 2–15 defeat of Dublin City University in the final.

=== Club ===
Morrissey joined the Ahane club at a young age and played in all grades at juvenile and underage levels, winning a championship medal in the minor grade in 2014. He later joined the club's senior team.

=== Inter-county ===
==== Minor and under-21 ====
Morrissey first played for the Limerick minor hurling team at the age of seventeen. On 23 July 2013, he scored three points from play when Limerick won their first Munster Championship title in 29 years after a 1–20 to 4–08 defeat of Waterford in a replay of the final.

Morrissey was eligible for the minor grade again the following year and won a second successive Munster Championship medal after a 0–24 to 0–18 second successive defeat of Waterford in a replay of the final. On 7 September 2014, Morrissey was at full-forward for Limerick's 2–17 to 0–19 defeat by Kilkenny in the All-Ireland final.

Morrissey subsequently joined the Limerick under-21 hurling team and won a Munster Championship medal in his first season after a 0–22 to 0–19 win over Clare in the final. On 12 September 2015, Morrissey was at full-forward when Limerick defeated Wexford by 0–26 to 1–07 in the All-Ireland final. He ended the season by being named on the Bord Gáis Energy Team of the Year.

After surrendering their title in 2016, Morrissey won a second Munster Championship medal as captain the following year after a 0–16 to 1–11 defeat of Cork in the final. On 9 September 2017, Morrissey captained Limerick to a 0–17 to 0–11 defeat of Kilkenny in the All-Ireland final.

==== Senior ====
Morrissey was added to the Limerick senior hurling panel in advance of the 2015 season. He made his senior debut for Limerick on 14 February 2015, replacing Niall Moran in the 47th minute of a National Hurling League draw with Waterford at the Gaelic Grounds.

On 19 August 2018, Morrissey was at left wing-forward when Limerick won their first All-Ireland title in 45 years after a 3–16 to 2–18 defeat of Galway in the final. Later that day he was named on The Sunday Game Team of the Year. Morrissey ended the season by being nominated for an All-Star Award.

On 31 March 2019, Morrissey was selected at left wing-forward for Limerick's National League final meeting with Waterford at Croke Park. He collected a winners' medal after scoring a point from play in the 1–24 to 0–19 victory. On 30 June 2019, Morrissey won a Munster Championship medal after scoring four points from left wing-forward in Limerick's 2–26 to 2–14 defeat of Tipperary in the final.

== Career statistics ==
=== Club ===
As of 13 September 2025.

Team	Year	Limerick SHC	
Team	Year	Apps	Score
Ahane	2013	4	3-02
Ahane	2014	6	2-13
Ahane	2015	7	1-08
Ahane	2016	6	2-31
Ahane	2017	4	2-37
Ahane	2018	5	0-48
Ahane	2019	6	0-53
Ahane	2020	3	1-29
Ahane	2021	3	2-30
Ahane	2022	5	3-57
Ahane	2023	5	1-45
Ahane	2025	5	2-53
Ahane	2025	5	1-56
Career total		64	30-462

=== Inter-county ===
As of 19 July 2026.

Team	Year	National League			Munster		All-Ireland		Total	
Team	Year	Division	Apps	Score	Apps	Score	Apps	Score	Apps	Score
Limerick	2015	Division 1B	4	0-02	0	0-00	0	0-00	4	0-02
Limerick	2016	Division 1B	7	0–14	1	1-00	1	0-00	9	1–14
Limerick	2017	Division 1B	3	1-03	1	0-00	1	0-00	5	1-03
Limerick	2018	Division 1B	6	0–14	4	0–13	4	1–11	14	1–38
Limerick	2019	Division 1A	7	0-06	5	0–12	1	0-01	13	0–19
Limerick	2020	Division 1A	5	0–16	3	0-06	2	0–11	10	0–33
Limerick	2021	Division 1A	5	0–10	2	0-04	2	0-08	9	0–22
Limerick	2022	Division 1A	5	0-04	4	0–11	2	0-05	12	0–20
Limerick	2023	Division 1A	5	0–20	5	0–16	2	0-03	12	0–39
Limerick	2024	Division 1A	5	1–11	5	0–13	1	0-02	11	1–26
Limerick	2025	Division 1A	4	0-07	5	0–18	1	0-02	10	0–27
Limerick	2026	Division 1A	5	0-04	5	0-10	2	0-00	12	0-14
Total			61	2–111	41	1–103	19	1–43	121	4–258

== Honours ==
Ahane

- Limerick Minor Hurling Championship: 2014

Limerick

- All-Ireland Senior Hurling Championship: 2018, 2020, 2021, 2022, 2023
- Munster Senior Hurling Championship: 2019, 2020, 2021, 2022, 2023
- National Hurling League: 2019, 2020, 2023
- All-Ireland Under-21 Hurling Championship: 2015, 2017 (c)
- Munster Under-21 Hurling Championship: 2015, 2017 (c)
- Munster Minor Hurling Championship: 2013, 2014

Awards

- The Sunday Game Team of the Year (4): 2018, 2020, 2021, 2023
- GAA-GPA All-Star Award (3): 2020, 2021, 2023

Sporting positions
Preceded by Declan Hannon	Limerick Senior Hurling Captain; 2019	Succeeded by Declan Hannon
Achievements
Preceded by Patrick Curran; Adam Farrell	All-Ireland Under-21 Hurling Final winning captain 2017	Succeeded by Colin English
