= Glengar GAA =

- County: Tipperary
- Colours: Green and yellow
- Grounds: Glengar

Glengar GAA is a Gaelic Athletic Association club located in Glengar in County Tipperary, Ireland.

== Achievements ==
- West Tipperary Senior Hurling Championship (1) 1957 (St. Nicholas -included Glengar, Cappa & Solohead),
- West Tipperary Minor A Hurling Championship (2) 1932 (as Hollyford/Glengar), 1942 (Sean Treacy's - included Hollyford)
