= Darragh O'Donovan =

Irish hurler (born 1995)

Personal information
- Native name: Darragh Ó Donnabháin (Irish)
- Born: 9 May 1995 (age 31) Oola, County Limerick, Ireland
- Height: 5 ft 11 in (180 cm)

Sport
- Sport: Hurling
- Position: Midfield
Clubs
- Years: Club
- Doon; Oola
Club titles
- Limerick titles: 1
College
- Years: College
- 2014-2017: Mary Immaculate College
College titles
- Fitzgibbon titles: 2
Inter-county*
| Years | County | Apps (scores) |
| 2016-present | Limerick | 50 (1-33) |
Inter-county titles
- Munster titles: 7
- All-Irelands: 6
- NHL: 4
- All Stars: 2
- *Inter County team apps and scores correct as of 23:10, 19 July 2026.

Darragh O'Donovan (born 9 May 1995) is an Irish hurler who plays as a midfielder for club side Doon and at inter-county level with the Limerick senior hurling team.

== Playing career ==
=== University ===
During his studies at Mary Immaculate College, O'Donovan was selected at midfield for the college's senior hurling team during his second year. On 27 February 2016, he won a Fitzgibbon Cup medal as Mary I won their first ever title after a 1–30 to 3–22 defeat of the University of Limerick. O'Donovan was at right wing-forward when Mary I retained the title in 2017 following a 3–24 to 1–19 defeat of Carlow Institute of Technology.

=== Club ===
O'Donovan joined the Doon club at a young age and played in all grades at juvenile and underage levels, enjoying championship success in under-12, under-14 and under-15 grades. As a member of the club's minor team, he won back-to-back championship medals in 2012 and 2013 following respective defeats of Patrickswell and Na Piarsaigh. O'Donovan subsequently made his senior championship debut for the club.

=== Inter-county ===
==== Minor and under-21 ====
O'Donovan first played for Limerick at minor level. On 23 July 2013, he was at midfield when Limerick won their first Munster Championship title in 29 years after a 1–20 to 4–08 defeat of Waterford.

O'Donovan joined the Limerick under-21 hurling team in 2014. In his second season he won a Munster Championship medal after a 0–22 to 0–19 win over Clare in the final. On 12 September 2015, O'Donovan was at midfield when Limerick defeated Wexford in the All-Ireland final. He ended the season by being named on the Bord Gáis Energy Team of the Year.

==== Senior ====
O'Donovan made his senior debut for Limerick on 13 February 2016 in a National League defeat of Wexford. Later that season he made his first championship start in a 1–24 to 0–18 defeat by Westmeath.

O'Donovan missed most of the 2018 National League after sustaining a broken finger. On 19 August 2018, O'Donovan scored a point from midfield when Limerick won their first All-Ireland title in 45 years after a 3–16 to 2–18 defeat of Galway in the final. O'Donovan ended the season by being nominated for an All-Star Award.

On 31 March 2019, O'Donovan was selected at midfield for Limerick's National League final meeting with Waterford at Croke Park. He collected a winners' medal after scoring a point from a line ball in the 1–24 to 0–19 victory. On 30 June 2019, O'Donovan won a Munster Championship medal as a non-playing substitute following Limerick's 2–26 to 2–14 defeat of Tipperary in the final.

== Career statistics ==
As of match played 19 July 2026.

| Team | Year | National League | | | Munster | | All-Ireland | | Total | |
| Team | Year | Division | Apps | Score | Apps | Score | Apps | Score | Apps | Score |
|---|---|---|---|---|---|---|---|---|---|---|
| Limerick | 2016 | Division 1B | 4 | 0-02 | 0 | 0-00 | 2 | 0-02 | 6 | 0-04 |
| Limerick | 2017 | Division 1B | 3 | 0-01 | 0 | 0-00 | 1 | 0-00 | 4 | 0-01 |
| Limerick | 2018 | Division 1B | 2 | 0-03 | 4 | 0-05 | 4 | 0-06 | 10 | 0-14 |
| Limerick | 2019 | Division 1B | 8 | 0-06 | 3 | 0-03 | 1 | 0-00 | 12 | 0-09 |
| Limerick | 2020 | Division 1B | 5 | 0-05 | 3 | 0-00 | 2 | 0-00 | 10 | 0-05 |
| Limerick | 2021 | Division 1B | 5 | 0-03 | 2 | 1-00 | 2 | 0-02 | 9 | 1-05 |
| | 2022 | | 4 | 0-02 | 5 | 0-04 | 2 | 0-00 | 11 | 0-06 |
| | 2023 | | 6 | 0-03 | 5 | 0-04 | 2 | 0-02 | 13 | 0-09 |
| | 2024 | | 2 | 0-01 | 0 | 0-00 | 1 | 0-00 | 3 | 0-01 |
| | 2025 | | 1 | 0-00 | 4 | 0-01 | 0 | 0-00 | 5 | 0-01 |
| | 2026 | | 5 | 0-01 | 5 | 0-03 | 2 | 0-00 | 12 | 0-04 |
| Career total | | | 45 | 0-27 | 31 | 1-20 | 19 | 0-12 | 95 | 1-59 |

== Honours ==
=== Player ===
Mary Immaculate College

- Fitzgibbon Cup (2): 2016, 2017

Doon

- Limerick Senior Hurling Championship (1): 2024 (c)
- Limerick Minor Hurling Championship (2): 2012, 2013

Limerick

- All-Ireland Senior Hurling Championship: 2018, 2020, 2021, 2022, 2023
- Munster Senior Hurling Championship: 2019, 2020, 2021, 2022, 2023
- National Hurling League: 2019, 2020, 2023
- All-Ireland Under-21 Hurling Championship (1): 2015
- Munster Under-21 Hurling Championship (1): 2015
- Munster Minor Hurling Championship (1): 2013

Awards

- The Sunday Game Team of the Year (1): 2023
- GAA/GPA All-Star (2): 2021, 2023

=== Management ===
Abbey CBS

- All-Ireland PPS Senior B Hurling Championship (1): 2016
- Munster PPS Senior B Hurling Championship (1): 2016
