= Matthew Fitzgerald =

Irish hurler

Personal information
- Native name: Maitiú Mac Gearailt (Irish)
- Born: 2006 (age 19–20) Monaleen, County Limerick, Ireland
- Occupation: Student

Sport
- Sport: Hurling
- Position: Left wing-back
Club
- Years: Club
- 2026-: Monaleen
Club titles
- Limerick titles: 0
College
- Years: College
- 2025-present: University of Limerick
College titles
- Fitzgibbon titles: 0
Inter-county*
Years	County	Apps (scores)
2026-	Limerick	0 (0-00)
Inter-county titles
- Munster titles: 1
- All-Irelands: 1
- NHL: 1
- All Stars: 0
- *Inter County team apps and scores correct as of 23:48, 20 July 2026.

Matthew Fitzgerald (born 2006) is an Irish hurler. At club level, he plays with Monaleen and at inter-county level with the Limerick senior hurling team.

== Career ==
Fitzgerald played hurling at all grades during his time as a student at Castletroy College in Limerick, including in the Dr Harty Cup. He later attended the University of Limerick and won a Freshers' Hurling League title in 2025. At club level, Fitzgerald scored the winning point when Monaleen won the Limerick Premier U20HC medal in 2024.

At inter-county level, Fitzgerald first appeared for Limerick as part of the minor team in 2023 and ended the year by being named on the GAA Minor Star Hurling Team of the Year. He immediately progressed to the under-20 team. Fitzgerald was added to the senior team for the 2026 season.

== Career statistics ==
As of 19 July 2026

Team	Year	National League			Munster		All-Ireland		Total	
Team	Year	Division	Apps	Score	Apps	Score	Apps	Score	Apps	Score
Limerick	2026	Division 1A	4	0-01	0	0-00	0	0-00	4	0-01
Career total			4	0-01	0	0-00	0	0-00	4	0-01

== Honours ==
University of Limerick

- Freshers' Hurling League (1): 2025

Monaleen

- Limerick Premier Under-20 Hurling Championship (1): 2024

Limerick

- All-Ireland Senior Hurling Championship (1): 2026
- Munster Senior Hurling Championship (1): 2026
- National Hurling League (1): 2026
- Munster Senior Hurling League (1): 2026
