= Kildimo-Pallaskenry GAA =

Gaelic games club in County Limerick, Ireland

- CLG Pailís Chaonraí
- Founded: 1906
- County: Limerick
- Colours: Blue and White
- Coordinates: 52°38′29.90″N 8°51′52.72″W

Playing kits
Standard colours

Kildimo-Pallaskenry GAA is a Gaelic Athletic Association club located in the villages of Kildimo & Pallaskenry, County Limerick, Ireland. It was founded in 1906 and the following are some significant dates from its history:

== History and achievements ==
- 1906 Pallaskenry affiliated to County Board.
- 1912 County Junior hurling final against Claughaun, played in 1914 in Markets Field, Pallaskenry lost 3-2 to 2-3
- 1916 Joined with Kildimo.
- 1920 Parted from Kildimo.
- 1936 West Junior A hurling final against Knockaderry. Pallaskenry lost 7-5 to 1-3.
- 1950 Joined Kildimo.
- 1951 Pallaskenry field opened and blessed.
- 1953 Kildimo/Pallaskenry enter City Division.
- 1953 Kildimo/Pallaskenry lost City Junior hurling final to the Mental Hospital (the Mental Hospital's staff by the way)
- 1955 Kildimo/Pallaskenry won City Junior football final, beat Claughaun 0-3 to 0-2.
- 1956 Kildimo/Pallaskenry won City Junior hurling final, beat St Patricks 2-7 to 2-4.
- 1958 Kildimo/Pallaskenry won City Junior hurling final, beat Ballybrown in replay.
- 1959 After Incident in match against Ballybrown, Kildimo/Pallaskenry suspended for five years.
- 1965 Kildimo/Pallaskenry back in action, but to no avail.
- 1971 Parted from Kildimo- Pallaskenry back on own in West, Kildimo in City Division.
- 1980 Pallaskenry field officially purchased.
- 1986 Pallaskenry Bord na nÓg formed.
- 1987 First underage title, City U13 football win over Ballybrown.
- 1989 First underage hurling title, City U12 hurling win over Corpus Christi.
- 1992 First County final at any age in 80 years, lost U14 football to Bruree.
- 1992 Lost U16 County hurling final to Ballybricken.
- 1994 First County championship win ever, Minor football win over Banogue.
- 1995 City Junior B football final, lost to Kildimo after replay.
- 1996 Won City U21 B football championship beat St. Patricks Ð lost county semi final to Knockainey.
- 1997 First competitive adult trophy, won City Junior B Hurling League against Monaleen.
- 1997 Won City hurling League Cup Final against Na Piarsaigh.
- 1997 Lost County Junior B Hurling semi final to Cappamore.
- 1998 Second ever County title, U16 football win over Banogue.
- 2001 First championship title Ð City Junior B Football win over St. Patricks.
- 2001 Lost County Junior B football quarter final to Castlemahon.
- 2002 Lost City Junior B Hurling Championship Final to Monaleen.
- 2002 Lost County Junior B Hurling Championship quarter final to Camogue Rovers.
- 2006 Won City Junior B Hurling Championship against Mungret.
- 2006 Merged with Kildimo, won Minor County Football Championship, Division 1.
- 2008 U21 Hurlers beaten by Blackrock in County Final
- 2006 Won City Junior B Hurling C'Ship defeating Mungret by 2-7 to 0-9.
- 2007 Won City Junior B Hurling C'Ship once more defeating Mungret by 1-8 to 0-10.
- 2008 Won City Junior B Hurling C'Ship defeating Claughaun by 0-9 to 1-5.
- 2015 After a very successful playing merger with Kildimo, consisting of 10 years at underage level and 4 years at adult level, playing as Kildimo-Pallaskenry, overwhelming majorities at EGMs in both clubs vote in favour of formally disbanding the clubs and to form a brand new club named Kildimo-Pallaskenry.
- 2017 Kildimo-Pallaskenry win the Limerick Intermediate Hurling Championship beating Glenroe in the final in Fitzgerald Park, Kilmallock
- 2018 The club makes its debut season in the Limerick Premier Intermediate Hurling Championship, ending the season as beaten semi finalists and finishing 2nd in the 8 team group stage.
- 2019 Kildimo-Pallaskenry qualify for the Premier Intermediate Hurling Championship Final at the second attempt, topping the group and subsequently beating Bruff in the semi-final (after extra time). However, they lost to Blackrock in the final.
- 2020 In a Covid-19 disrupted Premier Intermediate Championship, Kildimo-Pallaskenry secure promotion to the Senior Hurling Championship after defeating Mungret St Paul's in the final.
- 2021 & 2022 Kildimo Pallaskenry played in a shortened 2021 Championship, again due to COVID-19, failing narrowly to get to the semi finals. However, they win the County Cup defeating Garryspillane in the final. Normality returned in 2022, a regular 6 team group format back in action and after an opening defeat to 2021 Premier Intermediate champions Mungret St Paul's, Kildimo-Pallaskenry end up winning Group 2 and promotion to Group 1 for 2023. They subsequently lose to Doon in the Quarter Finals.
- 2023 Kildimo-Pallaskenry are playing in the top division of Limerick alongside Patrickswell, Na Piarsaigh, Kilmallock, Ahane and Doon.
