= Fedamore GAA =

Gaelic games club in County Limerick, Ireland

- CLG Feadamair
- Founded: 1884
- County: Limerick
- Colours: Green and white
- Grounds: Boolavoord, Fedamore

Playing kits
Standard colours

Senior Club Championships
	All Ireland	Munster champions	Limerick champions
Hurling:	0	0	2

Fedamore GAA club is a Gaelic Athletic Association club in Fedamore, County Limerick, Ireland. The club fields teams in both hurling and Gaelic football. The club has won the Limerick Senior Hurling Championship on two occasions in 1912 and 1927.

== Location ==
The club is located in the parish of Fedamore which is 15km south of Limerick City. It is a member of the East division and neighbouring clubs include Ballybricken/Bohermore, Camogue Rovers, Crecora/Manister and South Liberties with whom Fedamore once had a close rivalry.

== History ==
The club was founded in 1884 making it one of the oldest GAA clubs in the county. The club won the Limerick Senior Hurling Championship in 1912 beating Ballingarry and in 1927 beating Young Ireland's. Several East Senior Championships were also won in the early 20th century. Liam Clifford, a member of the club, was elected ninth president of the GAA, serving from 1926-1928. Paddy Clohessy won All-Ireland Senior Hurling Championships in 1934, 1936 and 1940 while his brother Dave joined him in 1934 and 1936. The club had to wait until 1976 for their next significant achievement when they won the County Intermediate Hurling Championship with a win over Glenroe. Soon after their minors amalgamated with South Liberties and reached the county final

The club did win the County Under-16 11-a-side championship in 2010 but declining numbers meant that they are amalgamated with Crecora/Manister from under-13 to minor (Kilpeacon) and with South Liberties at under-21 level (St. Kevin's). Kilpeacon won the County Minor B Football Championship in 2013. Fedamore's junior B footballers won the County Junior B Football League also in 2013 but were beaten narrowly in the Championship final by Feenagh/Kilmeedy. In 2015 Fedamore won the Junior B football county championship (first adult county title in 39 years) beating rivals Crecora in the final.

== Grounds ==
The club's field was previously located in Fanningstown, 2km from the village. However, a site was bought at Boolavoord just outside the village on the Croom road. The facilities include a full sized pitch, clubhouse and car park.

== Honours ==
- Limerick Senior Hurling Championship (2): 1912, 1927
- Limerick Intermediate Hurling Championship (1): 1976
- Limerick Junior 'B' Football Championship (1): 2015

== Notable players ==
- Willie Gleeson
- Paddy Clohessy
- Dave Clohessy
- Tom Shinney
