= Doon GAA =

Gaelic games club in County Limerick, Ireland

Doon
- Dún Bleisce
- Founded: 1888
- County: Limerick
- Nickname: Doon
- Colours: Red and white, away colours are purple and green
- Grounds: Doon GAA field
- Coordinates: 52°36′03.02″N 8°14′43.20″W

Playing kits
Standard colours

Doon GAA club is a Gaelic Athletic Association club, founded in 1888. It is based in the village of Doon in County Limerick, Ireland. The club is part of the East Division of the Limerick GAA and has a tremendous record at underage level and in 2024 has won its first County Senior Hurling Championship. The club only plays hurling, but footballers in the parish play with neighbouring Oola

== Location ==
The club is located in the parish of Doon, mostly in County Limerick but also containing a few townlands in County Tipperary; these can play with the other club in the parish, Glengar, which is affiliated to the Tipperary GAA County Board. As Oola is only a football club, hurlers from the parish play with Doon. The club is roughly 30 km east of Limerick City. Bordering clubs include Cappamore, Pallasgreen and Doon's sister club Oola in Limerick, and Seán Treacy's, Cappawhite and Solohead in Tipperary.

== History ==
The club was founded in 1888; it is one of the oldest clubs in the county. The club took part in competitions in both east Limerick and west Tipperary during the late 19th century.

The club's senior hurling team defeated Ahane on Sunday 18 November 2007 in Caherconlish, to become East Limerick Senior Hurling Champions, 2007. They again received the Sean Cunningham Cup. Doon have twice reached the final of the Limerick Senior Hurling Championship, losing to Ballybrown in 1989 and Patrickswell (by only one point) in 2000. In 1973 a Doon player, Willy Moore, was present in the Limerick team which beat Kilkenny to win the all-Ireland hurling final.

Doon GAA's under-21 team reached the final of the Limerick Under-21 Hurling Championship in 2004 and lost, but returned to the final in 2005 and beat Adare to take the championship for the first time. Doon's success at an underage level is outstanding, winning every county "A" title at each grade.

On 27 October 2024, Doon made history by beating Na Piarsiagh by 0-16 to 2-09 to secure their first ever Limerick Senior Hurling Title.

== Grounds ==
The GAA pitch is located just off the main street on the Toher road. The grounds were opened in 1994 and dressing rooms were completed in 2002. The facilities include a full-sized pitch with nets behind each goal, an underage sized pitch with nets behind each goal, a covered stand, four dressing rooms and a hurling wall.

== Honours ==
- Limerick Senior Hurling Championship Winners (1): 2024
- Limerick Senior Hurling League (4): 1993, 2003, 2005, 2008
- Limerick Senior Hurling Cup (2): 1993, 2010
- Limerick Junior A Hurling Championship (2): 1937, 1941
- Limerick Junior A Hurling League (3): 2003, 2009, 2014
- Limerick Junior A Football Championship (1): 1928
- Limerick Junior B Hurling Championship (2): 1994, 2014
- Limerick Junior B Hurling League (4): 1994, 1995, 2009, 2014
- Limerick Under-21 Hurling Championship (7): 1966, 1967, 1982, 2005, 2019, 2020, 2021
- Limerick Minor Hurling Championship (12): 1946, 1959, 1965, 1967, 1970, 1976, 1979, 1995, 2003, 2012, 2013, 2015

== Notable players ==
- Adam English
- Richie English - Limerick U-21 2015 and current senior player
- Willie Moore
- Barry Murphy - Limerick U-21 2017
- Mikey O'Brien
- Darragh O'Donovan - Limerick U-21 2015
- Pat Ryan - Limerick U-21 2015
