= Seán Finn =

Irish hurler (born 1996)

Personal information
- Native name: Seán Ó Finn (Irish)
- Born: 24 January 1996 (age 30) Bruff, County Limerick, Ireland
- Occupation: Process compliance lead
- Height: 5 ft 10 in (178 cm)

Sport
- Sport: Hurling
- Position: Right corner-back
Club
- Years: Club
- 2013–present: Bruff
Club titles
- Limerick titles: 0
College
- Years: College
- 2014–2018: University of Limerick
College titles
- Fitzgibbon titles: 1
Inter-county*
Years	County	Apps (scores)
2016–present	Limerick	49 (0–00)
Inter-county titles
- Munster titles: 7
- All-Irelands: 6
- NHL: 4
- All Stars: 4
- *Inter County team apps and scores correct as of 21:20, 19 July 2026.

Seán Finn (born 24 January 1996) is an Irish hurler. At club level he plays with Bruff and at inter-county level with the Limerick senior hurling team.

== Early life ==
Born and raised in Bruff, County Limerick, Finn was educated at Coláiste Iósaef in Kilmallock and played in all grades of hurling during his time there. During his studies at the University of Limerick (UL), he continued his hurling development. Finn won a Fitzgibbon Cup medal in February 2028, following UL's 2–21 to 2–15 defeat of Dublin City University in the final. He was later named on the Fitzgibbon Cup Team of the Year.

== Club career ==
Finn began his club career at juvenile and underage levels with the Bruff club, before progressing to adult level. He was just out of the minor grade when he won a Limerick PIHC medal in October 2014, after scoring 1–02 in the 2–14 to 0–16 win over Croom in the final. Finn was also man of the match in the final and was named on the Limerick Leader's Team of the Year.

== Inter-county career ==
Finn first appeared on the inter-county scene for Limerick during a two-year tenure with the minor team. He won a Munster MHC title in July 2013, Limerick's first in 29 years, following a 1–20 to 4–08 win over Waterford in the final. Finn was eligible for the minor grade again the following year and won a second consecutive Munster MHC medal after a second consecutive 0–24 to 0–18 defeat of Waterford in a replay. He subsequently lined out at right corner-back in Limerick's 2–17 to 0–19 defeat by Kilkenny in the 2014 All-Ireland MHC final.

Finn immediately progressed to Limerick's under-21 team and won a Munster U21HC medal in June 2015 after a 0–22 to 0–19 win over Clare in the final. He was later at corner-back when Limerick beat Wexford by 0–26 to 1–07 in the 2015 All-Ireland U21HC final. After returning to the panel following a prolnged injury, Finn won a second Munster U21HC medal in 2017 following a 0–16 to 1–11 win over Cork in the final. He added a second All-Ireland U21HC medal to his collection after lining out at right corner-back in Limerick's 0–17 to 0–11 defeat of Kilkenny in the 2017 All-Ireland U21HC final. Finn ended the season by being named on the Team of the Year.

Finn was just 19-years-old when he was drafted onto the senior team by manager T. J Ryan in 2016. He played a number of pre-season games in the Munster League, however, it was revealed in February 2016 that Finn would miss the rest of the season after tearing his cruciate ligament. Finn recovered and returned to the team under new manager John Kiely. He made his debut in a 1–25 to 3–15 National Hurling League defeat of Offaly in March 2017.

Finn was selected at right corner-back when Limerick played Galway in the 2018 All-Ireland SHC final and ended the game with his first All-Ireland SHC medal following the 3–16 to 2–18 win, with Limerick claiming their first title in 45 years. He ended the season by being named as the All-Star right corner-back position on the . Finn added a National League medal to his collection in March 2019, when Limerick beat Waterford by 1–24 to 0–19 to win the title. He won his first Munster SHC medal in June 2019, following a 2–26 to 2–14 defeat of Tipperary in the final. Finn the season by claiming a second consecutive All-Star.

After retaining the National League title in a COVID-delayed final in October 2020, Finn later won a second consecutive Munster SHC after a four-point win over Waterford in the final. He claimed his second All-Ireland SHC medal in December 2020, as Waterford were once again beaten by 0–30 to 0–19. Finn was later named as the All-Star right corner-back for the third consecutive year.

Finn won his third Munster SHC medal in July 2021, as Limerick claimed a third consecutive title for the first time in 85 years following a 3–21 to 2–29 win over Tipperary in the final. He later added a third All-Ireland SHC medal to his collection, again from right corner-back, in the 3–32 to 1–22 defeat of Cork. Finn ended the season by being presented with a fourth consecutive All-Star, as well as being a GAA/GPA Hurler of the Year nominee.

Limerick retained the Munster SHC title for a fourth consecutive year in June 2022, with Finn collecting his fourth winners' medal following the 1–29 to 0–29 extra-time win over Clare. He later won his third consecutive All-Ireland SHC medal, once again in his usual right corner-back position, in the 1–31 to 2–26 win over Kilkenny in the 2022 All-Ireland SHC final. He ended the season with his fourth consecutive All-Star.

Finn won his third National League medal in April 2023, after a 2–20 to 0–15 win over Kilkenny in the final. He damaged his anterior cruciate ligament in Limerick's Munster SHC defeat of Clare in April 2023 and, for the second time in his career, was ruled out for the rest of the season. Limerick retained their Munster SHC title, before winning a record-equalling fourth consecutive All-Ireland SHC title, with Finn collecting winners' medals as a member of the extended panel.

Finn returned to the team in March 2024. He was a non-playing substitute when Limerick won a record-breaking sixth consecutive Munster SHC title after a 1–26 to 1–20 win over Clare in the 2024 Munster SHC final. After a trophy-less 2025 season, Limerick regained the National League title with a six-point win over Cork in April 2026, with Finn claiming his fourth winners' medal in that competition. He later collected a seventh Munster SHC medal, as Limerick also regained that title with a 1–21 to 2–17 win over Cork in the final. Finn won a sixth All-Ireland SHC medal in July 2022, after a 1–29 to 1–18 win over Galway in the 2026 All-Ireland SHC final.

== Personal life ==
His father, Brian Finn, also played with Limerick and was an All-Ireland SHC runner-up in 1994. Finn is a cousin of YouTuber Daithi De Nogla.

== Career statistics ==
As of match played 19 July 2026.

Team	Year	National League			Munster		All-Ireland		Total	
Team	Year	Division	Apps	Score	Apps	Score	Apps	Score	Apps	Score
Limerick	2016	Division 1B	0	0-00	0	0-00	0	0-00	0	0-00
Limerick	2017	Division 1B	3	0-00	1	0-00	1	0-00	5	0-00
Limerick	2018	Division 1B	5	0-00	4	0-00	4	0-00	13	0-00
Limerick	2019	Division 1A	7	0-00	5	0-00	1	0-00	13	0-00
Limerick	2020	Division 1A	5	0-00	3	0-00	2	0-00	10	0-00
Limerick	2021	Division 1A	3	0-00	2	0-00	2	0-00	7	0-00
Limerick	2022	Division 1A	3	0-00	5	0-00	2	0-00	10	0-00
Limerick	2023	Division 1A	5	0-00	2	0-00	0	0-00	7	0-00
Limerick	2024	Division 1A	1	0-00	3	0-00	1	0-00	5	0-00
Limerick	2025	Division 1A	4	0-00	3	0-00	1	0-00	9	0-00
Limerick	2026	Division 1A	4	0-00	5	0-00	2	0-00	11	0-00
Career total			40	0-00	33	0-00	16	0-00	89	0-00

== Honours ==
University of Limerick

- Fitzgibbon Cup (1): 2018

Bruff

- Limerick Premier Intermediate Hurling Championship (1): 2014

Limerick

- All-Ireland Senior Hurling Championship (6): 2018, 2020, 2021, 2022, 2023, 2026
- Munster Senior Hurling Championship (7): 2019, 2020, 2021, 2022, 2023, 2024, 2026
- National Hurling League (4): 2019, 2020, 2023, 2026
- All-Ireland Under-21 Hurling Championship (2): 2015, 2017
- Munster Under-21 Hurling Championship (2): 2015, 2017
- Munster Minor Hurling Championship (2): 2013, 2014

Awards

- All-Star Award (4): 2018, 2019, 2020, 2021
- The Sunday Game Team of the Year (5): 2018, 2019, 2020, 2021, 2022
