= Barry O'Connell (hurler) =

Irish hurler (born 1994)

Personal information
- Native name: Barra Ó Conaill (Irish)
- Born: 1994 (age 31–32) Kildimo, County Limerick, Ireland
- Height: 6 ft 4 in (193 cm)

Sport
- Sport: Hurling
- Position: Right wing-forward
Club
- Years: Club
- Kildimo-Pallaskenry
Club titles
- Limerick titles: 3
College
- Years: College
- Limerick Institute of Technology
College titles
- Fitzgibbon titles: 0
Inter-county*
Years	County	Apps (scores)
2016-2019	Limerick	0 (0-00)
Inter-county titles
- Munster titles: 0
- All-Irelands: 1
- NHL: 1
- All Stars: 0
- *Inter County team apps and scores correct as of 17:20, 3 May 2019.

Barry O'Connell (born 1994) is an Irish hurler who plays for Limerick Premier Championship club Kildimo-Pallaskenry. He usually lines out as a right wing-forward. O'Connell is a former member of the Limerick senior hurling team.

== Playing career ==
=== University ===
During his studies at the Limerick Institute of Technology, O'Connell was selected for the college's senior hurling team for the Fitzgibbon Cup.

=== Club ===
O'Connell joined the Kildimo-Pallaskenry club at a young age and played in all grades at juvenile and underage levels, before eventually joining the club's top adult team.

On 28 October 2017, O'Connell captained Kildimo-Pallaskenry to the Limerick Intermediate Championship title. He scored a point from right wing-forward in the 2–13 to 0–09 defeat of Glenroe in the final.

=== Inter-county ===
==== Minor and under-21 ====
O'Connell first played for Limerick as a member of the minor team on 27 April 2011 in a 2–14 to 0-12 Munster Championship defeat of Cork. His two seasons with the minor team ended without success.

O'Connell subsequently joined the Limerick under-21 hurling team and won a Munster Championship medal in his first season after a 0–22 to 0–19 win over Clare in the final. On 12 September 2015, he was at centre-back when Limerick defeated Wexford by 0–26 to 1–07 in the All-Ireland final.

==== Intermediate ====
O'Connell played for the Limerick intermediate hurling team for the first time on 9 June 2013 in a 0–20 to 0-15 Munster Championship defeat by Tipperary. He also lined out during Limerick's unsuccessful championship campaign in 2015.

==== Senior ====
O'Connell joined the Limerick senior panel in January 2016. He made his first appearance for the team in a 1–19 to 0-14 National Hurling League defeat of Offaly on 6 March 2016.

O'Connell was included on the panel again in 2017, however, he was not included on Limerick's championship panel.

O'Connell rejoined the Limerick senior panel in 2018. On 19 August 2018, he was a member of the extended panel when Limerick won their first All-Ireland title in 45 years after a 3–16 to 2–18 defeat of Galway in the final.

O'Connell was a member of Limerick's extended panel once again during the 2019 National League, however, he made no appearance during Limerick's eight-game run to the title. He was dropped from the panel prior to the start of the Munster Championship.

== Career statistics ==
As of match played 31 March 2019.

Team	Year	National League			Munster		All-Ireland		Total	
Team	Year	Division	Apps	Score	Apps	Score	Apps	Score	Apps	Score
Limerick	2016	Division 1B	2	0-00	0	0-00	0	0-00	2	0-00
Limerick	2017	Division 1B	0	0-00	—		—		0	0-00
Limerick	2018	Division 1B	5	0-04	0	0-00	0	0-00	5	0-04
Limerick	2019	Division 1A	0	0-00	—		—		0	0-00
Total			7	0-04	0	0-00	0	0-00	7	0-04

== Honours ==
Kildimo-Pallaskenry

- Limerick Intermediate Hurling Championship (1): 2017 (c)

Limerick

- All-Ireland Senior Hurling Championship (1): 2018
- National Hurling League (1): 2019
- All-Ireland Under-21 Hurling Championship (1): 2015
- Munster Under-21 Hurling Championship (1): 2015
