= Dave McCarthy (hurler) =

Irish hurler

Personal information
- Native name: Daithí Mac Cárthaigh (Irish)
- Born: 1994 (age 31–32) Glenroe, County Limerick, Ireland

Sport
- Sport: Hurling
- Position: Goalkeeper
Club
- Years: Club
- Glenroe
Club titles
- Limerick titles: 0
College
- Years: College
- University of Limerick
College titles
- Fitzgibbon titles: 2
Inter-county
Years	County	Apps (scores)
2016-2017; 2022-	Limerick	0 (0-00)
Inter-county titles
- Munster titles: 2
- All-Irelands: 2
- NHL: 1
- All Stars: 0

David McCarthy (born 1994) is an Irish hurler who plays as a goalkeeper for club side Glenroe and at inter-county level with the Limerick senior hurling team.

== Career ==
McCarthy first came to prominence at juvenile and underage levels with the Glenroe club before joining the club's adult team. He lined out in goal when the club beat Newcastle West to win the Limerick IHC title in 2019. McCarthy first appeared on the inter-county scene with the Limerick under-21 hurling team that won the All-Ireland Under-21 Championship title in 2015. He ended the season by being named on the Team of the Year.

McCarthy's performances in this grade saw him drafted onto the Limerick senior hurling team in 2016, however, he was released from the panel after the conclusion of the 2017 National League. McCarthy won a Fitzgibbon Cup title with the University of Limerick in 2018, before being recalled to the Limerick senior team in 2022.

== Honours ==
University of Limerick

- Fitzgibbon Cup: 2015, 2018

Glenroe

- Limerick Intermediate Hurling Championship: 2019

Limerick

- All-Ireland Senior Hurling Championship: 2022, 2023
- Munster Senior Hurling Championship: 2022, 2023
- National Hurling League: 2023
- Munster Hurling Cup: 2022
- All-Ireland Under-21 Hurling Championship: 2015
- Munster Under-21 Hurling Championship : 2015
