= Pat Ryan (Limerick hurler) =

Irish hurler (born 1995)

Pat Simon Ryan
Personal information
- Native name: Pádraig Ó Riain (Irish)
- Born: 1995 (age 30–31) Doon, County Limerick, Ireland
- Height: 6 ft 0 in (183 cm)

Sport
- Sport: Hurling
- Position: Full-forward
Club
- Years: Club
- Doon
Club titles
- Limerick titles: 1
College
- Years: College
- University of Limerick
College titles
- Fitzgibbon titles: 1
Inter-county*
Years	County	Apps (scores)
2017-present	Limerick	18 (1-07)
Inter-county titles
- Munster titles: 3
- All-Irelands: 3
- NHL: 2
- All Stars: 0
- *Inter County team apps and scores correct as of 22:15, 23 April 2022.

Patrick Ryan (born 1995) is an Irish hurler who plays as a Full Forward for club side Doon and at inter-county level with the Limerick senior hurling team.

== Playing career ==
=== University ===
During his studies at the University of Limerick, Ryan was selected for the college's senior hurling team. On 24 February 2018, he won a Fitzgibbon Cup medal following UL's 2–21 to 2–15 defeat of Dublin City University in the final.

=== Club ===
Ryan joined the Doon club at a young age and played in all grades at juvenile and underage levels, enjoying championship success in under-12, under-14 and under-15 grades. As a member of the club's minor team, he won back-to-back championship medals in 2012 and 2013 following respective defeats of Patrickswell and Na Piarsaigh. Ryan later made his senior championship debut for the club.

=== Inter-county ===
==== Minor and under-21 ====
Ryan first played for Limerick at minor level in 2012, in a season which ended with a defeat by Clare in the Munster Championship semi-final.

Ryan joined the Limerick under-21 hurling team in 2014. In his second season he won a Munster Championship medal after a 0–22 to 0–19 win over Clare in the final. On 12 September 2015, Ryan was at midfield when Limerick defeated Wexford by 0–26 to 1–07 in the All-Ireland final. He ended the season by being named on the Bord Gáis Energy Team of the Year.

==== Senior ====
On 12 February 2017, Ryan made his first appearance for the Limerick senior team in a 1–14 to 0-14 National Hurling League defeat by Wexford.

On 19 August 2018, Ryan was a non-playing substitute when Limerick won their first All-Ireland title in 45 years after a 3–16 to 2–18 defeat of Galway in the final.

On 30 June 2019, Ryan won a Munster Championship medal as a non-playing substitute following Limerick's 2–26 to 2–14 defeat of Tipperary in the final.

== Career statistics ==
As of match played 23 April 2022.

Team	Year	National League			Munster		All-Ireland		Total	
Team	Year	Division	Apps	Score	Apps	Score	Apps	Score	Apps	Score
Limerick	2017	Division 1B	6	0-03	1	0-01	1	0-01	8	0-05
Limerick	2018	Division 1B	4	1-03	2	0-00	1	1-00	7	2-03
Limerick	2019	Division 1A	6	0-08	3	0-00	1	0-00	10	0-08
Limerick	2020	Division 1A	1	0-01	2	0-02	2	0-00	5	0-03
Limerick	2021	Division 1A	3	1-02	2	0-00	1	0-01	6	1-03
	2022	Division 1A	3	1-02	2	0-02	0	0-00	5	1-04
Total			23	3-19	12	0-05	6	1-02	41	4-26

== Honours ==
Mary Immaculate College

- Fitzgibbon Cup (1): 2018

Doon

- Limerick Minor Hurling Championship (2): 2012, 2013

Limerick

- All-Ireland Senior Hurling Championship (2): 2018, 2020, 2021, 2022
- Munster Senior Hurling Championship (3): 2019, 2020, 2021, 2022
- National Hurling League (2): 2019, 2020
- All-Ireland Under-21 Hurling Championship (1): 2015
- Munster Under-21 Hurling Championship (1): 2015
- Munster Minor Hurling Championship (1): 2013
