= Brian Finn =

Irish hurler (born 1965)

Personal information
- Born: 1965 (age 60–61) Bruff, County Limerick, Ireland
- Occupation: Secondary school teacher

Sport
- Sport: Hurling
- Position: Right corner-back
Clubs
- Years: Club
- Bruff; South Liberties
Club titles
- Limerick titles: 0
College
- Years: College
- Thomond College
College titles
- Fitzgibbon titles: 0
Inter-county
Years	County	Apps (scores)
1985-1994	Limerick	13 (0-03)
Inter-county titles
- Munster titles: 1
- All-Irelands: 0
- NHL: 2
- All Stars: 0

Brian Finn (born 1965) is an Irish former hurler. At club level he played with Bruff and also lined out at inter-county level with various Limerick teams.

== Career ==
Born in Bruff, County Limerick, Finn first played hurling and Gaelic football at juvenile and underage levels with the Bruff club. He was part of the team that won the Limerick MHC title in 1983. Finn later transferred to the South Liberties club in Limerick, before ending his career back with Bruff.

Finn first appeared on the inter-county scene with the Limerick minor team that lost consecutive Munster finals in 1982 and 1983. He progressed to the under-21 team and won a Munster U21HC medal in his final year with the team in 1986. By that stage, Finn had already joined the senior team and won a National League medal in his debut season in 1985. He claimed a second league medal in 1992. Finn was a non-playing substitute when Limerick suffered a defeat by Offaly in the 1994 All-Ireland final. His performances at inter-county level resulted in his selection for the Munster Railway Cup team.

== Personal life ==
Finn studied at Thomond College before later working as the Gaelic games development officer at NIHE Limerick. During his time here he coached the hurling team to their inaugural Fitzgibbon Cup. Finn's son, Seán Finn, has also played for Limerick.

== Honours ==
=== Player ===
Bruff

- Limerick Minor Hurling Championship: 1983

Limerick

- Munster Senior Hurling Championship: 1984
- National Hurling League: 1984–85, 1991–92
- Munster Under-21 Hurling Championship: 1986

=== Management ===
NIHE Limerick

- Fitzgibbon Cup: 1989
