= 2018 Fitzgibbon Cup =

Irish collegiate hurling tournament

Tournament details
- Year: 2018
- Trophy: Fitzgibbon Cup
- Sponsor: Electric Ireland

Winners
- Champions: University of Limerick
- Captain: John McGrath

Runners-up
- Runners-up: DCU

The 2018 Electric Ireland Fitzgibbon Cup was the 102nd staging of the Fitzgibbon Cup since its establishment in 1912. In the final on 24 February, the University of Limerick defeated DCU by 2-21 to 2-15.

== 2017-18 Group A Qualifying ==
Round	Team 1	Score	Team 2	Score	Where Played	Date
Rd1	Cork Institute of Technology	0-12	University College Cork	1-19	Cork IT	18 January 2018
Rd2	University College Cork	0-13	University College Dublin	11-15	Mardyke, Cork	24 January 2018
Rd3	University College Dublin	1-17	Cork Institute of Technology	1-12	Belfield, Dublin	30 January 2018

Qualifiers: University College Dublin; University College Cork

== 2017-18 Group B Qualifying ==
Round	Team 1	Score	Team 2	Score	Where Played	Date
Rd1	University of Limerick	3-29	Dublin Institute of Technology	4-17	UL Grounds, Limerick	21 January 2018
Rd2	Dublin Institute of Technology	3-19	Waterfor d Institute of Technology	1-19	Grangegorman, Dublin	25 January 2018
Rd3	Waterford Institute of Technology	1-8	University of Limerick	2-19	WIT Sports Campus	1 February 2018

Qualifiers: University of Limerick; Dublin Institute of Technology

== 2017-18 Group C Qualifying ==
Round	Team 1	Score	Team 2	Score	Where Played	Date
Rd1	Limerick Institute of Technology	2-17	DCU Dóchas Éireann	3-15	Limerick IT	22 January 2018
Rd2	DCU Dóchas Éireann	2-22	Garda College	0-8	DCU Sports Grounds, Dublin	25 January 2018
Rd3	Garda College	1-7	Limerick Institute of Technology	3-18	Templetuohy	1 February 2018

Qualifiers: DCU Dóchas Éireann; Limerick Institute of Technology

== 2017-18 Group D Qualifying ==
Round	Team 1	Score	Team 2	Score	Where Played	Date
Rd1	IT Carlow	1-22	Mary Immaculate College Limerick	0-22	Heywood, Ballinakill	21 January 2018
Rd1	Trinity College Dublin	0-13	NUI Galway	2-22	Abbotstown - GAA Centre of Excellence	21 January 2018
Rd2	N.U.I. Galway	1-16	IT Carlow	2-16	Dangan, Galway	25 January 2018
Rd2	Mary Immaculate College Limerick	3-20	Trinity College Dublin	3-12	UL Grounds, Limerick	25 January 2018
Rd3	Mary Immaculate College Limerick	1-20	N.U.I. Galway	2-16	MICL Grounds, Limerick	1 February 2018
Rd3	Trinity College Dublin	0-14	IT Carlow	1-19	TCD Grounds, Santry, Dublin	1 February 2018

Qualifiers: IT Carlow; Mary Immaculate College Limerick

== 2017-18 Finals Tournament ==
Quarter-finals; 7/8 February
University of Limerick	4-18
University College Cork	0-8
Institute of Technology Carlow	1-19
Limerick Institute of Technology	0-18
University College Dublin	0-17
Dublin Institute of Technology	0-19
DCU Dóchas Éireann	0-20
Mary Immaculate College Limerick	2-12

Semi-finals; 13 February
University of Limerick	4-16
Institute of Technology Carlow	0-19
Dublin Institute of Technology	1-12
DCU Dóchas Éireann	2-20

Final; 24 February
University of Limerick	2-21
DCU Dóchas Éireann	2-15

== Awards ==
Team of the Year

1. Dave McCarthy
2. Conor Cleary
3. Eoghan O'Donnell
4. Seán Finn
5. Gearóid Hegarty
6. Brian Hogan
7. David Fitzgerald
8. Colin Dunford
9. Joe O'Connor
10. John Donnelly
11. Martin Kavanagh
12. Donal Burke
13. Niall O'Brien
14. Jason Forde
15. John McGrath
