= Richie English =

Irish hurler (born 1995)

Personal information
- Native name: Risteard Inglis (Irish)
- Born: 15 March 1995 (age 31) Doon, County Limerick, Ireland
- Occupation: Primary school teacher
- Height: 6 ft 1 in (185 cm)

Sport
- Sport: Hurling
- Position: Left corner-back
Club
- Years: Club
- Doon
Club titles
- Limerick titles: 1
College
- Years: College
- 2013-2017: Mary Immaculate College
College titles
- Fitzgibbon titles: 1
Inter-county*
Years	County	Apps (scores)
2014-2024	Limerick	27 (0-00)
Inter-county titles
- Munster titles: 6
- All-Irelands: 4
- NHL: 3
- All Stars: 1
- *Inter County team apps and scores correct as of 20:11, 09 June 2024.

Richard English (born 15 March 1995) is an Irish hurler who plays as a left corner-back for club side Doon and previously at inter-county level with the Limerick senior hurling team.

== Early life ==
English was born in Doon, County Limerick. His cousin, Darragh Fitzgibbon, is a member of the Cork senior hurling team.

== Playing career ==
=== University ===
During his studies at Mary Immaculate College, English was selected for the college's senior hurling team and was appointed captain of the team in his second season. On 27 February 2016, he won a Fitzgibbon Cup medal as Mary I won their first ever title after a 1–30 to 3–22 defeat of the University of Limerick. English was once again at full-back when Mary I retained the title in 2017 following a 3–24 to 1–19 defeat of Carlow Institute of Technology.

=== Club ===
English joined the Doon club at a young age and played in all grades at juvenile and underage levels, enjoying championship success in under-12, under-14 and under-15 grades. As a member of the club's minor team, he won back-to-back championship medals in 2012 and 2013 following respective defeats of Patrickswell and Na Piarsaigh. English made his senior championship debut for the club in 2012.

=== Inter-county ===
==== Minor and under-21 ====
English first played for Limerick at minor level in 2012, in season which ended with a defeat by Clare in the Munster Championship semi-final. He was eligible for the minor grade once again the following year and was also appointed captain of the team. On 23 July 2013, English was at right corner-back when Limerick won their first Munster Championship title in 29 years after a 1–20 to 4–08 defeat of Waterford.

English joined the Limerick under-21 hurling team in 2014. In his second season he won a Munster Championship medal after a 0–22 to 0–19 win over Clare in the final. On 12 September 2015, English was at full-back when Limerick defeated Wexford in the All-Ireland final. He ended the season by being named the Bord Gáis Energy Player of the Year.

==== Senior ====
English joined the Limerick senior hurling team in January 2014. He was released from the panel prior to the start of the Munster Championship.

On 13 February 2016, English made his senior debut at left corner-back in a National League defeat of Wexford. Later that season he made his first championship start in a 3–11 to 1-16 Munster Championship semi-final defeat by Tipperary.

On 19 August 2018, English was at left corner-back when Limerick won their first All-Ireland title in 45 years after a 3–16 to 2–18 defeat of Galway in the final. Later that day he was named on The Sunday Game Team of the Year. English ended the season by winning an All-Star Award.

On 31 March 2019, English was selected at left corner-back for Limerick's National League final meeting with Waterford at Croke Park. He collected a winners' medal following the 1–24 to 0–19 victory. Hours after the league title victory, his father Paddy English died after a long illness. On 30 June 2019, English won a Munster Championship medal at left corner-back following Limerick's 2–26 to 2–14 defeat of Tipperary in the final. He ended the year by being nominated for a second All-Star award.

On 23 February 2020, it was confirmed that English had been ruled out for the rest of the season with a cruciate injury.

On 2 January 2025, English announced his retirement from inter-county hurling after nine years with Limerick.

== Career statistics ==
As of match played 11 June 2023.

Team	Year	National League			Munster		All-Ireland		Total	
Team	Year	Division	Apps	Score	Apps	Score	Apps	Score	Apps	Score
Limerick	2014	Division 1B	0	0-00	—		—		0	0-00
Limerick	2015	Division 1B	—		—		—		—	
Limerick	2016	Division 1B	6	0-00	1	0-00	2	0-00	9	0-00
Limerick	2017	Division 1B	5	0-00	1	0-00	0	0-00	6	0-00
Limerick	2018	Division 1B	7	0-00	4	0-00	4	0-00	15	0-00
Limerick	2019	Division 1A	7	0-00	5	0-00	1	0-00	13	0-00
Limerick	2020	Division 1A	2	0-00	0	0-00	0	0-00	2	0-00
Limerick	2021	Division 1A	5	0-01	2	0-00	1	0-00	8	0-01
	2022	Division 1A	5	0-00	3	0-00	0	0-00	8	0-00
	2023		6	0-01	3	0-00	0	0-00	9	0-01
Total			43	0-02	19	0-00	8	0-00	69	0-02

== Honours ==
Mary Immaculate College

- Fitzgibbon Cup: 2016 (c), 2017

Doon

- Limerick Minor Hurling Championship: 2012, 2013

Limerick

- All-Ireland Senior Hurling Championship: 2018, 2020, 2021, 2022
- Munster Senior Hurling Championship: 2019, 2020, 2021, 2022, 2023
- National Hurling League: 2019, 2020, 2023
- All-Ireland Under-21 Hurling Championship: 2015
- Munster Under-21 Hurling Championship: 2015
- Munster Minor Hurling Championship: 2013 (c)

Awards

- All-Star Award (1): 2018
- The Sunday Game Team of the Year (1): 2018
