= Doon, County Limerick =

Village in County Limerick, Ireland

Doon Dún Bleisce
- Village
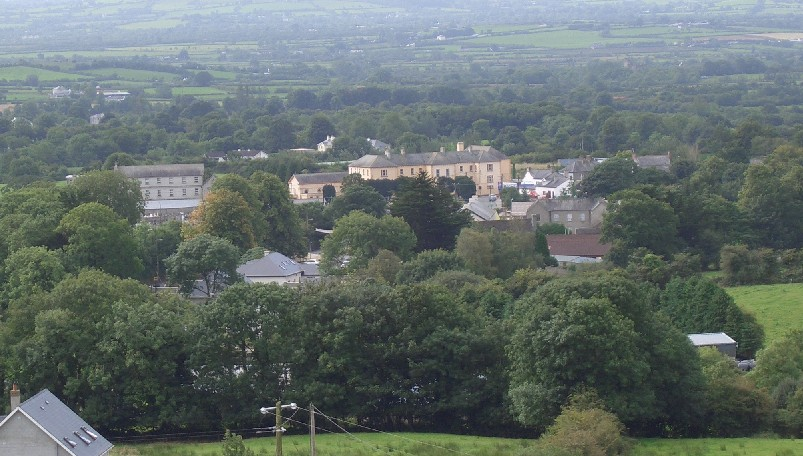
- Aerial view of Doon

- Location in Ireland
- Coordinates: 52.604338°N 8.248479°W
- Country: Ireland
- Province: Munster
- County: County Limerick
- Dáil Éireann: Limerick County
- EU Parliament: South
- Elevation: 150 m (490 ft)

Population (2022)
  - Total: 651
- Website: www.doonbleisce.com

Historical population
Year	Pop.	±%
2006	1,470	—
2011	1,342	−8.7%
2016	516	−61.5%
2022	651	+26.2%

Doon (Irish: Dún Bleisce) is a village in east County Limerick, Ireland, close to the border of County Tipperary. It is also a civil parish in the historic barony of Coonagh. and is an ecclesiastical parish in the Roman Catholic Archdiocese of Cashel and Emly.

== Origin of the name ==
Doon's name in Irish is Dún Bleisce. Dún means fortification and the Ordnance Survey map of the area records eight ring forts. The main ring fort is located behind the Church of Ireland Church outside the village. The Irish name Dún Bleisce has been interpreted as meaning “fort of Bleisce” or “fort of the harlot”. The element blesce is glossed in early Irish sources as meirdreach (“harlot”), although the precise origin of the placename remains uncertain. Historical records indicate that the shortened form Dún had been in common Irish-language use from at least the sixteenth century, while Bleisce fell out of regular usage before being revived in the twentieth century.

The first mention of the name Dún Bleisce was in the Annals of Inisfallen in 774 and for hundreds of years the village was known by this name. In 2003, the Placename Commission recommended that the official translation for Doon be changed to An Dún as it "was the appropriate Irish name for the village". After a sustained campaign by locals which included a motion being adopted by Limerick County Council in November 2006 to request the name be changed back, the locals got their wish. The Minister for Community, Rural and Gaeltacht Affairs, Eamon O'Cuiv, approved the reversion saying that the alternative Dún Bleisce had an "attested historical basis".

== Education ==
Doon has two primary schools and one secondary school.

Doon Convent Primary School was opened in 1868 by the Sisters of Mercy. The foundation of Doon Convent in 1865 was led by Rev. Patrick Hickey P.P., who realised that a sound education was the only hope for the deprived people of the area. His grand-niece was in the Convent of Mercy, Kinsale, County Cork and he invited sisters from Kinsale to come to Doon, which they did in February 1865.

Religious instruction and visitation of the sick were the main works carried out by the first Sisters of Mercy. They had no school so they instructed groups in the garden. In 1867 the Archbishop of Cashel visited the Convent (the Parish Priest's house) and gave the Sister's permission to build a school. The school was opened in 1868. Due to the closure of the National school and overcrowding in the Convent school an additional storey was built in 1878.

The children were taught religion, English reading and writing, instrumental music and singing and crafts such as embroidery and painting. A small boarding school was started for those children who were too far away to attend daily.

Stanley's Education Act 1831 had given state aid for the National Education or Primary education in Ireland. This initially applied only to non-denominational schools but after 1846 a compromise was reached between the Catholic interests and the British government. The result of this was religious orders accepted the state-aid system of Primary education and integrated into it a special time for religious education at the end of the day. This was the system that the Mercy Sisters operated in Doon.

=== Education since 1924 ===
In 1924, the new Dáil Eireann dissolved the Board of Commissioners which had been set up by the Stanley Education Act 1831. All the powers and functions of this commission were transferred to the new Department of Education. Irish became an important subject in the school curriculum so the Sisters began to learn Irish and took a qualifying examination in Irish. They prepared students for the Senior Oxford in 1921, established a Secondary Top in 1924 had a Matriculation class in 1925. In 1928 pupils sat for the Intermediate Certificate.

The Convent of Mercy N.S. is located in the grounds of the Convent of Mercy, Doon, County Limerick. The school is co-educational from Junior Infants to 1st Class. From 2nd Class to 6th Class, the classes are all girls.

- CBS Primary School. In July 1864, Rev. Patrick Hickey PP died, leaving some property in his will to be used to purchase a house and school in Doon for the Christian Brothers. In 1870 Br. Walsh of Sexton St., Limerick selected two acres as a site for the monastery and school. In 1874 the school was opened by Br. Bruno Goode. A new primary school building was opened in September 1967.
- St Joseph's Secondary School for girls – In 1930 the first secondary school was built. The first group of Leaving Cert pupils sat their exam in 1936. The subjects presented were Irish, English, Maths. French, History, Geography and Drawing. Latin was also taught though not for examination as yet. In 1940 the Secondary Top gave way to the new secondary school.

During these years the pupils were prepared for music exams, piano and violin. Plain chant was introduced and the Senior Choir was often awarded the diocesan cup for Plain Chant. Secondary School choirs won the National Trophy, the Pigott Cup, three times in succession in the early 1960s. Light operas were produced annually in those years.

The number of pupils grew over the years. Free education, introduced in 1966 gave a further increase. New school buildings were added to accommodate the increasing numbers. In September 1961 the final permanent school building was opened.

On 24 May 2013 at 7.30 pm mass was celebrated in the local parish church, to mark the closing of the school.

St Joseph's Secondary School, Doon finally closed its doors in June 2013 following the amalgamation of St. Fintans Christian Brothers School (ERST), St Michael's College, Cappamore (County Limerick VEC) and St Joseph's Mercy Secondary School (CEIST).

- St. Fintans CBS for boys – Around 1908 the "classical school" was launched under the direction of Br. Alban O'Donoghue and was given the name "St. Fintan's Collegiate School", Doon, which gradually developed into a secondary school. This was rehoused in its current location around 1984.

St. Fintan's CBS finally closed its doors in June 2013 following the amalgamation of St. Fintans Christian Brothers School (ERST), St Michael's College, Cappamore (County Limerick VEC) and St Joseph's Mercy Secondary School (CEIST).

- Scoil na Tríonóide Naofa is the new secondary school in Doon, County Limerick. It was formed from the amalgamation of St. Fintan's CBS, St. Joseph's Convent of Mercy and St. Michael's College and is a voluntary secondary school under the patronage of CEIST.

The construction company BAM commenced building works on a 15-acre site donated by the Mercy Congregation, at Liscaugh, Doon, County Limerick. The "Turning of the Sod" for the new school called Scoil na Trionóide Naofa, took place on the green field site at Doon, County Limerick on Tuesday 11 December 2012. Scoil na Trionóide Naofa opened to pupils in February 2014.

== Mudslide ==
In July 2014 Doon was hit by a mudslide caused by a torrential downpour. A river of mud flowed down the hill carrying much debris including tree trunks, boulders and railway sleepers. People reported being trapped in cars and sheds unable to return to their homes while the rain was falling. Rivers burst their banks and bridges were destroyed. Many roads around the area were closed and the bridge on the road to Kilcommon is closed indefinitely.

== Sport ==
Doon GAA club was founded in 1888 and has provided several players to the county (Limerick) and provincial (Munster) hurling squads. The current ground was opened in 1994 and the dressing rooms were built in 2002.

The senior team has reached the final of the Limerick Senior Hurling Championship five times, losing to Ballybrown in 1989, Patrickswell in 2000, and Na Piarsigh in both 2018 and 2020. In their fifth final, the team won the Limerick Senior Hurling Championship for the first time, in 2024, beating Na Piarsigh.

In 1973, a Doon player, Willie Moore, played corner-back in the Limerick team which beat Kilkenny to win the all-Ireland hurling final and Jim O'Donnell was on the substitutes bench.

Between 2018 and 2023, five Doon players won All-Ireland medals with Limerick, Darragh O'Donovan – 5, Ritchie English – 4, Pat Ryan – 4, Barry Murphy – 1, and Adam English – 1.

== Places of interest ==
Castle Garde, originally built by the O'Briens, was restored in the early 1800s by Waller O'Grady, to a design of the architects James Pain and George Richard Pain. The design offers many notable features such as the circular keep, square-plan tower, and crenellated parapets. The carved statues, inside the gate house, are particularly fine and unusual features, representing Bacchus, Venus and Athene. The stone head to the main door represents Brian Boru. Coonagh Castle, nearby, dates to the 13th century.

== See also ==
- List of towns and villages in Ireland
