= Edwin Fitzgibbon =

Irish Capuchin friar (1874-1938)

Edwin Fitzgibbon was a Capuchin friar and educator, after whom the intervarsity hurling competition, the Fitzgibbon Cup, is named. He was born Thomas Fitzgibbon on 26 January 1874, in Ballynona North, between Castlemartyr and Dungourney, County Cork, to a largely Irish speaking family. Educated locally at the National School, he went to the Capuchian secondary school in Rochestown, where he joined the Capuchin order, taking the name Edwin. He completed his undergraduate BA degree at Queens College Cork and was ordained in 1902. He completed his doctorate in philosophy at the University of Louvain in Belgium. Returning to Ireland, he served as Rector of Rochestown College from 1906 and following the establishment of the National University of Ireland in 1908 he joined the staff of UCC. From 1911 to 1936, Fitzgibbon was professor of philosophy at University College Cork. In 1912, Fitzgibbon donated most of his annual salary to purchase the trophy. The cup was made at William Egan and Sons' silversmiths, Cork, and bears a large inscription on its front: The Fitzgibbon Cup, Donated by The Rev Fr Edwin O.S.F.C. Feb. 1912.

Fitzgibbon served as Provincial of the Capuchin Order, and also served as president of the UCC Hurling club, until his retirement.

He died on 24 June 1938, and is buried in Rochestown.
