= Ken Coogan =

Irish hurler (born 1983)

Personal information
- Native name: Cionnaith Ó Cuagáin (Irish)
- Born: 1983 (age 42–43) Tullaroan, County Kilkenny, Ireland
- Height: 6 ft 3 in (191 cm)

Sport
- Sport: Hurling
- Position: Midfield
Club
- Years: Club
- Tullaroan
Club titles
- Kilkenny titles: 0
Inter-county
Years	County	Apps (scores)
2003-2004	Kilkenny	1 (0-00)
Inter-county titles
- Leinster titles: 1
- All-Irelands: 1
- NHL: 1
- All Stars: 0

Ken Coogan (born 1983) is an Irish hurler who played as a midfielder for the Kilkenny senior team.

Coogan joined the team during the 2003 championship and made just one appearance during his two seasons of inter-county hurling. During that time he won one All-Ireland winners' medal.

At club level, Coogan plays with the Tullaroan club.
