= 2015 All-Ireland Under-21 Hurling Championship =

All-Ireland Under-21 Hurling Championship 2015
Championship Details
- Dates: 27 May 2015 – 12 September 2015
- Teams: 18

All Ireland Champions
- Winners: Limerick (5th win)
- Captain: Diarmaid Byrnes
- Manager: John Kiely

All Ireland Runners-up
- Runners-up: Wexford
- Captain: Eoin Conroy
- Manager: J. J. Doyle

Provincial Champions
- Munster: Limerick
- Leinster: Wexford
- Ulster: Antrim
- Connacht: Not Played

Championship Statistics
- Matches Played: 17
- Total Goals: 53 (3.1 per game)
- Total Points: 529 (31.1 per game)
- Top Scorer: Conor McDonald (2-34)

The 2015 All-Ireland Under-21 Hurling Championship was the 52nd staging of the All-Ireland championship for since its establishment by the Gaelic Athletic Association in 1964. The draws for the various 2015 fixtures took place in October 2014. The championship began on 27 May 2015 and ended on 12 September 2015.

Clare were the defending champions, however, they were defeated in the provincial decider. Limerick won the title following a 0–26 to 1–7 defeat of Wexford in the final.

== Team summaries ==
Team	Colours	Most recent success	
Team	Colours	All-Ireland	Provincial
Antrim	Saffron and white		2014
Armagh	Orange and white		
Carlow	Green, red and yellow		
Clare	Saffron and blue	2014	2014
Cork	Red and white	1998	2007
Derry	White and red		2008
Down	Red and black		2004
Dublin	Blue and navy		2011
Galway	Maroon and white	2011	2005
Kildare	White		
Kilkenny	Black and amber	2008	2012
Laois	Blue and white		1983
Limerick	Green and white	2002	2011
Offaly	Green, white and gold		2000
Tipperary	Blue and gold	2010	2010
Waterford	White and blue	1992	1994
Westmeath	Maroon and white		
Wexford	Purple and gold	1965	2014

== Results ==
=== Leinster Under-21 Hurling Championship ===
27 May 2015 Quarter-final	Laois	4-7 - 2-15	Carlow	O'Moore Park
19:30	C Dwyer (3-1), PJ Scully (1-3), R Broderick (0-1), C Taylor (0-1), C Collier (0-1).	Report	K McDonnell (0-7), J Doyle (1-2), M Kavanagh (0-5), P Shaw (1-0), G Coady (0-1).	Referee: G Quilty (Kilkenny)

27 May 2015 Quarter-final	Offaly	2-15 - 1-10	Westmeath	O'Connor Park
19:30	A Cleary (1-3), D Murray (0-6, 6f), E Nolan (1-2), C Kiely (0-1), E Cahill (0-1, f), K Dunne (0-1), C Doughan (0-1, f).	Report	D Clinton (1-2, 1f), C Doyle (0-5, 3f), N O’Brien (0-2, 1f), M Daly (0-1).

27 May 2015 Quarter-final	Kildare	0-14 - 0-23	Wexford	St. Conleth's Park
19:30	G Keegan 0-9(8fs); P Moran 0-2; G Johnson, R Casey, L Power 0-1 each	Report	C McDonald 0-12(4fs); K Foley, S Murphy, J O’Connor, P Sutton 0-2 each; S Donohoe, J Cash, C Dunbar 0-1 each.	Referee: A Devine (Westmeath)

2 June 2015 Quarter-final	Dublin	2-16 - 4-12	Kilkenny	Parnell Park
19:30	S Treacy (1-3, 0-1 free), C Boland (1-3), P Winters (0-5, two frees), F McGibb (0-2), O O’Rorke (0-2), AJ Murphy (0-1).	Report	M Mansfield (1-2), C Martin (0-5, four frees), J Maher (1-1), C Bolger (1-0), C Ryan (1-0), L Hickey (0-2, one free), W Brennan (0-1), L Blanchfield (0-1).	Referee: M Murtagh (Westmeath)

24 June 2015 Semi-final	Carlow	2-12 - 2-14	Kilkenny	Netwatch Cullen Park
19:30	P Shaw 1-1, K McDonald 0-4, J Kavanagh 1-0, C Nolan 0-3, M Kavanagh 0-2, T Joyce 0-2.	Report	C Ryan 1-2, C Martin 0-5, L Hickey 1-1, L Blanchfield 0-2, J Cleere 0-1, P Deegan 0-1, M Mansfield 0-1, J Maher 0-1.	Referee: J Heffernan (Wexford)

24 June 2015 Semi-final	Offaly	1-12 - 2-16	Wexford	O'Connor Park
19:30	D Murray 0-5, E Nolan 0-4, M Maloney 1-0, C Doughan 0-1, C Mahon 0-1, S Guinan 0-1.	Report	C McDonald 1-5, K Foley 0-7, C Dunbar 1-1, J O'Connor 0-1, G Bailey 0-1, T French 0-1

8 July 2015 Final	Wexford	4-17 - 1-9	Kilkenny	Innovate Wexford Park
19:30	C McDonald (1-10, 0-6f), C Dunbar (1-1), A Kenny (1-0), J Cash (1-0), K Foley (0-3), Shane Murphy (0-1), S Kenny (0-1), J O'Connor (0-1).	Report	L Hickey (1-0), C Martin (0-3, 2f), L Blanchfield (0-2), W Brennan (0-1), E Cody (0-1), D Cody (0-1), S Morrissey (0-1).	Referee: J Keenan

=== Munster Under-21 Hurling Championship ===
17 June 2015 Quarter-final	Cork	1-11 - 1-21	Waterford	Páirc Uí Rinn
19:35	L Meade (1-1), M Brennan (0-3), M O’Connor (0-3f), D Geary (0-2), K O’Neill (0-1), C Twomey (0-1f).	Report	P Curran (0-12, 7f, 1'65), Shane Bennett (1-4), A Gleeson (0-1), C Dunford (0-1), Stephen Bennett (0-1), DJ Foran (0-1), R Donnelly (0-1).	Referee: F Horgan (Tipperary)

15 July 2015 Semi-final	Clare	0-23 - 1-18	Waterford	Cusack Park
19:30	B Duggan (0-13, 7f), I Galvin (0-6), E Quirke (0-1), A McGuane (0-1), S Gleeson (0-1), R Taylor (0-1).	Report	P Curran (1-7, 0-5f), A Gleeson (0-5, 1f, 1'65), Shane Bennett (0-2, 1'65), C Dunford (0-1), DJ Foran (0-1), M Kearney (0-1), C Curran (0-1).	Referee: J Murphy

16 July 2015 Semi-final	Limerick	3-16 - 3-14	Tipperary	Gaelic Grounds
19:30	D Dempsey, C Ryan (3fs) 0-4 each, T Morrissey, C Lynch 1-1 each, R Hanley 1-0, D O'Donovan 0-2, R Lynch 0-2 (1f, 1 '65'), J Kelliher, P Ryan 0-1 each.	Report	J McGrath 0-6 (2fs, 2 '65s'), C O'Riordan 2-0, T Gallagher 1-0, S Cahill 0-2, B Maher, B Heffernan, T Hamill, J Shelley, J Keane (f), M Breen (f) 0-1 each.	Referee: C Lyons (Cork).

30 July 2015 Final	Clare	0-19 - 0-22	Limerick	Cusack Park
19:30	B Duggan (0-6, 5f), I Galvin (0-4), S Gleeson (0-3), E Quirke (0-2), D Conroy (0-1), S O’Donnell (0-1), S Ward (0-1sl), M O’Malley (0-1).	Report	R Lynch (0-13, 8f, 2'65), D Dempsey (0-2), D O’Donovan (0-1), P Ryan (0-1), R Hanley (0-1), C Ryan (0-1), T Morrissey (0-1), C Lynch (0-1), J Kelliher (0-1).	Attendance: 14,311; Referee: F Horgan (Tipperary)

=== Ulster Under-21 Hurling Championship ===
15 July 2015 Semi-final	Antrim	6-22 - 0-7	Armagh	Páirc Mac Uílín
19:45	Conor Johnston (2-2), S McCaughan (1-4, 0-1 free), J O’Connell (1-2), Ciaran Johnston (1-1), J Connolly (0-4, 0-2 frees), P McBride (1-0), C Ross (0-3), N McKenna (0-3), M Connolly (0-1), D Traynor (0-1), T Ó Ciaran (0-1).	Report	R Fullerton (0-2, 0-1 free), S Renaghan (0-2), L Oliver (0-2), T Nevin (0-1).	Referee: A Nash

15 July 2015 Semi-final	Derry	3-16 - 3-14	Down	Owenbeg
20:00	D Foley 0-8, 0-5 frees, C O’Doherty 2-1, T Gallagher (1-0), M McGuigan 0-4, G Bradley 0-3.	Report	C Fitzsimmons 1-4, B Byers 1-2, O McManus 1-2, J Doran 0-2, R Courtney 0-1, M Nicholson 0-1, R McCusker 0-1, E Sands 0-1.	Referee: O Elliott (Antrim)

22 July 2015 Final	Derry	0-17 - 1-19	Antrim	Dean McGlinchey Park
19:30	D Foley (0-11, 10f, 1'65), C O'Doherty (0-2), T McCloskey (0-1), G Bradley (0-1), B Rogers (0-1), M McGuigan (0-1).	Report	C Johnston (1-4, 0-3f), J Connolly (0-3, 1'65), N McKenna (0-3), M Dudley (0-3), S McCaughan (0-2), E Campbell (0-2), M Connolly (0-1), C Ross (0-1).	Referee: J Clarke

=== All-Ireland Under-21 Hurling Championship ===
22 August 2015 Semi-final	Wexford	1-20 - 1-8	Antrim	Semple Stadium
	C McDonald 0-7 (4f, 1 65, 1 sl), C Devitt 1-2, T French 0-3, A Kenny, K Foley & C Dunbar 0-2 each, P Foley & S Kenny 0-1 each.	Report	C McNaughton 1-2 (0-2f), E Campbell 0-2, S McCaughan (f), R McCambridge, D McMullan & M Connolly 0-1 each.	Referee: S Cleere (Kilkenny)

22 August 2015 Semi-final	Galway	0-17 - 1-20	Limerick	Semple Stadium
	J Flynn (0-7, 2f, 2 65s, 1 sl), B Molloy (0-5), D Nevin (0-2), E Brannigan (0-1), S Cooney (0-1), C Whelan (0-1).	Report	T Morrissey (1-3), D Dempsey (0-4), C Ryan (0-3), R Lynch (0-3, 2f, 1 sl), D Byrnes (0-2), D O’Donovan (0-2), C Lynch (0-1), B Nash (0-1), G Hegarty (0-1).	Referee: F Horgan (Tipperary)

12 September 2015 Final	Wexford	1-7 - 0-26	Limerick	Semple Stadium
19:00	C McDonald (1-4, 0-3 frees, 0-1 sc); P Foley (0-1 free), A Kenny, C Dunbar (0-1 each).	Report	R Lynch (0-6, 0-5 frees); B Nash (0-5); T Morrissey (0-4); P Casey (0-1 free), P Ryan, C Lynch (0-3 each); D Byrnes (0-2, 0-1 free).	Referee: J Ryan (Tipperary)

== Statistics ==
=== Top scorers ===
Overall

Rank	Player	County	Tally	Total	Matches	Average
1	Conor McDonald	Wexford	3-38	47	5	9.40
2	Ronan Lynch	Limerick	0-24	24	4	6.00
3	Patrick Curran	Waterford	1-19	22	2	11.00
4	Déaglán Foley	Derry	0-19	19	2	9.50
4	Bobby Duggan	Clare	0-19	19	2	9.50
6	Tom Morrissey	Limerick	2-09	15	4	3.75
6	Conor Johnston	Antrim	3-06	15	2	7.50
8	Kevin Foley	Wexford	0-14	14	5	2.80
9	Dylan Murray	Offaly	0-11	11	2	5.50
9	Kevin McDonnell	Carlow	0-11	11	2	5.50

Single game

Rank	Player	County	Tally	Total	Opposition
1	Conor McDonald	Wexford	1-10	13	Kilkenny
1	Bobby Duggan	Clare	0-13	13	Waterford
1	Ronan Lynch	Limerick	0-13	13	Clare
4	Conor McDonald	Wexford	0-12	12	Kildare
4	Patrick Curran	Waterford	0-12	12	Cork
6	Cha Dwyer	Laois	3-01	10	Carlow
6	Patrick Curran	Waterford	1-07	10	Clare
8	Gerry Keegan	Kildare	0-09	9	Wexford
9	Conor Johnston	Antrim	2-02	8	Armagh
9	Conor McDonald	Wexford	1-05	8	Offaly
9	Déaglán Foley	Derry	0-08	8	Down
9	Conal Fitzsimmons	Down	0-08	8	Derry

=== Scoring ===
- Widest winning margin: 33 points
  - Antrim 6-22 - 0-7 Armagh (Ulster semi-final)
- Most goals in a match: 6
  - Laois 4-7 - 2-15 Carlow (Leinster quarter-final)
  - Dublin 2-16 - 4-12 Kilkenny (Leinster quarter-final)
  - Antrim 6-22 - 0-7 Armagh (Ulster semi-final)
  - Derry 3-16 - 3-14 Down (Ulster semi-final)
  - Limerick 3-16 - 3-14 Tipperary (Munster semi-final)
- Most points in a match: 41
  - Clare 0-23 - 1-18 Waterford (Munster semi-final)
- Most goals by one team in a match: 6
  - Antrim 6-22 - 0-7 Armagh (Ulster semi-final)
- Highest aggregate score: 47
  - Antrim 6-22 - 0-7 Armagh (Ulster semi-final)
- Most goals scored by a losing team: 4
  - Laois 4-7 - 2-15 Carlow (Leinster quarter-final)

=== Miscellaneous ===
- Wexford win a third successive Leinster title. It is the third time in their history that they have achieved the three-in-a-row and the first time since 1971.
- Antrim win a record-breaking seventh successive Ulster title.

== Broadcasting ==
These matches were broadcast live on television in Ireland by TG4:

Round	Game
Leinster Championship	Dublin vs Kilkenny; Offaly vs Wexford; Wexford vs Kilkenny
Munster Championship	Cork vs Waterford; Clare vs Waterford; Limerick vs Tipperary; Limerick vs Clare
All-Ireland Championship	Antrim vs Wexford; Limerick vs Galway; Wexford vs Limerick

== Awards ==
Team of the Year

1. Dave McCarthy
2. Liam Ryan
3. Richie English
4. Michael Breen
5. Diarmaid Byrnes
6. Barry O'Connell
7. Jack O'Connor
8. Darragh O'Donovan
9. Pat Ryan
10. Bobby Duggan
11. Cian Lynch
12. Ian Galvin
13. Brian Molloy
14. Conor McDonald
15. Tom Morrissey
