= Fitzgibbon Cup =

Irish collegiate hurling championship

- Current season or competition: 2026 Fitzgibbon Cup
- Irish: Corn Mhic Giobúin
- Code: Hurling
- Founded: 1912
- Region: Universities (GAA)
- Title holders: University of Limerick (10th title)
- Most titles: University College Cork (40 titles)
- Sponsors: Electric Ireland
- Official website: www.gaa.ie/highereducation/fixtures-and-results/fitzgibbon-cup/

The Fitzgibbon Cup (Irish: Corn Mhic Giobúin) is the trophy for the premier hurling championship among higher education institutions (universities, colleges and institutes of technology) in Ireland.

The Fitzgibbon Cup competition is administered by Comhairle Ard Oideachais Cumann Lúthchleas Gael (CLG), the GAA's Higher Education Council. Comhairle Ard Oideachais also oversees the Ryan Cup (tier 2 hurling championship), the Fergal Maher Cup (tier 3 hurling championship) and the Padraig MacDiarmada (tier 4 hurling championship).

The GAA Higher Education Cups are sponsored by Electric Ireland.

== History ==
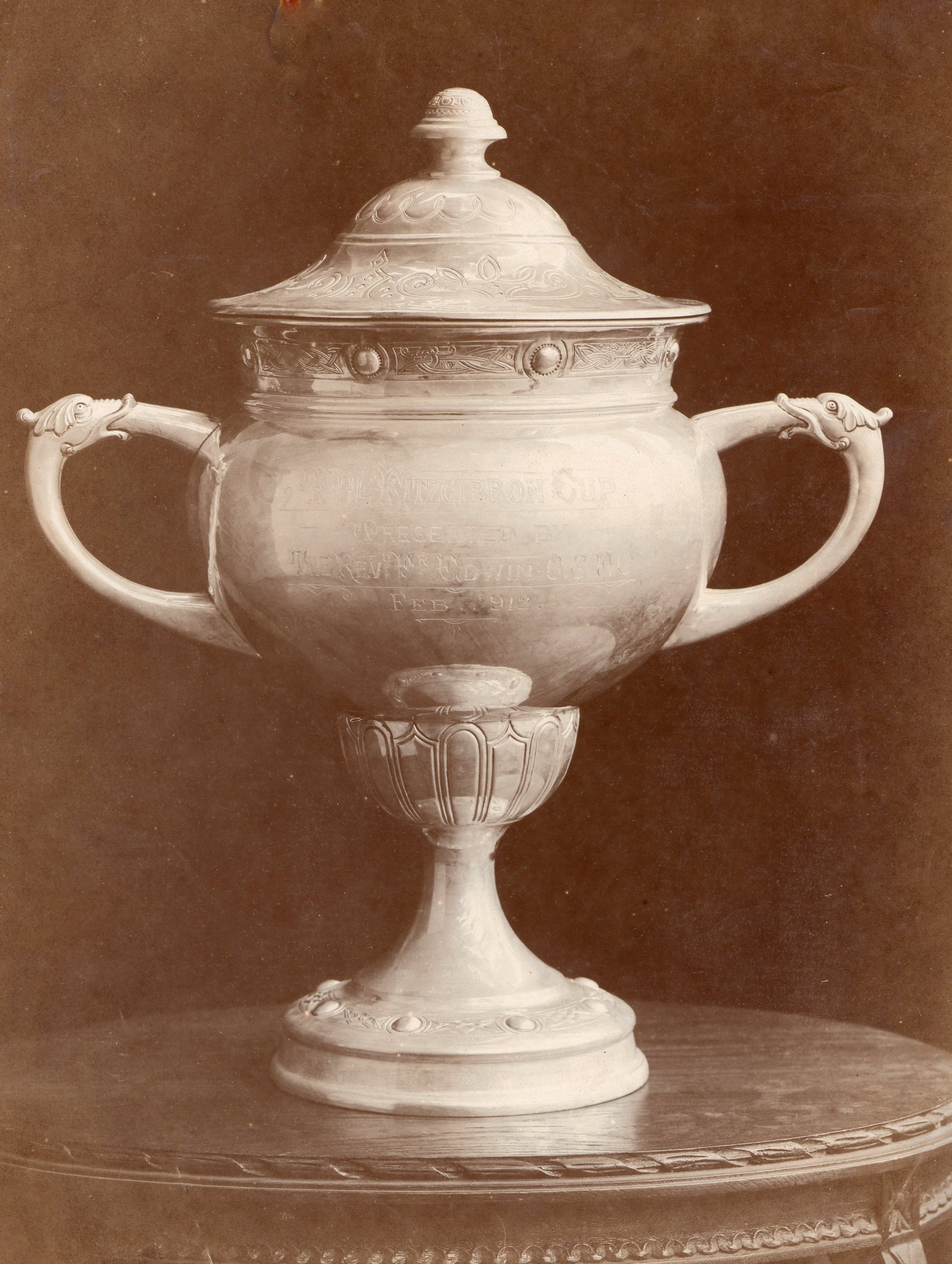
The Fitzgibbon Cup was donated by the Rev Fr Edwin Fitzgibbon O.S.F.C. for Inter-Collegiate Hurling competition. The silver cup was made in Cork by the silversmiths William Egan & Sons in February 1912. It is 24 inches in height. A detachable lid was lost in 1973 and never replaced. Celtic tracing designs are engraved around the edges of the trophy.

The cup is named after Dr. Edwin Fitzgibbon, a Capuchin friar and, from 1911 to 1936, who was Professor of Philosophy at University College Cork. In 1912 Dr. Fitzgibbon donated most of his annual salary to purchase the trophy. The cup was made at William Egan and Sons' silversmiths, Cork, and bears a large inscription on its front: The Fitzgibbon Cup, Donated by The Rev Fr Edwin O.S.F.C. Feb. 1912. It was a 24-inch-tall, large silver trophy, with a round base and a stem that narrowed and then expanded again in support of a wide spherical body, with Old Celtic tracing designs featuring around the edges. It had a circular, open head, on which was placed a detachable lid. The lid was lost on the night of the 1973 tournament final at Galway and has never been replaced.

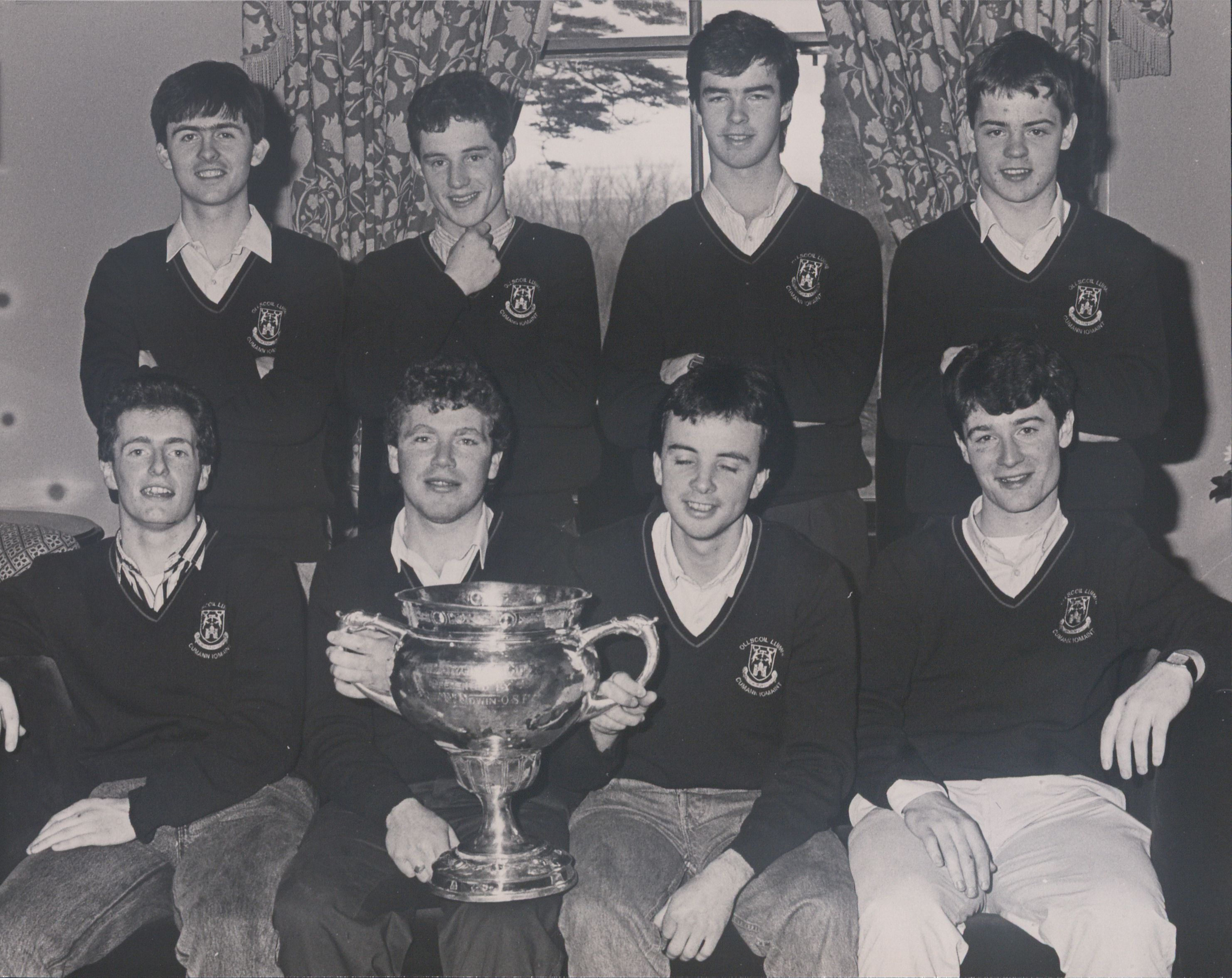
National Institute for Higher Education, Limerick team with the cup, 1989

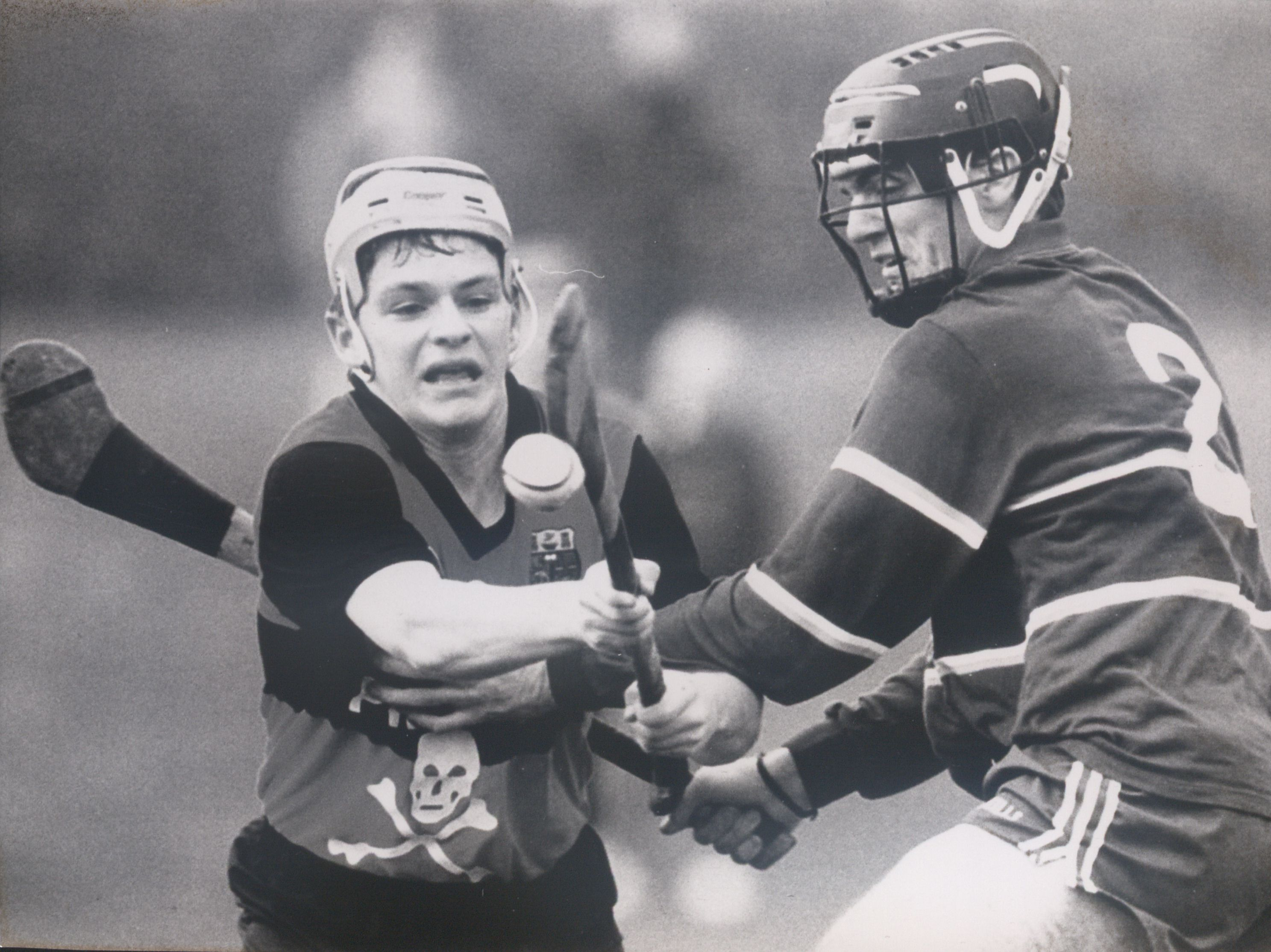
Action from the 1996 final, UL v. UCC.

The competition was played on a round-robin basis until 1949, when a straight knockout format was adopted. For the first 30 years, the cup was dominated by UCC and UCD, with UCG winning occasionally. Queen's University Belfast first took part in 1946, and won their only title in 1953. Each of the NUI Colleges had the cup withheld from them once: In 1933 UCC was awarded custody of the cup, but was not declared the formal winner, following a successful objection to three players on the UCD winning team; in 1940 the Cup was not awarded to any team, after UCC, which had won both its games, was deemed to have an irregular team; and in 1954 the cup was withheld from UCG and the tournament declared null and void after an investigation into the legality of the Galway team and violent scenes at the tournament.

The popularity of the championship grew, and, in the 60s and 70s three more colleges entered: Trinity College Dublin, UU Coleraine and NUI Maynooth. The eight-in-a-row sequence of victories recorded by UCC from 1981 to 1988 was the greatest in the history of the competition. In the late 1980s, all teams in Division One of the Higher Education League were admitted. In 1989 NIHE Limerick (now University of Limerick) became the first non-university Fitzgibbon Cup champions. Since 2001/02 Institutes of Technology have become top guns in the tournament. Waterford IT won the title four times and Limerick IT, the Cup twice in six years (2002/03 through 2007/08). In the remaining six years Cork IT, Limerick IT and Waterford IT have each been losing finalists twice. UCC are the leaders in the roll of honour with 38 titles, the last in 2013.

The first local derby final took place between Limerick Institute of Technology and the University of Limerick at the Gaelic Grounds, Limerick in March 2005; the same institutions met again in the final at Waterford in March 2011. The final in 2012 was a Cork local derby between Cork IT and UCC. The first Fitzgibbon final between Institutes of Technology, also a Munster derby match, took place in 2008 between Waterford IT and Limerick IT.

The Fitzgibbon Cup final was played in Limerick in 2014/15, hosted by Limerick Institute of Technology. The final, which brought together the University of Limerick and the 2014 champions Waterford Institute of Technology ended in a 3-13 to 0-21 draw at the Gaelic Grounds. In the replay at Páirc Úi Rinn in Cork, the University of Limerick emerged victorious, winning the Fitzgibbon Cup for the 5th time which UL last won in 2011.

== Teams ==
=== 2025 teams ===
The following 11 teams will contest the 2025 Fitzgibbon Cup:

College	Location	Colours	Province	Titles	Last title
University of Limerick			Munster		
Mary Immaculate College			Munster		
SETU Waterford			Munster		
ATU Galway			Connacht		
University College Cork			Munster		
MTU Cork			Munster		
University of Galway			Connacht		
University College Dublin			Leinster		
TUS Midwest			Munster		
DCU Dóchas Éireann			Leinster		
Maynooth University			Leinster		

== Roll of honour ==
=== Colleges by wins ===
Two Fitzgibbon Cups tournament were not played (1920/21 and 1942/43), one tournament was declared null and void (1953/54), and in 1932/33 and 1939/40 the Cup and winners' medals were not awarded.

Team	County	Wins	Last win
University College Cork (UCC)	Cork	40	2020
University College Dublin (UCD)	Dublin	32	2001
NUI Galway (NUIG, formerly University College Galway)	Galway	10	2010
University of Limerick (UL;formerly NIHE. Limerick)	Limerick	10	2026
Waterford IT (now South East Technological University, Waterford)	Waterford	9	2014
Mary Immaculate College	Limerick	3	2024
Limerick Institute of Technology (LIT; now Technical University Shannon (TUS))	Limerick	2	2007
Maynooth University (NUIM, formerly St. Patrick's College)	Kildare	2	1974
Queen's University Belfast (QUB)	Antrim	1	1953

Finalists who have not won the Fitzgibbon Cup:

- Cork Institute of Technology (now Munster Technological University, Cork)
- Garda Síochána College
- Institute of Technology Carlow (now South East Technological University, Carlow)
- DCU Dóchas Éireann

=== Fitzgibbon Cup Champion Colleges ===
- 1911/12 UCD
- 1912/13 UCC
- 1913/14 UCC
- 1914/15 UCD
- 1915/16 UCD
- 1916/17 UCD
- 1917/18 UCC
- 1918/19 UCG
- 1919/20 UCC
- 1920/21 Not played
- 1921/22 UCC
- 1922/23 UCD
- 1923/24 UCD
- 1924/25 UCC
- 1925/26 UCG
- 1926/27 UCD
- 1927/28 UCC
- 1928/29 UCC
- 1929/30 UCC
- 1930/31 UCC
- 1931/32 UCD
- 1932/33 No formal winner
- 1933/34 UCD
- 1934/35 UCD
- 1935/36 UCD
- 1936/37 UCD
- 1937/38 UCD
- 1938/39 UCC
- 1939/40 Cup & medals not awarded
- 1940/41 UCD
- 1941/42 UCG
- 1942/43 Not played
- 1943/44 UCD
- 1944/45 UCG
- 1945/46 UCG
- 1946/47 UCC
- 1947/48 UCD
- 1948/49 UCG
- 1949/50 UCD
- 1950/51 UCD
- 1951/52 UCD
- 1952/53 QUB
- 1953/54 Null & void
- 1954/55 UCD
- 1955/56 UCC
- 1956/57 UCC
- 1957/58 UCD
- 1958/59 UCC
- 1959/60 UCD
- 1960/61 UCD
- 1961/62 UCC
- 1962/63 UCC
- 1963/64 UCD
- 1964/65 UCD
- 1965/66 UCC
- 1966/67 UCC
- 1967/68 UCD
- 1968/69 UCD
- 1969/70 UCG
- 1970/71 UCC
- 1971/72 UCC
- 1972/73 SPC Maynooth
- 1973/74 SPC Maynooth
- 1974/75 UCD
- 1975/76 UCC
- 1976/77 UCG
- 1977/78 UCD
- 1978/79 UCD
- 1979/80 UCG
- 1980/81 UCC
- 1981/82 UCC
- 1982/83 UCC
- 1983/84 UCC
- 1984/85 UCC
- 1985/86 UCC
- 1986/87 UCC
- 1987/88 UCC
- 1988/89 NIHE Limerick
- 1989/90 UCC
- 1990/91 UCC
- 1991/92 Waterford RTC
- 1992/93 UCD
- 1993/94 UL
- 1994/95 Waterford RTC
- 1995/96 UCC
- 1996/97 UCC
- 1997/98 UCC
- 1998/99 Waterford IT
- 1999/00 Waterford IT
- 2000/01 UCD
- 2001/02 UL
- 2002/03 Waterford IT
- 2003/04 Waterford IT
- 2004/05 Limerick IT
- 2005/06 Waterford IT
- 2006/07 Limerick IT
- 2007/08 Waterford IT
- 2008/09 UCC
- 2009/10 NUI Galway
- 2010/11 UL
- 2011/12 UCC
- 2012/13 UCC
- 2013/14 Waterford IT
- 2014/15 UL
- 2015/16 Mary Immaculate College
- 2016/17 Mary Immaculate College
- 2017/18 UL
- 2018/19 UCC
- 2019/20 UCC
- 2020/21 No competition
- 2021/22 UL
- 2022/23 UL
- 2023/24 Mary Immaculate College
- 2024/25 UL
- 2025/26 UL

=== Fitzgibbon Shield [Plate] winners ===
The Fitzgibbon Shield [Plate] competition was introduced in 1976/77 for the teams beaten in the quarter-finals of the Fitzgibbon Cup. As a consequence of the Sigerson Cup shenanigans in February 1990, the 1990/91 Fitzgibbon Cup format was changed to a two-day event to cool the social side of this hurling festival. Thus, the Fitzgibbon Shield matches in 1991/92 and 1992/93 were contested between the losing semi-finalists.

- 1975/76 TCD winners in Cork - Sc. Mhic Giobuin '76 Col na Trinoide
- 1976/77 QUB 2-13 TCD 2-6
- 1977/78 SPC Maynooth 10-12 NUU† 2-3
- 1978/79 QUB 3-10 TCD 3-6
- 1979/80 QUB 1-7 TCD 1-2
- 1980/81 TCD v QUB or NUU
- 1981/82 TCD v QUB or SPC Maynooth
- 1982/83 QUB 0-7 SPC Maynooth 1-0
- 1983/84 QUB 4-8 NUU† 1-6
- 1984/85 UU Jordanstown 3-8 SPC Maynooth 2-10
- 1985/86 UU Coleraine v SPC Maynooth
- 1986/87 SPC Maynooth 1-7 UU Jordanstown 1-5
- 1987/88 TCD 1-8 UU Jordanstown 1-2
- 1988/89 TCD 2-12 Galway RTC 1-14
- 1989/90 UCG 3-10 Cork RTC 3-4
- 1990/91 TCD beat UCD
- 1991/92 UCC 2-10 UCD 1-12
- 1992/93 Waterford RTC 4-13 UL 3-5

† New University of Ulster

=== Captains of winning teams ===
Unpublished list kindly provided by Dónal McAnallen

Academic Year	Captain	College	County
1911/12	Edmond J. Ryan	UCD	Tipperary
1912/13	Peter M. Murphy	UCC	Cork
1913/14	Jim Reidy	UCC	Limerick
1914/15	Éamon Bulfin	UCD	Offaly
1915/16	John Ryan	UCD	Limerick & Dublin
1916/17	John Ryan	UCD	Limerick & Dublin
1917/18	Con Lucey	UCC	Cork
1918/19	Martin Fahy	UCG	
1919/20	John R. Lahiffe	UCC	Cork
1920/21	Not played	—	—
1921/22	Not available	UCC	—
1922/23	Tommy Daly	UCD	Clare & Dublin
1923/24	Tommy Daly	UCD	Clare & Dublin
1924/25	Tom Lee	UCC	Tipperary
1925/26	Terence O'Grady	UCG	Limerick
1926/27	Owen O'Neill	UCD	Limerick
1927/28	Richard Molloy	UCC	Tipperary
1928/29	Paddy O'Donovan	UCC	Cork
1929/30	Patrick O'Donnell	UCC	Cork
1930/31	William Finlay	UCC	Tipperary
1931/32	Jack Walsh	UCD	Waterford
1932/33	Richard Cronin	UCC	Cork
1933/34	Séamus Hogan	UCD	Clare
1934/35	Tom Loughnane	UCD	Clare
1935/36	Tony Mac Sullivan	UCD	Limerick
1936/37	Mossie Roche	UCC	Limerick
1937/38	Jimmy Cooney	UCD	Tipperary
1938/39	Jackie Spencer	UCC	Cork
1939/40	Jim Young; Cup not awarded	UCC	Cork
1940/41	Billy O'Neill	UCC	Kilkenny
1941/42	Pat Hehir	UCG	Galway
1942/43	Not played	—	—
1943/44	Dick Stokes	UCD	Limerick
1944/45	Michael "Miko" Doyle	UCG	Galway
1945/46	Michael "Miko" Doyle	UCG	Galway
1946/47	Mick Herlihy	UCC	Cork
1947/48	Frank Commons	UCD	Tipperary & Dublin
1948/49	Johnny Scanlon	UCG	Galway
1949/50	Mick Maher	UCD	Tipperary
1950/51	Martin Fitzgerald	UCD	Tipperary & Dublin
1951/52	Des Dillon	UCD	Clare & Dublin
1952/53	Ted McConnell	QUB	Antrim
1953/54	Pádraig "Paddy" O'Donoghue; Declared null & void	UCG	Waterford
1954/55	Pat Teahan	UCC	Waterford
1955/56	Johnny Dwane	UCC	Cork
1956/57	Tony Murphy	UCC	Cork
1957/58	Bernard Hoey	UCD	Clare
1958/59	Steve Long	UCC	Limerick
1959/60	Donie Nealon	UCD	Tipperary
1960/61	Owen O'Neill	UCD	Limerick
1961/62	Jimmy Byrne	UCC	Waterford
1962/63	Des Kiely	UCC	Tipperary
1963/64	Seán Quinlivan	UCD	Clare
1964/65	Murt Duggan	UCD	Tipperary
1965/66	Willie Cronin	UCC	Cork
1966/67	Seánie Barry	UCC	Cork
1967/68	Jim Furlong	UCD	Wexford
1968/69	Pat Kavanagh	UCD	Kilkenny
1969/70	Séamus Hogan	UCG	Tipperary
1970/71	Pat McDonnell	UCC	Cork
1971/72	Mick McCarthy	UCC	Cork
1972/73	Paudie Fitzmaurice	St Patrick's College Maynooth	Limerick
1973/74	Paddy Barry	St Patrick's College Maynooth	Cork
1974/75	Séamus Ryan	UCD	Tipperary
1975/76	Donal McGovern	UCC	Cork
1976/77	Pat Fleury	UCG	Offaly
1977/78	John Martin	UCD	Kilkenny
1978/79	Tom Breen	UCD	Wexford
1979/80	Vincent Daly	UCG	Clare
1980/81	John Minogue	UCC	Clare
1981/82	John Farrell	UCC	Tipperary
1982/83	Tadhg Coakley	UCC	Cork
1983/84	Mick Boylan	UCC	Cork
1984/85	Nicholas English	UCC	Tipperary
1985/86	Paul O'Connor	UCC	Cork
1986/87	John Grainger	UCC	Cork
1987/88	Andy O'Callaghan	UCC	Cork
1988/89	Dan Treacy	NIHE Limerick	Clare
1989/90	Mick Crowe	UCC	Limerick
1990/91	Pat Heffernan	UCC	Limerick
1991/92	Páraic Fanning	Waterford RTC	Tipperary
1992/93	Jim Byrne	UCD	Wexford
1993/94	Daragh O'Neill	UL	Limerick
1994/95	Colm Bonnar	Waterford RTC	Tipperary
1995/96	Frank Lohan	UCC	Clare
1996/97	Kieran Morrison	UCC	Cork
1997/98	Eddie Enright	UCC	Tipperary
1998/99	Andy Moloney	Waterford IT	Tipperary
1999/00	Andy Moloney	Waterford IT	Tipperary
2000/01	David Hegarty	UCD	Clare
2001/02	Eoin Fitzgerald	UL	Cork
2002/03	Paul Curran	Waterford IT	Tipperary
2003/04	J.J. Delaney	Waterford IT	Kilkenny
2004/05	Eoin Kelly	Limerick IT	Tipperary
2005/06	Brian Dowling	Waterford IT	Kilkenny
	Hugh Maloney	Waterford IT	Tipperary
2006/07	Kieran Murphy	Limerick IT	Cork
2007/08	Kevin Moran	Waterford IT	Waterford
2008/09	Kevin Hartnett	UCC	Cork
2009/10	Finian Coone	NUI Galway	Galway
2010/11	Kieran Joyce	UL	Kilkenny
2011/12	Shane Bourke	UCC	Tipperary
2012/13	Darren McCarthy	UCC	Cork
2013/14	Eoin Murphy	Waterford IT	Kilkenny
2014/15	David McInerney	UL	Clare
2015/16	Richie English	Mary Immaculate College	Limerick
2016/17	Eoin Quirke	Mary Immaculate College	Clare
2017/18	John McGrath	University of Limerick	Tipperary
2018/19	Eoghan Murphy Jt Capt; Conor Browne Jt Capt	University College Cork	Kildare; Kilkenny
2019/20	Eoghan Murphy Jt Capt; Paddy O'Loughlin Jt Capt	University College Cork	Kildare; Limerick
2020/21	Not held due to COVID-19 restrictions		
2021/22	Bryan O'Mara	University of Limerick	Tipperary
2022/23	Bryan O'Mara Jt Capt Mark Rodgers Jt Capt	University of Limerick	Tippeary Clare
2023/24	Colin O'Brien	Mary Immaculate College	Cork
2024/25	Colin Coughlan	University of Limerick	Limerick

=== Man of the Match/Player of the Tournament and winning team top scorers ===
The accolade of Man of the Match or Player of the Tournament dates from the 1980s. The "Player of the Tournament", e.g., 1983/84, or "Man of the Match", e.g., 2004/05, was not always from the winning team. Top scorer refers to the player with the highest points tally on the winning side in the final.

Academic Year	MotM/PotT	Top Scorer	College	County	Points Scored
1980/81					
		Michael "Mick" Kelleher	UCC	Cork	1-2
1981/82					
		Nicky English	UCC	Tipperary	0-10
1982/83					
		Michael "Mick" Quaide	UCC	Limerick	3-2
1983/84	Denis Corry		UCD	Clare	
		Colm O'Neill	UCC	Cork	0-4
1984/85					
		Colm O'Neill	UCC	Cork	0-5
1985/86					
		Michael Walsh	UCC	Kilkenny	2-1
1986/87					
		Mark Foley	UCC	Cork	0-5
1987/88	John Lee		UCG	Clare	0-0
		Tony O'Sullivan	UCC	Cork	0-5
1988/89					
		Brian Stapleton	NIHE Limerick	Limerick	0-6
1989/90					
		Brian Cunningham	UCC	Cork	1-3
1990/91	Brian Cunningham		UCC	Cork	0-5
		John Ryan	UCC	Offaly	1-2
1991/92	Noel Dalton	Noel Dalton	Waterford RTC	Waterford	0-10
1992/93	Dan O'Neill		UCD	Kilkenny	0-4(3f)
		Jim Byrne	UCD	Wexford	2-7(4f)
1993/94	Brian Lohan		UL	Clare	0-0
		Colm O'Doherty	UL	Galway	1-5
1994/95	Tommy Dunne		Waterford RTC	Tipperary	0-6
		Barry Walsh	Waterford RTC	Cork	2-1
1995/96	Johnny Collins		UCC	Cork	0-0
		Johnny Enright	UCC	Tipperary	0-7
1996/97	Johnny Enright	Johnny Enright	UCC	Tipperary	0-9(6f)
1997/98	Seánie McGrath	Seánie McGrath	UCC	Cork	1-4
1998/99	Éamonn Corcoran		Waterford IT	Tipperary	
		Declan Browne	Waterford IT	Tipperary	2-2
1999/00	Éamonn Corcoran		Waterford IT	Tipperary	0-1(1f)
		Henry Shefflin	Waterford IT	Kilkenny	1-5(5f)
2000/01					
		Pat Fitzgerald	UCD	Waterford	0-9(8f)
		Pat Fitzgerald	UCD (Replay)	Waterford	0-6(4f,2 '65)
		Alan Barry	UCD (Replay)	Kilkenny	2-0
2001/02	Richie Murray		University of Limerick	Galway	0-3
		Conor Fitzgerald	University of Limerick	Limerick	0-7(6f)
2002/03	Ken Coogan		Waterford IT	Kilkenny	0-0
		Brian Dowling	Waterford IT	Kilkenny	0-3(2f)
2003/04	Ken Coogan		Waterford IT	Kilkenny	0-0
		Rory Jacob	Waterford IT	Wexford	0-4(4f)
2004/05	John Devane		University of Limerick	Tipperary	0-0
		Eoin Kelly	Limerick IT	Tipperary	1-9(1-7f)
2005/06	Eoin Reid		Waterford IT	Kilkenny	1-4
		Willie Ryan	Waterford IT	Tipperary	3-0
2006/07	John Lee		NUI Galway	Galway	0-0
		Joe Canning	Limerick IT	Galway	1-8(4f)
2007/08	Joe Canning		Limerick IT	Galway	1-16(1-10f, 4 side-line cuts)
		Ray McLoughney	Waterford IT	Tipperary	0-12(10f, 1 '65)
2008/09	Joe Jordan		UCC	Cork	
		John Mulhall	UCC	Kilkenny	1-3
2009/10	Timmy Hammersley		Waterford IT	Tipperary	1-11 (9fs)
		Finian Coone	NUI Galway	Galway	0-9(6f, 1 '65)
2010/11	David Burke	David Burke	UL	Galway	0-4(1f)
		Pa Cronin	UL	Cork	0-4
		Andrew Quinn	UL	Clare	0-4(3f)
2011/12	Stephen White		Cork IT	Cork	0-1
		Pauric Mahony	UCC	Waterford	0-6(6f)
2012/13	Conor Lehane	Conor Lehane	UCC	Cork	1-9(7f)
2013/14	Jake Dillon	Jake Dillon	Waterford IT	Waterford	0-4
		Pauric Mahony	Waterford IT	Waterford	0-4 (4f)
2014/15 (Replay)	Tony Kelly	Tony Kelly	UL	Clare	0-6 (2f)
		John McGrath (Tipperary hurler)	UL	Tipperary	0-5 (3f)
(replay)		John McGrath (Tipperary hurler)	UL	Tipperary	0-6 (4f)
2015/16	Declan Hannon	Declan Hannon	Mary Immaculate College	Limerick	1-12 (0-9f)
2016/17	Cian Lynch		Mary Immaculate College	Limerick	0-03
		Aaron Gillane	Mary Immaculate College	Limerick	1-05 (1 pen, 4f)
2017/18	David Fitzgerald		University of Limerick	Clare	0-02
		Jason Forde	University of Limerick	Tipperary	1-10 (7f, 1 '65')
2018/19	Mark Kehoe		University College Cork	Tipperary	1-04
2021-22	Bryan O'Mara		University of Limerick	Tipperary	0-04
2022-23	Michael Kiely	Gearoid O'Connor	University of Limerick	Tipperary	0-9, (0-8f)
2023-24	Joe Caesar (hurler)	Gearóid O'Connor			

== Finals listed by year ==
First win in bold type.

Academic Year	Winners	Score	Runners-up	Score	Venue	Date
1911/12	**University College Dublin** (UCD)	6-00	University College Galway (UCG)	1-01	Jones's Road, Dublin	26 April 1912
	University College Cork (UCC)	8-03	University College Galway (UCG)	1-01	Jones's Road, Dublin	27 April 1912
	**University College Dublin** (UCD)	1-00	University College Cork (UCC)	0-02	Jones's Road, Dublin	28 April 1912
1912/13	**University College Cork** (UCC)	6-01	University College Galway (UCG)	0-00	College Grnds, Galway	11 April 1913
	**University College Dublin** (UCD)	2-01	University College Galway (UCG)	0-00	College Grnds, Galway	12 April 1913
	**University College Cork** (UCC)	5-01	University College Dublin (UCD)	1-00	College Grnds, Galway	13 April 1913
1913/14	University College Dublin (UCD)	9-04	University College Galway (UCG)	2-04	The Mardyke, Cork	19 February 1914
	University College Cork (UCC)	15-02	University College Galway (UCG)	1-02	The Beaumont, Ballintemple	21 February 1914
	University College Cork (UCC)	4-03	University College Dublin (UCD)	2-02	The Mardyke, Cork	22 February 1914
1914/15	University College Dublin (UCD)	6-00	University College Cork (UCC)	3-00	University Park, Terenure, Dublin	2 March 1915
1915/16	University College Dublin (UCD)	7-02	University College Cork (UCC)	1-02	The Mardyke, Cork	27 February 1916
1916/17	University College Dublin (UCD)	3-02	University College Cork (UCC)	2-01	Terenure, Dublin	18 February 1917
1917/18	University College Cork (UCC)	5-02	University College Dublin (UCD)	1-04	The Mardyke, Cork	22 May 1918
1918/19	**University College, Galway**	3-02	University College Cork (UCC)	1-01	South Park, Galway	9 May 1919
	University College Cork (UCC)	0-23	University College Dublin (UCD)	0-22	South Park, Galway	10 May 1919
	University College Dublin (UCD)	0-23	**University College Galway** (UCG)	0-18	South Park, Galway	11 May 1919
1919/20	University College Cork (UCC)	3-04	University College Dublin (UCD)	3-03	Terenure, Dublin	12 May 1920
1920/21	Not played	—	—	—	—	—
1921/22	University College Cork (UCC)	6-01	University College Dublin (UCD)	3-02	The Mardyke, Cork	3 May 1922
1922/23	University College Cork (UCC)	1-06	University College Galway (UCG)	1-03	South Park, Galway	27 April 1923
	University College Dublin (UCD)	8-03	University College Galway (UCG)	3-02	South Park, Galway	28 April 1923
	University College Dublin (UCD)	3-02	University College Cork (UCC)	2-02	South Park, Galway	29 April 1923
1923/24	University College Dublin (UCD)	10-04	University College Galway (UCG)	3-01	Terenure, Dublin	9 May 1924
	University College Cork (UCC)	4-03	University College Galway (UCG)	0-03	Terenure, Dublin	10 May 1924
	University College Dublin (UCD)	6-02	University College Cork (UCC)	4-05	Terenure, Dublin	11 May 1924
1924/25	University College Cork (UCC)	7-01	University College Dublin (UCD)	2-02	The Mardyke, Cork	3 May 1925
1925/26	University College, Galway	4-10	University College Cork (UCC)	1-01	South Park, Galway	30 April 1926
	University College Cork (UCC)	3-01	University College Dublin (UCD)	3-00	South Park, Galway	1 May 1926
	University College Dublin (UCD)	2-02	University College Galway (UCG)	1-02	South Park, Galway	2 May 1926
1926/27	University College Dublin (UCD)	5-02	University College Cork (UCC)	1-03	Belfield, Dublin	8 May 1927
1927/28	University College Cork (UCC)	11-05	University College Dublin (UCD)	2-00	The Mardyke, Cork	26 February 1928
1928/29	University College Dublin (UCD)	5-08	University College Galway (UCG)	0-01	Terenure, Dublin	22 February 1929
	University College Cork (UCC)	7-03	University College Galway (UCG)	2-04	Terenure, Dublin	23 February 1929
	University College Cork (UCC)	8-01	University College Dublin (UCD)	7-02	Terenure, Dublin	24 February 1929
1929/30	University College Cork (UCC)	2-02	University College Galway (UCG)	2-01	Galway Sportsgrounds, Galway	28 February 1930
	University College Dublin (UCD)	8-06	University College Galway (UCG)	3-03	Galway Sportsgrounds, Galway	1 March 1930
	University College Cork (UCC)	5-02	University College Dublin (UCD)	3-01	Galway Sportsgrounds, Galway	2 March 1930
1930/31	University College Cork (UCC)	3-03	University College Galway (UCG)	1-02	The Mardyke, Cork	27 February 1931
	University College Dublin (UCD)	4-03	University College Galway (UCG)	0-03	The Mardyke, Cork	28 February 1931
	University College Cork (UCC)	3-01	University College Dublin (UCD)	0-03	The Mardyke, Cork	1 March 1931
1931/32	University College Dublin (UCD)	8-08	University College Cork (UCC)	1-00	Terenure, Dublin	5 February 1932
	University College Galway (UCG)	5-04	University College Cork (UCC)	2-00	Terenure, Dublin	6 February 1932
	University College Dublin (UCD)	2-8	University College Galway (UCG)	2-1	Terenure, Dublin	7 February 1932
1932/33	University College Dublin (UCD)	7-03	University College Galway (UCG)	4-03	Sports Grnds, Galway	17 February 1933
	University College Cork (UCC)	3-06	University College Galway (UCG)	3-03	Galway Sportsgrounds, Galway	18 February 1933
	University College Dublin (UCD)	5-02	University College Cork (UCC)	4-03	Galway	19 February 1933
1933/34	University College Cork (UCC)	6-05	University College Galway (UCG)	2-04	Cork	23 February 1934
	University College Dublin (UCD)	8-05	University College Galway (UCG)	1-02	Cork	24 February 1934
	University College Cork (UCC)	2-02	University College Dublin (UCD)	1-05	Cork	25 February 1934
	University College Dublin (UCD)	6-01	University College Cork (UCC)	2-02 (Replay)	Limerick	25 March 1934
1934/35	University College Dublin (UCD)	4-01	University College Cork (UCC)	2-03	Terenure, Dublin	22 February 1935
	University College Galway (UCG)	5-06	University College Cork (UCC)	1-06	Terenure, Dublin	23 February 1935
	University College Dublin (UCD)	5-04	University College Galway (UCG)	1-02	Terenure, Dublin	24 February 1935
1935/36	University College Cork (UCC)	7-03	University College Galway (UCG)	4-04	Galway	21 February 1936
	University College Dublin (UCD)	9-03	University College Galway (UCG)	2-00	Galway	22 February 1936
	University College Dublin (UCD)	3-02	University College Cork (UCC)	1-02	Galway	23 February 1936
1936/37	University College Cork (UCC)	5-05	University College Galway (UCG)	2-03	Cork	12 February 1937
	University College Dublin (UCD)		University College Galway (UCG)		Cork	13 February 1937
	University College Cork (UCC)	1-03	University College Dublin (UCD)	0-04	Cork	14 February 1937
1937/38	University College Dublin (UCD)	8-01	University College Galway (UCG)	0-03	Belfield, Dublin	25 February 1938
	University College Cork (UCC)	5-01	University College Galway (UCG)	4-01	Belfield, Dublin	26 February 1938
	University College Dublin (UCD)	4-04	University College Cork (UCC)	2-01	Belfield, Dublin	27 February 1938
1938/39	University College Cork (UCC)	3-03	University College Galway (UCG)	2-01	Galway	10 February 1939
	University College Dublin (UCD)	5-05	University College Galway (UCG)	1-01	Galway	11 February 1939
	University College Cork (UCC)	6-02	University College Dublin (UCD)	0-02	Galway	12 February 1939
1939/40	University College Cork (UCC)	2-05	University College Galway (UCG)	0-00	Douglas Grnds, Cork	16 February 1940
	University College Dublin (UCD)	4-07	University College Galway (UCG)	3-02	Cork	17 February 1940
	University College Cork (UCC); Cup not awarded	6-00	University College Dublin (UCD)	4-03	Cork	18 February 1940
1940/41	University College Dublin (UCD)	2-08	University College Galway (UCG)	2-04	Belfield, Dublin	21 February 1941
	University College Cork (UCC)	7-06	University College Galway (UCG)	2-01	Belfield, Dublin	22 February 1941
	University College Dublin (UCD)	7-10	University College Cork (UCC)	3-01	Belfield, Dublin	23 February 1941
1941/42	University College Galway (UCG)	3-04	University College Dublin (UCD)	2-03	Galway Sportsgrounds, Galway	6 February 1942
	University College Dublin (UCD)	5-02	University College Cork (UCC)	3-04	Galway Sportsgrounds, Galway	7 February 1942
	University College Galway (UCG)	4-06	University College Cork (UCC)	4-05	Galway Sportsgrounds, Galway	8 February 1942
1942/43	Not played	—	—	—	—	—
1943/44	University College Cork (UCC)	5-07	University College Galway (UCG)	1-03	The Mardyke, Cork	25 February 1944
	University College Dublin (UCD)	2-10	University College Galway (UCG)	2-04	The Mardyke, Cork	26 February 1944
	University College Dublin (UCD)	6-05	University College Cork (UCC)	4-02	The Mardyke, Cork	27 February 1944
1944/45	University College Dublin (UCD)	2-06	University College Galway (UCG)	3-02	Belfield, Dublin	16 February 1945
	University College Galway (UCG)	6-04	University College Cork (UCC)	2-03	Belfield, Dublin	17 February 1945
	University College Cork (UCC)	6-01	University College Dublin (UCD)	3-05	Croke Park, Dublin	18 February 1945
1945/46	University College Galway (UCG)	2-03	University College Cork (UCC)	0-04	Sports Grnds, Galway	10 February 1946
1946/47	University College Cork (UCC)	6-05	University College Galway (UCG)	0-00	The Mardyke, Cork	2 March 1947
1947/48	University College Dublin (UCD)	3-05	University College Cork (UCC)	2-00	Belfield, Dublin	1 February 1948
1948/49	University College Galway (UCG)	4-08	University College Dublin (UCD)	3-01	Corrigan Park, Belfast	31 January 1949
1949/50	University College Dublin (UCD)	4-06	University College Galway (UCG)	2-03	Galway	5 February 1950
1950/51	University College Dublin (UCD)	2-06	University College Cork (UCC)	1-03	The Mardyke, Cork	27 January 1951
1951/52	University College Dublin (UCD)	2-12	University College Cork (UCC)	2-02	Croke Park, Dublin	27 January 1952
1952/53	**Queen's University Belfast**	1-03	University College Dublin (UCD)	0-05	Corrigan Park, Belfast	26 April 1953
1953/54	University College, Galway; Competition declared null and void	5-01	University College Dublin (UCD)	0-03	Sports Grnds, Galway	14 February 1954
1954/55	University College Cork (UCC)	7-03	University College Galway (UCG)	1-01	The Mardyke, Cork	13 February 1955
1955/56	University College Cork (UCC)	4-06	University College Dublin (UCD)	3-05	MacDonagh Park, Nenagh, County Tipperary	26 February 1956
1956/57	University College Cork (UCC)	3-08	University College Galway (UCG)	2-06	Fahy's Field, Galway	18 November 1956
1957/58	University College Dublin (UCD)	7-09	University College Galway (UCG)	2-01	The Mardyke, Cork	1 December 1957
1958/59	University College Cork (UCC)	4-08	University College Dublin (UCD)	3-02	Casement Park, Belfast	16 November 1958
1959/60	University College Dublin (UCD)	4-10	University College Cork (UCC)	4-03	Croke Park, Dublin	29 November 1959
1960/61	University College Dublin (UCD)	3-06	University College Galway (UCG)	3-04	Pearse Stadium, Salthill, Galway	4 December 1960
1961/62	University College Cork (UCC)	5-09	University College Galway (UCG)	1-06	The Mardyke, Cork	19 November 1961
1962/63	University College Cork (UCC)	3-05	University College Dublin (UCD)	2-02	Casement Park, Belfast	18 November 1962
1963/64	University College Dublin (UCD)	4-07	University College Cork (UCC)	4-03	Croke Park, Dublin	8 March 1964
1964/65	University College Dublin (UCD)	4-08	University College Galway (UCG)	4-02	Pearse Stadium, Galway	22 November 1964
1965/66	University College Cork (UCC)	5-05	University College Dublin (UCD)	3-03	The Mardyke, Cork	21 November 1965
1966/67	University College Cork (UCC)	3-17	University College Galway (UCG)	2-05	Croke Park, Dublin	5 March 1967
1967/68	University College Dublin (UCD)	1-15	University College Cork (UCC)	2-01	Casement Park, Belfast	3 March 1968
1968/69	University College Dublin (UCD)	1-12	University College Cork (UCC)	1-10	Croke Park, Dublin	23 February 1969
1969/70	University College Galway (UCG)	4-08	University College Dublin (UCD)	2-12 (AET)	Pearse Stadium, Galway	8 March 1970
1970/71	University College Cork (UCC)	2-16	University College Galway (UCG)	2-06	The Mardyke, Cork	28 February 1971
1971/72	University College Cork (UCC)	3-11	University College Galway (UCG)	0-06	Croke Park, Dublin	12 March 1972
1972/73	**St. Patrick's College, Maynooth**	2-12	University College Galway (UCG)	4-04	Pearse Stadium, Galway	11 March 1973
1973/74	St. Patrick's College, Maynooth	2-10	University College Dublin (UCD)	1-07	Ballycastle, County Antrim	3 March 1974
1974/75	University College Dublin (UCD)	4-08	St. Patrick's College, Maynooth	2-07	Croke Park, Dublin	2 March 1975
1975/76	University College Cork (UCC)	3-05	St. Patrick's College, Maynooth	0-10	The Mardyke, Cork	22 February 1976
1976/77	University College Galway (UCG)	1-14	St. Patrick's College, Maynooth	1-12	St Mary's Park, Leixlip, County Kildare	6 March 1977
1977/78	University College Dublin (UCD)	3-15	University College Cork (UCC)	2-07	Corrigan Park, Belfast	March, 1978
1978/79	University College Dublin (UCD)	4-21	St. Patrick's College, Maynooth	1-08	Croke Park, Dublin	25 March 1979
1979/80	University College Galway (UCG)	0-10	University College Cork (UCC)	1-05	Pearse Stadium, Galway	2 March 1980
1980/81	University College Cork (UCC)	2-09	University College Dublin (UCD)	0-08	Croke Park, Dublin	1 March 1981
1981/82	University College Cork (UCC)	0-14	University College Galway (UCG)	3-03	Páirc Uí Chaoimh, Cork	21 February 1982
1982/83	University College Cork (UCC)	3-12	University College Galway (UCG)	1-03	Bellaghy, County Londonderry	27 February 1983
1983/84	University College Cork (UCC)	0-07	University College Dublin (UCD)	0-05	St Patrick's College, Maynooth	19 February 1984
1984/85	University College Cork (UCC)	1-15	University College Galway (UCG)	1-07	Malone, Belfast	3 March 1985
1985/86	University College Cork (UCC)	3-10	Queen's University Belfast	0-12	Croke Park, Dublin	2 March 1986
1986/87	University College Cork (UCC)	1-11	University College Dublin (UCD)	0-11	Castlegar, County Galway	22 February 1987
1987/88	University College Cork (UCC)	1-14	University College Galway (UCG)	1-03	Corrigan Park, Belfast	28 February 1988
1988/89	**N.I.H.E. Limerick** (University of Limerick)	2-09	University College Dublin (UCD)	1-09	Belfield, Dublin	26 February 1989
1989/90	University College Cork (UCC)	3-10	Waterford R.T.C.	0-12	Páirc Uí Chaoimh, Cork	18 March 1990
1990/91	University College Cork (UCC)	1-14	University College Dublin (UCD)	1-06	Corrigan Park, Belfast	10 March 1991
1991/92	**Waterford R.T.C.**	1-19	University of Limerick	1-08	Gaelic Grounds, Limerick	8 March 1992
1992/93	University College Dublin (UCD)	2-21	University College Cork (UCC)	4-14 (AET)	Walsh Park, Waterford	14 March 1993
1993/94	University of Limerick	2-12	Waterford R.T.C.	1-11 (AET)	Clarinbridge, County Galway	13 March 1994
1994/95	Waterford R.T.C.	3-15	University College Dublin (UCD)	1-04	Clane, County Kildare	5 March 1995
1995/96	University College Cork (UCC)	3-16	University of Limerick	0-16	Belfield, Dublin	10 March 1996
1996/97	University College Cork (UCC)	0-14	Garda College	1-08	Páirc Uí Rinn, Cork	2 March 1997
1997/98	University College Cork (UCC)	2-17	Waterford IT (Waterford IT)	0-13	Gaelic Grounds, Limerick	1 March 1998
1998/99	Waterford IT (Waterford IT)	4-15	University College Cork (UCC)	3-12	JK Brackens, Templemore, County Tipperary	28 February 1999
1999/00	Waterford IT (Waterford IT)	2-10	University College Dublin (UCD)	1-06	Walsh Park, Waterford	5 March 2000
2000/01	University College Dublin (UCD)	0-15	University College Cork (UCC)	0-15 (AET)	Parnell Park, Dublin	6 April 2001
	University College Dublin (UCD)	2-10	University College Cork (UCC)	1-09 (Replay)	Nenagh, County Tipperary	18 April 2001
2001/02	University of Limerick	2-14	Waterford IT (Waterford IT)	2-11	Castlegar, County Galway	3 March 2002
2002/03	Waterford IT	0-13	Cork Institute of Technology (CIT)	1-07	The Ragg, Thurles	1 March 2003
2003/04	Waterford IT	0-11	University College Cork (UCC)	0-09	AIT, Athlone	6 March 2004
2004/05	**Limerick Institute of Technology**	2-13	University of Limerick	3-04	Gaelic Grounds, Limerick	5 March 2005
2005/06	Waterford IT (Waterford IT)	4-13	University College Dublin (UCD)	0-08	Páirc Uí Rinn, Cork	6 March 2006
2006/07	Limerick Institute of Technology	2-15	National University of Ireland, Galway (NUIG)	0-13	Dr. Cullen Park, Carlow	10 March 2007
2007/08	Waterford IT (Waterford IT)	1-29	Limerick Institute of Technology	1-24 (AET)	CIT, Bishopstown, Cork	1 March 2008
2008/09	University College Cork (UCC)	2-17	University of Limerick	0-14	Parnell Park, Dublin	7 March 2009
2009/10	National University of Ireland, Galway (NUIG)	1-17	Waterford IT (Waterford IT)	1-16 (AET)	Pearse Stadium, Galway	6 March 2010
2010/11	University of Limerick	1-17	Limerick Institute of Technology	2-11	WIT Sports Complex, Waterford	26 February 2011
2011/12	University College Cork (UCC)	2-15	Cork Institute of Technology (CIT)	2-14 (AET)	The Mardyke, Cork	3 March 2012
2012/13	University College Cork (UCC)	2-17	Mary Immaculate College, Limerick	2-12	Pearse Stadium, Galway	2 March 2013
2013/14	Waterford Institute of Technology	0-17	Cork Institute of Technology	0-12	The Dub, QUB, Belfast	1 March 2014
2014/15	University of Limerick	0-21	Waterford Institute of Technology	3-12 (AET)	Gaelic Grounds, Limerick	28 February 2015
	University of Limerick	2-18	Waterford Institute of Technology	1-14 (Replay)	Páirc Uí Rinn, Cork	11 March 2015
2015/16	**Mary Immaculate College, Limerick**	1-30	University of Limerick	3-22 (AET)	CIT, Bishopstown, Cork	27 February 2016
2016/17	Mary Immaculate College, Limerick	3-24	Institute of Technology, Carlow	1-19	Pearse Stadium, Galway	25 February 2017
2017/18	University of Limerick	2–21	DCU Dóchas Éireann	2–15	Mallow, Cork	24 February 2018
2018/19	University College Cork (UCC)	2-21	Mary Immaculate College, Limerick	0-13	Waterford IT Sports Campus	23 February 2019
2019/20	University College Cork (UCC)	0-18	Institute of Technology, Carlow	2-11	Dublin University Sports Grounds	12 February 2020
2020/21	No competition due to COVID-19 restrictions					
2021/22	University of Limerick	1-21	National University of Ireland, Galway (NUIG)	2-15	IT Carlow Sportsground	19 February 2022
2022/23	University of Limerick	4-19	National University of Ireland, Galway (NUIG)	1-13	SETU Waterford Complex	18 February 2023
2023/24	Mary Immaculate College, Limerick	2-14	University of Limerick	1-15	Abbeydorney GAA Club, Co Kerry	17 February 2024
2024/25	University of Limerick	0-23	DCU Dóchas Éireann	1-15	Connaught Centre of Excellence, Co Mayo	15 February 2025
2025/26	University of Limerick	4-31	Mary Immaculate College, Limerick	3-21	Croke Park	13 February 2026
