= List of towns and villages in County Waterford =

List of towns and villages in a county of Ireland

This is a list of towns and villages in County Waterford, Ireland.

== A ==
- Affane
- Aglish
- Annestown
- Ardmore

== B ==
- Ballinamult
- Ballinroad
- Ballylaneen
- Ballymacarbry
- Bunmahon

== C ==
- Cappoquin
- Carrickbeg
- Cheekpoint
- Clashmore
- Clonea

== D ==
- Dungarvan
- Dunhill
- Dunmore East

== F ==
- Fenor

== G ==
- Grange

== K ==
- Kill
- Kilmacthomas
- Kilmanahan
- Kilmeaden
- Kilrossanty
- Kinsalebeg
- Knockanore

== L ==
- Lemybrien
- Lismore

== M ==
- Mahon Bridge
- Mothel
- Mountmellaray

== O ==
- Old Parish

== P ==
- Passage East
- Portlaw

== R ==
- Rathgormack

== S ==
- Stradbally

== T ==
- Tallow
- Tooraneena
- Tramore

== V ==
- Villierstown

== W ==
- Waterford
