= R677 road (Ireland) =

Road in Ireland

R677 road
- Bóthar R677
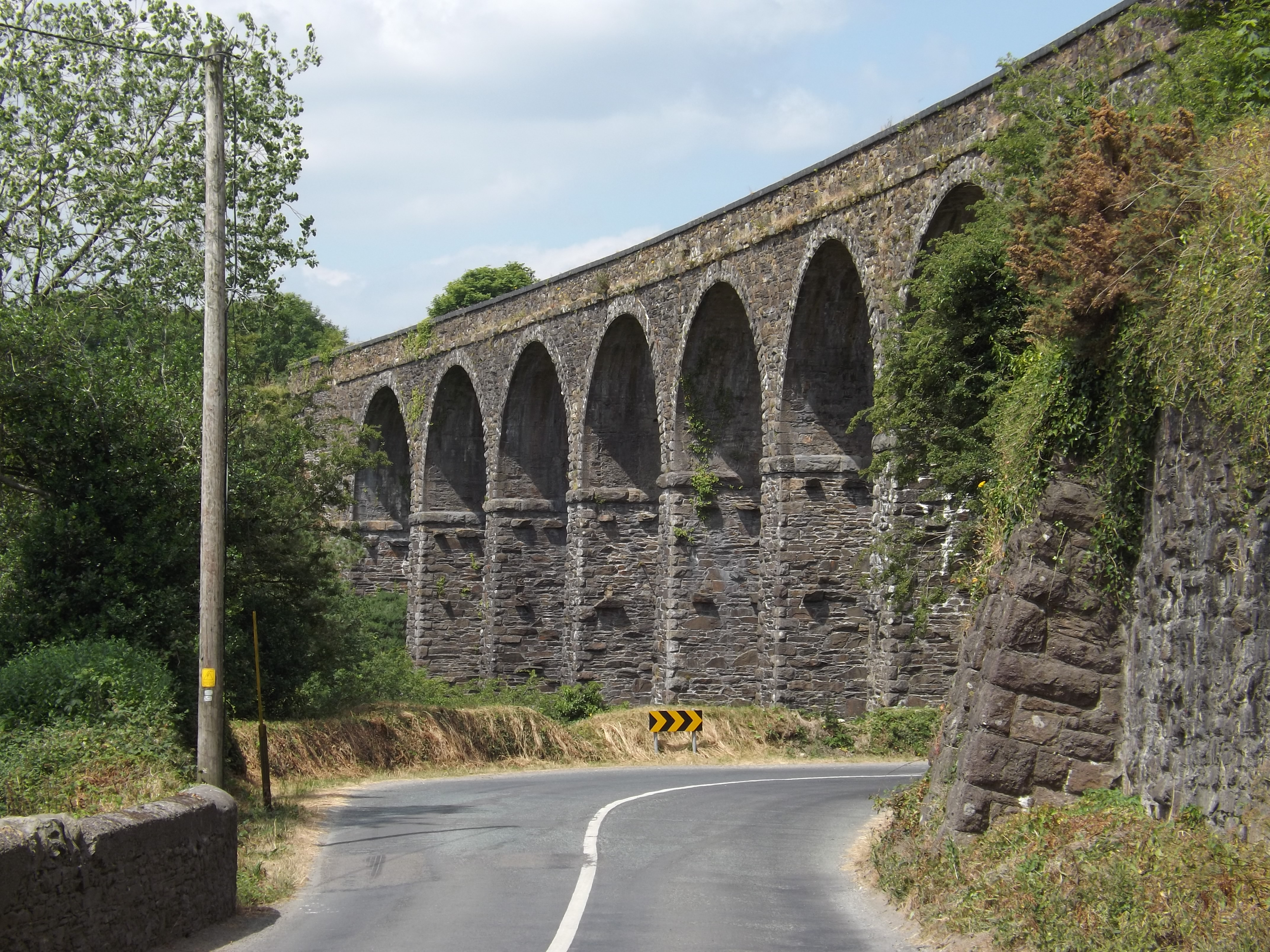
- R677 passing under Kilmacthomas Viaduct

Route information
- Length: 24.2 km (15.0 mi)

Major junctions
- From: R676 at Carrickbeg, County Waterford

- Cross River Clodiagh at Oldgrange; R678 at Lowrys Bridge; R679 at Tech Road, Kilmacthomas; Cross River Mahon at Kilmacthomas

- To: R675 at Seafield

Location
- Country: Ireland

Highway system
- Roads in Ireland; Motorways; Primary; Secondary; Regional
← R676	→ R678

The R677 road is a regional road in County Waterford, Ireland. It travels from the R676 road to the R675, via the villages of Kilmacthomas and Ballylaneen. The road is 24.2 kilometres (15.0 mi) long.
