= R678 road (Ireland) =

Road in Ireland

Coordinates: 52.291992°N 7.465606°W

R678 road
- Bóthar R678
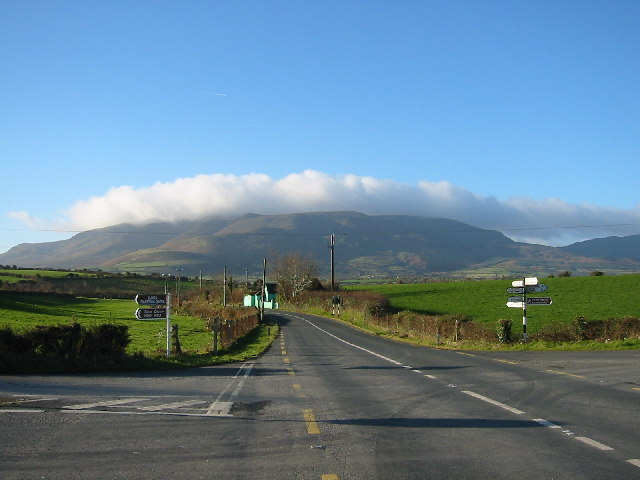
- Ballyhest Crossroads, where the R678 and R676 meet.

Route information
- Length: 30.9 km (19.2 mi)

Major junctions
- From: R680 R671 Carrick-on-Suir (Raheen Road)
- Enters County Cork; Passes through Rathgormack; R676 Ballyhest; Crosses River Clodiagh
- To: R677 Lowry's Bridge

Location
- Country: Ireland

Highway system
- Roads in Ireland; Motorways; Primary; Secondary; Regional

The R678 road is a regional road in Ireland, located in County Tipperary and County Waterford.
