= Flahavan =

Flahavan is a surname. Notable people with the surname include:

- Aaron Flahavan (1975–2001), English footballer
- Darryl Flahavan (born 1978), English footballer and coach

== See also ==
- Flahavan's, family-owned oat milling company based in Southeast Ireland
