= Kilrossanty =

Village in County Waterford, Ireland

Kilrossanty Cill Rosanta
- Village
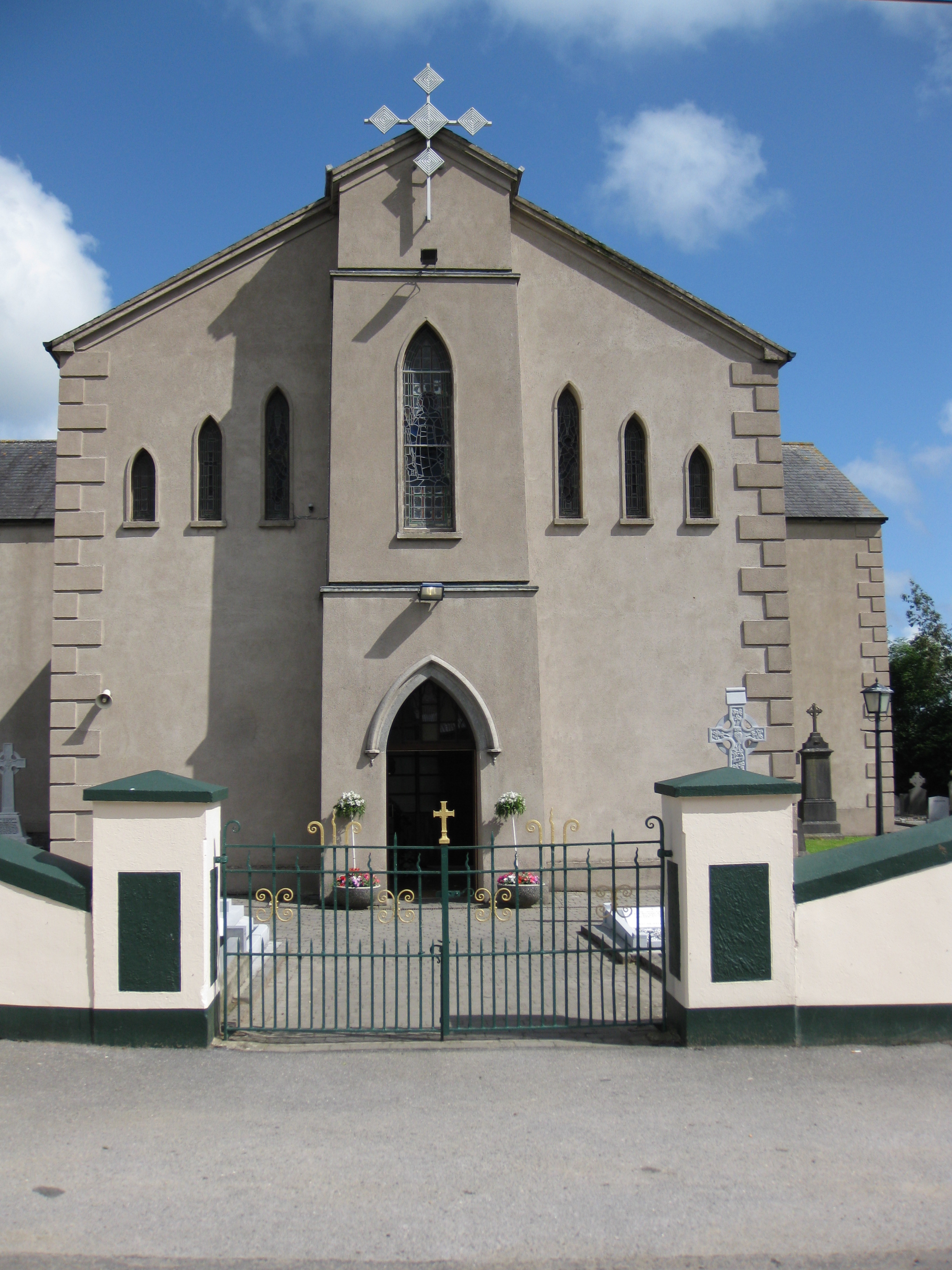
- St Brigid's Church

- Location in Ireland
- Coordinates: 52°10′38″N 7°32′46″W
- Country: Ireland
- Province: Munster
- County: Waterford
- Time zone: UTC+0 (WET)
  - Summer (DST): UTC-1 (IST (WEST))

Kilrossanty (Irish: Cill Rosanta) is a small village and civil parish in County Waterford, Ireland. It lies between the Comeragh Mountains and the R676 road between Dungarvan and Carrick-on-Suir, close to the Mahon Falls. It is 11 km (7 mi) north of Dungarvan, and 32 km (20 mi) west of Waterford city. Kilrossanty is in a townland of the same name.

== Amenities ==
Local leisure facilities include Kilrossanty GAA sports club, a pub in the village, and hillwalking in the Comeragh mountains.

== Religion ==
Beside the ruins of the old village church are three holy wells, the main one dedicated to St. Brigid.

== Buildings ==
Comeragh House, a landed mansion outside the village, was the home of 19th-century explorer John Palliser, and between 1964 and 1979 was lived in by Dutch art collector Pieter Menten, until he was arrested in the Netherlands and convicted of being a World War 2 war criminal. On his release from prison in 1985, he planned to return to Comeragh House, but was banned by the government from entering Ireland. The house was sold two years later following Menten's death.

== See also ==
- List of towns and villages in Ireland
