= R679 road (Ireland) =

Road in Ireland

Coordinates: 52.202212°N 7.417760°W

R679 road
- Bóthar R679

Route information
- Length: 0.7 km (0.43 mi; 2,300 ft)

Major junctions
- From: R677 Kilmacthomas
- To: N25 Percy Kirwan Bridge

Location
- Country: Ireland

Highway system
- Roads in Ireland; Motorways; Primary; Secondary; Regional

The R679 road is a regional road in Ireland, located in County Waterford.
