= Mahon Bridge =

Village in County Waterford, Ireland

Mahon Bridge Droichead na Machan
- Village
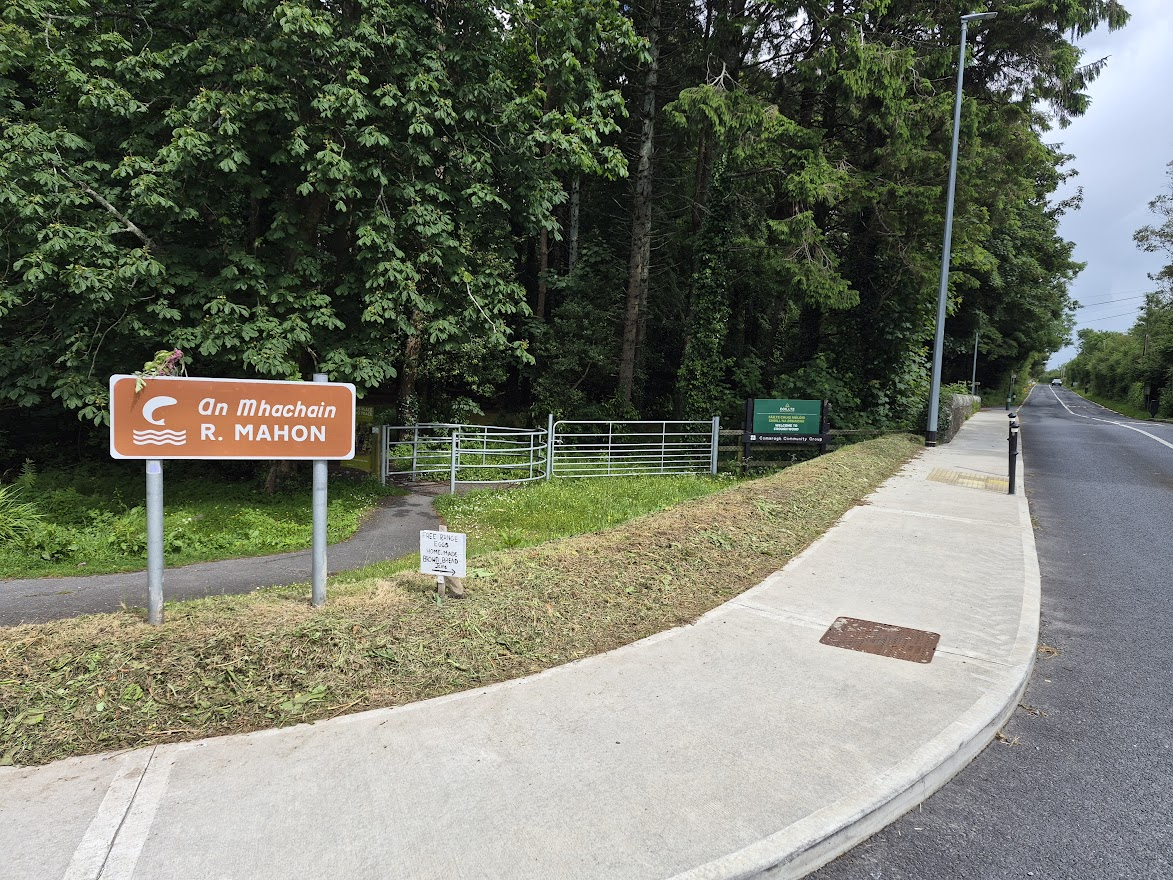
- Entrance to Crough Wood Walk at Mahon Bridge, with the bridge over the River Mahon

- Location in Ireland
- Coordinates: 52°12′18″N 7°30′00″W
- Country: Ireland
- Province: Munster
- County: Waterford
- Time zone: UTC+0 (WET)
  - Summer (DST): UTC-1 (IST (WEST))

Mahon Bridge (Irish: Droichead na Machan), also spelled Mahonbridge, is a village in the parish of Kilrossanty in mid County Waterford, Ireland. It is on the R676 road between Carrick on Suir and Dungarvan, and the nearest town is Kilmacthomas, approximately 6 km to the east.

== Toponymy ==
Mahon Bridge is named for the road bridge which crosses the River Mahon at this point, the river running from the Mahon Falls in the Comeragh Mountains to the sea at Bunmahon.

== Amenities and tourism ==
The village is laid-out around a triangular field which was developed in 2024 into a local amenity area. In the centre of the village is a coffee shop located in a former grocery shop.

Mahon Bridge is used by walkers as a starting point for visits to Mahon Falls and the Comeragh Mountains. A walking trail, Crough Wood Walk, starts at Mahon Bridge and runs alongside the River Mahon through forest and open areas towards Mahon Falls for approximately 2.7km.

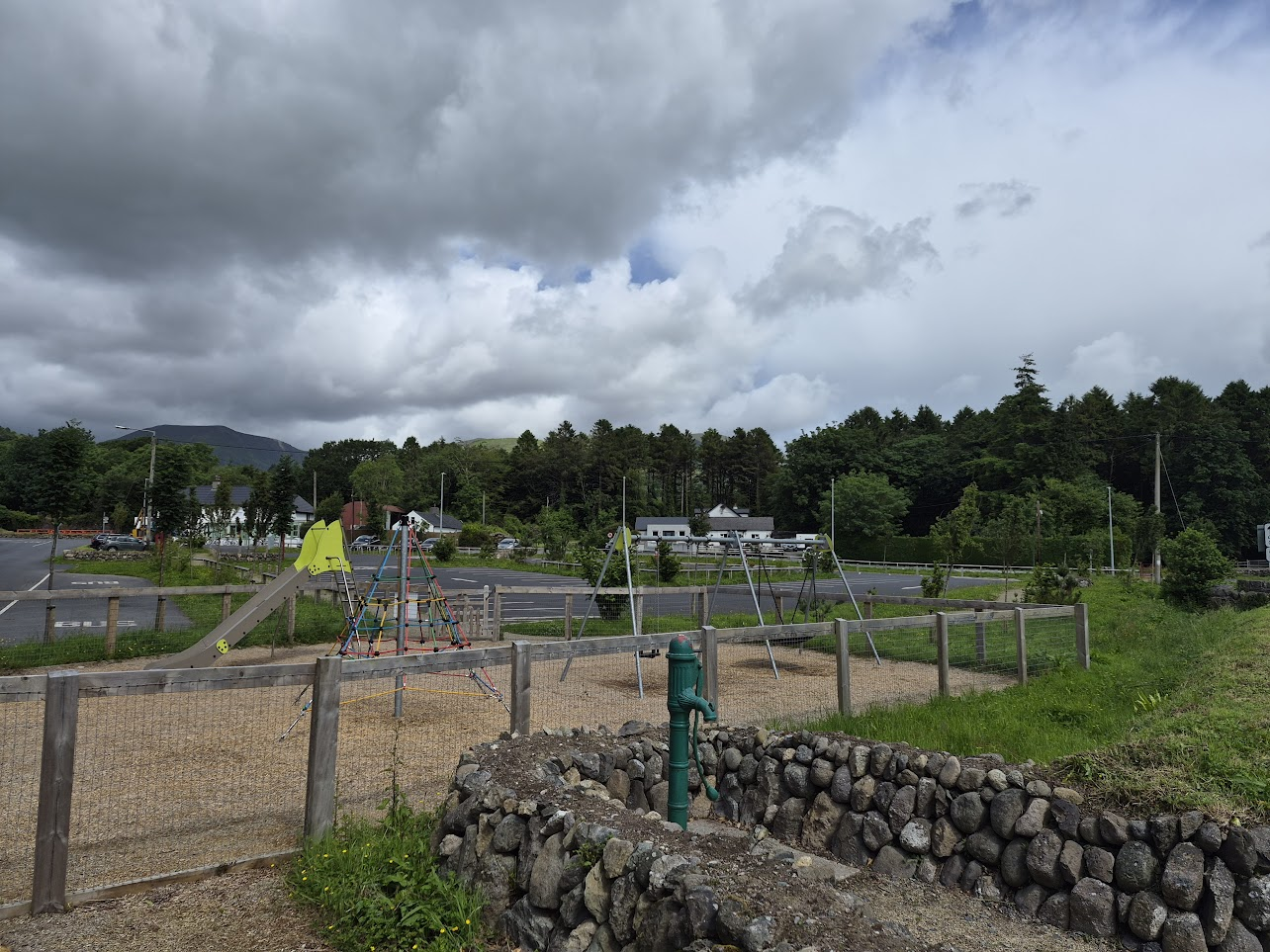
Playground in Mahon Bridge, with carpark and café in the background

The amenity area includes a small children's playground and a car park with 106 spaces. There is also seating, bike parking, EV charging and biodiversity planting and wetlands. At the northern, upper end of the walk, the walkway emerges onto the public road where hikers can continue to Mahon Falls.

== Built heritage ==
The stone bridge at Mahon Bridge, in Kilcomeragh townland, was built c. 1780. Other archaeological sites in the townland, close to the village, include a castle, described as "a large slate house with a bawn", which was reputedly burnt by a party of Royalists under Charles Vavasour around the time of the Irish Rebellion of 1641. The site of the former castle, now in a private garden, has no remains visible above ground-level.

An ogham stone, originally from the Knockalafalla-Rathgormuck area is now in the garden of Comeragh Lodge. Other sites in Kilcomeragh include a children's burial ground and a possible souterrain site.

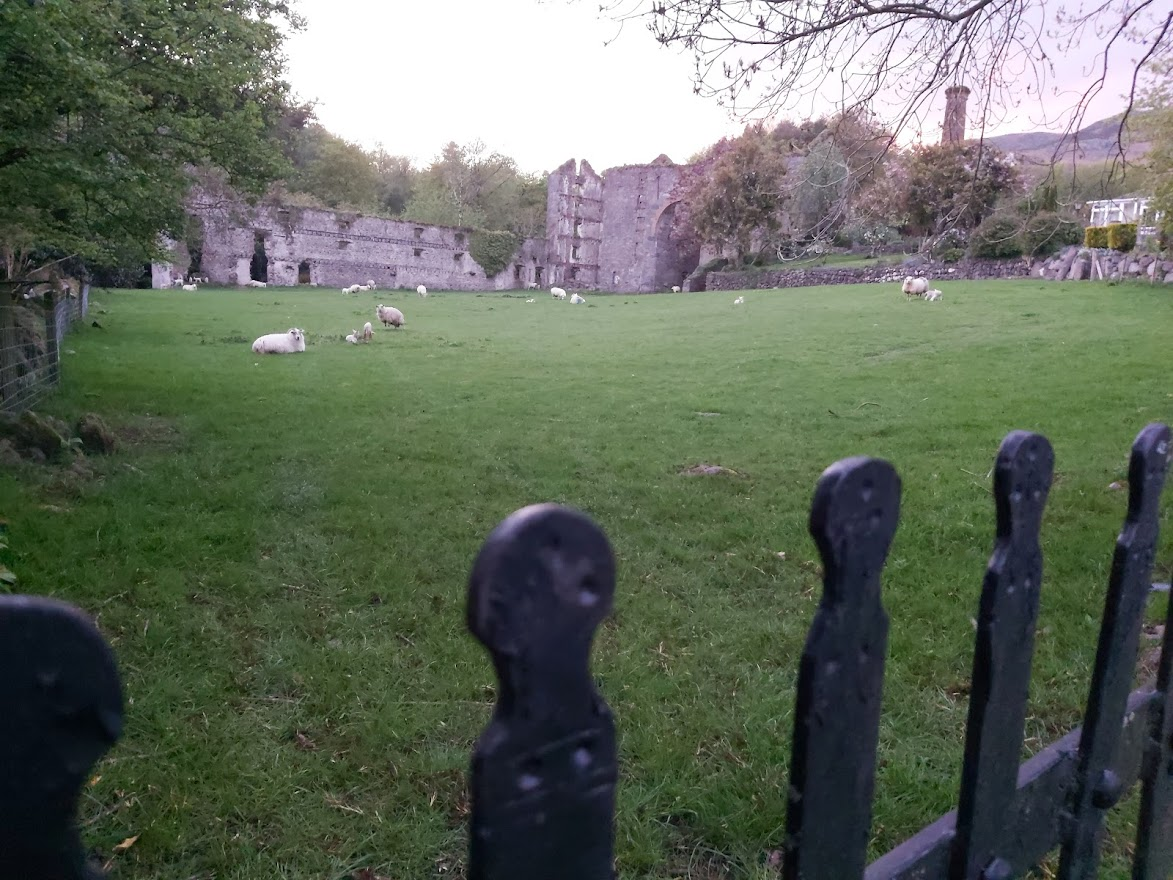
Palliser's Mill, in Mahon Bridge

Nearby Comeragh House (built c. 1825 and originally called Roxboro) was the home of the Palliser family. The family, descended from William Palliser (1644–1726) Archbishop of Cashel, included Frederick Wray Palliser who married Anne Gledstane in 1814. Their descendants include explorer John Palliser (1817–1887) and William Palliser (1830–1882) inventor of the Palliser Shot. Grace Penelope Palliser married William Fairholme and the estate stayed within the family. Comeragh House was burned in February 1923, one of several large houses destroyed during the Irish Civil War, and many of the family's records were lost. The Palliser family also built a 19th-century mill nearby, now ruined.

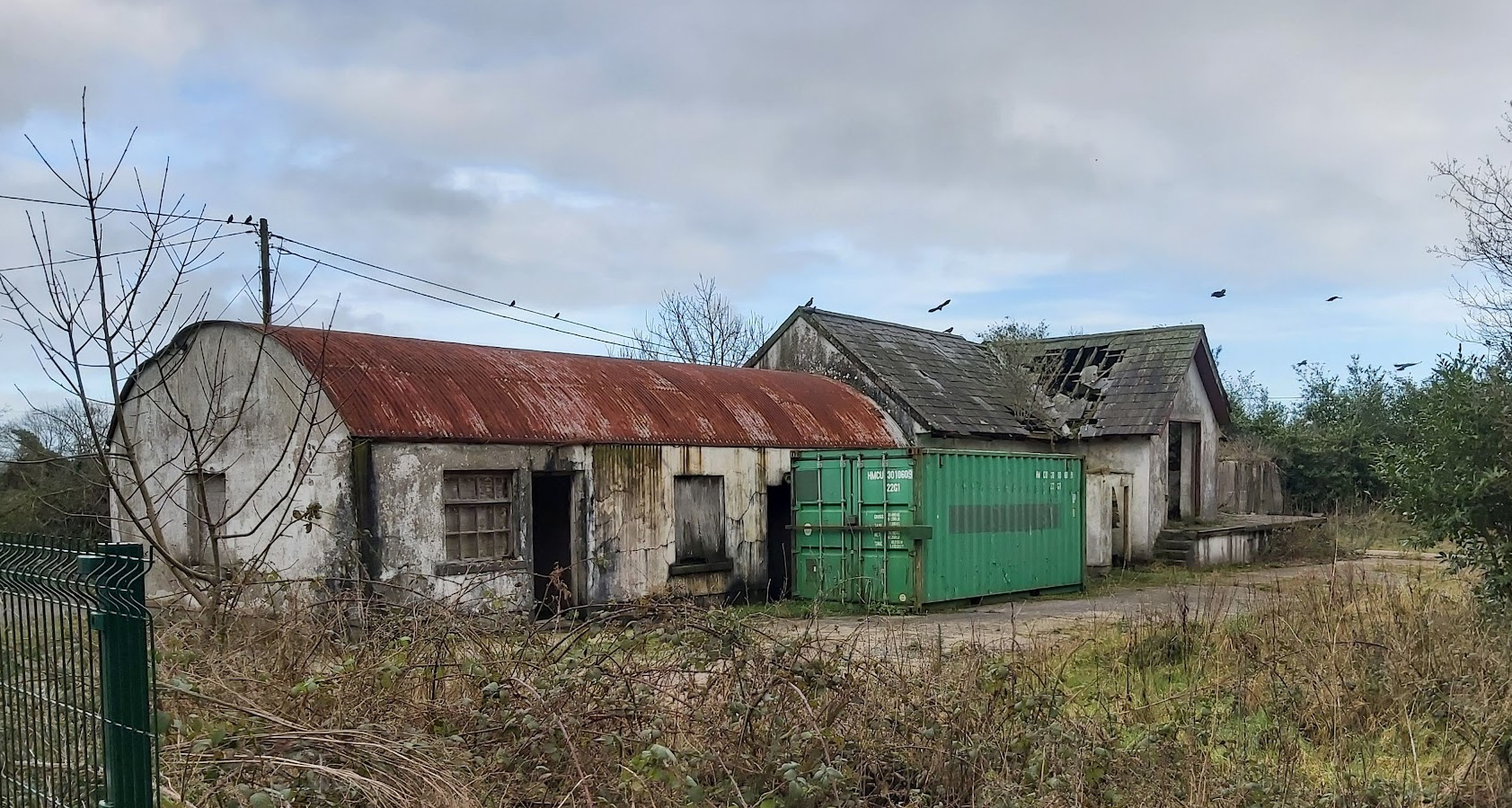
The Church of Ireland School, later used as a creamery, now disused and in ruins.

The Church of Ireland school in Mahon Bridge closed c1908 and in 1920 the building was given to Mahon Valley Creamery by the Fairholme family. It remained in use as a creamery as part of Waterford Coop until the 1980s.

There was a forge at Mahon Bridge / Kilclooney. Ironwork from a forge in the area was linked to the inventions of William Palliser.

There is a small privately owned run-of-the-river hydroelectric power station slightly upriver from Mahon Bridge. The station is fed from the River Mahon about 2 km upstream of the village. It generates a maximum of 850 kW of electricity to add to the national grid.

== See also ==
- List of towns and villages in Ireland
