= R676 road (Ireland) =

Road in Ireland

R676 road
- Bóthar R676
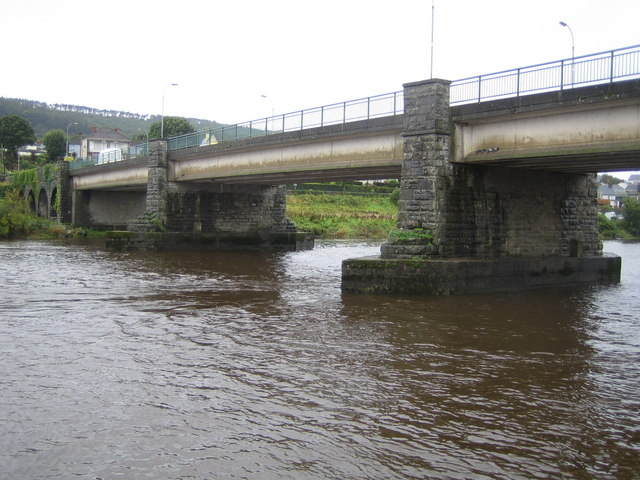
- Dillon Bridge carries the R676 over the River Suir in Carrick-on-Suir

Route information
- Length: 23.9 km (14.9 mi)

Major junctions
- From: N25 at Lemybrien, County Waterford
- Cross River Clodiagh at Kilclooney Bridge; R678 at Ballyhest; R677 at Carrickbeg; Enter County Tipperary; R680 at Carrickbeg; Cross River Suir at Dillon Bridge, Carrick-on-Suir; R885 at Main Street, Carrick-on-Suir
- To: N24 at Carrick-on-Suir

Location
- Country: Ireland

Highway system
- Roads in Ireland; Motorways; Primary; Secondary; Regional
← R675	→ R677

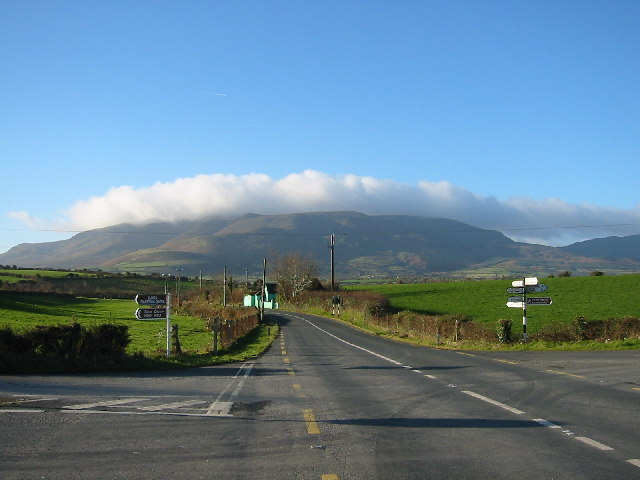
R676 at junction with R678 in Ballyhest

The R676 road is a regional road in Ireland. It connects the N25 road in County Waterford to the N24 at Carrick-on-Suir, County Tipperary, via the villages of Mahon Bridge and Carrickbeg. The road is 23.9 kilometres (14.9 mi) long.
