= Clonea =

Clonea may refer to several things in County Waterford, Ireland:

- Clonea, a civil parish in County Waterford
- Clonea Beach, near Dungarvan in County Waterford
- Clonea Castle, an 18th or 19th century structure near Clonea Beach in County Waterford
- Clonea Power, a village near Rathgormack in County Waterford

== See also ==
- Clonea Power–Rathgormack GAA
