= Tadhg Gaelach Ó Súilleabháin =

Irish poet (c. 1715 – 1795)

Tadhg Gaelach Ó Súilleabháin (c. 1715 – 1795), known in English as Timothy O'Sullivan, was a composer of mostly Christian poetry in the Irish language whose Pious Miscellany was reprinted over 40 times in the early 19th century.

== Early life and works ==
Ó Súilleabháin was born in Míntín Eoghain in the civil parish of Killeedy near Tournafulla, in the Sliabh Luachra region of County Limerick c.1715. His early works were reflective of Munster Irish bardic poetry of the period, including laments, eulogies, "drinking songs" and Aisling-themed war poetry promoting the Jacobite risings. Ó Súilleabháin lived in County Cork for a period and was friendly with fellow Jacobite poet Seán "Clárach" Mac Domhnaill. After moving to Dungarvan, County Waterford during the 1760s, he experienced a religious conversion and thereafter primarily composed Christian poetry in Munster Irish upon themes such as the Holy Trinity, the Virgin Mary, chastity, the rosary, and St Declán of Ardmore.

Up to the time of his death, Tadhg Gaelach was sometimes looked after by the O'Callaghans; a relatively prosperous Ballylaneen Catholic farming family. He was also a frequent guest of the village Roman Catholic priest, Fr. Richard Morrissey. Other local friends and patrons included the O'Phelan (Ó Faoláin) family, and one of his last songs is written in their honour Do Seoirse agus Domhnall Ó Faoiláin to be sung to the air, "Bonny Jane".

== Death and legacy ==
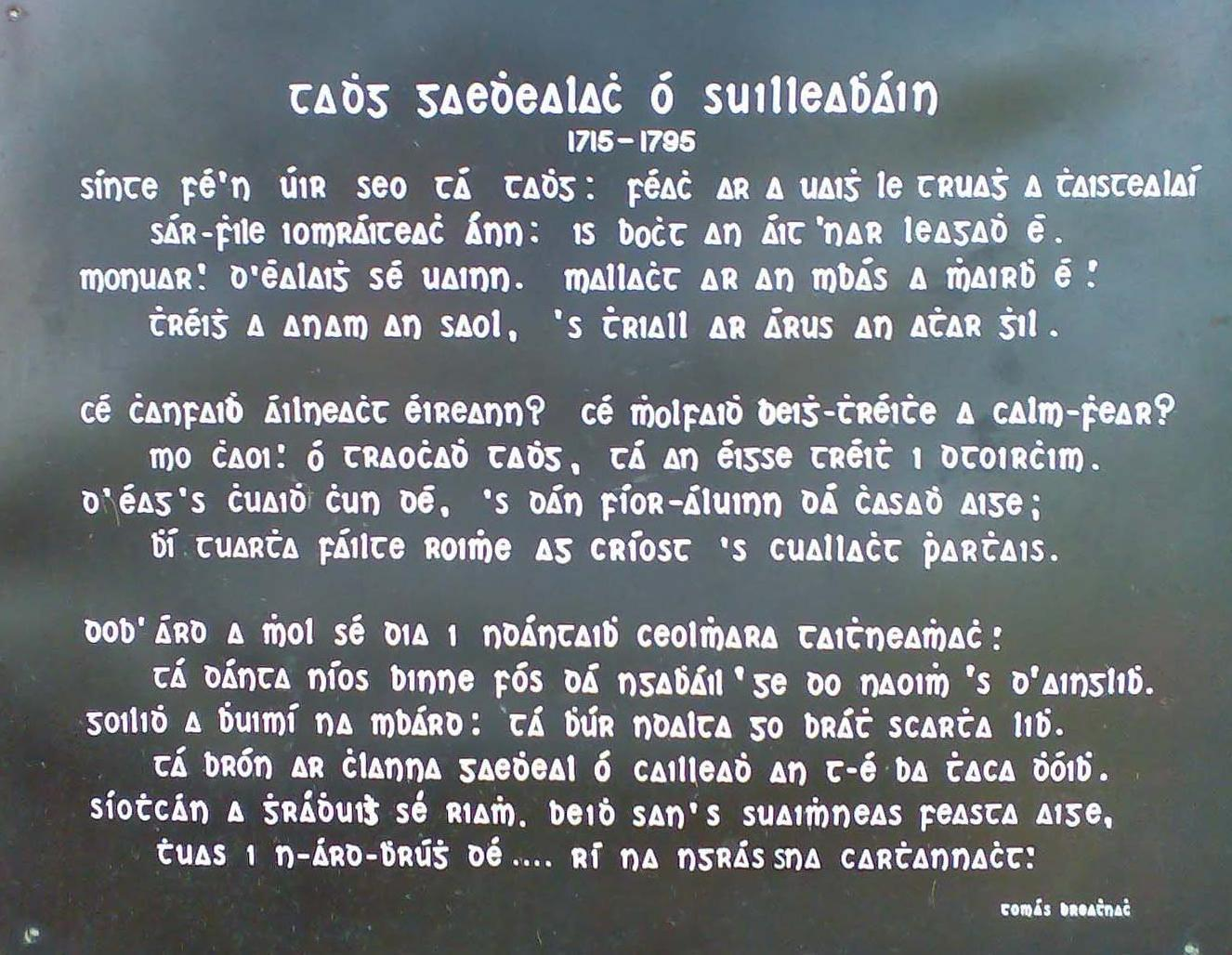
Eulogy for Tadhg Gaelach Ó Súilleabháin, composed by Donnchadh Ruadh Mac Conmara in Neo-Latin. Translated into Munster Irish by village schoolmaster Tom Walsh c.1910. Ballylaneen Cemetery, County Waterford.

Tadhg Gaelach Ó Súilleabháin is said to have collapsed and died while praying inside St. Patrick's Church in Waterford in April 1795, and lies buried in Ballylaneen. Upon hearing of the death of his close friend and fellow poet, Donnchadh Ruadh Mac Conmara composed a eulogy for Ó Súilleabháin in Neo-Latin verse.

While manuscripts of Ó Súilleabháin's Christian poetry had already circulated before his death, and in 1802 a printed collection of twenty-five religious poems was published at Clonmel under the title Timothy O'Sullivan's Irish Pious Miscellany. Between 1816 and 1879 more than a dozen new editions of the Pious Miscellany were printed and sold in Clonmel, Cork City, Limerick, and Dublin, which leaves little doubt that it was the most widely read Irish-language book ever published before the later Gaelic revival. A collection of Tadhg Gaelach's hymns were published by an tAthair Pádraig Ua Duinnín in Dublin in 1903.
