= Aglish =

Village in County Waterford, Ireland

Aglish An Eaglais
- Village
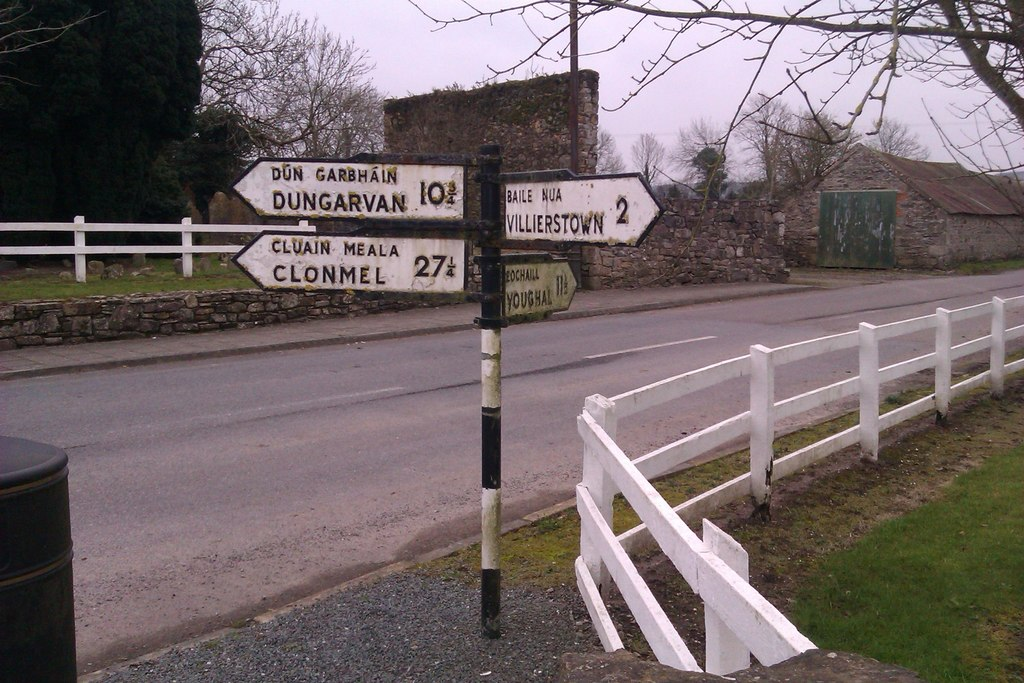
- Road signs in Aglish

- Location in Ireland
- Coordinates: 52°04′12″N 7°49′30″W
- Country: Ireland
- Province: Munster
- County: Waterford

Population (2016)
  - Total: 333
- Time zone: UTC+0 (WET)
  - Summer (DST): UTC-1 (IST (WEST))
- Irish Grid Reference: X121911

Aglish (Irish: An Eaglais, meaning 'the church') is a village in west County Waterford, Ireland. The village is in a townland and civil parish of the same name.

== Population ==
The population of the village almost doubled in size from 169 people as of the 2006 census, to 333 inhabitants by the 2016 census. According to the 2016 census, approximately 50% of the homes in Aglish (72 of 137 responding private households) were built between 2001 and 2010.

== Location and access ==
Aglish lies 16 km (10 mi) west of Dungarvan and 18 km (11 mi) north of Youghal, and is within the parish of Aglish, Ballinameela and Mount Stuart. Running through the village is the Geosh river, a tributary of the River Blackwater.

Aglish is located alongside the R671 regional road that runs from Clonmel due south to Piltown Cross, near Youghal.

== Religion ==
The village is home to a 19th-century Catholic church - eaglais being the Irish-language word for "church" - with a former ruined church cited by the Dungarvan Leader newspaper to have been "pre-invasion". Remnants of two former ruined churches are still to be found alongside each other in the centre of the village, surrounded by an old graveyard dating back to at least 1700.

== Amenities ==
Local amenities include a national school, village hall, two sports pitches - one connected to the school - and one pub.

An annual vintage rally was run in the area from 1980 to 1996, and was revived again in 2008.

== Landmarks ==
The Kiltera Ogham Stones are located in Dromore between the village of Aglish and the river Blackwater, consisting of two ogham stones forming a National Monument. The ogham stones are located in a field on the east bank of the Blackwater, 1.8 km (1.1 mi) west of the village.

== Sport ==
Geraldines GAA is the local Gaelic Athletic Association club, and fields hurling and Gaelic football teams. Geraldines played in the Waterford Senior Football Championship in the 1960s. The preceding Aglish club won three Waterford senior football titles in 1915, 1922 and 1923.

Founded in 1975, St Olivers GAA Club fields underage teams for the whole parish, and play their home games in Aglish and Ballinameela.

== Paddy O'Brien ==
Paddy O'Brien is a singer from the area, who won Irish country music's Gold Star award in 1988.

== Local media ==
The area is served by the local Dungarvan Leader and Dungarvan Observer newspapers, plus Waterford county radio station WLR FM and Youghal-based community radio station CRY 104.0FM.

A parish newsletter called Parish News served the area in the 1990s.

== See also ==
- List of towns and villages in Ireland
- Aglish, Ballinameela and Mount Stuart
