= R885 road (Ireland) =

Short regional road in Ireland

Coordinates: 52.346206°N 7.413705°W

R885 road
- Bóthar R885
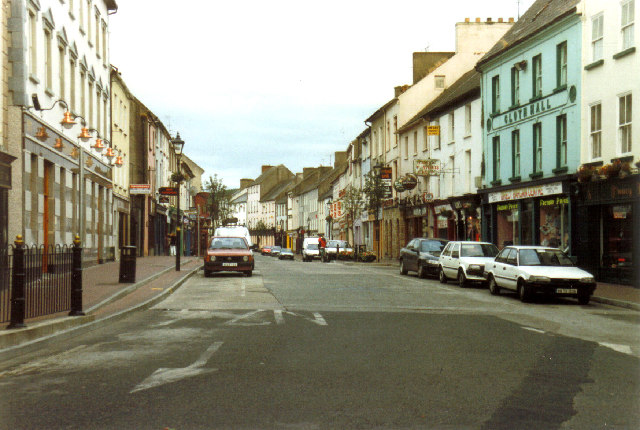
- Carrick-on-Suir main street, which is part of the R885.

Route information
- Length: 0.5 km (0.31 mi; 1,600 ft)

Major junctions
- From: N24 Carrick-on-Suir (O'Mahony Avenue)
- To: R676 Carrick-on-Suir (The Quay)

Location
- Country: Ireland

Highway system
- Roads in Ireland; Motorways; Primary; Secondary; Regional

The R885 road is a very short regional road in Ireland, located in Carrick-on-Suir, County Tipperary.
