= Paddy O'Brien (singer) =

- Born: Patrick Finbar O'Brien; 6 November 1954 (age 71); Aglish, County Waterford, Ireland
- Genres: Country music
- Occupation: Singer
- Formerly of: The Strangers

Paddy O'Brien (born 6 November 1954 in Aglish, County Waterford) is an Irish country music singer.

== Early career ==
He was born Patrick Finbar O'Brien and was the youngest of five children. He was interested in country music at a young age when he was encouraged by his father to sing at local pubs.

O'Brien formed a band in 1972 called The Strangers. But it wasn't until many years later that he gained more national recognition.

== Career ==
O'Brien specializes in yodelling making it his trademarks. He covered Slim Whitman's song "Indian Love Call". His big break came in 1983, when he released his first cassette called Easy Listening. His follow-up release was the 1984 album Mem'ries and a third release Favourites in 1987 with national fame in Ireland and four country number ones in 1990. His most successful album is entitled Golden Moments released in 1993. He toured Nashville in 1989 and he is well known outside Ireland, notably in Australia and New Zealand.

== Personal life ==
When he was 16, O'Brien had an almost fatal motorbike accident. In 1981, he had another serious road accident.

== Discography ==
- 1983: Easy Listening
- 1984: Mem'ries
- 1987: Favourites
- 1993: Golden Moments
