= Kiltera Ogham Stones =

- Clochanna Oghaim Ceall Tíre (Irish)
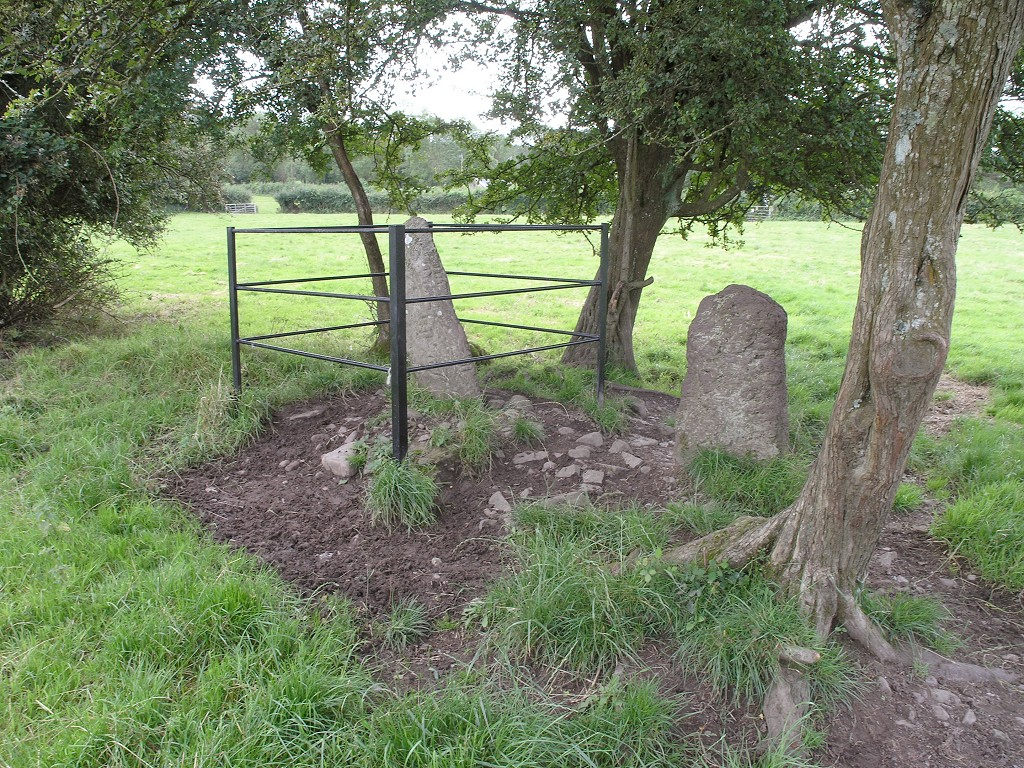

- Location within Ireland
- 52.074351°N 7.847713°W
- Type: Ogham stones
- Location: Dromore, Aglish, County Waterford, Ireland

History
- Built: AD 500–700

Site notes
- Elevation: 60 m (200 ft)
- Height: 1.32 m (4 ft 4 in)

National monument of Ireland
- Official name: Kiltera
- Reference no.: 330

Kiltera Ogham Stones are two ogham stones forming a National Monument located in County Waterford, Ireland.

== Location ==
Kiltera Ogham Stones is located in a field on the east bank of the Munster Blackwater, 1.8 km (1.1 mi) west of Aglish.

== History ==
Kiltera Ogham Stones were carved in the 6th/7th centuries AD.

== Description ==
The larger stone (CIIC 266) dates from c. AD 500–700 and is slate, with quartz veins and measures 132 × 51 × 13 cm. The inscription reads ᚛ᚉᚑᚂᚂᚐᚁᚑᚈ ᚋᚒᚉᚖ ᚂᚒᚌᚐ ᚋᚐᚊᚔ ᚂᚑᚁᚐᚉᚉᚑᚅᚐ᚜ (COLLABOT MUCOI LUGA MAQI LOBACCONA), "Of Cóelub of the tribe of Lug, son of Lubchú."

The smaller stone (CIIC 267) reads ᚛ᚋᚓᚇᚒᚄᚔ ᚋᚒᚉᚖ ᚂᚒᚌᚐ᚜ (MEDUSI MUCOI LUGA), "Medusi of the tribe of Lug." It measures 130 × 41 × 25 cm.

A third stone (CIIC 268), carved c. AD 540–600, later removed to the National Museum, read ᚛ᚉᚐᚈᚈᚒᚃᚔᚏ᚜ (CATTUVIR).
