= Croughaun Hill =

Mountain in County Waterford, Ireland

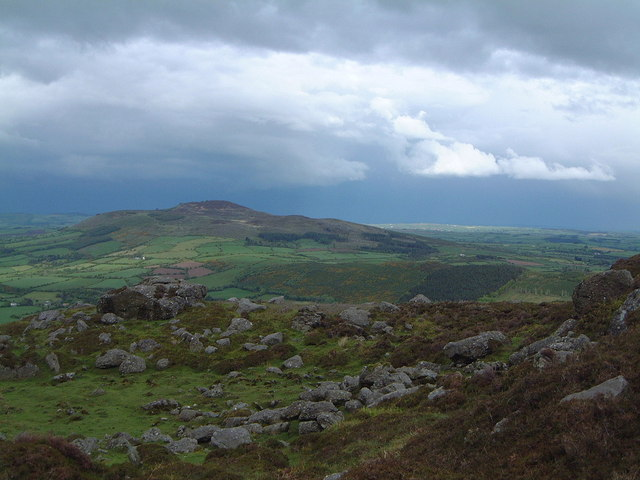

Highest point
- Elevation: 391 m (1,283 ft)
- Prominence: 225 m (738 ft)
- Coordinates: 52°15′02″N 7°26′56″W

Naming
- Native name: Cruachán Paorach (Irish)

Geography
- Location within island of Ireland
- Parent range: Comeragh Mountains
- OSI/OSNI grid: S379110

Croughaun Hill (Irish: Cruachán Paorach or Cruachán) is a hill in north County Waterford, Ireland. It is a largely solitary hill to the east of the Comeragh Mountains.

== Geography ==
The hill has a conical shape, and is geologically composed of conglomerates, sandstone and siltstone which are dated to the Devonian period.

Villages in the surrounding hinterland include Fews, Clonea-Power and Rathgormack.
