= John Palliser =

Irish-born British explorer (1817–1887)

John Palliser CMG
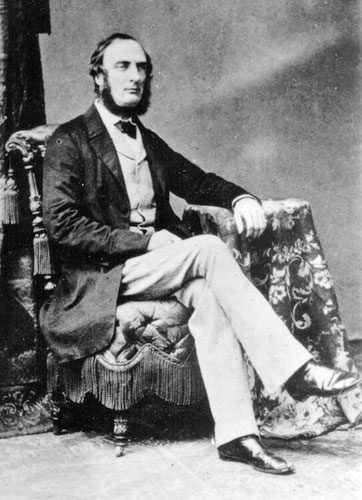
- Born: 29 January 1817; Dublin, Ireland, United Kingdom
- Died: 18 August 1887 (aged 70); Waterford, Ireland, United Kingdom
- Occupation: geographer

John Palliser CMG (29 January 1817 – 18 August 1887) was an Irish-born geographer and explorer. Following his service in the Waterford Militia and hunting excursions to the North American prairies, he led the British North American Exploring Expedition which investigated the geography, climate and ecology of what would later become western Canada.

== Biography ==
Born in Dublin, Ireland, he was the son of Colonel Wray Palliser and a brother of Major Sir William Palliser (1830–1882), all descendants of Dr William Palliser, Archbishop of Cashel (1644–1726).

From 1839 to 1863, Palliser served in the Waterford Militia, eventually with the rank of captain. He was also appointed High Sheriff of County Waterford for 1844–45. During a hunting expedition in British North America in 1847, Palliser wrote Solitary Rambles and Adventures of a Hunter in the Prairies, first published in 1853. He travelled back to British North America as leader of the British North American Exploring Expedition, which travelled over the uncharted regions of the far west between 1857 and 1861. He made a topographical delimitation of the boundary between British North America and the United States, from Lake Superior to the coast of the Pacific Ocean. He was assisted by astronomer Lieutenant Thomas Blakiston of the Royal Artillery, botanist Eugène Bourgeau and geologist Dr James Hector.

While travelling he explored a few rivers:

- White Fish River
- Kaministiquia River
- North Saskatchewan River
- South Saskatchewan River
- Red River

In 1859 Palliser was awarded the Patron's Gold Medal of the Royal Geographical Society for his Survey of the Rocky Mountains. He returned to Ireland in 1862 and presented his findings to the British Parliament.

The information contained in his survey was instrumental in ending the Hudson's Bay Company's ownership of Rupert's Land (lands encompassing all tributaries to Hudson Bay) with the Deed of Surrender, which came into effect in 1870. While Palliser is credited with opening up a new era of settlement and development in the Canadian West, his warnings about the unsuitability to agricultural development of the area now known as Palliser's Triangle went unheeded. Palliser reported that the region including what is now southeastern Alberta and southwestern Saskatchewan, was too arid for farming. The area was nevertheless settled for farming, but was devastated in the Dust Bowl drought.

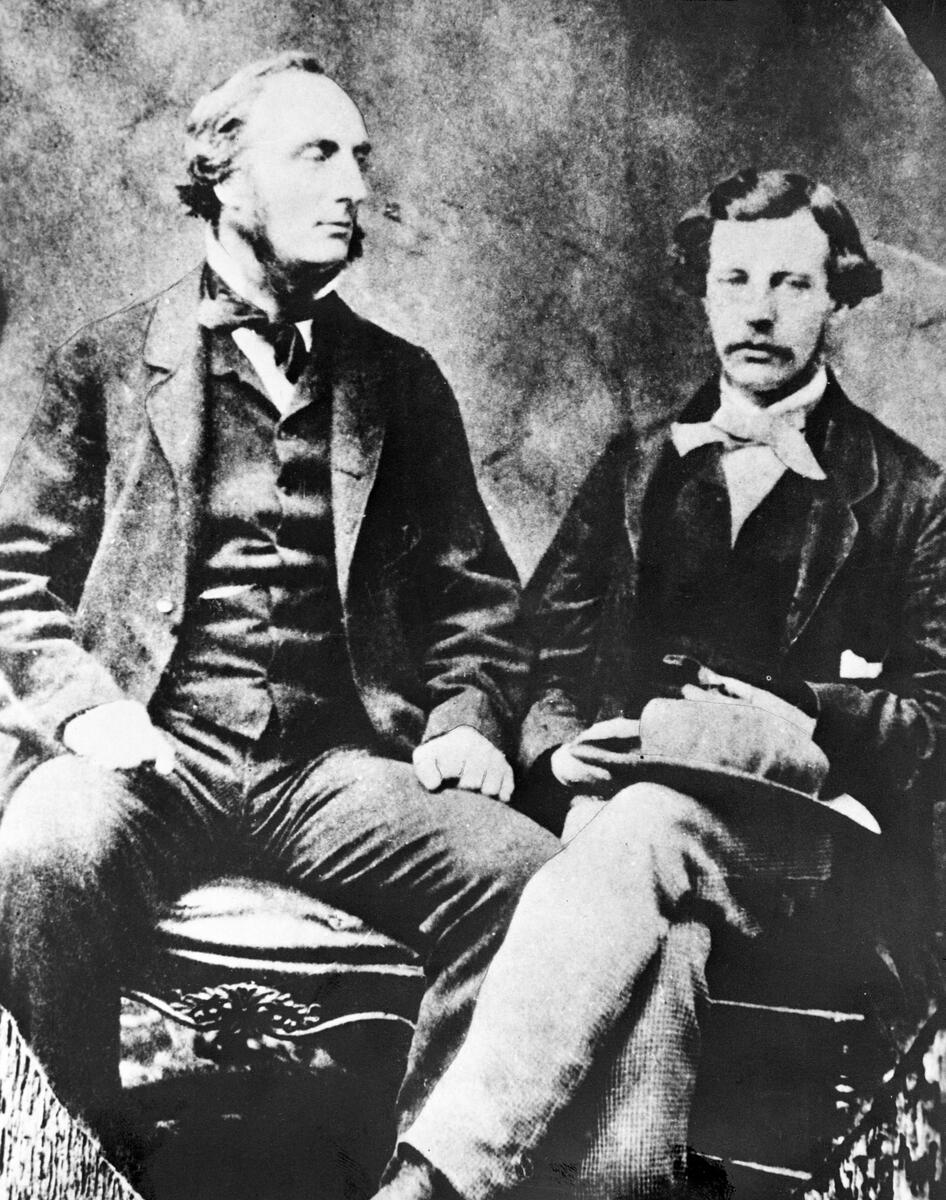
Captain John Palliser (left) and James Hector.

In 1869 he travelled to Novaya Zemlya in Russia with another brother, Frederick Palliser, aboard the ship Sampson.

Palliser was named a Companion of the Order of St. Michael and St. George (CMG) in the 1877 Birthday Honours. He never married and retired to Ireland, where he spent the rest of his life caring for his family. He died at his house, Comeragh House, Mahon Bridge, in County Waterford, Ireland in 1887. He is buried in the graveyard of Comeragh Church, Briska, near Kilmacthomas in County Waterford. The Alberta administration has placed a plaque on his grave in commemoration of his achievements.

The Fairmont Palliser Hotel and the neighbourhood of Palliser in Calgary, Alberta, are named after him, as are the Palliser Range, Palliser Regional School Division and Palliser Formation of the Canadian Rockies. The University of Calgary undergraduate Geography club is named the Palliser Club. The railway station named Palliser located at mile 22.4 on CPKC Mountain subdivision is named after Captain Palliser.

== Publications ==
- Solitary rambles and adventures of a hunter in the prairies (1853)
- Papers relative to the exploration by Captain Palliser of that portion of British North America which lies between the northern branch of the River Saskatchewan and the frontier of the United States; and between the Red River and Rocky Mountains (1859)
- The solitary hunter, or, Sporting adventures in the prairies (1860)
- Further papers relative to the exploration by the expedition under Captain Palliser of that portion of British North America which lies between the northern branch of the River Saskatchewan and the frontier of the United States; and between the Red River and the Rocky Mountains, and thence to the Pacific Ocean (1860)
- Exploration - British North America: The journals, detailed reports, and observations relative to the exploration, by Captain Palliser, of that portion of British North America, which, in latitude, lies between the British boundary line and the height of land or watershed of the northern or frozen ocean respectively, and in longitude, between the western shore of Lake Superior and the Pacific Ocean during the years 1857, 1858, 1859, and 1860 (1863)

== See also ==
- James McKay
