= Aglish, Ballinameela and Mount Stuart =

Catholic parish in County Waterford, Ireland

Aglish, Ballinammela and Mount Stuart
- Parish
- Location in Ireland
- Coordinates: 52°04′12″N 7°49′30″W
- Country: Ireland
- Province: Munster
- County: Waterford
- Time zone: UTC+0 (WET)
  - Summer (DST): UTC-1 (IST (WEST))
- Irish Grid Reference: X121911

Aglish, Ballinameela and Mount Stuart is a large parish in the Roman Catholic Diocese of Waterford and Lismore. It is situated west of Dungarvan in County Waterford, Ireland. The parish comprises the villages of Aglish and Villierstown, plus the outlying areas of Ballinameela and Mount Stuart.

There are three Catholic churches within the parish: the Church of the Assumption (Aglish), the Church of St. James (Ballinameela; 1833), and Mount Stuart Church.

The three Catholic schools located within the parish are Aglish NS, Whitechurch NS, and Villierstown NS.
