= R672 road (Ireland) =

Regional road in County Waterford, Ireland

Coordinates: 52°08′35″N 7°41′39″W

R672 road
- Bóthar R672

Route information
- Length: 19.3 km (12.0 mi)

Major junctions
- From: R671 at Knockaraha Bridge
- N72 at Ballymacmague South; N25 at Kilrush Roundabout
- To: R911 at Dungarvan

Location
- Country: Ireland

Highway system
- Roads in Ireland; Motorways; Primary; Secondary; Regional
← R671	→ R673

The R672 road is a regional road in County Waterford, Ireland. It runs from Knockaraha Bridge (north of Ballinamult) southwards to Dungarvan.
