= Villierstown =

Village in County Waterford, Ireland

Villierstown An Baile Nua (Irish)
- Village
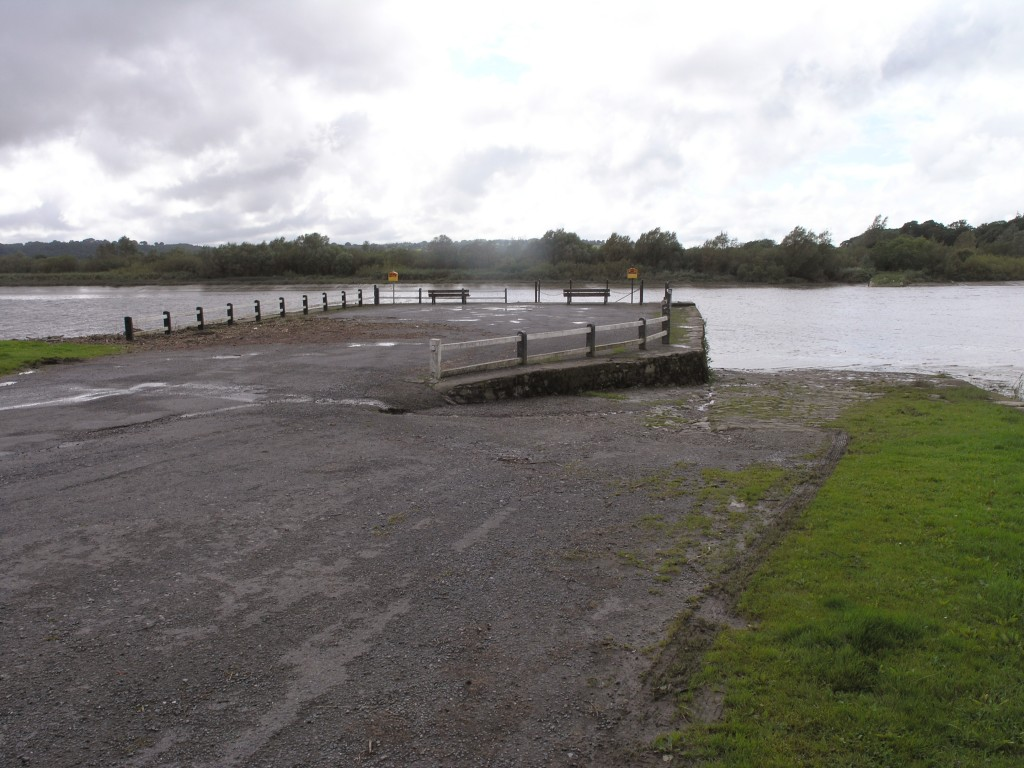
- Villierstown Quay on the River Blackwater

- Location in Ireland
- Coordinates: 52°05′17″N 7°51′08″W
- Country: Ireland
- Province: Munster
- County: Waterford

Population (2016)
  - Total: 276
- Time zone: UTC+0 (WET)
  - Summer (DST): UTC-1 (IST (WEST))

Villierstown (Irish: An Baile Nua, meaning 'the new town') is a village in west County Waterford, Ireland. It is situated on the banks of the River Blackwater, and was founded in the 1740s by a local landlord, John Villiers, as a base for the linen industry, and initially populated primarily from Lurgan. In the census of 2016, the population of the village was 276.

The village is approximately 8 kilometres from Cappoquin and 20 kilometres from both Dungarvan and Youghal.

== History ==
Villierstown was founded by the Villiers-Stuart family, from whom the name is derived. In the 1740s the 1st Earl Grandison, John Villiers, established the village to develop a linen industry. The village was initially populated with linen-weavers, some of whom were from Lurgan in County Armagh. The original village consisted of a church, a rectory, a school, 24 dwelling houses, a court, a police barracks and a quay on the river. All of these buildings are still in the village today. The church has been converted to a community hall; on its grounds is the Villiers-Stuart's family burial vault where many of its ancestors are buried.

=== 1841 ===
The statistics from the 1841 census paint a picture of Villerstown during that time. There was a population of 328 at this time. In regards to housing, Villierstown contained one 1st class house, which can be described as a superior house during that time, twenty-seven 2nd class houses which contained up to nine rooms with windows and stone walls, thirteen 3rd class houses which was a cabin with up to four rooms with windows and made up of mud walls and just ten 4th class houses which were one room mud cabins. Often there was more than one family living in each house. In comparison to other towns such as Aglish, Villierstown was in a much more privileged position in regards to housing.

Martin Norris operated the school within Villierstown, although the school was funded by the local landlord Villiers Stuart giving £30 per year. Arithmetic, reading and writing where the main subjects taught in the school. In 1841, 33% of men and women could read and write, and 8% of men and women could only read. In comparison to the neighboring parish of Aglish, these figures are impressive.

By the beginning of 1841 the linen industry had come to a standstill in Villierstown, the families that lived there moved into different occupations. Of the sixty-three families, thirty-two of them went into agriculture, twenty-six worked in manufacturing or trade industries and five worked across various other jobs.

During the Famine

During the Famine (1845–49), the linen industry in Villierstown died out. Some locals turned to fishing on the River Blackwater as a source of employment. The majority of villagers were given work by the Villiers-Stuarts on the estate at Dromana, which itself encompassed Villierstown and beyond as far as Dungarvan and Helvick, where the family occasionally resided in the summer. The Villiers-Stuart family were known to be one of the most civic-minded estate holders in Ireland: earlier Lord Stuart de Decies, himself a Protestant, spent much of his political life furthering the cause of Catholic Emancipation with Daniel O'Connell.

=== Post-Famine (1851) ===
The number of houses changed since 1841 as there was a decline in population as a result of the Famine, the population of Villierstown had dropped from 328 to 159.There was now 4 1st class houses,20 2nd class houses,9 3rd class houses and just 1 4th class house. illustrates how the poorer population of Villierstown had declined in comparison to 1841.There was now only one family per house, which improved the overall standard of living.

The census of 1851 shows that the number of men in Villierstown had declined as a result of the Famine. In 1851 there was a total of 67 men in comparison to 137 in 1841. These numbers may have declined due to death or the men leaving to find work. The number of women also declined from 133 in 1841 to 75 in 1851.

The number of people who could read and write in Villierstown rose to 71% in 1851 and 3 women and no men could only read, it could be suggested that the uneducated people of Villierstown chose to flee the area during the Famine.

=== Dromana House ===
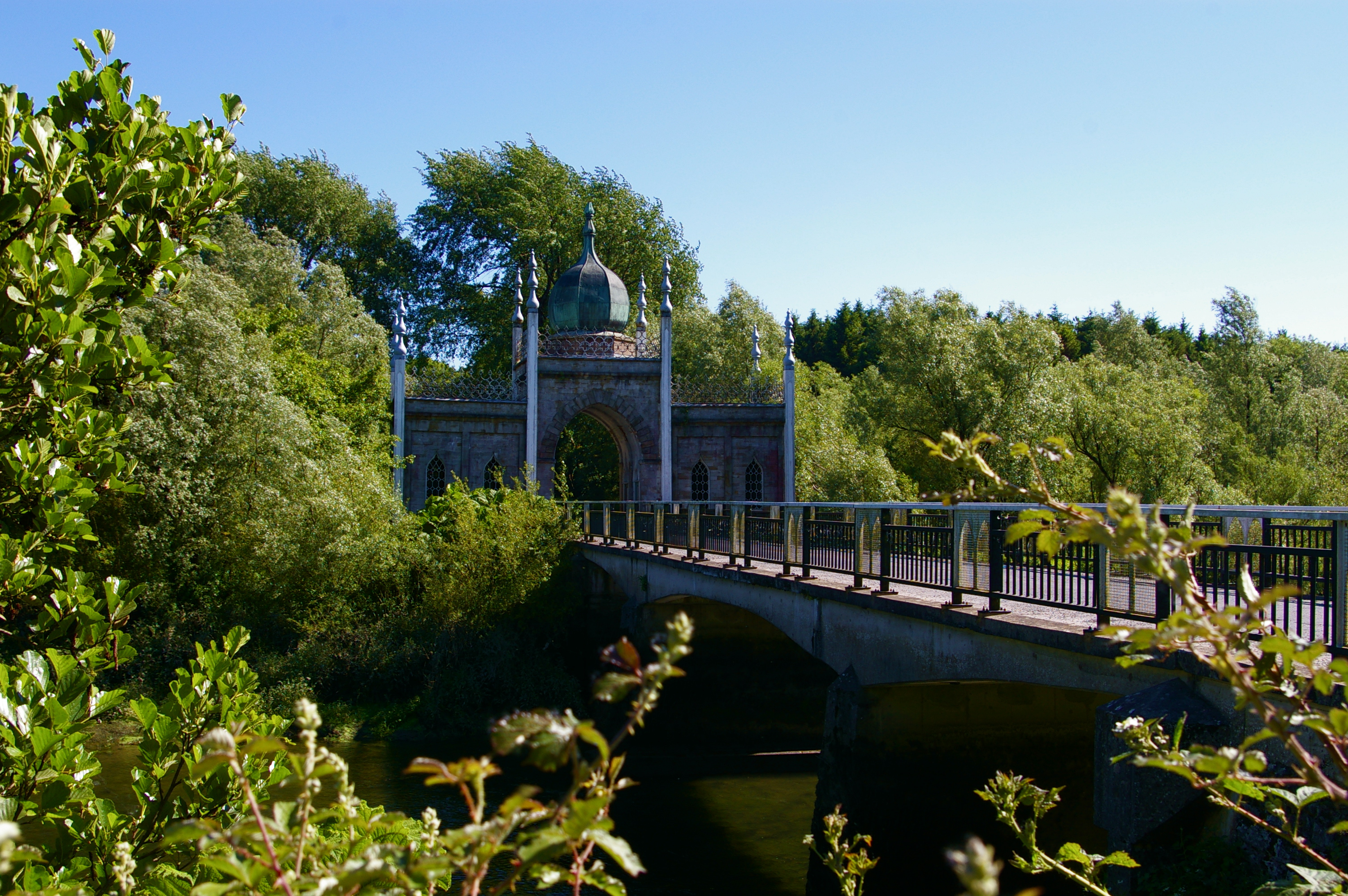
Ornamental gate lodge to the former Dromana estate.

The Villiers-Stuart family and their direct descendants have resided in Dromana House in its different forms for well over 700 years, on what was one of the very oldest continuing estates in Ireland. Dromana is perched high above the Blackwater, located between Villierstown and the town of Cappoquin. Dromana House succeeded a medieval castle built by a branch of the powerful FitzGerald family, who soon became FitzGerald-Villiers, Villiers, and finally Villiers-Stuart in 1800, at the entry of the Marquis of Bute's son, Henry Stuart, into the family. By the end of the seventeenth century, Dromana was destroyed after a number of sieges - but it was rebuilt. Between the 1750s and 1820s many additions were made to the house including an enormous "great bow-sided ballroom." There were also two large walled gardens on the estate, along with the bastion and banqueting house by the river.

By the 1820s the Dromana estate including around 40,000 acres (160 km^{2}). Part of this land today makes up Dromana Wood which is managed by Coillte on a long-term lease.

Thomas Carlyle wrote a lengthy description of a weekend stay at Dromana House in mid-July 1849. His host was Daniel O'Connell's political protege Lord Henry Mount Stuart of the Decries.

The estate was seized by the Land Commission, in return for near-worthless land bonds, and divided up, while the architecturally significant stables block, just south of the main avenue, was demolished by the Land Commission. The avenue, which stretches up to 5 kilometres from Dromana bridge to the Villierstown gate, is now publicly owned while the well-known Hindu Gothic styled gate lodge over the River Finisk is under the responsibility of the local County Council. In 1965 much of Dromana House was demolished, and all that remains today is the smaller 17th-century wing.

The family had to sell Dromana House in the 1960s, but they were able to repurchase in the early 1990s; they still reside there today. In August 2004 James Villiers-Stuart died and was buried at Villierstown Church.

=== 1921 Irish War of Independence ===
During the Irish War of Independence, Villierstown was located in a rebel stronghold. In May 1921 rebel forces launched an attack on the British Black and Tans near the bridge on the Dromana estate, an important crossing point on the river Blackwater. No casualties were reported from the attack.

== Protected Structures ==
There are many protected structures in Villierstown, County Waterford.

=== Villierstown School ===
This is a 2-story building which was built around 1770.The building was built with the purpose of being used as a school, it has been renovated over the years in order to accommodate for the rising number of pupils attending the school. It contains a hipped slate roof, hallow segmental-headed window openings in tripartite arrangement with stone sills, replacement cement rendered surrounds, and replacement 1/1 timber sash windows and a round-headed door opening under hipped open porch, on timber posts with replacement timber paneled door, having spoked fanlight.

=== Mary Villiers Stuart Monument ===
This is a free standing monument, which is very important to society due to its relation to Mary Villiers Stuart (1842 – 1907).It is made up of fine limestone ashlar and also contains carved elements which adds to the monuments picturesque appeal.

=== The Green ===
This is a detached, two storey, six bay house. The house still has most of its original form but has undergone renovations and contains some modern features. The house is located on the corner of the village and adds positively to the landscape.

=== Pilgrim's Rest ===
Detached three-bay two-story house built around 1850, it contains a hipped slate roof and timber sash window and a distinctive over light to the door opening. It also contains unpainted rendered piers, and wrought iron gate.

=== Hindo-Gothic Gate (Dromana Estate) ===
The gate designed by architect Martin Day is a combination of Gothic and Oriental styles and is the only example of Brighton Pavilion architecture in Ireland.

== People ==
- John Treacy, the former athlete and Olympic medalist, who represented Ireland at four Olympic Games between 1980 and 1992.

== Parish ==
It is part of the Roman Catholic parish of Aglish, Ballinameela and Mount Stuart and the Church of Ireland parish of Lismore.

== Community Development ==
In recent years great strides have been made by locally run groups to improve the development of Villierstown through different organisations such as the Villierstown Education and Culture Project (VECP). Multiple planning developments have been proposed to the Waterford County Council, indicating improvements been made in the local area.

== See also ==
- Viscount Decies
- List of towns and villages in the Republic of Ireland
