= R671 road (Ireland) =

Regional road in Ireland

R671 road
- Bóthar R671
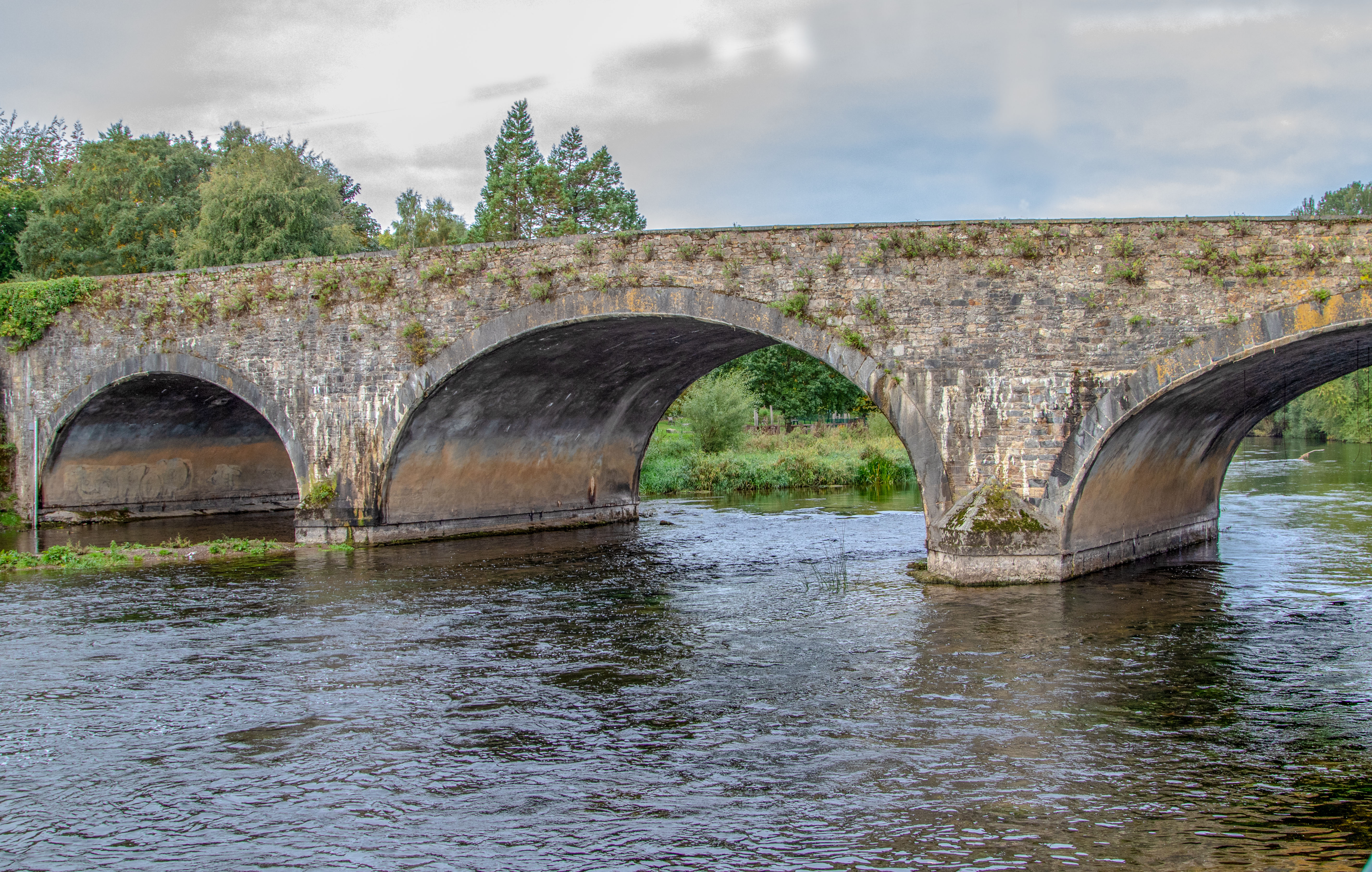
- Gashouse Bridge carries the R671 over the River Suir in Clonmel

Route information
- Length: 55.4 km (34.4 mi)

Major junctions
- From: R680 at The Mall, Clonmel, County Tipperary

- R680 at Coleville Road, Clonmel; R678 at Coleville Road, Clonmel; R665 at Kilmacomma, Clonmel; Enter County Waterford; R672 at Knockaraha Bridge; N72 at Kilcloher
- To: N25 at Pilltown Cross, County Waterford

Location
- Country: Ireland

Highway system
- Roads in Ireland; Motorways; Primary; Secondary; Regional
← R670	→ R672

The R671 road is a regional road in Ireland. It travels from Clonmel, County Tipperary to the N25 road in County Waterford, via the villages of Ballymacarbry and Clashmore. It follows the route of the former national trunk road T27. The road is 55.4 kilometres (34.4 mi) long.
