= Ballymacarbry =

Village in County Waterford, Ireland

Ballymacarbry Baile Mhac Cairbre
- Village
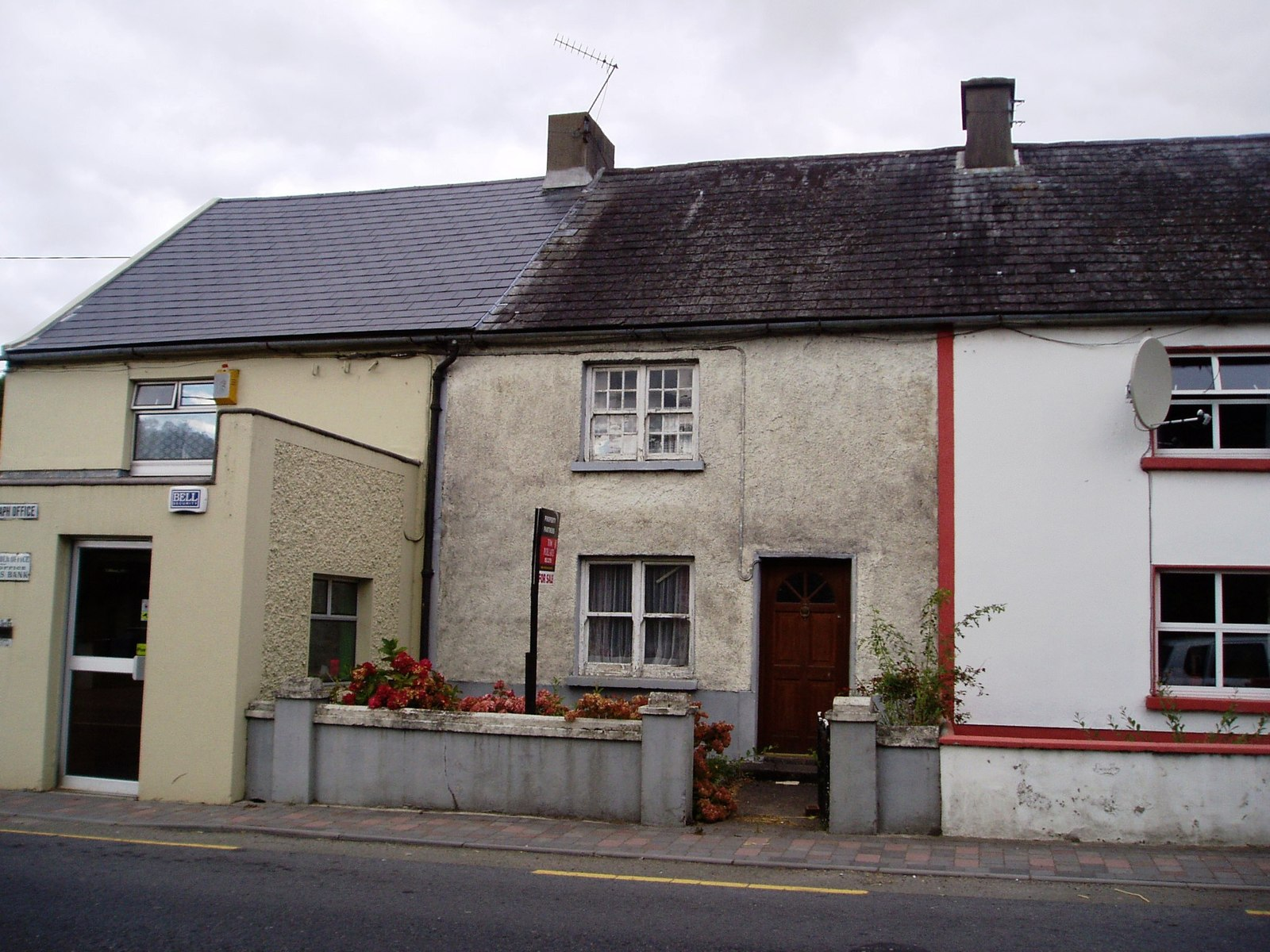
- Cottage next to Post Office in Ballymacarbry (2007)

- Location in Ireland
- Coordinates: 52°16′N 7°44′W
- Country: Ireland
- Province: Munster
- County: Waterford

Population (2016)
  - Total: 138
- Time zone: UTC+0 (WET)
  - Summer (DST): UTC-1 (IST (WEST))

Ballymacarbry or Ballymacarberry (Irish: Baile Mhac Cairbre, meaning 'homestead of Cairbre's son') is a village in County Waterford, Ireland with an approximate population of 140 people. It is situated on the R671 regional road, approximately 17 km from Clonmel and 24 km from Dungarvan. The local Gaelic games club is The Nire–Fourmilewater.

Ballymacarbry is in the civil parish of Kilronan and in the historical barony of Glenahiry.
