= Ballylaneen =

Village in County Waterford, Ireland

Ballylaneen Baile Uí Laithín
- Village
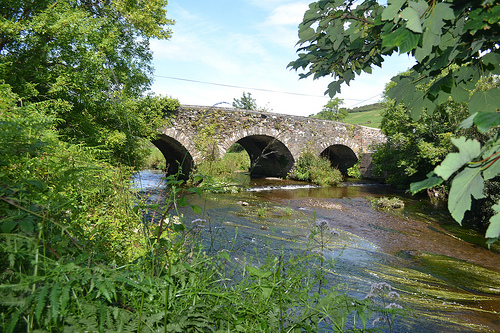
- Bridge over the River Mahon near Ballylaneen

- Location in Ireland
- Coordinates: 52°10′N 7°24′W
- Country: Ireland
- Province: Munster
- County: County Waterford
- Time zone: UTC+0 (WET)
  - Summer (DST): UTC-1 (IST (WEST))

Ballylaneen (Irish: Baile Uí Fhlaithnín previously spelt as Baile Uí Laithín) is a small village and townland in County Waterford, Ireland, approximately halfway between the villages of Kilmacthomas and Bunmahon on a hill by the River Mahon. Ballylaneen is in a civil parish of the same name.

== Features ==
The village features a Catholic church (St. Anne's, built in 1824), a public house, a now closed shop-garage and about seven dwelling houses. It also has St. Anne's Holy Well, where people are said to have gone to pray for cures in the past (enclosed by a wall in 1974). The village was larger in the 19th century and gave its name to a parish of its own, which was administered from Mothel, about 10 miles to the north. Today Ballylaneen is part of Stradbally parish, whose parish priest resides in Stradbally, about 4 miles away. The ruins of a large mill can be seen on the river Mahon, east of the village. This was one of five mills, which were sited on the river Mahon. The other four were at Mahonbridge (one) and Kilmacthomas (three). The present day village, with its church and graveyard, is actually situated in the townland of Carrigcastle, while the old school and old graveyard are located in the townland of Ballylaneen.

There are three graveyards associated with the village. The newer of these, adjacent to St Anne's church (built in 1824) has one grave of interest: a flat horizontal tombstone commemorating Mark Anthony of Carrigcastle (1786 – 1 June 1867) who was an officer in the Royal Navy and served in the battle of Trafalgar. The Anthonys, although catholic, were well-to-do and had a big house (still standing at Seafield about 1.5 miles from Ballylaneen) and lands in Carrigcastle and Seafield. There are also a few plots of local former Royal Irish Constabulary families in that graveyard although those families have dies out in the area. The second graveyard (called the 'old graveyard' and rarely used nowadays) is outside the present village on the Kilmacthomas road. It is the burial place of the famous poet Tadhg Gaelach Ó Súilleabháin (see below). Regarding the third: the 1837 Ordnance survey shows a (now defunct) burial ground in a stone-walled circular enclosure half a mile to the west of the village named locally as Cathair Breac. It's on a hill overlooking the present day village in an area known as Ballylaneen Upper. According to the Ordnance Survey mapping, it had the ruins of a Roman Catholic church and also a font. It appears this burial ground fell into disuse after the (above-mentioned) old graveyard was opened in the 1700s according to the dates on the gravestones there. Its church would have fallen into disuse with the building of the present-day church in 1824. No gravestones are visible in the earlier graveyard although the ground is much higher inside the stone enclosure than outside. On another hill in Carrigcastle (called Mandeville's Rock) south-west of the village, there is a subterranean neolithic corbel-roofed chamber, which was accidentally unearthed by a bulldozer during land reclamation in the early 1970s. It was filled in with stones for safety reasons.

The village had its own primary school, originally established under the British National School system. It was closed down in 1957, after which most of the pupils from the area attended Seafield near Bunmahon. The old school building is still standing adjacent to the old graveyard, and was refurbished as a holiday home in the 1990s.

The best-known teacher at the old National School was the Gaelic scholar Tom Walsh (Tomas Breathnach) around 1910. While he taught there, promising children from other school catchment areas attended, including John Kiely of Stradbally (later FRCSI) and David Hill of Kilmacthomas (later MPSI). Tom Walsh translated the Neo-Latin epitaph on the tombstone of Tadhg Gaelach Ó Súilleabháin (composed by Donnchadh Ruadh Mac Conmara, a poet friend of Tadhg) into Munster Irish.

Walsh was succeeded by Tom Cashin NT of Stradbally who taught in Ballylaneen until the school's closure and who features in accounts of the disappearance of Larry Griffin, the missing postman from Kilmacthomas in 1929.

The name Ballylaneen appears in a book title "The Road From Ballylaneen to Skellig Michael" by English writer Michael White, being randomly chosen for its good phonetic sound and its location near the south coast.

== People ==
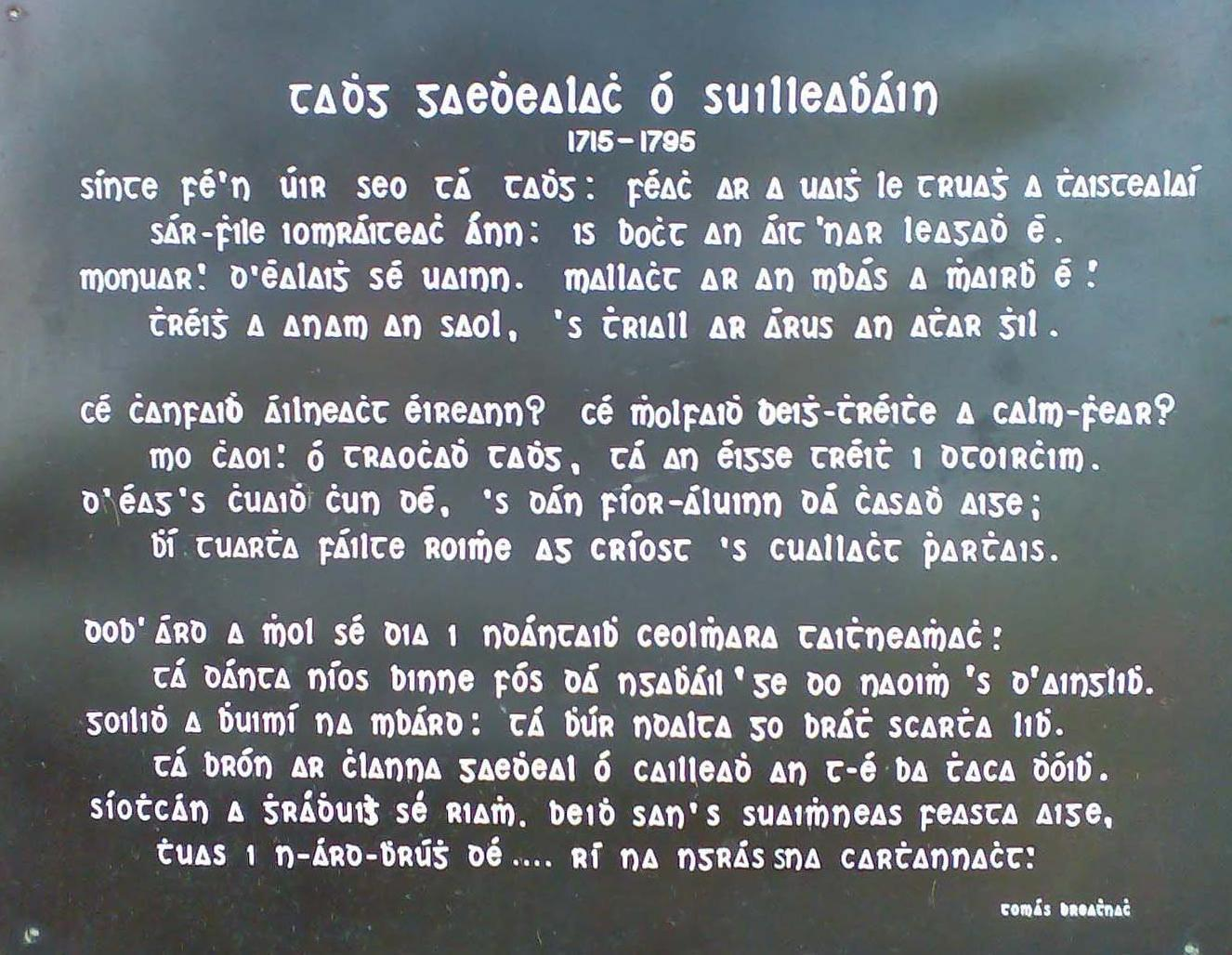
Inscription on the gravestone for Tadhg Gaelach Ó Súilleabháin originally composed by Donnacha Rua in Latin (carved on the gravestone) and translated to Irish shown on the black plaque (above) by teacher Tom Walsh around 1910.

The old graveyard in Ballylaneen is the burial place of the famous composer of Christian poetry in Munster Irish Tadhg Gaelach Ó Súilleabháin. His tombstone is a flat upright monument with a curved top and a Neo-Latin epitaph on the front. It's located a few metres from the gable end of the old National School building. The Latin epitaph was composed by the poet Donnchadh Ruadh Mac Conmara (buried in Newtown, 4 miles away), who was a friend of his. The Irish translation on the black plastic plaque (shown right) was done by Tom Walsh (Tomas Breatnac), the teacher in the old National School in the early 1900s. Tadhg Gaelach Ó Súilleabháin (Timothy O'Sullivan) was born in Tuar na Fola (Tournafulla), County Limerick around 1715. He moved first to Cork, where he lived for about 30 years, and later to County Waterford and died in Waterford City in 1795. His writings include Timothy O'Sullivan's Pious Miscellany published in English translation in 1802 in Clonmel (his work was originally written and published in Irish while he was alive). His works were republished in Irish in 1868 by John O'Daly Publishers, 9 Anglesea St., Dublin (see reprint at https://archive.org/stream/piousmiscellanyo00suoft#page/n3/mode/2up), and there is considerable information in the preface written by O'Daly, although O'Daly's account of Tadhg Gaelach's dates and birthplace are now agreed to be incorrect. Up to the time of his death, Tadhg Gaelach was admired and possibly sometimes looked after by a relatively prosperous local Catholic farming family, the O'Callaghans. He was also a frequent guest of Ballylaneen Parish Priest, Rev Richard Morrissey, who is most likely to be responsible for Tadhg's being buried here. Other patrons of his included an O'Phelan (Faoláin) family of the Decies, and one of his songs is written in their honour ("Do Seoirse agus Domhnall Ó Faoiláin" to be sung to the air of "Bonny Jane", see https://archive.org/stream/piousmiscellanyo00suoft#page/82/mode/2up). Tadhg Gaelach's hymns were published by an tAthair Pádraig Ua Duinnín in Dublin in 1903.

== See also ==
- List of towns and villages in Ireland
