= Flahavan's =

Irish milling company

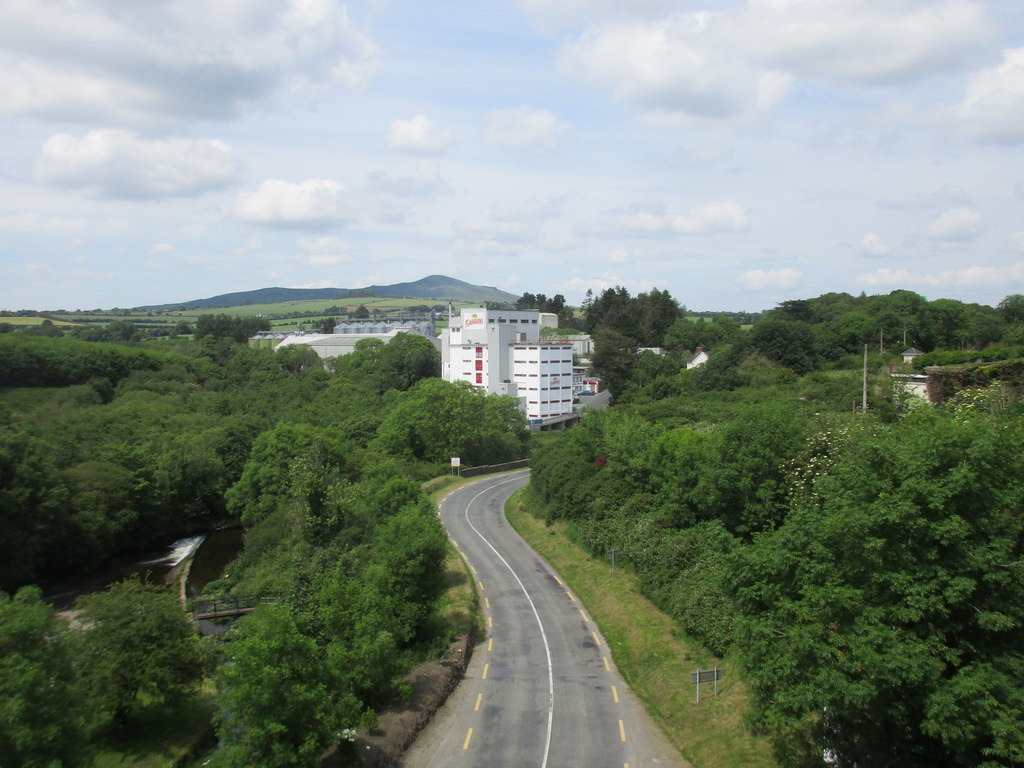
- Company flour mill, Kilmacthomas
- Type: Private
- Industry: Milling and Food manufacturing
- Founded: 1785
- Headquarters: Kilmacthomas, Waterford, Ireland
- Area served: Europe
- Revenue: €29.3m (2022)
- Website: www.flahavans.ie

Flahavan's is an Irish milling company which has been run by the Flahavan family since about 1785 located in the village of Kilmacthomas. The current chairman is John Flahavan.

The original mill was a watermill driven by the River Mahon in Kilmacthomas, County Waterford.

The Flahavan's factory now produces other items alongside its traditional porridge oats including oats-based breakfast cereals, rolled oats, cereals, muesli, flour, snack products, and baked oat products such as flapjacks and biscuits.

Flahavan's turnover reached €29.3m in 2022, up from €27.7m in the prior year.
