= Kilmacthomas =

Town in County Waterford, Ireland

Kilmacthomas Coill Mhic Thomáisín
- Town
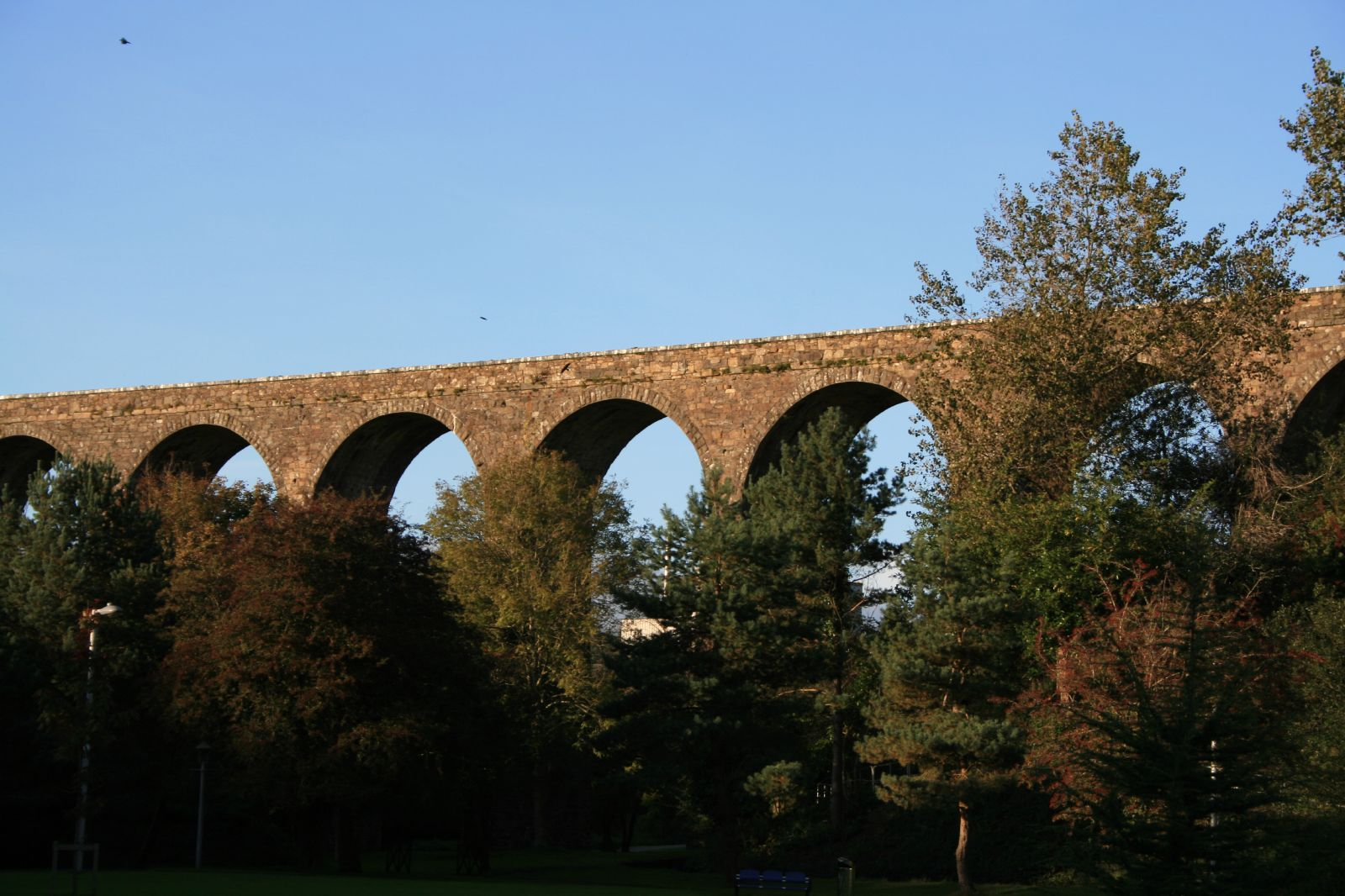
- The railway viaduct in Kilmacthomas

- Location in Ireland
- Coordinates: 52°12′25″N 7°25′21″W
- Country: Ireland
- Province: Munster
- County: County Waterford
- Elevation: 50 m (160 ft)

Population (2016)
  - Total: 834
- Time zone: UTC+0 (WET)
  - Summer (DST): UTC+1 (IST (WEST))
- Irish Grid Reference: S392060

Kilmacthomas or Kilmactomas (Irish: Coill Mhic Thomáisín), often referred to locally as "Kilmac", is a town on the River Mahon in County Waterford, Ireland. It lies on the R677, a road north of the N25 national primary road from Cork to Rosslare Harbour.

== History ==
During the Cromwellian conquest of Ireland, in December 1649, Oliver Cromwell marched from Waterford to Kilmacthomas during the Siege of Waterford. The weather was wet and stormy and the river was in flood, so the army could not cross. Two nights were spent in the field that is now the public park. Cromwell was said to have described Waterford county on his march from Waterford to Kilmacthomas in the winter of 1649 as being a craggy and desolate place.

After returning to Ireland after several years in Newfoundland, 18th-century Irish-language poet Donnchadh Ruadh Mac Conmara converted to Protestantism and joined the Church of Ireland parish at Rossmire, Newtown near Kilmacthomas. He was briefly appointed as parish clerk, but it is said that when the Vicar and parishioners discovered how great a rake he was, Donnchadh Ruadh was dismissed and converted back to Catholicism.

Daniel O'Connell passed through Kilmacthomas on a campaign trail and he wrote:

We breakfasted at Kilmacthomas, a town belonging to the Beresfords but the people belong to us. They came out to meet us with green boughs and such shouting you can have no idea of. I harangued them from the window of the inn, and we had a good deal of laughing at the bloody Beresfords. Judge what the popular feeling must be when in this, a Beresford town, every man their tenant, we had such a reception.

Kilmacthomas Woollen Mills was established in 1846 by the Beresford family and by 1876 had enlarged to a scale employing over 200 workers with a market for Kilmacthomas Tweed as far as Japan. In 1912 it was sold off to Stephenson Brothers & Co. who continued business until c.1922.

In the early 1870s, further influence of the industrial revolution reached Kilmacthomas when the Waterford to Mallow railroad came to town. There is an example of a stone viaduct in the town spanning the Mahon River. Although the last passenger services ceased in the late 1960s the railway continued to operate with the haulage of oil and magnesite for another couple of decades. This railway is now disused. The viaduct at Kilmacthomas has been preserved and is part of the Waterford Greenway, which opened in 2017.

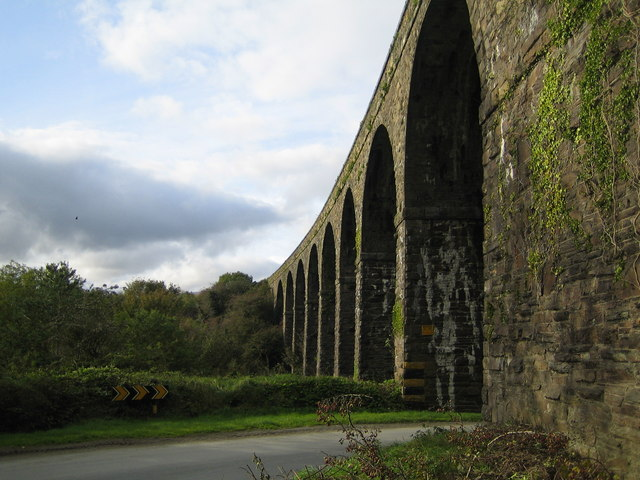
Kilmacthomas viaduct

Historical population
Year	Pop.	±%
1841	2,921	—
1851	1,831	−37.3%
1861	1,542	−15.8%
1871	1,365	−11.5%
1881	1,429	+4.7%
1891	1,157	−19.0%
1901	1,085	−6.2%
1911	1,121	+3.3%
1926	943	−15.9%
1936	912	−3.3%
1951	884	−3.1%
1961	876	−0.9%
1971	893	+1.9%
1981	1,075	+20.4%
1991	1,162	+8.1%
2002	1,183	+1.8%
2006	783	−33.8%
2011	871	+11.2%

== Geography ==
The town has a population of 1,768. The chief tourist attractions of the locality are the Mahon Falls and Waterford Greenway.

The village is situated on the River Mahon, the east bank is known as Kilmacthomas and the west bank as Gruaigeshuneen (Gráig Sheoinín). The postal area of Kilmacthomas can include Newtown (Baile Nua), Ballylaneen (Baile Uí Fhlaithnín), Lemybrien (Léim Uí Bhriain), Kill (An Chill), Mahon Bridge (Droichead na Machan), The Nire (Gleann na hUidhre), and Kilrossanty (Cill Rosanta). The N25 bridge over the River Mahon is named after local sporting hero Percy Kirwan.

The Mahon River has a stock of wild brown trout. The salmon run mostly in the autumn and winter, but start running from the end of June. Salmon trout (know locally as "Pale") are also found in the river. Sea trout run in late July and August. There has been a collapse in fish stocks in the 1980s and 1990s but stocks are on the rise once more since a moratorium on netting has been emplaced.

Geologically Kilmacthomas gives its name to the "Kilmacthomas Formation", which is composed of Palaeozoic deep marine metasediments and metavolcanics. Evidence of manganese nodules has been noted in the new bypass cutting recently constructed near the village.

Kilmacthomas is located halfway between Waterford City and the county capital, Dungarvan. West of the village are the foothills of the Comeragh mountains, while five miles to the south is the 'Copper Coast' with the beach of Bonmahon / Bunmahon (Bun Machan).

== Economy ==
- The Flahavan's cereal factory began milling Irish oats in about 1785. Nowadays it makes oatmeal and other cereal products.
- The former Famine Workhouse has been converted into Kilmacthomas Business Centre playing host to many Waterford Greenway visitors with 70 employed on-site through Coach House Coffee, Waterford Greenway Bike Hire & Mayfield Birds of Prey.
- Kilmacthomas acts as a commuter town for Waterford and Dungarvan.
- Penn Products Furniture made handmade fitted furniture from 1973 until its closure in 2024

== Education ==
There are four schools in Kilmacthomas. St Declan's Community College is the largest second-level school in the county, with around 700 pupils. The (Kilmac') Convent Primary school caters for younger pupils, while preschool pupils attend the Naíonra on the High Road.

Kilmacthomas Boys National School operated from 1966 until 2003 when it amalgamated with the Convent Primary School.

== Sports clubs ==
Gaelic Athletic Association clubs in the area include:

- Kilmacthomas GAA Club, Union Road, Kilmacthomas, County Waterford
- Kilmacthomas Juvenile GAA Club, Union Road, Kilmacthomas, County Waterford
- Saint Mary's Juvenile GAA Club, Dunphy's Pub, Newtown, Kilmacthomas, County Waterford
- John Mitchels, Kilnagrange, Kilmacthomas, County Waterford

== People ==
- Larry Griffin, the postman who disappeared in Stradbally on Christmas Day 1929, was living in Kilmacthomas at the time.
- Gillian Norris, lives and works in Kilmacthomas, where she runs her own beauty salon and spa.
- Ann Ormonde, Fianna Fáil politician
- Tyrone Power (1795–1841), actor, comedian, author and theatrical manager was born here
- Benji Whelan, Gaelic football manager

== See also ==
- List of towns and villages in Ireland
