= River Mahon =

River in County Waterford, Ireland

River Mahon An Mhachain
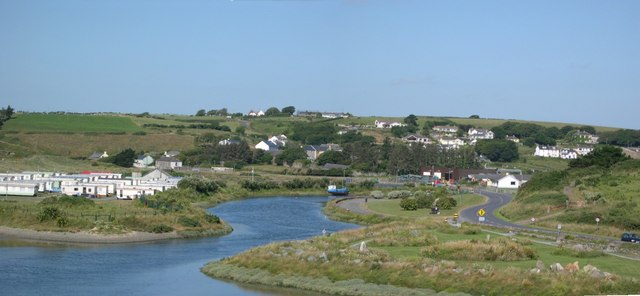
- The mouth of the River Mahon at Bunmahon

Location
- County: County Waterford
- Country: Ireland

Physical characteristics
- Mouth
  - location: Bunmahon
  - coordinates: 52°08′N 7°22′W

Basin features
- Waterfalls: Mahon Falls

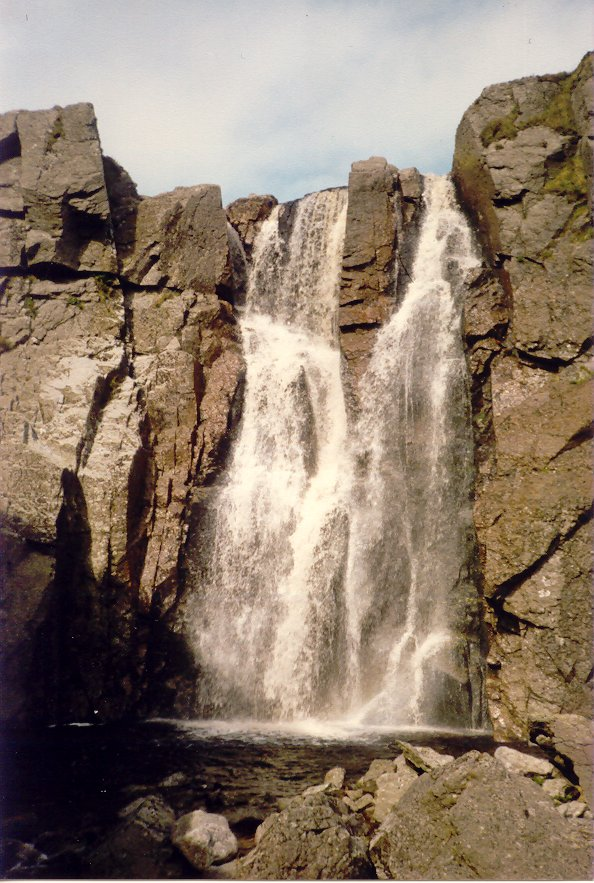
Mahon Falls, where the river falls from the Comeragh plateau.

The River Mahon (Irish: an Mhachain) rises in the Comeragh Mountains and enters the sea at Bunmahon in County Waterford, Ireland.

== Course ==
Rising on the plateau of the Comeragh Mountains the river flows 300m down the side of Coum Mahon, formed in the Munsterian period of glaciation approximately 100,000 years ago. The Mahon Falls are a series of cascading waterfalls with the main drop 80m high.

The river continues past a hawthorn "fairy tree" identified by ribbons tied to its branches (the tree was chopped down and replanted). Local lore talks of a Magic Road where a stopped car is said to roll backwards up a hill.

The river then passes through the village of Mahon Bridge and towards Kilmacthomas and Flahavan's Mill where is passes under an 8-arched rail viaduct which is now part of the Waterford Greenway.

The river is joined by the Ách Mór tributary river at Ballylaneen and ends its journey three miles further downstream at Bunmahon on Ireland's south coast. It drains into the region of the Atlantic Ocean known as the Celtic Sea.

== Industry ==
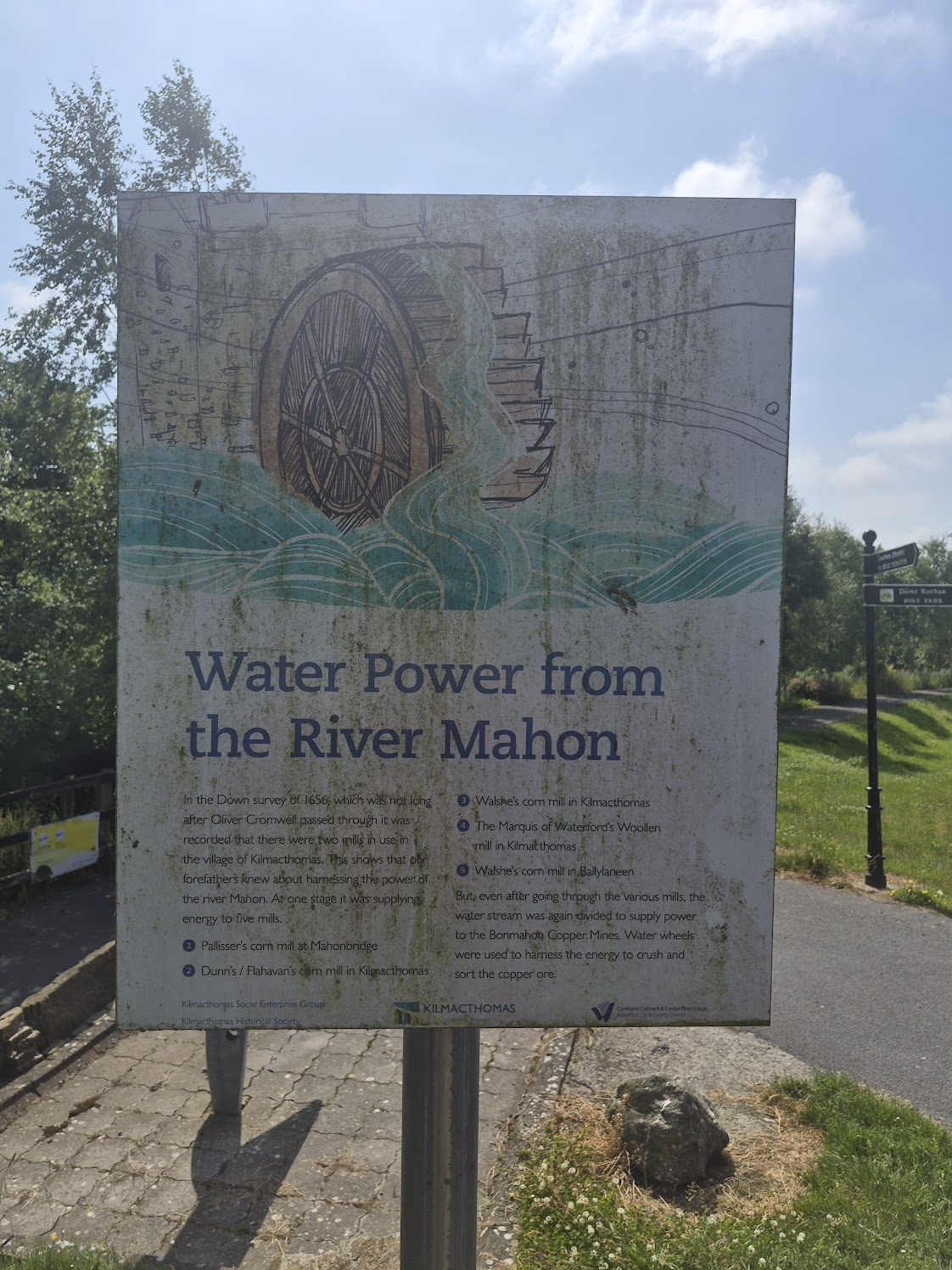
Information about the Mills on the River Mahon from Waterford Council at Kilmacthomas River Walk

In former times, the River Mahon powered five different mills along its course.

The first mill to harness the power of the river for industry was Palliser's Mill at Mahon Bridge. The mill was built by the Palliser family who lived at Comeragh House in the area. The mill has been described in different ways down through the years. Originally documented as a corn mill, it was named as Ardagh's Folly after Rev, Ardagh, a Protestant minister in the area during the time of the famine, as the commercial success of the mill was in doubt because of the desperation of the time and the lack of corn or customers. The mill was later used as a saw mill, before it fell into its current condition of disrepair and ruin.

There were three water mills at Kilmacthomas. Dunn's/Flahavan's mills at Kilmacthomas was established in 1785 as an oat-milling business which is still in operation on the same site.

Walsh's Corn Mill, in the centre of Kilmacthomas, was redeveloped into apartments in 2008.

The Marquis of Waterford's Woollen Mill/Factory was established in 1840, under instruction from Louisa, Lady Waterford, the wife of the third Marquis, to provide employment in the town during the Great Famine. The mill was later bought by the Stephenson Brothers, Staffordshire in 1920, and later used by Flahavans as a grain drying store. It is now in use as an Art Gallery.

Carrigcastle Mill, at Ballylaneen further along the river, was a four-storey corn mill built c. 1815 with a mill race diverting water from the River Mahon.

== Sport and leisure ==
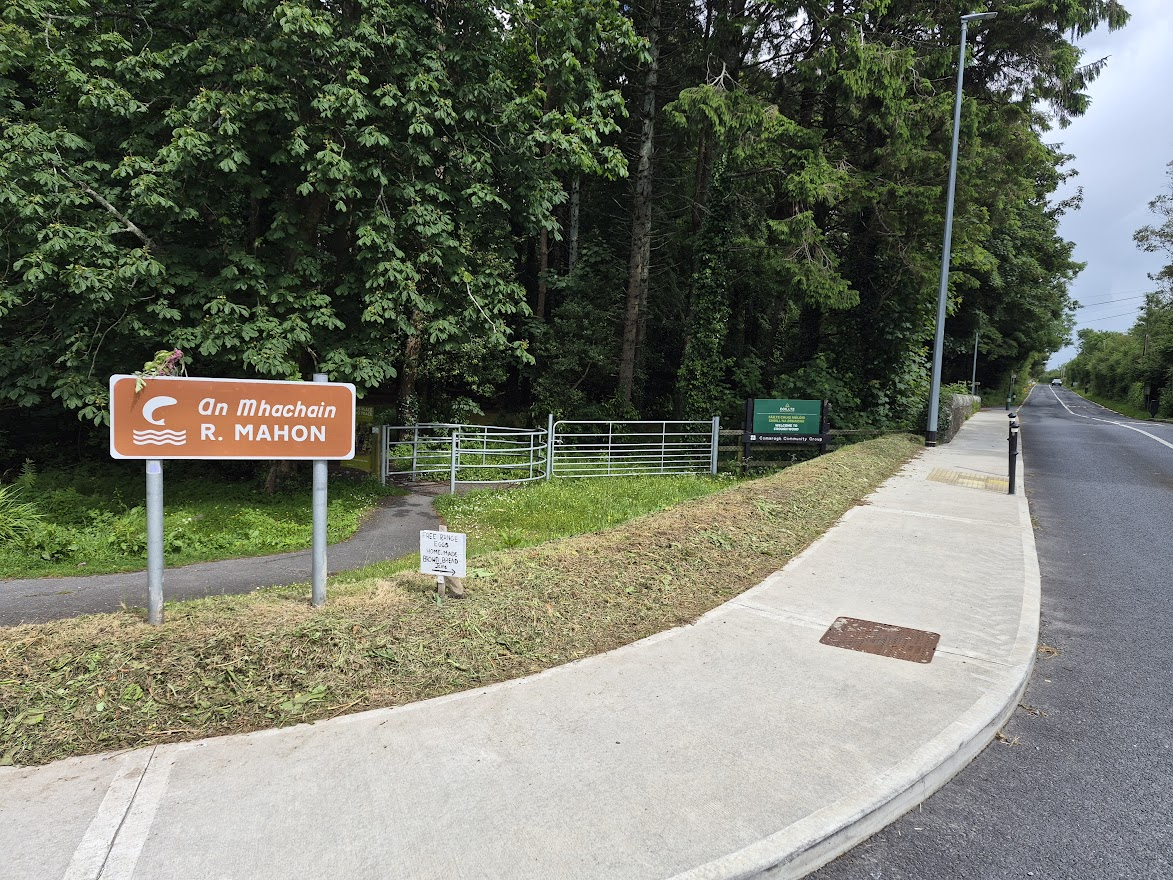
Crough Wood walk at Mahon Bridge

There are a number of walking trails along the course of the river and the Mahon Valley. These include the Mahon Falls Walk, through Coum Mahon, which is a paved 1.5 km walk which runs from a car park and amenity area to the base of the falls.

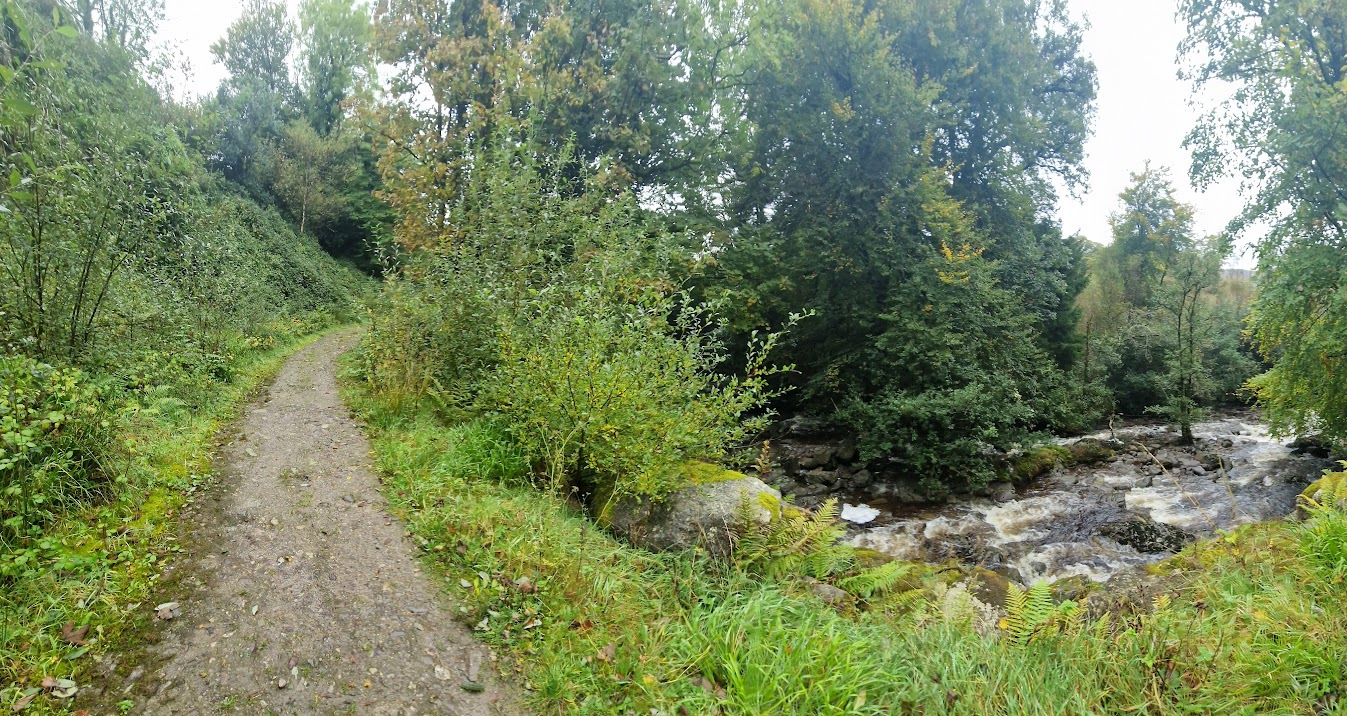
Crough Wood Walk

The Crough Wood Walk (pronounced locally as "Crew Wood"), starts at Mahon Bridge and follows the river upstream through forest and open areas for approximately 2.7 km. The public walkway was developed by the Comeragh Community Development Group starting in 1996. Crough Wood was among the winners of the RDS Forestry Awards in 2025. In May 2026 Waterford County Council was asked to fund a proposed plan which would link the Comeragh Mountains to Bunmahon, from the Mahon Falls and Crough Wood, and linking with the Waterford Greenway. At the Mahon Bridge end of the Crough Wood Walk is a large car park, children's playground, seating and bicycle parking.

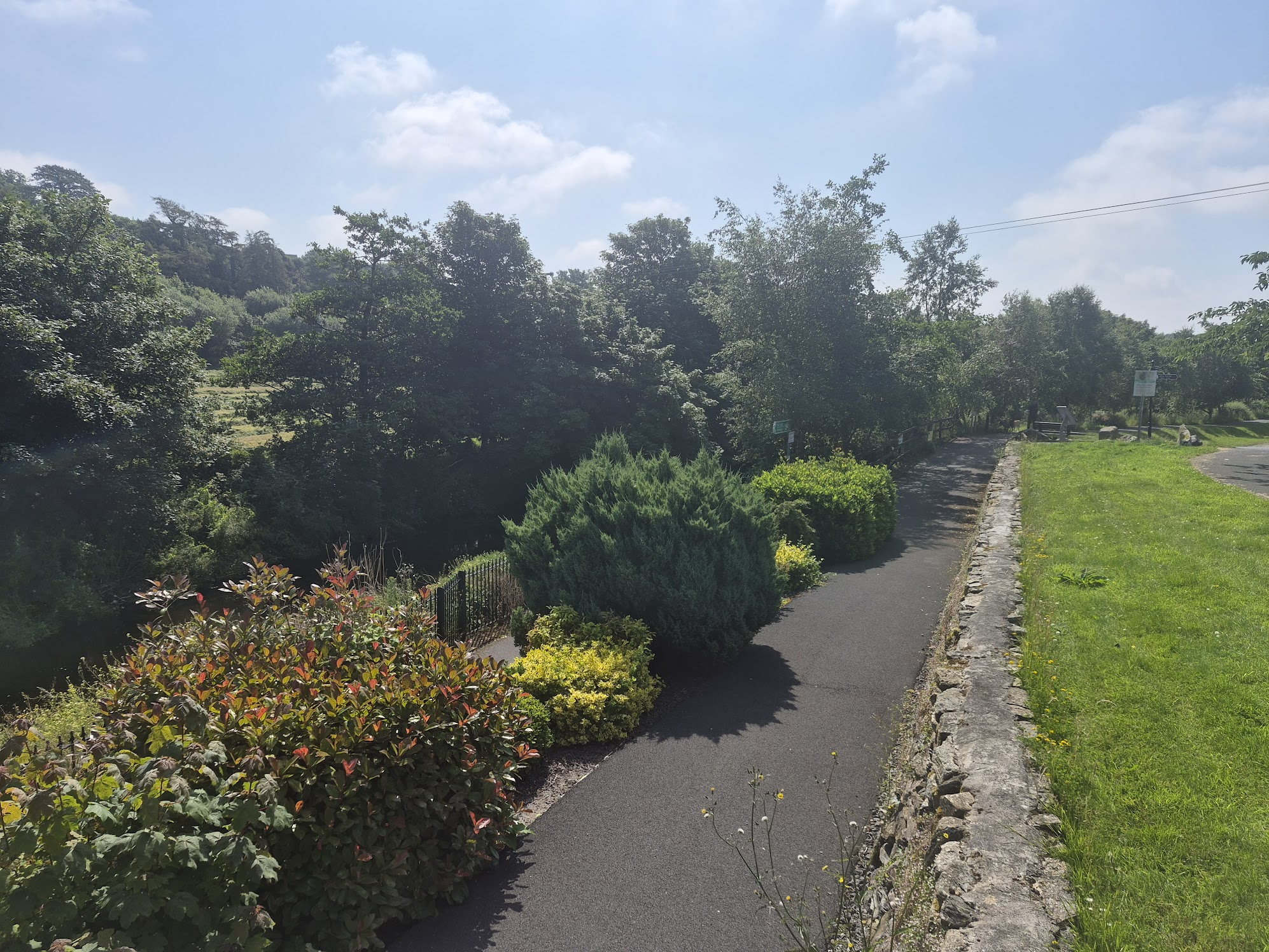
Kilmacthomas River Walk

The Kilmacthomas River Walk opened in 2012. A further 800m paved section of the trail, alongside the bank of the river, was opened in 2024 as part of a loop walk in Kilmacthomas.

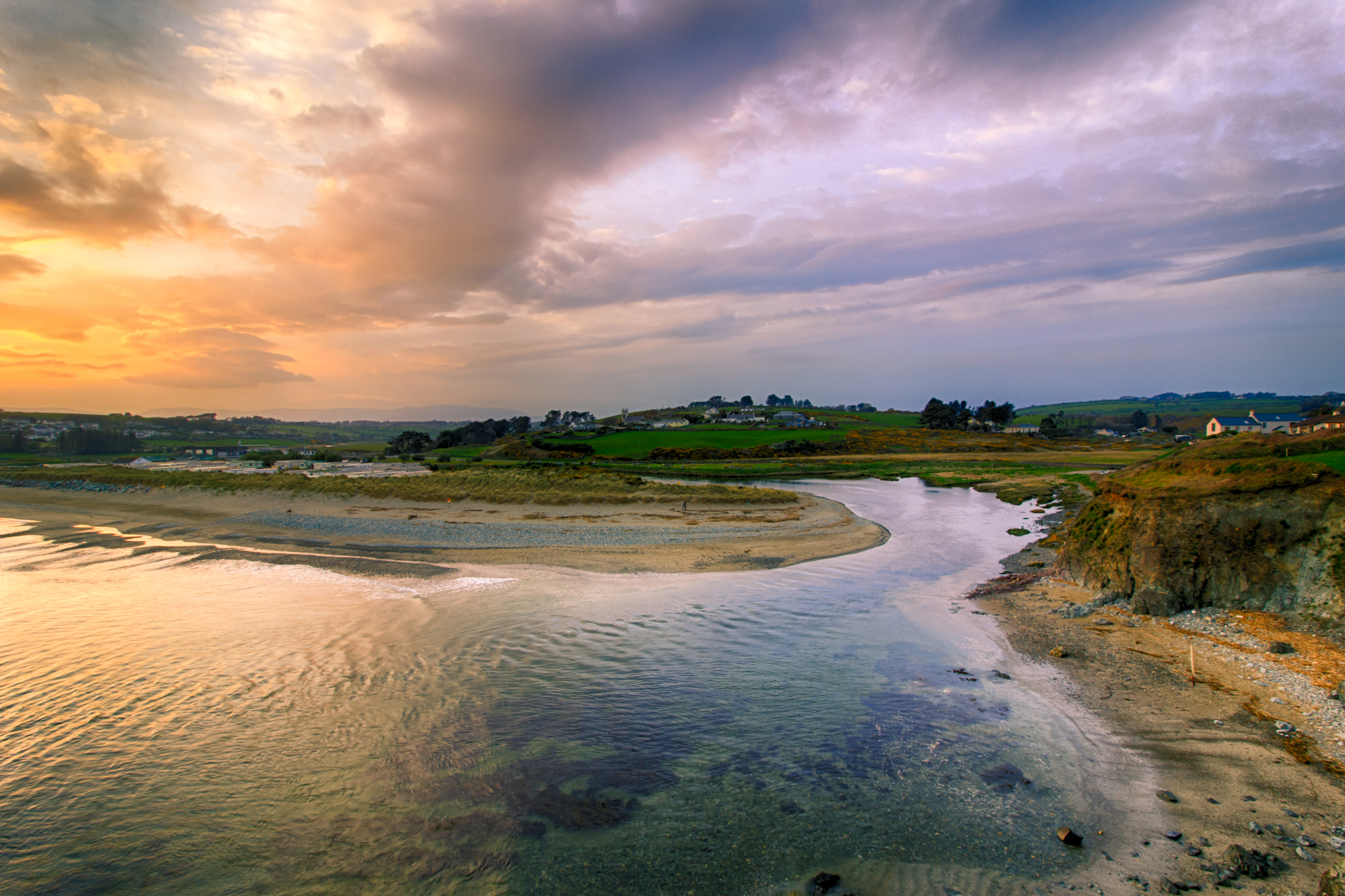
Bunmahon Beach with the River Mahon entering the sea

The river is also used by whitewater kayakers. There has been no known source-to-sea descent to date but the river has been paddled from Mahon Bridge to the sea at Bonmahon by an international team of B1 and B2 kayakers in August 2012. On 21 October 2005, Michael Reynolds, a kayaker from Tramore, County Waterford, performed the only known descent in a kayak of a vertical 55 foot drop at the top of Mahon Falls.
