= River Clodiagh =

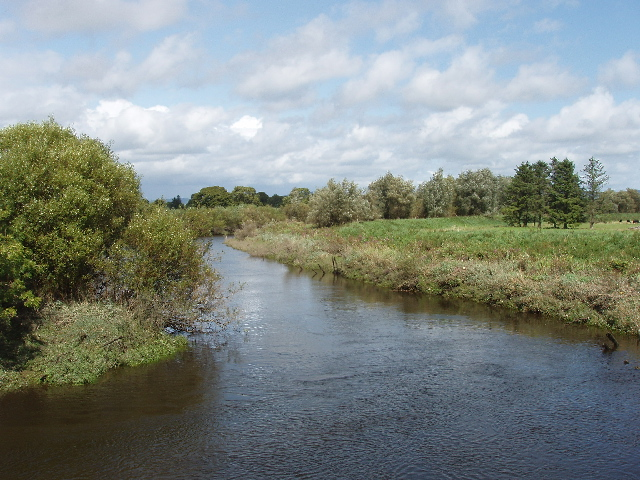
- The River Clodiagh near Portlaw
- Native name: An Chlóideach (Irish)

Location
- Country: Ireland
- County: County Waterford

Basin features
- Progression: River Suir

The River Clodiagh (Irish: An Chlóideach) is a small river which rises in Lough Coumduala in the Comeragh Mountains in north County Waterford. It flows through the villages of Rathgormack, Clonea-Power and Portlaw before joining the River Suir just outside Portlaw. The river is fed by a number of smaller tributaries including Hunts stream and Aughtnawilliam stream.

The river is used for canoeing, kayaking and fishing. In April 2010, two canoeists on a sit-on kayak drowned after being stuck in a weir at Portlaw.
