= Rathgormack =

Village in County Waterford, Ireland

Rathgormack Ráth Ó gCormaic
- Village
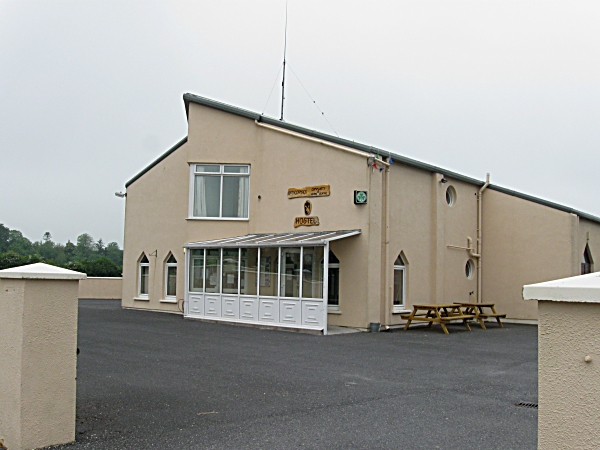
- Hostel and hiking centre in Rathgormack

- Location in Ireland
- Coordinates: 52°18′20″N 7°29′46″W
- Country: Ireland
- Province: Munster
- County: County Waterford
- Time zone: UTC+0 (WET)
  - Summer (DST): UTC-1 (IST (WEST))
- Website: https://www.rathgormack.ie

Rathgormack or Rathgormac (Irish: Ráth Ó gCormaic, meaning 'Cormac's ringfort') is a village and parish in northern County Waterford, Ireland.

== Amenities ==
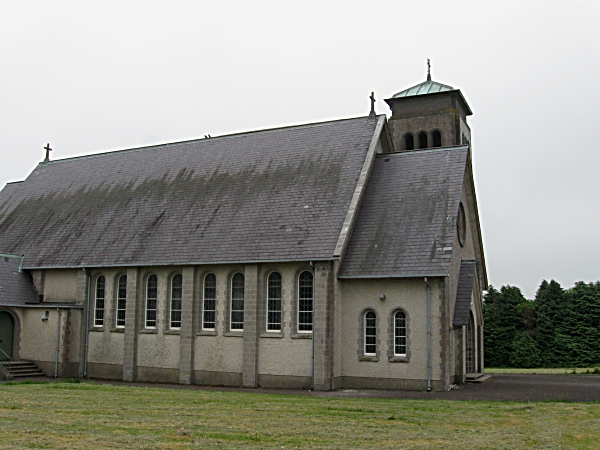
Rathgormuck's Roman Catholic church

The village has a pub, a shop, a newly made all-weather pitch, a recreational park, a national school and a Roman Catholic Church

Rathgormack made national headlines in 2021 when, to avoid the loss of the village's last pub, 19 locals invested €12,000 each and formed a company to purchase it.

== Geography ==
The village is 27 km west of Waterford city. The closest centres of population to Rathgormack are the County Tipperary towns of Carrick-on-Suir (7 km to the north-east) and Clonmel. It is the twin parish of Clonea-Power.

The population of the area is around 1200. Farming and agriculture-related industries are the main sources of employment. Tourism is also important, with a hiking centre located in the village. It caters mainly for hikers to the nearby Comeragh Mountains. The town is overlooked by Cruachán Paorach.

== History ==
In 1921, during the Irish War of Independence, a District Inspector of the Royal Irish Constabulary, Gilbert Potter was executed by Dinny Lacey of the Third Tipperary Brigade of the Irish Republican Army (IRA) on the banks of the River Clodagh, about 1 km south of the village.

== Sport ==
The local Gaelic Athletic Association club, Rathgormack GAA, was founded in 1884.

== See also ==
- List of towns and villages in Ireland
