= Bunmahon =

Coastal village in County Waterford, Ireland

Bonmahon Bun Machan
- Village
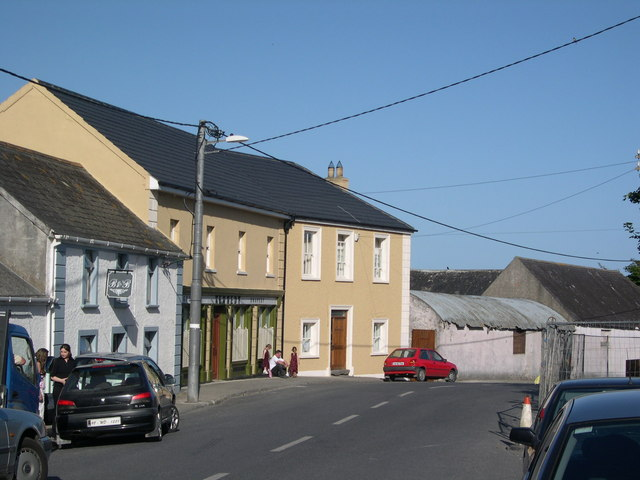
- Main Street

- Location in Ireland
- Coordinates: 52°08′24″N 7°22′19″W
- Country: Ireland
- Province: Munster
- County: County Waterford
- Time zone: UTC+0 (WET)
  - Summer (DST): UTC-1 (IST (WEST))

Bunmahon (Irish: Bun Machan, meaning 'river-mouth of Mahon'), also called Bonmahon, is a coastal village in County Waterford, Ireland, at the mouth of the River Mahon. It is 21 km south-west of Waterford city (25 km by road). During the 19th century, when copper mines operated in the area, Bonmahon was a mining village. As of the 21st century, the village and its beach lie on a tourist route.

== History ==
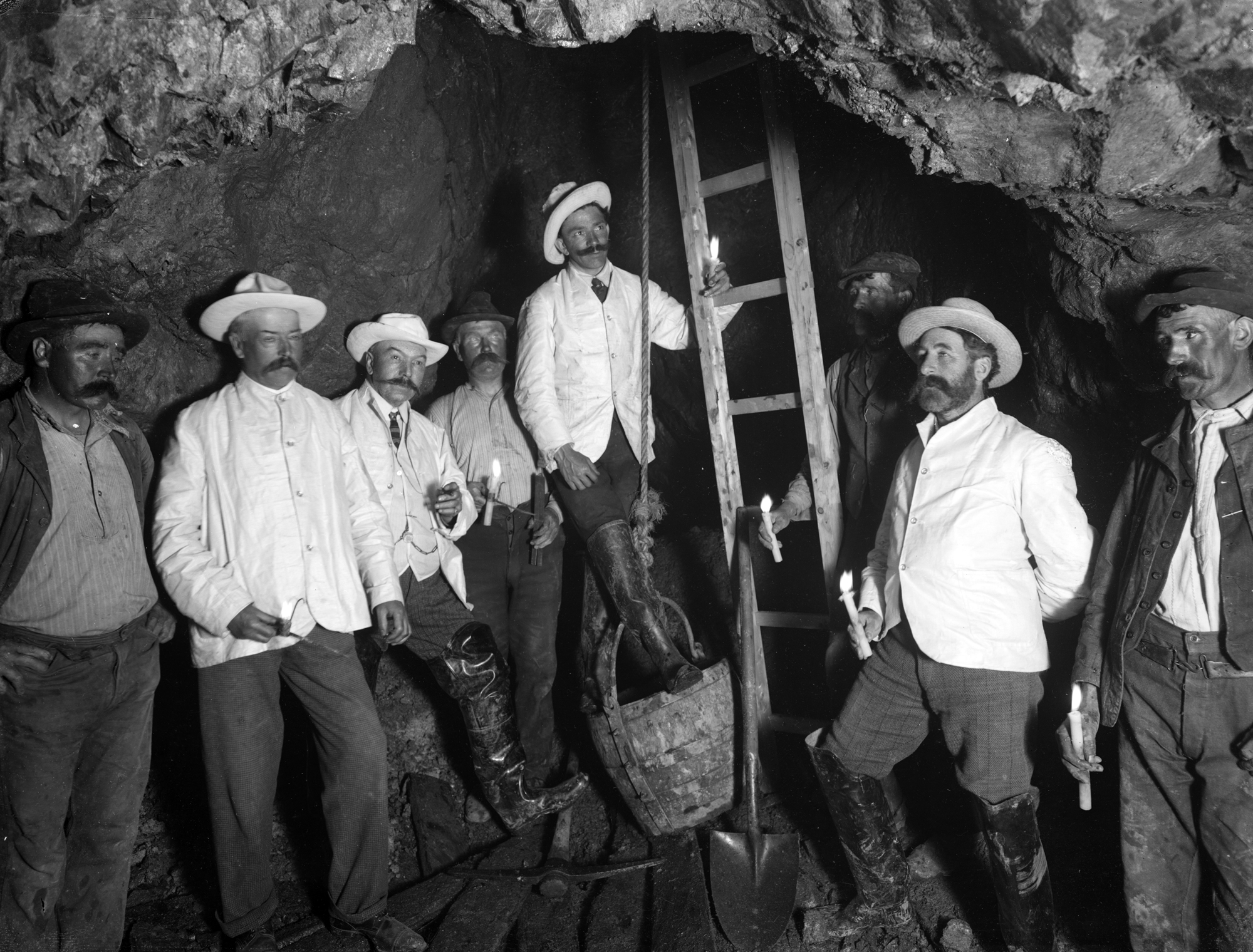
Men at Bonmahon Mines in the early 1900s

Evidence of ancient settlement in the area includes a number of Ogham stone and ringfort sites in the surrounding townlands of Ballynagigla and Knockmahon.

Bonmahon was a mining village for much of the 19th century, and copper and lead was mined here between 1827 and 1877. Much of the village was laid-out in this period, and the local Church of Ireland church was built in the 1820s. A temperance hall was built in the village in 1842, and this was converted during the 1850s to become St. Mary's Roman Catholic Church. The population of the village swelled to over 2,000 at that time. The village was home to a pawn shop, a creamery and a bacon factory, as well as 21 public houses.

The history and mining activity of this period is covered in The Making and Breaking of a Mining Community, published in 2006. One of the mine workers was Thomas Wheatley, whose son John Wheatley later went on to be Minister for Health for the first Labour Party government in the United Kingdom in 1924.

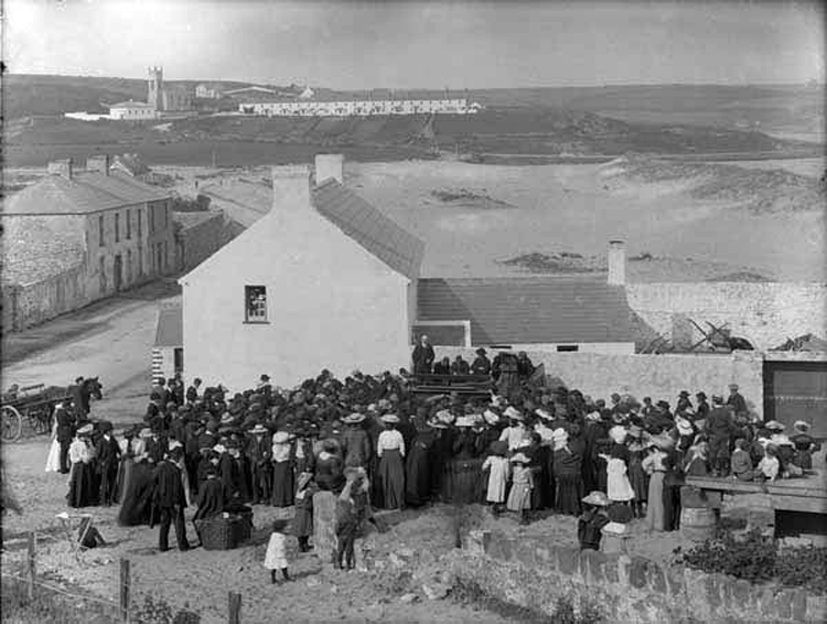
Public meeting involving mining company staff held in Bonmahon in 1906

== Places of interest ==
Bunmahon lies within a UNESCO Global Geopark. The Copper Coast Geopark operates a visitor centre in the village's former Church of Ireland church. The Copper Coast is home to several beaches and wildlife, including foxes, rabbits, and diverse bird species.

The local beach is used by surfers use all year round, and a surfing school runs in the summer months. The village's Tidy Towns committee has created a boardwalk along the sand dunes, as well as working to improve access to the neighbouring cove of Tra na mBó. The beach and surrounding coast is covered by the Bonmahon Unit of the Irish Coast Guard.

== People ==
- John Wheatley (1869–1930), Scottish socialist politician born in Bunmahon

== See also ==
- List of towns and villages in Ireland
