= Landscape =

Visible features of a land area

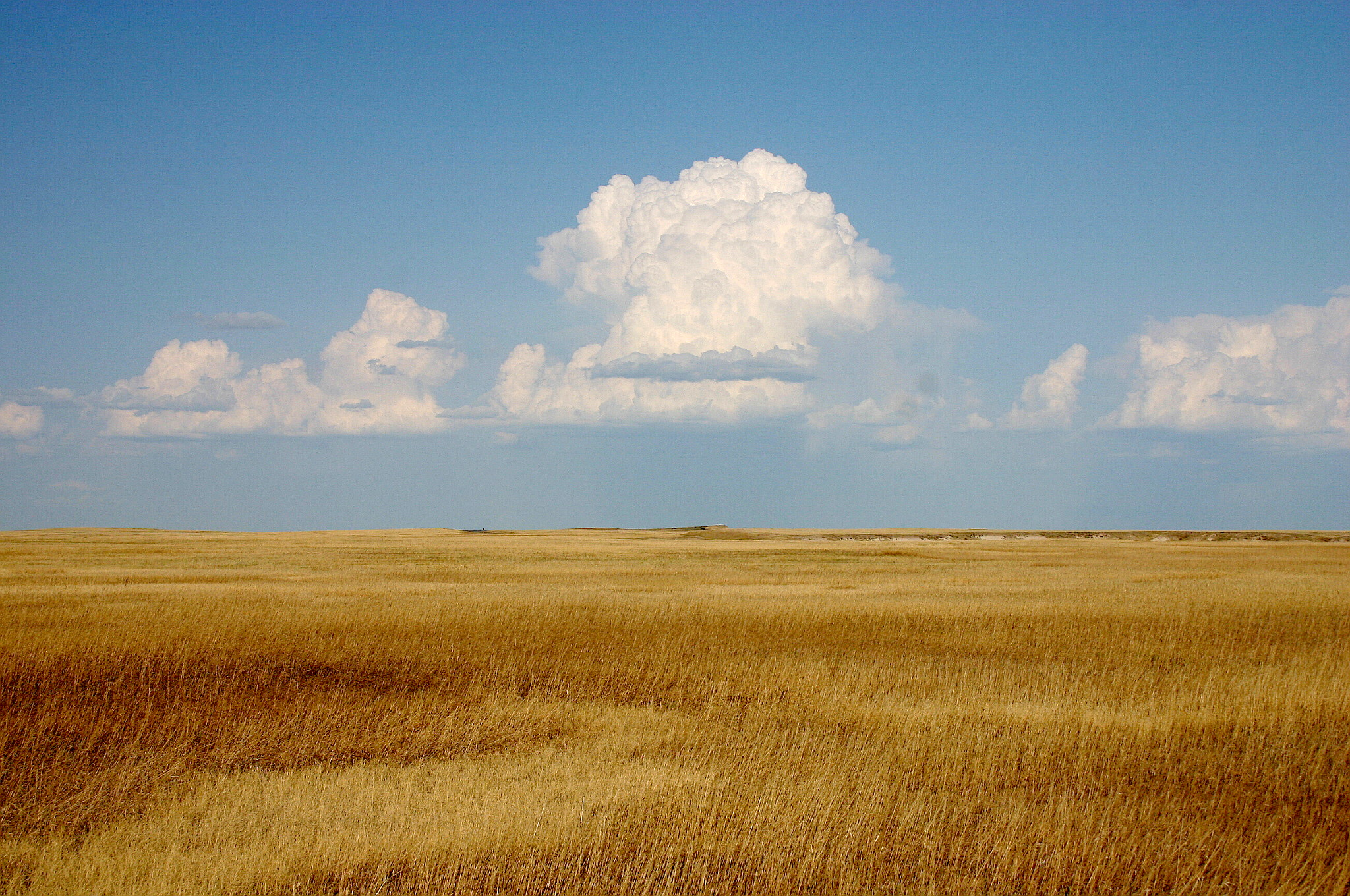
A prairie: Badlands National Park, South Dakota

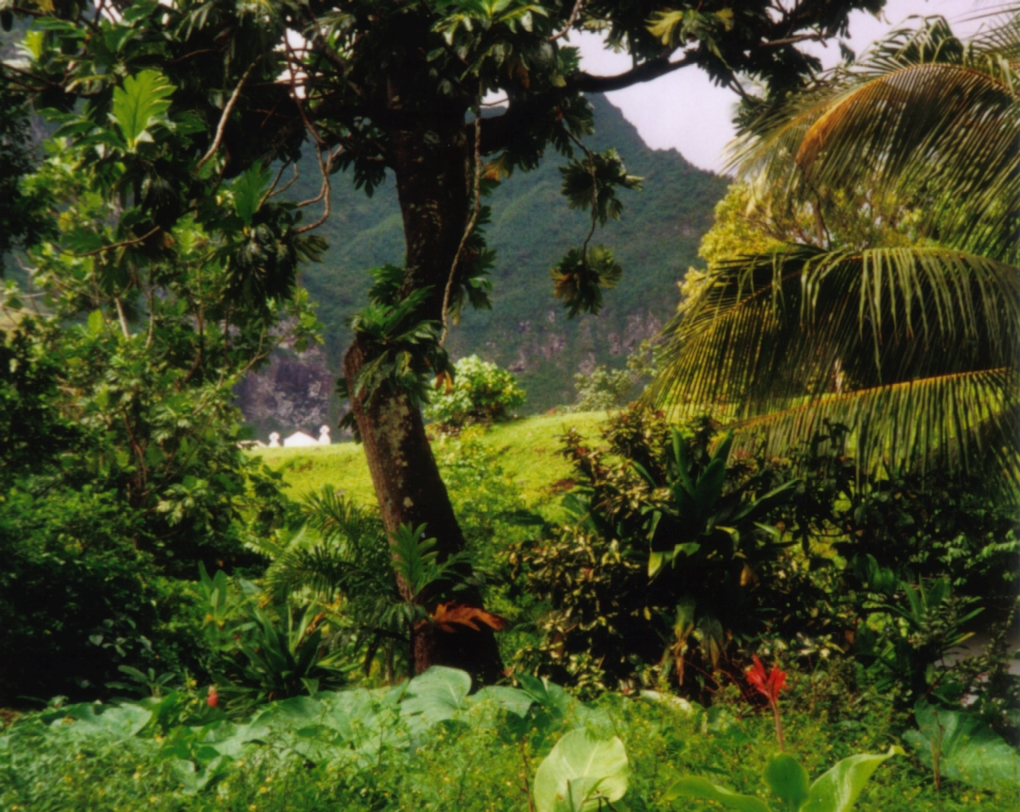
Tropical rainforest, Fatu Hiva Island, Marquesas Islands, French Polynesia

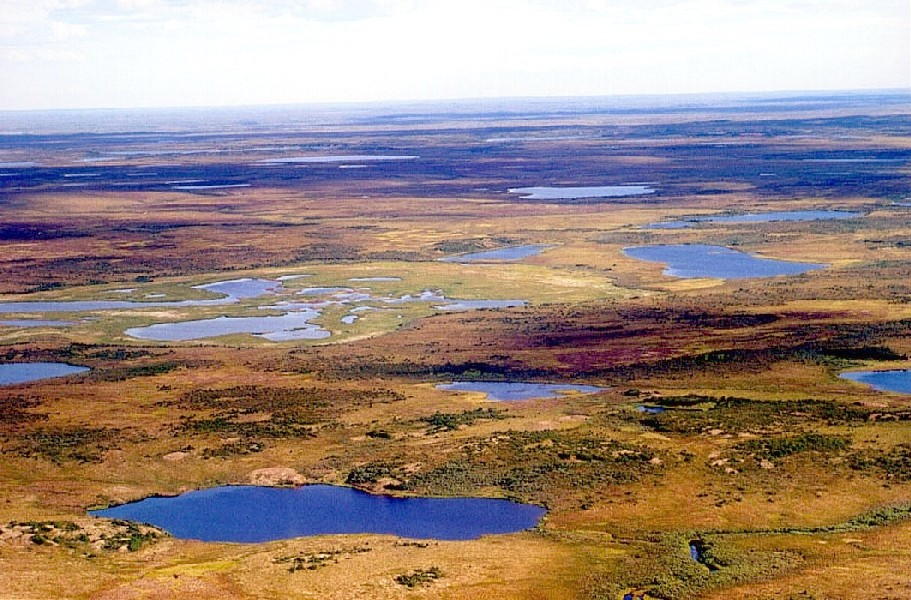
Tundra in Siberia

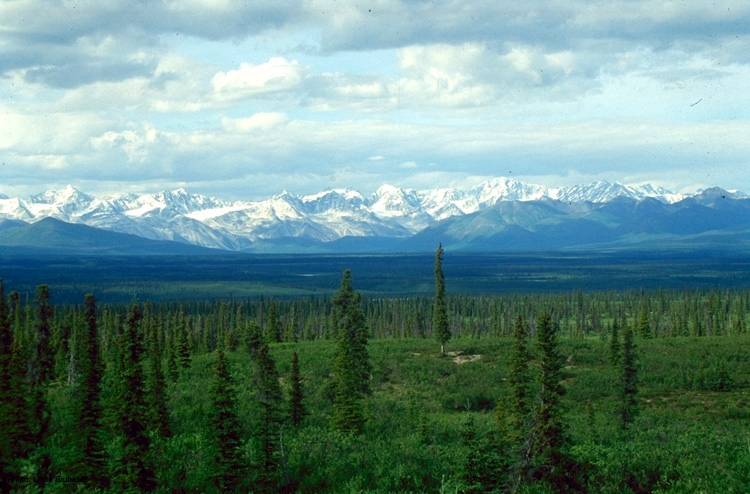
Taiga (), Alaska

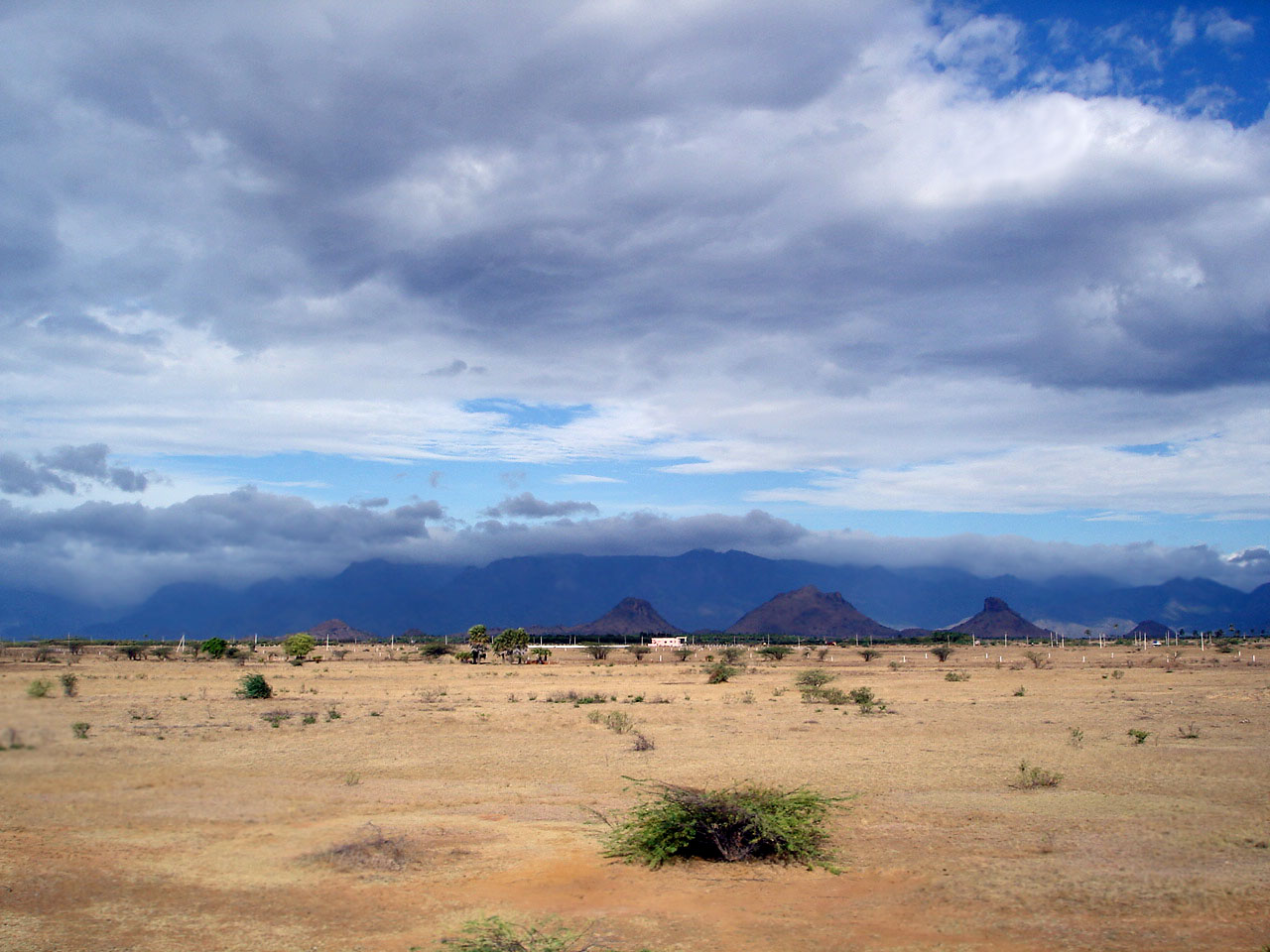
A savanna: the rainshadow region of Tirunelveli, India

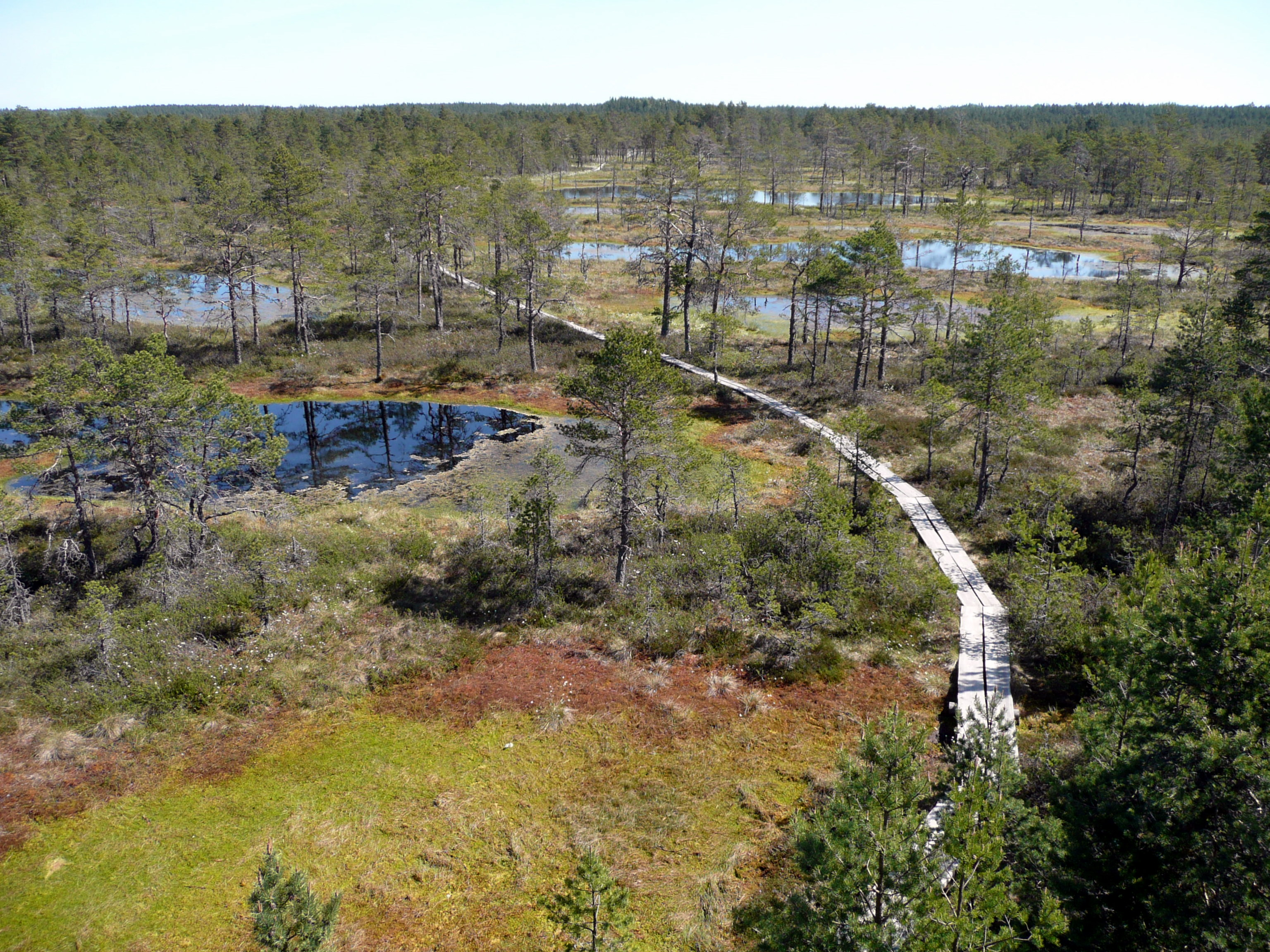
A wetland: Lahemaa National Park in Estonia

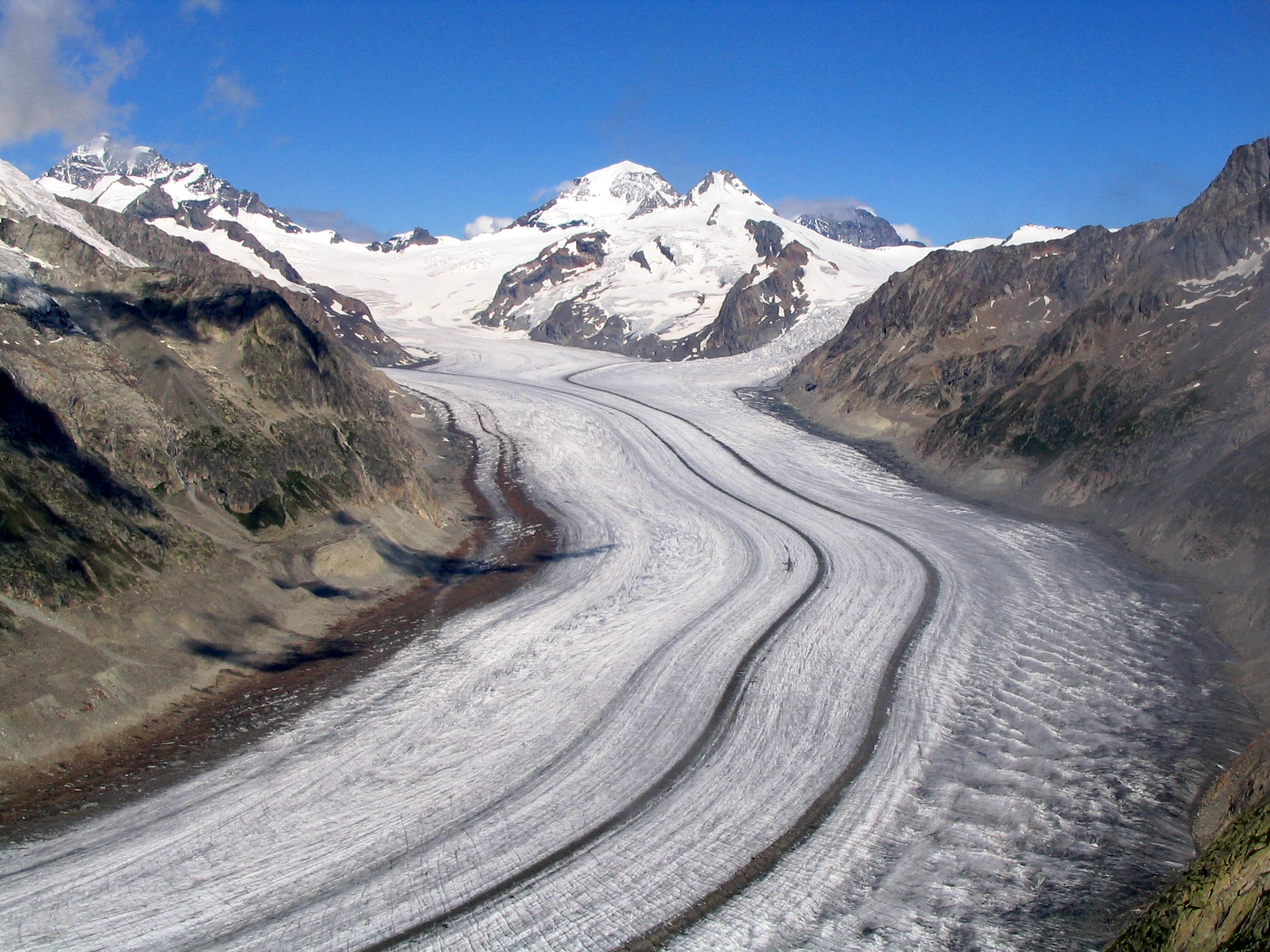
The Aletsch Glacier, the largest glacier in the Swiss Alps

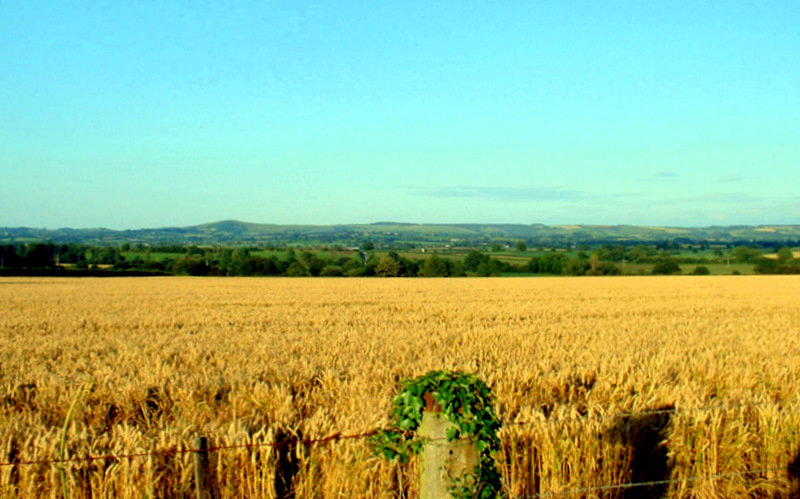
Large fields of modern farmland, Dorset, England

A landscape is the visible features of an area of land, its landforms, and how they integrate with natural or human-made features, often considered in terms of their aesthetic appeal. A landscape includes the physical elements of geophysically defined landforms such as mountains, hills, water bodies such as rivers, lakes, ponds and the sea, living elements of land cover including indigenous vegetation, human elements including different forms of land use, buildings, and structures, and transitory elements such as lighting and weather conditions. Combining both their physical origins and the cultural overlay of human presence, often created over millennia, landscapes reflect a living synthesis of people and place that is vital to local and national identity.

The character of a landscape helps define the self-image of the people who inhabit it and a sense of place that differentiates one region from other regions. It is the dynamic backdrop to people's lives. Landscape can be as varied as farmland, a landscape park or wilderness. The Earth has a vast range of landscapes including the icy landscapes of polar regions, mountainous landscapes, vast arid desert landscapes, islands, and coastal landscapes, densely forested or wooded landscapes including past boreal forests and tropical rainforests and agricultural landscapes of temperate and tropical regions. The activity of modifying the visible features of an area of land is referred to as landscaping.

== Definition and etymology ==
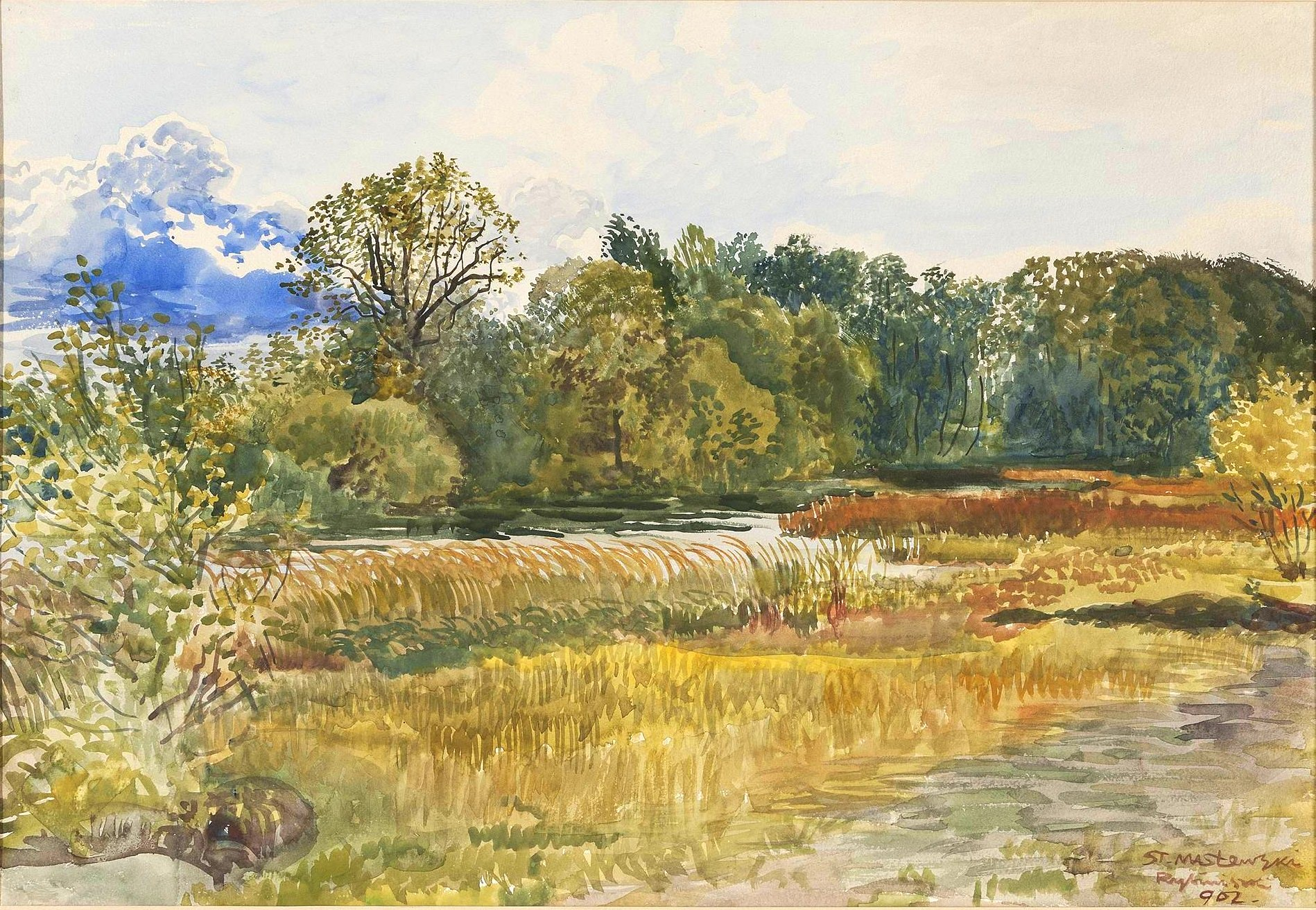
Autumn landscape in Rybiniszki, Latvia, watercolor by Stanisław Masłowski, 1902 (National Museum in Warsaw, Poland)

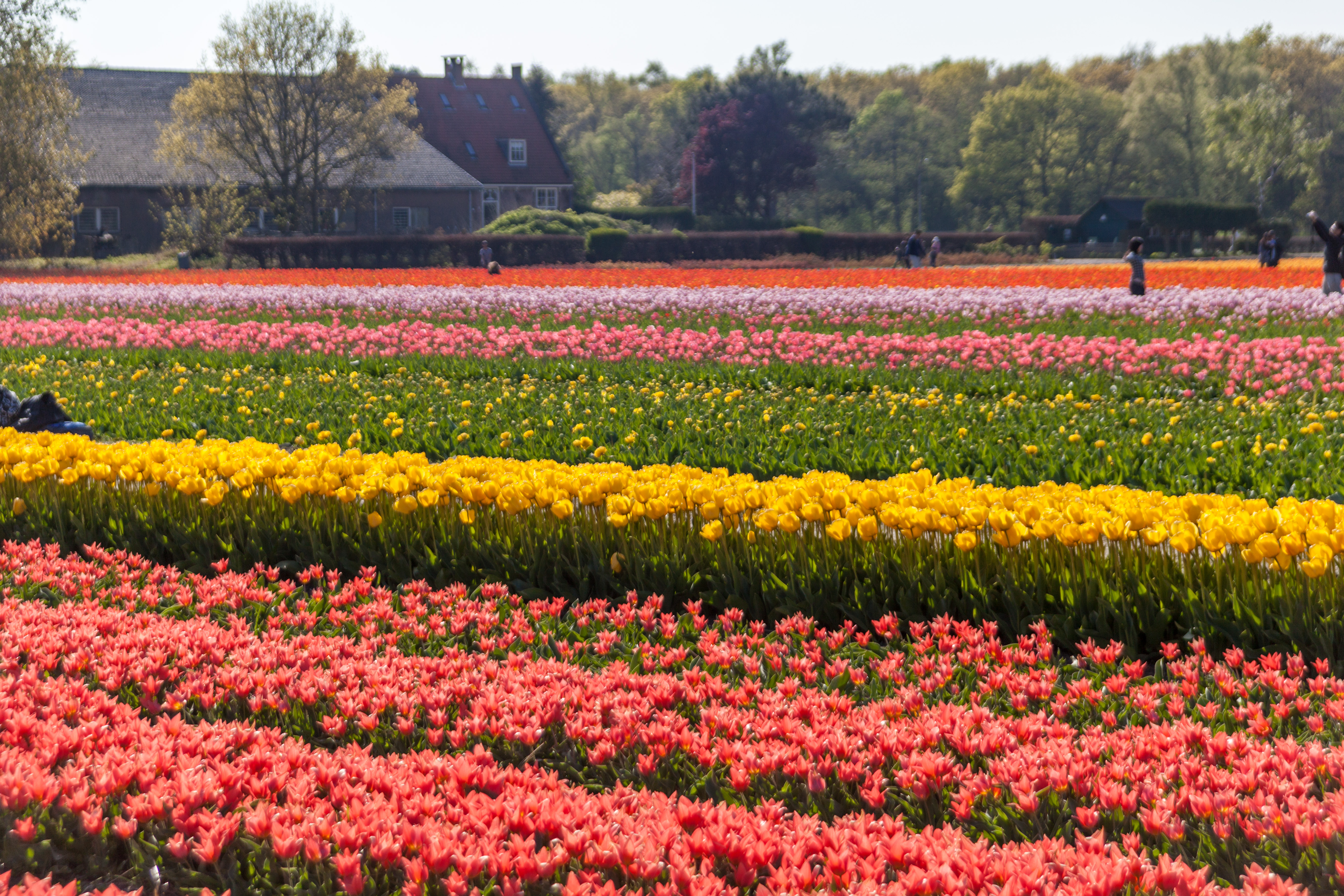
A typical Dutch landscape in South Holland

There are several definitions of what constitutes a landscape, depending on context. In common usage however, a landscape refers either to all the visible features of an area of land (usually rural), often considered in terms of aesthetic appeal, or to a pictorial representation of an area of countryside, specifically within the genre of landscape painting. When people deliberately improve the aesthetic appearance of a piece of land—by changing contours and vegetation, etc.—it is said to have been landscaped, though the result may not constitute a landscape according to some definitions.

Color landscapes blend artificial elements like buildings, roads, and pavements with natural features such as mountains, forests, plants, sky, and rivers. These compositions of distant and near views can significantly impact people's emotions. As urbanization rapidly advances, urban color landscape design has become essential for cities to differentiate and symbolize their unique character and atmosphere. However, this transformation has created challenges. First, the traditional color landscapes in some cities have been heavily influenced by natural geography, climate, local materials, ethnic culture, religion, and socioeconomic factors. Second, the growing problem of "color pollution" - through bright, solid-colored buildings, billboards, and lighting clusters - adversely affects people physically and psychologically. Third, homogenization of colors between cities is causing a loss of cultural identity, as many modern buildings share similar palettes, diluting local characteristics. Researchers have proposed more unified cityscape approaches to address these color landscape issues and help cities preserve their distinctive identities and create vibrant, emotionally engaging urban environments.

The word landscape (landscipe or landscaef) arrived in England—and therefore into the English language—after the fifth century, following the arrival of the Anglo-Saxons; these terms referred to a system of human-made spaces on the land. The term landscape emerged around the turn of the sixteenth century to denote a painting whose primary subject matter was natural scenery. Land (a word from Germanic origin) may be taken in its sense of something to which people belong (as in England being the land of the English). The suffix -scape is equivalent to the more common English suffix -ship. The roots of -ship are etymologically akin to Old English sceppan or scyppan, meaning to shape. The suffix -schaft is related to the verb schaffen, so that -ship and shape are also etymologically linked. The modern form of the word, with its connotations of scenery, appeared in the late sixteenth century when the term landschap was introduced by Dutch painters who used it to refer to paintings of inland natural or rural scenery. The word landscape, first recorded in 1598, was borrowed from a Dutch painters' term. The popular conception of the landscape that is reflected in dictionaries conveys both a particular and a general meaning, the particular referring to an area of the Earth's surface and the general being that which can be seen by an observer. An example of this second usage can be found as early as 1662 in the Book of Common Prayer:

Could we but climb where Moses stood,
And view the landscape over.

(General Hymns, verse 536).

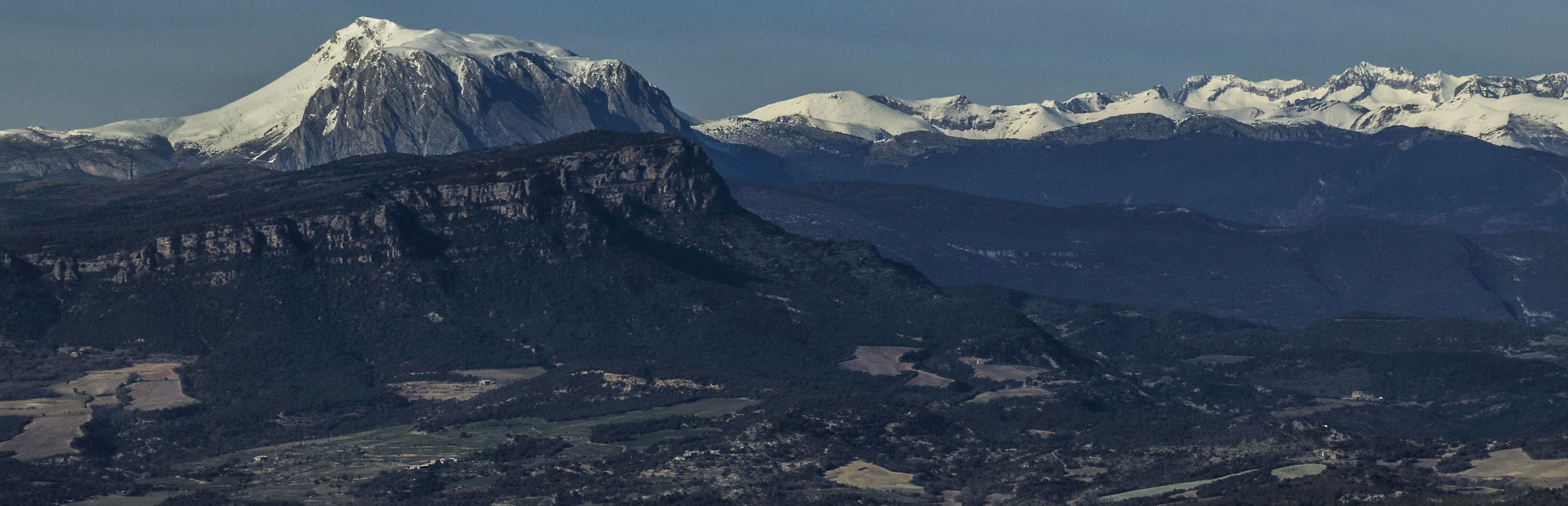
Pre-Pyrenees and Pyrenees

There are several words that are frequently associated with the word landscape:

- Scenery: The natural features of a landscape considered in terms of their appearance, esp. when picturesque: spectacular views of mountain scenery.
- Setting: In works of narrative (especially fictional), it includes the historical moment in time and geographic location in which a story takes place, and helps initiate the main backdrop and mood for a story.
- Picturesque: The word literally means "in the manner of a picture; fit to be made into a picture", and used as early as 1703 (Oxford English Dictionary), and derived from an Italian term pittoresco, "in the manner of a painter". Gilpin's Essay on Prints (1768) defined picturesque as "a term expressive of that peculiar kind of beauty, which is agreeable in a picture" (p. xii).
- A view: "A sight or prospect of some landscape or extended scene; an extent or area covered by the eye from one point" (OED).
- Wilderness: An uncultivated, uninhabited, and inhospitable region. See also Natural landscape.
- Cityscape (also townscape): The urban equivalent of a landscape. In the visual arts a cityscape (urban landscape) is an artistic representation, such as a painting, drawing, print or photograph, of the physical aspects of a city or urban area.
- Seascape: A photograph, painting, or other work of art which depicts the sea, in other words an example of marine art.

== Physical landscape ==
=== Geomorphology: The physical evolution of landscape ===
Geomorphology is the scientific study of the origin and evolution of topographic and bathymetric features created by physical or chemical processes operating at or near Earth's surface. Geomorphologists seek to understand why landscapes look the way they do, to understand landform history and dynamics and to predict changes through a combination of field observations, physical experiments and numerical modeling. Geomorphology is practiced within physical geography, geology, geodesy, engineering geology, archaeology and geotechnical engineering. This broad base of interests contributes to many research styles and interests within the field.

The surface of Earth is modified by a combination of surface processes that sculpt landscapes, and geologic processes that cause tectonic uplift and subsidence, and shape the coastal geography. Surface processes comprise the action of water, wind, ice, fire, and living things on the surface of the Earth, along with chemical reactions that form soils and alter material properties, the stability and rate of change of topography under the force of gravity, and other factors, such as (in the very recent past) human alteration of the landscape. Many of these factors are strongly mediated by climate. Geologic processes include the uplift of mountain ranges, the growth of volcanoes, isostatic changes in land surface elevation (sometimes in response to surface processes), and the formation of deep sedimentary basins where the surface of Earth drops and is filled with material eroded from other parts of the landscape. The Earth surface and its topography therefore are an intersection of climatic, hydrologic, and biologic action with geologic processes.

==== List of different types of landscape ====
Desert, Plain, Taiga, Tundra, Wetland, Mountain, Mountain range, Cliff, Coast, Littoral zone, Glacier, Polar regions of Earth, Shrubland, Forest, Rainforest, Woodland, Jungle, Moors, Steppe, Valley.

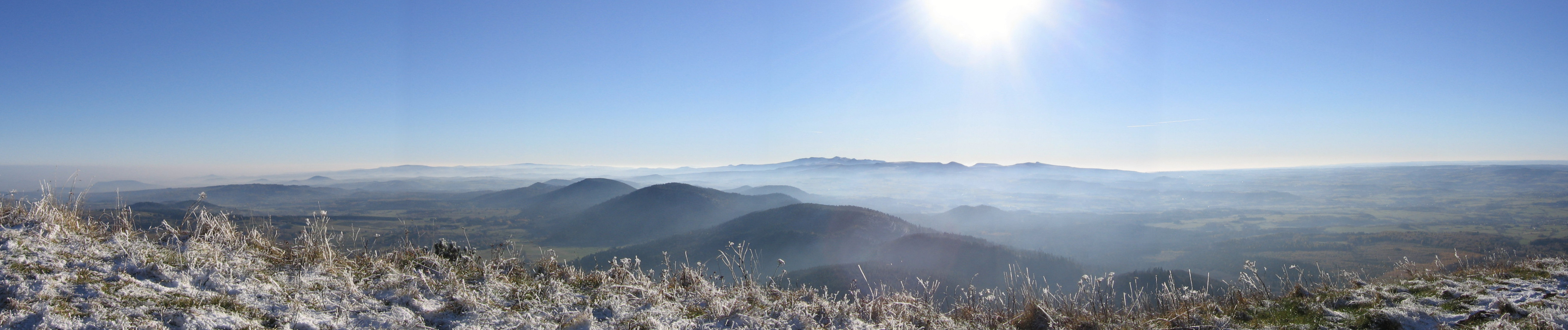
Panorama of the Chaîne des Puys from Puy de Dôme in winter. Massif Central, France. An example of how past volcanic activity shaped a landscape

=== Landscape ecology ===
Landscape ecology is the science of studying and improving relationships between ecological processes in the environment and particular ecosystems. This is done within a variety of landscape scales, development spatial patterns, and organizational levels of research and policy.

Landscape is a central concept in landscape ecology. It is, however, defined in quite different ways. For example: Carl Troll conceives of landscape not as a mental construct but as an objectively given 'organic entity', a harmonic individuum of space. Ernst Neef defines landscapes as sections within the uninterrupted earth-wide interconnection of geofactors which are defined as such on the basis of their uniformity in terms of a specific land use, and are thus defined in an anthropocentric and relativistic way.

According to Richard Forman and Michael Godron, a landscape is a heterogeneous land area composed of a cluster of interacting ecosystems that is repeated in similar form throughout, whereby they list woods, meadows, marshes and villages as examples of a landscape's ecosystems, and state that a landscape is an area at least a few kilometres wide. John A. Wiens opposes the traditional view expounded by Carl Troll, Isaak S. Zonneveld, Zev Naveh, Richard T. T. Forman/Michel Godron and others that landscapes are arenas in which humans interact with their environments on a kilometre-wide scale; instead, he defines 'landscape'—regardless of scale—as "the template on which spatial patterns influence ecological processes". Some define 'landscape' as an area containing two or more ecosystems in close proximity.

=== Landscape science ===
The discipline of landscape science has been described as "bring[ing] landscape ecology and urban ecology together with other disciplines and cross-disciplinary fields to identify patterns and understand social-ecological processes influencing landscape change".

Tokyo Edo Castle, East Garden pond

A 2000 paper entitled "Geography and landscape science" states that "The whole of the disciplines involved in landscape research will be referred to as landscape science, although this term was used first in 1885 by the geographers Oppel and Troll". A 2013 guest editorial defines landscape science as "research that seeks to understand the relationship between people and their environment, with a focus on land use change and data pertaining to land resources at the landscape scale". The Great Soviet Encyclopedia of 1979 defines landscape science as "the branch of physical geography that deals with natural territorial complexes (or geographic complexes, geosystems) as structural parts of the earth's geographic mantle" and states that "The basis of landscape science is the theory that the geographic landscape is the primary element in the physicogeo-graphical differentiation of the earth. Landscape science deals with the origin, structure, and dynamics of landscapes, the laws of the development and arrangement of landscapes, and the transformation of landscapes by the economic activity of man.", and asserts that it was founded in Russia in the early 20th century by L. S. Berg and others, and outside Russia by the German S. Passarge. The conception of landscape as the relationship between various components of natural environments and geochemistry was devoted by soviet scientist Viktor Sochava, based on the ideas of American geographer George Van Dyne.

=== Integrated landscape management ===
Integrated landscape management is a way of managing a landscape that brings together multiple stakeholders, who collaborate to integrate policy and practice for their different land use objectives, with the purpose of achieving sustainable landscapes. It recognises that, for example, one river basin can supply water for towns and agriculture, timber and food crops for smallholders and industry, and habitat for biodiversity; the way in which each one of these sectors pursues its goals can have impacts on the others. The intention is to minimise conflict between these different land use objectives and ecosystem services. This approach draws on landscape ecology, as well as many related fields that also seek to integrate different land uses and users, such as watershed management.

Proponents of integrated landscape management argue that it is well-suited to address complex global challenges, such as those that are the focus of the Sustainable Development Goals. Integrated landscape management is increasingly taken up at the national, local and international level, for example the UN Environment Programme states that "UNEP champions the landscape approach de facto as it embodies the main elements of integrated ecosystem management".

=== Landscape archaeology ===
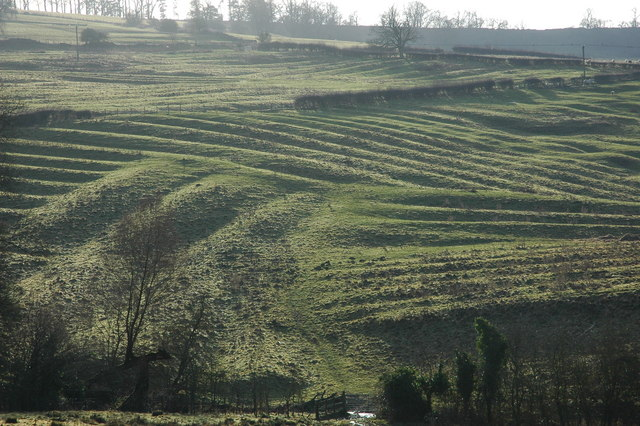
Medieval Ridge and Furrow above Wood Stanway, Gloucestershire, England.

Landscape archaeology or landscape history is the study of the way in which humanity has changed the physical appearance of the environment - both present and past. Landscape generally refers to both natural environments and environments constructed by human beings. Natural landscapes are considered to be environments that have not been altered by humans in any shape or form. Cultural landscapes, on the other hand, are environments that have been altered in some manner by people (including temporary structures and places, such as campsites, that are created by human beings). Among archaeologists, the term landscape can refer to the meanings and alterations people mark onto their surroundings. As such, landscape archaeology is often employed to study the human use of land over extensive periods of time. Landscape archaeology can be summed up by Nicole Branton's statement:

"the landscapes in landscape archaeology may be as small as a single household or garden or as large as an empire", and "although resource exploitation, class, and power are frequent topics of landscape archaeology, landscape approaches are concerned with spatial, not necessarily ecological or economic, relationships. While similar to settlement archaeology and ecological archaeology, landscape approaches model places and spaces as dynamic participants in past behavior, not merely setting (affecting human action), or artifact (affected by human action)".

=== Cultural landscape ===
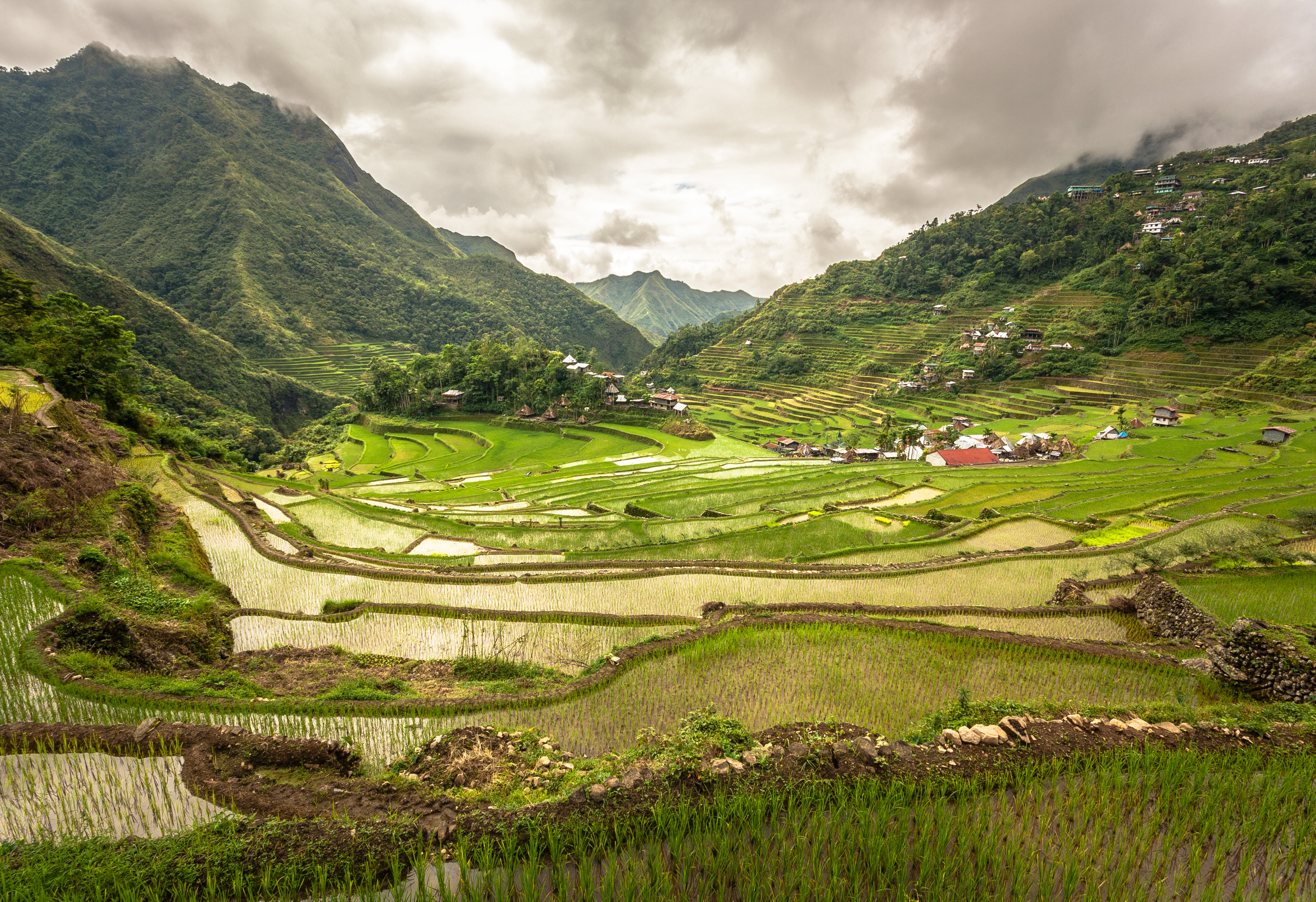
The Batad rice terraces, The Rice Terraces of the Philippine Cordilleras, the first site to be included in the UNESCO World Heritage List cultural landscape category in 1995.

The concept of cultural landscapes can be found in the European tradition of landscape painting. From the 16th century onwards, many European artists painted landscapes in favor of people, diminishing the people in their paintings to figures subsumed within broader, regionally specific landscapes.

The geographer Otto Schlüter is credited with having first formally used "cultural landscape" as an academic term in the early 20th century. In 1908, Schlüter argued that by defining geography as a Landschaftskunde (landscape science) this would give geography a logical subject matter shared by no other discipline. He defined two forms of landscape: the Urlandschaft (transl. original landscape) or landscape that existed before major human induced changes and the Kulturlandschaft (transl. 'cultural landscape') a landscape created by human culture. The major task of geography was to trace the changes in these two landscapes.

It was Carl O. Sauer, a human geographer, who was probably the most influential in promoting and developing the idea of cultural landscapes. Sauer was determined to stress the agency of culture as a force in shaping the visible features of the Earth's surface in delimited areas. Within his definition, the physical environment retains a central significance, as the medium with and through which human cultures act. His classic definition of a 'cultural landscape' reads as follows:

The cultural landscape is fashioned from a natural landscape by a cultural group. Culture is the agent, the natural area is the medium, the cultural landscape is the result.

A cultural landscape, as defined by the World Heritage Committee, is the "cultural properties [that] represent the combined works of nature and of man."

The World Heritage Committee identifies three categories of cultural landscape, ranging from (i) those landscapes most deliberately 'shaped' by people, through (ii) full range of 'combined' works, to (iii) those least evidently 'shaped' by people (yet highly valued). The three categories extracted from the Committee's Operational Guidelines, are as follows:

1. "A landscape designed and created intentionally by man";
2. an "organically evolved landscape" which may be a "relict (or fossil) landscape" or a "continuing landscape"; and
3. an "associative cultural landscape" which may be valued because of the "religious, artistic or cultural associations of the natural element".

== Human conceptions and representations of landscape ==
=== Landscape gardens ===
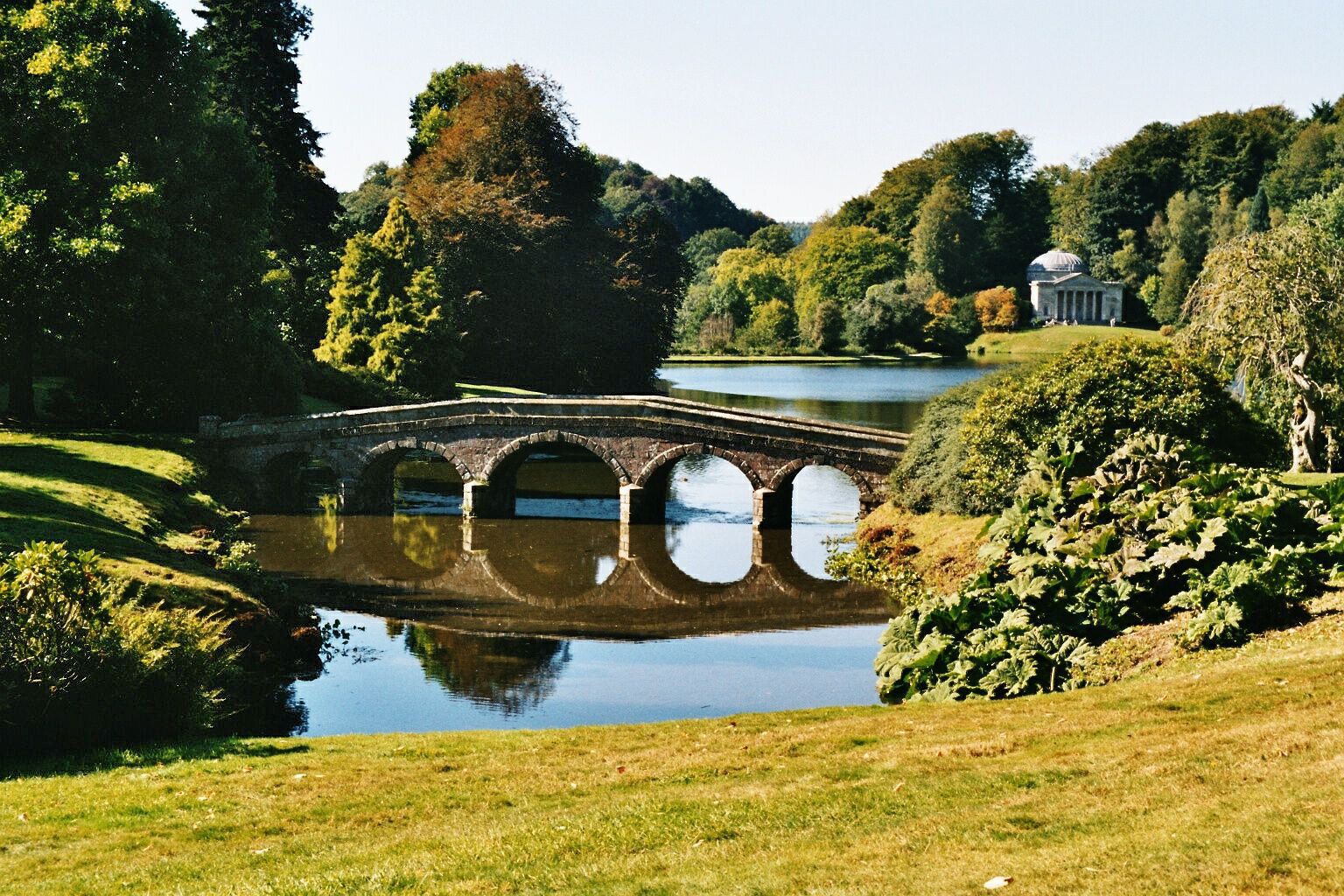
Stourhead garden, Wiltshire, England

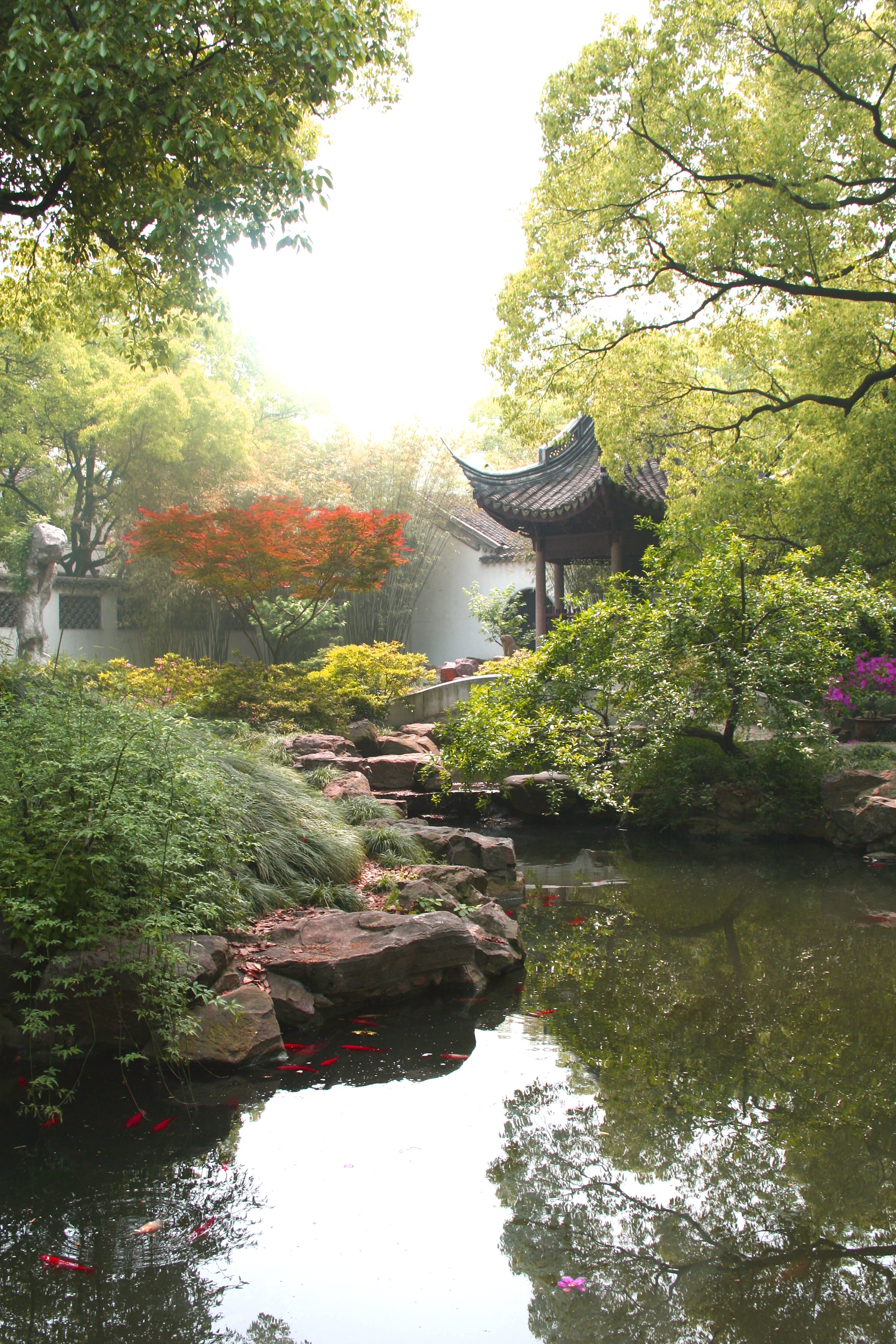
Jichang Garden in Wuxi (1506–1521)

The Chinese garden is a landscape garden style which has evolved over three thousand years. It includes both the vast gardens of the Chinese emperors and members of the Imperial Family, built for pleasure and to impress, and the more intimate gardens created by scholars, poets, former government officials, soldiers and merchants, made for reflection and escape from the outside world. They create an idealized miniature landscape, which is meant to express the harmony that should exist between man and nature. A typical Chinese garden is enclosed by walls and includes one or more ponds, scholar's rocks, trees and flowers, and an assortment of halls and pavilions within the garden, connected by winding paths and zig-zag galleries. By moving from structure to structure, visitors can view a series of carefully composed scenes, unrolling like a scroll of landscape paintings.

The English landscape garden, also called English landscape park or simply the 'English garden', is a style of parkland garden intended to look as though it might be a natural landscape, although it may be very extensively re-arranged. It emerged in England in the early 18th century, and spread across Europe, replacing the more formal, symmetrical jardin à la française of the 17th century as the principal style for large parks and gardens in Europe. The English garden (and later French landscape garden) presented an idealized view of nature. It drew inspiration from paintings of landscapes by Claude Lorrain and Nicolas Poussin, and from the classic Chinese gardens of the East, which had recently been described by European travellers and were realized in the Anglo-Chinese garden, and the philosophy of Jean-Jacques Rousseau (1712 – 1778).

The English garden usually included a lake, sweeps of gently rolling lawns set against groves of trees, and recreations of classical temples, Gothic ruins, bridges, and other picturesque architecture, designed to recreate an idyllic pastoral landscape. The work of Lancelot "Capability" Brown and Humphry Repton was particularly influential. By the end of the 18th century the English garden was being imitated by the French landscape garden, and as far away as St. Petersburg, Russia, in Pavlovsk, the gardens of the future Emperor Paul. It also had a major influence on the form of the public parks and gardens which appeared around the world in the 19th century.

=== Landscape architecture ===
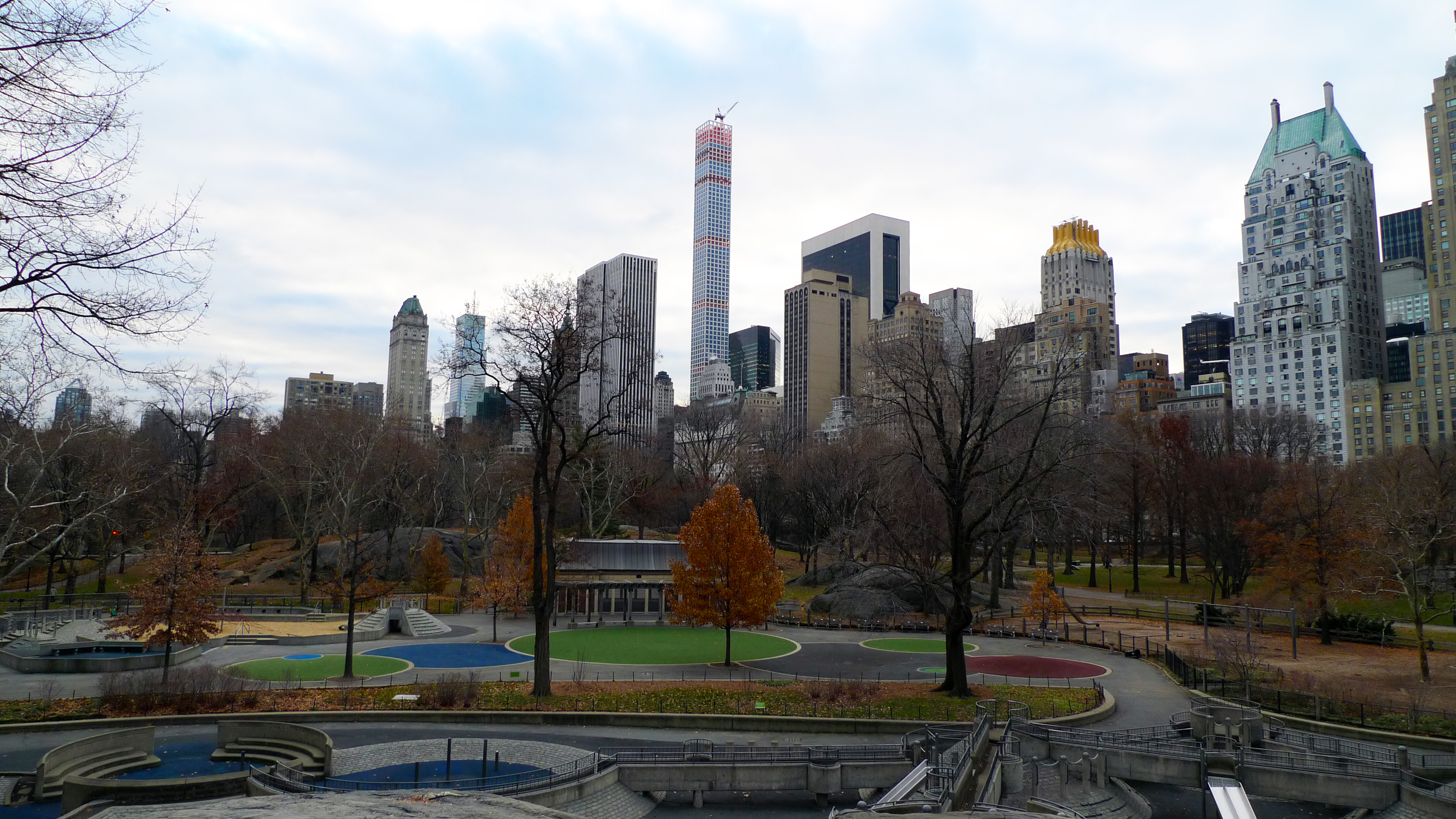
Central Park, New York City, US, designed by Frederick Law Olmsted.

Landscape architecture is a multi-disciplinary field, incorporating aspects of botany, horticulture, the fine arts, architecture, industrial design, geology and the earth sciences, environmental psychology, geography, and ecology. The activities of a landscape architect can range from the creation of public parks and parkways to site planning for campuses and corporate office parks, from the design of residential estates to the design of civil infrastructure and the management of large wilderness areas or reclamation of degraded landscapes such as mines or landfills. Landscape architects work on all types of structures and external space – large or small, urban, suburban and rural, and with "hard" (built) and "soft" (planted) materials, while paying attention to ecological sustainability.

For the period before 1800, the history of landscape gardening (later called landscape architecture) is largely that of master planning and garden design for manor houses, palaces and royal properties, religious complexes, and centers of government. An example is the extensive work by André Le Nôtre at Vaux-le-Vicomte and at the Palace of Versailles for King Louis XIV of France. The first person to write of making a landscape was Joseph Addison in 1712. The term landscape architecture was invented by Gilbert Laing Meason in 1828 and was first used as a professional title by Frederick Law Olmsted in 1863. During the latter 19th century, the term landscape architect became used by professional people who designed landscapes. Frederick Law Olmsted used the term 'landscape architecture' as a profession for the first time when designing Central Park, New York City, US. Here the combination of traditional landscape gardening and the emerging field of city planning gave landscape architecture its unique focus. This use of the term landscape architect became established after Frederick Law Olmsted Jr. and others founded the American Society of Landscape Architects (ASLA) in 1899.

=== Landscape and literature ===
==== The earliest landscape literature ====
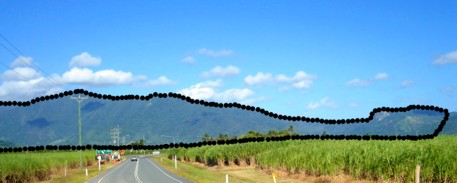
The Djabugay language group's mythical being, Damarri, transformed into a mountain range, is seen lying on his back above the Barron River Gorge, looking upwards to the skies, within north-east Australia's wet tropical forested landscape

Possibly the earliest landscape literature is found in Australian aboriginal myths (also known as Dreamtime or Dreaming stories, songlines, or Aboriginal oral literature), the stories traditionally performed by Aboriginal peoples within each of the language groups across Australia. All such myths variously tell significant truths within each Aboriginal group's local landscape. They effectively layer the whole of the Australian continent's topography with cultural nuance and deeper meaning, and empower selected audiences with the accumulated wisdom and knowledge of Australian Aboriginal ancestors back to time immemorial.

In the West pastoral poetry represent the earliest form of landscape literature, though this literary genre presents an idealized landscape peopled by shepherds and shepherdesses, and creates "an image of a peaceful uncorrupted existence; a kind of prelapsarian world". The pastoral has its origins in the works of the Greek poet Theocritus (c. 316 - c. 260 BC). The Romantic period poet William Wordsworth created a modern, more realistic form of pastoral with Michael, A Pastoral Poem (1800).

An early form of landscape poetry, Shanshui poetry, developed in China during the third and fourth centuries A.D.

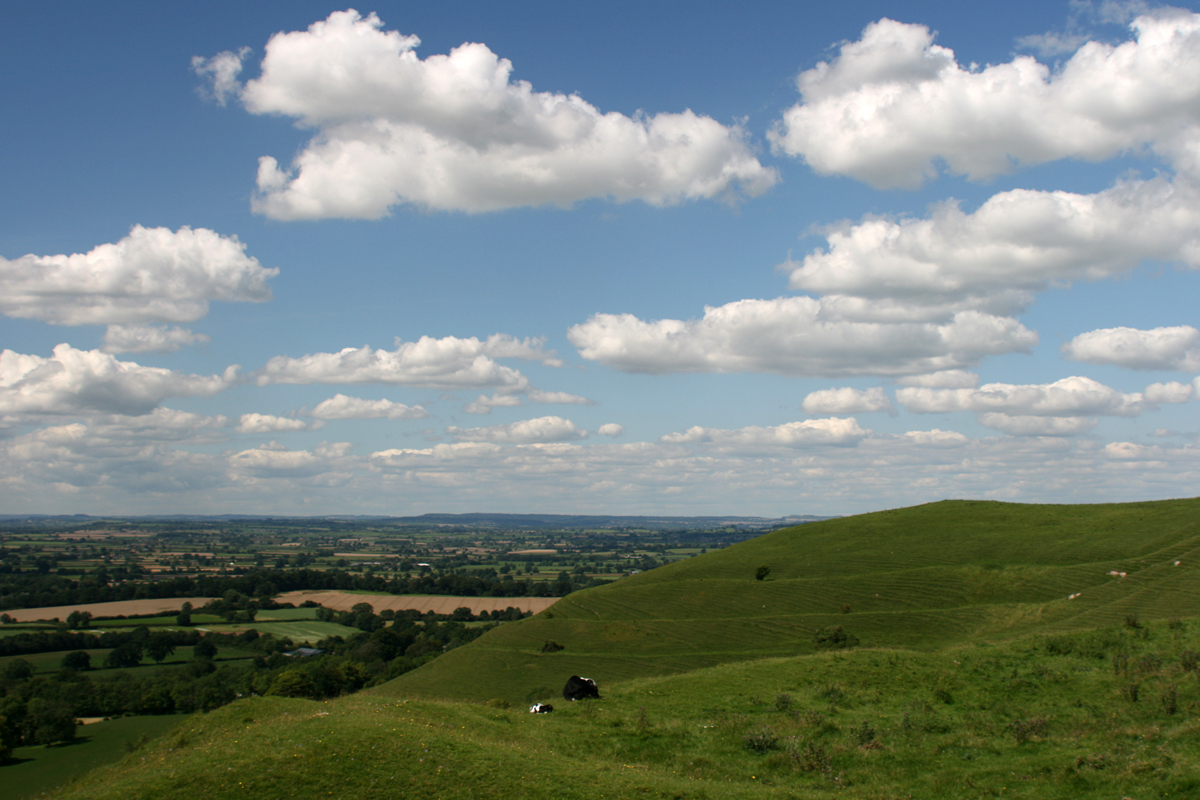
The Vale of Blackmore, the main setting for Thomas Hardy's novel Tess of the d'Urbervilles. Hambledon Hill towards Stourton Tower

==== Topographical poetry ====
Topographical poetry is a genre of poetry that describes, and often praises, a landscape or place. John Denham's 1642 poem "Cooper's Hill" established the genre, which peaked in popularity in 18th-century England. Examples of topographical verse date, however, to the Late Classical period, and can be found throughout the Medieval era and during the Renaissance. Though the earliest examples come mostly from continental Europe, the topographical poetry in the tradition originating with Denham concerns itself with the classics, and many of the various types of topographical verse, such as river, ruin, or hilltop poems were established by the early 17th century. Alexander Pope's "Windsor Forest" (1713) and John Dyer's "Grongar Hill' (1762) are two other familiar examples. George Crabbe, the Suffolk regional poet, also wrote topographical poems, as did William Wordsworth, of which Lines written a few miles above Tintern Abbey is an obvious example. More recently, Matthew Arnold's "The Scholar Gipsy" (1853) praises the Oxfordshire countryside, and W. H. Auden's "In Praise of Limestone" (1948) uses a limestone landscape as an allegory.

Subgenres of topographical poetry include the country house poem, written in 17th-century England to compliment a wealthy patron, and the prospect poem, describing the view from a distance or a temporal view into the future, with the sense of opportunity or expectation. When understood broadly as landscape poetry and when assessed from its establishment to the present, topographical poetry can take on many formal situations and types of places. Kenneth Baker, in his "Introduction to The Faber Book of Landscape Poetry, identifies 37 varieties and compiles poems from the 16th through the 20th centuries—from Edmund Spenser to Sylvia Plath—correspondent to each type, from "Walks and Surveys", to "Mountains, Hills, and the View from Above", to "Violation of Nature and the Landscape", to "Spirits and Ghosts."

Common aesthetic registers of which topographical poetry makes use include pastoral imagery, the sublime, and the picturesque, which include images of rivers, ruins, moonlight, birdsong, and clouds, peasants, mountains, caves, and waterscapes.

Though describing a landscape or scenery, topographical poetry often, at least implicitly, addresses a political issue or the meaning of nationality in some way. The description of the landscape therefore becomes a poetic vehicle for a political message. For example, in John Denham's "Cooper's Hill", the speaker discusses the merits of the recently executed Charles I.

==== The Romantic era in Britain ====
The Vision on Mount Snowdon

.................................and on the shore
I found myself of a huge sea of mist,
Which meek and silent rested at my feet.
A hundred hills their dusky backs upheaved
All over this still ocean, and beyond,
Far, far beyond, the vapours shot themselves
In headlands, tongues, and promontory shapes, Into the sea, the real sea, that seemed
To dwindle and give up its majesty,
Usurped upon as far as sight could reach.

— from The Prelude (1805), Book 13, lines 41-51.
by William Wordsworth

One important aspect of British Romanticism – evident in painting and literature as well as in politics and philosophy – was a change in the way people perceived and valued the landscape. In particular, after William Gilpin's Observations on the River Wye was published in 1770, the idea of the picturesque began to influence artists and viewers. Gilpin advocated approaching the landscape "by the rules of picturesque beauty," which emphasized contrast and variety. Edmund Burke's A Philosophical Enquiry into the Origin of Our Ideas of the Sublime and Beautiful (1757) was also an influential text, as was Longinus' On the Sublime (early A.D., Greece), which was translated into English from the French in 1739. From the 18th century, a taste for the sublime in the natural landscape emerged alongside the idea of the sublime in language; that is elevated rhetoric or speech. A topographical poem that influenced the Romantics, was James Thomson's The Seasons (1726–30). The changing landscape, brought about by the industrial and agricultural revolutions, with the expansion of the city and depopulation of the countryside, was another influences on the growth of the Romantic movement in Britain. The poor condition of workers, the new class conflicts, and the pollution of the environment all led to a reaction against urbanism and industrialisation and a new emphasis on the beauty and value of nature and landscape. However, it was also a revolt against aristocratic social and political norms of the Age of Enlightenment, as well a reaction against the scientific rationalisation of nature.

The poet William Wordsworth was a major contributor to the literature of landscape, as was his contemporary poet and novelist Walter Scott. Scott's influence was felt throughout Europe, as well as on major Victorian novelists in Britain, such as Emily Brontë, Mrs Gaskell, George Eliot, and Thomas Hardy, as well as John Cowper Powys in the 20th-century. Margaret Drabble in A Writer's Britain suggests that Thomas Hardy "is perhaps the greatest writer of rural life and landscape" in English.

==== Europe ====
Among European writers influenced by Scott were Frenchmen Honoré de Balzac and Alexandre Dumas and Italian Alessandro Manzoni. Manzoni's famous novel The Betrothed was inspired by Walter Scott's Ivanhoe.

==== North America ====
Also influenced by Romanticism's approach to landscape was the American novelist Fenimore Cooper, who was admired by Victor Hugo and Balzac and characterized as the "American Scott."

==== China ====
Landscape in Chinese poetry has often been closely tied to Chinese landscape painting, which developed much earlier than in the West. Many poems evoke specific paintings, and some are written in more empty areas of the scroll itself. Many painters also wrote poetry, especially in the scholar-official or literati tradition. Landscape images were present in the early Shijing and the Chuci, but in later poetry the emphasis changed, as in painting to the Shan shui (Chinese: 山水 lit. "mountain-water") style featuring wild mountains, rivers and lakes, rather than landscape as a setting for a human presence. Shanshui poetry traditional Chinese: 山水詩; simplified Chinese: 山水诗 developed in China during the third and fourth centuries AD and left most of the varied landscapes of China largely unrepresented. Shan shui painting and poetry shows imaginary landscapes, though with features typical of some parts of South China; they remain popular to the present day.

Fields and Gardens poetry (simplified Chinese: 田园诗; traditional Chinese: 田園詩; pinyin: tiányuán shī; Wade–Giles: t'ien-yuan-shih; lit. 'fields and gardens poetry'), in poetry was a contrasting poetic movement which lasted for centuries, with a focused on the nature found in gardens, in backyards, and in the cultivated countryside. Fields and Gardens poetry is one of many Classical Chinese poetry genres. One of the main practitioners of the Fields and Gardens poetry genre was Tao Yuanming (also known as Tao Qian (365–427), among other names or versions of names). Tao Yuanming has been regarded as the first great poet associated with the Fields and Gardens poetry genre.

=== Landscape art ===
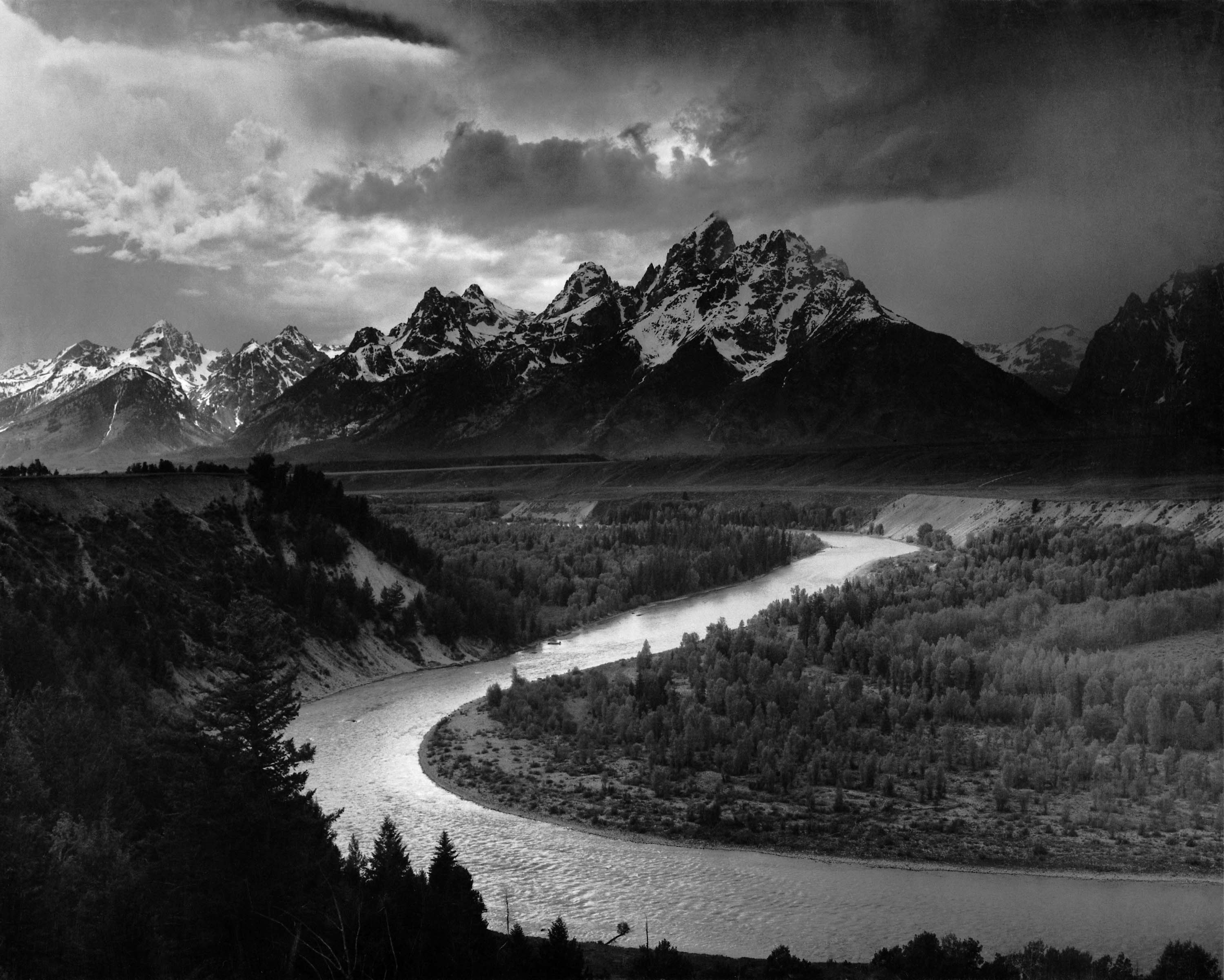
The Tetons and the Snake River (1942) photograph by Ansel Adams

==== Landscape photography ====
Many landscape photographs show little or no human activity and are created in the pursuit of a pure, unsullied depiction of nature devoid of human influence, instead featuring subjects such as strongly defined landforms, weather, and ambient light. As with most forms of art, the definition of a landscape photograph is broad, and may include urban settings, industrial areas, and nature photography. Notable landscape photographers include Ansel Adams, Galen Rowell, Edward Weston, Ben Heine, Mark Gray and Fred Judge.

==== Landscape painting ====
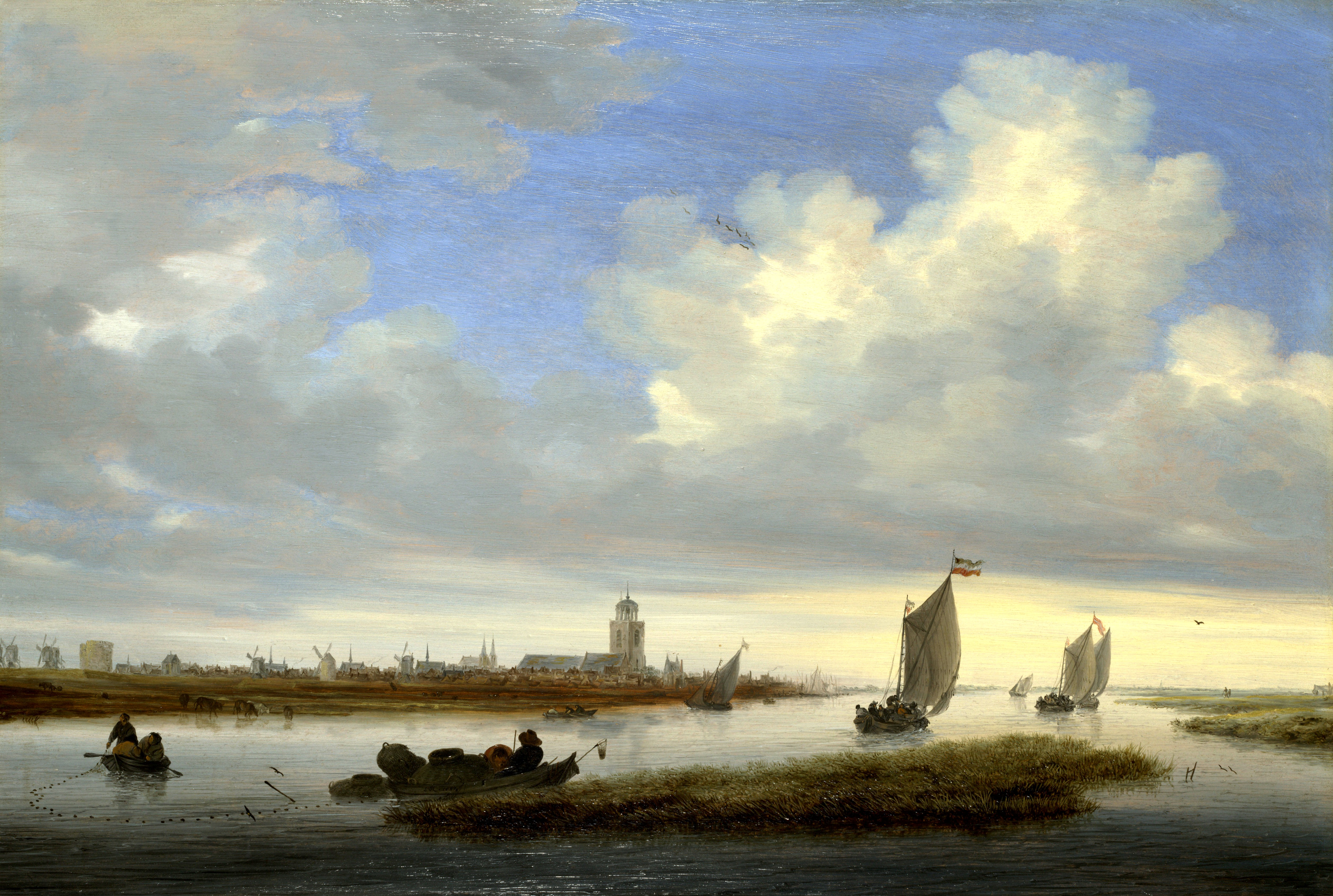
Salomon van Ruisdael, "View of Deventer" (1657).

The earliest forms of art around the world depict little that could really be called landscape, although ground-lines and sometimes indications of mountains, trees or other natural features are included. The earliest "pure landscapes" with no human figures are frescos from Minoan Greece of around 1500 BCE. Hunting scenes, especially those set in the enclosed vista of the reed beds of the Nile Delta from Ancient Egypt, can give a strong sense of place, but the emphasis is on individual plant forms and human and animal figures rather than the overall landscape setting. For a coherent depiction of a whole landscape, some rough system of perspective, or scaling for distance, is needed, and this seems from literary evidence to have first been developed in Ancient Greece in the Hellenistic period, although no large-scale examples survive. More ancient Roman landscapes survive, from the 1st century BCE onwards, especially frescos of landscapes decorating rooms that have been preserved at archaeological sites of Pompeii, Herculaneum and elsewhere, and mosaics.

The Chinese ink painting tradition of shan shui ("mountain-water"), or "pure" landscape, in which the only sign of human life is usually a sage, or a glimpse of his hut, uses sophisticated landscape backgrounds to figure subjects, and landscape art of this period retains a classic and much-imitated status within the Chinese tradition.

Both the Roman and Chinese traditions typically show grand panoramas of imaginary landscapes, generally backed with a range of spectacular mountains – in China often with waterfalls and in Rome often including sea, lakes or rivers. These were frequently used to bridge the gap between a foreground scene with figures and a distant panoramic vista, a persistent problem for landscape artists.

A major contrast between landscape painting in the West and East Asia has been that while in the West until the 19th century it occupied a low position in the accepted hierarchy of genres, in East Asia the classic Chinese mountain-water ink painting was traditionally the most prestigious form of visual art. However, in the West, history painting came to require an extensive landscape background where appropriate, so the theory did not entirely work against the development of landscape painting – for several centuries landscapes were regularly promoted to the status of history painting by the addition of small figures to make a narrative scene, typically religious or mythological.

Dutch Golden Age painting of the 17th century saw the dramatic growth of landscape painting, in which many artists specialized, and the development of extremely subtle realist techniques for depicting light and weather. The popularity of landscapes in the Netherlands was in part a reflection of the virtual disappearance of religious painting in a Calvinist society, and the decline of religious painting in the 18th and 19th centuries all over Europe combined with Romanticism to give landscapes a much greater and more prestigious place in 19th-century art than they had assumed before.

In England, landscapes had initially been mostly backgrounds to portraits, typically suggesting the parks or estates of a landowner, though mostly painted in London by an artist who had never visited the site. The English tradition was founded by Anthony van Dyck and other, mostly Flemish, artists working in England. By the beginning of the 19th century the English artists with the highest modern reputations were mostly dedicated landscapists, showing the wide range of Romantic interpretations of the English landscape found in the works of John Constable, J. M. W. Turner and Samuel Palmer. However all these had difficulty establishing themselves in the contemporary art market, which still preferred history paintings and portraits.

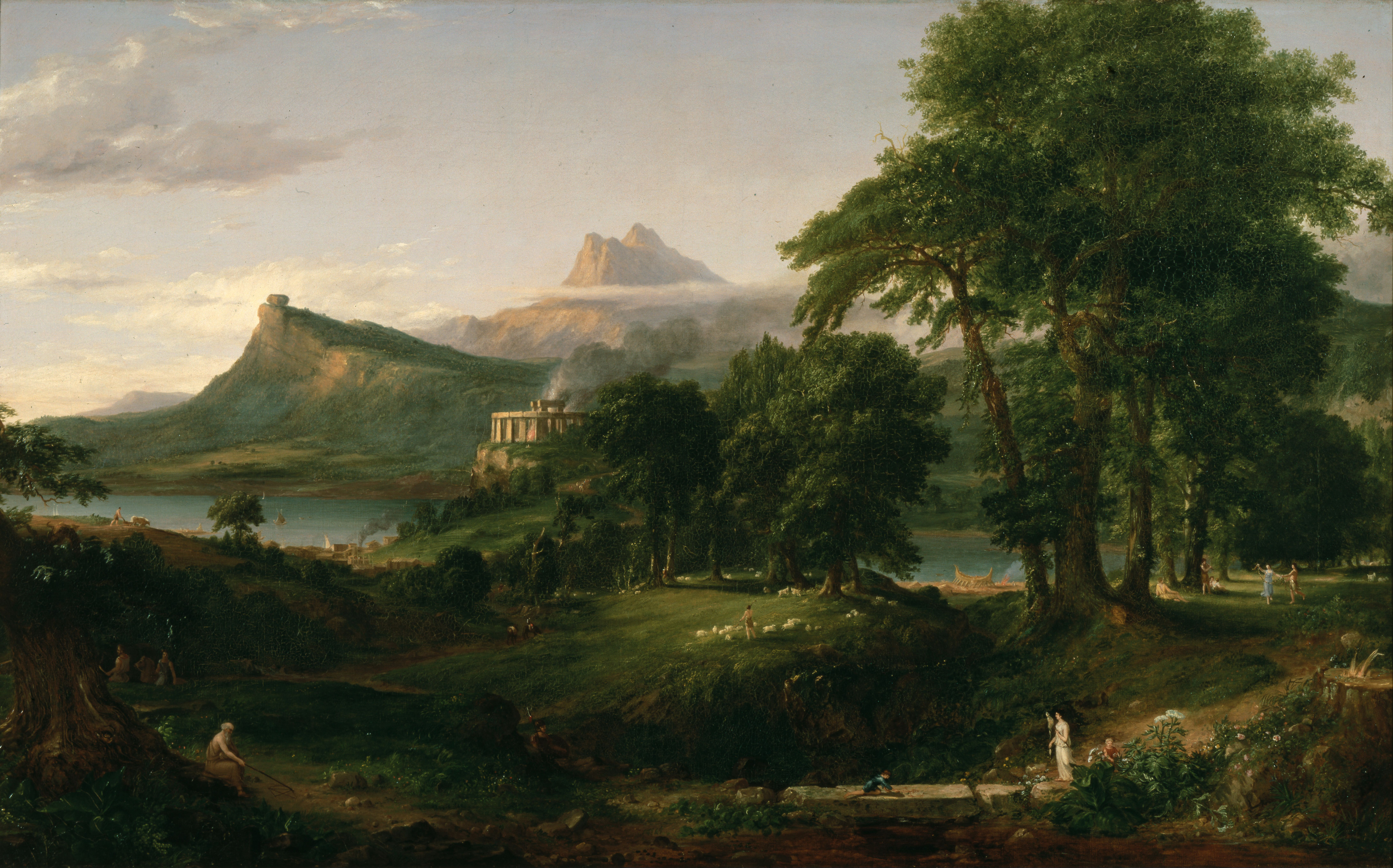
Thomas Cole "The Course of Empire The Arcadian or Pastoral State", US, 1836.

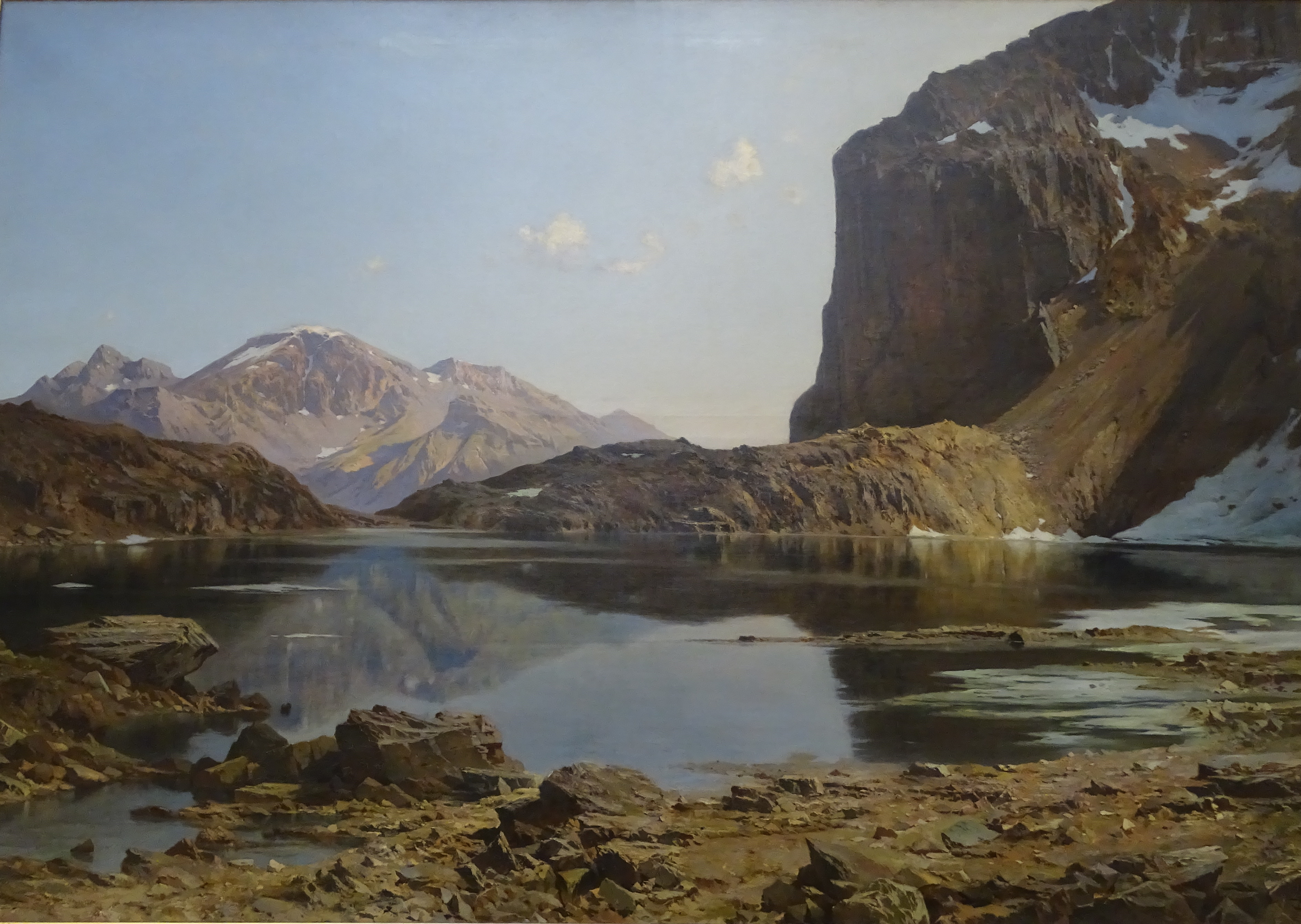
Laurent Guétal, Lac de l'Eychauda, France, 1886, Museum of Grenoble.

In Europe, as John Ruskin said, and Sir Kenneth Clark confirmed, landscape painting was the "chief artistic creation of the nineteenth century", and "the dominant art", with the result that in the following period people were "apt to assume that the appreciation of natural beauty and the painting of landscape is a normal and enduring part of our spiritual activity"

The Romantic movement intensified the existing interest in landscape art, and remote and wild landscapes, which had been one recurring element in earlier landscape art, now became more prominent. The German Caspar David Friedrich had a distinctive style, influenced by his Danish training. To this he added a quasi-mystical Romanticism. French painters were slower to develop landscape painting, but from about the 1830s Jean-Baptiste-Camille Corot and other painters in the Barbizon School established a French landscape tradition that would become the most influential in Europe for a century, with the Impressionists and Post-Impressionists for the first time making landscape painting the main source of general stylistic innovation across all types of painting.

In the United States, the Hudson River School, prominent in the middle to late 19th century, is probably the best-known native development in landscape art. These painters created works of mammoth scale that attempted to capture the epic scope of the landscapes that inspired them. The work of Thomas Cole, the school's generally acknowledged founder, has much in common with the philosophical ideals of European landscape paintings — a kind of secular faith in the spiritual benefits to be gained from the contemplation of natural beauty. Some of the later Hudson River School artists, such as Albert Bierstadt, created less comforting works that placed a greater emphasis (with a great deal of Romantic exaggeration) on the raw, even terrifying power of nature. The best examples of Canadian landscape art can be found in the works of the Group of Seven, prominent in the 1920s. Emily Carr was also closely associated with the Group of Seven, though was never an official member. Although certainly less dominant in the period after World War I, many significant artists still painted landscapes in the wide variety of styles exemplified by Neil Welliver, Alex Katz, Milton Avery, Peter Doig, Andrew Wyeth, David Hockney and Sidney Nolan.

The term neo-romanticism is applied in British art history, to a loosely affiliated school of landscape painting that emerged around 1930 and continued until the early 1950s. These painters looked back to 19th-century artists such as William Blake and Samuel Palmer, but were also influenced by French cubist and post-cubist artists such as Pablo Picasso, André Masson, and Pavel Tchelitchew. This movement was motivated in part as a response to the threat of invasion during World War II. Artists particularly associated with the initiation of this movement included Paul Nash, John Piper, Henry Moore, Ivon Hitchens, and especially Graham Sutherland. A younger generation included John Minton, Michael Ayrton, John Craxton, Keith Vaughan, Robert Colquhoun, and Robert MacBryde.

== Gallery of landscape paintings from different periods ==
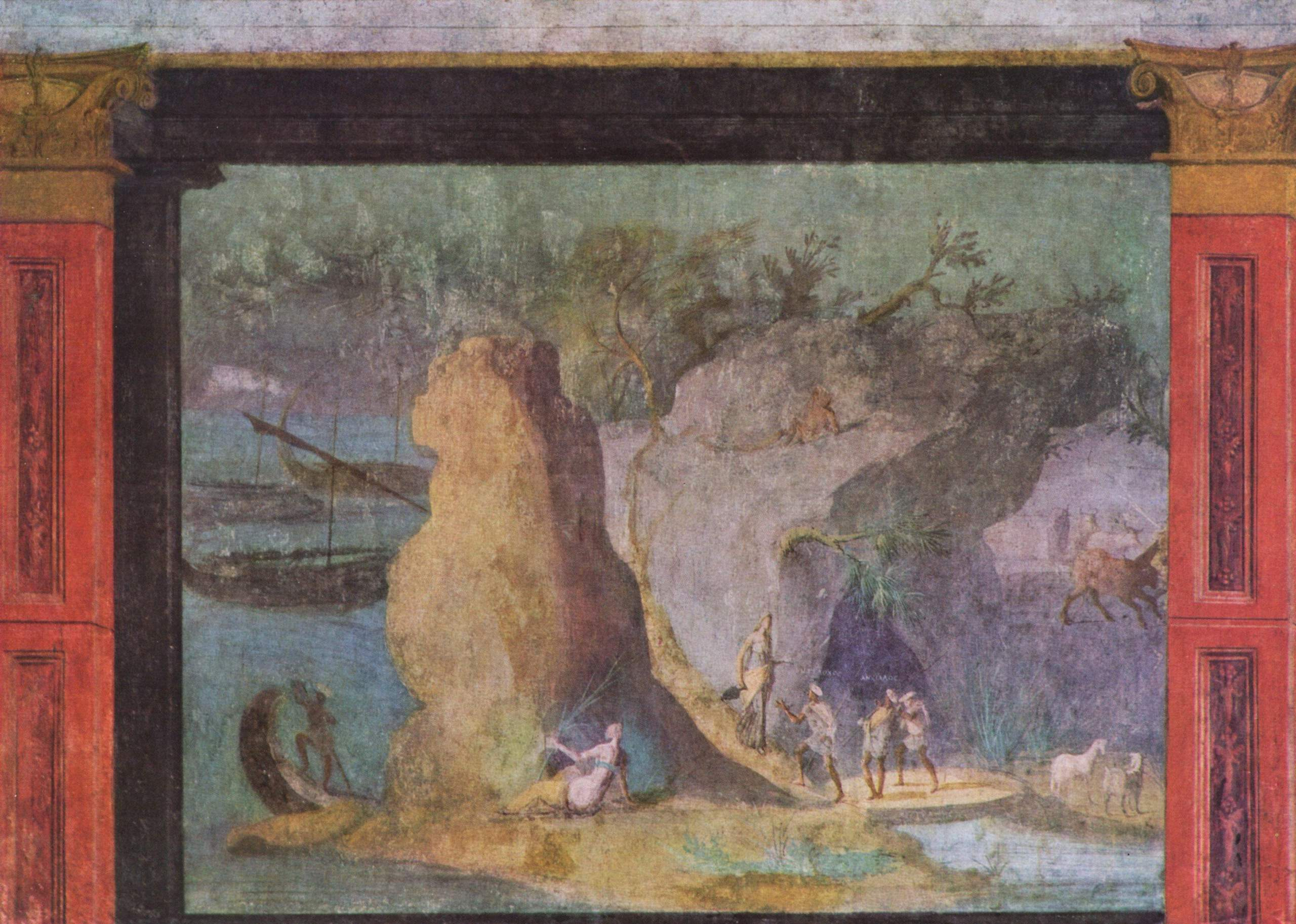
Landscape with scene from the Odyssey, Rome, c. 60-40 BC.

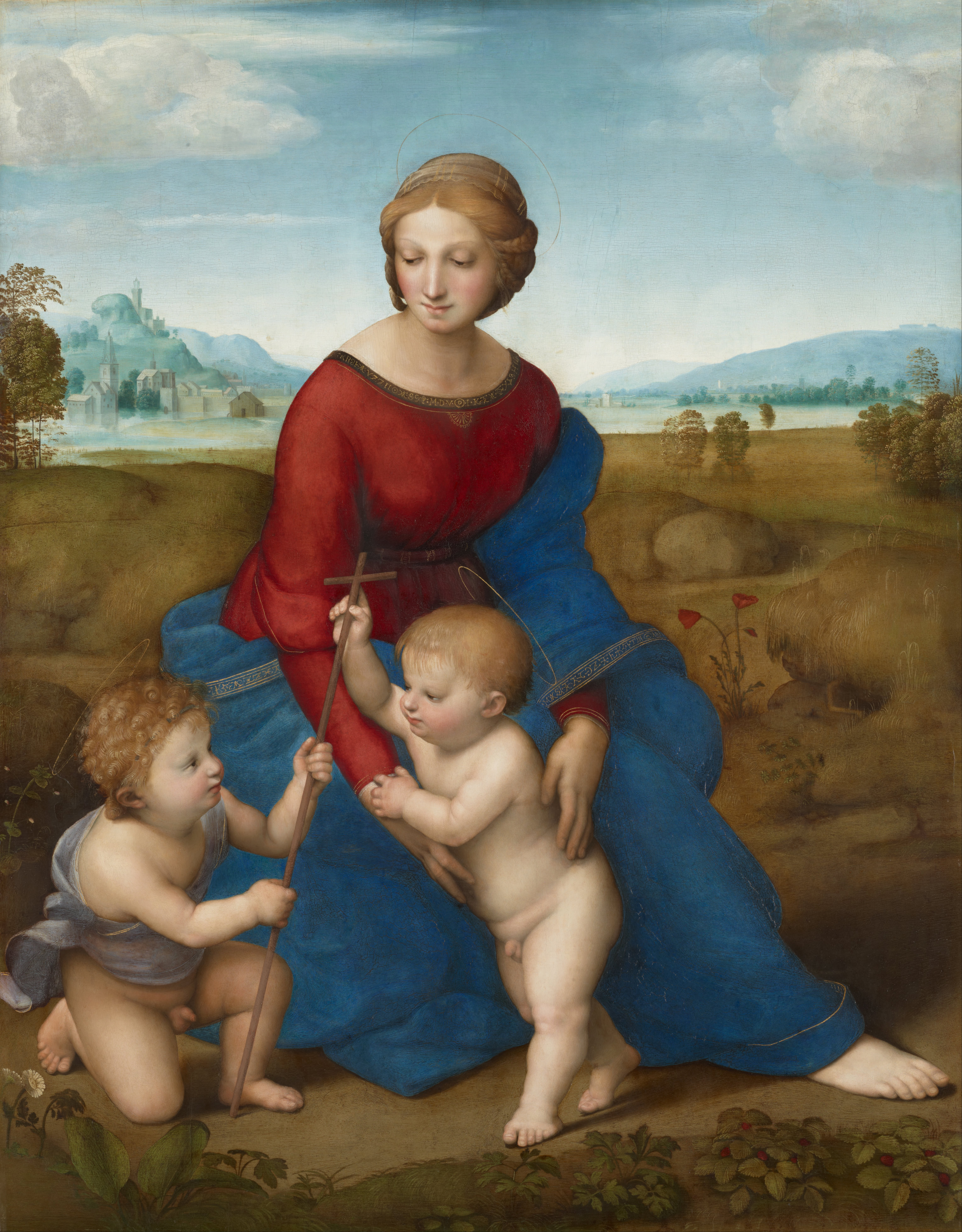
Raphael, Madonna in the Meadow (1505 - 1506).

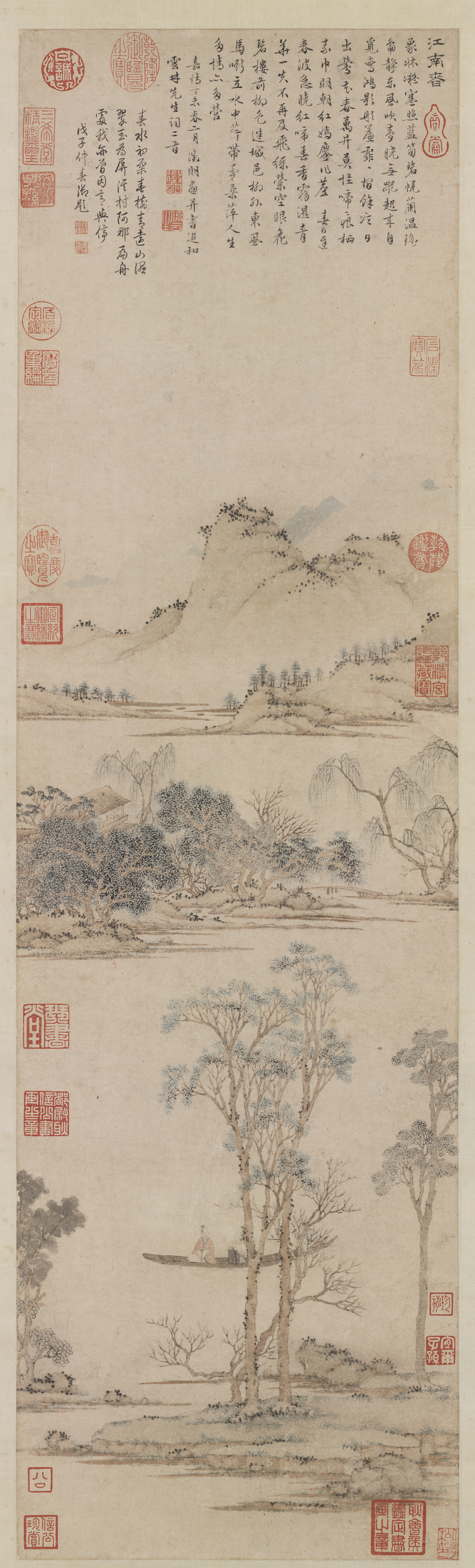
Spring in Kiangnan (1547) by Wen Cheng-Ming(1470-1559) (lower half detail).

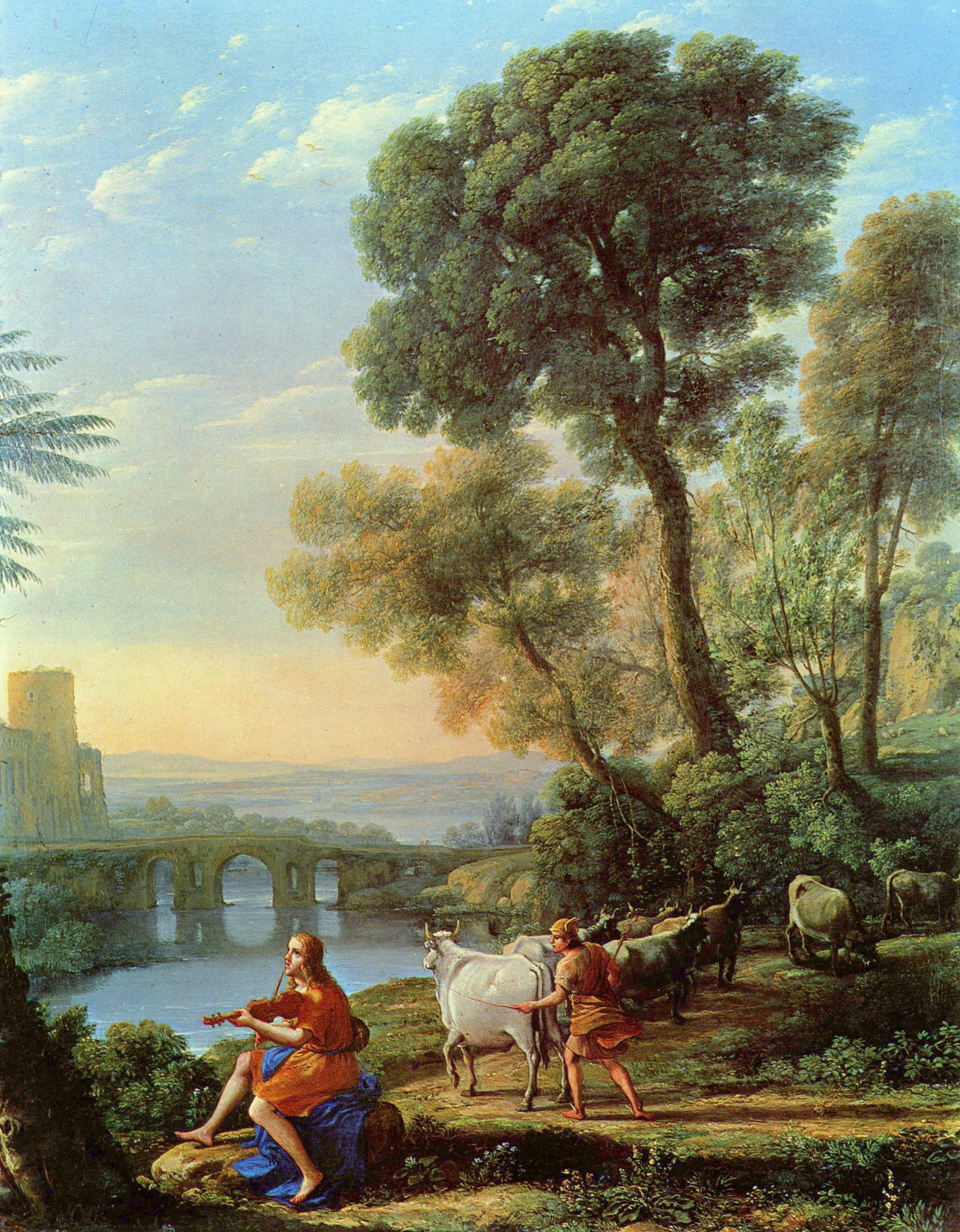
Claude Lorrain, Landscape with Apollo Guarding the Herds of Admetus and Mercury stealing them (1645).

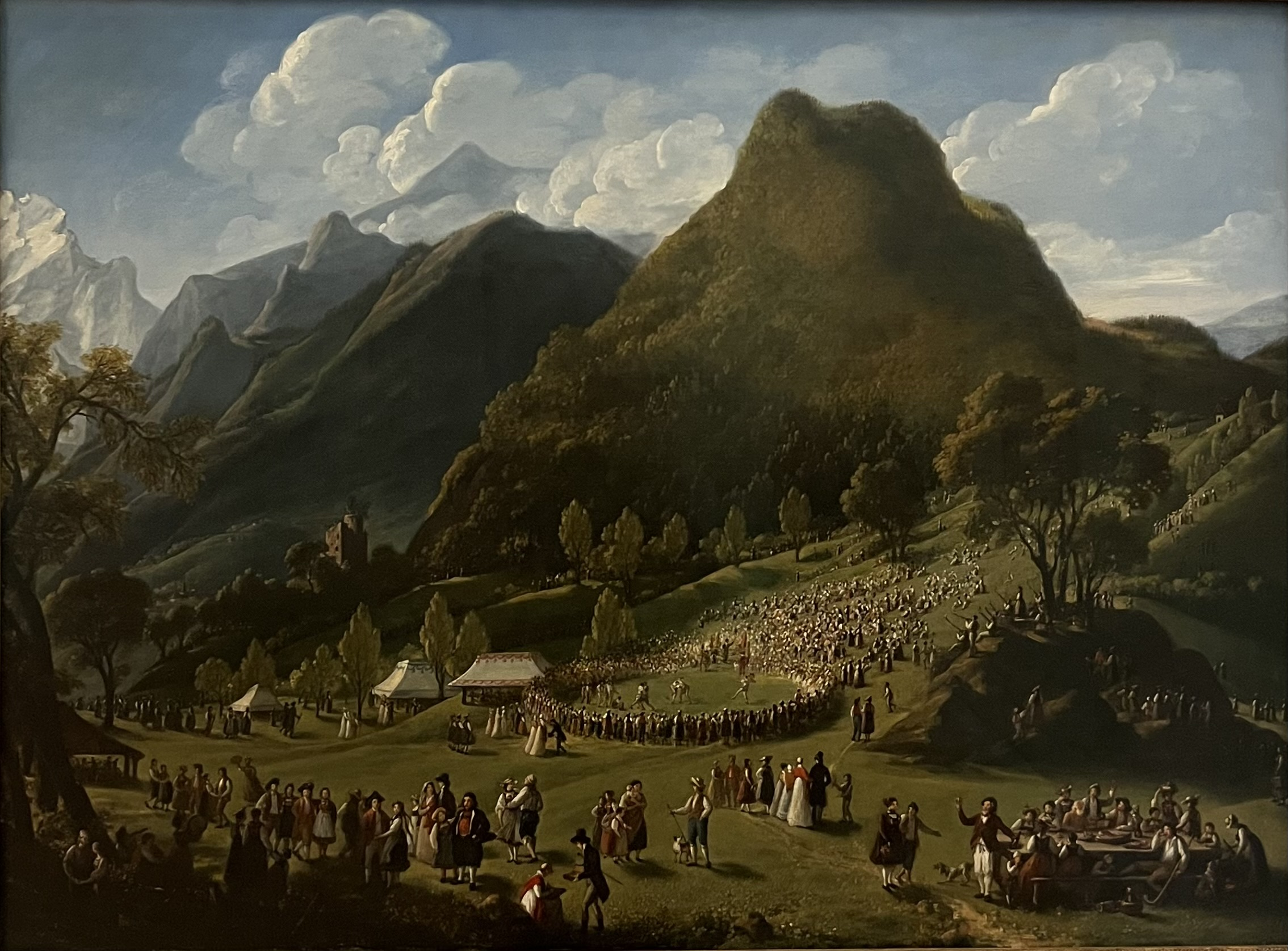
Élisabeth Vigée Le Brun, La Fête des bergers suisses à Unspunnen, (1808/1809)

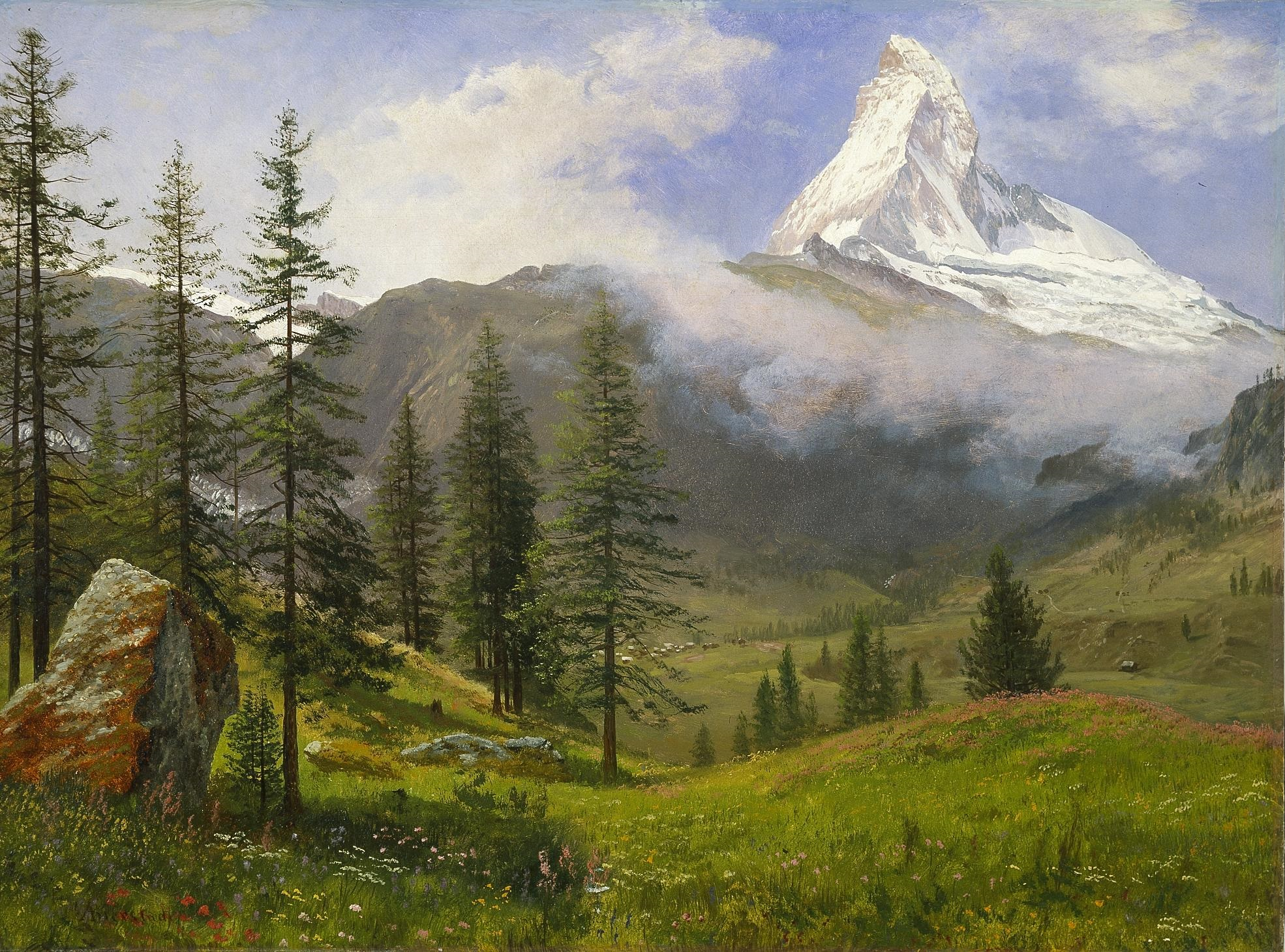
Albert Bierstadt, The Matterhorn (circa 1867).

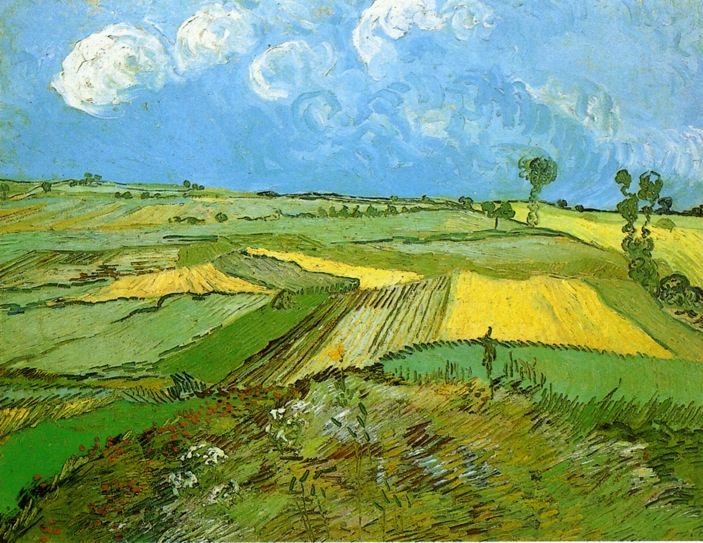
Vincent van Gogh, Wheat Fields at Auvers Under Clouded Sky (1890).

Pablo Picasso, 1908, Paysage aux deux figures (Landscape with Two Figures)

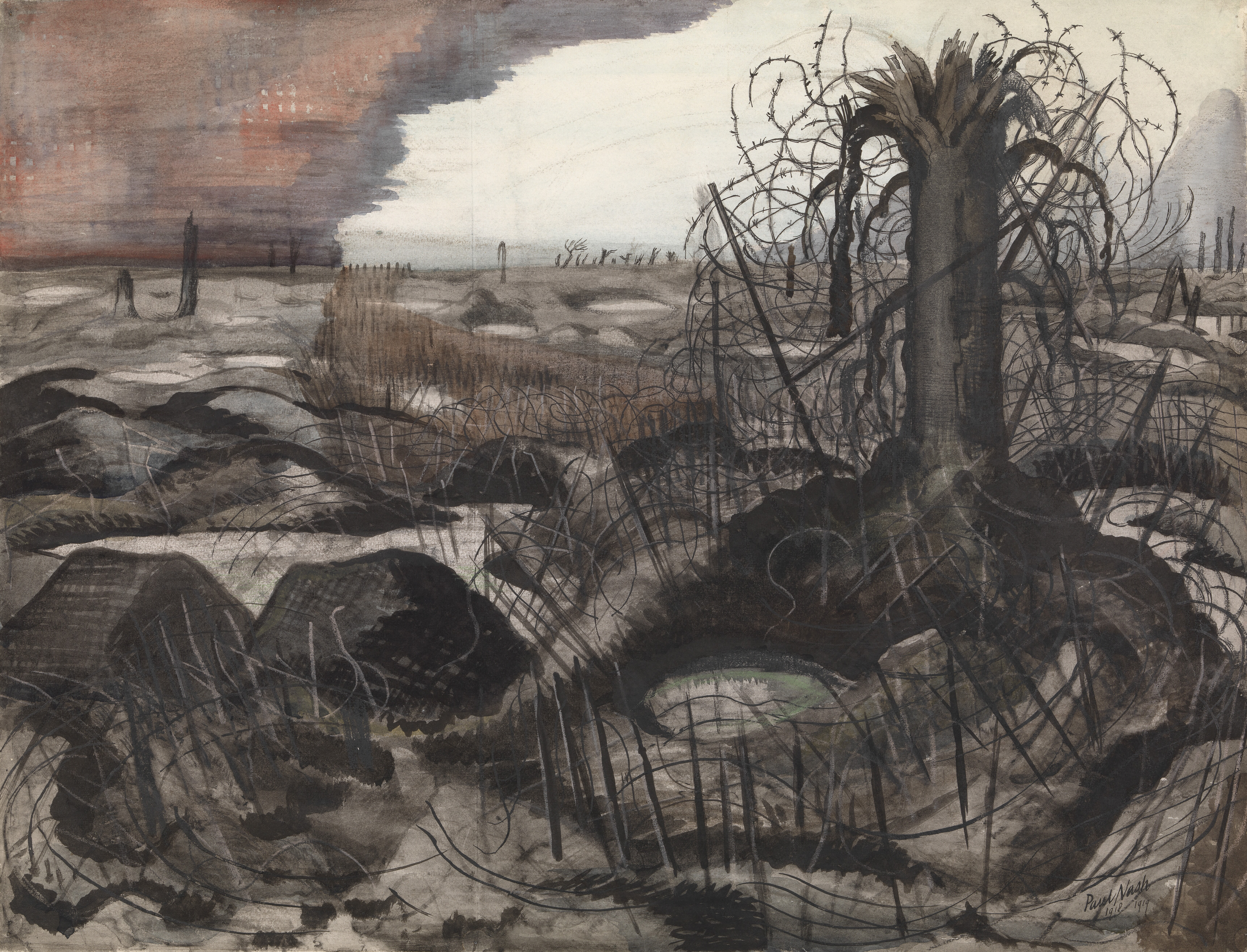
Paul Nash, Wire (1918).

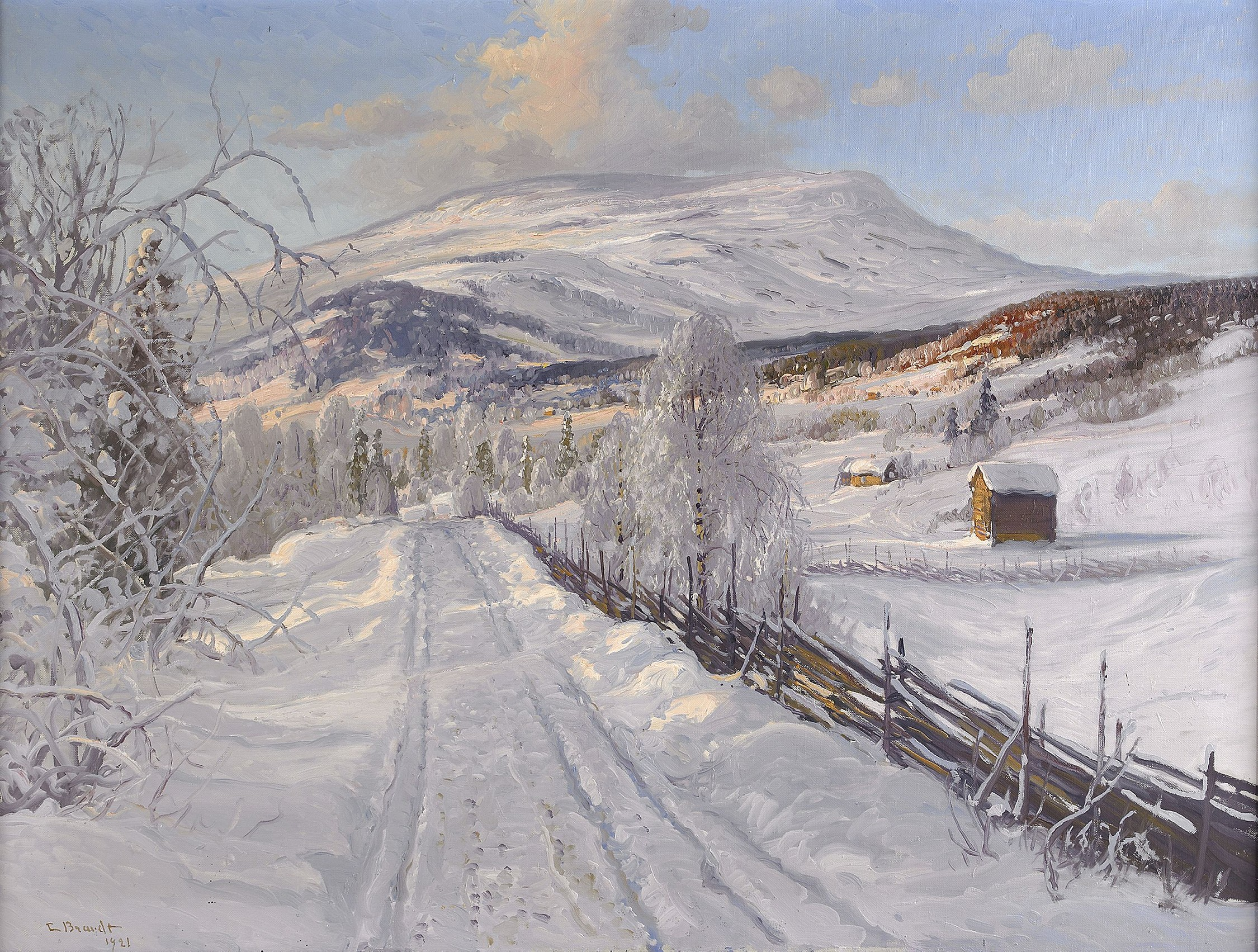
Carl Brandt: "Åreskutan, landscape", 1921 (Sweden)

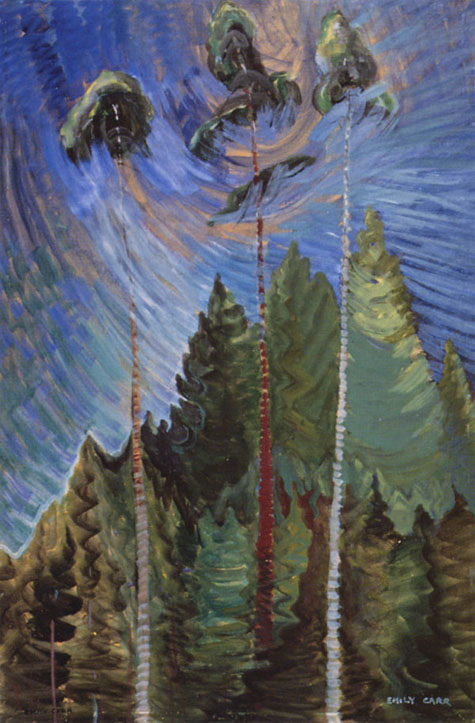
Emily Carr, Odds and Ends, 1939 (British Columbia, Canada)

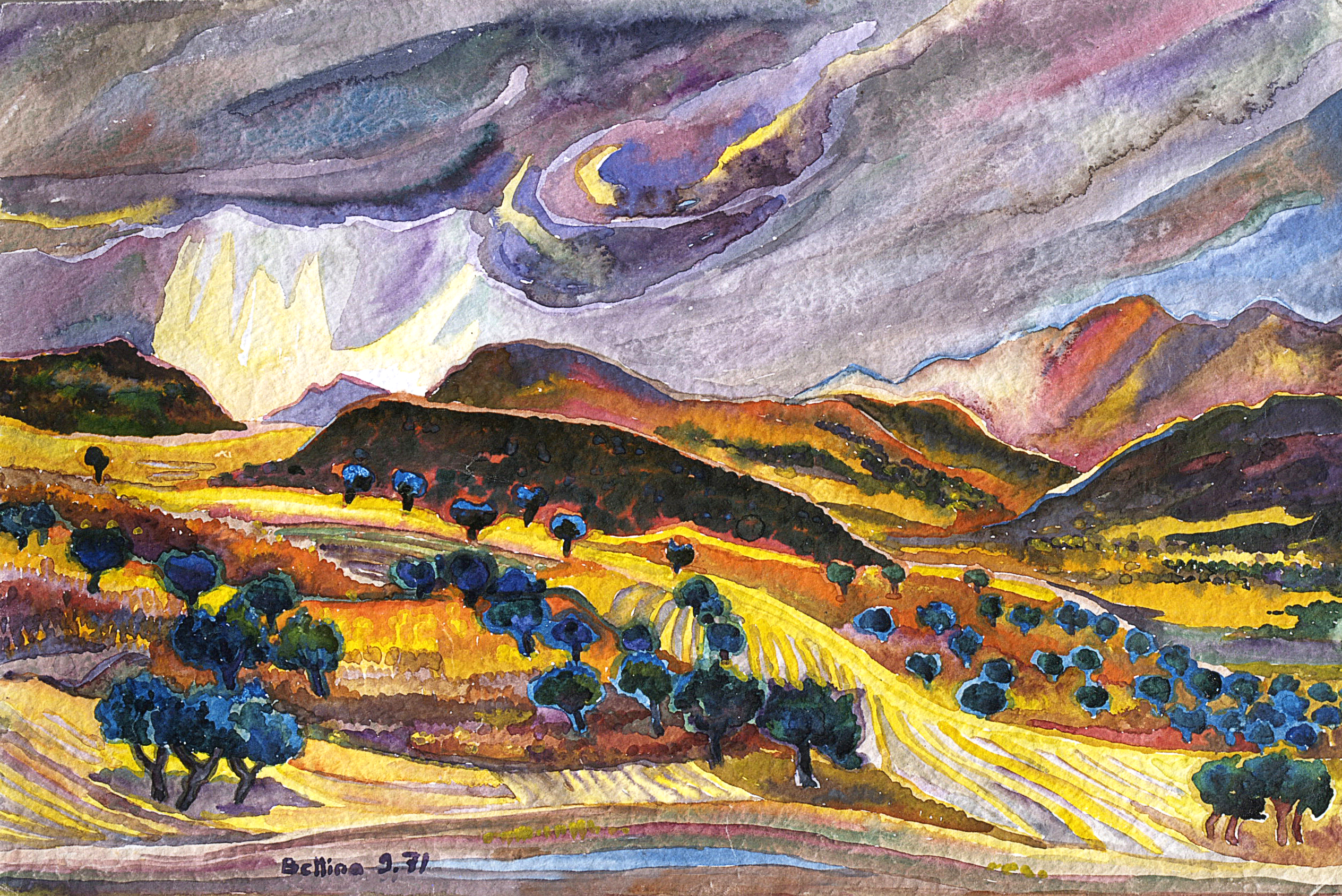
Bettina Heinen-Ayech, Sommergewitter in Algerien (1971)

== See also ==
- Boundaries in landscape history
- Landscape ecology
- Hardscape
- List of landscape gardens
- Softscape
- Soundscape
- Landscape mythology
- Terrain
- Taskscape
