= Institute of Geography =

Institute of Geography may refer to:

- Institute of Geographical Information Systems
- Institute of Geography (Pedagogical University of Kraków)
- Brazilian Institute of Geography and Statistics
- National Institute of Statistics and Geography (Mexico)
- Pan American Institute of Geography and History
- Geographic Institute Agustín Codazzi
- V.B. Sochava Institute of Geography SB RAS
- Institute of Geography of the National Academy of Sciences of Ukraine, a research institute of the National Academy of Sciences of Ukraine
