= Taskscape =

The term taskscape is often credited to social anthropologist Tim Ingold. As Ingold has described the term: "just as the landscape is an array of related features, so – by analogy – the taskscape is an array of related activities." Taskscape, then is a socially constructed space of human activity, understood as having spatial boundaries and delimitations for the purposes of analysis. Of key importance, is that taskscape as well as landscape, is to be considered as perpetually in process rather than in a static or otherwise immutable state. A taskscape is typically analyzed via five factors: mobility, habitat, economy, nature, and public space.

Tim Ingold coined the term in his 1993 article defining the spatial and temporal dimensions of the landscape in human life. He considers it as a methodological structure and analyses the temporality of the landscape in Pieter Bruegel's famous painting, The Harvesters.

== See also ==
- Landscape
