= George Van Dyne =

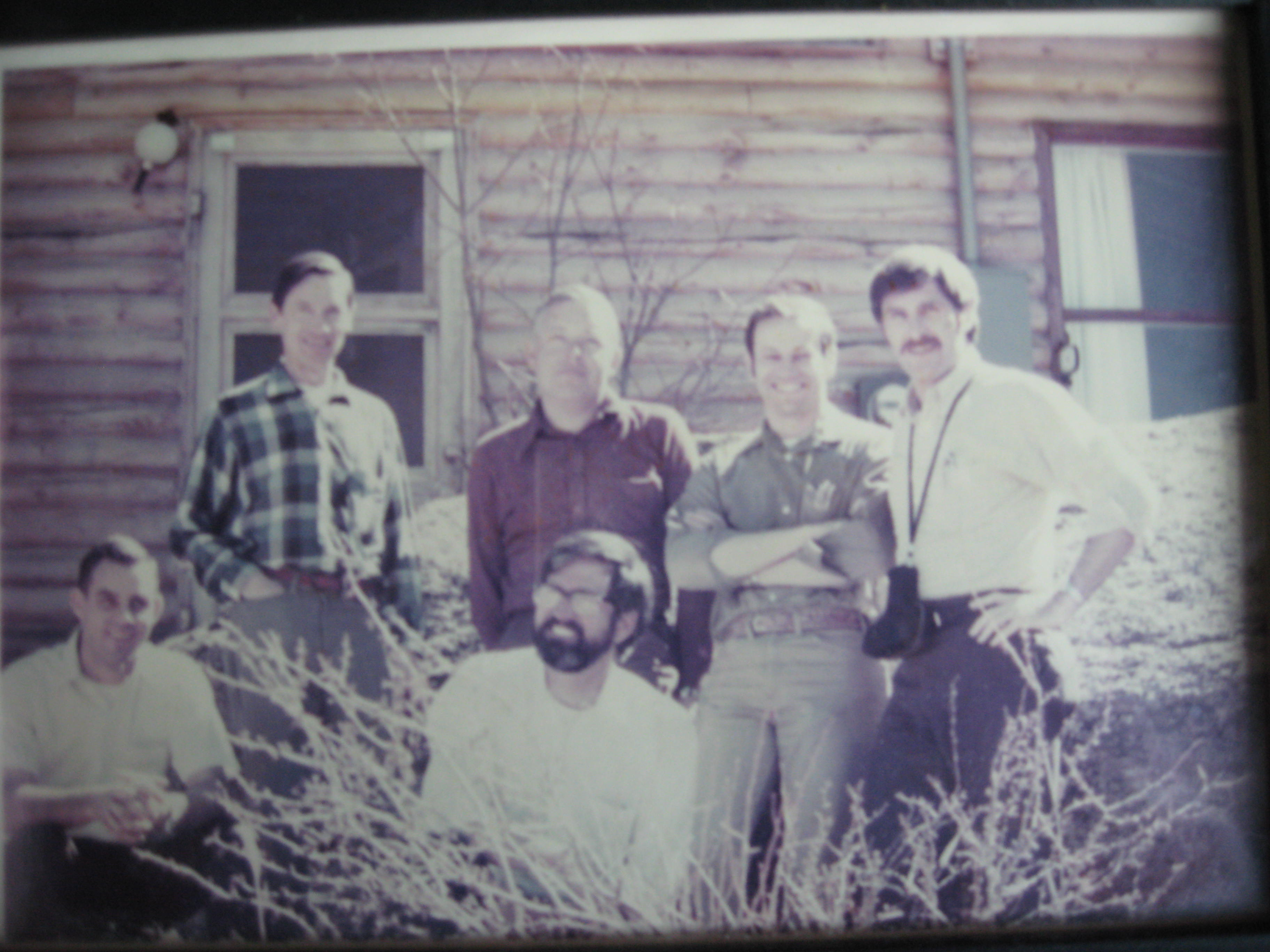
Staff of the Natural Resource Ecology Laboratory circa 1975, Van Dyne is second from the right

George Van Dyne (1933–1981) was an American ecologist. He is a pioneer of systems ecology and served as the first director of the Natural Resource Ecology Laboratory in the United States.

== Early career ==
Van Dyne was brought up on a ranch at Trinidad, Colorado, not far from the New Mexican border. Having developed skills as a horseman and an interest in the American West, he studied animal science at the Colorado State University. He followed this with a master's degree in range science at Dakota State University. He then gained his PhD from the University of California developing mathematical models for the ecosystem of rangeland. He then went to work at the Oak Ridge National Laboratory where he led the Environmental Sciences Section. He joined Jerry S. Olson and Bernard Pattern in delivering the first Systems Ecology course at the University of Tennessee.

== Scientific recognition ==
According to soviet geographer Viktor Sochava, the most advanced geosystems modeling was made by George Van Dyne at desert-steep territories of Colorado. His researches were presented by V. Sochava in 1970 at the meeting of All-Union Geographical Society. However, from that time Van Dyne's works were well known only at the Institute of Geography at the Siberian branch of Soviet Academy of Sciences in Irkutsk, which Van Dyne visited by Sochava's invitation. Only after his death, Van Dyne was understood in the Soviet Union as one of the most sophisticated western ecologists and his works were used as an example at the scientific council about biosphere problems at Soviet Academy of Sciences.
