= Tim Ingold =

British anthropologist

Tim Ingold CBE FBA FRSE
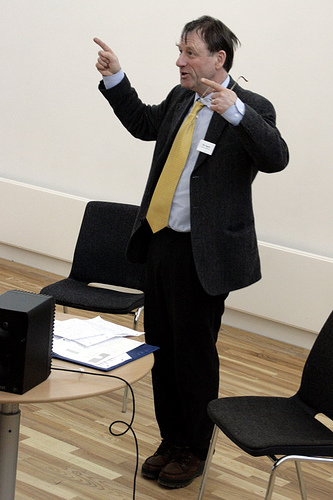
- Born: 1 November 1948 (age 77); Kent, England
- Known for: Taskscape

Academic background
- Education: University of Cambridge (BA, PhD)

Academic work
- Discipline: Social anthropology

Timothy Ingold CBE FBA FRSE (born 1 November 1948) is a British anthropologist, and Chair of Social Anthropology at the University of Aberdeen.

== Background ==
Ingold was educated at Leighton Park School in Reading. His father was the mycologist Cecil Terence Ingold. He attended Churchill College, Cambridge, initially studying natural sciences but shifting to anthropology (BA in Social Anthropology 1970, PhD 1976). His doctoral work was conducted with the Skolt Sámi of northeastern Finland, studying their ecological adaptations, social organisation and ethnic politics. His field work was primarily in the village of Sevettijärvi and in 2024 he donated his field diaries documenting Skolt life in the area in the early 1970s to the community. Ingold taught at the University of Helsinki (1973–74) and then the University of Manchester, becoming Professor in 1990 and Max Gluckman Professor in 1995. In 1999, he moved to the University of Aberdeen. In 2015, he received an honorary doctorate from Leuphana University of Lüneburg (Germany). He has four children.

== Research scope ==
To contextualise the development and breadth of Ingold’s research, several sources provide detailed accounts of his evolving scholarly trajectory.

These include From science to art and back again: The pendulum of an anthropologist (2016), an autobiographical article in which Ingold reflects on his career as a whole; Conversations with Tim Ingold: Anthropology, education and life (2024), a series of interviews discussing his major works and contributions; and a publicly available research statement on his official website, in which he outlines the development of his research interests over time.

== Contributions ==
His interests are wide-ranging and he has described his scholarly approach as forging a path distinct from mainstream anthropology. They include environmental perception, language, technology and skilled practice, art and architecture, creativity, theories of evolution in anthropology, human-animal relations, and ecological approaches in anthropology.

Early concern was with northern circumpolar peoples, looking comparatively at hunting, pastoralism and ranching as alternative ways in which such peoples have based a livelihood on reindeer or caribou.

In his recent work, he links the themes of environmental perception and skilled practice, replacing traditional models of genetic and cultural transmission, founded upon the alliance of neo-Darwinian biology and cognitive science, with a relational approach focusing on the growth of embodied skills of perception and action within social and environmental contexts of human development. This has taken him to examining the use of lines in culture, and the relationship between anthropology, architecture, art and design.

Drawing on Phenomenology, Ecological psychology and Process philosophy, Ingold explores the human as an organism which 'feels' its way through the world that "is itself in motion"; constantly creating and being changed by spaces and places as they are encountered.

== Influences ==
Ingold states that the works of Henri Bergson and Alfred North Whitehead had a "profound influence" on his thinking.

== Honours and awards ==
Ingold was appointed Commander of the Order of the British Empire (CBE) in the 2022 Birthday Honours for services to anthropology.

- Rivers Memorial Medal, RAI (1989)
- Fellow of the British Academy (1997)
- Fellow of the Royal Society of Edinburgh (2000)
- Huxley Memorial Medal recipient —established in 1900 in memory of Thomas Henry Huxley— for services to anthropology by the Council of the Royal Anthropological Institute of Great Britain and Ireland, the highest honour of the RAI (2014)
- Honorary doctorate of the Leuphana University of Lüneburg (2015)

== Bibliography ==
- Ingold, T. (2023) The Rise and Fall of Generation Now. Polity, London.
- Ingold, T., Gibb, R., Tonner, P. and Malara, D.M. (2025) Conversations with Tim Ingold: Anthropology, education and life. Scottish Universities Press, Edinburgh, UK.
- Ingold, T. (2021). Correspondences. Polity, London, UK.
- Ingold, T. (2018). Anthropology: Why it matters. Polity, London, UK.
- Ingold, T. (2017). Anthropology and/as education. Routledge, London, UK.
- Ingold, T. (2015). The Life of Lines. Routledge, London, UK.
- Ingold, T. (2013). Making: Anthropology, Archaeology, Art and Architecture. Routledge, London, UK.
- Ingold, T. & Palsson, G. (eds.) (2013). Biosocial Becomings: Integrating Social and Biological Anthropology. Cambridge University Press, Cambridge, MS.
- Janowski, M. & Ingold, T. (eds.) (2012). Imagining Landscapes: Past, Present and Future. Ashgate, Abingdon, UK.
- Ingold, T. (2011). Being Alive: Essays on Movement, Knowledge and Description. Routledge, London, UK.
- Ingold, T. (2011). Redrawing Anthropology: Materials, movements, lines. Ashgate, Aldershot.
- Ingold, T. & Vergunst, J. (eds.) (2008). Ways of Walking: Ethnography and Practice on Foot. Ashgate, Aldershot.
- Ingold, T. (2007). Lines: A Brief History. Routledge, Oxon, UK.
- Hallam, E. & Ingold, T. (2007). Creativity and Cultural Improvisation. A.S.A. Monographs, vol. 44, Berg Publishers, Oxford.
- Ingold, T. (2000). The perception of the environment: essays on livelihood, dwelling and skill. London: Routledge.
- Ingold, T. (1996). Key Debates In Anthropology
- Ingold, T. (1986). Evolution and social life. Cambridge: Cambridge University Press.
- Ingold, T. (1986). The appropriation of nature: essays on human ecology and social relations. Manchester: Manchester University Press.
- Ingold T. (1980). Hunters, pastoralists and ranchers: reindeer economies and their transformations . Cambridge: Cambridge University Press.
- Ingold T. (1976). The Skolt Lapps today. Cambridge: Cambridge University Press.

== See also ==
- New materialism
