= V.B. Sochava Institute of Geography SB RAS =

Soviet-Russian research institute

- Type: Geography, Ecology, Hydrology
- Established: 1957
- Location: Russia, Irkutsk, Russia
- Website: www.irigs.irk.ru/

The V.B. Sochava Institute of Geography SB RAS is a scientific institution in the east of Russia, focusing on geographical studies.

The institute was established on November 29, 1957. In 2005, it was named after Viktor Borisovich Sochava to honor his career in national geography. The prime mission of the institute is to conduct basic and applied research in the field of geographical science. Its principal areas of research focus on the study of the state and transformation processes of Siberia's nature, economy and population, and on the development of the principles of ecologically oriented utilization of its resources.

== Scientific schools ==
The institute has scientific schools on population geography, exogenous geomorphology, landscape hydrology, and landscape planning.

== Applied geography ==
The research efforts focus on ecological zoning of the Baikal natural territory, assessment of natural resources and distribution of productive forces of the Siberian regions, and on optimization of the network of specially protected natural territories.

== Conferences and lectures ==
Conferences are held of geographers of Siberia and the far East on and the Far East, on thematic cartography, landscape hydrology, assessment of potential natural resources, recreation geography, social geography, geoinformation and aerospace methods, and on modeling of geosystems, as well as scientific lectures in commemoration of Academician V.B. Sochava.

The V.B. Sochava Institute of Geography SB RAS website
