= Donnchadh Ruadh Mac Conmara =

Irish poet and schoolmaster (1715–1810)

Donnchadh Ruadh Mac Conmara (1715–1810) was an Irish schoolmaster of a hedge school, Jacobite propagandist, antihero in Irish folklore, and composer of poetry in both Munster Irish and in the Irish language outside Ireland.

== Life ==
He was born into the Irish clan Mac Conmara at Cratloe (Irish: An Chreatalach), County Clare (Contae an Chláir).

According to the oral tradition, Donnchadh Ruadh left Ireland and studied abroad to enter the priesthood of the still illegal and underground Catholic Church in Ireland, but was expelled from the Irish College in Rome and then spent several years wandering in Catholic Europe. Following his return to Ireland through the port of Waterford (Port Láirge), the poet settled in the Sliabh gCua district between the Comeraghs (Irish: Na Comaraigh) and Knockmealdown Mountains (Irish: Sléibhte Chnoc Mhaoldomhnaigh) of County Waterford, where he remains a well-known antihero in local Irish folklore.

Around 1741, he was appointed assistant master of the illegal Catholic hedge school at Seskinane, near Touraneena (Irish: Tuar an Fhíona), County Waterford. He is said locally to have been highly talented at Gaelic games and to have once led his students to victory upon the pitch against a rival hurling team from a neighbouring district.

He is said to have sailed for Newfoundland (Irish: Talamh an Éisc) around 1743. Donnchadh Ruadh was a notorious rake and allegedly fled to Newfoundland to escape the wrath of a local man whose daughter the poet had impregnated. During his residence at the port of St. John's (Irish: Baile Sheáin), Mac Conmara composed multiple Irish-language poems, including praises of Newfoundland and war poetry promoting the Jacobite rising of 1745. Even though the mixing of languages in verse is now generally assumed to date only from the radical innovations of early 20th-century Modernist poetry, Mac Conmara composed a poem in St. John's with alternating lines in Newfoundland English and Munster Irish. The English lines are praise poetry of a group of Englishmen whom the Bard met in St. John's, while the following lines in Munster Irish turn the Anglophilia of the English lines upon its head and give the poem a subversive message. The poems that Donnchadh Ruadh Mac Conmara composed in the Irish language in Newfoundland remain important works of modern literature in Irish.

After leaving Newfoundland he continued for a long period to work as a sailor, and his poem Bán Chnoic Éireann Óigh ("The Fair Hills of Holy Ireland"), is said to have been composed in Hamburg.

After returning to Ireland, Donnchadh Ruadh converted to Protestantism and read aloud an Oath of Abjuration inside the still extant Church of Ireland parish at Carrick-on-Suir (Irish: Carraig na Siúire). He then joined the Anglican parish at Rossmire, Newtown, near Kilmacthomas (Irish: Coill Mhic Thomáisín). He was briefly appointed as parish clerk, but when the Vicar and parishioners discovered how great a rogue he was, Donnchadh Ruadh was dismissed; he then converted back to Catholicism, and composed his poem Duain na hAithrighe ("Song of Repentance").

Following the death in 1795 of his close friend and fellow poet Tadhg Gaelach Ó Súilleabháin, Donnchadh Ruadh composed a eulogy for his friend in Neo-Latin verse.

In 1810, at the age of 95, Donnchadh Ruadh died in Newtown and lies buried in the Roman Catholic cemetery there. His death was briefly reported in the Freeman's Journal; "October 6th, 1810, at Newtown, near Kilmacthomas, in the 95th year of his age, Denis MacNamara, commonly known by the name Ruadh, or Red-haired, the most celebrated of the modern bards. His compositions will be received and read until the end of time with rapturous admiration and enthusiastic applause."

== Legacy ==
While still teaching at Synge Street CBS in Dublin, Francis MacManus wrote and published a trilogy of biographical novels set in Penal times and about the life of Donnchadh Ruadh Mac Conmara. This comprises Stand and Give Challenge (1934), Candle for the Proud (1936) and Men Withering (1939).

For a long time, it was doubted whether Donnchadh Ruadh ever even visited Newfoundland. During the 21st century, however, linguists discovered that multiple Donnchadh Ruadh poems in the Irish language contain Gaelicized renderings of words and terms that are unique to Newfoundland English. For this reason, Donnchadh Ruadh's poems are considered the earliest solid evidence of the speaking of the Irish language in Newfoundland.

== See also ==
- Clan MacNamara
- Diarmuid mac Sheáin Bhuí Mac Cárthaigh
- Dónall na Buile Mac Cárthaigh, fl. 1730s–1740s.
- Eoghan an Mhéirín Mac Cárthaigh, 1691–1756.
- History of hurling
- Irish language in Newfoundland
- Irish language outside Ireland
- Irish Newfoundlanders
- Irish people in mainland Europe
