= Irish language in Newfoundland =

Newfoundland Irish
- Newfoundland Gaelic
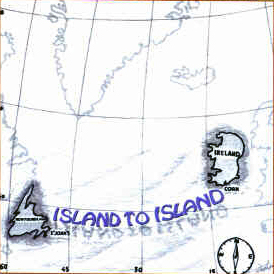
- Newfoundland and Ireland
- Ethnicity: Irish Newfoundlanders
- Extinct: early 20th century
- Language family: Indo-European: Celtic; Insular Celtic; Goidelic; Irish; Munster Irish; Newfoundland Irish
- Early forms: Primitive Irish: Old Irish; Middle Irish; Early Modern Irish; Modern Irish
- Writing system: Latin (Irish alphabet); Irish Braille

Language codes
- ISO 639-3: –
- IETF: ga-u-sd-canl

The Irish language was once spoken by some immigrants on the island of Newfoundland before it disappeared in the early 20th century. The language was introduced through mass immigration by Irish speakers, chiefly from counties Waterford, Tipperary and Cork. Local place names in the Irish language include Newfoundland (Irish: Talamh an Éisc; 'Land of the Fish'), St. John's (Baile Sheáin), Ballyhack (Baile Hac), Cappahayden (Ceapach Éidín), Kilbride and St. Bride's (Cill Bhríde), Duntara, Port Kirwan and Skibbereen (Scibirín). The dialect of Irish spoken in Newfoundland is said to resemble the Munster Irish of the 18th century. While the distinct local dialect is now considered extinct, the Irish language is still taught locally and the Gaelic revival organization Conradh na Gaeilge remains active in the province.

== Irish immigration ==
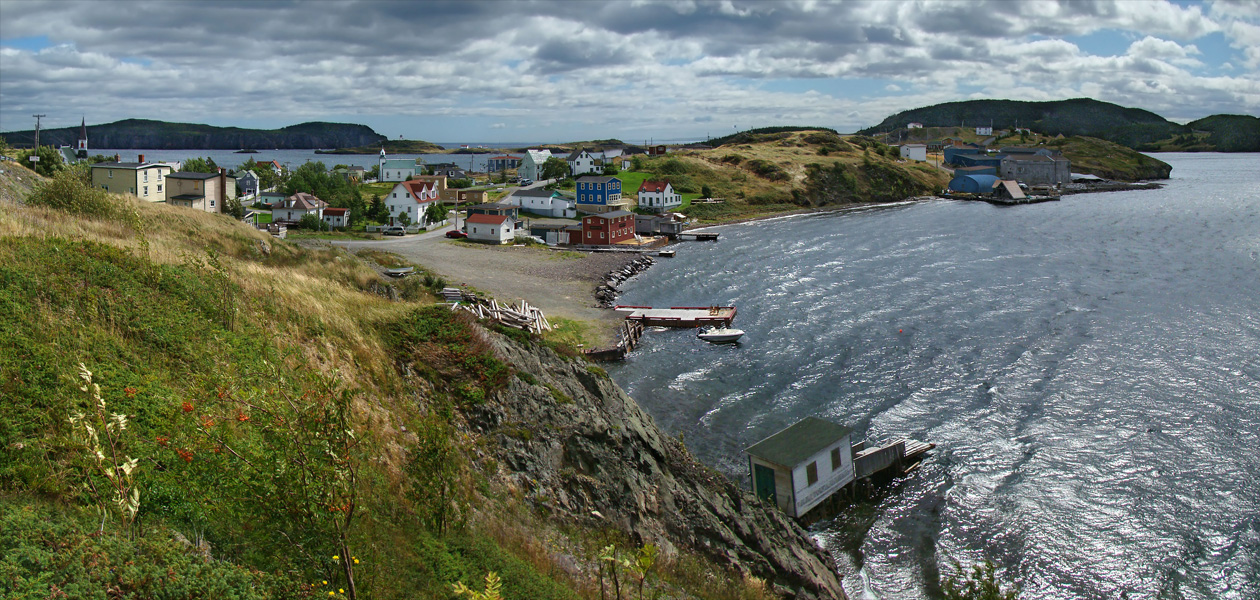
Irish settlers were established in Trinity Bay by 1675

The Irish language arrived in Newfoundland as a consequence of the English migratory cod fishery. While Sir Humphrey Gilbert formally claimed Newfoundland as an English overseas possession in 1583, this did not lead to permanent European settlement. A number of unsuccessful attempts at settlement followed, and the migratory fishery continued to grow. By 1620, fishermen from South West England dominated most of the east coast of Newfoundland, with the French dominant along the south coast and Great Northern Peninsula. After 1713, with the Treaty of Utrecht, the French ceded control of the south and north shores of the island to the British, keeping only the nearby islands of Saint Pierre and Miquelon off the south coast.

Irish labourers were recruited for the fishery from southeast Ireland. Irish settlers were reported to be residing at Ireland's Eye, Trinity Bay, by 1675, at Heart's Content in 1696, and at St. John's by 1705. Thomas Nash, an Irish Roman Catholic, was one of the later pioneers of Irish settlement in Newfoundland. A native of County Kilkenny, he arrived on the Southern Shore in 1765 and eventually settled in the Branch area.

Between 1750 and 1830, and particularly between 1793 and 1815, large numbers of Irish people, including many Irish speakers, emigrated to Newfoundland, known colloquially simply as an tOileán, 'the Island'. An account dating from 1776 describes how seasonal workers from Cork, Kerry, and elsewhere would come to Waterford to take passage to Newfoundland, taking with them all they needed.

In the oral tradition of County Waterford, the poet Donnchadh Ruadh Mac Conmara, a former hedge school teacher, is said to have sailed for Newfoundland around 1754. For a long time, it was doubted whether the poet ever made the trip. During the 21st century, however, linguists discovered that several of Donnchadh Ruadh's poems in the Irish language contain multiple Gaelicized words and terms known to be unique to Newfoundland English. For this reason, Donnchadh Ruadh's poems are considered the earliest solid evidence that the Irish language was spoken in Newfoundland.

Donnchadh Ruadh provides a description of the rewards of going to Newfoundland (with a burlesque flavour) in a poem describing his deep sea-chest filled with eggs, butter, bacon and other necessities:

Do thug an pobal i bhfochair a chéile
Chum mo chothuighthe i gcogadh nó i spéirlinn –
Stór nach g-caillfeadh suim de laethibh,
As cófra doimhin a d-toilfinn féin ann;
Do bhí seach bh-fichid ubh circe 'gus eunla ann
Le h-aghaidh a n-ithte chomh minic 's badh mhéin liom –
Cróca ime do dingeadh le saothar
As spóla soille ba throime 'ná déarfainn ...

The people brought together
So as to nourish me in war or strife –
A treasure that they would not lose for many a day,
And a deep chest that I would like myself;
There were a hundred and forty hens' eggs and birds,
For me to eat as often as I would wish –
A crock packed tight with butter
And a fat joint of meat heavier than I could tell.

County Kilkenny's contribution to this emigration was 25%, followed by County Wexford (at least 23%), County Waterford (at least 20%) and County Tipperary (at least 15%), with County Cork adding a further 6%. Wexford was the county of origin in which the Irish language was least spoken. The other counties, mostly in Munster, were part of an area in which Irish was widely spoken until at least the middle of the 19th century. An illustration of this is furnished by the estimated percentage of Irish speakers for the decennial period 1771–1781 in the following counties: County Kilkenny 57%, County Tipperary 51%, County Waterford 86%, County Kerry 93%, and County Cork 84%. This is borne out by observations made in 1819 by James McQuige, a veteran Methodist lay preacher in Irish:

In many parts of Ireland I have travelled frequently twenty miles without being able to obtain directions on my way, except in Irish ... I need hardly dwell on the Catholic counties, Cork and Kerry, where even the few Protestants speak their native tongue [i.e. Irish] ... In some of the largest southern towns, Cork, Kinsale, and even the Protestant town of Bandon, provisions are sold in the markets, and cried in the streets, in Irish.

Most Irish settled on the Avalon Peninsula, with many in the main port and present capital of St. John's.

Some Irish immigrants to Newfoundland moved on, and many others were part of an annual seasonal migration between Ireland and Newfoundland. Most landed in the Newfoundland ports of St. John's and Harbour Grace, and many moved on to smaller outports on the coast of the Avalon Peninsula. By the 1780s, the Irish had become the dominant ethnic group in and around the St. John's area, in a population of about 3,200. Many were engaged in fishing and had little formal education. Many were servants who came to Newfoundland alone, but others had families, in which the labour of women and children was essential. Most families had a small plot of land.

By 1815, the Irish in Newfoundland numbered over 19,000. Emigration was encouraged by political discontent at home, overpopulation and impoverishment. It was also aided by the fact that legislation of 1803 designed to regulate conditions on British passenger vessels, making the passage too expensive for the poorest, such as the Irish, did not apply to Newfoundland, which was viewed as a fishery rather than a colony.

== Language and culture ==
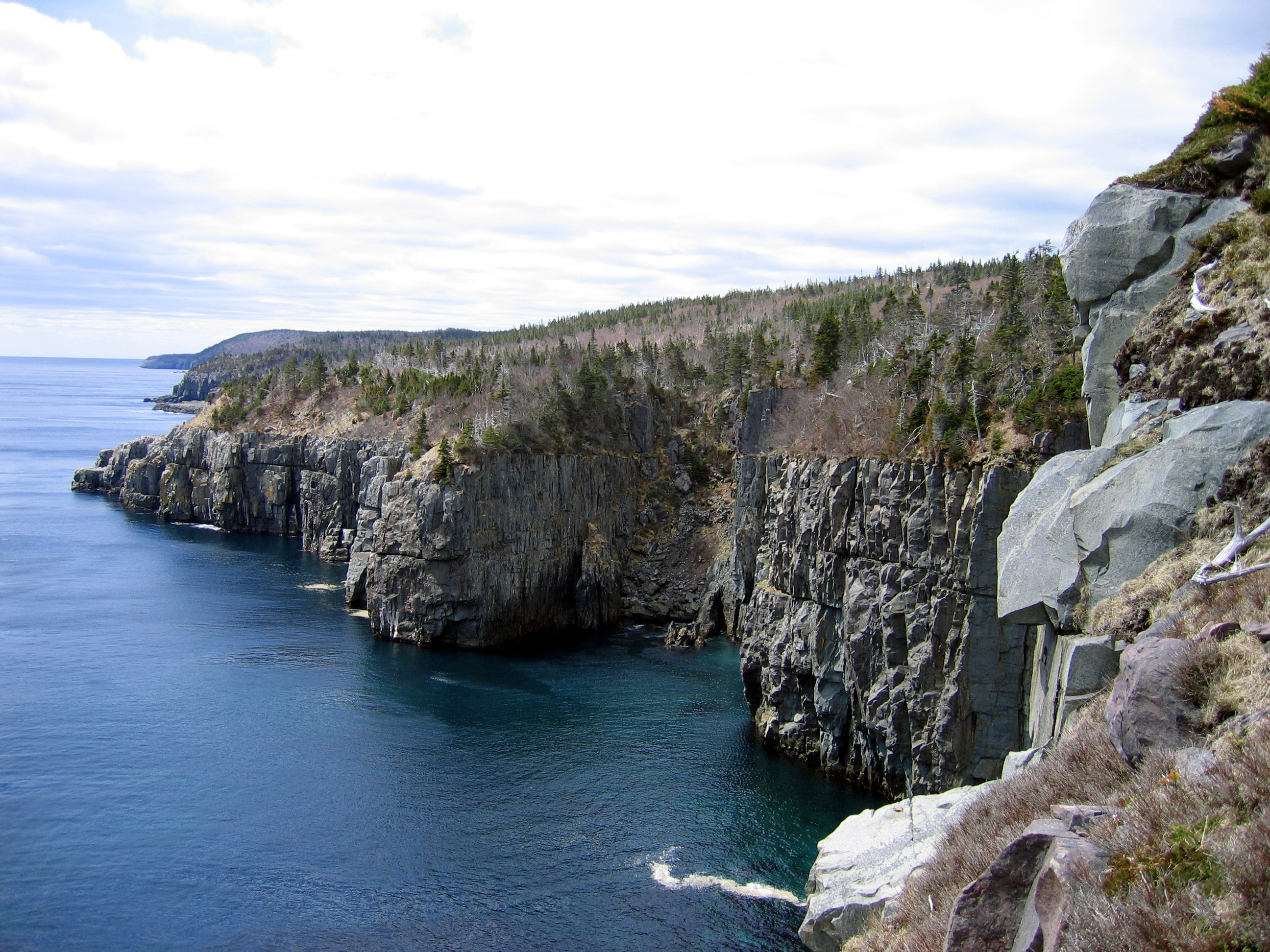
The coast of the Avalon Peninsula, in the province of Newfoundland and Labrador

The use of the Irish language in Newfoundland was closely tied to the persistence of an ancestral culture preserved in scores of enclaves along the coast. That culture, in the Avalon Peninsula and elsewhere, included feast days, holy wells, games, mumming, Irish bardic poetry, faction fighting, and Gaelic games such as hurling. Church services were often conducted in the Irish language. The post-1815 economic collapse in Newfoundland after the Napoleonic Wars caused many of these Irish-speaking settlers to flee to the nearby Maritime colonies, taking their language with them.

Court records show that defendants sometimes required Irish-speaking interpreters, as in the case of an Irishman in Fermeuse in 1752.

Ecclesiastical records also illustrate the prevalence of Irish. In the mid-1760s the Reverend Laurence Coughlan, a Methodist preacher, converted most of the North Shore of Newfoundland to Protestantism. Observers credited the success of his evangelical revival at Carbonear and Harbour Grace to the fact that he was fluent in Irish. There are references to the need for Irish-speaking priests between 1784 and 1807. In letters to Dublin, the Catholic Bishop James Louis O'Donel, when requesting a Franciscan missionary for the parishes of St. Mary's and Trepassey, said that it was absolutely necessary that he should be able to speak Irish. O'Donel himself was an Irish speaker, and the fact that his successor Bishop Patrick Lambert (a Leinsterman and coadjutor bishop of St. John's from 1806) had no Irish may have contributed to the mistrust shown towards him by Irish-speaking Newfoundlanders.

Beginning in the 1870s, the more politicized Irish-Americans began taking interest in their ancestral language. Gaelic revival organizations like the Philo-Celtic Society began springing up throughout the United States. Irish-American newspapers and magazines also began adding columns in the Irish language. These same publications also circulated widely among Irish-Canadians. Furthermore, the sixth President of St. Bonaventure's College in St. John's, Newfoundland was not only a member of the Society for the Preservation of the Irish Language, but also taught Irish-language classes there during the 1870s. Although the subject still remains to be explored, Kenneth E. Nilsen, an American linguist specializing in the Celtic languages in North America, argued in a posthumously published essay that "closer inspection would likely reveal a Canadian counterpart to the American language revival movement."

== Revival ==
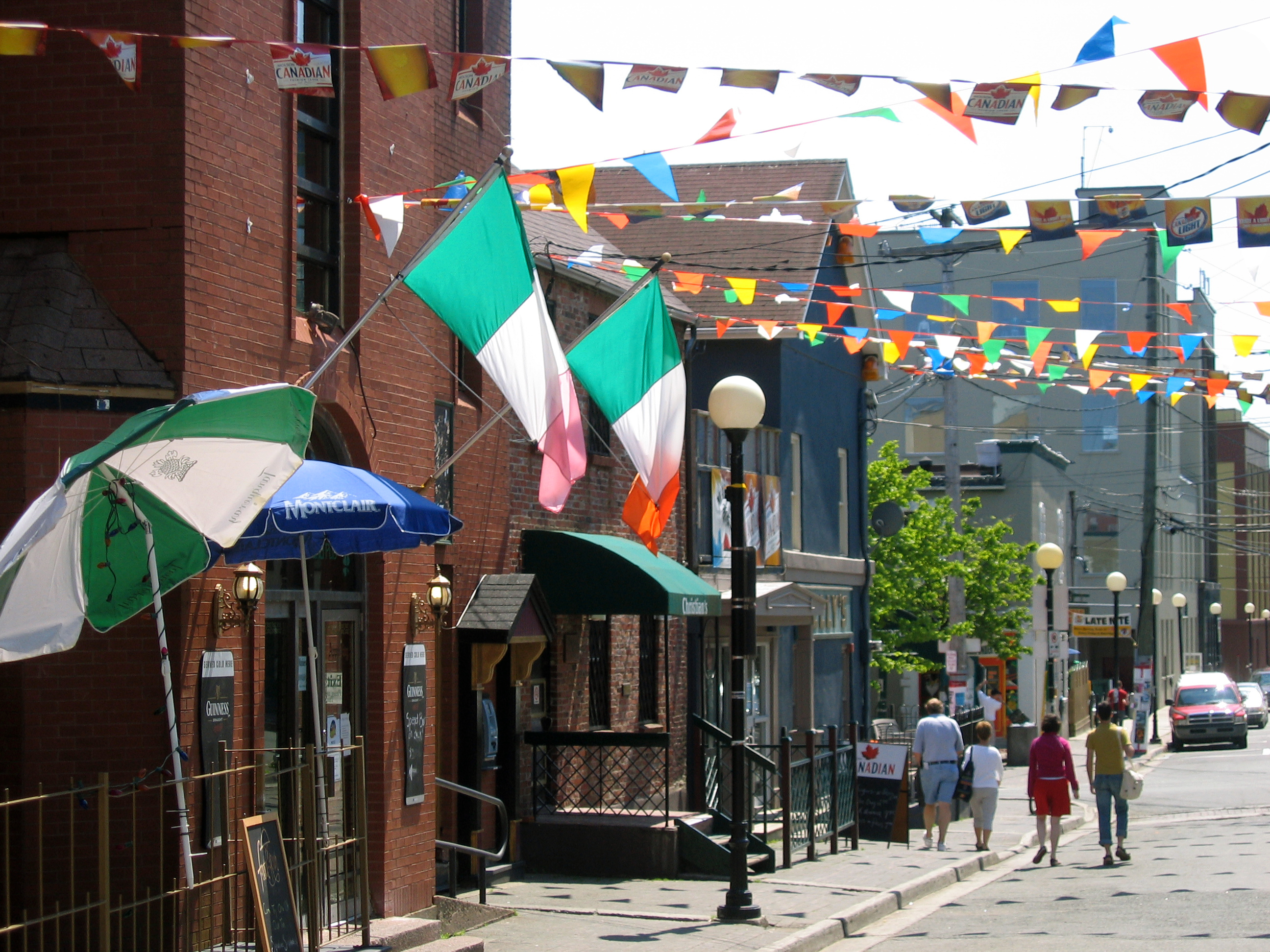
Newfoundland Tricolour along with the Irish flag in St. John's, 2005

The identities of the last speakers of Newfoundland Irish are unknown. There is a lack of information of the sort available from the adjacent Province of New Brunswick (where, in the 1901 Census, several individuals and families listed Irish as their mother tongue and as a language still spoken by them). The question of how far Newfoundland Irish evolved as a separate dialect remains open. Newfoundland Irish has left traces in Newfoundland English, such as the following: scrob 'scratch' (Irish: scríob), sleveen 'rascal' (slíbhín) and streel 'slovenly person' (sraoill), along with grammatical features like the "after" perfect as in "she's already after leavin'" (tá sí tar éis imeachta).

The most notable scholar of the Irish language in Newfoundland was St. John's native Aloysius (Aloy) O'Brien (16 June 1915 – 8 August 2008). O'Brien's paternal grandmother, Bridget Conway, had spoken Irish (which she had learned growing up in Ireland) but his father did not speak it. O'Brien taught himself Irish by means of language records, cassette tapes, and the booklets of Eugene O'Growney, a notable figure in Ireland's Gaelic revival. O'Brien was thus enabled to become an authority on the many Irish words used in Newfoundland English and became a teacher of the language at the Memorial University of Newfoundland. He claimed, despite this, that he was not fluent in Irish, lacking opportunities for immersion.

There is interest in the Irish language, as indicated by the fact that Memorial University in St. John's, employs one of the Irish language instructors appointed every year by the Ireland Canada University Foundation to work in Canadian universities and support the Irish language in the wider community. Memorial University's Digital Learning Centre provides resources for learning the Irish language.

Efforts to revive the Irish language in Newfoundland are taking place, however.

In a 2016 article for The Irish Times, Sinéad Ní Mheallaigh, who teaches Irish at Memorial University, wrote, "There is a strong interest in the Irish language. Irish descendent and farmer Aloy O'Brien, who died in 2008 at the age of 93, taught himself Irish using the Buntús Cainte books and with help from his Irish-speaking grandmother. Aloy taught Irish in Memorial University for a number of years, and a group of his students still come together on Monday nights. One of his first students, Carla Furlong, invites the others to her house to speak Irish together as the 'Aloy O'Brien Conradh na Gaeilge' group."

Ní Mheallaigh further wrote, "An important part of my role here in Newfoundland is organising Irish language events, both in the university and the community. We held an Irish language film festival on four consecutive Mondays throughout November. Each evening consisted of a short film, and a TG4 feature-length film, preceded by an Irish lesson. These events attracted people from all parts of society, not just those interested in Ireland and the language. The students took part in the international Conradh na Gaeilge events for 'Gaeilge 24' and we will have Gaelic sports and a huge Céilí mór later in March."

== See also ==
- Irish language outside Ireland
- Irish Newfoundlanders
- Canadian Gaelic
- Newfoundland English
