= Gaelic football, hurling and camogie positions =

Positions in Gaelic sports

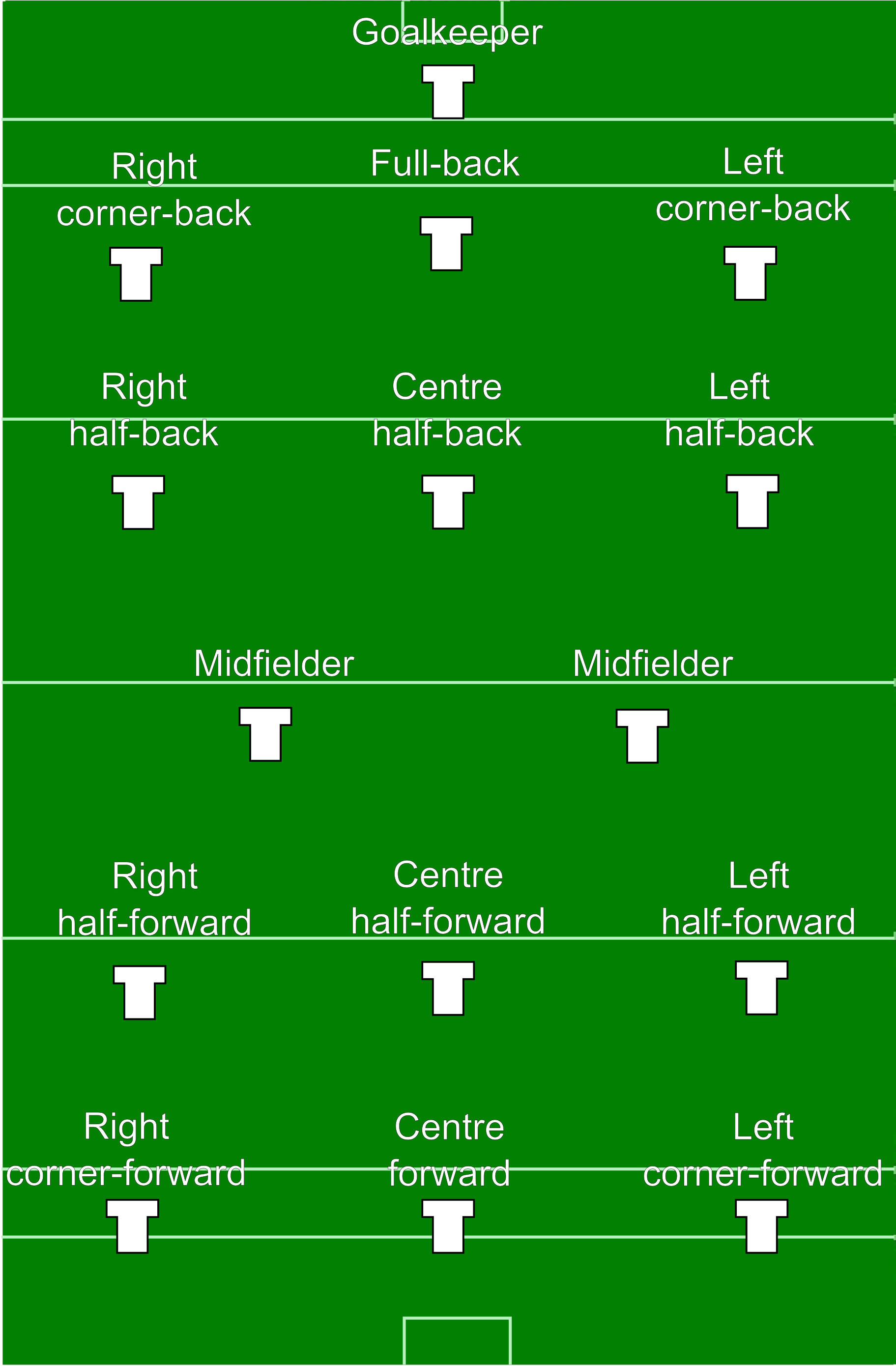
Standard hurling positions

The following are the positions in the Gaelic sports of Gaelic football, hurling and camogie.

Each team consists of one goalkeeper (who wears a different colour jersey), six backs, two midfielders, and six forwards: 15 players in all. Some under-age games are played 13-a-side (in which case the full-back and full-forward positions are removed) or 11-a-side (in which case the full-back, centre back, centre forward and full-forward positions are removed).

The positions are listed below, with the jersey number usually worn by players in that position given.

No.	Position	Alternate name(s)	Irish language
1	Goalkeeper	Goalie, keeper, nets	Cúl Báire
2	Right corner-back	Right full-back	Lánchúlaí deas
3	Full-back		Lánchúlaí láir
4	Left corner-back	Left full-back	Lánchúlaí clé
5	Right half-back	Right wing-back	Leathchúlaí deas
6	Centre half-back	Centre back	Leathchúlaí láir
7	Left half-back	Left wing-back	Leathchúlaí clé
8	Midfielders	Centre-field	Lár na páirce
9	Midfielders	Centre-field	Lár na páirce
10	Right half-forward	Right wing-forward	Leatosaí deas
11	Centre half-forward	Centre forward	Leatosaí láir
12	Left half-forward	Left wing-forward	Leatosaí clé
13	Right corner-forward	Right full-forward	Lántosaí deas
14	Full-forward		Lántosaí láir
15	Left corner-forward	Left full-forward	Lántosaí clé
16+	Substitutes	Subs	Fir ionad / Mná ionad

== Goalkeeper ==
The role of a goalkeeper, who wears the number 1 jersey in Gaelic games, is similar to other sports: to prevent the ball from entering the goal. The goalkeeper in Gaelic football and hurling also usually has the role of kicking or pucking the ball out to the outfield players. There is no limit to where on the field the goalkeeper can travel, although once they are outside the penalty area, they are subject to the same rules as all other players. A goalkeeper in men's football may touch the ball on the ground within his own small parallelogram, and is the only player permitted to do so. It is not permitted to physically challenge a goalkeeper while inside his own small parallelogram, but players may harass him into playing a bad pass, or block an attempted pass.

== Full-backs ==
=== Right and left corner-back ===
The role of the right and left corner-back who, respectively, wear the number 2 and number 4 jerseys, is to defend against opposing attackers – in particular the left and right corner-forwards. They will play most around the 20-metre line. The positions require the players having decent speed over short bursts and good hand eye co-ordination, and agility is required.

=== Full-back ===
The role of full-back who wears the number 3 jersey is one of the most important in Gaelic football or hurling. As well as defending against attackers, the full-back is responsible for organising the defence and is the key defender in front of goals, and is usually one of the tallest and strongest players on the team. The full back plays most often around the 20-metre line. The position of the full-back requires that the player have decent speed over short bursts, strength, and good hand eye co-ordination. In playing either corner-back or full-back positions a well-developed aerobic system is required although, unlike the corner-backs, the full-back is needed to make short burst sprints both away from and into the goal area.

== Half-backs ==
=== Right and left half-backs ===
The role of the half backs who wear the 5 (right) and 7 (left) jerseys is less defensive than that of the corner-backs. The half-backs operate most often in between the 45-metre line and the midfield. The half-backs are expected to defend against the opposition's half-forward line but also has a responsibility to make runs from the 45-metre line to advance the play to the half-forward and full-forward lines.

Sometimes referred to as right/left wing-back.

=== Centre half-back ===
The role of the centre half-back who wears the number 6 jersey, is less defensive than that of the full-back. The centre backs operates from the 45-metre line and forward to the midfield. The centre back will help win the breaking ball in the midfield and can be used as a third midfielder. The centre half-back generally marks the centre half-forward. Sometimes referred to as centre back. The required agilities of a centre half-back are strength, height, speed and a good catching game.

== Midfield ==
The role of the midfield who wears the number 8 or 9 jersey is to catch kick outs / puck outs from either team's goalkeeper, and to act as the main link between the defending and attacking sections of the team. Midfield is often described as the most important role on the pitch.
If the opposing goalkeeper is kicking the ball to the middle of the field, the midfielder has the responsibility to retrieve the ball and therefore prevent the opposing team from taking advantage and bringing the ball forward. This then gives a new responsibility to the midfielder to get the ball moving forward to the half forward and full forward lines. The position requires the player to have strength, height, speed, good catching ability, a good kicking game and, most importantly, endurance.
It is important for the midfield to have a good understanding of their goalkeeper. They must anticipate where their goalkeeper will place the ball and therefore take advantage and bring the ball forward.
Note that there is rarely a "left midfielder" and "right midfielder" – both play 'off' each other as a combined unit.

If one midfielder is attacking, the other always goes up the field with him in support. Both midfielders always attack or defend at the same time.

== Half-forwards ==
=== Right and left wing-forwards ===
The role of the right and left wing-forward who wear, respectively, numbers 10 and number 12 jerseys, is to build up attacks and to feed the ball to the full-forward line and also taking shots on goal or above the bar when opportunities present themselves. The wing-forwards will cover much ground and utilising speedy wing-forwards to run at defences is a common tactic. They operate from the midfield to the opposition's 45 metre line. The right wing-forward's main opposing player is the left wing-back and vice versa.

Sometimes referred to as right/left half forward.

=== Centre half-forward ===
The role of the centre -forward who wears the number 11 jersey, is to build up attacks and feed the ball to the full-forward line. The centre -forward is responsible for taking shots on goal and points when opportunities present themselves. The centre forward will cover much ground and utilising speedy half forwards to run at defences is a common tactic. The centre forward also helps win breaking ball in the midfield, helping to win the possession to bring the ball forward. The centre forward operates from the midfield to the opposition's 45-metre line.

Sometimes referred to as half forward.

== Full-forwards ==
=== Left and right corner-forward ===
The role of the left and right corner-forwards, who wear the number 13 and 15 jerseys respectively, is to watch the full-forward's breaks and to score points and goals. The full-forward line operates around the opposition's 21-metre line. The corner-forwards are generally marked by the corner-backs.

=== Full-forward ===
The role of the full-forward who wears the number 14 jersey is to score goals in particular although points are usually the outcome of their attempts on goal. The full-forward line operates around the opposition's 21-metre line. The full-forward is generally marked by the full back.

It is common for teams to employ a tall full-forward to pluck high balls from the sky and to challenge the size and strength of the full-back.

== Substitute ==
Substitutes wear jersey numbers 16 upwards (usually up to 31). 16 is usually worn by the substitute goalkeeper, and the third choice goalkeeper usually wears the number 31 jersey.

== See also ==
- Number (sports)
