= Aherla =

Village in County Cork, Ireland

Aherla An Eatharla
- Village
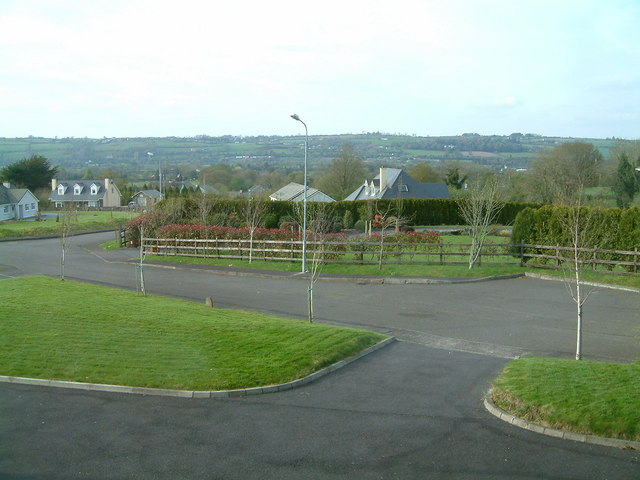

- Location in Ireland
- Coordinates: 51°51′26″N 8°44′20″W
- Country: Ireland
- Province: Munster
- County: County Cork

Population (2022)
  - Total: 562
- Time zone: UTC+0 (WET)
  - Summer (DST): UTC-1 (IST (WEST))

Aherla (Irish: An Eatharla) is a small village in County Cork, Ireland, with a population of 562. It is in the townlands of Aherla More and Rathard. Aherla is built on a limestone shelf typical of County Cork's ridges and valleys. The village is within the Cork North-West Dáil constituency.

The area has a number of historical sites and is part of the parish of Kilmurry in the Roman Catholic Diocese of Cork and Ross. Though the population of the village is predominantly Roman Catholic, it has a Church of Ireland church, but no Catholic church.

== Geography ==
The village of An Eatharlach (The Glen) is situated in Kilbonane, Muskerry East, in south County Cork. It lies between Cork City and Macroom - each being approximately 20 km away. Cloughduv and Crookstown are 4 km and 6.5 km respectively to the west, Farran 3.5 km to the north and Killumney 5 km at the Cork and Ballincollig side. The village of Aherla sits between the hills that frame the Bride River valley.

== Notable people ==
Notable residents from the area have included:

- Daphne Pochin Mould (1920-2014), author and scientist.
- Siobhán McSweeney (born 1979), actress and comedian.
- Eoghan an Mhéirín Mac Cárthaigh (1691–1756), poet and historian.
