= Diarmuid mac Sheáin Bhuí Mac Cárthaigh =

Irish poet

Diarmuid mac Sheáin Bhuí Mac Cárthaigh, Irish poet, died 1705.

Mac Cárthaigh was a Jacobite poet, and a native of County Cork.

== See also ==
- Dónall na Buile Mac Cárthaigh, fl. 1730s–40s.
- Eoghan an Mhéirín Mac Cárthaigh, 1691–1756.
- Liam Rua Mac Coitir, 1675/90?–1738.
- Donnchadh Ruadh Mac Conmara, 1715–1810.
