= Liam Rua Mac Coitir =

Irish poet (died 1738)

Liam Rua Mac Coitir (1675/90?–1738) was an Irish poet.

A Jacobite poet, Mac Coitir was the president of Daimh-scola na mBlarnan, at Blarney.

== See also ==
- Cotter family
- Diarmuid mac Sheáin Bhuí Mac Cárthaigh
- Dónall na Buile Mac Cárthaigh, fl. 1730s–40s.
- Eoghan an Mhéirín Mac Cárthaigh, 1691–1756.
