= Newfoundland English =

Several accents and dialects of Atlantic Canadian English

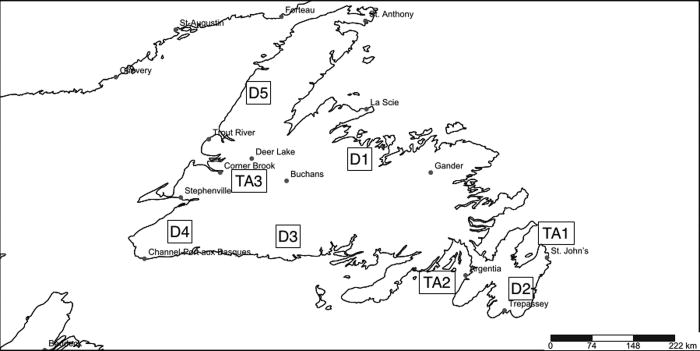
- Dialect zones and transitional areas of Newfoundland
- Native to: Canada
- Region: Newfoundland and Labrador
- Language family: Indo-European: Germanic; West Germanic; Ingvaeonic; Anglo–Frisian; Anglic; English; North American English and British English; Canadian English; Atlantic Canadian English; Newfoundland English
- Early forms: Proto-Indo-European: Proto-Germanic; Proto-West Germanic; Proto-English; Old English; Middle English; Early Modern English; Modern English

Language codes
- ISO 639-3: –
- Glottolog: newf1239
- IETF: en-CA-newfound

Newfoundland English refers to several accents and dialects of Atlantic Canadian English found in the province of Newfoundland and Labrador. Most of these differ significantly from the English commonly spoken elsewhere in Canada and North America, reflecting the province's history and geography. Newfoundland was one of the first areas settled by England in North America, beginning in small numbers in the early 17th century and peaking in the early 19th century. After the 1783 independence of the colonies that formed the United States, Newfoundland remained part of British North America, becoming a Dominion within the British Empire in 1907. It joined Canada in 1949 as the last province to join the confederation.

The dialects of Newfoundland English developed in relative isolation due to the province’s geography. Newfoundland is an island in the North Atlantic Ocean, separated from Labrador by the Strait of Belle Isle. This isolation allowed the dialects to develop independently of those on the North American mainland. Historically, Newfoundland English was first recognized as a distinct dialect in the late 18th century when George Cartwright published a glossary of Newfoundland words. Today, some words from Newfoundland English, such as "b'y" (a form of address), have gained recognition through popular culture in other parts of Canada, particularly in Ontario and eastward.

Newfoundland English shares some linguistic features with Bermudian English, likely due to historical connections between the two regions. Both were part of the See of Nova Scotia until 1839, after which they became part of the Diocese of Newfoundland and Bermuda. The shared ecclesiastical and cultural ties, along with movement between the regions, may have contributed to similarities such as the use of "b'y" in Newfoundland and "bye" in Bermuda.

Newfoundland English is often referred to as Newfinese (also spelled Newfunese). The term Newfie is also used but can be considered pejorative.

Clarke (2005) identifies two major dialect types, based on ancestry: Newfoundland Vernacular Irish English (NVIE) and Newfoundland Vernacular British English (NVBE).

== Influences ==
Much of Newfoundland’s English has been influenced by the languages and dialects of European settlers of the past, such as those who were British, Irish, or French. Also, Indigenous languages prevailed on the island, with some of their influence remains today.

=== British ===
While there was an early dominance of merchants and migrants from Devon, they accounted for only around 30 percent of the English population in places like St. John's and Conception Bay in Newfoundland. Most of the coast, except the Avalon Peninsula, was settled by migrants from Dorset, Somerset, and Hampshire, which Handcock refers to as "Wessex."

A major reason for the migration pattern is that Poole, Dorset became a major port for the Newfoundland fish trade in the mid-1700s, which resulted in settlements that were densely clustered and mainly derived from Devon, Dorset, Somerset, and Hampshire, as these were located near major ports in the West Country of England. That group of migrants accounts for almost 80 percent of all English settlers on Newfoundland.

Ultimately, that has allowed for the preservation of speech patterns derived from the West Country in Newfoundland English. Paddock illustrates how the speech pattern survived in 72 coastal communities in Newfoundland. Specifically, the use of "dark" or "velar" allophone in the communities are phonological features of the West Country. There are regional differences in phonological features. Another preserved phonological feature is the Irish-like fronting for all vowels, which is found in communities on the southern shores of the Avalon Peninsula.

Another speech pattern that is adopted is the conservative paradigm for the verbs "have" and "do" found in the West Country. The verbs "have" and "do" are dependent on their function as auxiliaries or lexical verbs. As auxiliaries, the vernacular paradigm remains uninflected: "he haven't seen her". In contrast, when used as lexical verbs, the "-s" inflection appears throughout the paradigm, as in "they haves/has no business being here" or "we doos [du:z]/does that all the time."

Other forms of preservation are specific terms in vocabulary like "moreish," meaning a particular food of which one cannot help having more, and are still used in Newfoundland.

Newfoundland was a British colony for nearly two centuries until 1949, when it became a province of Canada. That makes Newfoundland English have features similar to those found in the English of the West Country. They include the use of certain vocabulary, grammar, and pronunciation. Newfoundland English has also developed its own distinct features over time, particularly by the influence of Irish and French migrants and its isolation from the rest of Canada.

=== Irish ===
Irish people in Newfoundland fisheries can be traced back to 1675. Approximately half of the population of most settlements on the shores of the Avalon Peninsula was Irish by 1750. The first significant influx of immigrants occurred mainly during the first thirty years of the 19th century. The number of immigrants on the island had grown to 38,000 by 1836, which constituted half of the total population of Newfoundland.

Approximately 85% of Irish immigrants originated from the counties of Kilkenny, Wexford, Waterford, Tipperary, and Carlow, in south-eastern Ireland. The remainder came from western counties, like Cork and Kerry.

Irish migrants inhabited relatively limited areas of the province, primarily in the southern parts of the Avalon Peninsula. Irish and English migrants were divided by their different religious affiliations of Catholicism and Protestantism. There was intermingling of local economics, but those interactions were limited. The geography of the island reinforced the religious division resulted in distinctive and resistant dialects of English in Newfoundland and thus preserved the south-eastern speech patterns of Ireland in Newfoundland.

The speech pattern of using the "after" form of the perfect aspect of the verb has been widely adopted in Newfoundland English. That particular construction, as in "look what I'm after doin' now!", has quickly spread throughout the region, despite the existence of several other alternatives such as "I've done," "I've adone," and "I bin done," which come from the West Country.

Another speech pattern that is preserved is the slit fricative [t] variant, a well-known feature of Irish English. The postvocalic /t/ contexts are prevalent in pre-pause positions except before consonants and are commonly used in Newfoundland's Avalon Peninsula. On the other hand, that characteristic is not shared by the Newfoundland settlements from the West Country. In addition, the monophthongal /e/ and postvocalic /l/ pronunciations are inherited from the Irish and are mainly used today by older Irish ethno-religious people.

=== French ===
French settlement influences are prevalent in the Bay d’Espoir and Port au Port Peninsula on the west coast of the island. Newfoundland French was deliberately discouraged by the government of Newfoundland in the public schools during the mid-20th century, and only a small handful of people, who are mainly elderly, still fluently speak the French-Newfoundland dialect. In the last couple of decades, many parents in the region have demanded and obtained Canadian French education for their children, but that would be Standard French education and does not represent a continuation of the old dialect per se.

Also, some people living in the Codroy Valley, on the southwestern tip of Newfoundland, have ancestors who were francophone but represent Acadian settlers from Canada's Maritime Provinces. They arrived during the 19th century and have lost the French language as well.

=== Indigenous ===
Most of the Indigenous influence within Newfoundland English has been assimilated and forgotten under colonialism. The Beothuk, the Indigenous people of the island, whose language and people were eradicated in the 19th century, have had bits and pieces of their vocabulary poorly transcribed. None of it is used in today’s vernacular.

A scarce number of Indigenous terms are still used in Newfoundland’s lexis and are influenced by the Innu, Mi’kmaq, and Inuit peoples. For example, the term tabanask, a term from the Innu language, refers to a toboggan. Also, the term babbish refers to stretched animal hide used in snowshoes. Sina refers to the edge of a floating ice field and is from the Inuit language.

== Phonology ==
=== Consonants ===
==== Th-stopping ====
A notable feature of Newfoundland English, deriving from Hiberno-English, is the fortition of the fricative sounds /ð/ and /θ/ to become plosives [d] and [t], respectively, a process known as th-stopping. For example, "that thing over there" becomes "dat ting over dere". One study of the Petty Harbour dialect showed that men tend to have /ð/ stopping more often than women within this region, but that is not the case with function words like "this, them, that, these." Middle-aged women were found to start /ð/-stopping when they say function words, which would thus change to "dis, dem, dat, dese."

==== Slit fricative /t/ ====
A feature found only in dialects of the Avalon Peninsula, also deriving from Hiberno-English, is the lenition of the phoneme /t/ to [t̞] (called a slit fricative) after vowels (postvocalic) and when not preceding consonants (non-preconsonantal). This is the opposite process as the th-stopping described above. This sound is similar to /s/, but with less of the high-pitched "hissing" sound characteristic of /s/.

==== Voiced fricatives ====
The modification of initial voiceless fricatives to voiced fricatives can be heard by those in the West Country region (the Northeast, South, and West Coasts and Labrador). Voiceless fricatives, such as /f/ and /s/, are often modified to their voiced fricative counterparts, /v/ and /z/ respectively. Terms like salt and fir thus change to zalt and vir as a result of that shift. Those speech patterns are less prominent today but survive in pockets in the West Country regions.

==== Simplified consonant clusters ====
The West Country is known to remove the last consonant of clusters in their speech. Terms like loft, bald, and almost are simplified to like lof, bal, and almos.

==== H-dropping ====
Both h-dropping and h-insertion occur in the West Country, and in many varieties of Newfoundland English. For example, Holyrood becomes Olyrood, and Avondale becomes Havondale.

==== Rhoticity ====
Newfoundland is mainly rhotic, like the rest of North America, and in Ireland and the West Country. Some non-rhoticity is found in some regions.

==== L-darkness ====
Some speakers of Newfoundland English pronounce /l/ as unvelarized and so the phrase sell it later is pronounced [ˈsɛl ɨθ̠ ˈleɪθ̠ɚ] (cf. General American [ˈsɛɫ ɨʔ ˈɫeɪɾɚ]). That may be from Irish-influenced varieties of English since they have light variants in both coda and onset positions.

==== Pulmonic ingressive ====
Speakers of Newfoundland English, especially older speakers, often pronounce the affirmative yeah with an inward airstream.

Similar forms of ingressive speech are also observed in the local Christmas folk tradition of Mummering, where it is used to obfuscate the identity of the speaker.

=== Vowels ===
In much of Newfoundland, the words fear and fair are homophones. A similar merger is found in the Norfolk dialect of East Anglia, England, and in New Zealand English.

Newfoundland English traditionally lacked Canadian raising, but that has changed to some extent in the generations since Newfoundland's 1949 joining Canada. People in the Avalon Peninsula, which underwent Irish settlement, display obvious Canadian raising pattern for /ɑɪ/ but not typically for the /ɑʊ/ diphthong. The latter feature has long existed in Newfoundland English but is not very common except in the rural South Coast community of Newhook. There, it exists in the speech patterns of more women than men.

In some (typically Irish) dialects of Newfoundland English, there is a complete merger of /ɪ/ and /ɛ/ (a pin–pen merger), usually realized with [ɪ] (in words like bit and bet) but with [ɛ] before /r/ (in words like beer and bear).

=== Tempo ===
Speakers of Newfoundland English may seem to speak faster than other Canadian English speakers. The perceived tempo difference may be a coupling of obvious pronunciation differences with Newfoundland's unusual sayings and is a contributing factor to the difficulty that outsiders sometimes experience with understanding the dialect.

== Grammar ==
=== "After" past ===
In a move that was almost certainly taken from Hiberno-English and influenced by the Irish language, Newfoundland English avoids using the verb "to have" in past participles and prefers formulations with "after" such as "I'm after telling him to stop" instead of "I have told him to stop." That is because Irish has no verb "to have" but more particularly has a construction using the words Tar éis (meaning "after") to convey the sense of having just done something: Táim tar éis é a dhéanamh means "I am just after doing it" or "I have just done it." Possession in Irish would be indicated by Ta ... agam, literally "... is at me."

=== Northern Subject Rule ===
Newfoundland English often follows the Northern Subject Rule, a legacy of settlement from southeastern Ireland, which in turn was influenced by the Anglo-Irish settlement from Northern England into Ireland. For example, the verb "to fly" is conjugated for third-person plural as "the birds flies." According to a 2011 study by Philip Comeau, that feature of Newfoundland English differs from the rule of dialects in Northern England because Newfoundland uses it as a marker of habitual aspect or verb stativity.

=== Archaic pronouns ===
"Ye" is the plural form of "you" (singular) instead of you (plural), similar to how "you guys" is often used to replace "you" (plural) in Standard Canadian English. For example, when addressing two or more people, or when addressing one person but referring to everyone accompanying a person is, Newfoundland English uses "What do ye think?" instead of "What do you guys think?" Alternately, "What do you think?" is used to refer to a single person. That avoids the confusion of other English dialects in which a group of people would not know whether the speaker is inquiring about only the opinion of the person who is being speaking or the various opinions of the entire group. In most areas of Newfoundland that use the pronoun, such as the Avalon Peninsula outside St. John's, "ye" mirrors the same variant in Hiberno-English in which "you" (singular), "you" (plural), and "they" correspond to "you," "ye," and "dey." The last arises simply from a change in pronunciation and so it is written "they," but the other words are pronounced as in Standard English. Variants of "ye" are also used such as "yeer" (your), "yeers" (yours), and "yeerselves" (yourselves). In some communities on the Northeast Coast, "you" (singular), "you" (plural), and "they" correspond to "ye," "dee," and "dey," respectively.

=== Habitual aspect using "be" ===
The word "bes" [biːz] is sometimes used in place of the normally-conjugated forms of "to be" to describe continual actions or states of being, as in "that rock usually bes under water" for "that rock is usually under water," but the normal conjugation of "to be" is used in all other cases.

"Does be" is a calque of Irish grammar into English. Since there is no habitual aspect in English, Irish speakers learning English would say "does be" as a literal translation of bíonn mé "I (habitually) am".

=== "Me" for "my" and "mine" ===
Use or ownership in Newfoundland English is characterized by pronouncing "my" as "me," which is common also in Ireland, Scotland, Northern and Western England, and some dialects in Australia. Before the Great Vowel Shift, "my" was pronounced /miː/, "mine" as /miːn/, and "me" as /meː/. As with all other sound shifts, not all possible words have been changed in the other dialects that were noted. An example in Newfoundland is "Where's me hat?" for "Where's my hat?"

=== Use of "to" for location ===
The use of "to" to denote location is common in Newfoundland English by using "where's that to?" Replacing the standard "where's that?" is a usage comes from the West Country and is still common in southwestern England, particularly in Bristol.

== Expressions ==
Archaic adverbial intensifiers are preserved in Newfoundland such as that play was right boring and that play was some boring for "that play was very boring". They have been retained also in Northern England such as in the Yorkshire dialect and in Geordie and are sometimes heard in the Maritime Provinces of Canada.

Newfoundland English is not homogeneous and varies markedly from community to community and from region to region, which reflects both ethnic origin and relative isolation. For many decades, Newfoundland had very few roads connecting its many communities. Fishing villages, in particular, remained very isolated.

In Newfoundland English, it is typical for a response to a metaphorical question like How's she cuttin'? with a dry literal response. A proper response to the foresaid question would be Like a knife. Or perhaps How ya gettin' on? To which the response might be Same way I gets off! The question/greeting is a phrase still current in the Irish Midlands and North but is rarely, if ever, responded to with such a literal answer there.

In recent years, the most commonly-noted Newfoundland English expression might be Whadd'ya at? (What are you at?), loosely translated to "How's it going?" or "What are you doing?" Coming in a close second might be "You're stunned as me arse, b'y;" it implies incredible stupidity or foolishness in the person being spoken to.

Other local expressions include:

- Eh, b'y (also spelled 'Aye b'y' and 'ay b'y', and sometimes said as 'yes b'y): shortened form of "yes, boy." It's a term used to agree with what someone is saying. Can be used sarcastically.
- Yes, b'y: Yes boy. It is an expression of awe or disbelief. Also commonly used sarcastically to mean yeah right. It is similar to "eh, b'y."
- Where ya to?: Where are you?
- Stay where you're to/at till I comes where ya're at/to.: Wait there for me
- Get on the go: Let's go. It is also a common euphemism for partying. on the go by itself can also refer to a relationship – similar to a dating stage, but more hazy. The term also refers to drinking ("gettin on the go tonight" – going out drinking tonight)
- Havin' a time: having fun
- You knows yourself: Responding to statement in agreement.
- What are ye at?, or Wadda ya'at b'y?: How are you doing, or sometimes What are you doing?
- Wah?: what?
- What's after happenin' now? : What happened? (used when someone seems distraught or emotional)
- Havin' a yarn: Used to refer to a group telling a long story or having a long conversation.
- Luh!: Look! (Also used the same way as "Lo", to draw attention to something or somewhere)
- G'wan b'y!: Literally, "go on, b'y/boy?" Can be used as a term of disbelief or as sarcasm, like the term "No, really?"
- Hows you gettin' on, cocky?: "How are you today?"
- You're a nice kind young feller: "You are a nice young boy"
- Me Son: a term of endearment, like "my friend" or "my bud."
- Me ol' cock: another term of endearment like "my friend," "me son," or "my bud."
- You're some crooked: You are grouchy
- He[she/dey] just took off:, They left recently/quickly. Whether or not it denotes time depends on use of the word "just;" by not including "just" denotes speed, whereas using "just" denotes time.
- Mudder or me mudder: mother
- Fadder or me fadder: father
- Contrary: Difficult to get along with.
- After: "have." For example, "I'm after sitting down" for "I have sat down." it is also used like "trying" (i.e.: whaddya after doin' now?, "what have you done?")
- Oh me nerves: an expression of annoyance
- Ducky: female friend or relative, used affectionately. This is commonly used in the English Midlands but is used for both genders.
- My love: female friend or relative
- Batter: Leave/begone. Typically used in the form of the phrase "Batter to Jesus." It can also be used as "Take that (object) away from here", in the form of "Batter that"
- My treasure: female friend or relative. These three terms are used platonically.
- Rimmed/Warped: to be deformed or distorted in an unusable fashion. Often used to describe someone who is seen upon as weird or an outcast (i.e., She's rimmed, b'y).
- Right: synonym for "very;" i.e.: "She's right pretty."
- Scrob/Scrawb: a scratch on one's skin, likely from the Irish "scríob" (i.e.: "The cat gave me some scrob, b'y" falling into disuse in lieu of "scratch")
- Gets on/Getting on, used to refer to how a person or group behaves (i.e. "You knows how da b'ys gets on" / "How's she getting on?")
- On the go, To have something processing ("I've got an application on the go") or be in a relationship ("He's got some missus on the go")
- Can't do 'ar ting when ya got nar ting ta do 'ar ting wit. – "You can't do anything when you have nothing to do anything with." ['ar – any, opposite of nar (from nary, as in "nary a one" – not a one)]

(Some examples taken from A Biography of the English Language by C.M. Millward)

Also of note is the widespread use of the term b'y as a common form of address. It is shorthand for "boy", (and is a turn of phrase particularly pronounced with the Waterford dialect of Hiberno-Irish) but is used variably to address members of either sex. Another term of endearment, often spoken by older generations, is me ducky, used when addressing a female in an informal manner, and usually placed at the end of a sentence which is often a question (Example: How's she goin', me ducky?) – a phrase also found in East Midlands British English. Also pervasive as a sentence ending is right used in the same manner as the Canadian eh or the American huh or y'know. Even if the sentence would otherwise be a non-question, the pronunciation of right can sometimes make it seem like affirmation is being requested.

Certain words have also gained prominence amongst the speakers of Newfoundland English. For instance, a large body of water that may be referred to as a "lake" elsewhere may often (but not uniformly) be referred to as a "pond." In addition, a large landmass that rises high out of the ground, regardless of elevation, is referred to unwaveringly as a "hill," but there is a difference between a hill and a big hill.

Another major characteristic of some variants of Newfoundland English is adding the letter 'h' to words that begin with vowel sounds or removing 'h' from words that begin with it. In some districts, the term house commonly is referred to as the "ouse," for example, and "even" might be said "h'even." The idiom "'E drops 'is h in 'Olyrood and picks en up in H'Avondal." is often used to describe that by using the neighbouring eastern towns Holyrood and Avondale as examples. There are many different variations of the Newfoundland dialect depending on geographical location within the province. It is also important to note that Labrador has a very distinct culture and dialect within its region.

== Other ==
Although it is referred to as "Newfoundland English" or "Newfinese", the island of Newfoundland is not the only place which uses the dialect. Some southerly areas of Labrador and an area near the Labrador border, the mostly English-speaking Basse-Côte-Nord of Quebec, also use it. Younger generations of the area have adapted the way of speaking, and created some of their own expressions. Some older generations speak Newfoundland English, but it is more commonly used by the younger generations. B'y is one of the most common terms used in the area.

It is also common to hear Newfoundland English in Yellowknife; Southern Alberta; and Fort McMurray, Alberta, where many Newfoundlanders have moved or commute regularly for employment. Newfoundland English is also used frequently in the city of Cambridge, Ontario because of the high population of Newfoundlanders there, most of whom are from Bell Island.

== See also ==
- Newfoundland Irish
- List of communities in Newfoundland and Labrador
- List of people of Newfoundland and Labrador
- Highland English
- Manx English

== Works cited ==
- "CBC Archives." CBCnews. CBC/Radio Canada, n.d. Web. 21 May 2019.
- "Comedian Says Memorial University Taking His Catch Phrase | CBC News." CBCnews. CBC/Radio Canada, 19 July 2012. Web. 21 May 2019.
- "Dictionary of Newfoundland English." Dictionary of Newfoundland English Search. N.p., n.d. Web. 21 May 2019.
- "Do Be Doing Be's: Habitual Aspect in Irish English." Sentence First. N.p., 12 May 2015. Web. 21 May 2019.
- "Great Vowel Shift." The History of English – Early Modern English (c. 1500 – c. 1800). N.p., n.d. Web. 21 May 2019.
- Higgins, Jenny. "Scottish in NL." Scottish in NL. N.p., n.d. Web. 21 May 2019.
- "Language." Language. N.p., n.d. Web. 21 May 2019.
- McCafferty, Kevin. "'[T]hunder Storms Is Verry Dangese in This Countrey They Come in Less than a Minnits Notice...' The Northern Subject Rule in Southern Irish English." The Northern Subject Rule in Southern Irish English | Kevin McCafferty. John Benjamins Publishing Company, n.d. Web. 21 May 2019.
- "Newfie English Dictionary." Largest Source of Internet Humour, Eh! N.p., n.d. Web. 21 May 2019.
- "Newfoundland." IDEA International Dialects of English Archive. N.p., n.d. Web. 21 May 2019.
- "ON THE ROAD WITH ANN – In Search of the Newfoundland Soul | Convivium." Archive.is. N.p., 19 Jan. 2013. Web. 21 May 2019.
- "Sponsored Settlement: The Colonization of Newfoundland." Sponsored Settlement: The Colonization of Newfoundland. N.p., n.d. Web. 21 May 2019.
- Statistics Canada. "Population by Selected Ethnic Origins, by Province and Territory (2006 Census)." Population by Selected Ethnic Origins, by Province and Territory (2006 Census). N.p., 28 July 2009. Web. 21 May 2019.
- "The Proper Spelling of the Newfoundland Slang "B'." GregPike.ca. N.p., 30 July 2009. Web. 21 May 2019.
- "The West Country." West Country. N.p., n.d. Web. 21 May 2019.
- Wells, John C. (1982). Accents of English. Vol. 1: An Introduction (pp. i–xx, 1–278), Vol. 2: The British Isles (pp. i–xx, 279–466), Vol. 3: Beyond the British Isles (pp. i–xx, 467–674). Cambridge University Press. doi:10.1017/CBO9780511611759, doi:10.1017/CBO9780511611766. ISBN 0-52129719-2, 0-52128540-2, 0-52128541-0.
- "同志社大学附属 同志社国際学院 Doshisha International Academy." 同志社大学附属 同志社国際学院 Doshisha International Academy. N.p., n.d. Web. 21 May 2019.
