= Daphne Pochin Mould =

Irish photographer and journalist

- Born: Daphne Desiree Charlotte Pochin Mould; 15 November 1920; Salisbury, England
- Died: 29 April 2014 (aged 93); Aherla, County Cork, Ireland
- Occupation(s): Writer, Photographer
- Known for: Photography, broadcasting, writer and pilot

Dr Daphne Desiree Charlotte Pochin Mould (15 November 1920 – 29 April 2014) was a photographer, broadcaster, geologist, traveller, pilot and Ireland's first female flight instructor. She had a strong interest in archaeology and took thousands of oblique aerial photos across most of southern Ireland. The collection created is private but is catalogued and some photos may be available.

== Life and work ==
Pochin Mould was born in Salisbury in England near Stonehenge in 1920. She studied geology in Edinburgh during the war. In 1946 she received her PhD in geology from the University of Edinburgh for her thesis entitled 'The Geology of the Foyers Plutonic Complex and the surrounding country'. Born into an Anglican family Pochin Mould first became agnostic, determined to attack religion in the name of truth. However, during the writing of one of her early books she converted to Catholicism and became Catholic on 11 November 1950. She moved to Ireland following her conversion and an interest in the Celtic saints and lived in Aherla, County Cork, Ireland subsequently.

Pochin Mould learned to drive at 17 and had an interest in machinery. She learned to fly and found it useful for cataloguing archaeological sites in fields that could be seen from the air. She was a skilled pilot, and joined the Hibernian Flying Club and Farranfore Flying Club. Through these clubs she was able to rent small planes to conduct lessons, as well as spend more time developing her own skills as a pilot.

In 1993 she received an honorary doctorate from University College Cork when she was described as "a scientist and a free spirit, a courageous pioneer and an outstanding woman warrior". According to the Professor Colm Ó hEocha, President of University College Galway there are three criteria for honorary doctorates from the National University of Ireland (of which Cork is a college):

- The person's achievement must be outstanding
- Irish life must have been enriched by it and
- The conferring of the honorary degree must honour the university as well as the person.

In 2004, Pochin Mould wrote a letter to the Irish Times concerning the woman’s role in the catholic church. In the letter, she criticised their treatment, describing it as "third-world" and arguing that Jesus taught Catholics to "do this in memory of me" without adding "but only if you are a man."

Daphne Pochin Mould died at Aherla, County Cork, on 29 April 2014.

== Published works ==
=== Books ===
- Discovering Cork (1991)
- Valentia : Portrait of an Island (1978)
- Aran Islands (1977)
- Mountains of Ireland (1976)
- Captain Roberts of The Sirius (1988)
- The Monasteries of Ireland: An Introduction (1976)
- Ireland; From the Air (1973)
- A book of Irish saints and Irish saints' names (1965)
- Saint Finbar of Cork (1965.)
- Saint Brigid (1964)
- Whitefriars Street Church. A Short Guide (1964)
- The Irish saints: Short biographies of the principal Irish saints from the time of St. Patrick to that of St. Laurence O'Toole (1964)
- The Second Vatican Council (1963)
- Angels of God: their rightful place in the modern world (1963)
- The Lord is Risen: The Liturgy of Paschal Time (1960)
- Peter's boat: A convert's experience of Catholic living (1959)
- The Irish Dominicans: The Friars Preachers in the History of Catholic Ireland (1957)
- Irish pilgrimage (1957)
- The Celtic saints, our heritage. (1956)
- Mountains of Ireland (1955)
- Ireland of the Saints (1953)
- West Over Sea (1953), (1999)
- The Rock of Truth (1953)
- Scotland of the Saints (1952)
- The Roads From the Isles: a Study of the North-West Highland Tracks (1950)

=== Articles ===
- Wooden ships and iron men (2011)
- Timber (2010)
- Brother Gerard of Taizé Miscellany of Creative Writings. (1997)
- IRELAND OF THE WELCOMES MAGAZINE (1974)
- Monte Sant'Angelo perched between rock and sky (1958)
- The Geology of the Foyers "Granite" and the Surrounding Country Geological Magazine / Volume 83 / Issue 06 / December 1946, pp 249–265
