= Goalkeeper (Gaelic games) =

Position in Gaelic games

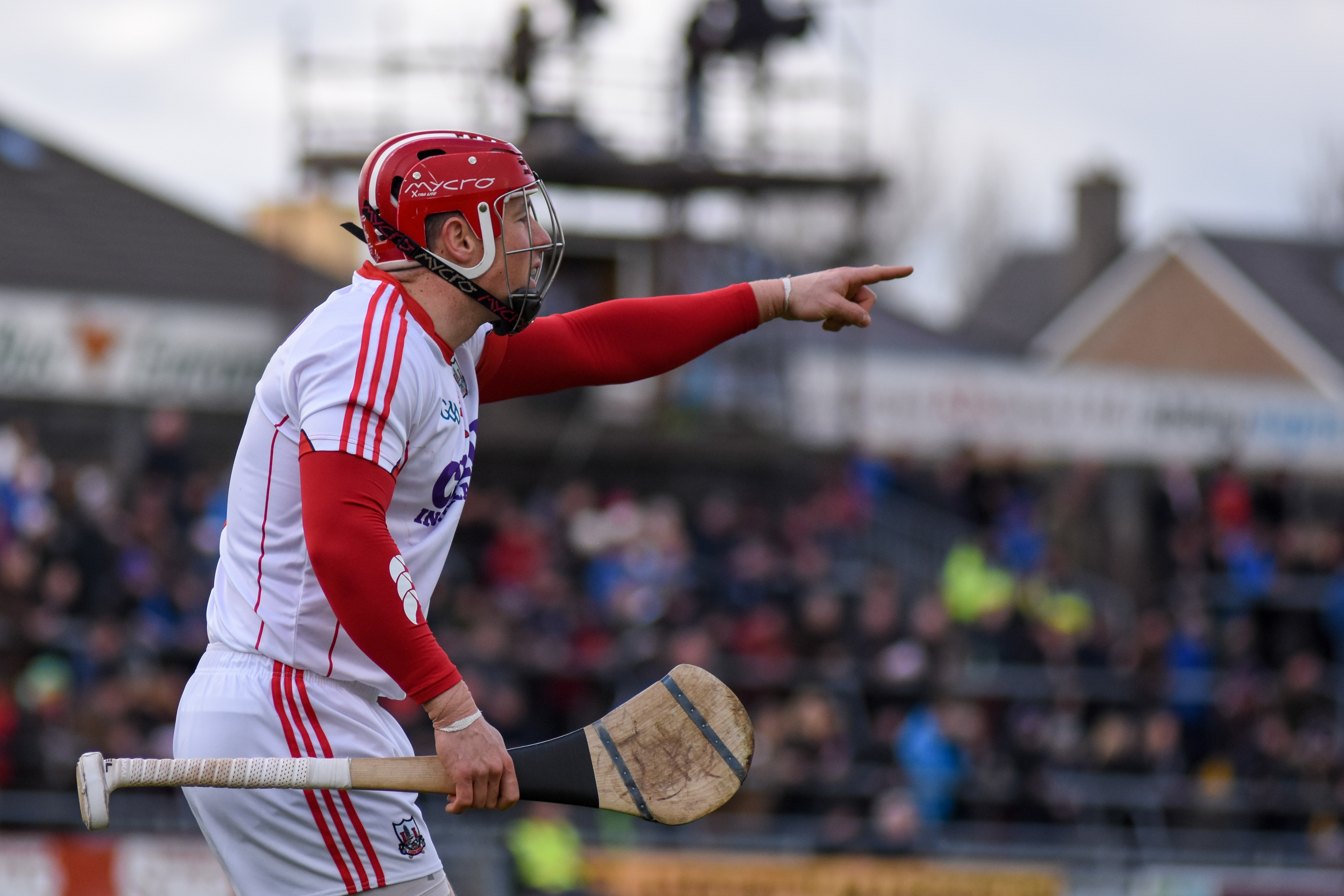
Former Cork hurling goalkeeper Anthony Nash

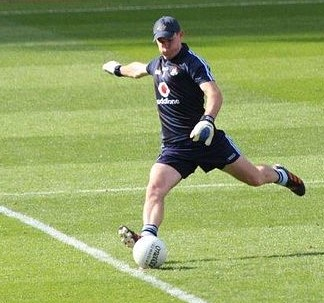
Dublin football goalkeeper Stephen Cluxton holds the record for most All-Ireland titles of any goalkeeper (9) and is the only goalkeeper to be named Footballer of the Year.

In Gaelic games, the goalkeeper (Irish: cúl báire, báireoir) is the player responsible for defending the goal — the area between the goalposts and below the crossbar. Conceding a goal results in the attacking team being awarded three points, in contrast to the single point awarded for a score over the crossbar. The position exists in Gaelic football, hurling, and camogie, though its responsibilities and rules differ between the codes.

Originally similar in function to goalkeepers in other sports such as association football and hockey, the Gaelic games goalkeeper has, in recent years, become a more versatile and tactically significant role. Goalkeepers are now often expected to contribute to both defensive and attacking phases of play. The position is also governed by a set of rules distinct from those that apply to outfield players.

== Origins ==
Gaelic games were first formally codified in the late 19th Century, following the foundation of the Gaelic Athletic Association (GAA) in 1884. While hurling — and by extension, camogie — is rooted in ancient Irish traditions, Gaelic football is a comparatively modern game. Its development is believed to have drawn influence from various mob-football codes that were popular across Europe in the eighteenth and nineteenth centuries.

In the original rules of Gaelic football and hurling, a goal was valued more highly than any number of points. This led teams to prioritise goal attempts over point-scoring. In 1892, the rules were amended to assign a numerical value to goals, initially set at five points, and later revised to three points in 1896 — the system still in place today. An abandoned FRC rule was set to change the value to four points in 2025.

== Responsibilities ==
The goalkeeper’s central responsibility is to prevent the opposing team from scoring a goal. Given that goals are worth three points, they can significantly influence the outcome of a match, both in terms of scoring and psychological momentum.

Goalkeepers also take kick-outs (in Gaelic football) or puck-outs (in hurling and camogie), which are used to restart play after a score or wide ball. The range and accuracy of a goalkeeper’s kick-outs are often used as key performance indicators in post-match analysis.

In modern Gaelic football, goalkeepers may also act as sweepers or auxiliary defenders, particularly when teams employ defensive systems such as the blanket defence. This has led to a tactical shift, where goalkeepers are expected to have advanced foot-passing, positional awareness, and composure under pressure.

== Rules ==
There are several specific rules which apply only to goalkeepers:

- A goalkeeper may lift the ball directly from the ground and touch it with their hands while inside the small rectangle, an area immediately in front of the goalmouth.
- Goalkeepers may not be physically challenged while inside this area.
- Once outside the small rectangle, the goalkeeper is subject to the same rules as outfield players.

In Gaelic football, a rule introduced in 2025 prohibits goalkeepers from receiving a pass from a teammate while both are inside their own half of the pitch. This change, brought in by the Football Review Committee (FRC), aimed to curtail negative or overly defensive play involving recycled possession to the goalkeeper.

Goalkeepers are required to wear a jersey of a different colour to that of their teammates to aid identification. In camogie, however, goalkeepers are not subject to any special rules and are not required to wear distinctive clothing. Some goalkeepers choose to wear peaked caps to block sunlight, though this is not regulated by the playing rules.

In Gaelic football, many goalkeepers wear gloves similar to those used in association football. In hurling, goalkeepers use a hurley with a larger bas (striking area) than those used by outfield players, to aid in stopping and clearing shots on goal.

== Development of the role ==
In recent years, the role of the goalkeeper in Gaelic football has evolved considerably. With the increased use of structured defensive systems and slower build-up play, goalkeepers have become integral to both launching attacks and providing additional defensive cover. This tactical shift has seen the emergence of the so-called "fly goalkeeper" — a player who ventures far beyond their goal area to act as a sweeper or link-player.

Several inter-county teams have fielded players in goal who play outfield for their clubs. Notable examples include Rory Beggan (Monaghan), Ethan Rafferty (Armagh), and Niall Morgan (Tyrone), all of whom are known for their distribution, mobility, and attacking involvement.

The 2025 rule changes have sought to limit the expansion of the goalkeeper's role, particularly by curtailing short passing exchanges in the defensive half. These changes were seen as a response to growing concerns about the pace and spectacle of matches.

== Controversy ==
The evolving role of goalkeepers has not been without criticism. Former Kerry player Darragh Ó Sé attracted controversy in a 2022 column for the Irish Times when he claimed that goalkeepers were not good Gaelic footballers. The remark was met with criticism from both players and pundits, who pointed to the technical and tactical demands of the modern position.
