= Irish Newfoundlanders =

Canadian provincial demographic group

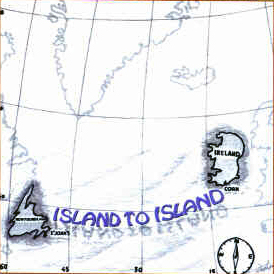
Newfoundland and Ireland

In modern Newfoundland (Irish: Talamh an Éisc), many Newfoundlanders are of Irish descent. According to the Statistics Canada 2016 census, 20.7% of Newfoundlanders claim Irish ancestry (other major groups in the province include 37.5% English, 6.8% Scottish, and 5.2% French). However, this figure greatly under-represents the true number of Newfoundlanders of Irish ancestry, as 53.9% claimed "Canadian" as their ethnic origin in the same census. The majority of these respondents were of Irish, English, and Scottish origins, but no longer self-identify with their ethnic ancestral origins due to having lived in Canada for many generations. Even so, the family names, the features and colouring, the predominance of Catholics in some areas (particularly on the southeast portion of the Avalon Peninsula), the prevalence of Irish music, and even the accents of the people in these areas, are so reminiscent of rural Ireland that Irish author Tim Pat Coogan has described Newfoundland as "the most Irish place in the world outside of Ireland."

== History ==
The large Irish Catholic element in Newfoundland in the 19th century played a major role in Newfoundland history, and developed a strong local culture of their own. They were in repeated political conflict—sometimes violent—with the Protestant Scots-Irish "Orange" element.

These migrations were seasonal or temporary. Most Irish migrants were young men working on contract for English merchants and planters. The exodus from Ulster to the United States excepted, it was the most substantial movement of Irish across the Atlantic in the 18th century.

In 1836, the government in St. John's commissioned a census that exceeded in its detail anything recorded to that time. More than 400 settlements were listed. The Irish, and their offspring, composed half of the total population.

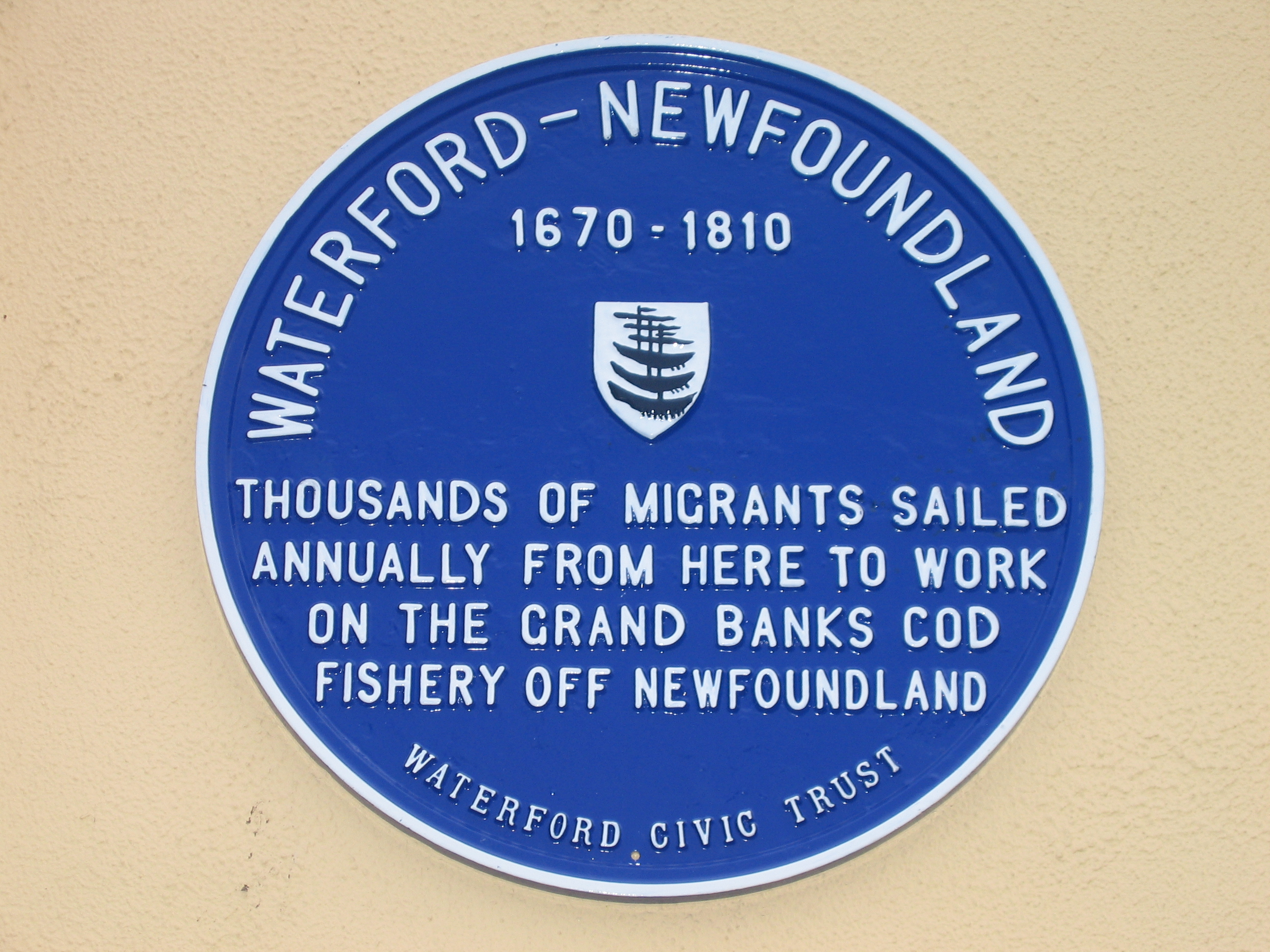
Plaque in Waterford, Ireland

== Language and culture ==
Newfoundland Tricolour

Official flag of the Republic of Ireland

Most Irish emigrants arrived between 1750 and 1830 from strongly Irish-speaking counties, chiefly in Munster. For the decennial period 1771–1781 the number of Irish speakers in a number of those counties can be estimated as follows: County Kilkenny 57%, County Tipperary 51%, County Waterford 86%, County Kerry 93% and County Cork 84%. Newfoundland is one of the few places outside Ireland where the Irish language was spoken by much of the population as their primary language. It is also the only place outside Europe with its own distinctive name in the Irish language, Talamh an Éisc (Land of the Fish). The Munster Irish dialect heavily influenced the distinctive varieties of Newfoundland English.

The form of the Irish language known as Newfoundland Irish was associated with an inherited culture of stories, poetry, folklore, traditional feast days, hurling and faction fighting, and flourished for a time in a series of local enclaves. Irish-speaking interpreters were occasionally needed in the courts. Native speakers are likely to have existed even after the First World War.

To Newfoundland the Irish brought family names of southeast Ireland: Wade, McCarthy, O'Rourke, Walsh, Nash, Houlihan, Connors, Hogan, Shea, Stamp, Maher, O'Reilly, Keough, Power, Murphy, Ryan, Griffin, Whelan, O'Brien, Kelly, Hanlon, Neville, Bambrick, Halley, Dillon, Byrne, Lake and FitzGerald. The many Newfoundlanders with the surname Crockwell (Ó Creachmhaoil) derive from 19th Century immigrants from County Galway, in the west of Ireland. Many of the island's more prominent landmarks having already been named by early French and English explorers, but Irish placenames include Ballyhack (Baile Hac), Cappahayden (Ceapach Éidín), Kilbride and St. Bride's (Cill Bhríde), Duntara, Port Kirwan and Skibbereen (Scibirín).

Despite the Irish elements in the culture of modern Newfoundland, little attention has been given to the (now moribund) local variety of the Irish language. An exception was the work of the local scholar Aloysius (Aly) O’Brien, who died in 2008.

Tuition in Irish (of a kind not specific to Newfoundland) is available at Memorial University of Newfoundland, which every year appoints an Irish language instructor from abroad.

== Religion ==
Religious faith had great institutional importance. Several of the leading Irish merchants and propertied men were Protestants and brought the traditions of the Orange Order to their new home. But the majority of the Irish were Roman Catholics, and they brought with them a version of Catholicism which was strongly marked by belief in fairies, magic, omens, charms and protective rituals. This tended to reduce their dependence on the Church, which seemed to have no monopoly on the supernatural.

With Irish being the language of the majority in the early period, it was often the language of church services. The Catholic Bishop James Louis O'Donel, when requesting a Franciscan missionary for the parishes of St. Mary's and Trepassey, said that such a missionary would need to be fluent in Irish (like O'Donel himself). It also played a part in the greatest early challenge to the Catholic Church, when the Reverend Laurence Coughlan, a Methodist preacher, managed to convert most of the Newfoundland North Shore in the 1760s largely because of his fluency in Irish.

== Rebellion ==
In 1800, a cell of the Society of United Irishmen was uncovered in the St. John's Garrison and planned to rebel against the English authority in the United Irish Uprising, making Newfoundland one of the few places outside Ireland in which the Irish Rebellion of 1798 had political effects.

Even at the time of the Napoleonic Wars, political activism rooted in Irish agrarian movements manifested themselves in Newfoundland, in such forms such as the Caravats (Irish: Carabhataí), who wore French cravates (ties) and the Shanavests (Irish: Seanabheastaí, Seanabheisteanna "Old Vests").

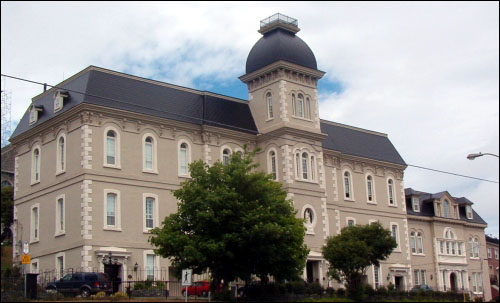
Benevolent Irish Society building, St. Patrick's Hall, St. John's, Newfoundland

== See also ==
- Benevolent Irish Society
- United Irish Uprising
- Irish diaspora
  - Irish Canadians
- Newfoundland (island)
- Dominion of Newfoundland
- Newfoundland and Labrador
- Thomas Nash (Newfoundland) Irish fisherman, settled in Newfoundland Colony. Founder of Branch, Newfoundland and Labrador
