= Dónall na Buile Mac Cárthaigh =

Irish poet

- Occupation: Poet
- Writing career
- Period: 1730s–40s

Dónall na Buile Mac Cárthaigh, Irish poet, fl. 1730s–40s.

Mac Cárthaigh was a member of an ancient Munster dynasty. He was a supporter of the Jacobite cause.

== See also ==
- Kings of Munster
- Kings of Desmond
- Diarmuid mac Sheáin Bhuí Mac Cárthaigh, d. 1705
- Eoghan an Mhéirín Mac Cárthaigh, 1691–1756.
- Liam Rua Mac Coitir, 1675/90?–1738.
- Donnchadh Ruadh Mac Conmara, 1715–1810.
