= Lunenburg English =

Moribund English dialect of Nova Scotia, Canada

- Native to: Canada
- Region: Nova Scotia
- Language family: Indo-European: Germanic; West Germanic; Ingvaeonic; Anglo–Frisian; Anglic; English; North American English; Canadian English; Atlantic Canadian English; Lunenburg English
- Early forms: Proto-Indo-European: Proto-Germanic; Proto-West Germanic; Proto-English; Old English; Middle English; Early Modern English; Modern English

Language codes
- ISO 639-3: –

Lunenburg English is a moribund, German-influenced dialect of English, spoken in the town of Lunenburg and Lunenburg County in the province of Nova Scotia. It is sometimes called "Lunenburg Dutch". The dialect shows unique features in pronunciation, e.g. unusual handling of rhotic consonants, in syntax and vocabulary, which portray the various sociohistorical influences.

== History ==
Lunenburg was founded in 1753. Troops from Braunschweig-Lüneburg settled in Nova Scotia as well as many Germans, some Swiss and French (from Montbéliard). In addition, around 8,000 New Englanders settled in Nova Scotia between 1759 and 1768; they also had a great influence upon the dialect in the county.

Although German emigrants at this time were mostly from the Electoral Palatinate and Württemberg, the town Lüneburg where the name originates from was in the Electorate of Brunswick-Lüneburg. That might be caused by some German veterans who had been in the King's service. During the early years of the settlement German, French, and English were all spoken privately and in church. However, French died out first, while German prevailed longer. The majority of the Lunenburg settlers belonged either to Lutheranism or Calvinism. Several Lutheran churches used German for sermons and received German-speaking clergy from Germany or Pennsylvania, United States, until the end of the 19th century. Thus, the Lutheran church helped to preserve the language in public use.

German was more commonly used in the countryside than in the town itself. Most families who used German in the town were engaged in farming or simple labour. It is no longer spoken in the town. The ninth census of Canada, in 1951, revealed that 15,531 out of 33,183 of the population in Lunenburg show a German ethnic background. However, only 78 residents, all of whom presumably came from the oldest generation, listed German as their mother tongue.

Pronunciation in Lunenburg county "is known to be the only mainland White Canadian community to be non-rhotic." That shibboleth, however, cannot be traced back to influence from German since in the 18th century, it was highly rhotic. However, New England speech is non-rhotic, and one suggestion is that the New Englanders who settled seven or eight years after the non-English-speaking Foreign Protestants taught them English and so they greatly influenced the dialect.

== Pronunciation ==
There are several unique characteristics regarding the pronunciation. The most distinctive is that it is nonrhotic and so vowel length is phonemic, like in Australian English. However, some homonyms and some smaller particularities are also limited to the region.

	Front		Central	Back	
	short	long	short	short	long
Close		iː			uː
Near-close	ɪ	ɪː		ʊ	ʊː
Mid	ɛ	ɛː	ə	ʌ	ɔː
Open	æ				ɑː
Diphthongs	eɪ ɑɪ ɔɪ ɑʊ oʊ				

The accent is nonrhotic and so in terms of lexical sets, LETTER is merged with COMMA, NORTH and FORCE are merged with THOUGHT /ɔː/ (making or, oar, and awe homophonous as /ɔː/), and START is merged with PALM /ɑː/. /ɪː/ and /ɛː/ are the NEAR and SQUARE vowels, which are the long versions of KIT and DRESS (and so shared is differentiated from shed only by vowel length: /ˈʃɛːd, ˈʃɛd/). Both CURE and NURSE are rendered /ʊː/, the long counterpart of /ʊ/ as in foot /ˈfʊt/: sure /ˈʃʊː/, curb /ˈkʊːb/. There is word-internal linking /r/, as in story /ˈstɔːriː/ (compare store /ˈstɔː/).

Not all people in Lunenburg still speak that way, especially since younger people tend to reintroduce the etymological /r/. That is caused by the influence of newcomers who come from other parts of the province or from Massachusetts.

The ending points of the diphthongs (as in go /ˈɡoʊ/) tend to be fully close ([ˈɡou]), more similar to syllable-initial [j w] (as in yet and wet) than to [ɪ̯ ʊ̯].

The accent features Canadian raising and so flight [ˈflʌɪt] has a different vowel from fly [ˈflɑɪ], and the noun house [ˈhoʊs] has a different vowel from the verb house [ˈhɑʊz]. The raising is phonemic in the latter case and so the stressed vowel in the former word belongs to the /oʊ/ phoneme (/ˈhoʊs/), and the corresponding verb has /ɑʊ/: /ˈhɑʊz/. In Lunenburg, the phrase about a boat contains two identical stressed and two identical unstressed vowels: /əˌboʊt ə ˈboʊt/, rather than the Standard Canadian English /əˌbaʊt ə ˈboʊt/, with distinct stressed vowels.

=== German influence ===
The non-rhoticity derives from the New England settlers (also proved by the fact that NEAR and SQUARE are monophthongs [ɪː ɛː], rather that opening diphthongs of the [iɐ̯ eɐ̯] type found in German). There are also characteristics in the pronunciation that probably come from the German settlers.

One example is the tendency to pronounce /w/ in witch (including the historical /hw/ in which, which does not exist in Lunenburg) the same as /v/ as in van, which is particular to the Lunenburg County and probably rooted in German, which has only /v/.

Another example is the lack of the dental fricatives /θ/ and /ð/, which are replaced by the alveolar stops /t/ and /d/ (rendering thank and tank homophonous as /ˈtæŋk/).

Sample of a conversation between two people: "De kids vere over der in da woods, gettin inda dis an dat." "Dey never did?" "Yeah, an now dey gone da get some of dem der apples you see." "You don't say?" "no foolin, dey over der now." "Dey brung some of dem apples over heera da day before." "Oh, dey vere some good eatin I bet." "Now look, you make no nevermind, dose vere da best apples I ever did have, dey vas some good." "Oh, here dey come now, dey bedda know da wash der feet off."

The "t" at the end of words is usually silent: "get" becomes "ge."

== Syntax ==
The few syntactical characteristics that are following are now very rare or have slowly stopped being used.

One example is separable verbs, which are very common in German and used in Lunenburg as well.

German: mitgehen ('to go with someone')
Examples: Will you go with? I am going with. Come on with!
German: Abwaschen ('to wash off')
Example: Wash your face off!

Thus, use, once, and with can be found at the end of a sentence.

== Vocabulary ==
Much vocabulary is from German stock, but a few extraordinary New England features are also rare or not used in the rest of southwestern Nova Scotia.

- get awake instead of wake up
- all in the sense of all gone (as in German); for example: My money is all
- /ˈfrɛs/ from German fressen "to eat greedily"
- raised doughnuts have the name /ˈfɑːsnɑːk/ which comes from the German word Fastnacht
- /ˈæpəlsnɪts/: slices of dried apple, /ˈsnɪt/ (singular) derives from the German word Schnitte
- /ˈlɛpɪʃ/ means insipid and derives from the German läppisch

== See also ==
- Canadian English
- Atlantic Canadian English
- Pennsylvania German language
- Rhoticity in English
