= Eoghan an Mhéirín Mac Cárthaigh =

Irish poet (1691–1756)

Eoghan an Mhéirín Mac Cárthaigh (1691–1756) was an Irish poet and historian. Born in Aherla (in the parish or Kilbonane) in County Cork, Mac Cárthaigh was a Jacobite who wrote in support of Charles McCarthy (Cormac Spáinneach Mac Cárthaigh) during the Williamite War in Ireland.

== See also ==
- Diarmuid mac Sheáin Bhuí Mac Cárthaigh, d. 1705
- Dónall na Buile Mac Cárthaigh
- Liam Rua Mac Coitir, 1675/90?–1738.
- Donnchadh Ruadh Mac Conmara, 1715–1810.
