= Atlantic Canadian English =

Dialects of Canadian English

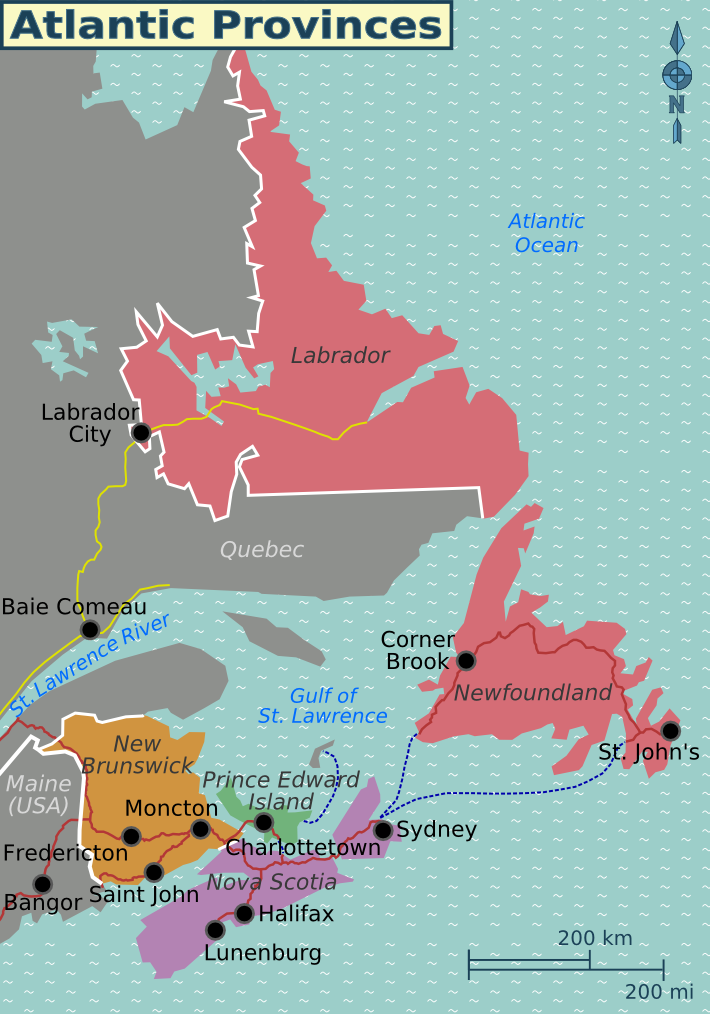
Atlantic Provinces

Speech example
An example of a woman from northern New Brunswick (Lyse Doucet).

Atlantic Canadian English is a class of Canadian English dialects spoken in Atlantic Canada that is notably distinct from Standard Canadian English. It is composed of Maritime English (or Maritimer English) and Newfoundland English. It was mostly influenced by British and Irish English, Irish and Scottish Gaelic, and some Acadian French. Atlantic Canada is the easternmost region of Canada, comprising four provinces located on the Atlantic coast: Newfoundland and Labrador, plus the three Maritime provinces of Nova Scotia, New Brunswick, and Prince Edward Island.

Areas like Miramichi and Cape Breton feature a diverse array of unique phrases and vocabulary that are rarely heard outside their regions. Additionally, the English accent exhibits considerable variation across different population centres.

== History ==
Canadian English owes its very existence to important historical events, especially the Treaty of Paris of 1763. English was first spoken in Canada in the 17th century in seasonal fishing communities along the Atlantic coast, including the island of Newfoundland, and at fur trade posts around Hudson Bay. Treated as a marker of upper-class prestige in the 19th century and the early part of the 20th, Canadian dainty was marked by the use of some features of British English pronunciation, resulting in an accent similar to the Northeastern elite accent known in the United States. Students in school were not permitted to use Gaelic, upon threat of punishment for not using the King's English, and thus Gaelic fell into disuse. The Canadian dainty accent faded in prominence after World War II, when it became stigmatized as pretentious, and is now almost never heard in contemporary Canadian life outside of archival recordings used in film, television, or radio documentaries.

Distinctive regional settlement histories have also created several smaller, less broadly recognized speech enclaves within Canada, which likewise challenge the notion of a unified Canadian English, if not as starkly as the case of Newfoundland. Today, these are found mostly in Nova Scotia, where they include Cape Breton Island (the northern part of Nova Scotia), settled mostly by Scottish Highlanders; Pictou County, a second centre of Highland Scots settlement on the mainland; Lunenburg, a town on the south shore settled largely by Germans; and an African-Canadian community, dispersed among several locations, made up of descendants of the servants who accompanied Loyalist immigrants and of refugees from American slavery.

== Phonology ==
The Atlas of North American English (2006) revealed many of the sound changes active within Atlantic Canadian English, including the fronting of PALM in the START sequence (/ɑːr/) and a mild Canadian raising, but notably a lack of the Canadian Shift of the short front vowels that exists in the rest of English-speaking Canada. Canadian raising means that the diphthongs /aɪ/ and /aʊ/ are raised to, respectively, [ʌɪ] and [ʌʊ] before voiceless consonants like /p/, /t/, /k/, /s/, /f/. In all Atlantic Canadian English, /æ/ (the "short a sound") is raised before nasal consonants. That is strongly true in Nova Scotia's Sydney English specifically, which also features a merger of /æɡ/ and /eɪɡ/ (making haggle sound like Hagel). The merger, typical of Standard Canadian English as well, is not typical of the rest of Atlantic Canadian English, however. Nova Scotia's Halifax English and New Brunswick's Saint John English show /æ/ raising before a few consonants, somewhat reminiscent of a New York accent, but nowhere near as defined (bad has a different vowel sound than bat and back), though Charles Boberg suspects that to be an older recessive feature. Nova Scotia's Lunenburg English may show non-rhotic behaviour, and Nova Scotia English generally has a conservatively-back /uː/ compared with other Canadian English dialects.

Certain Atlantic Canadian English dialects have been recognized by both popular and scholarly publications for distinctly sounding like Irish English dialects. Irish immigration patterns have caused a strong influence of Irish English features in Newfoundland English, Cape Breton English, and some Halifax English, including a fronting of /ɑː/~/ɒ/, a slit fricative realization of /t/, and a rounded realization of /ʌ/. Newfoundland English further shows the cheer–chair merger, the line–loin merger, and a distinct lack of the marry–merry merger, which is the merger of /e/ and /æ/ before /r/.

The varied but similar Maritimer accents are influenced by an overwhelming majority of early Scottish and Irish immigration namely in the regions of Saint John, Miramichi, Cape Breton and parts of Halifax.

=== Maritimes ===
In addition to the above, the English of the Maritime Provinces (New Brunswick, Nova Scotia, and Prince Edward Island) has some unique phonological features:

- Like most other Canadian English, Maritimer English usually contains Canadian raising though to a less extreme degree than the rest of the country. Also, both variants of /aɪ/ can have notably rounded realizations.
- A merger of coach and couch is possible because of the raised variant of /aʊ/ being rounded.
- The flapping of intervocalic /t/ and /d/ to an alveolar tap [ɾ] between vowels, as well as pronouncing it as a glottal stop [ʔ], is less common in the Maritimes than elsewhere in Canada and so "battery" is pronounced [ˈbætɹi] instead of with a glottal stop.
- Especially among the older generation, /w/ and /hw/ are not merged; that is, the beginning sound of why, white, and which is different from that of witch, with, and wear.
- A devoiced and retracted /z/ is traditionally common.

== Lexicon ==
The interrogative "right?" is raised to [ˈɹʌɪt] and is also used as an adverb, as in "It was right foggy today!" That sense may be influenced by Yorkshire dialect "reight" [ˈreit], which means "very, rather, or considerably".

Ingressive speech exists; "yeah" and "no" are spoken by people while they inhale (colloquial pronunciation). That is often referred to as a "Gaelic gasp."

Prince Edward Islanders use more British terms more often than any other Maritimers because of the overwhelming homogeneity of the province's Scottish and Irish ethnicity.

Some Maritimers add an /s/ to the end of "somewhere" and "anywhere" and produce "somewheres" and "anywheres".

== New Brunswick ==
Canada as a country has two official languages: English and French. This is due to the long withstanding history of its colonization and settlement by both France and Britain, as well as the continuation of the French language which was sanctioned by the ruling British authorities at the time. There was no assimilation of English into the francophone population simply due to their solid establishment into the province. According to historians, the consensus is that approximately 15,000 New York Loyalists emigrated and settled into New Brunswick. However, it was not until a wave of 35,000 Loyalists arrived in New Brunswick in 1783 that cemented a substantive English-speaking community, combined with the francophones in creating a larger population, which enabled it to become its own province.

Most of the French settlers in New Brunswick were descendants of Acadians displaced by the Expulsion of the Acadians. The francophones in New Brunswick constitute more than 5% of the francophone population in Canada. Francophones are not outnumbered by the speakers of non-official languages and make up a third of the population, thus making them the only official bilingual province. In comparison to its Maritime neighbours, New Brunswick is considered less anglophone due to its relatively big francophone population.

In a reported merger of couch and coach, observations from Charles Boberg indicate that lower values for the F2 of /awT/ tend to occur in New Brunswick.

=== Variations in vocabulary ===
In New Brunswick, the combination of typical standardized toppings at Canadian pizzerias that includes pepperoni sausage, mushroom, green pepper, tomato sauce, and cheese is referred to as "the works". Additionally, where the term "notebook" is used to describe lined paper that is bound together, in the Maritimes, the type 1 Canadianism scribbler takes over.

== Miramichi accent ==
The Miramichi accent refers to a localized variety of English spoken in and around the Miramichi region of northeastern New Brunswick, Canada. The accent is regarded as distinct from other New Brunswick English dialects and is often associated with the area’s strong Irish and Scottish settlement history dating from the late 18th and early 19th centuries.

Large numbers of Irish immigrants arrived in the region during and after the Great Famine, particularly from County Cork and surrounding areas, while Scottish settlers—many of them Highlanders—established early communities along the Miramichi River. Linguists and regional historians have noted that elements of Irish English and Scottish English contributed to the development of a unique phonology and vocabulary in the area.

The dialect is characterized by pronunciation differences compared to other New Brunswick communities, including vowel shifts, rhotic speech patterns, and intonation reminiscent of Hiberno-English. The accent is also noted for retaining localized terminology and idiomatic expressions derived from Gaelic and Irish English, making the region’s speech immediately recognizable to listeners from elsewhere in the province. Some words and phrases associated with Miramichi speech are not widely used outside the river communities, reinforcing the sense of linguistic identity within the region.

Although the Miramichi accent is less prevalent among younger speakers due to increased mobility, standardized media exposure, and economic migration, it remains a significant marker of regional identity and cultural heritage.

== Nova Scotia ==
The distinct regional differences have led to the creation of less widely recognised speech enclaves in Canada: Nova Scotia, which includes Cape Breton Island (the northern part of Nova Scotia), settled mostly by Scottish Highlanders; Pictou County, a second centre of Highland Scots settlement on the mainland; Lunenburg, a town on the south shore settled largely by Germans; and an African-Canadian community, dispersed among several locations, made up of descendants of the servants who accompanied Loyalist immigrants and of refugees from American slavery.

The town of Lunenberg, in particular, has been a huge influence in Nova Scotia English; its dialect traditionally includes the familiar "all" for "all gone", and a final "ain't" as a request for confirmation. The most distinctive characteristic of Lunenberg speech is the complete absence of /r/ postvocalically. The Lunenberg dialect today is very much like that of the surrounding region along the South Shore of Nova Scotia and bears far greater resemblance to the Yankee New England speech likely spoken by the early planters. Outside of the treatment of /r/, South Shore speech shares many similarities with other parts of the Maritimes owing to its (indirect) English ancestry throughout Atlantic Canada. Contrary to reports of velar /r/, the most distinctive characteristic of Lunenberg speech is the complete absence of /r/ postvocalically, making it much more similar to neighbouring South Shore dialects, so that it is often confused with the speech of New England by outsiders.

== Prince Edward Island ==
The total population of Prince Edward Island is approximately 130,000 – only slightly larger than that of Cape Breton. As with other provinces, PEI's urban population steadily increased throughout the 19th, 20th, and 21st centuries, but at a much slower rate than seen in most other provinces. Between 2001 and 2006, PEI's urban population grew by only 0.8% while its rural population declined by 12.8%. Nevertheless, 45% of PEI's population dwelled in urban areas as of 2016. Along with Canada's Eastern Arctic, PEI is one of the most culturally homogeneous regions in Canada. The overwhelming majority of the Island's population (91.5%) reported English as their mother tongue in the 2016 census, while only 3.8% of the total population reported French. The most commonly reported ethnic origins were Canadian, Scottish, and English. Visible minorities comprise 4.8% of the population, with Chinese, South Asian, and Black people making up the largest visible minority communities. Indigenous people (including First Nations, Métis, and Inuit) make up 2% of the population.

=== Dictionary of Prince Edward Island English ===
The Dictionary of Prince Edward Island English was first published in 1988 by the University of Toronto Press in conjunction with T.K. Pratt, a professor of English at the University of Prince Edward Island. There are approximately 1000 entries of non-standard or dialect words, past and present. The notes by Pratt deal with usage, pronunciation, alternate forms and spellings, and stylistic and regional labels. Much of the increased public interest in Canadian English seen during the past half century emerged from lexicographical work and landmark publications such as the Dictionary of Prince Edward Island English.

Below is a list of words that are distinctive of Newfoundland English found in the Dictionary of Prince Edward Island English:

1. Angishore hangashore (DPEIE Page 5)

n. — Prince Edward Island, A fisherman who is too lazy to fish. Critical term. Someone who didn't want to fish (II 083).

2. Ballast Lath (DPEIE Page 9)

n. — Prince Edward Island, One of the strips of wood on the bottom of a lobster trap that secures the ballast.

3. Cork corker (DPEIE Page 38)

n. — Prince Edward Island, A hired hand on a fishing boat, especially a lobster boat.

4. Grayback (DPEIE Page 68)

n. — Prince Edward Island, A large ocean wave.

5. Hiller Potato Hiller (DPEIE Page 73)

n. — Prince Edward Island, A machine with two rotating discs used to hill or pile soil around potatoes.

6. Kippy Kipper, Dilsey, Trappy (DPEIE Page 86)

verb. — Prince Edward Island, Usually of a woman, well dressed or attractive.

7. Round White (DPEIE Page 123)

n. — Prince Edward Island, Any roundish, white-fleshed variety of potato.

8. Scoff (DPEIE Page 126)

n. — Prince Edward Island, A big meal, often of seafood or other seasonal food and in connection with a party.

9. Slobby Lolly, Slob Ice, Slurry (DPEIE Page 138)

adj. — Prince Edward Island, Of the sea, covered with a dense, slushy, mass of ice fragments, snow, and freezing water.

10. Whitewashed Islander Whitewashed American (DPEIE Page 166)

n. — Prince Edward Island, A Prince Edward Islander who has picked up affected 'foreign' manners, especially in the 'Boston States.'

== Newfoundland ==
The distinctiveness of Newfoundland English derives from a variety of factors: historical, economical and geographic. In the eighteenth century there was a divide between the small managerial class, which consisted of English merchants and agents from Devon, Dorset, and neighbouring counties and laborers, most of whom were Irish. English was transmitted in the families in towns and outports, infused every summer with folk speech from England and Ireland. The 19th century provided a model of educated and cultural English and Anglo-Irish speech due to the governor becoming the focus of a small elite circle in the capital city of St. John's that included naval officers, principal merchants, clergymen, doctors, officials, and a steady stream of educated visitors and scientists. Newfoundland English, especially its common and folk varieties, began to form before many English speakers had settled in the area of present day Canada, and at least 200 years before the Dominion of Canada was created in 1867. Researchers find it difficult to identify specific Canadian pronunciations, intonations, grammatical forms, idioms, or regional vocabulary brought from other provinces to Newfoundland before 1949. Newfoundland's linguistic development has also been influenced by the United States. In the years during, and after, World War II many Newfoundland brides were brought home by American soldiers and consequently established close familial ties in both countries. Other events, such as the establishment of medical and missionary infrastructure in Northern Newfoundland and Labrador by Englishman Dr. Wilfred Grenfell, brought American nurses, teachers, and volunteer college students to northern outports. Thus, these personal relations within families may have resulted in subtle American influences in some regional variants of Newfoundland English.

The following list provides the principal grammatical features of various folk speech types that are in Newfoundland and Labrador as outlined in the Dictionary of Newfoundland English:

1. Nouns after numerals above one have no plural -s. 'Now a cod-trap is about sixty fathom on the round.'
2. Finite verbs in the present tense take -(e)s for all person and numbers: 'I thinks this is unlawful, and as other informs me is onproper and impossible, and this the livi-ers here, all could tell ye.'
3. Only one form is employed for both the past tense and past participle of strongverbs: 'She was gangboarded, fore-cuddy an' after-cuddy on her, and freeze come on they got drove off.'
4. Am, is, and are are employed for an assertion about an event at the present moment, while be's, for all persons, indicates continuous or repeated activity: 'There's a sunken rock. You know when the water's high, that it be's under water.'
5. To have (already) done (something) is not a normal usage, the notion being expressed by to be after doing (something): 'How many times am I after tellin' you?'
6. The unstressed object form for he is un: 'We'd see the sun steady for three months, never lose un.'
7. The stressed forms for the personal pronouns after verbs (including forms of be) and prepositions are /, he, she, we, they: '[Fairies] was only little small people, they used to tell we.' 'He thought to hisself he'd killed the two of 'em [but] 'twasn't they now.' 'Never mind they – let 'em bite.' (The unstressed forms, except for example 6 above, are the same as in standard colloquial English.)
8. Stressed he and she are often used as substitutes for count nouns, but it for mass and abstract nouns like crookedness, fog, weather: 'But the first hour we hauled in the log, and he registered three miles. So the next hour we hauled 'im in again, and she's got another three miles.'
9. Adjectives derived from names of materials end in -en: 'tinnen cup, glassen pole.'
10. For many speakers the plural demonstrative determiners are those with objects and events that are current, and them with objects and events that are past: 'Years ago, not so much, those days, you'd always have a gun line.'

Below is a list of words that are distinctive of Newfoundland English found in the DCHP-2 as well as the Dictionary of Newfoundland English. The definitions are taken from DCHP-2 with a link to the definitions from Dictionary of Newfoundland English (with the exception of 8 and 10, linked to the DCHP-2 definitions):

1.bangbelly bang-belly (DCHP-2 October 2016)

n. — Newfoundland, Food

a pudding, cake, or pancake.

2. Cockabaloo (DCHP-2 April 2016)

n. — Newfoundland

someone who teases; a bully.

3. duckish duckies, duckest (DCHP-2 July 2016)

exp. — Newfoundland, somewhat rare

dusk or twilight.

4. figgy duff Figgy Duff (DCHP-2 October 2016)

n. — Newfoundland, Food

a boiled pudding made with raisins.

5. flahoolach flahoolagh, flooholic, < Gaelic 'flaitheamhlach' (DCHP-2 May 2016)

adj. — Newfoundland

generous, extravagant, or wasteful.

6. jinker joner, jonah, jader (DCHP-2 April 2016)

n. — Newfoundland

a person believed to bring bad luck.

7. mummering mumming (DCHP-2 October 2016)

n. — also attributively, Newfoundland, Social customs

the practice of visiting houses in elaborate costumes and disguises, participating in various group activities over Christmas.

8. screech-in Screech-in, Screech-In (DCHP-2 October 2016)

n. — Newfoundland, Social customs

an informal bonding ceremony in Newfoundland, involving drinking rum and kissing a (dead) fish, usually cod

9. sleeveen sleveen, slieveen, sleiveen, < Irish Gaelic slighbín 'trickster' (DCHP-2 May 2016)

n. — Newfoundland, slang, informal

a sly, mischievous person; a rascal.

10. Jiggs' dinner Jigg's dinner, Jiggs dinner, Jigg's Dinner (DCHP-2 October 2016)

n. — Food, Newfoundland

a dinner of corned beef and cabbage, with potatoes and other vegetables on the side.

== See also ==
- Canadian English
- Languages of Canada
- Newfoundland English
- The Maritimes
- Acadian French
- Acadians
