= Hedge school =

Small informal illegal schools

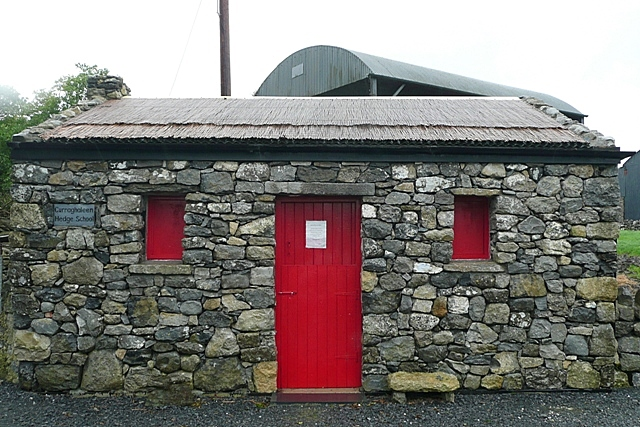
Former hedge school building in Curraghaleen, County Roscommon

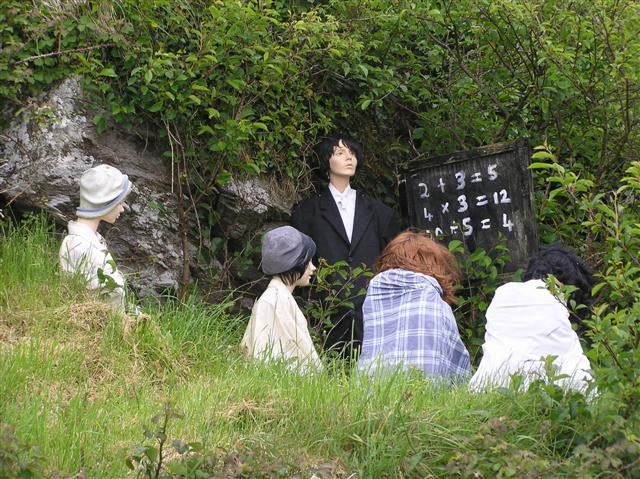
Mannequins showing a re-creation of a hedge school in Doagh Famine Village, County Donegal. In reality, most hedge schools taught indoors

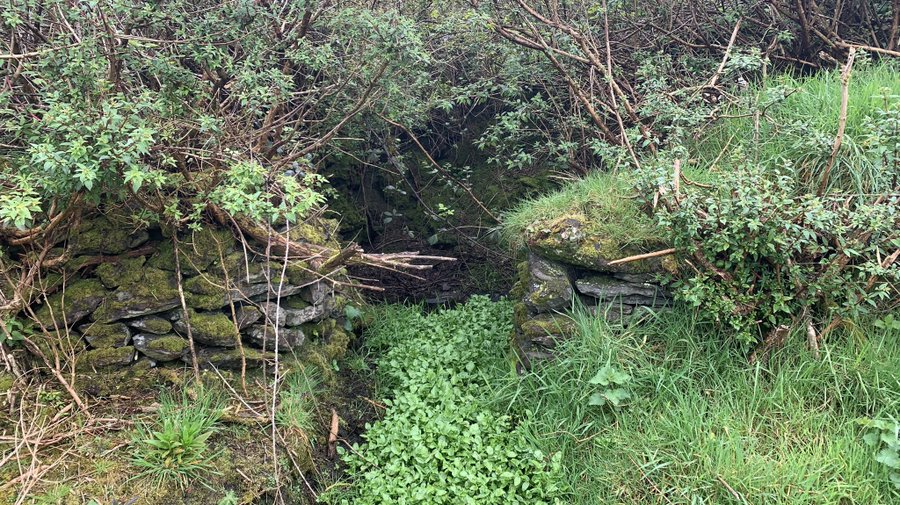
Remains of a hedge school in Ventry, County Kerry

Hedge schools (Irish names include scoil chois claí, scoil ghairid and scoil scairte) were small informal secret and illegal schools, particularly in 18th-century Ireland, teaching the rudiments of primary education to children of 'non-conforming' faiths (Catholic and Presbyterian). Prior to the repeal of the Education Act 1695 (7 Will. 3. c. 4 (I)) by the Roman Catholic Relief Act 1782 (21 & 22 Geo. 3 (I). c. 24 (I)), only schools run by subscribers to the Anglican faith were allowed to operate. Instead, Catholics and Presbyterians set up secret and illegal schools that met in private homes.

== History ==
After the 16th- and 17th-century dispossession, emigration, and outlawry of the Irish clan chiefs and the loss of their patronage, the teachers and students of the schools that for centuries had trained composers of Irish bardic poetry adapted, according to Daniel Corkery, by becoming teachers at secret and illegal Catholic schools, which doubled as minor seminaries for the increasingly illegal and underground Catholic Church in Ireland.

While the "hedge school" label suggests the classes took place next to a hedgerow, when the Penal Laws were relaxed, classes were normally held in a house or a barn. Payment was generally made to teachers per subject, and bright pupils would often compete locally with their teachers, or even be smuggled to mainland Europe, for Catholic higher education at one of the Irish Colleges.

Subjects included the reading, writing, and grammar of both the Irish and English languages, and maths (the fundamental "three Rs"). In some schools, Irish bardic poetry, local history and home economics were also taught. In Munster especially, Greek and Latin were also taught. In Westminster, a parliamentarian complained that "I do not wish to see children [in Ireland] educated like the inhabitants [of Munster], where the young peasants of Kerry run about in rags with a Cicero or Virgil under their arms." Reading was often taught using chapbooks, sold at village fairs and typically filled with exciting stories of well-known rapparees, many of whom were outlawed members of the Gaelic nobility of Ireland who still held to the code of conduct of the traditional chiefs of the Irish clans.

While all Catholic education was forbidden under the penal laws from 1723 to 1782, no hedge teachers are known to have been prosecuted. The penal laws particularly targeted Catholic schools run by religious orders, whose property was routinely confiscated. The laws were intended to force Irish Catholics of all classes to convert to the Protestant Church of Ireland if they wanted a decent education.

Historians agree that the hedge schools provided education, occasionally at a very high level, for up to 400,000 students by the mid-1820s. J. R. R. Adams says the hedge schools testified "to the strong desire of ordinary Irish people to see their children receive some sort of education". Antonia McManus argues that there "can be little doubt that Irish parents set a high value on a hedge school education and made enormous sacrifices to secure it for their children....[the hedge schoolteacher was] one of their own".

Formal schools for Catholics under trained teachers began to appear after 1800. Edmund Ignatius Rice (1762–1844) founded two religious institutes of religious brothers: the Congregation of Christian Brothers and the Presentation Brothers. Both opened numerous schools, which were visible, legal and standardized. Discipline was notably strict.

Hedge schools declined from the foundation of the national school system by the British government in the 1830s. Most of the Catholic bishops preferred the new system, as the new schools would be largely under the control of the Catholic Church and would allow formalized teaching of Catholic doctrine. James Doyle, Bishop of Kildare and Leighlin, wrote to his priests in 1831:

The Roman Catholic bishops welcome the rule which requires that all the teachers are henceforth to be employed be provided from some Model School, with a certificate of their competency, that will aid us in a work of great difficulty, to wit, that of suppressing hedge schools, and placing youths under the direction of competent teachers, and of those only.

A study of hedge schools by Yolanda Fernández-Suárez of the University of Burgos found that hedge schools existed into the 1890s, and suggested that the schools existed as much from rural poverty and a lack of resources as from religious oppression.

After 1900, historians such as Daniel Corkery tended to emphasise the hedge schools' classical studies (in Latin and Greek). Those studies were sometimes taught (based on a local demand) but not in every school.

Fernández-Suárez quoted a Board of Education inspector visiting a school in 1835:

Amazed at the skill of the twelve-year-old boys in reading the new books, and considering the possibility that they were reciting from memory, I invited one of their number to read me a passage from the gospel of Saint Matthew. Evidently the child misunderstood me. He searched in his satchel until he found his tattered book, stood up, and proceeded to read me the account of Christ's passion—in Greek (Local Ireland & Others, 1999).

== In popular culture ==
- Brian Friel's play Translations is set in a hedge school in 1833, and its subject is the defence of Irish culture against a dominant and aggressive British colonialism.
- William Makepeace Thackeray's Irish Sketch Books contain various references to hedge schools.
- William Carleton, who got his own early education in hedge schools, wrote many comedic accounts of them for English audiences, including The Hedge School.

== See also ==
- Richard Gwyn
- Brian Merriman
- Donnchadh Ruadh Mac Conmara
