= Newhook =

Newhook is an English surname. Notable people with the surname include:

- Abby Newhook (born 2003), Canadian ice hockey player
- Alex Newhook (born 2001), Canadian ice hockey player
- Cle Newhook (1943–2018), Canadian Anglican priest and politician
- Frank Newhook (1918–1999), New Zealand botanist
- Hazel Newhook (1914–2016), Canadian politician
- Jim Newhook (1915–1997), New Zealand veterinary academic
