= Bambrick =

Bambrick is a surname. Notable people with the surname include:

- Gertrude Bambrick (1897–1974), American actress of the silent era
- Joe Bambrick (1905–1983), Northern Irish international footballer who played for Chelsea, Walsall, Glentoran, and Linfield
- Valentine Bambrick (1837–1864), recipient of the Victoria Cross for gallantry in the face of the enemy
- Winifred Bambrick (1892–1969), Canadian classical musician and novelist
