= History of hurling =

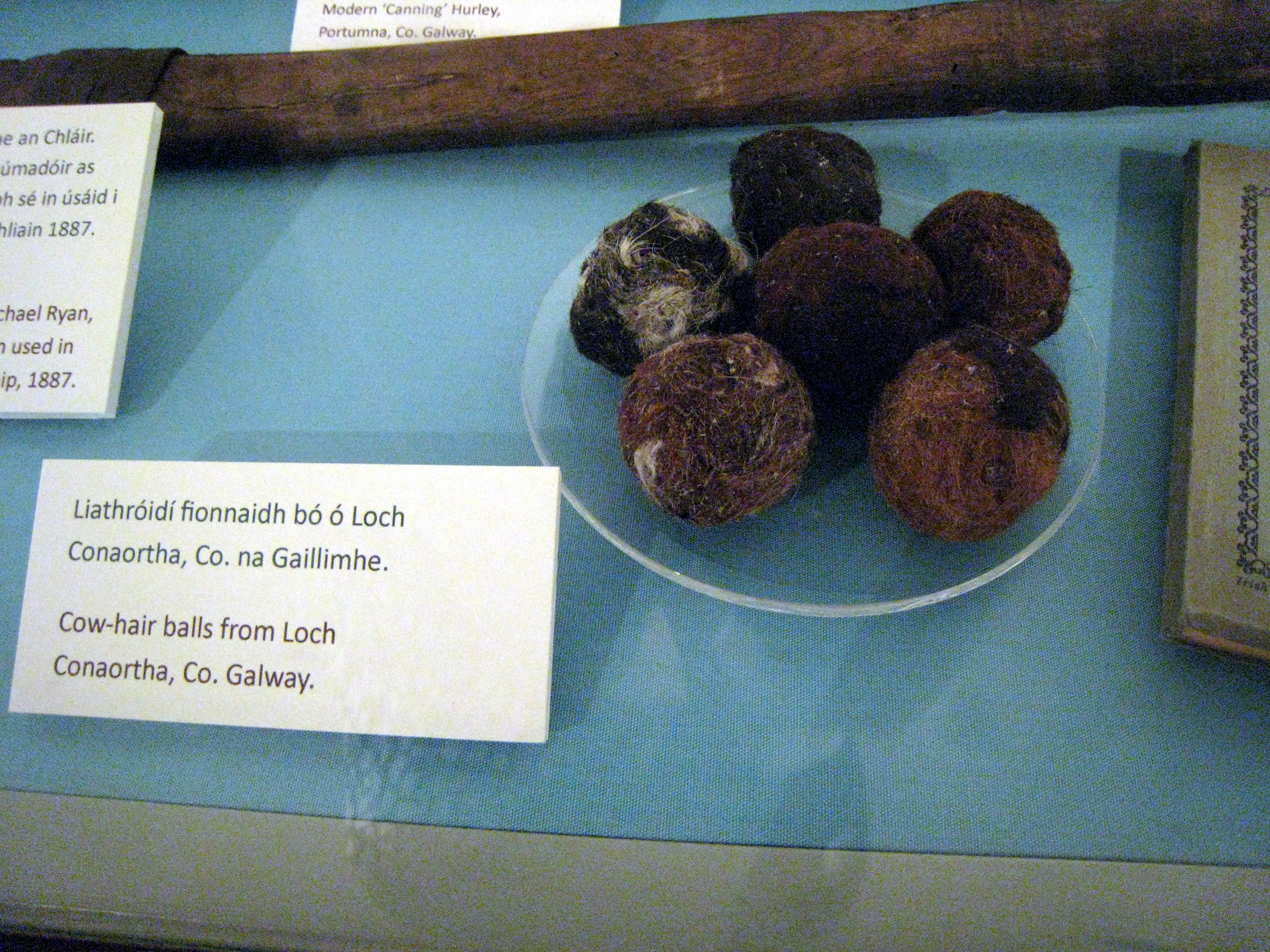
Ancient animal hair balls, part of the exhibition on the History of Hurling, Cork Public Museum

Hurling has a long, but often unclear history, stretching back over three millennia. References to stick-and-ball games are found in Irish mythology. The game is thought to be related to the games of shinty that is played primarily in Scotland, cammag on the Isle of Man and bandy that was played formerly in England and Wales. There is evidence that in ancient times a similar game called Knattleikr was also played in Iceland, with the Icelandic sagas, "suggesting that it was something that was brought from the Gælic area to Iceland".

== Prehistoric and early historic Ireland ==
Hurling is believed by some to be older than recorded history, and to predate the arrival of the Celts. Irish mythological texts date hurling to at least 1272 BC at Cath Maige Tuired, though the earliest archeological evidence dates hurley balls to the latter half of the 12th century The earliest written references to the sport in Brehon law date from the fifth century.

The tale of the Táin Bó Cuailgne (drawing on earlier legends) describes the hero Cúchulainn playing hurling at Emain Macha. Similar tales are told about Fionn Mac Cumhail and the Fianna, his legendary warrior band.

Meallbreatha describes punishments for injuring a player in several games, most of which resemble hurling.

The Seanchás Mór commentaries on the Brehon Law state that the son of a rí (local king) could have his hurley hooped in bronze, while others could only use copper. It was illegal to confiscate a hurley.

== 14th century ==
The Statutes of Kilkenny forbade hurling due to excessive violence, stating further that the Old English settlers of the Pale would be better served to practice archery and fencing in order to repel the attacks of the Irish clans.

== 15th century ==
A 15th-century grave slab survives in Inishowen, County Donegal, dedicated to the memory of a Scottish gallowglass warrior named Manas Mac Mhoiresdean of Iona. The slab displays carvings of a claymore, a caman (for playing shinty as opposed to hurling), and a sliotar.

== 16th century ==
1527: Statute recorded in Galway City: "At no time to use ne occupy ye hurling of ye litill balle with the hookie sticks or staves, nor use no hand balle to play without the walls, but only the great foot balle."

1587: Lord Chancellor William Gerrarde complains that English settlers of the Munster Plantation are speaking Irish and playing hurling.

== 17th century ==
In an article of 1835, the English essayist and poet Leigh Hunt referred to hurling being played in London in the early 1600s ('before the Commonwealth'). The first detailed description of the game in Ireland comes from an English visitor, John Dunton, in 1698, who compared it with the English game of Pall-mall. Teams of 10, 12 or 20 players would hit or carry a ball of animal hair with curved sticks, the aim being to pass it through a hoop in the opponents' area. The first to do so wins. This was often played as a challenge match between different parishes or baronies, and was frequently attended with injuries taken in good part.

== 18th century ==
At this time there were two distinct versions of a game of ball and stick. In the northern part of Ireland, it was called camán (English: commons), and played in the winter. A hard wooden ball, or crag, was struck with a narrow wooden stick, but could not be handled (as in modern shinty). In the southern parts the game was called iomán or báire and played in summer. The ball, or sliothar was made of animal hair, and could be handled or carried on a wider stick (hurl) than used in the north.

The northern game was one of the common people, but the southern game was largely organized by the landlords who provided the hurling greens, picked the teams, typically of 21, and competed against each other for wagers. The game would often be part of much larger entertainment such as fairs and other competitions, and the gentry even participated with their own teams. Crowds of up to 10,000 attended. This region was conveniently supplied with dry level terrain and many ash trees, which became the favoured wood for hurls. The Eighteenth Century has been referred to as "The Golden Age of Hurling."

There were also inter-county hurling matches. The memoirs of Sydney, Lady Morgan, Volume 1, page 41, state:

In the early 18th century the hurling matches in the provinces were the Olympic games of ould Ireland; the athletes of Connaught would challenge the rival hurlers of Munster. County against county, but more frequently Bally against Bally came forth in mutual and picturesque defiance. The first ladies of the neighbourhood frequently presided as umpires; whilst the combatants, whose chief claims were their personal prowess, enlisted in their ranks young men of the first families, as well as the prime youth and manhood of the "mere Irishry". Early in the last century, a celebrated hurling match took place in Connaught, sustained by the gentry, farmers and squirearchy of the neighbouring counties of Sligo and Roscommon. All the chief gentry of the neighbourhood were present, the flower of Irish youth of both sexes. It was the custom to award to the victor of the field a ribbon to wear at his breast, or some other simple mark of distinction, presented by the Queen of Beauty of the day. On this occasion, the Queen of Beauty was Sydney, the orphan grand-daughter of Sir Malby Crofton; the victor of the day was Walter MacOwen, Anglice Owenson, a gentleman according to the genealogy of Connaught, but a farmer by actual position. He was very handsome in person and tall in stature, and of noted prowess in all contests like the present.

As previously described, the game ended with one goal, so could last a few minutes or several hours. However, it was common to have a set of up to 3 games, 2 goals deciding, not necessarily on the same day. The hoop was not at the end of the field and could be approached from either side to score. The báire team typically stood in 3 rows of 7, the front being known as the phalanx or an bulc, heavy men who had different sticks and had different rules of play (similar to hockey in not being allowed to carry the ball or raise the stick high). Effectively they acted as a scrum (cromaiscín), gaining ground with the ball through main force. The second row were known as whips or fuadaigh, and the final row of backs included the captain. These rows had lighter sticks and were permitted to lift them high and carry, but not handle the ball. There was no formal goalkeeper, but this was obviously a major task of the captain. The whips were there to capture any ball which came free, and the backs to deal with any opponent breaking through. One-on-one wrestling was permitted.

The captain was the person who chose the team, and had absolute control over who played where. He was often from the gentry who provided the facilities, so had genuine power over people. A dismissal for dangerous play was effectively a lifetime ban. The two captains acted as joint umpires, though occasionally a third person would be called to adjudicate where they could not agree. This gentlemanly control of the situation meant that injuries seemed to be less common and less serious than in previous times.

== 19th century ==
Political and social changes including the Act of Union 1801 and Great Famine produced a decline in sporting activity and a rift between the landowners and the people so that the game was no longer supported by the gentry. Both versions of the game largely died out, surviving in three pockets around Cork city, south-east County Galway, and north of Wexford.

In 1884 the Gaelic Athletic Association was formed to promote or revive traditional Irish sports. Michael Cusack simplified the game with which he was familiar from childhood in County Clare and thus laid the modern rules based on the iomán version of the game. (Cusack's own efforts to bring teams together from different areas had foundered on lack of agreement of rules.) "Not surprisingly, this new game never caught on in the old 'commons' area, with the Glens of Antrim being the only major exception."

Cusack promoted the game as part of Irish nationalism, and founded the Celtic Times to promote both.

== 20th century ==
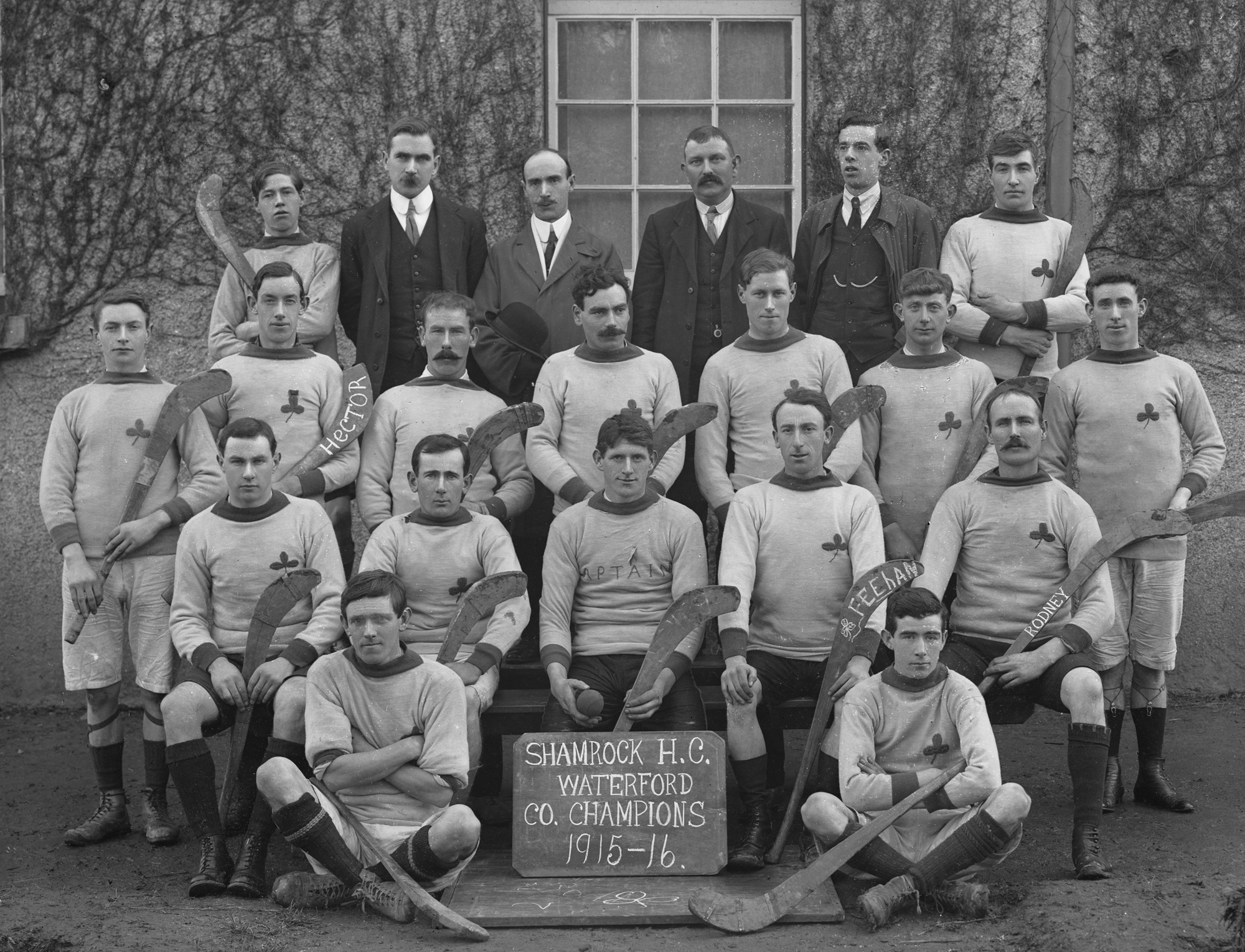
Shamrock Hurling Club team, Waterford Co. Champions, 1915–16.

The 20th century saw greater organisation in Hurling and Gaelic football. The all-Ireland Hurling championship came into existence along with the provincial championships. Cork, Kilkenny and Tipperary dominated hurling in the 20th century with each of these countries winning more than 20 All-Ireland titles each. Wexford, Waterford, Clare, Limerick, Offaly, Dublin, and Galway were also strong hurling counties during the 20th century.

- Micheál Murphy (of the Blackrock club) is the first hurler to wear a helmet - wearing it to protect a skull injury in a 1969 Fitzgibbon Cup for UCC.

== 21st century ==
As hurling entered the new millennium, it remains one of Ireland's most popular sports. An extended qualifier system and round robin format has resulted in a longer All-Ireland Senior Hurling Championship. Kilkenny have so far been the most successful team of the century, winning 11 All-Irelands. A newly resurgent Limerick has the second most, with six. The inauguration of the Christy Ring Cup and Nicky Rackard Cup gave new championships and an opportunity to play in Croke Park to the traditionally weaker county teams.
