= Crotty =

Crotty (and variations O'Crotty, Crotti, Crottee, etc.) are anglicisations of the Irish name Ó Crotaigh – 'Descendant of Crotach'. The name dates from medieval times, to the pre-Norman kingdom of Thomond ('North Munster') where the Dál gCais (in English: 'Dalcassian') clan, centred on the regional rulers – the Uí Briain (O'Brien) family – were dominant. The Crottys were one of eight septs of the O'Briens (i.e. descended via the female line – hence the different surnames). They settled in western County Waterford and eastern County Cork.

Spelling variations include Crotty, O'Crotty, Crotti, Crothon, Crotton, Crotone, Crottee, Crottey, O'Crottey, O'Crottee, O'Crottie, Croddy, and Cratty. Other non-anglicised versions in use include Crothaigh, Chrothaigh etc. The other seven related septs of the O'Briens are the families: Bernard, Consadine, Lysaght, MacMahon, O'Mahoney, Padden/MacFadden and Plunkett.

== Notable people with the Crotty surname ==
- Amber Kanazbah Crotty (born c.1978), American Navajo politician
- Bartholomew Crotty (1769–1846), Irish Catholic priest
- Cameron Crotty (born 1999), Canadian ice hockey player
- Derbhle Crotty (born 1968), Irish actress
- Dominic Crotty (born 1974), Irish rugby union footballer
- E. William Crotty (Edmund William Crotty) (1931–1999), American diplomat
- Elizabeth Crotty (1885–1960), Irish traditional musician
- Frank Crotty (1938–2016), New Zealand chemist and rower
- Horace Crotty (1886–1952), Australian Anglican bishop
- James Crotty (economist) (born 1940), American economist
- James Crotty (prospector) (1845–1898), Tasmanian prospector
- Jim Crotty (1938–2021), American football player
- Joe Crotty (1860–1926), American baseball player
- John Crotty (born 1969), American basketball player
- Kenneth Crotty (born 1938), Australian diver
- Kieran Crotty (1930–2022), Irish politician
- Maggie Crotty (1948–2020), American politician from Illinois
- Michael Crotty (born 1941), Royal Air Force officer
- Michael Francis Crotty (born 1970), Irish Roman Catholic prelate
- Mick Crotty (1946–2024), Irish hurling player
- Ned Crotty (born 1986), American lacrosse player
- Patrick Crotty (1902–1970), Irish politician
- Paul A. Crotty (born 1941), United States federal judge
- Peter Crotty (1925–2003), Irish boxer
- Raymond Crotty (1925–1994), Irish academic
- Rich Crotty (born 1948), Florida politician
- Ron Crotty (1929–2015)), American jazz bassist
- Russell Crotty (born 1956), American artist
- Ryan Crotty (born 1988), New Zealand rugby union footballer
- Shane Crotty (born 1974), American immunologist and virologist
- Thomas Crotty (1912–1942), American Coast Guardsman and prisoner of war
- William Crotty ("Crotty the Robber") was a highwayman who was hanged in Waterford in 1742. Several of his hideouts in the Comeragh Mountains are named after him.

== See also ==
- Crotty, Tasmania, Australia
  - Crotty Dam, Tasmania, Australia
- Seneca, Illinois, United States, known as Crotty prior to 1957
- Crotty Schism, early 19th-century minor Irish church schism
- Van Dyne Crotty Inc, textile leasing company in the United States
