= Culture shock =

Experience of a person moving to a different cultural environment

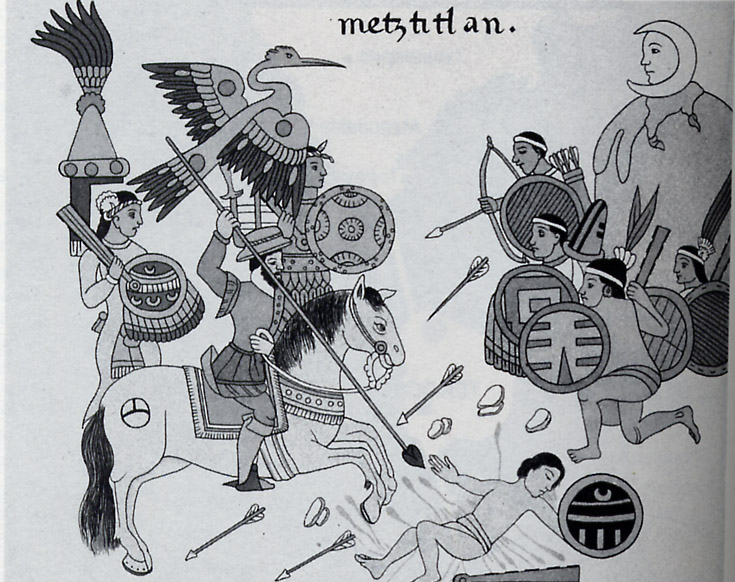
The encounter with the conquistadors with their steel artifacts and horses so shocked the Aztecs that they took the Spaniards to be prophets from the east.

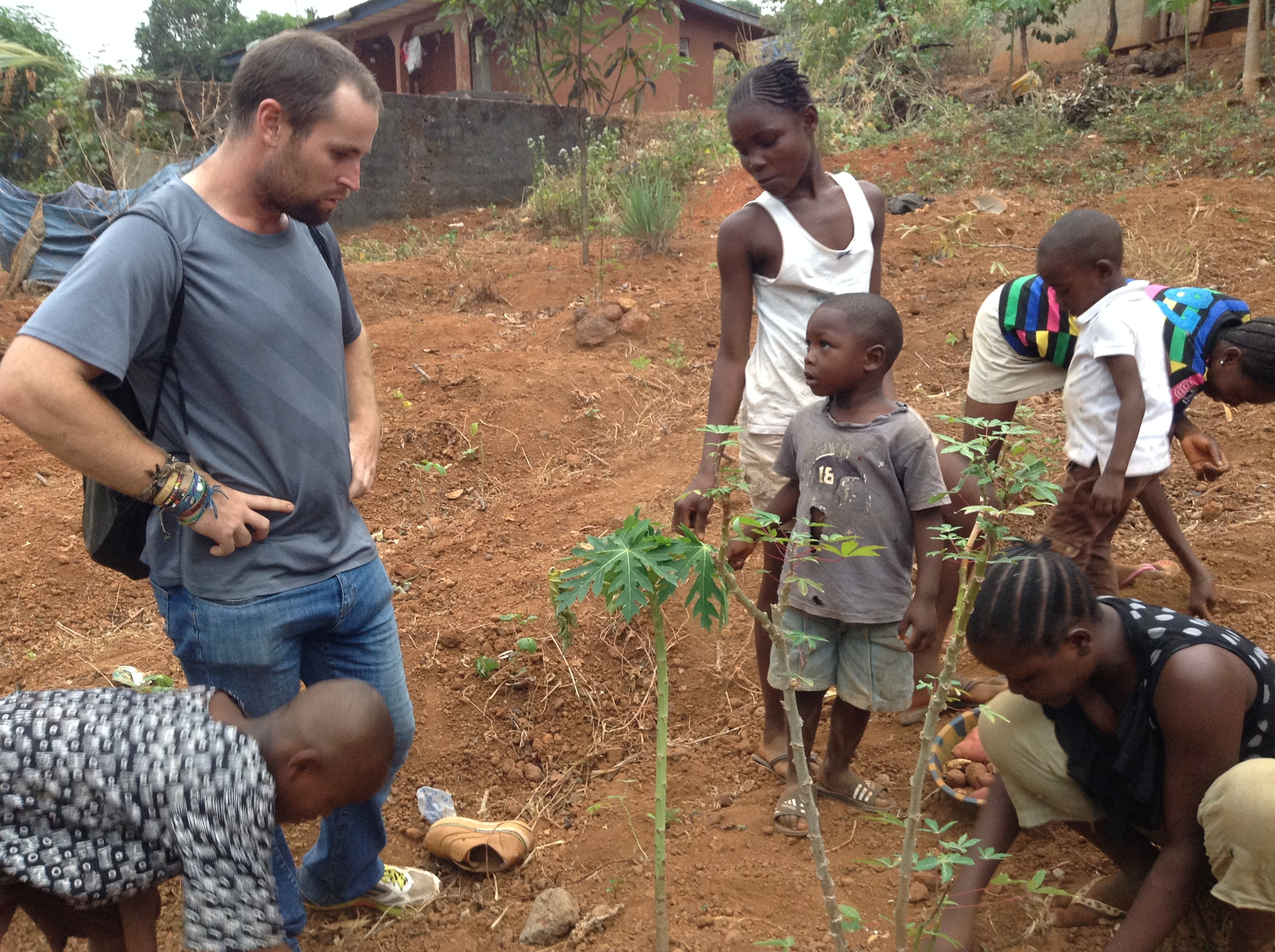
Traveler from Australia visiting a small farm in Sierra Leone

Culture shock is an experience a person may have when moving to a cultural environment which is different from one's own; it is also the personal disorientation a person may feel when experiencing an unfamiliar way of life due to immigration or a visit to a new country, a move between social environments, or simply transition to another type of life. One of the most common causes of culture shock involves individuals in a foreign environment. Culture shock can be described as consisting of at least one of four distinct phases: honeymoon, negotiation, adjustment, and adaptation.

Common problems include: information overload, language barrier, generation gap, technology gap, skill interdependence, formulation dependency, homesickness (cultural), boredom (job dependency), ethnicity, race, skin color, and response ability (cultural skill set). There is no true way to entirely prevent culture shock, as individuals in any society are personally affected by cultural contrasts differently.

Culture shock is often experienced by students who participate in study abroad programs. Research considering the study abroad experiences states that in-country support for students may assist them in overcoming the challenges and phases of culture shock. As stated in a study by Young et al., "...the distress experienced by culture shock has long-lasting effects therefore, universities with well-rounded programs that support students throughout the study abroad program, including preparation and post-program assistance, can alleviate challenges posed by culture shock, allow for global development and assist with the transition back into the home culture."

== Oberg's four phases model ==
According to acculturation model, people will initially have (1) a honeymoon period, followed by (2) a transition period, that is, cultural shock. Over time people will begin to (3) adapt (the dotted line depicted some people hated by new cultures instead), before in some cases (4) returning to their own places and re-adapting to the old culture.

Kalervo Oberg first proposed his model of cultural adjustment in a talk to the Women's Club of Rio de Janeiro in 1954.

=== Honeymoon ===
During this period, the differences between the old and new culture are seen in a romantic light. For example, in moving to a new country, an individual might love the new food, the pace of life, and the locals' habits. During the first few weeks, most people are fascinated by the new culture. They associate with nationals who speak their language, and who are polite to the foreigners. As with most honeymoon periods, this stage eventually ends.

=== Negotiation ===
After some time (usually around three months, depending on the individual), differences between the old and new culture become apparent and may create anxiety. Excitement may eventually give way to unpleasant feelings of frustration and anger as one continues to experience unfavorable events that may be perceived as strange and offensive to one's cultural attitude. Language barriers, stark differences in public hygiene, traffic safety, food accessibility and quality may heighten the sense of disconnection from the surroundings.

While being transferred into a different environment puts special pressure on communication skills, there are practical difficulties to overcome, such as circadian rhythm disruption that often leads to insomnia and daylight drowsiness; adaptation of gut flora to different bacteria levels and concentrations in food and water; and difficulty in accessing medical treatment. (The local medicines themselves may have different brand names from one's native country, and even the same active ingredients might have different nomenclature.)

Still, the most important change in the period is communication: People adjusting to a new culture often feel lonely and homesick because they are not yet used to the new environment and meet people with whom they are not familiar every day. The language barrier may become a major obstacle in creating new relationships: special attention must be paid to one's and others' culture-specific body language signs, linguistic faux pas, conversation tone, linguistic nuances and customs, and false friends. Such cultural adjustments may also cause a sense of identity confusion as individuals try to balance their original cultural identity with the pressures of assimilating into a new one. Having to preserve one's identity while adhering to new standards may be psychologically taxing, which can result in emotional tiredness or even despair.

In the case of students studying abroad, some develop additional symptoms of loneliness that ultimately affect their lifestyles as a whole. Due to the strain of living in a different country without parental support, international students often feel anxious and feel more pressure while adjusting to new cultures—even more so when the cultural distances are wide, as patterns of logic and speech are different and a special emphasis is put on rhetoric.

=== Adjustment ===
Again, after some time (usually 6 to 12 months), one grows accustomed to the new culture and develops routines. One knows what to expect in most situations and the host country no longer feels all that new. One becomes concerned with basic living again, and things become normal to one which is to say the new normal. One starts to develop problem-solving skills for dealing with the culture and begins to accept the culture's ways with a positive attitude. The alien culture begins, on a more profound level, to make sense, and negative reactions and responses to the culture are reduced.

=== Adaptation ===
In the mastery stage individuals are able to participate fully and comfortably in the host culture. Mastery does not mean total conversion; people often keep many traits from their earlier culture, such as accents and languages. This is often referred to as the bicultural stage.

== Development ==
Gary R. Weaver wrote that culture shock has "three basic causal explanations": loss of familiar cues, the breakdown of interpersonal communications, and an identity crisis. Peter S. Adler emphasized the psychological causes. Tema Milstein wrote that it can have positive effects.

== Reverse culture shock ==
Reverse culture shock (also known as "re-entry shock" or "own culture shock") may take place – returning to one's home culture after growing accustomed to a new one can produce the same effects as described above. These are results from the psychosomatic and psychological consequences of the readjustment process to the primary culture. The affected person often finds this more surprising and difficult to deal with than the original culture shock. This phenomenon, the reactions that members of the re-entered culture exhibit toward the re-entrant, and the inevitability of the two are encapsulated in the following saying (the title of a book by Thomas Wolfe): You Can't Go Home Again.

Reverse culture shock is generally made up of two parts: idealization and expectations. When an extended period of time is spent abroad, humans have a tendency to focus on the good from their past over the bad and create an idealization. Secondly, once removed from our familiar setting and placed in a foreign one, humans are biased towards incorrectly assuming that their previous world has not changed. The realization that life back home is now different, that the world has continued on, and the process of readjusting to these new conditions as well as actualizing new perceptions about the world with an old way of living causes discomfort and psychological anguish.

== Outcomes ==
There are three basic outcomes of the adjustment phase:

- Some people find it impossible to accept the foreign culture and to integrate. They isolate themselves from the host country's environment, which they come to perceive as hostile, withdraw into an (often mental) "ghetto" and see return to their own culture as the only way out.
- Some people integrate fully and take on all parts of the host culture while losing their original identity. This is called cultural assimilation. They normally remain in the host country forever.
- Some people manage to adapt to the aspects of the host culture they see as positive, while keeping some of their own and creating their unique blend. They have no major problems returning home or relocating elsewhere. This group can be thought to be cosmopolitan.

Culture shock has many different effects, time spans, and degrees of severity. Many people are hampered by its presence and do not recognize why they are bothered.

There is evidence to suggest that the psychological influence of culture shock might also have physiological implications. For example, the psycho-social stress experienced during these circumstances is correlated with an early onset of puberty.

== Transition shock ==
Culture shock is a subcategory of a more universal construct called transition shock. Transition shock is a state of loss and disorientation predicated by a change in one's familiar environment that requires adjustment. There are many symptoms of transition shock, including:

- Anger
- Boredom
- Compulsive eating/drinking/weight gain
- Desire for home and old friends
- Excessive concern over cleanliness
- Excessive sleep or trouble falling asleep
- Feelings of helplessness and withdrawal
- Getting "stuck" on one thing
- Glazed stare
- Homesickness
- Hostility towards host nationals
- Impulsivity
- Irritability
- Mood swings
- Physiological stress reactions
- Stereotyping host nationals
- Suicidal or fatalistic thoughts
- Withdrawal

== See also ==
- China Hands
- Cultural conflict
- Cultural cringe
- Cultural intelligence
- Cultural schema theory
- Expatriate
- Fresh off the boat
- Future Shock
- Intercultural communication
- Jet lag
- Lost in Translation (film)
- Neophobia
- Outsourced (film)
- Paris syndrome
- Student exchange program
- Xenophobia
