= Ballinamult =

Hamlet in County Waterford, Ireland

Ballinamult Béal na Molt
- Village
- Location in Ireland
- Coordinates: 52°12′44″N 7°43′59″W
- Country: Ireland
- Province: Munster
- County: County Waterford
- Time zone: UTC+0 (WET)
  - Summer (DST): UTC-1 (IST (WEST))

Ballinamult, or Ballynamult (Irish: Béal na Molt, meaning ' the Gap of Weathers'), is a hamlet in County Waterford, Ireland. It is in the historic Sliabh gCua district between the Comeragh and Knockmealdown Mountains.

The hamlet is near the border with County Tipperary. Towns in the area include Clonmel (17 km to the north) and Dungarvan (15 km to the south).

== Ballinamult Barracks ==
The barracks was built by 1714 as it features on a map of that date by Herman Moll and it is described as a redoubt for twenty men. It was situated on a bluff on the East bank of the Finisk River guarding access to County Tipperary. In 1918, the garrison consisted of a Sergeant and three constables. Later on this was increased by a party of about a dozen soldiers.

== See also ==
- Sliabh gCua
- Touraneena
