= Seefin =

Seefin is the anglicisation of the Irish Suí Finn, meaning Finn's Seat (Finn refers to Fionn mac Cumhaill), and may refer to the following places in Ireland:

- Seefin, a townland in County Cavan
- Seefin (Comeragh Mountains) (726 m), a mountain in the Comeragh Mountains, County Waterford
- Seefin (Wicklow Mountains) (621 m), a mountain near Blessington in the Wicklow Mountains
- Seefin Passage Tomb on top of Seefin Mountain in County Wicklow
- Seefin (Ballyhoura Mountains) (528 m), a hill in County Limerick
- Seefin Mountain (493 m), a hill in the Glenbeigh Horseshoe area of County Kerry
- Seefin (Boggeragh Mountains) (491 m), a hill in the Boggeragh Mountains in County Cork
- Seefin (Sheep's Head) (345 m), a hill on the Sheep's Head Peninsula, near Kilcrohane in County Cork
