= Sliabh gCua–St Mary's GAA =

Gaelic games club in County Waterford, Ireland

Sliabh gCua–St Mary's GAA Club
- Sliabh gCua–Naomh Mhuire C.L.G.
- Founded: 1970
- County: Waterford
- Colours: Yellow and Maroon (Hurling) Green and White (Football)
- Grounds: Kirwan Park

Playing kits
Standard colours

Senior Club Championships
	All Ireland	Munster champions	Waterford champions
Football:	0	0	0
Hurling:	0	0	0

Sliabh gCua–St Mary's GAA is a GAA club based between Dungarvan and Clonmel, County Waterford, Ireland. The club plays both hurling and Gaelic football. The club can trace its way back to 1927 but it was in 1970 that the present club Sliabh gCua–St Mary's GAA was formed. The club still uses two separate names depending on which sport they are playing. The name St Mary's is used as the name for its hurling teams, while its football teams still go under the name of Sliabh gCua. At underage, they are joined with Modeligo and are known as Naomh Brid. At U21 level, they are joined with a few other small local clubs Colligan and Kilgobinet, who play under the name Comeragh Gaels.

== History ==
Late in 1969, a letter was forwarded to the then curate of the parish of Touraneena and The Nire, Fr Brendan Crowley. In the letter from Gerry Cullinan as well as brother Tom and Ned Power who were all based in Dublin at the time, attention was drawn to the fact that there was a growing interest in forming a football club in Touraneena and he was asked to announce at mass that coming Sunday that a meeting would take place the following Tuesday with a view of forming a club.

Having a G.A.A. club in the Touraneena area was nothing new. Down the years, a number of different clubs were formed in the area but most were short lived and went out of existence as quickly as they were formed. In 1936, a former Sliabh gCua Club won the Junior Football County final, beating Fenor in the final after a replay. Twelve months previously, Sliabh gCua were beaten in the county final by the now defunct St Stephen's Club. In times when there was no club in Touraneena, it did not deter local men form playing hurling and football, often lining out in the colours of another neighbouring parish. In the 1950s, a number of players travelled to the Ring Club where they were part of a side that won a minor football county final. When a club was based in the Touraneena area the opposite happened as well, as players from local parishes who did not have a club in the area they played came to Touraneena to play.

Even after the formation of the present Sliabh gCua–St Mary's Club, enough players were not available to participate in the underage competition which began to be organised from the late 1960s and as a result they travelled to play with Fourmilewater, who with a number of Touraneena players in their colours won a minor hurling county final in 1973.

The present Sliabh gCua–St Mary's G.A.A. Club first competed in the various championships from 1970 and since then has won its fair share of championships in both hurling and football. The first twenty or so years of the club's history saw plenty of silverware make its way to the area between the Knockmealdown and Comeragh Mountains. The first title came in 1972 when the western Junior Football Championship was annexed, but the locals had to give second best to Tramore in the County Final.

The period between 1978 and 1983 proved to be a successful period for the club. St Mary's beat Ardmore in the 1978 Western Junior Hurling Final and went on to beat Rathgormack in the County decider. In Junior football Sliabh gCua reached the western final but were beaten by Ballinameela.

1979 proved to be an even better year. In Junior Football Sliabh gCua managed to capture the Junior Football championship in the west but had to give second best to Fenor by a small margin in the county final. In Intermediate Hurling St Mary's beat neighbours Fourmilewater in the Intermediate Western final winning by four points but in the county final went under to the same opposition by seven points.

1980 again saw Sliabh gCua win the Western Junior Football Final where for the second year in a row beat Stradbally in the final but went under to Roanmore in the county final. In Intermediate hurling Saint Mary's beat Dungarvan 2–16 to 3–10 in the county final.

Twelve months on, Sliabh gCua were again in the Junior Football Western Final and for the third year in a row beat Stradbally in the decider and made it third time lucky in a delayed County Final (Played in 1982) beat Tramore 1–10 to 0–4. In 1983, St Mary's reached the Western Intermediate Hurling Final where they beat Tallow in the final at Cappoquin and went on to beat Ballygunner 2–7 to 1–9 in the County Final at Walsh Park.

During that time 1982 proved to be a successful year in the club's history as it played both Senior Hurling and Senior Football.

After the 1983 win against Ballygunner the Sliabh gCua/St Mary's had a number of lean years, not reaching any divisional or county finals until 1986 when they were beaten in the Intermediate Football Western Final against The Brickeys. Twelve months on it was the same story in the same competition when they went under to Shamrock's in the Western Final. 1988 however proved to a bit better when they won the Western Final in Intermediate Football was captured but lost to Gaultier in the County Final.

1989 proved to be the club's best ever year. Sliabh gCua beat Affane to win the Western Intermediate Football Championship for the second year running and went on to beat Portlaw in the County Final. In Junior Hurling, St Mary's beat Ballinameela to win the Junior Hurling Western Final and then beat Ballydurn in the County Final. These wins helped secure the title Club of the Year in the county for the Sliabh gCua–St Mary's Club at the end of 1989.

In 1990, Sliabh gCua were relegated from the Senior Football ranks after just one year, but did retain their status in the Intermediate Hurling ranks. However, not all was lost, as Sliabh gCua assisted by Modeligo won the County Under 21 'B' Football Final beating Erin's Own at Kill.

1991 saw Sliabh gCua beat Newtown to go back up to senior level.

Since 1991, the Sliabh gCua–St Mary's Club had little to cheer about. In Football, the club retained its senior status for a number of years in the mid-1990s but were eventually relegated to the intermediate ranks once again. In Hurling St Mary's had a number of good years in the mid-1990s in the Intermediate hurling ranks, but lost the chance of contesting the latter stages of the championship on a number of years.

The club retained its place in both the intermediate hurling and football championships until 2007 when St Mary's were relegated from the hurling championship. In 2008 the Western Junior Hurling Final was reached but St Mary's lost to Modeligo. In 2009, Sliabh gCua were relegated from the Intermediate football Championship. Two years later, Sliabh gCua beat An Sean Phobal to lift the Western Junior Football Championship.

== Honours ==
- Waterford Senior Hurling Championships: 0
- Waterford Senior Football Championships: 0
- Waterford Intermediate Hurling Championships: (2)
  - 1980 & 1983
- Waterford Intermediate Football Championships: (2)
  - 1989 & 1991
- Waterford Junior Hurling Championships: (2)
  - 1978 & 1989
- West Waterford Junior Hurling Championships: (4)
  - 1979, 1989, 2015, 2016,
- West Waterford Junior Football Championships: (6)
  - 1936, 1972, 1979, 1980, 1981, 2011, 2017
- Waterford Junior Football Championships: (4)
  - 1936, 1981, 2011, 2017
- Waterford Under-21 Football Championships: 1
  - 1990 (B)
- Waterford GAA Club of the Years: (1)
  - 1989
- Waterford GAA Special Achievement Awards: (1)
  - 2011

== See also ==
- Sliabh gCua
- Ballinamult
- Touraneena
