= Denis Coffey (hurler) =

Irish hurler

Personal information
- Native name: Donncha Ó Cofaigh (Irish)
- Born: 1983 (age 42–43) Sliabh gCua, County Waterford, Ireland
- Height: 5 ft 8 in (173 cm)

Sport
- Sport: Hurling
- Position: Right corner-back
Club
- Years: Club
- Sliabh gCua–St Mary's
Club titles
| | Football | Hurling |
| Waterford titles | 0 | 0 |
Inter-county*
| Years | County | Apps (scores) |
| 2001-present | Waterford | 6 (0-1) |
Inter-county titles
- Munster titles: 0
- All-Irelands: 0
- NHL: 0
- All Stars: 0
- *Inter County team apps and scores correct as of 19:10, 3 November 2012.

Denis Coffey (born 1983) is an Irish hurler who played as a right corner-back for the Waterford senior team.

Coffey joined the team during the 2004 National League and was a semi-regular member of the team until after the 2008. During that time he won Munster medals and one National League medal as a non-playing substitute.

At club level Coffey is a dual player with the Sliabh gCua–St Mary's club.

== Playing career ==
=== Club ===
Coffey plays his club hurling with the St Mary's club while he also plays Gaelic football with the Sliabh gCua club.

In 2011 he won a junior football championship medal with Sliabh gCua.

=== Inter-county ===
Coffey first came to prominence on the inter-county scene as a member of the Waterford minor hurling team in 2001. He enjoyed little success in this grade.

Coffey made his senior debut for Waterford in a National League game against Laois in 2004. He played a number of games during that campaign; however, he played no part in Waterford's successful Munster campaign later that season.

In 2007 he won a National League medal as a non-playing substitute when Waterford defeated Kilkenny by 0–20 to 0–18 in the final.

The following year Coffey was an unused substitute as Waterford faced a heavy 3–30 to 1–13 defeat by Kilkenny in the All-Ireland final.
