= Fauscoum =

Mountain in County Waterford, Ireland

- Kilclooney Mountain
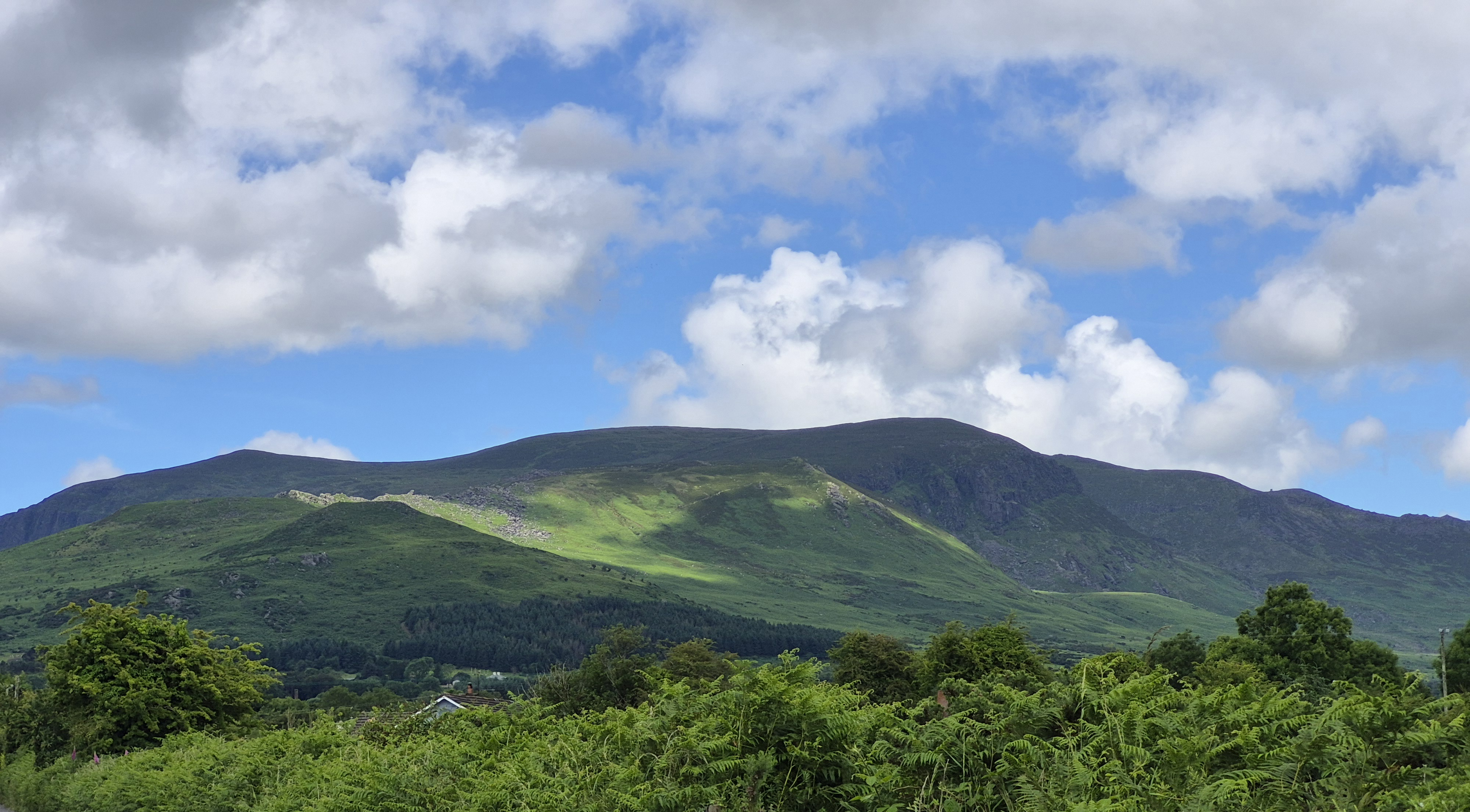
- Fauscoum, the highest peak in the Comeragh Mountains

Highest point
- Elevation: 792 m (2,598 ft)
- Prominence: 628 m (2,060 ft)
- Parent peak: Knockmealdown
- Listing: P600, Marilyn, Hewitt
- Coordinates: 52°14′32″N 7°32′17″W

Naming
- Native name: Fáschom

Geography
- Location within island of Ireland
- Location: County Waterford, Ireland
- Parent range: Comeragh Mountains
- OSI/OSNI grid: S317105
- Topo map: OSi Discovery 75

Fauscoum (Irish: Fáschom), also known as Kilclooney Mountain, is a mountain in County Waterford, Ireland. With a height of 792 m (2,598 ft), it is the highest mountain of the Comeragh Mountain Range and the second highest mountain in County Waterford after Knockmealdown.

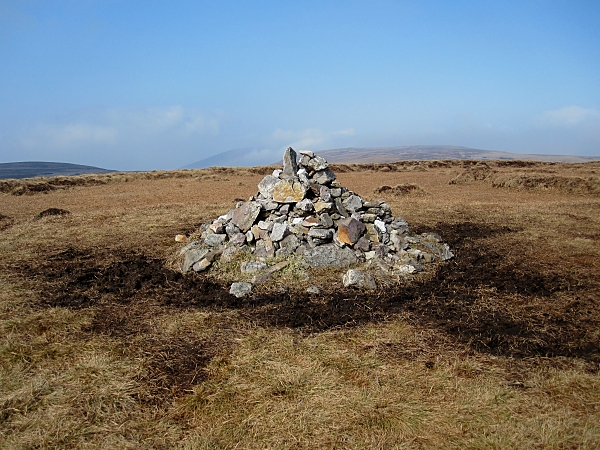
Summit cairn on Fauscoum

== See also ==
- Lists of mountains in Ireland
- List of mountains of the British Isles by height
- List of P600 mountains in the British Isles
- List of Marilyns in the British Isles
- List of Hewitt mountains in England, Wales and Ireland
