= Denis Coffey =

Denis Coffey may refer to:

- Denis Coffey (hurler)
- Denis Coffey (physician)

== See also ==
- Dennis Coffey, American guitarist
