= USS Quail (AM-15) =

Minesweeper of the United States Navy

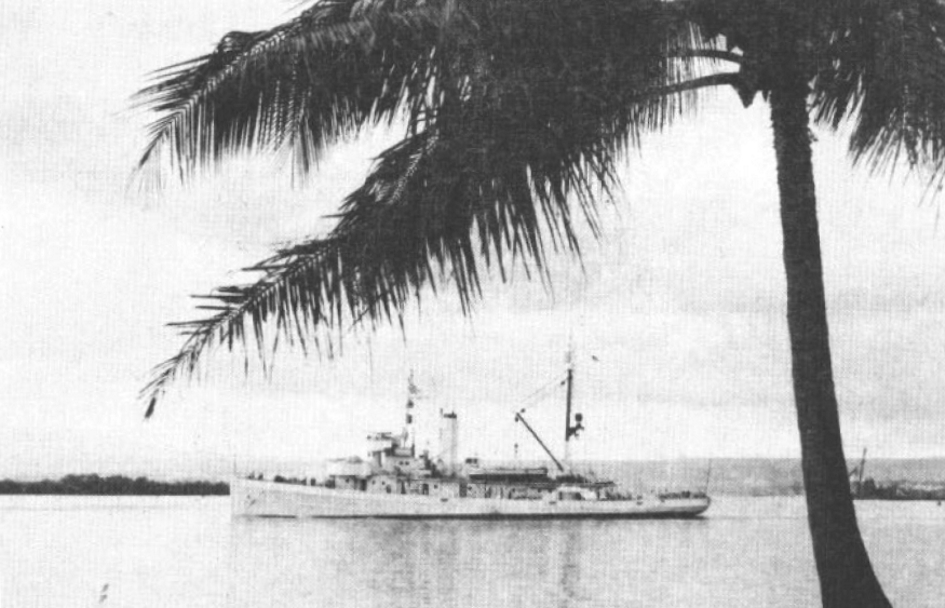

History

United States
- Name: USS Quail
- Builder: Chester Shipbuilding Co., Chester, Pennsylvania
- Laid down: 14 May 1918
- Launched: 6 October 1918
- Commissioned: 29 April 1919, as Minesweeper No.15
- Reclassified: AM-15, 17 July 1920
- Stricken: 8 May 1942
- Honours and awards: 1 battle star (World War II)
- Fate: Scuttled to prevent capture, 5 May 1942

General characteristics
- Class & type: Lapwing-class minesweeper
- Displacement: 840 long tons (853 t)
- Length: 187 ft 10 in (57.25 m)
- Beam: 35 ft 6 in (10.82 m)
- Draft: 8 ft 10 in (2.69 m)
- Speed: 14 knots (26 km/h; 16 mph)
- Complement: 61
- Armament: 2 × 3 in (76 mm) guns

USS Quail (AM-15) was a U.S. Navy Lapwing-class minesweeper, named after the quail, a migratory game bird. It was laid down 14 May 1918 by the Chester Shipbuilding Co., Chester, Pennsylvania; launched 6 October 1918; and commissioned 29 April 1919.

== Post-World War I operations ==
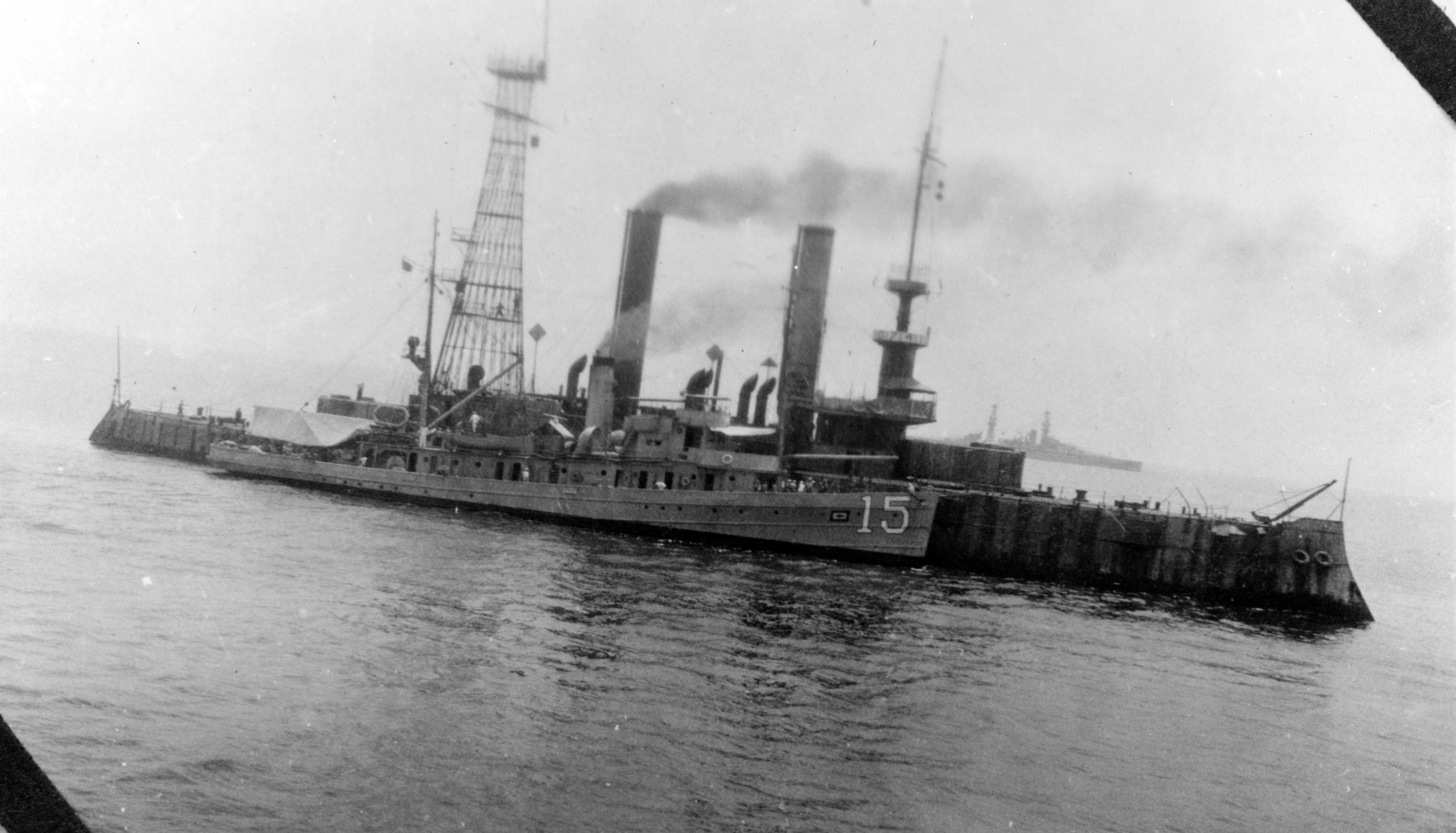
Quail alongside Coast Battleship No. 4 (ex. USS Iowa (BB-4)) off Panama, early 1923. A Pennsylvania-class battleship is in the background.

Quail steamed to Kirkwall, Scotland, to join the North Sea Mine Sweeping Detachment. She operated with this force clearing the North Sea of mines until 25 November 1919. She operated with the Atlantic Fleet in Cuban waters during early 1920, and then along the U.S. East Coast. In September 1922 she was attached to the submarine base at Coco Solo, Panama Canal Zone, operating in the Caribbean.

Quail made a cruise to the east coast in late 1923, and in 1925 she was at Philadelphia, Pennsylvania, for repairs. In 1927 she spent time patrolling the west coast of Nicaragua, and later joined the fleet in the Caribbean for maneuvers. From July 1928 to January 1929, she was on the east coast, operating between Virginia and Massachusetts. She returned to Coco Solo in 1929. Following duty with the control force in the Panama Canal area from 1929 to 1931, Quail operated out of Pearl Harbor, Hawaii, from 1931 to 1941, including in her duties a period of survey work off Alaska. On 25 July 1940 the Quail landed a force to construct a naval air station on Palmyra Atoll.

In 1932, the USS Quail visited the French Frigate shoals, anchoring near East Island of the French Frigate Shoals. Using a seaplane tendered from the ship, some of the first aerial photographs of the islands were taken.

== World War II Pacific operations ==
At the outbreak of war with Japan, the USS Quail was in the Philippines. During the defense of Corregidor in the Battle of Corregidor (1942), Lieutenant Thomas James Eugene “Jimmy” Crotty, Coast Guard Academy Class of 1934, served as the executive officer of the Quail. She shot down enemy aircraft and swept mine fields to keep open a channel providing access to the South Harbor at Corregidor. This enabled U.S. submarines to safely pass and surface at night, delivering goods and removing critical personnel from Corregidor.

The Quail helped defend Bataan during the Battle of the Points. After the Quail was gutted of arms as Bataan surrendered, her crew then went over to Corregidor to aid in the defense of the island, becoming part of the Marines 4th Regiment as infantry on Corregidor. Crotty then commanded a force of Marines and Army personnel manning 75mm beach guns on the overnight of 5/6 May, firing down on enemy forces landing on Corregidor's beaches.

Damaged by enemy bombs and guns, Quail was scuttled on 5 May 1942 by U.S. forces to prevent her capture. Part of her crew, Lt Cmdr. John H. Morrill and 17 others, escaped to Darwin, Australia, in a 36-foot motor launch. The rest of the crew became prisoners of war of Imperial Japan. A number were sent to Japan to become slave laborers for Japanese companies. Chief Petty Officer Virgil Byrd, sick with wet beriberi and the beginnings of congestive heart failure, was beaten to death on 11 May 1943 at the POW Camp #3D Yodogawa in Osaka, Japan, for selling an extra pair of shoes to a Japanese workman. Byrd was beaten unconscious, revived, and beaten again three times, and died that evening. The POW Camp supplied Allied POW slave labor to Yodogawa Steel Works, Ltd.

With Corregidor's capitulation on 6 May 1942, Crotty became the first Coast Guard prisoner of war since the War of 1812, when the British had captured U.S. Revenue Cutter Service cuttermen. At the end of May, the Japanese loaded Crotty and his fellow prisoners into watercraft transferring POWs from Corregidor Island to Manila, where they were marched through the city to Bilibid Prison on the "Walk of Shame" and eventually taken by railroad in boxcars to the Cabanatuan POW camp in northern Luzon. He died of diphtheria July 19, 1942 in the Cabanatuan POW Camp.

== Awards ==
Quail received one battle star for World War II service.
