= Cross-cultural capital =

Facet of human capital

In management and organizational studies disciplines, cross-cultural capital (CCC) is the aggregate set of knowledge, skills, abilities and psychological dispositions that gives individuals competitive advantage in interacting, working, and managing in culturally diverse environments. It is considered a facet of human capital.

Cross-cultural capital is conceived as a broad construct and it is composed of both dispositional (or, more trait-like) and experience-based elements (more statelike), including personality dispositions (e.g., openness to experience), values and beliefs (e.g., pro-diversity beliefs), cognitive style (cognitive flexibility) and acquired specific skills (e.g., mastery of several languages) as well as of relevant experiences (e.g., traveling, living and working in different countries; growing up in a multicultural environment). Some scholars include cultural intelligence (CQ) as one of the state-like components of cross-cultural capital. This corresponds to Ang and Van Dyne's nomological network of cultural intelligence model, where cultural intelligence is conceptualized as a more of state-like construct that mediates distal factors, which are typified as trait-like (e.g., personality traits) and intermediate constructs such as communication apprehension and anxiety, which, in turn, are postulated to affect a host of individual and interpersonal outcomes that can be broadly classified into performance and cultural adaptation.
