= Knockanaffrin =

Mountain in County Waterford, Ireland

- Cnoc an Aifrinn
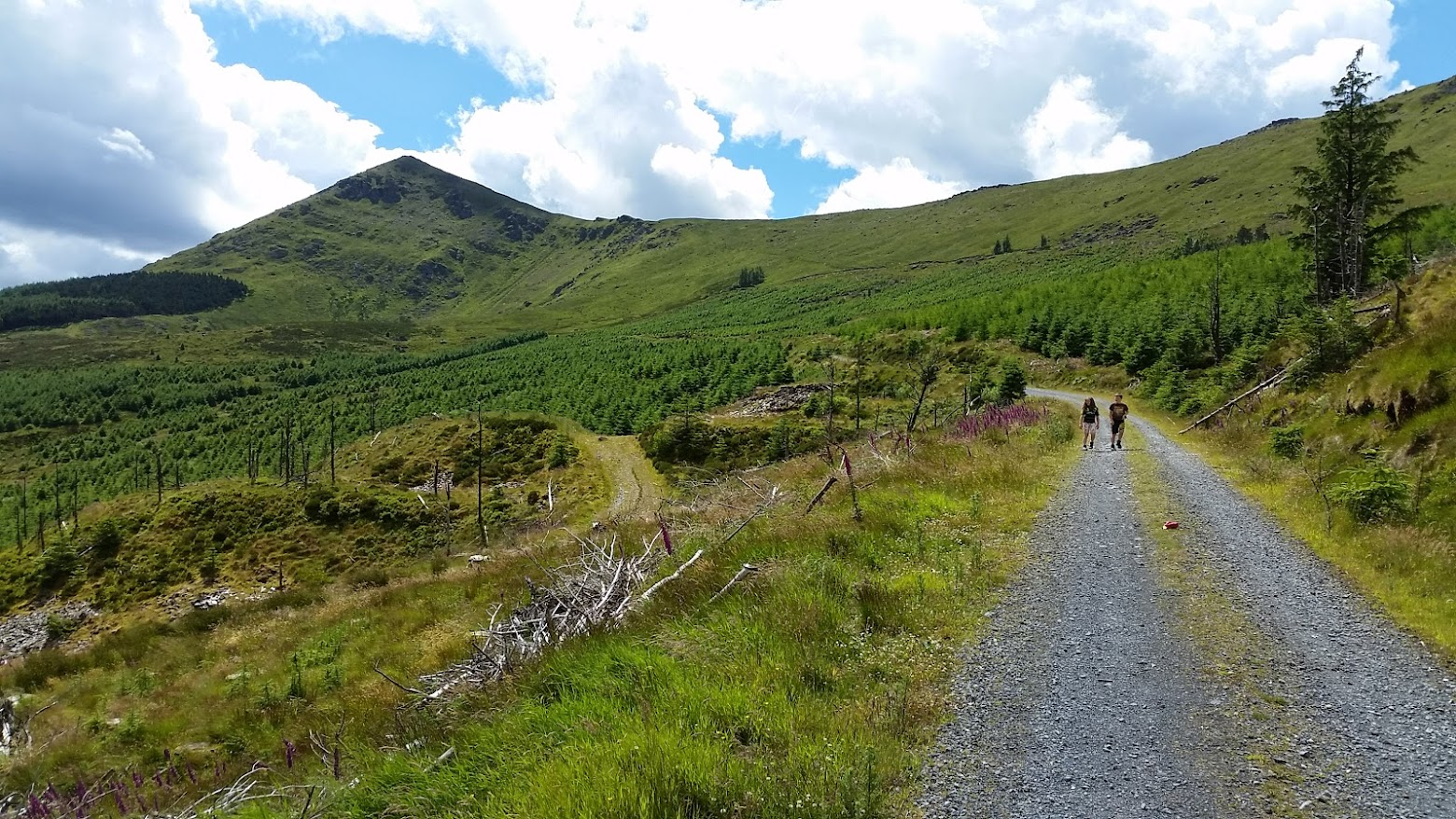

Highest point
- Elevation: 755 m (2,477 ft)
- Prominence: 289 m (948 ft)
- Listing: Hewitt, Marilyn
- Coordinates: 52°17′21″N 7°34′56″W

Naming
- English translation: Hill of the Mass
- Language of name: Irish

Geography
- Location within island of Ireland
- Location: County Waterford, Ireland
- Parent range: Comeragh Mountains

Knockanaffrin (from Irish Cnoc an Aifrinn, meaning 'hill of the mass') is a mountain in County Waterford, Ireland. It is part of the Comeragh Mountains.

== See also ==
- Lists of mountains in Ireland
- List of mountains of the British Isles by height
- List of Marilyns in the British Isles
- List of Hewitt mountains in England, Wales and Ireland
