= Kirwan Park =

Kirwan Park is the GAA grounds for the Sliabh gCua-Saint Marys GAA club, located in Co. Waterford. In 1981, it was decided at the AGM to buy the clubs own field and build dressing rooms. Later that year, Eddie Kirwan, a local farmer, offered the club a field. The 9 acres (36,000 m^{2}) was bought for £6,000, under two conditions; it was to be known as "Kirwan Park" and it was to be used solely for GAA purposes. A house to house collection was arranged, and £5,400 was collected.

Before the development of Kirwan Park, training was done in various fields around the parish. There was no stability so the new training grounds were very welcomed by all members. The refurbishment of the dressing rooms was officially opened by Mr. Nicky Brennan, GAA President, on 12 January 2008.
