= Tooraneena =

Village in County Waterford, Ireland

Tooraneena Tuar an Fhíona
- Village
- Location in Ireland
- Coordinates: 52°12′08″N 7°42′56″W
- Country: Ireland
- Province: Munster
- County: Waterford
- Time zone: UTC+0 (WET)
  - Summer (DST): UTC-1 (IST (WEST))

Tooraneena or Touraneena (Irish: Tuar an Fhíona, meaning ' apparently "Green of the Wine" ') is a village in west County Waterford, Ireland. It lies in the Sliabh gCua district between the Comeraghs and Knockmealdown Mountains. It may be accessed from the main R672 road between Clonmel and Dungarvan. It is about 20 km (12 mi) from Dungarvan and 19 km (12 mi) from Clonmel.

== Geography and demographics ==
The townland of Tooraneena covers an area of 2.3 km^{2} (0.9 miles^{2}) and the village is located in its south-west corner. It is surrounded by the townlands of (clockwise from north) Boolavonteen, Reanadampaun Commons, Knockroy, Clooncogaile, and Cahernaleague. Tooraneena is one of thirteen townlands that make up the electoral division of Seskinan.

The village and its surrounding area is sparsely populated, with the population of the local small area (a subdivision of the electoral division) on the day of the 2016 census only 208, of whom 47 (23%) were aged under 18, and the usually-resident population was 205. Out of the 205 usual residents of the area 179 were born in Ireland and 21 in the United Kingdom, while the ethnicity of local residents was 203 white, one other ethnicity and one not stated.

The 2016 census also showed that of the 88 households in the area, 87 were living in houses, with one household not stating the type of residence in which they lived. Thirty people considered themselves to have a disability and thirteen people stated that they were carers.

== Amenities ==
The village includes St Mary's National School (primary school), a playing field, community hall, a Catholic church, two public houses, a shop and a community park. Gaelic Athletic Association (GAA) playing fields lie about one kilometre (0.62 mi) to the north.
