= Coumfea =

Mountain in County Waterford, Ireland

- Coum Fia
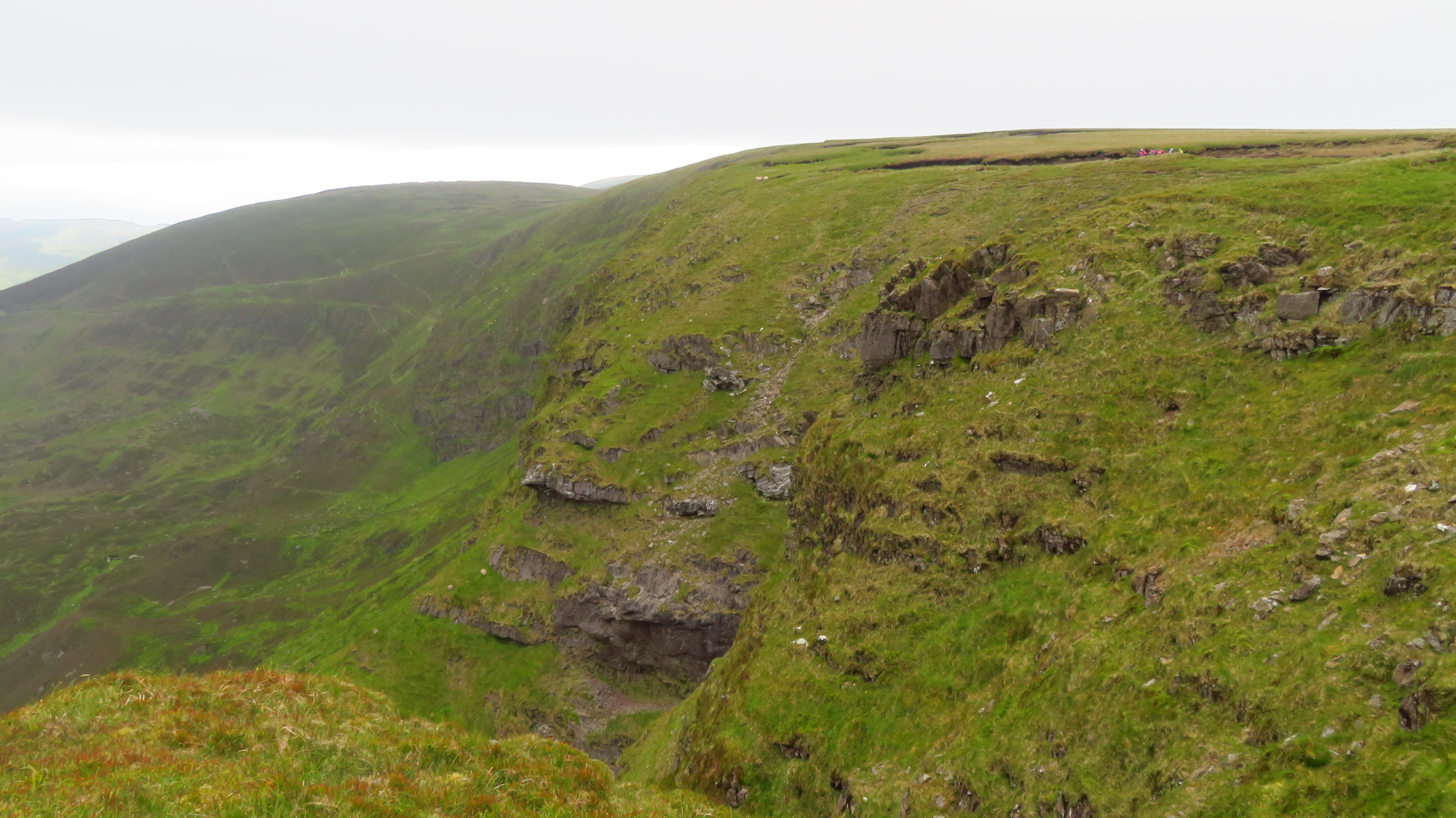

Highest point
- Elevation: 744 m (2,441 ft)
- Prominence: 70 m (230 ft)
- Listing: Hewitt, Marilyn
- Coordinates: 52°14′19″N 7°34′8″W

Naming
- English translation: Hill of the Deer
- Language of name: Irish

Geography
- Location within island of Ireland
- Location: County Waterford, Ireland
- Parent range: Comeragh Mountains

Coumfea (from Irish Coum Fia, meaning 'Coum of Deer' or 'Wild Coum') is a mountain and series of glacial valleys in County Waterford, Ireland. It is part of the Comeragh Mountains.

Coumfea and Coumalocha combine to make one bowl shape hollow facing west towards Ballymacarbary and the Nire Valley.

Coumtay facing towards the South and East backs onto Coumfea with only a narrow ridge between them.

== See also ==
- Lists of mountains in Ireland
- List of mountains of the British Isles by height
- List of Marilyns in the British Isles
- List of Hewitt mountains in England, Wales and Ireland
