= Sliabh gCua =

Traditional district of west County Waterford, Ireland

Sliabh gCua (formerly anglicized as "Slieve Gua" or "Slieve Goe") is a traditional district of west County Waterford, Ireland, between Clonmel and Dungarvan, covering areas like Touraneena, Ballinamult and Knockboy. Historically it meant the Knockmealdown Mountains and possibly also the neighboring Comeragh Mountains. It was an Irish-speaking area until the late 19th century. Many people associated with the Irish sean-nós singing tradition, such as Pádraig Ó Mileadha and Labhrás Ó Cadhla, who came from Sliabh gCua. One of the best-loved emigrant songs in the sean-nós canon, "Sliabh Geal gCua na Féile", was written by Ó Mileadha while he worked in Wales.

== Knockboy ==
Ancient ogham writings may be observed at the 12th-century Knockboy church in the heart of Sliabh gCua. Dan Fraher, after whom the Fraher Field GAA grounds in Dungarvan are named, came from the Skeheens townland of Sliabh gCua and is buried in Knockboy graveyard.

== See also ==
- Fraher Field
- Sliabh gCua-Saint Marys GAA
- Touraneena
- Ballinamult
