= Van Dyne =

Van Dyne is a Dutch surname.

Notable people and places with the name include:

- George Van Dyne (1933–1981), pioneer of systems ecology
- Janet van Dyne, a fictional superhero appearing in Marvel Comics
- Nadia van Dyne, Marvel Comics character; Janet's daughter
- Van Dyne Crotty, American uniform laundering and rental company
- Vernon Van Dyne, distinguished U.S. Army Officer

== See also ==
- Van Dyne, Wisconsin, unincorporated census-designated place in Fond du Lac County, Wisconsin
- Van Dyne Civic Building, historic courthouse building located in Bradford County, Pennsylvania
- Dyne, a unit of force
