= Seefin (Comeragh Mountains) =

Mountain in County Waterford, Ireland

- Suí Finn
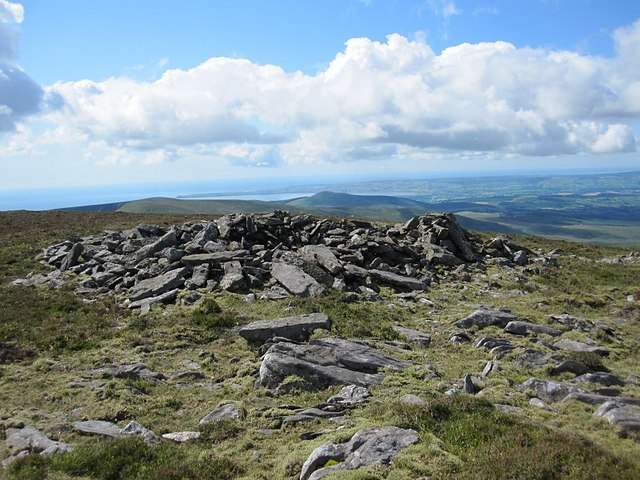

Highest point
- Elevation: 726 m (2,382 ft)
- Listing: Hewitt, Marilyn
- Coordinates: 52°12′46″N 7°35′59″W

Naming
- English translation: Finn's Seat
- Language of name: Irish

Geography
- Location within island of Ireland
- Location: County Waterford, Ireland
- Parent range: Comeragh Mountains
- OSI/OSNI grid: S274068

Seefin (from Irish Sui Finn, meaning 'the seat of Finn') is a mountain in the Comeragh Mountains in County Waterford, Ireland. Seefin is a common placename in Ireland and can refer to other areas and mountains.

Seefin is 726m high and is an Irish Hewitt with a fallen trig point.

This peak provides an excellent perspective from the south towards Crohaun and the coast, being the southern end of the Comeraghs, as well as a view northward to the major mountain range.

== See also ==
- Lists of mountains in Ireland
- List of mountains of the British Isles by height
- List of Marilyns in the British Isles
- List of Hewitt mountains in England, Wales and Ireland
