= James Crotty (prospector) =

Irish-born Australian mining prospector

James Crotty (c. 1845–1898) was an Irish-born Australian mining prospector who formed a mining company, the North Mount Lyell mining company, in the western region of Tasmania, just before the turn of the twentieth century.

His mining company was in fierce competition with Mount Lyell Mining and Railway Company that operated on the western side of Mount Lyell and he was in London seeking further investment funds for his mine when he died.

After he died, and the failure of the North Mount Lyell smelters at Crotty his company was amalgamated with the Mount Lyell Mining and Railway Company in 1903.

His estate, being left to the Roman Catholic Church, enabled the completion of St Patrick's Catherdral in Melbourne, Victoria.

His legacy currently is in the name of a now drowned townsite, Crotty, and Crotty Dam.
