= Thomas Crotty =

Thomas James Eugene Crotty
- Nickname: "Jimmy"
- Born: March 18, 1912; Buffalo, New York
- Died: July 19, 1942 (aged 30) Cabanatuan, Philippines
- Buried: Holy Cross Cemetery, Lackawanna, New York
- Allegiance: United States of America
- Branch: United States Coast Guard
- Service years: 1934–1942
- Rank: Lieutenant
- Conflicts: World War II: Philippines campaign; Battle of Bataan; Battle of Corregidor
- Awards: Bronze Star; Purple Heart; Prisoner of War Medal

Thomas James Eugene Crotty (March 18, 1912 – July 19, 1942) was a United States Coast Guard lieutenant. He was the first coast guardsman to become a prisoner of war since the War of 1812 and the only coast guardsman to be captured during World War II and since.

== Early life and career ==
Thomas Crotty was born on March 18, 1912, in Buffalo, New York. Crotty attended the United States Coast Guard Academy in New London, Connecticut, where he excelled amongst his peers. Prior to graduation in 1934, he served as the captain of the football team and the class president during his senior year.

For the next six years, Crotty served aboard various Coast Guard cutters based out of various locations all over the United States. He was first assigned to the USCGC Tampa based out of Staten Island, New York. On September 8, 1934, a fire broke out aboard the ocean liner SS Morro Castle off of Long Beach Island, New Jersey. Crotty and the rest of the crew of the USCGC Tampa participated in the rescue efforts during the disaster.

Crotty was also assigned cutters based out of Seattle, Washington; Alaska, where he had a Justice Department appointment as a special deputy on the Bering Sea Patrol; and Sault Ste. Marie, Michigan. In April 1941, Crotty reported to the United States Navy's Mine Warfare School in Yorktown, Virginia. He subsequently attended additional training at the Mine Recovery Unit in Washington, D.C., which made him the top Coast Guard expert in mine operations, explosives and demolition.

== World War II ==
=== Philippines campaign ===
On October 28, 1941, Crotty arrived at Cavite Navy Yard in the Philippines, where he was assigned to the In-Shore-Patrol Headquarters to assist the Navy in building the Manila Bay minefield. On December 7, 1941, Japanese forces attacked Pearl Harbor and the United States entered World War II. Several hours later, across the International Date Line on December 8, Japanese troops invaded the Philippines. On December 10, Japanese aircraft bombed Cavite Navy Yard, damaging many of the facilities. Crotty was the only Coast Guardsman stationed in the Philippines and consequently the only Coast Guardsman to participate in the Philippines campaign.

As American troops began retreating to the Bataan Peninsula and the island of Corregidor, Lieutenant Crotty supervised the demolition of strategic facilities and equipment to prevent them from being captured by the Japanese. He also supervised the scuttling of the USS Sealion on December 25, before falling back to Fort Mills on Corregidor. Crotty continued returning to Cavite on night raids to destroy additional equipment before the area was occupied by the enemy.

From February to March 1942, Crotty served as the executive officer of the USS Quail. The USS Quail provided Naval gunfire support to American and Filipino troops at Bataan, shot down Japanese aircraft, and swept mines to allow the evacuation of critical personnel by American submarines. On April 9, the Japanese captured Bataan. The guns aboard the USS Quail were cannibalized and moved to Corregidor, while the ship was scuttled on May 5.

Lieutenant Crotty was in command of a 75mm shore battery manned by a mixed group of Marine and Army artillerymen. By May 6, the 75mm guns were overrun by the enemy and all of the defenders on Corregidor were captured by Japanese forces. Crotty became the first member of the Coast Guard to be held as a prisoner of war since the War of 1812.

=== Prisoner of war ===
Crotty and his fellow prisoners were held on Corregidor for several weeks, where they were placed on starvation diets. They also were required to bow to any Japanese soldier they crossed paths with, and would be beaten for various reasons, sometimes for no apparent reason at all. On May 24, the POWs were loaded onto landing barges and transported to Manila, where they were forced to march in a Japanese "Victory Parade" through the city.

The POWs were then packed into cattle cars and transported to the Cabanatuan prisoner of war camp. Many of the POWs did not survive the journey, and the conditions at the camp were abhorrent, as it was lacking medical supplies and other essential items. Crotty was remembered as being optimistic given the circumstances, however, he contracted diphtheria when an epidemic swept through the camp in the summer of 1942. Due to the lack of medical care, 40 prisoners died every day, including Thomas Crotty who died on July 19, 1942. He was buried in Common Grave 312. Nearly 3,000 POWs died at Cabanatuan.

== Post-war identification attempts ==
After the war, the 111th Quartermaster Graves Registration Platoon dug up the mass grave Crotty was buried in, identifying a dozen men using military IDs, dental records, and other evidence. The platoon was unable to identify many of the dead, including Crotty, whose remains were labeled "Unknown X-2858 Manila #2 Cemetery."

In 1948, Crotty's remains passed through the Manila Mausoleum and Central Identification Point, but were still unable to be identified. On August 8, 1949, Crotty was declared non-recoverable, and in 1952 his remains were buried in the Manila American Cemetery. His name was also put on the Walls of the Missing.

== Identification of remains ==
In 2009, Thomas Crotty's great nephew, Michael Kelly, in an attempt to identify Crotty's remains, reached out to the DOD agency responsible for recovering missing military personnel, the Defense POW/MIA Accounting Agency (DPAA). In 2017, the DPAA had Crotty's and other unknown remains disinterred and flown to Joint Base Pearl Harbor-Hickam, Hawaii.

The DPAA declared that "Unknown X-2858 Manila #2 Cemetery" was Thomas Crotty on September 10, 2019. The Armed Forces Medical Examiner System helped identify Crotty using DNA samples from his nephews and nieces. Crotty's remains were subsequently flown back to his hometown of Buffalo, arriving at Niagara Falls Air Force Base on November 1. Andrew Cuomo, the Governor of New York, ordered all state government buildings to fly their flags at half mast in honor of Crotty.

A funeral service was held at St. Thomas Aquinas Roman Catholic Church in Buffalo on November 2, 2019. Among those attending his funeral was Admiral Karl M. Schultz, the Commandant of the Coast Guard. Thomas Crotty was permanently buried at Holy Cross Cemetery in Lackawanna, New York.
