= Knockmealdown =

Mountain in County Waterford, Ireland

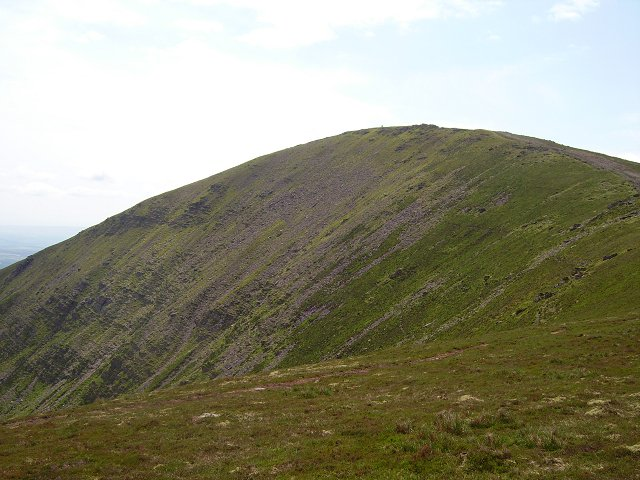
- Knockmealdown east face and summit The screes are steep and barren looking though sheep are grazing

Highest point
- Elevation: 792.4 m (2,600 ft)
- Prominence: 683 m (2,241 ft)
- Parent peak: Galtymore
- Listing: County top (Waterford), P600, Marilyn, Hewitt
- Coordinates: 52°13′41″N 7°54′57″W

Naming
- Native name: Cnoc Mhaoldomhnaigh
- English translation: hill of Maoldomhnaigh

Geography
- Location within Ireland
- Location: County Waterford, Ireland
- Parent range: Knockmealdown Mountains
- OSI/OSNI grid: S058084
- Topo map: OSi Discovery 74

Geology
- Mountain type: Medium grained pink-purple sandstone bedrock

Climbing
- Easiest route: hiking

Knockmealdown (Irish: Cnoc Mhaoldomhnaigh, meaning 'hill of Maoldomhnach') is the highest peak of the Knockmealdown Range of mountains, located on the border between counties Tipperary and Waterford.

== Geography ==
The peak itself is located in County Waterford and is the highest point in that county. However, since the county border generally follows the summit line the main peaks are actually in both county Tipperary and in County Waterford (OSI Discovery Map 75).

== Name ==
Knockmealdown is the Anglicised form of an older Irish name. The original Irish name is widely believed to be Cnoc Mhaoldomhnaigh, meaning "Muldowneys' hill". It has also been suggested that it is derived from Cnoc Maol Donn, meaning "bald brown hill". In 1654, the name was recorded as Knockmealdowny, indicating there was an extra syllable at the end.

== Hill walking ==
The peak is easily accessed from the west, via the layby overlooking Bay Lough on the Vee Gap. This involves first climbing Sugarloaf Hill. It may also be climbed by following the Glannandaree stream from the carpark at the point where the R668 and R669 roads meet.

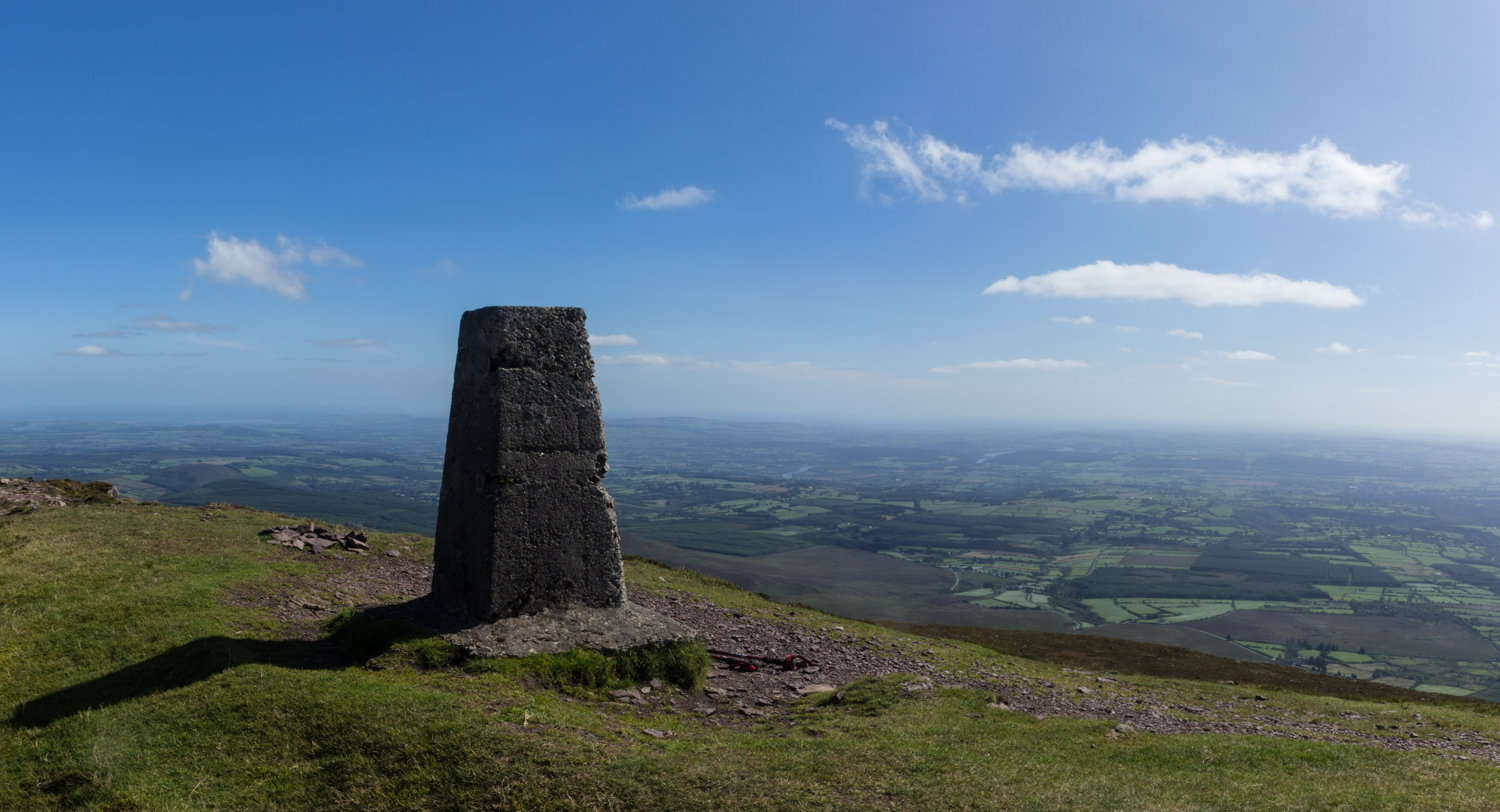
Summit of Knockmealdown

== See also ==
- Lists of mountains in Ireland
- List of Irish counties by highest point
- List of mountains of the British Isles by height
- List of P600 mountains in the British Isles
- List of Marilyns in the British Isles
- List of Hewitt mountains in England, Wales and Ireland
