= Technology gap =

International trade theory

Technology Gap Theory is a model developed by M.V. Posner in 1961, which describes an advantage enjoyed by the country that introduces new goods in a market. The country will enjoy a comparative advantage as well as a temporary state of monopoly until other countries have achieved the ability to imitate the new good. Unlike the past theories which assume the market to be fixed and given, such as the Heckscher-Ohlin theory, the technology gap model addresses the technological changes. It suggests a state of economy influenced by science, politics, markets, culture and most importantly, uncertainty, which threatens the mainstream neoclassical economists as they explain economic outcomes mainly based on the natural endowment scarcity. The theory is backed up by the ideas of Joseph Schumpeter. As a result, the technology gap theory is often rejected by neoclassical economists.

The theory assumes that the two countries have similar factor endowments, demand conditions, and factor price ratios before trade. The only difference is the technique. The technology gap exists between the time the new products are imported from external markets and the substitutes are created by domestic producers. Meanwhile, according to Ponser, the gap is constituted by three lags as follows:

1. Foreign Reaction Lag: The time required for the innovative firms to produce the products with new technology, and these products will later be exported to external countries.
2. Domestic Reaction Lag: The time taken by all domestic firms to continue producing relatively newer versions of products as to retain their shares in the global market, before they realize the threat of the new products imported. Within the period, there is also an imitation lag, which suggests the time the local entrepreneurs need to learn to adopt the new technology to make and sell substitutes.
3. Demand Lag: The time that the domestic consumers need to acquire or adapt their tastes for the new products.

The total lag is calculated by subtracting the demand lag from the imitation lag. If the demand lag is longer than the imitation lag, then the domestic market will start to demand the foreign goods. The demand of imported goods overriding the domestic products will in turn leads to the erosion of the local market and deficit in the trade balance.

== History ==
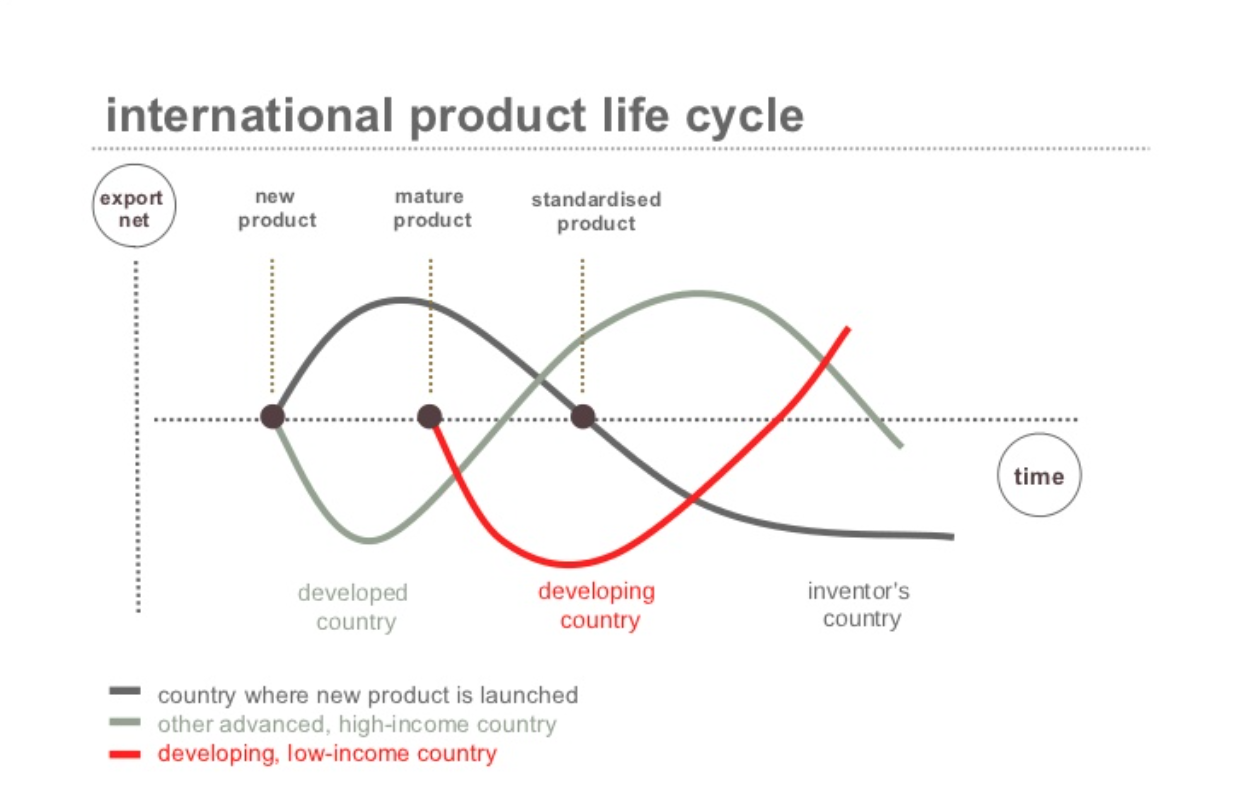
Fig.1 The International Product Life Cycle by Raymond Vernon

The development of an explicit technology gap model started with Ponser. The key for the theory is the rate of diffusion of technology. Moving on to 1966, Vernon further extended the technology gap model into the product life-cycle theory. The degree of maturity of the technology became the new key of the dynamic economic trade. Vernon's theory resonances with the technology gap theory. As Fig1. shows, at the new-product phase, the product is only produced and consumed in the innovating countries, usually the developed countries. But, as the product matures, the imitating countries, usually the developing countries, intervenes the market by underselling the products. The production of the product gradually gets standardized and the innovating countries can no longer monopolize the market.

In 1981, Pasinetti proposed a Ricardian comparative advantage model that emphasizes on the rate of innovation. Later, Dosi and his colleagues affirmed technology gap as the heart of absolute advantage in 1990. Moreover, Dosi et al. complicated the definition of diffusion, which makes a smooth diffusion process does not exist anymore. The new definition now writes as: the "process of learning, modification of the existing organization of production and, often, even a modification of products."

== Between countries ==
Technological changes is cumulative, path-dependent, and non-specific for each country. Thus, it is hardly sharable between nations. Nowadays, it can determine the competence of a nation to a great extent, and influence demand conditions and technological policies. As a result, the technology gap theory strongly emphasizes on the role of government in prompting innovations.

United States, as one of the most technologically advanced nations in the world, exports a variety of new technology to conquer the global market. Most of the time, other countries acquire the same technology sooner or later. With lower labor costs, U.S. no longer hold the comparative advantage in making the same products. However, U.S. producers can keep on introducing new technology to the markets abroad and new technology gap will be formed during the process.

As long as the new technology is diffused to developing countries, the globalization will have a positive impact on them, otherwise, the domestic market will only be harmed. African countries, for example, Kenya, are currently suffering from the technology gap not only globally but also domestically. Organizations, such as the United Nations, are now working hard to bind such gaps within nations.

When comparing the technology gap between countries, let us take a look at Armenia and Belarus. One may think that they should have the same level of technology, as both are post-Soviet developing countries that have more or less the same GDP per capita. However, Belarus exported between $150 and $250 per capita in ICT services during 2017, while the same metric for Armenia was only $72. Just to compare, this number was more than $1000 for developed countries in the same time period. This shows that Armenia has still a long path to go. However, we cannot forget the fact that from 2009 to 2017, the countries exports of ICT services skyrocketed from $94 million to $212 million. Nonetheless, other high-tech exports (aerospace, electrical machinery, pharmaceuticals) accounted solely for $26 million in 2017. If looking at GDP components, Armenian ICT exports counted for 11 percent of total service exports and just 4.8 percent of goods and services exports in 2017. The above-mentioned comparison, highlights two important facts: first, two countries that can have similar histories or income per capita may still differ in their technological advancement and second, even when the country's technological advancement progresses quickly, it still needs to strive for improvement, as the world goes into new era of industrialization.

== Between companies ==
Unlike between countries, technological changes between firms are specific. It is can be measured by the ability of the firm to produce and innovate. Companies, such as pwc, offer surveys and solutions to help alleviate the gap between business and technology, which will also lead to enhanced communication and creativity of the whole business, and making the enterprise more competitive in the market.

The 5G is an example demonstrating impact of technology gap on and between businesses. In accordance with the theory, the vice president and global innovation officer at Cisco said that "There is not any one country, one company or one continent that’s going to own 5G...I just don’t want the focus to be all about 5G and who gets to the finish line, the sprint first, because there’s a much longer race after that.”

Let us take the example of Armenia once again. There is a high technological gap between several Armenian banks. For example, while Central Bank of Armenia has advanced ints settlement and clearing processes by introducing quality automation services, some banks still process the majority of their payments by hand. This technology gap is actually detrimental for the banks using traditional recording method, as because of this high costs are incurred, which have direct effect on bank reliability, profitability and solvency. To sum up this example, it is very important that the automation processes must be implemented in the inter-bank level, as they will first of all provide better customer experience and service by reducing errors and waiting time and secondly all companies in the industry need to be normalized and standardized in the same way. Thus, this example shows that technological gap can exist between companies in the same industry and they can present serious issues that, in some cases, can be fatal for the companies.

== Limitations ==
- The theory does not account for the size of technological gaps in a precise manner.
- The theory fails to illustrate why technology gap exists and how it diminishes over time.

== See also ==
- Internationalization
