= Van Dyne Crotty =

American uniform laundering and rental company

Van Dyne Crotty Inc. was a uniform laundering and rental company in the United States, trading from 1935 to 2006. Founded by Lloyd Van Dyne and Fergus Crotty, on January 1, 1935, during the height of the Great Depression, the company grew from a $500 loan into one of the premier privately owned uniform companies in the United States. Van Dyne Crotty remained a family-owned and operated business, run by Van Dyne and Crotty, and then by 2 further generations of the Crotty family, until its sale in 2006 to Cintas Corporation (Nasdaq: CTAS).

== Establishment ==
In 1934, Lloyd Van Dyne and Fergus Crotty met at a small business on Richard Street in Dayton, OH, that washed rags for local gas stations and industrial customers. Van Dyne and Crotty helped run the office and sales for the company, and within a year decided they could do a better job running the business on their own. On New Year's Day, 1935, Van Dyne and Crotty secured a $500 loan from their landlady and purchased the business, renaming it "Van Dyne-Crotty."

== First Generation ==
Van Dyne and Crotty grew the business over the next three decades, despite several large setbacks. During World War II, the company's only plant had to be shut down, due to wartime restrictions. Just a few years later, a fire destroyed the entire facility. Van Dyne and Crotty continued to operate a lean and successful business, however. Lloyd Van Dyne was known for saying “you have to hit rock bottom before you can go up.”

Van Dyne and Crotty expanded the business by growing their clientele from full service gas stations to manufacturing plants like NCR, Delco Products, Frigidaire and the numerous tool and die shops that supported the automotive manufacturing industry in Southwest Ohio; and later by introducing new innovations to the industry, such as the first standardized industrial wiping cloth, and new advances in dry cleaning technology.

In the space of a few decades, Van Dyne and Crotty were able to grow their initial $500 investment into a $2–3 million business. Van Dyne-Crotty is also credited as being the first company east of the Mississippi River to rent an entrance mat, also known as a "walk off mat." Lloyd Van Dyne died on April 28, 1962, and Fergus Crotty followed just months later. The company was passed on to Fergus' three sons: Robert, Frank and L. William Crotty.

== Second Generation ==
Robert Crotty left the family business, and in the early 1970s, L. William (Bill) Crotty and his brother Frank divided the company (then generating $8–10 million in revenue per year) into Van Dyne Crotty Company in Columbus, Ohio (led by Frank) and Van Dyne Crotty Inc. (led by L. William). Over the next two decades, both brothers grew their companies geographically. L. William Crotty expanded to Cincinnati and Lima, OH, with an additional glove renovation drop-off location in Toledo, and Frank added an office in Akron, OH.

Through the 1970s and 1980s, Van Dyne Crotty Inc. continued to grow geographically, and to diversify into new markets, including glove renovation for heavy industry and textile leasing. Building on the foundation of his father and Lloyd Van Dyne, Bill continued to run the company in a way that rewarded employees for performance.

In the late 1970s, Bill’s three sons joined the family business, with Dan Crotty leading the Toledo office, Kevin Crotty in Lima and Robert at the corporate office in Dayton, OH. Bill grew the privately held Van Dyne Crotty Inc. from $4 million per year in revenues to $25–30 million.

In 1991, leadership of the company passed to his sons. Daniel (Dan) Crotty became President and eventually CEO, Kevin Crotty was Executive VP, and Robert (Bob) Crotty became VP of Sales and Marketing. During this time the company expanded its operations into Florida, purchasing Warren Uniform in Pompano Beach.

== Third Generation ==
Under the leadership of Dan, Kevin and Bob, the company became laser-focused in the highly competitive uniform rental industry. The marketing tagline was changed from "The Very Fabric of American Industry" to "First in Lasting Impressions" and finally into "Uniforms That Work®".

Van Dyne Crotty’s uniform business grew during the 1990s and the company grew to encompass 7 distinct brands within the apparel industry, as well as two subsidiary companies:

- Uniforms That Work® - Van Dyne Crotty’s primary uniform rental brand
- Floor Mat Systems – industrial floor mat rental
- Health and Hygiene Services – commercial restroom supplies
- VDC Direct – direct marketing of a full line of apparel via catalog sales
- Corporate Apparel Programs – dedicated sales and service to high-volume chain and national accounts
- GOCasual.com – online sales of business casual apparel
- Industrial Services – furnishing and cleaning reusable textiles for the printing industry
- First Aid Select – first aid and safety products
- Ritz Safety – industrial safety supply distributor, purchased in 1999 from the Merkl family

In 1998, Chairman Bill Crotty established the L. William Crotty Center for Entrepreneurial Leadership at The University of Dayton School of Business Administration. Ranked as one of the top programs in the country for students who want to learn how to start their own business, this Center continues to operate and help prepare young entrepreneurs today.

By 2000, the third generation of Crotty’s had grown Van Dyne Crotty to some 20 locations. Under the leadership of Dan, Kevin and Bob, Van Dyne Crotty became known as a leader in innovation and technology in the apparel rental industry. Their 12 processing locations (many of which were built from the ground up) served as examples of quality, lasting engineering. The company eventually grew to around 1,300 employees and was organized into three key product families: Apparel Solutions, Facility Solutions and First Aid & Safety Services. Under the leadership of the third generation Crotty’s, the company grew from $30 million in annual sales to $130 million. During the 2000s, a new generation of the Crotty family was being raised in the family business, as Colin Crotty (son of Kevin) joined as a General Manager.

Van Dyne Crotty was sold on February 10, 2006 to publicly traded Cintas Corporation (Nasdaq: CTAS). The sale included 20 uniform rental operations and 5 Select First Aid operations. The Ritz Safety division was retained by Daniel and Robert Crotty, and has continued to expand through organic growth, geographic expansion and strategic acquisitions.
