= Knockmealdown Mountains =

Mountain range in the south of Ireland

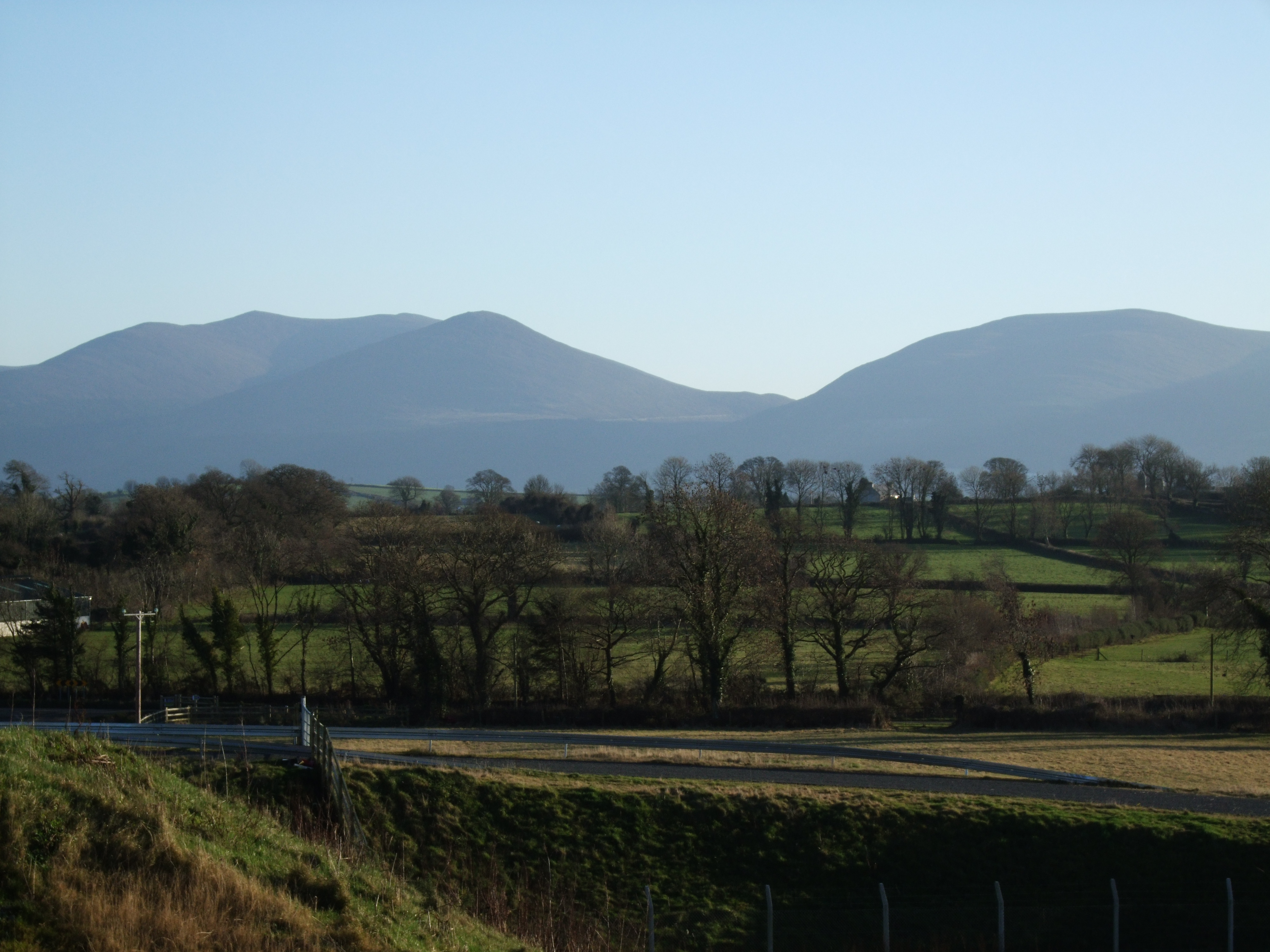
- The Knockmealdowns from the M8

Highest point
- Peak: Knockmealdown
- Elevation: 794 m (2,605 ft)
- Coordinates: 52°14′N 7°55′W

Naming
- Native name: Sléibhte Chnoc Mhaoldomhnaigh

Geography
- Location within Ireland
- Country: Ireland
- Province: Munster

The Knockmealdown Mountains (Irish: Sléibhte Chnoc Mhaoldomhnaigh) are a mountain range located on the border of counties Tipperary and Waterford in Ireland, running east and west between the two counties. The highest peak of the range is Knockmealdown, in County Waterford. On the western side of the summit, the range is crossed by a high pass called ‘The Vee’ through which runs the old mail coach road from Lismore to Clogheen.

The mountains were formerly known as Sliabh gCua, sometimes anglicized 'Slieve Gua' or 'Slieve Goe'.

== Mountain peaks ==
List of peaks in the Knockmealdown Mountains ordered by height:

- Knockmealdown, Cnoc Mhaoldomhnaigh (794 m)
- Knockmoylan, Cnoc Maoláin (768 m)
- Knocknafallia, Cnoc na Faille (668 m)
- Sugarloaf Hill, Cnoc na gCloch (663 m)
- Knocknagnauv, Cnoc na gCnámh (655 m)
- Knockshanahullion, Cnoc Seanchuillinn (652 m)
- Knocknalougha, Cnoc na Loiche (630 m)
- Knockmeal, An Cnoc Maol (560 m)
- Crohan West, An Cruachán (521 m)
- Farbreaga, An Fear Bréige (518 m)

== Wildlife ==
This mountain range is an important breeding ground for two endangered species, the red grouse and the hen harrier; cuckoo, nightjar, crossbill, buzzard and grasshopper warbler can also be seen.

== Research and documentation efforts ==
In 2023, the Knockmealdown Active initiative, working with Irish Uplands Forum, completed a digital story map of Knockmealdown Mountains. The effort was sponsored by the Heritage Council and is a compilation of written stories, drone footage and geospatial information into an interactive web page.
