= Comeragh Mountains =

Mountain range in Ireland

Coordinates: 52°17′N 7°34′W

- Na Comaraigh
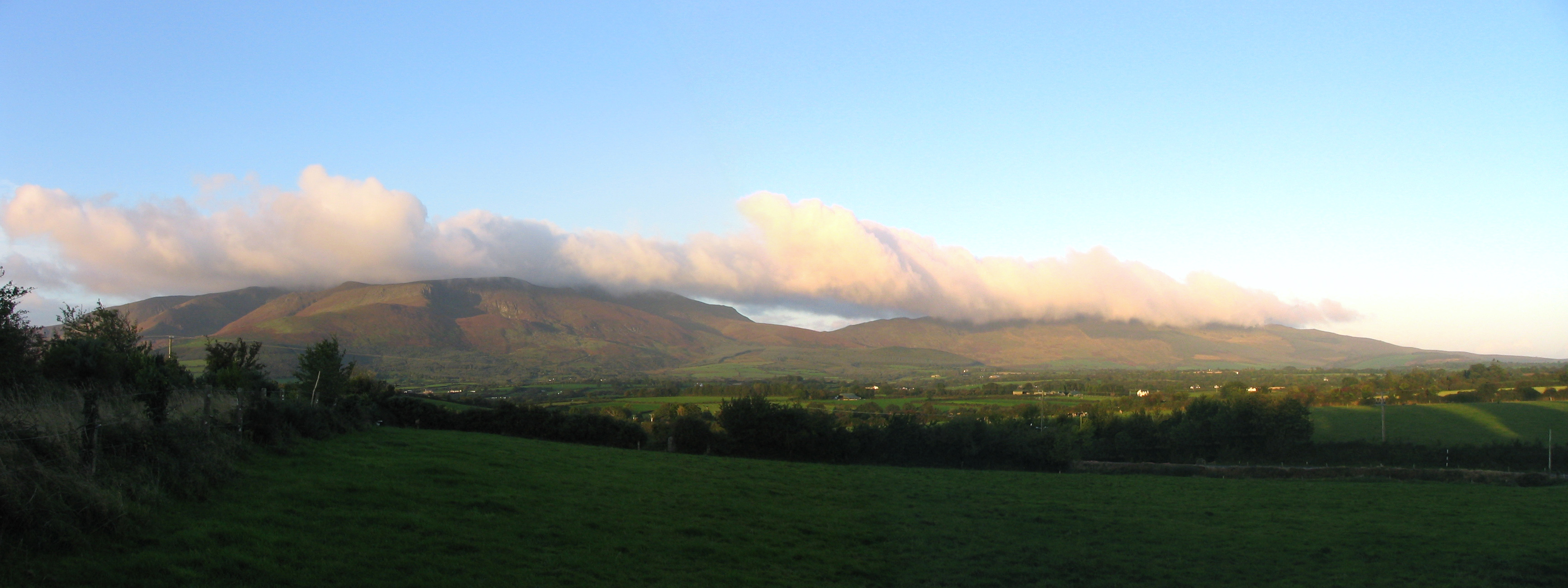
- Comeragh Mountains

Highest point
- Peak: Fauscoum
- Elevation: 792 m (2,598 ft)
- Prominence: 622 m (2,041 ft)

Geography
- Location: County Waterford, Republic of Ireland

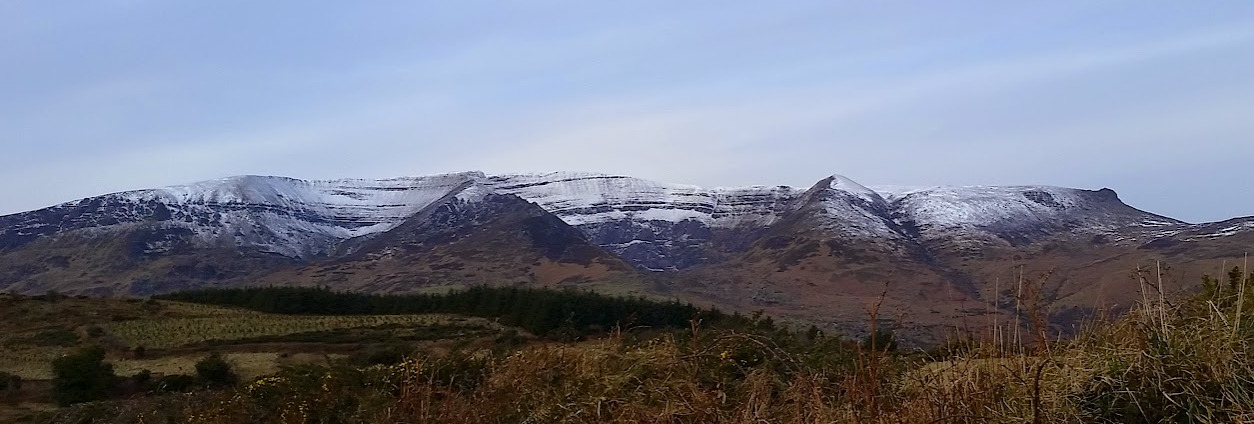
The Comeraghs in February 2015

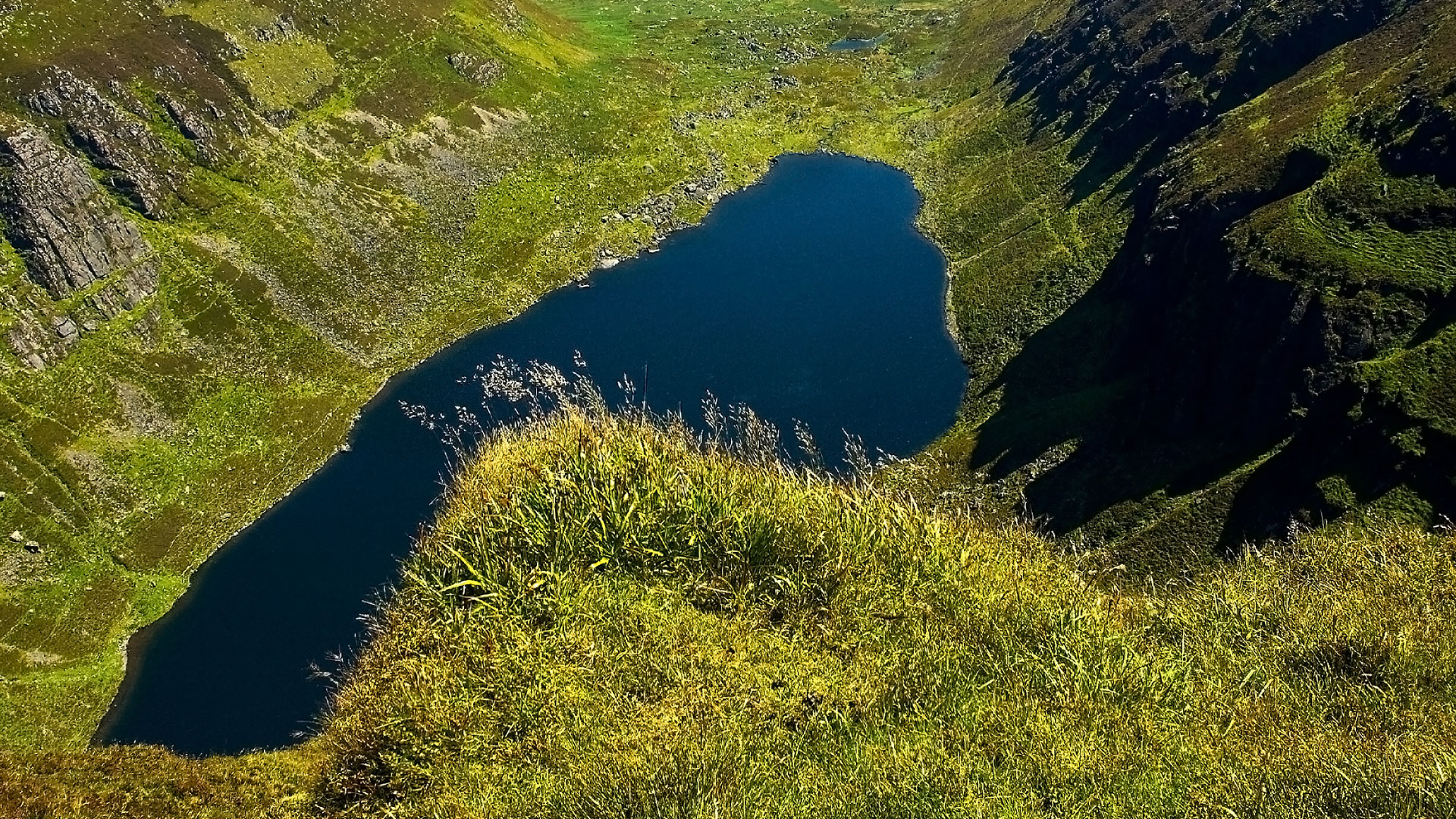
Comeragh Mountains

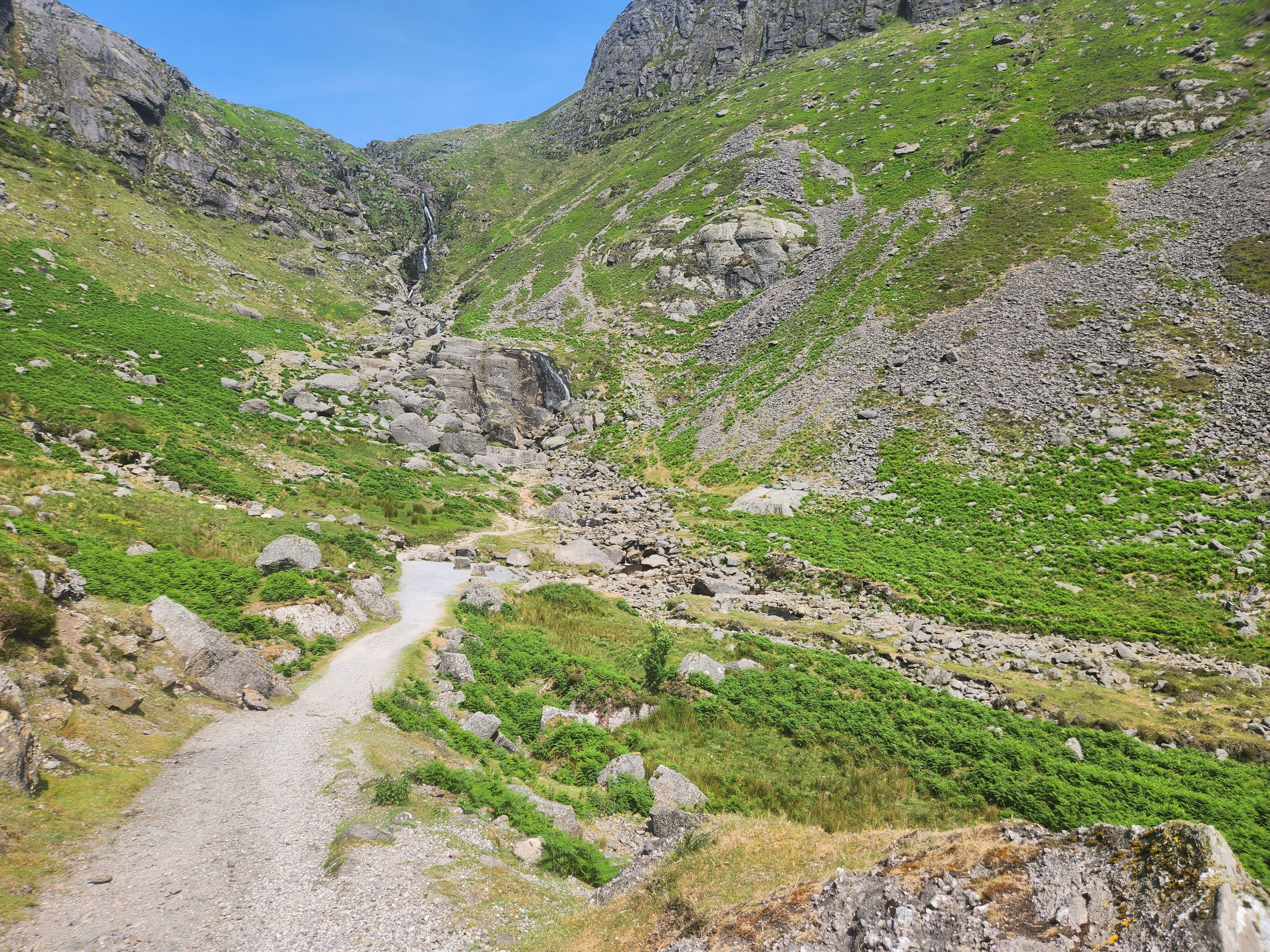
Mahon Falls

The Comeragh Mountains (Irish: Na Comaraigh or Sléibhte an Chomaraigh) is a glaciated mountain range in County Waterford in the southeast of Ireland. They are made up of two mountain ranges and include the Comeraghs themselves and Monavullagh Mountains (Irish: Móin an Mhullaigh, meaning 'bog of the summit') to the south.

They are located between the town of Dungarvan and stretch inland to the town of Clonmel on the County Tipperary border and the villages of Kilrossanty and Kilmacthomas in County Waterford.

The mountains which form the Comeragh Mountains are popular for mountain climbers and hikers.

The Comeragh Mountains Walking Festival is held every October and is centred on the Nire Valley.

The Comeragh's Wild Festival is held every summer and is based mainly in the Mahon Valley and Rathgormack.

== Peaks ==
The peaks in the Comeragh Mountains, ordered by height, from the Lists of mountains in Ireland:

- Fauscoum, Fáschom (792m)
- Carrignagower, Carraig na nGabhar (767m)
- Knockanaffrin, Cnoc an Aifrinn (755m)
- Coumfea, Coum Fia (742m)
- Seefin, Suí Finn (726m)
- Knockaunapeebra, (724m)
- Knocksheegowna, (678m)
- Coumaraglin, (617m)
- Laghtnafrankee (520m)

Other Mountains and Hills:

- Crohaun (Monavullaghs), (484m)
- Deelish (Monavullaghs)
- Croughaun Hill, Cruachán Paorach or Cruachán (391m)

== Geography ==
=== Rivers ===
The Mahon River rises on the plateau above Mahon Falls and flows southwards through Crough Woods, Mahon Bridge, and Kilmacthomas to the sea at Bonmahon.

The Nire River flows through the Nire Valley, to the west of the Comeraghs.

The River Clodiagh rises in Lough Coumduala and flows east through Rathgormack, Portlaw and joins the River Suir near Portlaw.

The Colligan River rises in the Monavullagh Mountains and flows southwards to the sea at Dungarvan.

The Tay river rises in Coumtay and flows into the sea at Stradbally.

The Dalligan River rises at Coumarraglin and flows past Glendalligan, under the Ballyvoile Viaduct and into the sea at Ballyvoile.

=== Lakes and features ===
Mahon Falls is an 80m-waterfall near the start of the Mahon River and the U-shaped glacial valley is popular with walkers and hikers.

Coumshingaun is one of the deepest glacial coums in Europe with a corrie lake and 400m high steep rock walls on three sides. This U-shaped valley was formed during the quaternary (Ice Age)

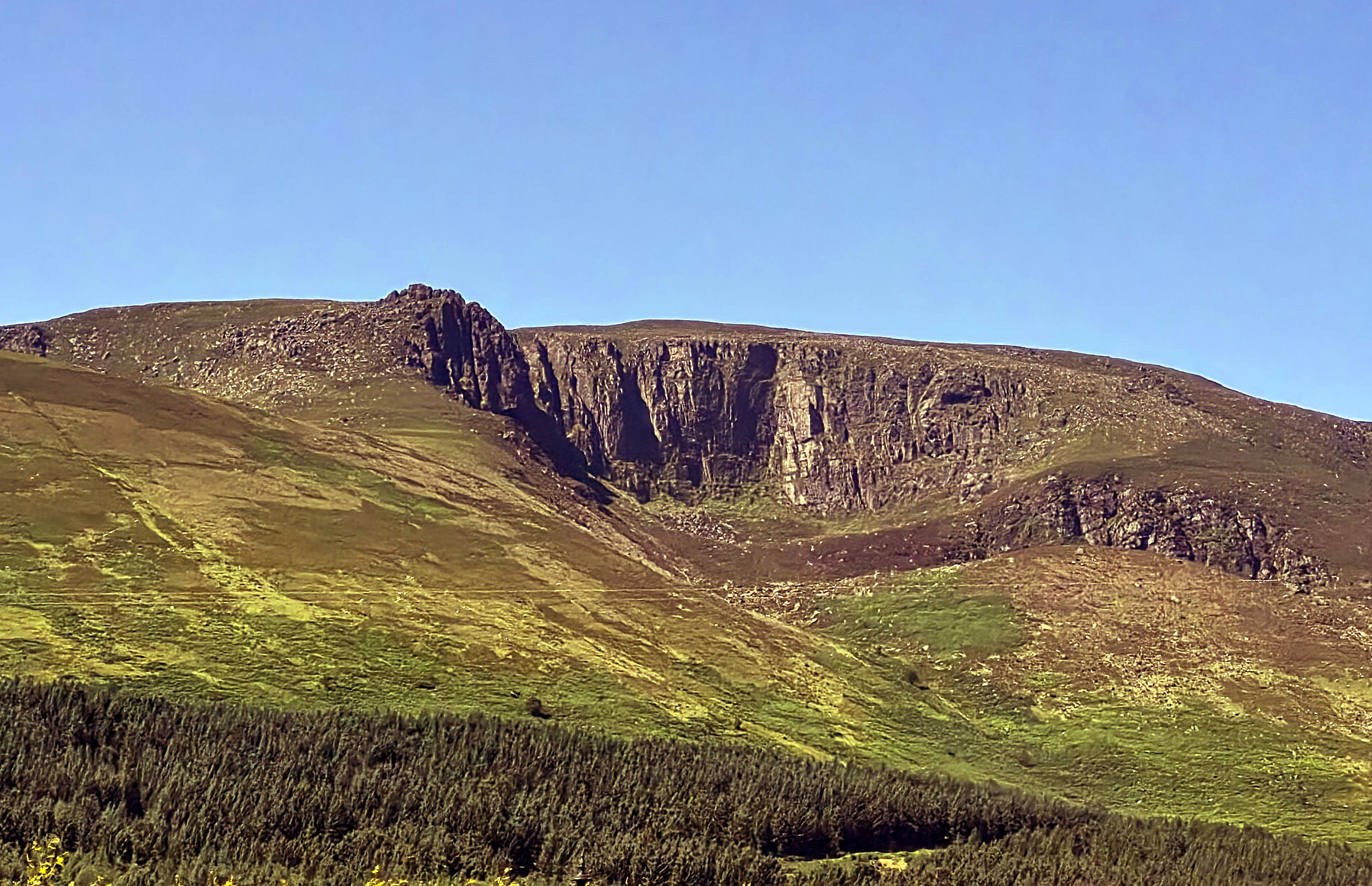
Crotty's Rock and the Coum containing Crotty's Lake in the Comeragh Mountains

Crotty's Lake and Crotty's Rock are features in the east of the Comeraghs which take their names from William Crotty ("Crotty the Robber"), a highwayman who was hanged in Waterford in 1742.

The plateau is skirted by several deep corries containing other high altitude lakes, including Lough Coumfea, Coumalocha lake, Lough Coumduala, Lough Mohra, the Sgilloge Loughs, the seven sister Coumtay lakes, and the Coum Iarthar Loughs.

== Geology ==
=== Formation ===
The Comeragh Mountains is a mountain plateau of Old Red Sandstone, which has been heavily sculpted and scarred by glaciers. The Comeragh Mountains are among the oldest mountains in Ireland (formed approximately 500 million years ago) and along with the Slieve Bloom Mountains would have been among the highest in Ireland.

=== Glaciation and erosion ===
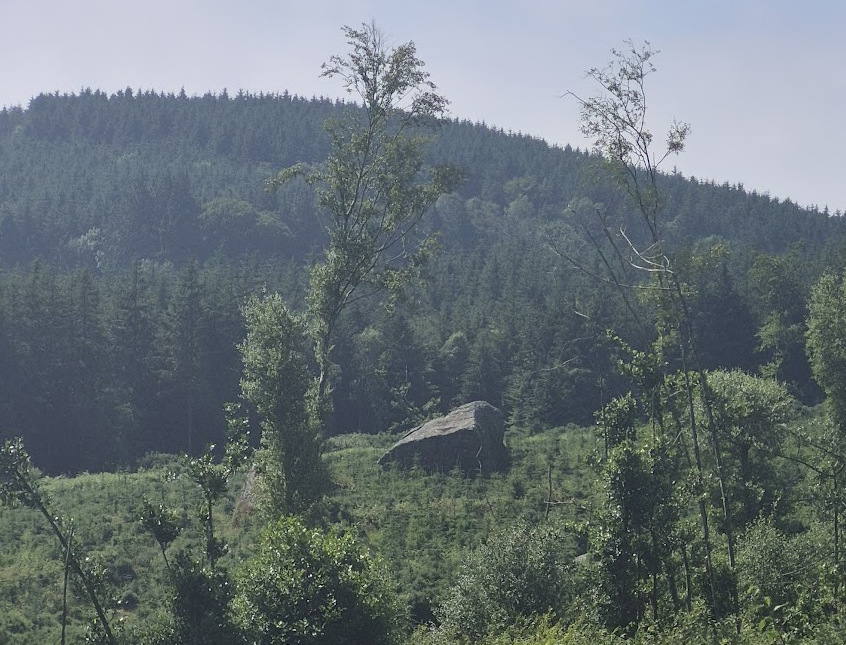
An erratic boulder near Coumshingaun in the Comeragh Mountains, dropped by a glacier as it moved down the mountain.

There are many features in the area indicative of glacial action and erosion including U-shaped valleys, aretes, erratic rocks. This happened quite recently in geological time, with the last Ice Age ending approx 12,000 years ago.

== Ecology ==
The Comeragh Mountains are designated as a Special Area of Conservation. The key areas of interest are oligotrophic waters, water courses with Callitricho-Batrachion vegetation, various examples of atlantic wet and dry heaths, Alpine and Boreal heaths and wet blanket bogs. There are also various notable habitats of scree and rocky slope.

=== Wildlife ===
According to the National Parks and Wildlife Service (NWPS), peregrine falcon, a species listed on Annex I of the E.U. Birds Directive, breeds within Coumshingaun, as does raven and hen harrier. buzzards are also common in the area.

=== Flora ===
The heath area is covered largely in heather with other forms of vegetation discouraged by grazing of sheep and wild deer and feral goats.

There are many notable and rare plants to be found in the Comeragh Mountains, including mossy saxifrage (Saxifraga hypnoides), slender green feather-moss and threatened bryophyte species. Coumshingaun contains stonewort, Nitella flexilis, and also bog pondweed.
