= Limerick county hurling team =

Irish hurling team

Limerick
- Sport: Hurling
- Irish: Luimneach
- Nickname(s): The Treaty County; The Shannonsiders
- County board: Limerick GAA
- Manager: John Kiely
- Captain: Cian Lynch
- Home venue(s): Gaelic Grounds, Limerick

Recent competitive record
- Current All-Ireland status: 2026 Winners
- Last championship title: 2026
- Current NHL Division: 1A (1st in 2026)
- Last league title: 2026
First colours	Second colours

The Limerick county hurling team represents Limerick in hurling and is governed by Limerick GAA, the county board of the Gaelic Athletic Association. The team competes in the three major annual inter-county competitions; the All-Ireland Senior Hurling Championship, the Munster Senior Hurling Championship and the National Hurling League.

Limerick's home ground is Páirc na nGael, Limerick. The team's manager is John Kiely.

The team last won the Munster Senior Championship in 2026, the All-Ireland Senior Championship in 2026 and the National League in 2026.

== History ==
Limerick's first outright success in hurling was achieved when the Kilfinane club defeated Kilkenny GAA club Tullaroan in the final of the 1897 All-Ireland Senior Hurling Championship (SHC). At that time, counties were represented by champion clubs.

Limerick won the 1918 All-Ireland SHC, then repeated the feat in the 1921 All-Ireland SHC when the team won the inaugural Liam MacCarthy Cup. The team that achieved those wins featured many players who contested eight consecutive Munster Senior Hurling Championship (SHC) finals (1917–1924 inclusive), a record that has never been equalled.

The 1930s were the salad days of Limerick hurling, an era in which the county won five consecutive National Hurling League (NHL) titles, a record still unequalled. Those titles were won in 1933–34, 1934–35, 1935–36, 1936–37 and 1937–38. Limerick also won four consecutive Munster SHC titles, and remains the only team other than Cork to have done so. After winning All-Ireland SHC titles in 1934 and in 1936, another All-Ireland SHC title followed in 1940. The team from this era did much to raise the profile of the sport: whereas around 30,000 people attended the 1930 All-Ireland SHC Final, attendances had risen to 50,000 by the 1940 final and players such as the Mackeys (John and Mick), Ryans (Timmy and Mick), Clohesseys (Dave and Paddy), Bob McConkey and Paddy Scanlon were recalled for decades afterwards. Victory in 1940 left Limerick with six All-Ireland SHC titles and as the only team from outside the "big three" (Cork, Tipperary and Kilkenny) to have won more than one All-Ireland SHC title. Dublin had at that stage also six All-Ireland SHC titles but no native of that county had played on any of its winning teams. Limerick won a sixth NHL title in 1946–47 but success soon became a rarity.

Limerick won the 1970–71 NHL title and soon followed this by winning the 1973 All-Ireland SHC, its seventh title. Four further NHL titles followed that century: 1983–84, 1984–85, 1991–92 and, lastly, 1997.

In the early 2000s, Limerick won three consecutive All-Ireland Under-21 Hurling Championship titles (2000–2002).

In 2007, Limerick defeated Tipperary in a Munster SHC semi-final known as the Trilogy, as three games were required to separate the teams. The final scoreline of the second replay was 0–22 to 2–13. An attendance of 30,608 spectators witnessed Limerick defeat Tipperary for the first time since 1996. Limerick had not won a match in the Munster SHC since a 2001 comeback against Waterford, to a Munster SHC final the team subsequently lost to the "monkey on their back" or, as Seamus Hickey referred to them, "gorilla", Tipperary. However, Limerick subsequently lost the Munster SHC final to Waterford in Thurles on 8 July. The team regrouped and, in its All-Ireland SHC quarter-final on 29 July, defeated Clare by a scoreline of 1–23 to 1–16. Andrew O'Shaughnessy was named man of the match. On 12 August, Limerick played Waterford in the All-Ireland SHC semi-final, a rematch of the Munster SHC final that had been played a month previously. The result, though, was not the same. Limerick defeated Waterford by a scoreline of 5–11 to 2–15. The goals came from Donie Ryan (2), Andrew O'Shaughnessy (2 - one from play and one penalty) and Brian Begley (1). O'Shaughnessy was again named man of the match. This result meant that Limerick had qualified for the 2007 All-Ireland SHC Final, held at Croke Park on 2 September. Kilkenny defeated Limerick by a scoreline of 2–19 to 1–15.

With many predicting that Limerick would soon secure Munster and All-Ireland SHC titles, the team was drawn against Clare in the first round of the 2008 Munster SHC. However, Clare won by a scoreline of 4–12 to 1–16, eliminating Limerick from the Munster SHC. That result also led to Limerick advancing to a game against Offaly, as part of a newly revised All-Ireland SHC qualifying system. Limerick lost again, this time by a scoreline of 3–19 to 0–18, and the team's season came to an end.

Limerick opened against Waterford in the 2009 Munster SHC, with the game ending in a draw. Limerick narrowly lost the replay. That result led to Limerick advancing to the 2009 All-Ireland SHC qualifier series, where they defeated Wexford and Laois in tight affairs, then Dublin in an All-Ireland SHC quarter-final, to reach an All-Ireland SHC semi-final against Tipperary. Tipperary won that game comfortably, by 22 points, and Limerick's season was over. In the weeks that followed manager Justin McCarthy dropped 12 players (who only found out via the Irish Examiner) and a further 12 players withdrew from the panel in protest and refused to return as long as McCarthy was in charge. The Limerick County Board held three meetings in which it was decided McCarthy would be retained. Limerick were relegated from Division 1 of the 2010 NHL, losing all eight games. Limerick lost to Cork in the first round of the Munster SHC, then lost to Offaly in a 2010 All-Ireland SHC qualifier. In total Limerick lost its 10 matches by an average of 15 points. McCarthy subsequently resigned as manager. In September 2010, Dónal O'Grady was appointed as manager.

Limerick improved dramatically in the 2011 NHL, winning nearly every game and being promoted to Division 1 only to later end up in Division 1B. Limerick lost against Waterford in the Munster SHC, with John Mullane eventually scoring a late goal. Limerick then advanced the 2011 All-Ireland SHC qualifiers, defeating Wexford and also (comprehensively) defeating Antrim, to reach an All-Ireland SHC quarter-final against NHL title holder Dublin. Dublin won that game by a scoreline of 3–13 to 0–18, ending Limerick's season. O'Grady resigned as manager a few months later over his determination that he intended to stay as coach for only one year.

In October 2011, John Allen was appointed as manager. Inadequate fitness levels contributed to defeats against Clare in the Division 1B Final and against Tipperary in the Munster SHC in Allen's first year. However, an extensive specifically designed summer fitness course led to a marked improvement, then a creditable losing performance against Kilkenny in the 2012 All-Ireland SHC quarter-final offered hope for 2013. As in 2012, Dublin (managed by Anthony Daly) defeated Limerick in the 2013 NHL Division 1B Final. That summer would bring a pitch invasion by spectators as Limerick won a first Munster SHC title since 1996. The celebrations contributed to a loss of focus, leading Clare to win the 2013 All-Ireland SHC semi-final against Limerick at Croke Park.

The 2018 season concluded with Limerick winning the 2018 All-Ireland SHC, the team's first since 1973, with a 3–16 to 2–18 point defeat of Galway in the final. The team built on this success, winning the NHL in 2019, 2020 and 2023, the Munster SHC in 2019, 2020, 2021 and 2022 and the All-Ireland SHC again in 2020, 2021 and 2022. Munster Senior Hurling Championship 2023, All Ireland Hurling Championship 2023 to be forever remembered the team to join the Cork hurling Champions of the 40s and the Kilkenny hurling Champions of the 2000s to complete 4 in a row.

== Supporters ==
Musician Bruce Springsteen is a Limerick supporter. Golfer Jim Furyk is a self-described "Limerick fan", and has been seen wearing a Limerick jersey in public. Dolores O'Riordan was another supporter. In the year of her death — when Limerick bridged a 45-year gap to win the 2018 All-Ireland SHC — "Zombie" by The Cranberries was adopted by the team as an anthem, and another Cranberries song, "Dreams", was immediately played at Croke Park to coincide with the post-final festivities, The team later brought the trophy to her family home. Actor Bill Murray attended the 2022 All-Ireland Senior Hurling Championship semi-final victory over Galway at Croke Park, wearing a Limerick jersey.

== Colours and crest ==
=== Kit evolution ===
Classic kit

Limerick made a limited edition jersey available in 2021 to commemorate the county's 1921 All-Ireland Senior Hurling Championship Final win, which coincided with the first presentation of the Liam MacCarthy Cup. An image of that trophy adorned the jersey's sleeve.

Limerick's jersey for the 2021 season went on sale on 24 March and had the titles of Limerick's 65 clubs across its front.

Limerick released a new jersey in advance of the 2023 season.

== Panel ==
Team as per Limerick vs Waterford in the All-Ireland SHC semi-final, 7 August 2021

No.	Player	Position	Club
1	Nicky Quaid	Goalkeeper	Effin
2	Seán Finn	Right corner-back	Bruff
3	Dan Morrissey	Full-back	Ahane
4	Barry Nash	Left corner-back	South Liberties
5	Diarmaid Byrnes	Right half-back	Patrickswell
6	Declan Hannon	Centre-back	Adare
7	Kyle Hayes	Left half-back	Kildimo-Pallaskenry
8	William O'Donoghue	Midfield	Na Piarsaigh
9	Darragh O'Donovan	Midfield	Doon
10	Gearóid Hegarty	Right half-forward	St Patrick's
11	Cian Lynch (c)	Centre-forward	Patrickswell
12	Tom Morrissey	Left half-forward	Ahane
13	Aaron Gillane	Right corner-forward	Patrickswell
14	Séamus Flanagan	Full-forward	Feohanagh
15	Peter Casey	Left corner-forward	Na Piarsaigh

No.	Player	Position	Club
16	Barry Hennessy	Substitute	Kilmallock
17	Conor Boylan	Substitute	Na Piarsaigh
18	Ronan Connolly	Substitute	Adare
19	Colin Coughlan	Substitute	Ballybrown
20	Richie English	Substitute	Doon
21	Robbie Hanley	Substitute	Kilmallock
22	Graeme Mulcahy	Substitute	Kilmallock
23	Aaron Costello	Substitute	Kilmallock
24	Cathal O'Neill	Substitute	Crecora
25	David Reidy	Substitute	Dromin-Athlacca
26	Pat Ryan	Substitute	Doon

^{INJ} Player has had an injury which has affected recent involvement with the county team.
^{RET} Player has since retired from the county team.
^{WD} Player has since withdrawn from the county team due to a non-injury issue.

=== Recent call-ups ===
Manager John Kiely named four new men in his squad ahead of the 2021 National Hurling League. Those not listed above are included below.

The following players have also been called up to the Limerick panel.

Pos.	Player	Club	Latest call-up
?	Colin Coughlan	Ballybrown	
?	Cathal O'Neill	Crecora-Manister	
?	Tom Hayes	Doon	
?	Barry Murphy	Doon	
DF	Paddy O'Loughlin	Kilmallock	v. Waterford, 13 December 2020, All-Ireland Championship Final

== Management team ==
As of December 2020:

- Manager: John Kiely
- Coach–selectors: Paul Kinnerk, Donal O'Grady, Aonghus O'Brien, Alan Cunningham
- Team performance psychologist: Caroline Currid
- Strength and conditioning coach: Mikey Kiely
- Goalkeeping coach: Timmy Houlihan
- Assistant goalkeeping coach: Alan Feeley
- Team doctor: James Ryan
- Physiotherapists: Mark Melbourne, Mark van Drumpt (Note: Mark van Drumpt died of cancer on 18 February 2021.)
- Video analyst: Seánie O'Donnell
- Liaison officer: Conor McCarthy
- Kitman: Ger O'Donnell
- Logistics: Éibhear O'Dea
- Nutritionist: Eoin Murray
- Masseur: Adrian Kearns
- Statistics: Kieran Hickey, Denny Ahern, Ruairí Maher

== Managerial history ==
Name	Club	From	To	All-Ireland titles	Munster titles	National League titles
Dick Stokes; Jackie Power; Sean Cunningham; Denis Barrett; Jim Quaid	Pallasgreen; Ahane; Doon; Bruff; Feohanagh-Castlemahon	1972	1975	1973	1973, 1974	
Dick Stokes; JP Ryan; John Mulcahy; Kevin Long; Phil Bennis	Pallasgreen; Garryspillane; Cappamore; Feenagh-Kilmeedy; Patrickswell	1975	1976			
Noel Drumgoole	Na Piarsaigh	1977	1982		1980, 1981	
Brother Michael O'Grady	Patrickswell	1982	1984			1983-84
Noel Drumgoole	Na Piarsaigh	1984	1986			1984-85
Éamonn Cregan	Claughaun	1986	1988			
Liam O'Donoghue; Donie Flynn; Tony Hickey	Mungret St. Pauls; Killeedy; Murroe-Boher	1988	1989			
Phil Bennis	Patrickswell	1989	1989			
Liam O'Donoghue; Donie Flynn; Tony Hickey	Mungret St. Pauls; Killeedy; Murroe-Boher	1989	1991			
Phil Bennis	Patrickswell	1991	1993			1991-92
Tom Ryan	Ballybrown	1993	1997		1994, 1996	1997
Éamonn Cregan	Claughaun	1997	2002			
David Keane	Adare	2002	2003			
Pad Joe Whelahan	Birr, Offaly	2003	2005			
Joe McKenna	South Liberties	2005	2006			
Richie Bennis	Patrickswell	2006	2008			
Justin McCarthy	Passage West, Cork	2008	2010			
Dónal O'Grady	St. Finbarr's, Cork	2010	2011			
John Allen	St. Finbarr's, Cork	2011	2013		2013	
TJ Ryan; Dónal O'Grady	Garryspillane; St. Finbarr's, Cork	2013	2014			
TJ Ryan	Garryspillane	2014	2016			
John Kiely	Galbally	2016	Present	2018, 2020, 2021, 2022, 2023, 2026	2019, 2020, 2021, 2022, 2023, 2024, 2026	2019, 2020, 2023, 2026

== Players ==
=== Records ===
==== Top scorers ====
Aaron_Gillane is Limerick's all-time top scorer in league and championship (with a total of 28–531 in 76 appearances as of 2024) overtaking Gary Kirby (with a total of 41–488 in 107 appearances).

=== All Stars ===
Limerick has 94 All Stars, as of 2024. 41 different players have won, as of 2024. Joe McKenna won six All Stars.

Bold denotes that a player also won Hurler of the Year for the year in question.

1971: Pat Hartigan, Éamonn Cregan
1972: Pat Hartigan^{2nd}, Éamonn Cregan^{2nd}
1973: Pat Hartigan^{3rd}, Jim O'Brien, Seán Foley, Richie Bennis, Éamonn Grimes
1974: Pat Hartigan^{4th}, Joe McKenna
1975: Pat Hartigan^{5th}, Joe McKenna^{2nd}, Éamonn Grimes^{2nd}
1978: Joe McKenna^{3rd}
1979: Joe McKenna^{4th}
1980: Leonard Enright, Joe McKenna^{5th}, Éamonn Cregan^{3rd}
1981: Leonard Enright^{2nd}, Liam O'Donoghue, Joe McKenna^{6th}
1983: Leonard Enright^{3rd}
1984: Paudie Fitzmaurice, Paddy Kelly
1991: Gary Kirby
1992: Tommy Quaid, Ciarán Carey
1994: Joe Quaid, Dave Clarke, Ciarán Carey^{2nd}, Mike Houlihan, Gary Kirby^{2nd}, Damien Quigley
1995: Gary Kirby^{3rd}
1996: Joe Quaid^{2nd}, Ciarán Carey^{3rd}, Mark Foley, Mike Houlihan^{2nd}, Gary Kirby^{4th}
2001: Mark Foley^{2nd}
2007: Brian Murray, Ollie Moran, Andrew O'Shaughnessy
2013: Richie McCarthy
2014: Seamus Hickey, Shane Dowling
2018: Seán Finn, Richie English, Dan Morrissey, Declan Hannon, Cian Lynch, Graeme Mulcahy
2019: Aaron Gillane, Seán Finn^{2nd}
2020: Nickie Quaid, Seán Finn^{3rd}, Dan Morrissey^{2nd}, Diarmaid Byrnes, Kyle Hayes, Gearóid Hegarty, Cian Lynch^{2nd}, Tom Morrissey, Aaron Gillane^{2nd}
2021: Seán Finn^{4th}, Barry Nash, Diarmaid Byrnes^{2nd}, Declan Hannon^{2nd}, Kyle Hayes^{2nd}, William O'Donoghue, Darragh O'Donovan, Gearóid Hegarty^{2nd}, Cian Lynch^{3rd}, Tom Morrissey^{2nd}, Séamus Flanagan, Peter Casey
2022: Nickie Quaid^{2nd}, Barry Nash^{2nd}, Diarmaid Byrnes^{3rd}, Declan Hannon^{3rd}, Gearóid Hegarty^{3rd}, Kyle Hayes^{3rd}, Aaron Gillane^{3rd}
2023: Dan Morrissey^{3rd}, Diarmaid Byrnes^{4th}, Kyle Hayes^{4th}, William O'Donoghue^{2nd}, Darragh O'Donovan^{2nd}, Tom Morrissey^{3rd}, Aaron Gillane^{4th}
2024:Nickie Quaid^{3rd}, Dan Morrissey^{4th}, Kyle Hayes^{5th}, Gearoid Hegarty^{4th}

== Honours ==
=== National ===
- All-Ireland Senior Hurling Championship
  - (gold) Winners (13): 1897, 1918, 1921, 1934, 1936, 1940, 1973, 2018, 2020, 2021, 2022, 2023, 2026
  - (silver) Runners-up (9): 1910, 1923, 1933, 1935, 1974, 1980, 1994, 1996, 2007
- National Hurling League
  - (gold) Winners (15): 1933–34, 1934–35, 1935–36, 1936–37, 1937–38, 1946–47, 1970–71, 1983–84, 1984–85, 1991–92, 1997, 2019, 2020, 2023, 2026
  - (silver) Runners-up (9): 1932–33, 1957–58, 1969–70, 1971–72, 1972–73, 1973–74, 1979–80, 1982–83, 2006
- All-Ireland Intermediate Hurling Championship
  - (gold) Winners (1): 1998
- All-Ireland Junior Hurling Championship
  - (gold) Winners (4): 1935, 1941, 1954, 1957
- All-Ireland Under-21 Hurling Championship
  - (gold) Winners (6): 1987, 2000, 2001, 2002, 2015, 2017
- All-Ireland Minor Hurling Championship
  - (gold) Winners (4): 1940, 1958, 1984, 2026
- All-Ireland Vocational Schools Championship
  - (gold) Winners (1): 1961 (Limerick City)
- Fr C. F. O'Reilly Cup (Poc Fada)
  - (gold) Winners (8): 1899, 1900, 1935, 1941, 1942, 1962, 1963, 1964

=== Provincial ===
- Munster Senior Hurling Championship
  - (gold) Winners (26): 1897, 1910, 1911, 1918, 1921, 1923, 1933, 1934, 1935, 1936, 1940, 1955, 1973, 1974, 1980, 1981, 1994, 1996, 2013, 2019, 2020, 2021, 2022, 2023, 2024, 2026
  - (silver) Runners-up (28): 1891, 1893, 1895, 1902, 1905, 1917, 1919, 1920, 1922, 1924, 1937, 1939, 1944, 1945, 1946, 1947, 1949, 1956, 1971, 1975, 1976, 1979, 1992, 1995, 2001, 2007, 2014, 2025
- Waterford Crystal Cup
  - (gold) Winners (2): 2006, 2015
- Munster Senior Hurling League
  - (gold) Winners (4): 2018, 2020, 2022, 2026
- Munster Intermediate Hurling Championship
  - (gold) Winners (3): 1968, 1998, 2008
- Munster Junior Hurling Championship
  - (gold) Winners (10): 1927, 1935, 1939, 1941,1946, 1948, 1952, 1954, 1957, 1986
- Munster Under-21 Hurling Championship
  - (gold) Winners (9): 1986, 1987, 2000, 2001, 2002, 2011, 2015, 2017, 2022
- Munster Minor Hurling Championship
  - (gold) Winners (9): 1940, 1958, 1963, 1965, 1984, 2013, 2014, 2019, 2020

=== Other ===
- Players Champions Cup
  - (gold) Winners (1): 2018
- RTÉ Sports Team of the Year Award
  - (gold) Winners (2): 2020, 2023
