= 2018 Limerick county hurling team season =

Limerick county hurling team 2018 season
- Irish: Luimneach
- Nickname(s): The Shannonsiders; The Treaty County
- Province: Munster
- Dominant sport: Hurling
- Ground(s): Gaelic Grounds, Limerick
- County colours: Green and white

County teams
- NHL: National Hurling League Division 1B
- Hurling Championship: All-Ireland Senior Hurling Championship

Regular kit
Change kit

The 2018 Limerick county hurling team season was the Limerick senior hurling team's 127th active season of participation in inter-county hurling. During the season, Limerick played in the Munster League, the National League, the Munster Championship and the All-Ireland Championship. It was the team's most successful season in nearly half a century.

Veteran players James Ryan and Gavin O'Mahony retired from inter-county hurling within days of each other at the end of the previous season, while 2017 championship panellist Stephen Cahill was also an absentee. Notable players returning included Kevin Downes, who missed the 2017 season due to a cruciate injury, and David Reidy, who rejoined the Limerick panel after a year with the Kildare senior hurling team. Other additions included several players from Limerick's 2017 All-Ireland Under-21 Championship-winning team, such as Séamus Flanagan.

On 19 August 2018, Limerick won the All-Ireland title for the 8th time in their history after a 3-16 to 2-18 defeat of Galway in the All-Ireland SHC final at Croke Park. Leading by nine points at one stage in the second half and by eight with just two minutes of normal time remaining, Limerick withstood a sensational Galway comeback, which included late goals by Conor Whelan and Joe Canning, to win by a single point. It was their first All-Ireland title since 1973.

Limerick were described as the "worthiest All-Ireland champions" of all time after playing eight games to win the title, including defeats of the traditional big three - Kilkenny, Cork and Tipperary - as well as the 2017 All-Ireland champions Galway and runners-up Waterford. Over 80,000 fans lined the streets of Limerick to welcome the team home the day after the final.

== Players and staff ==
=== Backroom staff ===
Position	Name
Manager	John Kiely
Selector	Brian Geary
Selector	Jimmy Quilty
Selector	Aaron Cunningham
Coach	Paul Kinnerk
Strength and conditioning coach	Joe O'Connor
Goalkeeping coach	Timmy Houlihan
Performance coach	Caroline Currid
Statistician	Seán O'Donnell
Statistician	Kieran Hickey
Statistician	Conor Reale
Statistician	Ruairí Maher
Logistics	Eamon O'Neill
Logistics	Conor McCarthy
Kitman	Ger O'Connell
Maor Camáin	Alan Feely
Doctor	James Ryan
Physio	Mark van Drumpt
Physio	Mark Melbourne

== All-Ireland Championship ==
=== Knockout stages ===
Date	Round	Opponents	Result	Scorers	Attendance
7 July 2018	Preliminary; Quarter-final	Carlow	5-22 - 0-13	A Gillane 1-6 (0-2fs), P Casey 1-3, T Morrissey 0-5, G Mulcahy, D Byrnes (0-1 '65') 1-1 each, K Hayes 1-0, G Hegarty 0-2, C Lynch, B Nash, S Flanagan, D O'Donovan 0-1 each.	6,000
14 July 2018	Quarter-final	Kilkenny	0-27 - 1-22	A Gillane 0-5 (2f), T Morrissey 0-4, K Hayes, G Mulcahy, G Hegarty, D O'Donovan (1 sideline) 0-3 each, P Casey 0-2, S Flanagan, D Byrne, D Hannon, S Dowling 0-1 each.	18,596
28 July 2018	Semi-final	Cork	3-32 - 2-31 (aet)	A Gillane 0-13 (0-7 fs); S Dowling (1-0 pen; 0-1 f) 1-4 (0-1 f); C Lynch 1-1; G Mulcahy 0-4; P Ryan 1-0; G Hegarty 0-3; D Byrne (f), D O’Donovan, S Flanagan, K Hayes, T Morrissey, B Nash, D Reidy 0-1.	71,073
19 August 2018	Final	Galway	3-16 - 2-18	G Mulcahy 1-2, K Hayes 0-4, T Morrissey 1-1, S Dowling 1-0, A Gillane 0-3 (0-2f), D Hannon 0-2, D Byrnes, D O’Donovan, C Lynch, S Flanagan 0-1 each.	71,073

== Statistics ==
=== Scorers ===
Player	Munster League		National League		Munster Ch.		All-Ireland Ch.		Overall	
Player	Score	Total	Score	Total	Score	Total	Score	Total	Score	Total
Aaron Gillane	1-21	24	6-67	85	0-10	10	1-27	30	8-125	149
Tom Morrissey	0-08	8	0-14	14	0-15	15	1-11	14	1-48	51
Séamus Flanagan	3-05	14	0-14	14	0-09	9	0-03	3	3-31	40
Graeme Mulcahy	—		2-04	10	1-06	9	2-10	16	5-20	35
Diarmaid Byrnes	0-03	3	1-13	16	0-06	6	1-04	7	2-26	32
Gearóid Hegarty	0-01	1	1-11	14	1-05	8	0-08	8	2-25	31
Shane Dowling	—		—		0-19	19	2-05	11	2-24	30
Cian Lynch	0-02	2	0-07	7	0-09	9	1-03	6	1-21	24
Kyle Hayes	—		1-03	6	0-05	5	1-08	11	2-16	22
Darragh O'Donovan	0-03	3	0-03	3	0-05	5	0-06	6	0-17	17
David Reidy	—		0-15	15	—		0-01	1	0-16	16
Barry Nash	1-07	10	0-01	1	—		0-02	2	1-10	13
Paul Browne	0-02	2	0-09	9	—		—		0-11	11
Pat Ryan	0-01	1	1-03	6	—		1-00	3	2-04	10
Peter Casey	—		—		—		1-05	8	1-05	8
Colin Ryan	—		0-06	6	—		—		0-06	6
Oisín O'Reilly	—		1-02	5	—		—		1-02	5
Barry O'Connell	0-01	1	0-04	4	—		—		0-05	5
Barry Murphy	—		0-01	1	1-00	3	—		1-01	4
Declan Hannon	0-01	1	—		—		0-03	3	0-04	4
Andrew La Touche Cosgrave	0-02	2	—		—		—		0-02	2
Dan Morrissey	—		—		0-02	2	—		0-02	2
Paddy O'Loughlin	0-01	1	—		—		—		0-01	1
David Dempsey	—		—		0-01	1	—		0-01	1
Total	5-58	73	13-177	216	3-92	101	11-96	129	32-423	519

=== Clean sheets ===
Player	Munster League	National League	Munster Ch.	All-Ireland Ch.	TOTAL
Nickie Quaid	1	4	1	1	7
Barry Hennessy	0	1	0	0	1
Totals	1	5	1	1	8
