= 2022 All-Ireland Senior Hurling Championship final =

- Event: 2022 All-Ireland Senior Hurling Championship
Kilkenny	Limerick
2–26	1–31
- Date: 17 July 2022
- Venue: Croke Park, Dublin
- Man of the Match: Gearóid Hegarty
- Referee: Colm Lyons (Cork)
- Weather: Dry, very warm with sunny spells 29 °C (84 °F)

The 2022 All-Ireland Senior Hurling Championship final was a hurling match played at Croke Park in Dublin on 17 July 2022 between Kilkenny and Limerick, the culmination of the 2022 All-Ireland Senior Hurling Championship. It was the 135th final of that sport's primary competition, the All-Ireland Senior Hurling Championship. This was the earliest in the year that the final had ever taken place. Some past finals had taken place at dates earlier in the year, but these were finals rescheduled from the years in which they were originally supposed to occur.

Reigning title holder Limerick won the game by 1–31 to 2–26 to claim their fourth title in five years and their first ever three-in-a-row. The game was the joint highest scoring final in history, equalling the total of 66 points scored in the 2021 final between Limerick and Cork, and had the most scores (60) in a final, surpassing the 58 scores of the 2021 final. Kilkenny's score of 2–26 was the highest total for a losing team in a final. There were 25 different scorers in the game, 10 for Limerick and 15 for Kilkenny.

The match was televised live on RTÉ One as part of The Sunday Game, presented by Joanne Cantwell from the Croke Park studio with analysis by Anthony Daly, Dónal Óg Cusack and Liam Sheedy. Commentary on the game was provided by Marty Morrissey alongside Michael Duignan. The match was also live on Sky Sports, with analysis from Jamesie O'Connor, Ollie Canning and J. J. Delaney.

Audience share for television coverage of the game in Ireland was 72%.

== Background ==
- This was the first meeting of Kilkenny and Limerick in the final since 2007. They had met in nine previous finals, Kilkenny winning five (1911, 1933, 1935, 1974, 2007) and Limerick four (1897, 1936, 1940, 1973).
- Kilkenny had not won an All-Ireland since 2015; this final marked their seventh season in a row without a title, their worst streak since 1984–1991 (eight years in a row).

== Paths to the final ==
=== Kilkenny ===
16 April 2022 Leinster round-robin	Westmeath	1–19 (22) – 5–23 (38)	Kilkenny	Mullingar
				Venue: TEG Cusack Park
	Gls: O McCabe 1. Pts: K Doyle 14 (11f), J Boyle 2, N O’Brien 1, D Glennon 1, D Egerton 1.	Report	Gls: TJ Reid 1, W Walsh 1, B Ryan 1, J Maher 1, M Carey 1. Pts: A Murphy 7 (6f), TJ Reid 4 (1 ‘65’, 2f), P Walsh 4, W Walsh 2, A Mullen 2, B Ryan 1, J Maher 1, C Kenny 1, E Cody 1	Referee: R McGann (Clare)

23 April 2022 Leinster round-robin	Kilkenny	2–34 (40) – 1–14 (17)	Laois	Kilkenny
				Venue: Nowlan Park
	Gls: E Cody 1, T Phelan 1. Pts: TJ Reid 10 (7f), A Mullen 6, E Cody 5, W Walsh 4, P Walsh 4 J Donnelly 2, J Maher 2, T Phelan 1.	Report	Gls: P Purcell 1. Pts: PJ Scully 4 (4f), P Purcell 2 (1f), C Dwyer 3, J Keyes 1, A Corby 1, C McEvoy 1, R Mullaney 1, C Byrne 1.	Referee: L Gordon (Galway)

1 May 2022 Leinster round-robin	Galway	1–24 (27) – 3–17 (26)	Kilkenny	Galway
		(HT: 1–17 – 2–8)		Venue: Pearse Stadium
	Gls: J Coen 1. Pts: C Cooney 6 (fs), B Concannon 4, J Cooney 4, T Monaghan 3, C Mannion 2, F Burke 2 (two line cuts), P Mannion 1, David Burke 1, C Fahy 1.	Report	Gls: E Cody 1, B Ryan 1, J Donnelly 1. Pts: A Murphy 5 (4fs), W Walsh 3, TJ Reid 3 (2fs), E Cody 2, P Walsh 2, M Carey 1, A Mullen 1.	Referee: C Lyons (Cork); Attendance: 14,034; TV: RTÉ2

14 May 2022 Leinster round-robin	Dublin	0–17 (17) – 3–25 (34)	Kilkenny	Dublin
		(HT: 0–11 – 1–11)		Venue: Parnell Park
	Pts: D Burke 9 (7f), C Burke 2, E Dillon 1, F Whitely 1, C Crummey 1, D Gray 1, R McBride 1, M Schutte 1.	Report	Gls: M Keoghan 2, TJ Reid 1. Pts: TJ Reid 7 (5f), A Mullen 5, C Kenny 4, A Murphy 3, E Cody 2, B Ryan 1, J Donnelly 1, C Buckley 1, M Keoghan 1.	Referee: T Walsh (Waterford); Attendance: 8,750; TV: Sky Sports

21 May 2022 Leinster round-robin	Kilkenny	1–18 (21) – 1–22 (25)	Wexford	Kilkenny
		(HT: 1–8 – 1–11)		Venue: Nowlan Park
	Gls: M Keoghan 1. Pts: TJ Reid 10 (8f, 1 65); M Carey 2, A Mullen 2; M Keoghan 1; W Walsh 1, B Ryan 1 (l/b), P Walsh 1.	Report	Gls: O Foley 1 Pts: L Chin 0-9 (7fs); D O’Keeffe 2, R O’Connor 2, S Donohoe 2; C McDonald 1, L Og McGovern 1, J O’Connor 1, L Ryan 1, M Dwyer 1, C Flood 1, C Dunbar 1.	Referee: F Horgan (Tipperary); Attendance: 13,565; TV: Sky Sports

Kilkenny finished second in the Leinster round-robin and so advanced to the Leinster Final.

4 June 2022 Leinster Final	Galway	0–17 (17) – 0–22 (22)	Kilkenny	Dublin
19:00		(HT: 0–9 – 0–11)		Venue: Croke Park
	Pts: C Cooney 9 (5f, 2 65, 1 sideline), C Whelan 4, C Fahy 2, F Burke 1, P Mannion 1 (f).	Report	Pts: TJ Reid 12 (11f, 1 65), A Mullen 4, P Deegan 2, B Ryan 1, M Keoghan 1, P Walsh 1.	Referee: J Owens (Wexford); TV: RTÉ2

As Leinster champions, Kilkenny advanced to the All-Ireland semi-final.

2 July 2022 All-Ireland Semi-Final	Kilkenny	2–26 (32) – 0–20 (20)	Clare	Dublin
		(HT: 1–17 (20) – 0–6 (6))		Venue: Croke Park
	Gls: Cian Kenny 1, Martin Keoghan 1 Pts: TJ Reid 10 (7f), Adrian Mullen 5, Cian Kenny 2, Eoin Cody 3, Pádraig Walsh 2, Billy Ryan 2, Conor Browne 1, Walter Walsh 1	Report	Pts: Shane O’Donnell 4, Tony Kelly 4 (3f, 1 ’65), Diarmuid Ryan 3, David Fitzgerald 3, Mark Rodgers 2, David McInerney 1, Peter Duggan 1 (1f), Ryan Taylor 1, Rory Hayes 1 each	Referee: Fergal Horgan (Tipperary); Attendance: 39,626; TV: RTÉ and Sky Sports

=== Limerick ===
17 April 2022 Munster round-robin	Cork	1–17 (20) – 2–25 (31)	Limerick	Cork
16:00		(HT: 1–8 – 2–9)		Venue: Páirc Uí Chaoimh
	Gls: S Kingston 1 Pts: P Horgan 9 (8f), R O'Flynn 2, S Barrett 2, C Lehane 2, D Fitzgibbon, T O'Mahony 1	Report	Gls: K Hayes 1, A Gillane 1 Pts: D Byrnes 6 (4f), A Gillane 4 (2f), G Hegarty 3, C Lynch 2, B Nash 2, C O'Neill 2, T Morrissey 1, D Morrissey 1, D Hannon 1, P Ryan 1, D Reidy 1	Referee: J Keenan (Wicklow); Attendance: 40,000; TV: RTÉ2

23 April 2022 Munster round-robin	Limerick	0–30 (30) – 2–21 (27)	Waterford	Limerick
19:00		(HT: 0–14 – 0–13)		Venue: TUS Gaelic Grounds
	Pts: A Gillane 13 (7 fs); D Byrnes 6 (5fs); C O’Neill 3, G Hegarty 2, D O’Donovan 2, T Morrissey 2; P Ryan 1, D Reidy 1.	Report	Gls: Stephen Bennett 1, J Prendergast 1. Pts: Stephen Bennett 7 (6 fs, 1 65); A Gleeson 5 (3fs, 1 sl); D Hutchison 5; C Lyons 3, P Curran 1.	Referee: S Stack (Dublin); Attendance: 27,488; TV: Sky Sports

8 May 2022 Munster round-robin	Limerick	3–21 (30) – 0–23 (23)	Tipperary	Limerick
14:00		(HT: 1–9 – 0–14)		Venue: TUS Gaelic Grounds
	Gls: A Gillane 2, C Boylan 1. Pts: A Gillane 5 (4f), D Byrnes 3 (2f), T Morrissey 3, D O’Donovan 2, C O’Neill 2, B Nash 1, D Hannon 1, G Hegarty 1, G Mulcahy 1, S Flanagan 1, D Reidy 1.	Report	Pts: N McGrath 13 (9f, 2 ’65, 1 sideline), G Browne 3, J Morris 3, B Heffernan 1, A Flynn 1, M Kehoe 1, R Byrne 1.	Referee: L Gordon (Galway); Attendance: 27,111

15 May 2022 Munster round-robin	Clare	0–24 (24) – 1–21 (24)	Limerick	Ennis
16:00		(HT: 0–15 – 1–12)		Venue: Cusack Park
	Pts: T Kelly 16 (10 frees, 1 '65), D Fitzgerald 2, D Ryan 2, R Taylor 2, D McInerney 1, S Meehan 1.	Report	Gls: K Hayes 1 Pts: D Byrnes 9 (7fs, 1 '65), G Hegarty 4, D Reidy 4 (fs), S Flanagan 1, T Morrissey 1, O O'Reilly 1, D O'Donovan 1.	Referee: C Lyons (Cork); Attendance: 18,129; TV: RTÉ2

Limerick finished second in the Munster round-robin and so advanced to the Munster Final.

5 June 2022 Munster Final	Clare	0–29 – 1–29 (a.e.t.)	Limerick	Thurles
16:00		(HT: 0–14 – 1–11) (FT: 0–24 – 1–21)		Venue: Semple Stadium
	Pts: T Kelly 13 (5f, 1 sideline), D Fitzgerald 5, P Duggan 4 (3f, 1 sideline), R Taylor 3, M Rodgers 2 (1f), I Galvin 1, S Meehan 1.	Report	Gls: G Hegarty 1. Pts: A Gillane 10 (7f), S Flanagan 8, T Morrissey 3, C O’Neill 2, D Byrnes 1 (f), D Hannon 1, D O’Donovan 1, C Boylan 1, D Reidy 1, W O'Donoghue 1.	Referee: J Keenan (Wicklow); Attendance: 45,690; TV: RTÉ2

As Munster champions, Limerick advanced to the All-Ireland semi-final.

3 July 2022 All-Ireland Semi-Final	Limerick	0–27 (27) – 1–21 (24)	Galway	Dublin
		(HT: 0–16 – 0–12)		Venue: Croke Park
	Pts: Aaron Gillane 8 (2f), Diarmaid Byrnes 6 (6f), Kyle Hayes 3, David Reidy 3, Séamus Flanagan 2, Barry Nash 1, Declan Hannon 1, William O’Donoghue 1, Tom Morrissey 1, Gearóid Hegarty 1	Report	Gls: Brian Concannon 1 Pts: Conor Cooney 5 (4f), Cathal Mannion 4, Tom Monaghan 4, Conor Whelan 2, Padraic Mannion 2 (1f), Ronan Glennon 2, Fintan Burke 1, Joseph Cooney 1	Referee: Thomas Walsh (Waterford); Attendance: 52,215; TV: RTÉ and Sky Sports

== Pre-match ==
=== Officials ===
On 6 July, the GAA named Cork's Colm Lyons as the referee for the final; he was the first Cork referee in the final since Diarmuid Kirwan in 2009.

=== Pageantry ===
President Michael D. Higgins greeted the players along with the GAA President for the first time since the 2019 All-Ireland final due to the COVID-19 pandemic and the pre-match parade featuring the Artane Band made a return for a second year running. The Liam MacCarthy Cup was brought out onto the pitch by two Ukrainian children who had fled their country due to the ongoing Russian invasion of Ukraine.

=== Build-up ===
The final was shown on a giant screen at the Gaelic Grounds in Limerick where an all ticket crowd watched the match.

=== Jubilee teams ===
The Wexford team that won the 1996 All-Ireland Final along with the Clare teams that won the 1995 and 1997 All-Ireland Final's were presented to the crowd before the match. The first time teams were presented on the pitch since the 2019 All-Ireland Final.

== Match ==
=== Summary ===
In dry and very warm conditions of 29 °C (84 °F) due to a heat wave, Diarmaid Byrnes opened the scoring in the first minute. In front of a crowd of over 80,000 for the first time since the 2019 All-Ireland final due to the COVID-19 pandemic, Gearóid Hegarty got the opening goal of the game after four minutes with a strike to the left corner of the net from out on the right to make it 1-1 to no score. Limerick were ahead by four points at half-time on a 1-17 to 0-16 scoreline. In the second half, goals from Billy Ryan with a low shot to the corner of the net and Martin Keoghan with a shot into the left corner form the right twice helped to briefly drag Kilkenny back on level terms, and every one of their subs scored – Richie Hogan hitting an equaliser in his first appearance of the season. In the end, Limerick won the game 1-31 to 2-26 to claim their fourth title in five years and their first ever three-in-a-row. Captain Declan Hannon lifted the Liam MacCarthy Cup alongside the injured Cian Lynch, whose absence with an ankle injury made the achievement all the more impressive.

=== Details ===
RTÉ
Sky Sports

17 July 2022
15:30
All-Ireland Final

Report

Kilkenny	2-26 (32) – (34) 1-31	Limerick
(HT: 0-16 (16) – (20) 1-17)
Gls: Martin Keoghan 1, Billy Ryan 1 Pts: TJ Reid 9 (9f), Martin Keoghan 1, Adrian Mullen 3, Paddy Deegan 2, Padraig Walsh 2, Eoin Cody 1, Tommy Walsh 1, Mikey Carey 1, Richie Reid 1, David Blanchfield 1, Alan Murphy 1, Walter Walsh 1, John Donnelly 1, Richie Hogan 1		Gls: Gearoid Hegarty 1 Pts: Gearoid Hegarty 5, Aaron Gillane 6 (4f), Diarmaid Byrnes 5 (3f, 1 '65), Kyle Hayes 4, Tom Morrissey 4, Séamus Flanagan 2, Declan Hannon 1, Dan Morrissey 1, Conor Boylan 1, Cathal O'Neill 1

Croke Park, Dublin
Referee: Colm Lyons (Cork)

Kilkenny	Limerick

GK	1	Eoin Murphy
B	2	Mikey Butler
B	3	Huw Lawlor
B	4	Tommy Walsh	(substituted off) 47'
HB	5	Michael Carey
HB	6	Richie Reid (captain)
HB	7	Paddy Deegan	(substituted off) 71'
MF	8	Cian Kenny	(substituted off) 35'
MF	9	Conor Browne	(substituted off) 17' (substituted on) 24' (substituted off) 53'
FW	10	T. J. Reid
FW	11	Padraig Walsh
FW	12	Billy Ryan
FW	13	Adrian Mullen
FW	14	Martin Keoghan
FW	15	Eoin Cody	(substituted off) 59'
Substitutes:
	20	Conor Fogarty	(substituted on) 17' (substituted off) 24'
	23	Walter Walsh	(substituted on) 35'
	24	John Donnelly	(substituted on) 47'
	18	David Blanchfield	(substituted on) 53'
	25	Richie Hogan	(substituted on) 59'
	22	Alan Murphy	(substituted on) 71'
Manager:
Brian Cody

GK	1	Nickie Quaid
B	2	Seán Finn
B	3	Mike Casey
B	4	Barry Nash
HB	5	Diarmaid Byrnes
HB	6	Declan Hannon (captain)
HB	7	Dan Morrissey
MF	8	William O'Donoghue
MF	9	Darragh O'Donovan	(substituted off) 52'
FW	10	Gearóid Hegarty
FW	11	Kyle Hayes
FW	12	Tom Morrissey	(substituted off) 64'
FW	13	Aaron Gillane
FW	14	Séamus Flanagan	(substituted off) 60'
FW	15	Graeme Mulcahy	(substituted off) 48'
Substitutes:
	18	Peter Casey	(substituted on) 48'
	26	David Reidy	(substituted on) 52'
	17	Conor Boylan	(substituted on) 60'
	24	Cathal O'Neill	(substituted on) 64'
Manager:
John Kiely

=== Trophy presentation ===
Limerick captain Declan Hannon, alongside Cian Lynch (who did not play in the final due to an injury), accepted the Liam MacCarthy Cup from GAA president Larry McCarthy in the Hogan Stand. In doing so, Hannon became the first captain to lift the Liam MacCarthy Cup four times.

Lynch later revealed that he was not anticipating Hannon asking him to lift the trophy with him.

=== Reaction ===
Limerick captain Declan Hannon speaking to RTÉ after the match said "It means everything to us".

Limerick manager John Kiely spoke to RTÉ after the match about how much it meant to make history with Limerick and how the panel almost governed itself in setting standards.

Kyle Hayes dedicated Limerick's third All-Ireland SHC title in a row to Cian Lynch, "the heart and soul of our team". Speaking to RTÉ Sport, Hayes said: "Anyone who knows Ciano personally, he's an absolute gentleman."

Kilkenny manager Brian Cody speaking to RTÉ after the match said "It was close for sure at the end. I think every Kilkenny person should be very, very proud of how the Kilkenny team performed."

Highlights of the final were shown on The Sunday Game programme which aired at 9:30pm that night on RTÉ2 and was presented by Des Cahill with match analysis from Jackie Tyrrell, Brendan Cummins, Donal Óg Cusack, Davy Fitzgerald, Shane Dowling and Ursula Jacob. On the man of the match award shortlist were Gearóid Hegarty, Kyle Hayes and Diarmaid Byrnes with Gearóid Hegarty winning the award which was presented by GAA president Larry McCarthy at the post match Limerick function at the Clayton Burlington Hotel in Dublin.

=== Celebrations ===
The Limerick team returned home the day after the final where the homecoming event was held at Gaelic Grounds, with the team arriving around 7pm. Shortly after 5pm, an estimated 40,000 people turned out to see the team and fans lined a route on an open-top bus from Colbert Rail Station where the team arrived through Mallow Street, O'Connell Street, Sarsfield Bridge and out to the Ennis Road to the Gaelic Grounds which was packed by 45,000. Entertainment and a concert celebration commenced at 5pm at the Gaelic Grounds in which Denise Chaila, along with MuRli and God Knows, performing together as Narolane, led a stellar line-up of music acts including Emma Langford and Moncrieff.

Limerick manager Kiely revealed that Kyle Hayes and David Reidy were fitness doubts until one hour before the game. Aaron Gillane later revealed that rumours circulating about his fitness were partially true after injuring his knee while clearing a soccer ball out of the way of a frisbee.

== Matchday programme controversy ==
The GAA issued an apology after forgetting to include Clare in the matchday programme's "roll of honour section".
