= Timmy Ryan =

Limerick hurler

Personal information
- Native name: Tadhg Ó Riain (Irish)
- Nickname: Goodboy
- Born: 7 May 1909 Castleconnell, County Limerick, Ireland
- Died: 28 January 1995 (aged 85) Killoscully, County Tipperary, Ireland
- Height: 6 ft 0 in (183 cm)

Sport
- Sport: Hurling
- Position: Midfield
Club
- Years: Club
- 1928–1946: Ahane
Club titles
- Limerick titles: 13
Inter-county*
Years	County	Apps (scores)
1930–1946	Limerick	45
Inter-county titles
- Munster titles: 5
- All-Irelands: 3
- NHL: 5
- *Inter County team apps and scores correct as of 18:57, 24 April 2014.

Timothy Ryan (7 May 1909 – 28 January 1995) was an Irish hurler who played as a midfielder at senior level for the Limerick county team.

== Biographical overview ==
Born in Castleconnell, County Limerick, Ryan first arrived on the inter-county scene at the age of twenty, when he first linked up with the Limerick senior team. He made his senior debut in the 1930 championship. Ryan went on to win three All-Ireland medals, five Munster medals and five National Hurling League medals with Limerick. An All-Ireland runner-up on two occasions, Ryan also captained the team to the All-Ireland title in 1934.

Ryan represented the Munster inter-provincial team at various times throughout his career, winning five Railway Cup medals. At club level, he won thirteen championship medals with Ahane.

Throughout his inter-county career, Ryan made a then record of 45 championship appearances for Limerick. His retirement came following the conclusion of the 1946 championship.

In retirement from playing, Ryan became involved in team management and coaching. He was a selector and adviser with Ahane during their championship victory in 1955.

== Playing career ==
=== Club ===
Ryan was sixteen years-old when the Ahane club was formed in 1926. His first success came in 1928 when a 5–1 to 2–2 defeat of Kilmeedy gave him a junior championship medal.

In 1929, a 1–8 to 1–2 defeat of Cappamore gave Ryan an intermediate championship medal.

In 1931, he was a part of the Ahane team that reached the final of the senior championship. A 5–5 to 1–4 win over Croom gave Ahane their first senior title, while it also gave Ryan his first championship medal.

Ahane failed to retain their title, however, Ryan's team returned to the championship decider once again in 1933. A 1–7 to 1–1 defeat of Croom gave him his second championship medal. Back-to-back defeats of Kildimo in 1934 and 1935, followed by four successive defeats of Croom brought Ryan's championship medal tally to eight.

Eight-in-a-row proved beyond Ahane, as Croom triumphed in 1940 and again in 1941.

Ahane hurlers bounced back in 1942 to reach a tenth successive county decider. A 7–8 to 1–0 defeat of Rathkeale gave Ryan a ninth winners' medal in the hurling championship. Further defeats of Croom, Rathkeale (twice) and Granagh-Ballingarry yielded further championships in succession. These victories brought Ryan's championship medal tally to a remarkable thirteen.

=== Inter-county ===
==== Beginnings ====
Ryan joined the Limerick senior team in 1930.

Ryan lined out in his first Munster decider in 1933, as Limerick faced Waterford. With eight minutes left in the game, some spectators invaded the pitch and the match was abandoned. Since Limerick were winning by 3–7 to 1–2, the Munster Council declared them the champions and Ryan collected his first Munster medal. The subsequent All-Ireland final on 3 September 1933, saw a record crowd of 45,176 travel to Croke Park to see Limerick face Kilkenny. After being level at the interval, the game remained close in the second half until a solo-run goal by Johnny Dunne sealed a 1–7 to 0–6 victory for Kilkenny.

==== Dominance ====
A successful league campaign throughout 1933–34 saw Limerick reach the decider against Dublin. In spite of home advantage, Limerick had to battle hard for a 3–6 to 3–3 victory. It was Ryan's first league medal. The subsequent provincial championship saw Limerick reach the decider, where they played Waterford for the second year in-a-row. The result was much the same, with Ryan collecting a second Munster medal following a 4–8 to 2–5 victory. The All-Ireland final on 2 September 1934, was a special occasion as it was the golden jubilee final of the Gaelic Athletic Association. Dublin were the opponents and a close game developed. After leading by a point at the interval, Limerick went five clear with time running out. Dublin fought their way back to secure a remarkable draw. The replay on 30 September turned out to be an even closer affair, with both sides level with two minutes to go. Points from Mick Mackey and Jackie O'Connell and four goals from Dave Clohessy secured a 5–2 to 2–6 victory for Limerick. The win gave Ryan an All-Ireland medal, while he also had the honour of collecting the Liam MacCarthy Cup as captain.

Ryan added a second league medal to his collection as captain in 1935, as Limerick retained their title in a straightforward league format. Limerick dominated the provincial series of games once again, and lined out in the decider against Tipperary. He collected a third Munster medal following a 5–5 to 1–4 victory. Kilkenny were Limerick's opponents in the subsequent All-Ireland final on 1 September 1935, and, once again, the game was a close affair. Limerick were the red-hot favourites as a record crowd of over 46,000 turned up to watch the match. At the beginning of the second-half Lory Meagher scored a point from midfield giving Kilkenny a lead which they would not surrender. The game ended in controversial circumstances for Mackey when Limerick were awarded a close-in free to level the game. Jack Keane issued an instruction from the sideline that Ryan was to take the free and put the sliotar over the bar for the equalising point. As he lined up to take it, Mick Mackey pushed him aside and took the free himself. The shot dropped short and into the hands of the Kilkenny goalkeeper and was cleared. The game ended shortly after with Kilkenny triumphing by 2–5 to 2–4.

Limerick began 1936 by retaining their league title, having won seven of their games and drawing one. It was Ryan's third league medal. The team later embarked on a tour of the United States where they defeated a New York team made up of Irish expatriates. As a result of the tour Limerick were awarded a bye into the Munster final. Tipperary provided the opposition in the provincial final, however, a 5–3 haul from an injured Mick Mackey secured an 8–6 to 4–5 victory and a fourth successive Munster medal for Ryan. For the third time in four years the lure of a Kilkenny-Limerick clash brought a record crowd of over 50,000 to Croke Park for the All-Ireland decider on 6 September 1936. The first half produced a game that lived up to the previous clashes, and Limerick had a two-point advantage at half-time. Jackie Power scored two first-half goals, while a solo-run goal by Mackey in the second-half helped Limerick to a 5–6 to 1–5 victory. Ryan had won a second All-Ireland medal.

==== Final success and decline ====
In 1937, Ryan captured another league title, his fourth overall. Limerick's bid for a record-equalling fifth successive Munster crown came to an end in the provincial decider when Tipperary were victorious.

Limerick entered the record books in 1938 as the first team to win five consecutive National League titles. It is a record which has never been equalled. Ryan played a key role in all five of the victories.

A period of decline followed for Limerick, with many people believing that the team's best days were behind them. This certainly seemed the case in 1940, when it took two late goals from Jackie Power and a storming display by Mick Mackey to level the Munster semi-final with Waterford. Another late rally gave Limerick a victory in the subsequent replay. Ryan's side put in another excellent performance in the Munster final to draw the game with reigning provincial champions Cork. At half-time in the replay Limerick looked like a spent force. Held scoreless for the entire thirty minutes, Mackey got the recovery underway in the second-half with a point from a seventy. He later moved back to the defense, where Cork were running riot with goals. A pitch invasion scuppered the game for ten minutes, however, Limerick held on to win by 3–3 to 2–4 and Ryan collected a fifth Munster medal. The subsequent All-Ireland decider, on 1 September 1940, brought Kilkenny and Limerick together. Early in the second-half Kilkenny took a four-point lead, however, a positional switch at midfield proved vital. Limerick hung on to win the game on a score line of 3–7 to 1–7. The win gave Ryan his third All-Ireland medal.

Limerick took a back seat to Cork and Tipperary in the Munster series of games for the next few years.

In 1944, Limerick squared up to Cork in the provincial final as Cork were aiming for a fourth consecutive All-Ireland final victory. Ryan was a veteran hurler by now, however, he was still a key member of the Limerick team. In the game, Cork come back to draw the game on a 4–13 to 6–7 score line. In the last fifteen minutes of the subsequent replay, Limerick were up by four points when a goal by Mick Mackey was disallowed as he was deemed to be fouled as he went through. The subsequent free hit the outside of the post and dropped wide. Only seconds remained when Cork's Christy Ring caught the sliotar and fired a fierce shot into the net to win the game.

Following a defeat by Cork in the Munster decider in 1946, Ryan effectively retired from inter-county hurling.

=== Inter-provincial ===
Ryan also lined out with Munster in the inter-provincial series of games, and enjoyed much success during an eight-year career.

He was first included on the team in 1933, however, Leinster defeated Munster by 4–6 to 3–6 in the decider. Both sides renewed their rivalry the following year, with Ryan, who was now captain of the team, winning his first Railway Cup medal following a 6–3 to 3–2 victory. Munster made it two-in-a-row in 1935, with Ryan winning a second Railway Cup medal as captain.

After defeat in 1936, Munster bounced back in 1937. A 1–9 to 3–1 defeat of Leinster in the decider gave Ryan a third Railway Cup medal. It was the first of four successive final defeats of Leinster, with Ryan collecting further winners' medals in 1938 and 1939.

Ryan made his last appearance for Munster in 1941, however, it ended in defeat.

== Honours ==
=== Team ===
Ahane

- Limerick Senior Hurling Championship (13): 1931, 1933, 1934, 1935, 1936, 1937, 1938, 1939, 1942, 1943, 1944, 1945, 1946

Limerick

- All-Ireland Senior Hurling Championship (3): 1934 (c), 1936, 1940
- Munster Senior Hurling Championship (5): 1933, 1934 (c), 1935 (c), 1936, 1940
- National Hurling League (5): 1933–34, 1934–35 (c), 1935–36 (c), 1936–37, 1937–38

Munster

- Railway Cup (5): 1934 (c), 1935 (c), 1937, 1938, 1939

Sporting positions
Preceded by Micky Fitzgibbon	Limerick Senior Hurling Captain; 1934–1935	Succeeded by Mick Mackey
Achievements
Preceded by Eddie Doyle (Kilkenny)	All-Ireland SHC winning captain 1934	Succeeded by Lory Meagher (Kilkenny)
Preceded by Eddie Doyle (Leinster)	Railway Cup Hurling Final winning captain 1934–1935	Succeeded by Paddy Larkin (Leinster)
