= 2018 All-Ireland Senior Hurling Championship final =

- Event: 2018 All-Ireland Senior Hurling Championship
Galway	Limerick
2–18	3–16
- Date: 19 August 2018
- Venue: Croke Park, Dublin
- Man of the Match: Kyle Hayes
- Referee: James Owens (Wexford)
- Attendance: 82,300
- Weather: 22 °C, cloudy

The 2018 All-Ireland Senior Hurling Championship final was a hurling match played at Croke Park in Dublin on 19 August 2018 between Galway and Limerick, the culmination of the 2018 All-Ireland Senior Hurling Championship. It was the 131st final of that sport's primary competition, the All-Ireland Senior Hurling Championship.

Limerick won the match, ending a 45-year wait for a title.

The final was shown live in Ireland on RTÉ2 as part of The Sunday Game live programme, presented by Michael Lyster from Croke Park, with studio analysis from Liam Sheedy, Henry Shefflin and Ger Loughnane. Match commentary was provided by Marty Morrissey with analysis by Michael Duignan. The game was also shown live on Sky Sports, presented by Rachel Wyse and Brian Carney.

The match drew a peak audience of more than 1 million on RTÉ. The TV audience for The Sunday Game coverage peaked at 1,007,500 by the end of the final.

== Background ==
Galway were the defending champions and were looking to win their sixth All-Ireland title after winning in 1923, 1980, 1987, 1988, and 2017. Limerick were appearing in their first final since 2007 and were looking for an eighth title after winning in 1897, 1918, 1921, 1934, 1936, 1940, and 1973. The two counties had played each other in the final twice prior to this: in 1923 and 1980 with Galway winning both.

== Paths to the final ==
=== Limerick ===
==== Munster round-robin ====
20 May 2018 Round 1	Limerick	1-23 (26) – (20) 2-14	Tipperary	Limerick
14:00		(HT: 0-12 – 1-10)		Venue: Gaelic Grounds
	Gls: B Murphy 1 Pts: A Gillane 8 (6f), G Mulcahy 4, D Byrnes 3 (2 '65', 1f), C Lynch 2, G Hegarty 2, T Morrissey 2, D O'Donovan 1, S Flanagan 1	Report	Gls: D McCormack 1, J Forde 1 Pts: J Forde 9 (9f), N McGrath 2, J McGrath 2, J O'Dwyer 1	Referee: James McGrath (Westmeath); Attendance: 20,403; TV: RTÉ

2 June 2018 Round 2	Cork	1-25 (28) – (28) 0-28	Limerick	Cork
19:00		(HT: 0-14 – 0-12)		Venue: Páirc Uí Chaoimh
	Gls: P Horgan 1 Pts: P Horgan 11 (8f, 3 '65'), D Fitzgibbon 4, C Lehane 3, D Kearney 2, S Kingston 2, L Meade 1, M Coleman 1, C Spillane 1	Report	Pts: T Morrissey 8 (5f), S Flanagan 6, C Lynch 3, D O'Donovan 2, G Mulcahy 2, D Byrnes 2 (2f), K Hayes 2, G Hegarty 1, D Morrissey 1, A Gillane 1	Referee: James Owens (Wexford); Attendance: 34,607; TV: Sky Sports

10 June 2018 Round 3	Limerick	2-26 (32) – (19) 1-16	Waterford	Limerick
		(HT: 2-14 – 0-7)		Venue: Gaelic Grounds
	Gls: G Hegarty 1, G Mulcahy 1 Pts: S Dowling 15 (13f), C Lynch 3, T Morrissey 2, K Hayes 2, G Hegarty 1, S Flanagan 1, D O'Donovan 1, D Dempsey 1	Report	Gls: T Ryan 1 Pts: Pauric Mahony 10 (9f), DJ Foran 1, S Bennett 1, T Devine 1, M Shanahan 1, M Kearney 1, S O'Keeffe 1	Referee: Seán Cleere (Kilkenny); Attendance: 23,194

17 June 2018 Round 4	Clare	0-26 (26) – (15) 0-15	Limerick	Ennis
		(HT: 0-13 – 0-9)		Venue: Cusack Park
	Pts: P Duggan 13 (10f, 1 '65'), T Kelly 5 (1 '65'), J Conlon 4, D Fitzgerald 2, J Shanahan 1, C Galvin 1	Report	Pts: S Dowling 4 (4f), T Morrissey 3, K Hayes 1, D O'Donovan 1 (sl), C Lynch 1, D Byrnes 1, G Hegarty 1, D Morrissey 1, S Flanagan 1, A Gillane 1	Referee: James Owens (Westmeath); Attendance: 18,803; TV: RTÉ

Limerick finished third in the Munster Championship and so went into the All-Ireland preliminary quarter-finals.

==== All-Ireland series ====
7 July 2018 Preliminary quarter-final	Carlow	0-13 (13) – (37) 5-22	Limerick	Carlow
19:00		(HT: 0-4 – 3-9)		Venue: Dr Cullen Park
	Pts: D Murphy 4 (3f, 1 '65'), P Abbey 2, JM Nolan 2, J Kavanagh 1, D Byrne 1, E Byrne 1, C Nolan 1, S Murphy 1	Report	Gls: D Byrnes 1, K Hayes 1, A Gillane 1, G Mulcahy 1, P Casey 1 Pts: A Gillane 6 (2f), T Morrissey 5, P Casey 3, G Hegarty 2, D Byrnes 1 (1 '65'), C Lynch 1, S Flanagan 1, G Mulcahy 1, B Nash 1, D O'Donovan 1	Referee: John Keenan (Wicklow)

15 July 2018 Quarter-final	Kilkenny	1-22 (25) – (27) 0-27	Limerick	Thurles
14:00		(HT: 0-12 – 0-15)		Venue: Semple Stadium
	Gls: R Hogan 1 Pts: TJ Reid 7 (5f) (1 65), R Leahy 4, R Hogan 3, J Maher 3, C Fennelly 2, C Fogarty 1, L Blanchfield 1, J Donnolly 1	Report	Pts: A Gillane 5 (2f), T Morrissey 4, K Hayes 3, G Mulcahy 3, D O'Donnovan 3 (1 sl), G Hegarty 3, P Casey 2, S Flanagan 1, D Byrnes 1, D Hannon 1, S Dowling 1	Referee: J McGrath (Westmeath); Attendance: 18,596; TV: RTÉ

29 July 2018 Semi-final	Cork	2-31 (37) – (41) 3-32 (a.e.t.)	Limerick	Dublin
15:30		(HT: 0-14 – 1-12) (FT: 1-27 – 1-27)		Venue: Croke Park
	Gls: P Horgan 1 (1f), C Lehane 1 Pts: P Horgan 0-11 (9f), D Fitzgibbon 4, C Lehane 3, D Kearney 3, S Kingston 3, S Harnedy 2, M Coleman 2 (1 sideline), C Joyce 1, L Meade 1, J O'Connor 1		Gls: S Dowling 1 (1p), C Lynch 1, P Ryan 1 Pts: A Gillane 13 (7f), S Dowling 4 (1f), G Mulcahy 4, G Hegarty 3, C Lynch 1, D O'Donovan 1, D Byrnes 1(1f), S Flanagan 1, T Morrissey 1, K Hayes 1, B Nash 1, D Reidy 1	Referee: Paud O'Dwyer (Carlow); Attendance: 71,073; TV: RTÉ & Sky Sports

=== Galway ===
==== Leinster round-robin ====
12 May 2018 Round 1	Offaly	2-15 (21) – (33) 5-18	Galway	Tullamore
19:00		(HT: 1-7 – 2-9)		Venue: O'Connor Park
	Gls: S Dooley 1, J Bergin 1 Pts: S Dooley 9 (8f), D King 2, J Bergin 1, D Currams 1, E Cahill 1 (f), S Kinsella 1	Report	Gls: B Concannon 2, J Cooney 1, C Whelan 1, J Flynn 1 Pts: J Canning 8 (6f, 1 '65'), J Cooney 4, C Cooney 2, B Concannon 1, C Whelan 1, C Mannion 1, S Loftus 1	Referee: Johnny Murphy (Limerick); Attendance: 8,330

27 May 2018 Round 2	Galway	1-22 (25) – (17) 2-11	Kilkenny	Salthill
16:00		(HT: 1-9 – 1-5)		Venue: Pearse Stadium
	Gls: J Canning 1 (pen); Pts: J Canning 12 (7f, 1 '65'), C Cooney 4, C Mannion 2, B Concannon 1, David Burke 1, J Flynn 1, N Burke 1	Report	Gls: TJ Reid 1 (pen), W Walsh 1 Pts: TJ Reid 9 (8f, 1 '65'), W Walsh 1, L Scanlon 1	Referee: Fergal Horgan (Tipperary); Attendance: 18,775; TV: RTÉ

2 June 2018 Round 3	Wexford	0-17 (17) – (26) 1-23	Galway	Wexford
17:00		(HT: 0-9 – 1-12)		Venue: Wexford Park
	Pts: R O'Connor 12 (10f), A Nolan 2, P Morris 2, P Foley 1	Report	Gls: C Whelan 1 Pts: J Canning 12 (8f, 2 sl), C Cooney 4, D Burke 2, C Whelan 2, J Cooney 1, J Flynn 1 (1f), N Burke 1	Referee: Johnny Murphy (Limerick); Attendance: 14,500; TV: Sky Sports

9 June 2018 Round 4	Galway	0-26 (26) – (25) 2-19	Dublin	Salthill
19:00		(HT: 0-16 – 0-9)		Venue: Pearse Stadium
	Pts: J Flynn 11 (9f), J Cooney 3, C Whelan 3, P Mannion 3, C Cooney 2, David Burke 2, S Loftus 1, C Mannion 1	Report	Gls: P Winter 2 Pts: D Treacy 4 (3f), R McBride 4 (1 sl), P Ryan 3 (3f), A Nolan 2 (2f), D Sutcliffe 1, J Malone 1, S Moran 1, J Madden 1, C Boland 1, P Winters 1	Referee: Diarmuid Kirwan (Cork); Attendance: 9,957

Galway finished first in the Leinster Championship and so went into the Leinster Final.

1 July 2018 Leinster Final	Galway	0-18 (18) – (18) 0-18	Kilkenny	Dublin
16:00		(HT: 0-7 – 0-8)		Venue: Croke Park
	Pts: J Canning 6, N Burke 4, C Whelan 3, C Mannion 3, C Cooney 1, J Cooney 1	Report	Pts: TJ Reid 10, B Ryan 2, E Murphy 1 (f), E Morrissey 1, J Maher 1, G Aylward 1, J Donnelly 1, W Walsh 1	Referee: Fergal Horgan (Tipperary); Attendance: 40,703; TV: RTÉ

8 July 2018 Leinster Final Replay	Galway	1-28 (31) – (24) 3-15	Kilkenny	Thurles
15:00		(HT: 1-16 – 1-7)		Venue: Semple Stadium
	Gls: J Glynn 1 Pts: J Canning 10 (6f), C Mannion 6, C Whelan 4, N Burke 2, A Harte 2, J Cooney 1, J Glynn 1, C Cooney 1, J Flynn 1	Report	Gls: G Aylward 1, R Hogan 1, C Fennelly 1 Pts: TJ Reid 9 (6f, 1 '65'), J Holden 1, C Fogarty 1, J Maher 1, J Donnelly 1, R Hogan 1, C Fennelly 1	Referee: James Owens (Wexford); Attendance: 25,102; TV: RTÉ

Galway won the Leinster Championship and so advanced to the All-Ireland semi-final.

==== All-Ireland series ====
28 July 2018 Semi-final	Galway	1-30 (33) – (33) 1-30 (a.e.t.)	Clare	Dublin
17:00		(HT: 1-10 – 0-9) (FT: 1-23 – 0-26)		Venue: Croke Park
	Gls: C Cooney 1 Pts: J Canning 12 (6f, 2 sl), C Mannion 4, David Burke 3, C Whelan 3, J Flynn 3 (1f), J Coen 2, C Cooney 1, J Glynn 1, N Burke 1	Report	Gls: A Shanagher 1 Pts: P Duggan 14 (11f), J Conlon 4, S O'Donnell 3, T Kelly 3 (1 sl), I Galvin 2, D Fitzgerald 1, D Reidy 1, J McCarthy 1, C Galvin 1	Referee: James Owens (Wexford); Attendance: 54,191; TV: RTÉ; Sky Sports

5 August 2018 Semi-final Replay	Clare	2-13 (19) – (20) 1-17	Galway	Thurles
14:00		(HT: 0-6 – 1-9)		Venue: Semple Stadium
	Gls: P Duggan 1, S O'Donnell 1 Pts: P Duggan 6 (6f), I Galvin 2, T Kelly, P Collins 1, J Conlon 1, A Shanagher 1, S O'Donnell 1	Report	Gls: J Glynn 1 Pts: J Canning 8 (4f, 1 sl), C Whelan 3, N Burke 2, D Burke 2, C Mannion 1, C Cooney 1	Referee: Fergal Horgan (Tipperary); Attendance: 44,246; TV: RTÉ; Sky Sports

== Pre-match ==
=== Build-up ===
The final was shown on a giant screen at the Gaelic Grounds in Limerick where an all ticket crowd of 20,000 watched the match. A big screen was also in place in Eyre Square in Galway for the match.

=== Hurling stars of the 1990s ===
The Kilkenny team that won the 1992 All-Ireland Final were honoured in 2017 and as Kilkenny also won the 1993 All-Ireland Final the GAA decided instead to honour the star hurlers of the 1990s. A group of senior GAA correspondents under the chairmanship of GAA President John Horan selected the team. The team was presented to the crowd after the completion of the minor final.

1. Damien Fitzhenry (Wexford – Duffry Rovers)
2. Brian Corcoran (Cork – Erin's Own, Glounthaune)
3. Brian Lohan (Clare – Wolfe Tones na Sionna)
4. Martin Hanamy (Offaly – St. Rynagh's)
5. Brian Whelahan (Offaly – Birr)
6. Seánie McMahon (Clare – St Josephs Doora-Barefield)
7. Liam Dunne (Wexford – Oulart the Ballagh)
8. Ciarán Carey (Limerick – Patrickswell)
9. Michael Coleman (Galway – Abbeyknockmoy)
10. Martin Storey (Wexford – Oulart the Ballagh)
11. Gary Kirby (Limerick – Patrickswell)
12. Jamesie O'Connor (Clare – St Josephs Doora-Barefield)
13. Michael Cleary (Tipperary – Nenagh Éire Óg)
14. D. J. Carey (Kilkenny – Young Irelands, Gowran)
15. Johnny Dooley (Offaly – Seir Kieran)

=== Ticketing ===
With a stadium capacity of 82,300, the 32 individual county boards received 60,000 tickets. Schools and third level colleges got 2,500 tickets, while season ticket holders were entitled to 5,500 tickets. 1,000 tickets were given to overseas clubs. The Camogie, Ladies' Football, Handball and Rounders Associations were each allocated about 200 tickets, as were the jubilee teams and mini-7s which play at half-time. Demand for tickets was very high in both counties with Galway and Limerick having receiving around 32,000 tickets between. Stand tickets were priced at €80 with terrace at €40.

=== Related events ===
The 2018 All-Ireland Minor Hurling Final was played between Galway and Kilkenny as a curtain-raiser to the senior final with Galway retaining their title by winning 0–21 to 0–14.

== Match summary ==
=== Officials ===
On 7 August 2018 the officials were chosen for the final by the GAA, with Wexford's James Owens being named as the referee in what was his second senior final after being the referee in 2015. Tipperary's Fergal Horgan was the standby referee with Kilkenny's Sean Cleere the linesman and Carlow's Patrick Murphy the sideline official.

=== Team news ===
The Limerick team announced for the final was unchanged from the semi-final win over Cork. Galway made one change to the starting team with Gearóid McInerney recovering from a calf injury he picked up in the drawn game against Clare and coming in to replace Niall Burke.

=== Summary ===
Playing into the Davin end, Aaron Gillane opened the scoring for Limerick after 2 minutes. Joe Canning opened Galway's account with a 65 after 7 minutes to make the score 3 points to 1. Canning got another point in the 15th minute to level the score at 5 points each. In the 16th minute Graeme Mulcahy scrambled the ball over the line on the ground from close range after dropping it for the opening goal to put Limerick into a 2-point lead. A Séamus Flanagan point in the last minute of the first half made the score 1–10 to 0–9 at half-time.

Four minutes into the second-half Kyle Hayes got the opening score to increase the lead to 4 points. Kyle Hayes got the decision from Hawk-Eye with another point a minute later to increase the lead to 6 points. After 54 minutes, Limerick got their second goal when Tom Morrissey pounced on a mistake from Gearoid McInerney to run in on goal and finish low and powerful to the net off the Hurley from the middle of the goal to put 9 points between the sides. In the 68th minute, substitute Shane Dowling got another goal for Limerick when he picked the ball up and finished with a low shot to the right of the net from the left to increase the lead to 8 points.

In the first of the 8 minutes of added time Galway scored a goal when Conor Whelan shot powerfully to the right of the net, four minutes later Joe Canning got another goal with a powerful shot to the top left corner of the net from a free to put 2 points between the sides. A minute later Niall Burke scored a point to put only one point between the sides. Graeme Mulcahy then scored a point for Limerick with a shot from the right to put 2 between them again before Joe Canning scored with a 65 to again make it a one-point game. In the last minute of time added on, Galway were awarded a free form inside their own half on the right, Joe Canning took the free which dropped short and was eventually cleared before the final sounded with Limerick the winners by one point.

== Match details ==
RTÉ & Sky Sports

19 August 2018
15:30
All-Ireland Final

Report

Galway	2-18 (24) – (25) 3-16	Limerick
(HT: 0-9 – 1-10)
Gls: C Whelan 1, J Canning 1 (1f); Pts: J Canning 10 (5f, 2 '65'), D Burke 3, J Cooney 3, P Mannion 1, N Burke 1		Gls: G Mulcahy 1, T Morrissey 1, S Dowling 1 Pts: K Hayes 4, A Gillane 3 (1f), G Mulcahy 2, D Hannon 2, T Morrisey 1, D O'Donovan 1, C Lynch 1, D Byrnes 1, S Flanagan 1

Croke Park, Dublin
Referee: James Owens (Wexford)
Attendance: 82,300

Galway	Limerick

GALWAY:
1	James Skehill
2	Adrian Tuohy
3	Daithí Burke
4	John Hanbury
5	Pádraic Mannion
6	Gearóid McInerney
7	Aidan Harte
8	Johnny Coen
9	David Burke (c)
10	Joseph Cooney
11	Joe Canning
12	Jonathan Glynn
13	Conor Whelan
14	Conor Cooney
15	Cathal Mannion
Substitutes:
22	Niall Burke for Cathal Mannion (45 mins)
17	Paul Killeen for John Hanbury (57 mins)
25	Jason Flynn for Conor Cooney (59 mins)
18	Seán Loftus for Johnny Coen (60 mins)
16	Fearghal Flannery for James Skehill (61 mins)
Manager:
Micheál Donoghue

LIMERICK:
1	Nicky Quaid
2	Seán Finn
3	Mike Casey
4	Richie English
5	Diarmaid Byrnes
6	Declan Hannon (c)
7	Dan Morrissey
8	Darragh O'Donovan
9	Cian Lynch
10	Gearóid Hegarty
11	Kyle Hayes
12	Tom Morrissey
13	Aaron Gillane
14	Séamus Flanagan
15	Graeme Mulcahy
Substitutes:
22	Richie McCarthy for Mike Casey (50 mins)
19	Shane Dowling for Gearóid Hegarty (56 mins)
17	Peter Casey for Séamus Flanagan (64 mins)
24	William O'Donoghue for Darragh O’Donovan (67 mins)
18	Tom Condon for Richie English (72 mins)
Manager:
John Kiely

=== Trophy presentation ===
Limerick captain Declan Hannon accepted the Liam MacCarthy Cup from GAA president John Horan in the Hogan Stand.

=== Reaction ===
Speaking after the final whistle, Limerick manager John Kiely was happy that Limerick had held on in the final few minutes saying "It's huge, huge, huge relief, this group has phenomenal belief in its own abilities, its own resolve, that never-say-die attitude. We have worked so, so hard. Galway pushed us so hard in the last 10, 15 minutes. It was really difficult on the lads to hold their nerve to try and find those last few vital scores, but they did."

Galway manager Micheál Donoghue accepted that his side were 'a tad off' in the final but vowed that they will be back again next year saying "We're bitterly disappointed. I just felt we probably didn't get into the game but you have to give huge credit to Limerick. They started really well and were dominant for long periods."

Highlights of the final were shown on The Sunday Game programme which aired at 9:30pm that night on RTÉ2 and was presented by Des Cahill with match analysis from Brendan Cummins, Eddie Brennan, and Anthony Daly. On the man of the match award shortlist were Kyle Hayes, Declan Hannon and Joe Canning with Kyle Hayes winning the award which was presented by GAA president John Horan at the City West hotel in Dublin where the post match Limerick function was being held.

=== Celebrations ===
The Limerick team returned home the day after the final where the homecoming event was held at Gaelic Grounds, with the team arriving around 7:00pm, the MC was Marty Morrissey. An estimated 90,000 people turned out to see the team and fans lined a route from Colbert Rail Station where the team arrived at 5.40pm through Mallow Street, O'Connell Street, Sarsfield Bridge and out to the Ennis Road to the Gaelic Grounds which was packed by 45,000.
