= Mark van Drumpt =

Dutch physiotherapist (died 2021)

Mark van Drumpt (died 18 February 2021) served as lead physiotherapist for the Limerick county hurling team during its 2018 and 2020 All-Ireland Senior Hurling Championship winning campaigns. He was also involved in a similar capacity with the rugby union team Garryowen Football Club.

Van Drumpt practised at Dooradoyle Physiotherapy Clinic and was a registered member of the Irish Society of Chartered Physiotherapists.

Van Drumpt was involved with Limerick GAA teams for more than a decade and a half. He worked with county minor and under-21 hurling teams that won two All-Ireland Under-21 Hurling Championships, three Munster Under-21 Hurling Championships, four Munster Minor Hurling Championships and made two All-Ireland Minor Hurling Championship final appearances, and was also lead physiotherapist with the Limerick county football team when that team advanced to three finals of the Munster Senior Football Championship and two finals of the National Football League.

Van Drumpt was originally from the city of Arnhem in the eastern Netherlands. A resident of Ballina, County Tipperary, he was married with one daughter at the time of his death. A son with ornithine transcarbamylase deficiency predeceased him during surgery at the Hôpital des Enfants-Malades in Paris in March 2003, with Van Drumpt having donated the left lobe of his liver in a bid to keep him alive.

Van Drumpt died after eight years with cancer on 18 February 2021. Gearóid Hegarty, who shortly afterwards was named All Stars Hurler of the Year, dedicated his award to Van Drumpt when he received it on RTÉ Television.
