= 1936 All-Ireland Senior Hurling Championship final =

1936 All-Ireland Senior Hurling Final
- Event: 1936 All-Ireland Senior Hurling Championship
Limerick	Kilkenny
5-6	1-5
- Date: 6 September 1936
- Venue: Croke Park, Dublin
- Referee: Jim O'Regan (Cork)
- Attendance: 51,235

The 1936 All-Ireland Senior Hurling Championship Final was the 49th All-Ireland Final and the culmination of the 1936 All-Ireland Senior Hurling Championship, an inter-county hurling tournament for the top teams in Ireland. The match was held at Croke Park, Dublin, on 6 September 1936, between Limerick and Kilkenny. The Leinster champions lost to their Munster opponents on a score line of 5–6 to 1–5.

== Match details ==
1936-09-06
15:15 UTC+1

Limerick	5-6 – 1-5	Kilkenny

Croke Park, Dublin
Attendance: 51,235
Referee: J. O'Regan (Cork)
