= Liam O'Donoghue =

Irish hurler (born 1952)

Personal information
- Native name: Liam Ó Donnchú (Irish)
- Born: 21 July 1952 (age 74) Mungret, County Limerick, Ireland
- Occupation: Sales rep
- Height: 5 ft 8 in (173 cm)

Sport
- Sport: Hurling
- Position: Half-forward
Club
- Years: Club
- 1970s-1980s: Mungret/St. Paul's
Club titles
- Limerick titles: 0
Inter-county
Years	County	Apps (scores)
1973-1988	Limerick	37 (2-26)
Inter-county titles
- Munster titles: 4
- All-Irelands: 1
- NHL: 2
- All Stars: 1

Liam O'Donoghue (born 21 July 1952 in Mungret, County Limerick, Ireland) is an Irish retired sportsperson. He played hurling with his local club Mungret/St. Paul's and was a member of the Limerick senior inter-county team in the 1970s and 1980s.
