= Kyle Hayes =

Irish hurler (born 1998)

Personal information
- Native name: Mac Shile Ó hAodha (Irish)
- Born: 15 July 1998 (age 28) Kildimo, County Limerick, Ireland
- Height: 6 ft 5 in (196 cm)

Sport
- Sport: Hurling
- Position: Center back
Club*
Years	Club	Apps (scores)
	Kildimo-Pallaskenry	2 (0-06)
Club titles
- Limerick titles: 0
College
- Years: College
- 2016-2020: University of Limerick
College titles
- Fitzgibbon titles: 0
Inter-county**
Years	County	Apps (scores)
2017–present	Limerick	55 (7-55)
Inter-county titles
- Munster titles: 7
- All-Irelands: 6
- NHL: 4
- All Stars: 6
- * club appearances and scores correct as of 22:05, 8 October 2021. **Inter County team apps and scores correct as of 23:21, 30 October 2026.

Kyle Hayes (born 15 July 1998) is an Irish hurler who plays for Limerick Senior Championship club Kildimo-Pallaskenry and at inter-county level with the Limerick senior hurling team. He usually lines out as a left wing-back. To date he has won 6 All Stars, 7 Munster Senior Hurling titles, 4 National Hurling League titles, 6 All Ireland Senior Hurling Titles and PWC GPA/GAA young hurler of the year in 2018. He also was a part of the 2017 Munster & All Ireland Under-21 winning Limerick side.

== Club career ==
Hayes joined the Kildimo-Pallaskenry club at a young age and played in all grades at juvenile and underage levels before eventually joining the club's top adult teams as both a hurler and Gaelic footballer. He enjoyed his first success at adult level when, on 28 October 2017, he lined out at left wing-forward when the club's intermediate team faced Glenroe in the final of the Limerick Intermediate Championship. He was held scoreless over the hour but ended the game with a winners' medal after the 2–13 to 0–09 win.

On 21 October 2018, Hayes was selected amongst the substitutes when Kildimo-Pallaskenry faced Cappamore in the final of the Limerick Junior Football Championship. He was introduced as a half-time substitute and ended the game with a winners' medal after the 1–15 to 2–07 victory.

After being beaten by Blackrock in the 2019 PIHC final, Hayes lined out in a second successive final as team captain in 2020. Lining out at left corner-forward he scored three points in the 0–22 to 1–13 defeat of Mungret/St. Paul's. It was their first ever championship title in this grade.

== Inter-county career ==
=== Minor and under-21 ===
Hayes first played for Limerick when he was added to the minor panel shortly before the start of the 2015 Munster Minor Championship. He made his first appearance for the team on 8 April 2015 when he lined out at midfield in a ten-point defeat by Cork in the Munster quarter-final. Switched to the half-forward line as Limerick regrouped during the rest of the provincial campaign, Hayes was at right wing-forward when Limerick were beaten by three points by Tipperary in the Munster final. Eligible for the minor grade again the following year, he was selected at centre-forward when Limerick suffered a second successive defeat by Tipperary in the 2016 Munster final. On 4 September 2016, Hayes scored a point from full-forward when Limerick were beaten by 1–21 to 0–17 by Tipperary in the All-Ireland final.

After the end of his minor career, Hayes was immediately added to the Limerick under-21 panel for the 2017 Munster Under-21 Championship. After making his first appearance for the team in an 11-point quarter-final defeat of Tipperary, he ended the championship with a winners' medal after Limerick's 0–16 to 1–11 defeat of Cork in the final. On 9 September 2017, Hayes lined out at centre-back in Limerick's 0–17 to 0–11 defeat of Kilkenny in the All-Ireland final. He ended the season by being named in the centre-back position on the Team of the Year. Hayes was again eligible for the under-21 team in 2018 and was also appointed team captain. He made his last under-21 appearance on 21 June 2018 in a Munster semi-final defeat by Tipperary.

=== Senior ===
==== 2017 season ====
Hayes was still just 18-years-old and out of the minor grade when he was drafted onto the senior panel by new manager John Kiely in advance of the 2017 Munster League. He made his first appearance of the pre-season competition on 8 January 2017, when he came on as a half-time-minute substitute for right corner-back Seánie O'Brien in a first-round defeat of Waterford. Hayes received his first competitive start on 22 January 2017 when he lined out at right wing-forward in a 24-point fourth-round defeat of Kerry. He was retained on the panel for the 2017 National League campaign, making six appearances, including at full-forward in Limerick's ten-point defeat by Galway in the semi-final. Once again making the cut for Limerick's 2017 Munster Championship panel, Hayes made his championship debut on 4 June 2017 when he scored 1-01 from play in a 3–17 to 2–16 defeat by Clare in the Munster semi-final.

==== 2018 season ====
In November 2017, Hayes was again named on the 38-man Limerick panel for the upcoming 2018 season. After playing no part in Limerick's successful Munster League campaign, he made a number of appearances throughout the subsequent National League, including at centre-forward in a second successive semi-final defeat. Hayes established himself as Limerick's first-choice centre-forward throughout the championship and was selected in that position when Limerick faced Galway in the 2018 All-Ireland final. He scored four points from play as Limerick won their first All-Ireland Championship title in 45 years after a 3–16 to 2–18 win. Hayes was also selected as the official man of the match. He ended the season by being nominated for an All-Star Award, while he was also named Young Hurler of the Year.

==== 2019 season ====
Hayes was again a regular for Limerick during the 2019 National League, making five appearances during their eight games. He was held scoreless from centre-forward when Limerick claimed their first Division 1 title since 1997 after a 1–24 to 0–19 win over Waterford in the final. Hayes ended the 2019 Munster Championship with his first provincial winners' medal after scoring 1-02 from play in the 2–26 to 2–14 win over Tipperary in the Munster final. He again received an All-Star nomination at the end of the season, while he was also shortlisted for a second successive Young Hurler of the Year award but lost out to Kilkenny's Adrian Mullen.

==== 2020 season ====
Commitments with the University of Limerick for the 2020 Fitzgibbon Cup campaign precluded him from lining out with Limerick during their title-winning Munster League campaign. The subsequent National League campaign saw Hayes line out in three of Limerick's five Division 1A games. On 25 October 2020, he was again at centre-forward in a 0–36 to 1–23 defeat of Clare in the delayed league final. For the Munster semi-final against Tipperary on 1 November 2020, he was surprisingly switched from the forwards to defence, lining out at left wing-back with Cian Lynch taking over the centre-forward position. Hayes ended the 2020 Munster Championship with a second successive winners' medal after again playing at left wing-back in the Munster final defeat of Waterford. On 13 December 2020, he scored a point from his now customary position of left wing-back when Limerick defeated Waterford by 0–30 to 0–19 in the All-Ireland final.

== Personal life ==
Hayes has worked as a HR officer since graduating from his business studies degree at the University of Limerick in 2020.

=== Court cases and convictions ===
In November 2023, a jury was sworn in to hear a trial of Hayes and three other men who were charged with violent disorder and assault causing harm to a man at a nightclub in Limerick city in October 2019. On 1 December, Hayes was found not guilty of assault causing harm but guilty of two charges of violent disorder at the nightclub. The trial heard Hayes was part of a "mob" that "chased", "punched", "stamped" and "kicked" a 24-year-old man, during a "vicious and sustained attack" inside and outside the nightclub. In March 2024, he was given a two-year suspended sentence, ordered to pay €10,000 in compensation, and ordered to keep the peace for that time.

On 14 July 2024, Hayes was arrested for dangerous driving having been recorded driving at over 150 km/h in a 100 km/h zone. On 10 September 2024 he was convicted of dangerous driving and disqualified from driving for two years. Following his conviction, an application was made for a court decision on whether his two-year suspended sentence for violent disorder would be re-activated. The case was due in court on 7 October 2024 but was adjourned for two months pending an appeal against the dangerous driving conviction.

Despite these convictions, Hayes was nominated for the 2024 GAA/GPA Hurler of the Year award, a decision that was widely criticised online. His receipt of a GAA/GPA All Star Award in 2024 also faced criticism including from the mother of the victim of Hayes' "violent disorder" who claimed that Hayes had never apologised to her son over the incident.

On 12 March 2025, Hayes lost his appeal against the dangerous driving conviction. On 21 March 2025, he appeared again before Limerick Circuit Criminal Court to consider the re-activation of his suspended sentence. The court ruled that he would not be jailed if he is deemed suitable for 180 hours of voluntary unpaid community service. The Probation Service later deemed him suitable to carry out community service in lieu of a prison sentence. He continues to play for the Limerick Senior Hurling team.

== Career statistics ==
As of match played 19 July 2026.

Team	Year	National League			Munster		All-Ireland		Total	
Team	Year	Division	Apps	Score	Apps	Score	Apps	Score	Apps	Score
Limerick	2017	Division 1B	6	2-05	1	1-01	1	0-02	8	3-08
Limerick	2018	Division 1B	3	1-03	4	0-05	4	1-08	11	2-16
Limerick	2019	Division 1A	5	0-01	5	1-07	1	0-00	11	1-08
Limerick	2020	Division 1A	4	0-05	3	0-03	2	0-01	9	0-09
Limerick	2021	Division 1A	4	1-02	2	2-00	2	0-00	8	3-02
	2022		2	0-00	3	2-01	2	0-07	7	2-08
	2023		3	1-06	5	0-02	2	0-03	10	1-11
	2024		1	0-01	5	0-08	1	0-01	7	0-10
	2025		3	0-01	4	0-02	1	0-00	8	0-03
	2026		5	0-00	5	0-01	2	0-03	11	0-04
Career total			36	5-24	37	6-30	18	1-25	91	12-79

== Honours ==
Kildimo-Pallaskenry

- Limerick Premier Intermediate Hurling Championship: 2020
- Limerick Intermediate Hurling Championship: 2017
- Limerick Junior A Football Championship: 2018

Limerick

- All-Ireland Senior Hurling Championship: 2018, 2020, 2021, 2022, 2023, 2026
- Munster Senior Hurling Championship: 2019, 2020, 2021, 2022, 2023, 2024, 2026
- National Hurling League: 2019, 2020, 2023, 2026
- All-Ireland Under-21 Hurling Championship: 2017
- Munster Under-21 Hurling Championship: 2017

Awards

- Bord Gáis Energy Under-21 Team of the Year: 2017
- All-Ireland Senior Hurling Championship Final Man of the Match: 2018
- GAA-GPA All-Star Young Hurler of the Year: 2018
- The Sunday Game Hurler of the Year: 2023
- The Sunday Game Team of the Year: 2020, 2021, 2022, 2023, 2024
- All-Star Award: 2020, 2021, 2022, 2023, 2024, 2026

Sporting positions
Preceded by Tom Morrissey	Limerick Under-21 Hurling Team Captain; 2018	Succeeded by Ronan Connolly
Awards
Preceded by Daithí Burke	All-Ireland Senior Hurling Final; Man of the Match; 2018	Succeeded by Noel McGrath
Preceded by Conor Whelan	GAA-GPA All-Star Young Hurler of the Year; 2018	Succeeded by Adrian Mullen
