= Paul Kinnerk =

Limerick Gaelic footballer and hurling coach

Personal information
- Native name: Pól Mac an Airchinnigh (Irish)
- Nickname: Kinnerkers
- Born: 12 December 1985 (age 40) Monaleen, County Limerick, Ireland
- Occupation: Secondary school teacher

Sport
- Sport: Gaelic football
- Position: Midfield
Club
- Years: Club
- Monaleen
Club titles
- Limerick titles: 5
Inter-county
- Years: County
- 2011-present: Limerick
Inter-county titles
- Munster titles: 0
- All-Irelands: 0
- NFL: 2
- NHL: 1 NFL (2013 Division 3), 1 NHL (2016)
- All Stars: 0

Paul Kinnerk (born 12 December 1985) is an Irish hurling coach and Gaelic footballer who plays as a midfielder at senior level for the Limerick county team.

== Playing career ==
Born in Monaleen, County Limerick, Kinnerk first played competitive hurling whilst at school in Ardscoil Rís. He arrived on the inter-county scene at the age of twenty when he first linked up with the Limerick under-21 team. He made his senior debut in the 2011 championship. Kinnerk went on to play a cameo role for Limerick over the following few seasons.

At club level he has won five championship medals (2001, 2005, 2010, 2011, 2016) with Monaleen.

== Managerial career ==
Kinnerk has also been heavily involved in team management and coaching, with his first involvement in senior inter-county hurling being with the Clare county team. Over a number of years he served as coach and selector to the Clare minor, under-21 and senior hurling teams. In his time with as a coach with the Clare minor hurlers, the team won successive (2010, 2011) Munster titles. The following three years (2012 - 2014) saw him serve as both coach to the Clare U21 and Clare senior team; roles he fulfilled while also playing senior inter-county football with his native county Limerick. The Clare U21 teams were undefeated during this period, winning three munster and three all-Ireland titles. Under his guidance, the senior team won the 2013 All-Ireland Senior Hurling Championship title.

In 2017, Kinnerk took up a role as coach to the Limerick senior hurling team. In the following season, Limerick won the 2018 All-Ireland Senior Hurling Championship for the first time since 1973. Under Kinnerk's partnership with manager John Kiely, the team would go on to win another four All-Ireland SHC titles in 2020, 2021, 2022 and 2023 along with six Munster SHC titles (2019, 2020, 2021, 2022, 2023, 2024) and three National League titles (2019, 2020, 2023, 2026).
