= Gearóid Hegarty =

Limerick hurler (born 1994)

Personal information
- Native name: Gearóid Ó hÉigeartaigh (Irish)
- Nickname: Hego
- Born: 10 August 1994 (age 32) Limerick, Ireland
- Occupation: Secondary school teacher
- Height: 6 ft 4 in (193 cm)

Sport
- Sport: Hurling
- Position: Right wing-forward
Club
- Years: Club
- 2012-present: St Patrick's
Club titles
- Limerick titles: 0
College
- Years: College
- University of Limerick
College titles
- Sigerson titles: 0
- Fitzgibbon titles: 1
Inter-county*
Years	County	Apps (scores)
2016-present	Limerick	59 (9–110)
Inter-county titles
- Munster titles: 7
- All-Irelands: 6
- NHL: 4
- All Stars: 5
- *Inter County team apps and scores correct as of 23:37, 30 October 2026.

Gearóid M. Hegarty (born 10 August 1994) is an Irish hurler and Gaelic footballer who plays as a right wing-forward for club side St Patrick's and at inter-county level with the Limerick senior hurling team. He is a former member of the Limerick senior football team.

== Early life ==
Born and raised in Limerick, Hegarty was educated at Castletroy College and played in all grades of hurling during his time there. In 2011, he was part of the first Castletroy team to play in the Dr Harty Cup. During his studies at the University of Limerick (UL), Hegarty was selected for the college's senior hurling team, while he also lined out as a Gaelic footballer in the Sigerson Cup. He won a Fitzgibbon Cup medal in February 2018 following UL's 2–21 to 2–15 win over Dublin City University in the final.

== Club career ==
Hegarty began his club career at juvenile and underage levels as a dual player with the St Patrick's club, before progressing to adult level. He was part of the St Patrick's team that lost the 2014 Limerick SFC final to Ballylanders. After losing the final to Na Piarsaigh in 2016, Hegarty won a Limerick JAHC medal in 2017, following a 1–10 to 0–08 win over Kilmallock in a replay.

== Inter-county career ==
Hegarty first appeared on the inter-county scene for Limerick in 2012. He was a member of the minor hurling team's extended panel that year, but was never selected for any matchday panel. He later lined out with the Limerick under-21 football team. Hegarty became a dual under-21 player in 2015 and won a Munster U21HC medal after a 0–22 to 0–19 win over Clare in the final. He was later at midfield when Limerick beat Wexford by 0–26 to 1–07 in the 2015 All-Ireland U21HC final.

Hegarty's first senior appearance for Limerick came as a Gaelic footballer in February 2014, when he lined out in a 2–11 to 0–11 National Football League win over Longford. He made his Munster SFC later that season in a 2–14 to 1–11 defeat by Tipperary. Hegarty played in the early rounds of the National Football League in 2016 before joining the Limerick senior hurling team. He made his debut in that code in March 2016, when he replaced Seánie O'Brien at half-time in a 6–29 to 1–12 defeat of Laois. Hegarty later made his Munster SHC debut in a 3–12 to 1–16 defeat by Tipperary. He left the Limerick senior football team in 2017 and committed solely to the hurlers after an end to the facilitating of dual players within the county.

Hegarty was selected at right wing-forward when Limerick played Galway in the 2018 All-Ireland SHC final. He was held scoreless but ended the game with his first All-Ireland SHC medal following the 3–16 to 2–18 win, with Limerick claiming their first title in 45 years. Hegarty ended the season by being nominated for an All-Star Award. He added a National Hurling League medal to his collection in March 2019, when Limerick beat Waterford in the 1–24 to 0–19 victory. Hegarty won his first Munster SHC medal in June 2019, after scoring three points from right wing-forward in the 2–26 to 2–14 defeat of Tipperary in the final.

After retaining the National League title in a COVID-delayed final in October 2020, Hegarty later won a second consecutive Munster SHC after a four-point win over Waterford. He claimed his second All-Ireland SHC medal in December 2020, as Waterford were once again beaten by 0–30 to 0–19. Hegarty was also named man of the match and ended the season by collecting his first All-Star and being named GAA/GPA Hurler of the Year.

Hegarty won his third Munster SHC medal in July 2021, as Limerick claimed a third consecutive title for the first time in 85 years following a 3–21 to 2–29 win over Tipperary. To his collection was added a third All-Ireland SHC medal, after scoring 2–02 in the 3–32 to 1–22 defeat of Cork. Hegarty ended the season by being presented with a second consecutive All-Star.

Limerick retained the Munster SHC title for a fourth consecutive year in June 2022, with Hegarty scoring a goal in the 1–29 to 0–29 extra-time win over Clare. He later won his third consecutive All-Ireland SHC medal, after scoring 1–05 in a man of the match display in the 1–31 to 2–26 win over Kilkenny in the 2022 All-Ireland SHC final. He ended the season with his third consecutive All-Star.

Hegarty won his third National League medal in April 2023, however, he was held scoreless in the 2–20 to 0–15 win over Kilkenny in the final. He later claimed his fifth Munster SHC medal, as Limerick beat Clare by 1–23 to 1–22 to win a record-equalling fifth consecutive title. Hegarty again lined out at right wing-forward when Limerick won a record-equalling fourth consecutive All-Ireland SHC title, following a 0–30 to 2–15 win over Kilkenny in the 2023 All-Ireland SHC final.

Hegarty scored 1–02 from play when Limerick won a record-breaking sixth consecutive Munster SHC title after a 1–26 to 1–20 win over Clare in the 2024 Munster SHC final. Limerick's attempt to win a record fifth consecutive All-Ireland SHC title ended with a semi-final defeat by Cork, however, Hegarty ended the season by collecting his fourth All-Star.

After a trophy-less 2025 season, Limerick regained the National League title with a six-point win over Cork in April 2026, with Hegarty claiming his fourth winners' medal. He later collected a seventh Munster SHC medal, as Limerick also regained that title with a 1–21 to 2–17 win over Cork in the final. Hegarty won a sixth All-Ireland SHC medal in July 2022, after a 1–29 to 1–18 win over Galway in the 2026 All-Ireland SHC final.

== Personal life ==
His father, Ger Hegarty, also played with Limerick and was an All-Ireland runner-up in 1994. Hegarty works as a business teacher at the Desmond College in Newcastle West. In August 2026, he married Limerick Gaelic footballer and camogie player Niamh McCarthy.

== Career statistics ==
As of match played 19 July 2026.

Team	Year	National League			Munster		All-Ireland		Total	
Team	Year	Division	Apps	Score	Apps	Score	Apps	Score	Apps	Score
Limerick	2016	Division 1B	3	0-00	1	0-01	2	0-01	6	0-02
Limerick	2017	Division 1B	6	2-15	0	0-00	1	0-02	7	2-17
Limerick	2018	Division 1B	6	1-11	4	1-05	4	0-08	14	2-24
Limerick	2019	Division 1A	8	1-09	4	1-06	1	0-00	13	2-15
Limerick	2020	Division 1A	5	2-13	3	0-09	2	0-11	10	2-33
Limerick	2021	Division 1A	3	0-03	2	0-05	2	2-03	7	2-11
Limerick	2022	Division 1A	4	0-08	5	1-10	2	1-06	11	2-24
Limerick	2023	Division 1A	6	0-06	5	0-06	2	0-04	13	0-16
Limerick	2024	Division 1A	6	0-13	5	1-11	1	0-01	12	1-25
Limerick	2025	Division 1A	3	0-01	5	0-09	1	0-04	9	0-14
Limerick	2026	Division 1A	7	0-11	5	2-08	2	0-00	14	2-19
Total			57	6-90	39	6-70	20	3-40	116	15-200

== Honours ==
University of Limerick

- Fitzgibbon Cup (1): 2018

St Patrick's

- Limerick Junior A Hurling Championship (1): 2017

Limerick

- All-Ireland Senior Hurling Championship (6): 2018, 2020, 2021, 2022, 2023, 2026
- Munster Senior Hurling Championship (7): 2019, 2020, 2021, 2022, 2023, 2024, 2026
- National Hurling League (4): 2019, 2020, 2023, 2026
- All-Ireland Under-21 Hurling Championship (1): 2015
- Munster Under-21 Hurling Championship (1): 2015

Individual

- All Stars Hurler of the Year (2): 2020, 2026
- All-Star Award (5): 2020, 2021, 2022, 2024, 2026
- The Sunday Game Team of the Year (3): 2020, 2022, 2026
- The Sunday Game Hurler of the Year (2): 2020, 2026
- All-Ireland Senior Hurling Championship Final Man of the Match (2): 2020, 2022
- GAA/GPA Player of the Month: October 2020, December 2020

Awards
Preceded by Noel McGrath	All-Ireland SHC Final; Man of the Match; 2020	Succeeded by Cian Lynch
Preceded by Cian Lynch	All-Ireland SHC Final; Man of the Match; 2022	Succeeded by Peter Casey
