= 1933–34 National Hurling League =

Seventh season of the National Hurling League

League details
- Dates: 15 October 1933 – 25 March 1934

League champions
- Winners: Limerick (1st win)
- Captain: Mick Kennedy

League runners-up
- Runners-up: Dublin

The 1933–34 National Hurling League was the seventh edition of the National Hurling League, which ran from 15 October 1933 until 25 March 1934.

Limerick defeated Dublin by 3-6 to 3-3 in the final.

Limerick also won the All-Ireland Championship in 1934, the third time that a team completed the league-championship double.

== National Hurling League ==
=== Results ===
25 March 1934 Final	Limerick	3-6 – 3-3	Dublin	Gaelic Grounds
