= 1934–35 National Hurling League =

Eighth season of the National Hurling League

League details
- Dates: 7 October 1934 – 23 June 1935
- Teams: 9

League champions
- Winners: Limerick (2nd win)
- Captain: Timmy Ryan

League runners-up
- Runners-up: Kilkenny

The 1934–35 National Hurling League was the eighth edition of the National Hurling League, which ran from 7 October 1934 until 23 June 1935.

The nine participating teams were Clare, Cork, Dublin, Galway, Kilkenny, Laois, Limerick, Tipperary and Waterford who agreed to play an eight-game format whereby each team would play each of their eight rivals once with two points awarded for a win and one point awarded for a drawn game. The team with most points at the completion of the season would be declared National Hurling League champions.

Limerick completed their eight-game programme without defeat and were declared the champions for the second successive year while Waterford finished with the fewest points.

== National Hurling League ==
=== Table ===
Pos	Team	Pld	W	D	L	SF	SA	Pts	Notes
1	Limerick	8	7	1	0	33-43	17-27	15	National League champions
2	Kilkenny	8	7	0	1	26-47	19-27	14	National League runners-up
3	Cork	8	4	1	3	35-27	28-31	9	
4	Dublin	8	4	0	4	39-33	27-40	8	
5	Galway	8	3	1	4	19-29	28-33	7	
6	Clare	8	3	0	5	37-25	25-30	6	
7	Tipperary	8	2	1	5	39-33	27-40	5	
8	Laois	8	2	2	4	19-28	32-33	5	
9	Waterford	8	0	2	6	23-33	42-39	2	

- Laois given a walkover by Clare
