= 1935–36 National Hurling League =

Ninth season of the National Hurling League

League details
- Dates: 6 October 1935 – 5 April 1936
- Teams: 9

League champions
- Winners: Limerick (3rd win)
- Captain: Timmy Ryan

League runners-up
- Runners-up: Cork

The 1935–36 National Hurling League was the ninth edition of the National Hurling League, which ran from 6 October 1935 until 5 April 1936.

The nine participating teams were Clare, Cork, Dublin, Galway, Kilkenny, Laois, Limerick, Tipperary and Waterford who agreed to play an eight game format whereby each team would play each of their eight rivals once with two points awarded for a win and one point awarded for a drawn game. The team with most points at the completion of the season would be declared National Hurling League champions.

Limerick completed their eight game programme without defeat and were declared the champions for the third successive year while Waterford finished with the fewest points, however, they were not relegated the following season.

Limerick also won the All-Ireland Championship in 1936, the fourth time that a team completed the league-championship double.

== National Hurling League ==
=== Table ===
Pos	Team	Pld	W	D	L	F	A	Diff	Pts	Notes
1	Limerick	8	7	1	0	39-31	17-21	76	15	National Hurling League champions
2	Cork	8	6	0	2	36-32	20-24	56	12	National Hurling League runners-up
3	Galway	8	5	0	3	22-32	26-18	2	10	
4	Dublin	8	4	1	3	22-24	25-18	-3	9	
5	Clare	8	4	0	4	33-15	37-23	-20	8	
6	Kilkenny	8	3	0	5	27-24	30-25	-10	6	
7	Tipperary	8	2	2	4	30-23	34-31	-20	6	
8	Laois	8	2	0	6	23-21	31-30	-33	4	
9	Waterford	8	1	0	7	20-18	32-30	-48	2	
