= 1936 All-Ireland Senior Hurling Championship =

Championship details
- Dates: 26 April – 6 September 1936
- Teams: 13

All-Ireland champions
- Winning team: Limerick (5th win)
- Captain: Mick Mackey

All-Ireland Finalists
- Losing team: Kilkenny
- Captain: Paddy Larkin

Provincial champions
- Munster: Limerick
- Leinster: Kilkenny
- Ulster: Not Played
- Connacht: Not Played

Championship statistics
- No. matches played: 13
- Goals total: 111 (8.5 per game)
- Points total: 132 (10.1 per game)
- Top Scorer: Mick Mackey (7–12)
- All-Star Team: See here

The 1936 All-Ireland Senior Hurling Championship was the 50th staging of the All-Ireland hurling championship since its establishment by the Gaelic Athletic Association in 1887. The championship began on 26 April 1936 and ended on 6 September 1936.

Kilkenny entered the championship as defending champions, however, they were defeated by Limerick in the All-Ireland final on a score line of 5–6 to 1–5 victory.

== Teams ==
A total of thirteen teams contested the championship, however, there were some changes from the 1935 championship. Wexford declined to field a team in Leinster, while in Munster Kerry reentered the championship after a long absence.

=== Team summaries ===
Team	Colours	Most recent success		
Team	Colours	All-Ireland	Provincial	League
Clare	Saffron and blue	1914	1932	
Cork	Red and white	1931	1931	1929–1930
Dublin	Navy and blue	1927	1934	1928–1929
Galway	Maroon and white	1923	1922	1930–1931
Kerry	Green and gold	1891	1891	
Kildare	White			
Kilkenny	Black and amber	1935	1935	1932–1933
Laois	Blue and white	1915	1915	
Limerick	Green and white	1934	1935	1935–1936
Meath	Green and gold			
Offaly	Green, white and gold			
Tipperary	Blue and gold	1930	1930	1927–1928
Waterford	Blue and white			

== Results ==
=== Leinster Senior Hurling Championship ===
26 April Quarter-final	Kildare	3–3 – 9–11	Offaly	Naas

17 May Semi-final	Laois	5–5 – 1–1	Offaly	O'Moore Park

14 June Quarter-final	Meath	2–4 – 5–7	Dublin	Páirc Tailteann

12 July Semi-final	Kilkenny	7–8 – 1–6	Dublin	Wexford Park

26 July Final	Kilkenny	4–6 – 2–5	Laois	Nowlan Park
	M White 2–0, J Dunne 1–0, M Power 1–0, L Meagher 0–3, J Walsh 0–2, L Carroll 0–1.		J Jones 1–1, M Nolan 1–0, J Cashin 0–3, P Farrell 0–1.

=== Munster Senior Hurling Championship ===
First round

7 June 1936 First round	Clare	5–07 – 4–04	Waterford	Páirc Mac Gearailt, Fermoy

Second round

17 May 1936 Second round	Tipperary	10–02 – 3–04	Kerry	Mallow Town Park, Mallow
				Referee: W Clancy (Cork)

5 July 1936 Second round	Cork	3–07 – 4–04	Clare	Thurles Sportsfield, Thurles
	D Cogan 1–1, M Brennan 1–1, J Kenneally 1–1, P Dowling 0–3, W O'Driscoll 0–1.		P Loughnane 3–0, B Loughnane 1–0, J Mullane 0–1, J Houlihan 0–1, M Hennessy 0–1, PJ Quaine 0–1.	Referee: W Gleeson (Limerick)

12 July 1936 Second round replay	Cork	2–03 – 9–01	Clare	Gaelic Grounds, Limerick
	W O'Driscoll/B Barrett 1–0, J Quirke 1–0, P Dowling 0–1, J Barrett 0–1, D Cogan 0–1.		M Hennessy 4–0, M Power 2–0, P Loughnane 2–0, J Quirke 1–1.	Referee: W Gleeson (Limerick)

Semi-final

19 July 1936 Semi-final	Tipperary	5–07 – 3–02	Clare	Cork Athletic Grounds, Cork
	M Bourke 1–4, J Coffey 1–1, J Devaney 1–0, AN Other 1–0, T Treacy 0–2, J Heeney 1–0, B O'Donnell 0–1.		P Loughnane 1–0, M Hennessy 1–0, Jones 1–0, O'Halloran 0–1, Quirke 0–1.	Attendance: 10,050; Referee: W Gleeson (Limerick)

Final

1 August 1936 Final	Tipperary	4–06 – 8–05	Limerick	Thurles Sportsfield, Thurles
	J Heeney 2–0, J Coffey 1–1, J Devaney 1–0, B O'Donnell 0–3, M Bourke 0–2.		M Mackey 5–3, P McMahon 2–0, D Clohessy 1–1, J Roche 0–1.	Attendance: 26,435; Referee: J O'Regan (Cork)

=== All-Ireland Senior Hurling Championship ===
15 August Semi-final	Limerick	4–9 – 2–4	Galway	St. Cronan's Park

6 September Final	Limerick	5–6 – 1–5	Kilkenny	Croke Park
				Attendance: 51,535; Referee: J O'Regan (Cork)

== Championship statistics ==
=== Miscellaneous ===
- The All-Ireland semi-final between Limerick and Galway is suspended ten minutes into the second half when a melee develops and a Galway player is knocked unconscious. At a subsequent meeting of the Gaelic Athletic Association's (GAA) Central Council, Limerick were awarded the match as Galway were suspended from the championship.

== Sources ==
- Corry, Eoghan, The GAA Book of Lists (Hodder Headline Ireland, 2005).
- Donegan, Des, The Complete Handbook of Gaelic Games (DBA Publications Limited, 2005).
