= Limerick GAA =

County board of the Gaelic Athletic Association in Ireland

- Irish: Luimneach
- Province: Munster
- Dominant sport: Hurling
- Ground(s): Páirc na nGael, Limerick
- County colours: Green White

County teams
- Football Championship: Sam Maguire Cup
- Hurling Championship: Liam MacCarthy Cup
- Ladies' Gaelic football: Brendan Martin Cup
- Camogie: O'Duffy Cup

The Limerick County Board of the Gaelic Athletic Association (GAA) (Irish: Cumann Lúthchleas Gael, Coiste Chontae Luimneach) or Limerick GAA is one of the 32 county boards of the GAA in Ireland, and is responsible for Gaelic games in County Limerick. The county board is also responsible for the Limerick county teams.

The county hurling team has the 4th highest total of All-Ireland Senior Hurling Championship (SHC) titles, behind Kilkenny, Cork and Tipperary. The county football team was the last from the province of Munster both to win an All-Ireland Senior Football Championship (SFC), as well as to appear in the final.

As of 2009, there were 30 clubs affiliated to Limerick GAA — the third highest, alongside Antrim.

== Hurling ==
=== Clubs ===
Clubs contest the following competitions:

- Limerick Senior Hurling Championship
- Limerick Intermediate Hurling Championship
- Limerick Junior Hurling Championship
- Limerick Minor Hurling Championship
- Limerick Under-21 Hurling Championship

The senior competition's most successful club is Patrickswell, with 20 titles. Ahane has 19 titles.

=== County team ===
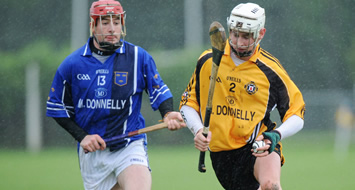
Limerick's Andrew O'Shaughnessy (left) representing Munster in the 2008 Railway Cup hurling semi-final against Ulster

Limerick's first outright success in hurling was achieved when the Kilfinane club defeated Kilkenny GAA club Tullaroan in the final of the 1897 All-Ireland Senior Hurling Championship (SHC). At that time, counties were represented by champion clubs.

Limerick won the 1918 All-Ireland SHC, then repeated the feat in the 1921 All-Ireland SHC when the team won the inaugural Liam MacCarthy Cup. The team that achieved those wins featured many players who contested eight consecutive Munster Senior Hurling Championship (SHC) finals (1917–1924 inclusive), a record that has never been equalled.

The team won five consecutive National Hurling League (NHL) titles during the 1930s, a record still unequalled. Those titles were won in 1933–34, 1934–35, 1935–36, 1936–37 and 1937–38. Limerick also won four consecutive Munster SHC titles, and remains the only team other than Cork to have done so. After winning All-Ireland SHC titles in 1934 and in 1936, another All-Ireland SHC title followed in 1940. The team from this era did much to raise the profile of the sport: whereas around 30,000 people attended the 1930 All-Ireland SHC Final, attendances had risen to 50,000 by the 1940 final and players such as the Mackeys (John and Mick), Ryans (Timmy and Mick), Clohesseys (Dave and Paddy), Bob McConkey and Paddy Scanlon were recalled for decades afterwards. Victory in 1940 left Limerick with six All-Ireland SHC titles and as the only team from outside the "big three" (Cork, Tipperary and Kilkenny) to have won more than one All-Ireland SHC title. Dublin had at that stage also six All-Ireland SHC titles but no native of that county had played on any of its winning teams. Limerick won a sixth NHL title in 1946–47 but success soon became a rarity.

Limerick won the 1970–71 NHL title and soon followed this by winning the 1973 All-Ireland SHC, its seventh title. Four further NHL titles followed that century: 1983–84, 1984–85, 1991–92 and, lastly, 1997.

The 2018 season concluded with Limerick winning the 2018 All-Ireland SHC, the team's first since 1973, with a 3–16 to 2–18 point defeat of Galway in the final. The team built on this success, winning the NHL in 2019, 2020 and 2023, the Munster SHC in 2019, 2020, 2021, 2022, 2023 and 2024 and the All-Ireland SHC again in 2020, 2021, 2022 ,2023 and 2026

== Football ==
=== Clubs ===
Clubs contest the Limerick Senior Football Championship. That competition's most successful club is Commercials with 16 titles, followed by Claughaun with 14 titles.

=== County team ===
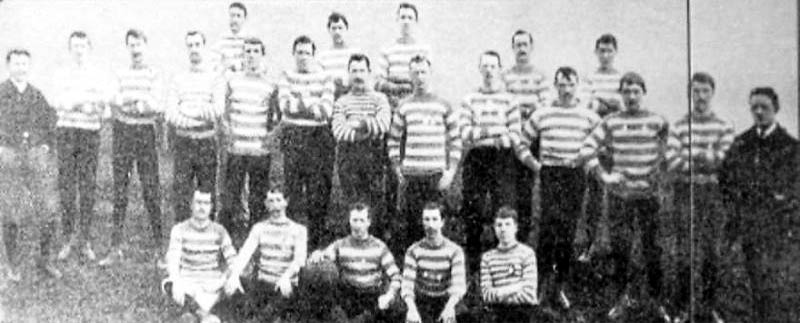
1887 Limerick football team, All-Ireland champions

Limerick won the first All-Ireland Senior Football Championship in 1887 and repeated this success in 1896, when it became the first non-Leinster team to beat the then all-conquering Dublin in a championship match.

Limerick plays in Division 3 of the National Football League, having been promoted from Division 4 in 2025.

Between 1953 and 1964, Limerick did not play in the Munster Football Championship.

== Camogie ==
Under Camogie's National Development Plan 2010-2015, "Our Game, Our Passion", five new camogie clubs were expected to have been established in the county by 2015. Three Limerick clubs have won the All-Ireland Club SCC. They are Granagh-Ballingarry (3), Ballyagran (1978) and Croagh Kilfinny (1975).

Limerick contested the All-Ireland SCC final of 1980, losing to Cork in a replay. They first contested the Munster Championship in 1922-4, but the game struggled and had to undergo further revivals in 1932, 1947 and 1960. This culminated in the county team's appearance in the All-Ireland JCC of 1977 and the county team's appearance in the All-Ireland SCC final of 1980, which Limerick lost to Cork in a replay.

Former Limerick hurler Ciarán Carey managed the Limerick camogie team when it was in the second tier. He won both league and championship honours when doing so. This included the 2007 edition of the All-Ireland Intermediate Camogie Championship.

Former Limerick hurling goalkeeper Joe Quaid managed the Limerick camogie team to the 2014 edition of the All-Ireland Intermediate Camogie Championship.

Declan Nash – who had been the team's strength and conditioning coach for the previous three years – became Limerick camogie manager after the incumbent, John Tuohy, left when the 2018 National Camogie League had ended. Nash was to continue in the role of Limerick camogie manager into the 2019 season. When Nash was manager in 2019, Ciarán Carey became involved with the Limerick camogie team again, this time in an "advisory role".

Retired bank official Pat Ryan was appointed Limerick camogie manager for the 2021 season. Ryan referred positively to his previous experience of being involved with the Antrim camogie team when his banking work brought him to that part of the country, "they were a great bunch of girls – we had girls coming an hour and a half from Ballycastle or five hours on a bus from Galway".

John Lillis was manager of the team for a heavy (2–19 [25] to 0–11) defeat in the 2023 championship, which left Limerick facing the prospect of relegation.

Joe Quaid returned as Limerick camogie manager for the 2024 season. In 2025, as Limerick exited the championship with a heavy (4–26 [38] to 0–8) defeat, Quaid complained about the structure of the competition and spoke about "the big problem, turnover of players. I hope all these girls will stay together next year".

Agnes Hourigan was a notable president of the Camogie Association during the 1970s. Pamela Fitzgerald from Newcastle West played for the team, as did the Olympic athlete and field hockey international Naomi Carroll.

Limerick has the following achievements in camogie.

- All-Ireland Senior Camogie Championship Runners-Up 1980
- All-Ireland Intermediate Camogie Championship Winners 1996, 2007, 2014 Runners-Up 2000, 2002, 2013
- All-Ireland Junior Camogie Championship Winners 1977, 1995 Runners-Up 1988, 1994, Junior A Winners 2014
- National Camogie League Runners-Up 1978, 1979, 2002
- National Camogie League Div 2/Junior Winners 1991, 1992, 1996, 2007, 2013, Div 4 Winners 2014
- All-Ireland Minor Camogie Championship A Winners 2014, B Winners 2009, 2011
- All Ireland under-16 B Winners 2001, 2002, 2011

== Ladies' football ==
Ladies' football began taking hold in Limerick during the 1970s, with clubs like Ballyagran and Mungret pioneering the movement. Despite early struggles with player numbers and resources, momentum built in the 1990s with the formation of a development committee focused on school and youth engagement. As of 2025, Limerick competes in Division 3 of the Ladies' National Football League.

Limerick's progression in the Ladies' National Football League is as follows: • 2016 Division 4 champion: Limerick gained promotion. • 2024 Division 4 finalist: Limerick narrowly lost to Carlow, but gained promotion to Division 3 for the 2025 season.

Limerick's championship success is at Junior level: • 2010 All-Ireland Junior Championship: Limerick defeated Louth in the final, with Marie Curtin scoring 2-5 and receiving Player of the Match. • 2018 All-Ireland Junior Championship: Limerick defeated Louth by 5–6 to 0–8 in the final at Croke Park. • Runner-up finishes: • 2009 – Loss to Antrim • 2023 – Loss to Down

Club players who became notable for their involvement in different sports: • Aoibheann Clancy (Galtee Gaels) – former underage GAA player who chose soccer, later made a substitute appearance for the Republic of Ireland. • Marie Curtin (Mungret St Paul's) – dual star in soccer and GAA; Player of the Match with 2–5 in the 2010 All-Ireland Junior final. Earned 55 caps for the Republic of Ireland in soccer.
