= 1934 All-Ireland Senior Hurling Championship =

Championship details
- Dates: 6 May – 30 September 1934
- Teams: 12

All-Ireland champions
- Winning team: Limerick (4th win)
- Captain: Timmy Ryan

All-Ireland Finalists
- Losing team: Dublin
- Captain: Stephen Feeny

Provincial champions
- Munster: Limerick
- Leinster: Dublin
- Ulster: Not Played
- Connacht: Not Played

Championship statistics
- No. matches played: 13
- Goals total: 95 (7.30 per game)
- Points total: 105 (8.07 per game)
- Top Scorer: Dave Clohessey (8–2)
- All-Star Team: See here

The All-Ireland Senior Hurling Championship 1934 was the 48th series of the All-Ireland Senior Hurling Championship, Ireland's premier hurling knock-out competition. Limerick won the championship, beating Dublin 5–2 to 2–6 in a replay of the final.

== Format ==
The All-Ireland Senior Hurling Championship was run on a provincial basis as usual. All games were played on a knockout basis whereby once a team lost they were eliminated from the championship. The format for the All-Ireland series of games ran as follows:

- The winners of the Leinster Championship advanced directly to the All-Ireland final.
- The winners of the Munster Championship advanced directly to a lone All-Ireland semi-final.
- Galway, a team who faced no competition in the Connacht Championship, entered the championship at the All-Ireland semi-final stage where they played the Munster champions.
- There were no representatives from the Ulster Championship in the All-Ireland series.

== Results ==
=== Leinster Senior Hurling Championship ===
May 6, 1934
Quarter-final

Meath	8–3 – 6–2	Wexford

Croke Park, Dublin

May 13, 1934
Quarter-final

Offaly	2–1 – 6–5	Laois

St. Brendan's Park, Birr

May 27, 1934
Semi-final

Kilkenny	3–7 – 4–2	Laois

Nowlan Park, Kilkenny

June 24, 1934
Semi-final

Dublin	5–4 – 0–1	Meath

Páirc Tailteann, Navan

August 12, 1934
Final

Dublin	2–8 – 4–2	Kilkenny
T Treacy 1–4, D O'Neill 1–0, S Hegarty 0–2, J O'Connell 0–1, N Wade 0–1.		J Dunne 2–0, M Power 1–2, M White 1–0.

O'Moore Park, Portlaoise

August 19, 1934
Final replay

Dublin	3–5 – 2–2	Kilkenny
S Hegarty 1–1, T Treacy 1–1, D O'Neill 1–1, J O'Connell 0–1, S Muldowney 0–1.		L Meagher 1–1, J Duggan 1–0, M Power 0–1,

O'Moore Park, Portlaoise

Quarter-finals
Meath	8–3
Wexford	6–2
Offaly	2–1
Laois	6–5

Semi-finals
Dublin	5–4
Meath	0–1
Kilkenny	3–7
Laois	4–2

Leinster final
Dublin (R)	2–8; 3–5
Kilkenny (R)	4–2; 2–2

=== Munster Senior Hurling Championship ===
June 10, 1934
Quarter-final

Cork	7–5 – 5–6	Tipperary

Walsh Park, Waterford
Attendance: 15,000

June 24, 1934
Quarter-final

Limerick	6–4 – 3–2	Clare

Gaelic Grounds, Limerick

July 8, 1934
Semi-final

Limerick	3–4 – 2–2	Cork

Thurles Sportsfield, Thurles
Attendance: 30,000

July 22, 1934
Final

Limerick	4–8 – 2–5	Waterford
M Mackey 1–7, D Clohessy 2–0, P Clohessy 1–0, J Mackey 0–1.		D Wyse 1–2, Condon 1–1, Ryan 0–1, Gough 0–1.

Cork Athletic Grounds, Cork
Attendance: 15,000

Quarter-finals		Semi-final		Munster final
Limerick	6–4
Clare	3–2	Limerick	3–4
Cork	7–5	Cork	2–2
Tipperary	5–6			Limerick	4–8
				Waterford	2–5

=== All-Ireland Senior Hurling Championship ===
Semi-final

5 August 1934 Semi-final	Galway	2–04 – 4-04	Limerick	St. Cronan's Park, Roscrea
	J Deely 1–0, Kelly 1–0, M Gill 0–2, M King 0–1, Hanniffy 0–1.			Referee: M Walsh (Dublin)

Finals

2 September 1934 Final	Limerick	2–07 – 3-04	Dublin	Croke Park, Dublin
				Attendance: 34,867; Referee: S Jordan (Galway)

30 September 1934 Final replay	Limerick	5–02 – 2-06	Dublin	Croke Park, Dublin
				Attendance: 30,250; Referee: S Jordan (Galway)

== Championship statistics ==
=== Scoring ===
- Widest winning margin: 18 points
  - Dublin 5–4 : 0–1 Meath (Leinster semi-final, 24 June 1934)
- Most goals in a match: 14
  - Meath 8–3 : 6–2 Wexford (Leinster quarter-final, 6 May 1934)
- Most points in a match: 12
  - Limerick 4–8 : 2–5 Waterford (Munster final, 22 July 1934)
- Most goals by one team in a match: 8
  - Meath 8–3 : 6–2 Wexford (Leinster quarter-final, 6 May 1934)
- Most goals scored by a losing team: 5
  - Wexford 6–2 : 8–3 Meath (Leinster quarter-final, 6 May 1934)
- Most points scored by a losing team: 6
  - Tipperary 5–6 : 7–5 Cork (Munster quarter-final, 10 June 1934)
  - Dublin 2–6 : 5–2 Limerick (All-Ireland final, 2 September 1934)

=== Miscellaneous ===
- On 3 June three-in-a-row hopefuls Kilkenny set sail for the United States where they took part in a series of exhibition games. The team returned home on 14 July and resumed their participation on the Leinster Championship.

== Golden Jubilee ==
The All-Ireland Senior Hurling Championship 1934 marked the fiftieth anniversary of the foundation of the Gaelic Athletic Association.

- In honour of the golden jubilee a special set of All-Ireland medals were struck and presented to the championship winner, and a postage stamp was issued on 27 July 1934, which was designed by Richard King (artist).
  "They were all delighted in Limerick over the G.A.A. Jubilee Stamp. They regard it as an omen that the colours chosen for the jersey of the hurler depicted on the stamp are those of the winners of the 1934 All-Ireland".
Official Brochure

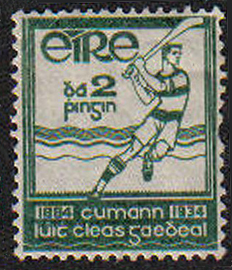
Commemorating the Golden Jubilee of GAA

Souvenir supplement published by the Irish Independent to celebrate the golden jubilee.

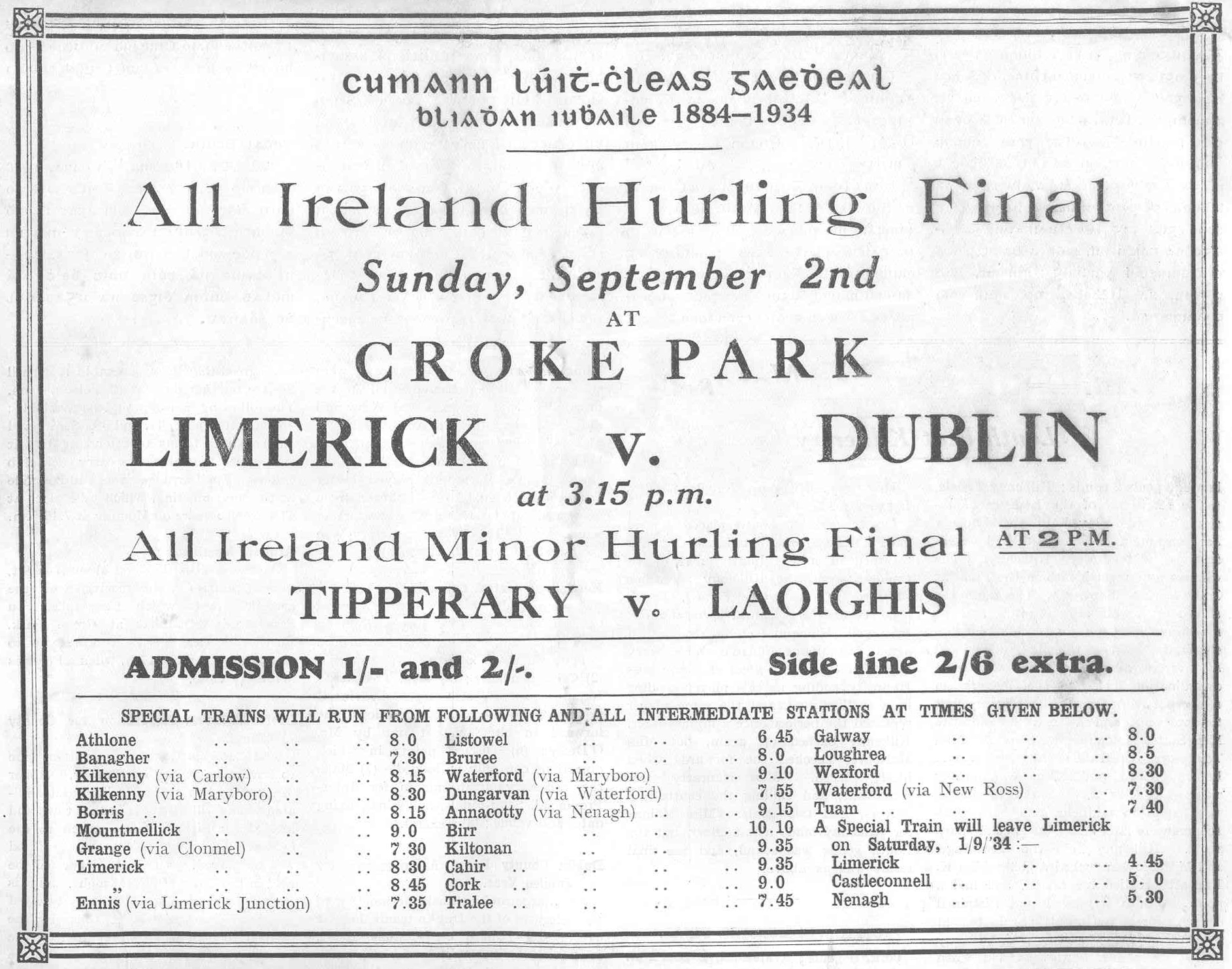
Advertisement from An Gaedheal 1 September 1934.

== See also ==
- James Andrew Walsh (hurler)
- Patrons of the GAA prior to 1934 (Irish Independent Golden Jubilee Supplement, 1934)

== Sources ==
- Corry, Eoghan, The GAA Book of Lists (Hodder Headline Ireland, 2005).
- Donegan, Des, The Complete Handbook of Gaelic Games (DBA Publications Limited, 2005).
