= Tipperary county hurling team results (2020–2029) =

This article contains the results of the Tipperary county hurling team in the Championship during the 2020s.

== 2020 ==
1 November
16:00
Munster Semi-final

Tipperary	2–17 – 3–23	Limerick
Jason Forde 0-9 (0-9f), Jake Morris 1-1, John McGrath 1-0, Noel McGrath 0-2, Brendan Maher, Alan Flynn, Niall O’Meara, Michael Breen 0-1 each.	Report B Hogan; C Barrett, B Heffernan, S O’Brien; R Maher, B Maher, Padraic Maher; N McGrath, A Flynn; M Kehoe, J Forde, N O’Meara; J McGrath, S Callanan (c), J Morris; Subs – M Breen for Kehoe (45 mins), John Meagher for Padraic Maher (50 mins), D McCormack for O’Meara (54 mins), J O’Dwyer for Morris (61 mins), P Cadell for Heffernan (68 mins).	Aaron Gillane 2-6 (1-0 pen, 0-5f), Seamus Flanagan 1-1, Diarmaid Byrnes 0-3 (0-2f), Cian Lynch, William O’Donoghue, Gearoid Hegarty, Graeme Mulcahy, Tom Morrissey 0-2 each, Peter Casey, David Reidy, Pat Ryan 0-1 each.

Páirc Uí Chaoimh, Cork
Referee: Liam Gordon (Galway)
14 November
16:00
All-Ireland Qualifier Round 2

Tipperary	2–18 – 1–17	Cork
Jason Forde 1-6 (5fs), Michael Breen 0-5, Jake Morris 1-0, Seamus Callanan, Dan McCormack, and Paul Flynn 0-2 each, Willie Connors 0-1.	Report Brian Hogan; Cathal Barrett, Ronan Maher, Alan Flynn; Niall O’Meara, Brendan Maher, Padraic Maher; Noel McGrath, Michael Breen; Dan McCormack, John McGrath, Patrick Maher; Jason Forde, Seamus Callanan (c), Jake Morris; Subs: Willie Connors for J McGrath (33), Paul Flynn for P Maher (53), Paddy Cadell for N McGrath (59), Dillon Quirke for Forde (70+3).	Patrick Horgan 1-8 (7fs, 165), Seamus Harnedy 0-4, Tim O’Mahony, Bill Cooper, Shane Kingston, Robbie O’Flynn, and Declan Dalton 0-1 each.

Gaelic Grounds, Limerick
Referee: James Owens (Wexford)
21 November
13:15
All-Ireland Quarter-Final

Tipperary	2–24 – 3–23	Galway
Jason Forde 0-6 (5f), Noel McGrath 0-4, Seamus Callanan 1-2 (1f), Patrick Maher 1-0, McCormack 0-2, Alan Flynn 0-2, Michael Breen 0-2, Jake Morris 0-1, Niall O’Meara 0-1, Ronan Maher 0-1(1f), Brian Hogan 0-1 (1f), Barry Heffernan 0-1, Willie Connors 0-1	Report Brian Hogan; Cathal Barrett, Ronan Maher, Brendan Maher; Barry Heffernan, Pádraic Maher, Niall O’Meara; Alan Flynn, Michael Breen; Dan McCormack, Noel McGrath, Patrick Maher; Jason Forde, Seamus Callanan (c), Jake Morris; Subs: Willie Connors for Patrick Maher (50), John McGrath for Noel McGrath (53), Paddy Cadell for Niall O’Meara (58), Paul Flynn for Jason Forde (65), Mark Kehoe for Dan McCormack (73)	Joe Canning 0-14 (12f, 1’sl), Cathal Mannion 1-3, Brian Concannon 1-0, Aidan Harte 1-0, Conor Cooney 0-1, Joseph Cooney 0-1, Johnny Coen 0-1, Sean Loftus 0-1, Jason Flynn 0-1, Conor Whelan 0-1

Gaelic Grounds, Limerick
Referee: Johnny Murphy (Limerick)

== 2021 ==
4 July
15:45
Munster Semi-Final

Tipperary	3–22 – 2–21	Clare
Jason Forde 1-8 (1-0 pen, 0-3 frees, 0-1 65, 0-1 s-cut); John O’Dwyer 0-4; Michael Breen, Seamus Callanan 1-1 each; Jake Morris 0-3; Dan McCormack, Alan Flynn 0-2 each; Ronan Maher, Willie Connors 0-1 each.	Report; Match Programme Barry Hogan; Padraic Maher, Cathal Barrett, Barry Heffernan; Seamus Kennedy, Brendan Maher, Ronan Maher; Noel McGrath, Dan McCormack; Michael Breen, Jason Forde, Seamus Callanan (c); Jake Morris, John McGrath, John O’Dwyer; Subs: Willie Connors for J McGrath (HT); Alan Flynn for N McGrath (48); Dillon Quirke for O’Dwyer (66).	Tony Kelly 1-9 (0-8 frees); Ian Galvin 1-3; Cathal Malone, Ryan Taylor 0-2 each; Aron Shanagher, Aidan McCarthy, David Reidy, Rory Hayes, Colm, Galvin, John Conlon 0-1 each.

Gaelic Grounds, Limerick
Referee: James Owens (Wexford)
18 July
16:15
Munster Final

Tipperary	3–21 – 2–29	Limerick
Jason Forde 0-11 (4f), John O’Dwyer 1-2, Jake Morris 1-2, Mark Kehoe 1-0, Ronan Maher, Seamus Kennedy, Michael Breen, Dan McCormack, Seamus Callanan Willie Connors all 0-1.	Report; Match Programme Barry Hogan; Cathal Barrett, Padraic Maher, Barry Heffernan; Brendan Maher, Seamus Kennedy, Ronan Maher; Dan McCormack, Alan Flynn; Michael Breen, Noel McGrath, Jake Morris; John O’Dwyer, Seamus Callanan (c), Jason Forde; Subs: Willie Connors for Alan Flynn (53), Mark Kehoe for Noel McGrath (55), Niall O’Meara for John O’Dwyer (56), Paddy Cadell for Dan McCormack (56), Brian McGrath for Barry Heffernan (59)	Seamus Flanagan 1-3, Aaron Gillane 0-6 (4f), Tom Morrissey 0-6 (1f), Peter Casey 0-5, Diarmaid Byrnes 0-4 (2f, 1 65), Kyle Hayes 1-0, Gearoid Hegarty 0-3, Cian Lynch 0-1, David Reidy 0-1,

Páirc Uí Chaoimh, Cork
Referee: Paud O’Dwyer (Carlow)
31 July
13:30
Quarter-Final

Tipperary	2–27 – 4–28	Waterford
J Forde (0-12, 0-7 frees, 0-2 ‘65s); S Callanan (2-0); J O’Dwyer (0-4); M Breen, R Maher (0-3 each); J McGrath (0-2); N McGrath, W Connors, M Kehoe (0-1 each).	Report Barry Hogan; C Barrett, P Maher, B Heffernan; P Cadell, B Maher, R Maher; A Flynn, D McCormack; M Breen, J Forde, N McGrath; S Callanan (c), J O’Dwyer, J Morris; Subs: S Kennedy for Heffernan (HT); M Kehoe for Morris (44); W Connors for McCormack (48); N O’Meara for O’Dwyer (53); J McGrath for Callanan (56).	Stephen Bennett (1-0 pen, 0-1 free), A Gleeson (0-2 sidelines), D Hutchinson (1-3 each); N Montgomery (1-2); J Barron (0-4), P Hogan (0-3); K Bennett, J Fagan, M Kiely (0-2 each); S McNulty, C Lyons, P Curran, C Dunford (0-1 each).

Páirc Uí Chaoimh, Cork
Referee: Colm Lyons (Cork).

== 2022 ==
17 April
14:00
Munster Championship Round 1

Waterford	2–24 – 2–20	Tipperary
Stephen Bennett 0-10 (all frees), Dessie Hutchinson 1-3, Patrick Curran 0-4, Michael Kiely 1-0, Jamie Barron 0-2, Austin Gleeson 0-2 (1 sideline), Shane McNulty 0-2, Jack Prendergast 0-1,	Report; Highlights Brian Hogan; Cathal Barrett, James Quigley, Craig Morgan; Dillon Quirke, Ronan Maher (c), Seamus Kennedy; Alan Flynn, Barry Heffernan; Conor Bowe, Noel McGrath, Michael Breen; Jason Forde, Mark Kehoe, Jake Morris; Subs: Patrick Maher for Conor Bowe (half-time), Dan McCormack for Alan Flynn (45), Conor Stakelum for Barry Heffernan (52), Ger Browne for Jason Forde (60), John McGrath for Michael Breen (66)	Mark Kehoe 2-0, Noel McGrath 0-6 (2f), Jason Forde 0-4 (4f), Jake Morris 0-2, Michael Breen 0-2, Dan McCormack 0-2, Barry Heffernan 0-1, Conor Bowe 0-1, Conor Stakelum 0-1, Brian Hogan 0-1 (f),

Walsh Park, Waterford
Referee: Johnny Murphy (Limerick)
24 April
14:00
Munster Championship Round 2

Tipperary	2–16 – 3–21	Clare
Jason Forde 0-7 (5 frees, 1 65, 1 s-cut); Ger Browne 1-3; Barry Heffernan 1-0; Ronan Maher 0-2 (1 free); Cathal Barrett, Noel McGrath, Michael Breen, Mark Kehoe 0-1 each.	Report; Highlights Brian Hogan; Cathal Barrett, James Quigley, Craig Morgan; Dillon Quirke, Ronan Maher (c), Seamus Kennedy; Dan McCormack, Barry Heffernan; Jake Morris, Noel McGrath, Michael Breen; Jason Forde, Mark Kehoe, John McGrath Subs: Ger Browne for J McGrath (23 inj); Brian McGrath for Quigley (27 inj); Conor Stakelum for McCormack (HT); Gearoid O’Connor for Morris (49); Alan Flynn for Heffernan (65).	Tony Kelly 1-7 (1-0 pen, 0-5 frees); Peter Duggan, Ian Galvin 1-2 each; Ryan Taylor, Shane O’Donnell, Robyn Mounsey 0-2 each; Rory Hayes, Diarmuid Ryan, David McInerney, David Fitzgerald 0-1 each.

Semple Stadium
Referee: James Owens (Wexford)
8 May
14:00
Munster Championship Round 3

Limerick	3–21 – 0-23	Tipperary
A. Gillane (2-5, 0-4 frees); T. Morrissey (0-5); D. Byrnes (0-3, frees, 1 65); C. Boylan (1-0); D. O’Donovan (0-2); C. O’Neill, G. Mulcahy, G. Hegarty, B. Nash, D. Reidy, D. Hannon (0-1 each).	Report; Highlights Barry Hogan; C. Barrett, R. Maher (c), C. Morgan; P. Cadell, S. Kennedy, B. Heffernan; D. Quirke, C Stakelum; M. Breen, N. McGrath, G. Browne; J. Morris, M. Kehoe, P. Flynn. Subs: R. Byrne for P. Cadell (35); C. Bowe for P. Flynn (48); D. McCormack for G. Browne (64); A. Flynn for C. Stakelum (69).	N. McGrath (0-13, 9 frees, 2 65s, 1 sideline); G. Browne, J. Morris (0-3 each); M. Kehoe, B. Heffernan, A. Flynn, R. Byrnes (0-1 each).

Gaelic Grounds, Limerick
Referee: Liam Gordon (Galway)
22 May
16:00
Munster Championship Round 4

Tipperary	1–24 – 3-30	Cork
N. McGrath (0-13, 12 frees); J. Morris (1-2); J. Forde (0-5); C. Stakelum, D. Quirke, R. Maher (free), P. Maher (0-1 each).	Report; Highlights Barry Hogan; C. Barrett, R. Maher (c), C. Morgan; D. Quirke, S. Kennedy, B. Heffernan; C. Stakelum, D. McCormack; M. Breen, N. McGrath, G. Browne; J. Forde, M. Kehoe, J. Morris. Subs: A. Flynn for B. Heffernan, P. Maher for G. Browne (both h-t); J. Quigley for C. Barrett (inj 40); C. Bowe for M. Breen (47); G. O’Connor for D. McCormack (69).	C. Lehane (0-8, 1 free); P. Horgan (0-5, 3 frees, 1 65); A. Connolly, T. O’Mahony (1-1 each); D. Fitzgibbon (1-0 each); S. Kingston (0-4); R. O’Flynn, M. Coleman (1 free), S Harnedy (0-3 each); J. O’Connor (0-2).

Semple Stadium
Referee: S. Stack (Dublin)

== 2023 ==
23 April
16:00
Munster Championship Round 1

Clare	3–23 – 5–22	Tipperary
Aidan McCarthy 1-13 (7fs, 2’65), Mark Rodgers 2-0, Ryan Taylor, Ian Galvin, Shane Meehan 0-2 each, Diarmuid Ryan, Tony Kelly, John Conlon, Robin Mounsey 0-1 each.	Report; Highlights Barry Hogan; Michael Breen, Cathal Barrett, Johnny Ryan; Brian McGrath, Ronan Maher, Bryan O’Mara; Dan McCormack, Alan Tynan; Seamus Kennedy, Noel McGrath (c), Gearoid O’Connor; Jake Morris, John McGrath, Jason Forde; Subs: Conor Stakelum for Tynan (45), Mark Kehoe for J. McGrath (58), Sean Ryan for O’Connor (63), Conor Bowe for N. McGrath (71), Enda Heffernan for B. McGrath (73)	Jason Forde 2-6 (1-0 Pen, 5fs, 1-1 sideline), Jake Morris 2-4, Sean Ryan 1-1, Noel McGrath 0-3, Gearoid O’Connor 0-2, Brian McGrath, Alan Tynan, John McGrath, Mark Kehoe, Seamus Kennedy, Conor Bowe 0-1 each.

Cusack Park, Ennis
Referee: Thomas Walsh (Waterford)
6 May
19:00
Munster Championship Round 2

Cork	4–19 – 2–25	Tipperary
Patrick Horgan 0-8 (5f, 2 65); Declan Dalton 1-2 (0-2f); Darragh Fitzgibbon 1-1; Robbie O'Flynn, Brian Hayes 1-0 each; Séamus Harnedy, Shane Kingston 0-3 each; Conor Lehane, Tim O’Mahony 0-1 each.	Report; Highlights Barry Hogan; Michael Breen, Cathal Barrett, Johnny Ryan; Bryan O’Mara, Ronan Maher, Dan McCormack; Séamus Kennedy, Conor Stakelum; Alan Tynan, Noel McGrath (c), Gearóid O’Connor; Jason Forde, Jake Morris, Seán Ryan; Subs: Mark Kehoe for Forde (16 inj), Conor Bowe for S Ryan (h-t), John McGrath for O’Connor (53), Enda Heffernan for Stakelum (63), Séamus Callanan for Bowe (69).	Mark Kehoe 1-4; Gearóid O’Connor 1-3 (0-3f); Alan Tynan, Jason Forde (3f) 0-4 each; Séamus Kennedy, Jake Morris 0-3 each; Conor Stakelum, Noel McGrath, Seán Ryan, Séamus Callanan 0-1 each.

Páirc Uí Chaoimh, Cork
Referee: Paud O’Dwyer (Carlow)
21 May
16:00
Munster Championship Round 3

Tipperary	0–25 – 0–25	Limerick
Gearoid O’Connor 0-10 (9fs), Jake Morris 0-4, Mark Kehoe 0-3, Conor Bowe 0-3, Noel McGrath 0-2, Seamus Callanan, Rhys Shelly, John McGrath 0-1 each	Report; Highlights Rhys Shelly; Cathal Barrett, Michael Breen, Ronan Maher; Eoghan Connolly, Bryan O’Mara, Seamus Kennedy; Alan Tynan, Dan McCormack; Connor Stakelum, Patrick Maher, Noel McGrath (c); Jake Morris, Gearoid O’Connor, Mark Kehoe. Subs: Seamus Callanan for P Maher (12, blood sub - reversed after 14); Seamus Callanan for Tynan (45); Conor Bowe for P Maher (52); Brian McGrath for Barrett (60); Johnny Ryan for Stakelum (69); Sean Ryan for Gearoid O’Connor (69); John McGrath for N McGrath (75).	Aaron Gillane 0-6 (3fs) Cathal O’Neill 0-5, Diarmuid Byrnes 0-4 (3fs), Tom Morrissey 0-4, Seamus Flanagan, Graeme Mulcahy 0-2 each, Peter Casey, Declan Hannon 0-1 each

Semple Stadium, Thurles
Referee: Sean Stack (Dublin)
28 May
16:00
Munster Championship Round 4

Tipperary	0–21 – 1–24	Waterford
Noel McGrath 0-7 (all frees); Seamus Callanan 0-3, Gearoid O’Connor 0-4 (0-3 frees); Ronan Maher 0-2, Brian McGrath 0-1, Alan Tynan 0-1, Mark Kehoe 0-1, Conor Bowe 0-1, Seamus Kennedy 0-1.	Report; Highlights Rhys Shelly; Brian McGrath, Michael Breen, Ronan Maher; Eoghan Connolly, Bryan O’Mara, Seamus Kennedy; Dan McCormack, Alan Tynan; Conor Stakelum, Patrick Maher, Noel McGrath (c); Seamus Callanan, Gearoid O’Connor, Mark Kehoe; Subs: Conor Bowe for Gearoid O’Connor (25 mins); Johnny Ryan for Brian McGrath (temp 44 mins, reversed 50 mins); Sean Ryan for Conor Stakelum (55 mins; John McGrath for Patrick Maher (60 mins); Joe Fogarty for Mark Kehoe (67 mins).	Stephen Bennett 0-8 (0-7 frees); Dessie Hutchinson 1-4, Jack Fagan 0-4, Neil Montgomery 0-2, Patrick Fitzgerald 0-2, Billy Nolan 0-1, Darragh Lyons 0-1, Peter Hogan 0-1, Patrick Curran 0-1.

Semple Stadium, Thurles
Referee: John Keenan (Wicklow)
17 June
16:00
All-Ireland Preliminary Quarter-final

Offaly	3–18 – 7–38	Tipperary
E Cahill 1-7 (1-0 pen, 5fs); C Kiely 1-3 (1-1 fs); C Mitchell 1-1; J Sampson 0-2; B Duignan, P Clancy, L Langton, J Murphy, P Delaney 0-1 each.	Report; Highlights R Shelly; E Connolly, M Breen, C Morgan; D McCormack, R Maher, B O‘Mara; A Tynan, N McGrath (c); S Kennedy, J Forde, C Stakelum; M Kehoe, S Callanan, J Morris; Subs: J Ryan for Morgan (inj 47), E Heffernan for Maher & J Campion for N McGrath (47); G O’Connor for Callanan (53); J McGrath for Kennedy (61).	J Forde 2-11 (4 fs, 3 65s); M Kehoe 3-3; J Morris 0-7; C Stakelum 0-6; J McGrath 1-1; S Callanan 1-0; A Tynan 0-3; N McGrath 0-2; E Connolly, B O’Mara, D McCormack, S Kennedy, J Campion 0-1 each

Glenisk O'Connor Park, Tullamore
Referee: Johnny Murphy (Limerick)
24 June
18:15
All-Ireland Quarter-final

Galway	1–20 – 1–18	Tipperary
Evan Niland 0-8 (7fs), Conor Whelan 1-4, Tom Monaghan 0-3, Cianan Fahy 0-2, Daithí Burke, Joseph Cooney, Ronan Glennon 0-1 each.	Report; Highlights Rhys Shelly; Michael Breen, Eoghan Connolly, Dan McCormack; Bryan O’Mara, Ronan Maher, Cathal Barrett; Conor Stakelum, Alan Tynan; Séamus Kennedy, Jason Forde, Noel McGrath (c); Jake Morris, Séamus Callanan, Mark Kehoe; Subs: Gearóid O’Connor for Callanan (HT), Conor Bowe for Kehoe (HT), Johnny Ryan for Stakelum (50), John McGrath for N McGrath (53), Jack Ryan for Tynan (70+1).	Jason Forde 0-10 (8fs), John McGrath 1-0, Alan Tynan, Séamus Kennedy 0-2 each, Michael Breen, Ronan Maher, Gearóid O’Connor, Johnny Ryan 0-1 each.

Gaelic Grounds, Limerick
Referee: John Keenan (Wicklow)

== 2024 ==
28 April
16:00
Munster Championship Round 1

Limerick	2–27 – 0–18	Tipperary
A. Gillane (1-8, 0-6 frees); P. Casey (1-2); A. English (0-4); T. Morrissey, C. O’Neill (0-3 each); D. Reidy, D. Byrnes (frees) (0-2 each); K. Hayes, W. O’Donoghue, D. Ó Dalaigh (0-1 each)	Report; Highlights Barry. Hogan; J. Ryan, C. Morgan, R. Maher (c); C. Bowe, B. O’Mara, M. Breen; W. Connors, E. Connolly; A. Tynan, G. O’Connor, J. Forde; S. Hayes, J. Morris, M. Kehoe; Subs: N. McGrath for S. Hayes (h-t); P. Maher for M. Kehoe (42); A. Ormond for W. Connors (50); D. Stakelum for J. Morris (59); S. Kenneally for J. Forde (70).	J. Forde (0-9, 8 frees); M. Kehoe, G. O’Connor (1 free) (0-2 each); E. Connolly, A. Tynan, P. Maher, N. McGrath, J. Ryan (0-1 each).

Gaelic Grounds, Limerick
Referee: L. Gordon (Galway)
4 May
18:00
Munster Championship Round 2

Waterford	3–21 – 1–27	Tipperary
Stephen Bennett 2-3 (1-0 pen); Dessie Hutchinson 0-6 (3f); Jack Prendergast 1-1; Calum Lyons 0-3; Patrick Curran 0-2; Kieran Bennett, Darragh Lyons, Neil Montgomery, Michael Kiely, Jack Fagan, Shane Bennett 0-1 each.	Report; Highlights Barry Hogan; Cathal Barrett, Michael Breen, Craig Morgan; Conor Bowe, Ronan Maher (c), Bryan O’Mara; Eoghan Connolly, Alan Tynan; Noel McGrath, Gearóid O’Connor, Darragh Stakelum; Jake Morris, Mark Kehoe, Jason Forde; Subs: Patrick Maher for Forde (51), Willie Connors for Connolly (54), John McGrath for Noel McGrath (56), Seánie Kenneally for Stakelum (64), Dan McCormack for O’Mara (68).	Sean Kenneally 1-1; Gearóid O’Connor (3f), Mark Kehoe 0-4 each; Jason Forde (2f), Jake Morris 0-3 each; Ronan Maher (1f), Eoghan Connolly, Alan Tynan, Noel McGrath 0-2 each; Michael Breen, Darragh Stakelum, Patrick Maher, John McGrath 0-1 each.

Walsh Park, Waterford
Referee: James Owens (Wexford).
19 May
16:00
Munster Championship Round 3

Tipperary	1–21 – 4–30	Cork
J. Forde (0-5, 3 frees); M. Kehoe (1-0); J. Morris, J. McGrath (frees) (0-3 each); G. O’Connor, D. Stakelum N. McGrath (0-2 each); A. Tynan, R. Maher (free), C. Bowe, S. Hayes (0-1 each).	Report; Highlights Barry Hogan; C. Barrett, M. Breen, C. Morgan; B. O’Mara, R. Maher (c), C. Bowe; A. Tynan, E. Connolly; G. O’Connor, N. McGrath, J. Forde; J. Morris, D. Stakelum, M. Kehoe; Subs: P. Cadell for R. Maher (temp, 32-ht); C. Stakelum for E. Connolly (h-t); D. McCormack for C. Barrett (inj 42); J. McGrath for J. Forde (43); P. Maher for D. Stakelum (48); S. Hayes for G. O’Connor (56).	P. Horgan (1-9, 0-5 frees); A. Connolly (3-1); S. Kingston (0-4); D. Fitzgibbon, S. Harnedy (0-3 each); S. Barrett, B. Hayes, R. Downey (0-2 each); N. O’Leary, D. Dalton, C. Lehane, L. Meade (0-1 each)

Semple Stadium, Thurles
Referee: T. Walsh (Waterford)
26 May
16:00
Munster Championship Round 4

Tipperary	0–24 – 1–24	Clare
Jake Morris 0-11 (7fs), Seanie Kenneally 0-3, Ronan Maher 0-2 (1f), Eoghan Connolly and Gearoid O’Connor (2fs) 0-2 each, Barry Heffernan, Alan Tynan, Noel McGrath, and Bryan O’Mara 0-1 each.	Report; Highlights Barry Hogan; J Ryan, E Connolly, C Morgan; B McGrath, R Maher, B Heffernan; P Cadell, W Connors; A Tynan, J Morris, S Kenneally; G O’Connor, M Kehoe, A Ormond; Subs: D Stakelum for O’Connor (28); B O’Mara for B Heffernan (43); N McGrath for Cadell (44); C Stakelum for Ormond (52); Patrick Maher for Kehoe (56).	Aidan McCarthy 0-9 (6fs), Diarmuid Ryan 1-1, David Fitzgerald 0-3, Mark Rodgers 0-3 (2fs), Shane O’Donnell and Tony Kelly 0-2 each, Darragh Lohan, Peter Duggan, David Reidy, Ian Galvin 0-1 each.

Semple Stadium, Thurles
Referee: Johnny Murphy (Waterford)

== 2025 ==
20 April
16:00
2025 Munster Senior Hurling Championship Round 1

Tipperary	2–23 – 2–23	Limerick
D McCarthy (0-8, 0-5 frees); J McGrath (2-1); E Connolly (0-4 frees), J Morris (0-4 each); B O’Mara, C Morgan, A Tynan, J Forde, S Kennedy, N McGrath (0-1 each)	Report; Highlights Barry Hogan; E Connolly, R Doyle, M Breen; J Caesar, R Maher (c), B O’Mara; C Morgan, S O’Farrell; A Tynan, J Morris, D Stakelum; J McGrath, J Forde, D McCarthy; Subs: N McGrath for Caesar (42); C Bowe for Forde (51); S Kennedy for D Stakelum (52); C Stakelum for Tynan (68); S Kenneally for J McGrath (70).	A Gillane (0-7, 0-4 frees); S O’Brien (1-4); A English (1-2); D Byrnes (0-3, 0-2 frees); K Hayes (0-2); C Coughlan, B Nash, C Lynch, G Hegarty, T Morrissey (0-1 each).

Semple Stadium, Thurles
Referee: T Walsh (Waterford)
27 April
16:00
2025 Munster Senior Hurling Championship Round 2

Cork	4–27 – 0–24	Tipperary
Patrick Horgan 1-9 (6fs), Declan Dalton 1-6 (2fs), Séamus Harnedy 0-5, Tim O’Mahony, Alan Connolly 1-0 each, Darragh Fitzgibbon, Brian Hayes, Robbie O’Flynn 0-2 each, Tommy O’Connell 0-1	Report; Highlights Barry Hogan; Eoghan Connolly, Robert Doyle, Michael Breen; Sam O’Farrell, Ronan Maher (c), Bryan O’Mara; Craig Morgan, Alan Tynan; Conor Bowe, Jake Morris, Darragh Stakelum; Darragh McCarthy, John McGrath, Jason Forde; Subs: Andrew Ormond for Bowe (42), Noel McGrath for Stakelum (42), Séamus Kennedy for Tynan (46), Gearóid O’Connor for J McGrath (51), Willie Connors for O’Farrell (67).	Jason Forde 0-15 (12fs), Jake Morris 0-3, Willie Connors 0-2, Eoghan Connolly, Craig Morgan, Darragh Stakelum, Andrew Ormond 0-1 each.

Páirc Uí Chaoimh
Referee: Johnny Murphy (Limerick)
10 May
18:00
2025 Munster Senior Hurling Championship Round 3

Clare	2–21 – 4–18	Tipperary
M Rodgers (1-13, 0-13 frees); T Kelly (1-1, 1-0 pen, 0-1 free); S Rynne (0-3); R Taylor (0-2); C Malone, P Duggan (0-1 each).	Report; Highlights R Shelly; M Breen, B O’Mara, E Connolly; R Maher (c), C Morgan, R Doyle; S O’Farrell, A Tynan; C Stakelum, A Ormond, N McGrath; J Forde, J McGrath, J Morris; Sub: O O’Donoghue for Stakelum (47); S Kennedy for Maher (55-59, temporary); W Connors for N McGrath (58); S Kennedy for O’Farrell (62); D Stakelum for Tynan (63); S Kenneally for Forde (66).	John McGrath (2-3); J Forde (0-8, 0-6 frees, 0-1 ‘65); A Ormond (2-1); E Connolly (0-3, 0-2 frees); J Morris (0-2); S Kenneally (0-1).

Cusack Park
Referee: J Owens (Wexford).
18 May
14:00
2025 Munster Senior Hurling Championship Round 4

Tipperary	1–30 – 1–21	Waterford
Darragh McCarthy 0-11 (11fs), Oisín O’Donoghue 1-1, Jake Morris 0-4, Eoghan Connolly (2fs), Andrew Ormond, Jason Forde (2s/l) 0-3 each, John McGrath 0-2, Sam O’Farrell, Noel McGrath, Seán Kenneally 0-1 each.	Report; Highlights Rhys Shelly; Robert Doyle, Michael Breen, Eoghan Connolly; Bryan O’Mara, Craig Morgan, Ronan Maher (c); Sam O’Farrell, Willie Connors; Conor Stakelum, Andrew Ormond, Jake Morris; Darragh McCarthy, John McGrath, Jason Forde; Subs: Darragh Stakelum for Connors (47-52, temp), Noel McGrath for C Stakelum (51), D Stakelum for O’Farrell (52), Seán Kenneally for J McGrath (57), Oisín O’Donoghue for Forde (68), Séamus Kennedy for Morgan (70).	Stephen Bennett 1-9 (7fs), Jamie Barron 0-4, Michael Kiely 0-2, Paddy Leavey, Darragh Lyons (s/l), Kevin Mahony, Dessie Hutchinson, Patrick Fitzgerald, Seán Walsh 0-1 each.

Semple Stadium, Thurles
Referee: Seán Stack (Dublin)
14 June
13:45
2025 All-Ireland Senior Hurling Championship Preliminary Quarter-final

Laois	0-18 – 3–32	Tipperary
Tomás Keyes 0-9 (6fs), Paddy Purcell 0-4, James Keyes 0-1, Pádraig Delaney 0-1, Jordan Walshe 0-1, Donnacha Hartnett 0-1, Aaron Dunphy 0-1.	Report; Highlights Rhys Shelly; Michael Breen, Bryan O’Mara, Robert Doyle; Craig Morgan, Ronan Maher (c), Séamus Kennedy; Willie Connors, Joe Caesar; Alan Tynan, Andrew Ormond, Sam O’Farrell; Jason Forde, John McGrath, Darragh McCarthy; Subs: Johnny Ryan for Doyle (half-time), Oisín O’Donoghue for Ormond (47), Peter McGarry for Maher (47), Brian McGrath for Morgan (54), Joe Fogarty for McCarthy (55).	Jason Forde 2-5 (2fs), Darragh McCarthy 0-9 (6fs, 1 65), Willie Connors 0-5, Sam O’Farrell 1-1, John McGrath 0-3, Andrew Ormond 0-3, Alan Tynan 0-1, Robert Doyle 0-1, Joe Caesar 0-1, Oisín O’Donoghue 0-1, Joe Fogarty 0-1, Peter McGarry 0-1.

O'Moore Park
Referee: Chris Mooney (Dublin)
21 June
18:15
2025 All-Ireland Senior Hurling Championship Quarter-final

Galway	2-17 – 1–28	Tipperary
Cathal Mannion 0-13 (9fs, 2 65s), Colm Molloy and Declan McLoughlin 1-0 each, Tom Monaghan 0-2, Conor Cooney and Conor Whelan 0-1 each	Report; Highlights Rhys Shelly; Robert Doyle, Bryan O'Mara, Michael Breen; Craig Morgan, Eoghan Connolly, Ronan Maher (c); Willie Connors, Peter McGarry; Sam O'Farrell, Jake Morris, Andrew Ormond; John McGrath, Jason Forde, Darragh McCarthy; Subs: Darragh Stakelum for McGarry (HT), Noel McGrath for John McGrath (48), Oisín O'Donoghue for McCarthy (52), Conor Stakelum for O'Farrell (59), Séamus Kennedy for Connors (66).	Jason Forde 0-7 (1f, 2 sidelines), Jake Morris and Andrew Ormond 0-5 each, Oisín O'Donoghue 1-0, John McGrath and Darragh McCarthy (3fs) 0-3 each, Darragh Stakelum 0-2, Sam O'Farrell, Willie Connors, and Noel McGrath 0-1 each.

Gaelic Grounds
Referee: Seán Stack (Dublin).
6 July
16:00
2025 All-Ireland Senior Hurling Championship Semi-final

Kilkenny	0-30 – 4–20	Tipperary
TJ Reid 0-11 (8fs, 1 65), Martin Keoghan 0-6, Jordan Molloy 0-4, Cian Kenny, Adrian Mullen, Billy Ryan, and Eoin Cody 0-2 each, John Donnelly 0-1	Report; Highlights Rhys Shelly; Michael Breen, Ronan Maher (c), Robert Doyle; Bryan O'Mara, Eoghan Connolly, Craig Morgan; Willie Connors, Conor Stakelum; Jake Morris, Andrew Ormond, Sam O'Farrell; Darragh McCarthy, John McGrath, Jason Forde; Subs: Alan Tynan for Ormond (28-31 mins), Noel McGrath for J McGrath (50), Alan Tynan for O'Farrell (53), Darragh Stakelum for Connors (57), Oisín O'Donoghue for C Stakelum (63), Seán Kenneally for Ormond (70+1).	Jason Forde 1-5 (4fs), John McGrath and Darragh McCarthy (2fs) 1-2 each, Jake Morris 0-4, Oisín O'Donoghue 1-0, Eoghan Connolly and Conor Stakelum 0-3 each, Sam O'Farrell 0-1

Croke Park
Referee: James Owens (Wexford).
20 July
15:30
2025 All-Ireland Senior Hurling Championship Final

Tipperary	3-27 – 1–18	Cork
Darragh McCarthy 1-13 (0-9f, 1-0 pen), John McGrath 2-2, Jake Morris 0-2, Jason Forde 0-2, Andrew Ormond 0-2, Eoghan Connolly 0-1, Robert Doyle 0-1, Willie Connors 0-1, Conor Stakelum 0-1, Rhys Shelly 0-1, Noel McGrath 0-1.	Report 1 Report 2 Highlights Rhys Shelly; Ronan Maher (c), Robert Doyle, Michael Breen; Bryan O’Mara; Eoghan Connolly, Craig Morgan; Willie Connors, Conor Stakelum; Andrew Ormond, Jake Morris, Sam O’Farrell; Darragh McCarthy, John McGrath, Jason Forde; Subs:Seamus Kennedy for O’Mara 50, Alan Tynan for Morgan 56, Noel McGrath for O’Farrell 60, Darragh Stakelum for Conor Stakelum 65, Oisin O’Donoghue for Ormond 66.	Shane Barrett 1-4, Patrick Horgan 0-4 (0-3f), Diarmuid Healy 0-3, Darragh Fitzgibbon 0-2, Brian Hayes 0-1, Alan Connolly 0-1, Declan Dalton 0-1 (0-1f), Niall O’Leary 0-1, Seamus Harnedy 0-1.

Croke Park
Referee: Liam Gordon (Galway)

== 2026 ==
19 April
16:00
2026 Munster Senior Hurling Championship Round 1

Tipperary	1–22 – 0–29	Cork
Jason Forde 0-7 (7fs); Darragh McCarthy 0-4 (4fs); Alan Tynan 1-0; Eoghan Connolly (2f), Oisín O’Donoghue, Jake Morris 0-2 each; Willie Connors, Conor Stakelum, John McGrath, Sam O’Farrell, Darragh Stakelum 0-1 each.	Report; Highlights Rhys Shelly; Michael Breen, Robert Doyle, Ronan Maher (c); Craig Morgan, Eoghan Connolly, Bryan O’Mara; Willie Connors, Conor Stakelum; Jake Morris, Andrew Ormond, Oisín O’Donoghue; Stefan Tobin, John McGrath, Jason Forde; Subs: Darragh McCarthy for Tobin (h-t), Noel McGrath for J McGrath (41), Alan Tynan for Stakelum (46), Darragh Stakelum for Forde (54), Sam O’Farrell for Connors (58).	Alan Connolly 0-7 (5fs); William Buckley 0-6 (1f); Darragh Fitzgibbon, Shane Barrett, Barry Walsh 0-4 each; Tim O’Mahony 0-2 (1f); Brian Hayes, Alan Walsh 0-1 each.

Semple Stadium, Thurles
Referee: Seán Stack (Dublin).
26 April
16:00
2026 Munster Senior Hurling Championship Round 2

Waterford	3–24 – 1–30	Tipperary
Stephen Bennett (1-10; 0-7f; 0-1 ‘65); Kevin Mahony (1-2); Jamie Barron (1-1); Calum Lyons (0-3); Dessie Hutchinson and Sean Walsh (0-2 each); Billy Nolan (0-1; 0-1f); Jack Fagan, Jack Prendergast and Sean Mackey (0-1 each)	Report; Highlights Rhys Shelly; Robert Doyle, Eoghan Connolly, Michael Breen; Oisin O’Donoghue, Ronan Maher (c), Bryan O’Mara; Willie Connors, Seamus Kennedy; Jake Morris, Andrew Ormond, Sam O’Farrell; Darragh McCarthy, John McGrath, Alan Tynan. Subs: Craig Morgan for Seamus Kennedy (46); Noel McGrath for Alan Tynan (48); Darragh Stakelum for Sam O’Farrell (49); Stefan Tobin for Andrew Ormond (55); Alan Tynan for Noel McGrath (57); Jason Forde for Darragh McCarthy (59); Peter McGarry for Willie Connors (66)	Darragh McCarthy (0-5; 4f); Andrew Ormond (1-1); John McGrath (0-4); Oisín O'Donoghue 0-4, Eoghan Connolly (0-4; 0-2f; 0-1 ‘65); Jake Morris 0-3, Stefan Tobin and Ronan Maher (0-2 each); Alan Tynan, Willie Connors, Sam O'Farrell, Jason Forde and Darragh Stakelum (0-1 each)

Walsh Park, Waterford
Referee: Chris Mooney (Dublin)
16 May
19:00
2026 Munster Senior Hurling Championship Round 3

Tipperary	0–17 – 1–25	Clare
Jake Morris 0-4; Eoghan Connolly (2f), Darragh McCarthy (3f), Jason Forde (1s/l) 0-3 each; Willie Connons, Alan Tynan, Conor Stakelum, Stefan Tobin 0-1 each.	Report; Highlights Rhys Shelly; Michael Breen, Bryan O’Mara, Ronan Maher (c); Eoghan Connolly, Robert Doyle, Craig Morgan; Willie Connors, Alan Tynan; Andrew Ormond, Jake Morris, Oisín O’Donoghue; Darragh McCarthy, John McGrath, Jason Forde; Subs: Darragh Stakelum for Ormond (h-t), Conor Stakelum for Breen (42), Sam O’Farrell for Tynan (48), Stefan Tobin for McCarthy (51), Noel McGrath for Forde (57), Keith Ryan for O’Donoghue (66-f-t, temp).	Diarmuid Stritch 0-6; Ian Galvin 1-2; Tony Kelly 0-5 (4f); Peter Duggan (2s/l, 1f), Seán Rynne 0-4 each; Cathal Malone 0-2; Niall O’Farrell, Ryan Taylor 0-1 each.

Semple Stadium, Thurles
Referee: Thomas Walsh (Waterford)
24 May
16:00
2026 Munster Senior Hurling Championship Round 4

Limerick	5–27 – 0–25	Tipperary
Aidan O’Connor (2-7; 1-0 ’65, 0-5 frees); Aaron Gillane (2-0); Diarmaid Byrnes (1-3; 1-0 pen, 0-2 frees); Tom Morrissey (0-4); Gearoid Hegarty, Cathal O’Neill, Cian Lynch, Shane O’Brien (0-2 each); Adam English, Peter Casey, Mike Casey, Darragh O’Donovan, Barry Nash (0-1 each)	Report; Highlights Rhys Shelly; Robert Doyle, Ronan Maher (c), Keith Ryan; Eoghan Connolly, Bryan O’Mara, Séamus Kennedy; Conor Stakelum, Alan Tynan; Oisin O’Donoghue, Jake Morris, Noel McGrath; Darragh McCarthy, John McGrath, Stefan Tobin; Subs: Sam O’Farrell for Tynan (42); Joe Caesar for Kennedy (45); Michael Breen for N McGrath (51); Paddy McCormack for J McGrath (54); Jamie Ormond for McCarthy (61); Brian McGrath for K Ryan (temp 68 – full-time)	Darragh McCarthy (0-7 frees); Eoghan Connolly (0-4; 0-2 frees); Conor Stakelum, Stefan Tobin, Jake Morris (0-3 each); Noel McGrath (0-2); Ronan Maher, Paddy McCormack, Sam O’Farrell (0-1 each).

Gaelic Grounds, Limerick
Referee: Colm Lyons (Cork)
