= Munster Senior Hurling Championship =

Annual inter-county hurling competition

Munster GAA Hurling Senior Championship
- Current season or competition: 2026 Munster Senior Hurling Championship
- Irish: Craobh Iomána na Mumhan
- Code: Hurling
- Founded: 1888; 138 years ago
- Region: Munster (GAA)
- Trophy: Mick Mackey Cup
- No. of teams: 5
- Title holders: Limerick (26th title)
- Most titles: Cork (55 titles)
- Sponsors: Centra, Littlewoods Ireland, Bord Gáis Energy
- TV partner(s): RTÉ; GAA Go
- Motto: Be there. All the way.
- Official website: Official website

The Munster GAA Hurling Senior Championship, known simply as the Munster Championship, is an annual inter-county hurling competition organised by the Munster Council of the Gaelic Athletic Association (GAA). It is the highest inter-county hurling competition in the province of Munster, and has been contested every year since the 1888 championship.

The final, currently held on the first weekend in June, serves as the culmination of a series of games played between April and May, and the results determine which team receives the Mick Mackey Cup. The championship was previously played on a straight knockout basis whereby once a team lost they were eliminated from the championship; however, as of 2018, the championship involved a round-robin system.

The Munster Championship is an integral part of the wider GAA Hurling All-Ireland Senior Championship. The winners of the Munster final, like their counterparts in the Leinster Championship, are rewarded by advancing directly to the semi-final stage of the All-Ireland series of games. The losers of the Munster final currently enter the All-Ireland series at the quarter-final stage, while the third-placed team advances to the quarter-finals. Each year, the lowest finishing team is possibly relegated to the Joe McDonagh Cup, though this has yet to happen.

Five teams currently participate in the Munster Championship. Seven teams have competed since the inception of the Munster Championship in 1888.

The title has been won at least once by all six of the Munster counties, five of which have won the title more than once. The all-time record-holders are Cork, who have won the championship on 55 occasions. Limerick have won the most championships in succession, winning six Mick Mackey cups between 2019 and 2024. Limerick are the current title holders, defeating Cork in the 2026 Final.

== History ==
=== Development ===
Following the foundation of the Gaelic Athletic Association in 1884, new rules for Gaelic football and hurling were drawn up and published in the United Irishman newspaper. In 1886, county committees began to be established, with several counties affiliating over the next few years. The GAA ran its inaugural All-Ireland Senior Hurling Championship in 1887. The decision to establish that first championship was influenced by several factors. Firstly, inter-club contests in 1885 and 1886 were wildly popular and began to draw huge crowds. Clubs started to travel across the country to play against each other and these matches generated intense interest as the newspapers began to speculate which teams might be considered the best in the country. Secondly, although the number of clubs was growing, many were slow to affiliate to the Association, leaving it short of money. Establishing a central championship held the prospect of enticing GAA clubs to process their affiliations, just as the establishment of the FA Cup had done much in the 1870s to promote the development of the Football Association in England. The championships were open to all affiliated clubs who would first compete in county-based competitions, to be run by local county committees. The winners of each county championship would then proceed to represent that county in the All-Ireland series. For the first and only time in its history the All-Ireland Championship used an open draw format. Six teams entered the first championship, however, this number increased to nine in 1888. Because of this, and in an effort to reduce travelling costs, the GAA decided to introduce provincial championships in Leinster and Munster.

=== Beginnings ===
The inaugural Munster Championship featured Clare, Cork, Limerick, Tipperary and Waterford. Cork and Tipperary contested the first match on Sunday 27 May 1888. Despite losing, Cork advanced to the Munster semi-final as Tipperary champions Clonoulty used players from other clubs to supplement their team. Such a format was not yet allowed. A replay was ordered in Cork but Clonoulty refused to play anywhere in Cork stating a preference for Kilmallock. As a result of their refusal to play they were disqualified. The inaugural Munster final between Cork and Clare was to be played on Wednesday 29 August 1888, however, the provincial showpiece ended in disarray. Clare champions Ogonelloe, who had received a walkover from South Liberties of Limerick in the semi-final, however, this was later disputed. Before the final commenced South Liberties took to the field to play Ogonelloe, with the winners competing in the final later that day. The officials decided then not to play either game. It was then decided to play the final in Cork on Sunday 2 September 1888, however, Clare refused to travel and Cork were awarded the title.

Postponements, disqualifications, objections, withdrawals and walkovers were regular occurrences during the initial years of the championship. Kerry became the sixth and final team to enter the championship in 1889, however, the championship ended without a final once again as Kerry conceded a walkover to Clare.

On Sunday 28 September 1890, the first Munster final took place. Cork won their first title on the field of play after a 2–00 to 0–01 defeat of Kerry. Since then the championship title has been awarded every year except in 1908 when Tipperary were awarded the title after being granted a walkover by Kerry.

=== Team changes ===
In spite of winning the Munster title in 1891, Kerry eventually became a county dominated by Gaelic football. Because of this the inter-county hurling team went into a sharp decline. Kerry's championship appearances were sporadic by the 1950s and the county eventually stopped fielding a team at senior level before regrading to the All-Ireland Junior Hurling Championship. After some successes in the All-Ireland Senior B Hurling Championship, Kerry returned to the Munster Championship after a nineteen-year absence in 1977. A decade later the team made a more permanent return to the championship, however, Kerry only recorded one championship victory from then until their last appearance in the championship in 2004.

Due to a lack of competition in the Connacht Championship, the Galway County Board proposed a regrading to the junior championship in January 1958. This led to a wider debate regarding the structure of the championship. The abolition of the provincial system and the introduction of an open draw was rejected. Galway put forward their own proposal for the creation of a new "province" consisting of Galway, Clare, Laois, Offaly and Westmeath, however, this was also rejected. The possibility of starting the National Hurling League in April in an effort to give Galway some game time before the start of the championship was also discussed. At a meeting of the Munster Council on 10 January 1959 it was decided to invite Galway to participate in all grades of hurling in Munster on a temporary basis. This decision was later ratified at the GAA Congress. Galway played in the Munster Championship from 1959 until 1969, however, during that time they won just one of their twelve championship games.

=== Team dominance ===
==== Summary of champions ====
#	County	Titles	Runners-up	Total
1	Cork	55	31	86
2	Tipperary	42	28	70
3	Limerick	26	28	54
4	Waterford	9	21	30
5	Clare	6	25	31
6	Kerry	1	5	6

Since the beginning, the championship has been dominated by Cork and Tipperary. They have won a combined total of 96 of the 135 championship titles. The two teams began their hegemony by winning 18 championship titles between 1890 and 1909 with Cork setting a number of records during this time — becoming the first team to win successive titles in 1893, claiming a first three-in-a-row the following year and setting the then all-time record of five successive championships between 1901 and 1905.

After twenty years, Limerick emerged to break the dominance of the "big two" when they claimed five championship titles between 1910 and 1923. Limerick enjoyed a second golden era by winning a further five championship titles between 1933 and 1940, including four-in-a-row in 1933-1936. After a period of decline, Cork returned to dominate by winning nine championships between 1942 and 1956. Tipperary then emerged with what many people regard as their greatest ever team — between 1958 and 1971, they won nine championships. However, Cork returned to dominate the next two decades, winning thirteen championships between 1972 and 1986, including another 5-in-a-row in 1982-1986.

The 1990s saw a more equitable period develop in the championship with every team reaching at least one Munster final and title victories for all but Waterford. Waterford then had arguably their strongest period thus far, winning four championships from six final appearances between 2002 and 2010. The second decade of the new millennium saw a sharing of titles between the "big three" — Tipperary winning four titles, and Cork and Limerick winning 3 each, during which Waterford lost all of the 5 finals they contested. Limerick continued their successful run into the 2020s, winning a new all-time record of six championships in succession between 2019 and 2024 and another in 2026.

== Format ==
=== Knockout format (1888–2017) ===
Between 1888 and 2017 the Munster Championship was a knockout tournament whereby once a team was defeated they were eliminated from the championship. In the early years the pairings were drawn at random and there was no seeding. Each match was played as a single leg. If a match ended in a draw there was a replay. Drawn replays were settled with extra time; however, if both sides were still level at the end of extra time a second replay took place and so on until a winner was found. Extra-time was eventually adopted in the event of a draw for all championship games except the final.

The dominance of Cork and Tipperary eventually led to both these teams being placed on opposite sides of the championship draw. This was later viewed as a mean of penalising the other teams. While it might be possible to beat one of these teams it was deemed near impossible to beat the two strongest teams in the province in a single championship season. This practice was eventually abolished with a return to the open draw in which three of the five teams automatically qualified for the semi-final stage of the championship. Two other teams played in a lone quarter-final with the winner joining the other three teams at the semi-final stage.

=== Current Format ===
In 2017, the majority delegates voted to restructure the championship once again. The new format led to the introduction of the round robin within the championship and the creation of the Joe McDonagh Cup.

Group stage: There are five teams in the Munster Championship. During the course of a season (in April and May) each team plays the others once (a single round-robin system) for a total of four games. Teams receive two points for a win and one point for a draw. No points are awarded for a loss. Teams are ranked by total points. The top two teams in the group contest the Munster final with the third-placed team qualifies for the All-Ireland quarter-finals. The fourth-placed team are eliminated from the championship and the 5th placed team may be relegated to the Joe McDonagh Cup — if a Munster team win that competition, something that has yet to happen.

==== Tie-breakers ====
In the event of teams finishing on equal points, the tie shall be decided by the following means (in the order specified):

- Where two teams only are involved – the outcome of the meeting of the two teams
- Score difference – subtracting the total "Scores Against" from the total "Scores For"
- Highest Total "Score For"
- Highest Total "Goals For"
- A Play-Off

=== Knockout stage ===
Final: The top two teams in the group stage contest the final. The winning team are declared champions.

=== Promotion and relegation ===
A system of promotion and relegation exists between the Munster Championship and the Joe McDonagh Cup. If a Munster team win the Joe McDonagh Cup, they will enter a promotion/relegation playoff with the bottom team in that year's Munster Senior Hurling Championship, with the winner entering the following year's Munster Championship, and the loser returning to the following year's edition of the Joe McDonagh Cup.

The mechanism has never been employed as Kerry, the only Munster county not competing in the Munster Senior Hurling Championship, has never won the Joe McDonagh Cup.

== Qualification for subsequent competitions ==
=== All-Ireland qualification history ===
Between 1888 and 1996 the Munster final winners automatically qualified for either the All-Ireland semi-final or final. The introduction of the "back door" system in 1997 allowed the defeated Munster finalists access to the All-Ireland quarter-final, while the Munster champions received a bye to the All-Ireland semi-final. The "back door" system was replaced in 2002 by the All-Ireland Qualifiers which afforded every defeated team in the Munster Championship the chance of qualifying for the All-Ireland Championship. Between 2005 and 2007 both Munster finalists qualified for the All-Ireland quarter-finals, however, this system was abolished in 2008 with the Munster champions receiving a bye to the All-Ireland semi-final.

=== Current All-Ireland qualification ===
As of the 2018 championship, qualification for the All-Ireland Championship has changed due to the abolition of the qualifiers. The Munster champions continue to receive a bye to the All-Ireland semi-final while the defeated Munster finalists enter the All-Ireland quarter-finals. The third-placed team in the group enter the All-Ireland Championship at the preliminary quarter-final stage where they play either the champions or runners-up of the Joe McDonagh Cup.

== Teams ==
=== 2026 Championship ===
Five counties will compete in the 2026 Munster Senior Hurling Championship:

County	Location	Stadium	Province	Position in 2026 Championship	Championship Titles	Last Championship Title
Clare	Ennis	Cusack Park	Munster	3rd	6	1998
Cork	Cork	Páirc Uí Chaoimh	Munster	Runner-up	55	2025
Limerick	Limerick	Gaelic Grounds	Munster	Champions	26	2026
Tipperary	Thurles	Semple Stadium	Munster	5th	42	2016
Waterford	Waterford	Walsh Park	Munster	4th	9	2010

=== Debut of counties ===
Year	Debutants	Total
1888	Clare, Cork, Waterford	3
1889	Kerry, Limerick	2
1890-93	None	0
1894	Tipperary	1
1895-1958	None	0
1959	Galway	1
1960-	None	0
**Total**		**7**

=== Seasons in Munster SHC ===
The number of years that each county has played in the Munster SHC between 1888 and 2026. A total of 7 counties have competed in at least one season of the Munster SHC. Cork have participated in the most championships. The counties in bold participate in the 2026 Munster Senior Hurling Championship.

Years	Counties
138	**Cork**
136	**Limerick**
132	**Tipperary**
131	**Clare**
126	**Waterford**
62	Kerry
11	Galway

=== List of Munster Senior Hurling Championship counties ===
The following teams have competed in the Munster Championship for at least one season.

County	Appearances	Debut	Most recent	Championship titles	Last Championship title	Best Munster result
Clare	131	1888	2026	6	1998	**Champions**
Cork	138	1888	2026	55	2025	**Champions**
Galway	11	1959	1969	0	—	Semi-finals
Kerry	62	1889	2004	1	1891	**Champions**
Limerick	136	1889	2026	26	2026	**Champions**
Tipperary	132	1894	2026	42	2016	**Champions**
Waterford	126	1888	2026	9	2010	**Champions**

== Venues ==
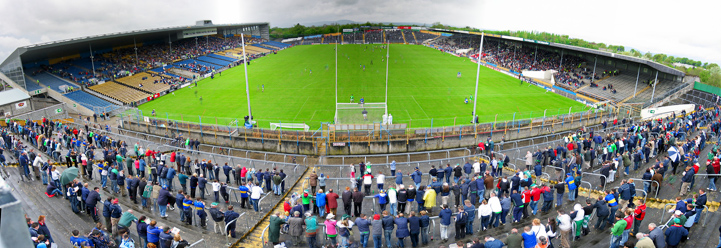
Semple Stadium is the home venue of Tipperary. As a regular final venue it is often regarded as the spiritual home of Munster hurling.

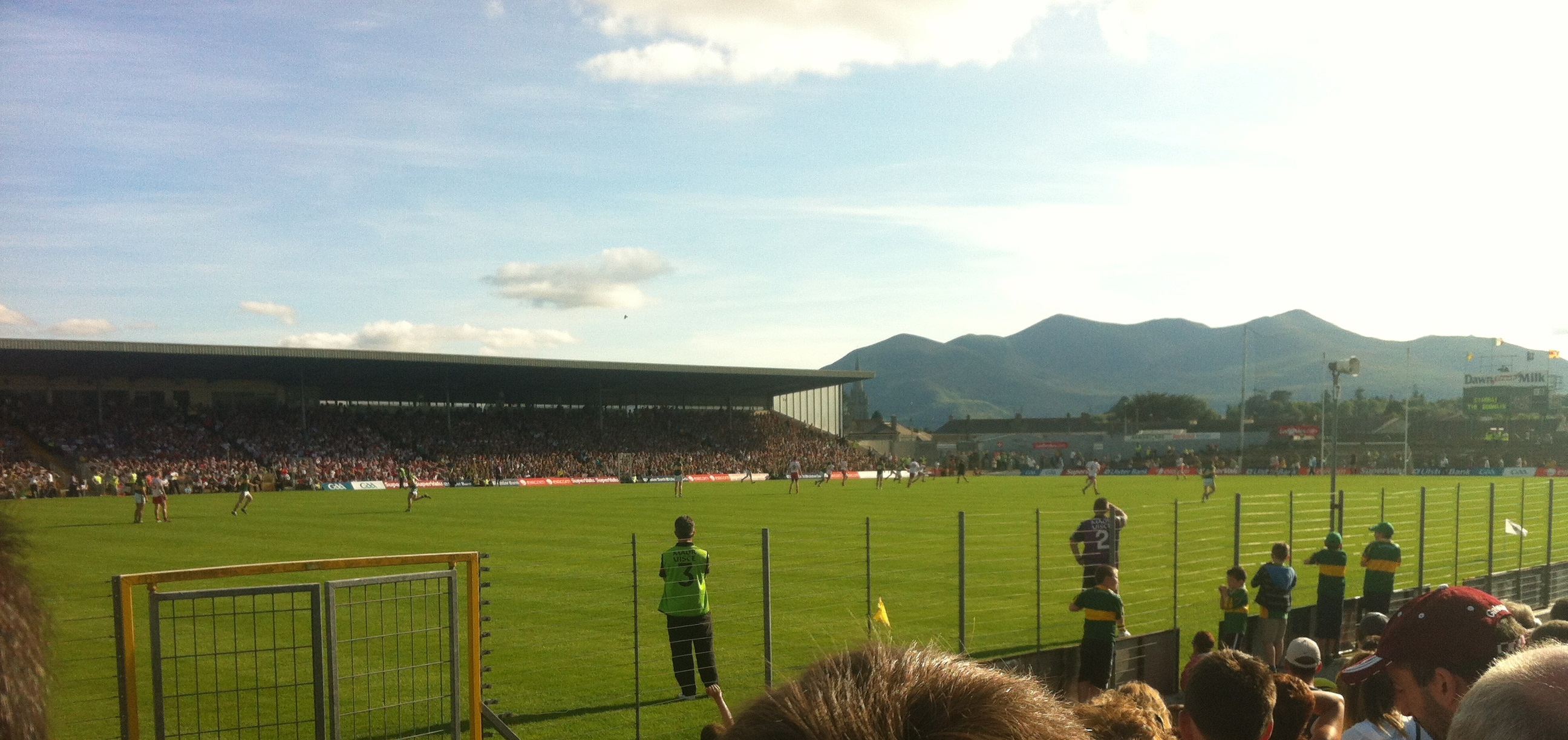
In spite of being a Gaelic football stronghold, FitzGerald Stadium has hosted several Munster finals.

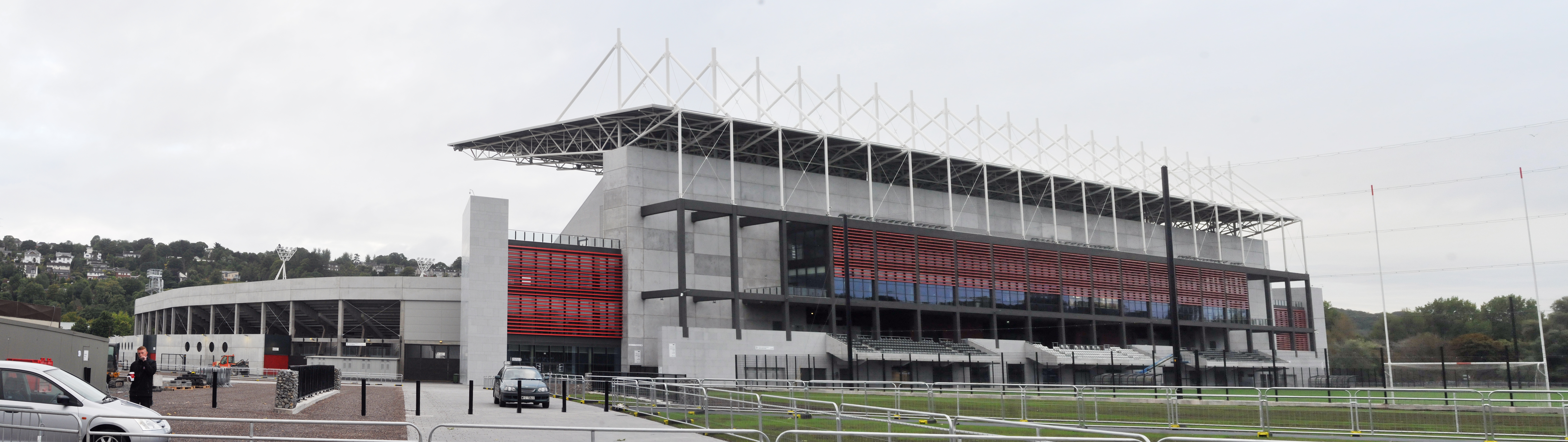
As well as being the home venue of Cork, Páirc Uí Chaoimh has often been used as a neutral venue for games.

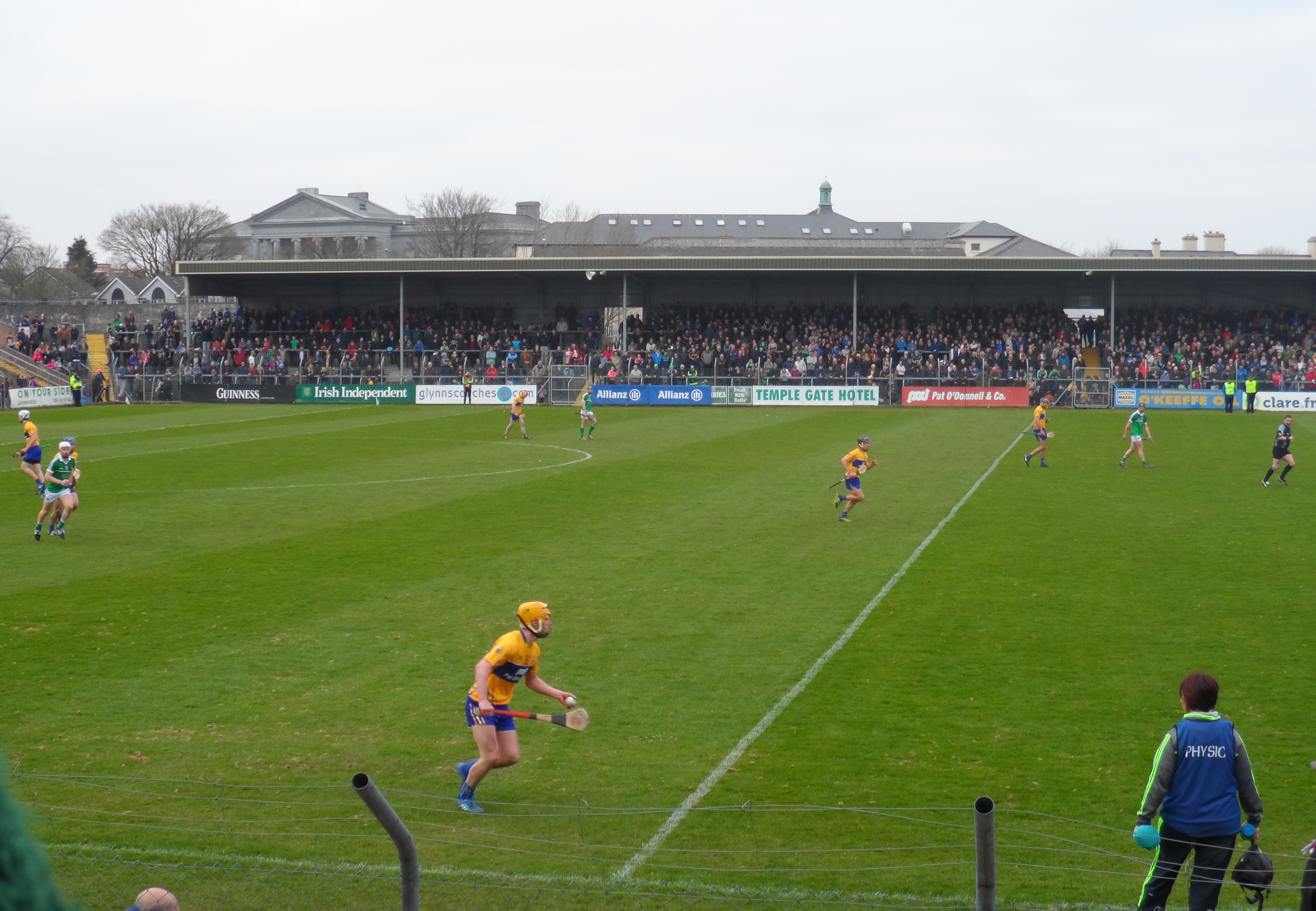
Cusack Park, the home venue of Clare, hosted its first championship game in 21 years in 2018.

=== History ===
Munster Championship matches were traditionally played at neutral venues or at a location that was deemed to be halfway between the two participants; however, teams eventually came to home and away agreements depending on the capacity of their stadiums. Teams that previously had agreements prior to the restructuring of the championship were Cork and Tipperary, Limerick and Cork and Limerick and Tipperary. Every second meeting between these teams was played at the home venue of one of them.

Waterford and Clare, in spite of having home stadiums, did not have home and away agreements with the other teams as their stadiums were initially deemed not to be of an adequate size for Munster Championship games. These teams usually played their games at neutral venues.

The introduction of the round robin format in 2018 saw home and away arrangements being agreed by all five teams, with every second meeting between the participating teams being played at the home venue of one of the teams. On 16 March 2018, it was confirmed that Waterford would play their two 'home' clashes at a neutral venue instead of Walsh Park. The ground has a capacity of just 8,000 and was deemed unsuitable. Nowlan Park in Kilkenny was mentioned as a possible venue for the Waterford-Tipperary game, however, the Munster Council cited a regulation whereby a change from a home venue can only be to a neutral venue within the province. In November 2018, the Munster Council once again voted against allowing Waterford to play home games in Nowlan Park. On 28 February 2019, it was confirmed that Waterford would play their two home championship games at Walsh Park after resolving a 'structural issue' which reduced the venue's capacity in 2018.

=== Attendances ===
Stadium attendances are a significant source of regular income for the Munster Council and for the teams involved. For the 2017 championship, average attendances were 31,998 with a total aggregate attendance figure of 127,992. For a four-game championship, it was the highest cumulative figure since 2008 (136,868). The 2017 figure represented the highest combined total for a Munster Championship since 2009, when 136,908 fans attended five games, including a semi-final replay between Limerick and Waterford. The change of format for the 2018 championship almost doubled attendances. A combined total of 248,809 attended 11 championship games, seeing a 95% increase on the previous year and a 147% rise on 2016. The highest ever attendance at a Munster Championship game was recorded on 30 July 1961 when a crowd of 62,175 attended the Munster final between Cork and Tipperary. This is the officially-recorded attendance, however, due to spectators storming the gates the attendance could have been as high as 70,000 or more.

=== Group stage ===
Fixtures in the five group stage rounds of the championship are played at the home ground of one of the two teams. Each team is guaranteed two home games.

=== Final ===
The final has historically been played at either Semple Stadium, Páirc Uí Chaoimh or the Gaelic Grounds. As of the 2018 championship, the final is played at one of these venues as per the home and away agreements between Cork, Limerick and Tipperary. If Clare or Waterford were to reach the Munster final the game would be played at a neutral venue.

=== Stadia and locations ===
County	Location	Province	Stadium	Capacity
Clare	Ennis	Munster	Cusack Park	19,000
Cork	Cork	Munster	Páirc Uí Chaoimh	45,000
Kerry	Killarney	Munster	Fitzgerald Stadium	40,000
Limerick	Limerick	Munster	Gaelic Grounds	44,203
Tipperary	Thurles	Munster	Semple Stadium	45,690
Waterford	Waterford	Munster	Walsh Park	12,000

== Managers ==
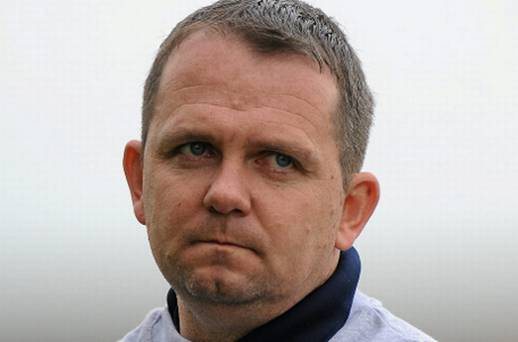
Davy Fitzgerald managed Waterford to the title in 2010.

Managers in the Munster Championship are involved in the day-to-day running of the team, including the training, team selection, and sourcing of players from the club championships. Their influence varies from county-to-county and is related to the individual county boards. From 2018, all inter-county head coaches must be Award 2 qualified. The manager is assisted by a team of two or three selectors and an extensive backroom team consisting of various coaches. Prior to the development of the concept of a manager in the 1970s, teams were usually managed by a team of selectors with one member acting as chairman. In this capacity, Paddy Leahy won several Munster Championship titles served as chairman of the Tipperary senior hurling selection committee between 1949 and 1965. Jim "Tough" Barry was trainer for all bar one of Cork's Munster Championship-winning teams between 1926 and 1966.

Winning managers (1969–present)
Manager	Team	Wins	Winning years
John Kiely	Limerick	7	2019, 2020, 2021, 2022, 2023, 2024, 2026
Justin McCarthy	Cork; Waterford	6	1975, 1984, 1985, 2002, 2004, 2007
Bertie Troy	Cork	5	1975, 1976, 1977, 1978, 1979
Michael "Babs" Keating	Tipperary	5	1987, 1988, 1989, 1991, 1993
Michael O'Brien	Cork	4	1984, 1985, 1990, 1992
Jim O'Regan	Cork	3	1969, 1970, 1972
Ger Loughnane	Clare	3	1995, 1997, 1998
Jimmy Barry-Murphy	Cork	3	1999, 2000, 2014
John Allen	Cork; Limerick	3	2005, 2006, 2013
Jackie Power	Limerick	2	1973, 1974
Noel Drumgoole	Limerick	2	1980, 1981
Johnny Clifford	Cork	2	1983, 1986
Tom Ryan	Limerick	2	1994, 1996
Liam Sheedy	Tipperary	2	2008, 2009
Declan Ryan	Tipperary	2	2011, 2012
Donie Nealon	Tipperary	1	1971
Nicky English	Tipperary	1	2001
Donal O'Grady	Cork	1	2003
Davy Fitzgerald	Waterford	1	2010
Éamonn O'Shea	Tipperary	1	2015
Michael Ryan	Tipperary	1	2016
Kieran Kingston	Cork	1	2017
John Meyler	Cork	1	2018
Pat Ryan	Cork	1	2025

Current managers
Nat.	Name	Team(s)	Appointed	Time as manager
	John Kiely	Limerick	13 September 2016	10 years, 52 days
	Brian Lohan	Clare	31 October 2019	7 years, 4 days
	Liam Cahill	Tipperary	18 July 2022	4 years, 109 days
	Peter Queally	Waterford	12 August 2024	2 years, 84 days
	Ben O'Connor	Cork	25 August 2025	1 year, 71 days

== Trophy and medals ==
At the end of the Munster final, the winning team is presented with a trophy. The Munster Cup, which is similar in design to the Liam MacCarthy Cup, is held by the winning team until the following year's final. Traditionally, the presentation is made at a special rostrum in the stand where GAA and political dignitaries and special guests view the match.

The cup is decorated with ribbons in the colours of the winning team. During the game the cup actually has both teams' sets of ribbons attached and the runners-up ribbons are removed before the presentation. The winning captain accepts the cup on behalf of his team before giving a short speech. Individual members of the winning team then have an opportunity to come to the rostrum to lift the cup.

The present Munster Cup is the third to be used. The first was used from 1928, when it was donated by the Munster Council, until 1990 when a replica was commissioned due to old age. In 2021, a proposal from the Limerick County Board to have the Munster Cup named in honour of Mick Mackey was approved by the Munster Council. The second trophy was then retired and replaced with a third one. An earlier attempt at renaming the cup had been rejected several years earlier.

In accordance with GAA rules, the Munster Council awards up to twenty-six gold medals to the winners of the Munster final.

== Sponsorship ==
Since 1995, the Munster Championship has been sponsored. The sponsor has usually been able to determine the championship's sponsorship name.

Period	Sponsor(s)	Name
1888-1994	No main sponsor	The Munster Championship
1995-2007	(Republic of Ireland) Guinness	The Guinness Munster Championship
2008-2009	(Republic of Ireland) RTÉ Sport, (United Arab Emirates) Etihad Airways, (Republic of Ireland) Guinness	The Munster GAA Hurling Championship
2010-2012	(Republic of Ireland) Centra, (United Arab Emirates) Etihad Airways, (Republic of Ireland) Guinness	The Munster GAA Hurling Championship
2013-2016	(Republic of Ireland) Centra, (United Arab Emirates) Etihad Airways, (United States) Liberty Insurance	The Munster GAA Hurling Championship
2017-	(Republic of Ireland) Centra, (Republic of Ireland) Littlewoods Ireland, (Republic of Ireland) Bord Gáis Energy	The Munster GAA Hurling Championship

== Media coverage ==
In the early years of coverage Radio Éireann had exclusive radio coverage of championship games. When Telefís Éireann was established on 31 December 1961, the new station was interested in the broadcasting of championship games. The GAA, however, were wary that live television coverage would result in lower attendances at games. Because of this, the association restricted annual coverage of its games to the All-Ireland hurling and football finals, the two All-Ireland football semi-finals and the two Railway Cup finals.

RTÉ broadcast highlights of the Munster final for the first time on 19 July 1970. These highlights programmes continued for the rest of the decade until the development of a dedicated highlights programme called The Sunday Game. The first edition of the programme on 8 July 1979 featured extensive coverage and analysis of the Munster final between Cork and Limerick. The first live broadcast of a Munster final took place on Network 2 on 2 July 1989.

In 2007, it was announced that TV3 had signed a three-year broadcasting deal with the GAA, resulting in senior inter-county championship games not being broadcast exclusively on RTÉ for the first time since 1962. TV3's first live championship broadcast was a semi-final between Limerick and Waterford on 1 June 2008. Following the completion of the initial three-year deal in 2010, the GAA were satisfied to give TV3 an expanded role in Gaelic games broadcasting. TV3 broadcast one of the semi-finals over the next three years, however, RTÉ retained the rights to the other matches, including the final.

Since 2017, Sky Sports and RTÉ have shared live coverage of championship matches. Sky broadcast their first championship match, a semi-final between Clare and Limerick, on 4 June 2017, while RTÉ had live coverage of the other three matches including the final.

== Championship upsets ==
"Giant-killing" is the possibility of unlikely victories in the various rounds of the championship, where lower ranked teams beat higher placed opposition. This is considered an integral part of the championship, and the attention gained by giant-killing teams can be as great as that for winners of the championship. Almost every team in the championship has a fondly remembered giant-killing act in its history. It is considered particularly newsworthy when a top championship team suffers an upset defeat.

- Waterford 9-3 Tipperary 3-4 (12 July 1959): An incredible game of hurling which saw reigning All-Ireland champions Tipperary trounced by Munster minnows Waterford. Tipperary played against the wind in the opening half, however, after one of the most remarkable halves in the history of hurling, Waterford had recorded 8-2 while holding Tipperary scoreless. Michael O'Hehir, who was commentating on a match in the Connacht Football Championship, announced the half-time score on Radio Éireann but advised listeners to "beware for the scoreline read is most probably a hoax". Tipperary were shell shocked; however, they managed to score 3–4 in the second half.
- Limerick 6-7 Tipperary 2-18 (29 July 1973): A day which saw Limerick end a provincial drought which had lasted since 1955. Tipperary looked a sure thing to win the game and looked set to break away into an unbeatable lead, however, Limerick hung in there with a fantastic goal-scoring ability. The game hinged on the very final passage of play. A Limerick shot appeared to have gone wide before it struck a Tipperary defender. In spite of this, Limerick were still awarded a 70-yard free. Richie Bennis stepped up to take it and was told that it would have to make a direct score as it was the final puck of the game. Bennis didn't fail, in spite of some Tipperary fans behind the goal claiming that the sliotar trailed off and went wide.
- Kerry 4-13 Waterford 3-13 (23 May 1993): Kerry went into this match with great optimism, in spite of not having won a match in the Munster Championship since 1926. Waterford got off to a great start by scoring a goal inside the first minute; however, Kerry battled for every ball. After the interval Kerry were still in contention; however, Waterford pulled five points clear and an upset looked unlikely. A Christy Walsh goal brought Kerry back into the game and a lucky goal from a long-range free from D. J. Leahy gave Kerry the impetus to drive on and win the game.
- Cork 4-16 Tipperary 2-14 (15 July 1990): Tipperary were reigning All-Ireland champions and were expected to build on this success in 1990 by retaining the title but despite a strong early start which gave them a good lead Tipperary lost their way and Cork won well in the end. Mark Foley played the game of his life, scoring 2-7 from play, and helped Cork to an eight-point defeat of the All-Ireland champions.
- Clare 2-13 Cork 3-9 (4 June 1995): Regarded as the game that changed Clare hurling forever. Trailing by two points with time almost up, Fergus Tuohy angled a line ball neatly into the Cork square and Ollie Baker flicked the ball to the net for the winning goal. Clare later claimed the Munster title for the first time in 63 years following a 1–17 to 0–11 defeat of reigning champions Limerick.
- Limerick 1-13 Clare 0-15 (16 June 1996): Played on the hottest day of the year, Limerick set out to topple the reigning All-Ireland champions on the opening day of their campaign. In a game that had a draw written all over it, Clare acquitted themselves well in energy-sapping conditions. While the game entered the dying stages Barry Foley leveled for Limerick and it looked like a replay would be required. The resultant puck-out fell into the hands of Limerick captain Ciarán Carey who took off on a remarkable solo-run. Balancing the sliotar on the end of his hurley, Carey ran 70 metres before sending over the match-winner.
- Waterford 2-23 Tipperary 3-12 (30 June 2002): Another Munster Championship game in which the record books were rewritten under the weight of expectation. Waterford were seeking a first Munster title in 39 years, while Tipperary were the reigning provincial and All-Ireland champions. A point adrift at the interval, Waterford finished in style scoring 1-6 without reply in the final twenty minutes. Ken McGrath scored seven points from play, in spite of going into the game nursing a shoulder injury.

== Roll of Honour ==
Performances in the Munster Senior Hurling Championship by county
County	Title(s)	Runners-up	Years won	Years runner-up
Cork	55	30	1888, 1890, 1892, 1893, 1894, 1901, 1902, 1903, 1904, 1905, 1907, 1912, 1915, 1919, 1920, 1926, 1927, 1928, 1929, 1931, 1939, 1942, 1943, 1944, 1946, 1947, 1952, 1953, 1954, 1956, 1966, 1969, 1970, 1972, 1975, 1976, 1977, 1978, 1979, 1982, 1983, 1984, 1985, 1986, 1990, 1992, 1999, 2000, 2003, 2005, 2006, 2014, 2017, 2018, 2025	1896, 1897, 1898, 1906, 1909, 1910, 1913, 1914, 1916, 1921, 1932, 1940, 1941, 1948, 1950, 1951, 1957, 1959, 1960, 1961, 1964, 1965, 1968, 1980, 1987, 1988, 1991, 2004, 2010, 2013, 2026
Tipperary	42	28	1895, 1896, 1898, 1899, 1900, 1906, 1908, 1909, 1913, 1916, 1917, 1922, 1924, 1925, 1930, 1937, 1941, 1945, 1949, 1950, 1951, 1958, 1960, 1961, 1962, 1964, 1965, 1967, 1968, 1971, 1987, 1988, 1989, 1991, 1993, 2001, 2008, 2009, 2011, 2012, 2015, 2016	1894, 1904, 1907, 1911, 1912, 1923, 1926, 1935, 1936, 1942, 1952, 1953, 1954, 1963, 1969, 1970, 1973, 1984, 1985, 1990, 1996, 1997, 2000, 2002, 2005, 2006, 2019, 2021
Limerick	26	28	1897, 1910, 1911, 1918, 1921, 1923, 1933, 1934, 1935, 1936, 1940, 1955, 1973, 1974, 1980, 1981, 1994, 1996, 2013, 2019, 2020, 2021, 2022, 2023, 2024, 2026	1891, 1893, 1895, 1902, 1905, 1917, 1919, 1920, 1922, 1924, 1937, 1939, 1944, 1945, 1946, 1947, 1949, 1956, 1971, 1975, 1976, 1979, 1992, 1995, 2001, 2007, 2014, 2025
Waterford	9	21	1938, 1948, 1957, 1959, 1963, 2002, 2004, 2007, 2010	1903, 1925, 1929, 1931, 1933, 1934, 1943, 1958, 1962, 1966, 1982, 1983, 1989, 1998, 2003, 2009, 2011, 2012, 2015, 2016, 2020
Clare	6	25	1889, 1914, 1932, 1995, 1997, 1998	1899, 1901, 1915, 1918, 1927, 1928, 1930, 1938, 1955, 1967, 1972, 1974, 1977, 1978, 1981, 1986, 1993, 1994, 1999, 2008, 2017, 2018, 2022, 2023, 2024
Kerry	1	5	1891	1889, 1890, 1900, 1892, 1908

== List of Finals ==
=== Legend ===
- Gold – All-Ireland champions
- Silver – All-Ireland runners-up

=== Since introduction of round robins ===
Year	Date	Winners		Runners-up		Venue	Winning captain(s)	Winning margin	Referee
Year	Date	County	Score	County	Score	Venue	Winning captain(s)	Winning margin	Referee
2026	7 June	Limerick	1-21	Cork	2-17	Páirc Uí Chaoimh	Cian Lynch	1	James Owens (Wexford)
2025	7 June	Cork	1-30 3-2 pens	Limerick	2-27 (AET)	Gaelic Grounds	Robert Downey	0	Thomas Walsh (Waterford)
2024	9 June	Limerick	1-26	Clare	1-20	Semple Stadium	Declan Hannon	6	Colm Lyons (Cork)
2023	11 June	Limerick	1–23	Clare	1–22	Gaelic Grounds	Declan Hannon	1	Liam Gordon (Galway)
2022	5 June	Limerick	1–29	Clare	0–29	Semple Stadium	Declan Hannon	3 (a.e.t)	J. Keenan (Wicklow)
2021	18 July	Limerick	2–29	Tipperary	3–21	Páirc Uí Chaoimh	Declan Hannon	5	P. O'Dwyer (Carlow)
2020	15 November	Limerick	0–25	Waterford	0–21	Semple Stadium	Declan Hannon	4	Colm Lyons (Cork)
2019	30 June	Limerick	2–26	Tipperary	2–14	Gaelic Grounds	Declan Hannon	12	P. O'Dwyer (Carlow)
2018	1 July	Cork	2–24	Clare	3–19	Semple Stadium	Séamus Harnedy	2	J. McGrath (Westmeath)

=== List of all Munster finals ===
Year	Winners		Runners-up		Venue	Winning Captain	Attendance	
Year	County	Score	County	Score	Venue	Winning Captain	Attendance	
1888	Cork	w/o	Clare	scr		William Gleeson		
1889	Clare	w/o	Kerry	scr		John Considine		
1890	Cork	2-0	Kerry	0-1		Dan Lane		
1891 (R)	Kerry	1-2; 2-4	Limerick	1-2; 0-1	Newcastlewest; Abbeyfeale	John O'Mahony		
1892	Cork	5-3 (28)	Kerry	2-5 (15)		Bill O'Callaghan		
1893	Cork	5-3 (28)	Limerick	0-0 (0)		John 'Curtis' Murphy		
1894	Cork	3-4 (19)	Tipperary	1-2 (7)	Charleville	Stephen Hayes		
1895	Tipperary	7-8 (43)	Limerick	0-2 (2)	Kilmallock	Mikey Maher		
1896 (R)	Tipperary	1-3 (6); 7-9 (30)	Cork	1-3 (6); 2-3 (9)		Mikey Maher		
1897	Limerick	4-9 (21)	Cork	1-6 (9)	Tipperary	Denis Grimes		
1898 (R)	Tipperary	3-0 (9); 1-13 (16)	Cork	2-3 (9); 1-2 (5)		Mikey Maher		
1899	Tipperary	5-16 (31)	Clare	0-08 (8)		Tim Condon		
1900	Tipperary	6-11 (29)	Kerry	1-09 (12)		Ned Hayes		
1901	Cork	3-10 (19)	Clare	2-06 (12)	Market's Field	Paddy Cantillon		
1902	Cork	2-09 (15)	Limerick	1-05 (8)	Tipperary	Jamesy Kelleher		
1903	Cork	5-16 (31)	Waterford	1-01 (4)	Tipperary	Steva Riordan		
1904	Cork	3-10 (19)	Tipperary	3-04 (13)		Denis Harrington		
1905	Cork	7-12 (33)	Limerick	1-04 (7)	Tipperary	Chris Young		
1906	Tipperary	3-04 (13)	Cork	0-09 (9)	Tipperary	Tom Semple		
1907	Cork	1-06 (9)	Tipperary	1-04 (7)		Jamesy Kelleher		
1908	Tipperary	w/o	Kerry	scr		Tom Semple		
1909	Tipperary	2-10 (16)	Cork	2-6 (12)		Tom Semple		
1910	Limerick	5-1 (16)	Cork	4-2 (14)	Tralee	John "Tyler" Mackey		
1911	Limerick	5-3 (18)	Tipperary	4-3 (15)		John "Tyler" Mackey		
1912	Cork	5-1 (16)	Tipperary	3-1 (10)		Barry Murphy		
1913	Tipperary	8-2 (26)	Cork	4-3 (15)	Fraher Field	Patrick 'Wedger' Meagher		
1914	Clare	3-2 (11)	Cork	3-1 (10)	Thurles Sportsfield	Amby Power		
1915	Cork	8-2 (26)	Clare	2-1 (7)	Markets Field	Connie Sheehan		
1916	Tipperary	5-0 (15)	Cork	1-2 (5)	Fraher Field	Johnny Leahy		
1917 (R)	Tipperary	3-4 (13); 6-4 (22)	Limerick	3-4 (13); 3-1 (10)	Cork Athletic Grounds; Cork Athletic Grounds	Johnny Leahy		
1918	Limerick	11-3 (36)	Clare	1-2 (5)	Thurles Sportsfield	Willie Hough		
1919	Cork	3-5 (14)	Limerick	1-6 (9)	Markets Field	Jimmy ‘Major’ Kennedy		
1920	Cork	3-4 (13)	Limerick	0-5 (5)	Cork Athletic Grounds	Dick O'Gorman		
1921	Limerick	5-2 (17)	Cork	1-2 (5)	Thurles Sportsfield	Bob McConkey		
1922 (R)	Tipperary	2-2 (8); 4-2 (14)	Limerick	2-2 (8); 1-4 (7)	Thurles Sportsfield; Markets Field	Johnny Leahy		
1923	Limerick	2-3 (9)	Tipperary	1-0 (3)	Cork Athletic Grounds	Paddy McInerney		
1924	Tipperary	3-1 (10)	Limerick	2-2 (8)	Fraher Field	Johnny Leahy		
1925	Tipperary	6-6 (24)	Waterford	1-2 (5)	Fraher Field	Johnny Leahy		
1926 (R) (R)	Cork	0-0 (0); 3-4 (13); 3-6 (15)	Tipperary	1-2 (5); 4-1 (13); 2-4 (10)	Cork Athletic Grounds; Thurles Sportsfield; Cork Athletic Grounds	Seán Óg Murphy		
1927	Cork	5-3 (18)	Clare	3-4 (13)	Market's Field	Seán Óg Murphy		
1928 (R)	Cork	2-2 (8); 6-4 (22)	Clare	2-2 (8); 2-2 (8)	Gaelic Grounds	Seán Óg Murphy		
1929	Cork	4-6 (18)	Waterford	2-3 (9)	Fraher Field	Dinny Barry-Murphy		
1930	Tipperary	6-4 (22)	Clare	2-8 (14)	Cork Athletic Grounds	John Joe Callanan	20,000	
1931 (R)	Cork	1-9 (12); 5-4 (19)	Waterford	4-0 (12); 1-2 (5)	Ned Hall Park; Ned Hall Park	Eudie Coughlan		
1932	Clare	5-2 (17)	Cork	4-1 (13)	Thurles Sportsfield	John Joe Doyle	25,000	
1933	Limerick	3-7 (16)	Waterford	1-2 (5)	Cork Athletic Grounds	Micky Fitzgibbon		
1934	Limerick	4-8 (20)	Waterford	2-5 (11)	Cork Athletic Grounds	Timmy Ryan	15,000	
1935	Limerick	5-5 (20)	Tipperary	1-4 (7)	Cork Athletic Grounds	Timmy Ryan		
1936	Limerick	8-5 (29)	Tipperary	4-6 (18)	Thurles Sportsfield	Mick Mackey	26,435	
1937	Tipperary	6-3 (21)	Limerick	4-3 (15)	Cork Athletic Grounds	Jim Lanigan	30,235	
1938	Waterford	3-5 (14)	Clare	2-5 (11)	Cork Athletic Grounds	Willie Walsh		
1939	Cork	4-3 (15)	Limerick	3-4 (13)	Thurles Sportsfield	Jack Lynch		
1940 (R)	Limerick	4-3 (15); 3-3 (12)	Cork	3-6 (15); 2-4 (10)	Thurles Sportsfield; Thurles Sportsfield	Mick Mackey		
1941	Tipperary	5-4 (19)	Cork	2-5 (11)	Gaelic Grounds	Johnny Ryan	10,000	
1942	Cork	4-15 (27)	Tipperary	4-1 (13)	Cork Athletic Grounds	Jack Lynch	24,320	
1943	Cork	2-13 (19)	Waterford	3-8 (17)	Cork Athletic Grounds	Mick Kennefick	15,000	
1944 (R)	Cork	6-7 (25); 4-6 (18)	Limerick	4-13 (25); 3-6 (15)	Thurles Sportsfield; Thurles Sportsfield	Seán Condon	18,000	
1945	Tipperary	4-3 (15)	Limerick	2-6 (12)	Thurles Sportsfield	John Maher	25,000	
1946	Cork	3-8 (17)	Limerick	1-3 (6)	Thurles Sportsfield	Christy Ring		
1947	Cork	2-6 (12)	Limerick	2-3 (9)	Thurles Sportsfield	Seán Condon		
1948	Waterford	4-7 (19)	Cork	3-9 (18)	Thurles Sportsfield	Jim Ware		
1949	Tipperary	1-16 (19)	Limerick	2-10 (16)	Cork Athletic Grounds	Pat Stakelum	35,000	
1950	Tipperary	2-17 (23)	Cork	3-11 (20)	FitzGerald Stadium	Seán Kenny	38,733	
1951	Tipperary	2-11 (17)	Cork	2-9 (15)	Gaelic Grounds	Jimmy Finn	42,237	
1952	Cork	1-11	Tipperary	2-6	Gaelic Grounds	Paddy Barry	42,326	
1953	Cork	3-10 (19)	Tipperary	1-11 (14)	Gaelic Grounds	Christy Ring	46,295	
1954	Cork	2-8 (14)	Tipperary	1-8 (11)	Gaelic Grounds	Christy Ring	50,071	
1955	Limerick	2-15 (21)	Clare	2-6 (12)	Gaelic Grounds	Liam Ryan	23,125	
1956	Cork	5-5 (20)	Limerick	3-5 (14)	Thurles Sportsfield	Christy Ring	47,017	
1957	Waterford	1-11 (14)	Cork	1-6 (9)	Thurles Sportsfield	Phil Grimes	40,368	
1958	Tipperary	4-12 (24)	Waterford	1-5 (8)	Thurles Sportsfield	Tony Wall	41,384	
1959	Waterford	3-9 (18)	Cork	2-9 (15)	Thurles Sportsfield	Frankie Walsh	55,174	
1960	Tipperary	4-13 (25)	Cork	4-11 (23)	Thurles Sportsfield	Tony Wall	49,670	
1961	Tipperary	3-06 (15)	Cork	0-07 (7)	Gaelic Grounds	Matt Hassett	62,175	
1962	Tipperary	5-14 (29)	Waterford	2-03 (9)	Gaelic Grounds	Jimmy Doyle	31,000	
1963	Waterford	0-11 (11)	Tipperary	0-08 (8)	Gaelic Grounds	Joe Condon	36,000	
1964	Tipperary	3-13 (22)	Cork	1-05 (8)	Gaelic Grounds	Mick Murphy	44,245	
1965	Tipperary	4-11 (23)	Cork	0-05 (5)	Gaelic Grounds	Jimmy Doyle	40,687	
1966	Cork	4-09 (21)	Waterford	2-09 (15)	Gaelic Grounds	Gerald McCarthy	31,352	
1967	Tipperary	4-12 (24)	Clare	2-06 (12)	Gaelic Grounds	Mick Roche	34,940	
1968	Tipperary	2-13 (19)	Cork	1-07 (10)	Gaelic Grounds	Mick Roche	43,238	
1969	Cork	4-06 (18)	Tipperary	0-09 (9)	Gaelic Grounds	Denis Murphy	43,569	
1970	Cork	3-10 (19)	Tipperary	3-08 (17)	Gaelic Grounds	Paddy Barry	33,900	
1971	Tipperary	4-16 (28)	Limerick	3-18 (27)	Fitzgerald Stadium	Tadhg O'Connor	31,118	
1972	Cork	6-18 (36)	Clare	2-08 (14)	Semple Stadium	Frank Norberg	25,048	
1973	Limerick	6-07 (25)	Tipperary	2-18 (24)	Semple Stadium	Éamonn Grimes	41,723	
1974	Limerick	6-14 (32)	Clare	3-09 (18)	Semple Stadium	Seán Foley	36,446	
1975	Cork	3-14 (23)	Limerick	0-12 (12)	Gaelic Grounds	Gerald McCarthy	46,851	
1976	Cork	3-15 (24)	Limerick	4-05 (17)	Páirc Uí Chaoimh	Ray Cummins	46,800	
1977	Cork	4-15 (27)	Clare	4-10 (22)	Semple Stadium	Martin O'Doherty	44,586	
1978	Cork	0-13 (13)	Clare	0-11 (11)	Semple Stadium	Charlie McCarthy	54,981	
1979	Cork	2-14 (20)	Limerick	0-9 (9)	Semple Stadium	John Horgan	47,849	
1980	Limerick	2-14 (20)	Cork	2-10 (16)	Semple Stadium	Seán Foley	43,090	
1981	Limerick	3-12 (21)	Clare	2-9 (15)	Semple Stadium	Paudie Fitzmaurice	40,205	
1982	Cork	5-31 (46)	Waterford	3-6 (15)	Semple Stadium	Jimmy Barry-Murphy	38,558	
1983	Cork	3-22 (31)	Waterford	0-12 (12)	Gaelic Grounds	Jimmy Barry-Murphy	20,816	
1984	Cork	4-15 (27)	Tipperary	3-14 (23)	Semple Stadium	John Fenton	50,093	
1985	Cork	4-17 (29)	Tipperary	4-11 (23)	Páirc Uí Chaoimh	Ger Cunningham	49,691	
1986	Cork	2-18 (24)	Clare	3-12 (21)	FitzGerald Stadium	Tom Cashman	39,975	
1987 (R)	Tipperary	1-18 (21); 4-22 (34)	Cork	1-18 (21); 1-22 (25)	Semple Stadium; FitzGerald Stadium	Richard Stakelum	56,005; 45,000	
1988	Tipperary	2-19 (25)	Cork	1-13 (16)	Gaelic Grounds	Pat O'Neill	50,000	
1989	Tipperary	0-26 (26)	Waterford	2-8 (14)	Páirc Uí Chaoimh	Bobby Ryan	30,241	
1990	Cork	4-16 (28)	Tipperary	2-14 (20)	Semple Stadium	Kieran McGuckin	54,000	
1991 (R)	Tipperary	2-16 (22); 4-19 (31)	Cork	4-10 (22); 4-15 (27)	Páirc Uí Chaoimh; Semple Stadium	Declan Carr	46,927; 55,600	
1992	Cork	1-22 (25)	Limerick	3-11 (20)	Páirc Uí Chaoimh	Ger FitzGerald	48,036	
1993	Tipperary	3-27 (36)	Clare	2-12 (18)	Gaelic Grounds	Michael O'Meara	41,557	
1994	Limerick	0-25 (25)	Clare	2-10 (16)	Semple Stadium	Gary Kirby	43,638	
1995	Clare	1-17 (20)	Limerick	0-11 (11)	Semple Stadium	Anthony Daly	46,361	
1996 (R)	Limerick	0-19 (19); 4-7 (19)	Tipperary	1-16 (19); 0-16 (16)	Gaelic Grounds; Páirc Uí Chaoimh	Ciarán Carey	43,525; 40,000	
1997	Clare	1-18 (21)	Tipperary	0-18 (18)	Páirc Uí Chaoimh	Anthony Daly	43,560	
1998 (R)	Clare	1-16 (19); 2-16 (22)	Waterford	3-10 (19); 0-10 (10)	Semple Stadium; Semple Stadium	Anthony Daly	51,417; 51,731	
1999	Cork	1-15 (18)	Clare	0-14 (14)	Semple Stadium	Mark Landers	54,000	
2000	Cork	0-23 (23)	Tipperary	3-12 (21)	Semple Stadium	Fergal Ryan	54,586	
2001	Tipperary	2-16 (22)	Limerick	1-17 (20)	Páirc Uí Chaoimh	Tommy Dunne	43,500	
2002	Waterford	2-23 (29)	Tipperary	3-12 (21)	Páirc Uí Chaoimh	Fergal Hartley	40,276	
2003	Cork	3-16 (25)	Waterford	3-12 (21)	Semple Stadium	Alan Browne	52,833	
2004	Waterford	3-16 (25)	Cork	1-21 (24)	Semple Stadium	Ken McGrath	52,100	
2005	Cork	1-21 (24)	Tipperary	1-16 (19)	Páirc Uí Chaoimh	Seán Óg Ó hAilpín	43,500	
2006	Cork	2-14 (20)	Tipperary	1-14 (17)	Semple Stadium	Pat Mulcahy	53,286	
2007	Waterford	3-17 (26)	Limerick	1-14 (17)	Semple Stadium	Michael 'Brick' Walsh	48,700	
2008	Tipperary	2-21 (27)	Clare	0-19 (19)	Gaelic Grounds	Eoin Kelly	48,076	
2009	Tipperary	4-14 (26)	Waterford	2-16 (22)	Semple Stadium	Willie Ryan	40,330	
2010 (R-ET)	Waterford	2-15 (21); 1-16 (19)	Cork	2-15 (21); 1-13 (16)	Semple Stadium; Semple Stadium	Stephen Molumphy	35,375; 22,763	
2011	Tipperary	7-19 (40)	Waterford	0-19 (19)	Páirc Uí Chaoimh	Eoin Kelly	36,654	
2012	Tipperary	2-17 (23)	Waterford	0-16 (16)	Páirc Uí Chaoimh	Paul Curran	26,438	
2013	Limerick	0-24 (24)	Cork	0-15 (15)	Gaelic Grounds	Donal O'Grady	42,730	
2014	Cork	2-24 (30)	Limerick	0-24 (24)	Páirc Uí Chaoimh	Pa Cronin	36,075	
2015	Tipperary	0-21 (21)	Waterford	0-16 (16)	Semple Stadium	Brendan Maher	43,084	
2016	Tipperary	5-19 (34)	Waterford	0-13 (13)	Gaelic Grounds	Brendan Maher	26,508	
2017	Cork	1-25 (28)	Clare	1-20 (23)	Semple Stadium	Stephen McDonnell	45,558	
2018	Cork	2-24 (30)	Clare	3-19 (28)	Semple Stadium	Séamus Harnedy	45,364	
2019	Limerick	2-26 (32)	Tipperary	2-14 (20)	Gaelic Grounds	Declan Hannon	44,261	
2020	Limerick	0-25 (25)	Waterford	0-21 (21)	Semple Stadium	Declan Hannon	0*	
2021	Limerick	2-29 (35)	Tipperary	3-21 (30)	Páirc Uí Chaoimh	Declan Hannon	7,000*	^{*} Match in which COVID-19 restrictions limited attendance
2022	Limerick	1-29 (32)	Clare	0-29 (29)	Semple Stadium	Declan Hannon	45,158	
2023	Limerick	1-23 (26)	Clare	1-22 (25)	Gaelic Grounds	Declan Hannon	43,756	
2024	Limerick	1-26 (29)	Clare	1-20 (23)	Semple Stadium	Declan Hannon	45,148	
2025	Cork	1-30 (33) Pen 3	Limerick	2-27 (33) Pen 2	Gaelic Grounds	Robert Downey	43,580	
2026	Limerick	1-21 (24)	Cork	2-17 (23)	Páirc Uí Chaoimh	Cian Lynch	43,365	

== Team records and statistics ==
=== Team results (since the introduction of the Joe McDonagh Cup) ===
Legend

- 1st – Champions
- 2nd – Runners-up
- 3rd – All-Ireland Qualifiers (3rd in Group Stage, QF/SF in Covid-era 2020/2021)

For each year, the number of teams (in brackets) are shown.

Team	2018 (5)	2019 (5)	2020 (5)	2021 (5)	2022 (5)	2023 (5)	2024 (5)	2025 (5)	2026 (5)	Years
Clare	2nd	4th	QF	SF	2nd	2nd	2nd	4th	3rd	9
Cork	1st	3rd	SF	SF	3rd	4th	3rd	1st	2nd	9
Limerick	3rd	1st	1st	1st	1st	1st	1st	2nd	1st	9
Tipperary	4th	2nd	SF	2nd	5th	3rd	5th	3rd	5th	9
Waterford	5th	5th	2nd	QF	4th	5th	4th	5th	4th	9

=== Team progress since 1997 ===
Below is a record of each county's performance since the introduction of the qualifier system to the All-Ireland series in 1997.

Key

Winner
Final
Semi Final
Quarter Final
Qualifier Rounds 1-3
Provincial Championship/Round Robin

All-Ireland Championship	1997	1998	1999	2000	2001	2002	2003	2004	2005	2006	2007	2008	2009	2010	2011	2012	2013	2014	2015	2016	2017	2018	2019	2020	2021	2022	2023	2024	2025	2026
Clare	W	SF	SF	PR	PR	F	Q1	QF	SF	SF	QF	QF	Q2	Q2	Q2	Q3	W	Q1	Q2	QF	QF	SF	RR	Q2	Q2	SF	SF	W	RR	
Cork	PR	PR	W	SF	PR	Q2	F	W	W	F	QF	SF	Q3	SF	Q3	SF	F	SF	QF	Q2	SF	SF	QF	Q2	F	QF	RR	F	F	
Kerry	PR	PR	PR	PR	-	-	Q1	PR	-	-	-	-	-	-	-	-	-	-	-	-	-	-	-	-	-	-	-	-	-	-
Limerick	PR	PR	PR	PR	QF	Q1	Q2	Q1	QF	QF	F	Q3	SF	Q2	QF	QF	SF	SF	Q2	Q2	Q1	W	SF	W	W	W	W	SF	QF	
Tipperary	F	PR	PR	QF	W	SF	SF	Q2	QF	QF	QF	SF	F	W	F	SF	Q2	F	SF	W	SF	RR	W	QF	QF	RR	QF	RR	W	RR
Waterford	PR	SF	PR	PR	PR	SF	Q2	SF	QF	SF	SF	F	SF	SF	SF	QF	Q3	Q2	SF	SF	F	RR	RR	F	SF	RR	RR	RR	RR	RR

== Player records ==
=== Munster medal winners ===
#	Player	Team	Titles	Years
1	John Doyle	Tipperary	10	1949, 1950, 1951, 1958, 1960, 1961, 1962, 1964, 1965, 1967
1	Jimmy Barry-Murphy	Cork	10	1975, 1976, 1977, 1978, 1979, 1982, 1983, 1984, 1985, 1986
3	Christy Ring	Cork	9	1942, 1943, 1944, 1946, 1947, 1952, 1953, 1954, 1956
3	Jimmy Doyle	Tipperary	9	1958, 1960, 1961, 1962, 1964, 1965, 1967, 1968, 1971
3	Charlie McCarthy	Cork	9	1966, 1969, 1970, 1972, 1975, 1976, 1977, 1978, 1979
3	Gerald McCarthy	Cork	9	1966, 1969, 1970, 1972, 1975, 1976, 1977, 1978, 1979
3	Ray Cummins	Cork	9	1969, 1970, 1972, 1975, 1976, 1977, 1978, 1979, 1982
3	Johnny Crowley	Cork	9	1976, 1977, 1978, 1979, 1982, 1983, 1984, 1985, 1986
9	Donie Nealon	Tipperary	8	1958, 1960, 1961, 1962, 1964, 1965, 1967, 1968
9	Tom Cashman	Cork	8	1977, 1978, 1979, 1982, 1983, 1984, 1985, 1986
9	Dermot McCurtain	Cork	8	1977, 1978, 1979, 1982, 1983, 1984, 1985, 1986
9	Nickie Quaid	Limerick	8	2013, 2019, 2020, 2021, 2022, 2023, 2024, 2026
9	David Reidy	Limerick	8	2013, 2019, 2020, 2021, 2022, 2023, 2024, 2026

== See also ==
- Munster Senior Hurling Championship records and statistics
- All-Ireland Senior Hurling Championship
  - Connacht Senior Hurling Championship
  - Leinster Senior Hurling Championship
  - Ulster Senior Hurling Championship
- Munster Senior Football Championship
