= 2021 Munster Senior Hurling Championship =

Instance of Munster Hurling championship

Munster Senior Hurling Championship
Tournament details
- Province: Munster
- Year: 2021
- Trophy: The Munster Cup
- Date: 27 June – 18 July 2021
- Teams: 5
- Defending champions: Limerick

Winners
- Champions: Limerick (22nd win)
- Manager: John Kiely
- Captain: Declan Hannon
- Qualify for: Munster SHC Final; All-Ireland SHC

Runners-up
- Runners-up: Tipperary
- Manager: Liam Sheedy
- Captain: Séamus Callanan

Other
- Matches played: 4

The 2021 Munster Senior Hurling Championship was the 134th staging of the Munster Senior Hurling Championship since its establishment by the Gaelic Athletic Association in 1888.

Limerick were the twice-defending Munster champions. They won the title for the 3rd year in succession, defeating Tipperary in the final.

== Teams ==
The Munster championship was contested by five of the six counties from the Irish province of Munster. The exception was Kerry, traditionally the province's weakest at hurling (but strongest in football).

Team	Colours	Manager	Captain	Vice-captain(s)	Most recent success		
Team	Colours	Manager	Captain	Vice-captain(s)	All-Ireland	Provincial	League
Cork		Kieran Kingston	Patrick Horgan		2005	2018	1998
Clare		Brian Lohan	John Conlon		2013	1998	2016
Limerick		John Kiely	Declan Hannon		2020	2020	2020
Tipperary		Liam Sheedy	Séamus Callanan	Noel McGrath	2019	2016	2008
Waterford		Liam Cahill	Conor Prunty	Jamie Barron; Stephen Bennett	1959	2010	2015

== Bracket ==
Quarter-Finals
Waterford	0-21
Clare	1-22

Semi-Finals
Limerick	2-22
Cork	1-17
Tipperary	3-23
Clare	2-22

Final
Limerick	2-29
Tipperary	3-21

== Quarter-finals ==
27 June 2021 Quarter-final	Waterford	0–21 (21) – (25) 1–22	Clare	Thurles
15:30 IST (UTC+1)				Venue: Semple Stadium
	Pts: Stephen Bennett 12 (10f), A Gleeson 4, C Lyons 1, P Curran 1, K Bennett 1, N Montgomery 1, M Kearney 1.	Report	Gls: T Kelly 1 (pen); Pts: T Kelly 12 (7f), A McCarthy 3, D Reidy 2, I Galvin 2, R Taylor 2, D Ryan 1.	Referee: C Lyons (Cork); TV: RTÉ 1

== Semi-finals ==
3 July 2021 Semi-final	Limerick	2–22 (28) – (20) 1–17	Cork	Thurles
19:00 IST (UTC+1)				Venue: Semple Stadium
	Gls: K Hayes 1, D O'Donovan 1. Pts: A Gillane 6 (6f), D Byrnes 3 (1f), C Lynch 3, P Casey 3, S Flanagan 2, G Hegarty 2, W O’Donoghue 1, G Mulcahy 1, D Reidy 1.	Report	Gls: S Kingston 1. Pts: P Horgan 5 (5f), J O’Connor 3, D Fitzgibbon 3, S Barrett 2, T O'Mahony 1, S Harnedy 1, R O'Flynn 1, S Kingston 1.	Referee: P O'Dwyer (Carlow); TV: Sky Sports

4 July 2021 Semi-final	Tipperary	3–23 (32) – (28) 2–22	Clare	Limerick
15:45 IST (UTC+1)		(HT: 1–13 – 2–11)		Venue: LIT Gaelic Grounds
	Gls: J Forde 1 (pen), S Callanan 1, M Breen 1. Pts: J Forde 8 (3fs, 1 sideline, 1 65), J O’Dwyer 4, J Morris 3, D McCormack 2, A Flynn 2, R Maher 1, S Callanan 1, M Breen 1, W Connors 1.	Report	Gls: T Kelly 1, I Galvin 1. Pts: T Kelly 9 (8fs), I Galvin 3, R Taylor 2, C Malone 2, A Shanagher 1, C Galvin 1, D Reidy 1, A McCarthy 1, J Conlon 1, R Hayes 1.	Referee: J Owens (Wexford); TV: RTÉ 2

== Final ==
18 July 2021 Final	Limerick	2–29 (35) – (30) 3–21	Tipperary	Cork
16:15 IST (UTC+1)		(HT: 0–12 – 2–16)		Venue: Páirc Uí Chaoimh
	Gls: S Flanagan 1, K Hayes 1. Pts: A Gillane 6 (4f), T Morrissey 6 (1f), P Casey 5, D Byrnes 4 (2f, 1 65), S Flanagan 3, G Hegarty 3, C Lynch 1, D Reidy 1.	Report	Gls: J Morris 1, J O'Dwyer 1, M Kehoe 1. Pts: J Forde 11 (3f, 1 65), J Morris 2, J O’Dwyer 2, R Maher 1, D McCormack 1, S Callanan 1, S Kennedy 1, W Connors 1, M Breen 1.	Referee: P O'Dwyer (Carlow); Attendance: 7,000; TV: RTÉ 2

== See also ==
- 2021 All-Ireland Senior Hurling Championship
  - 2021 Leinster Senior Hurling Championship
  - 2021 Joe McDonagh Cup
