= 2021 All-Ireland Senior Hurling Championship =

Championship details
- Dates: 26 June — 22 August 2021
- Teams: 11

All-Ireland champions
- Winning team: Limerick (10th win)
- Captain: Declan Hannon
- Manager: John Kiely

All-Ireland Finalists
- Losing team: Cork
- Captain: Patrick Horgan
- Manager: Kieran Kingston

Provincial champions
- Munster: Limerick
- Leinster: Kilkenny
- Ulster: Not Played
- Connacht: Not Played

Championship statistics
- No. matches played: 17
- Goals total: 60 (3.52 per game)
- Points total: 674 (39.64 per game)
- Top Scorer: Patrick Horgan (0–54)
- All-Star Team: See here

The 2021 All-Ireland Senior Hurling Championship (SHC) was the 134th staging of the All-Ireland Senior Hurling Championship, the Gaelic Athletic Association's premier inter-county hurling tournament, since its establishment in 1887. The competition began on 26 June and ended on 22 August 2021.

Antrim, having won the 2020 Joe McDonagh Cup, returned to the Leinster Championship for the first time since the 2015 competition. Limerick entered the competition as the defending champion.

The final was played on 22 August 2021 at Croke Park in Dublin, between Limerick and Cork, in what was their first ever meeting in a final. Limerick won the match with a display that is regarded by many to be one of the greatest performances by a team in an All-Ireland Final. Limerick showed immense dominance in the first half opening a 13-point gap, the scores 3–18 to 1–11 at the interval. This dominance would continue in the second half in more subdued fashion but Limerick still managed to extend their lead to 16 by the final whistle, the full time score 3–32 to 1–22. This was the first time that Limerick won consecutive editions of this competition, the team's an overall tenth tenth title, as well as a third title in four seasons.

Cork's Patrick Horgan was the championship's top scorer with 0–54.

Limerick captain Declan Hannon became only the second captain after Christy Ring to lift the Liam MacCarthy Cup on three occasions.

== Format change ==
In December 2020, a plan by the Central Competitions Control Committee (CCCC) was approved by the GAA's management committee. The plan saw the re-introduction of the provincial knock-out/qualifier system, in line with the pre-2018 format, thus resulting in the provincial round robins being temporarily discarded. Relegation to and promotion from the Joe McDonagh Cup was re-introduced. The two beaten Leinster quarter-final teams are due to play a preliminary qualifier round, with the losers dropping to the McDonagh Cup and winners progressing to round 1 of the qualifiers.

Round 1 of the qualifiers will feature the playoff winners playing a Munster quarter-finalist or semi-finalist, and a Leinster semi-finalist playing a Munster quarter-finalist or semi-finalist.

Round 2 of the qualifiers will feature the Round 1 winners playing a Munster or Leinster semi-finalist, with the winners advancing to the All-Ireland quarter-finals.

The draws for the hurling championship were delayed until 19 and 20 April 2021 due to the COVID-19 pandemic.

=== Qualification and progression ===
	Teams entering in this round	Teams advancing from previous round
Preliminary Round (2 teams)	Leinster Quarter-Finalists; Leinster Quarter-Finalists	
Round 1 (4 teams)	Leinster Semi-Finalist; Munster Semi-Finalist; Munster Quarter-Finalist	Winner from the preliminary Round
Round 2 (4 Teams)	Leinster Semi-Finalist; Munster Semi-Finalist	2 Winners from Round 1
Quarter-Finals (4 Teams)	Leinster Runners-Up; Munster Runners-Up	2 Winners from Round 2
Semi-Finals (4 teams)	Leinster Champions; Munster Champions	2 winners from Quarter-Finals
Final (2 teams)		2 winners from the Semi-Finals

== Team changes ==
=== To Championship ===
Promoted from the Joe McDonagh Cup

- Antrim

=== From Championship ===
Relegated to the Joe McDonagh Cup

- None

== Teams ==
=== General information ===
Eleven counties will compete in the All-Ireland Senior Hurling Championship: six teams in the Leinster Senior Hurling Championship and five teams in the Munster Senior Hurling Championship.

County	Last provincial title	Last championship title	Position in 2020 championship	Current championship
Antrim	2017	—	Champions (Joe McDonagh Cup)	Leinster Senior Hurling Championship
Clare	1998	2013	Quarter-finals	Munster Senior Hurling Championship
Cork	2018	2005	Round 2	Munster Senior Hurling Championship
Dublin	2013	1938	Round 1	Leinster Senior Hurling Championship
Galway	2018	2017	Semi-finals	Leinster Senior Hurling Championship
Kilkenny	2020	2015	Semi-finals	Leinster Senior Hurling Championship
Laois	1949	1915	Round 1	Leinster Senior Hurling Championship
Limerick	2020	2020	Champions	Munster Senior Hurling Championship
Tipperary	2016	2019	Quarter-finals	Munster Senior Hurling Championship
Waterford	2010	1959	Runners-up	Munster Senior Hurling Championship
Wexford	2019	1996	Round 2	Leinster Senior Hurling Championship

=== Personnel and kits ===
Team	Manager	Captain(s)	Sponsor
Antrim	Darren Gleeson	Conor McCann, Paddy Burke	
Clare	Brian Lohan	John Conlon	Pat O’Donnell
Cork	Kieran Kingston	Patrick Horgan	Sports Direct
Dublin	Mattie Kenny	Danny Sutcliffe	
Galway	Shane O'Neill	Pádraic Mannion	
Kilkenny	Brian Cody	Adrian Mullen, Richie Reid	
Laois	Séamus Plunkett	Enda Rowland	
Limerick	John Kiely	Declan Hannon	
Tipperary	Liam Sheedy	Séamus Callanan, Noel McGrath	
Waterford	Liam Cahill	Conor Prunty, Jamie Barron (v), Stephen Bennett (v)	
Wexford	Davy Fitzgerald	Lee Chin, Matthew O'Hanlon (v)	

== Summary ==
=== Championships ===
Level on Pyramid	Competition	Champions	Runners-up
Tier 1	2021 All-Ireland Senior Hurling Championship	Limerick	Cork
Tier 1	2021 Leinster Senior Hurling Championship	Kilkenny	Dublin
Tier 1	2021 Munster Senior Hurling Championship	Limerick	Tipperary
Tier 2	2021 Joe McDonagh Cup	Westmeath	Kerry
Tier 3	2021 Christy Ring Cup	Offaly	Derry
Tier 4	2021 Nicky Rackard Cup	Mayo	Tyrone
Tier 5	2021 Lory Meagher Cup	Fermanagh	Cavan

=== 2021 County Ranking (Championship) ===
Pos	Team	Position	Notes
1	Limerick	All-Ireland Champions	Munster champions
2	Cork	All-Ireland Runners-Up	
3	Kilkenny	Semi-Finals	Leinster champions
4	Waterford	Semi-Finals	
5	Dublin	Quarter-Finals	Leinster Runners-Up
6	Tipperary	Quarter-Finals	Munster Runners-Up
7	Clare	Round 2	
8	Galway	Round 2	Highest Ranked Connacht County
9	Wexford	Round 1	
10	Laois	Round 1	
11	Antrim	Preliminary Round	Highest Ranked Ulster County, Relegated
12	Westmeath	Joe McDonagh Cup champions	Promoted
13	Kerry	2nd (Joe McDonagh)	
14	Down	3rd (Joe McDonagh)	
15	Carlow	4th (Joe McDonagh)	
16	Meath	5th (Joe McDonagh)	
17	Kildare	6th (Joe McDonagh)	Relegated
18	Offaly	Christy Ring Cup champions	Promoted
19	Derry	2nd (Christy Ring)	
20	Sligo	3rd (Christy Ring)	
21	Wicklow	4th (Christy Ring)	
22	Roscommon	5th (Christy Ring)	Relegated
23	London	–	Did not enter
24	Mayo	Nicky Rackard Cup champions	Promoted
25	Tyrone	2nd (Nicky Rackard)	
26	Armagh	3rd (Nicky Rackard)	
27	Donegal	4th (Nicky Rackard)	
28	Leitrim	5th (Nicky Rackard)	Relegated
29	Warwickshire	–	Did not enter
30	Fermanagh	Lory Meagher Cup Champions	Promoted
31	Cavan	2nd (Lory Meagher)	
32	Longford	3rd (Lory Meagher)	
33	Louth	4th (Lory Meagher)	
34	Monaghan	5th (Lory Meagher)	
35	Lancashire	–	Did not enter

== Provincial championships ==
=== Leinster Senior Hurling Championship ===
Quarter-Finals
Dublin	3–31
Antrim	0–22
Laois	1–23
Wexford	5–31

Semi-Finals
Galway	1–14
Dublin	1–18
Kilkenny	2–37
Wexford	2–29

Final
Dublin	0–19
Kilkenny	1–25

==== Leinster quarter-finals ====
26 June 2021 Quarter-final	Dublin	3–31 (40) – (22) 0–22	Antrim	Navan
15:00 IST (UTC+1)				Venue: Páirc Tailteann
	Gls: R Hayes 1, C Boland 1, C O'Sullivan 1. Pts: D Burke 11 (6f); C Crummey 3, D Sutcliffe 3, R Hayes 3, R McBride 2, C O’Sullivan 2, C Burke 1, E O’Donnell 1, O O’Rorke 1, C Boland 1, F Whitely 1, S Moran 1, P Crummey 1.	Report	Pts: C Clarke 9 (6f, 1 65), N McManus 6, K Molloy 3, C Boland 1, M Bradley 1, C Cunning 1, C McCann 1, J McNaughton 1 (f) each.	Referee: L Gordon (Galway)

26 June 2021 Quarter-final	Laois	1–23 (26) – (46) 5–31	Wexford	Kilkenny
18:00 IST (UTC+1)				Venue: UPMC Nowlan Park
	Gls: C Comerford 1. Pts: PJ Scully 8 (5fs 1 ‘65’), C Dwyer 4, P Purcell 3, C Collier 2, R King 2, J Kelly 1, L Cleere 1, M Whelan 1, C Comerford 1.	Report	Gls: C McDonald 2, L Chin 1, R O'Connor 1, D Dunne 1, Pts: R O’Connor 7; P Morris 5 (1f); C McDonald 4; K Foley 3; D O’Keeffe 2, M Dwyer 2, L Chin 2 (1f); L Og McGovern 2; C Dunbar 1, M Fanning 1 (f), S Murphy 1, G Bailey 1.	Referee: T Walsh (Waterford)

==== Leinster semi-finals ====
3 July 2021 Semi-final	Dublin	1–18 (21) – (17) 1–14	Galway	Dublin
14:00 IST (UTC+1)				Venue: Croke Park
	Gls: C Crummey 1 Pts: D Burke 6 (4f), D Sutcliffe 3, D Gray 2, R Hayes 2, A Nolan 1 (f), C Burke 1, R McBride 1, C Boland 1, C O’Sullivan 1.	Report	Gls: C Whelan 1 Pts: J Canning 6 (4f, 1 ’65), C Whelan 2, E Niland 2 (1f), P Mannion 1, C Mannion 1, C Cooney 1, A Harte 1.	Referee: J Murphy (Limerick)

3 July 2021 Semi-final	Kilkenny	2–37 (43) – (35) 2–29 (aet)	Wexford	Dublin
16:30 IST (UTC+1)		(HT: 0–15 – 0–14) (FT: 1–27 – 1–27)		Venue: Croke Park
	Gls: E Cody 1, W Walsh 1. Pts: TJ Reid 16 (11fs, 1 ‘65); E Cody 5, R Reid 2, J Maher 2, J Bergin 2, E Murphy 1 (f), T Walsh 1, W Walsh 1, C Fogarty 1, A Mullen 1, J Donnelly 1, M Keoghan 1, A Murphy 1, B Ryan 1, M Carey 1.	Report	Gls: M Fanning 1 (pen), D Dunne 1. Pts: L Chin 14 (12fs), R O’Connor 3, L Óg McGovern 2, S Murphy 2, C McDonald 2, M O’Hanlon 1, D O’Keeffe 1, P Morris 1 (f), J O’Connor 1, L Ryan 1, M Fanning 1 (f).	Referee: F Horgan (Tipperary)

==== Leinster final ====
17 July 2021 Final	Dublin	0–19 (19) – (28) 1–25	Kilkenny	Dublin
19:30 IST (UTC+1)				Venue: Croke Park
	Pts: D Burke 10 (8f), D Sutcliffe 2, C Crummey 2, C Boland 1, A Nolan 1 (f), R McBride 1, J Malone 1, D Keogh 1.	Report	Gls: TJ Reid 1. Pts: TJ Reid 10 (8f, 1 65), J Maher 3, A Mullen 2, A Murphy 2, J Bergin 2, M Keoghan 2, E Cody 1, C Buckley 1, J Bergin 1, M Carey 1.	Referee: J Murphy (Limerick); Attendance: 9,000

=== Munster Senior Hurling Championship ===
Quarter-Finals
Waterford	0–21
Clare	1–22

Semi-Finals
Limerick	2–22
Cork	1–17
Tipperary	3–23
Clare	2–22

Final
Limerick	2–29
Tipperary	3–21

==== Munster quarter-final ====
27 June 2021 Quarter-final	Waterford	0–21 (21) – (25) 1–22	Clare	Thurles
15:30 IST (UTC+1)				Venue: Semple Stadium
	Pts: Stephen Bennett 12 (10f), A Gleeson 4, C Lyons 1, P Curran 1, K Bennett 1, N Montgomery 1, M Kearney 1.	Report	Gls: T Kelly 1 (pen); Pts: T Kelly 12 (7f), A McCarthy 3, D Reidy 2, I Galvin 2, R Taylor 2, D Ryan 1.	Referee: C Lyons (Cork); TV: RTÉ 1

==== Munster semi-finals ====
3 July 2021 Semi-final	Limerick	2–22 (28) – (20) 1–17	Cork	Thurles
19:00 IST (UTC+1)				Venue: Semple Stadium
	Gls: K Hayes 1, D O'Donovan 1. Pts: A Gillane 6 (6f), D Byrnes 3 (1f), C Lynch 3, P Casey 3, S Flanagan 2, G Hegarty 2, W O’Donoghue 1, G Mulcahy 1, D Reidy 1.	Report	Gls: S Kingston 1. Pts: P Horgan 5 (5f), J O’Connor 3, D Fitzgibbon 3, S Barrett 2, T O'Mahony 1, S Harnedy 1, R O'Flynn 1, S Kingston 1.	Referee: P O'Dwyer (Carlow); TV: Sky Sports

4 July 2021 Semi-final	Tipperary	3–23 (32) – (28) 2–22	Clare	Limerick
15:45 IST (UTC+1)		(HT: 1–13 – 2–11)		Venue: LIT Gaelic Grounds
	Gls: J Forde 1 (pen), S Callanan 1, M Breen 1. Pts: J Forde 8 (3fs, 1 sideline, 1 65), J O’Dwyer 4, J Morris 3, D McCormack 2, A Flynn 2, R Maher 1, S Callanan 1, M Breen 1, W Connors 1.	Report	Gls: T Kelly 1, I Galvin 1. Pts: T Kelly 9 (8fs), I Galvin 3, R Taylor 2, C Malone 2, A Shanagher 1, C Galvin 1, D Reidy 1, A McCarthy 1, J Conlon 1, R Hayes 1.	Referee: J Owens (Wexford); TV: RTÉ 2

==== Munster final ====
18 July 2021 Final	Limerick	2–29 (35) – (30) 3–21	Tipperary	Cork
16:15 IST (UTC+1)		(HT: 0–12 – 2–16)		Venue: Páirc Uí Chaoimh
	Gls: S Flanagan 1, K Hayes 1. Pts: A Gillane 6 (4f), T Morrissey 6 (1f), P Casey 5, D Byrnes 4 (2f, 1 65), S Flanagan 3, G Hegarty 3, C Lynch 1, D Reidy 1.	Report	Gls: J Morris 1, J O'Dwyer 1, M Kehoe 1. Pts: J Forde 11 (3f, 1 65), J Morris 2, J O’Dwyer 2, R Maher 1, D McCormack 1, S Callanan 1, S Kennedy 1, W Connors 1, M Breen 1.	Referee: P O'Dwyer (Carlow); Attendance: 7,000; TV: RTÉ 2

== All-Ireland Qualifiers ==
=== Bracket ===
Preliminary Round
Antrim	2–21
Laois	2–27

Round 1
Clare	2–25
Wexford	2–22
Laois	2–21
Waterford	3–23

Round 2
Cork	3–19
Clare	1–23
Galway	3–20
Waterford	1–30

All-Ireland Quarter-Finals
Cork
Waterford

=== Qualifiers preliminary round ===
The two teams beaten in the Leinster quarter-finals met in the preliminary round on 10 July with the winners going into the round 1 draw which was held on 12 July. Antrim were relegated to the 2022 Joe McDonagh Cup as a result of losing this match.

10 July 2021 Preliminary round	Antrim	2–21 (27) – (33) 2–27	Laois	Dublin
14:30 IST (UTC+1)				Venue: Parnell Park
	Gls: E O’Neill 2. Pts: C Clarke 8 (7fs, one 65), N McManus 4, K Molloy 3, C Cunning 2, J McNaughton 2 (1f), C Johnston 1, S Elliott 1.	Report	Gls: P Purcell 2. Pts: PJ Scully 9 (8fs, two sideline), J Kelly 4, P Delaney 3, W Dunphy 3, P Purcell 2, R King 2, C Collier 1, C McEvoy 1, F C-Fennell 1, C Dwyer 1.	Referee: S Cleere (Kilkenny)

=== Qualifiers round 1 ===
17 July 2021 Round 1	Clare	2–25 (31) – (28) 2–22	Wexford	Thurles
13:30 IST (UTC+1)				Venue: Semple Stadium
	Gls: C Malone 1, G Cooney 1. Pts: T Kelly 9 (7f), A McCarthy 3, D Reidy 3, R Taylor 3, A Shanagher 2, M Rodgers 2, D Ryan 1, C Malone 1, R Hayes 1.	Report	Gls: L Chin 1, D O'Keeffe 1. Pts: L Chin 12 (9f, 1'65); C Dunbar 5, C McDonald 2, R O'Connor 2, L Óg McGovern 1.	Referee: F Horgan (Tipperary)

17 July 2021 Round 1	Laois	2–21 (27) – (32) 3–23	Waterford	Kilkenny
14:00 IST (UTC+1)				Venue: Nowlan Park
	Gls: P Purcell 1, C Comerford 1. Pts: PJ Scully 0–10 (9f, 1 sideline), P Purcell 4, C Dwyer 2, E Rowland 1 (f), P Delaney 1, C Collier 1, J Keyes 1, A Dunphy 1.	Report	Gls: Stephen Bennett 1, P Curran 1, K Moran 1. Pts: Stephen Bennett 8 (7f, 1 ’65), D Hutchinson 3, P Curran 2, C Lyons 2, A Gleeson 2, I Daly 1, N Montgonery 1, K Moran 1, J Prendergast 1, J Fagan 1, D Lyons 1.	Referee: L Gordon (Galway)

=== Qualifiers round 2 ===
24 July 2021 Round 2	Waterford	1–30 (33) – (29) 3–20	Galway	Thurles
14:00 IST (UTC+1)				Venue: Semple Stadium
	Gls: J Fagan 1. Pts: Stephen Bennett 11 (7f, 1 '65), J Barron 4, A Gleeson 3 (1 sdl), J Fagan 2, P Curran 2, J Prendergast 2, C Lyons 2, S Bennett 1, P Hogan 1, K Bennett 1, M Kiely 1.	Report	Gls: J Flynn 2, C Mannion 1. Pts: J Canning 9 (8f), C Whelan 3, E Niland 2, C Cooney 1, J Cooney 1, J Coen 1, J Flynn 1, A Tuohy 1, B Concannon 1.	Referee: Sean Stack (Dublin); TV: Sky Sports

24 July 2021 Round 2	Cork	3–19 (28) – (26) 1–23	Clare	Limerick
16:30 IST (UTC+1)				Venue: Gaelic Grounds
	Gls: S Barrett 1, S Kingston 1, J O'Connor 1. Pts: P Horgan 10 (4fs, 3 65s); D Fitzgibbon 2, S Harnedy 2; L Meade 1, R O’Flynn 1, S Barrett 1, S Kingston 1; A Connolly 1.	Report	Gls: T Kelly 1. Pts: T Kelly 11 (1–0 pen, 8fs); C Malone 3; A McCarthy 2; R Hayes 1, D Ryan 1, D McInerney 1, C Galvin 1, I Galvin 1, R Taylor 1, S Golden 1.	Referee: J Keenan (Wicklow); TV: Sky Sports

== Bracket ==
Quarter-finals
Dublin	0–24
Cork	2–26
Tipperary	2–27
Waterford	4–28

Semi-finals
Kilkenny	1–32
Cork	1–37
Limerick	1–25
Waterford	0–17

Final
Cork	1–22
Limerick	3–32

== Quarter-finals ==
The beaten Leinster and Munster finalists played the two winners of round two of the qualifiers. The draw was made on 26 July.

31 July 2021 Quarter-final	Tipperary	2–27 (33) – (40) 4–28	Waterford	Cork
13:30 IST (UTC+1)				Venue: Páirc Uí Chaoimh
	Gls: S Callanan 2. Pts: J Forde 12 (7f, 2 ’65), J O’Dwyer 4, M Breen 3, R Maher 3, J McGrath 2, N McGrath 1, M Kehoe 1, W Connors 1.	Report	Gls: D Hutchinson 1, Stephen Bennett 1 (pen), A Gleeson 1, N Montgomery 1. Pts: J Barron 4, D Hutchinson 3, Stephen Bennett 3 (1f), A Gleeson 3 (2 sideline), P Hogan 3, N Montgomery 2, K Bennett 2, M Kiely 2, J Fagan, 2, S McNulty 1, C Lyons 1, P Curran 1, C Dunford 1.	Referee: C Lyons (Cork); TV: RTÉ2

31 July 2021 Quarter-final	Dublin	0–24 (24) – (32) 2–26	Cork	Thurles
19:00 IST (UTC+1)				Venue: Semple Stadium
	Pts: D Burke 13 (7f, 1 65), C O'Sullivan 3, C Burke 2, D Sutcliffe 2, L Rushe 1, R McBride 1, C Boland 1, J Malone 1.	Report	Gls: T O'Mahony 1, S Kingston 1. Pts: P Horgan 12 (8fs, 1 65), S Harnedy 4, J O'Connor 3, R O'Flynn 2, C Cahalane 1, S Barrett 1, N O'Leary 1, T O'Mahony 1, A Connolly 1.	Referee: J Owens (Wexford); TV: Sky Sports

== Semi-finals ==
7 August 2021 Semi-final	Limerick	1–25 (28) – (17) 0–17	Waterford	Dublin
17:30 IST (UTC+1)				Venue: Croke Park
	Gls: A Gillane 1. Pts: A Gillane 5 (4f), T Morrissey 5, S Flanagan 4, C Lynch 3, D Byrnes 3 (2f), P Casey 2, W O’Donoghue 1, G Hegarty 1, D O’Donovan 1 (f).	Report	Pts: Stephen Bennett 6 (5f), A Gleeson 4 (1 sl, 1f), D Hutchinson 2, C Lyons 2, J Barron 2, K Bennett 1.	Referee: J Keenan (Wicklow); Attendance: 24,000; TV: RTÉ2; Sky Sports

8 August 2021 Semi-final	Kilkenny	1–32 (35) – (40) 1–37 (a.e.t.)	Cork	Dublin
15:30 IST (UTC+1)				Venue: Croke Park
	Gls: A Mullen 1. Pts: TJ Reid 13 (11f, 1 65), ECody 4, B Ryan 4, AA Mullen 3, Murphy 2, R Hogan 1, R Reid 1, J Maher 1, P Walsh 1, M Carey 1, C Fogarty 1	Report	Gls: J O'Connor 1. Pts: P Horgan 15 (9f), S Kingston 7, J O’Connor 3, A Cadogan 3, R O’Flynn 2, S Harnedy 2, S Barrett 1, M Coleman 1, D Fitzgibbon 1, N O’Leary 1, D Dalton 1	Referee: F Horgan (Tipperary); Attendance: 24,000; TV: RTÉ2; Sky Sports

== Final ==
RTÉ, Sky Sports

22 August 2021
15:30 IST (UTC+1)
All-Ireland Final

Report

Limerick	3–32 (41) – (25) 1–22	Cork
(HT: 3–18 (27) – (14) 1–11)
Gls: G Hegarty 2, A Gillane 1. Pts: A Gillane 6 (3f), C Lynch 6, P Casey 5, T Morrissey 3, G Hegarty 2, D Byrnes 2 (1f), D Hannon 2, B Nash 1, D O'Donovan 1, S Flanagan 1, G Mulcahy 1, D Reidy 1, P Ryan 1.		Gls: S Kingston 1. Pts: P Horgan 12 (10f), S Harnedy 4, N O'Leary 1, M Coleman 1 (f), L Meade 1, J O'Connor 1, S Barrett 1, A Cadogan 1.

Croke Park, Dublin
Referee: Fergal Horgan (Tipperary)
Attendance: 40,000

== Statistics ==
=== Top scorers ===
Top scorer overall

Rank	Player	Club	Tally	Total	Matches	Average
1	Patrick Horgan	Cork	0–54	54	5	10.80
2	Tony Kelly	Clare	3–41	50	4	12.50
3	Stephen Bennett	Waterford	2–40	46	5	9.20
4	T. J. Reid	Kilkenny	1–39	42	3	14.00
5	Donal Burke	Dublin	0–40	40	4	10.00
6	Lee Chin	Wexford	2–28	34	3	11.33
6	Jason Forde	Tipperary	1–31	34	3	11.33
8	Aaron Gillane	Limerick	2–23	29	4	7.25
9	P. J. Scully	Laois	0–27	27	3	9.00
10	Shane Kingston	Cork	4-09	21	5	4.20

In a single game

Rank	Player	Club	Tally	Total	Opposition
1	T. J. Reid	Kilkenny	0–16	16	Wexford
2	Tony Kelly	Clare	1–12	15	Waterford
2	Lee Chin	Wexford	1–12	15	Clare
2	Patrick Horgan	Cork	0–15	15	Kilkenny
5	Tony Kelly	Clare	1–11	14	Cork
5	Lee Chin	Wexford	0–14	14	Kilkenny
7	T. J. Reid	Kilkenny	1–10	13	Dublin
7	T. J. Reid	Kilkenny	0–13	13	Cork
7	Donal Burke	Dublin	0–13	13	Cork
10	Tony Kelly	Clare	1-09	12	Tipperary
10	Patrick Horgan	Cork	0–12	12	Limerick
10	Jason Forde	Tipperary	0–12	12	Waterford
10	Stephen Bennett	Waterford	0–12	12	Clare
10	Patrick Horgan	Cork	0–12	12	Dublin

== Miscellaneous ==
- Limerick won a Munster Senior Hurling Championship three-in-a-row for the first time since 1934–1935–1936.
- Kilkenny's sixth year in a row without an All-Ireland senior title, equalling their title drought of 1994–1999.
- Cork's sixteenth year in a row without an All-Ireland senior title, surpassing their title drought of 1904–1918.
- It was the first ever All-Ireland final between Cork and Limerick.
- It was the first Munster final between Limerick and Tipperary since 2019.
- It was the first Leinster final between Dublin and Kilkenny since 2014.
- It was the first Joe McDonagh Cup final between Antrim and Kerry since 2020.
- Limerick scored 3–32 (41 points) in the All-Ireland final, the highest ever score in a final.
- It is the first time since Kilkenny in 2014–2015 that a county team won back-to-back All Ireland Hurling Championship titles.
- Limerick retained the All-Ireland Senior Hurling Championship for the first time in their history. This was their tenth title, making them the first county outside the Big Three to reach double figures.
- Limerick became the 6th county in history to win back-to-back All-Ireland hurling titles after Kilkenny, Cork, Tipperary, Galway and Wexford.
- Cork reached the final for the first time since 2013.
- Two new scoring feats were achieved on 24 July. Joe Canning surpassed Henry Shefflin's record haul to become the all-time top championship scorer. Patrick Horgan became the third player, after Canning and Shefflin, to have broken the 500-point barrier.
- Limerick played against Tipperary, Waterford and Cork twice (Munster Semi-final and All-Ireland Final) to retain the Liam MacCarthy cup, the first time — and only time, to date — that any county won a championship playing only teams from a single province, in this case all Munster opposition.
- Limerick had eleven players represented on The Sunday Game team of the year, a first for any male intercounty team in both Hurling and Gaelic Football, beating the previous record of nine representatives held by both Limerick in 2020 and Kilkenny in 2008.

== Awards ==
Sunday Game Team of the Year

The Sunday Game team of the year was picked 22 August on the night of the final. The panel consisting of Jackie Tyrrell, Brendan Cummins, Shane Dowling and Ursula Jacob chose Cian Lynch as the Sunday game player of the year.

1. Eoin Murphy (Kilkenny)
2. Sean Finn (Limerick)
3. Conor Prunty (Waterford)
4. Barry Nash (Limerick)
5. Diarmuid Byrnes (Limerick)
6. Declan Hannon (Limerick)
7. Kyle Hayes (Limerick)
8. William O’Donoghue (Limerick)
9. Tony Kelly (Clare)
10. Jack O’Connor (Cork)
11. Cian Lynch (Limerick)
12. Tom Morrissey (Limerick)
13. Aaron Gillane (Limerick)
14. Seamus Flanagan (Limerick)
15. Peter Casey (Limerick)

All Star Team of the Year

On 9 December, the All-Stars winners were announced with Limerick having a record twelve players named on the team. Its the first time that a county has reached double figures in the final 15. On 10 December during a televised special on RTÉ, Cian Lynch was named as the All Stars Hurler of the Year with Eoin Cody named the All Stars Young Hurler of the Year.

Pos.	Player	Team	Appearances
GK	Eoin Murphy	Kilkenny	3
RCB	Seán Finn	Limerick	4
FB	Conor Prunty	Waterford	1
LCB	Barry Nash	Limerick	1
RWB	Diarmaid Byrnes	Limerick	2
CB	Declan Hannon	Limerick	2
LWB	Kyle Hayes	Limerick	2
MD	William O'Donoghue	Limerick	1
MD	Darragh O'Donovan	Limerick	1
RWF	Gearóid Hegarty	Limerick	2
CF	Cian Lynch^{HOTY}	Limerick	3
LWF	Tom Morrissey	Limerick	2
RCF	Tony Kelly	Clare	3
FF	Séamus Flanagan	Limerick	1
LCF	Peter Casey	Limerick	1
