= 2021 Munster Senior Hurling Championship final =

- Event: 2021 Munster Senior Hurling Championship
| Limerick | Tipperary |
| 2–29 | 3–21 |
- Date: 18 July 2021
- Venue: Páirc Uí Chaoimh, Cork City
- Referee: Paud O'’Dwyer (Carlow)
- Attendance: 7,000
- Weather: Sunny (26 Degrees)

The 2021 Munster Senior Hurling Championship final was a hurling match that was played on 18 July at Páirc Uí Chaoimh in Cork City. It was contested by defending champions Limerick and Tipperary.

It was the first Munster hurling final at Páirc Uí Chaoimh since it reopened in 2017 after redevelopment.

Due to COVID-19 restrictions, only 7,000 were able to attend the match.

The game was televised live on RTÉ 2 as part of The Sunday Game, presented by Joanne Cantwell, with analysis by Dónal Óg Cusack and Henry Shefflin. Commentary on the game was provided by Marty Morrissey alongside Michael Duignan.

Limerick, captained by Declan Hannon, won the game by 2-29 to 3-21 to retain the title for the third year in a row.

== Match ==
=== Summary ===
The match was played in very sunny conditions with temperatures of 26 degrees. Jake Morris got a goal for Tipperary after four minutes when he ran in on the left before shooting low to the right corner of the net. After 19 minutes John O'Dwyer broke onto a ball and ran in on the left before shooting to the right corner of the net for a second Tipperary goal and put them into a 2-08 to 0-07 lead. Tipperary had a 10 point lead at half-time on a 2-16 to 0-12 scoreline and also had eight wides in the first half.

In the second half Limerick came back into the game and led by two points at the second-half water break after outscoring Tipperary by 1-10 to 0-1 in that third quarter. Séamus Flanagan had got a goal for Limerick in the 42nd minute when he followed up to push the ball over the line from close range after Barry Hogan had made a save from an Aaron Gillane shot. Kyle Hayes scored a second goal for Limerick in the 55th minute, running from inside his own half down the left before cutting inside and shooting low to the net to put Limerick five ahead. They were eight ahead when substitute Mark Kehoe scored a third goal for Tipperary late on with a shot to left corner of the net, with Limerick going on to win by five and retain the Munster title.

=== Details ===
18 July
16:15
Final

| Tipperary | 3–21 – 2–29 | Limerick |
|---|---|---|
| Jason Forde 0-11 (4f), John O'Dwyer 1-2, Jake Morris 1-2, Mark Kehoe 1-0, Ronan Maher, Seamus Kennedy, Michael Breen, Dan McCormack, Seamus Callanan Willie Connors all 0-1 | Report; Match Programme | Seamus Flanagan 1-3, Aaron Gillane 0-6 (4f), Tom Morrissey 0-6 (1f), Peter Casey 0-5, Diarmaid Byrnes 0-4 (2f, 1 65), Kyle Hayes 1-0, Gearóid Hegarty 0-3, Cian Lynch 0-1, David Reidy 0-1 |

Páirc Uí Chaoimh, Cork
Referee: Paud O'Dwyer (Carlow)

== See also ==
- Limerick–Tipperary hurling rivalry
