= Joe O'Grady (hurler) =

Irish hurler

Personal information
- Native name: Seosamh Ó Gráda (Irish)
- Nickname: Twager
- Born: 1892 Limerick, Ireland
- Died: September 1947 (aged 55) London, England

Sport
- Sport: Hurling
- Position: Forward
Clubs
- Years: Club
- Commercials; Claughaun
Club titles
- Limerick titles: 5
Inter-county
- Years: County
- 1916-1923: Limerick
Inter-county titles
- Munster titles: 1
- All-Irelands: 0

Joseph O'Grady (1892 - September 1947) was an Irish hurler. His career included success at club level with Claughaun and at inter-county level with the Limerick senior hurling team.

== Playing career ==
During his schooldays, O'Grady became a member of the Commercials junior team. He joined the Claughaun club after it was reformed in 1913, and won five county senior championship medals in the 12 years between 1914 and 1926. O'Grady was drafted onto the Limerick junior team for the 1915 Munster Junior Championship before receiving a call-up to the senior team the following year. After beginning his career as a goalkeeper, he was later switched to the forwards and won a Munster Championship medal in 1923 before losing to Galway in the All-Ireland final.

== Honours ==
Claughaun

- Limerick Senior Hurling Championship (5): 1914, 1915, 1916, 1918, 1926

Limerick

- Munster Senior Hurling Championship (1): 1923
