= Micky Fitzgibbon =

Irish hurler

Personal information
- Native name: Mícheál Mac Giobúin (Irish)
- Born: 9 September 1898 Caherconlish, County Limerick, Ireland
- Died: December 1975 (aged 77) Limerick, Ireland

Sport
- Sport: Hurling
- Position: Goalkeeper
Club
- Years: Club
- Young Irelands
Club titles
- Limerick titles: 5
Inter-county
- Years: County
- 1923-1933: Limerick
Inter-county titles
- Munster titles: 2
- All-Irelands: 0
- NHL: 0

Michael Fitzgibbon (9 September 1898 - December 1975) was an Irish hurler. His career included success at club level with Young Irelands, at inter-county level with Limerick and at inter-provincial level with Munster.

== Honours ==
Young Irelands

- Limerick Senior Hurling Championship (5): 1920, 1922, 1928, 1930, 1932

Limerick

- Munster Senior Hurling Championship (2): 1923, 1933 (c)

Munster

- Railway Cup (4): 1928, 1929, 1930, 1931

Sporting positions
Preceded by Timmy Ryan	Limerick Senior Hurling Captain; 1933	Succeeded by Timmy Ryan
