= Willie Hough =

Irish hurler (1892–1976)

Personal information
- Native name: Liam Ó hEochaidh (Irish)
- Born: 4 May 1892 Monagea, County Limerick, Ireland
- Died: 13 April 1976 (aged 83) Dooradoyle, Limerick, Ireland
- Occupation: National school teacher

Sport
- Sport: Hurling
- Position: Centre-back
Clubs
- Years: Club
- Monagea; St Stephens's; Collegians; Newcastle West
Club titles
- Limerick titles: 2
Inter-county
- Years: County
- 1913 1915-1929: Waterford; Limerick
Inter-county titles
- Munster titles: 3
- All-Irelands: 2
- NHL: 0

William Hough (4 May 1892 – 13 April 1976) was an Irish hurler. At club level he played with Monagea, St Stephen's and Newcastle West, and at inter-county level with the Limerick senior hurling team. Hough captained Limerick to the All-Ireland SHC title in 1918.

== Club career ==
Hough made his first appearance on the club scene with Monagea in a game against Ballingarry in 1910. The club later disbanded, however, by that stage Hough was living in Waterford and lined out with St Stephen's team. He won back-to-back Waterford SHC medals in 1913 and 1914. Hough subsequently moved to Cork and played with the Collegains club, before transferring to Newcastle West. He won his first Limerick SHC medal in 1917, following a 3–04 to 3–01 win over Young Irelands, before claiming a second winners' medal in 1925.

== Inter-county career ==
Hough first appeared on the inter-county scene as captain of the Waterford senior hurling team in 1913. He declined an invitation to line out with Cork the following year, having moved there for employment, however, he made his Limerick debut in 1915. Success at club level resulted in Hough assuming the Limerick captaincy in 1918. He won his first Munster SHC medal that year, after an 11–03 to 1–02 win over Clare in the final. Hough was at centre-back when he captained Limerick to a 9–05 to 1–03 win over Wexford in the 1918 All-Ireland SHC final. The half-back line of Hough, Jack Keane and Dinny Lanigan was known for its effectiveness and was nicknamed the 'Hindenburg Line'.

Hough won his second Munster SHC medal after a 5–02 to 1–02 win over Cork in the War of Independence-delayed Munster final in May 1922. The 1921 All-Ireland SHC final was delayed by 18 months, however, Hough collected a second winners' medal as Dublin were beaten by 8–05 to 3–02.

After surrendering their titles the following year, Hough's Limerick returned to claim their third Munster SHC title in six years in 1923, following a 2–03 to 1–00 win over Tipperary in the final. The 1923 All-Ireland SHC final resulted in a 7–03 to 4–05 win for Galway over Limerick. Hough again captained Limeick during their unsuccessful Munster SHC campaign in 1926. He retired from inter-county hurling shortly after this, however, he made a return to inter-county activity for a Munster SHC game against Waterford in 1929.

== Personal life and death ==
Hough was born and raised in Monagea, County Limerick. His father, William Hough Snr, played both hurling and Gaelic football in the early years of the Gaelic Athletic Association (GAA) and was chairman of the West Limerick Board from 1902 until 1910. Hough was educated locally and later attended the De La Salle College in Waterford where he trained as a national school teacher. His first teaching position was in Baltimore, West Cork. Hough took up a teaching post in Monagea National School in 1914, before serving as principal of the school from 1918 until his retirement in 1957.

After his playing career had ended, Hough remained active in the GAA. He was an inter-county referee and took charge of many National Hurling League and Munster SHC games. Hough served as vice-chairman of the West Limerick Board from 1924 until 1928. He was appointed treasurer of the Munster Council in 1936 and held the position for over 25 years.

Hough died on 13 April 1976, at the age of 83.

== Honours ==
St Stephens

- Waterford Senior Hurling Championship (2): 1913, 1914

Newcastle West

- Limerick Senior Hurling Championship (2): 1917 (c), 1925

Limerick

- All-Ireland Senior Hurling Championship (1): 1918 (c), 1921
- Munster Senior Hurling Championship (1): 1918 (c), 1921, 1923

Sporting positions
Preceded by	Waterford Senior Hurling Captain; 1913	Succeeded by
Preceded by	Limerick Senior Hurling Captain; 1918	Succeeded by
Preceded by	Limerick Senior Hurling Captain; 1926	Succeeded by
Achievements
Preceded by John Ryan	All-Ireland Senior Hurling winning captain 1918	Succeeded by Jimmy Kennedy
