= Jack Keane (hurler) =

Irish hurler

Personal information
- Native name: Seán Ó Catháin (Irish)
- Born: 19 April 1892 Castleconnell, County Limerick, Ireland
- Died: 24 April 1978 (aged 86) Dooradoyle, Limerick, Ireland
- Occupation: Farmer

Sport
- Sport: Hurling
- Position: Right wing-back
Clubs
- Years: Club
- Castleconnell; Young Irelands; Ahane
Club titles
- Limerick titles: 2
Inter-county
- Years: County
- 1912-1927: Limerick
Inter-county titles
- Munster titles: 3
- All-Irelands: 2

John Keane (19 April 1892 – 24 April 1978) was an Irish hurler. His championship career with the Limerick senior team lasted from 1912 until 1927.

Born in Castleconnell, County Limerick, Keane first played competitive hurling in various club tournament games in his youth. After a year in the United States he returned to Ireland and joined the Castleconnell club. After the club failed to field a championship team in 1918, Keane joined the Young Irelands club. He won county senior championship medals in 1920 and 1922, before ending his career with the newly founded Ahane club.

Keane made his senior debut for Limerick in a tournament game in 1912 and quickly established himself as a regular member of the team. His partnership with Willie Hough and Dinny Lanigan in the half-back line became known as the Hindenburg Line of hurling. Over the course of a fifteen-year inter-county career he won All-Ireland medals in 1918 and 1921, as well as three Munster medals. Keane retired from inter-county hurling following Limerick's exit from the 1927 championship. Keane was also involved as a selector for the Limerick senior team during the 30s, with Limerick winning the championship in 1934 and 1936.

== Honours ==
Young Irelands

- Limerick Senior Hurling Championship (2): 1920, 1922

Limerick

- All-Ireland Senior Hurling Championship (2): 1918, 1921
- Munster Senior Hurling Championship (3): 1918, 1921, 1923
