= Bob McConkey =

Irish hurler (1895–1961)

Robert McConkey
Personal information
- Native name: Roibéard Mac Concaigh (Irish)
- Born: 11 January 1895 Killaloe, County Clare, Ireland
- Died: 5 January 1961 (aged 66) O'Connell Avenue, Limerick, Ireland
- Occupation: Carpenter

Sport
- Sport: Hurling
- Position: Full-forward
Clubs
- Years: Club
- St Patrick's; Young Irelands
Club titles
- Limerick titles: 5
Inter-county
- Years: County
- 1918–1934: Limerick
Inter-county titles
- Munster titles: 4
- All-Irelands: 3
- NHL: 0

Robert McConkey (11 January 1895 – 5 January 1961) was an Irish hurler. His championship career at the senior level with the Limerick county team spanned sixteen years from 1918 until 1934.

McConkey first played competitive hurling with the St Patrick's club in Limerick. He later joined the Young Irelands club and won five county senior championship medals between 1920 and 1932.

Impressive displays at the club level brought McConkey to the attention of the Limerick senior team selectors and he was quickly added to the team. Over the course of a sixteen-year period, he won three All-Ireland medals, beginning with his first in 1918, a second as captain of the team in 1921 and a third and final winners' medal in 1934. McConkey also won four Munster medals.

After being chosen on the Munster inter-provincial team for the first time in 1927, McConkey was an automatic choice on the panel for two seasons. During that time he won one Railway Cup medal.

== Honours ==
Young Irelands

- Limerick Senior Hurling Championship (5): 1920, 1922, 1928, 1930, 1932

Limerick

- All-Ireland Senior Hurling Championship (3): 1918, 1921 (c), 1934
- Munster Senior Hurling Championship (4): 1918, 1921 (c), 1923, 1934

Munster

- Railway Cup (1): 1928

Sporting positions
Preceded by	Limerick Senior Hurling Captain; 1921	Succeeded by
Achievements
Preceded by Bob Mockler	All-Ireland SHC winning captain 1921	Succeeded by Wattie Dunphy
