= 1940 Limerick Senior Hurling Championship =

Annual hurling competition season

- Champions: Croom (5th title); Jim Roche (captain)
- Runners-up: Ahane; Mick Mackey (captain)

The 1940 Limerick Senior Hurling Championship was the 46th staging of the Limerick Senior Hurling Championship since its establishment by the Limerick County Board in 1887.

Ahane were the defending champions.

Croom won the championship after a 4–02 to 3–01 defeat of Ahane in the final. It was their fifth championship title overall and their first title since 1929. It was Ahane's first defeat in the championship since 1932.

== Championship statistics ==
=== Miscellaneous ===
- Croom win their first time since 1929.
