= 1927 Limerick Senior Hurling Championship =

Annual hurling competition season

- Champions: Fedamore (5th title)
- Runners-up: Young Irelands

The 1927 Limerick Senior Hurling Championship was the 33rd staging of the Limerick Senior Hurling Championship since its establishment by the Limerick County Board in 1887.

Claughaun were the defending champions.

Fedamore won the championship after a 5–10 to 1–03 defeat of Young Irelands in the final. It was their second championship title overall and their first championship title since 1912. It remains their last championship title.
