= Paddy Mackey (Limerick hurler) =

Irish hurler

Personal information
- Native name: Pádraig Mac Aodha (Irish)
- Born: 19 January 1920 Castleconnell, County Limerick, Ireland
- Died: 19 February 1941 (aged 21) Mallow, County Cork, Ireland
- Occupation: Soldier
- Height: 5 ft 10 in (178 cm)

Sport
- Sport: Hurling
- Position: Right corner-forward
Club
- Years: Club
- Ahane
Inter-county
- Years: County
- 1940–1941: Limerick
Inter-county titles
- Munster titles: 1
- All-Irelands: 1
- NHL: 0

Patrick Mackey (19 January 1920 – 19 February 1941) was an Irish hurler. His brief career included All-Ireland Championship success with the Limerick senior hurling team.

== Playing career ==
Mackey first played hurling for the Ahane club, winning one Limerick County Championship medal. The 1939 Limerick Senior Hurling Championship success saw Mackey drafted onto the Limerick senior hurling team. In his one full season with the team, he won All-Ireland Championship honours as a substitute in the 1940 All-Ireland Hurling Championship, having earlier won a Munster Hurling Championship medal.

== Personal life and death ==
Mackey was born in Castleconnell, County Limerick, the fifth of eight children of John and Mary (née Carroll). His father, nicknamed Tyler, was a former captain of the Limerick senior hurling team who won two Munster Championship titles. Mackey's brothers, Mick and John, also hurled with Limerick. All three Mackey brothers were member of Limerick's 1940 All-Ireland Championship-winning team.

Mackey joined the Irish Army where he held the rank of corporal. He died on 19 February 1941 from uremia at the age of 21.

== Honours ==
Ahane

- Limerick Senior Hurling Championship (): 1939

Limerick

- All-Ireland Senior Hurling Championship (1): 1940
- Munster Senior Hurling Championship (1): 1940
