= Paddy McInerney =

Irish hurler

Personal information
- Native name: Pádraig Mac an Airchinnigh (Irish)
- Born: 30 January 1895 O'Callaghans Mills, County Clare, Ireland
- Died: 28 December 1982 (aged 87) Eddy County, New Mexico, United States
- Occupation: Publican

Sport
- Sport: Hurling
- Position: Corner-back
Club
- Years: Club
- 1912–1925: Young Irelands
Club titles
- Limerick titles: 2
Inter-county
- Years: County
- 1918–1925: Limerick
Inter-county titles
- Munster titles: 3
- All-Irelands: 2

Patrick McInerney (30 January 1895 – 28 December 1982) was an Irish hurler who played as a corner-back for the Tipperary senior team.

McInerney made his first appearance for the team during the 1918 championship and was a regular member of the starting fifteen until his emigration after the 1925 championship. During that time he won two All-Ireland SHC medals, three Munster SHC medals and one Thomond Feis medal. Paddy McInerney was a contemporary of Pa "Fowler" McInerney, also of O'Callihan's Mills, who won Senior County All-Ireland Hurling Championships with Clare in 1916 and Dublin in 1932.

At club level McInerney was a double county championship medalist with Young Irelands.

== Playing career ==
=== Club ===
McInerney played his club hurling with his local Young Irelands club. He won his first senior county title in 1920. The championship was suspended in 1921; however, McInerney added a second county medal to his collection in 1922.

=== Inter-county ===
McInerney first came to prominence on the inter-county scene with Limerick in the late 1910s. In 1918 he first tasted success as, for the second year in-a-row, Limerick reached the Munster final. Clare provided the opposition on that occasion, however, McInerney’s side were the better team on the day. The final score of 11-3 to 1-2 tells its own story as McInerney collected his first Munster title. The subsequent All-Ireland final saw Limerick take on Wexford. The first-half saw Limerick go on a goal-scoring spree as they took a half-time lead of 5-4 to 0-2. The goals continued in the second half as Limerick won the game by 9-5 to 1-3, giving McInerney his first All-Ireland medal.

In 1919 Limerick reached their third consecutive Munster final. Cork were the opponents on that occasion, however, the All-Ireland champions were humbled with a 3-5 to 1-6 defeat. McInerney’s side were heavily beaten by Cork again in the 1920 provincial decider.

In 1921 the Munster championship was affected by political strife. Because of this only Cork and Limerick participated with both sides contesting the provincial final for the third consecutive year. McInerney’s side avenged the defeats of the previous two years by beating Cork by 5-2 to 1-2. It was his second Munster title. The subsequent All-Ireland final pitted Limerick against Dublin. Once again, Limerick went on a goal-scoring rampage with captain Bob McConkey capturing four goals in all. Limerick went on to win the game by 8-5 to 3-2, giving McInerney a second All-Ireland medal.

Limerick surrendered their Munster crown to Tipperary after a replay in 1922, however, they reversed that defeat in 1923 with McInerney, who wa snow captain of the team, adding a third Munster medal to his collection. He later lined out in his third All-Ireland final as Galway provided the opposition. In spite of Galway playing in their very first All-Ireland final they had yet to win a title. Limerick looked likely to capture a third All-Ireland title in six years, however, for the very first time the All-Ireland title went to a team from Connacht.

The next few years saw Limerick go into decline in Munster and McInerney retired from inter-county hurling.

== Post-playing career ==
McInerney, like many of his contemporaries was forced to give up the game of hurling in an effort to find work. He emigrated to the United States in the 1920s and remained there for the rest of his life.

Paddy McInerney died in New Mexico in 1983.

Sporting positions
Preceded by Dinny Lanigan	Limerick Senior Hurling Captain; 1923	Succeeded by

== Sources ==
- Corry, Eoghan, The GAA Book of Lists (Hodder Headline Ireland, 2005).
- Fullam, Brendan, Captains of the Ash (Wolfhound Press, 2002).
