= 1929 Limerick Senior Hurling Championship =

Annual hurling competition season

- Champions: Croom (4th title)
- Runners-up: Cappamore

The 1929 Limerick Senior Hurling Championship was the 35th staging of the Limerick Senior Hurling Championship since its establishment by the Limerick County Board in 1887.

Young Irelands were the defending champions.

Croom won the championship after a 7–04 to 2–02 defeat of Cappamore in the final. It was their fourth championship title overall and their first title since 1924.
