= 1909 Limerick Senior Hurling Championship =

Annual hurling competition season

- Champions: Castleconnell (1st title); John Mackey (captain)
- Runners-up: Croom

The 1909 Limerick Senior Hurling Championship was the 18th staging of the Limerick Senior Hurling Championship since its establishment by the Limerick County Board in 1887.

Croom were the defending champions.

Castleconnell won the championship after a 9–12 to 3–10 defeat of Croom in the final. It remains their only championship title.
