= Gernot Süßmuth =

German violinist and politician

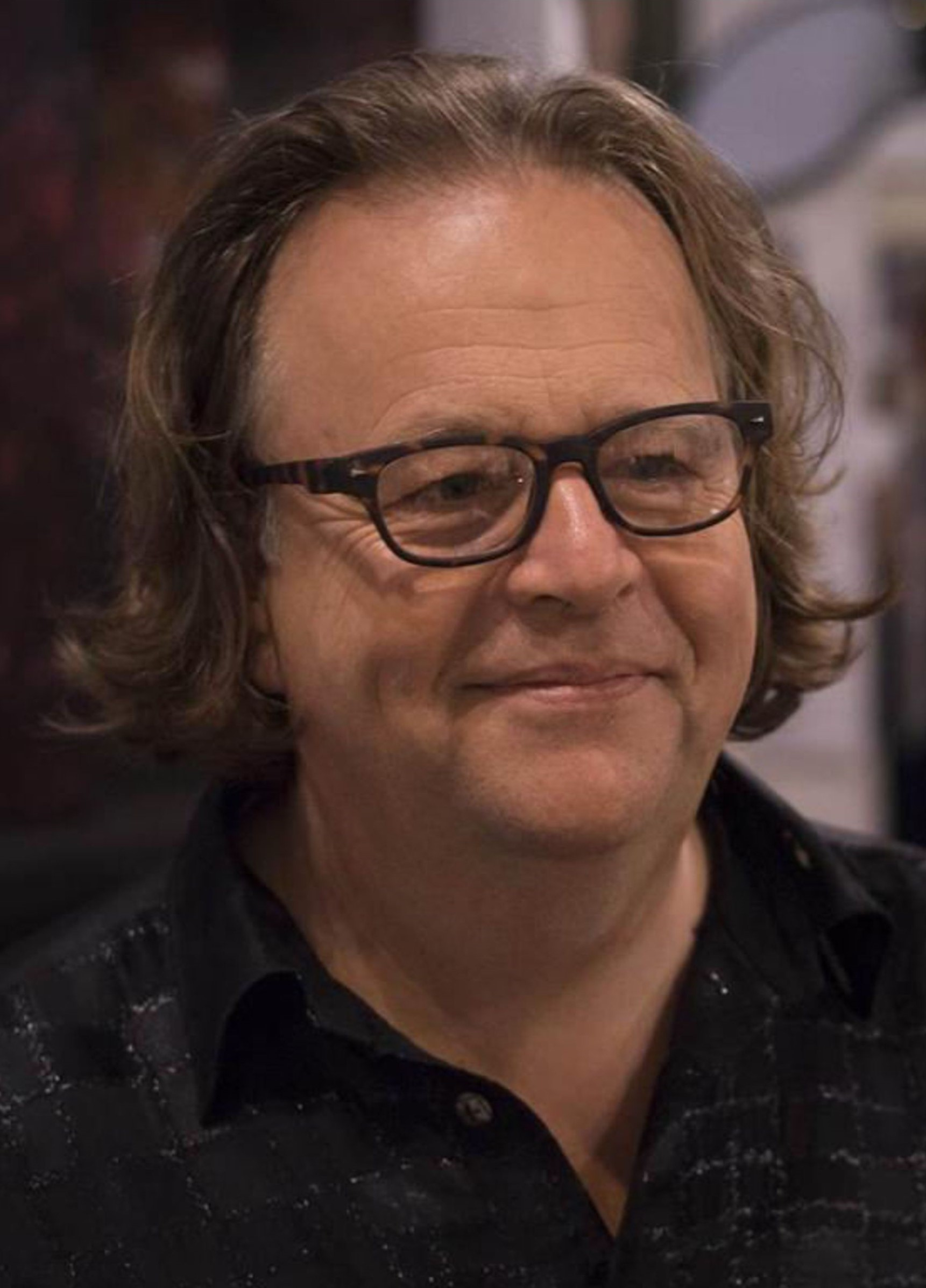
- Süßmuth in 2023

Background information
- Born: October 12, 1963 (age 62); Lauchhammer, Germany
- Genres: Classical music
- Instrument: violin
- Years active: 1979–present
- Formerly of: Petersen Quartet

Gernot Süßmuth (born 12 October 1963) is a German violinist and politician (BSW). He is first concertmaster of the Staatskapelle Weimar and honorary professor at the University of Music Franz Liszt Weimar.

== Life and work ==
As the son of Gunthard Süßmuth (head of the environmental department of Hoyerswerda), Gernot Süßmuth first attended the music school in Hoyerswerda. At the age of nine he was already performing as a soloist with an orchestra. This was followed by prizes at children's and youth competitions. At the age of 16 he studied at the Hanns Eisler Academy of Music in Berlin. He completed his violin studies in 1984 with a soloist diploma. In 1985 the Berlin Radio Symphony Orchestra hired him as concertmaster. From 2000 to 2002 he was concertmaster of the Staatskapelle Berlin. Since August 2002 he has been first concertmaster of the Staatskapelle Weimar.

Süßmuth is also a successful chamber musician. From 1983 to March 2000 he was a member of the Petersen Quartet, performed in major international concert halls and released numerous CDs, which have won awards including the Grand Prix Du Disc, the Echo Music Prize and the German Record Critics' Prize. At the turn of the millennium he founded the Aperto Piano Quartett with his former quartet colleague Hans-Jakob Eschenburg, and in 2008 the Waldstein Quartet with Mirijam Contzen, Ulrich Eichenauer and Peter Hörr. Süßmuth was artistic director of the European Union Chamber Orchestra until 2011 and concertmaster under Helmuth Rilling at the Bach Academy (Bach-Collegium Stuttgart) in Stuttgart from 2001 to 2014.

Concert tours have taken him as a conductor and soloist through Germany, to various countries in Central and South America and to England. He was concertmaster at the Oregon Bach Festival for many years. In 2012 he became director of the WestfalenClassics festival. In 2023 he was on a guest tour in China as orchestra conductor with the Camerata Salzburg.

In addition to his chamber music activities, he regularly appears as a soloist and with other renowned chamber music partners, including Steven Bishop, Paul Meyer, Daniel Barenboim, Norbert Brainin and Martin Lovett.

In 2018, Süßmuth founded the Thüringer Bach Collegium, with which he developed his own style of Bach interpretation as artistic director.

Süßmuth has devoted himself for many years to the training of young musicians at the music academies in Berlin and Weimar and in 2004 accepted an appointment as honorary professor at the Franz Liszt Academy of Music in Weimar. For several decades he has also worked as an orchestra conductor at the summer courses of the Werkgemeinschaft Musik.

Ludger Vollmer wrote a violin concerto for Gernot Süßmuth in 2020.

Süßmuth is married to the cellist Dagmar Spengler-Süßmuth. From his first marriage to the violinist Regina Süßmuth they have two children.

== Political involvement ==
Gernot Süßmuth joined the newly founded Sahra Wagenknecht Alliance (BSW) on 15 March 2024 and ran on the BSW state list for the state elections in Thuringia on 1 September 2024, in which the BSW entered the Landtag of Thuringia with 15 representatives. With 16th place on the list, Süßmuth became the first substitute. He is committed, among other things, to broad cultural support and strengthening of the independent theatre scene and socio-cultural institutions. For the 2025 German federal election, he was nominated as a direct candidate in constituency 192 (Erfurt – Weimar – Weimarer Land II). On 26 April 2025 Süßmuth and Katja Wolf were elected chairmen of the BSW Thuringia.

== Discography ==
CDs

- Schmidt Kowalski: Sinfonie Nr. 4 . Violinkonzert Nr. 2, mit dem SWR Rundfunkorchester, Naxos 2006
- Haydn: Symphonies and Divertimenti, mit der Sinfonia Classica, Landor Records 2008
- Franz Schubert: Sonaten für Violine und Klavier, Querstand 2012
- Jon Pescevich: At the Edge of Night, Centaur Records 2018

With the Thüringer Bach Collegium

- Johann Ernst IV. von Sachsen Weimar Concerti, Audite 2019
- Johann Bernhard Bach: Orchestral Suites, Audite 2019
- Anton Schweitzer: Die Auferstehung Christi & Missa Brevis – Cantata, Capriccio 2021
- VIRTUOSI, Audite 2021
- Johann Sebastian Bach: Weihnachtsoratorium, Rondeau Production 2021
- Locatelli: Introduttioni teatrali, Audite 2023

With the Petersen Quartet

- Beethoven: Streichquartette C-Moll Op. 18/4 und A-Moll Op. 132, Capriccio 1986
- Mozart: 3 preußische Quartette, Capriccio 1992
- Beethoven: Streichquartette Op. 59/2 , Op. 95, Capriccio 1993
- Grieg / Schumann, Streichquartette, Capriccio 1993
- Boccherini: Streichquartette, Capriccio 1993
- Boris Blacher: Streichquartette, EDA 1994
- Mozart: 6 Streichquartette „Haydn-Quartette“, Capriccio 1994
- Alban Berg, Leoš Janáček, Henri Dutilleux, Capriccio 1994
- Erwin Schulhoff: String Quartet, String Sextet, Violin Sonata, Duo For Violin And Cello, Capriccio 1995 (Deutscher Schallplattenpreis)
- Beethoven: Streichquartette F-Dur Op. 18/1 und Cis-Moll Op. 131, Capriccio 1995 (Grand Prix Académie Chartes Cros, Editor’s Choice des Gramophone und der Preis Choc 1995 von Le Monde de la Musique)
- Franz Schubert: Der Tod und das Mädchen / Siegfried Matthus: Das Mädchen und der Tod, Capriccio 1998 (Echo Preis)
- Beethoven: Streichquartett Op. 130 / Grosse Fuge Op. 133, Capriccio 1999
- Chamber Music: Beethoven, Grieg, Brahms, Capriccio 1999
- Karl Amadeus Hartmann: Funebre, ECM 2000
- Milhaud, Ravel, Chausson, Lekue: Songs & Chamber Music, Capriccio 2001 (Echo Preis)
