= 1931 Limerick Senior Hurling Championship =

Annual hurling competition season

- Champions: Ahane (1st title); Paddy Scanlan (captain)
- Runners-up: Croom

The 1931 Limerick Senior Hurling Championship was the 37th staging of the Limerick Senior Hurling Championship since its establishment by the Limerick County Board.

Young Irelands were the defending champions.

On 4 October 1931, Ahane won the championship after a 5–05 to 1–04 defeat of Croom in the final. It was their first ever championship title.

== Results ==
=== Final ===
4 October 1931 Final	Ahane	5–05 – 1–04	Croom	Gaelic Grounds, Limerick
