= 1910 Limerick Senior Hurling Championship =

Annual hurling competition season

- Champions: Young Irelands (2nd title); Tom Hayes (captain)
- Runners-up: Castleconnell

The 1910 Limerick Senior Hurling Championship was the 19th staging of the Limerick Senior Hurling Championship since its establishment by the Limerick County Board in 1887.

Castleconnell were the defending champions.

Young Irelands won the championship after a 4–02 to 4–01 defeat of Castleconnell in the final. It was their second championship title overall and their first title since 1902.
