= John Mackey (hurler) =

Limerick hurler

Personal information
- Native name: Seán Mac Aodha (Irish)
- Born: 28 August 1913 Castleconnell, County Limerick, Ireland
- Died: 3 May 1989 (aged 75) Broadstone, Dublin, Ireland
- Occupation: Health Board employee
- Height: 5 ft 10 in (178 cm)

Sport
- Sport: Hurling
- Position: Right wing-forward
Club
- Years: Club
- Ahane
Club titles
	Football	Hurling
Limerick titles	5	15
Inter-county
Years	County	Apps (scores)
1932–1948	Limerick	43
Inter-county titles
- Munster titles: 5
- All-Irelands: 3
- NHL: 5

John Mackey (28 August 1913 – 3 May 1989) was an Irish hurler who played as a right wing-forward at senior level for the Limerick county team.

Mackey is regarded as one of Limerick's all-time greatest players. He made his first appearance for the team as a substitute during the 1932 championship and was a regular member of the starting fifteen until his retirement after the 1948 championship. During that time he won three All-Ireland medals, five Munster medals and five National League medals. He ended up as an All-Ireland runner-up on two occasions.

At club level Mackey won a record-equaling fifteen county hurling championship and five county football championship medals with Ahane.

Mackey hailed from a hurling 'dynasty'. His father, John "Tyler" Mackey, was a former Limerick captain while his brothers, Mick and Paddy, also claimed All-Ireland honours.
