= Heidelberger Frühling Music Award =

German music award

- Awarded for: "individuals who have made substantial and lasting contributions within the classical music education sector."
- Sponsored by: HeidelbergCement
- Location: Heidelberg
- Country: Germany
- Reward: €10,000
- First award: 2013
- Website: www.heidelberger-fruehling.de/en/heidelberger-fruehling/programm/musikpreis/

The Heidelberger Frühling Music Award is an award given at the music festival Heidelberger Frühling in Heidelberg, Germany. The annually award is endowed with €10,000 and is awarded to creatives and journalists who have made a substantial and sustained contribution to bringing classical music to wider audiences, respectively to individuals who have made substantial and lasting contributions within the classical music education sector. The prize is donated by HeidelbergCement.

== Recipients ==
- 2013 Jörg Widmann, clarinetist, composer and conductor
- 2014 Eleonore Büning, music journalist
- 2015 Markus Hinterhäuser, pianist and cultural manager
- 2016 Christian Gerhaher, baritone
- 2017 Klaus Lauer, hotelier and festival director (Römerbad-Musiktage, Badenweiler Musiktage)
- 2018 Gabriela Montero, pianist
- 2019 John Gilhooly, director of Wigmore Hall
- 2020 Thomas Hampson, baritone
- 2023 Martin Grubinger, percussionist
