= 1904 Limerick Senior Hurling Championship =

Annual hurling competition season

- Champions: Cappamore (1st title)
- Runners-up: Ballingarry

The 1904 Limerick Senior Hurling Championship was the 14th staging of the Limerick Senior Hurling Championship since its establishment by the Limerick County Board in 1887.

Young Irelands were the defending champions.

Cappamore won the championship after a 3–07 to 1–05 defeat of Ballingarry in the final. It was their first ever championship title.
