= Mick Murphy (Limerick hurler) =

Irish hurler

Personal information
- Native name: Mícheál Ó Murchú (Irish)
- Born: 1897 Limerick, Ireland
- Died: 18 October 1955 (aged 58) Barna, County Galway, Ireland
- Occupation: Branch manager of Shell Oil
- Height: 6 ft 1 in (185 cm)

Sport
- Sport: Hurling
- Position: Goalkeeper
Clubs
- Years: Club
- St Patrick's; Young Irelands
Club titles
- Limerick titles: 5
Inter-county
- Years: County
- 1918-1928: Limerick
Inter-county titles
- Munster titles: 2
- All-Irelands: 2
- NHL: 0

Michael J. Murphy (1897 – 18 October 1955) was an Irish hurler who played as a goalkeeper for the Limerick senior team.

Born in Limerick, Murphy first played competitive hurling in his youth. He made his first impression on the inter-county scene when he joined the Limerick senior team during a golden age between 1918 and 1923. Murphy went on to play a key role for Limerick for over a decade, and won two All-Ireland medals and two Munster medals.

As a member of the Munster inter-provincial team on two occasions, Murphy won one Railway Cup medal. At club level he is a five-time championship medallist with Young Irelands. Murphy also lined out with St Patrick's.

== Honours ==
=== Player ===
Young Irelands

- Limerick Senior Club Hurling Championship (5): 1920, 1922, 1928, 1930, 1932

Limerick

- All-Ireland Senior Hurling Championship (2): 1918, 1921
- Munster Senior Hurling Championship (2): 1918, 1921

Munster

- Railway Cup (1): 1928
