= Paddy Mackey =

Paddy Mackey may refer to:

- Paddy Mackey (dual player) (1889–1948), Wexford hurler and Gaelic football player
- Paddy Mackey (Limerick hurler) (1920–1941)
