= 1928 Limerick Senior Hurling Championship =

Annual hurling competition season

- Champions: Young Irelands (5th title); Bob McConkey (captain)
- Runners-up: Rathkeale

The 1928 Limerick Senior Hurling Championship was the 34th staging of the Limerick Senior Hurling Championship since its establishment by the Limerick County Board in 1887.

Fedamore were the defending champions.

Young Irelands won the championship after a 5–07 to 2–01 defeat of Rathkeale in the final. It was their fifth championship title overall and their first title since 1922.
