= 1941 Limerick Senior Hurling Championship =

Annual hurling competition season

- Champions: Croom (6th title); Jim Roche (captain)
- Runners-up: Ahane; Mick Mackey (captain)

The 1941 Limerick Senior Hurling Championship was the 47th staging of the Limerick Senior Hurling Championship since its establishment by the Limerick County Board in 1887.

Croom were the defending champions.

Croom won the championship after a 4–02 to 4–01 defeat of Ahane in the final. It was their sixth championship title overall and their second title in succession. It remains their last championship triumph.
