= 1920 Limerick Senior Hurling Championship =

Annual hurling competition season

- Champions: Young Irelands (3rd title); Bob McConkey (captain)
- Runners-up: Newcastle West

The 1920 Limerick Senior Hurling Championship was the 28th staging of the Limerick Senior Hurling Championship since its establishment by the Limerick County Board in 1887.

Croom were the defending champions.

Young Irelands won the championship after a 5–04 to 0–01 defeat of Newcastle West in the final. It was their third championship title overall and their first title since 1910.
