= 1924 Limerick Senior Hurling Championship =

Annual hurling competition season

- Champions: Croom (3rd title)
- Runners-up: Fedamore

The 1924 Limerick Senior Hurling Championship was the 30th staging of the Limerick Senior Hurling Championship since its establishment by the Limerick County Board in 1887.

Young Irelands were the defending champions.

Croom won the championship after a 6–03 to 2–01 defeat of Fedamore in the final. It was their third championship title overall and their first title since 1919.
