= 1911 Limerick Senior Hurling Championship =

Annual hurling competition season

- Champions: Ballingarry (1st title)
- Runners-up: Fedamore

The 1911 Limerick Senior Hurling Championship was the 20th staging of the Limerick Senior Hurling Championship since its establishment by the Limerick County Board in 1887.

Young Irelands were the defending champions.

Ballingarry won the championship after a 4–02 to 1–02 defeat of Fedamore in the final. It remains their only championship triumph.
