= Wolfram Rieger =

German pianist

Wolfram Rieger is a German classical pianist, who is known internationally as accompanist of singers and in chamber music.

== Training ==
Born in Waldsassen, Rieger received his first piano lessons from his parents and later from Konrad Pfeiffer in Regensburg. He quickly developed a strong affection for song interpretation and therefore continued his studies at the Musikhochschule München with the lieder pianists Erik Werba and Helmut Deutsch. After graduating with distinction in 1987, he took part in the master classes of Elisabeth Schwarzkopf and Dietrich Fischer-Dieskau.

== Career ==
In 1987, Rieger started teaching at the Musikhochschule München where he became head of his own lieder class for singers and pianists in 1991. In 1993 and 1994, he accompanied the Lieder class at the Hochschule für Musik "Hanns Eisler" in Berlin. Since 1998, he has been leading his own Lieder class there as well. In addition, Rieger has on several occasions participated as an assistant in master classes by Schwarzkopf, Brigitte Fassbaender and Hans Hotter.

As an accompanist to Lieder recitals and in chamber music, Rieger regularly appears on numerous important concert stages in Europe, North America, the Middle East and the Far East. He has performed at the Schubertiade in Schwarzenberg, at the Concertgebouw in Amsterdam, Wigmore Hall in London, Carnegie Hall in New York City, the Konzerthaus in Vienna and the Salzburg Festival.

Rieger is well known as the regular pianist of Fassbaender, Fischer-Dieskau, Barbara Bonney, Juliane Banse, Michelle Breedt, Thomas Hampson, Olaf Bär, Peter Schreier, Matthias Goerne, Christoph Prégardien and as chamber music partner of the Cherubini Quartet, the Petersen Quartet and the Vogler Quartet.

In 1997, he received the medal of honour from the Franz Schubert Foundation of Barcelona.
