= Srnka =

Srnka is a surname. Notable people with the surname include:

- Jiří Srnka (1907–1982), Czech composer
- Miroslav Srnka (born 1975), Czech composer
