= 1905 Limerick Senior Hurling Championship =

Annual hurling competition season

- Champions: Caherline (2nd title)
- Runners-up: Rathkeale

The 1905 Limerick Senior Hurling Championship was the 15th staging of the Limerick Senior Hurling Championship since its establishment by the Limerick County Board in 1887.

Cappamore were the defending champions.

Caherline won the championship after a 3–05 to 2–02 defeat of Rathkeale in the final. It was their second championship title overall and their first title since 1896.
