= 1938 Limerick Senior Hurling Championship =

Annual hurling competition season

- Champions: Ahane (7th title); Mick Mackey (captain)
- Runners-up: Croom

The 1938 Limerick Senior Hurling Championship was the 44th staging of the Limerick Senior Hurling Championship since its establishment by the Limerick County Board.

Ahane were the defending champions.

On 30 October 1938, Ahane won the championship after a 4–05 to 2–02 defeat of Croom in the final. It was their seventh championship title overall and their sixth title in succession.

== Results ==
=== Final ===
30 October 1938 Final	Ahane	4–05 – 2–02	Croom	Gaelic Grounds, Limerick
