= 1926 Limerick Senior Hurling Championship =

Annual hurling competition season

- Champions: Claughaun (5th title); Pat Shanny (captain)
- Runners-up: Newcastle West

The 1926 Limerick Senior Hurling Championship was the 32nd staging of the Limerick Senior Hurling Championship since its establishment by the Limerick County Board in 1887.

Newcastle West were the defending champions.

On 17 October 1926, Claughaun won the championship after a 5–03 to 1–04 defeat of Newcastle West in the final. It was their fifth championship title overall and their first championship title since 1918.

== Results ==
=== Final ===
17 October 1926 Final	Claughaun	5–03 – 1–04	Newcastle West	Croom Sportsfield, Croom
				Referee: W Gleeson
