= Heidelberger Frühling =

German music festival

The Heidelberger Frühling was founded in 1997 as a classical music festival and has since developed into a year-round cultural institution that conceives and organises festivals, concert series and conferences with internationally established performers, ensembles, orchestras and speakers as well as support programmes for young artists. Around 47,700 visitors (2019) are reached at a total of over 120 events per year. Thorsten Schmidt has been the managing and artistic director since 1997. Heidelberger Frühling belongs to the festival region Rhein-Neckar.

== History ==
The first Heidelberger Frühling Musikfestival took place in 1996. After the first two years with the Philharmonisches Orchester Heidelberg under the direction of its general music director Thomas Kalb, the music festival became independent under its managing director Thorsten Schmidt. Heidelberger Frühling gGmbH was founded in March 2006. In 2010, the Stiftung Heidelberger Frühling was established (since 2021 Musikstiftung Heidelberg) and in 2021 the association Freundeskreis des Heidelberger Frühling e.V. celebrated its 20th anniversary. The 2020 and 2021 festival years had to be cancelled due to the coronavirus pandemic. In 2022, the festival celebrated its 25th anniversary.

Since the 2022/23 season, pianist Igor Levit has been Co-Artistic Director of the Heidelberger Frühling Musickfestival alongside Artistic Director Thorsten Schmidt.

== Events ==
=== Heidelberger Frühling Musikfestival ===
Every year since 1997, around 100 concerts and events have taken place over four weeks in March and April, featuring both international stars of the classical music world and up-and-coming artists, characterised by a discursive examination of music through innovative, unique programmes, formats and projects. Each festival edition has a central theme: e.g. Dialoge (2005), Das Eigene und das Fremde (2007), Ach Europa (2010), Freiheit wagen (2015), Wie wollen wir leben? (2019), FESTspiel (2022) or ZUSAMMEN (2023).

In 2022, the festival celebrated its 25th birthday after two cancelled years due to the pandemic. This year also saw the launch of the "re:start" programme with free admission concerts throughout Heidelberg, which reached over 10,000 people.

On 20 April 2022, the 2nd Piano Concerto by American composer William Bolcom was premiered by Igor Levit and the Mahler Chamber Orchestra under the direction of Elim Chan in the Aula of the New University of Heidelberg as part of the festival. The Heidelberger Frühling commission was sponsored by Dietrich Götze.

In 2024, the Heidelberger Frühling Musikfestival will take place from 15 March to 13 April under the motto "Brahms!" and is dedicated primarily to the chamber music and solo piano works of Johannes Brahms. The composer focus runs like a common thread through the entire 2023/24 Heidelberger Frühling season.

=== Heidelberger Frühling Streichquartettfest ===
The four-day Heidelberger Frühling Streichquartettfest has been taking place at the end of January since 2012. It is the first of its kind to focus solely on the string quartet genre. It has been part of the Heidelberger Frühling Musikfestival since 2005. Four to six string quartets are invited each year, with established quartets meeting young newcomers. The venue for the Streichquartettfest is the Alte Pädagogische Hochschule Heidelberg. Every two years, the String Quartet Competition of the Irene Steels-Wilsing Foundation is held at the beginning of the festival.

In 2024, the Streichquartettfest from 18 to 21 January will herald the start of the year-round Brahms focus of the Heidelberger Frühling.

=== Heidelberger Frühling Liedfestival ===
In June 2022, the Liedfestival celebrated its premiere, which revolves around the Lied genre. After a successful second edition in June 2023, the next Liedfestival will take place from 8 to 16 June 2024 and will also focus on the composer Johannes Brahms in its programme.

=== Heidelberger Frühling Wettbewerb "Das Lied" ===
The competition Heidelberger Frühling Wettbewerb "Das Lied" was launched by Thomas Quasthoff in 2009 and has quickly established itself as one of the most important singing competitions in the world. The aim is to promote great Lied singers of the younger generation. It also offers audiences, organisers, festivals and agencies the opportunity to discover the voices of tomorrow. In addition to prize money totalling 40,000 euros, the winners are also offered concerts in internationally renowned concert halls. Previously based in Berlin, the competition has been organised by Heidelberger Frühling since 2017.

The 2023 edition was won by 24-year-old tenor Laurence Kilsby from England and 33-year-old tenor Tae Hwan Yun from South Korea.

=== Heidelberger Frühling Kammermusik Plus ===
Since 2018, Heidelberger Frühling has been organising the year-round subscription series "Kammermusik Plus" with nine concerts featuring various chamber music ensembles from September to June. It emerged from the concert series organised by the Gesellschaft der Musik- und Kunstfreunde Heidelberg, which was founded in 1945 and dissolved in 2018. The venue is the Aula of the Old University of Heidelberg.

=== Heidelberger Frühling Musikkonferenz ===
Since 2013, Heidelberger Frühling has been organising a two-day conference for the concert and festival industry. Each edition of the Musikkonferenz is dedicated to a different topic.

- 2013: "Festivals 3.0 – a way to shape the future?", the opening keynote was held by Gerard Mortier
- 2014: "Creating something new instead of copy & paste", with architect and trained musician Daniel Libeskind, among others
- 2015: "Art is free – but for how much longer?"
- 2018: "The cult of the special – How a changing society is revolutionising the relationship between the music business and the audience"
- 2020 (hybrid): "What now? In search of the relevance of tomorrow" with Folkert Uhde, Holger Noltze and John Sloboda, among others

== Akademie ==
The Festivalakademie was founded in 2011 as the creative centre of Heidelberger Frühling. It comprised four areas: Lied (artistic director: Thomas Hampson), Chamber Music (artistic director: Igor Levit), Composition (successor to the Heidelberg Atelier, artistic director: Matthias Pintscher) and Music Journalism (artistic director: Eleonore Büning). Mentors from previous academy years were Barbara Bonney, Ian Bostridge, Brigitte Fassbaender, Graham Johnson, Thomas Quasthoff, Wolfram Rieger, Veronika Eberle, Ning Feng, Matan Porat, Thorleif Thedéen, Frederic Rzewski, Manuel Brug and Sophie Diesselhorst. There were also numerous specialist speakers from humanities disciplines.

Under the artistic direction of Thomas Hampson, who has been closely associated with Heidelberg and the Heidelberger Frühling since the "Wunderhorn Week" in 2006, the Liedakademie has developed into a year-round support programme for young singers and pianists. Cooperation partner is the Pierre Boulez Saal Berlin, whose Schubert Week is organised every January by Thomas Hampson with Liedakademie scholars.

== Lied focus ==
Heidelberg is known as the city of Lied – not least thanks to Clemens Brentano and Achim von Arnim's collection of Lieder Des Knaben Wunderhorn. This is why the Heidelberger Frühling has set itself the task of making the genre of the Lied accessible to a wider audience once again. The founding of the Heidelberger Frühling Liedzentrum in February 2016 bundles these activities.

In the past, almost all of the great Lied interpreters have performed in the Neckar city, including Annette Dasch, Jonas Kaufmann, Christine Schäfer, Christian Gerhaher, Christoph Prégardien, Thomas Hampson and many others.

The Liedzentrum's projects include one of the most renowned competitions for lieder singing – Thomas Quasthoff's competition "Das Lied", which has been held every two years since 2009 and has been held in Heidelberg since 2017 as the Heidelberger Frühling Wettbewerb "Das Lied".

In 2021, the digital project "Lied Me!" was released with nine short films that were created during the cultural lockdown in the 2020 coronavirus pandemic. The film was directed by Thomas Grube.

== Music education by young people for young people ==
Under the name "Classic Scouts", young people between the ages of 14 and 18 have been familiarising their peers with classical music and helping to shape the Heidelberger Frühling since 2008. In October 2015, the "Classic Scouts" were honoured with the ECHO Klassik award in the category for promoting young talent.

== Music Award of Heidelberger Frühling ==
The Music Award of Heidelberger Frühling has been awarded since 2013 and is endowed with 10,000 euros, donated by HeidelbergMaterials, the founding partner of Heidelberger Frühling. It is awarded to cultural professionals or cultural journalists who make a substantial and lasting contribution to the promotion of classical music. Previous winners are:

- 2013: Clarinettist, composer and conductor Jörg Widmann
- 2014: Music journalist Eleonore Büning
- 2015: Austrian pianist and cultural manager Markus Hinterhäuser
- 2016: Baritone Christian Gerhaher
- 2017: Hotelier and festival director Klaus Lauer (Römerbad-Musiktage, Badenweiler Musiktage)
- 2018: Pianist Gabriela Montero
- 2019: John Gilhooly (Director of Wigmore Hall)
- 2020/21: Baritone Thomas Hampson
- 2023: Percussionist Martin Grubinger

== Venues ==
The main venue for Heidelberger Frühling events is the Kongresshaus Stadthalle Heidelberg from the Wilhelminian era, which is currently being renovated. Other venues include the Aula of the New University of Heidelberg, the Aula of the Old University of Heidelberg, the Old Heidelberg University of Education and the Dezernat 16. In the past, the festival has used the atrium of the Heidelberger Druckmaschinen AG research and development centre, the Operon Auditorium European Laboratory for Molecular Biology, the Studio Villa Bosch, the Stadtgarten restaurant, the BASF SE Ludwigshafen Gesellschaftshaus and the Mantei bakery as unusual concert venues.

== Financing ==
The city of Heidelberg is a shareholder of Heidelberger Frühling gGmbH and, together with the state of Baden-Württemberg, provides around 25% of the budget via an annual subsidy; the remaining 75% or so is generated by Heidelberger Frühling through its own income (mainly from ticket sales), fundraising and sponsorship.

A key element of fundraising is the association Freundeskreis des Heidelberger Frühling e. V., which has been in existence since 2001 and in which more than 1000 companies and private individuals have joined together to support the festival on the part of Heidelberg's business community and citizens.

The main sponsors of the Heidelberger Frühling Musikfestival are Heidelberg Materials as a founding partner, MLP AG, Octapharma and SAP SE.
