= Thomas Hampson =

American opera singer

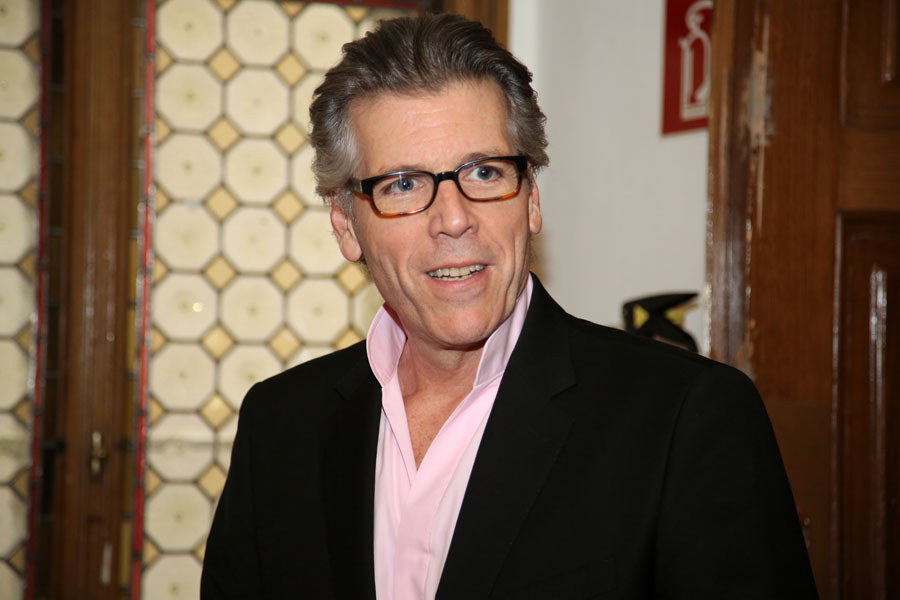
- Hampson in 2014
- Born: June 28, 1955 (age 71); Elkhart, Indiana, U.S.
- Occupation: Baritone
- Organizations: Opernhaus Zürich; Manhattan School of Music
- Awards: Edison Award; International Classical Music Awards

Walter Thomas Hampson (born June 28, 1955) is an American lyric baritone, a classical singer who has appeared world-wide in major opera houses and concert halls and made over 170 musical recordings.

Hampson's operatic repertoire spans a range of more than 80 roles, including the title roles in Mozart's Don Giovanni, Rossini's Guillaume Tell and Il barbiere di Siviglia, Thomas' Hamlet, and Tchaikovsky's Eugene Onegin. The center of his Verdi repertoire remains Posa in Don Carlo, Germont in La traviata, the title roles in Macbeth and Simon Boccanegra, and more recently also Amfortas in Wagner's Parsifal and Scarpia in Puccini's Tosca.

As a recitalist Hampson has won worldwide recognition for his programs in a wide range of styles, languages, and periods. He is especially known for his interpretations of the music of Gustav Mahler – and, with his "Song of America" project collaboration with the Library of Congress, has become known as the "ambassador" of American song, and was named a "living Legend" by the Librarian James Billington.

Hampson's diverse and expansive discography has earned him an Edison Award for Lifetime Achievement, four Edison Awards, four Echo prizes, numerous VEB Deutsche Schallplatten, Gramophone Awards, and Grand Prix du Disque, as well as six Grammy Award nominations, and one Grammy Award. Vienna Acoustics, an Austrian music company, named one of their speakers "The Hampson Edition."

Elisabeth Schwarzkopf once said of her student, "[Thomas Hampson is] the best singer in Europe right now."

== Early life and education ==
Born in Elkhart, Indiana, Hampson has two older sisters, with whom he sang in church as a child. He grew up in Spokane, Washington, where he enrolled at Eastern Washington State College (now Eastern Washington University) in Cheney, majoring in political science/government. Concurrently, Hampson earned a BFA in Voice Performance at Fort Wright College under the tutelage of Sister Marietta Coyle. During the summers of 1978 and 1979, he studied under Gwendolyn Koldowsky and Martial Singher at the Music Academy of the West, where he won the Lotte Lehmann Award. He then continued his studies at the University of Southern California Thornton School of Music, where he worked with vocal coach Jack Metz and the baritone Horst Günter, a lifelong mentor. In 1980, as a consequence of winning the San Francisco Opera audition, he competed in the Merola Opera Program, in which he met Elisabeth Schwarzkopf. In 1981, he was one of the winners in the Metropolitan Opera National Council Auditions national finals.

== Early career ==
An audition tour in Europe in the early 1980s brought him a contract with the Deutsche Oper am Rhein in Düsseldorf, as well as the opportunity to study with Dame Elisabeth Schwarzkopf, whom he had met at the Merola program. In his three years as a member of the Düsseldorf ensemble (1981–84), he honed his stage experience with a number of smaller roles, but also had bigger assignments, both in Düsseldorf and elsewhere. He sang the title role in Henze's Der Prinz von Homburg in Darmstadt, and Guglielmo, in a Jonathan Miller production of Mozart's Così fan tutte at the Opera Theatre of Saint Louis, which brought him significant attention in the United States.

In 1984, he began an engagement at the Opernhaus Zürich as a principal lyric baritone, among others participating in the legendary Harnoncourt-Ponnelle Mozart cycle, including all of the Da Ponte operas and the title role of the famed 1987 production of Don Giovanni. Engagements during this time also included those with companies in Hamburg, Cologne, and Vienna, and his 1984 London recital debut at Wigmore Hall.

His U.S. recital debut occurred April 14, 1986, at The Town Hall in New York, where The New York Times praised him for "good looks, a commanding stage presence and, even within the confines of the recital format, an apparently vivid theatricality...". Shortly after, he made his Metropolitan Opera debut on October 9, 1986, as the Count in Le nozze di Figaro. In 1986, he was invited to audition for Leonard Bernstein, which led to Hampson's participation in the 1987 semi-staged performance of Puccini's La bohème in Rome, led by Bernstein, and, soon after, their legendary performances with the Vienna Philharmonic of Gustav Mahler's Kindertotenlieder (1988), Rückert-Lieder (1990) and Lieder eines fahrenden Gesellen (1990). From this point forward, he was recognized as "among the leading lyric baritones of the late century."

== 1990s ==
The next years brought performances in many of the world's most important concert venues (including Avery Fisher Hall, Barbican Centre, Carnegie Hall, Concertgebouw, Royal Albert Hall, Théâtre du Châtelet), opera houses (including Lyric Opera of Chicago, Metropolitan Opera, Paris Opera, Royal Opera House Covent Garden, San Francisco Opera, Vienna State Opera) and festivals (Mostly Mozart Festival, Maggio Musicale, the Salzburg Festival), where Hampson performed with some of the world's most renowned pianists (incl. John Browning, Geoffrey Parsons, Wolfram Rieger, Craig Rutenberg, Wolfgang Sawallisch), orchestras (incl. Chicago Symphony Orchestra, Houston Symphony, New York Philharmonic, Philadelphia Orchestra, San Francisco Symphony, Orchestra dell'Accademia Nazionale di Santa Cecilia in Rome, Spokane Symphony, Staatskapelle Berlin, UBS Verbier Orchestra) and conductors (incl. Daniel Barenboim, Christoph Eschenbach, Daniele Gatti, Vladimir Jurowski, James Levine, Fabio Luisi, Kurt Masur, Zubin Mehta, Seiji Ozawa, Antonio Pappano, Michael Tilson Thomas, and Franz Welser-Möst).

In 1990, Hampson released his first solo recital album on Teldec titled Des Knaben Wunderhorn, in collaboration with Geoffrey Parsons. The piano used for the recording had belonged to Mahler himself. The New York Times praised the recording, saying that "the performances have a luminous beauty and cast a storyteller's spell." In February and March of the same year, Hampson continued his partnership with Bernstein, first in a widely appreciated performance of Mahler's Rückert-Lieder and Lieder eines fahrenden Gesellen, and then for his Carnegie Hall debut, performing Mahler's two cycles with the Vienna Philharmonic (Bernstein's last public performances in the venue). In November, he made his San Francisco Opera debut, performing the title role in Monteverdi's Il ritorno d'Ulisse in patria and role debut as Don Giovanni at the Metropolitan Opera.

In 1991, Hampson opened the New York Philharmonic season in a Live from Lincoln Center telecast, singing Aaron Copland's Old American Songs in a performance conducted by Kurt Masur. He also sang in the 25th Anniversary Gala of the Metropolitan Opera, which was recorded live for video/CDV. The same year, he released a Cole Porter tribute album on EMI/Angel.

In 1992, he was named the Musical America's Singer of the Year, alongside John Corigliano, Robert Shaw, Christoph von Dohnányi, and Yo-Yo Ma. The year included many notable performances, including: the Rossini 200th birthday gala at Avery Fisher Hall, the title role in Britten's Billy Budd at the Met, the Count in Le nozze di Figaro at Florence's Maggio Musicale conducted by Zubin Mehta, Brahms' Ein deutsches Requiem with Daniel Barenboim at the Chicago Symphony Orchestra, and two performances of Schumann's Dichterliebe: one in Geneva and the other in his first recital at Carnegie Hall.

Hampson began 1993 by performing his first rendition of the title character in Thomas' Hamlet in Monte Carlo. The performance was subsequently recorded for EMI/Angel. That year, he continued to add to his repertoire with performances including Il barbiere di Siviglia at The Royal Opera House, Covent Garden and the Met, his debut in the role of Posa in Verdi's Don Carlo in Zürich, the title role in Henze's Der Prinz von Homburg, and Chorebe in Les Troyens by Berlioz at the Metropolitan Opera. 1993 also saw the beginning of Hampson's institutional involvement in the classical world, when he gave a series of master classes at the Tanglewood Festival in Lenox, Massachusetts. He was also awarded an honorary doctorate of music in his hometown of Spokane, Washington from Whitworth College that same year, and took a large role in the publication of a new critical edition of Mahler songs, alongside which he released a recording in collaboration with Geoffrey Parsons.

In January 1994, Hampson made his debut with the Houston Symphony Orchestra, singing Mahler and Copland, and conducted by Christoph Eschenbach. Later that month he was named Male Singer of the Year by the International Classical Music Awards. He then embarked on a five-month tour that led him to over twenty cities, featuring recitals debuts in Reutlingen, State College, Washington, D.C., Iowa City, Fort Worth, Quebec, and Buffalo, New York. In July, he opened the Mostly Mozart Festival in a telecast Live from Lincoln Center, and then in August he performed at the Salzburg Festival with a solo recital of Barber and Mahler. In September, he sang the leading role in the world premiere of the Conrad Susa and Philip Littell's opera, The Dangerous Liaisons and then in October recorded the 20 Lieder und Gesänge based on his and Dr. Renate Hilmar-Voit's research.

External audio
- You may hear Thomas Hampson as Herod Antipas in Jules Massenet's opera Hérodiade with Cheryl Studer, Nadime Denize, Ben Heppner and Michel Plasson conducting the Orchestre national du Capitole de Toulouse in 1995 Here on archive.org

In 1995, Hampson received two awards for his contribution to classical music: the Cannes Classical Music Award for Singer of the Year in 1994, and the Echo Music Prize for Best Male Singer. That year, he went on to perform in a number of significant productions, including Das Lied von der Erde at Carnegie Hall under the baton of James Levine, a Live from Lincoln Center telecast with Kathleen Battle, a performance of Britten's War Requiem in Rome conducted by Wolfgang Sawallisch, a recital of all of Gustav Mahler's songs (Hampson's new critical edition) for the Mahler Festival at Concertgebouw, and another engagement with Sawallisch and the Philadelphia Orchestra at the Academy of Music.

Hampson began to develop his interest in American Song in 1996, first with his January performance at a Gala benefit for WNET and next with the I Hear America Singing: Great Performances project, shot in May. In February 1996, President Bill Clinton extended Hampson's first invitation to sing at the White House during a state dinner honoring French President Jacques Chirac. Additionally, he was inducted as an Honorary Member of the Royal Academy of Music in London in June. Other important appearances of Hampson's in 1996 include a series of master classes at the Mozarteum University of Salzburg, and two productions of Don Carlos in the original French (directed by Luc Bondy), one in Paris and one in London.

In April 1997, he made his first performance as Eugene Onegin in Tchaikovsky's opera of the same name at the Vienna State Opera, and in May he reunited with Harnoncourt for a rare production of Schubert's Alfonso und Estrella at Theater an der Wien in Vienna. Hampson also cemented his role as an American musical fixture, first by serving as Artistic Director, Creative Consultant, and Performer on the PBS production "Thomas Hampson: I Hear America Singing," and next by winning EMI's Artist of the Year Award. He also made his first appearance as Riccardo in Bellini's I puritani at the Metropolitan Opera, his performance being hailed as "the most serious bel canto effort" by the Metropolitan Opera Guild. In October he débuted yet another role: Antonio in Donizetti's rarely performed Linda di Chamounix at the Vienna State Opera.

Hampson began 1998 with the world premiere of Richard Danielpour's Elegies in Jacksonville, Florida and later reprised the role at Carnegie Hall. In February he teamed up with Jerry Hadley, Cheryl Studer, and Craig Rutenberg to perform I Hear America Singing at the Barbican Centre in London. Late in the year, Hampson found himself engaged at the Vienna State Opera once more, this time debuting the title role of Rossini's Guillaume Tell.

Early 1999 saw Hampson back at the Metropolitan Opera, this time in the title role in the baritone version of Massenet's Werther, alongside Susan Graham. In April he performed with soprano Renée Fleming at the White House for a gala. In July, he made yet another role debut: Wolfram in Wagner's Tannhäuser, a role that would later win him the 2002 Grammy Award for Best Opera Recording. In August he made another debut in Busoni's Doktor Faust.

== 2000s ==
In early 2000, Hampson returned to his fascination with Gustav Mahler, performing a Mahler-centric recital at Carnegie Hall in February. He also reprised his performance in Doktor Faust at the Met. That year, he served as a member of the Artistic Committee for the Kennedy Center Honors and sang at the Centennial Celebration for Elinor Remick Warren at the Washington National Cathedral. Appearing again with Renée Fleming, Hampson also put out a recording of Massenet's Thaïs late in the year.

In February 2001, he sang Amfortas in Wagner's Parsifal at the Paris Opera and the Royal Opera House in London, took a four-month recital tour across Europe and the U.S., performing with Vladimir Jurowski and Franz Welser-Möst.

2002 bore a number of role débuts, including an April performance as Mandryka in Arabella by Richard Strauss at the Théâtre du Châtelet in Paris alongside Karita Mattila, another as the title role in the world premiere of Friedrich Cerha's Der Riese vom Steinfeld in June, and then two performances in October: one as the title role in Verdi's Simon Boccanegra at the Vienna State Opera under the baton of Daniele Gatti and the direction of Peter Stein, and one in the world premiere of Wolfgang Rihm's Sechs Gedichte von Friedrich Nietzsche in Cologne. Finally, in December, he made his first stage appearance in the role of Athanael in Thaïs at the Lyric Opera of Chicago.

In 2003, Hampson performed in a recital dedicated to the works of composer Hugo Wolf, first in February at Carnegie Hall (appearing with pianist/conductor Daniel Barenboim) and then at the Salzburg Festival in a piece titled "The Hugo Wolf Project", created by Hampson and featuring a number of his famous contemporaries. That year, he also reprised his roles in Tannhäuser and Don Giovanni, and sang an arrangement of the poem Dover Beach with the Emerson String Quartet. Later that year, he also appeared with the Vienna Philharmonic in a performance of Friedrich Cerha's Baal-Gesänge under Zubin Mehta.

Hampson returned to the Metropolitan Opera in 2004 to sing the title role in Don Giovanni, directed by Marthe Keller. He reprised this role again on in the Japan tour of the Vienna State Opera under the baton of Seiji Ozawa. He also appeared in Tannhäuser once more, directed by Otto Schenk and conducted by Mark Elder. That year, he also began a collaboration with the Library of Congress that led to the creation of the Hampsong Foundation.

He debuted in Un ballo in maschera and another performance at the 2005 Salzburg Festival, this time as Germont in La traviata. That year, he also launched his website, www.thomashampson.com. Finally, Hampson's collaboration with the Library of Congress then led him on a 12-city concert tour that extended through summer 2006.

In 2006, in a collaboration between the Heidelberger Frühling Festival and the Hampsong Foundation, the 200th anniversary of the printing of Des Knaben Wunderhorn was celebrated in concerts, symposium, and master classes. That year was also the 50th anniversary of the Vienna State Opera's reopening, and Hampson was invited to sing at a gala in the venue's honor. Hampson also sang at the Salzburg Festival once more, this time in honor of Mozart's 250th Birthday. The year's performances included the title role in Verdi's Macbeth, the title role in Doktor Faust once more and Mandryka in a new production of Arabella.

In 2007, Hampson returned to Simon Boccanegra at the Met. In May, he performed with the San Francisco Symphony at Carnegie Hall, to great praise.

In 2008, Hampson appeared as Carlo in a revival of Verdi's Ernani at the Metropolitan Opera. He also took once more to the role of Athanael in Massenet's Thaïs, again opposite Renée Fleming and sang at the opening nights of both the Metropolitan Opera and Carnegie Hall. Both performances were broadcast worldwide. In June, Hampson seized control of his media output and established his own independent record label, Thomas Hampson Media (THM), re-releasing six albums through iTunes.

In 2009, as part of the Metropolitan Opera's 125th Anniversary celebration, Hampson sang the last scene of Parsifal with tenor Plácido Domingo. In February, he performed in the world premiere of Michael Daugherty's Letters From Lincoln with the Spokane Symphony and then as the title role in Eugene Onegin at the Met. In March, he made his role début as Scarpia in Puccini's Tosca at the Zürich Opera. In May, he held a recital at the Supreme Court of the United States. Starting in September of that year, Hampson became the New York Philharmonic's first Artist-in-Residence. In November, Hampson launched www.songofamerica.net, an interactive database that details the culture and history of American Song and re-embarked on his "Song of America" tour, holding 13 recitals between July 2009 and February 2010.

== 2010s ==
In addition to his performance schedule, much of Hampson's modern career has centered on music scholarship and education. As such, in March 2010 he spearheaded the first-ever live streaming classical music available on a mobile app: a master class on Mahler songs, hosted by the Manhattan School of Music's Distance Learning Program. That year, he performed in the composer John Adams's 19-minute musical monologue, The Wound-Dresser. He also appeared in a trouble-ridden production of La traviata that year, under the baton of Leonard Slatkin, who later removed himself from the production.

Also in 2010, Hampson was elected into the American Academy of Arts and Sciences.

In 2011, Hampson sang the role of Rick Rescorla in the world premiere of Christopher Theofanidis' Heart of a Soldier with the San Francisco Opera, based on a true story from 9/11. Hampson continued activities in the Mahler community, performing in over 50 concerts of Mahler's music in 2011 in honor of the centennial of Mahler's death. That year also saw the debut of the Song of America radio series, co-produced by the Hampsong Foundation and the WFMT Radio Network of Chicago. Hosted by Hampson, the series consists of 13 hour-long programs exploring the history of American culture through song; it has aired in more than 200 U.S. markets.

Hampson's 2012 engagements included role debuts as Iago in Verdi's Otello and the title role in Hindemith's Mathis der Maler, both at Zurich Opera, and his house debut as Verdi's Macbeth at the Metropolitan Opera. Among other season highlights include concerts with the National Symphony Orchestra and Christoph Eschenbach, the Munich Philharmonic and Zubin Mehta, the Los Angeles Philharmonic and Gustavo Dudamel, the Pittsburgh Symphony and Manfred Honeck and the Israel Philharmonic and Zubin Mehta. He was featured in CNN's "Fusion Journeys" series, which filmed him in South Africa in a musical exchange with Ladysmith Black Mambazo. In 2013, he recorded Verdi's Simon Boccanegra for Decca Classics, with costars Kristine Opolais and Joseph Calleja. That same year, he was inducted into the Gramophone Hall of Fame.

He received an Honorary Doctor of Music degree from New England Conservatory in 2015, the same year that he premiered a new work by Pulitzer Prize-winning composer Jennifer Higdon at Carnegie Hall. In 2016, Hampson added another role to his operatic repertoire with the world premiere of Miroslav Srnka's South Pole at the Bavarian State Opera. He starred as Roald Amundsen, opposite tenor Rolando Villazón as Robert Falcon Scott, in the real-life story of the Antarctic explorers' race to reach the South Pole. In 2017, he was awarded the Hugo-Wolf-Medaille alongside Wolfram Rieger, for their outstanding achievements in the art of song interpretation.

== 2020s ==
Hampson received the 2020 Heidelberger Frühling Music Award.

== Personal life ==
Hampson is married to Andrea Herberstein, and has three step-children with her. He has one daughter, Meghan, from his first marriage, which ended in divorce in 1986. His eldest stepdaughter, Catherine, was married to singer Luca Pisaroni, to whom she was introduced by her father. Having settled in Vienna long-term, Hampson later began dividing his time between New York City and Zürich.

== Teaching and scholarship ==
In addition to his performance schedule, much of Hampson's modern career has centered on music scholarship and education. In 2007, he was instated as a member of the board of the Manhattan School of Music where he is also part of the Artistic Advisory Board, positions which allow him to frequently teach master classes for the school's Distance Learning Program that are streamed live to Internet and smart phone users worldwide.

In March 2011, Hampson continued his dedication to song with the opening of the first Lied Academy as part of the Heidelberger Frühling Festival. Under the artistic direction of Hampson, and with the contribution of prominent visiting artists, such as Graham Johnson, Brigitte Fassbaender and Nikolaus Harnoncourt, the Academy each year transforms the German city into an international meeting point for the Lied.

== Repertory ==
=== Concert works ===
- John Adams, The Wound-Dresser
- Johannes Brahms, Ein Deutsches Requiem
- Benjamin Britten, War Requiem
- Aaron Copland, Old American Songs
- Michael Daugherty, Letters From Lincoln (World premiere)
- Gustav Mahler, Das Lied von der Erde, Des Knaben Wunderhorn, Lieder eines fahrenden Gesellen, Kindertotenlieder, and Rückert-Lieder

=== Operas / operettas ===
- Richard Nixon, Nixon in China (Adams)
- Riccardo, I puritani (Bellini)
- Wozzeck, Wozzeck (Berg)
- Chorèbe, Les Troyens (Berlioz)
- Billy, Billy Budd (Britten)
- Dr. Faust, Doktor Faust (Busoni)
- Der Riese, Der Riese vom Steinfeld (Cerha)*
- Conte Robinson, Il matrimonio segreto (Cimarosa)
- Le roi Arthus, Le roi Arthus (Chausson)
- Dark Fiddler, A Village Romeo and Juliet (Delius)
- Malatesta, Don Pasquale (Gaetano Donizetti)
- Belcore, L'elisir d'amore (Donizetti)
- Antonio, Linda di Chamounix (Donizetti)
- Oreste, Iphigénie en Tauride (Gluck)
- Valentin, Faust (Gounod)
- Cesare / Achille, Giulio Cesare (Handel)
- Prinz, Der Prinz von Homburg (Henze)
- Mathis, Mathis der Maler (Hindemith)
- Danilo, The Merry Widow (Lehár)
- Silvio, Pagliacci (Leoncavallo)
- Hérode, Hérodiade (Massenet)
- Lescaut, Manon (Massenet)
- Athanaël, Thaïs (Massenet)
- Werther / Albert, Werther (Massenet)
- Ulisse, Il ritorno d'Ulisse in patria (Monteverdi)
- Apollo, L'Orfeo (Monteverdi)
- Guglielmo / Don Alfonso, Così fan tutte (Mozart)
- M. Vogelsang, Der Schauspieldirektor (Mozart)
- Sprecher, The Magic Flute (Mozart)
- Don Giovanni, Don Giovanni (Mozart)
- Count Almaviva, The Marriage of Figaro (Mozart)
- Gendarme, Les mamelles de Tirésias (Poulenc)
- Marcello / Schaunard, La bohème (Puccini)
- Yamadori / Sharpless, Madama Butterfly (Puccini)
- Sergeant / Lescaut, Manon Lescaut (Puccini)
- Scarpia, Tosca (Puccini)
- Aeneas, Dido and Aeneas (Purcell)
- Tell, Guillaume Tell (Rossini)
- Figaro, The Barber of Seville (Rossini)
- Poeta, Prima la musica e poi le parole (Salieri)
- Der Auserwählte, Die Jakobsleiter (Schoenberg)
- Froila, Alfonso und Estrella (Schubert)
- Roland, Fierrabras (Schubert)
- Amundsen, South Pole (Miroslav Srnka)
- Falk, Die Fledermaus (J. Strauss II)
- Mandryka, Arabella (Strauss)
- Harlekin, Ariadne auf Naxos (Strauss)
- Vicomte de Valmont, The Dangerous Liaisons (Conrad Susa)*
- King Roger, King Roger (Szymanowski)
- Eugene Onegin, Eugene Onegin (Tchaikovsky)
- Rick Rescorla, Heart of a Soldier (Christopher Theofanidis)*
- Hamlet, Hamlet (Thomas)
- Lorenzo Da Ponte, The Phoenix (Tarik O'Regan)
- Amonasro, Aida (Verdi)
- Rodrigue, Don Carlo (Verdi)
- Don Carlo, Ernani (Verdi)
- Ford, Falstaff (Verdi)
- Il Conte di Luna, Il trovatore (Verdi)
- Francesco, I masnadieri (Verdi)
- Giorgio Germont, La traviata (Verdi)
- Macbeth, Macbeth (Verdi)
- Iago, Otello (Verdi)
- Simon Boccanegra, Simon Boccanegra (Verdi)
- Renato, Un ballo in maschera (Verdi)
- Gunther, Götterdämmerung (Wagner)
- King's herald, Lohengrin (Wagner)
- Wolfram, Tannhäuser (Wagner)
- Hadrian, Hadrian (Rufus Wainwright)

* indicates world premiere

=== Musicals ===
Role	Work	Composer
Frank Butler	Annie Get Your Gun	Irving Berlin
Gabey	On the Town	Leonard Bernstein
Robert Baker	Wonderful Town	Leonard Bernstein
Fred Graham	Kiss Me, Kate	Cole Porter

== Recordings ==
=== Select discography ===
- Mozart: Così fan tutte, conducted by James Levine, The Metropolitan Opera (1990)
- Porter: Kiss me, Kate, conducted by John McGlinn, EMI Digital, B000008HD3 (1990)
- Berlin: Annie Get Your Gun, conducted by John McGlinn, with Kim Criswell, Rebecca Luker, David Garrison, Jason Graae, EMI Classics, B000002RS4 (1991)
- An Old Song Re-Sung, EMI Digital, B000002RRM (1991)
- Griffes, Ives, MacDowell: Lieder, with pianist Armen Guzelimian, Warner Music Spain, B000009J2V (1991)
- Delius: Sea Drift, Florida Suite, Argo, B00000E4KQ (1991)
- Porter: Night and Day, Warner Classics (1991)
- Bernstein: Arias and Barcarolles, conducted by Michael Tilson Thomas, Deutsche Grammophon (1993)
- Bernstein: On the Town, conducted by Michael Tilson Thomas, Deutsche Grammophon (1993)
- Rossini: The Rossini Bicentennial Birthday Gala, conducted by Roger Norrington, EMI (1994)
- Verdi: Simon Boccanegra, Decca (2013)
- Britten: War Requiem: Warner Classics (2013)
- Richard Strauss: Notturno, Deutsche Grammophon, 00028947929437 (2014)
- Autograph: Thomas Hampson, Warner Classics (2015)
- Mozart: Le Nozze di Figaro, conducted by Yannick Nézet-Séguin, Deutsche Grammophon, 00028947959458 (2016)
- Richard Danielpour: Songs of Solitude & War Songs, conducted by Giancarlo Guerrero, Naxos, 8.559792 (2016)
- Christmas Surprises: Sony Music (2017)
- Tides of Life: Channel Classics, 0723385389170 (2017)
- Serenade. Thomas Hampson, Maciej Pikulski (piano); Pentatone PTC 5186681 (2017)
- Elgar: The Dream of Gerontius, conducted by Daniel Barenboim, Decca, 4831585 (2017)
- Songs from Chicago: Thomas Hampson, Kuang-Hao Huang (piano); Cedille CDR 90000 180 (2018)
- The Phoenix: Tarik O’Regan, John Caird, Thomas Hampson, Luca Pisaroni: Pentatone PTC 5186857 (2019)
- Hope: Daniel Hope, Zürcher Kammerorchester, Thomas Hampson, vocal ensemble Amarcord, Colin Rich, Deutsche Grammophon UPC 00028948605415 (2021)

=== Select videography ===
- Mahler: Kindertotenlieder (1988) with the Vienna Philharmonic conducted by Leonard Bernstein – Unitel Classica
- The Metropolitan Opera Gala 1991, Deutsche Grammophon DVD, 00440-073-4582
- James Levine's 25th Anniversary Metropolitan Opera Gala (1996), Deutsche Grammophon DVD, B0004602-09
- Verdi: Don Carlos (1997), Kultur Video, B00008DDRK
- Verdi: Macbeth (2001), Image Entertainment, B00006LPDZ
- Mahler: Des Knaben Wunderhorn (2002) – Voices of our time, Alliance, B0002J9TX8
- Wonderful Town (2005) – EuroArts, B0009SQC2S
- La Traviata (2006) – Arthaus, B000CCU8SK
- Wagner: Parsifal (2006) – Opus Arte, OA0915D
