= 1919 Limerick Senior Hurling Championship =

Annual hurling competition season

- Champions: Croom (2nd title)
- Runners-up: Fedamore

The 1919 Limerick Senior Hurling Championship was the 27th staging of the Limerick Senior Hurling Championship since its establishment by the Limerick County Board in 1887.

Claughaun were the defending champions.

Croom won the championship after a 1–01 to 1–00 defeat of Fedamore in the final. It was their second championship title overall and their first title since 1908.
