= 1933 Limerick Senior Hurling Championship =

Annual hurling competition season

- Champions: Ahane (2nd title); Timmy Ryan (captain)
- Runners-up: Croom

The 1933 Limerick Senior Hurling Championship was the 39th staging of the Limerick Senior Hurling Championship since its establishment by the Limerick County Board.

Young Irelands were the defending champions.

On 26 November 1933, Ahane won the championship after a 1–07 to 1–01 defeat of Croom in the final. It was their second championship title overall and their first title in two championship seasons.

== Results ==
=== Final ===
| 26 November 1933 Final | Ahane | 1–07 – 1–01 | Croom | Gaelic Grounds, Limerick |
