= 1907 Limerick Senior Hurling Championship =

Annual hurling competition season

- Champions: Caherline (3rd title)
- Runners-up: Ballyagran

The 1907 Limerick Senior Hurling Championship was the 16th staging of the Limerick Senior Hurling Championship since its establishment by the Limerick County Board in 1887.

Caherline were the defending champions.

Caherline won the championship after a 3–08 to 0–01 defeat of Ballyagran in the final. It was their third championship title overall and their second title in succession. It remains their last championship triumph.
