= 1934 Limerick Senior Hurling Championship =

Annual hurling competition season

- Champions: Ahane (3rd title); Timmy Ryan (captain)
- Runners-up: Kildimo

The 1934 Limerick Senior Hurling Championship was the 40th staging of the Limerick Senior Hurling Championship since its establishment by the Limerick County Board.

Ahane were the defending champions.

Ahane won the championship after a 6–06 to 3–03 defeat of Kildimo in the final. It was their third championship title overall and their second title in succession.

== Results ==
=== Final ===
Final	Ahane	6–06 – 3–03	Kildimo	Gaelic Grounds, Limerick
