= John Gilhooly =

Irish arts administrator

John Gilhooly, CBE, OSI (born 15 August 1973, Castleconnell, County Limerick, Ireland) is a British and Irish arts administrator. He is currently artistic and executive director of Wigmore Hall.

== Education ==
Gilhooly was educated at Lisnagry National School, Ardscoil Rís, Limerick. He read history and political science at University College Dublin, from which he graduated in 1994. He then studied singing as a tenor at the Dublin City College of Music and the Leinster School of Music, under the mentorship of Veronica Dunne.

== Career ==
Gilhooly had worked on events and concerts at Harrogate International Centre and at the ExCel Centre in London's Docklands. In 2000, he became executive director of Wigmore Hall, with responsibility for general administration separate from its then-Artistic Director, William Lyne.

In 2005, Gilhooly became artistic director of Wigmore Hall in addition to the post of executive director, at age 32 he was then the youngest head of a classical concert venue worldwide. He has also chaired the biennial Wigmore Hall/Independent Opera International Song Competition and the Wigmore Hall String Quartet Competition. In June 2020, under Gilhooly's leadership, Wigmore Hall was the first UK classical music venue to present a live series of streamed chamber music concerts under quarantine conditions in the wake of the COVID-19 pandemic.

Gilhooly became chairman of the Royal Philharmonic Society in 2010. Gilhooly is also a frequent juror in international competitions, and chaired the BBC Cardiff Singer of The World Song Competition in June 2019. He undertakes a variety of voluntary work in music and the arts and is associated with numerous arts charities. He has served as Chairman of Mahogany Opera Group and holds a number of Honorary Patronages, including Leeds Lieder, The Chopin Society, Irish Heritage and the CAVATINA Chamber Music Trust. He is Patron of the Ina Boyle Society.

He was also Patron of the refurbishment of Corpus Christi Roman Catholic Church, Covent Garden. He is a trustee of the International Musicians’ Seminar, Cornwall, a trustee of The Susan Chilcott Scholarship and an advisor to London Music Masters. He is Patron of Wimbledon Music Festival and a freeman of the Worshipful Company of Musicians. He has held advisory roles with Cheltenham Music Festival and the Dartington Trust. He is a former director of the British Association of Concert Halls.

== Awards and honours ==
Gilhooly was appointed Officer of the Order of the British Empire (OBE) in 2013 and Commander of the Order of the British Empire (CBE) in the 2022 New Year Honours for services to music.

He has also been awarded the Star of Italy, the German Order of Merit and the Austrian Cross of Honour, and is a Knight in the Order of the White Rose of Finland. He has been granted honorary fellowships of the Royal Academy of Music, the Guildhall School and the Royal Irish Academy of Music, and honorary membership of the Royal College of Music.

In April 2019, the Heidelberger Frühling festival awarded Gilhooly its Heidelberger Frühling Music Award.

In 2016, The Sunday Times listed Gilhooly as one of the 500 most influential people in Britain, specifically as "one of the most influential figures in British arts administration." He has also received the Cobbett Medal for services to Chamber Music from the Worshipful Company of Musicians. He has been listed in The Evening Standard's "London's most influential" list.

In 2021, the Association of British Orchestras (ABO) named Gilhooly its Concert Hall Manager of the Year.
