= 1937 Limerick Senior Hurling Championship =

Annual hurling competition season

- Champions: Ahane (6th title); Mick Mackey (captain)
- Runners-up: Croom

The 1937 Limerick Senior Hurling Championship was the 43rd staging of the Limerick Senior Hurling Championship since its establishment by the Limerick County Board.

Ahane were the defending champions.

On 31 October 1937, Ahane won the championship after a 9–05 to 1–02 defeat of Croom in the final. It was their sixth championship title overall and their fifth title in succession.

== Results ==
=== Final ===
31 October 1937 Final	Ahane	9–05 – 1–02	Croom	Gaelic Grounds, Limerick
