= 1925 Limerick Senior Hurling Championship =

Annual hurling competition season

- Champions: Newcastle West (2nd title)
- Runners-up: Bruff

The 1925 Limerick Senior Hurling Championship was the 31st staging of the Limerick Senior Hurling Championship since its establishment by the Limerick County Board in 1887.

Croom were the defending champions.

Newcastle West won the championship after a 3–02 to 1–02 defeat of Bruffs in the final. It was second championship title overall and their first title 1917. It remains their last championship triumph.
