= 1917 Limerick Senior Hurling Championship =

Annual hurling competition season

- Champions: Newcastle West (1st title)
- Runners-up: Young Irelands

The 1917 Limerick Senior Hurling Championship was the 25th staging of the Limerick Senior Hurling Championship since its establishment by the Limerick County Board in 1887.

Claughaun were the defending champions.

Newcastle West won the championship after a 3–04 to 3–01 defeat of Young Irelands in the final. It was their first ever championship title.
