= 1935 Limerick Senior Hurling Championship =

Annual hurling competition season

- Champions: Ahane (4th title); Timmy Ryan (captain)
- Runners-up: Kildimo

The 1935 Limerick Senior Hurling Championship was the 41st staging of the Limerick Senior Hurling Championship since its establishment by the Limerick County Board.

Ahane were the defending champions.

Ahane won the championship after a 6–08 to 2–03 defeat of Kildimo in the final. It was their fourth championship title overall and their third title in succession.

== Results ==
=== Final ===
Final	Ahane	6–08 – 2–03	Kildimo	Gaelic Grounds, Limerick
