= Vogler Quartet =

German string quartet

The Vogler Quartet is a German string quartet based in Berlin. It was founded in 1985 and has been playing together with an unchanged line-up since 1986.

== History ==
Together with the Petersen Quartet, also based in East Berlin, it was one of the most important young ensembles in the GDR at the time, after the musicians won the string quartet competition in Evian France in May 1986 with multiple prizes. The quartet received artistic impulses from, among others, the LaSalle Quartet, the Guarneri Quartet, Sándor Végh and György Kurtág.

The quartet now performs internationally in all major music centres and at important festivals. Since 1993, it has been organising its own series in the Konzerthaus Berlin. The musicians' extensive repertoire covers all epochs and styles. In addition to the complete recordings of all string quartets by Robert Schumann and Johannes Brahms, CD recordings with works by Beethoven, Debussy, Janáček have been released, Reger, Schostakowich and finally with the two string quartets by Karl Amadeus Hartmann and the two and a half hour piano quintet Hauptweg und Nebenwege by Michael Denhoff.

The Vogler Quartet is also involved in various music festivals and projects - such as the Kassel Music Festival and the Kassel Children's Music Days, which have been taking place for several years now. As a teaching ensemble, the Vogler Quartet is a regular guest at the International Chamber Music Campus of Jeunesses Musicales Deutschland at the Weikersheim Castle.

== Lineup ==
- Tim Vogler, 1. Violin
- Frank Reinecke, 2. Violin
- Stefan Fehlandt, Viola
- Stephan Forck, Violoncello
