= Mountshannon House =

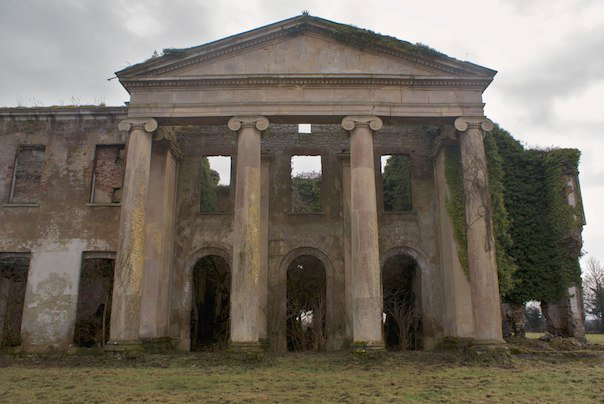

Mountshannon House was a large mansion in Lisnagry, near Castleconnell, County Limerick, built in the mid-18th century. It was the home of the 1st Earl of Clare, Lord Chancellor of Ireland 1789-1802. It was burnt down during the Anglo-Irish war in 1920. Today it is mostly a ruin.

== History ==
The house was built sometime in the mid-18th century, and was first occupied around 1750. It was subsequently purchased by John FitzGibbon (c. 1708-1780), whose descendants were later to become the Earls of Clare in the Peerage of Ireland. The estate covered 900 acres (3.6 km^{2}) of land, being bounded to the south by the Mulkear River, the Shannon to the west, and extending some 2 and a half miles along the main Limerick to Castleconnell road from Annacotty to Newgarden. Many parts of the boundary wall still exist today, on the modern Mountshannon road.

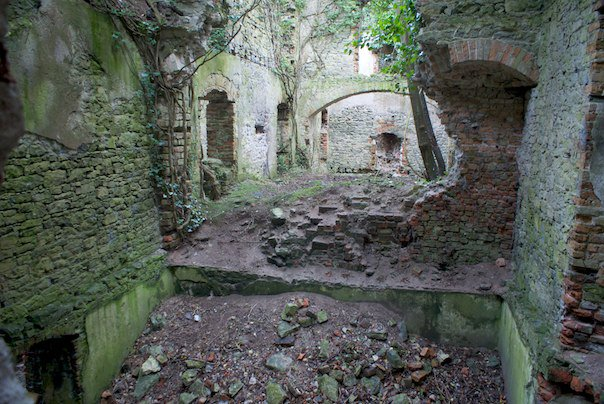
Modern interior of the house

John FitzGibbon (1748-1802), who was created the Earl of Clare (third known creation) in 1795, was appointed Attorney-General for Ireland in 1783, and was later promoted to being the Lord Chancellor of Ireland, in 1789 (in which capacity he was first promoted to the peerage, as the 1st Baron FitzGibbon, becoming the 1st Viscount FitzGibbon in 1793). He was a controversial figure in Irish history, being described variously as a Protestant hardliner, a staunch anti-Catholic, and an early supporter of Union with Great Britain (which finally happened shortly before his death). Lord Clare is said to have been an early opponent of measures for Catholic political relief (meaning the removal of some or all legal disabilities against Catholics) in both Ireland and Great Britain, and may have been the first to suggest to George III that the King would violate his coronation oath if he consented to the admission of Catholics to Parliament. He lived in this house for most of his life and career. Despite this hardline reputation, the FitzGibbon family was known locally to be fair landlords. This local reputation, however, did not prevent Lord Clare from being known as "Black Jack Fitzgibbon" nationally, apparently because of his hardline opposition to Catholic emancipation.

== Architecture ==
The house was built in neo-Palladian style. The front 7-bay entrance was adorned by four ionic columns, the rear had a large conservatory. Following its destruction in 1920, it has stood as a ruin, and has been partly demolished. However, the front columns still stand, as well as most of the main wings of the house.

Images of both the current ruins and the building before destruction can be found on Limerick City's library site:

Front of the house

Rear of the house, with the conservatory

Ruined façade

Interior photo of the Library
