= Mike Cummins =

Irish hurler (1878–1948)

Personal information
- Native name: Mícheál Ó Cuimin (Irish)
- Born: 6 September 1878 Ballymurn, County Wexford, Ireland
- Died: 24 December 1948 (aged 70) Ballymurn, County Wexford, Ireland
- Occupation: Farmer

Sport
- Sport: Hurling
Club
- Years: Club
- Ballymurn
Club titles
- Wexford titles: 2
Inter-county
- Years: County
- 1901-1918: Wexford
Inter-county titles
- Leinster titles: 3
- All-Irelands: 1

Michael Cummins (6 September 1878 – 24 December 1948) was an Irish hurler who played for the Wexford senior team.

Cummins joined the team during the 1901 championship, and was a regular member of the starting fifteen until his retirement after the 1918 championship. During that time, he won one All-Ireland and three Munster medals. An All-Ireland runner-up on one occasion, Cummins also won Tyler Cup and Croke Cup medals as a Gaelic footballer.

At club level Cummins was a two-time county club championship medallist with Ballymurn.
