= 1936 Limerick Senior Hurling Championship =

Annual hurling competition season

- Champions: Ahane (5th title); Mick Mackey (captain)
- Runners-up: Croom

The 1936 Limerick Senior Hurling Championship was the 42nd staging of the Limerick Senior Hurling Championship since its establishment by the Limerick County Board.

Ahane were the defending champions.

Ahane won the championship after a 7–08 to 0–03 defeat of Croom in the final. It was their fifth championship title overall and their fourth title in succession.

== Results ==
=== Final ===
Final	Ahane	7–08 – 0–03	Croom	Gaelic Grounds, Limerick
