= 1902 Limerick Senior Hurling Championship =

Annual hurling competition season

- Champions: Young Irelands (1st title); Jim Flanagan (captain)
- Runners-up: Monagea

The 1902 Limerick Senior Hurling Championship was the 13th staging of the Limerick Senior Hurling Championship since its establishment by the Limerick County Board in 1887.

Sallymount were the defending champions.

Young Irelands won the championship after a 2–09 to 0–05 defeat of Monagea in the final. It was their first ever championship title.
