= 1918 All-Ireland Senior Hurling Championship final =

1918 All-Ireland Senior Hurling Final
- Event: 1918 All-Ireland Senior Hurling Championship
Limerick	Wexford
9-5	1-3
- Date: 26 January 1919
- Venue: Croke Park, Dublin

The 1918 All-Ireland Senior Hurling Championship Final was the thirty-first All-Ireland Final and the culmination of the 1918 All-Ireland Senior Hurling Championship, an inter-county hurling tournament for the top teams in Ireland. Limerick were the winners.
