= Ciarán Barry =

Irish hurler

Personal information
- Native name: Ciarán de Barra (Irish)
- Born: 1999 (age 26–27) Castleconnell, County Limerick, Ireland
- Occupation: Student

Sport
- Sport: Hurling
- Position: Full-back
Club
- Years: Club
- Ahane
Club titles
- Limerick titles: 0
College(s)
- Years: College
- 2017-2021 2021-2022: University of Limerick; University College Cork
College titles
- Fitzgibbon titles: 0
Inter-county
- Years: County
- 2022-: Limerick
Inter-county titles
- Munster titles: 0
- All-Irelands: 0
- NHL: 0
- All Stars: 0

Ciarán Barry (born 1999) is an Irish hurler who plays for Limerick Senior Championship club Ahane and at inter-county level with the Limerick senior hurling team. He usually lines out as a defender.

== Career ==
Barry played hurling at juvenile and underage levels with the Ahane club before progressing onto the club's senior team. He simultaneously lined out with the University of Limerick and University College Cork in the Fitzgibbon Cup. Barry first appeared on the inter-county scene during a two-year stint with the Limerick minor hurling team before later lining out with the under-21 team. He joined the Limerick senior hurling team during the 2022 National Hurling League.

== Career statistics ==
As of 26 February 2023

Team	Year	National League			Munster		All-Ireland		Total	
Team	Year	Division	Apps	Score	Apps	Score	Apps	Score	Apps	Score
Limerick	2022	Division 1A	0	0-00	0	0-00	0	0-00	0	0-00
	2023	Division 1A	3	0-01	0	0-00	0	0-00	3	0-01
Career total			3	0-01	0	0-00	0	0-00	3	0-01

== Honours ==
Limerick

- Munster Hurling Cup: 2022
