= Miroslav Srnka =

Czech composer (born 1975)

Miroslav Srnka (born 23 March 1975 in Prague) is a Czech composer.

== Early life ==
Srnka studied musicology at Charles University Prague from 1993 to 1999 and composition with Milan Slavický at the Academy of Performing Arts in Prague from 1998 to 2003. He continued his studies from 1995 to 1996 at Humboldt University of Berlin and in 2001 at the Conservatoire de Paris. He took composition master classes with Ivan Fedele in 2002 and Philippe Manoury in 2004, as well as a course at IRCAM in 2001. He was the composer in residence of the Theater & Orchester Heidelberg.

== Career ==
His pieces were performed by Ensemble InterContemporain, Klangforum Wien, Ensemble Modern, Bavarian Radio Symphony Orchestra, BBC Philharmonic, Prague Philharmonia and others, at festivals including Prague Spring, Ultraschall Berlin, Milano Musica, Printemps des Arts de Monte-Carlo and Wittener Tage für neue Kammermusik.

His chamber opera Make No Noise premiered in June 2011 at the Munich Opera Festival, followed by a new production at the Bregenzer Festspiele in August 2016. In Dezember 2011, the Young Scene of the Semperoper in Dresden premiered his children's ‘comic book opera’ Jakub Flügelbunt, commissioned by the opera house. In 2014, this opera was added to the regular repertoire.

The opera South Pole, written by Srnka as a commission of Bavarian State Opera on a libretto by Tom Holloway, premiered there on 31 January 2016, with Rolando Villazón as Scott, Thomas Hampson as Amundsen, conducted by Kirill Petrenko, staged by Hans Neuenfels. The opera was nominated for the International Opera Awards in 2017.

In 2017, Srnka was the featured composer of the Salzburg Dialogue Festival.

On 13 November 2018 his work Overheating premiered at the Los Angeles Philharmonic. The Los Angeles Times reported:

"Overheating" is as exactly as uncomfortable as it needs to be, with its gusts of roiling and airless sounds. A muted trumpet wha-whas into the night. A solo cello slides down the scale like a first responder down the station pole. Still, a sense of emerging, of sparks of sound becoming fertile offers if not hope, awareness.

— Mark Swed, L.A. Phil's Green Umbrella takes on the European avant-garde, Los Angeles Times

== Recognition ==
- Gideon Klein Award (2001)
- Leoš Janáček Anniversary Prize (2004)
- Ernst von Siemens Composer Prize (2009)
- Scholarship of the Wilfried-Steinbrenner-Stiftung (2009)

== Works ==
=== Stage ===
- South Pole, a double opera in two parts (2015), Libretto: Tom Holloway
- Jakub Flügelbunt ...und Magdalena Rotenband oder: Wie tief ein Vogel singen kann, a comic book for three singers and orchestra (2011)
- Make No Noise, chamber opera (2011), Libretto: Tom Holloway
- Wall, short chamber opera (2005), Text by Jonathan Safran Foer

=== Orchestra ===
- move 03, for large orchestra (2016)
- move 01 / move 02, for large orchestra (2015)
- No Night No Land No Sky, for chamber orchestra (2014)
- Piano Concerto (2012)
- Eighteen Agents, for 19 strings (2012)
- Reading Lessons, for orchestra (2007)

=== Ensemble ===
- Speed of Truth, for choir, clarinet and ensemble (2019)
- Overheating, for ensemble (2018)
- My Life Without Me, for soprano and ensemble (2008/2013), Texts by Isabel Coixet
- Assembly, for ensemble (2011)
- Fan Faire, for brass instruments and percussion (2009)
- Reservoirs, for ensemble (2007)
- Fictitious Hum, for oboe, clarinet, piano and string quartet (2007)
- Magnitudo 9.0, for flute, clarinet, violin, cello and percussion (2005)
- Les Adieux, for ensemble (2004/2007)

=== Chamber music ===
- Emojis, Likes and Ringtones, for piano trio (2018)
- Future Family, for string quartet (2017)
- docudrama01 - Orph & Eury, for wind trio (2014)
- track 01, for violin and piano (2014)
- Here With You, for violin and cello (2011, rev. 2016)
- Engrams, for string quartet (2011)
- Escape Routines, for clarinet, violin, viola, cello and harp (2010)
- Tree of Heaven, for violin, viola and cello (2010)
- Pouhou vlnou / Qu'une vague, for piano quintet (2008)
- Dreizehn Lieder, for middle voice and piano on texts from picture postcards by Jurek Becker to his son Jonathan (2007)
- Prostý prostor / Simple Space, for solo cello and one harmonic instrument (2006)
- Moldau Remixed, for oboe, viola and harp (2005)
- Emily's Bees, for soprano, clarinet and piano (2004)
- String Quartet (Nr. 3) (2004)

=== Solo ===
- Triggering, for harpsichord (2018)
- Origami, for accordion (2015)
- track 02, for piano (2014)
- A Variation, for cello (2010)
- Coronae, for French horn (2010)
- ta větší, one variation on the final scene of Jenůfa for piano (2006)
- that long town of White to cross, for violin solo (2004)
- Ranní hajahu / The Morning Hajahu, for nine percussion instruments (1999)

=== Others ===
- Listening Eyes, an installation by Kateřina Vincourová with sound by Miroslav Srnka (2012)
- Když mne stará matka, Struna naladěna, instrumentation of songs by Antonín Dvořák, for soprano, piano and orchestra (2006)
- Rodíme! / We Are Giving Birth!, sound art (2003)
