= 1908 Limerick Senior Hurling Championship =

Annual hurling competition season

- Champions: Croom (1st title)
- Runners-up: Caherline

The 1908 Limerick Senior Hurling Championship was the 17th staging of the Limerick Senior Hurling Championship since its establishment by the Limerick County Board in 1887.

Caherline were the defending champions.

Croom won the championship after a 2–06 to 0–04 defeat of Caherline in the final. It was their first ever championship title.
