= 1939 Limerick Senior Hurling Championship =

Annual hurling competition season

- Champions: Ahane (8th title); Mick Mackey (captain)
- Runners-up: Croom

The 1939 Limerick Senior Hurling Championship was the 45th staging of the Limerick Senior Hurling Championship since its establishment by the Limerick County Board.

Ahane were the defending champions.

Ahane won the championship after a 5–08 to 2–04 defeat of Croom in the final. It was their eighth championship title overall and their seventh title in succession.

== Results ==
=== Final ===
28 April 1940 Final	Ahane	5–08 – 2–04	Croom	Gaelic Grounds
