= Tyler Mackey =

Irish hurler and politician

John "Tyler" Mackey
Personal information
- Native name: Seán Mac Aodha (Irish)
- Born: 23 August 1882 Castleconnell, County Limerick
- Died: 2 December 1962 (aged 80) Castleconnell, County Limerick
- Occupation: Farmer

Sport
- Sport: Hurling
- Position: Midfield
Club
- Years: Club
- Castleconnell
Club titles
- Limerick titles: 1
Inter-county
- Years: County
- 1901-1917: Limerick
Inter-county titles
- Munster titles: 2
- All-Irelands: 0

John "Tyler" Mackey (23 August 1882 – 2 December 1962) was an Irish hurler and Labour Party politician. Mackey played as a midfielder for the Limerick senior team. He also represented the Labour party on Limerick County Council, having been elected in the Castleconnell electoral area.

Mackey made his first appearance for the team during the 1901 championship and was a regular member of the starting fifteen until his retirement after the 1917 championship. During that time he won two Munster medals, however, an All-Ireland medal eluded him.

At club level Mackey was a one-time county championship medalist with Castleconnell.

Mackey's two sons, Mick and John, Jnr., won several All-Ireland medals throughout the 1930s and 1940s.

Sporting positions
Preceded by	Limerick Senior Hurling Captain; 1910-1911	Succeeded by
