= 1915 Limerick Senior Hurling Championship =

Annual hurling competition season

- Champions: Claughaun (2nd title); Dinny Maher (captain)
- Runners-up: Fedamore

The 1915 Limerick Senior Hurling Championship was the 23rd staging of the Limerick Senior Hurling Championship since its establishment by the Limerick County Board in 1887.

Claughaun were the defending champions.

Claughaun won the championship after being granted a walkover by Fedamore in the final. It was their second championship title overall and their second championship title in succession.

== Results ==
=== Final ===
| Final | Claughaun | w/o – scr. | Fedamore |
