= Dinny Lanigan =

Limerick hurler

Personal information
- Native name: Donncha Ó Lonagáin (Irish)
- Born: 24 July 1891 Gortnahoe, County Tipperary, Ireland
- Died: 18 September 1966 (aged 75) Ennis Road, Limerick, Ireland
- Occupation: Building contractor

Sport
- Sport: Hurling
- Position: Left wing-back
Clubs
- Years: Club
- Granagh; Young Irelands
Club titles
- Limerick titles: 5
Inter-county
- Years: County
- 1916–1926: Limerick
Inter-county titles
- Munster titles: 3
- All-Irelands: 2

Denis Lanigan (24 July 1891 – 18 September 1966) was an Irish hurler who played as a left wing-back at senior level for the Limerick county team.

Born in Gortnahoe, County Tipperary, Lanigan first arrived on the inter-county scene at the age of twenty-two when he first linked up with the Limerick senior team. He made his senior debut in the 1916 Thomond Feis. Lanigan went on to play a key part for Limerick during a golden age for the team, and won two All-Ireland medals and three Munster medals. He was an All-Ireland runner-up on one occasion.

At club level Lanigan won five championship medals with Young Irelands.

His retirement came following the conclusion of the 1926 championship.

In retirement from playing, Lanigan became involved in the administrative affairs of the Gaelic Athletic Association. He served as secretary of the Limerick County Board as well as vice-president of the Munster Council. Lanigan also served as an inter-county referee.

== Honours ==
Young Irelands

- Limerick Senior Hurling Championship (5): 1920, 1922, 1928, 1930, 1932

Limerick

- All-Ireland Senior Hurling Championship (2): 1918, 1921
- Munster Senior Hurling Championship (3): 1918, 1921, 1923

Achievements
Preceded by Pat McCullagh	All-Ireland SHC Final referee 1927	Succeeded by John Roberts
