= 1900 Limerick Senior Hurling Championship =

Annual hurling competition season

- Champions: Sallymount (1st title)
- Runners-up: Rathkeale

The 1900 Limerick Senior Hurling Championship was the 12th staging of the Limerick Senior Hurling Championship since its establishment by the Limerick County Board in 1887.

Kilfinane were the defending champions.

Sallymount won the championship after a 7–01 to 2–04 defeat of Rathkeale in the final. It remains their only championship title.
