= 1914 Limerick Senior Hurling Championship =

Annual hurling competition season

- Champions: Claughaun (1st title); Paddy Ryan (captain)
- Runners-up: Castleconnell

The 1914 Limerick Senior Hurling Championship was the 22nd staging of the Limerick Senior Hurling Championship since its establishment by the Limerick County Board in 1887.

Fedamore were the defending champions.

Claughaun won the championship after a 6–00 to 0–00 defeat of Castleconnell in the final. It was their first ever championship title.

== Results ==
=== Final ===
Final	Claughaun	6–00 – 0–00	Castleconnell
