= 1932 Limerick Senior Hurling Championship =

Annual hurling competition season

- Champions: Young Irelands (7th title); Micky Fitzgibbon (captain)
- Runners-up: Newcastle West

The 1932 Limerick Senior Hurling Championship was the 38th staging of the Limerick Senior Hurling Championship since its establishment by the Limerick County Board in 1887.

Ahane were the defending champions.

Young Irelands won the championship after a 2–06 to 1–03 defeat of Newcastle West in the final. It was their seventh championship title overall and their first title in two years. It remains their last championship triumph.

== Championship statistics ==
=== Miscellaneous ===
- Young Irelands win their 7th and final title.
