= 1922 Limerick Senior Hurling Championship =

Annual hurling competition season

- Champions: Young Irelands (4th title); Bob McConkey (captain)
- Runners-up: Bruff

The 1922 Limerick Senior Hurling Championship was the 29th staging of the Limerick Senior Hurling Championship since its establishment by the Limerick County Board in 1887.

Young Irelands were the defending champions.

Young Irelands won the championship after a 10–06 to 2–02 defeat of Bruff in the final. It was their fourth championship title overall and their second championship title in succession.

== Results ==
=== Final ===
Final	Young Irelands	10–06 – 2–02	Bruff
