= 1916 Limerick Senior Hurling Championship =

Annual hurling competition season

- Champions: Claughaun (3rd title); Dinny Maher (captain)
- Runners-up: Caherline

The 1916 Limerick Senior Hurling Championship was the 24th staging of the Limerick Senior Hurling Championship since its establishment by the Limerick County Board in 1887.

Claughaun were the defending champions.

Claughaun won the championship after an 8–03 to 3–01 defeat of Caherline in the final. It was their third championship title overall and their third championship title in succession.

== Results ==
=== Final ===
Final	Claughaun	8–03 – 3–01	Caherline
