= 1918 Limerick Senior Hurling Championship =

Annual hurling competition season

- Champions: Claughaun (4th title); Dinny Maher (captain)
- Runners-up: Newcastle West

The 1918 Limerick Senior Hurling Championship was the 26th staging of the Limerick Senior Hurling Championship since its establishment by the Limerick County Board in 1887.

Newcastle West were the defending champions.

Claughaun won the championship after being granted a walkover by Newcastle West in the final. It was their fourth championship title overall and their first championship title in two years.

== Results ==
=== Final ===
Final	Claughaun	w/o – scr.	Newcastle West
