= Petersen Quartet =

German string quartet

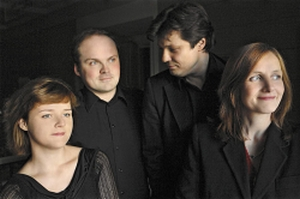
The Petersen Quartet (left to right, Ula Ulijona, Henry-David Varema, Conrad Muck, Ulrike Petersen)

The Petersen Quartet named after its founder Ulrike Petersen, is a German string quartet. It was founded in 1979 at the Hanns Eisler Music Conservatory in East Berlin and is regarded as one of the internationally renowned German chamber music ensembles of the late GDR period and the years following German reunification. After a hiatus of several years, the ensemble has been active again since the mid-2020s.

== History ==
The ensemble was founded in 1979 at the Hanns Eisler School of Music in what was then East Berlin. Its mentors included the Amadeus Quartet, Sandor Vegh, Rudolf Koeckert, and Thomas Brandis, among others. In 1992, Ulrike Petersen left the quartet. From that point on, Conrad Muck led the ensemble as first violinist (Primarius), from 2008 alternating with Ulrike Petersen, who rejoined the quartet until 2009.

== Artistic Activity ==
The ensemble's repertoire encompassed works from the Viennese Classical period and Romanticism as well as compositions of the 20th century up to contemporary music. The quartet performed in numerous European and international concert halls and at festivals.

The Petersen Quartet released numerous, repeatedly award-winning CD recordings featuring works by composers Aribert Reimann, Siegfried Matthus, Boris Blacher, Erwin Schulhoff, and Ernst Krenek. These recordings received, among other honors, the German Record Critics' Award (Preis der Deutschen Schallplattenkritik), the Echo Award, and the German Record Prize (Deutscher Schallplattenpreis).

The ensemble gained particular international recognition through its recordings of Beethoven's late string quartets. For its interpretations of the string quartets op. 18 no. 1 and op. 131, the quartet received several awards in 1995, including the Grand Prix of the Académie Charles Cros, Gramophone's Editor's Choice, and the Choc Award from Le Monde de la musique.

The quartet collaborated with numerous artists, including Stephen Kovacevich, Christine Schäfer, Juliane Banse, Christiane Oelze, Shlomo Mintz, Renaud Capuçon, Boris Pergamenschikow, and David Geringas.

In its current lineup, the musicians are devoted to completing the complete recording of Beethoven's string quartets for the Capriccio label, a project that once shaped the quartet's international profile and is scheduled for release in autumn 2026. With this complete edition, the ensemble draws a programmatic connection to the 200th anniversary of Beethoven's death in 2027.

== Members ==
- Violin I: Ulrike Petersen (1979–1992, 2008–2009), Conrad Muck (1992–2009 & from 2026)
- Violin II: Gernot Süßmuth (1979–2000), Daniel Bell (2000–2008 & from 2026), Conrad Muck (2008–2009)
- Viola: Friedemann Weigle (1979–2008, † 2015), Ula Ulijona (2008–2009), Sara Kim (from 2026)
- Cello: Hans-Jakob Eschenburg (1979–2000), Pavel Jonas Krejci (2000–2003), Henry-David Varema (2003–2009, from 2026)

=== Awards (selection) ===
- 2008: German Record Critics' Award for the CD featuring String Quartets Nos. 3 and 5 by Ernst Krenek, performed by Muck, Bell, Weigle, and Varema
- 2007: Echo "Classical" Award and German Record Critics' Award for "…oder soll es Tod bedeuten?" with Christine Schäfer: songs, fragments, string quartets, and intermezzi by Aribert Reimann, Felix Mendelssohn Bartholdy, and Robert Schumann
- 2003: German Record Critics' Award for the CD featuring String Quartets Nos. 1 and 7 by Ernst Krenek
- 2002: Echo Award for a recording with Juliane Banse and Wolfram Rieger featuring works by Guillaume Lekeu and Ernest Chausson
- 1999: Echo Award in the category "Best Chamber Music Recording of the 20th Century" (for Death and the Maiden string quartets by Franz Schubert and Das Mädchen und der Tod by Siegfried Matthus)
- 1995: Grand Prix Académie Charles Cros, Gramophone Editor's Choice, and Choc Award 1995 from Le Monde de la Musique for Beethoven's String Quartets op. 18 no. 1 and op. 131
- 1995: German Record Prize for recordings of works by Erwin Schulhoff
- 1993: German Record Prize for recordings of works by Erwin Schulhoff
- 1987: Second Prize at the ARD International Music Competition in Munich
- 1986: First Prize at the International Chamber Music Competition in Florence
- 1985: Second Prize at the String Quartet Competition in Evian, France
- 1984: Third Prize at the Prague Spring International Music Competition
