= Castleconnell =

Town in County Limerick, Ireland

Castleconnell Caisleán Uí Chonaill
- Town
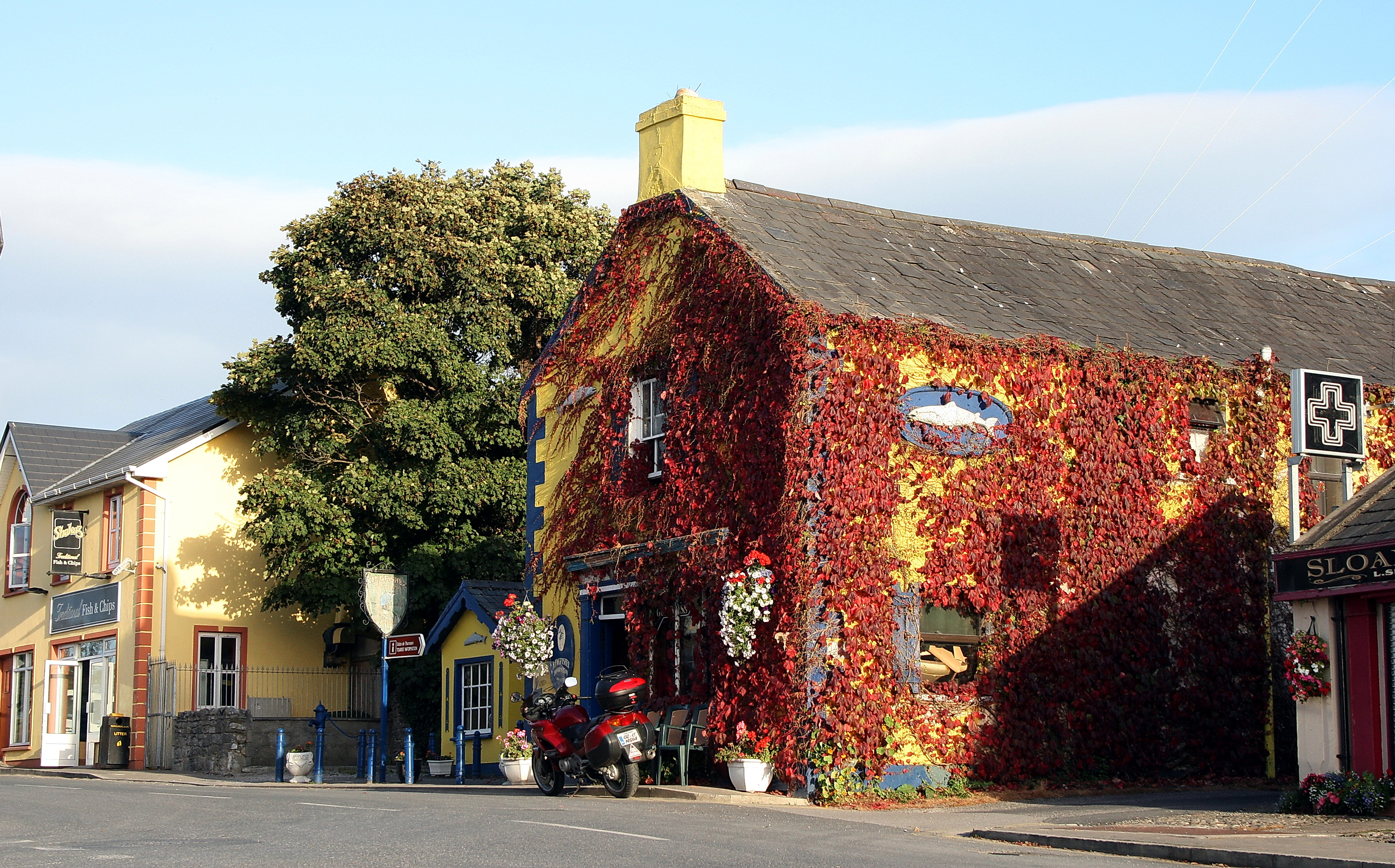
- Junction of Main Street and Station Road in Castleconnell

- Location in Ireland
- Coordinates: 52°42′51″N 8°30′06″W
- Country: Ireland
- Province: Munster
- County: County Limerick

Population (2016)
  - Total: 2,107
- Irish Grid Reference: R660627

Castleconnell (Irish: Caisleán Uí Chonaill, historically Caisleán Uí Chonaing) is a town in County Limerick, Ireland . It is on the banks of the River Shannon, near the boundaries of County Clare and County Tipperary, 10 km (6 mi) north-east of Limerick city centre,

== History ==
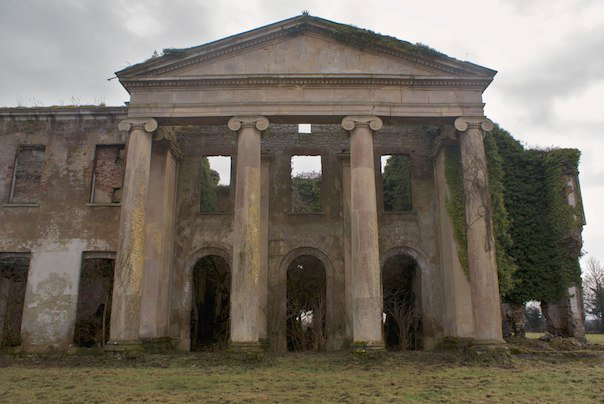
Facade of Mountshannon House

The ruins of the Castle of Connell (Irish: Caisleán Uí Chonaill or originally Caisleán Uí Chonaing), from which the name of the town derives, was built on a rock outcrop overlooking the bend of the river. It was destroyed in a siege by the army of General Ginkel, fighting in support of the Williamite Army of William of Orange at the end of the 17th century. A large chunk of the castle wall now lies approximately fifty feet from the castle, thrown clear by siege cannons. A footbridge over the Shannon – built during The Emergency (1939–45) by the Irish Army under Captain Carley Owens – connects counties Limerick and Clare.

The nearby Mountshannon House was the home of John FitzGibbon, 1st Earl of Clare, who in the late 18th century was the Attorney-General for Ireland and subsequently Lord Chancellor of Ireland. FitzGibbon was opposed to relaxation of the penal laws and helped usher in the Acts of Union 1800, which resulted in the Irish parliament's abolition. The house where his descendants lived was burnt to the ground by the IRA in the 1920s.

A number of 18th- and 19th-century buildings overlook the Shannon in Castleconnell. One of these, the former schoolhouse (built in 1867), was previously home to the Irish Harp Centre. Another, the former convent (built c. 1790), is now the Castleoaks House Hotel.

== Fishing ==
Castleconnell is known for its coarse and game fishing, and it has been a fishing destination since at least the 19th century. The main catch is salmon and trout. The Kingfisher Lodge, a local pub, has hosted fishing clientele over the years.

The Shannon Electricity Scheme and its Ardnacrusha dam at Parteen impacted Castleconnell in the 1930s when it reduced the flow of water south of the dam to approximately one sixth, dropping water levels along the Shannon.

The engineers added a fish lift to the dam, allowing fish to be lifted in a water-filled container and thereby pass upstream to their traditional spawning beds. The river at Castleconnell is also known for its bird life, and particularly its swans, many of which are migratory Icelandic whooper swans wintering and breeding on the river.

== Sport ==
=== Gaelic games ===
Castleconnell is the home of Ahane GAA club, which has won 19 Limerick Senior Hurling Championships between 1931 and 1948 and provided many of the Limerick hurling team that won All-Ireland Senior Hurling Championships in 1934, 1936 and 1940. Among its most notable players were Mick Mackey and Jackie Power.

=== Boxing ===
Boxer Andy Lee was raised in Castleconnell from the age of 14. He became World WBO Middleweight champion in 2014.

=== Rowing ===
Castleconnell boat club has been in existence since 1983. It is located at World's End (also known as Worral's End). Rowers have a smooth, wide water to row on for 3.2 kilometres (2.0 mi) to O'Brien's Bridge. Just beyond the bridge, rowers have another 1.5 kilometers before they come to a water flow regulator.

== Transport ==
Castleconnell railway station opened on 8 August 1858. The station lies on the Limerick–Ballybrophy railway line.

== Administration ==
Castleconnell was previously under the jurisdiction of Limerick County Council. Since 2014, it is part of the amalgamated local authority of Limerick City and County Council, where it is in the local electoral area of Limerick City East, which is part of the Metropolitan District of Limerick City. It is classified as a town under the Limerick Development Plan adopted by Limerick City and County Council in 2022.

== Notable residents ==
- Ciarán Barry (b. 1999), hurler
- John Gilhooly (b. 1973), arts administrator
- Bulmer Hobson (1883–1969), Irish republican who died in Castleconnell.
- Andy Lee (b. 1984), boxer who was born in England but raised in Castleconnell.
- Mick Mackey (1912–1983), hurler
- Dan Morrissey (b. 1993), hurler
- Tom Morrissey (b. 1996), hurler
- Pat Shortt (b. 1967), comedian and actor, who had a house in the area.

== See also ==
- List of towns and villages in Ireland
