= 1923 All-Ireland Senior Hurling Championship =

Championship details
- Dates: 20 May 1923 – 14 September 1924
- Teams: 16

All-Ireland champions
- Winning team: Galway (1st win)
- Captain: Mick Kenny

All-Ireland Finalists
- Losing team: Limerick
- Captain: Paddy McInerney

Provincial champions
- Munster: Limerick
- Leinster: Kilkenny
- Ulster: Donegal
- Connacht: Not Played

Championship statistics
- No. matches played: 15
- Goals total: 124 (8.2 per game)
- Points total: 68 (4.5 per game)
- All-Star Team: See here

The 1923 All-Ireland Senior Hurling Championship was the 37th staging of the All-Ireland Senior Hurling Championship, the Gaelic Athletic Association's premier inter-county hurling tournament. The championship began on 20 May 1923 and ended on 14 September 1924.

The championship was won by Galway who secured the title following a 7–3 to 4–5 defeat of Limerick in the All-Ireland final. This was their first All-Ireland title.

Kilkenny were the defending champions but were defeated by Galway in the All-Ireland semi-final.

== Results ==
=== Leinster Senior Hurling Championship ===
29 April 1923 Quarter-final	Offaly	3–1 – 6–3	Laois	O'Connor Park

20 May 1923 Semi-final	Kilkenny	4–2 – 3–3	Laois	Croke Park
				Referee: R O'Keeffe

22 July 1923 Final	Dublin	1–1 – 4–1	Kilkenny	Croke Park
				Referee: R O'Keeffe

=== Munster Senior Hurling Championship ===
24 June 1923 Quarter-final	Waterford	0–1 – 13–4	Cork	Fraher Field

15 July 1923 Quarter-final	Kerry	2–3 – 8–5	Limerick	Tralee Sportsfield

23 September 1923 Semi-final	Tipperary	11–2 – 4–1	Clare	Thurles Sportsfield

7 October 1923 Semi-final	Limerick	4–0 – 2–1	Cork	Thurles Sportsfield

16 March 1924 Final	Limerick	2–3 – 1–0	Tipperary	Cork Athletic Grounds

=== Ulster Senior Hurling Championship ===
19 August 1923 Quarter-final	Monaghan	3–3 – 3–0	Cavan	St. Tiernach's Park

30 September 1923 Semi-final	Monaghan	2–3 – 5–4	Antrim	St. Tiernach's Park

14 October 1923 Semi-final	Donegal	6–4 – 1–3	Derry	Lifford

6 April 1924 Final	Donegal	7–1 – 3–0	Antrim	St. Tiernach's Park

=== All-Ireland Senior Hurling Championship ===
Semi-finals

27 April 1924 Semi-final	Limerick	7–04 – 0–01	Donegal	Croke Park, Dublin
				Referee: P Kennefick (Cork)

18 May 1924 Semi-final	Galway	5–04 – 2–00	Kilkenny	Croke Park, Dublin
	L McGrath 3–1, I Harney 1–2, A Kelly 1–0, B Gibbs 0–1.		M Power 1–0, J Roberts 1–0.	Referee: A C Harty (Dublin)

Final

14 September 1924 Final	Galway	7–03 – 4–05	Limerick	Croke Park, Dublin
				Attendance: 7,000; Referee: P Kennefick (Dublin)

== Championship statistics ==
=== Miscellaneous ===
- Donegal win the Ulster championship for the first time since 1906.
- The All-Ireland semi-final between Limerick and Donegal marked the first time that players wore numbers on the backs of their jerseys. It is also the first and to date the only championship meeting between the two teams.
- Galway win the All-Ireland title for the first time in the history of the championship.

== Sources ==
- Corry, Eoghan, The GAA Book of Lists (Hodder Headline Ireland, 2005).
- Donegan, Des, The Complete Handbook of Gaelic Games (DBA Publications Limited, 2005).
- Fullam, Brendan, Captains of the Ash (Wolfhound Press, 2002).
