= 1918 All-Ireland Senior Hurling Championship =

All-Ireland champions
- Winning team: Limerick (2nd win)
- Captain: Willie Hough

All-Ireland Finalists
- Losing team: Wexford
- Captain: Mike Cummins

Provincial champions
- Munster: Limerick
- Leinster: Wexford
- Ulster: Not Played
- Connacht: Not Played

Championship statistics
- All-Star Team: See here

The All-Ireland Senior Hurling Championship 1918 was the 32nd staging of the All-Ireland Senior Hurling Championship, the Gaelic Athletic Association's premier inter-county hurling tournament. The championship ran from 19 May 1918 to 26 January 1919.

== Leinster Senior Hurling Championship ==
=== Leinster quarter-finals ===
19 May 1918 Quarter-final	Kilkenny	4–03 – 5–04	Dublin	Kilkenny
				Referee: Dunphy

26 May 1918 Quarter-final	Offaly	3–00 – 2–02	Laois	Roscrea

=== Leinster semi-finals ===
9 June 1918 Semi-final	Meath	1–00 – 6–01	Dublin	Dunboyne
				Referee: AC Harty

29 September 1918 Semi-final	Wexford	1–00 – 6–00	Offaly	Croke Park
				Attendance: 3,000; Referee: B Mockler

=== Leinster final ===
13 October 1918 Final	Wexford	2–03 – 1–02	Dublin	Enniscorthy
				Attendance: 3,000; Referee: W Walsh

== Munster Senior Hurling Championship ==
=== Munster quarter-finals ===
26 May 1918 Quarter-final	Waterford	1–04 – 4–01	Limerick	Waterford
				Referee: A Carew

2 June 1918 Quarter-final	Tipperary	7–03 – 6–01	Cork	Thurles Sportsfield
				Attendance: 5,000; Referee: A Quinlan

=== Munster semi-finals ===
7 July 1918 Semi-final	Limerick	5–03 – 5–03	Tipperary	Markets Field
				Attendance: 4,000

18 August 1918 Semi-final replay	Limerick	3–02 – 2–02	Tipperary	Cork Athletic Grounds
				Attendance: 10,000

25 August 1918 Semi-final	Clare	4–04 – 1–03	Kerry	Markets Field
				Referee: A Quinlan

=== Munster final ===
15 September 1918 Final	Limerick	11–03 – 1–02	Clare	Thurles Sportsfield
				Referee: T Semple (Tipperary)

== All-Ireland Senior Hurling Championship ==
=== All-Ireland final ===
26 January 1919 Final	Limerick	9–05 – 1–03	Wexford	Croke Park
				Attendance: 10,000; Referee: W Walsh

== Championship statistics ==
=== Miscellaneous ===
- Due to Spanish flu most games were delayed.

== Sources ==
- Corry, Eoghan, The GAA Book of Lists (Hodder Headline Ireland, 2005).
- Donegan, Des, The Complete Handbook of Gaelic Games (DBA Publications Limited, 2005).
