= Young Irelands GAA (Limerick) =

Gaelic games club in County Limerick, Ireland

Young Irelands
- Éire Óg
- Founded: 1898
- County: Limerick
- Colours: Blue and gold
- Grounds: Markets Field. Roxboro Road. Lanigan Park, NCR

Playing kits
Standard colours

Senior Club Championships
	All Ireland	Munster champions	Limerick champions
Hurling:	0	0	7

Young Irelands GAA was a Gaelic Athletic Association club based in Limerick, Ireland. The club fielded both underage and adult male sports teams in hurling and Gaelic football. Founded in 1898, it was one of the most successful clubs in the city during the early 20th century, winning seven Limerick Senior Hurling Championship titles between 1902 and 1932. After a period of decline starting in the 1980s, the club eventually disbanded in 1991.

== Formation ==
On 16 November 1898, Young Irelands GAA was established as a boys underage hurling club in Limerick. The first meeting was held at the headquarters of the Young Ireland Society. The club was named after the Young Ireland movement. The attendees at that meeting were Johnny Sweeny, Michael McInerney, James Fitzgerald, Jack Murphy, Pat Cowhey, Jim O’Connell, Paddy O’Farrell, Frank O’Shaughnessy, and Jim Gleeson.

After the first few years interest developed into having a men's team. The new team attracted players from the Shamrocks club, along with adult members of the IRB and of the Young Ireland Society.

In 1902, Young Irelands defeated Monagea to win the first of their seven County Senior Hurling Championships. The six men who won both county titles were James Flanagan, Michael Hogan, Johnny Sweeny, Andy Kelly, M. Slattery and C. Kelly. In later years, Young Irelands won their second senior title in 1910 when they defeated Castleconnell.

== Social Club ==
In 1929, Young Irelands officially opened their club rooms. Young Irelands rented the rooms off the Gaelic League, which had moved out.

Young Irelands GAA hosted lectures, concerts, and a weekly ceilidh in these rooms. The clubhouse facilities included a library and billiard tables. Following their 1928 victory against Rathkeale, the club held a banquet at Cruises Hotel; they were the first club to host such an event to honor a County Championship success.

== Golden Era ==
During the 1920s, Young Irelands GAA frequently played Claughaun, which was headquartered in the same building. Young Irelands trained and played matches at the Markets Field during this era. Near the end of the season, Young Irelands and Garryowen often trained at opposite ends of the field simultaneously.

Young Irelands defeated Newcastlewest in 1920, Bruff in 1922 and Rathkeale in 1928 to capture their fifth County Senior hurling title. In 1927, Young Ireland organized a seven-a-side hurling confined to club members. The team held committee meetings in the Gaelic League Hall every Wednesday.

During 1902 Young Ireland GAA rented a field in Roxboro Road. However, in 1932, due to housing development nearby, the club moved back to Markets Field. Due to rent increase, the club also moved to new quarters at Number 8 The Crescent in 1932 for an annual rent of £100.

In 1930. Young Irelands won the County senior hurling championship, defeating Newcastlewest. They defeated Newcastlewest again in 1932 to capture their last county title.

During the 1930s Young Irelands fielded Senior hurling teams in both Cork and Limerick on the same Sunday . In Cork they played St Finbarrs and at Limericks Gaelic Grounds they lined out another 15 against Cappamore. On another occasion, they travelled by train to Killarney, toured the Lakes, played a senior hurling match against Corks Glen Rovers and a Senior Football match against the local Dr. Crokes.

In 1921, Killaloe-born Bob Mc Conkey lifted the Liam McCarthy while in 1923 Paddy McInerney, who was born in O’Callaghan's Mills but who moved to Limerick at a young age, captained the side. In 1932, Caherconlish-born Mickey Fitzgibbon captained the Limerick side. Mick Kennedy originally from The Ragg in Tipperary captained the side that won Limericks First National hurling league title in 1933–34. Mick Murphy, Willie Gleeson, Paddy McInerney, Denny Lanigan, Bob McConkey, Mick Kennedy all won All Ireland Senior hurling medals with Limerick.

In 1936, Young Irelands reorganized. In 1938 and 1939, the underage teams in hurling and football were successful

== Croom/Young Irelands ==
In 1949 Young Irelands joined with the Croom club. The club officers were: Chairman- L. Jones, Vice Chairman- Bob McConkey, Joint Treasurers- J.Cregan, Jack Cusack, Joint Secretaries- S.English, and Seamus O’Ceallaigh, Captain of Senior Hurling team-P. Cregan. Vice Captain- Jim Sadlier.

The combined hurling team defeated Ahane in the first round of the championship. During the game, Joe Cregan assaulted and seriously injured an Ahane player, Mick Herbert. Cregan was arrested, convicted and sent to prison. Croom /Young Irelands were defeated by St Patricks later on in the championship

At the end of the season the combined club was dissolved.

== Lanigan Memorial Park ==
In 1953, Young Irelands moved to a field in Westfields off North Circular Road. The use of the field was given to them by the Lanigan brothers, Denny and Jack who were builders. Denny who was born in Granagh had played for Young Irelands and Limerick and was part of the famous half back line for the Limerick All Ireland winning team of 1917 that was called the Hindenburg Line. Denny, Jack Keane and Willie Hough formed this half back line. The club had hoped to set up a permanent base in Westfields with a pavilion and call it after their former great player Denny Lanigan. They set up the Lanigan Memorial Park Committee. They put more emphasis on their underage structure as they knew that they could not just rely on players transferring into Limerick.

== Young Irelands/Commercials ==
Young Irelands and Commercials became sister clubs in 1950s. With Young Irelands running the hurling and Commercials managing the football. They fielded underage and adult teams and did relatively well throughout the sixties and early seventies. The club entered a credit scheme for the field in Westfields in 1970, but this new field never materialized and in the 1975 season they were renting a field in Blackwater, which was previously held by Parteen.

== Demise ==
In 1981, Young Irelands failed to field any hurling team. The most players they could muster was 12. The club secretary Maurice Egan said in his report that the most promising development was the relationship between Young Irelands and the new club on the Southside of the city, which was formed in 1979 called Ballinacurra Gaels. Young Irelands and Commercials used Ballinacurra Gaels field, and they assisted them with work on their field. Seamus O' Ceallaigh had been a very prominent Young Irelands clubman throughout the years and he was instrumental in setting up Ballinacurra Gaels. Not long after this, Young Irelands hurling club ceased to be. Its sister club, Commercials soldiered on for another decade and disbanded in 1991.

Young Irelands was never really a parish based club team in the classic sense. They had underage teams for most of their history and focused on developing this side of the club from the fifties onward and, like Commercial, were the club that any outsider who came to the city played for. Other clubs in the city had developed strong roots, however this never materialised with the blue and gold of Young Irelands, who ended up fading out of existence.

== Roll of honour ==
- Limerick Senior Hurling Championship (7): 1902, 1910, 1920, 1922, 1928, 1930, 1932
- Limerick Junior Hurling Championship: 1920
- Limerick Juvenile Hurling Championship: 1904, 1938, 1939
- Limerick Juvenile Football Championship: 1938
- Limerick City Minor Hurling Championship: 1945
- Limerick City Juvenile Hurling Championship: 1938, 1939
- East Limerick Junior Football Championship: 1931
- East Limerick Minor Hurling Championship: 1931
- New Ireland Shield: 1958, 1959, 1967
- Limerick City Junior Hurling League (2): 1919, 1942

=== Notable players ===
- Jack Keane
- Mick Kennedy
- Dinny Lanigan
- Bob McConkey
- Paddy McInerney
- Mick Murphy
