= Neil Montgomery =

Irish hurler

Personal information
- Native name: Niall Mac Iomaire (Irish)
- Born: 1998 (age 27–28) Abbeyside, County Waterford, Ireland
- Occupation: Student
- Height: 6 ft 2 in (188 cm)

Sport
- Sport: Hurling
- Position: Midfield
Club
- Years: Club
- Abbeyside–Ballinacourty
Club titles
- Waterford titles: 0
College
- Years: College
- 2017-2021: University College Cork
College titles
- Fitzgibbon titles: 2
Inter-county*
Years	County	Apps (scores)
2019-present	Waterford	4 (0-03)
Inter-county titles
- Munster titles: 0
- All-Irelands: 0
- NHL: 0
- All Stars: 0
- *Inter County team apps and scores correct as of 21:24, 28 November 2020.

Neil Montgomery (born 1998) is an Irish hurler who plays for Waterford Senior Championship club Abbeyside and at inter-county level with the Waterford senior hurling team. He usually lines out as a midfielder.

== Playing career ==
=== University College Cork ===
As a student at University College Cork, Montgomery earned selection on the university's top hurling team. He was a member of the extended panel when UCC claimed the 2019 Fitzgibbon Cup after a 2–21 to 0–13 defeat of Mary Immaculate College in the final. Montgomery remained a peripheral member of the team for the 2020 Fitzgibbon Cup. In spite of this, he ended the campaign with a second successive Fitzgibbon Cup medal after coming on as a substitute in the 0–18 to 2–11 defeat of the Institute of Technology, Carlow in the 2020 final.

=== Abbeyside–Ballinacourty ===
Montgomery first came to prominence as a hurler with the Abbeyside club, while also playing Gaelic football with sister club Ballinacourty. He enjoyed divisional success in both codes with the respective under-21 teams.

On 7 October 2018, Montgomery was selected at right wing-forward when Abbeyside qualified for the 2018 county final against Ballygunner. He was held scoreless over the hour as Abbeyside suffered a 2–19 to 0–13 defeat.

=== Waterford ===
==== Minor and under-21 ====
Montgomery first played for Waterford as a member of the minor team during the 2016 Munster Minor Championship. He made his debut in that grade on 6 April 2016 when he lined out at full-forward in a 0–17 to 1–10 defeat by Cork, before ending the season without success. Montgomery was subsequently drafted onto the Waterford under-21 team, making his first appearance in a 0–23 to 1–17 defeat by Cork in the 2018 Munster semi-final. A change in the age limit meant that Montgomery was overage for the following year's championship.

==== Senior ====
Montgomery was drafted onto the Waterford senior team by new manager Liam Cahill in advance of the 2020 Munster League. He made his first competitive appearance in a 1–17 to 1–13 defeat by Cork on the opening round of the pre-season competition. Montgomery was subsequently included on Waterford's National League panel and made his first appearance in that competition in a 1–24 to 3–17 victory over Cork in the first round. Montgomery made his championship debut on 31 October 2020, when he came on as a 62nd-minute substitute for Jack Fagan in a 1–28 to 1–24 defeat of Cork in the Munster semi-final. He was again introduced as a substitute after starting on the bench when Waterford suffered a 0–25 to 0–21 defeat by Limerick in the 2020 Munster final. After making appearances of the bench in subsequent defeats of Clare and Kilkenny, Montgomery received his first starting fifteen berth when he was named at centre-forward for the 2020 All-Ireland final against Limerick.

== Career statistics ==
As of match played 28 November 2020.

Team	Year	National League			Munster		All-Ireland		Total	
Team	Year	Division	Apps	Score	Apps	Score	Apps	Score	Apps	Score
Waterford	2020	Division 1A	4	0-01	2	0-00	2	0-03	8	0-04
Career total			4	0-01	2	0-00	2	0-03	8	0-04

== Honours ==
St. Augustine's College

- Munster Colleges Senior C Hurling Championship (1): 2017

University College Cork

- Fitzgibbon Cup (1): 2020
