= Josh Considine =

Irish hurler

Personal information
- Native name: Iósua Mac Consaidín (Irish)
- Born: 2000 (age 25–26) Patrickswell, County Limerick, Ireland
- Occupation: Student

Sport
- Sport: Hurling
- Position: Midfield
Club
- Years: Club
- 2018-present: Patrickswell
Club titles
- Limerick titles: 1
College
- Years: College
- 2020-: Mary Immaculate College
College titles
- Fitzgibbon titles: 0
Inter-county*
| Years | County | Apps (scores) |
| 2019-present | Limerick | 0 (0-00) |
Inter-county titles
- Munster titles: 1
- All-Irelands: 1
- NHL: 1
- All Stars: 0
- *Inter County team apps and scores correct as of 21:43, 22 December 2020.

Josh Considine (born 2000) is an Irish hurler who plays for Limerick Senior Championship club Patrickswell and at inter-county level with the Limerick senior hurling team. He usually lines out at midfield.

== Career statistics ==
As of match played 23 May 2021.

| Team | Year | National League | | | Munster | | All-Ireland | | Total | |
| Team | Year | Division | Apps | Score | Apps | Score | Apps | Score | Apps | Score |
|---|---|---|---|---|---|---|---|---|---|---|
| Limerick | 2020 | Division 1A | 1 | 0-00 | 0 | 0-00 | 0 | 0-00 | 1 | 0-00 |
| | 2021 | Division 1A | 1 | 0-00 | 0 | 0-00 | 0 | 0-00 | 1 | 0-00 |
| Career total | | | 2 | 0-00 | 0 | 0-00 | 0 | 0-00 | 2 | 0-00 |

== Honours ==
Ardscoil Rís

- Dr. Harty Cup (2): 2016/2018
- Dean Ryan Cup (1): 2016

Patrickswell

- Limerick Senior Hurling Championship (1): 2019

Limerick

- All-Ireland Senior Hurling Championship (1): 2020
- Munster Senior Hurling Championship (1): 2020
- National Hurling League (1): 2020
- Munster Senior Hurling League (2): 2020
