= 2020 Munster Senior Hurling Championship =

Sporting competition

Munster Senior Hurling Championship
Tournament details
- Province: Munster
- Year: 2020
- Trophy: The Munster Cup
- Date: 25 October – 15 November 2020
- Teams: 5
- Defending champions: Limerick

Winners
- Champions: Limerick (21st win)
- Manager: John Kiely
- Captain: Declan Hannon
- Qualify for: Munster SHC Final; All-Ireland SHC

Runners-up
- Runners-up: Waterford
- Manager: Liam Cahill
- Captain: Conor Prunty

Other
- Matches played: 4

The 2020 Munster Senior Hurling Championship was the 133rd staging of the Munster Senior Hurling Championship since its establishment by the Gaelic Athletic Association in 1888. The championship fixtures were announced on 10 October 2019, with the championship due to take place between 10 May and 28 June 2020. However, due to the impact of the COVID-19 pandemic on Gaelic games, the draw for a rescheduled championship took place on 26 June 2020 with a new knock-out format being adopted, rescheduled to take place between 24/25 October and 14/15 November 2020. The championship format returned to the round-robin league in 2022.

Limerick were the defending Munster champions. They retained their title, beating Waterford in the final by 4 points. The same two teams went on to contest the All-Ireland hurling final on 13 December, when Limerick won again, this time by 11 points.

== Teams ==
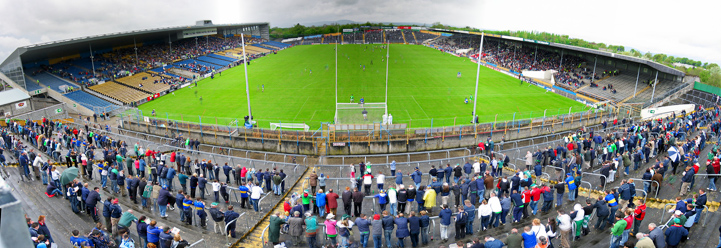
Semple Stadium

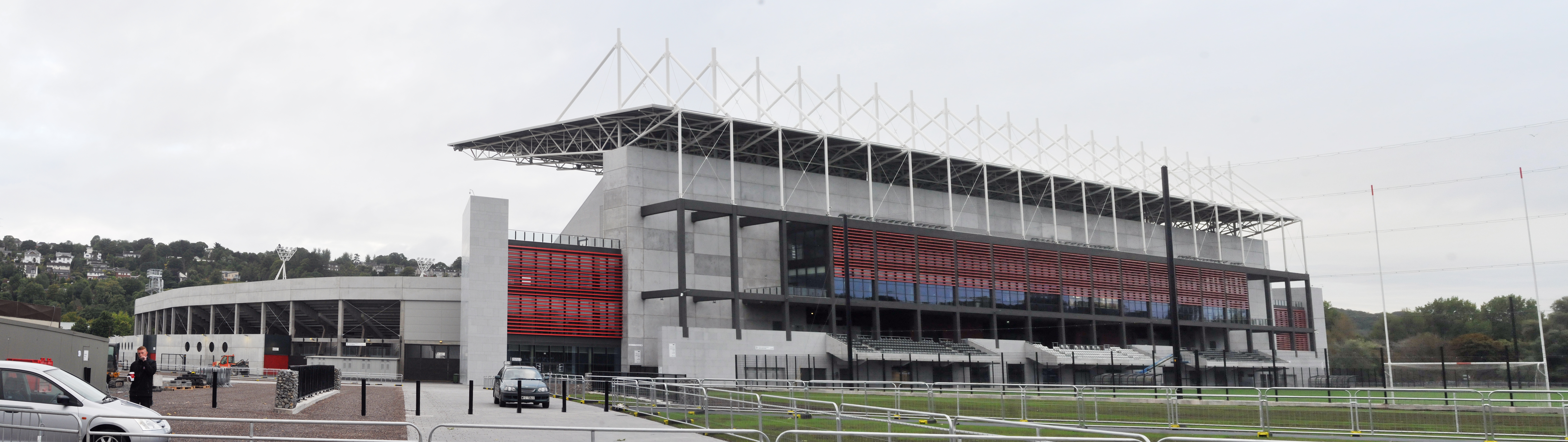
Páirc Uí Chaoimh

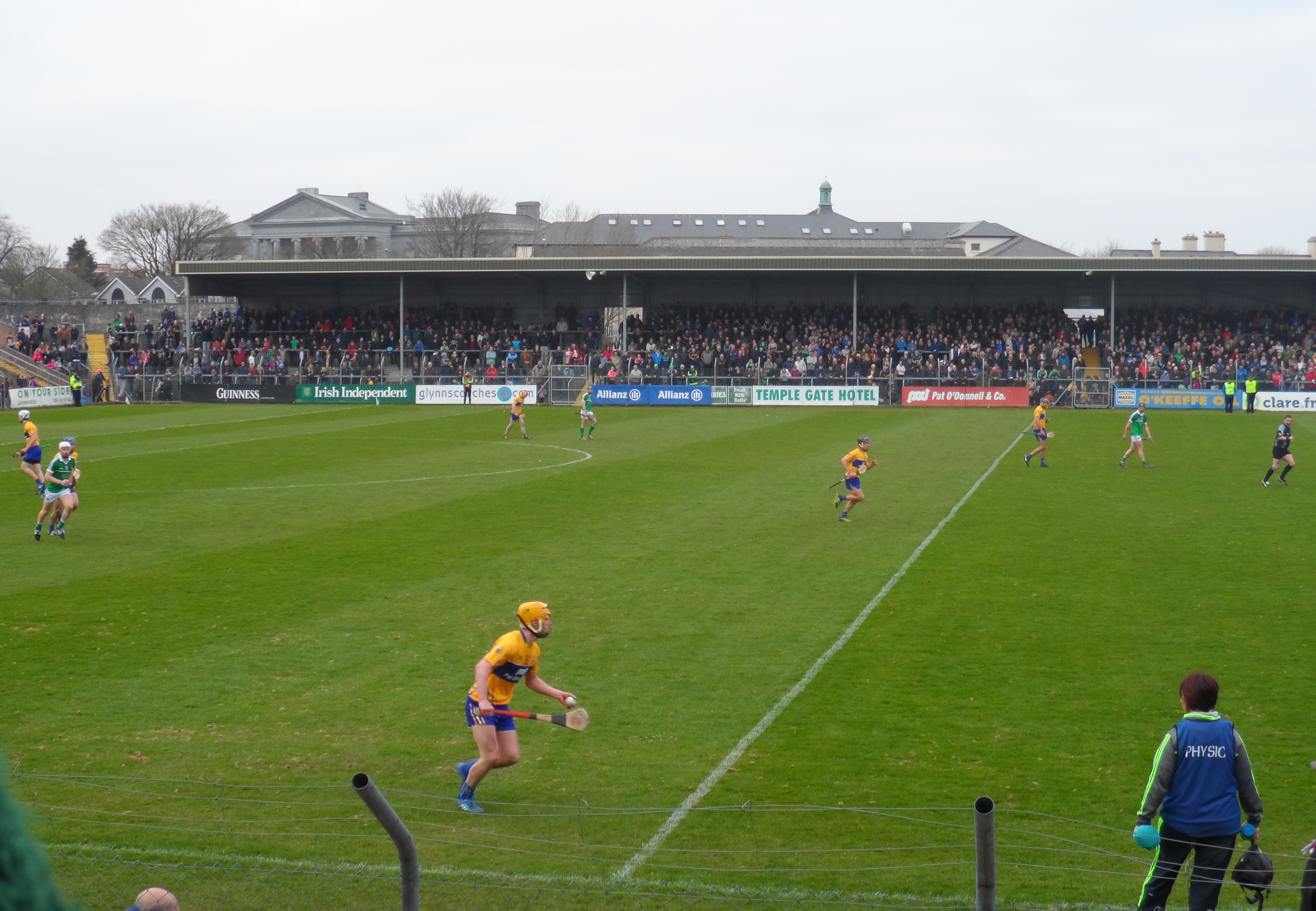
Cusack Park

The Munster championship was contested by five of the six counties from the Irish province of Munster. The exception was Kerry, traditionally the province's weakest at hurling (but strongest in football).

Team	Stadium	Location	Capacity
Clare	Cusack Park	Ennis	19,000
Cork	Páirc Uí Chaoimh	Ballintemple	45,000
Limerick	LIT Gaelic Grounds	Ennis Road	49,866
Tipperary	Semple Stadium	Thurles	45,690
Waterford	Walsh Park	Slievekeale Road	11,046

== Personnel and general information ==
Team	Colours	Manager	Captain	Vice-captain	Sponsor	Most recent success		
Team	Colours	Manager	Captain	Vice-captain	Sponsor	All-Ireland	Provincial	League
Cork		Kieran Kingston	Patrick Horgan		Chill Insurance	2005	2018	1998
Clare		Brian Lohan	John Conlon	David McInerney	Pat O'Donnell	2013	1998	2016
Limerick		John Kiely	Declan Hannon	Cian Lynch	J. P. McManus	2018	2019	2019
Tipperary		Liam Sheedy			Teneo	2019	2016	2008
Waterford		Liam Cahill	Pauric Mahony	Conor Prunty	TQS Integration	1959	2010	2015

== Bracket ==
Quarter-Finals

Semi-Finals

Final

Cork
1-24 (27)

Waterford
1-28 (31)

Waterford
0-21 (21)

Limerick
0-25 (25)

Tipperary
2-17 (23)

Limerick
0-36 (36)

Limerick
3-23 (32)

Clare
1-23 (26)

== Fixtures ==
=== Quarter-final ===
This game is also the 2020 National Hurling League final.

25 October 2020 Quarter-Final	Limerick	0-36 (36) – (26) 1-23	Clare	Thurles
15:45 GMT (UTC±0)				Venue: Semple Stadium

=== Semi-finals ===
31 October 2020 Semi-final	Cork	1-24 (27) – (31) 1-28	Waterford	Thurles
15:30 GMT (UTC±0)				Venue: Semple Stadium

1 November 2020 Semi-final	Tipperary	2-17 (23) – (32) 3-23	Limerick
16:00 GMT (UTC±0)

=== Final ===
15 November 2020
16:00 GMT (UTC±0)
Munster final

Waterford	0-21 (21) – (25) 0-25	Limerick

Semple Stadium, Thurles
Referee: Colm Lyons (Cork)

== See also ==
- 2020 All-Ireland Senior Hurling Championship
  - 2020 Leinster Senior Hurling Championship
  - 2020 Joe McDonagh Cup
