= 2020 All-Ireland Senior Hurling Championship final =

- Event: 2020 All-Ireland Senior Hurling Championship
Waterford	Limerick
0–19	0–30
- Date: 13 December 2020
- Venue: Croke Park, Dublin
- Man of the Match: Gearóid Hegarty
- Referee: Fergal Horgan
- Attendance: 0 (Covid final)
- Weather: Dry

The 2020 All-Ireland Senior Hurling Championship Final was a hurling match played at Croke Park in Dublin on 13 December 2020 between Limerick and Waterford, the culmination of the 2020 All-Ireland Senior Hurling Championship. It was the 133rd final of that sport's primary competition, the All-Ireland Senior Hurling Championship.

Limerick won the game by 0–30 to 0–19 to claim their second All-Ireland title in three years.

The match was televised live on RTÉ2 as part of The Sunday Game, presented by Joanne Cantwell from the outside studio at Croke Park, with analysis by Anthony Daly, Donal Óg Cusack and Henry Shefflin. Commentary on the game was provided by Marty Morrissey alongside Michael Duignan. The match was also live on Sky Sports, with analysis from Jamesie O'Connor and Ollie Canning.

== Background ==
- The championship was delayed due to the impact of the COVID-19 pandemic on Gaelic games. This was the latest the final had taken place in a year since 1924, when the All-Ireland hurling final took place on 14 December.
- Waterford had not won the All-Ireland since 1959 (61 years) and had only appeared in three finals in the interim (1963, 2008 and 2017).
- This was the third final in the previous four years not to involve one of the Big Three (Cork, Kilkenny, Tipperary) — the 2017 (Galway—Waterford) and 2018 (Limerick—Galway) finals also did not involve them.
- This was the third final in which both the teams were from the province of Munster, with the first two being in 1997 (Clare—Tipperary) and 2013 (Clare—Cork).
- This was only the third All-Ireland final in history in which neither team scored a goal, the first two being in 1999 and 2004.

== Paths to the final ==
=== Waterford ===
31 October 2020 Munster Semi-Final	Cork	1-24 (27) – (31) 1-28	Waterford	Thurles
15:30				Venue: Semple Stadium
	Gls: P Horgan 1 (f). Pts: P Horgan 8 (3f); S Kingston 4; S Harnedy 2; M Coleman 2 (1 sideline), B Cooper 2, C Lehane 2; C Joyce 1, D Dalton 1, A Cadogan 1.	Report	Gls: C Lyons 1. Pts: S Bennett 12 (12f); A Gleeson 3, D Hutchinson 3, J Barron 3; C Lyons 2; S McNulty 1, K Moran 1, K Bennett 1, J Prendergast 1, P Curran 1.	TV: Sky Sports

15 November 2020 Munster Final	Limerick	0-25 (25) – (21) 0-21	Waterford	Thurles
16:00				Venue: Semple Stadium
	Pts: A Gillane 10 (8f); G Mulcahy 4; P Casey 3; D Byrnes 2 (1 65), C Lynch 2, G Hegarty 2; S Flanagan 1, A Breen 1.	Report	Pts: Stephen Bennett 12 (8f, 1 65); A Gleeson 3; J Dillon 2; D Hutchinson 1, K Bennett 1, J Prendergast 1, P Curran 1.	Referee: C Lyons (Cork)

21 November 2020 All-Ireland Quarter-Final	Waterford	3-27 (36) – (27) 3-18	Clare	Cork
				Venue: Páirc Uí Chaoimh
	Gls: D Hutchinson 2, J Fagan 1. Pts: S Bennett 10 (7f); K Bennett 3; D Hutchinson 2, A Gleeson 2, C Gleeson 2, J Barron 2, N Montgomery 1, C Lyons 1, P Curran 1, T de Burca 1, D Lyons 1, J Fagan 1.	Report	Gls: A Shanagher 2, A McCarthy 1. Pts: T Kelly 8 (6f); C Malone 4; S O’Donnell 2; A Shanagher 1, D Reidy 1, R Taylor 1, D McInerney 1 (sideline).	Referee: P O'Dwyer (Carlow); TV: Sky Sports Mix

28 November 2020 All-Ireland Semi-Final	Kilkenny	2-23 (29) – (33) 2-27	Waterford	Dublin
				Venue: Croke Park
	Gls: TJ Reid 1, M Keoghan 1. Pts: TJ Reid 14 (12fs); E Cody 2, R Hogan 2, J Donnelly 2; C Buckley 1, P Deegan 1, M Keoghan 1.	Report	Gls: S Bennett 1, D Lyons 1. Pts: S Bennett 10 (6fs), A Gleeson 4; C Lyons 2, J Prendergast 2, D Hutchinson 2, N Montgomery 2; S McNulty 1, J Barron 1, J Fagan 1, I Daly 1, T de Búrca 1.	Referee: F Horgan (Tipperary)

=== Limerick ===
25 October 2020 Munster Quarter-Final	Limerick	0-36 (36) – (26) 1-23	Clare	Thurles
15:45 GMT (UTC±0)				Venue: Semple Stadium
	Pts: A Gillane 12 (9f, 1 65); G Hegarty 5; T Morrissey 4; P Casey 3, K Hayes 3, D Byrnes 3; G Mulcahy 2; C Lynch 1, D Hannon 1, S Flanagan 1, P Ryan 1.	Report	Gls: R Taylor 1. Pts: T Kelly 17 (9f); D Ryan 2, C Malone 2; S O’Halloran 1, R Taylor 1.	Referee: F Horgan (Tipperary); TV: RTÉ 2

1 November 2020 Munster Semi-Final	Tipperary	2-17 (23) – (32) 3-23	Limerick	Cork
16:00				Venue: Pairc Ui Chaoimh
	Gls: J Morris 1, J McGrath 1. Pts: J Forde 10 (10f); N McGrath 2; J Morris 1; B Maher 1; N O'Meara 1; M Breen 1; A Flynn 1.		Gls: A Gillane 2 (1 pen); S Flanagan 1. Pts: A Gillane 6 (5f); D Byrnes 3 (2f); T Morrissey 2; G Hegarty 2; W O'Donoghue 2; C Lynch 2; G Mulcahy 2; S Flanagan 1; P Casey 1; D Reidy 1; P Ryan 1.	TV: RTÉ 2

15 November 2020 Munster Final	Limerick	0-25 (25) – (21) 0-21	Waterford	Thurles
16:00				Venue: Semple Stadium
	Pts: A Gillane 10 (8f); G Mulcahy 4; P Casey 3; D Byrnes 2 (1 65), C Lynch 2, G Hegarty 2; S Flanagan 1, A Breen 1.	Report	Pts: Stephen Bennett 12 (8f, 1 65); A Gleeson 3; J Dillon 2; D Hutchinson 1, K Bennett 1, J Prendergast 1, P Curran 1.	Referee: C Lyons (Cork)

29 November 2020 All-Ireland Semi-Final	Limerick	0-27 (27) – (24) 0-24	Galway	Dublin
				Venue: Croke Park

== Pre-match ==
The 2020 Joe McDonagh Cup final between Kerry and Antrim took place prior to the All-Ireland senior final.

On 4 December 2020, the officials were chosen for the final by the GAA, with Tipperary's Fergal Horgan being named as the referee in what would be his second senior final after being the referee in 2017. Colm Lyons from Cork was named as standby referee, with the other linesman being Paud O'Dwyer from Carlow and the sideline official Seán Cleere from Kilkenny.

=== Jubilee team ===
The Clare team that won the 1995 All-Ireland Final were remembered before the match to mark 25 years. There was no traditional walk out and parade due to COVID-19 restrictions but the Clare captain of 1995 Anthony Daly was present to place the Liam MacCarthy Cup in front of the Hogan Stand before the match.

== Match details ==
RTÉ, Sky Sports

13 December 2020
15:30
All-Ireland Final

Report

Waterford	0-19 – 0-30	Limerick
(HT: 0-11 - 0-14)
Pts: S Bennett 10 (9fs); A Gleeson 5 (1 sideline, 1f); K Bennett 1, D Hutchinson 1, K Moran 1, C Lyons 1.		Pts: A Gillane 10 (6fs); G Hegarty 7; T Morrissey 5; S Flanagan 3; W O’Donoghue 1, D Hannon 1, K Hayes 1, P Ryan 1, D Byrnes 1.

Croke Park, Dublin
Referee: F Horgan (Tipperary)
Attendance: 0

Waterford
Limerick

WATERFORD:
1	Stephen O'Keeffe
2	Ian Kenny
3	Conor Prunty
4	Shane McNulty
5	Calum Lyons
6	Tadhg de Búrca
7	Kevin Moran
8	Jamie Barron
9	Kieran Bennett
10	Jack Fagan
11	Neil Montgomery
12	Stephen Bennett
13	Dessie Hutchinson
14	Austin Gleeson
15	Jack Prendergast
Manager:
Liam Cahill

LIMERICK:
1	Nicky Quaid
2	Seán Finn
3	Dan Morrissey
4	Barry Nash
5	Diarmaid Byrnes
6	Declan Hannon
7	Kyle Hayes
8	Darragh O'Donovan
9	William O'Donoghue
10	Gearóid Hegarty
11	Cian Lynch
12	Tom Morrissey
13	Aaron Gillane
14	Séamus Flanagan
15	Graeme Mulcahy
Manager:
John Kiely

== Post-match ==
Financial Times columnist Simon Kuper wrote after Stephen O'Keeffe's performance that hurling was "the best sport ever and if the Irish had colonised the world, nobody would ever have heard of football".
