= 2020 All-Ireland Senior Hurling Championship =

Championship details
- Dates: 24 October - 13 December 2020
- Teams: 10

All-Ireland champions
- Winning team: Limerick (9th win)
- Captain: Declan Hannon
- Manager: John Kiely

All-Ireland Finalists
- Losing team: Waterford
- Captain: Conor Prunty
- Manager: Liam Cahill

Provincial champions
- Munster: Limerick
- Leinster: Kilkenny
- Ulster: Not Played
- Connacht: Not Played

Championship statistics
- No. matches played: 17
- Goals total: 41 (2.41 per game)
- Points total: 787 (46.29 per game)
- Top Scorer: Stephen Bennett (1–54)
- All-Star Team: See here

The 2020 All-Ireland Senior Hurling Championship (SHC) was the 133rd staging of the All-Ireland Senior Hurling Championship, the Gaelic Athletic Association's premier inter-county hurling tournament, since its establishment in 1887. The 2020 fixtures were announced in October 2019. Games were initially scheduled to begin on 9 May 2020. Due to the impact of the COVID-19 pandemic on Gaelic games, the competition was delayed before beginning on 24 October 2020 and ending on 13 December 2020.

Laois returned to the Leinster Championship for the first time since 2017, replacing Carlow who were relegated in 2019. Tipperary entered the competition as the defending champion, attempting to retain the title for the first time since 1965. Galway eliminated Tipperary with a defeat in the All-Ireland SHC quarter-final.

In the final, held at Croke Park on 13 December 2020, Limerick won the competition with a 0–30 to 0–19 win against Waterford. It was the team's ninth title, as well as a first title since 2018.

Waterford's Stephen Bennett was the competition's top scorer, finishing with 1–54.

== Format ==
Initially, the 2020 All-Ireland hurling championship format was to feature five-team groups in both Leinster and Munster and the two Joe McDonagh Cup finalists in the format introduced in 2018 for an initial three-year period. At the GAA Congress on 29 February 2019 it was decided to expand the Leinster Hurling Championship from five to six teams, beginning in 2021. This meant there would be no relegation from the Leinster Hurling Championship in 2020 and that the winners of the Joe McDonagh Cup would be promoted.

Due to the COVID-19 pandemic in Ireland, some changes were announced on 26 June 2020. The format reverted to knockout provincial championships, along with qualifiers, similar to the 2017 format. The two Joe McDonagh Cup finalists did not compete in the senior championship.

The draws for the Munster and Leinster Senior Hurling Championships took place live on RTÉ's Six One news on Friday 26 June.

=== Leinster Championship ===
Participating counties (5): Dublin, Galway, Kilkenny, Laois, Wexford

Quarter-finals (1 match): This are one match between the first two teams drawn – the other three teams receive a bye. One team is eliminated at this stage while the winners advance to the semi-finals.

Semi-finals (2 matches): The winners of the quarter-final join the other three teams to make up the semi-final pairings. Two teams are eliminated at this stage while the winners advance to the final.

Final (1 match): The winners of the two semi-finals contest this game. The Leinster champions advance to the All-Ireland semi-finals and the Leinster runners-up advance to the All-Ireland quarter-finals.

=== Munster Championship ===
Participating counties (5): Clare, Cork, Limerick, Tipperary, Waterford

Quarter-finals (1 match): This are one match between the first two teams drawn – the other three teams receive a bye. One team is eliminated at this stage while the winners advance to the semi-finals.

Semi-finals (2 matches): The winners of the quarter-final join the other three teams to make up the semi-final pairings. Two teams are eliminated at this stage while the winners advance to the final.

Final (1 match): The winners of the two semi-finals contest this game. The Munster champions advance to the All-Ireland semi-finals and the Munster runners-up advance to the All-Ireland quarter-finals.

=== All-Ireland Championship ===
Qualifiers round 1 (2 matches): The six teams who failed to reach a provincial final enter this round. These are two matches between the first four teams drawn – the other two teams receive a bye. Two teams are eliminated at this stage while the winners advance to the qualifiers round 2.

Qualifiers round 2 (2 matches): The winners of the qualifiers round 1 join the other two teams to make up the qualifiers round 2 pairings. Two teams are eliminated at this stage while the winners advance to the quarter-finals.

Quarter-finals (2 matches): The winners of the preliminary quarter-finals join the Leinster and Munster runners-up to make up the quarter-final pairings. Teams who may have already met in the provincial championships are kept apart in separate quarter-finals. Two teams are eliminated at this stage while the winners advance to the semi-finals.

Semi-finals (2 matches): The winners of the quarter-finals join the Leinster and Munster champions to make up the semi-final pairings. Teams who may have met in the provincial finals are kept apart in separate semi-finals where possible. Two teams are eliminated at this stage while the winners advance to the final.

Final (1 match): The two winners of the semi-finals contest this game.

== Team changes ==
=== From Championship ===
Relegated to the Christy Ring Cup

- Offaly

Excluded from the Championship

- Antrim
- Carlow
- Kerry
- Meath
- Westmeath

== Teams ==
=== General information ===
Ten counties will compete in the All-Ireland Senior Hurling Championship: five teams in the Leinster Senior Hurling Championship and five teams in the Munster Senior Hurling Championship.

County	Last provincial title	Last championship title	Position in 2019 championship	Current championship
Clare	1998	2013	4th (Munster Senior Hurling Championship)	Munster Senior Hurling Championship
Cork	2018	2005	Quarter-finals	Munster Senior Hurling Championship
Dublin	2013	1938	Preliminary quarter-finals	Leinster Senior Hurling Championship
Galway	2018	2017	4th (Leinster Senior Hurling Championship)	Leinster Senior Hurling Championship
Kilkenny	2016	2015	Runners-up	Leinster Senior Hurling Championship
Laois	1949	1915	Quarter-finals	Leinster Senior Hurling Championship
Limerick	2019	2018	Semi-finals	Munster Senior Hurling Championship
Tipperary	2016	2019	Champions	Munster Senior Hurling Championship
Waterford	2010	1959	5th (Munster Senior Hurling Championship)	Munster Senior Hurling Championship
Wexford	2019	1996	Semi-finals	Leinster Senior Hurling Championship

=== Stadiums and locations ===
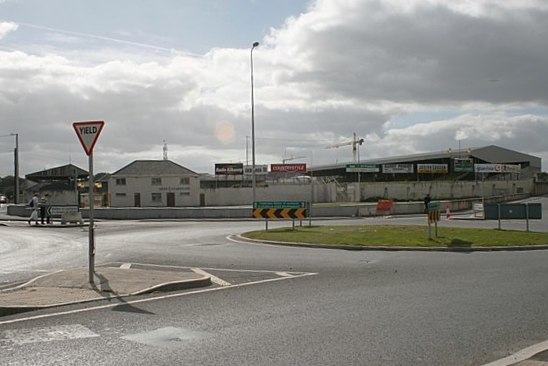
UPMC Nowlan Park

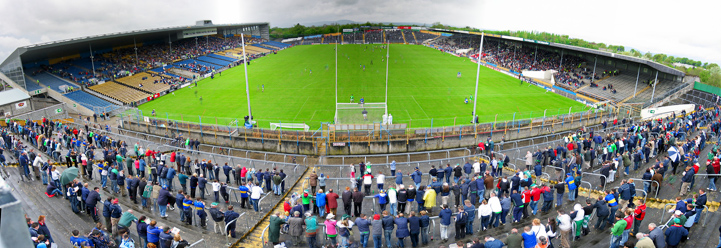
Semple Stadium

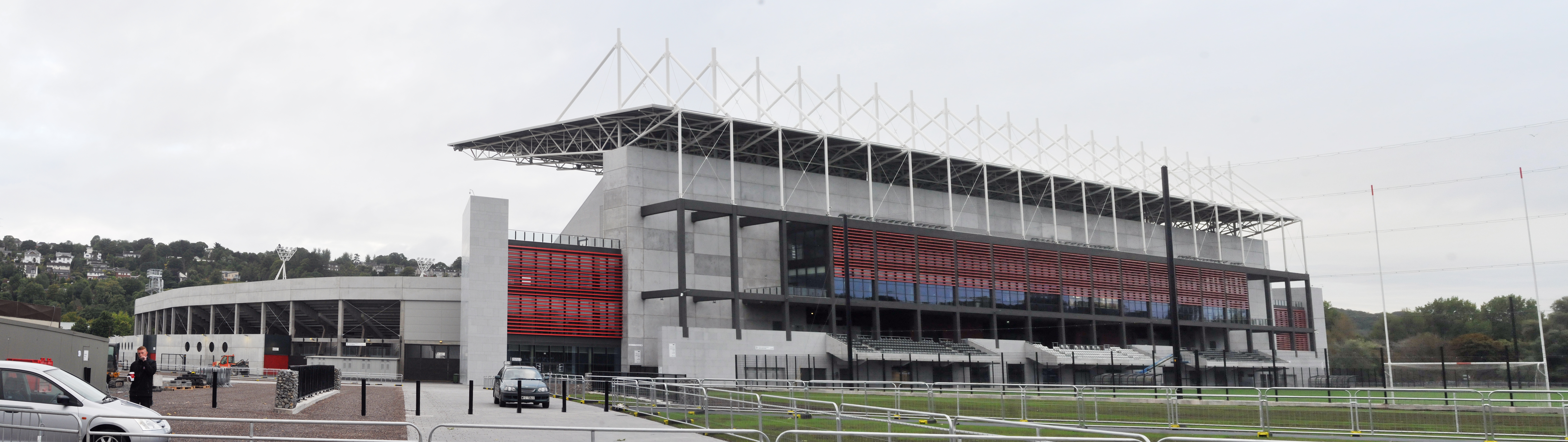
Páirc Uí Chaoimh

Team	Stadium	Location	Capacity
[Usually Dublin]	Croke Park	Jones' Road	82,300
Cork	Páirc Uí Chaoimh	Ballintemple	45,000
Kilkenny	UPMC Nowlan Park	O'Loughlin Road	27,800
Laois	O'Moore Park	Portlaoise	18,000
Limerick	TUS Gaelic Grounds	Ennis Road	49,866
Tipperary	Semple Stadium	Thurles	45,690

=== Personnel and general information ===
Team	Manager	Captain(s)	Vice-captain	Sponsor
Clare	Brian Lohan	John Conlon	David McInerney	Pat O'Donnell
Cork	Kieran Kingston	Patrick Horgan		Chill Insurance
Dublin	Mattie Kenny	Danny Sutcliffe		AIG
Galway	Shane O'Neill	Pádraic Mannion	Conor Whelan	Supermacs
Kilkenny	Brian Cody	Colin Fennelly	Joey Holden	Glanbia
Laois	Eddie Brennan	Enda Rowland	Willie Dunphy	MW Hire Group
Limerick	John Kiely	Declan Hannon	Cian Lynch	J. P. McManus
Tipperary	Liam Sheedy	Séamus Callanan		Teneo
Waterford	Liam Cahill	Pauric Mahony	Conor Prunty	TQS Integration
Wexford	Davy Fitzgerald	Lee Chin; Matthew O'Hanlon		Zurich Insurance

== Summary ==
=== Championships ===
Level on Pyramid	Competition	Champions	Runners-up
Tier 1	2020 All-Ireland Senior Hurling Championship	Limerick	Waterford
Tier 1 (Leinster)	2020 Leinster Senior Hurling Championship	Kilkenny	Galway
Tier 1 (Munster)	2020 Munster Senior Hurling Championship	Limerick	Waterford
Tier 2	2020 Joe McDonagh Cup	Antrim	Kerry
Tier 3	2020 Christy Ring Cup	Kildare	Down
Tier 4	2020 Nicky Rackard Cup	Donegal	Mayo
Tier 5	2020 Lory Meagher Cup	Louth	Fermanagh

== Provincial championships ==
=== Leinster Senior Hurling Championship ===
Quarter-finals
Dublin	2–31
Laois	0–23

Semi-finals
Kilkenny	3–20
Dublin	2–22
Galway	1–27
Wexford	0–17

Final
Kilkenny	2–20
Galway	0–24

==== Leinster Quarter-final ====
24 October 2020 Quarter-final	Dublin	2–31 (37) – (23) 0–23	Laois	Dublin
18:00		(HT: 1–16 – 0–12)		Venue: Croke Park
	Gls: D Burke 1, E Dillon 1. Pts: D Burke 16 (11f, 2 ’65), C Crummey 3, C Burke 2, R McBride 2, D Sutcliffe 2, C Boland 2, S Moran 1, D Keogh 1, E Dillon 1, M Schutte 1.	Report	Pts: R King 10 (9f, 1 ’65), S Maher 2, A Dunphy 2, E Rowland 2 (2f), P Purcell 2, P Delaney 1, R Mullaney 1, F Fennell 1, J Kelly 1, J Ryan 1.	Referee: P O’Dwyer (Carlow); TV: Sky Sports

==== Leinster Semi-finals ====
31 October 2020 Semi-final	Kilkenny	3–20 (29) – (28) 2–22	Dublin	Dublin
15:45				Venue: Croke Park
	Gls: TJ Reid 1, B Ryan 1, C Fennelly 1. Pts: TJ Reid 10 (6f), W Walsh 2, J Donnelly 2, E Cody 1, C Delaney 1, A Murphy 1, H Lawlor 1, C Fennelly 1, B Ryan 1.	Report	Gls: C Crummey 1, R Hayes 1. Pts: D Burke 12 (10f), E Dillon 4, C Boland 2, D Gray 2, D Sutcliffe 1, C Crummey 1.	TV: GAAGO

31 October 2020 Semi-final	Galway	1–27 (30) – (17) 0–17	Wexford	Dublin
18:15				Venue: Croke Park
	Gls: B Concannon 1. Pts: J Canning 9 (7f, 1 65, 1 sideline); B Concannon 4; C Whelan 4; C Mannion 2, P Mannion 2, S Loftus 2; F Burke 1, J Flynn 1, J Coen 1, S Cooney 1.	Report	Pts: L Chin 8 (5f); R O’Connor 3; P Foley 2 (1 65); M Fanning 1 (f), A Nolan 1, P Morris 1, K Foley 1.	TV: RTÉ 2

==== Leinster final ====
14 November 2020 Final	Kilkenny	2–20 (26) – (24) 0–24	Galway	Dublin
		(HT: 0–12 – 0–13)		Venue: Croke Park
	Gls: TJ Reid 1, R Hogan 1. Pts: TJ Reid 10 (9fs); R Hogan 2, C Browne 2, M Keogan 2, J Donnelly 1, E Cody 1, P Walsh 1, L Blanchfield 1.	Report	Pts: J Canning 14 (9fs, 1 sideline, 1 65), C Whelan 2, J Coen 2, David Burke 2, C Mannion 1, J Cooney 1, B Concannon 1, J Flynn 1.	Referee: F Horgan (Tipperary); TV: RTÉ

=== Munster Senior Hurling Championship ===
Five of the six Munster counties participate. Kerry compete in the Joe McDonagh Cup. The competition is entirely knock-out.

Quarter-Finals

Semi-Finals

Final

Cork
1-24 (27)

Waterford
1-28 (31)

Waterford
0-21 (21)

Limerick
0-25 (25)

Tipperary
2-17 (23)

Limerick
0-36 (36)

Limerick
3-23 (32)

Clare
1-23 (26)

==== Munster quarter-final ====
25 October 2020 Quarter-final	Limerick	0–36 (36) – (26) 1–23	Clare	Thurles
15:45 GMT (UTC±0)				Venue: Semple Stadium
	Pts: A Gillane 12 (9f, 1 65); G Hegarty 5; T Morrissey 4; P Casey 3, K Hayes 3, D Byrnes 3; G Mulcahy 2; C Lynch 1, D Hannon 1, S Flanagan 1, P Ryan 1.	Report	Gls: R Taylor 1. Pts: T Kelly 17 (9f); D Ryan 2, C Malone 2; S O’Halloran 1, R Taylor 1.	Referee: F Horgan (Tipperary); TV: RTÉ 2

==== Munster semi-finals ====
31 October 2020 Semi-final	Cork	1–24 (27) – (31) 1–28	Waterford	Thurles
15:30				Venue: Semple Stadium
	Gls: P Horgan 1 (f). Pts: P Horgan 8 (3f); S Kingston 4; S Harnedy 2; M Coleman 2 (1 sideline), B Cooper 2, C Lehane 2; C Joyce 1, D Dalton 1, A Cadogan 1.	Report	Gls: C Lyons 1. Pts: S Bennett 12 (12f); A Gleeson 3, D Hutchinson 3, J Barron 3; C Lyons 2; S McNulty 1, K Moran 1, K Bennett 1, J Prendergast 1, P Curran 1.	TV: Sky Sports

1 November 2020 Semi-final	Tipperary	2–17 (23) – (32) 3–23	Limerick	Cork
16:00				Venue: Pairc Ui Chaoimh
	Gls: J Morris 1, J McGrath 1. Pts: J Forde 10 (10f); N McGrath 2; J Morris 1; B Maher 1; N O'Meara 1; M Breen 1; A Flynn 1.	Report	Gls: A Gillane 2 (1 pen); S Flanagan 1. Pts: A Gillane 6 (5f); D Byrnes 3 (2f); T Morrissey 2; G Hegarty 2; W O'Donoghue 2; C Lynch 2; G Mulcahy 2; S Flanagan 1; P Casey 1; D Reidy 1; P Ryan 1.	TV: RTÉ 2

==== Munster final ====
15 November 2020 Final	Limerick	0–25 (25) – (21) 0–21	Waterford	Thurles
16:00				Venue: Semple Stadium
	Pts: A Gillane 10 (8f); G Mulcahy 4; P Casey 3; D Byrnes 2 (1 65), C Lynch 2, G Hegarty 2; S Flanagan 1, A Breen 1.	Report	Pts: Stephen Bennett 12 (8f, 1 65); A Gleeson 3; J Dillon 2; D Hutchinson 1, K Bennett 1, J Prendergast 1, P Curran 1.	Referee: C Lyons (Cork); TV: RTÉ

== Qualifiers ==
Round 1
Laois	3–17
Clare	0–27
Dublin	0–22
Cork	1–25

Round 2
Wexford	0–17
Clare	1–21
Cork	1–17
Tipperary	2–18

All-Ireland Quarter-finals
Clare
Tipperary

Of the six teams who don't reach their provincial final (three from the Leinster championship and three from the Munster championship) four are drawn, two from Leinster versus two from Munster, to play in round one of the qualifiers, subject to the requirement that the two beaten provincial quarter-finalists play in round one. The two teams given byes play the round one winners in round two.

The winners of round two competed in the two All-Ireland quarter-finals against the beaten Leinster and Munster finalists.

=== Round 1 ===
7 November 2020 Round 1	Laois	3–17 (26) – (27) 0–27	Clare	Kilkenny
13:15 GMT				Venue: Nowlan Park
	Gls: R King 1, J Keyes 1, A Dunphy 1. Pts: M Kavanagh 6 (3f, 1 sideline), R King 2 (2f), W Dunphy 2, P Purcell 2, J Kelly 1, P Delaney 1, C McEvoy 1, J Keyes 1, A Dunphy 1.	Report	Pts: T Kelly 13 (9f), A Shanagher 3, C Malone 2, D McInerney 2, R Taylor 2, S Morey 2, C Guilfoyle 1, R Hayes 1, A McCarthy (1f) 1.	Referee: T Walsh (Waterford); TV: GAAGO

7 November 2020 Round 1	Dublin	0–22 (22) – (28) 1–25	Cork	Thurles
15:45 GMT				Venue: Semple Stadium
	Pts: D Burke 12 (9f); C Crummey 3; D Sutcliffe 2, C Boland 2; R Hayes 1, C Burke 1, D Keogh 1.	Report	Gls: D Dalton 1. Pts: P Horgan 8 (5f, 1 65); R O’Flynn 5, S Harnedy 5, S Kingston 4, D Dalton 1, L Meade 1, J O’Connor 1.	Referee: J Keenan (Wicklow); TV: Sky Sports Mix

=== Round 2 ===
14 November 2020 Round 2	Wexford	0–17 (17) – (24) 1–21	Clare	Portlaoise
				Venue: O'Moore Park
	Pts: P Morris 6 (55f); S Murphy 3, P Foley 3 (1f); R O’Connor 2; C McDonald 1, D Dunne 1, K Foley 1.	Report	Gls: T Kelly 1. Pts: T Kelly 15 (8f, 1 65); J McCarthy 2; J Malone 1, C Guilfoyle 1, D Ryan 1, D Fitzgerald 1.	Referee: L Gordon (Galway); TV: Sky Sports Mix

14 November 2020 Round 2	Tipperary	2–18 (24) – (20) 1–17	Cork	Limerick
				Venue: LIT Gaelic Grounds
	Gls: J Forde 1., J Morris 1. Pts: J Forde 6 (5f); M Breen 5; S Callanan 2, D McCormack 2, P Flynn 2; W Connors 1.	Report	Gls: P Horgan 1. Pts: P Horgan 8 (1 65 7f); S Harnedy 4; S. Kingston 1, D Dalton 1, T O’Mahony 1, R O’Flynn 1, B Cooper 1.	Referee: J Owens (Wexford); TV: Sky Sports Mix

== Bracket ==
Quarter-finals
Galway	3–23
Tipperary	2–24
Clare	3–18
Waterford	3–27

Semi-finals
Limerick	0–27
Galway	0–24
Kilkenny	2–23
Waterford	2–27

Final
Limerick	0–30
Waterford	0–19

== Quarter-finals ==
21 November 2020 Quarter-final	Galway	3–23 (32) – (30) 2–24	Tipperary	Limerick
				Venue: Gaelic Grounds
	Gls: C Mannion 1, A Harte 1, B Concannon 1. Pts: J Canning 14 (12f, 1 sideline); C Mannion 3; J Cooney 1, J Coen 1, C Cooney 1, C Whelan 1, J Flynn 1, S Loftus 1.	Report	Gls: S Callanan 1, Patrick Maher 1. Pts: J Forde 6 (5f); N McGrath 4; S Callanan 2; A Flynn 2, M Breen 2, D McCormack 2; J Morris 1, N O’Meara 1, B Heffernan 1, W Connors 1, R Maher 1 (free), B Hogan 1 (f).	Referee: J Murphy (Limerick); TV: RTÉ

21 November 2020 Quarter-final	Waterford	3–27 (36) – (27) 3–18	Clare	Cork
				Venue: Páirc Uí Chaoimh
	Gls: D Hutchinson 2, J Fagan 1. Pts: S Bennett 10 (7f); K Bennett 3; D Hutchinson 2, A Gleeson 2, C Gleeson 2, J Barron 2, N Montgomery 1, C Lyons 1, P Curran 1, T de Burca 1, D Lyons 1, J Fagan 1.	Report	Gls: A Shanagher 2, A McCarthy 1. Pts: T Kelly 8 (6f); C Malone 4; S O’Donnell 2; A Shanagher 1, D Reidy 1, R Taylor 1, D McInerney 1 (sideline).	Referee: P O'Dwyer (Carlow); TV: Sky Sports Mix

== Semi-finals ==
The Leinster and Munster champions play the winners of the two quarter-finals.

28 November 2020 Semi-final	Kilkenny	2–23 (29) – (33) 2–27	Waterford	Dublin
		(HT: 2–11 – 0–10)		Venue: Croke Park
	Gls: TJ Reid 1, M Keoghan 1. Pts: TJ Reid 14 (12fs); E Cody 2, R Hogan 2, J Donnelly 2; C Buckley 1, P Deegan 1, M Keoghan 1.	Report	Gls: S Bennett 1, D Lyons 1. Pts: S Bennett 10 (6fs), A Gleeson 4; C Lyons 2, J Prendergast 2, D Hutchinson 2, N Montgomery 2; S McNulty 1, J Barron 1, J Fagan 1, I Daly 1, T de Búrca 1.	Referee: F Horgan (Tipperary); TV: RTÉ, Sky Sports

29 November 2020 Semi-final	Limerick	0–27 (27) – (24) 0–24	Galway	Dublin
		(HT: 0–15 – 0–13)		Venue: Croke Park
	Pts: A Gillane 6 (5fs), T Morrissey 6 (1f); G Hegarty 4; D Byrnes 3 (1f); S Flanagan 2, P Casey 2, C Lynch 2; D Hannon 1, A Breen 1.	Report	Pts: J Canning 12 (8fs, 4 sideline); B Concannon 3, C Whelan 3; E Niland 2 (1f); C Mannion 1, A Tuohey 1, J Cooney 1, F Burke 1 (sideline).	Referee: J Owens (Wexford); TV: RTÉ, Sky Sports

=== Final ===
RTÉ, Sky Sports

13 December 2020
15:30
All-Ireland Final

Report

Waterford	0–19 – 0–30	Limerick
(HT: 0–11 – 0–14)
Pts: S Bennett 10 (9fs); A Gleeson 5 (1 sideline, 1f); K Bennett 1, D Hutchinson 1, K Moran 1, C Lyons 1.		Pts: A Gillane 10 (6fs); G Hegarty 7; T Morrissey 5; S Flanagan 3; W O’Donoghue 1, D Hannon 1, K Hayes 1, P Ryan 1, D Byrnes 1.

Croke Park, Dublin
Referee: F Horgan (Tipperary)

== Statistics ==
=== Top scorers ===
Overall

Rank	Player	Club	Tally	Total	Matches	Average
1	Stephen Bennett	Waterford	1–54	57	5	11.40
2	Tony Kelly	Clare	1–53	56	4	14.00
3	Aaron Gillane	Limerick	2–44	50	5	10.00
4	Joe Canning	Galway	0–49	49	4	12.25
5	T. J. Reid	Kilkenny	3–34	43	3	14.33
5	Donal Burke	Dublin	1–40	43	3	14.33
6	Patrick Horgan	Cork	2–24	30	3	10.60
7	Jason Forde	Tipperary	1–22	25	3	8.33
8	Gearóid Hegarty	Limerick	0–20	20	5	4.00
9	Austin Gleeson	Waterford	0–17	17	5	3.40
9	Tom Morrissey	Limerick	0–17	17	5	3.40

In a single game

Rank	Player	Club	Tally	Total	Opposition
1	Donal Burke	Dublin	1–16	19	Laois
2	Tony Kelly	Clare	1–15	18	Wexford
3	T. J. Reid	Kilkenny	1–14	17	Waterford
3	Tony Kelly	Clare	0–17	17	Limerick
4	Joe Canning	Galway	0–14	14	Kilkenny
4	Joe Canning	Galway	0–14	14	Tipperary
5	Stephen Bennett	Waterford	1–10	13	Kilkenny
5	T. J. Reid	Kilkenny	1–10	13	Galway
5	T. J. Reid	Kilkenny	1–10	13	Dublin
5	Tony Kelly	Clare	0–13	13	Laois

== Miscellaneous ==
- Clare and Limerick qualified for the 2020 National Hurling League Division 1 final. The single match between Clare and Limerick played on 25 October 2020 was both the National Hurling League Final and the Munster Hurling Championship Quarter-final.
- Limerick retained the Munster Championship for the first time since 1981.
- It was the first Munster final between Limerick and Waterford since 2007.
- It was the first ever All-Ireland final between Limerick and Waterford.
- It was only the third All-Ireland final that ended goalless, the others being the 2004 All-Ireland Senior Hurling Championship Final and the 1999 All-Ireland Senior Hurling Championship Final.

== Live televised games ==
RTÉ, the national broadcaster in Ireland provided the majority of the live television coverage of the hurling championship in the fourth year of a five-year deal running from 2017 until 2021.Sky Sports also broadcast a number of matches and have exclusive rights to some games. Sky Sports televised all of its live Championship games as part of its basic package on Sky Sports Mix.

== Awards ==
Sunday Game Team of the Year

The Sunday Game team of the year was picked on 13 December the night of the final. The panel consisting of Donal Óg Cusack, Jackie Tyrell, Ursula Jacob, and Shane Dowling picked Gearóid Hegarty as the Sunday game player of the year.

1. Nickie Quaid (Limerick)
2. Sean Finn (Limerick)
3. Dan Morrissey (Limerick)
4. Daithi Burke (Galway)
5. Diarmuid Byrnes (Limerick)
6. Tadhg de Búrca (Waterford)
7. Kyle Hayes (Limerick)
8. Cian Lynch (Limerick)
9. Jamie Barron (Waterford)
10. Tom Morrissey (Limerick)
11. TJ Reid (Kilkenny)
12. Gearóid Hegarty (Limerick)
13. Stephen Bennett (Waterford)
14. Aaron Gillane (Limerick)
15. Tony Kelly (Clare)

All Star Team of the Year

In February 2021, the 2020 PwC All-Stars winners were presented at Dublin's Convention Centre. Gearóid Hegarty was named as the All Stars Hurler of the Year with Eoin Cody named the All Stars Young Hurler of the Year.

Pos.	Player	Team	Appearances
GK	Nickie Quaid	Limerick	1
RCB	Seán Finn	Limerick	3
FB	Dan Morrissey	Limerick	2
LCB	Daithí Burke	Galway	5
RWB	Diarmaid Byrnes	Limerick	1
CB	Tadhg de Búrca	Waterford	2
LWB	Kyle Hayes	Limerick	1
MD	Jamie Barron	Waterford	3
MD	Tony Kelly	Clare	2
RWF	Gearóid Hegarty^{HOTY}	Limerick	1
CF	Cian Lynch	Limerick	2
LWF	Tom Morrissey	Limerick	1
RCF	Aaron Gillane	Limerick	2
FF	T. J. Reid	Kilkenny	5
LCF	Stephen Bennett	Waterford	1

== See also ==
- 2020 Leinster Senior Hurling Championship
- 2020 Munster Senior Hurling Championship
- 2020 Joe McDonagh Cup (Tier 2)
- 2020 Christy Ring Cup (Tier 3)
- 2020 Nicky Rackard Cup (Tier 4)
- 2020 Lory Meagher Cup (Tier 5)
