= Dan Morrissey =

Irish hurler

Personal information
- Native name: Dónall Ó Muireasa (Irish)
- Born: 20 April 1993 (age 33) Castleconnell, County Limerick, Ireland
- Occupation: Tax accountant
- Height: 6 ft 1 in (185 cm)

Sport
- Sport: Hurling
- Position: Full-back
Club
- Years: Club
- Ahane
Club titles
- Limerick titles: 0
College
- Years: College
- 2011–2015: University of Limerick
College titles
- Fitzgibbon titles: 1
Inter-county*
Years	County	Apps (scores)
2014–present	Limerick	62 (0–02)
Inter-county titles
- Munster titles: 7
- All-Irelands: 6
- NHL: 3
- All Stars: 4
- *Inter County team apps and scores correct as of 22:35, 19 July 2026.

Daniel Morrissey (born 20 April 1993) is an Irish hurler who plays as a left wing-back for club side Ahane and at inter-county level with the Limerick senior hurling team.

== Early life ==
Morrissey was born in Castleconnell, County Limerick. His brother, Tom Morrissey, also plays for Ahane and the Limerick senior hurling team.

== Playing career ==
=== University ===
During his studies at the University of Limerick, Morrissey was selected for the college's senior hurling team. On 11 March 2015, he won a Fitzgibbon Cup medal as UL defeated the Waterford Institute of Technology by 2–18 to 1–14 in a replay of the final at Páirc Uí Rinn.

=== Club ===
Morrissey joined the Ahane club at a young age and played in all grades at juvenile and underage levels before joining the club's senior team.

=== Inter-county ===
==== Minor and under-21 ====
Morrissey first played for Limerick at minor level. He made his first appearance on 25 June 2010 in a 1–17 to 2–12 defeat by Clare in the Munster Championship. Morrissey was eligible for the minor grade again in 2011, however, his season ended with a 4–17 to 3–15 defeat by Waterford.

Morrissey subsequently joined the Limerick under-21 hurling team. He made his first appearance on 18 July 2012 in a 1–16 to 1–11 defeat by Tipperary. Morrissey's three successive seasons with the team ended without success.

==== Senior ====
Morrissey made his senior debut for Limerick on 23 February 2014, replacing Gavin O'Mahony for the final 12 minutes of a National Hurling League game against Antrim at the Gaelic Grounds. He was an unused substitute for the subsequent championship campaign.

On 12 March 2017, Morrissey scored his first point for Limerick in a 6–33 to 1–19 defeat of Laois in the National League.

Morrissey was named man of the match, beating Kilkenny's Eoin Murphy and his brother Tom, following Limerick's All-Ireland quarter-final defeat of Kilkenny on 15 July 2018.

On 19 August 2018, Morrissey was at left wing-back when Limerick won their first All-Ireland title in 45 years after a 3–16 to 2–18 defeat of Galway in the final. He ended the season by winning an All-Star Award.

On 31 March 2019, Morrissey was selected at left wing-back for Limerick's National League final meeting with Waterford at Croke Park. He collected a winners' medal following the 1–24 to 0–19 victory. On 30 June 2019, Morrissey won a Munster Championship medal at left wing-back following Limerick's 2–26 to 2–14 defeat of Tipperary in the final.

On 25 October 2020, Morrissey won a second successive National League medal after Limerick's 0–36 to 1–23 win over Clare in the delayed final. Later that season he claimed a second successive Munster Championship medal after lining out at full-back in the 0–25 to 0–21 Munster final defeat of Waterford.

Morrissey won an All Star in 2020, 2023 and 2024.

== Career statistics ==
As of match played 19 July 2026.

Team	Year	National League			Munster		All-Ireland		Total	
Team	Year	Division	Apps	Score	Apps	Score	Apps	Score	Apps	Score
Limerick	2014	Division 1B	2	0–00	0	0–00	0	0–00	2	0–00
Limerick	2015	Division 1B	6	0–00	1	0–00	2	0–00	9	0–00
Limerick	2016	Division 1B	4	0–00	1	0–00	1	0–00	6	0–00
Limerick	2017	Division 1B	1	0–01	1	0–00	1	0–00	3	0–01
Limerick	2018	Division 1B	7	0–00	4	0–02	4	0–00	15	0–00
Limerick	2019	Division 1A	7	0–01	5	0–00	1	0–00	13	0–01
Limerick	2020	Division 1A	4	0–00	3	0–00	2	0–00	9	0–00
Limerick	2021	Division 1A	3	0–00	2	0–00	2	0–00	7	0–00
	2022	Division 1A	5	0–00	5	0–01	2	0–01	12	0–02
	2023		6	0–00	5	0–00	2	0–00	14	0–00
	2024		3	0–00	5	0–00	1	0–00	9	0–00
	2025		2	0–00	5	0–00	1	0–00	8	0–00
	2026		3	0-00	4	0-00	2	0-00	9	0-00
Career total			53	0–02	41	0–01	21	0–01	115	0–04

== Honours ==
University of Limerick

- Fitzgibbon Cup (1): 2015

Limerick

- All-Ireland Senior Hurling Championship: 2018, 2020, 2021, 2022, 2023
- Munster Senior Hurling Championship: 2019, 2020, 2021, 2022, 2023
- National Hurling League Division 1: 2019, 2020, 2023

Individual

- All-Star Award (3): 2018, 2020, 2023, 2024
- The Sunday Game Team of the Year (2): 2020, 2023
