= Shane McNulty =

Irish hurler

Personal information
- Native name: Seán Mac an Ultaigh (Irish)
- Born: 28 June 1994 (age 32) Waterford, Ireland
- Height: 6 ft 0 in (183 cm)

Sport
- Sport: Hurling
- Position: Left corner-back
Club
- Years: Club
- De La Salle
Club titles
- Waterford titles: 1
College
- Years: College
- Waterford Institute of Technology
College titles
- Fitzgibbon titles: 0
Inter-county*
Years	County	Apps (scores)
2014-present	Waterford	11 (0-02)
Inter-county titles
- Munster titles: 0
- All-Irelands: 0
- NHL: 1
- All Stars: 0
- *Inter County team apps and scores correct as of 15:05, 29 November 2020.

Shane McNulty (born 28 June 1994) is an Irish hurler who plays for Waterford Senior Championship club De La Salle and at inter-county level with the Waterford senior hurling team. He usually lines out as a left corner-back.

== Playing career ==
=== CBS Tramore ===
McNulty first came to prominence as a hurler during his secondary schooling at Tramore CBS. He played in every grade of hurling with the school and enjoyed county championship success in the under-15 grade in March 2008 following a 3–11 to 2–06 defeat of Abbey Community School from Ferrybank.

=== De La Salle College ===
McNulty transferred from Tramore CBS to De La Salle College to finish his secondary schooling and immediately established himself on the college's senior hurling team. He lined out in several Harty Cup campaigns with the college.

=== Waterford Institute of Technology ===
McNulty completed a Business degree at the Waterford Institute of Technology between and joined the senior hurling team in his second year. He was a regular player in several Fitzgibbon Cup campaigns.

=== De La Salle ===
McNulty joined the De La Salle club at a young age and played in all grades at juvenile and underage levels. On 15 December 2013, he lined out at full-back when De La Salle faced St. Carthage's in the Waterford Under-21 Championship final. He ended the game with a winners' medal following the 3–13 to 1–04 victory.

McNulty assumed the captaincy of the De La Salle under-21 team in 2015, however, the championship was delayed for almost a year for a number of reasons. On 20 September 2016, he won a second Waterford Under-21 Championship medal following a 4–20 to 4–16 defeat of Dungarvan in the final.

McNulty made his first appearance for the De La Salle senior team during the 2012 Waterford Senior Championship. On 14 October, he came on as a 34th-minute substitute and scored 0-02 from play when De La Salle defeated Dungarvan by 1–21 to 0–12 to claim the Waterford Senior Championship.

=== Waterford ===
==== Minor and under-21 ====
McNulty first lined out for Waterford as a member of the minor team during the 2011 Munster Championship. He made his first appearance for the team on 27 April when he was introduced as a 48th-minute substitute in a 2–16 to 1–13 defeat of Tipperary. McNulty subsequently broke onto the starting fifteen and was selected at midfield when Waterford faced Clare in the Munster final on 10 July. He ended the game on the losing side following a 1–20 to 3–09 defeat.

McNulty was again eligible for the minor grade in 2012. He played his last game in the minor grade on 29 June when Waterford suffered a 2–25 to 0–12 defeat by Tipperary at the Munster semi-final stage.

On 18 July 2013, McNulty made his first appearance for the Waterford under-21 hurling team. He lined out at centre-back in a 2–15 to 0–17 defeat by Clare in the Munster Championship.

McNulty was again included on the Waterford under-21 team for 2014 Munster Championship. His only appearance that year was at left corner-back in Waterford's 3–18 to 0–16 defeat by Cork on 16 July.

For the third successive season, McNulty was selected for the under-21 team in 2015. He made his last appearance in the grade on 15 July when Waterford suffered a 0–23 to 1–18 defeat by Clare at the semi-final stage.

==== Senior ====
McNulty was added to the Waterford senior panel prior to the start of the 2014 National League. He made his first appearance for the team on 9 March 2014 when he lined out at midfield in a 1–13 to 1–10 defeat of Dublin. McNulty remained on the panel and was an unused substitute for the Munster Championship.

On 3 May 2015, McNulty was named amongst the substitutes for the National League final. He remained on the bench for the entire game but collected a winners' medal following the 1–24 to 0–17 defeat of Cork. On 12 July 2015, McNulty was an unused substitute when Waterford were beaten for the fourth time in six seasons by Tipperary in the Munster final.

On 1 May 2016, McNulty was on the bench when Waterford drew 0-22 apiece with Clare in the 2016 National League final. He was also a non-playing substitute for the replay, which Waterford lost by 1–23 to 2–19. On 10 July, McNulty was again a non-playing substitute for the 2016 Munster final, with Waterford eventually losing by 5–19 to 0–13.

McNulty made his championship debut on 8 July 2017 when he came on as a substitute for Noel Connors at right corner-back in a 4–23 to 2–22 defeat of Kilkenny. On 3 September, he was anon-playing substitute when Waterford suffered a 0–26 to 2–17 defeat by Galway in the All-Ireland final.

On 31 March 2019, McNulty was selected at right corner-back when Waterford faced Limerick in the National League final. He ended the game on the losing side following a 1–24 to 0–19 defeat.

== Career statistics ==
As of match played 28 November 2020.

Team	Year	National League			Munster		All-Ireland		Total	
Team	Year	Division	Apps	Score	Apps	Score	Apps	Score	Apps	Score
Waterford	2014	Division 1A	2	0-00	0	0-00	0	0-00	2	0-00
Waterford	2015	Division 1B	1	0-00	0	0-00	0	0-00	1	0-00
Waterford	2016	Division 1B	4	0-00	0	0-00	0	0-00	4	0-00
Waterford	2017	Division 1B	4	0-00	0	0-00	1	0-00	5	0-00
Waterford	2018	Division 1B	2	0-00	3	0-00	—		5	0-00
Waterford	2019	Division 1B	8	0-01	3	0-00	—		11	0-01
Waterford	2020	Division 1A	4	0-00	2	0-01	2	0-01	8	0-02
Career total			25	0-01	8	0-01	3	0-01	36	0-03

== Honours ==
De La Salle

- Waterford Senior Hurling Championship (1): 2012
- Waterford Under-21 Hurling Championship (2): 2013, 2015

Waterford

- National Hurling League (1): 2015
