= 2020 Munster Senior Hurling Championship final =

- Event: 2020 Munster Senior Hurling Championship
Limerick	Waterford
0–25	0–21
- Date: 15 November 2020
- Venue: Semple Stadium, Thurles
- Man of the Match: Cian Lynch
- Referee: Colm Lyons (Cork)
- Attendance: 0
- Weather: Dry

The 2020 Munster Senior Hurling Championship Final was a hurling match that was played on 1 November at Semple Stadium in Thurles. It was contested by defending champions Limerick and Waterford.

Limerick, captained by Declan Hannon, retained the title after a 0-25 to 0-21 win.

The same two teams went on to contest the 2020 All-Ireland SHC final on 13 December, with Limerick again winning by 0-30 to 0-19.

== Match ==
=== Details ===
15 November 2020 Final	Limerick	0–25 (25) – (21) 0–21	Waterford	Thurles
16:00				Venue: Semple Stadium
	Pts: A Gillane 10 (8f); G Mulcahy 4; P Casey 3; D Byrnes 2 (1 65), C Lynch 2, G Hegarty 2; S Flanagan 1, A Breen 1.	Report	Pts: Stephen Bennett 12 (8f, 1 65); A Gleeson 3; J Dillon 2; D Hutchinson 1, K Bennett 1, J Prendergast 1, P Curran 1.	Referee: C Lyons (Cork); Attendance: 0 TV: RTÉ
