= 2020 National Hurling League =

89th season of the National Hurling League

League details
- Dates: 25 January – 25 October 2020
- Teams: 35

League champions
- Winners: Limerick (13th win)
- Captain: Declan Hannon
- Manager: John Kiely

League runners-up
- Runners-up: Clare
- Captain: David McInerney
- Manager: Brian Lohan

Other division winners
- Division 2A: Antrim
- Division 2B: Down
- Division 3A: Donegal
- Division 3B: Sligo

The 2020 National Hurling League was the 89th season of the National Hurling League for county teams.

Division 1 was restructured in 2020 into two groups of approximately equal strength.

The league was originally scheduled to end on 29 March 2020. The public health measures introduced to combat the COVID-19 pandemic in Ireland resulted in most of the final stages being delayed to October and the Division 1 final stage being reduced from five games to one.

Eir Sport and RTÉ provide live TV coverage of the league on Saturday nights. TG4 broadcast Sunday afternoon games. The highlights programmes are RTÉ2's League Sunday on Sunday evenings, TG4's GAA 2020 on Monday evenings and Eir Sport's Allianz Leagues Reloaded on Wednesday evenings.

Limerick were the winners, defeating Clare in the final on 25 October.

== Format ==
League structure

Thirty-five teams compete in the 2020 NHL –

- twelve teams organised in two six-team groups of approximately equal strength in Division 1
- six teams in Divisions 2A, 2B and 3A
- five teams in Division 3B.

All thirty-two county teams from Ireland take part. London, Lancashire and Warwickshire complete the lineup.

Teams by Province and Division
Province	Div 1	Div 2A	Div 2B	Div 3A	Div 3B	Total
Connacht	1	1	1	0	2	5
Leinster	6	3	1	2	0	12
Munster	5	1	0	0	0	6
Ulster	0	1	2	4	2	9
Britain	0	0	2	0	1	3
Total	12	6	6	6	5	35

Each team plays all the other teams in their division once, either home or away. Two points are awarded for a win, and one for a draw.

The Division 1 semi-finals had been proposed to finish on the day the games are played avoiding the need for replays. If a semi-final is level after the initial seventy minutes, still level after two ten minute periods of extra time played each way, and still level after two further five minute periods of extra time, the outcome is to be decided by a free-taking competition. This is intended to prevent games from going to a replay and allow the league finals to be held on the scheduled date.

Tie-breaker

- If only two teams are level on league points, the team that won the head-to-head match is ranked ahead. If this game was a draw, score difference (total scored minus total conceded in all games) is used to rank the teams.
- If three or more teams are level on league points, score difference is used to rank the teams.

Finals, promotions and relegations

Division 1

- The top team in each group qualifies for the NHL final. (Originally, the group winner would have advanced to the semi-finals, and the second- and third placed team in each group qualify for the NHL quarter-finals)
- The bottom team in each group meet in a relegation play-off, with the losers being relegated to Division 2A

Division 2A

- The top two teams meet in Division 2A final, with the winners being promoted to Division 1
- The bottom team is relegated to Division 2B

Division 2B

- The top two teams meet in Division 2B final, with the winners being promoted to Division 2A
- The bottom two teams meet in a relegation play-off, with the losers being relegated to Division 3A

Division 3A

- The top two teams meet in Division 3A final, with the winners being promoted to Division 2B
- The bottom team is relegated to Division 3B

Division 3B

- The top two teams meet in Division 3B final, with the winners being promoted to Division 3A

== Division 1 ==
=== Division 1 Format ===
The top twelve teams compete in Division 1 in two six-team groups of approximately equal strength based on their league performance in 2019. This group structure was introduced in 2020. (Previously the top six ranked teams were in Division 1A and the teams ranked 7–12 were in Division 1B.)

Each team play all the other teams in their group once. Two points are awarded for a win and one for a draw. The top team in each group qualifies for the league final. The last-placed team in each group plays in the relegation playoff with the losers being relegated to Division 2A.

=== Division 1 Group A ===
==== Division 1 Group A Table ====
NHL final

Team	Pld	W	D	L	F	A	Diff	Pts
Limerick	5	5	0	0	5-107	3-88	25	10
Waterford	5	3	0	2	7-92	5-93	5	6
Galway	5	3	0	2	6-93	5-75	21	6
Cork	5	2	0	3	11-90	5-110	-2	4
Tipperary	5	2	0	3	7-107	9-91	10	4
Westmeath	5	0	0	5	2-72	11-105	-59	0

==== Division 1 Group A Rounds 1 to 5 ====
===== Division 1 Group A Round 1 =====
25 January 2020; 5:15 pm Round 1	Tipperary	0-18 - 2-14	Limerick	Semple Stadium, Thurles; Attendance: 11,867; Referee: P Murphy (Carlow)
25 January 2020; 5:15 pm Round 1	J Forde 0-10 (0-8f, 0-1 sideline), J Morris 0-3, J McGrath 0-3, P Cadell 0-1, W Connors 0-1.	Report	A Gillane 1-6 (0-4f, 0-1 sideline), D Dempsey 0-3, G Hegarty 1-0, T Morrissey 0-2, D Byrnes 0-2 (0-1ff), S Flanagan 0-1.	Semple Stadium, Thurles; Attendance: 11,867; Referee: P Murphy (Carlow)

26 January 2020; 12:30 pm Round 1	Galway	1-24 - 0-10	Westmeath	Pearse Stadium, Galway; Referee: J Murphy (Limerick)
26 January 2020; 12:30 pm Round 1	J Canning (0-12, 0-09f, 0-01 '65), T Haran (0-06); C Whelan (1-00), C Mannion (0-03); S Linnane (0-01), T Monaghan (0-01), S Bleahane (0-01).	Report	K Doyle (0-07, 0-07f), E Price (0-02, 0-01f), C Boyle (0-01).	Pearse Stadium, Galway; Referee: J Murphy (Limerick)

26 January 2020; 2:00 pm Round 1	Waterford	1-24 - 3-17	Cork	Walsh Park, Waterford; Referee: J Keenan (Wicklow)
26 January 2020; 2:00 pm Round 1	S Bennett 0-11 (0-7f, 0-1 ’65), P Curran 1-3, K Bennett 0-5 (0-1 sideline), J Fagan 0-2 (0-1 sideline), I Daly, J Prendergast, M Kearney 0-1 each.	Report	S Kingston 2-2, P Horgan 0-6 (0-6f), C Lehane 1-0, D Cahalane 0-3, S Harnedy, D Fitzgibbon, M Coleman 0-2 each_	Walsh Park, Waterford; Referee: J Keenan (Wicklow)

===== Division 1 Group A Round 2 =====
1 February 2020; 7:00 pm Round 2	Cork	2-24 - 1-25	Tipperary	Páirc Uí Chaoimh; Attendance: 9,821; Referee: J Owens (Wexford)
1 February 2020; 7:00 pm Round 2	P Horgan 1-9 (pen, 0-8f), R O'Flynn 1-3, A Cadogan 0-4, S Harnedy, D Fitzgibbon 0-2 each, D Cahalane, A Walsh, L Meade, M Coleman 0-1 each.	Report	B Hogan 1-0 (pen), M Kehoe, J McGrath, J Forde (3f) 0-4 each, P Maher 0-3, P Cadell, J Morris 0-2 each, J Cahill, R Maher (f), N O'Meara, A Flynn 0-1 each.	Páirc Uí Chaoimh; Attendance: 9,821; Referee: J Owens (Wexford)

2 February 2020; 2:00 pm Round 2	Limerick	1-19 - 0-14	Galway	LIT Gaelic Grounds, Limerick; Attendance: 14,151; Referee: C Lyons (Cork)
2 February 2020; 2:00 pm Round 2	D Reidy 0-7 (0-4f), D Dempsey 1-1, G Hegarty, T Morrissey, A Gillane (0-1f) 0-2 each, D O’Connell, D Hannon, S Flanagan, G Mulcahy, W O’Donoghue 0-1 each.	Report	J Canning 0-7 (0-5f), C Whelan 0-2, S Bleahane, S Cooney, A Harte, C Cooney (0-1f), C Mannion 0-1 each.	LIT Gaelic Grounds, Limerick; Attendance: 14,151; Referee: C Lyons (Cork)

2 February 2020; 2:00 pm Round 2	Westmeath	1-15 - 3-18	Waterford	TEG Cusack Park, Mullingar; Referee: S Stack (Dublin)
2 February 2020; 2:00 pm Round 2	N Mitchell 1-6 (5fs), C Doyle 0-4, A Devine 0-2, E Price, D Clinton and S McGovern 0-1 each.	Report	S Bennett 2-8 (4fs, 4 65s), J Fagan 1-0, D Lyons and P Curran 0-2 each, J Dillon, B Nolan, P Mahony, M Kearney, I Daly and D Hutchinson 0-1 each.	TEG Cusack Park, Mullingar; Referee: S Stack (Dublin)

===== Division 1 Group A Round 3 =====
7 March 2020; 5:30 pm Round 3	Limerick	1-21 - 1-17	Waterford	LIT Gaelic Grounds, Limerick; Attendance: 9,097; Referee: P O'Dwyer (Carlow)
7 March 2020; 5:30 pm Round 3	G Hegarty 1-5, A Gillane 0-7 (5 frees), G Mulcahy 0-4, D Dempsey 0-2, P O'Loughlin, D Reiby, R Hanley 0-1 each.		P Mahony 0-7 (6 frees), J Fagan 1-0, S Bennett 0-3 (1 free), J Barron 0-2, C Lyons, P Hogan, I Daly, B Power, D Lyons (0-1 each).	LIT Gaelic Grounds, Limerick; Attendance: 9,097; Referee: P O'Dwyer (Carlow)

8 March 2020; 2:00 pm Round 3	Galway	3-21 - 3-13	Tipperary	Pearse Stadium, Galway; Referee: J Murphy (Limerick)
8 March 2020; 2:00 pm Round 3	E Niland 0-14 (13f), C Whelan 2-0, B Concannon 0-4, C Mannion 1-0, C Cooney, J Coen, J Flynn (1 sl) 0-1 each.	Report	J Forde 1-5 (2 65, 2f), J McGrath 2-1, C Darcy 0-2, P Maher, R Maher, D Quirke, M Breen, S Callanan 0-1 each.	Pearse Stadium, Galway; Referee: J Murphy (Limerick)

16 February 2020; 2:00 pm Round 3	Westmeath	1-14 - 3-12	Cork	TEG Cusack Park, Mullingar; Referee: L Gordon (Galway)
16 February 2020; 2:00 pm Round 3	A Devine 1-8 (7f, 1-0 “65”), D McNicholas 0-2, D Clinton 0-2, J Boyle 0-1, A Clarke 0-1.	Report	P Horgan 2-8 (7f, 2-0 “pens”, 1 “65”), B Cooper 1-0, C Lehane 0-2, T O’Mahony 0-1 (1 S/L), L Meade 0-1.	TEG Cusack Park, Mullingar; Referee: L Gordon (Galway)

===== Division 1 Group A Round 4 =====
23 February 2020; 2:00 pm Round 4	Cork	2-21 - 0-29	Limerick	Páirc Uí Chaoimh; Attendance: 11,212; Referee: S Cleere (Kilkenny)
23 February 2020; 2:00 pm Round 4	P Horgan 0-17 (0-15f, 0-1 65), S Kingston 1-1, A Walsh 1-0, D Dalton 0-02 (0-1 sideline), B Cooper 0-1.		A Gillane 0-13 (0-11f), D O'Donovan 0-3, C Lynch, S Flanagan, P O'Loughlin, K Hayes (0-2 each), W O'Donoghue, D Dempsey D Byrnes (65), T Morrissey, G Hegarty 0-1 each.	Páirc Uí Chaoimh; Attendance: 11,212; Referee: S Cleere (Kilkenny)

23 February 2020; 2:00 pm Round 4	Waterford	0-17 - 0-16	Galway	Walsh Park; Attendance: 3,652; Referee: J Owens (Wexford)
23 February 2020; 2:00 pm Round 4	P Mahony 0-8 (5fs, 1 65), J Fagan 0-2, C Lyons, A Gleeson (f) K Moran, J Barron, S Bennett, P Curran, P Hogan 0-1 each.	Report	C Whelan 0-4, T Haran (3fs) C Mannion 0-3 each, E Niland (2fs), B Concannon 0-2 each, S Loftus, S Bleahane 0-1 each.	Walsh Park; Attendance: 3,652; Referee: J Owens (Wexford)

23 February 2020; 2:00 pm Round 4	Tipperary	3-27 - 0-16	Westmeath	Semple Stadium; Referee: P Murphy (Carlow)
23 February 2020; 2:00 pm Round 4	J Forde 0-14 (0-9f, 0-1sl), J Morris 1-3, C Darcy 1-1, S Callanan 1-1, R Maher 0-3, A Flynn 0-2, M Breen 0-2, M Kehoe 0-1.	Report	K Doyle 0-7 (0-6f, 0-1 65), A Devine 0-5 (0-5f), D McNicholas 0-2, A Clarke 0-1, C Doyle 0-1.	Semple Stadium; Referee: P Murphy (Carlow)

===== Division 1 Group A Round 5 =====
1 March 2020; 2:00 pm Round 5	Limerick	1-24 - 0-18	Westmeath	LIT Gaelic Grounds, Limerick; Referee: S HYnes (Galway)
1 March 2020; 2:00 pm Round 5	D Reidy 0-8 (0-7f), T Morrissey 0-7 (0-4f), S Flanagan 0-4, D Dempsey 1-0, B Ryan 0-2, B Nash 0-2, D O’Connell 0-1.	Report	D McNicholas 0-10 (0-8f, 0-2sl), D Clinton 0-3, J Galvin 0-2, J Coll 0-2, S Clavin 0-1.	LIT Gaelic Grounds, Limerick; Referee: S HYnes (Galway)

1 March 2020; 2:00 pm Round 5	Galway	2-18 - 1-16	Cork	Pearse Stadium; Referee: F Horgan (Tipperary)
1 March 2020; 2:00 pm Round 5	B Concannon (1-2); J Flynn (1-1); C Mannion (0-5, 0-3 frees); C Cooney (0-3, 0-2 frees); E Niland (0-2 frees), N Burke (0-2 each); A Tuohey, A Harte, D Burke (0-1 each).	Report	P Horgan (0-9, 0-9 frees); T O'Mahony (1-1, 0-1 sc); S Kingston (0-2); D Fitzgibbon, C Lehane, B Cooper, A Walsh (0-1 each).	Pearse Stadium; Referee: F Horgan (Tipperary)

1 March 2020; 2:00 pm Round 5	Tipperary	0-24 - 2-16	Waterford	Semple Stadium; Referee: S Stack (Dublin)
1 March 2020; 2:00 pm Round 5	J Forde 0-11 (5 65s, 4fs), D Quirke 0-4, S Callanan, P Maher 0-2 each, J McGrath, C Barrett, N McGrath, N O'Meara, C Darcy all 0-1 each	Report	P Mahony 0-7 (6fs), P Hogan 1-2, S Bennett 1-1, J Barron 0-2, K Moran, D Hutchinson, N Montgomery, C Gleeson all 0-1 each	Semple Stadium; Referee: S Stack (Dublin)

=== Division 1 Group B ===
==== Division 1 Group B Table ====
NHL final Relegated

Team	Pld	W	D	L	F	A	Diff	Pts
Clare	5	4	1	0	4-102	2-72	36	9
Wexford	5	4	0	1	7-101	4-77	33	8
Kilkenny	5	3	1	1	11-97	5-75	40	7
Dublin	5	2	0	3	5-89	7-88	-5	4
Laois	5	1	0	4	5-76	9-98	-34	2
Carlow	5	0	0	5	1-57	6-112	-68	0

==== Division 1 Group B Rounds 1 to 5 ====
===== Division 1 Group B Round 1 =====
25 January 2020; 7:00 pm Round 1	Laois	2-16 - 2-27	Wexford	MW Hire O'Moore Park, Portlaoise; Referee: F Horgan (Tipperary)
25 January 2020; 7:00 pm Round 1	R King 0-11 (7f), E Rowland 1-1 (f), W Dunphy 1-0, J Kelly, A Bergin, J Keyes, E Gaughan 0-1 each	Report	J O'Connor 0-6f, C McDonald 1-3, P Morris 0-4, R O'Connor, P Foley (fs) 0-3 each, A Nolan 1-0, K Foley, L Óg McGovern, C Dunbar 0-2 each, S Murphy, S Casey (f) 0-1 each.	MW Hire O'Moore Park, Portlaoise; Referee: F Horgan (Tipperary)

26 January 2020; 2:00 pm Round 1	Clare	1-27 - 0-14	Carlow	Cusack Park, Ennis; Referee: L Gordon (Galway)
26 January 2020; 2:00 pm Round 1	T Kelly (0-12, 6f), S O’Donnell (1-2), J Conlon (0-3,1f), D Fitzgerald (0-2), A McCarthy (0-2), D McInerney (0-1), P O’Connor (0-1), I Galvin (0-1), D Reidy (0-1), R Taylor (0-1), D McMahon (0-1).	Report	M Kavanagh (0-8, 7f), C Nolan (0-3, 1f), John Michael Nolan (0-2), R Coady (0-1).	Cusack Park, Ennis; Referee: L Gordon (Galway)

26 January 2020; 2:00 pm Round 1	Kilkenny	3-21 - 0-18	Dublin	UPMC Nowlan Park, Kilkenny; Attendance: 5,605; Referee: P O'Dwyer (Carlow)
26 January 2020; 2:00 pm Round 1	A Murphy 0-8 (0-6 frees, 0-1 65), B Ryan 2-0, G Aylward 1-0, P Deegan 0-2, C Fogarty 0-2, N Brassil 0-2, W Walsh 0-2, M Keoghan 0-1, B Sheehan 0-1, M Carey 0-1, J Donnelly 0-1, L Scanlon 0-1.	Report	O O’Rorke 0-6 (0-4 frees), S Moran 0-4 (0-3 frees), R Hayes 0-2 (0-1 free), E Dillon 0-2, C Crummey 0-1, R McBride 0-1, T Connolly 0-1, D Sutcliffe 0-1.	UPMC Nowlan Park, Kilkenny; Attendance: 5,605; Referee: P O'Dwyer (Carlow)

===== Division 1 Group B Round 2 =====
2 February 2020; 2:00 pm Round 2	Dublin	4-18 - 2-17	Laois	Parnell Park; Referee: D Hughes (Carlow)
2 February 2020; 2:00 pm Round 2	O O'Rorke 1-7 (0-6 frees, 0-1 '65), D Keogh 1-2, S Moran 0-3 (0-2 frees), E Dillon and R Hayes 1-0 each, D Burke and J Hetherton 0-2 each, J Malone and R McBride 0-1 each.		W Dunphy 2-1, R King 0-6 (0-5 frees), S Bergin 0-3, C McEvoy 0-2, A Dunphy, J Kelly, E Rowland (free), P Purcell and J Ryan 0-1 each.	Parnell Park; Referee: D Hughes (Carlow)

2 February 2020; 2:00 pm Round 2	Wexford	0-15 - 0-18	Clare	Chadwick's Wexford Park; Referee: S Cleere (Kilkenny)
2 February 2020; 2:00 pm Round 2	J O’Connor 0-4 (3 frees), P Foley 0-3 (3 frees), R O’Connor, C McDonald (0-2 each), A Rochford, M Fanning, P Morris, L Óg McGovern 0-1 each.	Report	T Kelly 0-12 (10 frees), D Fitzgerald 0-3, R Taylor 0-2, S O’Donnell 0-1.	Chadwick's Wexford Park; Referee: S Cleere (Kilkenny)

2 February 2020; 2:00 pm Round 2	Carlow	0-09 - 3-21	Kilkenny	Netwatch Cullen Park; Referee: C McAllister (Cork)
2 February 2020; 2:00 pm Round 2	M Kavanagh (0-6, five frees); C Nolan, T Joyce, E Byrne (0-1 each).		A Murphy (0-8, frees); R Hogan (1-3); J Maher (1-2); G Aylward (1-1); W Walsh, N Brassil (0-2 each); E Murphy (0-1, free); A Nolan, B Sheehan (0-1 each).	Netwatch Cullen Park; Referee: C McAllister (Cork)

===== Division 1 Group B Round 3 =====
15 February 2020; 5:00 pm Round 3	Carlow	0-09 - 0-20	Dublin	Netwatch Cullen Park; Referee: T Walsh (Waterford)
15 February 2020; 5:00 pm Round 3	M Kavanagh 0-6 (4f), JM Nolan 0-2, D English 0-1 (1f).	Report	P Ryan 0-5 (3f, 1 “65”), R McBride 0-4, O O’Rorke 0-3 (3f), S Moran 0-2 (1f), D Keogh 0-2, D Gray 0-2, C Crummey 0-2.	Netwatch Cullen Park; Referee: T Walsh (Waterford)

16 February 2020; 2:00 pm Round 3	Clare	0-17 - 0-09	Laois	Cusack Park, Ennis; Referee: J Keenan (Wicklow)
16 February 2020; 2:00 pm Round 3	T Kelly 0-8 (four frees), A Shanagher 0-3, I Galvin 0-1, A McCarthy 0-1, J Browne 0-1, D McMahon 0-1, D Reidy 0-1, A Cunningham 0-1.	Report	R King 0-4 (four frees), W Dunphy 0-3 (one free), P Purcell 0-1, A Dunphy 0-1.	Cusack Park, Ennis; Referee: J Keenan (Wicklow)

16 February 2020; 2:00 pm Round 3	Wexford	1-16 - 1-14	Kilkenny	Chadwick's Wexford Park; Referee: F Horgan (Tipperary)
16 February 2020; 2:00 pm Round 3	P Morris 0-7 (6 frees), C McDonald 1-1, J O’Connor 0-3, A Nolan 0-2, D Reck, P Foley (free), D O’Keeffe 0-1 each.	Report	A Murphy 0-4 (4 frees), R Hogan 0-3, B Ryan 1-0, J Donnelly 0-2, J Maher, W Walsh, D Brennan (free), M Keoghan, P Deegan 0-1 each.	Chadwick's Wexford Park; Referee: F Horgan (Tipperary)

===== Division 1 Group B Round 4 =====
22 February 2020; 5:00 pm Round 4	Dublin	0-18 - 2-14	Wexford	Croke Park; Attendance: 26,153; Referee: J Murphy (Limerick)
22 February 2020; 5:00 pm Round 4	P Ryan 0-8 (8fs), R McBride and R Hayes (1f) 0-2 each, E Dillon, C Boland, J Madden, C Crummey, D Burke, and O O'Rorke (f) 0-1 each.	Report	P Morris 0-7 (4fs, 165) R O'Connor 0-4 (1f), J O’Connor and M Fanning (pen) 1-0 each P Foley, D O'Keeffe and L Chin (f) 0-1 each.	Croke Park; Attendance: 26,153; Referee: J Murphy (Limerick)

22 February 2020; 7:00 pm Round 4	Laois	0-15 - 0-14	Carlow	MW Hire O'Moore Park; Referee: C McAllister (Cork)
22 February 2020; 7:00 pm Round 4	R King 0-12 (9f), C McEvoy, W Dunphy, A Dunphy 0-1 each.	Report	M Kavanagh 0-11 (8f), C Nolan 0-2, J Nolan 0-1.	MW Hire O'Moore Park; Referee: C McAllister (Cork)

23 February 2020; 2:00 pm Round 4	Kilkenny	1-19 - 3-13	Clare	UPMC Nowlan Park; Referee: L Gordon (Galway)
23 February 2020; 2:00 pm Round 4	A Murphy (0-7, frees); G Aylward (1-1); A Mullen, J Donnelly, W Walsh (0-2 each); D Mullen, R Leahy, B Ryan, R Hogan, E Cody (0-1 each).	Report	S O’Donnell (2-1); T Kelly (0-7, four frees); R Taylor (1-0); D Reidy, J Conlon, C Guilfoyle, D Ryan, A Cunningham (0-1 each).	UPMC Nowlan Park; Referee: L Gordon (Galway)

===== Division 1 Group B Round 5 =====
1 March 2020; 2:00 pm Round 5	Wexford	2-29 - 1-11	Carlow	Chadwick's Wexford Park; Referee: C Cunning (Antrim)
1 March 2020; 2:00 pm Round 5	R O’Connor (1-4 frees) 1-6, D O’Keeffe 1-2, P Morris (4f) 0-8, J O’Connor 0-3, C Flood, A Nolan, H Kehoe 0-2 each, S Donohoe, M Dwyer, C McDonald, C Dunbar 0-1 each.	Report	D Byrne 1-1, C Nolan (6f) 0-8, T Joyce, M Kavanagh 0-1 each.	Chadwick's Wexford Park; Referee: C Cunning (Antrim)

1 March 2020; 2:00 pm Round 5	Clare	0-27 - 1-15	Dublin	Cusack Park, Ennis; Attendance: 3,360; Referee: D Hughes (Carlow)
1 March 2020; 2:00 pm Round 5	T Kelly 0-12 (10f, 0-1 '65), D McInerney 0-4, D McMahon 0-2, D Ryan 0-1, S O'Donnell 0-3, J Conlon 0-1, D Reidy 0-2, A Shanagher 0-1, G Cooney 0-1	Report	D Burke 0-10 (6f), E Dillon 1-0, P Crummey 0-3, D Gray 0-1, R Hayes 0-1	Cusack Park, Ennis; Attendance: 3,360; Referee: D Hughes (Carlow)

1 March 2020; 2:00 pm Round 5	Kilkenny	3-22 - 1-19	Laois	UMPC Nowlan Park
1 March 2020; 2:00 pm Round 5	E Cody 1-8 (1-0 penalty, 0-4 frees, 0-2 65s), A Murphy 1-5 0-3 frees, 0-1 65), B Ryan 1-1, J Maher, M Keoghan 0-2 each, R Leahy, G Aylward and J Bergin 0-1 each. D Brennan 0-1 free.	Report	R King 0-8 (0-4 frees, 0-2 65s), P Purcell and W Dunphy 0-3 each, E Rowland 1-0 (penalty), E Gaughan 0-2, J Lennon, A Dunphy and J Ryan 0-1 each.	UMPC Nowlan Park

=== Division 1 Final ===
This game was also the 2020 Munster quarter-final.

25 October 2020 NHL Final	Clare	1-23 (26) – (36) 0-36	Limerick	Thurles
15:45 GMT (UTC±0)		(HT: 0-15 – 0-15)		Venue: Semple Stadium
	Gls: Ryan Taylor 1 Pts: Tony Kelly 17 (9f), Cathal Malone 2, Diarmuid Ryan 2, Stephen O’Halloran 1, Ryan Taylor 1	Report	Pts: Aaron Gillane 12 (9f, 1 ’65), Gearoid Hegarty 5, Tom Morrissey 4, Peter Casey 3, Kyle Hayes 3, Diarmaid Byrnes 3, Graeme Mulcahy 2, Cian Lynch 1, Declan Hannon 1, Seamus Flanagan 1, Pat Ryan 1	Referee: Fergal Horgan (Tipperary); Attendance: 0 TV: RTÉ 2

=== Division 1 relegation play-off ===
The bottom teams in the two Division 1 groups meet in a play-off with the losers being relegated to Division 2A.

8 March 2020; 2:00 pm Play-off	Westmeath	1-17 - 2-08	Carlow	TEG Cusack Park, Mullingar; Referee: S Cleere (Kilkenny)
8 March 2020; 2:00 pm Play-off	K Doyle (1-14, 0-10 frees, 0-1 sideline ball, 0-1 ’65), D McNicholas (0-1), S Clavin (0-1), D Clinton (0-1).	Report	M Kavanagh (1-3, 1 penalty, 0-3 frees), D Byrne (1-1), C Nolan (0-3, 2 frees), J Kavanagh 0-1.	TEG Cusack Park, Mullingar; Referee: S Cleere (Kilkenny)

=== Division 1 scoring statistics ===
Top scorers overall

Rank	Player	Team	Tally	Total	Matches	Average
1	Tony Kelly	Clare	0-68	68	6	11.33
2	Patrick Horgan	Cork	3-49	58	5	11.60
3	Jason Forde	Tipperary	1-44	47	5	9.40
4	Aaron Gillane	Limerick	1-40	43	5	8.60
5	Ross King	Laois	0-41	41	5	8.20
6	Marty Kavanagh	Carlow	1-35	38	6	6.33
7	Stephen Bennett	Waterford	3-24	33	5	6.60
8	Alan Murphy	Kilkenny	1-32	35	5	7.00
9	Killian Doyle	Westmeath	1-28	31	4	7.75
10	Paul Morris	Wexford	0-27	27	5	5.40

Top scorers in a single game

Rank	Player	Team	Tally	Total	Opposition
1	Killian Doyle	Westmeath	1-14	17	Carlow
1	Tony Kelly	Clare	0-17	17	Limerick (final)
1	Patrick Horgan	Cork	0-17	17	Limerick
4	Patrick Horgan	Cork	2-08	14	Westmeath
4	Stephen Bennett	Waterford	2-08	14	Westmeath
4	Jason Forde	Tipperary	0-14	14	Westmeath
4	Evan Niland	Galway	0-14	14	Tipperary
8	Aaron Gillane	Limerick	0-13	13	Cork
9	Patrick Horgan	Cork	1-09	12	Tipperary
9	Ross King	Laois	0-12	12	Carlow
9	Joe Canning	Galway	0-12	12	Westmeath
9	Tony Kelly	Clare	0-12	12	Carlow
9	Tony Kelly	Clare	0-12	12	Wexford
9	Tony Kelly	Clare	0-12	12	Dublin
9	Aaron Gillane	Limerick	0-12	12	Clare (final)

== Division 2A ==
=== Division 2A Table ===
Division final, winner promoted Automatic relegation to Division 2B

Team	Pld	W	D	L	F	A	Diff	Pts
Antrim (P)	5	4	1	0	13-100	3-67	+63	9
Kerry	5	4	0	1	7-82	3-67	+27	8
Offaly	5	3	1	1	9-118	8-73	+48	7
Meath	5	2	0	3	5-86	8-102	-25	4
Wicklow	5	1	0	4	7-71	8-107	-39	2
Mayo	5	0	0	5	2-64	13-105	-74	0

=== Division 2A Rounds 1 to 5 ===
==== Division 2A Round 1 ====
25 January 2020; 2:00pm Round 1	Mayo	0-13 - 2-24	Kerry	Elverys MacHale Park, Castlebar; Referee: C Cunning (Antrim)
25 January 2020; 2:00pm Round 1	S Boland (0-11, 10fs), S Crinnigan (0-1), G Kelly (0-1, 1f).	Report	S Conway (0-11, 7fs), B Barrett (1-4), J Conway (1-3), S Nolan (0-4), F Mackessy (0-1); C Harty (0-1),	Elverys MacHale Park, Castlebar; Referee: C Cunning (Antrim)

26 January 2020; 2:00pm Round 1	Wicklow	0-11 - 0-20	Antrim	Aughrim County Ground, Aughrim; Referee: C Mooney
26 January 2020; 2:00pm Round 1	E Donohue (0-3f), A O'Brien (0-2; 0-1f; 0-1 65'), E Kearns (0-2), J Doyle (0-2), D Staunton (0-1), P Doyle (0-1).	Report	N McManus (0-11; 0-10f), D McCloskey (0-2), G Walsh (0-2), C Johnston (0-1), E O'Neill (0-1), J McNaughton (0-1), M Bradley (0-1), N McKenna (0-1).	Aughrim County Ground, Aughrim; Referee: C Mooney

26 January 2020; 2:00pm Round 1	Offaly	0-26 - 1-21	Meath	St. Patrick's Park, Birr; Referee: M Murtagh (Westmeath)
26 January 2020; 2:00pm Round 1	L Langton 0-12 (7f, 1 '65); S Kinsella, T Geraghty 0-3 each; S Cleary, D Nally, E Cahill (2f) 0-2 each; L Fox (f), O Kelly 0-1 each.	Report	P O'Hanrahan 1-11 (9f, 1 '65); A Douglas, J Regan (f) 0-3 each; J Toher (f), S Geraghty, D Kelly, E O'Donnchadh 0-1 each.	St. Patrick's Park, Birr; Referee: M Murtagh (Westmeath)

==== Division 2A Round 2 ====
2 February 2020; 12:30 pm Round 2	Meath	2-25 - 3-18	Wicklow	Páirc Tailteann, Navan; Referee: S Hynes
2 February 2020; 12:30 pm Round 2	P O'Hanrahan 0-16 (0-12 fs, 0-1 65), J Regan 1-3 (1-0 pen), E O Donnchadha 1-1, J Toher 0-1, D Healy 0-1, P Slevin 0-1, A Healy 0-1		A O'Brien 1-9 (0-7 fs, 0-1 65), E McCormack 1-2, P Doyle 1-2, J Doyle 0-2, P Keane 0-1, D Staunton 0-1, C McNally 0-1	Páirc Tailteann, Navan; Referee: S Hynes

2 February 2020; 2:00 pm Round 2	Kerry	2-11 - 0-14	Offaly	Austin Stack Park, Tralee; Referee: N Wall (Cork)
2 February 2020; 2:00 pm Round 2	S Conway (0-5); J Conway (1-1), C Harty (1-0), M Slattery (0-2), B Barrett (0-2), S Nolan (0-1).		E Cahill (0-8), S Cleary (0-2), L Langton (0-2), C Kiely (0-1), B Duignan (0-1).	Austin Stack Park, Tralee; Referee: N Wall (Cork)

2 February 2020; 2:00 pm Round 2	Antrim	4-19 - 0-07	Mayo	Fr. Healy Park, Loughguile; Referee: G McGrath
2 February 2020; 2:00 pm Round 2	A Delargy (2-0), N McKenna (1-3); N McManus (0-6), D McCloskey (1-2), E Campbell (0-4), C Boyd (0-1); G Walsh (0-1), J McNaughton (0-1), C McCann (0-1).		S Boland (0-3), S Kenny (0-2), G Kelly (0-1); E Delaney (0-1).	Fr. Healy Park, Loughguile; Referee: G McGrath

==== Division 2A Round 3 ====
15 February 2020; 2:00 pm Round 3	Meath	0-08 - 0-13	Kerry	St. Loman's Park, Trim; Referee: D Cunning (Antrim)
15 February 2020; 2:00 pm Round 3	P O'Hanrahan 0-5 (4f); J Regan, E O Donnchadha, J Kelly 0-1 each.	Report	S Conway 0-7 (4f, 2 '65); P Boyle, J Conway 0-2 each; B Barrett, M Leane 0-1 each.	St. Loman's Park, Trim; Referee: D Cunning (Antrim)

16 February 2020; 1:00 pm Round 3	Mayo	1-13 - 1-16	Wicklow	Connacht Centre of Excellence, Bekan; Referee: M Murtagh (Westmeath)
16 February 2020; 1:00 pm Round 3	S Boland 0-6 (6f); C Freeman 1-2 (1-0 pen); S Kenny 0-3 (2f); E Delaney 0-2.	Report	A O'Brien 0-12 (10f, 1 '65); E O'Donoghue 1-0; J Doyle, W Kavanagh, E McCormick, D Stanton 0-1 each.	Connacht Centre of Excellence, Bekan; Referee: M Murtagh (Westmeath)

8 March 2020; 2:00 pm Round 3	Offaly	0-20 - 2-14	Antrim	Bord na Móna O'Connor Park, Tullamore; Referee: D Hughes (Carlow)
8 March 2020; 2:00 pm Round 3	E Cahill 0-11 (7f, 0-1 s/cut), P Geraghty 0-3 (0-1 s/cut), D Nally 0-3, B Watkins 0-1, S Cleary 0-1, B Murphy 0-1	Report	N McManus 1-13 (10f, 0-1 65), D Nugent 1-0, C Johnson 0-1.	Bord na Móna O'Connor Park, Tullamore; Referee: D Hughes (Carlow)

==== Division 2A Round 4 ====
22 February 2020; 2:00 pm Round 4	Wicklow	1-12 - 1-20	Kerry	Pearse Park, Arklow; Referee: C Mooney (Dublin)
22 February 2020; 2:00 pm Round 4	A O'Brien 0-9 (5f, 3' 65s); P Doyle 1-0; E Donohoe 0-2 (1f); D Staunton O-1.	Report	S Conway 0-12 (10f, 1' 65); Jason Diggins 1-0; B Barrett, M Slattery, D Goggin 0-2 each; M O'Leary, F O Sullivan 0-1 each.	Pearse Park, Arklow; Referee: C Mooney (Dublin)

23 February 2020; 12:30 pm Round 4	Antrim	5-27 - 1-15	Meath	Portglenone; Referee: S Stack
23 February 2020; 12:30 pm Round 4	N McManus 2-9 (2f, 2 '65s); K Molloy, E Campbell, J McNaughton 1-2 each; D Nugent, N McKenna, A O'Brien, R Molloy 0-2 each; G Walsh, J Maskey, M Bradley, N McKeague 0-1 each.	Report	P O'Hanrahan 0-9 (6f); N Potterson 1-1; J Toher 0-2; A Douglas, S Morris, J Kelly 0-1 each.	Portglenone; Referee: S Stack

23 February 2020; 2:00 pm Round 4	Mayo	1-13 - 5-29	Offaly	Connacht Centre of Excellence, Bekan; Referee: N Wall (Cork)
23 February 2020; 2:00 pm Round 4	S Boland 0-6 (4f); B Morley 1-0; S Kenny 0-4 (f); S Mulroy, D Huane, C Freeman 0-1 each.	Report	E Cahill 0-12 (6f); D Nally 3-2; O Kelly 1-1; L Fox (1f), L Langton 0-4 each; D King 1-0, S Cleary, B Murphy 0-2 each; J Sampson, C Kiely (f) 0-1 each.	Connacht Centre of Excellence, Bekan; Referee: N Wall (Cork)

==== Division 2A Round 5 ====
1 March 2020; 12:30 pm Round 5	Offaly	4-29 - 2-14	Wicklow	Bord na Móna O'Connor Park, Tullamore; Referee: A Kelly (Galway)
1 March 2020; 12:30 pm Round 5	E Cahill 0-17 (0-13 frees), T Geraghty, P Geraghty and C Gath 1-1 each, D Nally 0-4, J Sampson 1-0, L Fox 0-2, D Doughan, B Murphy and P Kinsella 0-1 each.	Report	A O’Brien 1-9 (0-6 frees), E McCormack 1-0, M Boland 0-2, G Byrne, E Donohue and E Kearns 0-1 each.	Bord na Móna O'Connor Park, Tullamore; Referee: A Kelly (Galway)

1 March 2020; 12:30 pm Round 5	Meath	1-17 - 0-18	Mayo	Páirc Tailteann, Navan; Referee: M Murtagh (Westmeath)
1 March 2020; 12:30 pm Round 5	P O'Hanrahan 0-8 (7f); J Regan 1-2 (1-0 pen); E Ó Donnchadha 0-3; J Kelly, M Burke, A Gannon, D Healy 0-1 each.	Report	S Boland 0-9 (7f); G Kelly, E Delaney 0-2 each; B Hunt, C Freeman, C Phillips, S Mulroy, A Phillips 0-1 each.	Páirc Tailteann, Navan; Referee: M Murtagh (Westmeath)

1 March 2020; 12:30 pm Round 5	Kerry	2-14 - 2-20	Antrim	Austin Stack Park, Tralee; Referee: C McAllister
1 March 2020; 12:30 pm Round 5	P Boyle 0-6 (0-4f), J Conway (1-2), M Boyle (1-1), M Leane (0-2), B Barrett, S Nolan and M Slattery (0-1 each).	Report	N McManus (0-5, 3f, 1, 65), D Nugent (1-2), C McCann (1-0), K Molloy and N McKenna (0-3), J McNaughton (0-2), C Cunning, M Bradley, P Burke, E Campbell and D McCloskey (0-1 each).	Austin Stack Park, Tralee; Referee: C McAllister

=== Division 2A Final ===
18 October 2020; 1:30 pm Final	Antrim	2-23 – 2-20	Kerry	O'Connor Park, Tullamore; Referee: L Gordon (Galway)
18 October 2020; 1:30 pm Final	C Cunning (0-10,7fs), J McNaughton (1-5, 2fs), C McCann (1-1), N McKenna (0-3), P Burke, J Maskey, M Bradley and D Nugent (0-1 each).	Report	S Conway (1-14, 1-9fs, 2x 65s), M Boyle (1-1), M Leane (0-3), M O'Leary and S Nolan (0-1 each).	O'Connor Park, Tullamore; Referee: L Gordon (Galway)

=== Division 2A scoring statistics ===
Top scorers overall

Rank	Player	County	Tally	Total	Matches	Average
1	Neil McManus	Antrim	3-44	53	6	8.83
2	Shane Conway	Kerry	1-49	52	5	10.40
2	Pádraig O'Hanrahan	Meath	1-49	52	5	10.40
3	Eoghan Cahill	Offaly	0-50	50	5	10.00
4	Andy O'Brien	Wicklow	2-41	47	5	9.40
5	Shane Boland	Mayo	0-35	35	5	7.00
6	David Nally	Offaly	3-11	20	5	4.00
7	Jack Conway	Kerry	3-10	19	5	3.80
8	Liam Langton	Offaly	0-18	18	4	4.50
9	James McNaughten	Antrim	2-11	17	6	2.83

Top scorers in a single game

Rank	Player	Club	Tally	Total	Opposition
1	Shane Conway	Kerry	1-14	17	Antrim
1	Eoghan Cahill	Offaly	0-17	17	Wicklow
2	Neil McManus	Antrim	1-13	16	Offaly
2	Pádraig O'Hanrahan	Meath	0-16	16	Wicklow
3	Neil McManus	Antrim	2-09	15	Meath
4	Pádraig O'Hanrahan	Meath	1-11	14	Offaly
5	Andy O'Brien	Wicklow	1-09	12	Meath
5	Andy O'Brien	Wicklow	1-09	12	Offaly
5	Liam Langton	Offaly	0-12	12	Meath
5	Eoghan Cahill	Offaly	0-12	12	Mayo
5	Shane Conway	Kerry	0-12	12	Wicklow
5	Andy O'Brien	Wicklow	0-12	12	Mayo

== Division 2B ==
=== Division 2B Table ===
Division final, winner promoted Relegated

Team	Pld	W	D	L	F	A	Diff	Pts
Derry	5	4	1	0	7-72	4-54	+33	9
Down (P)	5	4	0	1	8-111	4-68	+53	8
Kildare	5	3	1	1	13-80	2-52	+61	7
Roscommon	5	2	0	3	4-65	9-80	-30	4
London	5	1	0	4	2-54	8-69	-34	2
Warwickshire	5	0	0	5	5-26	14-82	-83	0

=== Division 2B Rounds 1 to 5 ===
==== Division 2B Round 1 ====
25 January 2020; 1:00 pm Round 1	Roscommon	2-19 - 1-10	Warwickshire	Dr. Hyde Park, Roscommon; Referee: J Clarke (Cavan)
25 January 2020; 1:00 pm Round 1	MJ Egan 1-7, C Egan 1-1, P Kelly 0-4, G Egan 0-3, E Costello, J Kilkenny, A Moore, S Curley (SC) 0-1 each.	Report	L Hand 1-5 (5f), J Collins 0-3 (1 '65, 1f), W Allen (1f), R Duggan (SC) 0-1 each.	Dr. Hyde Park, Roscommon; Referee: J Clarke (Cavan)

26 January 2020; 12:30 pm Round 1	Kildare	2-26 - 0-20	London	St. Conleth's Park, Newbridge; Referee: S Hynes (Galway)
26 January 2020; 12:30 pm Round 1	B Byrne 1-13 (12f), J Sheridan 1-4 (f), M Delaney 0-3 (2f), J Burke, T Forde, S Christansen, R Kelly, P Divilly, Cathal Dowling 0-1 each.	Report	A Sheehan 0-12 (9f), K Morrissey 0-2, J Goulding, D Corrigan, S Lohan, B Hickey, O Royston, C Nelson 0-1 each.	St. Conleth's Park, Newbridge; Referee: S Hynes (Galway)

26 January 2020; 12:30 pm Round 1	Derry	1-19 - 0-19	Down	Celtic Park, Derry; Referee: C McDonald (Antrim)
26 January 2020; 12:30 pm Round 1	C O'Doherty 0-13 (12fs); R Mullan 1-0; O McKeever 0-2; C Kelly, E Cassidy, P Cleary and T Brady 0-1.	Report	O McManus 0-13 (12fs); R McCusker 0-2; J McManus, C Woods, P McCrickard and T Murray 0-1 each.	Celtic Park, Derry; Referee: C McDonald (Antrim)

==== Division 2B Round 2 ====
1 February 2020; 2:00 pm Round 2	Warwickshire	0-01 - 5-19	Kildare	Páirc na hÉireann, Birmingham; Referee: K Brady (Louth)
1 February 2020; 2:00 pm Round 2	L Hands 0-1.	Report	B Byrne 3-9 (6f, 1 sideline); S Ryan 1-1; J Burke 0-3; D Molloy 1-0; N Ó Muineacháin, J Sheridan 0-2 each; A Kelly, S Whelan 0-1 each.	Páirc na hÉireann, Birmingham; Referee: K Brady (Louth)

2 February 2020; 12:30 pm Round 2	Down	3-23 - 0-11	Roscommon	McKenna Park, Rubane; Referee: T Gleeson

2 February 2020; 2:00 pm Round 2	London	2-19 - 4-15	Derry	McGovern Park, Ruislip; Referee: T Walsh

==== Division 2B Round 3 ====
15 February 2020; 12:30 pm Round 3	Down	3-22 - 2-08	Warwickshire	McKenna Park, Rubane

16 February 2020; 1:00 pm Round 3	Roscommon	0-13 - 0-10	London	Dr. Hyde Park, Roscommon; Referee: K Jordan
16 February 2020; 1:00 pm Round 3	C Dolan (0-10), MJ Egan (0-2), S Curley (0-1).		D Nolan (0-10).	Dr. Hyde Park, Roscommon; Referee: K Jordan

8 March 2020; 2:00 pm Round 3	Derry	2-16 - 3-13	Kildare	Owenbeg

==== Division 2B Round 4 ====
22 February 2020; 1:00 pm Round 4	Derry	4-22 - 2-07	Warwickshire

23 February 2020; 12:30pm Round 4	Kildare	5-21 - 2-12	Roscommon

23 February 2020; 2:00 pm Round 4	London	0-16 - 2-28	Down

==== Division 2B Round 5 ====
1 March 2020; 2:00 pm Round 5	London	w/o - scr.	Warwickshire	McGovern Park, Ruislip

1 March 2020; 2:00 pm Round 5	Down	0-19 - 1-14	Kildare	Fontenoy Park, Castlewellan

1 March 2020; 2:00 pm Round 5	Roscommon	0-10 - 0-16	Derry	Connacht Centre of Excellence, Bekan

=== Division 2B Final ===
18 October 2020; 2 pm Final	Derry	0-17 – 2-16	Down	Athletic Grounds, Armagh; Referee: J Clarke (Cavan)
18 October 2020; 2 pm Final	C O'Doherty (0-11, 10f), E McGill, J Mullan (0-2 each), O McKeever, P Cleary (0-1 each)	Report	E Sands, P Óg McCrickard (1-2 each), O McManus (0-5f), D Sands (0-3), P Savage (0-2), T Prenter, C Woods (1f) (0-1 each)	Athletic Grounds, Armagh; Referee: J Clarke (Cavan)

=== Division 2B relegation play-off ===
8 March 2020; Relegation play-off	London	1-20 - 0-5	Warwickshire	McGovern Park, Ruislip; Referee: Chris Mooney

== Division 3A ==
=== Division 3A Table ===
Division final, winner promoted Automatic relegation to Division 3B

Team	Pld	W	D	L	F	A	Diff	Pts
Armagh	5	3	2	0	9-86	2-77	+30	8
Donegal (P)	5	4	0	1	5-81	5-60	+21	8
Tyrone	5	3	1	1	4-101	8-77	+12	7
Longford	5	2	1	2	4-68	1-79	-2	5
Monaghan	5	1	0	4	6-52	9-83	-40	2
Louth	5	0	0	5	5-64	8-76	-21	0

=== Division 3A Rounds 1 to 5 ===
==== Division 3A Round 1 ====
26 January 2020; 2:00 pm Round 1	Donegal	0-15 - 2-17	Armagh	Letterkenny; Referee: Kevin Brady

26 January 2020; 2:00 pm Round 1	Monaghan	0-18 - 2-16	Longford	Inniskeen; Referee: Tarlach Conway

26 January 2020; 2:00 pm Round 1	Louth	1-16 - 1-21	Tyrone	Darver; Referee: Richie Fitzsimons

==== Division 3A Round 2 ====
2 February 2020; 2:00 pm Round 2	Longford	1-15 - 1-10	Louth	Pearse Park, Longford; Referee: Chris Mooney

2 February 2020; 2:00 pm Round 2	Tyrone	1-15 - 2-23	Donegal	Healy Park; Referee: Tarlach Conway

2 February 2020; 2:00 pm Round 2	Armagh	3-25 - 1-10	Monaghan	Athletic Grounds; Referee: Colm McDonald

==== Division 3A Round 3 ====
16 February 2020; 2:00 pm Round 3	Longford	0-09 - 0-09	Armagh	Pearse Park, Longford

16 February 2020; 2:00 pm Round 3	Monaghan	1-7 - 2-17	Tyrone	Castleblayney

16 February 2020; 2:00 pm Round 3	Louth	1-10 - 2-9	Donegal	Darver

==== Division 3A Round 4 ====
23 February 2020; 2:00 pm Round 4	Donegal	1-15 - 1-05	Monaghan	Letterkenny; Referee: Tarlach Conway

23 February 2020; 2:00 pm Round 4	Tyrone	0-23 - 1-15	Longford	Healy Park; Referee: Colm McDonald

23 February 2020; 2:00 pm Round 4	Armagh	1-19 - 1-18	Louth	Athletic Grounds; Referee: Thomas Gleeson

==== Division 3A Round 5 ====
1 March 2020; 2:00 pm Round 5	Longford	0-13 - 0-19	Donegal	Referee: Richie Fitzsimons

1 March 2020; 2:00 pm Round 5	Monaghan	3-12 - 1-10	Louth	Inniskeen; Referee: Aidan Ferguson

1 March 2020; 2:00 pm Round 5	Armagh	3-16 - 0-25	Tyrone	Athletic Grounds; Referee: James Connors

=== Division 3A Final ===
8 March 2020	Donegal	1-18 – 0-19	Armagh	Páirc Naomh Colmcille, Carrickmore
8 March 2020		Report		Páirc Naomh Colmcille, Carrickmore

== Division 3B ==
=== Division 3B Table ===
Division final, winner promoted

Team	Pld	W	D	L	F	A	Diff	Pts
Sligo (P)	4	4	0	0	12-76	5-54	+43	8
Leitrim	4	2	0	2	4-54	5-45	+6	4
Lancashire	4	2	0	2	3-53	5-45	+2	4
Cavan	4	1	0	3	3-40	4-60	-23	2
Fermanagh	4	1	0	3	2-44	5-63	-28	2

=== Division 3B Rounds 1 to 5 ===
==== Division 3B Round 1 ====
25 January 2020; 2:00pm Round 1	Lancashire	0-15 - 0-08	Cavan	Abbotstown; Referee: Nathan Wall

26 January 2020; 2:00 pm Round 1	Fermanagh	2-12 - 1-13	Leitrim	Brewster Park, Enniskillen; Referee: Thomas Gleeson

==== Division 3B Round 2 ====
1 February 2020; 1:00 pm Round 2	Sligo	3-18 - 1-15	Lancashire	Markievicz Park; Referee: James Clarke

2 February 2020; 2:00 pm Round 2	Cavan	0-17 - 0-12	Fermanagh	Breffni Park; Referee: Mick Murtagh

==== Division 3B Round 3 ====
15 February 2020; 2:00 pm Round 3	Leitrim	0-13 - 0-05	Cavan	Ballinamore

8 March 2020; 2:00 pm Round 3	Fermanagh	0-14 - 3-21	Sligo	Brewster Park, Enniskillen; Referee: Thomas Gleeson

==== Division 3B Round 4 ====
22 February 2020; 3:30 pm Round 4	Lancashire	1-12 - 0-06	Fermanagh	Abbotstown

23 February 2020; 2:00 pm Round 4	Sligo	2-17 - 1-15	Leitrim	Markievicz Park

==== Division 3B Round 5 ====
1 March 2020; 12:30 pm Round 5	Leitrim	2-13 - 1-11	Lancashire	Páirc Seán Mac Diarmada; Referee: Colm McDonald

1 March 2020; 12:30 pm Round 5	Cavan	3-10 - 4-20	Sligo	Breffni Park; Referee: Kevin Jordan

=== Division 3B Final ===
18 October 2020; 1:30 pm Final	Sligo	3-17 – 2-16	Leitrim	Connacht Centre of Excellence, Bekan
